= List of UK top-ten singles in 2003 =

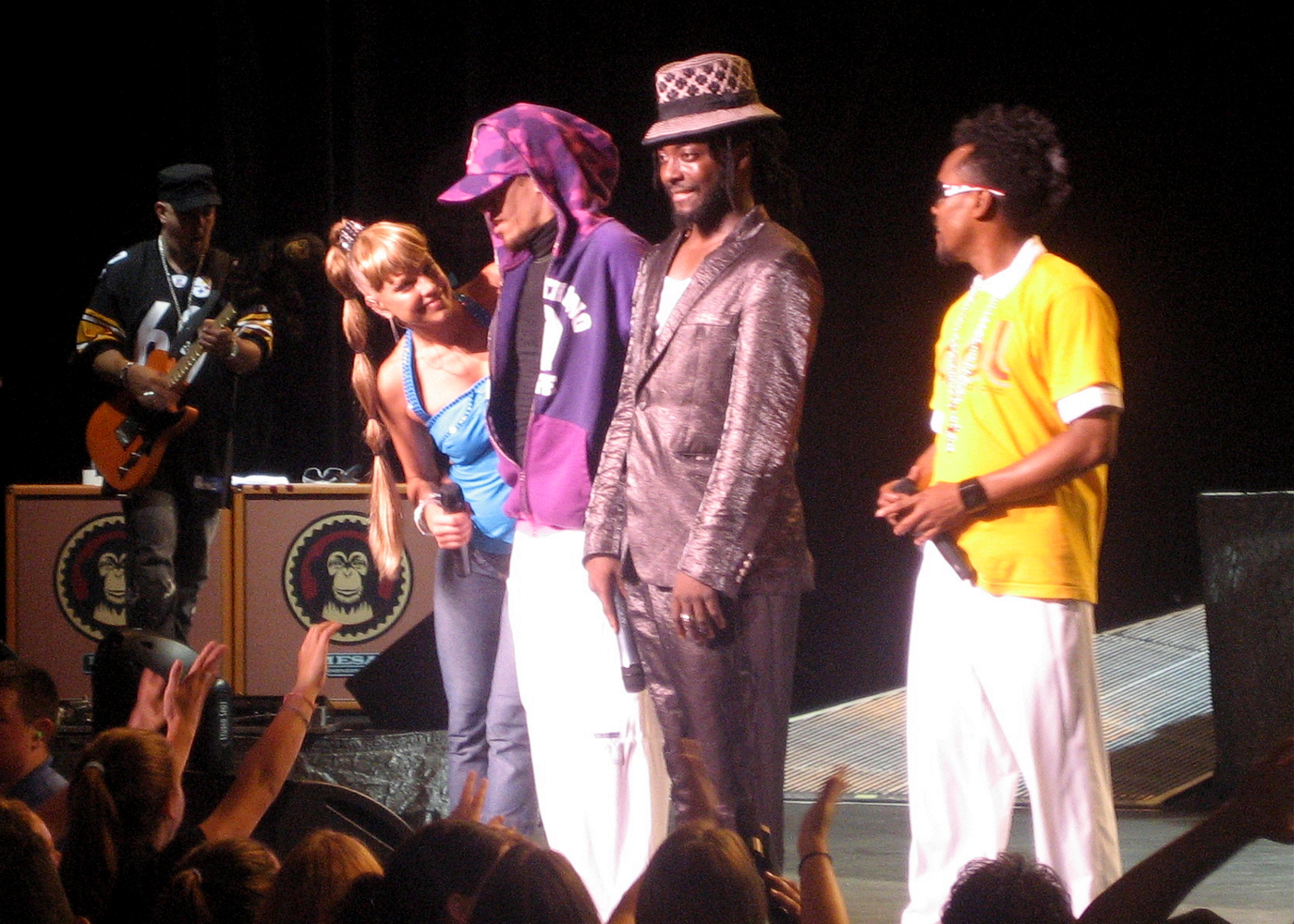
Black Eyed Peas had the biggest selling single of 2003, "Where is the Love", which spent six weeks at number-one. The group scored a second top 10 hit later in the year with "Shut Up", which debuted at number two in December.

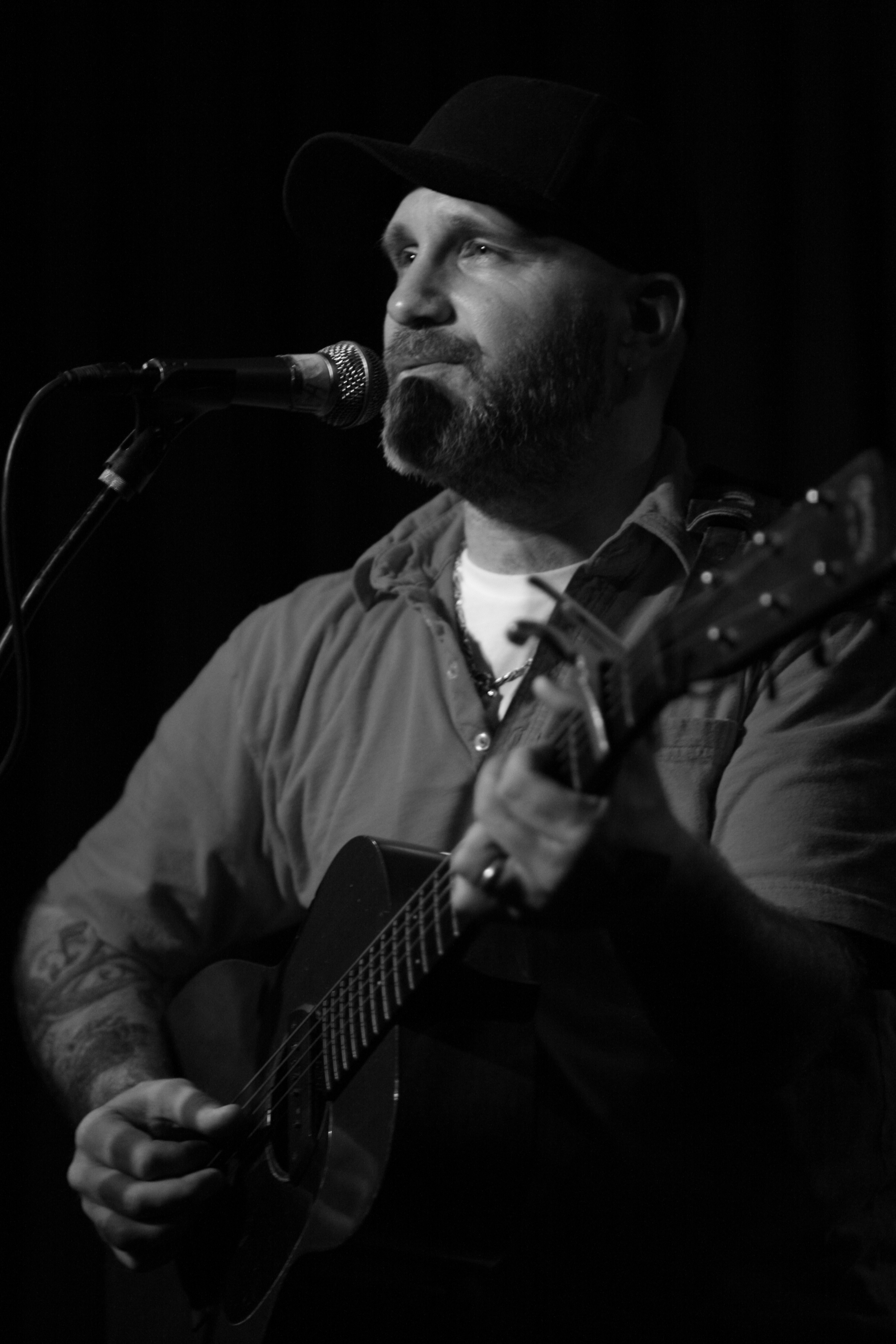
Gary Jules (pictured) and his friend Michael Andrews recorded a cover version of Tears for Fears' "Mad World" for the soundtrack of the 2001 film Donnie Darko. Released as a single in the UK in December of this year, it became the year's fourth best selling single, as well as the year's Christmas number-one. Jules and Andrews are both listed as one-hit wonders, as neither made the UK charts again.

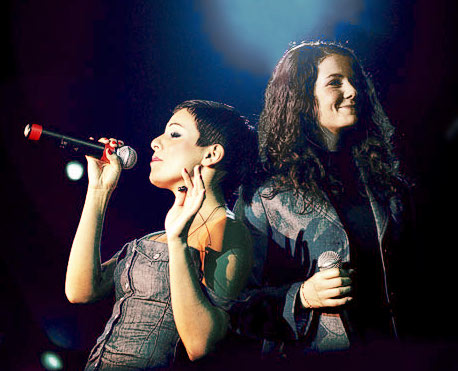
t.A.T.u. had two UK top 10 singles in 2003, including "All the Things She Said", which was the first song by a Russian act to top the UK charts. Spending four weeks at number-one, it went on to become the year's sixth best selling single.

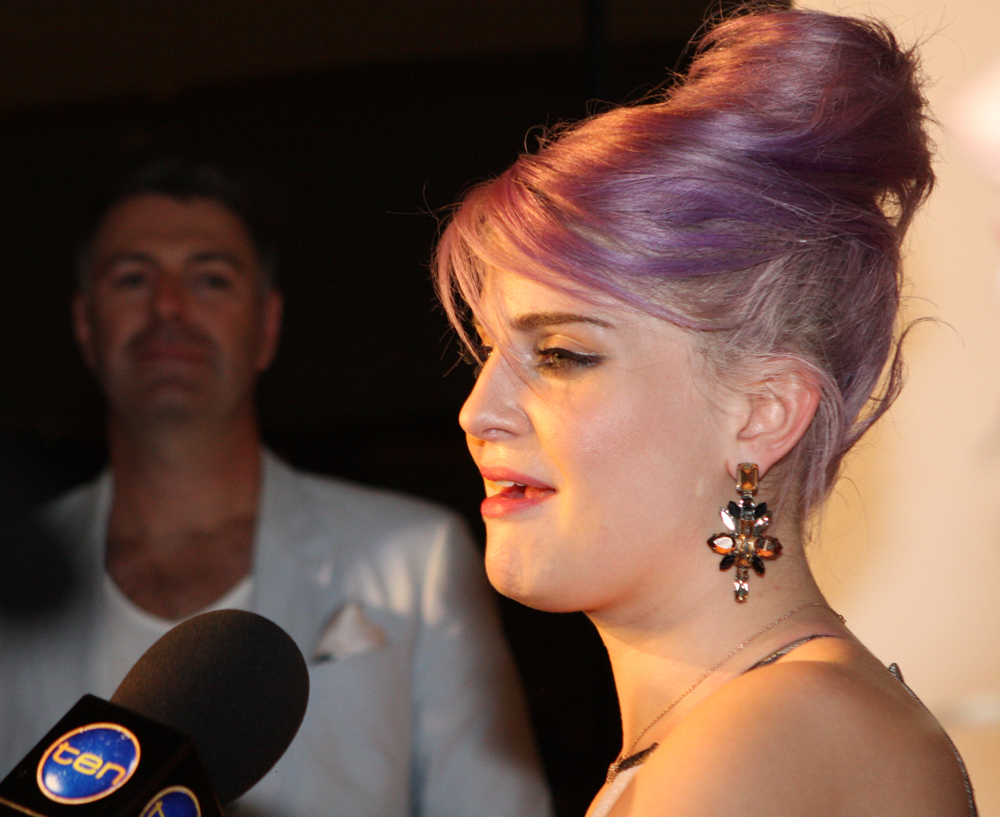
Kelly Osbourne and her father Ozzy recorded a duet version of Black Sabbath's 1972 song "Changes" and released it as a single in December of this year. It entered the UK charts at number-one, became the seventh best-selling song of the year, and remains the only UK number-one single for either artist.

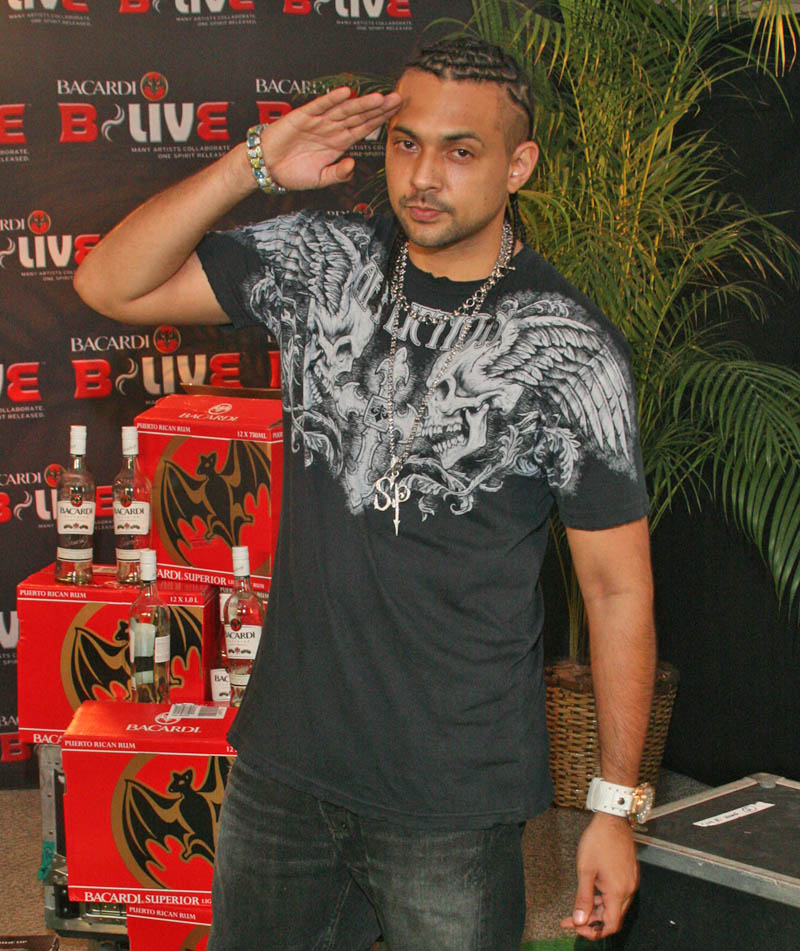
Jamaican singer and rapper Sean Paul had the most top ten entries in 2003 with five in total. The most successful of these was his collaboration with Blu Cantrell, "Breathe", which spent four weeks at number-one and became the eighth best selling single of the year.

The UK Singles Chart is one of many music charts compiled by the Official Charts Company that calculates the best-selling singles of the week in the United Kingdom. Before 2004, the chart was only based on the sales of physical singles. This list shows singles that peaked in the top ten of the UK Singles Chart during 2003, as well as singles which peaked in 2002 and 2004 but were in the top ten in 2003. The entry date is when the song appeared in the top ten for the first time (week ending, as published by the Official Charts Company, which is six days after the chart is announced).

Two hundred and twenty-nine singles were in the top ten in 2003, the highest unique number of top 10 singles in a calendar year of all time. Eleven singles from 2002 remained in the top ten for several weeks at the beginning of the year, while "Hey Ya!" by Outkast was released in 2003 but did not reach its peak until 2004. "Sk8er Boi" by Avril Lavigne" was the only song from 2002 to reach its peak in 2003. Sixty artists scored multiple entries in the top ten in 2003. 50 Cent, The Darkness, Good Charlotte, Sean Paul and The White Stripes were among the many artists who achieved their first UK charting top-ten single in 2003.

The 2002 Christmas number-one, "Sound of the Underground" by Girls Aloud (which was the group's winners single after being formed on Popstars: The Rivals), remained at number-one for the first three weeks of 2003. The first new number-one single of the year was "Stop Living the Lie" by Fame Academy winner David Sneddon. Overall, twenty-two different singles peaked at number-one in 2003, with Busted (2) having the most singles hit that position.

== Background ==
=== Multiple entries ===
Two-hundred and twenty-nine singles charted in 2003, with two-hundred and eighteen singles reaching their peak this year.

Sixty artists scored multiple entries in the top ten in 2003. Jamaican singer Sean Paul achieved five top five entries in the United Kingdom, the most of any act that year, including the number-one single "Breathe", which he recorded with Blu Cantrell. His second highest charting song was "Baby Boy", a duet with Destiny's Child member Beyoncé as she launched her solo career, peaking at number two. Of his other hit singles, "Like Glue" charted highest at number three,"Get Busy" reached a high of number four and "Gimme the Light" landed one place lower but made the top five.

Six artists had the joint second most top ten singles in 2003 with four each. Busted, Girls Aloud, Christina Aguilera, Robbie Williams, The Cheeky Girls and Justin Timberlake all had four top-ten singles in 2003. Busted claimed the number-one spot on two occasions with "You Said No" and "Crashed the Wedding". A third single, "Year 3000" placed at number two and they achieved a fourth hit single for the year with "Sleeping with the Light On", reaching a high of number three. Girls Aloud took debut single "Sound of the Underground" - recorded as their winning single for the television competition show Popstars the Rivals - to number one at the end of the previous year, beating rival act One True Voice to Christmas number one. While One True Voice disbanded after one more single, Girls Aloud scored three more top tens in 2003 - both a cover of "Jump" for the Love Actually soundtrack and "No Good Advice" placed at number two, and "Life Got Cold" made number three.

Fellow Popstars contestants The Cheeky Girls followed up December 2002's launch single "The Cheeky Song (Touch My Bum)" (a number two hit) with three more top ten singles. "Take Your Shoes Off" went straight in at number three, as did "Hooray Hooray (It's a Cheeky Holiday)". A Christmas single, "Have a Cheeky Christmas" scraped into the top ten at the end of the year. Christina Aguilera had one of the biggest hits of her career with "Beautiful", which topped the chart in March 2003. "Fighter" was a number three entry, "Can't Hold Us Down", with the added vocals of Lil' Kim placed at number 6 and "The Voice Within" rounded off her year, peaking at number nine.

Justin Timberlake, who had previously been part of 'N Sync, had four top ten hits in his own right, including one featured appearance on The Black Eyed Peas single "Where Is the Love?". The song spent six weeks at number-one and was the best-selling single of 2003. His other chart hits were number-two peaking "Cry Me a River" and "Rock Your Body", and "Work It" with Nelly which made number seven.

Former Take That singer Robbie Williams was the final artist with four top-ten singles to his name in 2003. "Feel" officially charted at the end of 2002 but remained in the chart for the first couple of weeks of the year. "Something Beautiful" reached number three in August, "Come Undone" ranked one place lower and "Sexed Up" placed at number ten.

Rock band Evanescence was one of a number of artists with three top-ten entries, including the number one single "Bring Me to Life".50 Cent, Big Brovaz, Delta Goodrem, Good Charlotte and Westlife were among the other artists who had multiple top-ten entries in 2003.

=== Chart debuts ===
Eighty-five artists achieved their first top-ten single in 2003, either as a lead or featured artist. Of these, thirteen went on to record another hit single that year: Appleton, Amy Studt, Black Eyed Peas, The Coral, The Darkness, David Sneddon, Electric Six, Fast Food Rockers, Jaimeson, Lemar, Richard X, t.A.T.u and Triple 8. Five artists achieved two more chart hits in 2003: 50 Cent, Delta Goodrem, D-Side, Evanescence and Good Charlotte. Sean Paul had four other entries in his breakthrough year.

The following table (collapsed on desktop site) does not include acts who had previously charted as part of a group and secured their first top-ten solo single.

| Artist | Number of top tens | First entry | Chart position | Other entries |
|---|---|---|---|---|
| Electric Six | 2 | "Danger! High Voltage" | 2 | "Gay Bar" (5) |
| Divine Inspiration | 1 | "The Way (Put Your Hand in My Hand)" | 5 | — |
| David Sneddon | 2 | "Stop Living the Lie" | 1 | "Don't Let Go" (3) |
| Jaimeson | 2 | "True" | 4 | "Complete" (4) |
| Angel Blu | 1 | "True" | 4 | — |
| Panjabi MC | 1 | "Mundian To Bach Ke" | 5 | — |
| Layo & Bushwacka! | 1 | "Love Story (vs. Finally)" | 8 | — |
| Jurgen Vries | 1 | "The Opera Song (Brave New World)" | 3 | — |
| CMC | 1 | "The Opera Song (Brave New World)" | 3 | — |
| t.A.T.u. | 2 | "All the Things She Said" | 1 | "Not Gonna Get Us" (7) |
| Cam'ron | 1 | "Hey Ma" | 8 | — |
| Juelz Santana | 1 | "Hey Ma" | 8 | — |
| Sean Paul | 5 | "Gimme the Light" | 5 | "Get Busy" (4), "Like Glue" (3), "Breathe" (1) "Baby Boy" (2) |
| Sinéad Quinn | 1 | "I Can't Break Down" | 2 | — |
| Appleton | 2 | "Don't Worry" | 5 | "Fantasy" (2) |
| Turin Brakes | 1 | "Pain Killer" | 5 | — |
| Good Charlotte | 3 | "Lifestyles of the Rich and Famous" | 8 | "The Anthem" (10), "Girls & Boys" (6) |
| Kira | 1 | "I'll Be Your Angel" | 8 | — |
| Loona | 1 | "The Boys of Summer" | 2 | — |
| Junior Senior | 1 | "Move Your Feet" | 3 | — |
| Ainslie Henderson | 1 | "Keep Me a Secret" | 5 | — |
| The Coral | 2 | "Don't Think You're the First" | 10 | "Pass It On" (5) |
| The Kumars | 1 | "Spirit in the Sky" | 1 | — |
| Delta Goodrem | 3 | "Born to Try" | 3 | "Innocent Eyes" (9), "Lost Without You" (4) |
| 50 Cent | 3 | "In da Club" | 1 | "21 Questions" (1), "P.I.M.P." (3) |
| Richard X | 2 | "Being Nobody" | 3 | "Finest Dreams" (8) |
| Room 5 | 1 | "Make Luv" | 1 | — |
| Oliver Cheatham | 1 | "Make Luv" | 1 | — |
| D-Side | 3 | "Speechless" | 9 | "Invisible" (7), "Real World" (9) |
| DMX | 1 | "X Gon' Give It to Ya" | 6 | — |
| The White Stripes | 1 | "Seven Nation Army" | 7 | — |
| Triple 8 | 2 | "Knockout" | 8 | "Give Me a Reason" (9) |
| Tomcraft | 1 | "Loneliness" | 1 | — |
| Bhangra Knights | 1 | "Husan" | 7 | — |
| Husan | 1 | "Husan" | 7 | — |
| XTM | 1 | "Fly on the Wings of Love" | 8 | — |
| DJ Chucky | 1 | "Fly on the Wings of Love" | 8 | — |
| Annia | 1 | "Fly on the Wings of Love" | 8 | — |
| Evanescence | 3 | "Bring Me to Life" | 1 | "Going Under" (8), "My Immortal" (7) |
| Amy Studt | 2 | "Misfit" | 6 | "Under the Thumb" (10) |
| B2K | 1 | "Girlfriend" | 10 | — |
| Fast Food Rockers | 2 | "Fast Food Song" | 2 | "Say Cheese (Smile Please)" (10) |
| Wayne Wonder | 1 | "No Letting Go" | 3 | — |
| Jennifer Ellison | 1 | "Baby I Don't Care" | 6 | — |
| Javine | 1 | "Real Things" | 4 | — |
| Benny Benassi presents The Biz | 1 | "Satisfaction" | 2 | — |
| The Biz | 1 | "Satisfaction" | 2 | — |
| Deepest Blue | 1 | "Deepest Blue" | 7 | — |
| Blu Cantrell | 1 | "Breathe" | 1 | — |
| Lumidee | 1 | "Never Leave You (Uh Oooh, Uh Oooh)" | 2 | — |
| Ultrabeat | 1 | "Pretty Green Eyes" | 2 | — |
| Holly James | 1 | "I'm in Heaven" | 9 | — |
| Big Tigger | 1 | "Snake" | 10 | — |
| Lemar | 2 | "Dance (With U)" | 2 | "50/50 & Lullaby" (5) |
| Stacie Orrico | 1 | "Stuck" | 9 | — |
| Nodesha | 1 | "Miss Perfect" | 5 | — |
| Kelly Clarkson | 1 | "Miss Independent" | 6 | — |
| Speedway | 1 | "Genie in a Bottle"/"Save Yourself" | 10 | — |
| Black Eyed Peas | 2 | "Where Is the Love?" | 1 | "Shut Up" (2) |
| Muse | 1 | "Time Is Running Out" | 8 | — |
| Murphy Lee | 1 | "Shake Ya Tailfeather" | 10 | — |
| The Darkness | 2 | "I Believe in a Thing Called Love" | 2 | "Christmas Time (Don't Let the Bells End)" (2) |
| The Strokes | 1 | "12:51" | 7 | — |
| Kardinal Offishall | 1 | "Carnival Girl" | 9 | — |
| Kevin Lyttle | 1 | "Turn Me On" | 2 | — |
| Fatman Scoop | 1 | "Be Faithful" | 1 | — |
| Obie Trice | 1 | "Got Some Teeth" | 8 | — |
| Hilary Duff | 1 | "So Yesterday" | 9 | — |
| Phixx | 1 | "Hold on Me" | 10 | — |
| Alex Parks | 1 | "Maybe That's What It Takes" | 3 | — |
| Shane Richie | 1 | "I'm Your Man" | 2 | — |
| Katie Melua | 1 | "The Closest Thing to Crazy" | 10 | — |
| Michael Andrews | 1 | "Mad World" | 1 | — |
| Gary Jules | 1 | "Mad World" | 1 | — |
| Bo' Selecta! | 1 | "Proper Crimbo" | 4 | — |
| The Idols | 1 | "Happy Xmas (War Is Over)" | 5 | — |
| Andy Scott-Lee | 1 | "Happy Xmas (War Is Over)" | 5 | — |
| Brian Ormond | 1 | "Happy Xmas (War Is Over)" | 5 | — |
| Chris Hide | 1 | "Happy Xmas (War Is Over)" | 5 | — |
| Kim Gee | 1 | "Happy Xmas (War Is Over)" | 5 | — |
| Marc Dillon | 1 | "Happy Xmas (War Is Over)" | 5 | — |
| Mark Rhodes | 1 | "Happy Xmas (War Is Over)" | 5 | — |
| Michelle | 1 | "Happy Xmas (War Is Over)" | 5 | — |
| Roxanne Cooper | 1 | "Happy Xmas (War Is Over)" | 5 | — |
| Sam Nixon | 1 | "Happy Xmas (War Is Over)" | 5 | — |
| Susanne Manning | 1 | "Happy Xmas (War Is Over)" | 5 | — |

Notes

Richard X was a producer on Freak Like Me by Sugababes in 2002 but "Being Nobody" was his first official credit. Kym Marsh was part of the group Hear'Say, who had two number-one singles in 2001. "Cry" and "Come On Over" were her debut chart entries as a solo artist.

Lisa Scott-Lee launched her solo career with "Lately" in 2003. She was previously a member of the group Steps. Rachel Stevens achieved her first top ten hit outside S Club with "Sweet Dreams My LA Ex", which reached number two.

The comedy Christmas song "Proper Crimbo" was credited to Bo Selecta! but had various other artists on the recording and in the video. Among these were chart debutants including Dermot O'Leary, Edith Bowman, Jimmy Carr, Matthew Wright and Richard Bacon as well as musicians who already had a top-ten hit to their name. Melanie Blatt was in All Saints in the 1990s and made number six in 2001 as a solo artist with her feature on Artful Dodger's song "TwentyFourSeven". Melanie Brown had been a member of the internationally successful Spice Girls, while MC Harvey was part of So Solid Crew and Kerry Katona had been a founding member of Atomic Kitten. The broadcaster Jimmy Young had a series of chart hits in the 1950s, including number-ones "Unchained Melody" and "The Man from Laramie". David Gray's most widely known song to date was "Babylon", a number 5 entry in June 2000. Bob Geldof found fame as a member of The Boomtown Rats. Fame Academy winner David Sneddon had reached the top of the charts earlier in the year with debut single "Stop Living the Lie", and Australian soap actress and singer Holly Valance made her breakthrough in 2002 with "Kiss Kiss".

The Idols was made up of the final 10 from Pop Idol series 2. Michelle would have a number-one single with "All This Time" in January 2004, and Sam Nixon and Mark Rhodes formed the duo Sam and Mark.

=== Songs from films ===
Original songs from various films entered the top ten throughout the year. These included "03 Bonnie & Clyde" (from Hey Arnold!: The Movie), "Love Ain't Gonna Wait for You" (Seeing Double), "Feel Good Time" (Charlie's Angels: Full Throttle), "Maybe Tomorrow" (Wicker Park), "Stuck" (Stuck in the Suburbs), "Shake Ya Tailfeather" (Bad Boys II), "Jump" and "Too Lost in You" (Love Actually) and "Mad World" (Donnie Darko).

=== Charity singles ===
A number of singles recorded for charity reached the top ten in the charts in 2003. The Comic Relief single was a cover version of Norman Greenbaum's "Spirit in the Sky" by Gareth Gates and The Kumars, peaking at number one on 22 March 2003.

Shane Richie recorded the Children in Need single for 2003, a cover of Wham!'s "I'm Your Man". It peaked at number two on 6 December 2003.

=== Best-selling singles ===
Black Eyed Peas had the best-selling single of the year with "Where Is The Love?". The song spent eleven weeks in the top ten (including six weeks at number one), sold over 625,000 copies and was certified platinum by the BPI. "Spirit in the Sky" by Gareth Gates and The Kumars came in second place, selling more than 552,000 copies and losing out by around 70,000 sales. R. Kelly's "Ignition (Remix)", "Mad World" from Michael Andrews featuring Gary Jules and "Leave Right Now" by Will Young made up the top five. Singles by t.A.T.u., Ozzy & Kelly Osbourne, Blu Cantrell featuring Sean Paul, Room 5 featuring Oliver Cheatham and The Darkness were also in the top ten best-selling singles of the year.

== Top-ten singles ==
| Symbol | Meaning |
|---|---|
| ‡ | Single peaked in 2002 but still in chart in 2003. |
| ♦ | Single released in 2003 but peaked in 2004. |
| (#) | Year-end top-ten single position and rank |
| Entered | The date that the single first appeared in the chart. |
| Peak | Highest position that the single reached in the UK Singles Chart. |

| Entered (week ending) | Weeks in top 10 | Single | Artist | Peak | Peak reached (week ending) | Weeks at peak |
Singles in 2002
| 19 October 2002 | 13 | "The Ketchup Song (Aserejé)" ‡ | Las Ketchup | 1 | 19 October 2002 | 1 |
| 26 October 2002 | 9 | "Dilemma" ‡^{[A]} | Nelly featuring Kelly Rowland | 1 | 26 October 2002 | 2 |
| 7 December 2002 | 10 | "If You're Not the One" ‡ | Daniel Bedingfield | 1 | 7 December 2002 | 1 |
| 14 December 2002 | 13 | "Lose Yourself" ‡ | Eminem | 1 | 14 December 2002 | 1 |
| 14 December 2002 | 6 | "Cheeky Song (Touch My Bum)" ‡ | The Cheeky Girls | 2 | 14 December 2002 | 4 |
| 14 December 2002 | 4 | "Feel" ‡ | Robbie Williams | 4 | 14 December 2002 | 1 |
| 21 December 2002 | 5 | "Sorry Seems to Be the Hardest Word" ‡ | Blue featuring Elton John | 1 | 21 December 2002 | 1 |
| 28 December 2002 | 7 | "Sound of the Underground" ‡ | Girls Aloud | 1 | 28 December 2002 | 4 |
| 28 December 2002 | 4 | "Sacred Trust"/"After You're Gone" ‡ | One True Voice | 2 | 28 December 2002 | 1 |
| 28 December 2002 | 4 | "You're a Superstar" ‡ | Love Inc. | 7 | 28 December 2002 | 4 |
| 28 December 2002 | 3 | "Sk8er Boi" | Avril Lavigne | 8 | 11 January 2003 | 1 |
Singles in 2003
| 18 January 2003 | 2 | "Danger! High Voltage" | Electric Six | 2 | 18 January 2003 | 1 |
| 18 January 2003 | 1 | "The Way (Put Your Hand in My Hand)" | Divine Inspiration | 5 | 18 January 2003 | 1 |
| 18 January 2003 | 1 | "Solsbury Hill" | Erasure | 10 | 18 January 2003 | 1 |
| 25 January 2003 | 5 | "Stop Living the Lie" | David Sneddon | 1 | 25 January 2003 | 2 |
| 25 January 2003 | 5 | "Year 3000" | Busted | 2 | 25 January 2003 | 1 |
| 25 January 2003 | 2 | "True" | Jaimeson featuring Angel Blu | 4 | 25 January 2003 | 1 |
| 25 January 2003 | 3 | "Mundian To Bach Ke" | Panjabi MC | 5 | 25 January 2003 | 1 |
| 25 January 2003 | 1 | "Love Story (vs. Finally)" | Layo & Bushwacka! | 8 | 25 January 2003 | 1 |
| 25 January 2003 | 1 | "Just the Way I'm Feeling" | Feeder | 10 | 25 January 2003 | 1 |
| 1 February 2003 | 3 | "'03 Bonnie & Clyde" | Jay-Z featuring Beyoncé Knowles | 2 | 1 February 2003 | 1 |
| 1 February 2003 | 2 | "The Opera Song (Brave New World)" | Jurgen Vries featuring CMC | 3 | 1 February 2003 | 1 |
| 1 February 2003 | 1 | "Hidden Agenda" | Craig David | 10 | 1 February 2003 | 1 |
| 8 February 2003 | 6 | "All the Things She Said" (#6) | t.A.T.u. | 1 | 8 February 2003 | 4 |
| 8 February 2003 | 5 | "Stole" | Kelly Rowland | 2 | 8 February 2003 | 1 |
| 8 February 2003 | 1 | "Hey Ma" | Cam'ron featuring Juelz Santana, Freekey Zekey & Toya | 8 | 8 February 2003 | 1 |
| 15 February 2003 | 5 | "Cry Me a River" | Justin Timberlake | 2 | 15 February 2003 | 2 |
| 15 February 2003 | 2 | "Songbird" | Oasis | 3 | 15 February 2003 | 1 |
| 15 February 2003 | 1 | "Gimme the Light" | Sean Paul | 5 | 15 February 2003 | 1 |
| 15 February 2003 | 1 | "OK" | Big Brovaz | 7 | 15 February 2003 | 1 |
| 22 February 2003 | 3 | "I Can't Break Down" | Sinéad Quinn | 2 | 22 February 2003 | 1 |
| 22 February 2003 | 1 | "Don't Worry" | Appleton | 5 | 22 February 2003 | 1 |
| 22 February 2003 | 1 | "Reminisce"/"Where the Story Ends" | Blazin' Squad | 8 | 22 February 2003 | 1 |
| 1 March 2003 | 1 | "Pain Killer" | Turin Brakes | 5 | 1 March 2003 | 1 |
| 1 March 2003 | 1 | "Lifestyles of the Rich and Famous" | Good Charlotte | 8 | 1 March 2003 | 1 |
| 1 March 2003 | 1 | "I'll Be Your Angel" | Kira | 9 | 1 March 2003 | 1 |
| 1 March 2003 | 1 | "Familiar Feeling" | Moloko | 10 | 1 March 2003 | 1 |
| 8 March 2003 | 3 | "Beautiful" | Christina Aguilera | 1 | 8 March 2003 | 2 |
| 8 March 2003 | 3 | "The Boys of Summer" | DJ Sammy featuring Loona | 2 | 8 March 2003 | 1 |
| 8 March 2003 | 9 | "Move Your Feet" | Junior Senior | 3 | 15 March 2003 | 2 |
| 8 March 2003 | 1 | "Keep Me a Secret" | Ainslie Henderson | 5 | 8 March 2003 | 1 |
| 8 March 2003 | 1 | "Here It Comes Again" | Melanie C | 7 | 8 March 2003 | 1 |
| 15 March 2003 | 2 | "I Begin to Wonder" | Dannii Minogue | 2 | 15 March 2003 | 1 |
| 15 March 2003 | 1 | "Sing for the Moment" | Eminem | 6 | 15 March 2003 | 1 |
| 15 March 2003 | 1 | "Work It" | Nelly featuring Justin Timberlake | 7 | 15 March 2003 | 1 |
| 15 March 2003 | 1 | "Incredible (What I Meant to Say)" | Darius | 9 | 15 March 2003 | 1 |
| 15 March 2003 | 1 | "Don't Think You're the First" | The Coral | 10 | 15 March 2003 | 1 |
| 22 March 2003 | 6 | "Spirit in the Sky" (#2) ^{[B]} | Gareth Gates with The Kumars | 1 | 22 March 2003 | 2 |
| 22 March 2003 | 6 | "All I Have" | Jennifer Lopez featuring LL Cool J | 2 | 22 March 2003 | 1 |
| 22 March 2003 | 4 | "Born to Try" ^{[C]} | Delta Goodrem | 3 | 22 March 2003 | 1 |
| 22 March 2003 | 9 | "In da Club" | 50 Cent | 3 | 19 April 2003 | 2 |
| 22 March 2003 | 1 | "Ka-Ching!" | Shania Twain | 8 | 22 March 2003 | 1 |
| 22 March 2003 | 1 | "Gossip Folks" | Missy Elliott featuring Ludacris | 9 | 22 March 2003 | 1 |
| 29 March 2003 | 4 | "Scandalous" | Mis-Teeq | 2 | 29 March 2003 | 1 |
| 29 March 2003 | 2 | "Being Nobody" | Richard X vs. Liberty X | 3 | 29 March 2003 | 1 |
| 29 March 2003 | 1 | "U Make Me Wanna" | Blue | 4 | 29 March 2003 | 1 |
| 29 March 2003 | 2 | "Sunrise" | Simply Red | 7 | 29 March 2003 | 1 |
| 29 March 2003 | 1 | "Somewhere I Belong" | Linkin Park | 10 | 29 March 2003 | 1 |
| 5 April 2003 | 6 | "Make Luv" (#9) | Room 5 featuring Oliver Cheatham | 1 | 5 April 2003 | 4 |
| 5 April 2003 | 2 | "Tonight"/"Miss You Nights" | Westlife | 3 | 5 April 2003 | 1 |
| 5 April 2003 | 1 | "Clocks" | Coldplay | 9 | 5 April 2003 | 1 |
| 12 April 2003 | 1 | "Love Doesn't Have to Hurt" | Atomic Kitten | 4 | 12 April 2003 | 1 |
| 12 April 2003 | 2 | "I'm with You" | Avril Lavigne | 7 | 12 April 2003 | 1 |
| 19 April 2003 | 3 | "Cry" | Kym Marsh | 2 | 19 April 2003 | 1 |
| 19 April 2003 | 1 | "I Can't Read You" | Daniel Bedingfield | 6 | 19 April 2003 | 1 |
| 26 April 2003 | 1 | "American Life" | Madonna | 2 | 26 April 2003 | 1 |
| 26 April 2003 | 1 | "Come Undone" | Robbie Williams | 4 | 26 April 2003 | 1 |
| 26 April 2003 | 1 | "Out of Time" | Blur | 5 | 26 April 2003 | 1 |
| 26 April 2003 | 1 | "Speechless" | D-Side | 9 | 26 April 2003 | 1 |
| 3 May 2003 | 3 | "You Said No" | Busted | 1 | 3 May 2003 | 1 |
| 3 May 2003 | 3 | "All Over" | Lisa Maffia | 2 | 3 May 2003 | 1 |
| 3 May 2003 | 2 | "Don't Let Go" | David Sneddon | 3 | 3 May 2003 | 1 |
| 3 May 2003 | 2 | "X Gon' Give It to Ya" | DMX | 6 | 3 May 2003 | 1 |
| 3 May 2003 | 1 | "Seven Nation Army" | The White Stripes | 7 | 3 May 2003 | 1 |
| 3 May 2003 | 1 | "Knockout" | Triple 8 | 8 | 3 May 2003 | 1 |
| 10 May 2003 | 4 | "Loneliness" | Tomcraft | 1 | 10 May 2003 | 1 |
| 10 May 2003 | 4 | "Rise & Fall" | Craig David featuring Sting | 2 | 10 May 2003 | 1 |
| 10 May 2003 | 1 | "The Long Goodbye" | Ronan Keating | 3 | 10 May 2003 | 1 |
| 10 May 2003 | 1 | "Can't Nobody" | Kelly Rowland | 5 | 10 May 2003 | 1 |
| 17 May 2003 | 10 | "Ignition (Remix)" (#3) | R. Kelly | 1 | 17 May 2003 | 4 |
| 17 May 2003 | 4 | "Favourite Things" | Big Brovaz | 2 | 17 May 2003 | 1 |
| 17 May 2003 | 2 | "Take Your Shoes Off" | The Cheeky Girls | 3 | 17 May 2003 | 1 |
| 17 May 2003 | 1 | "Girls & Boys" | Good Charlotte | 6 | 17 May 2003 | 1 |
| 17 May 2003 | 2 | "Husan" ^{[D]} | Bhangra Knights vs. Husan | 7 | 17 May 2003 | 1 |
| 24 May 2003 | 2 | "No Good Advice" | Girls Aloud | 2 | 24 May 2003 | 1 |
| 24 May 2003 | 5 | "Get Busy" | Sean Paul | 4 | 24 May 2003 | 1 |
| 24 May 2003 | 1 | "Lately" | Lisa Scott-Lee | 6 | 24 May 2003 | 1 |
| 24 May 2003 | 1 | "All About Lovin' You" | Bon Jovi | 9 | 24 May 2003 | 1 |
| 31 May 2003 | 3 | "Rock Your Body" | Justin Timberlake | 2 | 31 May 2003 | 1 |
| 31 May 2003 | 1 | "Madame Helga" | Stereophonics | 4 | 31 May 2003 | 1 |
| 31 May 2003 | 1 | "Not Gonna Get Us" | t.A.T.u. | 7 | 31 May 2003 | 1 |
| 31 May 2003 | 1 | "Broken Bones" | Love Inc. | 8 | 31 May 2003 | 1 |
| 7 June 2003 | 3 | "Say Goodbye/"Love Ain't Gonna Wait for You" | S Club | 2 | 7 June 2003 | 1 |
| 7 June 2003 | 5 | "I Know What You Want" | Busta Rhymes & Mariah Carey featuring the Flipmode Squad | 3 | 7 June 2003 | 2 |
| 7 June 2003 | 1 | "There There" | Radiohead | 4 | 7 June 2003 | 1 |
| 7 June 2003 | 1 | "Free Me" | Emma Bunton | 5 | 7 June 2003 | 1 |
| 7 June 2003 | 8 | "Fly on the Wings of Love" ^{[E]} | XTM & DJ Chucky featuring Annia | 8 | 14 June 2003 | 3 |
| 7 June 2003 | 1 | "Stop Sign" | Abs | 10 | 7 June 2003 | 1 |
| 14 June 2003 | 9 | "Bring Me to Life" | Evanescence | 1 | 14 June 2003 | 4 |
| 14 June 2003 | 1 | "Gay Bar" | Electric Six | 5 | 14 June 2003 | 1 |
| 14 June 2003 | 1 | "Forever and for Always" | Shania Twain | 6 | 14 June 2003 | 1 |
| 14 June 2003 | 1 | "Shakespeare's (Way with) Words" | One True Voice | 10 | 14 June 2003 | 1 |
| 21 June 2003 | 2 | "Fighter" | Christina Aguilera | 3 | 21 June 2003 | 1 |
| 21 June 2003 | 1 | "Don't Wanna Lose This Feeling" | Dannii Minogue | 5 | 21 June 2003 | 1 |
| 21 June 2003 | 1 | "Misfit" | Amy Studt | 6 | 21 June 2003 | 1 |
| 21 June 2003 | 1 | "Sunlight" | DJ Sammy | 8 | 21 June 2003 | 1 |
| 21 June 2003 | 1 | "Girlfriend" | B2K | 10 | 21 June 2003 | 1 |
| 28 June 2003 | 5 | "Fast Food Song" | Fast Food Rockers | 2 | 28 June 2003 | 2 |
| 28 June 2003 | 3 | "Lost Without You" | Delta Goodrem | 4 | 28 June 2003 | 1 |
| 28 June 2003 | 6 | "No Letting Go" | Wayne Wonder | 3 | 26 July 2003 | 1 |
| 28 June 2003 | 1 | "Baby I Don't Care" | Jennifer Ellison | 6 | 28 June 2003 | 1 |
| 28 June 2003 | 2 | "Rock wit U (Awww Baby)" | Ashanti | 7 | 28 June 2003 | 1 |
| 5 July 2003 | 1 | "We Just Be Dreamin'" | Blazin' Squad | 3 | 5 July 2003 | 1 |
| 5 July 2003 | 1 | "St. Anger" | Metallica | 9 | 5 July 2003 | 1 |
| 12 July 2003 | 6 | "Crazy in Love" | Beyoncé | 1 | 12 July 2003 | 3 |
| 12 July 2003 | 1 | "Fool No More" | S Club 8 | 4 | 12 July 2003 | 1 |
| 12 July 2003 | 1 | "21 Questions" | 50 Cent featuring Nate Dogg | 6 | 12 July 2003 | 1 |
| 12 July 2003 | 1 | "Can't Get It Back" | Mis-Teeq | 8 | 12 July 2003 | 1 |
| 19 July 2003 | 1 | "Hollywood" | Madonna | 2 | 19 July 2003 | 1 |
| 19 July 2003 | 3 | "Feel Good Time" | Pink featuring William Orbit | 3 | 19 July 2003 | 1 |
| 19 July 2003 | 2 | "Real Things" | Javine | 4 | 19 July 2003 | 1 |
| 19 July 2003 | 1 | "Business" | Eminem | 6 | 19 July 2003 | 1 |
| 19 July 2003 | 1 | "Come On Over" | Kym Marsh | 10 | 19 July 2003 | 1 |
| 26 July 2003 | 3 | "Satisfaction" | Benny Benassi presents The Biz | 2 | 26 July 2003 | 1 |
| 26 July 2003 | 1 | "Pass It On" | The Coral | 5 | 26 July 2003 | 1 |
| 26 July 2003 | 1 | "Invisible" | D-Side | 7 | 26 July 2003 | 1 |
| 2 August 2003 | 3 | "Never Gonna Leave Your Side" | Daniel Bedingfield | 1 | 2 August 2003 | 1 |
| 2 August 2003 | 1 | "Maybe Tomorrow" | Stereophonics | 3 | 2 August 2003 | 1 |
| 2 August 2003 | 1 | "Deepest Blue" | Deepest Blue | 7 | 2 August 2003 | 1 |
| 2 August 2003 | 1 | "Give Me a Reason" | Triple 8 | 9 | 2 August 2003 | 1 |
| 9 August 2003 | 7 | "Breathe" (#8) | Blu Cantrell featuring Sean Paul | 1 | 9 August 2003 | 4 |
| 9 August 2003 | 5 | "Never Leave You (Uh Oooh, Uh Oooh)" | Lumidee | 2 | 9 August 2003 | 1 |
| 9 August 2003 | 2 | "Something Beautiful" | Robbie Williams | 3 | 9 August 2003 | 1 |
| 9 August 2003 | 1 | "All In My Head" | Kosheen | 7 | 9 August 2003 | 1 |
| 9 August 2003 | 1 | "Spanish" | Craig David | 8 | 9 August 2003 | 1 |
| 16 August 2003 | 6 | "Pretty Green Eyes" | Ultrabeat | 2 | 16 August 2003 | 2 |
| 16 August 2003 | 2 | "Hooray Hooray (It's a Cheeky Holiday)" | The Cheeky Girls | 3 | 16 August 2003 | 1 |
| 16 August 2003 | 3 | "Four Minute Warning" | Mark Owen | 4 | 16 August 2003 | 1 |
| 16 August 2003 | 2 | "Frontin'" | Pharrell Williams featuring Jay-Z | 6 | 16 August 2003 | 1 |
| 16 August 2003 | 1 | "I'm in Heaven" | Jason Nevins presents U.K.N.Y featuring Holly James | 9 | 16 August 2003 | 1 |
| 23 August 2003 | 2 | "Sleeping with the Light On" | Busted | 3 | 23 August 2003 | 1 |
| 23 August 2003 | 2 | "Complete" | Jaimeson | 4 | 23 August 2003 | 1 |
| 23 August 2003 | 1 | "Finest Dreams" | Richard X featuring Kelis | 8 | 23 August 2003 | 1 |
| 23 August 2003 | 1 | "Snake" | R. Kelly featuring Big Tigger | 10 | 23 August 2003 | 1 |
| 30 August 2003 | 2 | "Dance (With U)" | Lemar | 2 | 30 August 2003 | 1 |
| 30 August 2003 | 2 | "Life Got Cold" | Girls Aloud | 3 | 30 August 2003 | 1 |
| 30 August 2003 | 1 | "Stuck" | Stacie Orrico | 9 | 30 August 2003 | 1 |
| 30 August 2003 | 1 | "The Anthem" | Good Charlotte | 10 | 30 August 2003 | 1 |
| 6 September 2003 | 3 | "Are You Ready for Love" ^{[F]} | Elton John | 1 | 6 September 2003 | 1 |
| 6 September 2003 | 2 | "Like Glue" | Sean Paul | 3 | 6 September 2003 | 1 |
| 6 September 2003 | 1 | "Miss Perfect" | Abs featuring Nodesha | 5 | 6 September 2003 | 1 |
| 6 September 2003 | 2 | "Miss Independent" | Kelly Clarkson | 6 | 6 September 2003 | 1 |
| 6 September 2003 | 1 | "Genie in a Bottle"/"Save Yourself" | Speedway | 10 | 6 September 2003 | 1 |
| 13 September 2003 | 11 | "Where Is the Love?" (#1) ^{[G]} | Black Eyed Peas | 1 | 13 September 2003 | 6 |
| 13 September 2003 | 6 | "White Flag" | Dido | 2 | 13 September 2003 | 2 |
| 13 September 2003 | 5 | "Baby Boy" | Big Brovaz | 4 | 13 September 2003 | 2 |
| 13 September 2003 | 1 | "Wildest Dreams" | Iron Maiden | 6 | 13 September 2003 | 1 |
| 13 September 2003 | 1 | "Silence Is Easy" | Starsailor | 9 | 13 September 2003 | 1 |
| 20 September 2003 | 1 | "Sunshine" | Gareth Gates | 3 | 20 September 2003 | 1 |
| 20 September 2003 | 1 | "Can't Hold Us Down" | Christina Aguilera featuring Lil' Kim | 6 | 20 September 2003 | 1 |
| 20 September 2003 | 1 | "Time Is Running Out" | Muse | 8 | 20 September 2003 | 1 |
| 20 September 2003 | 1 | "Shake Ya Tailfeather" | Nelly, P. Diddy & Murphy Lee | 10 | 20 September 2003 | 1 |
| 27 September 2003 | 5 | "Sweet Dreams My LA Ex" | Rachel Stevens | 2 | 27 September 2003 | 2 |
| 27 September 2003 | 1 | "Hey Whatever" | Westlife | 4 | 27 September 2003 | 1 |
| 27 September 2003 | 1 | "Pandora's Kiss" | Louise | 5 | 27 September 2003 | 1 |
| 27 September 2003 | 2 | "Someday" | Nickelback | 6 | 27 September 2003 | 1 |
| 27 September 2003 | 6 | "Superstar" | Jamelia | 3 | 18 October 2003 | 1 |
| 27 September 2003 | 1 | "Broken Silence" | So Solid Crew | 9 | 27 September 2003 | 1 |
| 27 September 2003 | 1 | "Eat You Alive" | Limp Bizkit | 10 | 27 September 2003 | 1 |
| 4 October 2003 | 4 | "I Believe in a Thing Called Love" | The Darkness | 2 | 4 October 2003 | 1 |
| 4 October 2003 | 2 | "Rubberneckin' (Paul Oakenfold Remix)" | Elvis Presley | 5 | 4 October 2003 | 1 |
| 4 October 2003 | 1 | "Going Under" | Evanescence | 8 | 4 October 2003 | 1 |
| 4 October 2003 | 1 | "Innocent Eyes" | Delta Goodrem | 9 | 4 October 2003 | 1 |
| 11 October 2003 | 2 | "Sundown" | S Club 8 | 4 | 11 October 2003 | 1 |
| 11 October 2003 | 1 | "Re-Offender" | Travis | 7 | 11 October 2003 | 1 |
| 11 October 2003 | 1 | "Under the Thumb" | Amy Studt | 10 | 11 October 2003 | 1 |
| 18 October 2003 | 1 | "Baby Boy" | Beyoncé featuring Sean Paul | 2 | 18 October 2003 | 1 |
| 18 October 2003 | 1 | "12:51" | The Strokes | 7 | 18 October 2003 | 1 |
| 18 October 2003 | 1 | "Carnival Girl" | Texas featuring Kardinal Offishall | 9 | 18 October 2003 | 1 |
| 18 October 2003 | 1 | "Say Cheese (Smile Please)" | Fast Food Rockers | 10 | 18 October 2003 | 1 |
| 25 October 2003 | 4 | "Hole in the Head" | Sugababes | 1 | 25 October 2003 | 1 |
| 25 October 2003 | 7 | "Turn Me On" | Kevin Lyttle | 2 | 25 October 2003 | 2 |
| 25 October 2003 | 1 | "P.I.M.P." | 50 Cent | 5 | 25 October 2003 | 1 |
| 25 October 2003 | 2 | "Maybe" | Emma Bunton | 6 | 25 October 2003 | 1 |
| 25 October 2003 | 1 | "Mixed Up World" | Sophie Ellis-Bextor | 7 | 25 October 2003 | 1 |
| 25 October 2003 | 1 | "Bad Day" | R.E.M. | 8 | 25 October 2003 | 1 |
| 1 November 2003 | 5 | "Be Faithful" | Fatman Scoop featuring The Crooklyn Clan | 1 | 1 November 2003 | 2 |
| 1 November 2003 | 3 | "Guilty" | Blue | 2 | 1 November 2003 | 1 |
| 1 November 2003 | 2 | "Jumpin'" | Liberty X | 6 | 1 November 2003 | 1 |
| 1 November 2003 | 1 | "Got Some Teeth" | Obie Trice | 8 | 1 November 2003 | 1 |
| 1 November 2003 | 1 | "So Yesterday" | Hilary Duff | 9 | 1 November 2003 | 1 |
| 8 November 2003 | 2 | "If You Come to Me" | Atomic Kitten | 3 | 8 November 2003 | 1 |
| 8 November 2003 | 2 | "Trouble" | Pink | 7 | 8 November 2003 | 1 |
| 8 November 2003 | 1 | "State of Mind" | Holly Valance | 8 | 8 November 2003 | 1 |
| 8 November 2003 | 1 | "Hold on Me" | Phixx | 10 | 8 November 2003 | 1 |
| 15 November 2003 | 2 | "Slow" | Kylie Minogue | 1 | 15 November 2003 | 1 |
| 15 November 2003 | 2 | "Flip Reverse" | Blazin' Squad | 2 | 15 November 2003 | 1 |
| 15 November 2003 | 1 | "Sexed Up" | Robbie Williams | 10 | 15 November 2003 | 1 |
| 22 November 2003 | 3 | "Crashed the Wedding" | Busted | 1 | 22 November 2003 | 1 |
| 22 November 2003 | 2 | "Me Against the Music" | Britney Spears featuring Madonna | 2 | 22 November 2003 | 1 |
| 22 November 2003 | 12 | "Hey Ya!" ♦ ^{[H]} | Outkast | 3 | 14 February 2004 | 1 |
| 22 November 2003 | 1 | "Lost for Words" | Ronan Keating | 9 | 22 November 2003 | 1 |
| 22 November 2003 | 1 | "Pass That Dutch" | Missy Elliott | 10 | 22 November 2003 | 1 |
| 29 November 2003 | 4 | "Mandy" | Westlife | 1 | 29 November 2003 | 1 |
| 29 November 2003 | 3 | "Jump" | Girls Aloud | 2 | 29 November 2003 | 1 |
| 29 November 2003 | 2 | "Maybe That's What It Takes" | Alex Parks | 3 | 29 November 2003 | 1 |
| 29 November 2003 | 1 | "50/50 & Lullaby" | Lemar | 5 | 29 November 2003 | 1 |
| 29 November 2003 | 1 | "Miracles" | Pet Shop Boys | 10 | 29 November 2003 | 1 |
| 6 December 2003 | 7 | "Leave Right Now" (#5) | Will Young | 1 | 6 December 2003 | 2 |
| 6 December 2003 | 6 | "I'm Your Man" ^{[I]} | Shane Richie | 2 | 6 December 2003 | 1 |
| 6 December 2003 | 1 | "One More Chance" | Michael Jackson | 5 | 6 December 2003 | 1 |
| 6 December 2003 | 1 | "Clap Back"/"The Reign" | Ja Rule | 9 | 6 December 2003 | 1 |
| 13 December 2003 | 7 | "Shut Up" | Black Eyed Peas | 2 | 13 December 2003 | 1 |
| 13 December 2003 | 2 | "Say It Isn't So" | Gareth Gates | 4 | 13 December 2003 | 1 |
| 13 December 2003 | 1 | "You Make Me Feel Brand New" | Simply Red | 7 | 13 December 2003 | 1 |
| 13 December 2003 | 1 | "Life for Rent" | Dido | 8 | 13 December 2003 | 1 |
| 13 December 2003 | 1 | "Real World" | D-Side | 9 | 13 December 2003 | 1 |
| 13 December 2003 | 1 | "The Closest Thing to Crazy" | Katie Melua | 10 | 13 December 2003 | 1 |
| 20 December 2003 | 7 | "Changes" (#7) | Ozzy & Kelly Osbourne | 1 | 20 December 2003 | 1 |
| 20 December 2003 | 1 | "Santa's List" | Cliff Richard | 5 | 20 December 2003 | 1 |
| 20 December 2003 | 1 | "My Immortal" | Evanescence | 7 | 20 December 2003 | 1 |
| 20 December 2003 | 1 | "The Voice Within" | Christina Aguilera | 9 | 20 December 2003 | 1 |
| 20 December 2003 | 1 | "Have a Cheeky Christmas" | The Cheeky Girls | 10 | 20 December 2003 | 1 |
| 27 December 2003 | 6 | "Mad World" (#4) | Michael Andrews featuring Gary Jules | 1 | 27 December 2003 | 3 |
| 27 December 2003 | 3 | "Christmas Time (Don't Let the Bells End)" (#10) | The Darkness | 2 | 27 December 2003 | 1 |
| 27 December 2003 | 2 | "Proper Crimbo" | Bo' Selecta! | 4 | 27 December 2003 | 2 |
| 27 December 2003 | 2 | "Happy Xmas (War Is Over)" | The Idols | 5 | 27 December 2003 | 1 |
| 27 December 2003 | 3 | "Ladies Night" | Atomic Kitten featuring Kool & the Gang | 8 | 27 December 2003 | 1 |
| 27 December 2003 | 2 | "Too Lost in You" | Sugababes | 10 | 27 December 2003 | 1 |

== Entries by artist ==
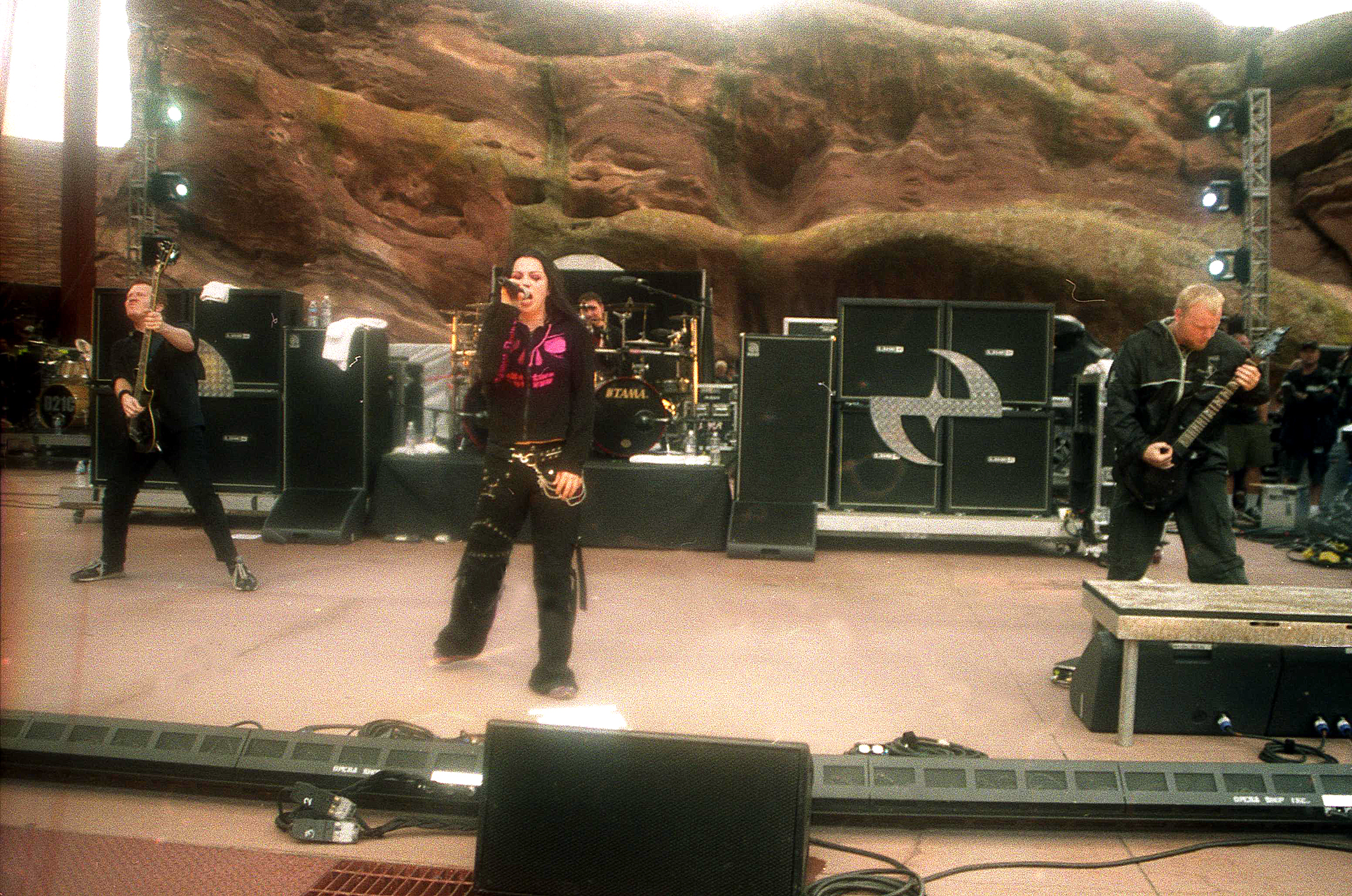
US rock band Evanescence scored three singles in the top ten this year. Their debut entry, "Bring Me to Life", remains their biggest hit, topping the chart for four weeks and spending nine weeks in the top ten altogether.

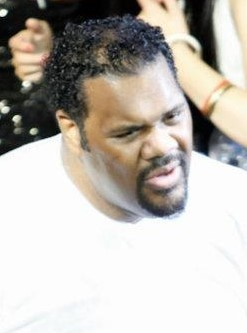
US hip hop musician Fatman Scoop reached number-one for two weeks in 2003 with his single "Be Faithful", which featured production duo The Crooklyn Clan.

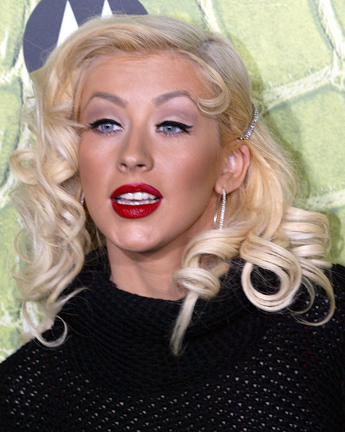
Christina Aguilera recorded four top ten entries this year. The highest-charting of these was "Beautiful", which became a number-one hit in March.

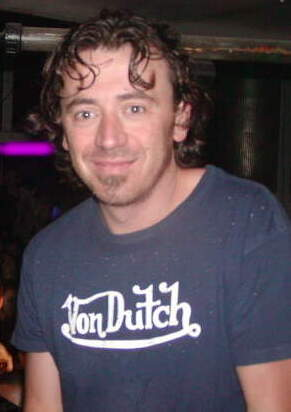
Italian DJ Benny Benassi entered the UK top ten in July 2003 with Satisfaction, which peaked at number two.

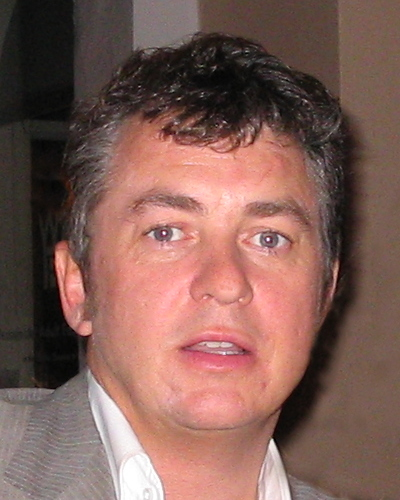
Actor and singer Shane Richie covered Wham!'s "I'm Your Man" for this year's Children in Need, taking it to number two.

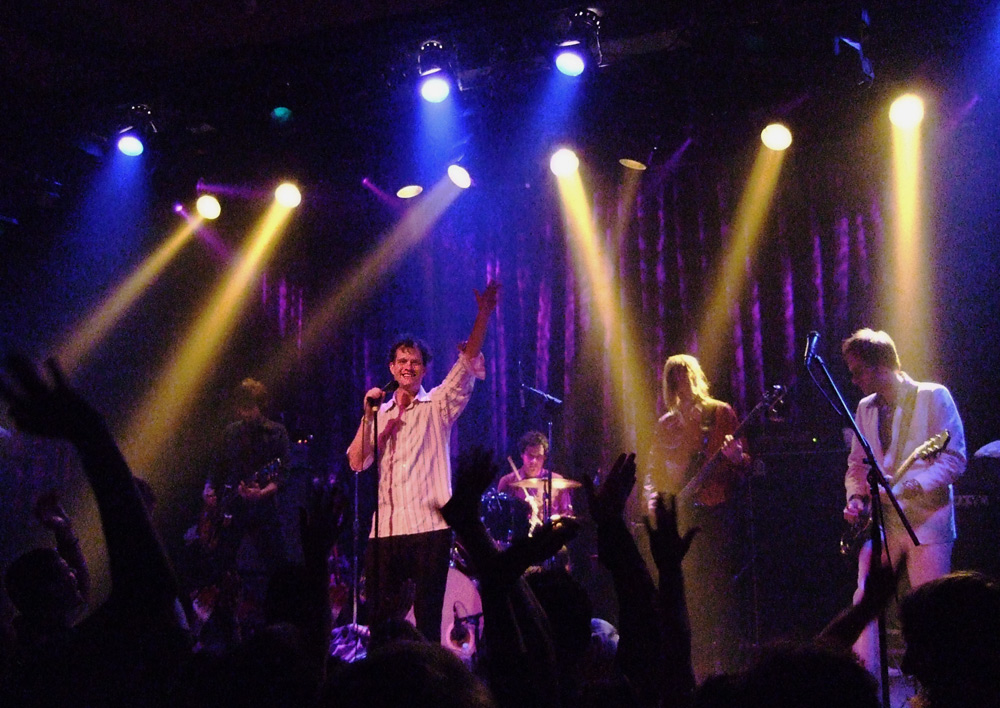
US rock band Electric Six scored two top-ten hits in the UK in 2003, most notably reaching number two in January with "Danger! High Voltage".

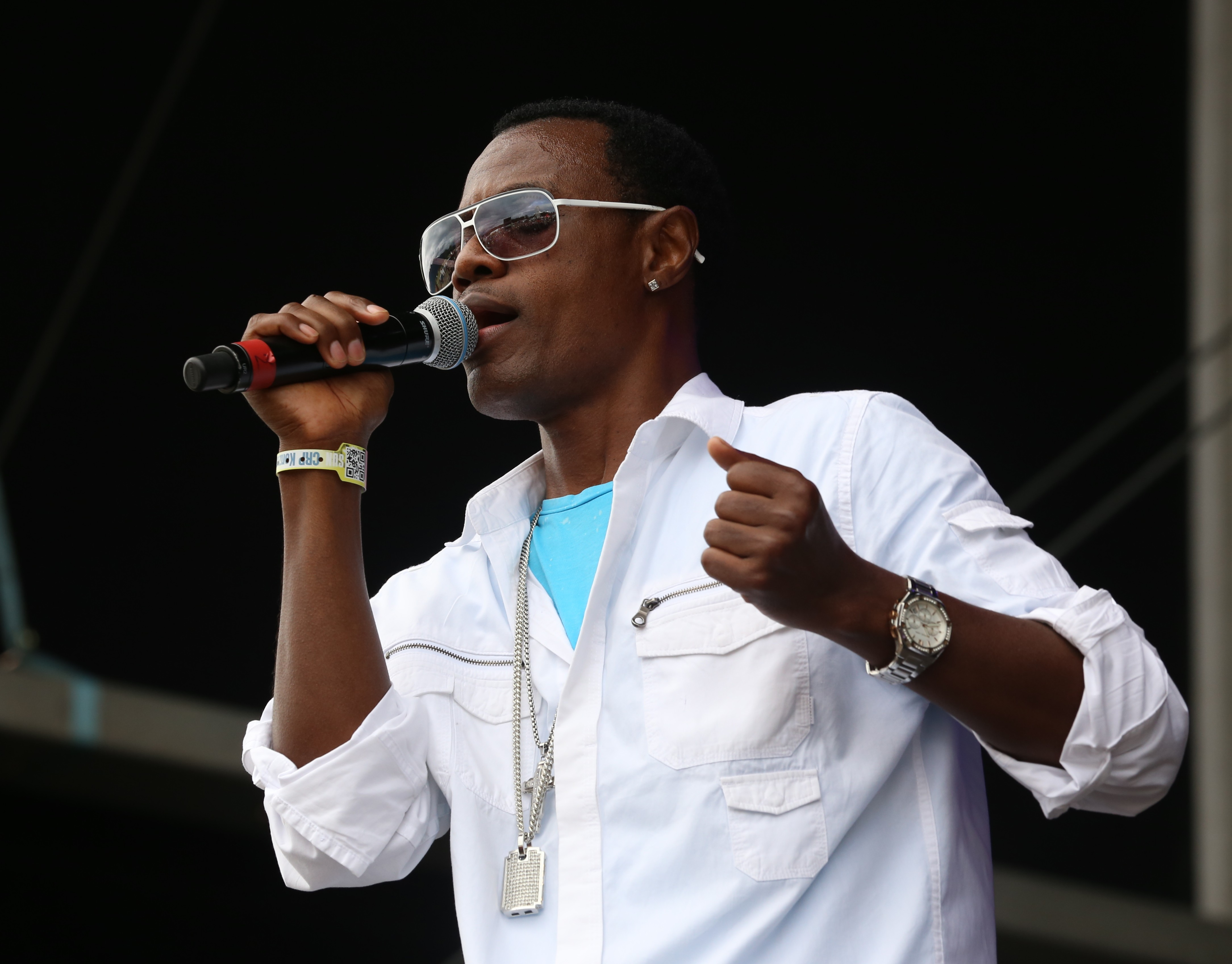
Jamaican singer Wayne Wonder spent six weeks in the UK top 10 this year with "No Letting Go", which peaked at number three.

The following table shows artists who achieved two or more top-ten entries in 2003, including singles that reached their peak in 2002. The figures include both main artists and featured artists, while appearances on ensemble charity records are also counted for each artist. The total number of weeks an artist spent in the top ten in 2003 is also shown.

| Entries | Artist | Weeks | Singles |
|---|---|---|---|
| 5 | Sean Paul ^{[J]} | 16 | "Baby Boy", "Breathe", "Get Busy", "Gimme the Light", "Like Glue" |
| 4 | Christina Aguilera | 7 | "Beautiful", "Can't Hold Us Down", "Fighter", "The Voice Within" |
| 4 | Busted | 13 | "Crashed the Wedding", "Sleeping with the Light On", "Year 3000", "You Said No" |
| 4 | The Cheeky Girls ^{[K]} | 11 | "The Cheeky Song (Touch My Bum)", "Have a Cheeky Christmas", "Hooray Hooray (It's a Cheeky Holiday)", "Take Your Shoes Off" |
| 4 | Girls Aloud ^{[K]} | 14 | "Life Got Cold", "Jump", "No Good Advice", "Sound of the Underground" |
| 4 | Justin Timberlake ^{[G]}^{[L]} | 20 | "Cry Me a River", "Rock Your Body", "Where Is the Love?", "Work It" |
| 4 | Robbie Williams ^{[K]} | 8 | "Come Undone", "Feel", "Sexed Up", "Something Beautiful" |
| 3 | 50 Cent | 11 | "21 Questions", "In da Club", "P.I.M.P." |
| 3 | Atomic Kitten | 6 | "If You Come to Me", "Ladies Night", "Love Doesn't Have to Hurt" |
| 3 | Beyoncé ^{[M]} | 10 | "'03 Bonnie & Clyde""Baby Boy", "Crazy in Love" |
| 3 | Big Brovaz | 10 | "Baby Boy", "Favourite Things", "OK" |
| 3 | Blazin' Squad | 4 | "Flip Reverse", "Reminisce"/"Where the Story Ends", "We Just Be Dreamin'" |
| 3 | Blue ^{[K]} | 9 | "Sorry Seems to Be the Hardest Word", "Guilty", "U Make Me Wanna" |
| 3 | Craig David | 6 | "Hidden Agenda", "Rise & Fall", "Spanish" |
| 3 | Daniel Bedingfield ^{[K]} | 14 | "I Can't Read You", "If You're Not the One", "Never Gonna Leave Your Side" |
| 3 | Delta Goodrem | 8 | "Born to Try", "Innocent Eyes, "Lost Without You" |
| 3 | D-Side | 3 | "Invisible", "Real World", "Speechless" |
| 3 | Eminem ^{[K]} | 15 | "Business", "Lose Yourself", "Sing for the Moment" |
| 3 | Evanescence | 11 | "Bring Me to Life", "Going Under", "My Immortal" |
| 3 | Gareth Gates | 9 | "Say It Isn't So", "Spirit in the Sky", "Sunshine" |
| 3 | Good Charlotte | 3 | "Girls & Boys", "Lifestyles of the Rich and Famous", "The Anthem" |
| 3 | Kelly Rowland ^{[K]}^{[N]} | 15 | "Can't Nobody", "Dilemma", "Stole" |
| 3 | Madonna ^{[O]} | 4 | "American Life", "Hollywood", "Me Against the Music" |
| 3 | Nelly ^{[K]} | 11 | "Dilemma, "Shake Ya Tailfeather", "Work It" |
| 3 | Westlife | 7 | "Hey Whatever", "Mandy", "Tonight"/"Miss You Nights" |
| 2 | Abs | 2 | "Stop Sign", "Miss Perfect" |
| 2 | Amy Studt | 2 | "Misfit", "Under the Thumb" |
| 2 | Avril Lavigne ^{[P]} | 4 | "I'm with You", "Sk8er Boi" |
| 2 | Black Eyed Peas | 14 | "Shut Up", "Where Is the Love?" |
| 2 | The Coral | 2 | "Don't Think You're the First", "Pass It On" |
| 2 | Dannii Minogue | 3 | "Don't Wanna Lose This Feeling", "I Begin to Wonder" |
| 2 | The Darkness | 5 | "Christmas Time (Don't Let the Bells End)", "I Believe In A Thing Called Love" |
| 2 | David Sneddon | 7 | "Don't Let Go", "Stop Living the Lie", |
| 2 | Dido | 7 | "Life for Rent", "White Flag" |
| 2 | DJ Sammy | 4 | "Sunlight", "The Boys of Summer" |
| 2 | Electric Six | 3 | "Danger! High Voltage", "Gay Bar" |
| 2 | Elton John ^{[K]}^{[Q]} | 6 | "Are You Ready for Love", "Sorry Seems to Be the Hardest Word" |
| 2 | Emma Bunton | 3 | "Free Me", "Maybe" |
| 2 | Fast Food Rockers | 6 | "Fast Food Song", "Say Cheese (Smile Please)" |
| 2 | Jaimeson | 4 | "Complete", "True" |
| 2 | Jay-Z ^{[R]} | 5 | "'03 Bonnie & Clyde", "Frontin'" |
| 2 | Kym Marsh | 4 | "Come On Over", "Cry" |
| 2 | Lemar | 3 | "Dance (With U)", "50/50 & Lullaby" |
| 2 | Liberty X | 4 | "Being Nobody", "Jumpin'" |
| 2 | Love Inc. ^{[K]} | 4 | "Broken Bones", "You're a Superstar" |
| 2 | Mis-Teeq | 5 | "Can't Get It Back", "Scandalous" |
| 2 | Missy Elliott | 2 | "Gossip Folks", "Pass That Dutch" |
| 2 | One True Voice ^{[K]} | 4 | "Sacred Trust"/"After You're Gone", "Shakespeare's (Way with) Words" |
| 2 | Pink | 5 | "Feel Good Time", "Trouble" |
| 2 | R. Kelly | 11 | "Ignition (Remix)", "Snake" |
| 2 | Rachel Stevens ^{[S]} | 8 | "Say Goodbye"/"Love Ain't Gonna Wait for You", "Sweet Dreams My LA Ex" |
| 2 | Richard X | 3 | "Being Nobody", "Finest Dreams" |
| 2 | S Club 8 | 3 | "Fool No More", "Sundown" |
| 2 | Shania Twain | 2 | "Ka-Ching!", "Forever and for Always" |
| 2 | Simply Red | 3 | "Sunrise", "You Make Me Feel Brand New" |
| 2 | Stereophonics | 2 | "Madame Helga", "Maybe Tomorrow" |
| 2 | Sugababes | 5 | "Hole in the Head", "Too Lost in You" |
| 2 | t.A.T.u. | 7 | "All the Things She Said", "Not Gonna Get Us" |
| 2 | Triple 8 | 2 | "Give Me a Reason", "Knockout" |

== Notes ==
- ^{a} "Dilemma" re-entered the top ten at number 10 on 11 January 2003 (week ending).
- ^{b} Released as the official single for Comic Relief.
- ^{c} "Born to Try" re-entered the top ten at number 10 on 12 April 2003 (week ending). It rose to number 9 again on 19 April 2003 (week ending).
- ^{d} "Husan" was used in a television commercial for Peugeot in 2003.
- ^{e} "Fly on the Wings of Love" re-entered the top ten at number 8 on 5 July 2003 (week ending), dropped out two weeks later, and re-entered for a second time on 26 July 2003 (week ending), rising to number 8 again on 2 August 2003 (week ending) and spending one more week in the top ten.
- ^{f} "Are You Ready for Love" was used by Sky Sports to promote their coverage of Premiership football. It was first released in 1979 when it only charted at number 42.
- ^{g} Justin Timberlake was not credited on the single cover of "Where Is The Love?" but he contributed vocals to the song.
- ^{h} "Hey Ya" re-entered the top 10 on 17 January 2004 (week ending).
- ^{i} Released as the official single for Children in Need.
- ^{j} Figure includes appearances on Beyonce's "Baby Boy" and Blu Cantrell's "Breathe".
- ^{k} Figure includes single that peaked in 2002.
- ^{l} Figure includes appearances on The Black Eyed Peas' "Where Is the Love?" and Nelly's "Work It".
- ^{m} Figure includes appearance on Jay-Z's "'03 Bonnie & Clyde".
- ^{n} Figure includes appearance on Nelly's "Dilemma".
- ^{o} Figure includes appearance on Britney Spears' "Me Against the Music".
- ^{p} Figure includes single that first charted in 2002 but peaked in 2003.
- ^{q} Figure includes appearance on Blue's "Sorry Seems to Be the Hardest Word".
- ^{r} Figure includes appearance on Pharrell Williams' "Frontin'".
- ^{s} Figure includes a top-ten hit with the group S Club.

== See also ==
- 2003 in British music
- List of number-one singles from the 2000s (UK)
