= 2003 in British music =

This is a summary of 2003 in music in the United Kingdom.

== Events ==
- 6 January – The annual Park Lane Group Young Artists festival of contemporary music opens with two concerts in the Purcell Room at the Southbank Centre, London. The first concert, given by the Gallimaufry Ensemble, included the premiere of a new wind quintet by 23-year-old Benjamin Wallfisch; the second concert featured solo bass clarinettist Sarah Watts, who premiered Marc Yeats' Vox for solo bass clarinet and Michael Smetanin's Ladder of Escape for bass clarinet with prerecorded ensemble of six bass and two contrabass clarinets.
- 10 January – Following an investigation by The International Federation of the Phonographic Industry and London detectives, police raids in the UK and the Netherlands recover 500 original Beatles studio tapes, recorded during the Let It Be sessions. Five people are arrested. The tapes have been used for bootleg releases for years.
- 13 January – The Who guitarist Pete Townshend is arrested on suspicion of possessing and making indecent images of children and of incitement to distribute them. Townshend claims in a statement that he did not download any such images and accessed Web sites advertising child pornography because he was researching material for his autobiography, which will include passages about his abusive childhood.
- 18 January – A two-day festival of the music of Mark-Anthony Turnage is given at the Barbican Centre, London, with three world premieres and chamber concerts by the Nash Ensemble and the Birmingham Contemporary Music Group.
- 21 April – S Club announce live on stage at London's Docklands Arena that they are to split after five years together. Their final single, "Say Goodbye", enters the chart at #2 a month after the announcement. Rachel Stevens from the group launched her successful solo career shortly afterwards with the song "Sweet Dreams My LA Ex".
- 2 May – Mansun confirm that they have split up, after months of speculation and after the departure of Stove King. The remaining members had until that point worked on an unfinished 4th studio album, which was eventually released a year later as "Kleptomania" due to fan demand.
- 7 May – Pete Townshend is cleared of the charges stemming from his arrest in January on suspicion of possessing child pornography, but is formally cautioned and placed on the sex offenders register for five years.
- 24 May
  - The Eurovision Song Contest is held in Riga, Latvia. "Cry Baby", performed by Jemini, receives no points in the voting, the worst-ever result for the UK until after 2021. Some blame the United Kingdom's involvement in the Iraq War, whilst others attribute the result to a bad performance.
  - After a 40-year gap, former Beatle Paul McCartney performs in Russia, on the Red Square in Moscow.
- 27–29 June – Glastonbury Festival, U.K., headline acts included David Gray, Primal Scream, Morcheeba, The Flaming Lips, Radiohead, Super Furry Animals, Lamb, Feeder, Manic Street Preachers, and Doves.
- 7 September – Pete Doherty receives a 6-month prison sentence for stealing items from bandmate Carl Barat's flat. The sentence is reduced, and Doherty is released a month later.
- 14 November – The legal incarnation of the band Pink Floyd reunites to perform at the funeral of their manager Steve O'Rourke.
- 6 December – Elvis Costello and Diana Krall are married in a private ceremony at Elton John's estate.
- 8 December – Ozzy Osbourne is rushed into emergency surgery after having a serious accident riding an all-terrain vehicle on the grounds of his English estate. Osbourne broke his collarbone, eight ribs and a vertebra in his neck.
- 12 December – Mick Jagger is knighted for services to music by the Prince of Wales (now Charles III) at Buckingham Palace.
- 18 December – John Rutter tells US television programme 60 Minutes that he is not a particularly religious man yet still deeply spiritual and inspired by the spirituality of sacred verses and prayers.

== Classical music ==
Both Andrew Glover and Peter Maxwell Davies produced several new orchestral/instrumental works. British film score composer Rachel Portman produced an opera, The Little Prince, commissioned by the Houston Opera and premièred in the USA.

Michael Nyman, during his period as Composer-in-Residence at Badisches Staatstheater in Karlsruhe, Germany, produced his Violin Concerto and an opera Man and Boy: Dada, with libretto by Michael Hastings. It was premièred at the Badisches Staatstheater Karlsruhe in the following year.

== Other classical works ==
- Howard Goodall – "O Lord God of Time and Eternity"
- Alun Hoddinott – Lizard: Concerto for orchestra
- John Tavener – The Veil of the Temple (2003; soprano, SATB choir, boys' choir, ensemble)
- Graham Waterhouse – Bassoon Quintet

== Opera ==
- Keith Burstein – Manifest Destiny

== Film and incidental music ==
- Anne Dudley – Bright Young Things
- Patrick Doyle – Calendar Girls
- Nicholas Hooper – The Heart of Me
- Michael Nyman – The Actors

== Musical films ==
- Bollywood Queen
- Love Actually (comedy with a popular music score)
- Seeing Double, starring S Club

== Deaths ==
- 2 January – Eric Jupp, composer, arranger and conductor, 80
- 5 January
  - Doreen Carwithen, composer, widow of William Alwyn, 80
  - Daphne Oram, electronic musician and composer, 77
- 8 January – Ron Goodwin, composer, 77
- 11 January – Mickey Finn, bongo player and T.Rex sideman, 55 (liver failure)
- 12 January – Maurice Gibb, musician and singer-songwriter, 53 (heart attack).
- 19 January – Remo Lauricella, violinist and composer, 90
- 30 January – Mary Ellis, musical comedy star, 105
- 8 March – Adam Faith, singer and actor, 62 (heart attack)
- 13 March – Ian Samwell, musician and singer-songwriter, 66
- 4 May – Arthur Oldham, composer and choirmaster, 76
- 30 May – Mickie Most, record producer, 64 (mesothelioma)
- 6 June – Dave Rowberry, singer-songwriter and pianist (The Animals), 62
- 2 August – Don Estelle, actor and singer, 70
- 18 August – Tony Jackson, English singer and bass player, 63
- 9 September – Reginald Smith Brindle, composer and writer, 86
- 25 September – Matthew Jay, singer-songwriter, 24 (fell from window)
- 26 September – Robert Palmer, singer, 54 (heart attack)
- 4 October – Freddie Phillips, guitarist and composer of children's TV themes (age unknown)
- 13 October – Anne Ziegler, soprano, 93
- 27 November – Dai Francis, singer, 73
- 11 December – Malcolm Clarke, composer, 60

== Music awards ==
=== BRIT Awards ===
The 2003 BRIT Awards winners were:

- Best British Male Solo Artist: Robbie Williams
- Best British Female Solo Artist: Ms. Dynamite
- Best British Group: Coldplay
- Best British Album: Coldplay – A Rush of Blood to the Head
- Best British Urban Act: Ms Dynamite
- Best British Dance Act: Sugababes
- British Breakthrough Artist: Will Young
- Best International Male: Eminem
- Best International Female: Pink
- Best International Group: Red Hot Chili Peppers
- International Breakthrough Artist: Norah Jones
- Best International Album: Eminem – The Eminem Show
- Best British Single: Liberty X – "Just a Little"
- Best Pop Act: Blue
- Outstanding Contribution: Tom Jones

=== Ivor Novello Awards ===
The winners of the Ivor Novello Awards were:

- Best Song Musically and Lyrically – "Leave Right Now" – Will Young, written by Francis White
- Best Contemporary Song – "Stronger Than Me" – Amy Winehouse, written by Winehouse and Salaam Remi
- The Ivors Dance Award – "Strict Machine" – Goldfrapp, written by Alison Goldfrapp, William Gregory and Nick Batt
- PRS Most Performed Song – "Superstar" – Jamelia, written by Mich Hansen, Joseph Belmaati and Remee
- International Hit of the Year – "White Flag" – Dido, written by Dido Armstrong, Rollo Armstrong and Rick Nowels
- Best Selling UK Single – "Mad World" – Michael Andrews ft. Gary Jules, written by Roland Orzabal
- Songwriters of the Year – The Darkness (Justin Hawkins, Dan Hawkins, Frankie Poullain, Ed Graham)

=== Mercury Music Prize ===
The 2003 Mercury Music Prize was awarded to Dizzee Rascal for his debut studio album Boy in Da Corner.

=== Popjustice £20 Music Prize ===
The 2003 Popjustice £20 Music Prize was awarded to Girls Aloud for their song No Good Advice from the album Sound of the Underground.

=== The Record of the Year ===
The Record of the Year was awarded to "Mandy" by Westlife.

== See also ==
- 2003 in British music charts
- 2003 in British radio
- 2003 in British television
- 2003 in the United Kingdom
- List of British films of 2003
