= Finally (Kings of Tomorrow song) =

2001 single by The Kings of Tomorrow featuring Julie McKnight

Single by The Kings of Tomorrow featuring Julie McKnight

from the album It's in the Lifestyle
- Released: 2001
- Label: Defected
- Songwriter: Jason "Sinister" Sealee
- Producer: Sandy Rivera

"Finally" is a song by American house music project Kings of Tomorrow featuring Julie McKnight. The song was written by Jason Sealee and produced by Sandy Rivera. In the United Kingdom, the song was released as a single in 2001 and peaked at number 24 on the UK Singles Chart. In the United States, the song reached number 17 on the Billboard Dance Club Songs chart in 2002. The song was nominated for Record of the Year at the DanceStar USA Awards in 2002.

"Love Story (vs. Finally)", a remix of Layo & Bushwacka!'s 2002 dance hit "Love Story", interpolates Julie McKnight's vocals from the Kings of Tomorrow song.

In 2018, Jess Glynne released "All I Am" which sampled the "Finally" beat.

== Charts ==
Chart performance for "Finally"
Chart (2001–2002)	Peak position
UK Singles (Official Charts)	24
UK Dance (Official Charts)	2
UK Indie (Official Charts)	8
US Dance Club Songs (Billboard)	17

== Certifications ==
Region	Certification	Certified units/sales
United Kingdom (BPI)	Silver	200,000^{‡}
^{‡} Sales+streaming figures based on certification alone.

== Swedish House Mafia and Alicia Keys version ==
"Finally"

Single by Swedish House Mafia and Alicia Keys
- Released: August 29, 2024
- Recorded: 2022
- Length: 3:35
- Label: SSA; Republic; Universal
- Songwriters: Jay "Sinister" Sealee; Sandy Rivera
- Producers: Swedish House Mafia; YARO; Klahr; Gino Nano

Swedish House Mafia singles chronology
"Lioness" (2024)	"Finally" (2024)	"Wait So Long" (2025)

Alicia Keys singles chronology
"Kaleidoscope" (2024)	"Finally" (2024)	"L'Aurora" (2025)

"Finally" was recorded by Swedish supergroup Swedish House Mafia and American singer-songwriter Alicia Keys. The song was released as a single on August 29, 2024, through SS Recording, Republic Records and Universal Music Group.

=== Background and release ===
In 2022, "Finally" was remade by Swedish House Mafia and Alicia Keys. Swedish House Mafia first previewed the song at Chase Center in San Francisco on their Paradise Again World Tour. In April 2024, Swedish House Mafia and Keys teased the song on social media, sparking speculation that their collaboration will be released soon. Swedish House Mafia played a new version of the song at Lucca Summer Festival on June 30, 2024. Additionally, Swedish House Mafia played the song at Tomorrowland on July 19 and on July 26, 2024. In August 2024, Swedish House Mafia continued to tease the song on social media, posting a live clip of the track being played with the caption, "Finally, right??". Sebastian Ingrosso also posted an Instagram Stories with the caption "next week".

The song was made available on digital and streaming platforms on August 29, 2024. On August 30, 2024, it was sent to Italian radios through Island Records.

=== Personnel ===
- Written by Jay Sealee and Sandy Rivera
- Produced by Axwell, Steve Angello, Sebastian Ingrosso, Gino Nano, Yaro and Klahr
- Lead vocals: Alicia Keys
- Engineered by Yaro, Klahr, Alicia Keys, Axwell, Steve Angello, Sebastian Ingrosso and Gino Nano
- Assistant engineer: Frank Holland, Steven Tejeda and Roberto Regeiro
- Mixed by Kevin Granger

=== Charts ===
==== Weekly charts ====
Weekly chart performance
Chart (2024–2025)	Peak position
Estonia Airplay (TopHit)	78
Hungary (Dance Top 40)	4
Italy Airplay (EarOne)	46
Latvia Airplay (TopHit)	131
Lithuania Airplay (TopHit)	16
New Zealand Hot Singles (RMNZ)	18
San Marino Airplay (SMRTV Top 50)	46
Sweden (Sverigetopplistan)	75
Ukraine Airplay (TopHit)	69
UK Singles Downloads (Official Charts)	32
UK Singles Sales (OCC)	34
US Hot Dance/Electronic Songs (Billboard)	26

==== Monthly charts ====
Monthly chart performance
Chart (2024)	Peak position
Estonia Airplay (TopHit)	89
Lithuania Airplay (TopHit)	15
Ukraine Airplay (TopHit)	97

==== Year-end charts ====
Year-end chart performance
Chart (2025)	Peak position
Hungary (Dance Top 40)	47

=== Certifications ===
Region	Certification	Certified units/sales
Brazil (Pro-Música Brasil)	Gold	20,000^{‡}
^{‡} Sales+streaming figures based on certification alone.
