= Love Story (vs. Finally) =

Single by Layo & Bushwacka!

from the album Night Works
- Released: 13 January 2003
- Recorded: West End of London, England
- Length: 3:36
- Label: XL Recordings
- Producers: Layo Paskin; Matthew Benjamin

Layo & Bushwacka! singles chronology
"Ear Candy" (1999)	"Love Story (vs. Finally)" (2003)	"It's Up to You (Shining Through)" (2003)

"Love Story (vs. Finally)" (also known as "Love Story") is a song written and released by British duo Layo & Bushwacka!. It was originally released in 2002 under the name "Love Story", charting at number 4 on the US Billboard Hot Dance Club Play Chart. The remix single was released in January 2003 and peaked at number 8 in the United Kingdom, spending one week in the top 10. The song uses samples from Nina Simone's "Rags & Old Iron" and Devo's "Mongoloid". The "Finally" portion of the single is a vocal from the single "Finally" by the American house music project The Kings of Tomorrow featuring Julie McKnight, which reached number 17 on the Billboard Dance Club Songs chart in 2000. The synth hook of the song is sampled in the song "Boladona" by Tati Quebra Barraco.

== Background ==
According to Bushwacka, the track’s foundation was built through sampling: Layo sourced a bass line from Devo’s “Mongoloid” and a piano stab (slightly off-tune) from another record, which were recorded and time-matched in their studio using an E-MU E64 sampler. They also incorporated a vocal snippet from Nina Simone’s “Rags & Old Iron”; the snippet was initially obscure in meaning, and the duo did not fully understand what she was singing for a while. Because their original release of “Love Story” had strong underground support, the duo’s label later proposed merging it with the acapella vocal from “Finally” (by Kings of Tomorrow featuring Julie McKnight), creating the “vs. Finally” version that broadened its appeal.

== Critical reception ==
“Love Story” is frequently celebrated as one of the key dance anthems of the 2000s — an ArcticReviews list placed it at #98 among “100 Greatest Songs of the ’00s,” noting how its unlikely mix of Devo bass, soulful piano, and Nina Simone sample coalesced into something memorable. DJ Mag also refers to it as a “seminal track that changed dance music forever,” highlighting its cross-genre reach.

== Charts ==
=== Weekly charts ===
Chart (2000–2001)	Peak position
Europe (Eurochart Hot 100)	29
Netherlands (Single Top 100)	96
Scotland Singles (OCC)	11
UK Singles (OCC)	8
UK Dance (OCC)	1
US Dance Club Play (Billboard)	4

=== Year-end charts ===
Chart (2000)	Position
UK Singles (OCC)	140

== Certifications ==
Region	Certification	Certified units/sales
United Kingdom (BPI)	Silver	200,000^{‡}
^{‡} Sales+streaming figures based on certification alone.
