= Sandy Rivera =

American musician

Sandy Rivera (born January 18, 1971) is an American house music DJ, record producer and label owner. Born in New York City, he is now based in New Jersey.

== Biography ==
Rivera started his career at age 13 as a DJ in his native Spanish Harlem. He began producing house music in 1992, specializing in a more soulful sound. He has worked under a variety of pseudonyms, including Kings of Tomorrow, Soul Vision and Mysterious People, either alone or with partners Jose Burgos, HAZE and Jay 'Sinister' Sealee (Rivera parted ways with Sealee in 2002). He is the owner of labels BlackWiz (founded 1993) and Deep Vision Records (founded in 1995).

Rivera's best known track is "Finally", released in 2000 under the alias Kings of Tomorrow on Distance Records, with vocals by Julie McKnight, which peaked at number 24 on the UK Singles Chart and at number 17 on the Billboard dance chart, and appeared in a large number of compilations from labels such as Defected Records, Ministry of Sound, Hed Kandi, and Warner Music. The track is included on K.O.T.'s first album It's in the Lifestyle. The same album also yielded the track "Young Hearts". The vocal version of "Finally" was also used as part of a remixed single by the British act Layo & Bushwacka for their 2003 single "Love Story (vs. Finally)". The second K.O.T. album was released in 2005, titled Trouble. Rivera claimed that the album was his first produced without recourse to samples, and marked the official separation between this and other aliases: Kings of Tomorrow is used for more radio-friendly tracks, while his real name was to be used for club-friendly tracks.

As a producer and remixer, Rivera has worked for a variety of other artists, including veteran jazz musician Terry Callier, Gisele Jackson, Bini & Martini, Michelle Weeks, Ladysmith Black Mambazo and Walter L. Robinson.

== Discography ==
=== Albums ===
- 1998 The Beginning, as Kings of Tomorrow (not a K.O.T. album, includes various tracks produced or remixed by Rivera; the CD version is mixed)
- 2000 The Calling, as Sandy Rivera & Jose Burgos
- 2000 It's in the Lifestyle, as Kings of Tomorrow
- 2000 It's in the Lifestyle - Limited Edition, as Kings of Tomorrow
- 2001 Kings of Tomorrow Sessions - Mixed by Sandy Rivera
- 2002 It's in the Lifestyle - The Remixes, as Kings of Tomorrow
- 2005 Trouble, as Kings of Tomorrow

=== Singles ===
Sandy Rivera

- 1996 The King Size EP
- 1997 "Come On", with Jon Cutler and Mike Delgado
- 1997 "Expansions '97/Head Hunters"
- 1998 "Come into My Room", with Littleton Brown
- 2001 "Class Is in Session"
- 2001 "Forever", with John "DNR" Alvarez and Shawnee Taylor
- 2002 "Changes", with HAZE
- 2002 "I Can't Stop", with Littleton Brown
- 2005 "Hope", with Elzi Hall
- 2005 "Just Won't Do", with Robert Owens
- 2007 "Freak", with HAZE
- 2009 "Deeper", with HAZE
- 2009 "Whatever", with Andy Daniell
- 2017 "Try a Little Tenderness"

Sandy Rivera & Jose Burgos

All are collaborations with Jose Burgos.

- 1997 "The Path"
- 1999 Expanded EP
- 2000 "12th Street Soul"
- 2000 "Keep It Coming"
- 2000 "I Wanna Dance with You", with Karen Workman
- 2000 "No Smoke"
- 2001 "Leaving Me"
- 2001 La Cultura EP

Kings of Tomorrow/K.O.T.

- 1993 D'Menace EP, with John "DNR" Alvarez
- 1993 Showcase EP, with George Rivera
- 1993 "Go Black Scatt", with George Rivera
- 1994 "Abstract Collage"
- 1994 Black Sinister Science EP, with Jay 'Sinister' Sealee and Stacey Alexander
- 1995 "I'm So Grateful", with Densaid
- 1996 "10 Minute High", with Jay 'Sinister' Sealee and Michelle Weeks
- 1996 "Fade II Black", with Jay 'Sinister' Sealee
- 1996 "Open Your Mind/K.O.T. Anthem", with Jay 'Sinister' Sealee
- 1997 "Set My Spirit Free", with Dawn Tallman
- 1997 "Ancestors", with Jay 'Sinister' Sealee
- 1997 Witness Protection EP
- 1997 "The Session"
- 1997 "Organic Warfare", with Jay 'Sinister' Sealee
- 1998 "I Want You (For Myself)", with Jay 'Sinister' Sealee and Julie McKnight
- 1998 "Let It Go", with Dawn Tallman
- 1998 The Blackwiz EP
- 1998 The K.O.T. Invasion EP, with Jay 'Sinister' Sealee
- 1999 "My Love Is Real", with Jay 'Sinister' Sealee
- 2000 Going Back to Blackwiz EP, with Jose Burgos and Jay 'Sinister' Sealee
- 2000 "In the Night", with Littleton Brown
- 2000 "Finally", with Jay 'Sinister' Sealee and Julie McKnight
- 2000 "Tear It Up", with Jay 'Sinister' Sealee and Julie McKnight
- 2001 "Class Is in Session"
- 2002 "Young Hearts", with Treasa Fennie
- 2003 "Dreams/Thru", with HAZE and George Rivera
- 2004 "Dreams", with HAZE
- 2004 "So Alive"
- 2005 "Another Day", with Leedia Urtega
- 2005 "Thru", with HAZE
- 2005 "6PM", with Nina Lares
- 2008 "Can't Stop", with Rae
- 2011 "Take Me Back", with April
- 2011 "I Need to Love Me", with April
- 2012 "Show Me", with Elzi Hall
- 2013 "Fall for You" with April
- 2016 "Kaoz"
- 2016 "Closer" with Alex Mills
- 2016 "Please" with Random Soul
- 2018 "Faded" with Kandace Springs

Soul Vision

All are collaborations with Jose Burgos.

- 1998 "Don't Stop", with Littleton Brown
- 1999 "Low Down", with Jaquito May Perkins
- 2000 "Don't Hold Back", with Dihann Moore
- 2000 "Tracey in My Room", as EBTG vs. Soul Vision (official mash-up produced by Ben Watt)
- 2001 "You've Been on My Mind", with D'Layna

Mysterious People
All are collaborations with Jay 'Sinister' Sealee.

- 1996 "Love Revolution"
- 1997 The Rude Movements EP
- 1998 "Fly Away"

D'Menace

- 1997 "Spirit in My Soul"
- 1997 "Ya-Yahoo!"
- 1998 "Deep Menace (Spank)"

Other aliases

- 1992 "Right Now/Break the Ice", as Awesome Foursome, with George Rivera, Wilson X. Yepez and Víctor "Overdose" Sánchez
- 1994 "The K.O.T. Theory of Rhythmic Seduction", as Kidz of Tomorrow, with Jose Burgos
- 1995 "The Blackwiz", as Ancestors, with Treasa Fennie
- 2000 "Free Call", as Delicious Inc meets Sandy Rivera, with Jamie Lewis and Littleton Brown
- 2000 "Scream & Shout", as The Committee, with Jose Burgos, Jay 'Sinister' Sealee and Kim Armstrong
- 2001 "Life", as Auréi
- 2001 "Let the Reign Begin", as Organized Noize, with John "DNR" Alvarez
- 2001 "I am the Drum", as Organized Noize, with Chris "Ludikris" Conway
- 2002 Keep Flowing EP, as Sanjose, with Jose Burgos
- 2003 "Moodbangers", as Moodbangers
- 2004 "Midnight Express", as Moodbangers, with John Alvarez

=== (Co-)productions for other artists ===
- 1993 Trique-Dik-Slik - "Euphoria (Mary Jane Too)", with Jay 'Sinister' Sealée and Eric Priest
- 1995 Michelle Wilson- "Lifted Higher"
- 1995 Sabrynaah Pope - "Shelter"
- 1995 Big O - "Shmoov wit da Ruffness"
- 1996 Sean Grant - "I Hear My Calling", with Jay 'Sinister' Sealée
- 1996 Sean Grant - "Keep On Pressing", with Jay 'Sinister' Sealée
- 1997 Gisele Jackson - "Happy Feelings"
- 1997 Julie McKnight - "Rock Steady", Jay 'Sinister' Sealée
- 1997 Big Foot - "Black Lagoons"
- 2003 GR-69 - "Trouble"
- 2007 DADA - "Lollipop", with Trix - #18 UK
- 2014 Ivy Queen - "Cuando Las Mujeres" (Remix)
