= Jumpin' (Liberty X song) =

2003 single by Liberty X

Single by Liberty X

from the album Being Somebody
- B-side: "It Helps"; "Never Meant to Say Goodbye"
- Released: 20 October 2003
- Length: 3:41
- Label: V2
- Songwriters: Lucie Silvas, Charlie Russell, Mike Peden
- Producer: Mike Peden

Liberty X singles chronology
"Being Nobody" (2003)	"Jumpin'" (2003)	"Everybody Cries" (2004)

"Jumpin'" is a song by English-Irish pop group Liberty X. It was released in the United Kingdom via CD and DVD on 20 October 2003 as the second single from their second studio album, Being Somebody (2003). The song was co-written by singer-songwriter Lucie Silvas, Charlie Russell and Mike Peden. It was showcased during Liberty X's sold-out arena tour in early 2003, quickly becoming a fan favourite.

The song debuted and peaked at number six on the UK Singles Chart. It also charted at number 16 on the Irish Singles Chart, number 78 on the Australian Singles Chart, number 55 on the Dutch Singles Chart, and number 56 on the French Singles Chart.

== Background ==
"Jumpin'" was one of the first songs to be recorded by Liberty X following the release of their debut studio album, Thinking It Over. The single was highly popular amongst fan circles and DJs alike, with a number of remixes appearing on the second physical single release. Tony Lundon told Newsround: "Jumpin' we chose as a single because it just worked well on the tour and it's the kind of song we want to sing. We don't really have a master plan!"

It was also the band's first single not to be released on Cassette, following the decline of the format that began in July 2003. The single also included two B-sides: "It Helps", a brand new track penned by band member Tony Lundon, and a remix of one of the band's former B-sides, "Never Meant to Say Goodbye".

== Music video ==
The music video for the track was filmed in an underground arena, depicting the band held in cages, and dancing on a circular platform. It also used scenes of CGI, similarly to that of the "Just a Little" video. Despite the release of a DVD single, the video for "Jumpin'" was not included, and its official release did not occur until that of the "Everybody Cries" DVD single in January 2004.

== Track listings ==
- UK CD single 1
1. "Jumpin'" – 3:41
2. "It Helps" – 4:32
3. "Never Meant to Say Goodbye" (remix) – 4:38
- UK CD single 2
1. "Jumpin'" (JD Remix) – 4:03
2. "Jumpin'" (DND Remix) – 5:20
3. "Jumpin'" (The American Desi Mix) – 3:41
4. "Jumpin'" (Shanghai Surprise Mix) – 6:33
- UK DVD single
1. "Jumpin'" (making of the video) – 2:00
2. "Jumpin'" (audio) – 3:41
3. "Shake It" (audio) – 4:05
- French CD single
1. "Jumpin'" – 3:41
2. "It Helps" – 4:32
3. "Jumpin'" (video) – 3:37
- German CD single
1. "Jumpin'" – 3:41
2. "It Helps" – 4:32
3. "Never Meant to Say Goodbye" (remix) – 4:38
4. "Jumpin'" (Groove Collision Remix) – 6:58
5. "Jumpin'" (video) – 3:37

== Charts ==
=== Weekly charts ===
Chart (2003–2004)	Peak position
Australia (ARIA)	78
Belgium (Ultratip Bubbling Under Wallonia)	3
Finland (Suomen virallinen lista)	17
France (SNEP)	56
Ireland (IRMA)	16
Netherlands (Single Top 100)	55
Scottish Singles Sales (Official Charts)	5
UK Singles (Official Charts)	6
UK Indie (Official Charts)	1

=== Year-end charts ===
Chart (2003)	Position
UK Singles (OCC)	103

== Release history ==
Region	Date	Format(s)	Label(s)	Ref.
United Kingdom	20 October 2003	CD; DVD	V2 Records	
Australia	1 December 2003	CD	V2 Records	
