= 2003 in British music charts =

This article gives details of the official charts from 2003.

Whilst weeks at number one began to increase with significant numbers achieving 4-week runs, single sales rapidly plummeted, decreasing by 34% since 2002. The year became the first in ten not to contain a million selling single. The year was particularly successful for Justin Timberlake, Busted, Avril Lavigne, Christina Aguilera, t.A.T.u. and Dido.

== Summary of UK chart activity ==
=== January ===
Remaining at the top from 2002, new girl band, Girls Aloud spent the first 2 weeks of the year at the top of the charts with their debut single "Sound of the Underground", and would consolidate their success with a platinum selling debut album and 3 more top 3 hits in this year. One talent show winner was replaced by another, in the form of David Sneddon a young performer from Scotland, who'd had lead roles in musicals and sung with bands around the pub circuit, including the Martians, and won BBC's Fame Academy performing Elton John's "Don't Let the Sun Go Down on Me" beating 36,000 other applicants. His debut single "Stop Living The Lie", entered the UK charts at No. 1 and remained there for 2 weeks. To date he is the only artist from a reality TV show to reach No. 1 with a self-written song. He had a further two top twenty hit singles and a top ten album, Seven Years Ten Weeks, and signed a development publishing deal with Universal Music in October 2003. In the singles chart that same week, British rock band Feeder gained only their second top 10 hit with "Just the Way I'm Feeling", one week and two years to the day "Buck Rogers" made #5. The chart success of the former saw its parent album Comfort in Sound become a regular chart fixture throughout the course of the year, before winning the Kerrang! Award for "Best British Band" (which Grant Nicholas dedicated to their late drummer Jon Lee) and later headlining many of the nation's largest arenas in December, after many years of playing small clubs, university campus halls and standard sized theatres.

After the release of her debut single, "Complicated", which made No. 3 in the singles charts, Avril Lavigne's début album, Let Go climbed to the top of the album charts for 3 weeks. Consequently, she became the youngest female solo artist to top the albums chart at only 17 years of age. The album spawned three other Top 40 hits, the upbeat "Sk8er Boi", the powerful "Losing Grip" and the loneliness ballad "I'm with You". None of these equalled the success of her début single, the highest peaking at #7.

=== February ===
Hitting the Russian charts 3 years earlier, female duo t.A.T.u. released their début single, "All the Things She Said" in the UK and it topped the charts for a total of 4 weeks, taking all of February with it. The accompanying video ostensibly depicted the girls imprisoned but concluded by revealing that it was the audience who was imprisoned; it stirred controversy with its images of the two girls kissing. They became the first Russian act to hit number 1 in the UK. Their album, 200 km/h in the Wrong Lane peaked at No. 12 in the charts and spawned a No. 7 hit, "Not Gonna Get Us" in May. London duo Turin Brakes scored their first UK top ten hit when "Pain Killer" entered the chart at No. 5 on 23 February. Previous to this, they had only enjoyed average success outside of the top 20.

After the massive success of his debut single as a solo artist, "Like I Love You" (#2), ex-*NSYNC member, Justin Timberlake released his solo album, Justified. Making No. 6 on its first chart run, it climbed back into the charts and this time made No. 1 for 2 weeks. Another solo star previously in a successful group took over from Justin. Previously in Destiny's Child, Kelly Rowland released her debut album, Simply Deep which topped the charts for one week. Her debut single "Stole", peaked at #2. Following their No. 1 album from 1999, alternative electronic band, Massive Attack hit the top again with their new album, 100th Window. The album spawned one single hit, "Special Cases" which made #15.

=== March ===
Returning to the top of the UK charts for the 4th time, US superstar, Christina Aguilera hit the top with a second release from her second album, Stripped. "Beautiful" contrasted with the upbeat and raunchy "Dirrty", as "Beautiful" was a love ballad that seemed to be very personal to Christina. She received praise from GLAAD because of the positive presentation of homosexual people in the video to the song, which was edited by the BBC for showing on Top of the Pops. Despite the fact that Britney has received 1 more chart topper than Christina, as of January 2005, Christina has spent more weeks on top of the UK charts than Britney, with "Beautiful" adding another 2 to that list. With the official comic relief song of the year, Gareth Gates returned to the top of the UK charts for a 4th and final time with a cover of Norman Greenbaum's "Spirit in the Sky". Taking it to the top for a 3rd time, Gareth became the only act to get to the top with this single who was not a one-hit wonder (however he performed the song with The Kumars who themselves were a one hit wonder). Ringo Starr released his album Ringo Rama on the 24th.

Returning to the top for a week was Justin Timberlake and his debut album, Justified. By this time, he had released a follow-up single to "Like I Love You" from the album. "Cry Me A River", also peaked at No. 2 and was an emotional ballad creating controversy because many thought the song was about Britney, seeing as there was a Britney look-alike in the video. Taking the top of the albums chart for the following 4 weeks was jazz singer, Norah Jones with her debut album, Come Away With Me. No singles were released from the album, but despite this it was a hugely successful album.

=== April ===
Becoming the second single of the year to have a 4-week run at number one, the next chart topper was a re-working of Oliver Cheatham's 1983 No. 38 hit, "Get Down Saturday Night". Featuring his vocals on the track, "Make Luv" was re-worked by Room 5 and was used in a TV advertisement for Lynx Deodorant. Consequently, it sold very well and topped the singles charts for almost the whole of April. The duo did another collaboration, "Music And You" in December as a Christmas release, but it only made #38.

Nu Metal band, Linkin Park hit No. 1 for the first time with their third album, Meteora. The album spawned 4 single hits, the highest peaking at #10. After a week, rock and roll duo, The White Stripes took over for 2 weeks with their fourth album, Elephant, spanning the very popular single, "7 Nation Army", which peaked at #7. Returning to the top of the charts with A Rush of Blood to the Head were Coldplay. This album was previously at No. 1 in September 2002. It only remained at the top for a week this time.

=== May ===
With their 3rd chart single, guitar playing pop trio, Busted scored their first UK chart topper when "You Said No" hit the top. This was their 3rd consecutive Top 3 hit, following their debut single, "That's What I Go To School For" which made No. 3 in September 2002 and their second single, "Year 3000" which hit No. 2 in January of this year. "You Said No" was a slightly more lyrics focused compared to their previous 2 singles which had been more tune based. Criticised for making a mockery of rock bands in the new millennium, Busted quickly gained a huge fanbase with young audiences. Taking over after 7 days was German producer, Thomas Bruckner, renamed Tomcraft for his one and only UK single, "Loneliness". It became the second of 9 to spend only a week at the top during the whole of 2003. This was a very good sign for the popularity of singles, however sales were at their all-time low. Back at the top for the first time in 6 years, was soul/RNB singer, R. Kelly with a track from his new album, Chocolate Factory. "Ignition Remix" was his first No. 1 single since "I Believe I Can Fly" hit the top in 1997. The single was successful, topping the charts for 4 weeks receiving hugely high levels of airplay across all radio stations. Other big hits included Lisa Maffia with her single All Over which managed to stay 3 weeks in the top 10 going on to sell over 90,000 copies.

With her 8th UK No. 1 album, Madonna returns to the top of the album charts with her new release American Life. The album contained the hits "Love Profusion", "Hollywood", "American Life" and "Die Another Day". The latter was taken from the soundtrack to the James Bond film of the same name, which itself was also a success. Returning to the top yet again was Justin Timberlake and his debut album, Justified, but its stay was only for a week. By this time it had spawned a 3rd No. 2 single, "Rock Your Body", which saw Justin turn towards dance music and show off his moves in the video. Despite the fact that Blur scored a 5th No. 1 album with their latest release, Think Tank, Justified was not kept from the top for long, returning to the top after a week, for what became its longest consecutive run at the top, ending at 3 weeks. In total, the album had spent 7 weeks at the top.

=== June ===
Alternative metal band Evanescence made their mark on the music industry with their début single "Bring Me To Life", which topped the charts for 4 weeks. The band, a four-piece from Little Rock, Arkansas, fronted by Amy Lee, went on to massive success with their début album, Fallen which topped the album chart for a week and spawned another 3 Top 10 hits during the year.

Topping the charts for the third time since their career began in 1997, the Stereophonics were back at the top with You Gotta Go There to Come Back. The album spawned 2 Top 5 hits, following the pattern from their previous 2 chart topping albums. Back at the top for the first time since 2001 were Radiohead with their 4th UK No. 1 album, Hail to the Thief. Only at the top for a week, just like the Stereophonics, Evanescence reached the top of the charts with Fallen while "Bring Me To Life" was still at the top of the singles chart.

=== July ===
Following in the footsteps of her former colleague, Kelly Rowland, Beyoncé Knowles managed to reach the top of the UK charts with a solo release. After making an appearance in the third Austin Powers movie, Austin Powers in Goldmember, Beyoncé put herself back in the public eye and then released her debut solo single from the movie, "Work It Out" which managed to make No. 7 on the UK singles chart. Her debut album, Dangerously in Love topped the charts a week before she received her first (third, including her career with Destiny's Child) number one single, and they both continued runs at the top simultaneously for 3 weeks when her second single was knocked off the top spot. "Crazy in Love" was an upbeat pop ballad, but was not as dance emphasised as "Work It Out". It featured the rapper Jay-Z who was already a very successful artist and whose career began 6 years ago in 1997.

Featuring her four Top 10 hits; the club tune "Work It Out", the chart topping "Crazy in Love", the No. 2 hit "'03 Bonnie & Clyde" also with Jay-Z and the massive US No. 1, "Baby Boy" in a duet with Sean Paul. Beyoncé's debut album, "Dangerously in Love" topped the charts for five consecutive weeks, three of those weeks coinciding with when her second single, "Crazy in Love" was at the top of the charts. Her debut album sold 113,000 copies in its first week and was eventually certified two times (2x) platinum in October by the BPI. The album itself have the most consecutive weeks to reach the top position on the UK album chart for 2003.

In 2004, Beyoncé released more singles from the album which fared well and then re-formed with her old girl group, Destiny's Child who proved to be much more successful than expected.

=== August ===
Hitting the top of the UK charts for the third time with his 5th single was Daniel Bedingfield with another love ballad, "Never Gonna Leave Your Side" which he said was a twin of his previous chart topper, "If You're Not The One", being about the same girl. Not only was the theme similar, but so was the chart performance, only spending a week at the summit. Urban/R&B singer Blu Cantrell was next to top the charts with a single from her second album, Bittersweet. The single was "Breathe" and was a collaboration with Sean Paul, who was a Jamaican born Reggae performer. Although never airing enough on Radio 1 to make the play list, it still managed to enter the chart at No. 1 and stay there for 4 weeks and became the surprise smash hit of the year.

With an original fusion of modern rock and country/folk, English rock band The Coral scored their 1st No. 1 album with their second release, Magic And Medicine. The album spawned 3 hit singles, one of which hit the top 5, becoming their highest peaking single ever. However, it only took a week before Robbie Williams hit the top of the charts again when Escapology returned to the top of the charts after its 6-week stay over the Christmas season of 2002. It contained the hits, "Feel", "Come Undone", "Something Beautiful" and "Sexed Up". Taking over after a week for a 2-week run was Eva Cassidy with her 3rd UK No. 1 album, American Tune. She became the second female solo artist to have 3 consecutive UK No. 1 albums, after Madonna achieved this in 2000, however it could be said that Eva holds this record solo, because one of Madonna's albums was the soundtrack to Evita which featured other vocalists as well as her, whereas Cassidy holds the full credit for all three of her albums. Even more amazingly, Cassidy's run of consecutive No. 1 albums started after her death, so the entire record is posthumous.

=== September ===
Hitting the top for only the 6th time since his massively successful career began in 1971, Elton John's No. 42 hit from 1979 "Are you ready for love" was shortened, put into use in by Sky TV for their football premiership ads and consequently re-released when it shot straight to the top of the charts for a week. It was only Elton's 3rd solo No. 1 single. Next was the second single and first Top 30 hit from The Black Eyed Peas. They are a 4-piece rap act from Los Angeles, California and scored a 6-week run at the top with this single, becoming the biggest selling single of the year (however, failing to sell a million copies, becoming the first year not to have a million selling single since 1993) and also the longest stay at the top of the UK charts since Cher's "Believe" in 1998. The song, "Where Is The Love?" featured an unaccredited Justin Timberlake's vocals on the chorus and was about society and the corruption that had engulfed it and that people should begin to spread love to bring the world to a better state.

Topping the charts for 4 weeks with their debut album were rock band, The Darkness. Modelling themselves on bands like Queen they had already scored one Top 40 hit from the album, with "Growing on Me", which peaked at #11. Their next hit from the album, in the following month was their biggest, peaking at No. 2 and becoming what was considered to be the first classic anthem of the 21st century. "I Believe in a Thing Called Love" was very Queen-esque and marked them as a hugely popular band. They made No. 2 again with their special Christmas release and the album, Permission to Land spawned one final hit the following year, "Love Is Only A Feeling", which hit #5. Following on from the split of S Club earlier in the year, Rachel Stevens made her solo debut in this month with "Sweet Dreams My LA Ex", peaking at No. 2 for two inconsecutive weeks and spending a further 3 in the top 10. She would enjoy two top 30 albums and a further 6 top 30 singles before taking time out from music to focus on an acting career in 2006.

=== October ===
Finally ending the long stint at the top from the Black Eyed Peas, the Sugababes were back for a 3rd time with their new single "Hole in the Head" taken from their 3rd album, Three which strangely enough peaked at No. 3 in the albums chart. This was their last No. 1 single until "Push the Button" hit the top spot in October 2005. They continued successfully into 2004, scoring 2 No. 8 hits, "In The Middle" & "Caught in a Moment".

Absolution was the 4th release from British rock band, Muse. Gradually acquiring a larger fan base, they finally scored a No. 1 album, with what has been by far their most successful to date. However, their run at the top was short-lived, because only after 7 days, Dido was back at the top with her second album, Life For Rent. Due to the success of No Angel when re-issued due to her appearance in Eminem's "Stan", she began recording again and this album became another massive hit, but not quite as big as her debut. The album spawned 3 hit singles, two of which failed to make the Top 20, but one became her most successful single, "White Flag", peaking at #2. It spent 4 weeks at the top, but was to return to the top several times over the course of the next few months.

=== November ===
New York hip hop producer, club DJ and radio DJ, Fatman Scoop combining with Crooklyn Clan were the first No. 1 November with "Be Faithful" which was made 5 years earlier, but only released now. It spent 2 weeks at No. 1 and became the second No. 1 of the year to hit the top many years after being made, with the first being t.A.T.u. and "All the Things She Said". The dance song "Slow" saw Kylie Minogue hit the top for a 7th time. She was praised all over for trying a different style and making it just as good as her other music, however it did join record with Iron Maiden's "Bring Your Daughter to the Slaughter" in becoming the lowest selling number one single of all time. Hitting the top for the second time were pop trio, Busted with their 5th chart hit, "Crashed The Wedding". Taking a different stance to their other singles, it still only managed one week at the summit. Hitting the top for a record 12th time were boyband Westlife with their remake of the Barry Manilow No. 11 hit from 1975, "Mandy". They were now 2 chart toppers ahead of the queen of pop, Madonna and 2 chart toppers behind the British Elvis, Cliff Richard.

With a collection of their best tracks such as "Everybody Hurts", "Imitation of Life", "Losing My Religion" & "The Great Beyond", R.E.M. were back at the top with In Time – The Best of R.E.M. – 1988–2003.

Failing to top the singles chart all year were boyband Blue who scored a 3rd consecutive UK No. 1 album with their new release Guilty. It had already spawned one hit, "Guilty", and would create more including "Signed, Sealed, Delivered I'm Yours" a collaboration with Stevie Wonder on one of his old tracks, "Breathe Easy" and "Bubblin'". They split at the end of 2004 releasing a Greatest Hits compilation promoting it with a new track "Curtain Falls". Returning to number one for the first time was Dido with Life For Rent. Taking over from her was Michael Jackson with his Number Ones collection. Scoring 7 #1's in the UK and 13 in the US, he had accumulated a large amount to make an album with. The album contained the likes of "Billie Jean", "Rock with You", "Don't Stop 'Til You Get Enough", "Black or White", "Earth Song" & "Thriller".

=== December ===
After a break of a year, Pop Idol Will Young returned to the top of the UK charts for the 4th time with his new single "Leave Right Now". It was taken from his new album, Friday's Child, which later topped the charts. He now had as many chart toppers as Gareth Gates and as of January 2005, they are still level. Taking over after 2 weeks was a duet from Ozzy Osbourne and his daughter Kelly with "Changes". Tipped to be the Christmas No. 1, Kelly was experiencing great success as a solo artist and also the song gave Ozzy his first No. 1 after 33 years of chart activity since he first started with Black Sabbath. It was also the first father/daughter chart topper since Frank Sinatra and Nancy Sinatra topped the charts with "Somethin' Stupid" in 1967. The Darkness' "Christmas Time (Don't Let The Bells End)" was also anticipated to take the top spot, however in the week leading up to Christmas, the most unexpected thing happened. Taken from the soundtrack to the film Donnie Darko, Michael Andrews & Gary Jules scored a chart topper with "Mad World". It was a remake of the "Tears for Fears" No. 3 hit from 1982 and topped the UK charts for 3 weeks becoming the fastest selling single of the year and took the Christmas number one spot along with it.

With their 5th album, Turnaround gave Westlife their 4th No. 1 album. It contained the chart topping "Mandy" and the No. 3 hit from the following year, "Obvious". The following year Brian McFadden split from the group, but they continued as a foursome releasing Allow Us To Be Frank with a cover of old big band classics. Topping the charts with his second album was Will Young and Friday's Child. which contained "Leave Right Now". However, the Christmas number one album was by one of the most successful female solo artists in the 21st century on the albums chart. Dido returned to the top for a further 3 weeks with Life For Rent. It has sold in excess of 2.2 million copies.

== Charts ==
=== Number-one singles ===
| Chart date (week ending) | Song | Artist(s) | Sales |
|---|---|---|---|
| 4 January | "Sound of the Underground" | Girls Aloud | 128,000 |
| 11 January | "Sound of the Underground" | Girls Aloud | 56,000 |
| 18 January | "Sound of the Underground" | Girls Aloud | 34,471 |
| 25 January | "Stop Living the Lie" | David Sneddon | 108,312 |
| 1 February | "Stop Living the Lie" | David Sneddon | 45,500 |
| 8 February | "All the Things She Said" | t.A.T.u. | 90,000 |
| 15 February | "All the Things She Said" | t.A.T.u. | 57,000 |
| 22 February | "All the Things She Said" | t.A.T.u. | 45,500 |
| 1 March | "All the Things She Said" | t.A.T.u. | 40,500 |
| 8 March | "Beautiful" | Christina Aguilera | 59,500 |
| 15 March | "Beautiful" | Christina Aguilera | 42,500 |
| 22 March | "Spirit in the Sky" | Gareth Gates and the Kumars | 273,508 |
| 29 March | "Spirit in the Sky" | Gareth Gates and the Kumars | 117,000 |
| 5 April | "Make Luv" | Room 5 featuring Oliver Cheatham | 111,000 |
| 12 April | "Make Luv" | Room 5 featuring Oliver Cheatham | 66,500 |
| 19 April | "Make Luv" | Room 5 featuring Oliver Cheatham | 43,000 |
| 26 April | "Make Luv" | Room 5 featuring Oliver Cheatham | 32,500 |
| 3 May | "You Said No" | Busted | 41,000 |
| 10 May | "Loneliness" | Tomcraft | 36,617 |
| 17 May | "Ignition (Remix)" | R. Kelly | 70,000 |
| 24 May | "Ignition (Remix)" | R. Kelly | 72,360 |
| 31 May | "Ignition (Remix)" | R. Kelly | 67,000 |
| 7 June | "Ignition (Remix)" | R. Kelly | 60,415 |
| 14 June | "Bring Me to Life" | Evanescence | 56,524 |
| 21 June | "Bring Me to Life" | Evanescence | 47,500 |
| 28 June | "Bring Me to Life" | Evanescence | 36,000 |
| 5 July | "Bring Me to Life" | Evanescence | 34,300 |
| 12 July | "Crazy in Love" | Beyoncé featuring Jay Z | 72,500 |
| 19 July | "Crazy in Love" | Beyoncé featuring Jay Z | 46,500 |
| 26 July | "Crazy in Love" | Beyoncé featuring Jay Z | 34,600 |
| 2 August | "Never Gonna Leave Your Side" | Daniel Bedingfield | 36,500 |
| 9 August | "Breathe" | Blu Cantrell featuring Sean Paul | 47,312 |
| 16 August | "Breathe" | Blu Cantrell featuring Sean Paul | 49,192 |
| 23 August | "Breathe" | Blu Cantrell featuring Sean Paul | 44,000 |
| 30 August | "Breathe" | Blu Cantrell featuring Sean Paul | 40,000 |
| 6 September | "Are You Ready for Love" | Elton John | 56,923 |
| 13 September | "Where Is the Love?" | The Black Eyed Peas | 94,308 |
| 20 September | "Where Is the Love?" | The Black Eyed Peas | 90,308 |
| 27 September | "Where Is the Love?" | The Black Eyed Peas | 79,000 |
| 4 October | "Where Is the Love?" | The Black Eyed Peas | 70,000 |
| 11 October | "Where Is the Love?" | The Black Eyed Peas | 65,000 |
| 18 October | "Where Is the Love?" | The Black Eyed Peas | 55,000 |
| 25 October | "Hole in the Head" | Sugababes | 58,500 |
| 1 November | "Be Faithful" | Fatman Scoop featuring The Crooklyn Clan | 62,500 |
| 8 November | "Be Faithful" | Fatman Scoop featuring The Crooklyn Clan | 51,400 |
| 15 November | "Slow" | Kylie Minogue | 43,291 |
| 22 November | "Crashed the Wedding" | Busted | 55,000 |
| 29 November | "Mandy" | Westlife | 70,000 |
| 6 December | "Leave Right Now" | Will Young | 117,702 |
| 13 December | "Leave Right Now" | Will Young | 83,000 |
| 20 December | "Changes" | Ozzy Osbourne & Kelly Osbourne | 86,000 |
| 27 December | "Mad World" | Michael Andrews featuring Gary Jules | 227,547 |

=== Number-one albums ===
| Chart date (week ending) | Album | Artist(s) | Sales |
|---|---|---|---|
| 4 January | Escapology | Robbie Williams | 226,000 |
| 11 January | Let Go | Avril Lavigne | 52,000 |
| 18 January | Let Go | Avril Lavigne | 38,000 |
| 25 January | Let Go | Avril Lavigne | 41,000 |
| 1 February | Justified | Justin Timberlake | 34,000 |
| 8 February | Justified | Justin Timberlake | 51,000 |
| 15 February | Simply Deep | Kelly Rowland | 63,000 |
| 22 February | 100th Window | Massive Attack | 65,500 |
| 1 March | Justified | Justin Timberlake | 56,000 |
| 8 March | Come Away with Me | Norah Jones | 71,000 |
| 15 March | Come Away with Me | Norah Jones | 67,500 |
| 22 March | Come Away with Me | Norah Jones | 60,000 |
| 29 March | Come Away with Me | Norah Jones | 53,000 |
| 5 April | Meteora | Linkin Park | 93,886 |
| 12 April | Elephant | The White Stripes | 64,191 |
| 19 April | Elephant | The White Stripes | 40,000 |
| 26 April | A Rush of Blood to the Head | Coldplay | 39,000 |
| 3 May | American Life | Madonna | 65,000 |
| 10 May | Justified | Justin Timberlake | 48,000 |
| 17 May | Think Tank | Blur | 64,803 |
| 24 May | Justified | Justin Timberlake | 43,000 |
| 31 May | Justified | Justin Timberlake | 48,000 |
| 7 June | Justified | Justin Timberlake | 41,000 |
| 14 June | You Gotta Go There to Come Back | Stereophonics | 101,946 |
| 21 June | Hail to the Thief | Radiohead | 114,320 |
| 28 June | Fallen | Evanescence | 38,570 |
| 5 July | Dangerously in Love | Beyoncé | 113,117 |
| 12 July | Dangerously in Love | Beyoncé | 86,500 |
| 19 July | Dangerously in Love | Beyoncé | 72,000 |
| 26 July | Dangerously in Love | Beyoncé | 49,000 |
| 2 August | Dangerously in Love | Beyoncé | 45,000 |
| 9 August | Magic and Medicine | The Coral | 62,792 |
| 16 August | Escapology | Robbie Williams | 37,000 |
| 23 August | American Tune | Eva Cassidy | 42,500 |
| 30 August | American Tune | Eva Cassidy | 49,000 |
| 6 September | Permission to Land | The Darkness | 43,500 |
| 13 September | Permission to Land | The Darkness | 48,600 |
| 20 September | Permission to Land | The Darkness | 60,500 |
| 27 September | Permission to Land | The Darkness | 64,000 |
| 4 October | Absolution | Muse | 71,597 |
| 11 October | Life for Rent | Dido | 400,351 |
| 18 October | Life for Rent | Dido | 198,714 |
| 25 October | Life for Rent | Dido | 122,500 |
| 1 November | Life for Rent | Dido | 89,500 |
| 8 November | In Time - The Best of R.E.M. 1988-2003 | R.E.M. | 114,000 |
| 15 November | Guilty | Blue | 89,000 |
| 22 November | Life for Rent | Dido | 83,604 |
| 29 November | Number Ones | Michael Jackson | 118,157 |
| 6 December | Turnaround | Westlife | 154,169 |
| 13 December | Friday's Child | Will Young | 201,900 |
| 20 December | Life for Rent | Dido | 216,900 |
| 27 December | Life for Rent | Dido | 270,652 |

=== Number-one compilation albums ===
| Chart date (week ending) | Album |
|---|---|
| 4 January | Now 53 |
| 11 January | Now 53 |
| 18 January | Clubbers Guide 2003 |
| 25 January | 8 Mile: Music from and Inspired by the Motion Picture |
| 1 February | 8 Mile: Music from and Inspired by the Motion Picture |
| 8 February | 8 Mile: Music from and Inspired by the Motion Picture |
| 15 February | Love Eternal Lovesongs |
| 22 February | Love Eternal Lovesongs |
| 1 March | Club Mix 2003 |
| 8 March | The Very Best of Unplugged 2 |
| 15 March | The Very Best of Unplugged 2 |
| 22 March | The Very Best of Cold Feet |
| 29 March | The Very Best of Cold Feet |
| 5 April | The Very Best of Cold Feet |
| 12 April | Hits 55 |
| 19 April | Hits 55 |
| 26 April | Now 54 |
| 3 May | Now 54 |
| 10 May | Now 54 |
| 17 May | Now 54 |
| 24 May | Now 54 |
| 31 May | Now 54 |
| 7 June | Now 54 |
| 14 June | Power Ballads |
| 21 June | Power Ballads |
| 28 June | Power Ballads |
| 5 July | Clubland III |
| 12 July | Clubland III |
| 19 July | Clubland III |
| 26 July | Hits 56 |
| 2 August | Now 55 |
| 9 August | Now 55 |
| 16 August | Now 55 |
| 23 August | Now 55 |
| 30 August | Now 55 |
| 6 September | Kiss Presents R&B Collaborations |
| 13 September | Kiss Presents R&B Collaborations |
| 20 September | Kiss Presents R&B Collaborations |
| 27 September | Clubmix Summer 2003 |
| 4 October | Clubmix Summer 2003 |
| 11 October | Now Decades |
| 18 October | Now Decades |
| 25 October | Now Decades |
| 1 November | Greasemania |
| 8 November | Now Dance 2004 |
| 15 November | Westwood: Platinum Edition |
| 22 November | Clubland 4 |
| 29 November | Now 56 |
| 6 December | Now 56 |
| 13 December | Now 56 |
| 20 December | Now 56 |
| 27 December | Now 56 |

== Year-end charts ==
Between 29 December 2002 and 27 December 2003.

=== Best-selling singles ===
| No. | Title | Artist | Peak position | Sales |
|---|---|---|---|---|
| 1 | "Where Is the Love?" | The Black Eyed Peas | 1 | 625,198 |
| 2 | "Spirit in the Sky" | Gareth Gates with the Kumars | 1 | 552,598 |
| 3 | "Ignition (Remix)" | R. Kelly | 1 | 478,369 |
| 4 | "Mad World" | Michael Andrews featuring Gary Jules | 1 | 394,627 |
| 5 | "Leave Right Now" | Will Young | 1 | 381,088 |
| 6 | "All the Things She Said" | t.A.T.u. | 1 | 337,829 |
| 7 | "Changes" | Ozzy Osbourne and Kelly Osbourne | 1 | 333,869 |
| 8 | "Breathe" | Blu Cantrell featuring Sean Paul | 1 | 330,032 |
| 9 | "Make Luv" | Room 5 featuring Oliver Cheatham | 1 | 316,750 |
| 10 | "Christmas Time (Don't Let the Bells End)" | The Darkness | 2 | 313,530 |
| 11 | "Bring Me to Life" | Evanescence | 1 | |
| 12 | "White Flag" | Dido | 2 | |
| 13 | "In da Club" | 50 Cent | 3 | |
| 14 | "Turn Me On" | Kevin Lyttle | 2 | |
| 15 | "Crazy in Love" | Beyoncé featuring Jay-Z | 1 | |
| 16 | "Move Your Feet" | Junior Senior | 3 | |
| 17 | "I'm Your Man" | Shane Richie | 2 | |
| 18 | "Stop Living the Lie" | David Sneddon | 1 | |
| 19 | "Be Faithful" | Fatman Scoop featuring The Crooklyn Clan | 1 | |
| 20 | "Shut Up" | The Black Eyed Peas | 2 | |
| 21 | "Sound of the Underground" | Girls Aloud | 1 | |
| 22 | "Sweet Dreams My LA Ex" | Rachel Stevens | 2 | |
| 23 | "Beautiful" | Christina Aguilera | 1 | |
| 24 | "Pretty Green Eyes" | Ultrabeat | 2 | |
| 25 | "Lose Yourself" | Eminem | 3 (Note: Reached number 1 in 2002) | |
| 26 | "Superstar" | Jamelia | 3 | |
| 27 | "Are You Ready for Love?" | Elton John | 1 | |
| 28 | "Cry Me a River" | Justin Timberlake | 2 | |
| 29 | "All I Have" | Jennifer Lopez featuring LL Cool J | 2 | |
| 30 | "Stole" | Kelly Rowland | 2 | |
| 31 | "Mandy" | Westlife | 1 | |
| 32 | "Fly on the Wings of Love" | XTM & DJ Chucky presents Annia | 8 | |
| 33 | "I Believe in a Thing Called Love" | The Darkness | 2 | |
| 34 | "Year 3000" | Busted | 2 | |
| 35 | "If You're Not the One" | Daniel Bedingfield | 4 (Note: Reached number 1 in 2002) | |
| 36 | "Proper Crimbo" | Bo Selecta | 4 | |
| 37 | "The Fast Food Song" | Fast Food Rockers | 2 | |
| 38 | "I Know What You Want" | Busta Rhymes and Mariah Carey featuring Flipmode Squad | 3 | |
| 39 | "Baby Boy" | Big Brovaz | 4 | |
| 40 | "Scandalous" | Mis-Teeq | 2 | |
| 41 | "Born to Try" | Delta Goodrem | 3 | |
| 42 | "Jump" | Girls Aloud | 2 | |
| 43 | "Hole in the Head" | Sugababes | 1 | |
| 44 | "Never Leave You (Uh Oooh, Uh Oooh)" | Lumidee | 2 | |
| 45 | "Favourite Things" | Big Brovaz | 2 | |
| 46 | "Loneliness" | Tomcraft | 1 | |
| 47 | "The Boys of Summer" | DJ Sammy featuring Loona | 2 | |
| 48 | "Crashed the Wedding" | Busted | 1 | |
| 49 | "No Letting Go" | Wayne Wonder | 3 | |
| 50 | "'03 Bonnie & Clyde" | Jay-Z featuring Beyoncé | 2 | |

=== Best-selling albums ===
| No. | Title | Artist | Peak position | Sales |
|---|---|---|---|---|
| 1 | Life for Rent | Dido | 1 | 2,168,302 |
| 2 | Justified | Justin Timberlake | 1 | 1,404,272 |
| 3 | Stripped | Christina Aguilera | 2 | 1,264,059 |
| 4 | Gotta Get Thru This | Daniel Bedingfield | 2 | 1,112,143 |
| 5 | Come Away with Me | Norah Jones | 1 | 1,071,671 |
| 6 | Permission to Land | The Darkness | 1 | 1,027,803 |
| 7 | A Rush of Blood to the Head | Coldplay | 1 | 985,587 |
| 8 | Number Ones | Michael Jackson | 1 | 960,848 |
| 9 | Busted | Busted | 2 | 907,331 |
| 10 | In Time: The Best of R.E.M. 1988–2003 | R.E.M. | 1 | 907,282 |
| 11 | Let Go | Avril Lavigne | 1 | |
| 12 | Friday's Child | Will Young | 1 | |
| 13 | Elephunk | The Black Eyed Peas | 4 | |
| 14 | Dangerously in Love | Beyoncé | 1 | |
| 15 | Fallen | Evanescence | 1 | 775,000 |
| 16 | Innocent Eyes | Delta Goodrem | 2 | |
| 17 | Get Rich or Die Tryin' | 50 Cent | 2 | |
| 18 | By the Way | Red Hot Chili Peppers | 1 | 707,974 |
| 19 | A Present for Everyone | Busted | 2 | 684,000 |
| 20 | Greatest Hits | Red Hot Chili Peppers | 4 | 637,271 |
| 21 | Dutty Rock | Sean Paul | 2 | |
| 22 | Elephant | The White Stripes | 1 | |
| 23 | Turnaround | Westlife | 1 | |
| 24 | Pure | Hayley Westenra | 7 | 578,749 |
| 25 | The R. in R&B Collection, Vol. 1 | R. Kelly | 4 | |
| 26 | Home | Simply Red | 2 | |
| 27 | Escapology | Robbie Williams | 1 | |
| 28 | You Gotta Go There to Come Back | Stereophonics | 1 | |
| 29 | Guilty | Blue | 1 | |
| 30 | Live at Knebworth | Robbie Williams | 2 | |
| 31 | Three | Sugababes | 3 | |
| 32 | The Very Best of Sheryl Crow | Sheryl Crow | 2 | |
| 33 | Greatest Hits 1970–2002 | Elton John | 3 | |
| 34 | As Time Goes By: The Great American Songbook, Volume II | Rod Stewart | 4 | |
| 35 | Meteora | Linkin Park | 1 | |
| 36 | Michael Buble | Michael Bublé | 6 | |
| 37 | Bryn | Bryn Terfel | 6 | |
| 38 | Twentysomething | Jamie Cullum | 5 | |
| 39 | The Eminem Show | Eminem | 1 | |
| 40 | Ladies Night | Atomic Kitten | 5 | 519,871 |
| 41 | Simply Deep | Kelly Rowland | 1 | |
| 42 | Nu-Flow | Big Brovaz | 6 | |
| 43 | Introduction | Alex Parks | 5 | |
| 44 | Missundaztood | Pink | 2 | |
| 45 | A New Day at Midnight | David Gray | 1 | |
| 46 | So Much for the City | The Thrills | 3 | |
| 47 | The Young and the Hopeless | Good Charlotte | 15 | |
| 48 | Up! | Shania Twain | 4 | |
| 49 | Greatest Hits | Tom Jones | 2 | |
| 50 | Cliff at Christmas | Cliff Richard | 9 | |

=== Best-selling compilations ===
| No. | Title | Peak position |
|---|---|---|
| 1 | Now 56 | 1 |
| 2 | Power Ballads: The Greatest Driving Anthems in the World... Ever! | 1 |
| 3 | Now 55 | 1 |
| 4 | Pop Party | 2 |
| 5 | Now 54 | 1 |
| 6 | Love Actually (Original Soundtrack) | 2 |
| 7 | Now Decades | 1 |
| 8 | The Number One Classical Album 2004 | 4 |
| 9 | 8 Mile (Original Soundtrack) | 1 |
| 10 | Clubland III: The Sound of the Summer | 1 |

== See also ==
- List of UK Dance Singles Chart number ones of 2003
- List of UK Independent Singles Chart number ones of 2003
- List of UK Rock & Metal Singles Chart number ones of 2003
