= Husan (song) =

2003 single by Bhangra Knights vs. Husan

Single by Bhangra Knights vs. Husan
- Released: 5 May 2003
- Genre: Bhangra
- Length: 2:43 (radio edit)
- Label: Positiva, Tinted
- Songwriters: Jeroen Den Hengst, Niels Zuiderhoek
- Producers: Jeroen Den Hengst, Niels Zuiderhoek

"Husan" is a bhangra song produced by British duo Bhangra Knights, which consisted of Jules Spinner and Jack Berry, and Dutch duo Husan, which consisted of Niels Zuiderhoek and Jeroen Den Hengst. The song samples Indian singer Raja Mustaq. Additional music editing was done by Dutch producer Coen Berrier, former collaborator with Mason, and the lyric editor was Nasir Nizami. The original version of the single was produced by Husan for a Peugeot 206 car advertisement and was credited under the name "Bald N Spikey".

The song became widely known in the United Kingdom as it sampled "Heaven is a Place on Earth" by Raja Mushtaq, which was used in commercials for the Peugeot 206 car. The single version is a remix by Bhangra Knights. Released on 5 May 2003, "Husan" charted at number seven on the UK Singles Chart while becoming a moderate hit in the rest of Europe, reaching the top 40 in Austria, Hungary, Ireland. the Netherlands, and Wallonia. It also reached the top 40 in Australia and New Zealand.

== Track listings ==
UK CD single

1. "Husan" (radio edit) – 2:43
2. "Husan" (extended mix) – 6:32
3. "Husan" (Husan's original mix) – 3:05
4. "Husan" (The Bobby Friction & Infinite Scale mix) – 5:15
5. "Husan" (enhanced video)

UK 12-inch single

A1. "Husan" (extended mix) – 6:32
B1. "Husan" (Husan's original mix) – 3:05
B2. "Husan" (The Bobby Friction & Infinite Scale mix) – 4:58

UK cassette single

1. "Husan" (radio edit) – 2:43
2. "Husan" (extended mix) – 6:32
3. "Husan" (Husan's original mix) – 3:05
4. "Husan" (The Bobby Friction & Infinite Scale mix) – 5:15

European CD single

1. "Husan" (radio edit) – 2:43
2. "Husan" (original mix) – 3:05

Australian and New Zealand CD single

1. "Husan" (Bhangra Knights vs. Husan radio edit) – 2:44
2. "Husan" (Husan's original mix) – 3:06
3. "Husan" (Bhangra Knights vs. Husan extended mix) – 6:34
4. "Husan" (Bhangra Knights vs. Husan dub version) – 6:26
5. "Husan" (Husan's Tantra Step mix) – 3:06
6. "Husan" (B. F. & I. Scale mix) – 5:19
7. "Husan" (video, Puegot bonus ad)

== Charts ==
=== Weekly charts ===
| Chart (2003) | Peak position |
|---|---|
| Australia (ARIA) | 38 |
| Austria (Ö3 Austria Top 40) | 29 |
| Belgium (Ultratop 50 Flanders) | 41 |
| Belgium (Ultratop 50 Wallonia) | 36 |
| Europe (Eurochart Hot 100) | 23 |
| France (SNEP) | 48 |
| Germany (GfK) | 85 |
| Greece (IFPI Greece) | 10 |
| Hungary (Dance Top 40) | 34 |
| Hungary (Rádiós Top 40) | 26 |
| Ireland (IRMA) | 23 |
| Ireland Dance (IRMA) | 3 |
| Netherlands (Dutch Top 40) | 23 |
| Netherlands (Single Top 100) | 28 |
| New Zealand (Recorded Music NZ) | 37 |
| Romania (Romanian Top 100) | 27 |
| Scottish Singles Sales (Official Charts) | 6 |
| Switzerland (Schweizer Hitparade) | 73 |
| UK Singles (Official Charts) | 7 |
| UK Dance (Official Charts) | 3 |

| Chart (2024) | Peak position |
|---|---|
| Kazakhstan Airplay (TopHit) | 83 |

=== Year-end charts ===
| Chart (2003) | Position |
|---|---|
| UK Singles (OCC) | 124 |

== Release history ==
| Region | Date | Format(s) | Label(s) | Ref. |
|---|---|---|---|---|
| United Kingdom | 5 May 2003 | 12-inch vinyl; CD; cassette | Positiva | |
| Australia | 14 July 2003 | CD | Tinted | |
