= Be Faithful =

1999 single by Fatman Scoop

Single by Fatman Scoop featuring the Crooklyn Clan
- Released: March 1999
- Length: 3:35; 2:45 (2003 dirty version); 2:42 (2003 clean version)
- Label: AV8
- Songwriters: Isaac Freeman; Edmund Bini; Joseph Rizzo; Sean Combs; Schon Crawford; Clarence Emery; Bernard Edwards; Faith Evans; Ronald Lawrence; Nile Rodgers; James Alexander; Ben Cauley; Johnny Hammond; Allen Jones; William McLean; Andres Titus
- Producers: DJ Sizzahandz; DJ Riz; Fatman Scoop; Crooklyn Clan

Fatman Scoop singles chronology
"Where U @?" (1998)	"Be Faithful" (1999, 2003)	"Drop" (2001)

The Crooklyn Clan singles chronology
"Where U @?" (1998)	"Be Faithful" (1999, 2003)	"It Takes Scoop" (2004)

"Be Faithful" is a song performed by American hip hop artist Fatman Scoop, featuring and produced by American hip hop duo the Crooklyn Clan. The song was released in March 1999, becoming a minor hit in the United States. A second release in October 2003 gained the song wider international success, topping the charts of the United Kingdom and Ireland and peaking within the top 10 in Australia and Denmark. The song was featured in the trailer for the film The Best Man and later in the 2001 film Save the Last Dance.

== Background ==
The song heavily samples "Love Like This" by Faith Evans, which in turn is made of a covered loop from Chic's "Chic Cheer". It also samples "Party Ain't a Party" by Queen Pen, "Off the Books" by the Beatnuts, "Can I Get A..." by Jay-Z, "Hip Hop Hooray" by Naughty by Nature and "The Choice Is Yours (Revisited)" by Black Sheep.

== Music video ==
The video, wherein most characters have oversized heads, no bodies (except for the main woman who is depicted in her underwear), and free-floating hands & feet, sees Scoop driving, walking, and singing throughout New York City. Scoop climbs a building carrying a woman with police officers flying planes in pursuit, a nod to King Kong.

== Legacy ==
Nearly 20 years after its release, the song re-gained attention in 2018 after Australian Prime Minister Scott Morrison posted a tweet, containing footage of Parliament set to an excerpt of the song. It was criticised for its inappropriate lyrics and potential breach of laws on the use of Parliamentary footage.

After Fatman Scoop died on August 30, 2024, the song acquired more attention. The single debuted at number 49 on the UK Singles Downloads Chart.

== Track listings ==
US 12-inch single (1999) and Australian CD single (2000)

1. "Be Faithful" (clean)
2. "Be Faithful" (dirty)

UK and Australasian CD single (2003)

1. "Be Faithful" (dirty version) – 2:45
2. "Be Faithful" (Highpass vocal remix) – 5:45
3. "Be Faithful" (Highpass FM remix) – 3:16
4. "Be Faithful" (video CD-ROM)

UK 12-inch single (2003)

A1. "Be Faithful" (dirty version) – 2:45
A2. "Be Faithful" (Highpass FM remix) – 3:16
B1. "Be Faithful" (Highpass vocal remix) – 5:45

UK cassette single (2003)

1. "Be Faithful" (dirty version) – 2:45
2. "Be Faithful" (Highpass vocal remix) – 5:45
3. "Be Faithful" (Highpass FM remix) – 3:16

European CD single (2003)

1. "Be Faithful" (dirty version) – 2:45
2. "Be Faithful" (Highpass vocal remix) – 5:45

Italian 12-inch single (2003)

A1. "Be Faithful" (dirty version) – 2:45
A2. "Be Faithful" (Highpass vocal remix) – 5:26
B1. "Be Faithful" (Highpass dub remix) – 5:30
B2. "Be Faithful" (clean version) – 2:42

== Charts ==
=== Weekly charts ===
1999 weekly chart performance for "Be Faithful"
Chart (1999)	Peak position
US Hot R&B/Hip-Hop Songs (Billboard)	92
US Hot Rap Songs (Billboard)	24

2003–2004 weekly chart performance for "Be Faithful"
Chart (2003–2004)	Peak position
Australia (ARIA)	5
Australian Urban (ARIA)	3
Austria (Ö3 Austria Top 40)	46
Belgium (Ultratop 50 Flanders)	11
Belgium (Ultratop 50 Wallonia)	12
Denmark (Tracklisten)	4
Europe (Eurochart Hot 100)	6
France (SNEP)	13
Germany (GfK)	28
Hungary (Dance Top 40)	25
Ireland (IRMA)	1
Italy (FIMI)	24
Netherlands (Dutch Top 40)	15
Netherlands (Single Top 100)	30
Romania (Romanian Top 100)	74
Scottish Singles Sales (Official Charts)	1
Switzerland (Schweizer Hitparade)	15
UK Singles (Official Charts)	1
UK Hip Hop/R&B (Official Charts)	1

2024 weekly chart performance for "Be Faithful"
Chart (2024)	Peak position
UK Singles Downloads	49

=== Year-end charts ===
2003 year-end chart performance for "Be Faithful"
Chart (2003)	Position
Ireland (IRMA)	24
UK Singles (OCC)	19

2004 year-end chart performance for "Be Faithful"
Chart (2004)	Position
Australia (ARIA)	45
Switzerland (Schweizer Hitparade)	77

== Certifications ==
Certifications for "Be Faithful"
Region	Certification	Certified units/sales
Australia (ARIA)	Platinum	70,000^{^}
United Kingdom (BPI)	Gold	400,000^{‡}
^{^} Shipments figures based on certification alone.^{‡} Sales+streaming figures based on certification alone.

== Release history ==
Release history and formats for "Be Faithful"
Region	Date	Format(s)	Label(s)	Ref.
United States	March 1999	12-inch vinyl	AV8	
Australia	August 21, 2000	CD	Pro DJ International	
Australia	October 9, 2000	CD	Mezzanine Music	
United Kingdom	October 20, 2003	12-inch vinyl; CD; cassette	Def Jam; AV8; Illicit; Motivo Productions; Mercury	
Australia	November 24, 2003	CD	Def Jam; AV8; Illicit; Motivo Productions; Mercury	
