= The Streets discography =

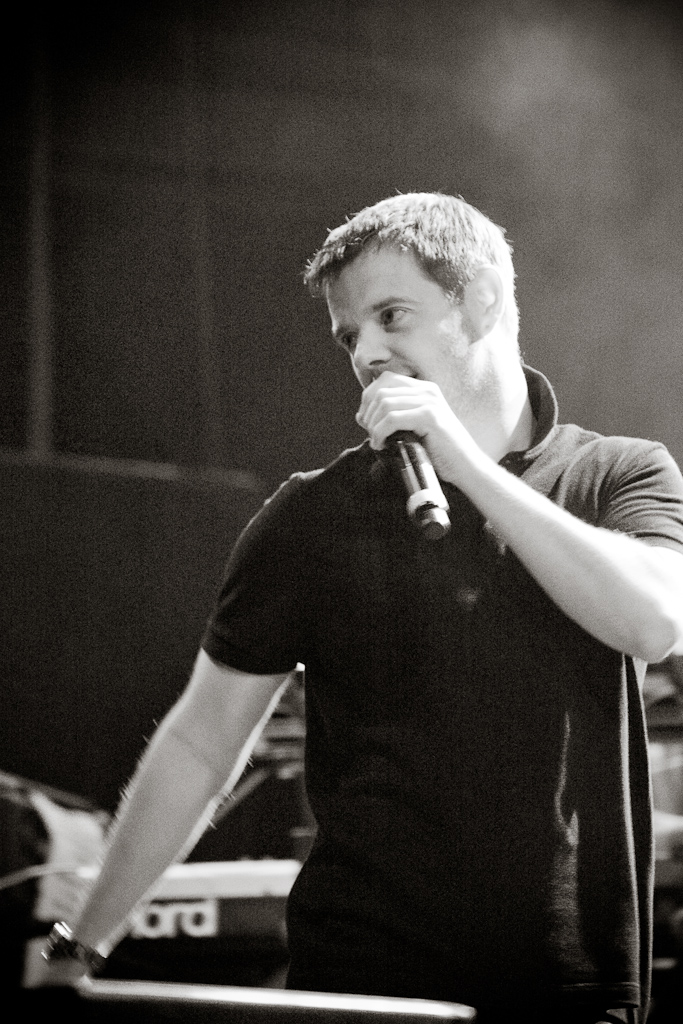
- Studio albums: 6
- Extended plays: 1
- Singles: 35
- Mixtapes: 3

This is a comprehensive listing of official releases by the British music act the Streets. The Streets released six studio albums, three mixtapes, one EP and thirty-five singles.

The first studio album, Original Pirate Material, was released in the United Kingdom on 25 March 2002, and reached number 10 on the UK Albums Chart, managing to be certified as platinum in March 2003. The second album, A Grand Don't Come for Free, was released in 2004, peaking at number 1 and certified thrice platinum in the UK. The third studio album, The Hardest Way to Make an Easy Living, was released on 10 April 2006, becoming the Streets' second consecutive album to reach number one and certified as gold several weeks after release. On 15 September 2008, the fourth studio album, Everything Is Borrowed, was released in the UK, becoming the fourth consecutive top 10 album, peaking at number 7 and certified silver two weeks after release. In 2011, he released two studio albums, Cyberspace and Reds, billed as a mixtape and released through his website, and the proper follow-up, Computers and Blues.

== Studio albums ==
List of studio albums, with selected chart positions and certifications
Title	Details	Peak chart positions										Certifications
Title	Details	UK	AUS	BEL	FRA	GER	IRE	NOR	NZ	SWI	US	Certifications
Original Pirate Material	Released: 25 March 2002; Label: Locked On, 679; Formats: CD, LP, digital download	10	57	172	97	93	6	10	36	—	—	BPI: 2× Platinum; ARIA: Gold
A Grand Don't Come for Free	Released: 18 May 2004; Label: Locked On, 679; Formats: CD, LP, digital download	1	11	22	38	25	1	5	7	34	82	BPI: 4× Platinum; ARIA: Gold; RMNZ: Gold
The Hardest Way to Make an Easy Living	Released: 10 April 2006; Label: Locked On; Formats: CD, digital download	1	16	19	122	25	3	10	21	19	68	BPI: Gold; IRMA: Gold
Everything Is Borrowed	Released: 15 September 2008; Label: 679, Vice; Formats: CD, digital download	7	55	28	99	58	19	—	—	19	154	BPI: Gold
Computers and Blues	Released: 7 February 2011; Label: 679, Atlantic; Formats: CD, digital download	8	49	59	138	45	22	37	32	18	—	
The Darker the Shadow the Brighter the Light	Released: 13 October 2023; Label: 679, Warner Music UK; Formats: CD, LP, digital download, streaming	7	—	—	—	57	—	—	—	—	—	
"—" denotes a recording that did not chart or was not released in that territory.

== Mixtapes ==
Title	Details	Peak chart positions				
Title	Details	UK	BEL	GER	IRE	SWI
Cyberspace and Reds	Released: 24 January 2011 (Note: Cyberspace and Reds was released as a free download.); Label: Self-released; Formats: Digital download	—	—	—	—	—
None of Us Are Getting Out of This Life Alive	Released: 10 July 2020; Label: Island Records; Formats: CD, LP, cassette, digital download, streaming	2	179	30	35	22
Fabric Presents The Streets	Released: 28 June 2024; Label: Island Records, Fabric Records; Formats: CD, LP digital download, streaming	—	—	—	—	—
"—" denotes a recording that did not chart or was not released in that territory.

== Extended plays ==
Title	Details
All Got Our Runnins	Released: 2003; Label: Vice Records; Formats: CD, digital download
Brexit at Tiffany's	Released: 11 August 2022; Label: Island Records; Formats: Digital download

== Singles ==
=== As lead artist ===
Title	Year	Peak chart positions										Certifications	Album
Title	Year	UK	AUS	AUT	DEN	GER	IRE	NL	NZ	SWE	SWI	Certifications	Album
"Has It Come to This?"	2001	18	—	—	—	—	—	—	—	—	—	BPI: Gold	Original Pirate Material
"Let's Push Things Forward" (featuring Kevin Mark Trail)	2002	30	—	—	—	—	—	98	—	—	—		Original Pirate Material
"Weak Become Heroes"	2002	27	74	—	—	—	—	—	—	—	—		Original Pirate Material
"Don't Mug Yourself"	2002	21	—	—	—	—	—	—	—	—	—	BPI: Silver	Original Pirate Material
"Fit but You Know It"	2004	4	37	—	—	85	11	—	—	42	—	BPI: Platinum	A Grand Don't Come for Free
"Dry Your Eyes"	2004	1	42	5	—	53	1	11	15	24	—	BPI: Platinum	A Grand Don't Come for Free
"Blinded by the Lights"	2004	10	92	—	—	63	16	—	—	—	—	BPI: Platinum	A Grand Don't Come for Free
"Could Well Be In"	2004	30	—	—	—	—	35	—	—	—	—		A Grand Don't Come for Free
"When You Wasn't Famous"	2006	8	67	74	—	—	26	—	—	60	—		The Hardest Way to Make an Easy Living
"Never Went to Church"	2006	20	—	—	—	—	27	—	—	—	—		The Hardest Way to Make an Easy Living
"Prangin' Out" (featuring Pete Doherty)	2006	25	—	—	—	—	—	—	—	—	—		The Hardest Way to Make an Easy Living
"The Escapist"	2008	157	—	—	—	—	—	—	—	—	—		Everything Is Borrowed
"Everything Is Borrowed"	2008	37	—	—	29	—	—	—	—	—	87		Everything Is Borrowed
"Heaven for the Weather"	2008	145	—	—	—	—	—	—	—	—	—		Everything Is Borrowed
"Going Through Hell"	2011	158	—	—	—	—	—	—	—	—	—		Computers and Blues
"OMG"	2011	—	—	—	—	—	—	—	—	—	—		Computers and Blues
"Burn Bridges"	2017	—	—	—	—	—	—	—	—	—	—		Non-album singles
"If You Ever Need to Talk I'm Here"	2018	—	—	—	—	—	—	—	—	—	—		Non-album singles
"Boys Will Be Boys" (featuring Jaykae)	2018	—	—	—	—	—	—	—	—	—	—		Non-album singles
"You Are Not the Voice in Your Head"	2018	—	—	—	—	—	—	—	—	—	—		Non-album singles
"Call Me in the Morning" (featuring Grim Sickers and Chip)	2018	—	—	—	—	—	—	—	—	—	—		Non-album singles
"How Long's It Been" (with Flohio)	2019	—	—	—	—	—	—	—	—	—	—		Non-album singles
"Take Me as I Am" (with Chris Lorenzo)	2019	— (Note: "Take Me as I Am" did not enter the UK Top 100 but debuted and peaked at number 7 on the UK Independent Singles Breakers Chart.)	—	—	—	—	—	—	—	—	—	BPI: Silver	None of Us Are Getting Out of This Life Alive
"Call My Phone Thinking I'm Doing Nothing Better" (with Tame Impala)	2020	—	—	—	—	—	—	—	—	—	—		None of Us Are Getting Out of This Life Alive
"Where the F*$K Did April Go"	2020	—	—	—	—	—	—	—	—	—	—		Non-album single
"I Wish You Loved You as Much as You Love Him" (featuring Donae'o & Greentea Peng)	2020	—	—	—	—	—	—	—	—	—	—		None of Us Are Getting Out of This Life Alive
"Falling Down" (featuring Hak Baker)	2020	—	—	—	—	—	—	—	—	—	—		None of Us Are Getting Out of This Life Alive
"Difficult Times Freestyle"	2020	—	—	—	—	—	—	—	—	—	—		Non-album singles
"Who's Got the Bag (21st June)"	2021	— (Note: "Who's Got the Bag (21st June" did not enter the UK Top 100 but debuted and peaked at number 78 on the UK Singles Downloads Chart and number 79 on the UK Singles Sales Chart.)	—	—	—	—	—	—	—	—	—		Non-album singles
"Wrong Answers Only" (featuring Master Peace)	2022	—	—	—	—	—	—	—	—	—	—		Non-album singles
"Mike (Desert Island Duvet)" (with Fred Again and Dermot Kennedy)	2023	78	—	—	—	—	44	—	— (Note: "Mike (Desert Island Duvet)" did not enter the NZ Top 40 Singles Chart, but peaked at number 11 on the NZ Hot 40 Singles Chart.)	—	—		Fabric Presents The Streets
"Troubled Waters"	2023	—	—	—	—	—	—	—	—	—	—		The Darker the Shadow, the Brighter the Light
"Too Much Yayo"	2023	—	—	—	—	—	—	—	—	—	—		The Darker the Shadow, the Brighter the Light
"Turn the Page" (with Overmono)	2024	—	—	—	—	—	—	—	—	—	—		Non-album single
"No Better Than Chance"	2024	—	—	—	—	—	—	—	—	—	—		Fabric Presents The Streets
"End Of The Queue"		—	—	—	—	—	—	—	—	—	—		
''Different Kind of Trap'' (with nineteen97)	2024	—	—	—	—	—	—	—	—	—	—		Non-album single
''How to Win at Rock Paper Scissors''	2025	—	—	—	—	—	—	—	—	—	—		Non-album Single
''You Think You've Been Buried''	2025	—	—	—	—	—	—	—	—	—	—		Non-album Single
''Brave St Andrew''	2025	—	—	—	—	—	—	—	—	—	—	Used on a documentary on Birmingham F.C.	Non-album Single
''Utopia''	2025												Non-album Single
"—" denotes a recording that did not chart or was not released in that territory.

=== Promotional singles ===
Title	Year	Album
"The Irony of It All"	2002	Original Pirate Material
"It's Too Late" / "Weak Become Heroes"	2002	Original Pirate Material
"Soaked by the Ale"	2004	Fit but You Know It
"Get Out of My House" (Remix)	2005	A Grand Don't Come for Free
"Deluded in My Mind"	2006	Prangin' Out
"I Love You More (Than You Like Me)"	2009	Everything Is Borrowed
"Never Give In"	2009	Everything Is Borrowed
"On the Edge of a Cliff"	2009	Everything Is Borrowed

== Other certified songs ==
List of non-single songs, with selected certifications, showing year released and album name
Title	Year	Certification	Album
"Turn the Page"	2004	BPI: Silver	Original Pirate Material

== Guest appearances ==
Title	Year	Album
"Pure Garage"	2001	Pure Garage V
"Nite Nite" (with Kano and Leo the Lion)	2005	Home Sweet Home
"Excuse My Brother" (with The Mitchell Brothers)	2005	A Breath of Fresh Attire
"Routine Check" (with The Mitchell Brothers & Kano)	2005	A Breath of Fresh Attire
"She's Got It All Wrong" (with The Mitchell Brothers)	2005	A Breath of Fresh Attire
"Harvey Nicks" (with The Mitchell Brothers)	2005	A Breath of Fresh Attire
"Your Song"	2007	Radio 1: Established 1967
"Slow Songs" (with Giggs)	2009	Let Em Ave It
"Who Knows Who" (with Muse)	2009	Uprising
"Crying Game" (with Professor Green)	2010	Alive Till I'm Dead
"Love The Game" (with Kenny Allstar & Not3s)	2018	Block Diaries
"Surrounded" (with Dimzy)	2020	A Glass of Water 2
"Leave The Devil Outside" (with Oscar #Worldpeace)	2020	Sporadic

== Remixes ==
Title	Year	Artist
"So Rotton"	2002	Blak Twang
"Thrilla"	2003	Cassius
"Banquet"	2005	Bloc Party
"Pon De Floor"	2010	Major Lazer
"Revolving"	2011	Spark
"M.O.N.E.Y"	2013	The 1975
"Free My People"	2021	Greentea Peng, Simmy and Kid Cruise
