= Clare Maguire discography =

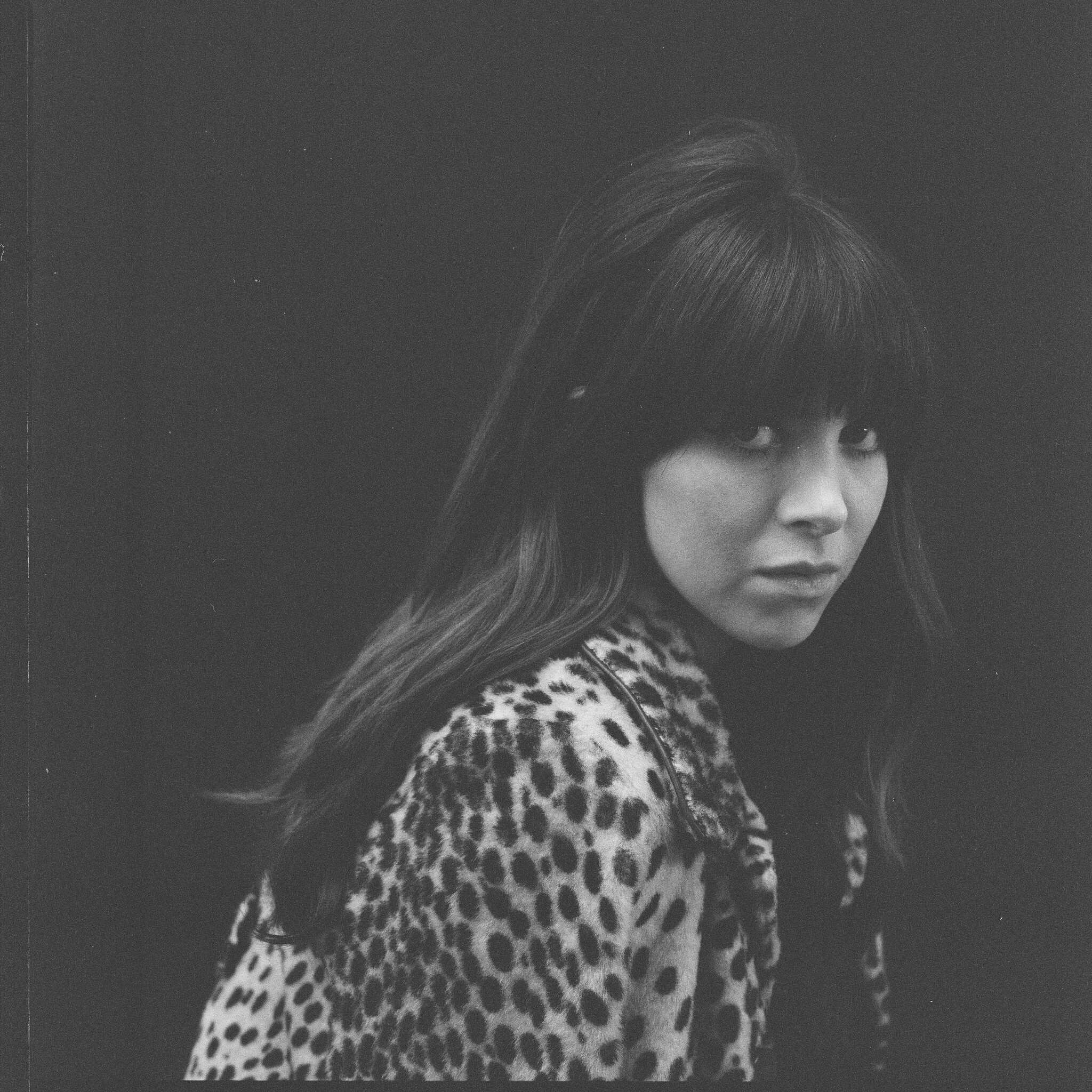
- Studio albums: 2
- Extended plays: 7
- Singles: 11
- Music videos: 5

The discography of Clare Maguire consists of two studio albums, seven extended plays, eleven singles and five music videos. There is also the accompaniment of bonus tracks and promotional singles and an upcoming Studio EP. Maguire's first release came on 18 October 2010, when "Ain't Nobody" was released in the United Kingdom through Polydor Records. The song marked the first appearance of the artist on the UK Singles Chart, when it debuted at number 78. On 26 October, Maguire released her first extended play, Let's Begin as an iTunes exclusive, with track "You're Electric" being selected as Singles of the Week in December.

Maguire's second single release came in the form of "The Last Dance", which having reached BBC Radio 1's B Playlist; debuted at number 23 in the UK and number 12 in Scotland after released on 20 February – marking Maguire's first top 40 hit. The single was succeeded by the release of the debut album, Light After Dark, which having been first released on 28 February debuted at number 7 on the UK Albums Chart and 34 on Irish Albums Chart.

== Albums ==
=== Studio albums ===
Year	Details	Peak chart positions						
Year	Details	UK	AUS	BEL	GER	IRE	POL	SCO
2011	Light After Dark: Released: 28 February 2011; Label: Polydor Records; Formats: CD, digital download, vinyl	7	90	64	47	34	57	6
2016	Stranger Things Have Happened: Released: 27 May 2016; Label: Virgin EMI; Formats: CD, digital download, vinyl	85	—	—	—	—	—	—

== Extended plays ==
Title	Details
Let’s Begin	Released: 19 December 2010; Label: Polydor; Format:Digital download
Clare Maguire	Released: 1 January 2014; Label: Polydor; Format: Digital download
Live For Burberry	Released: 12 January 2015; Label: Virgin EMI; Format: Digital download
Live For Burberry 2	Released: 23 February 2015; Label: Virgin EMI; Format: Digital download
Don't Mess Me Around	Released: 23 February 2015; Label: Virgin EMI; Format: Digital download
Keep Me Hanging On	Released: 2017; Label: Format: Digital download
Isolation EP 2020	Released: 16 June 2020; Format: Digital download

== Singles ==
Year	Single	Peak chart positions					Album
Year	Single	UK	FRA	BEL	DEN	SCO	Album
2010	"Ain't Nobody"	78	—	—	—	—	Light After Dark
2011	"The Last Dance"	23	—	39	3	12	Light After Dark
2011	"The Shield and the Sword"	91	—	—	—	—	Light After Dark
2015	"Don't Mess Me Around"	—	—	—	—	—	Don't Mess Me Around
2016	"Elizabeth Taylor"	—	37	—	—	—	Stranger Things Have Happened
2016	"The Valley"	—	—	—	—	—	Stranger Things Have Happened
2018	"All or Nothing Love"	—	—	—	—	—	Non-album singles
2019	"Bring Me Flowers While I'm Alive Not When I'm Dead"	—	—	—	—	—	Non-album singles
2019	"Heavenly Disaster"	—	—	—	—	—	Non-album singles
2019	"Jungle Gardenia"	—	—	—	—	—	Non-album singles
2019	"Vibe"	—	—	—	—	—	Non-album singles
"—" denotes releases that did not chart or were not released in that country.

== Promotional singles ==
Year	Single	Album
2011	"Lucky"	Light After Dark
2011	"You're Electric"	Light After Dark
2016	"Elizabeth Taylor (Mulholland Edition)"	Non album single

== Music videos ==
Year	Video	Director	References
2010	"Ain't Nobody"	Sam Brown	
2011	"The Last Dance"	Alex & Liane	
2011	"The Shield & The Sword"	Hope Audikana	
2015	"Don't Mess Me Around"		
2016	"Elizabeth Taylor"	Suki Waterhouse	

== Other appearances ==
Year	Title	Artist	Album
2011	Midnight Caller	Chase & Status	No More Idols
2011	Lock the Locks	The Streets	Computers and Blues
2012	Almost Human	High Contrast	The Agony & The Extacy
2012	You Never Asked	The D.O.T	And That
2013	Limitless	BURNS	Limitless – EP
2014	Who's Loving You (Part 2)	High Contrast	Who's Loving You – EP
2016	How Love Begins	DJ Fresh and High Contrast featuring Dizzee Rascal	How Love Begins – EP

== Songwriter credits ==
List of songs written or co-written by Clare Maguire
Title	Year	Album	Artist(s)
"Clear Blue Sky"	2013	Don't Look Down	Skylar Grey
"Own Up"	2014	TBA	Motez (producer)
"W.M."	2020	Black Country Disco	Tom Aspaul

== Covers ==
Maguire has covered many songs while on tour and for acoustic sessions. The below shows these.

Song	Artist
Big Love	Fleetwood Mac
Butcher Boy	Irish Folk Song
He Said	Plan B
Hope There's Someone	Antony & The Johnsons
I Need A Dollar	Aloe Blacc
Love Lockdown	Kanye West
Trouble in Mind	Sister Rosetta Tharpe
