= And That =

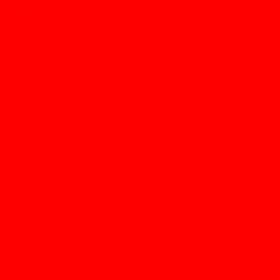

Studio album by The D.O.T.
- Released: 22 October 2012
- Recorded: 2011–2012
- Length: 37:12
- Label: The Beats
- Producer: Mike Skinner

The D.O.T. chronology
And That (2012)	Diary (2013)

Singles from And That
- 1. "You Never Asked" Released: October 8, 2012

Professional ratings
Review scores
Source	Rating
Consequence of Sound	(C+)
The Guardian	3/5 stars
The Independent	4/5 stars
NME	4/5 stars
The Times	3/5 stars

And That is the debut album from Mike Skinner and Rob Harvey's collaboration, The D.O.T. It was released on Skinner's label The Beats on 22 October 2012.

== Critical reception ==
NME wrote: "Skinner’s always known how far to push a track before it sounds like a joke, and everything on The D.O.T’s debut is pushed to that limit. It works."

== Track listing ==
All tracks composed by Mike Skinner and Rob Harvey

1. "And a Hero" - 3:20
2. "You Never Asked" - 3:46 (featuring Clare Maguire and Danny Brown)
3. "Goes Off" - 2:54
4. "Weapon of Choice" - 4:57
5. "Shut Up and Keep Talking" - 2:59
6. "Like You Used To" - 2:27
7. "What You Livin' For?" - 3:36
8. "Right Side of Madness" - 4:11
9. "Strong Skunk" - 3:06
10. "Colours That Don't Exist" - 3:16
11. "Where Did I Go" - 2:46
