= C-Mone =

Rapper

Simone Buchanan, better known by the name C-Mone, is an English rapper. She is from Nottingham, England.

== History ==
C-Mone spent four years with Nottingham's Outdaville Crew before becoming a solo artist in 2002. In 2003, she was featured on Styly Cee's "Joyrider" release. In 2004, C-Mone set up her own independent record label, Dark Whisper Records. In 2005, she was crowned 'Best Female MC' at the Lyric Pad UK Hip Hop Awards. The following year, she released her debut studio album The Butterfly Effect to critical acclaim. The album made the Mercury Music Prize long list.

C-Mone also recorded with Morcheeba and Groove Armada. Additionally, she is featured on The Streets' album A Grand Don't Come for Free.

In 2012, she appeared on the song "Fall from Grace" by fellow rapper Reckless alongside Verses and Long Island emcee Lantz - later released on the album For My Enjoyment Only.

== Discography ==
- The Butterfly Effect (2006)
- Dancing with Mirrors (2011), Dark Whisper Records
