= Blinded by the Lights =

2004 song by the Streets

Single by the Streets

from the album A Grand Don't Come for Free
- Released: 27 September 2004
- Length: 4:45
- Label: Locked On; 679
- Songwriter: Mike Skinner
- Producer: Mike Skinner

The Streets singles chronology
"Dry Your Eyes" (2004)	"Blinded by the Lights" (2004)	"Could Well Be In" (2004)

"Blinded by the Lights" is a song by English rapper and producer Mike Skinner under the music project the Streets. It was released in September 2004 as the third single from the project's second studio album A Grand Don't Come for Free. The song reached number ten on the UK Single Chart and was certified Platinum by the British Phonographic Industry.

== Background ==
Mike Skinner has described the song as “a woozy account of taking drugs in a nightclub.” The lyrics follow the protagonist through the stages of an ecstasy high, capturing anxiety, confusion, paranoia, and the sense of disconnection that comes with overstimulation in a club environment. The lyrics portray feelings of anxiety, jealousy, and paranoia as the narrator loses control of the situation, with moments such as “Swear Simone’s kissing Dan” reflecting mistrust and social unease.

Chart watcher James Masterton of Yahoo! Launch, commenting on its single release, wrote: "After the massive commercial success that was the Number One single 'Dry Your Eyes', the only place to go was down so full marks to Mike Skinner for not even attempting a similar kind of mainstream hit but instead selecting one of the more 'difficult' tracks from A Grand Don't Come For Free."

== Critical reception ==
Clare Considine of Red Bull described it as a rare song that has “distilled UK rave culture" and none have done it "with quite such honesty as Skinner.” HeadStuff similarly emphasized the track’s narrative of panic and disorientation caused by “dodgy ecstasy.”

Leonie Cooper of NME called the best part of the song the, "massive wobbly synth line." Decca Aitkenhead of The Guardian said that, "nothing has ever evoked the atmosphere of clubbing on ecstasy in the 90s more perfectly." Ethan Brown of New York called the song, "a panicky haze of impure pills, paranoia, and social isolation." Andy Battaglia of The A.V. Club called the song, "a sparse, moody track that gets washed in whoosh as his second dose of ecstasy kicks in."

== Music video ==
The music video was directed by Adam Smith and premiered in September 2004.

The video starts with Mike speaking to his girlfriend (Simone) when his phone dies. She texts him saying "C U in da corner xx". Next we see Mike attending what appears to be a wedding reception. He heads to a table with a group of his friends where he starts taking Ecstasy. He pops by the entrance a few times expecting to see Simone but doesn't see her. She is seen kissing another man (presumably Dan). He heads to the bar and starts drinking and takes another pill. Mike goes to the bathroom with his friend to take more drugs where, in the next cubicle, Simone is engaging Dan in oral sex but are almost caught out by Mike. Later, the high from the drugs starts to kick in and Mike is in an elated state as he dances on the dancefloor. He keeps bumping into a few men, and a fight breaks out. One of the men hits Mike, who falls to the floor and the video ends with a shot of Mike lying on the floor with his nose bleeding and unconscious.

Because of the nature of the video, it was only shown after the watershed (9pm) in the UK. Writing on 3 October 2004, Masterton described it as "a controversial video that has nicely made headlines over its inability to be screened at any time when, you know, people might be watching."

The uncensored version was mistakenly broadcast by The Box at 8:55pm on 6 October 2004, and by Q TV at 4:25pm and 6:50pm on 31 October. Although both channels, owned by EMAP Performance TV, scheduled the video to only be played long after the 9pm watershed, a software error led to the pre-watershed broadcasts, and five viewers complained to Ofcom that the scheduling was inappropriate to the video's strong language (fuck and cunt), sexual imagery and graphic depictions of violence and drug use. Ofcom ruled that the broadcasts were in breach of their Programme Code.

== Charts ==
Chart performance for "Blinded by the Lights"
Chart (2004)	Peak position
Australia (ARIA)	92
Germany (GfK)	63
Ireland (IRMA)	16
Scottish Singles Sales (Official Charts)	10
UK Singles (Official Charts)	10
UK Hip Hop/R&B (Official Charts)	2

== Certifications ==
Region	Certification	Certified units/sales
United Kingdom (BPI)	Platinum	600,000^{‡}
^{‡} Sales+streaming figures based on certification alone.
