= Fit but You Know It =

2004 single by the Streets

Single by the Streets

from the album A Grand Don't Come for Free
- B-side: "Soaked by the Ale"
- Released: 26 April 2004
- Length: 4:14
- Label: Locked On; 679
- Songwriter: Mike Skinner
- Producer: Mike Skinner

The Streets singles chronology
"Don't Mug Yourself" (2002)	"Fit but You Know It" (2004)	"Dry Your Eyes" (2004)

"Fit but You Know It" is a song by English rapper and producer Mike Skinner under the music project the Streets. It was released on 26 April 2004 as the lead single of the Streets' second studio album, A Grand Don't Come for Free (2004). The song reached number four on the UK Singles Chart.

== Background ==
Skinner told the Daily Star that the lyrics refer to former S Club 7 member Rachel Stevens who was embarking on a solo career at the time the song was recorded. He later denied the song was about Stevens and said that he threw her name out as a red herring to escape the nosey reporter's questions.

== Critical reception ==
Leonie Cooper of NME called the "chugging beat" and "the extreme rowdiness of it all" the best parts of the song. James Snodgrass of NME called it, "a great first single, it takes a guitar chug and a boozy rant and combines them to joyous effect." Decca Aitkenhead of The Guardian said that the song "managed to capture the comically crude but complex sexual politics of a busy late-night chip shop on a lads' holiday".

== Commercial performance ==
The single reached number four on the UK Singles Chart, spending 15 weeks inside the top 75. In Australia, the song was ranked number 18 on Triple J's Hottest 100 of 2004. It would subsequently appear on the soundtracks for the video games FIFA Football 2005 and Just Dance 2020.

== Music video ==
The music video for the single has a cameo of the cast of The Football Factory which includes Danny Dyer and Frank Harper. In the video, Mike Skinner plays the part of a man picking up his holiday photos from the developers. As the song is playing, he looks through the photos which show scenes from his holiday. The video was released on two separate formats- a DVD single (which also included the video for "The Irony of It All") and a bonus DVD which came with some copies of parent album A Grand Don't Come for Free.

== Track listings ==
UK single CD1
No.	Title	Length
1.	"Fit but You Know It" (radio edit)	3:08
2.	"Soaked by the Ale"	3:33
Total length:		06:41

UK single CD2
No.	Title	Length
1.	"Fit but You Know It" (album version)	4:11
2.	"Fit but You Know It" (featuring the Futureheads)	3:55
3.	"Fit but You Know It" (featuring Kano, Donae'o, Lady Sovereign and Tinchy Stryder)	3:47
4.	"Fit but You Know It" (Donae'o remix)	2:46
5.	"Fit but You Know It" (video)	3:34
Total length:		18:13

== Charts ==
=== Weekly charts ===
Chart (2004)	Peak position
Australia (ARIA)	37
Germany (GfK)	85
Ireland (IRMA)	11
Scottish Singles Sales (Official Charts)	6
Sweden (Sverigetopplistan)	42
UK Singles (Official Charts)	4
UK Hip Hop/R&B (Official Charts)	1

=== Year-end charts ===
Chart (2004)	Position
UK Singles (OCC)	70

== Certifications ==
Region	Certification	Certified units/sales
United Kingdom (BPI)	Platinum	600,000^{‡}
^{‡} Sales+streaming figures based on certification alone.

== Release history ==
Region	Date	Format(s)	Label(s)	Ref.
United Kingdom	26 April 2004	CD	Locked On; 679	
Australia	10 May 2004	CD	Locked On; 679	
