= Diary (The D.O.T. album) =

Studio album by The D.O.T.
- Released: 6 May 2013
- Length: 37:59
- Label: Cooking Vinyl
- Producer: Mike Skinner

The D.O.T. chronology
And That (2012)	Diary (2013)

Singles from Diary
- 1. "How We All Lie" Released: 4 March 2013; 2. "Blood, Sweat and Tears" Released: 6 May 2013; 3. "Left at the Lights" Released: 15 July 2013

Professional ratings
Aggregate scores
Source	Rating
Metacritic	54/100
Review scores
Source	Rating
AllMusic	3/5 stars
DIY	3.5/5 stars
Drowned in Sound	7/10
The Guardian	2/5 stars
MusicOMH	2.5/5 stars
NME	1.5/5 stars

Diary is the second studio album by the collaboration of Mike Skinner and Robert Harvey as The D.O.T. It was released on 6 May 2013 by Cooking Vinyl Records.

== Release ==
On 1 March 2013, it was announced the D.O.T. was releasing their second studio album Diary for release on 6 May 2013.

The first single "How We All Lie" was released on 4 March 2013.

The second single "Blood, Sweat and Tears" was released on 6 May 2013.

The third single "Left at the Lights" was released on 15 July 2013.

== Critical reception ==
Diary was met with "mixed or average" reviews from critics. At Metacritic, which assigns a weighted average rating out of 100 to reviews from mainstream publications, this release received an average score of 54 based on 7 reviews.

In a review for AllMusic, critic reviewer Daniel Clancy wrote: "Diary features a wide array of styles, from the vibrant dance of "Wherever You May Be" to the indie pop of "Left at the Lights," but neither of those hit the right note and only serve as evidence that Skinner is perhaps spreading his ambitious production skills a little too thinly." Tomas Doyle of DIY said the release is "made to a high level of gloss and sheen but never feels over done, rather it revels in its layered orchestration which will leave those who are inclined to look discovering something new with each listen." At NME, Lucy Jones explained that Diary was "poorly produced" and some of the songs "sound like demos, or leftovers from their hugely disappointing 2012 debut album And That."

== Track listing ==
Diary track listing
No.	Title	Writer(s)	Length
1.	"Make It Your Own"	Robert Harvey; Mike Skinner	1:02
2.	"Don't Look at the Road"	Stuart Coleman; Steve Corley; Harvey; Skinner	3:17
3.	"Blood, Sweat and Tears"	Wayne Bennett; Chris Brown; Harvey; Skinner	3:17
4.	"How We All Lie"	Coleman; Corley; Harvey; Skinner	3:23
5.	"Under a Ladder"	Harvey; Skinner	3:16
6.	"Makers Mark"	Harvey; Skinner	3:37
7.	"Left at the Lights"	Harvey; Skinner	3:45
8.	"Left Alone"	Bennett; Brown; Harvey; Skinner	2:56
9.	"Wherever You May Be"	Harvey; Skinner	3:30
10.	"Most of My Time"	Bennett; Brown; Harvey; Skinner	3:29
11.	"What Am I Supposed to Do?"	Harvey; Skinner	3:31
12.	"How Hard Can It Be?"	Bennett; Brown; Harvey; Skinner; Ted May	2:56

Japanese bonus tracks
No.	Title	Length
13.	"Everything Falls"
14.	"Imagine the Worst"
15.	"Heart Won't Bruise"
16.	"How We All Lie" (Baxta Remix)
17.	"How We All Lie" (Jett Remix)
18.	"How We All Lie" (Mike Sour Trap Remix)
