= Dry Your Eyes =

2004 single by the Streets

Single by the Streets

from the album A Grand Don't Come for Free
- Released: 19 July 2004
- Length: 4:32
- Label: Locked On; 679
- Songwriter: The Streets
- Producer: The Streets

The Streets singles chronology
"Fit but You Know It" (2004)	"Dry Your Eyes" (2004)	"Blinded by the Lights" (2004)

"Dry Your Eyes" is a single by English rapper and producer Mike Skinner under the music project the Streets. It was released in the UK on 19 July 2004. The song is the Streets' most successful single, reaching number one in the United Kingdom on 25 July 2004, six days after its release. "Dry Your Eyes" also went straight to number one in Ireland staying there for three weeks in a row.

An early version of the track featured Chris Martin of Coldplay singing the chorus, but he decided against its release, believing his contribution did not work as well as others. The final version was delivered by singer-songwriter Matt Sladen, who was also a member of the band Officers.

== Content ==
The song describes the protagonist trying to cope with his girlfriend breaking up with him. Dig! wrote that the track finds Skinner "blindsided by an unexpected breakup," and portrays the moment when "his whole life turned around."

== Music structure ==
"Dry Your Eyes" is composed in the key of A major. It is written in common time and moves at a slow tempo of 80 beats per minute. The song is carried by a first inversion triad. The radio edit of the song, lasting 3:22, omits the bridge and third verse. The official video uses this edit. However, some radio edits move the interlude after the second chorus to the beginning of the song.

The melody was taken straight from a royalty-free samples CD released in 1999. A plagiarism claim by unknown artist Epic was reported in the press in 2004, but no case was ever made.

== Critical reception ==
Leonie Cooper of NME called "those violins, bringing all of the emotions" the best part of the song. Tony Naylor of NME called the song, "a hairs-on-the-back-of-your-neck ballad for jilted lovers" and stated, "rarely has Skinner sounded so vulnerable, poignant and, well, normal." The Guardian described the track as "a heartfelt exploration of how it feels to be dumped." LouderSound referred to it as "a stirring break-up ballad," emphasizing its emotional tone.

In Australia, the song was ranked number 19 on Triple J's Hottest 100 of 2004. In October 2011, NME placed it at number 87 on its list "150 Best Tracks of the Past 15 Years".

== Track listings ==
UK CD1

1. "Dry Your Eyes"
2. "It's Too Late" (live radio session)

UK CD2 and Australian CD single

1. "Dry Your Eyes"
2. "Let's Push Things Forward" (live radio session)
3. "Has It Come To This?" (live radio session)
4. "Dry Your Eyes" (enhanced video)

== Charts ==
=== Weekly charts ===
Chart (2004)	Peak position
Australia (ARIA)	42
Austria (Ö3 Austria Top 40)	5
Belgium (Ultratop 50 Flanders)	48
Croatia (HRT)	6
Europe (Eurochart Hot 100)	3
Germany (GfK)	53
Ireland (IRMA)	1
Netherlands (Dutch Top 40)	24
Netherlands (Single Top 100)	11
New Zealand (Recorded Music NZ)	15
Scottish Singles Sales (Official Charts)	1
Sweden (Sverigetopplistan)	24
UK Singles (Official Charts)	1
UK Hip Hop/R&B (Official Charts)	1

=== Year-end charts ===
Chart (2004)	Position
Austria (Ö3 Austria Top 40)	58
UK Singles (OCC)	20

== Certifications ==
Region	Certification	Certified units/sales
United Kingdom (BPI)	Platinum	600,000^{‡}
^{‡} Sales+streaming figures based on certification alone.

== Release history ==
Region	Date	Format(s)	Label(s)	Ref.
United Kingdom	19 July 2004	CD	Locked On; 679	
Australia	9 August 2004	CD	Locked On; 679	

== Cover version ==
A version of "Dry Your Eyes" featuring Chris Martin of Coldplay singing the chorus surfaced on the internet and received airplay on Los Angeles radio station Indie 103.1. This version was recorded for a BBC Radio 1 competition (listeners were told to call in when they heard this version of the song) and was never officially released, because Chris Martin did not agree with his vocal performance. This version frequently found American airplay on WFNX after its release.
