= Never Went to Church =

Single by The Streets

from the album The Hardest Way to Make an Easy Living
- Released: 5 June 2006
- Genre: Hip hop
- Length: 3:18
- Label: 679
- Songwriter(s): Mike Skinner, Lennon-McCartney
- Producer(s): Mike Skinner

The Streets singles chronology
"When You Wasn't Famous" (2006)	"Never Went to Church" (2006)	"Prangin' Out" (2006)

Alternative Covers

Alternative cover

"Never Went to Church" is a single by English rapper and producer Mike Skinner under the music project the Streets, from their third studio album, The Hardest Way to Make an Easy Living. "Never Went to Church" is a tribute to Mike Skinner's late father. The piano line is similar to the chord progression from the song "Let It Be" by the Beatles.

The B-side of this single is a cover of the song by Guillemots.

The single peaked at number 20 on the UK Singles Chart.
