= None of Us Are Getting Out of This Life Alive =

Mixtape by the Streets
- Released: 10 July 2020
- Length: 39:01
- Label: Island

The Streets chronology
Computers and Blues (2011)	None of Us Are Getting Out of This Life Alive (2020)	The Darker the Shadow, the Brighter the Light (2023)

Professional ratings
Aggregate scores
Source	Rating
Metacritic	73/100
Review scores
Source	Rating
AllMusic	3.5/5 stars
Clash	6/10
DIY	5/5 stars
Exclaim!	7/10
Mojo	4/5 stars
musicOMH	4/5 stars
NME	4/5 stars
Pitchfork	5.5/10
Q	4/5 stars
Uncut	3.5/5 stars

None of Us Are Getting Out of This Life Alive is a mixtape by English rapper and producer Mike Skinner, under his music project the Streets. It was released on 10 July 2020 under Island Records.

== Singles ==
On 14 April 2020, the Streets announced the first single "Call My Phone Thinking I'm Doing Nothing Better", which features Australian artist Tame Impala. The second single "I Wish You Loved You As Much As You Love Him", which features Greentea Peng and Donae'o, was released on 4 June 2020.

== Critical reception ==
None of Us Are Getting Out of This Life Alive was met with "generally favorable" reviews from critics. At Metacritic, which assigns a weighted average rating out of 100 to reviews from mainstream publications, this release received an average score of 73, based on 15 reviews. Aggregator Album of the Year gave the album 68 out of 100 based on a critical consensus of 26 reviews.

== Track listing ==
Track listing adapted from Tidal

None of Us Are Getting Out of This Life Alive track listing
No.	Title	Music	Length
1.	"Call My Phone Thinking I'm Doing Nothing Better" (featuring Tame Impala)	Mike Skinner; Kevin Parker	2:49
2.	"None of us Are Getting Out of This Life Alive" (featuring Idles)	M. Skinner; Adam Debonshire; Jack Looker; Jonathan Beavis; Joe Talbot; Lee Kiernan	3:53
3.	"I Wished You Loved You As Much As You Love Him" (featuring Greentea Peng and Donae'o)	M. Skinner; Aria Wells; Ian Greenidge	2:54
4.	"You Can't Afford Me" (featuring Ms Banks)	M. Skinner; Ms Banks; Wayne Bennett	3:06
5.	"I Know Something You Did" (featuring Jesse James Solomon and Eliza)	M. Skinner; Eliza Caird; Jesse Willis; W. Bennett	3:39
6.	"Eskimo Ice" (featuring Kasien)	M. Skinner; Kasien Daly	3:22
7.	"Phone is Always in My Hand" (featuring Dapz On The Map)	M. Skinner; Daniel Francis	3:20
8.	"The Poison I Take Hoping You Will Suffer" (featuring Oscar #Worldpeace)	M. Skinner; Daniel Natoro; Oscar Antwi-Nyanin	3:20
9.	"Same Direction" (featuring Jimothy)	M. Skinner; Jimothy Lacoste	3:15
10.	"Falling Down" (featuring Hak Baker)	M. Skinner; Hakeem Omarley Baker	2:52
11.	"Conspiracy Theory Freestyle" (featuring Rob Harvey)	M. Skinner; Robert Harvey	3:04
12.	"Take Me As I Am" (featuring Chris Lorenzo)	M. Skinner; Christopher Lawrence	3:07
Total length:			39:01

== Charts ==
Chart performance for None of Us Are Getting Out of This Life Alive
Chart (2020)	Peak position
Belgian Albums (Ultratop Flanders)	179
German Albums (Offizielle Top 100)	30
Irish Albums (Official Charts)	35
Scottish Albums (Official Charts)	2
Swiss Albums (Schweizer Hitparade)	22
UK Albums (Official Charts)	2
