= The Shield and the Sword =

Single by Clare Maguire

from the album Light After Dark
- Released: 9 May 2011
- Genre: Pop; soul; disco
- Length: 3:32
- Label: Polydor Records
- Songwriter(s): Clare Maguire, Fraser T Smith

Clare Maguire singles chronology
"The Last Dance" (2011)	"The Shield and the Sword" (2011)	"Don't Mess Me Around" (2015)

The Shield and the Sword is the third single by English singer-songwriter Clare Maguire, taken from her debut album Light After Dark. It was released in the United Kingdom on 9 May 2011 through Polydor Records.

== Live performances ==
Maguire performed the song on air for the first time on Ruth Jones' Easter Treat on Saturday 23 April 2011. She also performed the song on T4, music show Koko Pop, and in Ireland on The Late Late Show.

== Music video ==
The music video was directed by directing duo Hope Audikana (Ryan and Egoitz respectively), and premiered on 19 April 2011 on Maguire's official Vevo account. It depicts Maguire in a number of different guises singing and dancing. Maguire had stated the intention of the music video to really promote the pop elements of the song, and was one of her biggest wishes when shooting the video.

As it stands, the video has been taken down from Maguire's VEVO and personal YouTube accounts, and any attempt to re-upload the music video is met by a copyright claim from the Universal Music Group.

== Reception ==
Lewis Corner of Digital Spy gave the song 4 out of 5 stars, commenting that "never let it be said that Clare Maguire is workshy. Having juggled the release of her top ten album, a headline UK tour and a support slot for The Script, it's no wonder her impressive remixes are causing her the occasional out-of-body experience. In fact, looking at the accompanying promo for her latest chart assault, she appears to have turned her psychological issues into an art form.

"You have the shield/ I'll take the sword/ I no longer love you," Maguire booms in her distinctive Lennox-meets-Moyet tone over soaring strings, a funky piano riff and a thumping beat that sounds like a soul/disco mash-up released from the M People vaults. In fact, the only thing convincing us it's not is her co-write on the track itself - does this woman ever stop?"

== Charts ==
Chart (2011)	Peak positions
UK Singles (The Official Charts Company)	91

== Release history ==
Region	Date	Label	Format
United Kingdom	9 May 2011	Polydor	Digital download
