= Ted Mayhem =

British hip hop vocalist

Ted Mayhem is a hip hop vocalist and record label boss from London, England. He is the main voice of Beat Stevie.

Mayhem was Mike Skinner's partner in his record label The Beats where he discovered and signed Professor Green and Example (musician). He was also the producer and writer of his television show Beat Stevie which he co-presents with Skinner on Channel 4. He also performs vocals on a number of Streets tracks, including "When You Wasn't Famous" from The Hardest Way to Make an Easy Living.

Mayhem appears in numerous Streets and Beats videos and accepted the award for the "British male solo artist" award for the Streets at the 2005 BRIT Awards. Mayhem won the Best Music Blog award at the 2006 BT digital music awards for his blog on the beats myspace page. www.myspace.com/thebeatsrecordings.

Ted also won a BT Digital Music Award for Best Artist on behalf of The Streets digital marketing campaign in 2011.
