= Don't Mess Me Around =

EP by Clare Maguire
- Released: 23 February 2015
- Genre: British soul, pop
- Length: 14:55
- Label: Virgin EMI

Clare Maguire chronology
Light After Dark (2011)	Don't Mess Me Around (2015)	Stranger Things Have Happened (2016)

Don't Mess Me Around is a 2015 EP studio release from Clare Maguire, released on 23 February 2015.

The lyrics for the title track were written eight years earlier, before she was signed to her label. It was the song that got her signed. Maguire included "Don't Mess Me Around" on the EP in order to go back to the beginning, before the fame and the fall. "Boomerang" uses hip-hop beats and a gospel spike, "Dream Big" provides inspiration with a slower pace, and "Sherlock" drops back into snarling 1950's blues as it deals with betrayal.

== Track listing ==
All tracks are written by Clare Maguire and Tom Wright-Goss, except where noted.

No.	Title	Writer(s)	Length
1.	"Don't Mess Me Around"	Clare Maguire, Samuel Dixon	3:30
2.	"Boomerang"		2:32
3.	"Dream Big"		2:55
4.	"Sherlock"		2:42
Total length:			11:39
