= Greentea Peng =

English singer-songwriter

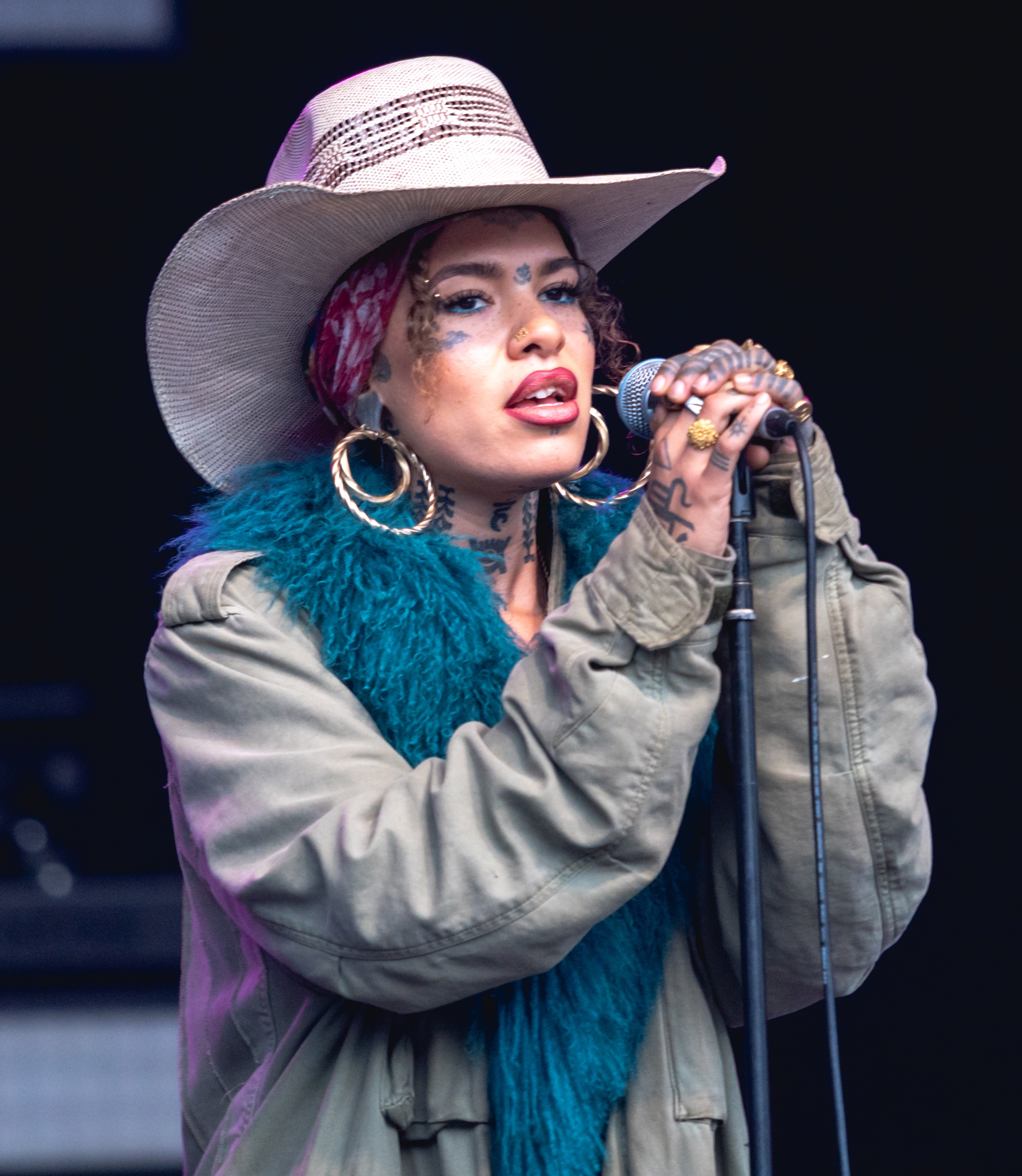
- Greentea Peng in 2021

Background information
- Born: Aria Wells; 1 December 1994 (age 31); Bermondsey, South London, England
- Genres: Neo soul
- Occupations: Singer; songwriter
- Years active: 2017–present
- Labels: TENNNN; Different Recordings; EMI; AMF Records

Aria Wells (born 1 December 1994), known professionally as Greentea Peng is an English singer-songwriter. Along with her music, she is also known for her distinctive fashion style with full-body tattoos, many piercings and much jewellery.

== Early life ==
Aria Wells was born in Bermondsey, South London, to an Arab father, who was a trained actor, and African mother. Wells resided in London for the majority of her childhood. During this period, she absorbed musical influences from her father, who introduced her to theatre and taught her songs. Meanwhile, she partook in singing for school activities and community events, especially church choir.

At age 12, after her parents separated, she and her mother moved to Hastings. Her mother refused to have her attend secondary school in South London given the schools were, according to Wells, "really bad at the time, all transitioning into academies and stuff". Wells often returned to London over the summer holidays, visiting her father. Between places, she continued pursuing music by writing her own music and doing performances. However, due to bullying, she lost her self-confidence and decided to stop making music by the age of 15. She also had passed her GCSEs early and eventually dropped out.

Upon her return to London at 17, she worked at various bars and frequently partied. One of the bars she worked at the longest was in the nightclub Visions, located in Dalston. Amid all this, Wells had been struggling with substance abuse. In an interview with District Magazine, she recalled dealing with addiction to drugs, such as Xanax, "for a long time, from a young age".

== Career ==
=== 2011–2015: Travelling, recovery and return to music ===
Wells had plans to travel after saving enough money from bartending. Together with her boyfriend at the time, she began making trips to California and Peru. Her stage name, Greentea Peng, emerged from a box of Green Tea Seng she bought at a Peruvian chemist. She added the UK slang term 'peng' (meaning 'very attractive' or 'extremely good') based on her regular usage of it and how she liked the design of the woman, donning a weed bikini, on the Green Tea Seng box.

Wells' longest trip had been to Tulum, Mexico. She had a friend who resided there, who allowed her and her then-boyfriend to stay in their home. After multiple jobs at different hotels, Wells then started working at a self-help yoga retreat, where she helped organize workshops and classes. Throughout her time there, despite being initially sceptical, she began to apply the retreat's teachings to her own life. Wells soon gained the confidence once more to pursue music again. Before she even started doing music again, she also became friends with her current manager, UK designer, visual artist, and musician KESH. The two had met through a mutual friend at a beach.

Wells performed the song "Smile" by Lily Allen at an open mic. Afterwards, she was asked by a guitarist to join their band, Los Hedonistas. When she started singing with the Los Hedonistas, they played numerous gigs covering songs. Wells had earned more money from performing, which she said was "1500 [pesos] a show", than her income from previous jobs.

=== 2016–2019: Sensi, Rising and rise to popularity ===
After staying in Mexico for six months, Wells returned to London. She soon met her producer, Earbuds, and both began developing her debut six-track EP Sensi. The majority of the tracks in Sensi focused on her breakup with an ex, as well as a gradual withdrawal from marijuana. She also wanted Sensi to reflect the emotions she had been harbouring and suppressing, as she stated that she made "something that sounds beautiful but contains some of that stickiness too".

Her debut EP, Sensi, was released in October 2018 on TENNNN. Media figures noted the multiple genres incorporated within the record's sound, including R&B, hip hop and dub reggae. Soon after, Wells quickly started working on her next EP, Rising, again collaborating with Earbuds. In an MTV interview, she recalled being at her studio for a month, where she "banged out 15 tunes".

On 17 June 2019, Wells' performance of her single "Downers" was uploaded on the popular YouTube channel COLORS. By October, the video had reached 2.5 million views. Following this success, her music video for the single "Mister Sun (miss da sun)" premiered on her YouTube channel. Directed by Felix Brady, the video became distinctly known for its "dreamlike, kaleidoscopic visuals", as Wells is depicted navigating through mirror portals into various environments. On 1 November 2019, her second EP, Rising, came out on Different Recordings.

Aside from music, she has partaken in promotional campaigns for a few clothing brands. In August 2019, she sported rainbow knitwear made by AGR designer, Alicia Robinson, for the Notting Hill Carnival. In October 2019 she was also part of a promotional campaign for the sportswear brand Adidas, featuring poster advertisements and commissioned remix collaborations between up and coming artists from around the world.

=== 2020–2022: Man Made and Greenzone 108 ===
In January 2020, Wells was featured in The Observer newspaper's 20 for 2020 list of rising stars in music, media and culture. In June 2020 she featured on The Streets' single "I Wish You Loved You as Much As You Love Him", from the mixtape None of Us Are Getting Out of This Life Alive. In August 2020, she released her single "Hu Man". She later performed the track on her television debut in an episode of Later... with Jools Holland.

In November 2020, her song "Revolution" came out as a response to the world events and social tensions that emerged during the COVID-19 pandemic. English musician Tadafi produced the beat for her years ago, but she decided to collaborate with him after he played it for her a second time upon meeting again. Lyrically, Wells wanted to encourage people to be wary of the causes they fight for. On 1 December, celebrating her birthday, she had the music video for another single "Spells" uploaded onto her YouTube channel.

In January 2021 she placed fourth in the BBC's Sound of... 2021 list. On 24 February 2021, she put forth her next single "Nah, it Ain't the Same", together with a music video. Given the stream of singles, Wells revealed that she was making her upcoming full-length album, Man Made (stylised in all capitals), which she stated will be set at a frequency of 432 Hz.

In June 2021, she released the album Man Made on AMF Records.

In 2022, due to the ongoing COVID-19 pandemic, she cancelled her UK headline tour that was set to occur in March.

In March 2022, Greentea Peng released the first single, "Your Mind", for the mixtape Greenzone 108 (stylized in all capitals). The track, which was originally believed to be a stand-alone single, was produced by Nat Powers, Jon Mills, and Dom Carmelo. To support the release of the single, she released "Be Kind To Your Mind" t-shirts and posters, from which all of the proceeds were donated to the charity Young Minds. On 10 June 2022, she released the second single, "Stuck In The Middle". It was produced by MJ Cole and Swindle and was accompanied by a music video designed by AboveGround. Also on 10 June 2022, the album The Versions by Neneh Cherry was released, on which she appeared on the track "Buddy X". On 19 August 2022, she released the third single, "Look To Him", which was accompanied by a music video, directed by Felix Brady. A week after the release of this single she announced the mixtape. On 9 September 2022, the mixtape Greenzone 108 was released through EMI.

=== 2023–present: Tell Dem It's Sunny ===
In March 2025, she released the album Tell Dem It's Sunny (stylised in all capitals) on AWAL.

== Artistry ==
Her musical influences include Lauryn Hill, Erykah Badu, Miss Dynamite and Lily Allen. Her stage name is taken from her love of green tea, and the London slang word 'peng', which means attractive or tasty.

She describes her genres as neo-soul and "psychedelic R'n'B".

== Discography ==
=== Studio albums ===
- Man Made (4 June 2021)
- Tell Dem It's Sunny (21 March 2025)

=== Mixtapes ===
- Greenzone 108 (9 September 2022)

=== Extended plays ===
- Sensi (12 October 2018)
- Rising (1 November 2019)

=== Singles ===
- "Moonchild" (14 April 2018)
- "Loving Kind" (13 June 2018)
- "Medicine" (13 August 2018)
- "Downers" (12 July 2019)
- "Mr. Sun (miss da sun)" (25 September 2019)
- "Clockin'" (1 December 2019)
- "Ghost Town" (3 March 2020)
- "Hu Man" (4 August 2020)
- "Revolution" (30 October 2020)
- "Spells" (30 November 2020)
- "Nah It Ain't the Same" (23 February 2021)
- "Kali V2" (13 April 2021)
- "Dingaling" (14 May 2021)
- "Free My People" (featuring Simmy and Kid Cruise) (9 September 2021)
- "Your Mind" (10 March 2022)
- "Stuck in the Middle" (10 June 2022)
- "Look to Him" (19 August 2022)
- "Top Steppa V2" (featuring Nightmares On Wax) (28 December 2022)
- "TARDIS (hardest)" (11 October 2024)
- "One Foot" (29 November 2024)
