= Phuturistix =

English musical duo

- Origin: Manchester, England
- Genres: UK garage, broken beat
- Years active: Late 1990s–present
- Labels: Locked On, Hospital, Phuture Lounge
- Members: Zed Bias; DJ Injekta

Phuturistix is an English musical duo consisting of Zed Bias (real name Dave Jones) and DJ Injekta (real name Sefton Motley) who operate within the UK garage and broken beat genres. Phuturistix has released one album on Hospital Records and one album on its self-run Phuture Lounge Recordings.

== Discography ==
=== Albums ===
- Feel It Out (2003), Hospital Records
- Breathe Some Light (2007), Phuture Lounge

=== Singles and EPs ===
- Matrix EP (2000), Locked On
- Deepdown EP (2001), Locked On
- "Feel It Out" (2003), Hospital Records
- "Beautiful" (2003), Hospital Records
- "Beautiful (Remixes)" (2003), Hospital Records
- "Cohiba" (2005), Phuture Lounge
- "Fly Away" (2006), Phuture Lounge
