= Cyberspace and Reds =

Mixtape by the Streets
- Released: 24 January 2011 (UK)
- Recorded: 2010
- Length: 39:48
- Label: Self-released
- Producer: Mike Skinner

The Streets chronology
Everything Is Borrowed (2008)	Cyberspace and Reds (2011)	Computers and Blues (2011)

Professional ratings
Review scores
Source	Rating
No Ripcord	9/10
PopMatters	7/10

Cyberspace and Reds is a mixtape by Mike Skinner under his alias the Streets, released on 24 January 2011.

== History ==
In November 2010, Mike Skinner announced via the official Streets website, that he will release what he referred to as a "mixtape" album called Cyberspace and Reds, consisting of various recordings he had made since he finished work on the final Streets album Computers and Blues. The album cover is the first computer-related photo tweeted to Skinner after his announcement of the album. The album was initially released only for download via the Streets iPhone app. Users of the app were required to scan one barcode displayed on the website, and the barcode "from the side of a 300g tin of tomato soup by a well known brand" (the brand turned out to be Heinz). Three days after this release, a so-called "deluxe" edition was made available for general download through the Streets website; it featured a reworked version of Robots are taking over, as well as a bonus track called At the back of the line.

== Track listing ==
No.	Title	Length
1.	"Came in through the door" (featuring Kano)	3:07
2.	"4 o'Clock"	3:47
3.	"Don't hide away" (featuring Wiley, Rinse and Ice Kid)	3:13
4.	"Too numb" (featuring roxXxan)	3:57
5.	"Backseat barz" (featuring Loudmouth)	5:26
6.	"Tidy nice and neat" (featuring Ghostpoet)	2:08
7.	"The morning after the day off on one" (featuring Trim)	1:55
8.	"Cinema barz" (featuring Jammer)	2:52
9.	"Breakbat barz" (featuring Scru Fizzer)	2:20
10.	"Something to hide"	2:14
11.	"Robots are taking over" (featuring Envy and Elro - Deluxe edition version featuring Envy, Elro and Frisco)	2:46
12.	"Cross that line" (featuring Fumin)	3:04
13.	"Minding my own" (featuring Wretch 32)	3:01
14.	"At the back of the line" (featuring Joey G-Zus; only on Deluxe Edition)	2:01

== Release history ==
Region	Date	Label
Download	24 January 2011	self-released
