= Zed Bias =

English electronic musician

- Also known as: Maddslinky
- Born: Dave Jones
- Origin: United Kingdom
- Genres: UK garage; 2-step garage; UK funky; broken beat
- Occupation(s): Record producer, DJ
- Years active: Mid 1990s–present
- Labels: Locked On; Sidewinder/Sidestepper; Tru Thoughts; Sick Trumpet
- Member of: Phuturistix
- Website: zedbias.net

Dave Jones, better known as Zed Bias, is an English electronic musician based in Manchester, who operates within the UK garage/2-step, broken beat and UK funky genres, as a producer and as a DJ. He has also released material under various pseudonyms including Maddslinky and is one half of the duo Phuturistix.

Bias is best known for his single "Neighbourhood" which reached No. 25 on the UK charts in July 2000, having created a large underground response from late 1999 in its original version, and which started life as a dubplate for local DJ Glenn Woods. Living in Milton Keynes at the time, he collaborated with several other local artists and DJs resulting in a host of well-received tracks and remixes early in his producing career, such as "Standard Hoodlum Issue" with DJ Spatts (The Criminal Minds) and DJ Principle with "All Night Jam". Some of these have been released on his own Sidewinder/Sidestepper and Biasonic labels.

Bias started to record under the Maddslinky name in 2001, resulting in the album Make Your Peace in 2003 and a second Make a Change in 2010. Around the same time, he also became one half of the production duo Phuturistix and has been engaged in remixing duties for many well-known artists.

Bias' releases, which explore a more experimental or progressive side of the 2-step garage sound, have been hailed as a crucial element in the establishment of dubstep as a definable sound or genre.

== Discography ==
=== Albums ===
- Make Your Peace (2003, Laws of Motion) – as Maddslinky
- Feel It Out (2003, Hospital) – as Phuturistix
- Breathe Some Light (2007, Phuture Lounge) – as Phuturistix
- Experiments with Biasonics Vol. 1 (2007, Sick Trumpet)
- Make a Change (2010, Tru Thoughts) – as Maddslinky
- Biasonic Hotsauce: Birth of the Nanocloud (2011, Tru Thoughts)
- Sleepin Giantz (2012, Tru Thoughts)
- Boss (2013, Swamp81) - UK Dance #40
- Different Response (2017, Exit Records)

=== DJ mixes ===
- Sound of the Pirates (2000, Locked On)
- Bingo Beats Vol. 2 (2001, Bingo Beats)
- Mighty Reaction (2003, Nab Records)

=== Notable singles ===
- "Neighbourhood" (1999/2000, Locked On) - UK #25, UK Dance #3, UK Indie #4
- "Standard Hoodlum Issue" (1999, Social Circles) - as ES (Environmental Science) Dubs
- "All Night Jam" (1999, Public Demand)
- "Feel It Out" (2003, Hospital) - as Phuturistix
- "Somethin' Extra" (2005, Askew) - as Maddslinky
- "Time" (2007, Sick Trumpet)
- "Special" (2010, Tru Thoughts) - as Maddslinky
- "Music Deep Inside" (2011, Swamp81)
- "Subway Baby" (2011, Swamp81)
- "Badness/Trouble in the Streets" (2011, Tru Thoughts) - UK Physical #44
- "Hurting Me" (2012, Digital Soundboy)

== See also ==
- Phuturistix
