= Computers and Blues =

Studio album by The Streets
- Released: 7 February 2011 (UK)
- Recorded: 2009–2010
- Length: 43:23
- Label: Atlantic
- Producer: Mike Skinner

The Streets chronology
Cyberspace and Reds (2011)	Computers and Blues (2011)	None of Us Are Getting Out of This Life Alive (2020)

Singles from Computers and Blues
- 1. "Going Through Hell" Released: 30 January 2011; 2. "OMG" Released: 17 April 2011

Computers and Blues is the fifth studio album by English rapper and producer Mike Skinner, under the music project The Streets. It was officially released in the United Kingdom on 7 February 2011; at the time Skinner said it would be the last Streets album although the project did subsequently relaunch in 2017 and 2020.

It contains 14 songs, including an appearance from British singer-songwriter Clare Maguire. Rob Harvey of The Music worked closely with Skinner on the album and features on several songs. The cover photo is a close-up of the Ziggurats, Norfolk Terrace halls of residence at the University of East Anglia designed by architect Denys Lasdun. The 'Blues' part of the title refers to Skinner's beloved Birmingham City.

== Composition ==
In contrast to the "self-indulgent meltdown" of The Hardest Way to Make an Easy Living (2006) and the '"philosophy for beginners" approach' of Everything Is Borrowed (2008), Computers and Blues returns to the garage instrumentals and "everyman" presentation of real life of Original Pirate Material (2002) and A Grand Don't Come for Free (2004). It is primarily about technology's control on society, such as romantic dates on Facebook and addiction to Xbox gaming. Although Skinner sometimes raps about topics typical of his earliest albums, such as drinking ("Without Thinking") and being a stoner ("Roof of Your Car"), he also discusses issues unique to his later years, such as struggling with chronic fatigue syndrome ("Trying To Kill M.E.") and seeing his daughter's ultrasound ("Blip on a Screen"). Occasionally, the rapper references science fiction writer J. G. Ballard. As Skinner laments on "Puzzled By People", "You can’t Google the solutions to people’s problems."

== Reception ==
Professional ratings
Aggregate scores
Source	Rating
AnyDecentMusic?	6.6/10
Metacritic	70/100
Review scores
Source	Rating
AllMusic	4/5 stars
The A.V. Club	B−
Clash	7/10
The Guardian	3/5 stars
The Independent	4/5 stars
MusicOMH	4.5/5 stars
NME	8/10
Pitchfork	5.7/10
PopMatters	7/10
Q	4/5 stars

Sean O'Neal of The A.V. Club argued that despite some moments that "remind that he won't be easily replaced", most of Computers and Blues suffered from "rote rehash" in the lyrics, and "awkward nods to trends from a guy who once sought to push things forward", such as Auto-tuned hooks and references to internet lingo like "OMG".

== Track listing ==
No.	Title	Length
1.	"Outside Inside"	3:02
2.	"Going Through Hell" (featuring Robert Harvey of The Music)	3:08
3.	"Roof of Your Car"	3:12
4.	"Puzzled By People"	3:08
5.	"Without Thinking" (featuring Sharlene Hector)	3:18
6.	"Blip on a Screen"	3:34
7.	"Those That Don't Know"	2:54
8.	"Soldiers" (featuring Robert Harvey of The Music)	3:37
9.	"We Can Never Be Friends" (featuring Robert Harvey of The Music)	3:37
10.	"ABC"	1:12
11.	"OMG" (featuring Laura Vane of Laura Vane and The Vipertones)	3:27
12.	"Trying to Kill M.E." (featuring Laura Vane)	3:58
13.	"Trust Me"	2:16
14.	"Lock the Locks" (featuring Clare Maguire)	3:08

UK deluxe edition (bonus tracks)
No.	Title	Length
15.	"In the Middle"	2:39
16.	"Lovelight"	2:19

Japan deluxe edition (bonus tracks)
No.	Title	Length
15.	"See If They Salute"	3:13
16.	"In the Middle (Nero Remix)"	6:09
17.	"Going Through Hell (Diplo Remix)"	4:12

== Chart performance ==
On 10 February 2011, Computers and Blues debuted at number 22 on the Irish Albums Chart. On 13 February 2011 the album entered the UK Albums Chart at number 8. As of January 2012 UK sales stand at 42,000 copies according to The Guardian.

Chart (2011)	Peak position
Australian Albums (ARIA)	49
Belgian Albums (Ultratop Flanders)	59
Danish Albums (Hitlisten)	11
French Albums (SNEP)	138
German Albums (Offizielle Top 100)	45
Irish Albums (IRMA)	22
Norwegian Albums (VG-lista)	37
New Zealand Albums (RMNZ)	32
Scottish Albums (OCC)	19
Swiss Albums (Schweizer Hitparade)	18
UK Albums (OCC)	8
UK Dance Albums (OCC)	2

== Release history ==
The album was released in the United Kingdom on 7 February 2011, but was made available to Spotify Premium subscribers on 2 February. A stream of the album was made available by Guardian News and Media on 3 February 2011. For Record Store Day 2026 Computer and Blues was released on vinyl for the first time in support of War Child.

Region	Date	Label	Format
United Kingdom	7 February 2011	Atlantic	CD, Download
Worldwide	18 April 2026	Locked On	Vinyl
