= The Hardest Way to Make an Easy Living =

Studio album by The Streets
- Released: 10 April 2006
- Recorded: October–November 2005
- Genres: Alternative hip-hop, electronic
- Length: 37:18
- Label: Locked On
- Producer: Mike Skinner

The Streets chronology
A Grand Don't Come for Free (2004)	The Hardest Way to Make an Easy Living (2006)	Everything Is Borrowed (2008)

The Hardest Way to Make an Easy Living is the third studio album by The Streets. It was released on 10 April 2006 in the United Kingdom and 25 April 2006 in North America. It is also the shortest Streets album released so far, with a running time of just 37 minutes and 12 seconds. The Mitchell Brothers and Ted Mayhem, two of Skinner's protégés, make guest appearances on the album.

== Content ==
The album deals with the ideas of celebrity and success, partly in relation to Skinner's greater fame after the success of the first two Streets albums. There are several references to recreational drug use.

The final track, "Fake Streets Hats", is about an incident that happened during the 2004 edition of the Dutch Lowlands festival, where a drunk Mike Skinner openly protested against the handing out of white hats with "The Streets" written on them, because he thought they were fake, and thus illegal merchandise. The hats actually were promotional material from his label, Warner. Mike Skinner also sees the song as a personal reflection on plagiarism in general.

== Critical reception ==
Professional ratings
Aggregate scores
Source	Rating
Metacritic	72/100
Review scores
Source	Rating
AllMusic	3/5 stars
The A.V. Club	B−
Entertainment Weekly	A−
NME	8/10
Pitchfork	7.0/10
Q	2/5 stars
Robert Christgau	A
Rolling Stone	3/5 stars
Slant Magazine	3.5/5 stars
Under the Radar	9/10

Critical response for the album was generally positive, scoring 72/100 on Metacritic. However, this score is lower than his previous two albums, scoring 90/100 and 91/100 respectively. In a mixed review, Prefix Magazine said "With about half the tracks on this record falling short, Skinner would seem to be teetering on the edge of irrelevance. But even the failed tracks here sound interesting, and if he's lost his way somewhat thematically, it's all in the name of searching for his new voice." In a much more positive review, The Village Voice Consumer Guide said "His comic timing and mixture of slangs--not to mention his musical conception... are all so much more fully developed that he's actually made a record that's fun to play in the background." Spin named Skinner "the perfect poet for this snooze of a topic." In a negative review, Stylus Magazine described the album as "an exercise in empty nothingness. But it’s not Bacchanalian coked-out excess nothingness, it's the joyless hollow-eyed actions of a man who is waiting for the next fix and doesn't care what bullshit has to come out of his lips in order to get paid."

== Track listing ==
All tracks are written by Mike Skinner

1. "Prangin' Out" – 3:49
2. "War of the Sexes" – 3:26
3. "The Hardest Way to Make an Easy Living" – 3:13
4. "All Goes Out the Window" – 3:32
5. "Memento Mori" – 2:36
6. "Can't Con an Honest John" – 3:40
7. "When You Wasn't Famous" – 3:18
8. "Never Went to Church" – 3:32
9. "Hotel Expressionism" – 3:33
10. "Two Nations" – 3:05
11. "Fake Streets Hats" – 3:12

== Charts ==
=== Weekly charts ===
Chart (2006)	Peak position
Australian Albums (ARIA)	16
Austrian Albums (Ö3 Austria)	42
Belgian Albums (Ultratop Flanders)	19
Belgian Albums (Ultratop Wallonia)	72
Danish Albums (Hitlisten)	9
Dutch Albums (Album Top 100)	70
French Albums (SNEP)	122
German Albums (Offizielle Top 100)	25
Irish Albums (IRMA)	3
New Zealand Albums (RMNZ)	21
Norwegian Albums (VG-lista)	16
Scottish Albums (Official Charts)	1
Swedish Albums (Sverigetopplistan)	19
Swiss Albums (Schweizer Hitparade)	19
UK Albums (Official Charts)	1
US Billboard 200	68
US Top Dance Albums (Billboard)	1
US Independent Albums (Billboard)	3

=== Year-end charts ===
Chart (2006)	Position
UK Albums (OCC)	104
US Top Dance/Electronic Albums (Billboard)	20

== Certifications ==
Region	Certification	Certified units/sales
Ireland (IRMA)	Gold	7,500^{^}
United Kingdom (BPI)	Gold	100,000^{^}
^{^} Shipments figures based on certification alone.
