= A Grand Don't Come for Free =

Studio album by The Streets
- Released: 10 May 2004
- Recorded: 2003–2004 in Stockwell, London
- Genres: Alternative hip-hop, electronica, rap opera
- Length: 50:42
- Labels: Locked On, 679
- Producer: Mike Skinner

The Streets chronology
All Got Our Runnins (2003)	A Grand Don't Come for Free (2004)	The Hardest Way to Make an Easy Living (2006)

Singles from A Grand Don't Come for Free
- 1. "Fit But You Know It" Released: 26 April 2004; 2. "Dry Your Eyes" Released: 19 July 2004; 3. "Blinded by the Lights" Released: 27 September 2004; 4. "Could Well Be In" Released: 29 November 2004

A Grand Don't Come for Free is the second studio album by English rapper and producer Mike Skinner, under the music project the Streets. It was released on 10 May 2004 and is listed in the book 1001 Albums You Must Hear Before You Die. It is a rap opera and concept album that follows the story of its protagonist's relationship with a girl named Simone, alongside the mysterious loss of £1,000 from his home (the eponymous "grand").

== Plot ==
In the story, the protagonist loses £1,000, or a "grand" in slang terms, and strives to recoup the money.

In his book The Story of the Streets, Skinner explained his decision to create a story that ran through the album:

"The reason I decided to write A Grand Don't Come for Free as episodes from a single unfolding narrative was because I'd got so into my songwriting manuals and books by Hollywood screen-writing gurus – not just Robert McKee but Syd Field and John Truby as well – and I wanted to try and put what I'd learnt from them into practice. Every song needs a drama at the centre of it, and once you have the drama, the song writes itself – that's what I firmly believed, and still do believe. I'm not alone in this conviction, either. It's something pretty much all rappers seem to be sure about."

In the first track on the album, "It Was Supposed to Be So Easy", Skinner attempts several tasks during a day, but they do not go according to plan – he mistakenly leaves a DVD he'd rented behind while taking its empty box to return it, tries to withdraw money only to find he has insufficient funds, and is unable to call his mother due to his phone's battery running out. When he comes home he cannot find the £1,000 he has saved and his television is broken. In the process of trying to recover the money he:

- Starts seeing a girl called Simone who works in JD Sports with his friend Dan. ("Could Well Be In")
- Tries to recover the £1,000 by gambling on football. After a series of wins, he frustratingly cannot get to the bookmakers in time to make a big gamble. Fortuitously, the prediction is wrong — it is his lucky day. ("Not Addicted")
- Is stood up at a nightclub by Simone, so he passes the time drinking alcohol and taking ecstasy. He thinks he sees Simone kissing Dan but the drug-induced high distracts him before he can think about it properly. ("Blinded By the Lights")
- Moves into Simone's house and finds himself comfortable smoking marijuana there, rather than drinking with his friends at the pub. ("Wouldn't Have It Any Other Way")
- Argues with Simone and gets kicked out of her house. ("Get Out of My House")
- Poses to impress a girl in a take away restaurant during a heavy night drinking on holiday. ("Fit But You Know It")
- Flies back from the holiday and remorsefully reviews the events of the previous night during a phone call to a friend, realising he still wants to be with Simone. ("Such a Twat")
- Suspects his mate Scott of stealing his coat, money, and girlfriend but discovers that Simone is actually having an affair with Dan. ("What is He Thinking?")
- Tries to cope with his girlfriend breaking up with him. ("Dry Your Eyes")
- Deals with the events of his life in one of two ways; the final track, "Empty Cans", features two endings to the plot, a bitter ending and a happy ending (the former where he and a TV repairman get into a fight over the repairman's fee, and the latter in which he reconciles with his mates and finds the £1,000 had fallen down the back of the TV, making it malfunction).
- The B-side of the UK single release of "Fit But You Know It" is the song "Soaked by the Ale". The story of this song takes place between the events of "Fit But You Know It" and "Such a Twat". It documents one of Skinner's mates being annoyed at Mike for stealing a tub of ice cream whilst on holiday in Spain as a result of his excessive drinking. The chronological order is identified in "Such a Twat" where Skinner raps "And that incident with the ice cream I forgot, it all ended in our vodka".

Like the Streets' debut album, Original Pirate Material, the album was recorded in a flat in south London, but this time in Skinner's own flat in Stockwell which he had bought using the money he had received upon signing his publishing deal.

== Artwork ==
The front cover of the album features Skinner posing in a bus shelter at night, taken by British photographer Ewen Spencer.

== Singles ==
The first single from the album, "Fit But You Know It" reached number four on the UK Singles Charts with the second single, "Dry Your Eyes" entering the UK Charts at number one. The album itself reached number one in the UK Album Charts, number eleven in Australia and number eighty-two in the United States.

- "Fit But You Know It" Released: 3 May 2004 No. 4 UK
- "Dry Your Eyes" Released: 26 July 2004 No. 1 UK
- "Blinded by the Lights" Released: 4 October 2004 No. 10 UK
- "Could Well Be In" Released: 6 December 2004 No. 30 UK

== Critical reception ==
Professional ratings
Aggregate scores
Source	Rating
Metacritic	91/100
Review scores
Source	Rating
AllMusic	4.5/5 stars
Blender	4/5 stars
Entertainment Weekly	B
The Guardian	5/5 stars
Los Angeles Times	3.5/4 stars
NME	9/10
Pitchfork	9.1/10
Q	5/5 stars
Rolling Stone	3/5 stars
The Village Voice	B+

Critical response for the album, like for his previous album, was near universally positive. It currently scores 91/100 on Metacritic, slightly higher than his previous album, which scored 90/100.

Critics noted the difference in style compared to Skinner's debut album. In Q, Garry Mulholland said that instead of thinking of the record as a concept album, it was more like "a spoken-word opera, or a short story with an exquisitely crafted pop soundtrack". Calling it "the best album of 2004 so far, and by some distance", Mulholland concluded that "if [Skinner] sees a darkness in the private hell of the everyday, it's an inspiring one", and that the album "puts forth a musical argument that our own lives are more important and relevant than the aspirational celebrity imagery that dominates 21st century pop." The Guardian said that the album "raises the stakes to such an extent that it sounds literally unprecedented: there isn't really any other album like this", and PopMatters stated that Skinner "is now in a class all his own; nobody else is making music like this." Trouser Press said that "Skinner seems both edgier and more contemplative".

Pat Blashill of Rolling Stone called A Grand Don't Come for Free "the best British hip-hop concept album ever" and stated that "it is both simpler – in sound and scope – than Pirate and more ambitious". He was impressed by Skinner's ability with "tickling and tearing vowels, adverbs and lexicons", but, above all, "his real gift is literary". He concluded that the story was "thoroughly mundane ... yet Skinner's ear for language and detail keeps it vivid, and hilarious". "In a previous decade, A Grand Don't Come for Free would have been a rock opera, and it would have taken itself very seriously," observed Blender. "But Skinner isn't interested in pinball wizards or ancient alien races ... [It] demands the same attention as a movie, and that's why some people will hate it while others will find it uniquely riveting." The Austin Chronicle named the album "the first hip-hop classic of the new millennium."

Online music magazine Pitchfork placed A Grand Don't Come for Free at number 129 on their list of top 200 albums of the 2000s. Music magazine NME placed the album at number 16 on their list of "top 50 albums of the noughties".

== Track listing ==
All tracks are written by Mike Skinner.

No.	Title	Length
1.	"It Was Supposed to Be So Easy"	3:56
2.	"Could Well Be In"	4:24
3.	"Not Addicted"	3:40
4.	"Blinded by the Lights"	4:45
5.	"Wouldn't Have It Any Other Way"	4:36
6.	"Get Out of My House" (featuring MC C-Mone)	3:52
7.	"Fit but You Know It"	4:14
8.	"Such a Twat"	3:48
9.	"What Is He Thinking?" (featuring Wayney G)	4:41
10.	"Dry Your Eyes"	4:31
11.	"Empty Cans"	8:15

== Charts ==
=== Weekly charts ===
Chart (2004)	Peak position
Australian Albums (ARIA)	11
Austrian Albums (Ö3 Austria)	24
Belgian Albums (Ultratop Flanders)	22
Belgian Albums (Ultratop Wallonia)	43
Danish Albums (Hitlisten)	4
Dutch Albums (Album Top 100)	45
Finnish Albums (Suomen virallinen lista)	18
French Albums (SNEP)	38
German Albums (Offizielle Top 100)	25
Irish Albums (IRMA)	1
New Zealand Albums (RMNZ)	7
Norwegian Albums (VG-lista)	5
Scottish Albums (Official Charts)	2
Swedish Albums (Sverigetopplistan)	9
Swiss Albums (Schweizer Hitparade)	34
UK Albums (Official Charts)	1
UK Independent Albums (Official Charts)	28
UK R&B Albums (Official Charts)	1
US Billboard 200	82
US Top Dance Albums (Billboard)	1
US Independent Albums (Billboard)	1
US Top R&B/Hip-Hop Albums (Billboard)	59

=== Year-end charts ===
Chart (2004)	Position
Australian Albums (ARIA)	100
Belgian Albums (Ultratop Flanders)	71
UK Albums (OCC)	13

Chart (2005)	Position
UK Albums (OCC)	180

== Certifications ==
Region	Certification	Certified units/sales
Australia (ARIA)	Gold	35,000^{^}
Denmark (IFPI Danmark)	Gold	20,000^{^}
New Zealand (RMNZ)	Gold	7,500^{^}
Sweden (GLF)	Gold	30,000^{^}
United Kingdom (BPI)	4× Platinum	1,200,000^{‡}
Summaries
Europe (IFPI)	Platinum	1,000,000^{*}
^{*} Sales figures based on certification alone.^{^} Shipments figures based on certification alone.^{‡} Sales+streaming figures based on certification alone.

== Bibliography ==
- Skinner, Mike (2012). The Story of The Streets. London, England: Bantam Press. ISBN 978-0-5930-6807-6.
