= The Darker the Shadow the Brighter the Light =

Studio album by The Streets
- Released: 13 October 2023
- Length: 43:54
- Label: 679; Warner Music UK
- Producer: Mike Skinner

The Streets chronology
Brexit at Tiffany's (2022)	The Darker the Shadow the Brighter the Light (2023)

Singles from The Darker the Shadow the Brighter the Light
- 1. "Troubled Waters" Released: 12 July 2023; 2. "Too Much Yayo" Released: 18 August 2023

The Darker the Shadow the Brighter the Light is the sixth album by English rapper and producer Mike Skinner, under his music project The Streets. It was released on 13 October 2023 through 679 and Warner Music UK.

== Background ==
Skinner announced the 15-track album on 12 July and shared a first song titled "Troubled Waters", which was described as "a dynamically-paced cut" that showcases "deft lyricism" on top of drum and bass beats. Considered a "classic Streets album", it is set to feature contributions by Kevin Mark Trail, Robert Harvey and Teef. A film of the same name will be released alongside the album, dubbed a "tripped out noir murder mystery based in Londons' clubland". He will embark on a tour through the United Kingdom in fall 2023.

Skinner first talked about the project in 2018. Back then he revealed that work on the album and film took "seven long years". After a few first attempts with shorts and music videos, he felt ready to make a film. Initially, he tried a "traditional" approach but soon realised to follow his instincts. As a matter of fact, Skinner took it upon himself to fund, write, direct, act, edit, mix and produce both projects all by himself. He further opined that both projects could not exist without each other, as the album works as a soundtrack and, at times, narrator of the film. In summary, Skinner described The Darker the Shadow the Brighter the Light as "all the fruits of a decade on the DJ circuit", impressions of people in clubs and back rooms, as well as "testing out beats and basslines to see what connected".

== Critical reception ==
Professional ratings
Aggregate scores
Source	Rating
AnyDecentMusic?	6.8/10
Metacritic	74/100
Review scores
Source	Rating
AllMusic	4/5 stars
The Arts Desk	4/5 stars
DIY	4/5 stars
The Line of Best Fit	6/10
Mojo	4/5 stars
MusicOMH	2.5/5 stars
NME	3/5 stars
Pitchfork	6.0/10
Record Collector	3/5 stars
Uncut	8/10

The Darker the Shadow the Brighter the Light received a score of 74 out of 100 on review aggregator Metacritic based on eight critics' reviews, indicating "generally favorable" reception. Joe Goggins of DIY concluded that while "there's the occasional lapse into self-parody, for the most part, [the album] has a vitality to it that was perhaps lacking by the time he wound down The Streets the first time around". Kathryn Reilly of The Arts Desk wrote that the "production is odd – as if he's grasping at an analogue vibe, with the lyrics turned up as high as ever. But if you liked the old stuff, you'll like this. Inevitably there's less bravado, less fire but the majority of it satisfies".

== Track listing ==
All tracks are written by Mike Skinner, except "The Darker the Shadow the Brighter the Light" written by Skinner and Virginia Liston.

The Darker the Shadow the Brighter the Light track listing
No.	Title	Length
1.	"Too Much Yayo"	3:41
2.	"Money Isn't Everything" (featuring Teef)	2:56
3.	"Walk of Shame"	2:56
4.	"Something to Hide"	3:13
5.	"Shake Hands with Shadows"	3:26
6.	"Not a Good Idea"	3:25
7.	"Bright Sunny Day"	3:20
8.	"The Darker the Shadow the Brighter the Light"	2:40
9.	"Funny Dream"	2:56
10.	"Gonna Hurt When This Is Over"	2:58
11.	"Kick the Can"	2:10
12.	"Each Day Gives"	3:24
13.	"Someone Else's Tune"	3:10
14.	"Troubled Waters"	3:54
15.	"Good Old Daze"	3:10
Total length:		47:22

== Personnel ==
- Mike Skinner – vocals, production, mixing, mastering
- Kevin Mark Trail – vocals (tracks 1, 2, 4, 11, 12, 14, 15)
- Robert Harvey – vocals (7, 10)
- Laura Vane – vocals (9)
- Luke Pickering – engineering (2)

== Charts ==
Chart performance for The Darker the Shadow the Brighter the Light
Chart (2023)	Peak position
Australian Digital Albums (ARIA)	4
German Albums (Offizielle Top 100)	57
Hungarian Physical Albums (MAHASZ)	16
Scottish Albums (OCC)	7
UK Albums (OCC)	7
UK R&B Albums (OCC)	2
