= The Last Dance (song) =

Single by Clare Maguire

from the album Light After Dark
- Released: 20 February 2011
- Genre: Pop, electropop
- Length: 3:34
- Label: Polydor Records
- Songwriter(s): Clare Maguire, Fraser T Smith

Clare Maguire singles chronology
"Ain't Nobody" (2010)	"The Last Dance" (2011)	"The Shield and the Sword" (2011)

"The Last Dance" is the second single by English singer-songwriter Clare Maguire, released from her debut album, Light After Dark. It was released in the United Kingdom on 20 February 2011 through Polydor Records.

== Music video ==
A music video was made for the single and was uploaded to YouTube on 8 January 2011. The music video was directed by Alex & Liane.

== Critical reception ==
Nick Levine of Digital Spy gave the song a four star rating, and said:

There's an unmistakable whiff of Fleetwood Mac - incense mixed with champers and crack? - to this second single from Clare Maguire. It's there in the passionately romantic but utterly relatable lyrics, it's there in the soaring, sing-along-soon-as-you-hear-it chorus, and it's there in the twinkly keyboard sounds that could almost have been nicked from the Tango In The Night studio tapes.

But this is The Mac pimped up for the teenies, with Maguire's mighty vocals - so committed and filled with sincerity, she'd sell you a papier-mâché pac-a-mac were she (literally) to sing its praises - shrouded by a bombastic but glittery production from Fraser T Smith. The result conjures up images of a muscular drag queen giving great Stevie Nicks in a Soho cocktail joint - the track, that is, not Maguire, who is actually very attractive as well as very talented..

== Track listing ==
Digital download
No.	Title	Writer(s)	Length
1.	"The Last Dance"	Clare Maguire, Fraser T Smith	3:34
2.	"The Last Dance" (Chase & Status Remix)		3:26
3.	"The Last Dance" (Kris Menace Remix)		5:46
4.	"The Last Dance" (Danny Byrd Remix)		5:29
5.	"The Last Dance" (The Neon Lights Remix)		3:15

CD single
No.	Title	Writer(s)	Length
1.	"The Last Dance"	Clare Maguire, Fraser T Smith	3:34
2.	"The Last Dance" (Chase & Status Remix)		3:26
3.	"The Last Dance" (Kris Menace Remix)		5:46
4.	"The Last Dance" (Danny Byrd Remix)		5:29

== Charts ==
Chart (2011)	Peak position
Belgium (Ultratip Bubbling Under Wallonia)	39
Denmark Airplay (Tracklisten)	3
Scotland (OCC)	12
UK Singles (OCC)	23

== Release history ==
Region	Date	Format	Label
United Kingdom	20 February 2011	Digital download	Polydor Records
United States	22 February 2011	Digital download	Universal Republic
