= When You Wasn't Famous =

Single by The Streets

from the album The Hardest Way to Make an Easy Living
- Released: 30 March 2006
- Genre: Hip hop
- Length: 3:18
- Label: 679
- Songwriter(s): Mike Skinner
- Producer(s): Mike Skinner

The Streets singles chronology
"Could Well Be In" (2004)	"When You Wasn't Famous" (2006)	"Never Went to Church" (2006)

"When You Wasn't Famous" is a single by English rapper and producer Mike Skinner under the music project The Streets. It is the first single from their third studio album, The Hardest Way to Make an Easy Living. Released on 30 March 2006, it went straight to number 8 in the UK and number 26 in Ireland. The song's chorus is about how Skinner finds it easier to have sexual relations with non-famous women now that he's famous, but how things are just like they used to be when attempts to sleep with a similarly famous woman.

== Content ==
The song's verses recount Skinner's unsuccessful attempt to seduce a female pop star. The lyrics are purportedly autobiographical, but Skinner has never confirmed the identity of the pop star (who at one point is described "smok[ing] crack") in question. He has, however, categorically denied rumours that it is Cheryl Cole or Rachel Stevens. The song contains the lyric "Considering the amount of prang you've done, you looked amazing on CD:UK" and a reference to MTV's children's appeal.

The reference to the television show CD:UK in the song is quite notable because the show was axed just two days after "When You Wasn't Famous"' was released.

== Music video ==
The video features Mike Skinner as a patient at a celebrity detox clinic, trying to avoid exposure by the paparazzi. An alternative video was made featuring a remix of the song by Professor Green. The original video was released on the DVD for the 2007 Brit Awards whilst the Professor Green remixed version was included on the DVD single for the following release Never Went to Church.

== Charts ==
Chart performance for "When You Wasn't Famous"
Chart (2006)	Peak position
Australia (ARIA)	67
Austria (Ö3 Austria Top 40)	74
Belgium (Ultratip Bubbling Under Flanders)	4
Ireland (IRMA)	26
Scotland (OCC)	7
Sweden (Sverigetopplistan)	60
UK Singles (OCC)	8
UK Hip Hop/R&B (OCC)	3
