= Everything Is Borrowed =

Studio album by the Streets
- Released: 15 September 2008
- Length: 38:49
- Label: 679; Vice
- Producer: Mike Skinner

The Streets chronology
The Hardest Way to Make an Easy Living (2006)	Everything Is Borrowed (2008)	Cyberspace and Reds (2011)

Everything Is Borrowed is the fourth studio album by English rapper and producer Mike Skinner, under the music project the Streets. Released in the United Kingdom on 15 September 2008, and in the United States on 7 October 2008, Skinner describes the album as a "peaceful coming to terms album" and as containing "peaceful positive vibes" which stand in stark contrast to the previous album, The Hardest Way to Make an Easy Living, which Skinner has described as a "guilt-ridden indulgence".

The album's eponymous first single, was released on 29 September 2008. In the months leading up to the album's release, "The Escapist" was offered online as a free download, accompanied by a music video. The video (directed by Ted Mayhem) follows Skinner as he walks 770 miles from Dover to a beach in France, a feat Skinner actually undertook. "Who Knows Who", a track Skinner recorded with the band Muse, was leaked in August 2008 and was initially believed by many to be a track from the upcoming album, until refuted by Muse.

During the recording of the album, Skinner states that he "threw away more music than is on the album now," as he was unhappy with the material recorded, but that "the album is a product of all the stuff I threw away, it was important to the album." Everything Is Borrowed is the penultimate album from the Streets; Skinner has said that he signed a five-record deal, and that he always envisioned a five-album box set. Eight music videos were made for the album, culminating with "On the Edge of a Cliff" being released on 7 April 2009 (videos were not made for "The Sherry End", "Alleged Legends" and "The Strongest Person I Know"). "On the Flip of a Coin" was used in the 2018/19 video game Life Is Strange 2.

Professional ratings
Aggregate scores
Source	Rating
Metacritic	63/100
Review scores
Source	Rating
AllMusic	4/5 stars
Alternative Press	4/5 stars
Entertainment Weekly	A−
The Guardian	4/5 stars
The Independent	4/5 stars
MusicOMH	4/5 stars
NME	8/10
Pitchfork	4.8/10
Rolling Stone	3.5/5 stars
Spin	8/10

== Track listing ==
All tracks are written by Mike Skinner, except for 9 written by Skinner and Tim Vigon.

1. "Everything Is Borrowed" – 4:04
2. "Heaven for the Weather" – 3:27
3. "I Love You More (Than You Like Me)" – 3:45
4. "The Way of the Dodo" – 3:33
5. "On the Flip of a Coin" – 3:21
6. "On the Edge of a Cliff" – 3:04
7. "Never Give In" – 3:25
8. "The Sherry End" – 2:46
9. "Alleged Legends" – 3:12
10. "The Strongest Person I Know" – 3:03
11. "The Escapist" – 5:16
12. "To Your Face" (iTunes bonus track) – 3:35

== Personnel ==
=== The Streets ===
- Mike Skinner – vocals, guitar (tracks 2, 4, 7), xylophone (track 2), bass (track 4), drums (track 4), keyboards (tracks 4, 7), bells (track 11)
- Johnny "Drummachine" Jenkins – bass (tracks 1, 7), drums (tracks 1, 2, 3, 5, 6, 7, 9, 11), percussion (tracks 1, 2, 3, 5, 6, 9, 11), glockenspiel (track 1), acoustic guitar (tracks 1, 5, 6), piano (track 2), vocals (track 6), electric guitar (tracks 10, 11), recorder (track 10), triangle (track 10), xylophone (track 10)
- Kevin Mark Trail – vocals (track 11)
- Wayne Bennett – bass (tracks 5, 6), electric guitar (tracks 5, 6)
- Chris Brown – keyboards (track 2), hammond organ (tracks 2, 6, 9), rhodes (track 5), accordion (tracks 5, 9), wurlitzer (track 6)
- Eddie Jenkins – rhodes (track 3), piano (tracks 3, 6, 10)
- Laura Vane – vocals (tracks 1, 5, 6, 10)

=== Additional musicians ===
- Dirty Pretty Strings – string quartet (tracks 1, 11)
- Andy Love – vocals (track 1)
- Barnet Philharmonic Choir – backing vocals (track 2)
- Bob Dowell – piano (track 2)
- Richard Wayler – vocals (track 2)
- Nick Marshall – guitar (track 2), double bass (track 3), acoustic guitar (track 10)
- Camilla Pay – harp (tracks 3, 5, 6, 10)
- Chris Williams – flute (tracks 3, 9), whistle (track 3)
- Teddy Mitchell – backing vocals (tracks 3, 5), whistle (track 3)
- Gita Harcourt – violin (tracks 5, 6, 9)
- David Gino Jenkins – vocals (track 6)
- Jake Painter – trumpet (tracks 6, 9)
- Maria Payne – clarinet (tracks 6, 9, 10)
- Ed Harcourt – banjo (track 9), mandolin (track 10)

== Charts ==
Chart performance for Everything Is Borrowed
Chart (2008)	Peak position
Australian Albums (ARIA)	55
Austrian Albums (Ö3 Austria)	64
Belgian Albums (Ultratop Flanders)	28
Danish Albums (Hitlisten)	9
French Albums (SNEP)	99
German Albums (Offizielle Top 100)	58
Irish Albums (IRMA)	19
Swiss Albums (Schweizer Hitparade)	19
UK Albums (OCC)	7
US Billboard 200	154

== Certifications ==
Certifications and sales for Everything Is Borrowed
Region	Certification	Certified units/sales
United Kingdom (BPI)	Gold	100,000^{‡}
^{‡} Sales+streaming figures based on certification alone.
