= Clare Maguire =

English singer, songwriter, and actor (born 1988)

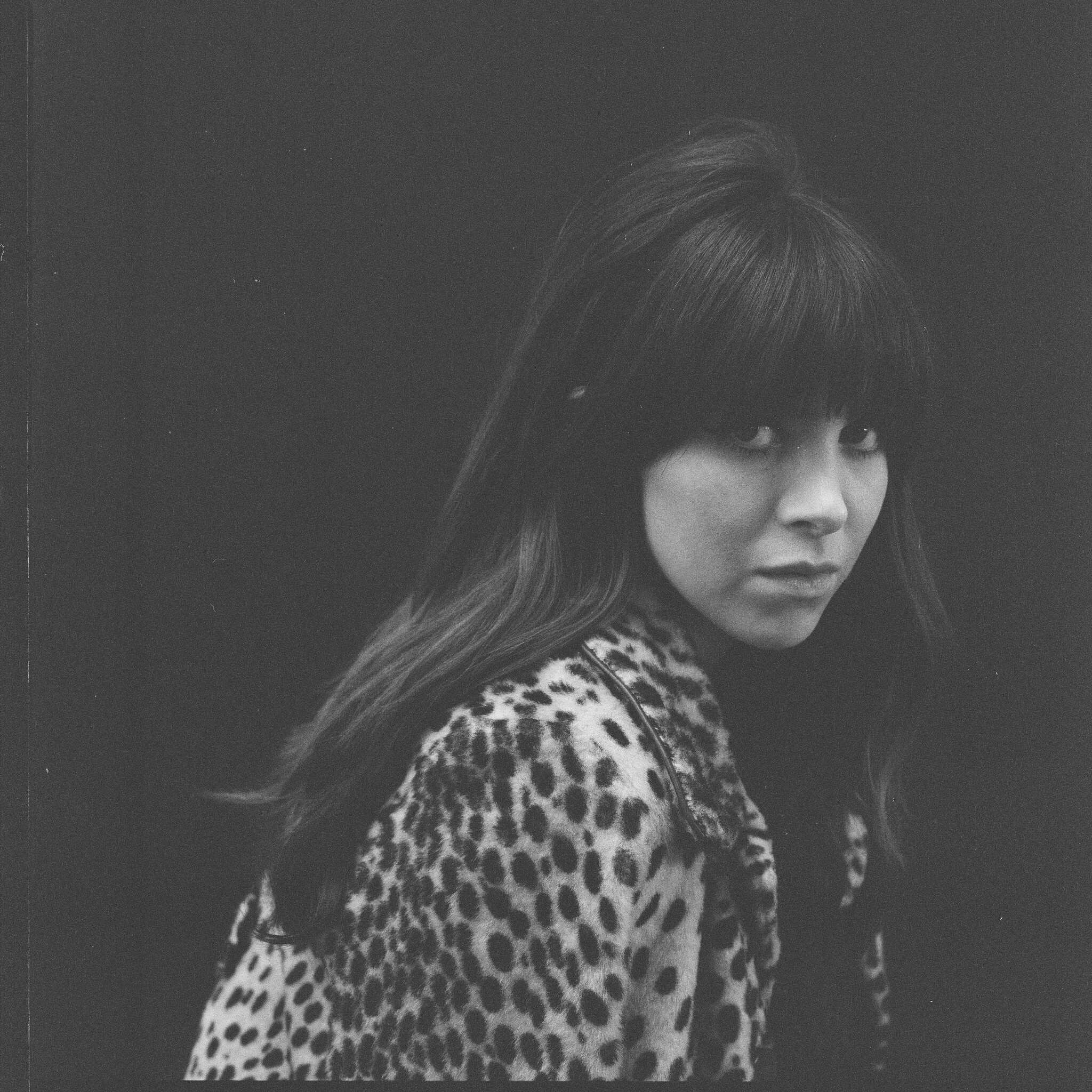
- Maguire in 2015
- Born: 15 September 1988 (age 38); Solihull, West Midlands, England
- Occupations: Musician, singer, songwriter
- Years active: 2008–present
- Musical career
- Genres: Pop; soul; jazz; blues; electropop
- Instruments: Vocals, guitar, bass, piano, violin, autoharp
- Label: Polydor, Republic, Virgin Records
- Website: www.clares.club

Clare Rita Mary Maguire (born 15 September 1988) is an English singer-songwriter. She was signed to Universal Music Group, Polydor Records in 2009. She was rated in fifth place in the BBC Sound of 2011 list of the top 15 most promising new artists. Maguire was also singled out as one of MTV's Brand New: For 2011 Acts. Her voice has been compared to Stevie Nicks and Annie Lennox. Maguire's debut album, Light After Dark, was released on 25 February 2011 peaking at number seven in the Official UK Top 40, and achieving the BPI Silver Sales Award in the UK.

In 2016, she announced the forthcoming release of her second album Stranger Things Have Happened on 27 May with the song "Elizabeth Taylor". The album was released on Virgin Records.

== Career beginnings ==
When she was 17, Maguire began posting demo songs on MySpace. One of these tracks, "Strangest Thing", recorded with Joe Flory (Primary 1) reached 1,000,000 plays, leading to interest from a number of major recording companies, and came to the attention of some of her favourite musical figures, most notably, Rick Rubin, who introduced her to Leonard Cohen in LA. And in London, Jarvis Cocker, who was impressed offered her one of his songs. Maguire signed a recording contract with Polydor Records in 2009 and was persuaded to abandon her musical roots of folk and blues by her label A&R, culminating in working on her debut album Light After Dark with producer Fraser T Smith, who has previously worked with Kylie Minogue and Adele.

== Career ==
=== 2009–11: Light After Dark, commercial success and touring ===
Maguire began a European concert tour in October 2010 supporting Plan B and Hurts. She has also written a song with fellow Birmingham rap artist Mike Skinner titled "Lock the Locks" which features on his last Streets album, Computers and Blues. Maguire also features on the track "Midnight Caller" which appears on Drum and Bass-duo Chase & Status' second studio album, No More Idols.

Maguire released her debut single "Ain't Nobody" in the United Kingdom on 18 October 2010 through Polydor Records. A Breakage remix of the song was used in Renault's 2011 Clio commercial titled "What is Va Va Voom?".

In the summer of 2010, she performed on Saturday at the Latitude Festival.

She then released her second official single, "The Last Dance". The single was said to have been written by Maguire the day after the death of music legend Michael Jackson in response to a series of unjustified comments on his legacy. The song was 4Music and TheBox's 'VIP Track of the week' and was also 'Record Of The Week' for BBC Radio 1 DJs Fearne Cotton and Dev. BBC Radio 1 added the song to the B-List on its playlist.

Light After Dark went in at Number 7 in the official UK top 100 album chart and achieved BPI Silver Sales status in the UK, meaning sales over 60,000.

On 27 March, Mike Skinner of The Streets revealed in a blog post he has been working with Maguire in the studios for "the past couple of days" and that they were hoping to release a hip hop blues album, if Maguire's label allowed her to. Maguire had earlier in 2012 worked with Skinner in his new music project, The D.O.T. by featuring on a track titled "You Never Asked". The rap provided on the track was written and performed by rapper, Danny Brown.

On 10 June 2013, Maguire announced on Twitter that she was in the studio recording. She had been working in a studio called 'Studio XXVII' belonging to Dave Johnson, a friend of Maguire's, Alexander Burnett and Blue May. She has previously been seen in pictures in Johnson's studio recording material.

On 25 July 2013, the previously promised song was released to Maguire's personal SoundCloud account. "Paper Thin" is a song with heavy blues and jazz influences. The track was recorded at the previously mentioned 'Studio XXVII’ and produced by Blue May. It was voted Best Song of Week on Radio 1's review show.

Maguire stated that 'more tracks' would follow, and a series of stripped back songs appeared, which were collated onto a free mixtape she gave away on her website.

Following this SoundCloud trend of testing new songs Clare released another track on 7 October 2013. This was a cover version of Ella Fitzgerald's "Black Coffee". It was premiered on Maguire's personal SoundCloud account and featured an instrumental with her returning dark and deep chesty vocals. An interview was also published with this track by The Fader. In Maguire's first interview in 2 years, she speaks of how her mentoring and attendance to rehabilitation helped craft her music writing abilities stating "You can’t lie in there. You have to say it how it is."

13 January 2014 saw the release of the much anticipated, self-titled EP, Clare Maguire – The EP consisted of four previously released SoundCloud songs, "Paper Thin", a cover of "Black Coffee", "Whenever You Want It" and a cover of "The Last Time I Saw Richard". It was Maguire's first purchaseable material since the release of her third single from her debut album. Following the release of the EP, Maguire also released the aforementioned Mixtape containing 9 songs – 7 of which were previously released on her personal SoundCloud account. The two new songs were a cover of Nina Simone's "Lilac Wine" and a new production "In The Night".

Having previously been known to be working with her friend High Contrast, Friday 18 July saw the surprise release of a collaboration between Maguire and High Contrast. "Who's Loving You" (Part 2) was played on Annie Mac's live BBC Radio 1 show at 8pm, and was made the "Special Delivery" of the show. The song is the second and more experimental remix half of a single to be released, while "Who's Loving You (Part 1)" is a full track, dropping the majority of the drum and bass sound that Part 2 boasts. In the interview section of the BBC Radio 1 stream, High Contrast commented that Maguire is exactly like "The female Johnny Cash", Cash being one of Maguire's biggest influences.

=== 2015–2021: Don't Mess Me Around EP and Stranger Things Have Happened ===
In February, she had a live performance of 'Shadow' at the Burberry Prorsum A/W catwalk show. Maguire released her sixth EP, Don't Mess Me Around, on 23 February 2015.

On 24 March 2016, Maguire released the lead single, "Elizabeth Taylor", from her second studio album, Stranger Things Have Happened, released on 27 May 2016. The album features songs both previously heard before and new additions to the blues vibe that the album encompasses. On 9 February 2018, Maguire released the single "All or Nothing Love".

On 26 March 2021 Will Young confirmed he would be covering one of Maguires songs following the announcement of the release of his eighth studio album Crying on the Bathroom Floor. Following the release, Young said: "I loved the idea of creating an album that celebrates some of the modern female artists I so admire in pop. In today's times it's so much easier and accepted to occupy other genders, ideas and explore new avenues. I wanted to understand what it might be like to sing their lyrics. A song about a boy called Daniel; crying on the bathroom floor, feeling like Elizabeth Taylor. This is not a covers album as such, well certainly not in the standard way. I wanted to bring songs from female artists who I admire into a new arena."

On 19 May 2021 Maguire confirmed the release of Light After Dark on vinyl for the first time ever to celebrate the album's ten year anniversary.

== Discography ==
- Light After Dark (2011)
- Stranger Things Have Happened (2016)

== Tours ==
=== Headlining ===
- Light After Dark Tour (2011)

=== Supporting act ===
- Plan B – The Defamation of Strickland Banks Tour (2010)
- Hurts – Happiness Tour (2010-2011)
- The Script – Science & Faith Tour (2011)

== Awards and nominations ==
Year	Organisation	Nominated work	Award	Result
2010	BBC Sound of 2011	Clare Maguire	Sound of 2011	Fifth
2010	MTV Brand New	Clare Maguire	New for 2011	Nominated
2010	Q Awards	Clare Maguire	Next Big Thing	Won
2011	Glamour Women Of The Year Awards	Clare Maguire	UK Solo Artist/Musician	Nominated
2011	Glamour Women Of The Year Awards	Clare Maguire	PANDORA Breakthrough Artist	Nominated
