= Stranger Things Have Happened (Clare Maguire album) =

Studio album by Clare Maguire
- Released: 27 May 2016
- Recorded: 2014–2015
- Genre: Pop, jazz, blues
- Length: 45:10
- Label: Virgin Records
- Producer: Clare Maguire

Clare Maguire chronology
Light After Dark (2011)	Stranger Things Have Happened (2016)

Singles from Stranger Things Have Happened
- 1. "Elizabeth Taylor" Released: 23 March 2016; 2. "The Valley" Released: 22 April 2016

Professional ratings
Review scores
Source	Rating
The Guardian	3/5 stars
The Up Coming	4/5 stars

Stranger Things Have Happened is the second studio album by British singer-songwriter Clare Maguire, released on 27 May 2016 by Virgin Records.

== Track listing ==
No.	Title	Writer(s)	Length
1.	"Faded"	Maguire, Sam Beste, Blue May	3:35
2.	"Here I Am"	Maguire, Tom Wright-Goss	3:10
3.	"Elizabeth Taylor"	Maguire, Lincoln Barrett	4:27
4.	"Swimming"	Maguire, Wright-Goss	3:23
5.	"Stranger Things Have Happened"	Maguire, Beste, May	5:22
6.	"Whenever You Want It"	Maguire, Beste, May	3:56
7.	"The Valley"	Maguire, James Norton, Timucin Aluo	3:44
8.	"Hanging in the Stars"	Maguire, Wright-Goss	3:33
9.	"Falling Leaves"	Maguire	3:05
10.	"Changing Faces"	Maguire, Beste, May	3:20
11.	"Spaceman"	Maguire, May	3:54
12.	"Leave You in Yesterday"	Maguire, Beste	3:33

== Charts ==
Chart (2016)	Peak position
UK Albums Chart	85
