= Light After Dark =

Studio album by Clare Maguire
- Released: 28 February 2011
- Recorded: 2008–2010
- Genres: Pop; electropop; soul
- Length: 45:15
- Label: Polydor
- Producers: Fraser T Smith; Starsmith; Crada

Clare Maguire chronology
Light After Dark (2011)	Stranger Things Have Happened (2016)

Singles from Light After Dark
- 1. "Ain't Nobody" Released: 17 October 2010; 2. "The Last Dance" Released: 20 February 2011; 3. "The Shield and the Sword" Released: 9 May 2011

Light After Dark is the debut album by British singer-songwriter Clare Maguire which went in at number 7 in the UK Albums Chart. "Ain't Nobody" was released as the first single from the album on 18 October 2010, followed by "The Last Dance", which was released on 20 February 2011. "The Shield and the Sword" was released as the third and final single to be released from the album on 9 May 2011. All three of the released singles have accompanying music videos, featured on Maguire's YouTube VEVO account, each produced and directed by their own respected creators.

== Composition ==
For Light After Dark, Maguire wrote all the tracks in collaboration with Fraser T Smith, who also produced all tracks on the album, with the exception of "Freedom", which was produced by German producer Crada and songwriting team Paralle, and the iTunes pre-order track "Burn", which was produced by Starsmith. Maguire has stated in interviews that she felt it was extremely important that the strings and drums in her songs were all recorded live, and this was a big element of her first album.

== Artwork ==
The artwork premiered on Maguire's Facebook page on 7 February 2011. She announced the artwork was shot by photographer Aitken Jolly. It features a facial shot of Maguire, looking into the camera while placing her hair behind her ear. The title of the album is laid in white text on Maguire's hair, giving a contrast of the jet black hair and the white font.

== Critical reception ==
Professional ratings
Review scores
Source	Rating
BBC Music	(negative)
The Daily Telegraph	3/5 stars
Drowned in Sound	(3/10)
Evening Standard	3/5 stars
The Guardian	2/5 stars
The Independent	2/5 stars
The Irish Times	4/5 stars
NME	(2/10)
The Observer	(mixed)
Q Magazine	4/5 stars
So So Gay	5/5 stars
Yahoo! Music	(5/10)
MuuMuse	(4.5/5)

Light After Dark received generally mixed reviews from music critics. At Metacritic the album received an average score of 50 out of 100 based on 12 critical reviews, indicating "mixed or average reviews", while Aggregating website AnyDecentMusic? reports a score of 4.7 based on fifteen professional reviews. John Aizlewood, writing for Q magazine, compliments Clare's vocals on the album, believing them to be "a rich, deep, anguished rumble, hewn from the very depths of her stomach", and notes the album is "not short of songs" either. Bryan Boyd of The Irish Times noticed that Maguire "eschews r'n’b tics and hip-hop inflections to marry a classic 1960s Dusty-style vocal with modern studio trimmings" and felt that the album "is coming down with elegance, style and promise". Andrew Perry, of The Daily Telegraph wrote that "contrary to the advance hype, Maguire [...] is hardly the new Kate Bush, rather a flat-out belter of the Adele/Florence school, surrounded variously by daft orchestral sturm-und-drang and flimsy ProTools disco/house", and awarded the album three out of five stars. David Smyth of the Evening Standard wrote that Maguire's "sound is grandiose, ever-so-slightly Gothic and frequently overwrought" and noticed that "she's in possession of a few fine pop tunes", but "the spectre of Susan Boyle rears its head when she tones down the backdrop". Ally Carnwath from The Observer praised her voice but felt that "the songs themselves – a box-checking collection of commercial belters – do her few favours" and criticised the "over-egged production". Jaime Gill of Yahoo! Music called the album "blustering and oddly emotionally lacking", however he felt that it "has some redeeming features" such as "Maguire's blowy, showy voice". Leo Kristofferson of So So Gay said "There are moments in the album where you can not fail to hear faint echoes of the amazing female talent that has gone before her. However, to claim that she is simply imitating the style of others would be to underestimate the sheer power of the songwriting, production and vocal talent on display here.".

Lewis G. Parker of BBC Music wrote that Light After Dark "is just the latest CD to keep in the car for the drive home after a hard day at the office"; he called the songs "unadventurous", the lyrics "so vague [...] that they can be interpreted to mean whatever we like" and stated that it "communicates nothing other than a total lack of imagination". Michael Hann of The Guardian praised Maguire's voice, however he noted that she is "another startling talent whose every point of interest has been sandblasted off between being signed and getting her album out". Andy Gill from The Independent wrote that "over the course of an album her tremulous, stentorian con-tralto becomes hectoring" and noticed that "at full blast, she has the emotive subtlety of a foghorn". He concluded by saying that "a more restrained approach might expose her sensitivities". Krystina Nellis from Drowned in Sound gave a negative review, saying that "the album's fundamental fault is that none of it feels like it is coming from the girl herself"; she went on to add that "the vague 'empowerment' lyrics are so full of clichéd clangers they actually age Maguire several years, and reduce her to sounding like little more than a session singer for hire" and eventually described the album as "uninteresting". Laura Snapes of NME was equally negative; she wrote that the album contains "12 songs eruditely critiquing social plight with Viz-level wit", criticised Maguire's "gratingly wannabe-adult voice" and concluded by stating that the album's "central failing is having a woman roughly the same age as Katy B singing songs that'd sound a bit sexless at a WI Christmas party".

== Singles ==
- "Ain't Nobody" was the first single from the album, released as a digital download on 17 October 2010; it peaked at number 78 in the UK Singles Chart. A music video was uploaded at YouTube on 8 September 2010. It has reached over 550,000 views.
- "The Last Dance", the second single from the album, was released on 20 February 2011 as a digital download, and 21 February as a physical release; it reached number 23 in the UK Singles Chart.
- "The Shield and the Sword" was released as the third single on 9 May 2011. It reached number 91 in the UK singles chart.

== Track listing ==
As well as premiering the artwork for the album, Maguire also announced the track listing for the album.

All tracks are written by Clare Maguire and Fraser T Smith, except where noted.

Standard edition
No.	Title	Writer(s)	Length
1.	"Are You Ready?" (Intro)		0:57
2.	"The Shield and the Sword"		3:32
3.	"The Last Dance"		3:34
4.	"Freedom"	Crada, Parallel Music Group (Alexander, Akintola)	3:21
5.	"I Surrender"		3:45
6.	"Bullet"		3:28
7.	"Happiest Pretenders"		3:56
8.	"Sweet Lie"		3:56
9.	"Break These Chains"		3:34
10.	"You're Electric"		3:57
11.	"Ain't Nobody"		3:56
12.	"Light After Dark"		3:58
13.	"This Is Not the End"		3:21

Digital edition bonus tracks
No.	Title	Length
14.	"Lucky"	3:34
15.	"Ain't Nobody" (Video) (Digital store exclusive)	4:01
16.	"The Last Dance" (Video) (Digital store exclusive)	3:42
17.	"Burn"	3:13
18.	"Ain't Nobody (Breakage's Suck It Up Mix)"	4:58

== Charts and release history ==
The album entered the Official UK Album Chart at number 7 with a total of 17,967 copies sold in the opening week. It spent a total of 5 weeks in the top 100 since its release.

=== Charts ===
Chart (2011)	Peak position
Irish Albums Chart	34
UK Albums Chart	7
Polish Albums Chart	57
Scottish Albums Chart	6

=== Release history ===
Region	Date	Label
Ireland	28 February 2011	Polydor
United Kingdom	28 February 2011	Polydor
United States	7 June 2011	Universal Republic
