= Robert Harvey (musician) =

English musician (born 1983)

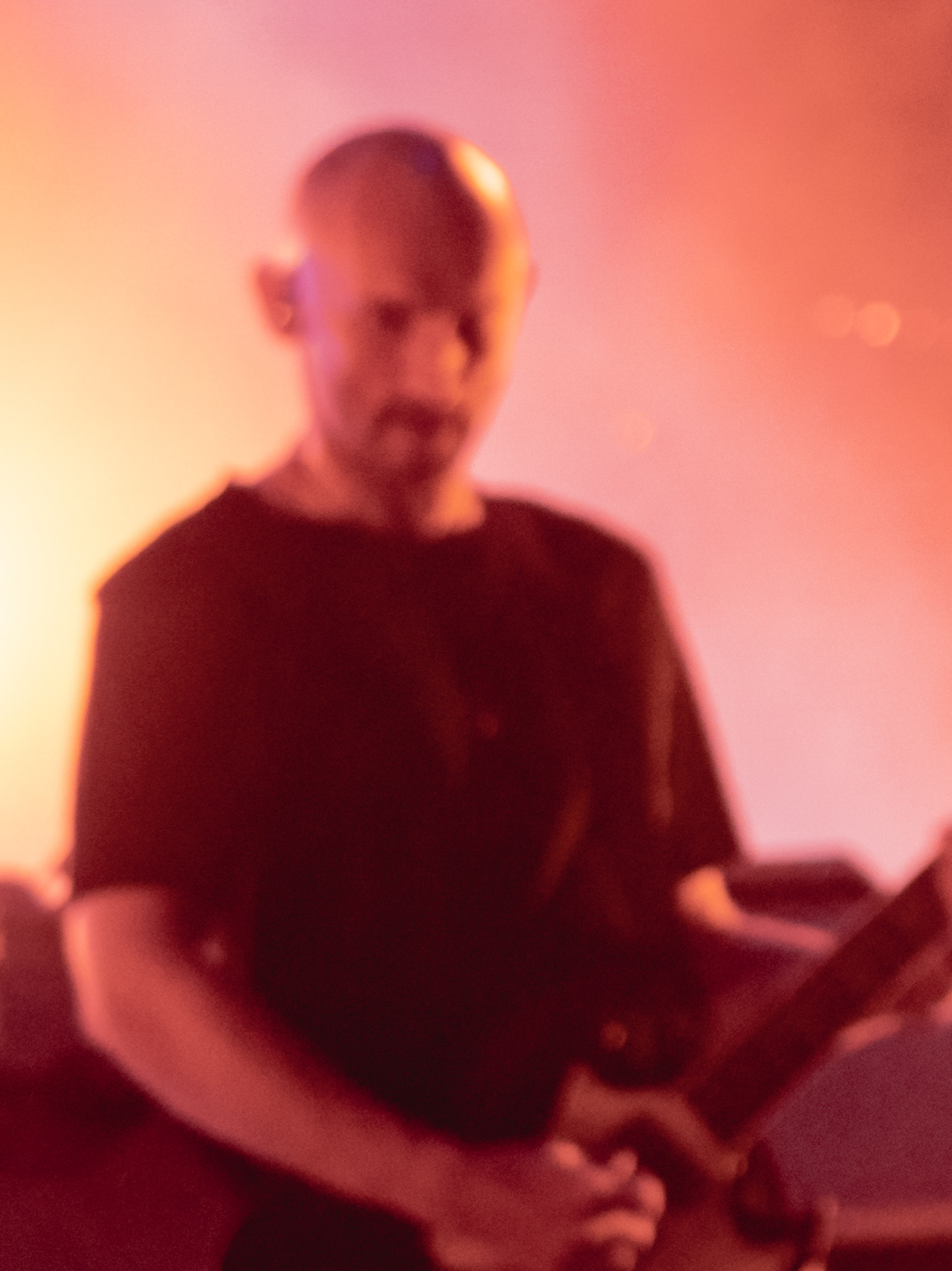
- Harvey performing with The Streets in 2021

Background information
- Born: Robert Michael Nelson Harvey; 21 May 1983 (age 43)
- Origin: Kippax, West Yorkshire, England
- Years active: 1999–present
- Labels: EMI; Hut; Capitol

Robert Michael Nelson Harvey (born 21 May 1983, in Kippax, West Yorkshire) is an English singer, musician, DJ and songwriter.

The lead singer and rhythm guitarist of The Music, he was recognisable for his distinct high-pitched vocals and Northern soul-inspired on-stage dancing. After the band's dissolution in 2011, he became involved in pop music songwriting, co-writing tracks such as "Real Love" for Clean Bandit/Jess Glynne, "Lonely" for Joel Corry (and Harlee) and "Head and Heart" for Joel Corry/MNEK. In 2021 he joined Kasabian as a touring vocalist and multi-instrumentalist.

== Music career ==
=== 2001–2011: The Music ===
Harvey formed The Music with close friends Adam Nutter, Stuart Coleman and Phil Jordan in 2001. Their first single "Take the Long Road and Walk It" peaked at 14 on the UK Singles Chart, which saw them perform live on Top of the Pops.

==== The Music (2002) ====
The group's self-titled debut album was released on Hut Records and Capitol Records and peaked at number 4 on the UK Albums Chart. It was produced by Jim Abbiss. The album was known for its circular artwork by Rob and Nick Carter. Singles "Take the Long Road and Walk It" and "The Truth Is No Words" went top 20 on the UK Singles Chart. The band toured with New Order, Coldplay, The Charlatans and Oasis, as well as selling out Blackpool Empress Ballroom and London's Brixton Academy.

==== Welcome to the North (2004) ====
The band's second studio album peaked at number 8 on the UK Albums Chart and had two top 20 singles with "Freedom Fighters" and "Breakin'". The album was produced by Brendan O'Brien. They supported Coldplay, Incubus and U2 as well as sold-out tours of their own in the UK, Japan and Australia.

==== Strength in Numbers (2008) ====
Strength in Numbers was The Music's final album and was released in 2008 on Polydor and peaked at number 19 on the UK Albums Chart. Strength in Numbers was produced by Flood and Paul Hartnol.

=== 2011–2012: The Streets ===
Harvey wrote on two songs and performed on three from Computers and Blues. The album peaked at number 8 on the UK Albums Chart. Mike Skinner asked Harvey to join him on tour as the guitarist/singer which saw The Streets headline shows and festivals across the UK and Europe.

=== 2012–2014: The D.O.T. ===
The D.O.T. saw Harvey and Mike Skinner experimenting with sound and video and saw the band travel to Japan for shows.

=== 2014: The Six ===
The Six are a Manchester collective brought together by Harvey and Rick Boardman (Delphic). The Six featured on "Take It All" by Gorgon City. Harvey co-wrote "Real Love" by Clean Bandit and Jess Glynne, which peaked at number 2 on the UK Singles Chart and number 2 in Germany. The Six then worked in the studio with MNEK, Rudimental and Lily Allen. In late 2014 The Six supported Gorgon City on tour.

=== 2021: Kasabian ===
On 27 September 2021, it was reported by the Daily Mirror that Harvey would be joining Kasabian for their forthcoming tour, following the departure of former frontman Tom Meighan in 2020.

== Discography ==
=== Songwriting and production credits ===
Year	Artist	Song	Album	Ref.
2006	X-Press 2	"Kill 100" feat. Robert Harvey	Makeshift Feelgood	
2011	The Streets	"Going Through Hell" feat. Robert Harvey	Computers and Blues	
2011	The Streets	"Soldiers" feat. Robert Harvey	Computers and Blues	
2013	Ryan Keen	"Wish You Well"	Room for Light	
2013	Ramon Tapia	"Never Gonna Know" feat. Robert Harvey	Non-album single	
2014	Odysseus	"Used to Be My Friend" feat. Ruby Goe	Non-album single	
2014	The Six	"Too Much Love"	Non-album single	
2014	Gorgon City	"Take It All" feat. The Six	Sirens	
2014	Clean Bandit	"Real Love" with Jess Glynne	New Eyes / I Cry When I Laugh	
2015	Miyavi	"Unite" feat. Robert Harvey	The Others	
2015	The Six	"Unfinished Sympathy" feat. Jasmine Thompson	Non-album single	
2015	Icarus	"Gold"	Don't Cry Wolf EP	
2015	The Six	"Nothing in the World"	Non-album single	
2015	The Six	"(Don't Go) Running"	Non-album single	
2015	Rudimental	"I Will for Love" feat. Will Heard	We the Generation	
2016	Grum	"Under Your Skin" feat. Rothchild	Non-album single	
2016	Low Steppa	"Runnin'" feat. Kelli-Leigh	Non-album single	
2016	Anton Powers	"Love You Better" feat. Sabella	Non-album single	
2016	Tom Walker	"Fly Away with Me"	What a Time to Be Alive	
2017	Steve Angello	"Dopamine" feat. Barns Courtney	Human	
2018	Felix Jaehn	"Don't Say Love" feat. Rothchild	I	
2018	TOMI	"Think About It"	What Kind of Love	
2018	Just Kiddin	"Body Talk"	Non-album single	
2019	DubVision	"Back to Life" with Afrojack	Non-album single	
2019	Jax Jones	"All 4 U"	Snacks (Supersize)	
2019	Just Kiddin	"Hurting"	Non-album single	
2020	Joel Corry	"Lonely"	Non-album single	
2020	Fia Moon	"Better Days"	Non-album single	
2020	Xenia Ghali	"Rebel Soul"	Non-album single	
2020	Joel Corry	"Head & Heart" feat. MNEK	Non-album single	
2020	Mali-Koa	"Me Before You"	Hunger	
2020	James Hype	"Afraid" feat. Harlee	Non-album single	
2020	Next Habit	"Wildfire"	Non-album single	
2020	Bakar	"1st Time"	Non-album single	
2020	Mali-Koa	"Get It Wrong"	Hunger	
2020	Mali-Koa	"Hearts"	Hunger	
2021	Norma Jean Martine	"Visiting Hours"	Non-album single	
2021	MK	"Lies" feat. Raphaella	Non-album single	
2021	Digital Farm Animals	"Last Night" feat. Harlee	Non-album single	
2021	Sonny Fodera	"Closer" with Just Kiddin feat. Lily Ahlberg	Non-album single	
2021	Lvndscape	"Say It a Little Louder" with Mathieu Koss	Non-album single	
2021	James Hype	"Good Luck" feat. Pia Mia	Non-album single	
2021	Shane Codd	"Always on My Mind" feat. Charlotte Haining	Non-album single	
2021	Michael Calfan	"Imagining" feat. Gabrielle Aplin	Non-album single	
2021	Ella Henderson	"Risk It All" with House Gospel Choir and Just Kiddin	Non-album single	
2021	Sammy Porter	"Celebrate" with Karen Harding	Non-album single	
2021	Joel Corry	"I Wish" feat. Mabel	Non-album single	
2022	Welshy	"All Day" _{feat. Nonô}	Non-album single	
2022	Harlee	"Reset"	Non-album single	
2022	Joel Corry & Becky Hill	"HISTORY"	Non-album single	
2022	Louis Tomlinson	"Bigger Than Me"	Faith In The Future	
2022	Louis Tomlinson	"Written All Over Your Face"	Faith In The Future	
2022	Louis Tomlinson	"Angels Fly"	Faith In The Future	
2022	Louis Tomlinson	"That's The Way Love Goes"	Faith In The Future	
2022	David Guetta, Becky Hill & Ella Henderson	"Crazy What Love Can Do"	Non-album single	
2023	Louis Tomlinson	"Change"	Faith In The Future	
2023	Vibe Chemistry & Harlee	"Same Old Song"	Non-album single	
2024	Becky Hill	"Darkest Hour"	Believe Me Now?	
2024	Becky Hill	"Swim"	Believe Me Now?	
2024	Becky Hill	"Linger"	Believe Me Now?	
