= Mike Skinner (musician) =

English rapper

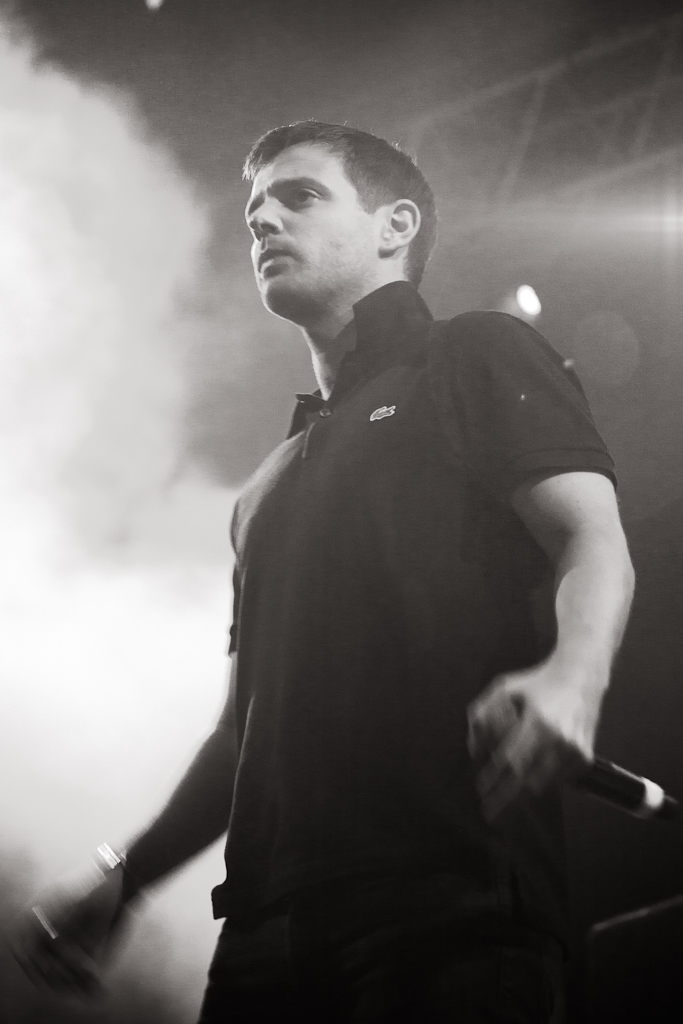
- Skinner performing at a concert in 2011

Background information
- Born: Michael Geoffrey Skinner; 27 November 1978 (age 47); Barnet, London, England
- Origin: West Heath, Birmingham, England
- Genres: Alternative hip-hop; electronic; UK garage
- Occupations: Rapper; singer; songwriter; poet; musician; record producer
- Instruments: Vocals; synthesizer; keyboards; guitar
- Years active: 1993–present
- Labels: Locked On; 679; Vice; Atlantic; Warner

Michael Geoffrey Skinner (born 27 November 1978) is an English rapper, singer-songwriter, musician, and record producer. Best known for the music project the Streets, Skinner has also released music as a solo artist, as part of the D.O.T. with frequent collaborator Rob Harvey, and under the pseudonym The Darker the Shadow the Brighter the Light.

== Early life ==
Skinner was born in Barnet, north London, and grew up in West Heath, Birmingham. He started playing with keyboards at the age of five. When he was seven years old he began experiencing symptoms of epilepsy, which worsened in his early teens. He began writing hip-hop and garage music in his home in West Heath and later built a sound booth in his bedroom, using a cupboard and a mattress. He describes his background as "Barratt class: suburban estates, not poor but not much money about, really boring".

At age 19, Skinner moved to Australia with his girlfriend; after the relationship ended Skinner stayed in Australia for a year. Upon his return to the United Kingdom, Skinner moved to south London. He sent a demo tape of an early version of what would become the song "Has It Come to This?" to a record shop run by A&R Nick Worthington. The song was released as a single in 2001, through Locked On Records.

== Music career ==
=== The Streets (1994–2011, 2017–present) ===
In the albums Skinner made under the name the Streets, he focused on vocals, arranging, composing, mixing, keyboards, and synthesizers.

=== The Beats Recordings ===
In 2005, Skinner and Ted Mayhem launched the independent record label The Beats Recordings. A subsidiary of 679 Recordings, The Beats was home to British hip-hop acts such as the Mitchell Brothers, Example, and Professor Green. In a 2008 interview with NME, Skinner announced that the label had shut down. In 2012, Skinner stated in an interview that the label was starting up again.

=== The D.O.T. and Tonga Balloon Gang (2011–present) ===
After shelving the Streets, Skinner launched a new project, called the D.O.T, along with Rob Harvey of alternative rock band the Music. Harvey performs on vocals, allowing Skinner to "further develop his production approach". Their first album, And That, was released on 22 October 2012. Their second album titled Diary was released on 5 May 2013.

In 2013, Skinner remixed Norwich rapper Context's song "Small Town Lad Sentiments". The remix features on Context's second EP, Hindsight is the Purest Form of Romance (2014). In 2015, he remixed Slaves' breakthrough single "Cheer Up London" alongside Jammer. The remix featured on an extended play exclusive to HMV, released alongside the group's debut album Are You Satisfied?.

Skinner teamed up with UK rap group Murkage to form a supergroup named Tonga Balloon Gang, and they released an eponymous three-track EP on 14 November 2015. The release features additional vocals from Jammer and Big Narstie. In 2016, Skinner released several tracks on SoundCloud under the name the Darker the Shadow, the Brighter the Light. In April 2017, he released the song "Bad Decisions in the Night" on digital platforms.

== Artistry ==
=== Musical style ===
Skinner is best known for his lyricism matched with his blurring of musical styles of UK garage, hip-hop, indie rock, reggae, and ska. The Guardian reviewer Dave Simpson particularly praised Skinner's "dazzling wordplay".

=== Influences ===
Skinner is influenced by musical genres including hip-hop, UK garage, reggae, and country and western music. The many hip-hop artists that influenced him in the making of some of the Streets' albums include Wu-Tang Clan, DJ Premier, and Erick Sermon.

== Acting and movie work ==
The soundtrack album for the film The Inbetweeners Movie was released in 2011, featuring ten new compositions by Skinner.

On 19 October 2007, the first episode of Skinner's late-night television programme, Beat Stevie, aired on Channel 4.

Skinner had a cameo role in the fifth series of Doctor Who as a security guard, featuring in the episode "The Time of Angels".

== Personal life ==
In 2008, Skinner took time off from the Streets to battle symptoms of chronic fatigue syndrome and later wrote the song "Trying to Kill M.E." to document his fight against the disorder.

In 2010, Skinner married Claire Le Marquand after their daughter Amelia was born in 2009. They also have a son, George, born in 2011.

== Discography ==
=== The Streets ===
- Original Pirate Material (2002)
- A Grand Don't Come for Free (2004)
- The Hardest Way to Make an Easy Living (2006)
- Everything Is Borrowed (2008)
- Computers and Blues (2011)
- None of Us Are Getting Out of This Life Alive (2020)
- The Darker the Shadow the Brighter the Light (2023)

=== The D.O.T ===
- And That (2012)
- Diary (2013)

== Biography ==
- The Story of The Streets. London: Bantam Press, 2012. By Mike Skinner. 304 pages. ISBN 978-0593068076. Biography recording his beginnings as a musician in the Birmingham suburbs in the garage scene, to his struggles as a commercial musician.
