= Locked On Records =

British record label

Locked On Records is a British record label, concentrating on UK garage and grime music. Founded in 1996 in London by Tarik Nashnush who was working at the record shop Pure Groove at the time, it is a subsidiary of XL Recordings. Among the artists signed to the label are the Streets, Todd Edwards, Zed Bias, Dem 2, Tuff Jam, and Artful Dodger.

== Notable artists ==
- Artful Dodger
- Danny J Lewis
- Dem 2
- Doolally
- El-B
- Leee John
- Michael Watford
- Monsta Boy
- Nu-Birth
- Phuturistix
- The Streets
- Todd Edwards
- Tuff Jam
- Wideboys
- Zed Bias

== See also ==
- UK garage
- List of Locked On Records artists
- List of Locked On Records singles
