= The Streets =

British garage music act

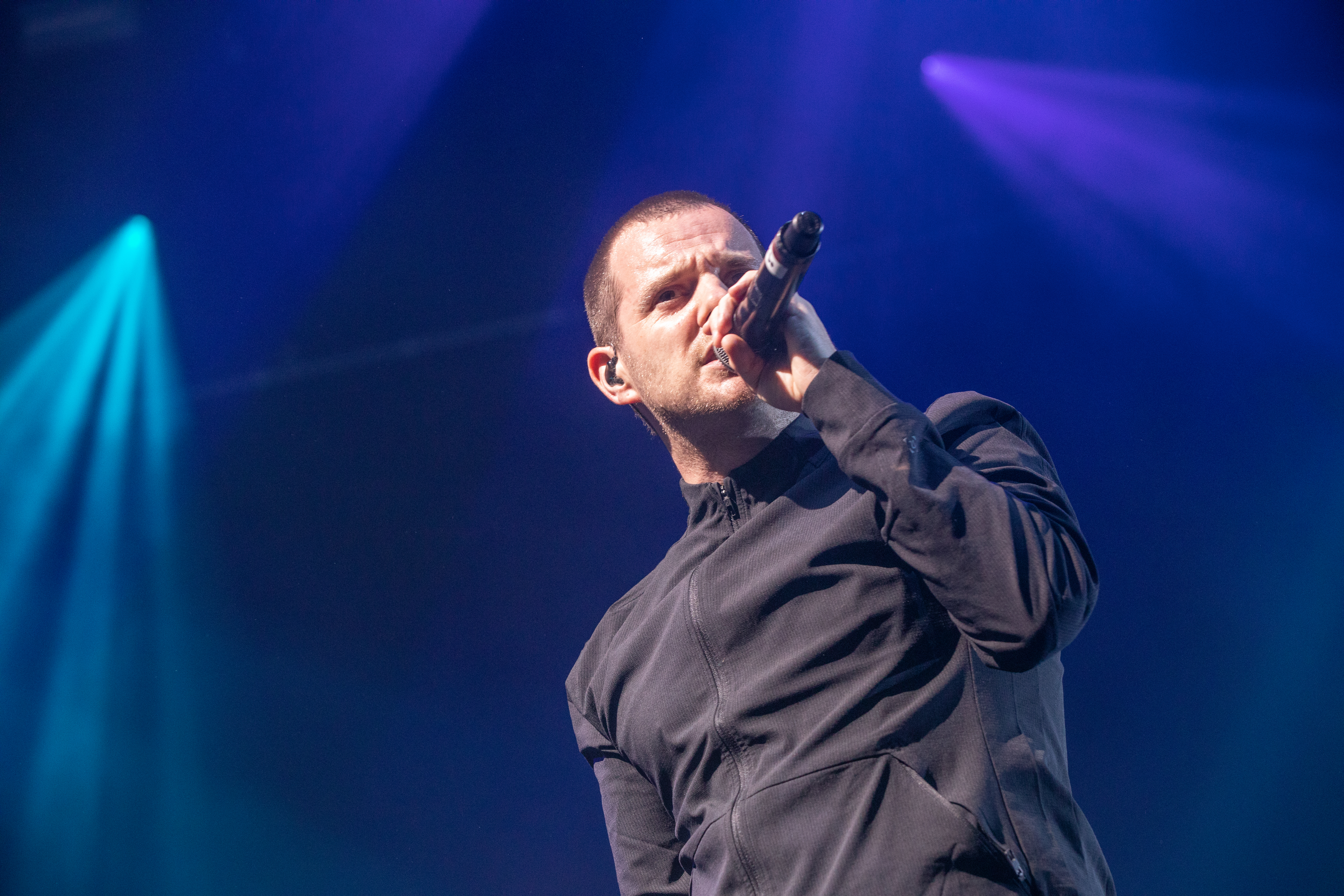
- Mike Skinner at John Peel Stage, Glastonbury in 2019

Background information
- Origin: Birmingham, West Midlands, England
- Genres: Alternative hip-hop; UK garage; grime; electronica
- Years active: 1994–2011; 2017–present
- Labels: Locked On; 679; Vice; Atlantic; Warner Music (worldwide); Island
- Members: Mike Skinner; Kevin Mark Trail; Wayne Bennett; Rob Harvey; Max O'Donnell; Cassell the Beatmaker; Gabriel Piers-Mantell
- Past members: Johnny "Drum Machine" Jenkins; Leo the Lion; Morgan Nicholls
- Website: www.thestreetsmusic.co.uk

The Streets is an English musical project led by vocalist and multi-instrumentalist Mike Skinner. The project was founded in the early 90s in Birmingham, while Skinner was still a teenager; however, no music would formally come out until the early 2000s. In the initial run of The Streets, the project released five studio albums: Original Pirate Material (2002), A Grand Don't Come for Free (2004), The Hardest Way to Make an Easy Living (2006), Everything Is Borrowed (2008) and Computers and Blues (2011). The Streets also released a string of successful singles during this time, which reached the Top 40 on the UK Singles chart – including "Has It Come to This?", "Fit but You Know It", "Dry Your Eyes" (the project's only number-one single), "When You Wasn't Famous" and "Prangin' Out". After disbanding The Streets in 2011, Skinner pursued several other musical projects before ultimately reviving the moniker in 2017. A mixtape, None of Us Are Getting Out of This Life Alive, was released in 2020. The Streets' sixth studio album, The Darker the Shadow the Brighter the Light, was released in September 2023.

The Streets is considered one of the most important and influential acts within the trajectory of hip-hop, garage and grime music within the UK. In 2020, Pitchfork described Original Pirate Material as "a landmark for UK rap", while Dazed wrote in 2018 that the album "soundtracked the beginning of a decade – recovering from the Britpop hangover and comedown from New Labour euphoria – but also defined it."

== History ==
=== 2001–2003: Original Pirate Material ===
Mike Skinner sent a demo tape to a record shop in north London, run by A&R Nick Worthington. The song developed into Skinner's first single, "Has It Come to This?", and was released under the name The Streets. The song peaked at number 18 on the UK Singles Chart in October 2001.

The Streets' debut album, Original Pirate Material, was released in March 2002. The album was successful both with critics and the general public. In the UK, the album was nominated for the Mercury Prize. Original Pirate Material was nominated for British Album of the Year, and The Streets was nominated for British Urban Act, British Breakthrough Act and British Male Solo Artist at the 2003 BRIT Awards. NME named Original Pirate Material as the third best album of 2002. Subsequent singles from Original Pirate Material include "Don't Mug Yourself", "Weak Become Heroes" and "Let's Push Things Forward".

=== 2004–2005: A Grand Don't Come for Free ===
In May 2004, Skinner released the single "Fit but You Know It", which peaked at number 4 on the UK Singles Chart. The single was later used by EA Sports as part of the soundtrack for its video game FIFA Football 2005. "Fit But You Know It" appeared on The Streets' second album, A Grand Don't Come for Free. The album entered the UK album charts at number two, but later reached number one after six weeks. The album's second single, "Dry Your Eyes", debuted at the top of the chart in the UK. "Blinded by the Lights", the third single from A Grand Don't Come for Free, peaked at number 10 on the UK Singles Chart in 2004.

=== 2006–2007: The Hardest Way to Make an Easy Living ===
The Streets' third studio album, The Hardest Way to Make an Easy Living, was released on 10 April 2006. In the UK it debuted the album chart at number one.

=== 2008–2009: Everything Is Borrowed ===
In September 2008, The Streets released their fourth studio album, Everything Is Borrowed. One song from the album was on Skinner's Myspace page for a while before being replaced by a cover of "Your Song". In a posting on his Myspace blog, Skinner noted that the group's upcoming LP would contain "peaceful, positive vibes" in comparison with 2006's "weird guilt-ridden indulgence" that was The Hardest Way To Make An Easy Living.

In a blurb about the album on Skinner's Myspace, he says, "This album started off life as parables but then I realised that it might get a bit cheesy so I got rid of the alien song and the devil song replaced them with more straight up songs. I've pretty much kept my promise that I made to myself not to reference modern life on any of them though which is hard to do and keep things personal at the same time."

=== 2010–2011: Computers and Blues and Cyberspace and Reds ===
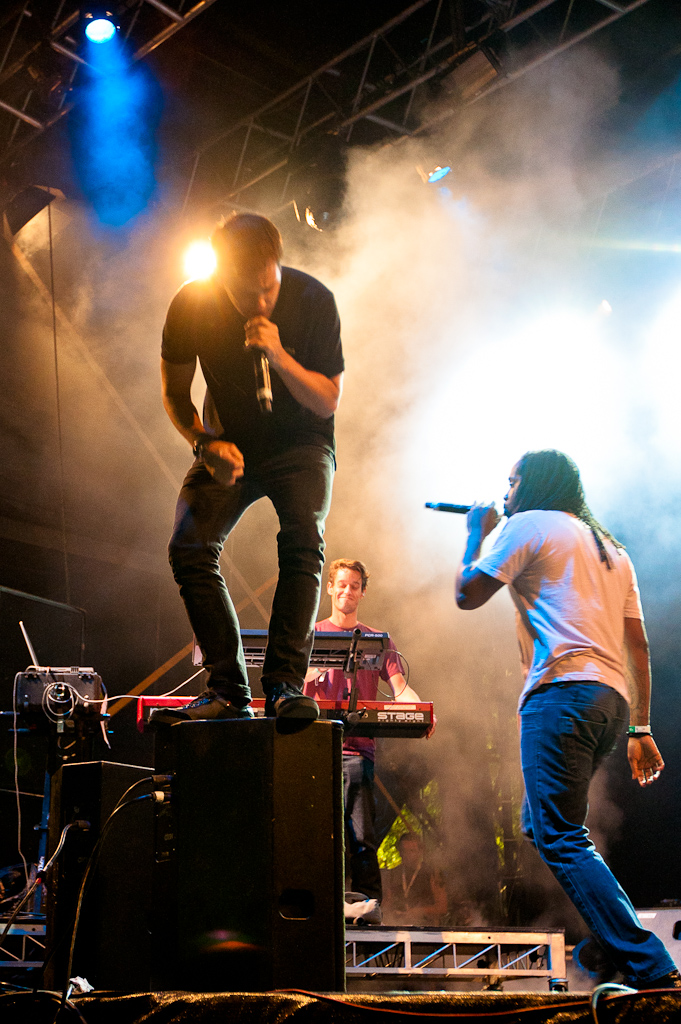
Mike Skinner and Kevin Mark Trail performing live in Sydney, 2011

In November 2010, Skinner announced on the official The Streets website, that he would release what he referred to as a mixtape album called Cyberspace and Reds, consisting of various recordings he had made since he had finished work on the final Streets album, Computers and Blues. Cyberspace and Reds was released in January 2011, initially only for download via the Streets iPhone app. A so-called "deluxe" edition was later made available for general download through the Streets website.

The fifth album Computers and Blues was released on 7 February 2011, the first single being "Going Through Hell".

=== 2017–present ===
On 22 December 2017, The Streets released two new tracks: "Burn Bridges" and "Sometimes I Hate My Friends More Than My Enemies". It was The Streets' first new music released in six years.

In 2018, The Streets released three singles: "If You Ever Need to Talk I'm not Here" was released on 31 January, "You Are Not the Voice in Your Head..." was released on 30 March, and "Call Me in the Morning" was released on 22 November.

On 1 April 2020, Skinner announced a new single featuring Australian music project Tame Impala, included on a mixtape titled None of Us Are Getting Out of This Life Alive, released 10 July 2020. The track premiered on Annie Mac's BBC Radio 1 show.

In March 2021, following the UK Government's announced COVID-19 restriction easing timetable, The Streets released the single "Who's Got the Bag (21st June)". Referencing the earliest possible date when nightclubs could reopen and the names of members of government the single was described by Skinner as a "end of lockdown celebratory track".

In October 2023, the first studio album in twelve years, The Darker the Shadow the Brighter the Light, was released.

In October 2026, The Streets performed as the musical guests on Saturday Night Live UK.

== Band members ==
Current members

- Mike Skinner – vocals, arrangement, composition, mixing, keyboards, synthesizers (1994–2011; 2017–present)

Current contributors and live musicians

- Kevin Mark Trail – vocals, production, composition (1994–2003, 2007–2011, 2018–present)
- Wayne Bennett – bass guitar, composition, guitar (2007–2011, 2018–present)
- Rob Harvey – vocals, guitar (2011, 2018–present)
- Cassell the Beatmaker – drums (2011, 2018–present)

Former contributors and live musicians

- Johnny "Drum Machine" Jenkins – drums, percussion, orchestration, production (1994–2011)
- Morgan Nicholls – bass guitar, guitar, percussion, programing piano, synthesizers (2003–2005; 2008)
- Leo the Lion – vocals (2003–2007)
- Mike Millrain – synths, soundboard, guitar, bass guitar, production
- Chris Brown – synths, piano, keyboards
- Eddie Jenkins – keyboards, piano
- Stuart Coleman – bass guitar
- Steve Corley – keyboards
- Laura Vane – vocals
- Rich Wheatley – keyboards (2002-2003)

== Discography ==
- Original Pirate Material (2002)
- A Grand Don't Come for Free (2004)
- The Hardest Way to Make an Easy Living (2006)
- Everything Is Borrowed (2008)
- Computers and Blues (2011)
- The Darker the Shadow the Brighter the Light (2023)
- Long Story Longer (TBA)
