= Hits 55 =

Compilation album by Various Artists
- Released: 31 March 2003
- Label: Sony Music Entertainment UK/WEA/RCA Ariola/BMG/Telstar UK

Various Artists chronology
Huge Hits 2003 (2002)	Hits 55 (2003)	Hits 56 (2003)

Hits 55 is a compilation album released in the UK released in March 2003. It contains 40 tracks spread over two CDs, including five number one singles from Christina Aguilera, Gareth Gates, Darius Danesh, DJ Sammy, and Elvis Presley vs. JXL The album was the first in the Hits series to contain the subtitle 40 Massive Chart Hits, although was not the first Hits album to contain 40 tracks.

== Track listing ==
Disc one

No.	Title	Artist	Length
1.	"Beautiful"	Christina Aguilera	4:01
2.	"Stole"	Kelly Rowland	3:56
3.	"Spirit in the Sky"	Gareth Gates with The Kumars	3:28
4.	"Tonight" (Metro 7" Remix)	Westlife	4:13
5.	"I Begin to Wonder""	Dannii Minogue	3:30
6.	"The Opera Song (Brave New World)"	Jurgen Vries featuring Charlotte Church	3:34
7.	"Family Portrait"	Pink	3:49
8.	"Jenny from the Block"	Jennifer Lopez featuring Jadakiss and Styles P	3:09
9.	"Complicated"	Avril Lavigne	4:05
10.	"Born to Try"	Delta Goodrem	3:53
11.	"You and I"	Will Young	4:06
12.	"Automatic"	Sarah Whatmore	3:10
13.	"You're a Superstar"	Love Inc.	3:23
14.	"Never (Past Tense)" (Filterheadz Radio Edit)	Roc Project featuring Tina Arena	3:24
15.	"Gimme the Light"	Sean Paul	3:47
16.	"James Dean (I Wanna Know)"	Daniel Bedingfield	3:40
17.	"Songbird"	Oasis	2:07
18.	"Colourblind"	Darius	3:37
19.	"Fantasy"	Appleton	3:47
20.	"Heaven"	DJ Sammy and Yanou featuring Do	3:40

Disc two

No.	Title	Artist	Length
1.	"Scandalous"	Mis-Teeq	4:00
2.	"OK"	Big Brovaz	3:18
3.	"Hidden Agenda"	Craig David	3:53
4.	"Work It"	Missy Elliott	4:01
5.	"Reminisce" (Cutfather & Joe Radio Edit)	Blazin' Squad	3:11
6.	"Girlfriend"	Alicia Keys	3:35
7.	"Dy-Na-Mi-Tee"	Ms. Dynamite	3:38
8.	"Make It Clap"	Busta Rhymes featuring Spliff Star	3:43
9.	"I'll Be Your Angel"	Kira	2:54
10.	"Mundian To Bach Ke"	Panjabi MC	3:22
11.	"Shut Up"	Kelly Osbourne	2:47
12.	"Scorpio Rising"	Death in Vegas featuring Liam Gallagher	4:12
13.	"Don't Mug Yourself"	The Streets	2:39
14.	"Cheeky Song (Touch My Bum)"	The Cheeky Girls	3:06
15.	"Holding On for You"	Liberty X	3:28
16.	"Imagination"	Harry	3:39
17.	"True"	Jaimeson featuring Angel Blu	3:34
18.	"The Way (Put Your Hand in My Hand)"	Divine Inspiration	2:59
19.	"Crush (1980 Me)"	Darren Hayes	3:40
20.	"A Little Less Conversation"	Elvis vs. JXL	3:33

== See also ==
- Now 54 (rival album)
