= List of UK Independent Singles Chart number ones of 2003 =

These are the Official Charts Company UK Official Indie Chart number one hits of 2003.

| Issue date | Song | Artist |
|---|---|---|
| 5 January | "Sacred Trust / After You're Gone" | One True Voice |
| 12 January | "Danger! High Voltage" | Electric Six |
| 19 January | "True" | Jaimeson featuring Angel Blu |
| 26 January | "Mundian To Bach Ke" | Panjabi MC |
| 2 February | "Mundian To Bach Ke" | Panjabi MC |
| 9 February | "Cry Me a River" | Justin Timberlake |
| 16 February | "Cry Me a River" | Justin Timberlake |
| 23 February | "Cry Me a River" | Justin Timberlake |
| 2 March | "Cry Me a River" | Justin Timberlake |
| 9 March | "Cry Me a River" | Justin Timberlake |
| 16 March | "Cry Me a River" | Justin Timberlake |
| 23 March | "Flash" | Queen + Vanguard |
| 30 March | "Weekend!" | Scooter |
| 6 April | "Weekend!" | Scooter |
| 13 April | "Make Me Smile (Come Up and See Me)" | Erasure |
| 20 April | "Weekend" | Scooter |
| 27 April | "Seven Nation Army" | The White Stripes |
| 4 May | "Seven Nation Army" | The White Stripes |
| 11 May ^{[a]} | "Ignition Remix" | R. Kelly |
| 18 May ^{[a]} | "Ignition Remix" | R. Kelly |
| 25 May ^{[a]} | "Ignition Remix" | R. Kelly |
| 1 June ^{[a]} | "Ignition Remix" | R. Kelly |
| 8 June | "Ignition Remix" | R. Kelly |
| 15 June | "Ignition Remix" | R. Kelly |
| 22 June | "Ignition Remix" | R. Kelly |
| 29 June | "Ignition Remix" | R. Kelly |
| 6 July | "I Just Need Myself" | Ocean Color Scene |
| 13 July | "Fast Food Song" | Fast Food Rockers |
| 20 July | "Fast Food Song" | Fast Food Rockers |
| 27 July | "Maybe Tomorrow" | Stereophonics |
| 3 August | "Maybe Tomorrow" | Stereophonics |
| 10 August | "I'm in Heaven" | Jason Nevins presents U.K.N.Y. featuring Holly James |
| 17 August | "Complete" | Jaimeson |
| 24 August | "Don't Look Back into the Sun | The Libertines |
| 31 August ^{[a]} | "Are You Ready for Love" | Elton John |
| 7 September | "Are You Ready for Love" | Elton John |
| 14 September | "Are You Ready for Love" | Elton John |
| 21 September | "Are You Ready for Love" | Elton John |
| 28 September | "I Believe in a Thing Called Love" | The Darkness |
| 5 October | "I Believe in a Thing Called Love" | The Darkness |
| 12 October | "I Believe in a Thing Called Love" | The Darkness |
| 19 October | "I Believe in a Thing Called Love" | The Darkness |
| 26 October | "Jumpin'" | Liberty X |
| 2 November | "Jumpin'" | Liberty X |
| 9 November | "Burn Burn" | Lost Prophets |
| 16 November | "Since I Told You It's Over" | Stereophonics |
| 23 November | "The Hardest Button to Button" | The White Stripes |
| 30 November | "Jus' a Rascal" | Dizzee Rascal |
| 7 December | "The Closest Thing to Crazy" | Katie Melua |
| 14 December ^{[a]} | "Changes" | Ozzy Osbourne and Kelly Osbourne |
| 21 December ^{[a]} | "Mad World" | Michael Andrews featuring Gary Jules |
| 28 December ^{[a]} | "Mad World" | Michael Andrews featuring Gary Jules |

== Notes ==
- ^{a} – The single was simultaneously number-one on the singles chart.

== See also ==
- 2003 in music
