= All Got Our Runnins =

EP by The Streets
- Released: 14 October 2003
- Genre: Alternative hip-hop, electronica, UK garage
- Length: 35:24
- Label: Vice Records
- Producer: Mike Skinner

The Streets chronology
Original Pirate Material (2002)	All Got Our Runnins (2003)	A Grand Don't Come for Free (2004)

Professional ratings
Review scores
Source	Rating
PopMatters	favourable
Prefix Magazine	5.0/10
Tiny Mix Tapes	3/5 stars

All Got Our Runnins is the debut EP released by UK act the Streets. Following the critical and commercial success of debut album Original Pirate Material, the EP was released exclusively as a digital download, distributed via iTunes and Napster, among others. It features a compilation of remixes and non-album tracks taken from the Streets' first four singles.

== Track listing ==
All tracks are written by Mike Skinner.

No.	Title	Originally from	Length
1.	"Streets Score (Instrumental)"	"Has It Come to This?" CD1 single	3:46
2.	"Give Me My Lighter Back"	"Weak Become Heroes" CD1 single	3:22
3.	"All Got Our Runnins"	"Let's Push Things Forward" CD2 single	4:22
4.	"Let's Push Things Forward" (The Streets Remix featuring Roll Deep with Dizzee Rascal)	"Weak Become Heroes" CD1 single	3:21
5.	"Don't Mug Yourself" (Mr. Figit Remix – additional vocals by Donae'o)	"Don't Mug Yourself" US CD single	2:48
6.	"Weak Become Heroes" (Ashley Beedle's Love Bug Vocal)	"Weak Become Heroes" 12-inch and CD2 single	8:14
7.	"Has It Come to This?" (High Contrast "It's Come to This" Remix)	"Don't Mug Yourself" 12-inch and CD single	5:57
8.	"Streets Score"	"Don't Mug Yourself" US CD single	3:34
Total length:			35:24
