= Hits 56 =

Compilation album by Various Artists
- Released: 28 July 2003
- Label: Sony BMGEntertainment UK/WEA/RCA Ariola/Telstar UK

Various Artists chronology
| Hits 55 (2003) | Hits 56 (2003) | Huge Hits 2004 (2003) |

Hits 56 is a compilation album released in the UK in July 2003. It contains 40 tracks spread over two CDs, and features one number one single from Tomcraft.

It is the 56th volume in the Hits compilation album series. The album had a competition with Now 55, released the following week. Because of the week's difference, Hits 56 was able to enter the UK Compilations Chart at #1, whilst the following week Now 55 did the same. Hits 56 received a mixed reception.

The Westlife song "Tonight" previously appeared on Hits 55 as a radio remix courtesy of English production team METRO

== Track listing ==
Disc one

| No. | Title | Artist | Length |
|---|---|---|---|
| 1. | "Fighter" | Christina Aguilera | 4:07 |
| 2. | "Lost Without You" | Delta Goodrem | 4:09 |
| 3. | "We Just Be Dreamin'" | Blazin' Squad | 3:29 |
| 4. | "Favourite Things" | Big Brovaz | 3:14 |
| 5. | "Baby I Don't Care" | Jennifer Ellison | 3:37 |
| 6. | "Like What" | Tommi | 2:59 |
| 7. | "I'm Glad" | Jennifer Lopez | 3:42 |
| 8. | "I'm with You" | Avril Lavigne | 3:44 |
| 9. | "Stop Sign" | Abs | 2:54 |
| 10. | "Tonight" | Westlife | 4:28 |
| 11. | "Wimmin'" | Ashley Hamilton | 3:08 |
| 12. | "Furious Angels" | Rob Dougan | 3:54 |
| 13. | "How Did You Know" | Kurtis Mantronik presents Chamonix | 3:29 |
| 14. | "Broken Bones" | Love Inc. | 2:53 |
| 15. | "Chooza Looza" | Maria Willson | 3:25 |
| 16. | "Madame Helga" | Stereophonics | 3:55 |
| 17. | "Fight Test" | The Flaming Lips | 4:09 |
| 18. | "Growing on Me" | The Darkness | 3:30 |
| 19. | "Take Your Shoes Off" | The Cheeky Girls | 2:57 |
| 20. | "Fast Food Song" | Fast Food Rockers | 3:08 |

Disc two

| No. | Title | Artist | Length |
|---|---|---|---|
| 1. | "Can't Get It Back (Ignorants Radio Remix)" | Mis-Teeq | 3:36 |
| 2. | "Can't Nobody" | Kelly Rowland | 3:52 |
| 3. | "No Letting Go" | Wayne Wonder | 3:23 |
| 4. | "Like I Love You" | Justin Timberlake | 4:43 |
| 5. | "Girlfriend" (Pied Piper Remix) | B2K | 2:57 |
| 6. | "Don't Wanna Lose This Feeling" | Dannii Minogue | 3:17 |
| 7. | "Rise and Fall (Radio edit)" | Craig David featuring Sting | 3:59 |
| 8. | "Get Busy" | Sean Paul | 3:32 |
| 9. | "Overrated" | Siobhán Donaghy | 3:41 |
| 10. | "Gossip Folks" (Fatboy Slim Remix) | Missy Elliott featuring Ludacris | 3:31 |
| 11. | "This Is Your Night" | Anotherside | 3:39 |
| 12. | "Guantanamo" | Outlandish | 3:28 |
| 13. | "Everybody Come On (Can U Feel It)" (Stanton Warriors Remix) | Mr. Reds vs. DJ Skribble | 4:54 |
| 14. | "Sleeping Satellite" | Aurora featuring Naimee Coleman | 3:37 |
| 15. | "All Out of Love" | The Foundations | 3:13 |
| 16. | "What's Your Name" | Morcheeba | 3:26 |
| 17. | "When I See You" | Macy Gray | 3:43 |
| 18. | "My Love is Always" | Saffron Hill featuring Ben Onono | 3:33 |
| 19. | "Easy" | Groove Armada | 3:52 |
| 20. | "Loneliness" | Tomcraft | 2:43 |
