= Bardo State =

Bardo State consists of the duo Frank Wijn and Dorian Broekhuyse. Frank is the son of Jan Wijn, a famous Dutch concert pianist, while Dorian attended the conservatory in Amsterdam and has a background in pop and dance music. Dorian used to work with Jocelyn Brown, Victoria Wilson James (Soul II Soul) and George Clinton during the nineties. Raised on musical influences such as Satie, Ravel & Saint-Saëns, the Dutch twosome are also inspired by contemporary composers like Arvo Pärt and Philip Glass. They compose music that is best described as a crossover between pop and classical music. Bardo State works with various classical and pop vocalists, both male and female, including Jo Lemaire and Kevin Mark Trail (The Streets). They use classical themes and traditional folk music to base their music on.
Bardo State started producing in 2004 and their debut album Mariposa was released in 2008. Their album Mariposa has been reviewed in national as well as in international magazines. Bardo State has among others remixed Radiohead and covered David Bowie and Kate Bush. One of their tracks, "Kosovo", was the soundtrack of the Hollywood film Jekyll and Hyde. Many songs of Bardo State have been licensed for several compilations, such as the "Buddha Bar"- and the "Supperclub" compilations. Two of their singles, "Paradis" and "This Is Not America", were regularly played at Radio 2 (Netherlands) and "Sospiro" was used for a performance by contestants in the Italian TV show Amici.
For the dying individual, the bardo is the period of the afterlife that lies in between two different incarnations. In January 2010 United Recordings went Bankrupt. All handling, rights and communication concerning Bardo State have been taken over by Bardo State Music.

== Discography ==
Albums

Title	Release date
Mariposa	2008

Singles

Title	Release date
Paradis EP	2008
This Is Not America EP	2008
This Is Not America (Chris Coco Remixes)	2008
Remixes Vol. 1 EP	2008
The Jezebel Spirit (Bart Claessen Remix)	2009

Remixes

Title	Release date
Kosovo (Bob Holroyd vs Shisha Sound System Mix)	2008
Mariposa (Praful's Lovebug Remix)	2008
Passio (Monte La Rue's Midnight Mix)	2008
This Is Not America (Chris Coco Remix)	2008
This Is Not America (Out Of Character Remix)	2008
Seneca (Pathaan's Dirty Dancer Mix)	2008
The Jezebel Spirit (Bart Claessen Mix)	2009

Featuring on compilations

Title compilation	Track	Release date
Supperclub presents Nomads 3	Seneca	2005
Blossom 1	Seneca	2005
This Masters Choice by Ben Mynott	Seneca	2008
Seduction 2	Seneca	2005
Pure Lounge	Seneca	2008
Tandava 2	Seneca	2008
Supperclub - Beauty	Seneca (Pathaan's dirty dancer mix)	2008
Blossom 2	Lifeblood	2006
Supperclub - Addiction	Lifeblood	2007
Buddha Bar 9	Sospiro	2007
Evasion Ethnique	Nayi	2008
Praha Siddharta	Mariposa	2008
La Nuit Vol. 3	Mariposa (Praful's Lovebug Remix)	2008
Music For Cocktails 10th Anniversary	Mariposa (Praful's Lovebug Remix)	2008
Beijing 2	Kosovo (Bob Holroyd vs Shisu System Remix)	2009
Cafe Chillout	Kosovo (Bob Holroyd vs Shisu System Remix)	2008
Jekyll & Hyde The Movie	Kosovo	2008
Obsession Lounge 3	Kosovo (Remix)	2008
Magic Voices 4	Mio Dolore	2006
.LAK	This Is Not America	2006
Love Affair	This Is Not America	2006
Venue Cafe	This Is Not America	2007
Filles Fragiles 2	Paradis	2008
Music For Cocktails Metropolitan	Passio (Monte's Midnight Mix)	2007
This Masters Choice by Monte La Rue	Passio (Monte's Midnight Mix)	2008
Supperclub presents Nomads 6	Poete Electronique	2008
Music For Cocktails Elite Edition	This Is Not America	2009
Beachclub Vroeger	Lifeblood	2009
Big Sur Life - Formentera vol. 3	Mariposa	2009
Purobeach Volumen Cinque	This Is Not America (Out Of Character Remix), Mariposa (Praful's Lovebug Remix)	2009
Pinacolada vol. 6	Mariposa	2009
Church Lounge vol. 2	Sospiro	2009

== Members ==
Frank Wijn (producer)
Dorian Broekhuyse (producer)
