= Times Like These (Friday Hill album) =

Studio album by Friday Hill
- Released: 27 February 2006
- Recorded: London, England
- Genres: Pop, hip hop, indie pop
- Length: 63:15
- Label: Polydor UK

Friday Hill chronology
Now or Never (2003)	Times Like These (2006)	Greatest Hits (2009)

Times Like These is a studio album released by British hip-hop trio Friday Hill, consisting of three members of the group Blazin' Squad. The album was released on 27 February 2006, peaking at #67 on the UK Albums Chart and selling less than 4,000 copies. The album spawned the singles "Baby Goodbye" and "One More Night Alone". The album features the radio mix of "One More Night Alone," despite a full-length version of the song appearing as part of the single release. The album covers a range of different genres of music, including pop, hip-hop and indie.

== Track listing ==
1. "One More Night Alone" (Perry / Thomas / Chinn / Murray / McKenzie / Omar) - 4:11
2. "Baby Goodbye" (Wilkins / Hubert / Eyre) - 2:54
3. "Fine"
4. "Stand Up"
5. "Over the Wall"
6. "Back to You"
7. "Shallow"
8. "Down to Earth"
9. "I Won't Walk Away (My Legs Are Broken)"
10. "Times Like These"
11. "I Want You"
12. "Running Away"
13. "Where it all Begins"
14. "Apple of my Eye"
15. "Lifeline"
16. "Down to Earth (Mark Ronson "Uberfunk" Remix)"

B-Sides

- "Back on Your Feet" (Wilkins / Hubert / Eyre / McKenzie / Omar / Murray)
- "Go" (McKenzie / Omar / Murray)
- "Running Away" (Demo) (McKenzie / Omar / Murray / Martin)

== Chart performance ==
Chart (2006)	Provider	Peak position
UK Album Chart	OCC/BPI	67
