= Tower Block Dreams =

- Genre: Documentary
- Directed by: David O’Neill; Adam Smith
- Country of origin: United Kingdom
- Original language: English
- No. of series: 1
- No. of episodes: 3

Production
- Executive producer: Dimitri Doganis
- Producer: Christian Ponder
- Production location: United Kingdom
- Camera setup: Single-camera
- Running time: 60 minutes
- Production company: Raw TV

Original release
- Network: BBC Three
- Release: 8 January – 22 January 2004

Tower Block Dreams was a British documentary series that broadcast on BBC Three during January 2004, investigating the underground music scene on council estates in London and Southend in the United Kingdom. A total of three 1 hour episodes were produced and broadcast at a 9pm timeslot.

Tower Block Dreams looked at modern inner city life, through the stories of young musicians trying to make a career in music. The series showed that the underground music scene is fuelled by pirate radio stations and rappers' ambitions to become successful in the future.

The series was shot on council estates in Tottenham, Finsbury Park, Bow and Archway in London and Southend-On-Sea in Essex.

UK hip hop acts Skinnyman and Sloth featured on the first episode, Spittin' and Shottin', and garage producer and MC Jaimeson featured on the third episode, Grimetime to Primetime.

== Episodes ==
No.	Title	Original release date
1	"Spitting and Shotting"	8 January 2004
This edition features London rappers Sloth and Skinnyman, both of whom have criminal pasts, but are striving to stay on the straight and narrow. Sloth grew up on the notorious Somers Town estate in North West London. He was first arrested aged 11 and has been in trouble with the law ever since. Now he’s decided to avoid threats on his life becoming a reality, he must leave the "ghetto life" behind him and focus on his music. Skinnyman is desperate to reclaim the record deal he lost after being sent to prison for possession of cannabis with intent to supply, but when the major record labels show little interest in signing him, he decides to make and release his own records. The film follows their efforts to make a career out of music, which both hope will save them from doing more crime and more jail-time.
2	"Ghetto on Sea"	15 January 2004
This edition features emcees Killer and Gambit who both live in council estates in Southend. Killer runs Y2K FM, a pirate radio station in Southend that plays house and garage music and broadcasts to Essex, Kent and East London. His feud with DJ Funky from Charm FM, a rival pirate station, leads him to remove their radio transmitter from the roof of a nearby tower block. Killer's attempt to organise a rave ends in disaster and he loses his temper. Aspiring star Gambit hopes that his MC'ing career will give him an alternative lifestyle that doesn’t revolve around the drug scene and court appearances, enabling him to achieve some stability in his life, away from all the arguments that go with an illegal business. The film follows both stories as they pursue their passions for music.
3	"Grimetime to Primetime"	22 January 2004
This edition features Scarface and Mini-Me, a teenage rapping duo from a housing estate in Tottenham hoping to make the big time, and Jamieson, a record producer whose latest single, True, produced in his bedroom on the 19th floor of a tower block, has suddenly entered the charts at number 4. Scarface, Mini-Me and their manager Reds do everything themselves, from pressing their own vinyl to touting them around record shops. At the other end of the spectrum, Jamieson has performed on Top of the Pops and has the backing of a record label to help with his next release. Now that he’s had one hit, the pressure is on – his second single will decide whether he has a future in music, or should go back to working behind the counter in a high street bank. The film follows and contrasts their different experiences of the music business, and how far they are able to follow their different dreams.

== See also ==
- People Just Do Nothing
