= Baby Goodbye =

Baby Goodbye may refer to:

- "Baby Goodbye" (E.M.D. song)
- "Baby Goodbye" (Friday Hill song)
- "Baby Goodbye" Alle Farben song 2026
