= Tha Crossroads =

1996 single by Bone Thugs-n-Harmony

Single by Bone Thugs-n-Harmony

from the album E. 1999 Eternal
- B-side: "Crossroad"; "Budsmokers Only"
- Released: April 23, 1996
- Genre: Hip hop
- Length: 3:44
- Label: Ruthless
- Songwriters: Bone; Tim Middleton; Tony-C
- Producer: Tim Middleton

Bone Thugs-n-Harmony singles chronology
"East 1999" (1995)	"Tha Crossroads" (1996)	"Days of Our Livez" (1996)

Music video
- "Tha Crossroads" on YouTube

"Tha Crossroads" is a song written and performed by American hip hop group Bone Thugs-n-Harmony, released as a single in April 1996 by Ruthless Records. The song is dedicated to the group's mentor, the late gangsta rapper Eazy-E, and other family members. The song was the highest-debuting rap single when it debuted at number two on the US Billboard Hot 100, reaching number one the following week and staying there for eight consecutive weeks. It also reached number one in New Zealand, where it was the most successful single of 1996. In 1997, the song won a Grammy for Best Rap Performance by a Duo or Group.

== Background ==
"Crossroad" originally debuted in 1995 on the E. 1999 Eternal album. It was dedicated to Bone's late friend Wallace (Wally) Laird III, but after the death of Eazy-E they decided to remake it as "Tha Crossroads". The original song appears on the edited version of the album, though the European release has the original as track number 8 and the remix as track 18. The song is performed by four of the group's members, (Krayzie Bone, Layzie Bone, Bizzy Bone and Wish Bone). After receiving high praise for their song the group decided to make it their third single for their already released album, E. 1999 Eternal.

In 2019, a version including group member Flesh-n-Bone was released with the Bone Thugs-n-Harmony compilation album Lost Archives Vol 1, after receiving their publishing rights from Ruthless Records.

== Reception ==
The song was a hit worldwide and reached the top of the US Billboard Hot 100 and the New Zealand Singles Chart. It was the highest-debuting rap single ever when it entered the national singles chart at #2 and a week later became #1 making it the fastest single to rise to the top position on the charts since the Beatles with "Can't Buy Me Love" in 1964. The song earned them a Grammy award in 1997 for Best Rap Performance by a Duo or Group.

On the New Zealand chart, it was the most successful song of 1996. It has been certified double platinum in the United States and platinum in New Zealand. In 2008, "Tha Crossroads" was ranked number 33 on VH1's "100 Greatest Songs of Hip Hop".

== Music video ==
The music video was filmed on February 27–28, 1996. It opens with the female vocal group Tre' (Kimberly Cromartie, Rebecca Forsha and Maniko Williams) singing the traditional spiritual "Mary Don't You Weep" in a church funeral setting, followed by the members of Bone Thugs-n-Harmony singing the main song in several settings, such as a church and a mountain top.

The main focus of the video is a big, imposing man wearing sunglasses, a black hat, and a trench coat, akin to a Reaper. Bone are among the few who can see the man, and watch him as he gathers souls of various individuals who are marked for death, such as a young man who leaves his distraught mother behind (presumably having died after entering life as a gang member), Bone's friend Wally, Wish Bone's Uncle Charles, Eazy-E, and a newborn baby (possibly having died from a childbirth complication). The Reaper leads the souls, with the baby in his arms, up a mountain where he reveals himself to be an angel, then takes the dead to Heaven.

At the 1996 MTV Video Music Awards, the song was nominated for Video of the Year, Best Group Video, Best Rap Video (it lost to Coolio's Gangsta's Paradise), Viewer's Choice and Best Special Effects. The group performed the song live at the ceremony.

== Track listings ==
- US, Canadian, and UK CD single
1. "Tha Crossroads" (D.J. U-Neek's Mo Thug remix) – 3:46
2. "Tha Crossroads" (D.J. U-Neek's remix instrumental) – 3:46
3. "Crossroad" (LP version) – 3:31
4. "Crossroad" (LP version instrumental) – 3:23
- US 12-inch single

A1. "Tha Crossroads" (D.J. U-Neek's Mo Thug remix) – 3:46
A2. "Tha Crossroads" (D.J. U-Neek's remix instrumental) – 3:46
A3. "Crossroad" (LP version radio edit) – 3:31
B1. "Crossroad" (LP version) – 3:31
B2. "Crossroad" (LP version instrumental) – 3:23
B3. "Budsmokers Only" (LP version) – 3:35

- US cassette single and Australian CD1
1. "Tha Crossroads" (D.J. U-Neek's Mo Thug remix) – 3:46
2. "Crossroad" (LP version) – 3:31
- UK cassette single
1. "Tha Crossroads" (D.J. U-Neek's Mo Thug remix) – 3:46
2. "Budsmokers Only" – 3:35
- UK 12-inch single

A1. "Tha Crossroads" (D.J. U-Neek's Mo Thug remix) – 3:46
A2. "Tha Crossroads" (D.J. U-Neek's remix instrumental) – 3:46
B1. "Crossroad" (LP version) – 3:31
B2. "Budsmokers Only" (LP version) – 3:35

- European CD single
1. "Crossroad" (LP version) – 3:31
2. "Tha Crossroads" (D.J. U-Neek's Mo Thug remix) – 3:46
- European maxi-CD single
1. "Crossroad" (LP version) – 3:31
2. "Tha Crossroads" (D.J. U-Neek's Mo Thug remix) – 3:46
3. "Tha Crossroads" (D.J. U-Neek's remix instrumental) – 3:46
- Australian CD2
1. "Tha Crossroads" (D.J. U-Neek's Mo Thug remix)
2. "Tha Crossroads" (D.J. U-Neek's remix instrumental)
3. "Crossroad" (LP version radio edit)
4. "1st of tha Month" (The Kruder and Dorfmeister remix)
5. "Thuggish Ruggish Bone"

== Charts ==
=== Weekly charts ===
Chart (1996)	Peak position
Australia (ARIA)	15
Austria (Ö3 Austria Top 40)	34
Belgium (Ultratop 50 Flanders)	28
Belgium (Ultratop 50 Wallonia)	20
Canada (Nielsen SoundScan)	9
Canada Top Singles (RPM)	30
Europe (Eurochart Hot 100)	12
Europe (European Dance Radio)	13
France (SNEP)	29
Germany (GfK)	15
Iceland (Íslenski Listinn Topp 40)	19
Ireland (IRMA)	6
Israel (Israeli Singles Chart)	4
Netherlands (Dutch Top 40)	4
Netherlands (Single Top 100)	5
New Zealand (Recorded Music NZ)	1
Scottish Singles Sales (Official Charts)	26
Sweden (Sverigetopplistan)	7
Switzerland (Schweizer Hitparade)	19
UK Singles (Official Charts)	8
UK Dance (Official Charts)	13
UK Hip Hop/R&B (Official Charts)	1
US Billboard Hot 100	1
US Dance Singles Sales (Billboard)	21
US Hot R&B/Hip-Hop Songs (Billboard)	1
US Hot Rap Songs (Billboard)	1
US Pop Airplay (Billboard)	18
US Rhythmic Airplay (Billboard)	1
US Cash Box Top 100	1

=== Year-end charts ===
Chart (1996)	Position
Australia (ARIA)	39
Europe (Eurochart Hot 100)	97
Germany (Media Control)	71
Netherlands (Dutch Top 40)	45
Netherlands (Single Top 100)	41
New Zealand (RIANZ)	1
Sweden (Topplistan)	39
UK Singles (OCC)	73
US Billboard Hot 100	7
US Hot R&B Singles (Billboard)	3
US Hot Rap Singles (Billboard)	2
US Top 40/Mainstream (Billboard)	58
US Top 40/Rhythm-Crossover (Billboard)	6

=== Decade-charts ===
Chart (1990–1999)	Position
US Billboard Hot 100	25

== Certifications ==
Region	Certification	Certified units/sales
Australia (ARIA)	Gold	35,000^{^}
New Zealand (RMNZ)	2× Platinum	60,000^{‡}
United Kingdom (BPI)	Silver	200,000^{‡}
United States (RIAA)	2× Platinum	2,000,000^{^}
^{^} Shipments figures based on certification alone.^{‡} Sales+streaming figures based on certification alone.

== Release history ==
Region	Date	Format(s)	Label(s)	Ref.
United States	April 23, 1996	12-inch vinyl; CD; cassette	Ruthless	
United Kingdom	July 29, 1996	12-inch vinyl; CD; cassette	Ruthless	

== Blazin' Squad version ==
"Crossroads"

Single by Blazin' Squad

from the album In the Beginning
- B-side: "Offering"; "Uproar"
- Released: August 19, 2002
- Recorded: 2002
- Length: 3:10
- Label: EastWest
- Songwriters: Ernest Isley; Marvin Isley; O'Kelly Isley; Ronald Isley; Rudolph Isley; Anthony Henderson; Steven Howse; Chris Jasper; Charles Scruggs; Bryon McCane II
- Producers: Cutfather & Joe

Blazin' Squad singles chronology
"Crossroads" (2002)	"Love on the Line" (2002)

"Crossroads", a retitled and reworked version of "Tha Crossroads", was released by British ten-piece hip-hop group Blazin' Squad as their first single in August 2002. It topped the UK Singles Chart on the week of August 25, 2002.

=== Background ===
The group's cover version of "Crossroads" was recorded for inclusion on their first studio album, In the Beginning. The decision to record and release "Crossroads" came about during the final stages of the album production: until June 2002, the song "Standard Flow" was planned for release as the group's first single, with a promotional version of the "Standard Flow" even made available on August 5. Despite being labelled as a cover version, only the chorus from the original version remains, with the verses replaced by new lyrics written by the band. Despite being the only 'cover version' the group ever recorded, it became the band's only number one single, staying at the top of the UK Singles Chart for one week in August 2002. Two versions of the song exist: the main version, which features in the music video and on In the Beginning, and the full version, which contains two extra verses, which appears on the second physical release of the single.

=== Music video ===
The music video for "Crossroads" directed by Vaughan Arnell was premiered in July 2002. The video runs for a total length of three minutes and forty-eight seconds and shows the band performing the song on top of an unfinished flyover in the centre of Cape Town. The video also shows scenes of an underpass where a number of homeless people are living, and individual shots of each band member. The video was filmed with the phantom effect, which provides a 'shadow' type movement for each member of the band.

=== Track listing ===
- Digital single
1. "Crossroads" (radio edit) – 3:10
2. "Uproar" – 3:25
- UK CD 1
1. "Crossroads" (radio edit) – 3:10
2. "Uproar" – 3:25
3. "Crossroads" (CD-ROM video) – 3:45
- UK CD 2
1. "Crossroads" (full version) – 3:50
2. "Offering" – 3:20
3. "Crossroads" (T.N.T Remix) – 3:50
- Cassette
1. "Crossroads" (radio edit) – 3:10
2. "Crossroads" (full version) – 3:50

=== Charts ===
==== Weekly charts ====
Chart (2002)	Peak position
Europe (Eurochart Hot 100)	12
Ireland (IRMA)	13
Scottish Singles Sales (Official Charts)	2
UK Singles (Official Charts)	1
UK Airplay (Music Week)	13

==== Year-end charts ====
Chart (2002)	Position
UK Singles (OCC)	67

=== Certifications ===
Region	Certification	Certified units/sales
United Kingdom (BPI)	Silver	200,000^{‡}
^{‡} Sales+streaming figures based on certification alone.

== See also ==
- List of Billboard Hot 100 number-one singles of 1996
- List of number-one R&B singles of 1996 (U.S.)
- List of number-one singles in 1996 (New Zealand)
- List of UK Singles Chart number ones of the 2000s
