= Kevin Mark Trail =

British singer-songwriter and record producer

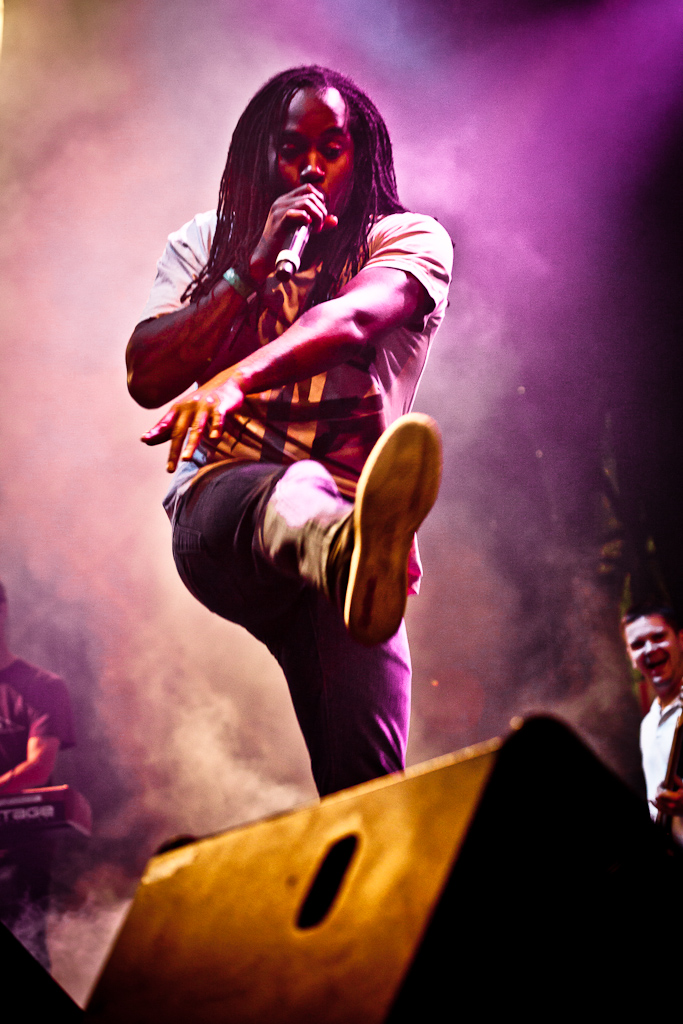
- Kevin Mark Trail performing at Parklife, Sydney 2011

Background information
- Born: Kevin Mark Trail; October 1980 (age 45–46)
- Genres: R&B, soul, reggae, hip hop, folk, electronic
- Years active: 2003–present
- Label: EMI (2004–2005)
- Website: www.kevinmarktrail.co.uk

Kevin Mark Trail (born October 1980) is a British R&B, soul, reggae and hip hop singer-songwriter and record producer. He appeared on two tracks on the Streets' debut album Original Pirate Material, including the hit single "Let's Push Things Forward", which made the top 40 of the UK Singles Chart.

== Biography ==
=== Early years ===
Trail was born and raised in North West London by immigrants from Jamaica. Trail's music is a mix of soul, reggae, hip hop, folk, and modern electro influenced by US R&B and Jamaican reggae. His mother introduced him to reggae and soul in his childhood. Travelling back to Jamaica every summer helped him secure his roots and culture. He lists acts such as Bob Marley, John Holt, Gregory Isaacs and Toots & the Maytals as some of his reggae influences, and Omar, Sade, Marvin Gaye, Stevie Wonder and Donny Hathaway as his soul influences. His influences in modern music include Little Dragon, Outkast, Roots Manuva, Prince, Bon Iver and has now taken a great interest in the way music is used in film in theatre.

At 15, Trail obtained an Atari and began drawing sketches in his bedroom in Wembley. Later, he attended a weekend arts college in Camden, where he gained experience in composition, performance and musicianship, all of which shaped his debut album Just Living. He was mentored by three tutors, John Mullon, Rachel Bennet and Julie Dexter, who encouraged his writing/sense of British identity. At the same time he also became aware of the British music scene, finding artist like Omar, Roots Manuva, Artful Dodger, and Nitin Sawhney.

Trail first shot to fame after passing a BA Hons in music production and business, when he collaborated with The Streets. He provided vocals on The Streets' hit single "Let's Push Things Forward", and also on "Same Old Thing" from his Original Pirate Material album. The single "Let's Push Things Forward" peaked at No. 30 in the UK Singles Chart. The single was his experience of chart success and remains his biggest hit to date. Trail commented at the time, "Mike Skinner is a talented guy – I rate him, man. I hadn't heard anything like it before, and that's what attracted me to the project." Skinner also invited Trail to tour as part of The Streets' live experience.

=== Just Living era ===
In 2004 Trail signed to EMI and released his first solo single, "Perspective". His second single, "D Thames" was released in February 2005 and fared better. Trail collaborated with UK rapper Estelle on the single's remix, which was featured as its B-side.

On 7 March 2005, he released his debut album, Just Living. He commented at the time that the album was about "all the stuff I experienced, just an album about life. I just write about what I experience, what's going on round me." For example, in "D Thames", he talks about a moment of clarity, in "Perspective", he talks about everyday anxieties, and "Bread" discusses the pleasure and politics of when food was served on his family's dinner table. Trail wrote, demoed and produced the tracks in his bedroom first and then arranged them and performed them with a band in the studio. He commented: "It's about trying to better yourself as a person, trying to achieve and give back. You're always facing new things and rising to the challenge, so it's a constant battle. You've got to keep moving forward and stay positive."

As well as touring with The Streets, Trail performed at venues including the Jazz Café in London. He collaborated with Nitin Sawhney on the track "Eastern Eyes", taken from his album Human, after he watched one of Trail's live performances. The collaboration received positive reviews, with Time Out magazine comparing his vocal performance to Donny Hathaway, one of his major influences. Shortly after the release of Just Living, Trail toured with Beverley Knight on her "Affirmation" tour, to which he received favourable reviews. On the tour Trail previewed a brand new song, "Last Night", which would be released shortly after on a re-release of Just Living. The album was re-released on 4 July 2005, with another new track "Ticket Line".

== Discography ==
=== Albums ===
| Year | Album |
|---|---|
| 2005 | Just Living |
| 2012 | Hope Star |
| 2014 | The Knight |
| 2017 | Free I |
| 2021 | Heart String |
| 2024 | Seeds |

=== Extended plays ===
| Year | EP |
|---|---|
| 2007 | Sketches |
| 2010 | Home Work |

=== Singles ===
| Year | Title | Chart Position | Album |
| Year | Title | UK Singles | Album |
|---|---|---|---|
| 2003 | "Let's Push Things Forward" (The Streets featuring Kevin Mark Trail) | 30 | Original Pirate Material |
| 2004 | "Perspective" | 126 | Just Living |
| 2005 | "D Thames" | 96 | Just Living |

=== Production ===
- 2013: Pieter T – Completion (on the track "Something Boubt You")
- 2012: Huia Hamon – Huia's Waiata (on the track "Karekare K road")
- 2011: Kevin Leo – Powerful (on the track "Powerful)
- 2011: Lyric L – Amazed (on the track "Away")
- 2011: Lyric L – Amazed (on the track "To Me Me Me")
- 2011: Lyric L – Amazed (on track String City)
- 2011: Dean Atta – Post Card to Paradise

=== Collaborations/writing ===
- 2023: BYAMM – The Anthropomorphic Fantasy EP (on the track "Shine")
- 2022: So.Crates – Malcolm After Mecca (on the track "7th Day")
- 2021: Sola Rosa – Chasing the Sun (on the tracks "For the Mighty Dollar", "Chasing the Sun", "So Many Times")
- 2018: Sola Rosa - In Spaces EP (on the tracks "Leave a Light On", "So Fly", "Truth")
- 2015: Kings of Tomorrow (on the track "Long Road Home")
- 2014: Sola Rosa – Magnetics (on the tracks "To the Ocean", "Both of Us", "Roots and Culture")
- 2013: Jason Eli – Music Is Life EP (on the track "Music Is Life")
- 2012: Ilana Lorraine – My Little Tree (on the track "I Choose Life")
- 2012: Kevin Field – Field of Vision (on the tracks "As One", "To Know")
- 2012: Kevin Leo – Blackbird (on the track "Run")
- 2012: Yebiisu - Exit City (on the track "420")
- 2011: Sharlene Hector – Expressions EP (on the track "Like I Used To")
- 2011: Kevin Leo – Powerful (on the track "Powerful")
- 2011: Lyric L – Amazed (on the tracks "Away", "To Me Me Me", "String City")
- 2010: Motet – Various – Jazz Re:freshed Volume One (on the track "Angel")
- 2010: Nathan Haines – Heaven and Earth (on the track "Pathways")
- 2010: Bardo State – Mariposa (on the track "I Feel You")
- 2003: Nitin Sawhney – Human (on the track "Eastern Eyes")
