= Tymes 4 =

English pop band

- Origin: London, England
- Genres: Pop
- Years active: 2001–2005
- Label: Avex Records
- Past members: Melissa Garrick; Taymah Gaye; Leah Tribe; Natalie Edwards; Holly Mallett

Tymes 4 were a four-piece girl group from London. They released two albums and three singles.

== History ==
Their first single was "Bodyrock", released in August 2001 in the United Kingdom. It was promoted around the UK, appearing on different television shows and with Tymes 4 doing a mini tour around selected schools. The track reached #23 on the UK Singles Chart, with a three-week residence. Their second single was "She Got Game" and featured on BBC Television's Children in Need show, Live & Kicking, The Saturday Show and the Pepsi Chart Show. This was also a top 40 hit in the United Kingdom reaching #40, in December 2001.

The group went quiet for about six months but returned in mid-2002 with the news that band member Holly James (her name was Holly Mallet at the time of being in Tymes 4) had left the band to go solo and pursue an acting career. They found another member called Leah Tribe, and they returned to work. In mid-2002, they re-released their debut single "Bodyrock" in Europe with a new cover and new remixes. One of the remixes called "Bodyrock" (Full Crew R'N'B Remix) had different lyrics than the original. The re-release was a flop and did not chart.

The band returned in April 2003 with the new single "Hooked", co-written by band member Taymah Gaye, and released later that month after a promotion campaign in the Netherlands. Tymes 4 appeared on Top of the Pops and Box Fresh, and the single reached #69 in the Netherlands. Their debut album 4 Story followed, and they concentrated in the Japan market, where they signed a recording contract with Avex Records. In January 2005, their second album, The Covers appeared which featured cover versions of various contemporary tracks by artists including Mariah Carey ("Always Be My Baby"), TLC ("No Scrubs") and Cyndi Lauper ("Time After Time").

The group then split; former member Holly James performed guest vocals on Jason Nevins' "I'm in Heaven", which entered the UK Singles Chart at #9. Melissa Garrick performed guest vocals on Supafly's "Moving Too Fast" in 2006, which reached #23 in the UK. Taymah Gaye has retired from the music industry and has given birth to a child, while Leah Tribe and Natalie Edwards have also moved on.

=== 2016 ===
Their debut album 4 Story, originally released in some European countries and Asia, was finally released in the UK on 8 July 2016, 13 years since the original release in 2003, onto iTunes with bonus tracks.
