= East 1999 =

Single by Bone Thugs-n-Harmony

from the album E. 1999 Eternal
- Released: October 21, 1995
- Recorded: 1995
- Genre: Horrorcore; hip hop; gangsta rap
- Length: 4:21
- Label: Ruthless
- Songwriters: Michael A. Cowan, Anthony Henderson, Stanley Howse, Bryon McCane, Kenneth McCloud, Steven Howse, Tim Middleton, Charles Scruggs
- Producers: DJ U-Neek, Tony C (co-producer)

Bone Thugs-n-Harmony singles chronology
"1st of tha Month" (1995)	"East 1999" (1995)	"Tha Crossroads" (1996)

Music video
- "East 1999" on YouTube

"East 1999" is a song by American hip-hop group Bone Thugs-n-Harmony, released as a second single from their album, E. 1999 Eternal (1995). This is one of five songs on the album to feature member Flesh-n-Bone who wasn't signed to Ruthless with the rest of the group.

== Official version ==
1. "East 1999" (LP Version) (4:21)
2. "East 1999" (U-Neek's Last Dayz Remix) (4:26)
3. "Buddah Lovaz" (LP Version) (5:43)
  - Verse 1 - Layzie Bone
  - Verse 2 - Krayzie Bone
  - Verse 3 - Bizzy Bone
  - Verse 4 - Flesh-n-Bone
  - Verse 5 - Wish Bone

== Import version ==
1. "East 1999" (Album Version) (4:21)
2. "East 1999" (U-Neek's Last Dayz Remix) (4:26)
3. "East 1999" (U-Neek's Last Dayz Remix (A Capella))
4. "Buddah Lovaz" (4:43)
5. "1st of tha Month" (DJ Premier Mix) (5:07)
6. "1st of tha Month" (The Kruder & Dorfmeister Session - Part 1) (6:12)
7. "1st of tha Month" (The Kruder & Dorfmeister Session - Part 3) (6:20)

== Charts ==
Chart (1995)	Debut Position	Peak Position
US Billboard Hot 100	94	62
US Hot Rap Songs (Billboard)	15	8
US Hot R&B Songs (Billboard)	58	39
US Cash Box Top 100		42

"East 1999" charted weekly on the US Billboard's Hot Rap Songs chart from December 9, 1995, to March 23, 1996. It was then absent from the charts for three weeks before re-entering the chart for a further two weeks bringing "East 1999"'s chart-week tally to 18. A website was built in honor of the song and music put out by bone, East1999.com.

== Personnel ==
=== Official version ===
  - Produced by: DJ U-Neek for U-Neek Entertainment, Inc
  - Executive produced by: Eazy-E
  - Co-produced by: Tony C
  - Published by: Mo' Thug Muzic (ASCAP), Keenu Songs (BMI), Don Khris Music (BMI)

=== Import version ===
  - Remix and additional production by: Peter Kruder and Richard Dorfmeister (tracks 6 & 7)
  - Published by: Ruthless Attack Muzick, Mo' Thug Muzic, Dollarz N Sense Muzick, Keenu Songs, Donkhris Music
