= Let's Start Again =

Single by Blazin' Squad

from the album Greatest Hits
- Released: 15 June 2009
- Recorded: 2008
- Genre: R&B
- Label: Naughty Boy Records

Blazin' Squad singles chronology
"All Night Long" (2006)	"Let's Start Again" (2009)

"Let's Start Again" is a song by the then five-piece hip-hop group Blazin' Squad, released as a single on 15 June 2009.

== Background ==
In 2009, Strider, Flava, Kenzie, Krazy and Rocky B announced that they would be reuniting as a five-piece version of Blazin' Squad, following the failed success of the four-piece reformation in 2006, and the minor success of Friday Hill in 2005. In June 2009, the five piece released their comeback single, "Let's Start Again". They also recruited modern artists Bashy and Chipmunk for a remix of the track. Despite heavy airplay, however, the single only peaked at #51 on the UK Singles Chart. Despite their record label wanting to drop them following the poor success of the single, they had signed a bonding contract to release an album. As such, the label issued a Greatest Hits compilation, containing "Let's Start Again", as well as a selection of the group's previous singles, via digital download, and thus, ended the contract with the group. The group made a personal appearance at Better Leisure in Great Yarmouth to sign physical copies of the single on 19 June 2009.

== Music video ==
The music video for "Let's Start Again" premiered on 15 April 2009, at a total length of four minutes and ten seconds. The music video features scenes of the band in and around a train station, each in their own individual situations, all taking place in Osaka, Japan. It is the only Blazin' Squad video which has never been commercially issued on a physical or digital format. The video features links to purchase physical and digital copies of the single.

== Reception ==
Amazingly the single was generally well received by critics, removing fans' doubts as to their credibility on reunification. The BBC Chart Blog and Digital Spy both awarded the single four stars out of five. In a foreseeable review, Female First's Ruth Harrison was also positive and commented on their perennial comparisons with the band So Solid Crew. She said: "I can promise you one thing - Blazin Squad have come so far with their new single, that it’s just a case of So Solid Who?"

== Track listings ==
- Digital single
1. "Let's Start Again" (radio edit) - 3:44
2. "Let's Start Again" (grime remix featuring Bashy and Chipmunk) - 4:01
3. "Let's Start Again" (acoustic version) - 3:53
- CD single
1. "Let's Start Again" (radio edit) - 3:44
2. "Let's Start Again" (grime remix featuring Bashy and Chipmunk) - 4:01

== Charts ==
Chart (2009)	Peak position
UK Singles (Official Charts)	51
