= Here 4 One =

Single by Blazin' Squad

from the album Now or Never
- B-side: "Mic Check"; "Twisted Up"
- Released: 2 February 2004
- Recorded: 2003
- Genre: Hip hop
- Label: East West Records
- Songwriter(s): Lee Collin Bailey, Stuart Baker, Christian Ballard, Thomas Nicholas Beasley, Samuel David Foulkes, Oliver Constantine Georgiou, James Victor MacKenzie, Christopher James McKeckney, Obi Simbarashe Mhondera, Andrew Ian Murray, James Terrence Murray, Mustafa Omer, Marcel Stephen Elliot Somerville, Jane Vaughan

Blazin' Squad singles chronology
| "Flip Reverse" (2003) | "Here 4 One" (2004) | "Baby Goodbye" (2005) |

"Here 4 One" is a song by ten-piece hip-hop group Blazin' Squad, released as the third and final single from the group's second studio album, Now or Never.

== Background ==
Following the release of "Flip Reverse", the group's record company, East West, made the decision to add a new member to the band, and as such Jamsey, real name James Leeson, joined the band in January 2004. As the third single from Now or Never had yet to be released, East West asked the band to re-record the album track "Here 4 One", with a new rap verse from Jamsey. On 2 February 2004 "Here 4 One" was released as a single, peaking at #6 on the UK Singles Chart. Despite all three singles from the album peaking inside the UK Top 10, in April 2004, East West made the decision to drop the group, due to poor sales of the album, Now or Never. Thus, in May 2004, the band split for the first time, with "Here 4 One" becoming the last release before their initial split.

== Music video ==
The music video for "Here 4 One" premiered in January 2004, at a total length of three minutes and fifty-eight seconds. It marked new band member Jamsey's first appearance in one of the group's music videos. The video features the band performing in the song in a derelict haunted mansion, with only one small light lighting the whole room. The video received strong airplay in support of new band member Jamsey. An edited version of the video, removing two small shots, was included as part of the physical single.

== Track listing ==
- Digital single
1. "Here 4 One" (Radio Edit) - 3:10
2. "Here 4 One" (Jameson Remix) - 5:25
3. "Mic Check" - 4:06
4. "Twisted Up" - 3:12
- CD single
1. "Here 4 One" (Radio Edit) - 3:10
2. "Here 4 One" (Jameson Remix) - 5:25
3. "Mic Check" - 4:06
4. "Twisted Up" - 3:12
5. "Here 4 One" (CD-Rom Video) - 3:57
6. "Here 4 One" (Making of the Video) (CD-Rom Video) - 2:00

== Charts ==
| Chart (2004) | Peak position |
|---|---|
| Ireland (IRMA) | 14 |
| UK Singles (OCC) | 6 |
