= I'll Be Your Angel =

Single by Kira
- Released: 17 February 2003
- Recorded: 2003
- Genre: Trance
- Length: 2:53
- Label: NuLife
- Songwriter(s): Bart Grinaert; Bert Wilmaers; Maarten Wilmaers; Chantal Kashala
- Producer(s): Bart Grinaert; Bert Wilmaers; Maarten Wilmaers

Kira singles chronology
"I'll Be Your Angel" (2003)	"2 Hearts" (2003)

"I'll Be Your Angel" is a song by Belgian singer Kira in 2003. It was released as a single on 17 February 2003 in the United Kingdom. The single debuted at a peak position of number 9 in the UK Singles Chart.

== Track listing ==
CD 1

1. "I'll Be Your Angel" (radio edit) – 2:53
2. "I'll Be Your Angel" (extended mix) – 5:47
3. "I'll Be Your Angel" (Alphazone remix) – 7:31
4. "I'll Be Your Angel" (Minimalistix remix) – 3:20

== Charts ==
Chart performance for "I'll Be Your Angel"
Chart (2003)	Peak position
Australia (ARIA)	69
Belgium (Ultratop 50 Flanders)	15
Netherlands (Single Top 100)	59
UK Singles (OCC)	9
