= Original Pirate Material =

Studio album by the Streets
- Released: 25 March 2002
- Recorded: 2001–2002
- Studios: Mike Skinner's house, Brixton, London
- Genres: Alternative hip-hop; electronica; UK garage; 2-step garage
- Length: 47:24
- Labels: Locked On; 679
- Producer: Mike Skinner

The Streets chronology
Original Pirate Material (2002)	All Got Our Runnins (2003)

Singles from Original Pirate Material
- 1. "Has It Come to This?" Released: 8 October 2001; 2. "Let's Push Things Forward" Released: 15 April 2002; 3. "Weak Become Heroes" Released: 22 July 2002; 4. "Don't Mug Yourself" Released: 21 October 2002

Original Pirate Material is the debut studio album by the English hip-hop project the Streets, released on 25 March 2002. Recorded mostly in a room in a south London house rented at the time by principal member Mike Skinner, the album is musically influenced by UK garage and American hip-hop, while its lyrics tell stories of British working-class life. It was supported by four singles: "Has It Come to This?", "Let's Push Things Forward", "Weak Become Heroes", and "Don't Mug Yourself".

The album originally rose to number 12 on the UK Albums Chart in 2002, and then peaked at number 10 in 2004 following the release of the chart-topping second Streets album A Grand Don't Come for Free. It re-entered several charts in April 2022, following its reissue on orange vinyl for 2022's Record Store Day. Original Pirate Material received widespread critical acclaim, with many reviewers praising the originality and humour of Skinner's lyrics, and subsequent critics' polls have placed it among the best albums of the 2000s.

== Background ==
Skinner has stated that his main early influences were from the United States, in particular Wu-Tang Clan rappers such as Raekwon and RZA, as well as East Coast rapper Nas's album Illmatic. However, Skinner attributes the album as emerging from the UK garage scene of the late 1990s. His stance when making the album was to combine the UK garage sound with a lyrical content about "all the little adventures you go on" rather than the style of UK hip-hop, which he accused of being "someone from Reading pretending to be Biggie or Q-Tip".

Journalist Simon Reynolds identified the album's lyrical content as capturing UK garage's "submerged reality" as a genre not based in nightclubs. Outside London in the late 1990s, UK garage was rarely played in clubs but was instead found on pirate radio stations, reflected by the album's title.

== Recording ==
Recording for Original Pirate Material lasted over a year, with Skinner recording the bulk of the album in the room he was renting in a house in Brixton in south London. The instrumental tracks were created on an IBM ThinkPad, while Skinner used an emptied out wardrobe as a vocal booth using duvets and mattresses to reduce echo. Direct influences on the album included the 2000 film Gladiator, which inspired the lyrics of "Turn the Page", the opening track of the album. He eschewed analogue recording equipment and recorded and mixed the album entirely on Logic Pro, a digital audio workstation.

== Artwork ==
The cover artwork depicts the south face of the Kestrel House tower block on City Road, London at night. The photo was taken in 1995 by German photographer Rut Blees Luxemburg using an eight-minute exposure.

== Critical reception ==
Professional ratings
Aggregate scores
Source	Rating
Metacritic	90/100
Review scores
Source	Rating
AllMusic	5/5 stars
Blender	4/5 stars
Entertainment Weekly	A
The Guardian	4/5 stars
NME	4/5
Pitchfork	7.9/10
Rolling Stone	4/5 stars
Spin	8/10
Uncut	5/5 stars
The Village Voice	A−

Original Pirate Material was hailed by the British music press upon its release. NME said that the album "represents a brilliant break with cliché ... [Skinner is] one of the most original pop voices for years... By turns dark, funny and heartbreaking, the songs on Original Pirate Material are snapshots of ordinary life as a young Midlands resident, set to innovative two-step production: tales of love, going out, being skint, getting drunk, and eating chips. It's Streets by name, and streets by nature, and it's great." Q called Skinner a "vital new voice" and described Original Pirate Material as "starkly observed vignettes ... this debut wittily and wisely documents young lives spent in piss-poor pubs, estate bedrooms and kebab shops... It could easily, but somehow never does, degenerate into the kind of 'street poet' blather TV news editors think spices up election coverage." Mojo said that Skinner "favours a winningly downbeat brand of urban realism, set to minimal, pounding drums ... A lot of his urban vignettes fall somewhere between "The Message" and the Specials' "Ghost Town". But their very ordinariness and the brutish, unadorned simplicity of the music is part of their appeal, evoking the everyday tedium of real 'youth culture' ... A uniquely British voice." Spin said, "Mike Skinner ... could be the most gifted rapper London has ever produced, except that he doesn't really rap – he pontificates, spins spoken-word yarns, and kicks running commentary. Hip-hop – and Britain's equally bling-fixated 2-step-garage scene – has shaped Skinner's sound, but he's too earnest to reproduce their bluster. He's an observant, asphalt-level 'geezer' – Brit slang for everyman – set apart by the sharpness of his lens, not the force of his flow. On Original Pirate Material, Skinner nails the quiet desperation of the white working class like a pub-hooligan Marshall Mathers, with all of Slim Shady's good humor and none of his insanity."

Contemporary reviews for the album commented on its DIY aesthetic and lyricism. Stylus Magazine said that the album "combines the boy-next-door DIY of US garage rock with the sound of UK garage and displays an alchemic ability to turn the humdrum of everyday life into a record that is at times empowering, hilarious, melancholy, awkward, and charming."

=== Accolades ===
Since its release in 2002, Original Pirate Material has received several accolades. In March 2003, NME placed Original Pirate Material at number 46 on their list of the "100 Best Albums of All Time". They subsequently placed the album at number nine in their list of the "100 Best Albums of the Decade". Observer Music Monthly ranked it as the best album of the 2000s. Journalist Simon Reynolds also placed the album at the top of his list of his favourite albums of the 2000s, with a "special 'in a class of its own' award". Pitchfork placed the album at number ten on their list of the top 100 albums of 2000–2004; they later placed it at number 36 on their list of the top 200 albums of the 2000s. In 2022, Rolling Stone ranked the album 139th in their list of The 200 Greatest Hip-Hop Albums of All Time.

== Track listing ==
All tracks are written by Mike Skinner.

No.	Title	Length
1.	"Turn the Page"	3:15
2.	"Has It Come to This?"	4:04
3.	"Let's Push Things Forward" (featuring Kevin Mark Trail)	3:51
4.	"Sharp Darts"	1:33
5.	"Same Old Thing" (featuring Kevin Mark Trail)	3:22
6.	"Geezers Need Excitement"	3:46
7.	"It's Too Late"	4:10
8.	"Too Much Brandy"	3:02
9.	"Don't Mug Yourself"	2:39
10.	"Who Got the Funk?"	1:50
11.	"The Irony of It All"	3:29
12.	"Weak Become Heroes"	5:33
13.	"Who Dares Wins"	0:34
14.	"Stay Positive"	6:16

== Charts ==
=== Weekly charts ===
2002 weekly chart performance for Original Pirate Material
Chart (2002)	Peak position
Australian Albums (ARIA)	57
French Albums (SNEP)	97
Norwegian Albums (VG-lista)	10
New Zealand Albums (RMNZ)	36
Swedish Albums (Sverigetopplistan)	43
UK Albums (Official Charts)	12

2004 weekly chart performance for Original Pirate Material
Chart (2004)	Peak position
UK Albums (Official Charts)	10

2022 weekly chart performance for Original Pirate Material
Chart (2022)	Peak position
German Albums (Offizielle Top 100)	93
Scottish Albums (Official Charts)	15
UK Independent Albums (Official Charts)	5
UK R&B Albums (Official Charts)	1

=== Year-end charts ===
Chart (2002)	Position
UK Albums (OCC)	75
Chart (2003)	Position
UK Albums (OCC)	113
Chart (2004)	Position
UK Albums (OCC)	142

== Certifications ==
Region	Certification	Certified units/sales
Australia (ARIA)	Gold	35,000^{^}
United Kingdom (BPI)	2× Platinum	600,000^{^}
^{^} Shipments figures based on certification alone.

== Release history ==
Region	Date	Label	Format	Catalog
United Kingdom & Europe	25 March 2002	Locked On Records/679 Recordings	double LP	679003TLP
United Kingdom & Europe	25 March 2002	Locked On Records/679 Recordings	CD	679003CDLP
Japan	3 July 2002	Warner Music Japan(ワーナーミュージック・ジャパン)	CD	WPCR-11232
United States	22 October 2002	VICE Music/Atlantic Records	double LP	93181-1
United States	22 October 2002	VICE Music/Atlantic Records	CD	93181-2

== Bibliography ==
- Skinner, Mike (2012). The Story of The Streets. London, England: Bantam Press. ISBN 978-0-5930-6807-6.
