= E. 1999 Eternal =

Studio album by Bone Thugs-n-Harmony
- Released: July 25, 1995
- Studio: Trax Recording Studio (Hollywood, Los Angeles)
- Genres: Midwest hip-hop; gangsta rap; horrorcore; G-funk
- Length: 68:04
- Labels: Ruthless; Relativity
- Producers: Eazy-E (exec.); DJ U-Neek; Tony C; Kenny McCloud

Bone Thugs-n-Harmony chronology
| Creepin on ah Come Up (1994) | E. 1999 Eternal (1995) | The Art of War (1997) |

Singles from E. 1999 Eternal
- 1. "1st of tha Month" Released: August 11, 1995; 2. "East 1999" Released: 1995; 3. "Tha Crossroads" Released: April 23, 1996

E. 1999 Eternal is the second album by American hip-hop group Bone Thugs-n-Harmony, released July 25, 1995, on Ruthless Records. The album was released four months after the death of gangsta rapper Eazy-E, the group's mentor and the executive producer of the album. Both the album and single "Tha Crossroads" are dedicated to him. Following up on the surprise success of their breakthrough single "Thuggish Ruggish Bone", it became a popular album and received positive reviews from music critics, earning praise for the group's melodic rapping style. The album title is a portmanteau of Cleveland's eastside neighborhood centering on East 99th Street and St. Clair Avenue where the group is based and the then-future year 1999.

The album sold 307,000 copies in the first week. E. 1999 Eternal became the group's best-selling album, with four million copies sold in the United States. It debuted at number one on the US Billboard 200 and topped the chart for two consecutive weeks. The album was nominated for the inaugural Grammy Award for Best Rap Album, ultimately losing to Naughty by Nature's Poverty's Paradise at the 1996 Grammy Awards. In 2015, the group toured in support of the 20th anniversary of the album, performing it in its entirety for the first time.

== Commercial performance ==
E.1999 Eternal sold 307,000 copies in its first week and debuted at No. 1 on the Billboard 200 and Top R&B/Hip Hop Albums charts. It remained at No. 1 in its second week on both charts, selling 222,000 copies. In its third week, E.1999 Eternal dropped to number 2 on the Billboard 200, behind Hootie & the Blowfish's Cracked Rear View, selling 162,000 copies. The album sold 123,000 copies in its fourth week and got outsold by The Show: The Soundtrack, dropping to No. 5 on the Billboard 200 and No. 2 on Top R&B/Hip-Hop Albums.

== Critical reception ==
Professional ratings
Review scores
| Source | Rating |
|---|---|
| AllMusic | 4.5/5 stars |
| Entertainment Weekly | B− |
| The Guardian | 4/5 stars |
| Los Angeles Times | 3.5/4 stars |
| NME | 8/10 |
| Q | 5/5 stars |
| Rolling Stone | 3/5 stars |
| The Rolling Stone Album Guide | 4/5 stars |
| The Source | 3.5/5 stars |
| The Village Voice | C |

Upon release, E. 1999 Eternal met with critical acclaim. Cheo H. Coker of the Los Angeles Times wrote, "This Cleveland-based quartet has raised the stakes of the gangsta rap game, not only in terms of pure, gritty excess, but also in rhyme-style, cadence and delivery. Bone isn’t content to just shoot at that next emcee or punk in their neighborhood; they’ll harmonize about it too, mixing graphic imagery with old-fashioned street-corner crooning. Essentially, this is a West Coast-style dancehall record, complete with heavy-looped bass lines, electronic gunshots, warped-out dub sounds and fast-paced rhyming style mixed with harmonizing that the Jamaicans call sing-jeh. No change in subject matter: just bloody shoot-’em braggadocio, laced with ominous piano samples. This is the kind of album that starts out good and gets better with repeated listenings—as the dark, subliminal references clear up. Easily one of the most worthwhile rap purchases of the year."

Retrospectively, Jason Birchmeier of AllMusic described E. 1999 Eternal as such: "Following the surprise success of Bone Thugs-N-Harmony's summer 1994 anthem "Thuggish Ruggish Bone," the group returned a year later with E. 1999 Eternal, an impressive debut full-length that dismisses any notion that the group was merely a one-hit wonder. From beginning to end, the album maintains a consistent tone, one that's menacing and somber, produced entirely by DJ U-Neek, a Los Angeles-based producer who frames the songs with dark, smoked-out G-funk beats and synth melodies." The Source hailed E. 1999 Eternal as one of The Top 100 Rap Albums of The 1990s.

In a second thought review in Stylus Magazine, the album was described as "Lyrically speaking, Bone Thugs have much in common with countless mainstream rap acts. The themes running throughout E. 1999 Eternal are familiar—drugs, violent crime and death make regular appearances. It's the manner in which the lyrics are framed and delivered that makes the group such a bizarre proposition. Bone Thugs had a melodic flow—frequently delivered in unison—that bordered on singing. They could rap together at a lightning fast pace, without losing their sweetness." Stylus also praised producer DJ U-Neek for his production style on the album, stating: "The album was entirely produced by DJ U-Neek (although he did collaborate on some tracks), endowing cohesiveness to the unique Bone Thugs sound. U-Neek was, like the vocal group members of Bone Thugs, unorthodox in the rap field. It wouldn't be far off to describe him as a songwriter as well as a producer. He was always keen to flesh out interesting sounds—usually based around rumbling piano chords, mellotron and synthesised strings. Yet, the focus was largely on song craft and melody—the album frequently strays into gloomy territory, but never loses its sense of tunefulness. The beats were not particularly striking—usually low-key and sluggish, but the album's strengths are not rhythm-related."

== Track listing ==
| No. | Title | Writer(s) | Producer(s) | Length |
|---|---|---|---|---|
| 1. | "Da Introduction" | Bone; DJ U-Neek; Tony Hester | DJ U-Neek | 4:28 |
| 2. | "East 1999" | Bone; U-Neek; Tony-C | U-Neek; Tony-C^{[a]} | 4:24 |
| 3. | "Eternal" | Bone; U-Neek; Tony-C | U-Neek; Tony-C^{[a]}; Kenny McCloud^{[a]} | 4:06 |
| 4. | "Crept & We Came" | Bone; U-Neek | U-Neek; Tony-C^{[a]} | 5:06 |
| 5. | "Down '71 (The Getaway)" | Bone; U-Neek; Tony-C | U-Neek | 4:52 |
| 6. | "Mr. Bill Collector" | Bone; U-Neek; Tony-C | U-Neek; Tony-C^{[a]} | 5:04 |
| 7. | "Budsmokers Only" | Bone; U-Neek; Tony-C | U-Neek | 3:34 |
| 8. | "Tha Crossroads" | Bone; U-Neek; Tony-C | U-Neek; Tony-C^{[a]} | 3:32 |
| 9. | "Me Killa (Skit)" | Bone; U-Neek | U-Neek; McCloud^{[a]} | 0:58 |
| 10. | "Land of tha Heartless" | Bone; U-Neek; McCloud | U-Neek; Bone^{[a]} | 3:08 |
| 11. | "No Shorts, No Losses" | Bone; U-Neek; McCloud | U-Neek; Bone^{[a]} | 4:54 |
| 12. | "1st of tha Month" | Bone; U-Neek; Michael Powell | U-Neek | 5:15 |
| 13. | "Buddah Lovaz" | Bone; U-Neek; Tony-C | U-Neek; Tony-C^{[a]} | 4:43 |
| 14. | "Die Die Die" | Bone; U-Neek | U-Neek | 2:51 |
| 15. | "Mr. Quija 2 (Skit)" | Bone; U-Neek | U-Neek; Bone^{[a]} | 1:19 |
| 16. | "Mo' Murda" (only found in explicit version) | Bone; U-Neek; Tony-C | U-Neek; Tony-C^{[a]} | 5:47 |
| 17. | "Shotz to tha Double Glock" (feat. Tony Tone, Tombstone, Mo! Hart, Boogie Nikke, Sin & Sage; only found in explicit version) | Bone; U-Neek; Poetic Hustla'z; Graveyard Shift; McCloud | U-Neek; McCloud^{[a]} | 4:44 |

Reissue bonus tracks
| No. | Title | Writer(s) | Producer(s) | Length |
|---|---|---|---|---|
| 18. | "Tha Crossroads (DJ U-Neek's Mo Thug Remix)" | Bone; U-Neek; Tony-C | U-Neek; Tony-C^{[a]} | 3:46 |

Notes

- ^{^a} signifies a co-producer
- "Buddah Lovaz" transitions into "Die Die Die".
- "Die Die Die" transitions into "Mr. Quija 2".

=== Samples ===
| # | Title | Samples |
|---|---|---|
| 1. | "Da Introduction" | "In The Rain" by The Dramatics |
| 3. | "Eternal" | "Character Bios Theme" from Eternal Champions by Andy Armer |
| 7. | "Budsmokers Only" | "Reasons" by Earth, Wind & Fire |
| 8. | "Crossroad” | "Bad Ending Theme" from Eternal Champions by Andy Armer |
| 9. | "Me Killa (Skit)" | "I Will Follow Him" by Little Peggy March |
| 12. | "1st of tha Month" | "I Just Wanna Be Your Girl" by Chapter 8 |
| 13. | "Buddah Lovaz" | "Choosey Lover" by The Isley Brothers and "Right and a Wrong way" by Keith Sweat |
| 14. | "Die Die Die" | "Breakthrough" by Isaac Hayes |
| 16. | "Mo Murda" | "I'd Rather Be With You" by Bootsy's Rubber Band |
| 18. | "Tha Crossroads" | "Make Me Say It Again Girl Part 1 & 2" by The Isley Brothers |

=== Appearances ===
- Krayzie Bone appears on all tracks.
- Layzie Bone appears on 17 tracks.
- Bizzy Bone appears on 17 tracks.
- Wish Bone appears on 14 tracks.
- Flesh-n-Bone appears on 5 tracks.

== Personnel ==
- Eric "Eazy-E" Wright - Executive Producer, Album Concept
- D.J. U-Neek - Producer, Recording
- Layzie Bone - Producer
- Anne Catalino - Engineer
- Aaron Connor - Engineer and Recording
- Don Cunningham - Design and Art Direction
- Tony Cowan - Recording
- Madeleine Smith - Sample Clearance
- Quentin Frost - Album Cover

== Charts ==
=== Weekly charts ===
| Chart (1995–1996) | Peak position |
|---|---|
| Australian Albums (ARIA) | 48 |
| Belgian Albums (Ultratop Wallonia) | 48 |
| Canada Top Albums/CDs (RPM) | 14 |
| Dutch Albums (Album Top 100) | 13 |
| German Albums (Offizielle Top 100) | 29 |
| New Zealand Albums (RMNZ) | 10 |
| Norwegian Albums (VG-lista) | 21 |
| Swedish Albums (Sverigetopplistan) | 34 |
| Swiss Albums (Schweizer Hitparade) | 34 |
| UK Albums (Official Charts) | 39 |
| US Billboard 200 | 1 |
| US Top R&B/Hip-Hop Albums (Billboard) | 1 |

=== Year-end charts ===
| Chart (1996) | Position |
|---|---|
| New Zealand Albums (RMNZ) | 32 |
| US Billboard 200 | 16 |
| US Top R&B/Hip-Hop Albums (Billboard) | 10 |

| Chart (1995) | Position |
|---|---|
| US Billboard 200 | 35 |
| US Top R&B/Hip-Hop Albums | 5 |
| Chart (1997) | Position |
| US Billboard 200 | 113 |

=== Decade-end charts ===
| Chart (1990–1999) | Position |
|---|---|
| US Billboard 200 | 54 |

== Certifications ==
| Region | Certification | Certified units/sales |
|---|---|---|
| Canada (Music Canada) | Platinum | 100,000^{^} |
| New Zealand (RMNZ) | Platinum | 15,000^{^} |
| United Kingdom (BPI) | Gold | 100,000^{^} |
| United States (RIAA) | 4× Platinum | 4,000,000^{^} |
^{^} Shipments figures based on certification alone.
