= Flip Reverse =

2003 single by Blazin' Squad

Single by Blazin' Squad

from the album Now or Never
- B-side: "Nothing Like This"; "Who's It Gonna Be"; "U Know What"
- Released: 3 November 2003
- Recorded: 2003
- Genre: Hip hop, R&B
- Length: 2:53
- Label: East West Records
- Songwriters: Lee Collin Bailey, Stuart Baker, Christian Ballard, Thomas Nicholas Beasley, Samuel David Foulkes, Oliver Constantine Georgiou, James Victor MacKenzie, Christopher James McKeckney, Andrew Ian Murray, James Terrence Murray, Mustafa Omer, Marcel Stephen Elliot Somerville, Jane Vaughan

Blazin' Squad singles chronology
| "We Just Be Dreamin'" (2003) | "Flip Reverse" (2003) | "Here 4 One" (2004) |

"Flip Reverse" is a song by ten-piece hip-hop group Blazin' Squad, released as the second single from their second studio album, Now or Never.

== Background ==
Although, initially against releasing the song as a single, East West released "Flip Reverse" as the second single from Now or Never on 3 November 2003. It became the group's last single to be released on the discontinued cassette format. Released a week prior to Now or Never, the single peaked at #2 on the UK Singles Chart on the week of release. The radio edit of "Flip Reverse" cuts around twenty seconds of instrumental music from the intersection of the song.

== Music video ==
The music video for "Flip Reverse" premiered in September 2003, at a total length of two minutes and fifty-six seconds. The video focuses on the group performing the song in a crowded club, surrounded by a group of girls. The video also shows scenes of members of the band break dancing, and leaving the club with a gaggle of girls following behind. As of 2012, "Flip Reverse" has become the group's most-played video on UK music channels, receiving nearly twice as many plays as "Crossroads", the group's only number-one single.

== Track listing ==
- Digital single
1. "Flip Reverse" (Original Edit) - 3:13
2. "Nothing Like This" - 3:36
3. "Who's It Gonna Be?" - 3:15
- UK CD #1
1. "Flip Reverse" (Original Edit) - 3:13
2. "Nothing Like This" - 3:36
3. "Who's It Gonna Be?" - 3:15
4. "Flip Reverse" (CD-Rom Video) - 2:55
5. "Flip Reverse" (Making of the Video) (CD-Rom Video) - 1:58
- UK CD #2
1. "Flip Reverse" (Radio Edit) - 2:53
2. "U Know What" - 5:01
3. "Crossroads" (Live) (CD-Rom Video) - 6:52
4. "Interactive Interview" (CD-Rom Video) - 1:37
- UK Cassette
1. "Flip Reverse" (Radio Edit) - 2:53
2. "Who's It Gonna Be?" - 3:15

== Charts ==
| Chart (2003) | Peak position |
|---|---|
| Germany (GfK) | 22 |
| Ireland (IRMA) | 15 |
| Netherlands (Single Top 100) | 44 |
| Scotland (OCC) | 3 |
| UK Singles (OCC) | 2 |
| UK Airplay (Music Week) | 42 |

=== Year-end charts ===
Year-end chart performance for "Flip Reverse"
| Chart (2003) | Position |
|---|---|
| UK Singles (OCC) | 84 |
