= In the Beginning (Blazin' Squad album) =

Studio album by Blazin' Squad
- Released: 25 November 2002
- Recorded: 2002
- Genre: Hip-hop
- Length: 44:58
- Label: East West
- Producer: Cutfather & Joe, Julian Gallagher, Huggy Bear, Richard Stannard, TNT Xplosive

Blazin' Squad chronology
In the Beginning (2002)	Now or Never (2003)

Singles from In the Beginning
- 1. "Crossroads" Released: 19 August 2002; 2. "Love on the Line" Released: 11 November 2002; 3. "Reminisce" / "Where the Story Ends" Released: 10 February 2003

In the Beginning is the debut studio album by British ten-piece hip-hop group Blazin' Squad. The album was released on 25 November 2002 in the United Kingdom through East West Records. It peaked at number 33 on the UK Albums Chart. The album contains the top 10 singles "Crossroads", "Love on the Line" and the double A-side "Reminisce" / "Where the Story Ends". The album features the radio edit of "Crossroads", running at 3:10, instead of the full-length version, which runs at 3:50.

== Track listing ==
No.	Title	Writer(s)	Producer(s)	Length
1.	"I Understand"	Silky, Soulshock & Karlin	Cutfather & Joe	3:51
2.	"Love on the Line"	Christian Ballard, Russ Ballard, Andrew Murray	Cutfather & Joe	3:45
3.	"Crossroads"	O'Kelly Isley, Jr., Marvin Isley, Ronald Isley, Rudolph Isley, Ernie Isley, Chris Jasper, Bryon McCane II, Charles Scruggs, Anthony Henderson, Steven Howse	Cutfather & Joe, TNT Xplosive^{[a]}	3:10
4.	"All About the Music"	Blazin' Squad, Richard Stannard, Lalo Schifrin, Julian Gallagher, Pete Davis	Stannard, Gallagher	5:20
5.	"The Love Song"	Blazin' Squad, Stannard, Caan Woods, Gallagher, Davis	Stannard, Gallagher	4:04
6.	"I Belong to You (Every Time I See Your Face)"	Jerome Woods, Gerald Baillergeau, Victor Merritt	Cutfather & Joe	3:42
7.	"Standard Flow"	Blazin' Squad, Tapps Bandawe, Terry McLeod	TNT Xplosive	4:02
8.	"Reminisce"	Blazin' Squad, Bandawe, McLeod, René Campbell	TNT Xplosive, Huggy Bear, Cutfather & Joe^{[b]}	4:03
9.	"Supastar"	Eshraque Mughal, Clifton Cole	Cutfather & Joe	3:41
10.	"Where the Story Ends"	Blazin' Squad, Stannard, Gallagher, Dave Morgan	Stannard, Gallagher	4:40

=== Special edition ===
Disc 1
No.	Title	Writer(s)	Producer(s)	Length
1.	"I Understand"	Silky, Soulshock & Karlin	Cutfather & Joe	3:51
2.	"Love on the Line"	Christian Ballard, Russ Ballard, Andrew Murray	Cutfather & Joe	3:45
3.	"Crossroads"	O'Kelly Isley, Jr., Marvin Isley, Ronald Isley, Rudolph Isley, Ernie Isley, Chris Jasper, Bryon McCane II, Charles Scruggs, Anthony Henderson, Steven Howse	Cutfather & Joe, TNT Xplosive^{[a]}	3:10
4.	"All About the Music"	Blazin' Squad, Richard Stannard, Lalo Schifrin, Julian Gallagher, Pete Davis	Stannard, Gallagher	5:20
5.	"The Love Song"	Blazin' Squad, Stannard, Caan Woods, Gallagher, Davis	Stannard, Gallagher	4:04
6.	"I Belong to You (Every Time I See Your Face)"	Jerome Woods, Gerald Baillergeau, Victor Merritt	Cutfather & Joe	3:42
7.	"Standard Flow"	Blazin' Squad, Tapps Bandawe, Terry McLeod	TNT Xplosive	4:02
8.	"Reminisce"	Blazin' Squad, Bandawe, McLeod, René Campbell	TNT Xplosive, Huggy Bear, Cutfather & Joe^{[b]}	4:03
9.	"Supastar"	Eshraque Mughal, Clifton Cole	Cutfather & Joe	3:41
10.	"Riders"	Blazin' Squad, Richard Stannard, Gallagher, Davis, Woods	Stannard, Gallagher	4:10
11.	"Where the Story Ends"	Blazin' Squad, Stannard, Gallagher, Dave Morgan	Stannard, Gallagher	4:40

Disc 2
No.	Title	Writer(s)	Producer(s)	Length
1.	"Love on the Line"	Christian Ballard, Russ Ballard, Andrew Murray	Cutfather & Joe	3:45

Notes

- ^{^[a]} signifies an original producer
- ^{^[b]} signifies a remixer
- "All About the Music" features samples from the recordings "Broken Mirrors", "The Human Fly", "Bamboo Birdcage", "The Big Battle" and "Sampans" by Lalo Schifrin.

== Charts ==
=== Weekly charts ===
Chart (2002)	Peak position
Scottish Albums (OCC)	45
UK Albums (OCC)	33

=== Year-end charts ===
Chart (2002)	Position
UK Albums (OCC)	176

== Certifications ==
Region	Certification	Certified units/sales
United Kingdom (BPI)	Gold	100,000^{^}
^{^} Shipments figures based on certification alone.
