= Love on the Line (Blazin' Squad song) =

Single by Blazin' Squad

from the album In the Beginning
- B-side: "Price to Pay" "In Your Eyes" "Bounce"
- Released: 11 November 2002
- Recorded: 2002; C&J Studios (Copenhagen, Denmark); Eden Studios (London, England)
- Genre: R&B, hip hop
- Length: 3:45
- Label: East West
- Songwriters: Christian Ballard, Andrew Murray, Russ Ballard
- Producer: Cutfather & Joe

Blazin' Squad singles chronology
"Crossroads" (2002)	"Love on the Line" (2002)	"Reminisce / Where the Story Ends" (2003)

"Love on the Line" is a song by ten piece hip-hop group Blazin' Squad, released as the second single from their debut studio album, In the Beginning.

== Background ==
"Love on the Line" was one of the first songs recorded for the group's debut album. It was written by Christian Ballard, Andrew Murray, and Russ Ballard, and produced by Danish production duo Cutfather & Joe. The main version of the song features samples from the hit single "Freak Me" by Another Level, which Cutfather & Joe also produced. "Love on the Line" was released as the album's second single on 11 November 2002. It was not as successful as the group's debut single "Crossroads", however, it still managed to peak at No. 6 on the UK Singles Chart.

== Music video ==
The music video for "Love on the Line" premiered in September 2002. The video lasts for a total length of three minutes and fifty-two seconds. The video follows a very similar format to the video for the preceding single "Crossroads". The video depicts the band performing the song in and around a London council estate, and on an abandoned industrial estate. It also depicts scenes of a girl who members of the band are attempting to chat up.

== Track listing ==
- Digital single
1. "Love on the Line" – 3:45
2. "Bounce" – 4:55
- UK CD #1
1. "Love on the Line" – 3:45
2. "Bounce" – 4:55
3. "Love on the Line" (CD-Rom Video) – 3:45
- UK CD #2
1. "Love on the Line" – 3:45
2. "Price to Pay" – 4:03
3. "In Your Eyes" – 3:43
- Cassette
1. "Love on the Line" – 3:45
2. "Bounce" – 4:55

== Personnel ==
- Songwriting – Christian Ballard, Andrew Murray, Russ Ballard
- Production – Cutfather & Joe
- Mixing – Mads Nilsson, Cutfather & Joe
- Recording and programming – Joe Belmaati
- Additional backing vocals – Kristian Lund
- Keyboards – Joe Belmaati, Andrew Murray
- Percussion – Mich Hedin Hansen
- Additional percussion – Christian Ballard

== Charts ==
Chart (2002)	Peak position
Ireland (IRMA)	28
UK Singles (Official Charts)	6

=== Year-end charts ===
Chart (2002)	Position
UK Singles (OCC)	144
