= All Night Long (Blazin' Squad song) =

Single by Blazin' Squad
- B-side: "Whoa"
- Released: 10 June 2006
- Recorded: 2005
- Genre: Hip hop
- Length: 3:02
- Label: Peach
- Songwriter(s): Stuart Baker; Christian Ballard; Samuel David Foulkes; Christopher James McKeckney; Obi Simbarashe Mhondera; George Mondera; Andrew Murray; Marcel Stephen; Elliot Somerville

Blazin' Squad singles chronology
"One More Night Alone" (2006)	"All Night Long" (2006)	"Let's Start Again" (2009)

"All Night Long" is a song by a four-piece version of hip-hop group Blazin' Squad, released as a single on June 10, 2006.

== Background ==
In May 2006, it was announced that Rocky-B, Reepa, Spike-E and Melo-D were going to reform, and perform as a four-piece version of Blazin' Squad. They also announced they were to release a new album under new record label, Peach Records. Under Peach Records, they released their first single since reforming, "All Night Long", in June 2006. The single was very popular on underground music channels, but did not receive a lot of mainstream airplay. As such, the single peaked at #54 on the UK Singles Chart, which resulted in their record deal being scrapped and a further disbandment. The track was not included on any of the group's albums until the release of their Greatest Hits compilation in June 2009.

== Music video ==
The music video for "All Night Long" did not premiere until August 2006, two months after the release of the single, at a total length of two-minutes and fifty-seconds. The video is very similar to the video for the group's previous single "We Just Be Dreamin'". It features the four band members performing the song around a swimming pool, surrounded by a gaggle of girls dressed in bikinis and other sexy outfits. The music video received airplay on Starz and Channel AKA, but was never placed on rotation by MTV.

== Track listing ==
- Digital EP
1. "All Night Long" (Radio Edit) - 3:02
2. "Whoa!" - 2:56
3. "All Night Long" (Si Hulbert's Funkin' Great Mix) - 3:15
4. "All Night Long" (Platinum Hit The Floor Remix) - 3:40
- UK CD #1
1. "All Night Long" (Radio Edit) - 3:02
2. "Whoa!" - 2:56
- UK CD #2
1. "All Night Long" (Radio Edit) - 3:02
2. "All Night Long" (Si Hulbert's Funkin' Great Mix) - 3:15
3. "All Night Long" (Platinum Hit The Floor Remix) - 3:40
4. "All Night Long" (Video) - 3:02

== Charts ==
Chart (2006	Peak position
UK Singles (OCC)	54
