= One More Night Alone =

2006 single by Friday Hill

Single by Friday Hill

from the album Times Like These
- B-side: "Go"; "Back on Your Feet"
- Released: 13 February 2006
- Length: 4:11
- Label: Longside
- Songwriters: Simon Perry; David Thomas; Nicky Chinn; James Murray; James McKenzie; Mustafa Omer
- Producer: Simon Perry

Friday Hill singles chronology
"Baby Goodbye" (2005)	"One More Night Alone" (2006)	"All Night Long" (2006)

"One More Night Alone" is a song by pop trio Friday Hill, released as the second and final single from their debut studio album, Times Like These, on 13 February 2006. Despite being released under the name Friday Hill, the song is included as part of Blazin' Squad's discography. Upon its release, the song reached No. 13 on the UK Singles Chart.

== Background and release ==
Following the split of ten-piece hip-hop group Blazin' Squad, band members Strider, Flava, and Kenzie were offered a record deal by Polydor records, to form as a trio and record an album together. The trio originally expressed the intention to continue performing as Blazin' Squad, however, due to licensing rights, the name was not available. As such, they decided to form under the name Friday Hill, which was created based around the trio's hometown of Chingford. The song is very much a departure from Blazin' Squad's style of music, but was still successful commercially. Released on 13 February 2006, the single peaked at No. 13 on the UK Singles Chart, becoming the group's worst-performing single to date. As such, the group were subsequently dropped by their record label. Later that year, four members of the original Blazin' Squad reformed under the original band name, and subsequently released the group's next single, "All Nite Long".

== Music video ==
The music video for "One More Night Alone" premiered in December 2005, at a total length of three minutes and thirty-two seconds. The video follows each of the band members through a day in their life, including scenes of each of the group waking up, exercising, talking to girls and then going to bed. The final scenes of the video feature the group walking along a river embankment whilst performing the final lyrics of the song.

== Track listings ==
- UK CD1
1. "One More Night Alone" (radio mix)
2. "Go"
- UK CD2
1. "One More Night Alone" (full length mix)
2. "One More Night Alone" (acoustic version)
3. "Baby Goodbye" (instrumental)
4. "Back on Your Feet"
5. "One More Night Alone" (video)

== Personnel ==
Personnel are lifted from the UK CD1 liner notes.

- Simon Perry – writing, production
- David Thomas – writing, programming, mixing
- Nicky Chinn – writing
- Flava – writing (as James Murray)
- Kenzie – writing (as James McKenzie)
- Strider – writing (as Mustafa Omer)
- Glenn Skinner – mixing

== Charts ==
Chart (2006)	Peak position
Ireland (IRMA)	19
Scottish Singles Sales (Official Charts)	5
UK Singles (Official Charts)	13
