= 1st of tha Month =

1995 single by Bone Thugs-n-Harmony

Single by Bone Thugs-n-Harmony

from the album E. 1999 Eternal
- B-side: "Die Die Die"
- Released: August 11, 1995
- Genre: G-funk; hip hop; R&B
- Length: 4:52
- Label: Ruthless; Relativity
- Songwriters: Bryon McCane; DJ U-Neek; Michael Powell; Wish Bone; Layzie Bone; Krayzie Bone
- Producer: DJ U-Neek

Bone Thugs-n-Harmony singles chronology
"The Points" (1995)	"1st of tha Month" (1995)	"East 1999" (1995)

Music video
- "1st of tha Month" on YouTube

"1st of tha Month" is the first single by American hip-hop group Bone Thugs-n-Harmony from their second studio album, E. 1999 Eternal (1995). The song peaked at number 14 on the US Billboard Hot 100, becoming their first top-20 single, and later was nominated for a Grammy Award in 1996. It was certified gold by the Recording Industry Association of America (RIAA) for shipments of 500,000 copies.

== Track listing ==
1. "1st of tha Month" (radio edit)
2. "1st of tha Month" (radio edit)
3. "1st of tha Month" (album version)
4. "1st of tha Month" (instrumental)
5. "1st of tha Month" (a cappella)
6. "Die Die Die" (album version)

== Charts ==
=== Weekly charts ===
Chart (1995–1996)	Peak position
Europe (European Dance Radio)	24
Netherlands (Dutch Top 40 Tipparade)	5
Netherlands (Single Top 100)	46
New Zealand (Recorded Music NZ)	7
Scottish Singles Sales (Official Charts)	37
UK Singles (Official Charts)	15
UK Hip Hop/R&B (Official Charts)	3
US Billboard Hot 100	14
US Hot Rap Songs (Billboard)	4
US Hot R&B/Hip-Hop Songs (Billboard)	12
US Rhythmic Airplay (Billboard)	10
US Cash Box Top 100	13

=== Year-end charts ===
Chart (1995)	Position
New Zealand (RIANZ)	36
US Billboard Hot 100	89
US Hot R&B Singles (Billboard)	76

== Certifications ==
Region	Certification	Certified units/sales
New Zealand (RMNZ)	Platinum	30,000^{‡}
United States (RIAA)	Gold	500,000^{^}
^{^} Shipments figures based on certification alone.^{‡} Sales+streaming figures based on certification alone.

== Release history ==
Region	Date	Format(s)	Label(s)	Ref.
United States	August 11, 1995	12-inch vinyl; CD; cassette	Ruthless; Relativity	
Australia	September 11, 1995	CD; cassette	Ruthless	
United Kingdom	October 23, 1995	12-inch vinyl; CD; cassette	Epic; Ruthless	
