= Don't Mug Yourself =

Single by The Streets

from the album Original Pirate Material
- Released: 21 October 2002 (UK)
- Recorded: 2002
- Genre: Drum and bass, hip hop
- Length: 2:40
- Label: Locked On
- Songwriter: Mike Skinner
- Producer: Mike Skinner

The Streets singles chronology
"Weak Become Heroes" (2002)	"Don't Mug Yourself" (2002)	"Fit but You Know It" (2004)

"Don't Mug Yourself" is a song by English rapper and producer Mike Skinner under the music project the Streets. It was released in October 2002 as the fourth and final single from their debut studio album, Original Pirate Material. It reached number 21 in the UK Singles Chart.

== Background and writing ==
Skinner told NME how the song was created: "I left it really late – the night before I was supposed to be cutting it, I still hadn’t recorded it," he said. "I had to get away from it because my head was really clouded. So I went out to watch a film (Monsoon Wedding) and Calvin came along with a bottle of rum. We drank the bottle in the cinema, then went to a bar and ended up getting really, really smashed. We got back to my house and Calvin heard the instrumental and he was like 'I want to be on this tune'. He’s not a singer, he’s just my mate."

== Track listing ==
=== CD 1 ===
1. "Don't Mug Yourself" (Video Edit)
2. "Don't Mug Yourself" (Out Takes)
3. "Streets Score"
4. "Don't Mug Yourself" (Enhanced CD-Rom Video)

=== CD 2 ===
1. "Don't Mug Yourself" (Album Version)
2. "Weak Become Heroes" (Röyksopp's Memory Lane Mix)
3. "Has It Come to This?" (High Contrast 'It's Come to This' Remix)

== Charts ==
Chart (2002)	Peak position
Scottish Singles Sales (Official Charts)	48
UK Singles (Official Charts)	21
UK Hip Hop/R&B (Official Charts)	6
