= Robin Schreiber =

American superfan of Golden State Warriors

- Born: 1949 or 1950 (age 76–77); Oakland, California, U.S.

Robin Schreiber (born 1949 or 1950), better known as Dance Cam Mom or Sweater Mom, is an American superfan of the Golden State Warriors of the National Basketball Association (NBA). A Warriors season ticket holder since the late 1980s, she dances at home games in a blue and gold sweater—the Warriors' team colors. She was often shown dancing in her trademark Christmas sweater on the jumbotron at Oracle Arena, the Warriors' former home arena. She has continued to perform at their new arena, Chase Center.

== Early life and career ==
Schreiber was born in Oakland, California, and her family moved to Belmont when she was six. Her father was a graduate of the University of California, Berkeley, and she grew up rooting for Cal sports with him. In high school, she began watching the Warriors together with her dad.

Schreiber studied art in college and taught history and art in the San Francisco Peninsula before retiring from teaching after 35 years. She became a freelance artist.

== Golden State Warriors ==
Schreiber's Warriors Christmas sweater was purchased after Golden State became NBA champions in 2015. It was originally intended to be a gift for her son, but her husband erroneously purchased it in a women's size. They convinced her to wear it to a game in December 2015, when they pushed her up to dance and she was caught on camera. Schreiber had been shown on the screen over 20 times before becoming a viral sensation after her dance during a Warriors win against the Dallas Mavericks on November 9, 2016, the day after the 2016 U.S. presidential election. She said her performance that night was motivated by the "tough election" and feeling as if people needed to be cheered up. In December, she performed on the court during a break with the Warriors dance team in a holiday routine featuring the dancers in Santa outfits and she in her signature sweater.

TNT flew her out to the 2017 NBA All-Star Weekend in New Orleans, where they filmed her dancing with Golden State player Stephen Curry. After the Warriors won the NBA championship in 2017, NBC Sports invited Schreiber to ride in a bus with other San Francisco Bay Area celebrities behind the Warriors players in their victory parade. In November 2017, Curry wore shoes featuring designs in honor of her and her sweater. In 2018, she appeared on camera at a San Jose Sharks ice hockey game at SAP Center, dancing with their mascot, SJ Sharkie, at her side.
