= I'm in Heaven =

2003 single by Jason Nevins

Single by Jason Nevins presents U.K.N.Y. featuring Holly James
- Released: June 16, 2003
- Length: 3:08
- Label: Ultra
- Songwriters: John Bettis; Steve Porcaro; Jason Nevins
- Producer: Jason Nevins

Jason Nevins singles chronology
"Insane in the Brain" (1999)	"I'm in Heaven" (2003)	"I'm the Main Man" (2003)

"I'm in Heaven" is a song written and produced by American songwriter and producer Jason Nevins under his pseudonym U.K.N.Y., featuring vocals from British singer Holly James. The hook of the song interpolates "Human Nature" by Michael Jackson. "I'm in Heaven" was released as a single on June 16, 2003, in the United States and debuted at number 15 on the first published Billboard Dance Radio Airplay chart that August. Worldwide, the single peaked at number nine on the UK Singles Chart and reached the top 40 in Australia and the Netherlands.

== Track listings ==
US and Canadian maxi-CD single

1. "I'm in Heaven" (radio version)
2. "I'm in Heaven" (club mix)
3. "I'm in Heaven" (dub)

UK CD single

1. "I'm in Heaven" (radio edit) – 3:08
2. "I'm in Heaven" (David Anthony remix) – 3:43
3. "I'm in Heaven" (Motivo vocal remix) – 6:20
4. "I'm in Heaven" (Three Drives vocal remix) – 6:31
5. "I'm in Heaven" (video)

UK cassette single

1. "I'm in Heaven" (radio edit) – 3:08
2. "I'm in Heaven" (David Anthony remix) – 3:43

Australian CD single

1. "I'm in Heaven" (radio edit)
2. "I'm in Heaven" (club mix)
3. "I'm in Heaven" (Motivo vocal remix)
4. "I'm in Heaven" (Three Drives extended vocal remix)

== Charts ==
Chart (2003)	Peak position
Australia (ARIA)	38
Australian Dance (ARIA)	2
Belgium (Ultratip Bubbling Under Flanders)	5
Hungary (Dance Top 40)	40
Ireland Dance (IRMA)	9
Netherlands (Dutch Top 40)	12
Netherlands (Single Top 100)	34
Romania (Romanian Top 100)	70
Scottish Singles Sales (Official Charts)	11
UK Singles (Official Charts)	9
UK Dance (Official Charts)	8
UK Indie (Official Charts)	1
US Dance Radio Airplay (Billboard)	15

== Release history ==
Region	Date	Format(s)	Label(s)	Ref.
United States	June 16, 2003	Contemporary hit; rhythmic contemporary radio	Ultra	
Australia	July 7, 2003	CD	Sony Music Australia	
United Kingdom	August 4, 2003	12-inch vinyl; CD; cassette	free2air	
