= Weak Become Heroes =

Single by the Streets

from the album Original Pirate Material
- Released: 22 July 2002
- Genre: UK garage
- Length: 5:33
- Label: 679
- Songwriter: Mike Skinner

The Streets singles chronology
"Let's Push Things Forward" (2002)	"Weak Become Heroes" (2002)	"Don't Mug Yourself" (2002)

Alternative Covers
- UK CD 2 cover

Alternative cover
- Double A-side cover

Alternative cover
- Remix cover

"Weak Become Heroes" is a song by English rapper and producer Mike Skinner under the music project the Streets. It was released in July 2002 as the third single from their debut studio album, Original Pirate Material.

== Background ==
The song concerns Skinner's experiences of rave culture in the mid-1990s. He says:

The reference I made to Nicky Holloway, Danny Rampling and all that were because I was intelligent enough to find out that those were the guys that started it. So it was 1995, it wasn't '89, even though everyone thinks it was about '89. Which goes to prove that that experience is the same experience that was had for everyone, even though people in 1989 will say it was better in 1989 than it was in 1995. Because I never experienced 1989 but '95 was pretty good.

Skinner also makes reference to the Criminal Justice and Public Order Act 1994, an act which was seen as curtailing the rights of people to host raves.

The character "European Bob" is described by Zadie Smith as an “archetypal figure for our generation” – a derelict raver-cum-sage akin to Peep Show’s Super Hans.

== Music video ==
The video was filmed in the Works Nightclub (later Hippodrome) in Kingston upon Thames, London, with some external shots outside the club in St James's Road in 2002. The club closed in July 2018 and was demolished to make way for luxury apartments.

== Track listings ==
=== CD 1 ===
1. "Weak Become Heroes" (Ashley Beedle's Love Bug Vocal)
2. "Same Old Thing" (Outlaw Breaks Remix)
3. "Same Old Thing" (Morph Resurrection Remix)

=== Double A-side ===
1. "It's Too Late" (Album version)
2. "Weak Become Heroes" (Single edit)
3. "Weak Become Heroes" (Ashley Beedle's Love Bug Vocal)
4. "Weak Become Heroes" (Röyksopp's Memory Lane Mix)
5. "Let's Push Things Forward" (The Streets Remix featuring Roll Deep)

=== Remixes EP ===
1. "Weak Become Heroes" (3 Fans Vocal Rerub, by DJ Swingsett, Takuya Nakamura & Lisa Shaw)
2. "Weak Become Heroes" (3 Fans Dub Rerub, by DJ Swingsett, Takuya Nakamura & Lisa Shaw)
3. "Weak Become Heroes" (Röyksopp's Memory Lane Mix)
4. "Weak Become Heroes"

== Charts ==
Chart (2002)	Peak position
Australia (ARIA)	74
Scottish Singles Sales (Official Charts)	40
UK Singles (Official Charts)	27
