= We Just Be Dreamin' =

2003 single by Blazin' Squad

Single by Blazin' Squad

from the album Now or Never
- B-side: "Made for Me"; "Anything"; "Easy Come Easy Go"
- Released: 23 June 2003
- Recorded: 2003
- Genre: Pop, hip hop, R&B
- Length: 3:28 (Rap Version)
- Label: East West Records
- Songwriters: Blazin' Squad, Murray, Ballard, Denis Ingoldsby, Josh Thompson

Blazin' Squad singles chronology
"Reminisce / Where the Story Ends" (2003)	"We Just Be Dreamin'" (2003)	"Flip Reverse" (2003)

"We Just Be Dreamin' " is a song by ten piece hip-hop group Blazin' Squad, released as the lead single from their second studio album, Now or Never.

== Background ==
Despite the final single from In the Beginning only being released in February 2003, the band quickly began work on their second studio release, and in June 2003, the group released "We Just Be Dreamin'" as the album's lead single. Prior to the single's release, the group's record label East West had been attempting to take the group in a new direction, and as such, two versions of "We Just Be Dreamin' " were recorded, under the working title of "We Dreemin". The first version recorded was a rap version, featuring three different rap verses. The second version was a vocal version, featuring three different vocal performance verses. As the record label were unsure of which version to release, they packaged one version with each of the physical singles. The rap version received more prominent airplay, and was also featured on Now or Never, and in the song's music video. The single was released on June 23, 2003, peaking at #3 on the UK Singles Chart, becoming the group's most successful single since "Crossroads".

== Music video ==
The music video for "We Just Be Dreamin' " premiered in May 2003, at a total length of three minutes and thirty-three seconds. The music video features the rap version of the song. The video was filmed at the Charlton Lido, and features the band performing around the swimming pool, surrounded by a group of girls in bikinis and other sexy outfits. The video also shows scenes inside the main Lido building. The video also shows scenes of a nearby derelict council block, which just weeks after the filming, was demolished to make way for more community facilities.

== Track listing ==
- Digital single
1. "We Just Be Dreamin' " (Vocal Version) - 3:29
2. "Anything" - 3:44
- UK CD #1
1. "We Just Be Dreamin' " (Rap Version) - 3:29
2. "Made For Me" - 4:04
3. "Easy Come Easy Go" - 3:29
4. "We Just Be Dreamin' " (CD-Rom Video) - 3:29
- UK CD #2
1. "We Just Be Dreamin' " (Vocal Version) - 3:29
2. "Anything" - 3:44
3. "Tour Rehearsal Footage" (CD-Rom Video) - 5:11
- Cassette
1. "We Just Be Dreamin' " (Rap Version) - 3:29
2. "Anything" - 3:44
3. "Easy Come Easy Go" - 3:29

== Charts ==
Chart (2003)	Peak position
Ireland (IRMA)	31
UK Singles (OCC)	3
UK Airplay (Music Week)	44

=== Year-end charts ===
Year-end chart performance for "We Just Be Dreamin'"
Chart (2003)	Position
UK Singles (OCC)	127
