= Now or Never (Blazin' Squad album) =

Studio album by Blazin' Squad
- Released: 20 November 2003 (UK)
- Recorded: 2003
- Genre: Hip hop
- Length: 51:58
- Labels: East West Records, Atlantic UK
- Producer: Adrian Bushby

Blazin' Squad chronology
In the Beginning (2002)	Now or Never (2003)	Greatest Hits (2009)

Singles from Now or Never
- 1. "We Just Be Dreamin'" Released: 23 June 2003; 2. "Flip Reverse" Released: 3 November 2003; 3. "Here 4 One" Released: 8 March 2004

Now or Never is the second studio album released by British ten-piece hip hop group Blazin' Squad. The album was released on 20 November 2003 in the United Kingdom, and peaked at #37 on the UK Albums Chart. The album spawned the singles "We Just Be Dreamin'", "Flip Reverse" and "Here 4 One". It features the rap version of "We Just Be Dreamin'", running at 3:28, instead of the vocal version, running at 3:37. The album cover was photographed in Queenborough, on the Isle of Sheppey. Following the album's commercial failure, the band split in 2004, and Now or Never became their last record to be released as a ten-piece band.

== Track listing ==
No.	Title	Writer(s)	Producer(s)	Length
1.	"Here 4 One"	Blazin' Squad, Andrew Murray, Christian Ballard, Jane Vaughan, Obi Mhondera	Oliver Smallman, Ballard, Murray	4:33
2.	"Biggest Fan"	Blazin' Squad, Vaughan, Mhondera, John Themis	Oliver Smallman, Themis	3:41
3.	"Flip Reverse"	Blazin' Squad, Murray, Ballard, Vaughan, Mhondera	Ballard, Denis Ingoldsby, Murray	2:55
4.	"Ride"	Blazin' Squad, Tapps Bandawe, Terry McLeod, Rene Campbell	The Xplosive Industry	3:12
5.	"Thinking About You"	Blazin' Squad, Murray, Ballard, Vaughan, Mhondera	Oliver Smallman, Ballard, Murray	3:57
6.	"No Angels"	Blazin' Squad, Joe Belmaati, Mich Hansen	Cutfather & Joe	4:10
7.	"Stop"	Blazin' Squad, Bandawe, McLeod, Nigel Bailey, Lionel Richie	The Xplosive Industry	3:56
8.	"Shorty"	Blazin' Squad, Vaughan, Mhondera, Themis	Ingoldsby, Themis	3:40
9.	"Revolution"	Marc Bolan, Blazin' Squad	Dirty Geezers, Adrian Bushby	2:53
10.	"Girls"	Blazin' Squad, Karl Daniel	JD	3:48
11.	"Baby It's the Weekend"	Blazin' Squad, Belmaati, Hansen, Andy Love, Jos Jørgensen	Cutfather & Joe	3:23
12.	"All We Wanna Do (Is Rap)"	Blazin' Squad	Blazin' Squad	3:16
13.	"We Just Be Dreamin'"	Blazin' Squad, Murray, Ballard, Ingoldsby, Josh Thompson	Ingoldsby, Ballard, Murray	3:28
14.	"Keep On"	Blazin' Squad, Bandawe, McLeod, Campbell	The Xplosive Industry	3:15
15.	"Life's a Struggle"	Blazin' Squad, N. C. Thanh, Ernest Newsky, Vick Krishna	Jiggy Joint	3:39

Sample credits

- "Stop" contains elements from "Easy" written and composed by Lionel Richie, as performed by The Commodores.
- "Revolution" contains elements from "Children of the Revolution written and composed by Marc Bolan, as performed by T. Rex.

B-sides

- "Made for Me" – 4:04
- "Easy Come, Easy Go" – 3:29
- "Anything" – 3:44
- "Nothing Like This" – 3:36
- "Who's It Gonna Be?" – 3:15
- "U Know What" – 5:01
- "Mic Check" – 4:03
- "Twisted Up" – 4:36

== Charts ==
Chart (2003)	Peak position
German Albums Chart	57
Scottish Albums Chart	47
UK Albums Chart	37

== Certifications ==
Region	Certification	Certified units/sales
United Kingdom (BPI)	Gold	100,000^{^}
^{^} Shipments figures based on certification alone.
