= Baby Goodbye (Friday Hill song) =

2005 single by Friday Hill

Single by Friday Hill

from the album Times Like These
- B-side: "Running Away" (demo)
- Released: 10 October 2005
- Length: 3:42
- Label: Longside
- Songwriters: James MacKenzie; James Murray; Mustafa Omer; Harry Wilkins; Si Hulbert; Simon Eyre
- Producer: Si Hulbert

Friday Hill singles chronology
"Here 4 One" (2004)	"Baby Goodbye" (2005)	"One More Night Alone" (2006)

"Baby Goodbye" is a song by pop trio Friday Hill, released as the lead single from their debut studio album, Times Like These (2006). Despite being released under the name Friday Hill, the song is included as part of Blazin' Squad's discography. Released in October 2005, it debuted and peaked at number five on the UK Singles Chart.

== Background ==
Following the split of ten-piece hip-hop group Blazin' Squad, band members Strider, Flava, and Kenzie were offered a record deal by Polydor records, to form as a trio and record an album together. The trio originally expressed the intention to continue performing as Blazin' Squad, however, due to licensing rights, the name was not available. As such, they decided to form under the name Friday Hill, which was created based around the trio's hometown of Chingford. The song is very much a departure from Blazin' Squad's style of music but was still successful commercially. Released on 10 October 2005, the single peaked at number five on the UK Singles Chart.

== Music video ==
The music video for "Baby Goodbye" premiered in September 2005, at a total length of three minutes and thirty-nine seconds. The video was filmed entirely in black and white, and features shots of the band in and around a country house, with images of a girl they are singing to intertwined. The band's performance in very casual costumes was criticised, however, the video was still given strong airplay.

== Track listings ==
- UK CD1
1. "Baby Goodbye" (main mix)
2. "Running Away" (demo)
- UK CD2
1. "Baby Goodbye" (main mix)
2. "Baby Goodbye" (main mix without rap)
3. "Baby Goodbye" (acappella)
4. "Baby Goodbye" (video)

== Personnel ==
Personnel are lifted from the UK CD1 liner notes.

- Kenzie – writing (as James MacKenzie)
- Flava – writing (as James Murray)
- Strider – writing (as Mustafa Omer)
- Harry Wilkins – writing
- Si Hulbert – writing, guitar, production, engineering
- Simon Eyre – writing, guitar

== Charts ==
=== Weekly charts ===
Chart (2005)	Peak position
Scottish Singles Sales (Official Charts)	4
UK Singles (Official Charts)	5

=== Year-end charts ===
Chart (2005)	Position
UK Singles (OCC)	122
