= Jason Nevins =

American songwriter and producer (born 1972)

- Born: December 15, 1972 (age 53); Los Angeles, California, U.S.
- Genres: Electronic; house; pop; hip-hop; big beat
- Occupations: Songwriter; record producer; remixer
- Years active: 1993–present
- Labels: Universal; Sony; Warner; DMG; Ultra; IDJMG; RCA; Columbia; Atlantic; Interscope; Jive; Mercury; Hollywood; Capitol; Epic
- Website: jasonnevins.com

Jason Nevins (born December 15, 1972) is an American songwriter, record producer and remixer, who is most widely known for his pop and dance productions, including his multi-platinum, multi-million selling production of "It's Like That" by American hip-hop group Run–D.M.C. and his multi-million selling production of "Cruise" by Florida Georgia Line featuring Nelly and his production of "Popular Song" by Mika and Ariana Grande.

== Career ==
In the 1990s, Nevins began releasing singles under various monikers through every big underground dance labels, but achieved global recognition in 1998 with his remix production of Run–D.M.C.'s "It's Like That", which was released under the title 'Run–DMC vs. Jason Nevins', reaching number-one on the pop chart in over 30 countries, with close to 5 million worldwide sales and over 1 million in sales in both Germany and the United Kingdom. As of 2025, the official video, which features Nevins, has over 100 million views on YouTube.

In the UK, the single also halted the Spice Girls' (then record) run of six consecutive number ones with their first six singles, holding the Spice Girls' seventh release, "Stop", at number 2. "It's Like That" was the third highest selling single of 1998 in the UK behind "Believe" by Cher and "My Heart Will Go On" by Celine Dion. Nevins is also on the coveted list of 'The UK's Official Best-Selling Songs Of All Time' for "Its Like That" as listed on the BBC Radio 1 Official charts website.

In 1998, Nevins won an RTL television number-one single award for the TV series Top of the Pops. The same year he also won a VIVA.

Nevins followed up "It's Like That" with a string of hip house remixes, with Run–D.M.C.'s "It's Tricky", 2 Live Crew's "We Want Some P&%$#!", Insane Clown Posse's "Hokus Pokus", Cypress Hill's "Insane in the Brain"; all featuring on his 1999 Sony album, Uni-Vs-Al (Universal). In 2001, he continued the "dance-rock sound" by adding big beat and rock influences to his remixes and productions, working on tracks for artists as varied as N.E.R.D, Duran Duran and the Bloodhound Gang. Nevins has also revisited producing his own work, with a release on the UK based Sanctuary Records, entitled The Funk Rocker, in October 2004, and reached top 5 airplay in Europe with his pseudonym, UKNY, with the track "I'm in Heaven", featuring vocals by Holly James. "Heaven" went to number 9 on the UK Singles Chart. Also taken from The Funk Rocker album, I'm the Main Man, which featured parts from T-Rex's Marc Bolan, landed a Coors Light Beer ad throughout the UK and Ireland. Coors launched the massive ad campaign using Nevins' track as the featured music for their commercial and campaign. In 2007, Nevins collaborated with Dannii Minogue on "Touch Me Like That", with a video being shot at the legendary Pinewood Studios in London.

Over the years, Nevins has had numerous songs, productions and remixes of his used in films, TV ads and video games. Jason has had 37 top 10 remixes and productions in the Billboard charts. In 2012, Nevins produced and co-wrote "I Believe in This Life" with Marius Moga (who has a song with Maroon 5) and Greg Holden (who wrote the hit song "Home" for Phillip Phillips)—a U.S. single for Jermaine Paul, the winner of the second season of the massively popular TV show The Voice on NBC. The song was used in a commercial for the Samsung Galaxy and their "Next Big Thing" campaign also featuring Blake Shelton.

In 2013, Nevins produced the Top 40 version for the American country group Florida Georgia Line's hit single "Cruise" featuring American singer/rapper Nelly. Nevins' idea of adding Nelly to the record also helped propel it to the top of the charts. The song peaked at number 2 on iTunes and at number 4 on the Billboard Hot 100 and has amassed 7.48 million in sales.

In 2013, Nevins, along with Florida Georgia Line and Nelly won the award for Song of the Year at the American Musics Award for the remix of "Cruise".

In 2013, Nevins produced the main version of Ariana Grande and Mika's "Popular Song", which was certified gold in the US by the RIAA (500,0000 copies). Nevins was hired by Rich Issacson, Mika's manager and Republic Records. The official YouTube video has reached 185 million views.

In 2014, Nevins, along with Florida Georgia Line and Nelly were nominated for Vocal Event of the Year at the 2014 Academy of Country Music Awards.

In 2015, Nevins again came up with the idea of creating a new song interpolating Twisted Sister's "We're Not Gonna Take It" with a new rap. Jason was working with rapper Jehry Robinson, and had him feature vocals. Robinson later signed to Tech N9Ne's Strange Music. The song has not yet been officially released, but the remix instrumental and hook was used for the television campaign for the Paramount feature film, The Spongebob Movie: Sponge Out Of Water.

On November 10, 2016, Nevins' remix of Nelly's "Work It" was played at the Golden State Warriors basketball game and became part of the viral video clip of Robin Schreiber dancing in the stands. The mega-viral video has achieved 130 million views.

As of April 2023, Florida Georgia Line & Nelly "Cruise" has been certified diamond and is the first country song to achieve that feat. The RIAA said the song has matched the success of others such as Lady Gaga's "Bad Romance" and Eminem's "Love the Way You Lie". Nielsen Music says the Nevins version including Nelly has sold 7.48 million tracks. The band's record label, Big Machine Records, says the song has been streamed more than 155 million times.

In December 2024, Nevins teamed up with María Becerra to release a new duet version of the holiday song "Jingle Bell Rock", featuring vocals from the original singer, Bobby Helms. The hit song was released via Warner Music Latina, Becerra's record label, headed up by Alejandro Duque. Similar to previous productions by Nevins, it was his idea for a duet merging the vocals of Helms with a fresh, new artist. The deal was put together by Nevins and Armando Lozando, Becerra's manager and founder of Big Bad Wolf Management. Even with a late release for the season, the official video had gained three million views in just a few weeks.

In January 2025, McDonalds in Australia launched a television advertisement called "Macca's Squad have arrived Down Under!", which featured "Its Like That".

== Discography ==
=== Albums (as artist) ===
- Red/Green CD (1993)
- Uni-Vs-Al (Universal) (2000)
- Pushing It Hard (2003)
- The Funk Rocker (2005)
- Pushing It Harder: The Lost Tapes (2006)

=== Charted Artist Singles ===
List of charted singles, with selected chart positions
Title	Year	Peak chart positions				Certifications
Title	Year	AUS	GER	NZ	UK	Certifications
"It's Like That" (vs. Run-D.M.C.)	1997	1	1	1	1	ARIA: 2× Platinum; BPI: 3× Platinum; BVMI: 3× Gold; RMNZ: Platinum
"We Want Some Pussy" (vs. the Krew)	1998	52	—	44	—	
"(It's) Tricky" (vs. Run-D.M.C.)	1998	15	23	5	74	
"Hold on Tight"	1998	—	—	—	93	
"Insane in the Brain" (vs. Cypress Hill)	1999	35	27	31	19	
"I'm in Heaven" (presents UKNY featuring Holly James)	2003	38	—	—	9	
"I'm the Main Man" (presents Funk Rocker)	2004	—	—	—	78	
"Touch Me Like That" (vs. Dannii Minogue)	2007	—	—	—	48	

=== Productions and songwriting highlights ===
- Run-DMC vs. Jason Nevins "It's Like That" (Smile/Profile/Sony) [Producer / Mixer]
- Florida Georgia Line featuring Nelly "Cruise" (Republic Nashville) [Producer of Nelly version/ Mixer]
- Mika featuring Ariana Grande – "Popular Song" (Universal Republic) [Producer/ Mixer]
- Amy Weber, Jason Nevins & Sean Kingston – "Dance of Life (Come Alive)" [Producer, Co-Writer and Mixer]
- Joel Crouse – "That's Why God Made Love Songs" (Showdog/ Universal) [Additional Production/ Arrangement]
- Jermaine Paul – "I Believe in This Life" (Universal Republic) [Producer and Co-Writer]
- Vicci Martinez – "I Can Love" (Universal Republic) [Producer, Co-writer and Mixer]
- Vicci Martinez – "Hold Me Darlin'" (Universal Republic) [Producer, Co-Writer and Mixer]
- Runner Runner – "Unstoppable" (Capitol/ Worldwide Pants) [Co-Writer]
- Myname – "We Made It" (Digz Japan) [Co-Writer]
- Duran Duran – "(Reach Up for the) Sunrise" – additional production on the album version [Additional Production /Mixer]
- Chemistry – "Yoake-Dawn" (Sony Music Japan) [Co-Writer]
- Jason Nevins featuring Greg Nice – "Candyman" (Ultra) [Producer, Co-writer and Mixer]
- Jason Nevins – "Open Ur Mind" (Ultra) [Producer, Co-Writer and Mixer]
- Jason Nevins vs. Dannii Minogue – "Touch Me Like That" (AATW) [Producer, Co-Writer and Mixer]
- Jason Nevins featuring Holly James – "I'm in Heaven" (Nevco) (Free2Air/Edel- deal ended) [Writer, Producer and Mixer]
- Jason Nevins vs. Liroy – "Scyzoryk" (BMG) [Producer and Mixer]

=== DJ mixed compilations ===
- Club Mix USA (Tycoon Records/Sony Music Canada, 2002)
- Virgin Records Dance Hits (Virgin Records, 2004)
- High School Musical 2: Non-Stop Dance Party (Disney Records, 2007) – remixed entire album and DJ mixed
- Dance Anthems 2 (Thrive Records, 2008)
- Ultra.Dance, Vol. 10 (Ultra Music, 2009)
- Ultra Weekend 5 (Ultra Music, 2009)
- Jersey Shore Soundtrack (Universal Republic, 2010)
