= Divine Inspiration (band) =

- Origin: Fochabers, Scotland
- Genres: Dance
- Years active: 2002–present
- Labels: ID&T Records, Heat Records
- Members: Sarah-Jane Scott; Paul Crawley; Davin Lewin
- Past members: Lee Robinson
- Website: myspace.com/divineinspiration3/

Divine Inspiration are a British music group that formed in 2002. The group consists of singer Sarah-Jane Scott, DJ Paul Crawley, David Lewin and Lee Robinson. They have had two singles that charted in the United Kingdom. Their first release, "The Way (Put Your Hand in My Hand)" peaked at number five in the UK Singles Chart in January 2003. "What Will Be, Will Be (Destiny)" only reached number 55. In 2005 they released a third single, "Someday", which failed to chart.

== Discography ==
- "The Way (Put Your Hand in My Hand)" (#5 UK, 2003)
- "What Will Be, Will Be (Destiny)" (#55 UK, 2003)
- "Someday" (2005)
