= Kira (Belgian singer) =

Belgian singer and model (born 1977)

- Born: Natasja de Witte; 3 May 1977 (age 49); Affligem, Belgium
- Occupations: Model, singer

Kira (born Natasja de Witte, 3 May 1977) is a Belgian singer and model.

== History ==
Kira was born in Affligem, where she has lived her whole life.

At the age of thirteen, Kira had her first brush with fame when she appeared on the Belgian TV show Stars in Their Eyes. In 2000, she competed in the Belgian version of Popstars and was voted in the top ten. That same year she was runner-up in the Miss Belgium beauty contest.

In March 2002, Kira was introduced to record producers Bart Grinaert and the brothers Bert and Maarten Wilmaers, who are known for producing the Viper records The Twister and Blue Sunshine and Montini Experience's My House is Your House, and remixed versions of songs such as Sash!'s "Mysterious Times" and Groovezone's "Eisbaer". The first result of this collaboration was Kira's debut single "I'll Be Your Angel", for which she was signed worldwide (except Benelux) to BMG's NuLife Recordings in May 2002. The single went to #15 in the Belgian chart and No. 9 on the UK Singles Chart, leading to her live performance of the song on BBC TV's Top of the Pops. It was also released in the United States, Spain and Australia.

== Discography ==
=== Singles ===
List of singles, with selected chart positions
Title	Year	Peak chart positions			
Title	Year	BEL (FL)	AUS	NLD	UK
"I'll Be Your Angel"	2003	15	69	59	9
"2 Hearts"	2003	44	—	—	—
"All My Life"	2003	—	—	—	—
