= Complete (Jaimeson song) =

2003 single by Jaimeson

Single by Jaimeson
- Released: 11 August 2003
- Length: 3:45
- Label: V2
- Songwriter: Jamie Williams
- Producer: Jaimeson

Jaimeson singles chronology
"True" (2003)	"Complete" (2003)	"Take Control" (2004)

"Complete" is a song by British electronic music producer Jaimeson. It was released as a single on 11 August 2003 in the United Kingdom. The single debuted at a peak position of number four on the UK Singles Chart and reached number 27 in the Netherlands.

== Track listings ==
UK CD and 12-inch single

1. "Complete" (radio edit) – 3:42
2. "Complete" (4x4 remix) – 5:42
3. "Complete" (Danny Fresh full 12-inch mix) – 5:58

European CD single

1. "Complete" (Phase 2 mix) – 3:43
2. "Complete" (radio edit) – 3:42

== Charts ==
=== Weekly charts ===
Chart (2003)	Peak position
Europe (Eurochart Hot 100)	17
Netherlands (Dutch Top 40)	27
Netherlands (Single Top 100)	66
Scottish Singles Sales (Official Charts)	17
UK Singles (Official Charts)	4
UK Dance (Official Charts)	7
UK Indie (Official Charts)	1

=== Year-end charts ===
Chart (2003)	Position
UK Singles (OCC)	113
