= Reminisce / Where the Story Ends =

Single by Blazin' Squad

from the album In the Beginning
- Released: 10 February 2003
- Recorded: 2003
- Genre: Pop, hip hop, R&B
- Label: East West Records
- Producer(s): TNT Xplosive, Huggy Bear, Cutfather & Joe

Blazin' Squad singles chronology
"Love on the Line" (2002)	"Reminisce / Where the Story Ends" (2003)	"We Just Be Dreamin'" (2003)

"Reminisce" / "Where The Story Ends" are two songs by ten piece hip-hop group Blazin' Squad, released as a double A-side single from their debut studio album, In the Beginning.

== Background ==
Although a double A-side released was not originally intended, after the band expressed interest in both songs as singles, the record label decide to pair them together as a double A-side, as they did not wish to release four singles from one album. Although "Reminisce" received more radio and video airplay, "Where the Story Ends" also became a significant part of the single release, and was regularly performed on TV in promotion of the single. "Reminisce" contains a sample from Zapp's 1985 hit-single "Computer Love". The sample is mainly featured in the intro of the song. The single was released on 10 February 2003. Although it was the least successful single from the album, it did manage to reach a peak position of #8 on the UK Singles Chart, meaning all three singles from the album peaked within the UK Top 10.

== Music videos ==
Music videos were made and released for both songs, although "Reminisce" generally received more airplay. Despite the radio version being the prominent mix, the music video for "Reminisce" contains the longer album version. The video lasts for a total length of four minutes and ten seconds. The video features the group performing the song atop the wreckage in a dis-used scrapyard. The video features individual shots of each band member, as well scenes featuring the whole band. The video was filmed in East London. The music video for "Where the Story Ends" was a much simpler production. The video lasts for a total length of four minutes and twenty-seven seconds. The video features footage of the band recording the song in the studio, as well as other clips from their TV appearances, meet and greets and other personal appearances.

== Track listing ==
- Digital single
1. "Reminisce" (Radio Edit) - 3:10
2. "Where The Story Ends" (Album Version) - 4:40
- UK CD #1
1. "Reminisce" (Radio Edit) - 3:10
2. "Where The Story Ends" (Album Version) - 4:40
3. "How Blazin' Rolls" - 3:41
4. "Reminisce" (CD-Rom Video) - 3:10
- UK CD #2
1. "Reminisce" (TNT Xplosive Platinum Mix) - 3:27
2. "Reminisce" (Album Version) - 4:03
3. "Where The Story Ends" (Video) - 4:27
4. "Band Video Interview" - 3:58
- Cassette
1. "Reminisce" (Radio Edit) - 3:10
2. "Where The Story Ends" (Album Version) - 4:40
3. "Reminisce" (TNT Xplosive Platinum Mix) - 3:27

== Charts ==
Chart (2003)	Peak position
Ireland (IRMA)	9
UK Singles (OCC)	8

=== Year-end charts ===
Year-end chart performance for "Reminisce / Where the Story Ends"
Chart (2003)	Position
UK Singles (OCC)	198
