= The Way (Put Your Hand in My Hand) =

2003 single by Divine Inspiration

- Maxi CD single cover

Single by Divine Inspiration
- Released: 6 January 2003
- Length: 2:59
- Label: Data, ID&T
- Songwriters: Lee Robinson, Dave Lewin, Paul Crawley, Sarah-Jane Scott
- Producers: Lee Robinson, Dave Lewin, Paul Crawley, Sarah-Jane Scott

Divine Inspiration singles chronology
"The Way (Put Your Hand in My Hand)" (2003)	"What Will Be, Will Be (Destiny)" (2003)

"The Way (Put Your Hand in My Hand)" is a single released by British music group Divine Inspiration on 6 January 2003. It reached number five on the UK Singles Chart and number 34 on the Irish Singles Chart in January 2003. It also found minor success in Germany and the Netherlands.

== Music video ==
The music video was filmed in Brighton and Hove, particularly around Brighton Pier.

== Charts ==
=== Weekly charts ===
Chart (2003)	Peak position
Australian Club Chart (ARIA)	5
Australian Dance (ARIA)	23
Europe (Eurochart Hot 100)	22
Germany (GfK)	83
Ireland (IRMA)	34
Ireland Dance (IRMA)	2
Netherlands (Single Top 100)	81
Scotland Singles (Official Charts)	3
UK Singles (Official Charts)	5
UK Dance (Official Charts)	2

=== Year-end charts ===
Chart (2003)	Position
Australian Club Chart (ARIA)	43
UK Singles (OCC)	128
