= Let's Push Things Forward =

Single by The Streets

from the album Original Pirate Material
- Released: 15 April 2002
- Recorded: 2001
- Genre: Alternative hip hop; ska
- Length: 3:53
- Label: Locked On
- Songwriter(s): Mike Skinner
- Producer(s): Mike Skinner

The Streets singles chronology
"Has It Come to This?" (2001)	"Let's Push Things Forward" (2002)	"Weak Become Heroes" (2002)

Alternative cover
- UK CD 2

"Let's Push Things Forward" is a song by English rapper and producer Mike Skinner under the music project the Streets. It was released in April 2002 as the second single from their debut studio album, Original Pirate Material. It peaked at number 30 on the UK chart. The song is performed by Mike Skinner and Kevin Mark Trail.

== Critical reception ==
"'Let's Push Things Forward' grew on me…" remarked Pink Floyd's David Gilmour. "It's forward-looking and anarchic. It has its own anti-big-company ethos, which I like. And it has strange little quirks of timing that I find very hard to use. Perhaps it will influence me in the future. I don't know. But it's nice to hear something that works which is outside your usual frame of reference."

== Music video ==
The music video was directed by the Snorri Brothers and premiered in April 2002. It was filmed in South London with the first shot looking south in Deptford Church Street, London

== Track listing ==
=== CD 1 ===
1. "Let's Push Things Forward" (Album Version)
2. "Let's Push Things Forward" (Studio Gangsters Mix)
3. "Let's Push Things Forward" (Zed Bias Dub Mix)

=== CD 2 ===
1. "Let's Push Things Forward" (Album Version)
2. "All Got Our Runnins"
3. "Don't Mug Yourself" (Instrumental)

== Charts ==
Chart (2002)	Peak position
Netherlands (Single Top 100)	98
Scotland (OCC)	40
UK Singles (OCC)	30
UK Dance (OCC)	3
