= Praful =

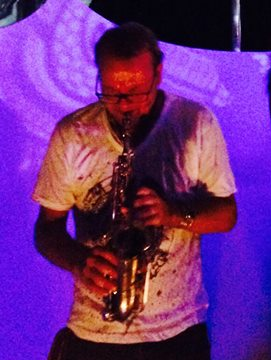
- Praful during a show of Red Fulka, Ibiza 2014

Background information
- Born: Ulrich Schröder; 1 January 1964 (age 62); Düsseldorf, Germany
- Origin: Amsterdam, Netherlands
- Genres: Jazz, acid jazz, smooth jazz
- Years active: 1987 – present
- Labels: Therapy Records, Mystic Productions, Hitech Roots, SHiNiNG MUSiC iBiZA
- Website: www.prafulmusic.com

Ulrich Schröder (born 1 January 1964), known under the pseudonym Praful (/prəˈfʊl/ prə-FUUL), is an acid jazz artist who performs on several instruments including tenor and soprano saxophones, Indian bamboo flutes, pandeiros, Fender Rhodes and many electronic effects. Two of his CDs One Day Deep and Pyramid in Your Backyard have won many awards and worldwide recognition. "Sigh", included in the One Day Deep CD and as a single, had stayed in the Billboards for over 70 weeks.

Praful's songs show a wide variety of rhythm and roots. On One Day Deep, "Sonhar" features a fast Indian dance rhythm. On the same CD, "Let the Chips Fall" reveals a relaxing acid jazz rhythm. He lives near Amsterdam, the Netherlands.

== Biography ==
=== Early life ===
As a young child he learned the recorder, flute and electronic organ. Frustrated when his mother would not let him carry the electronic organ with him to gigs around town he vowed never to play the instrument again, instead switching to piano and synthesizers. He switched to the saxophone at age 18. His first bands were

- AKO High School BigBand
- Main Squeeze BigBand ( trumpet player Till Broenner)
- Circle Five

After school he traveled the world for a year, returning with a broadened horizon and the determination to make music the center of his life and creative expression.

=== Education & Travels ===
In 1987 he moved to the Netherlands to study jazz saxophone and flute at the Amsterdam School of Arts (Hilversum Conservatory, now AHK). There he was taught by Ferdinand Povel, Friederike Darius and Rob Madna.

During his time as a student at the conservatory Praful was involved in several bands including:

- Good Move
- Praful & Alchemy
- and Coco, his first experiment with Jazz Fusion and Latin Music

After receiving his Conservatory degree in 1992 he spent 6 months in India in the Ashram of the enlightened teacher Osho, meditating and learning the Indian Bansuri. It was during this time that he took the spiritual name 'Praful' which he describes as symbolic of 'a new beginning' and meaning "blossoming".

== Career ==
Following his travels to India, Praful spent 10 months in Brazil where his musical style took on heavy influences of Samba. Upon returning to Amsterdam in 1993, he worked mainly with Brazilian and Latin groups and artists including:

- Treme Terra
- Nippy Noya
- Saoco
- Armando Peraza
- Gerardo Rosales

From 1997 on he was drawn to electronica and newer developments in music like trip hop, dance and drum and bass.

In 1999 Praful joined the experimental dance formation Project 2000, a drum and bass group which experience regional success in the Netherlands. That year Project 2000 won the prestigious Dutch Heineken Cross Over Music Award. 1999 also saw the release of the Project 2000 album 'It's about time' and 2 singles with Universal/Polydor.

From 1997 until 2002 he worked as reed player and composer with 'Bayuba Cante', an international group mixing Afro-Cuban Santería-roots with flamenco, rumba, Indian music, funk and jazz, with 2 albums released (Network-DE) and tours in Europe, Cuba and Canada.

In 1999 he released his first solo album, the meditative 'Touched by Love'. In that year he also started following lessons in Bansuri (Indian bamboo flute) with Indian Pandit Hariprasad Chaurasia, who continues to be his teacher and great inspiration.

In 2001 Praful signed a deal with Dutch Indie label Therapy Records, for which he released 3 albums and several singles and vinyls until 2007. The international success of 'One Day Deep' made Praful a household name for Chill-, Jazz-, Dance- and Crossover-Fans. The album was produced and recorded by Praful with the producers duo Adani&Wolf, with guests Afra Mussawisade (percussion, Iran/Germany), Ted de Jong (tabla, Netherlands), Adrian Elissen (Spanish guitar, Malta), Jose Lopretti (bass, Uruguay) and Brazilian singer Lilian Vieira (Brazil/Zuco 103).

=== Musical Styles and Influences ===
Praful was influenced by pop music from a young age. Early saxophone influences included Jazz artists like Michael Brecker, Bob Berg and Wayne Shorter. During his studies at conservatory Praful began to be affected by the musical styles of John Coltrane and Charlie Parker.

He is influenced by many other non-saxophone instrumentalists. He lists Pat Metheny as one of his strongest influences saying "...he always tried to play guitar [as if] he was a reed player." Metheny's earlier works exhibited a blend of new-age music, fusion and Brazilian which would also be exhibited in Praful's own music.

Primarily a jazz musician, Praful has recorded music from many different genres including pop music, urban, smooth jazz, new age, Afro-Cuban jazz, Latin music, Santería, flamenco, rumba, Indian music, funk, bossa nova, acid jazz.

== Discography ==
=== Project 2000 ===
Year	Album details
1999	It's about time: Released: 1999; Label: Universal/Polydor; Awards: Dutch Heineken Cross Over Music Award

=== Solo ===
Year	Album details
1999	Touched by Love: Released: 1999; Label: Mystic Production; Format: album
1999	Touched by Love: Released: 1999; Label: Mystic Production; Format: album
1999	Touched by Love: Label: Mystic Production 1999; Distribution: Netherlands; Format: album
2001	One Day Deep: Format: album; Label: Therapy Records 2001
2002	Inspiracao: Format: single; Label: Therapy Records 2002
2002	Naked / Corpo Suado: Format: 12 inch; Label: Therapy Records 2002; Tracks: Naked + Corpo Suado remixes by Adani&Wolf, Sinus Function (edit)
2002	Inspircao: Format: 12 inch; Label: Therapy Records 2002; Tracks: : Inspircao (Hardsoul Treatment), Sigh, Let The Chips Fall
2002	Corpo Suado: Format: 12 inch; Label: Therapy Records 2002; Tracks: Corpo Suado (original), Underworld (extended)
2003	One Day Deep: Format: album; Label: Blue Flame Records 2003; Distribution: Germany, Austria, Switzerland
2003	One Day Deep: Format: album; Label: Rendezvous Entertainment 2003; Distribution: USA, Canada
2003	Sigh: Format: 12 inch; Label: Rendezvous Entertainment 2003; Distribution: USA
2004	Inspiracao: Format: 12inch; Label: Elan Rouge Records 2004; Distribution: UK; Tracks: remixes by (Ian Carey remix, Hardsoul Treatment, album version),
2004	Let The Chips Fall: Format: CD-single; Label: Rendezvous Entertainment 2004; Distribution: USA
2005	Pyramid In Your Backyard: Format: album; Label: Therapy Records 2005; Distribution: Benelux
2005	Pyramid In Your Backyard: Format: album; Label: Rendezvous Entertainment 2005; Distribution: USA, Canada
2006	Underworld - Ant. Ocasio Remix, Original: Format: 12 inch; Label: Tribal Winds Records 2006; Distribution: USA
2007	Remixed+2: Format: album; Label: Therapy Records/Rendezvous Entertainment 01/2007; Distribution: Europe, USA
2008	Where Spirits Live: Format: album; Label: Mystic Production 07/2008; Distribution: World
2011	Pure: Format: album; Label: Mystic Production 07/2011; Distribution: World
2013	Mirror Of The Heart: Format: album; Label: Mystic Production 07/2013; Distribution: World
2014	Into Being: Format: album; Label: Mystic Production 10/2014; Distribution: World

=== Collaboration albums ===
Year	Album details
2015	Quintessence: Format: Album; Artist/ Project: Praful & Sika; Label: Mystic Productions; Distribution: Worldwide
2014	The Silent Side of Satie: Format: Album; Artist/ Project: Praful & Helvia Briggen; Label: Mystic Productions; Distribution: Worldwide
2010	The Latin Touch: Format: CD; Artist/ Project: Laura Fygi; Label: Universal Music (The Netherlands), 2004; Distribution: Worldwide
2010	Here I Am, Beloved: Format: Maxi-Single; Artist/ Project: Peruquois & Praful; Label: Mystic Production & Peruquois 2010; Distribution: Worldwide
2009	Breathing Love: Format: album; Artist/ Project: Peruquois & Praful; Label: Mystic Production & Peruquois 07/2009; Distribution: Worldwide

=== Red Fulka ===
Year	Album details
2015	Soul On Fire: Format: EP; Project: Red Fulka; Label: SHiNiNG MUSiC iBiZA 02/2015; Distribution: Worldwide
2011	We Are One: Format: album; Project: Red Fulka; Label: Mystic Production; Distribution: Worldwide

== Awards and nominations ==
- Dutch Heineken Crossover Award - with Project 2000 (1999)
- Discovery Artist of the Year - LA Radio Station The Wave (2003)

== Notes & References ==
References:
