= Has It Come to This? =

2001 single by The Streets

Single by The Streets

from the album Original Pirate Material
- Released: 8 October 2001
- Recorded: 2001
- Genre: UK garage; British hip hop
- Length: 3:53
- Label: Locked On/679
- Songwriter(s): Mike Skinner
- Producer(s): Mike Skinner

The Streets singles chronology
"Has It Come to This?" (2001)	"Let's Push Things Forward" (2002)

"Has It Come to This?" is a song by English rapper and producer Mike Skinner under the music project the Streets. It was released in October 2001 as the lead single from their debut album Original Pirate Material. The song spent a total of five weeks on the UK Singles Chart, peaking at #18 and was certified Gold by the British Phonographic Industry in June 2024.

== Content ==
The song is noted for its grounded lyrical focus, depicting real life in British working-class contexts such as “sex, drugs, the dole, music and admittedly PlayStations.” Its production blends UK garage elements — a garage beat, 2-step rhythms, bass-heavy wobble — with a laid-back, reflective tone described as “cannabis calm.”

Journalists have characterized the track as an “elegy to delinquency,” highlighting its unglossy realism in contrast with more aspirational or glamorous lyrics common in garage music.

Mike Skinner has said that when he broke through with “Has It Come to This?”, his selling point was not "glitz, or ghetto, but geezer".

== Critical reception ==
Upon release, it was reviewed by NME as "the most original, lyrical British rap in memory", charting "an evolutionary route for UK garage". Leonie Cooper of NME called the pirate radio call to arms of 'Lock down your aerial' "iconic".

The Independent described the song as “a startlingly original debut single” that introduced Skinner’s conversational delivery and detailed observations of everyday British life.

Mixmag included the song in their list of "40 of the best UK garage tracks released from 1995 to 2005".

In November 2016, UK duo Gorgon City compiled a list of their top UK garage songs for Billboard, with "Has It Come to This" at #15.

In September 2019, NME included the song in their "25 essential UK garage anthems" list.

Gemtracks included the song in their list of the "top UK garage songs between 1995–2005".

== Legacy ==
In 2025, the track was sampled by American rapper Aminé on his song Arc de Triomphe.

== Track listing ==
1. "Has It Come to This?" (Original Mix)
2. "Has It Come to This?" (Zed Bias Vocal Mix)
3. "Has It Come to This?" (Jaimeson Mix)
4. "Streets Score"

== Charts ==
Chart (2001)	Peak position
Scotland (OCC)	45
UK Singles (OCC)	18

== Certifications ==
Region	Certification	Certified units/sales
United Kingdom (BPI)	Gold	400,000^{‡}
^{‡} Sales+streaming figures based on certification alone.
