= Jaimeson =

British musician

Jaimeson (né Jamie Williams) is a British garage producer and MC, best known for his hit singles in 2003 and 2004. He has also produced drum and bass and house music.

Jaimeson emerged in the underground music scene in the 1990s, breaking through in January 2003 with the release of "True", featuring the vocals of Angel Blu and a rap verse by Jaimeson, which peaked at number four on the UK Singles Chart. This was then followed up by "Complete" featuring singer Xara which also peaked at number four on the chart in August 2003 and "Take Control", which peaked at number sixteen in February 2004.

Jaimeson ran his own record label, in addition to dealing with his own promotion. He has remixed many tracks since 2001 such as the Streets' "Has It Come to This", Jay-Z's "Izzo", Maxwell D's "Serious", Sugababes' "Freak like Me", Big Brovaz' "Baby Boy", Billy Crawford's "You Didn't Expect That", Harry Wilkins' "Sex Go Round", 3rd Edge's "In and Out" and Destiny's Child's number one hit, "Survivor".

In 2004, Jaimeson featured in the BBC Three TV documentary series Tower Block Dreams, in the episode titled "Grimetime to Primetime".

== Discography ==
=== Albums ===
- Think on Your Feet (2004) UK #42
- Think on the Street (2004)
- Jaimeson Revisited (2007)

=== Singles ===
- "True" (2003) - UK #4
- "Complete" (2003) - UK #4, NL #27
- "Take Control" (2004) - UK #16, FI #20
