= Blazin' Squad =

English hip hop group

- Origin: Highams Park, London, England
- Genre: Hip hop
- Years active: 2002–2004; 2006; 2009
- Labels: East West; Polydor; Naughty Boy
- Spinoffs: Friday Hill
- Past members: Kenzie; Rocky B; Freek; Melo-D; Spike-E; Reepa; Krazy; Flava; Tommy-B; Strider

Blazin' Squad were an English hip hop group. The group had six top ten hits on the UK Singles Chart, including "Crossroads", a cover version of the Bone Thugs-n-Harmony original.

== Career ==
=== In The Beginning: 2002 ===
The band released a number of white label singles on the Weighty Plates label featuring remixes of the track "Standard Flow" from their album In the Beginning. "Standard Flow" was remixed by Ras Kwarme and Origin Unknown, with a version available featuring Jamaican dancehall musician Elephant Man on guest vocals. Even though the releases were issued as underground white labels, "Standard Flow" sold enough copies to chart as Blazin' Squad's first Top 100 chart entry, peaking at number 78 on the chart of 17 August 2002 with three weeks in the countdown.

For their official debut, the band released a cover of the Bone Thugs-N-Harmony song "Crossroads" for Warner Music's East West Records label. This single was the first to reach the UK Top 40, and debuted in the number one spot on the UK Singles Chart of 31 August 2002. The song was highly re-recorded and hardly contained any lyrics of the original. The single was heavily criticised by the media, some of whom claimed their rap skills were 'not to be taken seriously', and others sidelining them to a younger audience. Despite this, however, their debut album, In the Beginning achieved gold status in the UK and spawned two further top ten hits, "Love on the Line" and double A-side single, "Reminisce/Where the Story Ends". The album was released to general critical censure. Jon O'Brien of AllMusic called them the "self-proclaimed pioneers of 'chav' culture".

=== Now or Never: 2003–2004 ===
The group went on to achieve further chart success in 2003, with two further top five chart hits. "We Just Be Dreamin'" reached number three in July 2003, and "Flip Reverse", which was co-written by former member Liam D'Souza reached number two in November. "Flip Reverse" was subsequently used to re-launch Top of the Pops, with a special performance recorded outside the BBC Television Centre with 100 or so hooded back-up dancers. Despite the chart success of their singles, the group failed to match their success with their second album, Now or Never, only peaking at #36 on the UK Albums Chart. A live recording of a concert in Liverpool was released on DVD for Christmas 2003 but failed to achieve any commercial success. It also failed to re-ignite the low sales of the album. "Here 4 One" was issued as the third single from Now or Never in early 2004, peaking at #6 on the UK Singles Chart, but sales failed to be strong enough to warrant a third album deal.

=== Friday Hill and Times Like These: 2005–2006 ===
In 2005, Strider, Flava and Kenzie signed a record deal with Polydor records, and began recording an album under the name Friday Hill, named after a location in their hometown in Chingford. In October 2005, the group released their debut single, "Baby Goodbye", which reached #5 in the UK Singles Chart, selling over 80,000 copies. In February 2006, they released a second single, "One More Night Alone", which reached #13 on the UK Singles Chart. Their album, entitled Times Like These, was also released in February 2006, but only peaked at #67 on the UK Albums Chart, leading them to be dropped from their label.

In July 2006, Rocky-B, Reepa, Spike-E and Melo-D made an announcement that they were going to reform as Blazin' Squad, and record and release a new album under Peach Records. They released a single, "All Night Long", in August 2006, however, it only peaked at #54, which resulted in their record deal being scrapped and their disbandment.

=== Greatest Hits: 2009 ===
In June 2009, Strider, Flava, Kenzie, Krazy and Rocky B announced they would be re-uniting as a five-piece, and subsequently released their comeback single, "Let's Start Again". The single fared slightly better than the previous single but could only peak at #51 on the UK Singles Chart. Despite their record label wanting to drop them following the lack of success of the single, they had signed a binding contract to release an album. The label issued a Greatest Hits compilation via digital download and thereby ended the contract with the group.

== Members ==
- James MacKenzie AKA "Kenzie" (2002–2004, 2005–2006, 2009)
- Ollie Georgiou AKA "Freek" (2002–2004)
- Marcel Somerville AKA "Rocky B" (2002–2004, 2006, 2009)
- Chris McKeckney AKA "Melo-D" (2002–2004, 2006)
- Stuart Baker AKA "Reepa" (2002–2004, 2006)
- Lee Bailey AKA "Krazy" (2002–2004, 2009)
- Sam Foulkes AKA "Spike-E" (2002–2004, 2006)
- James Murray AKA "Flava" (2002–2004, 2005–2006, 2009)
- Tom Beasley AKA "Tommy-B" (2002–2004)
- Mustafa Omer AKA "Strider" (2002–2004, 2005–2006, 2009)

== Discography ==
=== Albums ===
| Title | Details | Peak chart positions | | Certifications (sales threshold) |
| Title | Details | UK | GER | Certifications (sales threshold) |
|---|---|---|---|---|
| In the Beginning | Release date: 25 November 2002; Label: East West Records; Formats: CD, cassette | 33 | — | UK: Gold |
| Now or Never | Release date: 20 November 2003; Label: East West Records; Formats: CD, cassette | 37 | 57 | UK: Gold |
| Greatest Hits | Release date: 22 June 2009; Label: Naughty Boy Records; Formats: Digital Download | – | – | |
"—" denotes releases that did not chart

=== Singles ===
| Year | Single | Peak chart positions | | | Album |
| Year | Single | UK | GER | IRE | Album |
|---|---|---|---|---|---|
| 2002 | "Standard Flow" | 78 | — | — | In the Beginning |
| 2002 | "Crossroads" | 1 | 82 | 13 | In the Beginning |
| 2002 | "Love on the Line" | 6 | — | 28 | In the Beginning |
| 2003 | "Reminisce / Where the Story Ends" | 8 | — | 28 | In the Beginning |
| 2003 | "We Just Be Dreamin'" | 3 | 75 | 31 | Now or Never |
| 2003 | "Flip Reverse" | 2 | 22 | 15 | Now or Never |
| 2004 | "Here 4 One" | 6 | — | 18 | Now or Never |
| 2006 | "All Night Long" | 54 | — | — | Greatest Hits |
| 2009 | "Let's Start Again" | 51 | — | — | Greatest Hits |
"—" denotes releases that did not chart

=== Blazin' Squad - Weighty Plates Singles ===
- Weighty Plates Volume 1: Standard Flow Remixes (Number 78 in the UK Top 100, 2002)
- Weighty Plates Volume 2: Standard Flow Ras Kwame Mixes (with Ras Kwame and Elephant Man)
- Weighty Plates Volume 3: Standard Flow: Origin Unknown & DND Remixes

== Friday Hill Discography ==
=== Album ===
| Title | Details | Peak chart positions | | Certifications (sales threshold) |
| Title | Details | UK | GER | Certifications (sales threshold) |
|---|---|---|---|---|
| Times Like These | Release date: 27 February 2006; Label: Polydor Records; Formats: CD, Digital download | 67 | – | |
"—" denotes releases that did not chart

=== Singles ===
| Year | Single | Peak chart positions | | | Album |
| Year | Single | UK | GER | IRE | Album |
|---|---|---|---|---|---|
| 2005 | "Baby Goodbye" | 5 | — | — | Times Like These |
| 2006 | "One More Night Alone" | 13 | — | — | Times Like These |
