= Angel Blu =

British singer

Angel Blu is a female dance music vocalist who was featured on the 2003 hit "True" by Jaimeson, which peaked at No. 4 on the UK Singles Chart in January 2003. Her next single with Jaimeson, "Take Control", which features CK, charted at No. 16 in February 2004, and was featured on a number of dance compilation albums. It also peaked at No. 20 on the Finnish singles chart.

== Discography ==
=== Singles ===
- "True" (2003) - UK #4 (Jaimeson featuring Angel Blu)
- "Take Control" (2004) - UK #16, FI #20 (Jaimeson featuring Angel Blu and CK)
