= True (Jaimeson song) =

2003 single by Jaimeson

Single by Jaimeson featuring Angel Blu
- Released: 13 January 2003
- Length: 4:58 (album version); 3:35 (radio edit)
- Label: Virgin
- Songwriter(s): Hawa Mariama Fatmata Khan, Debbie Lorreene Mckoy, Jamie Williams
- Producer(s): Jaimeson

Jaimeson singles chronology
"True" (2003)	"Complete" (2003)

"True" is the debut single by English producer/rapper Jaimeson, released in January 2003. The song features Angel Blu as vocalist, with Jaimeson providing the rapping. The single peaked at number four on the UK Singles Chart.

== Charts ==
=== Weekly charts ===
Chart (2003)	Peak position
Europe (Eurochart Hot 100)	15
Scotland (OCC)	32
UK Singles (OCC)	4
UK Dance (OCC)	3
UK Indie (OCC)	1

=== Year-end charts ===
Chart (2003)	Position
UK Singles (OCC)	82
