= List of UK Compilation Chart number ones of the 2000s =

This is the list of the number-one albums of the UK Compilation Chart during the 2000s.

== Number-one albums ==
Key
†	Best-selling compilation album of the year

Artist (Note: The artist, album, date of reaching number one and number of weeks at number one are those given by the Official Charts Company.)	Album	Record label	Reached number one (for the week ending)	Weeks at number one
2000
Various artists	Now That's What I Call Music! 44	EMI/Virgin/Universal	4 December 1999	8
Various artists	Clubber's Guide to... 2000	Ministry of Sound	29 January 2000	2
Various artists	Ayia Napa: Fantasy Island	Telstar TV	12 February 2000	1
Various artists	The Love Songs Album	Warner/UMTV/Global	19 February 2000	1
Various artists	Rewind: The Sound of UK Garage	Ministry of Sound	26 February 2000	1
Original soundtrack	The Beach	London	4 March 2000	3
Various artists	New Hits 2000	Warner/UMTV/Sony TV	25 March 2000	2
Various artists	New Woman 2000	Virgin/EMI	8 April 2000	1
Various artists	Dance Nation: Tall Paul/Brandon Block	Ministry of Sound	15 April 2000	1
Various artists	Girls 2K	Virgin/EMI	22 April 2000	1
Various artists	Now That's What I Call Music! 45	EMI/Virgin/Universal	29 April 2000	6
Various artists	Clubber's Guide to Ibiza: Summer 2000	Ministry of Sound	10 June 2000	1
Various artists	Top of the Pops 2000: Vol 2	Universal Music TV	17 June 2000	1
Various artists	Club Mix Ibiza 2000	Universal Music TV	17 June 2000	3
Various artists	Fresh Hits: Vol 1	Warner/Global/Sony TV	15 July 2000	2
Various artists	Kiss Clublife Summer 2000	Universal Music TV	29 July 2000	1
Various artists	Now That's What I Call Music! 46	EMI/Virgin/Universal	5 August 2000	4
Various artists	The Ibiza Annual: Summer 2000	Ministry of Sound	2 September 2000	3
Various artists	Kiss Ibiza 2000	Universal Music TV	23 September 2000	2
Various artists	Trance Nation 4	Ministry of Sound	7 October 2000	3
Various artists	Clubmix 2000: Vol 2	Universal Music TV	28 October 2000	1
Various artists	Now Dance 2001	Virgin/EMI	4 November 2000	1
Various artists	The Annual 2000: Judge Jules/Tall Paul	Ministry of Sound	11 November 2000	2
Various artists	Cream Anthems 2001	Virgin/EMI	25 November 2000	1
Various artists	Now That's What I Call Music! 47	EMI/Virgin/Universal	2 December 2000	7
2001
Various artists	Clubbers Guide to 2001	Ministry of Sound	20 January 2001	2
Various artists	Breakdown: Very Best of Euphoric Dance	BMG/Telstar TV	3 February 2001	2
Various artists	The Chillout Session	Ministry of Sound	17 February 2001	6
Various artists	New Woman 2001	Virgin/EMI	31 March 2001	1
Various artists	The Annual: Spring 2001	Ministry of Sound	7 April 2001	2
Various artists	Now That's What I Call Music! 48	EMI/Virgin/Universal	21 April 2001	3
Original soundtrack	Bridget Jones's Diary	Mercury	12 May 2001	6
Various artists	Capital Gold Legends	Virgin/EMI	23 June 2001	7
Various artists	Now That's What I Call Music! 49	EMI/Virgin/Universal	11 August 2001	6
Various artists	The Classic Chillout Album	Columbia	22 September 2001	1
Various artists	Hits 50	BMG/Sony/Telstar/WSM	29 September 2001	2
Various artists	The Classic Chillout Album	Columbia	13 October 2001	1
Various artists	Pepsi Chart 2002	Virgin/EMI	20 October 2001	2
Various artists	Now Dance 2002	Virgin/EMI	3 November 2001	2
Various artists	The Annual 2002	Ministry of Sound	17 November 2001	2
Various artists	Now That's What I Call Music! 50 †	EMI/Virgin/UMTV	1 December 2001	7
2002
Various artists	Clubbers Guide to 2002	Ministry of Sound	19 January 2002	3
Various artists	Best Club Anthems 2002	EMI Virgin	9 February 2002	1
Various artists	Club Mix 2002	UMTV	16 February 2002	1
Various artists	Love So Strong	WSM	23 February 2002	1
Various artists	School Disco.com: Spring Term	Columbia	2 March 2002	2
Various artists	New Woman 2002	EMI Virgin	16 March 2002	1
Various artists	Supercharged	UMTV/WSM	23 March 2002	2
Various artists	Now That's What I Call Music! 51	EMI Virgin/UMTV	6 April 2002	2
Various artists	Pop Idol: The Big Band Album	S	20 April 2002	4
Various artists	Now That's What I Call Music! 51	EMI Virgin/UMTV	18 May 2002	1
Various artists	Kisstory	UMTV	25 May 2002	1
Various artists	The Best Summer Album 2002	UMTV	1 June 2002	1
Various artists	Clubbers Guide to Ibiza 2002	Ministry of Sound	8 June 2002	1
Various artists	Smash Hits Summer 2002	Virgin Music/EMI	15 June 2002	1
Various artists	Capital Gold Rock Legends	Virgin Music/EMI	22 June 2002	1
Various artists	The Very Best of MTV Unplugged	WSM/UMTV	29 June 2002	1
Various artists	Clubland	UMTV/Serious	6 July 2002	4
Various artists	Now That's What I Call Music! 52	EMI Virgin/UMTV	3 August 2002	5
Various artists	The Very Best of Pure R&B: The Summer	Telstar/BMG	7 September 2002	1
Various artists	Smash Hits: Let's Party	EMI Virgin/UMTV	14 September 2002	5
Various artists	New Woman: The Autumn Collection	EMI Virgin	19 October 2002	1
Various artists	Hits 54	BMG/Sony/Telstar/WSM	2 November 2002	2
Various artists	The Annual 2003	Ministry of Sound	16 November 2002	1
Various artists	Clubland II	UMTV/AATW	23 November 2002	1
Various artists	Now That's What I Call Music! 53 †	EMI Virgin/UMTV	30 November 2002	7
2003
Various artists	Clubbers Guide 2003	Ministry of Sound	18 January 2003	1
Various artists	8 Mile: Music from and Inspired by the Motion Picture	Interscope/Polydor	25 January 2003	3
Various artists	Love: Eternal Lovesongs	UMTV	15 February 2003	2
Various artists	Club Mix 2003	UMTV	1 March 2003	1
Various artists	The Very Best of MTV Unplugged 2	WSM/UMTV	8 March 2003	2
Various artists	The Very Best of Cold Feet	UMTV	22 March 2003	3
Various artists	Hits 55	UMTV	12 April 2003	2
Various artists	Now That's What I Call Music! 54	EMI Virgin/UMTV	26 April 2003	7
Various artists	Power Ballads	EMI Virgin	14 June 2003	3
Various artists	Clubland III	UMTV/AATW	5 July 2003	3
Various artists	Hits 56	BMG TV/Sony/Telstar/WSM	26 July 2003	1
Various artists	Now That's What I Call Music! 55	EMI Virgin/UMTV	2 August 2003	5
Various artists	Kiss Presents R&B Collaborations	Sony TV/UMTV	6 September 2003	3
Various artists	Clubmix Summer 2003	UMTV/AATW	27 September 2003	2
Various artists	Now Decades	EMI Virgin/UMTV	11 October 2003	3
Various artists	Greasemania	Polydor/S	1 November 2003	1
Various artists	Now Dance 2004	EMI Virgin/UMTV	8 November 2003	1
Various artists	Westwood: Platinum Edition	Def Jam/UMTV	15 November 2003	1
Various artists	Clubland 4	UMTV/AATW	22 November 2003	1
Various artists	Now That's What I Call Music! 56 †	EMI Virgin/UMTV	29 November 2003	7
2004
Various artists	Clubbers Guide: 2004	Ministry of Sound	17 January 2004	3
Various artists	Kiss Smooth R&B	Sony TV/UMTV	7 February 2004	1
Various artists	Clubmix 2004	AATW/UMTV	14 February 2004	1
Various artists	Beautiful	BMG TV	21 February 2004	1
Various artists	The Brit Awards Album 2004	BMG	28 February 2004	1
Various artists	Clubmix 2004	AATW/UMTV	6 March 2004	1
Various artists	Hit 40 UK	BMG/Sony/Telstar/WSM	13 March 2004	1
Various artists	Floorfillers	AATW/UMTV	20 March 2004	1
Various artists	The Very Best of New Woman	EMI Virgin	27 March 2004	1
Original soundtrack	Ultimate Dirty Dancing	RCA	3 April 2004	2
Various artists	Now That's What I Call Music! 57	EMI Virgin/UMTV	17 April 2004	8
Various artists	Hits 58	BMG/Sony/WSM	12 June 2004	1
Various artists	Power Ballads II	EMI Virgin	19 June 2004	3
Various artists	Essential R&B: The Very Best of R&B	BMG TV	10 July 2004	2
Various artists	Clubland 5	AATW/UMTV	24 July 2004	2
Various artists	Now That's What I Call Music! 58	EMI Virgin/UMTV	7 August 2004	7
Various artists	Sad Songs	EMI Virgin	25 September 2004	1
Various artists	Big Tunes: Living for the Weekend	Ministry of Sound	2 October 2004	1
Various artists	Now Years	EMI Virgin/UMTV	9 October 2004	2
Various artists	Big Tunes: Living for the Weekend	Ministry of Sound	23 October 2004	2
Various artists	Pop Party 2	BMG/EMI Virgin/UMTV	6 November 2004	3
Various artists	Now That's What I Call Music! 59 †	EMI Virgin/UMTV	27 November 2004	7
2005
Various artists	R&B Anthems 2005	BMG TV/Sony TV	15 January 2005	5
Various artists	Love Songs	UMTV	19 February 2005	1
Various artists	Clubmix 2005	UMTV	26 February 2005	2
Various artists	I Love Mum	EMI Virgin	12 March 2005	1
Various artists	Essential R&B: Spring 2005	Sony BMG/UMTV	19 March 2005	2
Various artists	Now That's What I Call Music! 60	EMI Virgin/UMTV	2 April 2005	5
Various artists	Happy Songs	EMI Virgin	7 May 2005	1
Various artists	Clubland X-Treme Hardcore	UMTV/AATW	14 May 2005	1
Various artists	Happy Songs	EMI Virgin	21 May 2005	1
Various artists	Massive R&B	Sony BMG/UMTV	28 May 2005	2
Various artists	Driving Rock Ballads	EMI Virgin	11 June 2005	1
Various artists	Dad Rocks	EMI Virgin	18 June 2005	2
Various artists	Hairbrush Divas Presents Sing-a-Long Summer	WSM	2 July 2005	1
Various artists	Clubland 7	UMTV/AATW	9 July 2005	1
Various artists	Gatecrasher Classics	Ministry of Sound	16 July 2005	3
Various artists	Now That's What I Call Music! 61	EMI Virgin/UMTV	6 August 2005	7
Various artists	Dance Party	Sony BMG/UMTV	24 September 2005	2
Various artists	Acoustic Love	WSM	8 October 2005	4
Various artists	Pop Party 3	Sony BMG TV/UMTV	5 November 2005	4
Various artists	Now That's What I Call Music! 62 †	EMI Virgin/UMTV	3 December 2005	6
2006
Various artists	Clubbers Guide 2006	Ministry of Sound	14 January 2006	4
Various artists	R&B Lovesongs	Sony BMG TV/UMTV	11 February 2006	3
Various artists	Brit Awards 2006 – The Music Event	Sony BMG TV	4 March 2006	1
Various artists	The Mash Up Mix 2006	Ministry of Sound	11 March 2006	1
Various artists	Clubland X-treme Hardcore 2	AATW/UMTV	18 March 2006	2
Various artists	World's Best Mum	Sony BMG TV	1 April 2006	1
Various artists	Floorfillers: Club Classics	AATW/UMTV	8 April 2006	2
Various artists	Now That's What I Call Music! 63	EMI Virgin/UMTV	22 April 2006	5
Various artists	Big Club Hits	UMTV	27 May 2006	3
Various artists	England: The Album	EMI Virgin/Sony TV	17 June 2006	1
Various artists	Dad Rocks	EMI Virgin	17 June 2006	1
Various artists	Clubbers Guide Summer 2006	Ministry of Sound	1 July 2006	1
Various artists	Clubland 9	AATW/UMTV	8 July 2006	4
Various artists	Now That's What I Call Music! 64	EMI Virgin/UMTV	5 August 2006	6
Various artists	Dance Mania	AATW/UMTV	16 September 2006	3
Original soundtrack	High School Musical	Walt Disney	7 October 2006	3
Various artists	Radio 1's Live Lounge	Sony BMG TV	28 October 2006	1
Original soundtrack	High School Musical	Walt Disney	4 November 2006	1
Various artists	Radio 1's Live Lounge	Sony BMG TV	11 November 2006	1
Various artists	Clubland 10	AATW/UMTV	18 November 2006	1
Various artists	Pop Party 4	Sony BMG TV/UMTV	25 November 2006	1
Various artists	Now That's What I Call Music! 65 †	EMI Virgin/UMTV	1 December 2006	6
2007
Various artists	Radio 1's Live Lounge	Sony BMG TV	13 January 2007	5
Various artists	One Love	UMTV	17 February 2007	2
Various artists	Brit Hits: The Album of the Year	UMTV	3 March 2007	2
Various artists	101 80s Hits	EMI Virgin	17 March 2007	1
Various artists	To Mum with Love	UMTV	24 March 2007	1
Various artists	Floorfillers Anthems	AATW/UMTV	31 March 2007	2
Various artists	Now That's What I Call Music! 66	EMI Virgin/UMTV	14 April 2007	6
Various artists	Massive R&B: Spring Collection 2007	UMTV	26 May 2007	3
Various artists	Over the Rainbow	UCJ	16 June 2007	1
Various artists	Top Gear Anthems	EMI Virgin	23 June 2007	1
Various artists	Clubland 11	AATW/UMTV	30 June 2007	3
Various artists	R&B Love Collection	UMTV	21 July 2007	2
Various artists	Now That's What I Call Music! 67	EMI Virgin/UMTV	4 August 2007	3
Original soundtrack	High School Musical 2	Walt Disney	25 August 2007	7
Various artists	Radio 1 Established 1967	EMI Virgin/Sony/UMTV	4 August 2007	3
Various artists	Radio 1's Live Lounge – Volume 2	Sony BMG/UMTV	3 November 2007	2
Various artists	Clubland 12	AATW/UMTV	17 November 2007	1
Various artists	Pop Party 5	EMI Virgin/UMTV	24 November 2007	1
Various artists	Now That's What I Call Music! 68 †	EMI Virgin/UMTV	1 December 2007	7
2008
Various artists	Ministry of Sound – Anthems 1991-2008	Ministry of Sound	19 January 2008	3
Various artists	Big Tunes 2008	Hard2Beat	26 January 2008	3
Various artists	Ultimate NRG 3	AATW/UMTV	16 February 2008	1
Various artists	Real Love	UMTV	23 February 2008	1
Various artists	The Very Best of Euphoric Dance	Ministry of Sound	1 March 2008	1
Various artists	You Raise Me Up 2008	UCJ	8 March 2008	1
Various artists	The Very Best of Euphoric Dance	Ministry of Sound	15 March 2008	1
Various artists	Floorfillers '08	UMTV	22 March 2008	1
Various artists	Now That's What I Call Music! 69	EMI Virgin/UMTV	29 March 2008	3
Various artists	Clubland Classix – The Album of Your Life	AATW/UMTV	19 April 2008	6
Various artists	Chilled: 1991-2008	Ministry of Sound	31 May 2008	5
Various artists	Clubland 13	AATW/UMTV	5 July 2008	2
Original soundtrack	Mamma Mia! The Movie Soundtrack †	Polydor	19 July 2008	2
Various artists	Now That's What I Call Music! 70	EMI Virgin/UMTV	2 August 2008	3
Original soundtrack	Mamma Mia! The Movie Soundtrack †	Polydor	23 August 2008	8
Various artists	Massive R&B – Winter 2008	UMTV	18 October 2008	2
Original soundtrack	High School Musical 3: Senior Year	Walt Disney	1 November 2008	3
Various artists	Clubland 14	AATW/UMTV	22 November 2008	1
Various artists	Now That's What I Call Music! 71	EMI Virgin/UMTV	29 November 2008	7
2009
Original soundtrack	Mamma Mia! The Movie Soundtrack	Polydor	17 January 2009	1
Various artists	Motown 50	UMTV	24 January 2009	4
Various artists	R&B Love Songs 2009	RCA/Rhino	21 February 2009	1
Various artists	BRIT Awards 2009	Sony Music	28 February 2009	1
Various artists	Mash Up Euphoria – Mixed by the Cut Up	Ministry of Sound	7 March 2009	1
Various artists	Addicted to Bass 2009	Ministry of Sound	14 March 2009	2
Various artists	101 Housework Songs	EMI Virgin	28 March 2009	1
Various artists	Clubland Classix 2	AATW/UMTV	4 April 2009	2
Various artists	Now That's What I Call Music! 72	EMI Virgin/UMTV	18 April 2009	5
Various artists	R&B Collection: Summer 2009	UMTV	23 May 2009	1
Various artists	Chilled 2: 1991-2009	Ministry of Sound	30 May 2009	5
Various artists	Clubland 15	UMTV	4 July 2009	2
Various artists	Gatecrashers Trance Anthems – 1993-2009	Rhino	18 July 2009	2
Various artists	Now That's What I Call Music! 73	EMI Virgin/UMTV	1 August 2009	10
Various artists	Big Tunes – Back 2 the 90s	Hard2Beat	10 October 2009	1
Various artists	Now That's What I Call Music! 73	EMI Virgin/UMTV	17 October 2009	2
Original soundtrack	The Twilight Saga: New Moon	Atlantic	31 October 2009	1
Various artists	Radio 1's Live Lounge – Volume 4	Sony Music/UMTV	8 November 2009	1
Various artists	Dreamboats and Petticoats 3	EMI TV/UMTV	14 November 2009	1
Various artists	Clubland 16	AATW/UMTV	21 November 2009	1
Various artists	Words For You	Island	28 November 2009	1
Various artists	Now That's What I Call Music! 74 †	EMI Virgin/UMTV	5 December 2009	6
