= Hits 93 Volume 1 =

Compilation album by Various Artists
- Released: 8 February 1993
- Recorded: Various
- Label: Telstar, BMG

The Hits Albums chronology
The Hits Album (15) (1991)	Hits 93 Volume 1 (1993)	Hits 93 Volume 2 (1993)

Hits 93 Volume 1 is a compilation album released by Telstar Records and BMG in February 1993. The original Hits Album compilation series had effectively been retired in 1991 by the original partners in the series CBS (now Sony BMG) and WEA (now WSM), and this release saw BMG, who originally joined CBS and WEA in 1986, revive the Hits brand with specialist TV marketing company Telstar.

The series differs from the original Hits albums, the main difference being that the Hits 93 series were all issued as a single-CD/MC/LP format, replacing the traditional double albums released from Hits 1 onwards (although notably, Hits 5 and Hits 6 were both issued as a condensed version of the double LP/MC, while The Hit Pack was a slightly shortened version of the single LP/MC formats).

The track listings of these Hits albums were mainly compiled around popular dance music of the year, whereas the earlier volumes contained a larger proportion of AOR, rock and pop music. This and subsequent volumes did contain a small amount of more contemporary chart music, but these were often listed awkwardly amongst the dance hits on the collections.

Hits 93 Volume 1 was a very successful compilation; it reached number 1 in the UK Top 20 Compilations chart for three consecutive weeks, and achieved a Platinum BPI award.

== Track listing ==
1. Snap! – "Exterminate!"
2. West End featuring Sybil – "The Love I Lost"
3. 2 Unlimited – "No Limit"
4. Take That – "Could It Be Magic"
5. Annie Lennox – "Love Song for a Vampire"
6. Undercover – "I Wanna Stay with You"
7. M People – "How Can I Love You More? (Remix)"
8. U.S.U.R.A. – "Open Your Mind"
9. Arrested Development – "Mr. Wendal (Edit)"
10. Moodswings – "Spiritual High (State of Independence)"
11. Lisa Stansfield – "Someday (I'm Coming Back)"
12. The Shamen – "Phorever People"
13. Rapination featuring Kym Mazelle – "Love Me the Right Way"
14. The Time Frequency – "New Emotion"
15. WWF Superstars – "Slam Jam"
16. Nick Haverson – "Heads over Heels"
17. Tom Jones – "All You Need Is Love"
18. Go West – "What You Won't Do for Love"

== See also ==
- The Hits Album
- Hits 93 Volume 2
- Hits 93 Volume 3
- Hits 93 Volume 4
- Hits 94 Volume 1
- Now That's What I Call Music
