= Hits 53 =

Compilation album by Various Artists
- Released: 29 July 2002
- Label: Sony Music Entertainment UK/WEA/RCA Ariola/BMG/Telstar UK

Various Artists chronology
| Hits 52 (2002) | Hits 53 (2002) | Hits 54 (2002) |

Hits 53 is a compilation album released in the UK in July 2002. It contains 41 tracks on two CDs, including four number one singles from the UK Singles Chart from Gareth Gates, Will Young, Holly Valance, and Liberty X.

The music video for Gareth Gates song "Anyone of Us (Stupid Mistake)" is featured on disc two as a special enhanced feature, available to watch when put into a PC.

"Underneath Your Clothes" by Shakira is sometimes given in online track listings but does not feature in the end - instead "Whenever, Wherever" features (Hits 52 previously featured this song in Spanish language).

== Track listing ==
Disc one

| No. | Title | Artist | Length |
|---|---|---|---|
| 1. | "Anyone of Us (Stupid Mistake)" | Gareth Gates | 3:48 |
| 2. | "Light My Fire" | Will Young | 3:29 |
| 3. | "Kiss Kiss" | Holly Valance | 3:23 |
| 4. | "Bop Bop Baby" | Westlife | 3:56 |
| 5. | "Wherever You Will Go" | The Calling | 3:26 |
| 6. | "Stop Crying Your Heart Out" | Oasis | 4:58 |
| 7. | "Make It Good" | A1 | 3:35 |
| 8. | "DJ" | H & Claire | 3:41 |
| 9. | "Luv Da Sunshine" | Intenso Project | 3:20 |
| 10. | "Insatiable" | Darren Hayes | 5:04 |
| 11. | "Whenever, Wherever" | Shakira | 3:16 |
| 12. | "My Culture" | 1 Giant Leap | 3:38 |
| 13. | "Hungry" | Kosheen | 3:25 |
| 14. | "One Step Too Far" | Faithless featuring Dido | 3:24 |
| 15. | "Take It Easy" | 3SL | 3:11 |
| 16. | "Lazy" | X-Press 2 featuring David Byrne | 4:07 |
| 17. | "Beautiful" | Matt Darey featuring Marcella Woods | 3:36 |
| 18. | "At Night" | Shakedown | 3:04 |
| 19. | "Reckless Girl" | The Beginerz | 3:06 |
| 20. | "Reason" | Ian Van Dahl | 2:59 |
| 21. | "Just the Way You Are" | Milky | 3:30 |
| 22. | "Follow da Leader 2002" | Nigel and Marvin | 2:31 |

Disc two

| No. | Title | Artist | Length |
|---|---|---|---|
| 1. | "I'm Gonna Be Alright" (Trackmasters Remix) | Jennifer Lopez featuring 50 Cent | 3:54 |
| 2. | "Just a Little" | Liberty X | 3:53 |
| 3. | "Roll On" (Rishi Rich Bhangrahop Edit) | Mis-Teeq | 3:45 |
| 4. | "What's Luv?" | Fat Joe featuring Ashanti | 3:50 |
| 5. | "Oops (Oh My)" | Tweet featuring Missy Elliott | 3:31 |
| 6. | "What About Us?" | Brandy | 3:57 |
| 7. | "Don't Let Me Get Me" | Pink | 3:30 |
| 8. | "Fallin' for You" | Ashley | 3:05 |
| 9. | "Corner of the Earth" | Jamiroquai | 3:54 |
| 10. | "You Might Be Wrong" | Nicole Russo | 3:00 |
| 11. | "4 My People" (Basement Jaxx Radio Edit) | Missy Elliott | 3:35 |
| 12. | "Nasty Girl" | Destiny's Child | 4:16 |
| 13. | "A Woman's Worth" | Alicia Keys | 4:18 |
| 14. | "A New Day Has Come" | Celine Dion | 4:38 |
| 15. | "Oh Baby" | Rhianna | 3:16 |
| 16. | "Come Back" | Jessica Garlick featuring United Colours of Sound | 2:53 |
| 17. | "Tell It to My Heart" | Kelly Llorenna | 3:24 |
| 18. | "Shooting Star" | Flip & Fill | 3:13 |
| 19. | "We're on the Ball" (Official England Song for the 2002 FIFA World Cup) | Ant & Dec | 2:46 |
