= Hits 96 =

Compilation album by various artists
- Released: 23 December 1995
- Label: Global TV, Warner Music TV

Various artists chronology
Hitz Blitz (1995)	Hits 96 (1995)	New Hits 96 (1996)

Hits 96 is a compilation album released in 1995. Part of the Hits compilation series, it contains UK hit singles from the second half of 1995. The album reached number 1 on the UK compilations chart and was at number 1 for a total of five weeks.

Following the relative success of Global Television's Hitz Blitz, it was decided to revive the Hits brand full-time with a double-album release. Warner Music, one of the original partners of the Hits series, returned to the series for the first time since 1991's The Hits Album (15).

The album was released in 1995 - but copies of the album incorrectly state the album's copyright date as 1996.

Hits 96 was a rival to Now 32, the year-ending chart release of Hits's main rival series, Now That's What I Call Music!, though the releases were released a month apart. Unlike Now 35, which culled chart hits from mid to late 1995, Hits 96 actually collected chart hits from as early as 1993, as is the case with its album closer, "Boom! Shake the Room" from DJ Jazzy Jeff & The Fresh Prince

Number ones included: I Believe, Fairground, Never Forget and Boom! Shake the Room (Remix)

== Track listing ==
=== Disc one ===
1. Robson & Jerome - "I Believe"
2. Enya - "Anywhere Is"
3. Everything but the Girl - "Missing"
4. Simply Red - "Fairground"
5. TLC - "Waterfalls"
6. Corona - "I Don't Wanna Be a Star"
7. N-Trance featuring Ricardo da Force - "Stayin' Alive"
8. Berri - "Sunshine After the Rain"
9. The Original - "I Luv U Baby"
10. Dorothy - "What's That Tune?"
11. Take That - "Never Forget"
12. Frank Bruno - "Eye of the Tiger"
13. De'Lacy - "Hideaway"
14. Michelle Gayle - "Happy Just To Be With You"
15. Mr. Roy - "Something About U (Can't Be Beat)"
16. Happy Clappers - "I Believe"
17. Molella featuring The Outhere Brothers - "If You Wanna Party"
18. Motiv8 and Kym Mazelle - "Searching for the Golden Eye"
19. Pérez Prado - "Guaglione"
20. Smokie featuring Roy 'Chubby' Brown - "Living Next Door to Alice (Who The F**k Is Alice?) (Bleeped)"

=== Disc two ===
1. Oasis - "Wonderwall"
2. Pulp - "Common People"
3. Supergrass - "Alright"
4. Björk - "It's Oh So Quiet"
5. Garbage - "Queer"
6. Echobelly - "King of the Kerb"
7. Edwyn Collins - "A Girl Like You"
8. Erasure - "Fingers & Thumbs (Cold Summer's Day)"
9. Saint Etienne - "He's on the Phone"
10. Sleeper - "What Do I Do Now?"
11. Cher - "Walking in Memphis"
12. Annie Lennox - "Waiting in Vain"
13. Seal - "Prayer for the Dying"
14. Suggs - "I'm Only Sleeping"
15. M People - "Love Rendezvous"
16. Jodeci - "Love U 4 Life"
17. Mary J. Blige - "(You Make Me Feel Like) A Natural Woman"
18. Louise Seville - "Yah Mo B There"
19. R. Kelly - "You Remind Me of Something"
20. DJ Jazzy Jeff & The Fresh Prince - "Boom! Shake the Room (Remix)"
