= Be My World =

Single by Milky

from the album Star
- Released: 2003
- Genre: Dance-pop
- Length: 3:48
- Label: Robbins; Universal; Multiply Records; Motivo
- Songwriters: Giuliano Sacchetto; Giordano Trivellato
- Producers: Giuliano Sacchetto; Giordano Trivellato

Milky singles chronology
"In My Mind" (2002)	"Be My World" (2003)

"Be My World" is a song by the Italian house group Milky. It was released in 2003 on Robbins Entertainment, Universal Music Group, Multiply Records and Motivo Productions as the third single and as well as the second track from their only studio album, Star (2002). It is a dance-pop song that was written and produced by Giuliano Sacchetto and Giordano Trivellato.

== Track listing ==
No.	Title	Length
1.	"Be My World" (radio edit)	3:43
2.	"Be My World" (extended mix)	6:19
3.	"Non So Perché (Be My World)" (radio edit)	3:43
4.	"Just The Way You Are" (Gardeweg remix)	6:03

== Charts ==
Chart (2005–06)	Peak position
Sweden (Sverigetopplistan)	52
US Dance/Mix Show Airplay (Billboard)	4
