= Monster Hits =

Compilation album by Various Artists
- Released: 20 November 1989
- Recorded: Various
- Label: CBS/WEA/BMG

The Hits Albums chronology
The Hits Album 10 (1989)	Monster Hits (1989)	Snap It Up! Monster Hits 2 (1990)

Monster Hits or Hits 11 is the eleventh release of the Hits compilation Series. It was released on 20 November 1989 in the United Kingdom and it debuted at number two on the UK Compilation Chart (kept off by its rival Now 16). The album was issued on vinyl, double cassette and double compact disc and featured 32 tracks.

The Hits compilation series began in 1984 and had become a successful brand for its compilers, the partnership comprising CBS, WEA and BMG with healthy sales rivalling that even of the hugely successful Now series. However, it is with this release (and, to a lesser extent, The Hits Album in 1988) that the compilers began altering the format of the Hits series and there would be several more rebrands in the years to come.

Monster Hits includes three songs which reached number one on the UK Singles Chart: "Ride On Time", "All Around The World" and "That's What I Like".

An accompanying video release from BMG Video, Monster Hits Video Selection, contained a selection of 15 tracks from the album. It was released on VHS.

== Track listing ==
Catalogue Number: CDHITS11

=== CD/Record/Tape 1 ===
1. Black Box - "Ride On Time (Massive Mix)"
2. Starlight - "Numero Uno"
3. Gloria Estefan - "Oye Mi Canto (Hear My Voice)"
4. Kaoma - "Lambada"
5. Lisa Stansfield - "All Around the World"
6. Raúl Orellana - "The Real Wild House (Radio Mix)"
7. The Beloved - "The Sun Rising"
8. Martika - "I Feel the Earth Move"
9. Madonna - "Cherish" (7" Remix)
10. Eurythmics - "Don't Ask Me Why"
11. Chris Rea - "The Road to Hell (Part 2)"
12. Cher - "If I Could Turn Back Time" (7" Remix)
13. Aerosmith - "Love in an Elevator"
14. Alice Cooper - "Poison"
15. The Jesus and Mary Chain - "Head On"
16. Fuzzbox - "Walking on Thin Ice"

=== CD/Record/Tape 2 ===
1. Simply Red - "You've Got It"
2. Luther Vandross - "Never Too Much (Remix '89 by Justin Strauss)"
3. Sybil - "Don't Make Me Over"
4. Alyson Williams - "I Need Your Lovin'"
5. Prince - "Partyman"
6. Karyn White - "Secret Rendezvous"
7. Donna Summer - "Love's About to Change My Heart" (PWL 7" Remix)
8. Liza Minnelli - "Losing My Mind"
9. Jive Bunny and the Mastermixers - "That's What I Like"
10. London Boys - "My Love"
11. Big Fun - "Blame It on the Boogie"
12. Bros - "Chocolate Box"
13. Sam Dees - "After All"
14. Fast Eddie featuring Sundance - "Git On Up"
15. Beatmasters featuring Betty Boo - "Hey DJ!/I Can't Dance (To That Music You're Playing)"
16. 808 State - "Pacific 707"

== Video Selection ==
1. Lisa Stansfield - "All Around the World"
2. Gloria Estefan - "Oye Mi Canto (Hear My Voice)"
3. Eurythmics - "Don't Ask Me Why"
4. Simply Red - "You've Got It"
5. Chris Rea - "The Road to Hell (Part 2)"
6. Luther Vandross - "Never Too Much (Remix '89 by Justin Strauss)"
7. Liza Minnelli - "Losing My Mind"
8. London Boys - "My Love"
9. Bros - "Chocolate Box"
10. Fast Eddie featuring Sundance - "Git On Up"
11. The Beloved - "The Sun Rising"
12. Kaoma - "Lambada"
13. Fuzzbox - "Walking on Thin Ice"
14. Martika - "I Feel the Earth Move"
15. Alice Cooper - "Poison"

== Certification ==
Region	Certification	Certified units/sales
Japan (RIAJ)	Gold	100,000^{^}
^{^} Shipments figures based on certification alone.
