= Motown 25: Yesterday, Today, Forever =

1983 television special

- Newspaper ad for the airing of the special on Los Angeles NBC O&O KNBC
- Written by: Buz Kohan; Ruth Robinson; Suzanne de Passe
- Directed by: Don Mischer
- Country of origin: United States
- Original language: English

Production
- Executive producer: Suzanne de Passe
- Producers: Don Mischer; Buz Kohan; Suzanne Coston
- Production locations: Pasadena Civic Auditorium, Pasadena, California, USA
- Camera setup: Multi-camera
- Running time: 130 minutes
- Production company: Motown Pictures

Original release
- Network: NBC
- Release: May 16, 1983

Motown 25: Yesterday, Today, Forever was a 1983 television special which commemorated the 25th anniversary of Motown Records. Produced by Motown executive Suzanne de Passe, the program was taped before a live audience at the Pasadena Civic Auditorium in Pasadena, California, on March 25, 1983, and broadcast on NBC on May 16. Among its highlights were Michael Jackson's performance of "Billie Jean" (which popularized the moonwalk and was also the only non-Motown song performed on Motown 25), Smokey Robinson's reunion with the Miracles, a Temptations/Four Tops "battle of the bands", Marvin Gaye's inspired speech about black music history and his memorable performance of "What's Going On", a Jackson 5 reunion, and an abbreviated reunion of Diana Ross & the Supremes, who performed their final #1 hit, "Someday We'll Be Together" from 1969. The show was written by Buz Kohan, Ruth Robinson, and de Passe. The broadcast was watched by over 47 million viewers.

== Performances ==
=== Junior Walker ===
Junior Walker performed 30 seconds of his signature hit "Shotgun". It was performed as a solo; the All-Stars, his long-time group, did not participate.

=== Lionel Richie/The Commodores ===
Lionel Richie performed his hit "You Mean More to Me" in a pre-taped segment. Appearing with him was Lynette Butler, identified as a "Sickle Cell Poster Child". Richie did not appear with his former group the Commodores, who appeared without him on a separate live segment of the special, singing "Brick House", which was led, as on the original recording, by Commodore Walter "Clyde" Orange. The other original Commodores, William King, Ron LaPread, Milan Williams, and Thomas McClary were present and performed on this segment.

=== Marvin Gaye ===
Marvin Gaye, who had left the label a year before to sign with Columbia Records and had a current hit with "Sexual Healing", agreed at the last minute to join the roster of other Motown legends to perform. When he came on, he played the piano and gave the audience a narrative of black music history before he stepped off the piano and sang his classic 1971 hit, "What's Going On", to thunderous applause. Gaye's performance on the show, following his appearances on February 23, 1983, on the Grammys and the NBA All-Star Game, was one of his final national television appearances before his murder by his own father on April 1, 1984.

=== Mary Wells and Martha Reeves ===
The 'first lady of Motown' Mary Wells and Vandellas frontwoman Martha Reeves were each given a 30-second spot, singing their respective hits, "My Guy" and "Heatwave". Reeves was a large aspect of what came from Motown in the following decades in the 1960s through the 1970s. Reeves performed without other original Vandellas members. Thus, the impact was strongly present throughout the 1960s due to the types of music being produced during this time. This music had a direct impact on the Civil Rights Movement. "Approximately four months after Martin Luther King Jr. appeared at Detroit’s Great March to Freedom, Malcolm X came to the Motor City. On November 10, 1963, the Nation of Islam’s most famous minister delivered his “Message to the Grass Roots” speech at the city’s Northern Negro Grass Roots Leadership Conference".

=== The Jackson 5/Michael Jackson ===
Michael Jackson, who had recently released his worldwide best-selling album Thriller, was reunited with The Jackson 5 to perform a medley of their hits "I Want You Back", "The Love You Save", "Never Can Say Goodbye", and "I'll Be There". Jermaine was also there, performing with his brothers for the first time since leaving the group in 1975, and brother Randy joined the group for the medley as well. (Note: When Jermaine left the Jackson 5 for a solo career, Randy had replaced him.) Michael initially turned down the opportunity to perform at the show, believing he had appeared too frequently on television at that time, but at Motown founder Berry Gordy's request, he agreed to perform if he was allotted time for a solo spot, to which Gordy agreed.

Widely hailed as his breakthrough performance as a solo artist, Michael's solo performance followed the Jackson 5 performance. Michael danced while miming to the studio recording of "Billie Jean", which at the time was in the middle of a seven-week run atop the Billboard Hot 100 music charts and was the only non-Motown song performed on the show. This was also the first time he performed what would become his most famous signature move, the moonwalk.

In the years followed, Jackson's concert performances of "Billie Jean" would mirror his appearance at Motown 25, from the opening pose with the fedora, black sequin jacket, and glove, to the moonwalk routine in the song's bridge.

=== The Miracles ===
This special marked the reunion of Motown VP Smokey Robinson with his original group the Miracles: Bobby Rogers, Pete Moore, Claudette Robinson (then wife of Smokey), and Marv Tarplin (who was on stage with them, slightly off-camera to the right, but can be seen in certain shots) for the first time since he left the group 11 years before (in 1972). Original Miracles member Ronnie White did not participate in the reunion because his wife, Earlyn, died that year. As Motown's first group and the label's first million-selling act, they were first on the show, singing a medley of short excerpts from four of their greatest hits, "Shop Around", "You've Really Got a Hold on Me", "The Tears of a Clown", and "Going to a Go-Go".

=== Stevie Wonder ===
Stevie Wonder, accompanied by his band and his girl group Wonderlove sang several of his greatest hits, including "I Wish", "Uptight (Everything's Alright)", "Signed, Sealed, Delivered I'm Yours", "You Are the Sunshine of My Life", "My Cherie Amour", "Sir Duke", and also preceded by a vintage clip of Wonder singing his first hit "Fingertips".

=== Diana Ross/The Supremes ===
Motown 25 was to be a showcase for the highly-awaited reunion of the Supremes: Diana Ross, Mary Wilson and Supremes replacement Cindy Birdsong (original member Florence Ballard had died in 1976) as the show's finale. Four of their greatest hits were to be performed in a medley including "Baby Love" and "Stop! In the Name of Love", however in a short, hectic rehearsal, it was decided to cut the four-hit medley down to only "Someday We'll Be Together".

Richard Pryor opened the segment with a fairy-tale story of 'three maidens from the Projects of Brewster' which was then followed with a montage of various Supremes and Ross solo video clips. Ross then started walking down the center aisle of the auditorium, to the stage, accompanied by the recording of her 1970 solo hit "Ain't No Mountain High Enough". When the song finished, Ross, now onstage, made a brief speech about 'the night that everyone came back' (although some of the surviving artists and musicians had not been invited). After the beginning bars of "Someday We'll Be Together", Birdsong entered from stage left, Wilson from stage right. The Supremes were now reunited, for the first time since 1970.

Shortly after the first verse, Ross introduced Wilson and Birdsong to the audience while Wilson took over the lead vocals during this segment while Ross introduced Motown labelmates such as Smokey Robinson, Stevie Wonder, Michael Jackson, the Temptations, Adam Ant and others as they quickly filled the stage for an impromptu finale. Although producer Suzanne de Passe had instructed Ross to introduce Gordy after leading the finale (a fact unknown to Mary Wilson), Wilson decided to do the honors by calling Berry down herself. Additionally, earlier in the program, Wilson made a brief tribute to Ballard, and former label mate Paul Williams of the Temptations.

By the time the reunion aired on May 16, a physical "pushing/shoving" incident between Ross and Wilson, as witnessed by the stunned audience, had been widely reported, including an article and pictures in Us Weekly. The unexpected, truncated performance resulted in significant negative publicity for the group, which never re-united again.

The altercation, which reportedly occurred shortly after the Wilson/Birdsong introductions (necessitating the affable Robinson to first come to the trio as a peacemaker, followed seconds later by the other Motown artists, one-by-one) was edited out of the television airing, and remains unseen.

=== The Temptations/Four Tops ===
The Temptations and the Four Tops competed in a "Battle of the Bands" style event. The only original or "Classic Five" Temptations performing were Melvin Franklin and Otis Williams, as Eddie Kendricks (who left the group in 1971) and David Ruffin (who left in 1968 and was replaced by Dennis Edwards) had a falling out with the group. Paul Williams (who also left in 1971) had died in 1973, and Al Bryant (who left and was replaced by Ruffin in 1964) had died in 1975. Joining Williams and Franklin were then-Temptations Dennis Edwards, Richard Street, and Ron Tyson.

All of the original members of the Four Tops performed: Renaldo "Obie" Benson, Abdul "Duke" Fakir, and Lawrence Payton, with Levi Stubbs providing the lead vocals. The two groups performed "Reach Out I'll Be There", "Baby I Need Your Loving", "Get Ready", "I Can't Help Myself (Sugar Pie Honey Bunch)", "My Girl" "Ain't Too Proud to Beg" and "I Can't Get Next to You", among other numbers. The joint performance was a success, and the Temptations and Four Tops toured together for two years following the special.

This "battle" later returned in the TV special Motown Returns to the Apollo and created a long running tour for the two groups to compete in.

=== Others ===
While Motown 25 was billed as "Yesterday, Today, Forever", artists from the golden era of Motown, such as the Marvelettes, the Vandellas, the Contours, Kim Weston, Brenda Holloway, Marv Johnson, Jimmy Ruffin, Edwin Starr, Gladys Knight & the Pips, Rare Earth, the Isley Brothers, and the Velvelettes were not included in the special, while newer artists such as DeBarge, High Inergy and José Feliciano (who paid homage to Gordy singing "Lonely Teardrops") were. (Singers Nick Ashford and Valerie Simpson appeared onstage at the end with the other artists, but they did not perform.) Non-Motown artists, such as Adam Ant (who paid homage to the Supremes singing "Where Did Our Love Go" with Diana Ross) and Linda Ronstadt were featured as well. Ronstadt performed "Ooh Baby Baby" and "Tracks of My Tears" with Smokey Robinson. She had hits with both songs and in 1976 her version of the Miracles' "Tracks of My Tears" even went to No. 12 on the Billboard Country Singles Chart, a first for a Motown song.

According to the documentary Standing in the Shadows of Motown, James Jamerson, a key player behind the Motown sound, and member of the Funk Brothers who recorded many of the backing tracks to the Motown hits, had to buy a Motown 25 ticket from a scalper and sat at the back of the hall with the general public. In addition, the "Motown Sound", which Motown producer Paul Riser would later credit the Funk Brothers and the musicians at Motown of creating in Standing in the Shadows of Motown, was crudely trivialized during a segment in Motown 25 where executives and employees at Motown, and even Gordy himself, gave all kind of answers to what the Motown Sound was—with no answer giving credit to the musicians.

Additional appearances were made by Dick Clark, Howard Hesseman and Tim Reid (reprising their WKRP in Cincinnati roles as disc jockeys), fast-talker John Moschitta Jr., T.G. Sheppard (who recorded for Motown's 1970s country label and had two #1 hits on Billboard's country chart), Billy Dee Williams, and the Lester Wilson Dancers. Additionally, clips of Rick James and The Mary Jane Girls were featured.

== TV ratings ==
The special was the highest-viewed prime time show in the United States for the week. 9pm to 11pm; Rating: 22.8; Viewers: 33.9 million

== Physical releases ==
=== Video release ===
==== Charts ====
| Chart (1986) | Peak position |
|---|---|
| US Top Music Videos (Billboard) | 2 |

==== Certifications ====
| Region | Certification | Certified units/sales |
|---|---|---|
| United States (RIAA) | Platinum | 100,000^{^} |
^{^} Shipments figures based on certification alone.

=== DVD release ===
Motown 25 was released on DVD through Star Vista Entertainment/Time Life in six-DVD, three-DVD and one-DVD versions on September 30, 2014. Prior to this, the special could only be found on VHS, Laserdisc and a rare pre-recorded 8mm tape. The only footage of Motown 25 on DVD was Michael Jackson's performance of "Billie Jean" which was officially released on the HIStory on Film, Volume II DVD and the DVD included in Thriller 25. There are some differences between the VHS video release and the DVD. On the VHS version, there are a few shots of Berry Gordy seated in the audience that are omitted on the DVD. In addition, some vintage clips that were used on the original broadcast and on the VHS release were replaced, most notably during the Supremes "Stop! In the Name of Love" montage where several different clips of the Supremes singing the word "Stop!" were edited together. The majority of the clips replaced appear to be from a taping of the British show Ready, Steady, Go!: The Sounds of Motown, that featured, along with the Supremes, the Temptations, the Miracles, Martha and the Vandellas, and Stevie Wonder.

=== Album release ===
The original vinyl release of the album, narrated by Lionel Richie and Smokey Robinson, was produced by Jon Badeaux in 1983. The name of that release is The Motown Story: First 25 Years. That album received a Grammy nomination for Best Historical Recording at the 26th Annual Grammy Awards.

==== Charts ====
===== The Motown Story: First 25 Years =====
| Chart (1983) | Peak position |
|---|---|
| US Billboard 200 | 114 |

===== Motown 25 =====
| Chart (2013) | Peak position |
|---|---|
| US Billboard 200 | 53 |
| US Top R&B/Hip-Hop Albums (Billboard) | 11 |

== Legacy ==
Ruth Adkins Robinson and Suzanne de Passe would continue writing shows together for the next 25 years, including other Motown tributes.

Another similar television special, Motown 45, hosted by Lionel Richie and Cedric the Entertainer, was held on May 17, 2004. Performers included Backstreet Boys, the Four Tops, Macy Gray, Nick Lachey, Smokey Robinson, and a re-imagining of The Supremes with Kelly Rowland of Destiny's Child with "former" Supreme Cindy Birdsong and "original" Supreme Mary Wilson.

A compilation entitled, Motown 50 was released on December 1, 2008, to coincide with the 50th anniversary of Motown Records.

On April 21, 2019, Motown 60: A Grammy Celebration, premiered on CBS featuring Smokey Robinson, Diana Ross, Stevie Wonder, Boyz II Men, Tori Kelly, John Legend, Ciara and more.
