= Hits 54 =

Compilation album by various artists
- Released: 25 November 2002
- Genre: Pop
- Label: Sony Music Entertainment UK/WEA/RCA Ariola/BMG/Telstar UK

Various artists chronology
Hits 53 (2002)	Hits 54 (2002)	Huge Hits 2003 (2002)

Hits 54 is a compilation album released in the UK in November 2002. It contains 40 tracks on two CDs, including three number one singles on the UK Singles Chart from Will Young & Gareth Gates, Las Ketchup, and Blazin' Squad.

"The Long and Winding Road"'s music video is featured on disc two as a special enhanced feature able to be watched when put into a PC. The song itself opens disc one.

Milky's "Just the Way You Are" was previously featured on Hits 53.

== Track listing ==
Disc one

No.	Title	Artist	Length
1.	"The Long and Winding Road"	Will Young and Gareth Gates	3:29
2.	"Down Boy"	Holly Valance	3:26
3.	"The Ketchup Song (Aserejé)"	Las Ketchup	3:34
4.	"Nu Flow"	Big Brovaz	3:21
5.	"Got to Have Your Love"	Liberty X	3:54
6.	"When I Lost You"	Sarah Whatmore	3:28
7.	"Blink"	Rosie Ribbons	3:10
8.	"What You Got"	Abs	3:56
9.	"Touch Me, Tease Me"	3SL featuring Estelle	3:49
10.	"Wish I Didn't Miss You"	Angie Stone	4:32
11.	"Call Me"	Tweet	3:07
12.	"Cheeky"	Boniface featuring Lady Luck	3:36
13.	"Dem Girlz (I Don't Know Why)"	Oxide & Neutrino featuring Kowdean	5:03
14.	"The Heartless Theme (The Superglue Riddim)"	Heartless Crew	3:17
15.	"Weak Become Heroes"	The Streets	4:00
16.	"Starry Eyed Surprise"	Paul Oakenfold	3:47
17.	"Two Months Off"	Underworld	3:57
18.	"The Theme"	Jurgen Vries	3:09
19.	"Try"	Ian Van Dahl	3:46
20.	"Forever"	N-Trance	3:11
21.	"Just the Way You Are"	Milky	3:30

Disc two

No.	Title	Artist	Length
1.	"Crossroads"	Blazin' Squad	3:12
2.	"Little by Little"	Oasis	4:57
3.	"Strange and Beautiful (I'll Put a Spell on You)"	Aqualung	3:50
4.	"Papa Don't Preach"	Kelly Osbourne	3:27
5.	"Adrienne"	The Calling	4:01
6.	"Formulae"	JJ72	3:02
7.	"Positivity"	Suede	2:56
8.	"Do You Realize??"	The Flaming Lips	3:33
9.	"Life Goes On"	LeAnn Rimes	3:37
10.	"Beauty on the Fire"	Natalie Imbruglia	4:21
11.	"Why'd You Lie to Me"	Anastacia	3:46
12.	"Half a Heart"	H & Claire	3:27
13.	"I'm Alive"	Celine Dion	3:30
14.	"Strange Relationship"	Darren Hayes	4:01
15.	"Put Your Arms Around Me"	Natural	3:12
16.	"Time of My Life"	Toploader	3:35
17.	"Word Love"	Rhianna	3:43
18.	"Way Beyond"	Morcheeba	3:12
19.	"Mistiblue"	Amillionsons	3:45
