= New Hits 99 =

Compilation album by Various artists
- Released: 3 April 1999
- Genre: Pop
- Label: Sony Music, warner.esp, Global TV

Various artists chronology
Hits 99 (1998)	New Hits 99 (1999)	Fresh Hits 99 (1999)

New Hits 99 is a compilation album released in 1999. As a part of the Hits compilation series, it contains UK hit singles from the last few months of 1998 and the first few months of 1999. The album reached number 1 on the UK compilations chart for one week.

== Track listing ==
=== Disc one ===
1. B*Witched – "Blame It on the Weatherman"
2. Blondie – "Maria"
3. Steps – "Better Best Forgotten"
4. Another Level – "I Want You for Myself"
5. Cher – "Strong Enough"
6. TQ – "Westside"
7. NSYNC – "I Want You Back"
8. Robbie Williams – "No Regrets"
9. Boyzone – "No Matter What"
10. Five – "It's the Things You Do"
11. Fatboy Slim – "Praise You"
12. Mr. Oizo – "Flat Beat"
13. Shanks & Bigfoot – "Sweet like Chocolate""
14. M People – "Dreaming"
15. Savage Garden – "I Want You"
16. Faith Hill – "This Kiss"
17. Ace of Base – "Always Have, Always Will"

=== Disc two ===
1. The Corrs – "Runaway" (Tin Tin Out remix edit)
2. Barenaked Ladies – "One Week"
3. Manic Street Preachers – "You Stole the Sun from My Heart"
4. The Divine Comedy – "National Express"
5. Stereophonics – "Just Looking"
6. Garbage – "When I Grow Up"
7. Underworld – "Push Upstairs"
8. Kula Shaker – "Mystical Machine Gun"
9. Supercar – "Tonite"
10. Mirrorball – "Given Up"
11. Cevin Fisher featuring Loleatta Holloway – "(You Got Me) Burning Up"
12. Soulsearcher – "Can't Get Enough"
13. Inner City – "Good Life (Buena Vida)"
14. Will Smith featuring Larry Blackmon and Cameo – "Candy"
15. Busta Rhymes – "Gimme Some More"
16. Pras – "Blue Angels"
17. Ginuwine – "What's So Different?"
18. Kleshay – "Rush"
19. Cleopatra – "A Touch of Love"
20. Ultra – "Rescue Me"
21. Johnny & Denise – "Especially for You"
