= Hitz Blitz =

Compilation album by various artists
- Released: August 1, 1995
- Label: Global TV

Various artists chronology
The Ultimate Hits Album (1994)	Hitz Blitz (1995)	Hits 96 (1995)

Hitz Blitz is a compilation album released in August 1995. It is part of the Hits compilation series which began in 1984.

Hitz Blitz is a single CD compilation from BMG, released under their compilations arm Global Television. BMG were one of the partners of the original Hits series, and carried on the series after CBS Records and WEA retired from the brand.

The album went to number 2 in the UK Compilations Chart, but the success of the series saw Global Television revive the Hits series full-time with the release of Hits 96 at the end of 1995, with Sony Music and Warner Music rejoining the series soon afterwards.

Number ones included: Take That - "Never Forget" and Robson & Jerome - "Unchained Melody"

== Track listing ==
1. Take That - "Never Forget"
2. M People - "Search for the Hero"
3. Edwyn Collins - "A Girl Like You"
4. Annie Lennox - "A Whiter Shade of Pale"
5. The Outhere Brothers - "Boom Boom Boom"
6. West End - "Love Rules"
7. PJ & Duncan - "Stuck On U"
8. Kylie Minogue - "Where Is the Feeling?"
9. Kenny "Dope" presents Bucketheads - "The Bomb! (These Sounds Fall into My Mind)"
10. Corona - "Try Me Out"
11. Nightcrawlers - "Surrender Your Love"
12. D:Ream - "Shoot Me with Your Love"
13. Jinny - "Keep Warm"
14. Jam & Spoon - "Right in the Night (Fall in Love With Music)"
15. Mozaic - "Sing It (The Hallelujah Song)"
16. Bobby Brown - "Humpin' Around"
17. Jodeci - "Freek'n You"
18. Billie Ray Martin - "Your Loving Arms"
19. Clock - "Whoomph! (There It Is)"
20. Michelle Gayle - "Freedom"
21. Zig and Zag featuring Rednex - "Hands Up, Hands Up"
22. Robson & Jerome - "Unchained Melody"
