= Huge Hits 99 =

Compilation album by Various artists
- Released: 25 October 1999
- Recorded: 1998–99
- Label: Sony Music, warner.esp, Global TV

Various artists chronology
| Big Hits 99 (1999) | Huge Hits 99 (1999) | Hits 2000 (1999) |

Huge Hits 99 is a compilation album released in 1999. As a part of the Hits compilation series, it contains UK hit singles from the third quarter of 1999.

== Track listing ==
=== Disc one ===
1. Eiffel 65 - "Blue (Da Ba Dee)"
2. George Michael - "Outside"
3. Lou Bega - "Mambo No. 5"
4. Ricky Martin - "Livin' la Vida Loca"
5. Britney Spears - "Sometimes"
6. S Club 7 - "Bring It All Back"
7. Westlife - "Swear It Again"
8. Five - "If Ya Gettin' Down"
9. Backstreet Boys - "I Want It That Way"
10. Steps - "Love's Got a Hold on My Heart"
11. Boyzone - "You Needed Me"
12. Jamiroquai - "Canned Heat"
13. B*Witched - "Blame It on the Weatherman"
14. a1 - "Be the First to Believe"
15. NSYNC - "I Want You Back"
16. Sixpence None the Richer - "Kiss Me"
17. The Corrs - "Runaway"
18. New Radicals - "You Get What You Give"
19. Catatonia - "Dead from the Waist Down"
20. Manic Street Preachers - "You Stole the Sun from My Heart"
21. Tom Jones & the Cardigans - "Burning Down The House"

=== Disc two ===
1. Whitney Houston - "My Love Is Your Love"
2. Jennifer Lopez - "If You Had My Love"
3. Shanks & Bigfoot - "Sweet like Chocolate"
4. Will Smith - "Miami"
5. ATB - "9 PM (Till I Come)"
6. Ann Lee - "2 Times"
7. Armand van Helden featuring Duane Harden - "You Don't Know Me"
8. Bob Marley vs. Funkstar De Luxe - "Sun Is Shining (Radio De Luxe edit)"
9. The Wiseguys - "Ooh La La"
10. Phats & Small - "Turn Around"
11. Fatboy Slim - "Praise You"
12. A.T.F.C. Presents Onephatdeeva - "In and Out of My Life"
13. Another Level - "I Want You For Myself"
14. Destiny's Child - "Bills, Bills, Bills"
15. TQ - "Westside"
16. Lauryn Hill - "Ex-Factor"
17. Glamma Kid featuring Shola Ama - "Taboo"
18. Tatyana Ali - "Boy You Knock Me Out"
19. Barenaked Ladies - "One Week"
20. Thunderbugs - "Friends Forever"
21. Steps, Cleopatra, Tina Cousins, B*Witched and Billie - "Thank ABBA For The Music":
  1. "Take a Chance on Me"
  2. "Dancing Queen"
  3. "Mamma Mia"
  4. "Thank You For The Music"
