= Snap It Up! Monster Hits 2 =

Compilation album by Various Artists
- Released: 30 July 1990
- Label: CBS/WEA/BMG

The Hits Albums chronology
Monster Hits (1989)	Snap It Up! Monster Hits 2 (1990)	The Hit Pack (1990)

Snap It Up! Monster Hits 2 (also known as Hits 12), is a compilation album forming part of the Hits compilation series. It is the 12th volume in the long-running series. The double album was released in August 1990 and was the follow-up to Monster Hits, released the previous year.

The album reached #2 in the UK Top 20 Compilations Chart and was the second Hits album not to achieve a BPI Platinum award, after 1988's Hits Album. Furthermore, after two volumes, the Monster Hits title was dropped, and the next Hits compilation contained a new title and format.

Snap It Up! features one song which reached number one on the UK Singles Chart: "World in Motion".

== Track listing ==
Catalogue Number: CDHITS12

CD/Record/Tape 1

1. Yazz - "Treat Me Good"
2. Lisa Stansfield - "What Did I Do to You?"
3. The Chimes - "I Still Haven't Found What I'm Looking For"
4. Diana Ross - "I'm Still Waiting (Phil Chill 1990 Remix)"
5. En Vogue - "Hold On"
6. Bobby Brown - "The Freestyle Mega-Mix" (including "On Our Own", "Don't Be Cruel, "Every Little Step", "My Prerogative")
7. The Beloved - "Hello"
8. The Family Stand - "Ghetto Heaven (Remix)"
9. Alannah Myles - "Black Velvet"
10. The B-52's - "Love Shack"
11. Craig McLachlan and Check 1-2 - "Mona (I Need You Baby)"
12. They Might Be Giants - "Birdhouse in Your Soul"
13. Aztec Camera - "The Crying Scene"
14. An Emotional Fish - "Celebrate"
15. Rod Stewart - "Downtown Train"
16. Eurythmics - "Angel"

CD/Record/Tape 2

1. David A. Stewart and Candy Dulfer - "Lily Was Here"
2. Gloria Estefan - "Here We Are"
3. Paul Young - "Softly Whispering I Love You"
4. Halo James - "Could Have Told You So"
5. The Pasadenas - "Love Thing"
6. Sonia and Big Fun - "You've Got a Friend"
7. Erasure - "Star"
8. Pop Will Eat Itself - "Touched by the Hand of Cicciolina"
9. Black Box - "Everybody Everybody"
10. England/New Order - "World in Motion"
11. Guru Josh - "Infinity"
12. Betty Boo - "Doin' the Do"
13. Don Pablo's Animals - "Venus (The Piano Mix)"
14. Snap! - "Ooops Up"
15. Chad Jackson - "Hear the Drummer (Get Wicked)"
16. MC Tunes vs. 808 State - "The Only Rhyme That Bites"
