= Hits 99 =

Compilation album by various artists
- Released: 19 December 1998
- Recorded: 1998
- Genre: Pop
- Label: Sony Music, warner.esp, Global TV

Various artists chronology
Huge Hits 1998 (1998)	Hits 99 (1998)	New Hits 99 (1999)

Hits 99 is a compilation album released in 1998. As a part of the Hits compilation series, it contains UK hit singles from the second half of 1998. The album reached number 2 on the UK compilations chart.

== Track listing ==
=== Disc one ===
1. Cher - "Believe"
2. B*Witched - "Rollercoaster"
3. Five - "Until the Time Is Through"
4. Steps - "Heartbeat"
5. Will Smith - "Miami"
6. Another Level - "Guess I Was a Fool"
7. The Tamperer featuring Maya - "If You Buy This Record (Your Life Will Be Better)"
8. Touch and Go - "Would You?"
9. Spacedust - "Gym and Tonic"
10. Jay-Z - "Hard Knock Life"
11. Fatboy Slim - "Build It Up - Tear It Down" (mistitled on some releases as "Gangster Trippin'")
12. Sash! - "Mysterious Times"
13. Billie - "Because We Want To"
14. T-Spoon - "Tom's Party"
15. Sham Rock - "Tell Me Ma"
16. Aqua - "My Oh My"
17. 4 the Cause - "Stand By Me"
18. Lutricia McNeal - "Somebody Loves You Honey"
19. Boyzone - "All That I Need"
20. All Saints - "War of Nerves ('98 Remix)"

=== Disc two ===
1. The Corrs - "So Young"
2. Manic Street Preachers - "The Everlasting"
3. Space - "We've Gotta Get Out Of This Place"
4. Stereophonics - "The Bartender and the Thief"
5. Republica - "From Rush Hour With Love"
6. Catatonia - "Game On"
7. Natalie Imbruglia - "Smoke"
8. Jennifer Paige - "Crush"
9. M People - "Testify"
10. Monica - "The First Night"
11. Tatyana Ali - "Daydreamin'"
12. Jungle Brothers - "Because I Got It Like That '98"
13. Meja - "All 'Bout the Money"
14. Tina Cousins - "Pray"
15. Matthew Marsden featuring Destiny's Child - "She's Gone"
16. Sparkle - "Time To Move On"
17. Des'ree - "What's Your Sign?"
18. LeAnn Rimes - "Blue"
19. Sarah McLachlan - "Adia"
20. Alberta - "Yo-Yo Boy"
