= New Hits 96 =

Compilation album by Various artists
- Released: 12 May 1996
- Label: Sony Music, Warner Music Group, Global TV

Various artists chronology
Hits 96 (1995)	New Hits 96 (1996)	Fresh Hits 96 (1996)

New Hits 96 is a compilation album released in 1996. As a part of the Hits compilation series, it contains UK hit singles from the winter and early spring months of 1996. The album reached number 1 on the UK compilations chart and stayed there for nine weeks.

New Hits 96 contains five songs that reached number one on the UK Singles Chart: "How Deep Is Your Love", "Return of the Mack", "Firestarter", "Up on the Roof" and "Don't Look Back in Anger".

The B-side to "Don't Look Back in Anger", Oasis' cover of Slade's "Cum On Feel the Noize", also features on the album.

== Track listing ==
=== Disc one ===
1. Take That – "How Deep Is Your Love"
2. Mark Morrison – "Return of the Mack"
3. 3T – "Anything"
4. Chantay Savage – "I Will Survive"
5. Robert Miles – "Children (Eat Me Edit)"
6. The Prodigy – "Firestarter (Edit)"
7. David Bowie & The Pet Shop Boys – "Hallo Spaceboy (Remix)"
8. Gina G – "Ooh Aah... Just a Little Bit (Eurovision Song Contest Version)"
9. Suggs – "Cecilia (Speeded Up Version)"
10. PJ & Duncan – "Stepping Stone"
11. Celine Dion – "Falling into You"
12. TLC – "Creep"
13. Coolio – "1, 2, 3, 4 Sumpin' New (Timber Mix)"
14. Cher – "One by One (LP Version)"
15. Annie Lennox feat. Paul Simon – "Something So Right"
16. M People – "Search for the Hero (M People Radio Mix)"
17. Everything but the Girl – "Missing (Todd Terry Club Mix) (Blanco/Eternal Radio Edit)"
18. The Lightning Seeds – "Ready or Not"
19. Etta James – "I Just Want to Make Love to You"
20. Robson & Jerome – "Up on the Roof"

=== Disc two ===
1. Oasis – "Don't Look Back in Anger"
2. Garbage – "Stupid Girl"
3. Ash – "Goldfinger"
4. Skunk Anansie – "Charity"
5. Lush – "Ladykillers"
6. The Wannadies – "You and Me Song"
7. Ocean Colour Scene – "The Riverboat Song"
8. The Presidents of the United States of America – "Lump"
9. Dog Eat Dog – "No Fronts (Jam Master Jay's Main Edit)"
10. Oasis – "Cum On Feel the Noize"
11. Goldbug – "Whole Lotta Love (Radio Version)"
12. Gat Decor – "Passion (Do You Want It Right Now Edit)"
13. Sasha & Maria – "Be As One"
14. Meltdown – "My Life Is In Your Hands"
15. Harmonix – "Landslide (Original Mix)"
16. Nightcrawlers – "Should I Ever (Fall in Love)"
17. Republica – "Ready To Go"
18. Molella feat. The Outhere Brothers – "If You Wanna Party (Original Mix) (Eternal Radio Edit)"
19. Technohead – "I Wanna Be A Hippy (Flamman & Abraxas Radio Edit)"
20. The Manchester United (1996) FA Cup Squad – "Move Move Move (The Red Tribe)"
