= Hits 50 =

Compilation album by Various Artists
- Released: August 13, 2001
- Label: Sony Music Entertainment UK/WEA/RCA Ariola/BMG/Telstar

Various Artists chronology
Music 2: The Definitive Hits Collection (2001)	Hits 50 (2001)	Hits 51 (2001)

Hits 50 is a compilation album released in the United Kingdom in August 2001. It contains 50 tracks spread over two CDs, including ten number-one singles on the UK Singles Chart from Five, DJ Pied Piper and the Masters of Ceremonies, Craig David, Jennifer Lopez, Bob the Builder, Rui Da Silva, The Bangles, LeAnn Rimes, A1, and Westlife.

Hits 50 is the first Hits album since Hits 97 and Hits 99 to feature the word Hits in the name as the only word in the title.

== Controversy and background ==
Despite its success, the album was quite controversial - in order to have 25 tracks on a single disc, many of the tracks had to be edited down, although this is not mentioned on the artwork. Despite this, controversy eventually died down and Hits 51 followed this format for 25 tracks on one disc, with tracks now played in full. The album was released 3 months before Now That's What I Call Music!'s 50th volume, Now 50.

Hits 50 came through after the previous volume's (Music 2 - Summer 2001) was considered somewhat of a commercial failure by BMG UK, so they decided to rebrand the Hits series to its numbering system (there had not been a Hits album with a volume number suffix since 1991).

== Track listing ==
Disc one

No.	Title	Artist	Length
1.	"Let's Dance"	Five	3:09
2.	"Little L" (Wounded Buffalo Mix)	Jamiroquai	3:11
3.	"Heaven Is a Halfpipe"	OPM	3:12
4.	"TwentyFourSeven"	Artful Dodger featuring Melanie Blatt	3:10
5.	"All I Want"	Mis-Teeq	3:11
6.	"Perfect Gentleman"	Wyclef Jean	3:18
7.	"Bootylicious"	Destiny's Child	3:01
8.	"Do You Really Like It?"	DJ Pied Piper and the Masters of Ceremonies	3:08
9.	"Electric Avenue" (Ringbang Remix)	Eddy Grant	3:10
10.	"7 Days"	Craig David	3:01
11.	"Ms. Jackson"	Outkast	3:16
12.	"Most Girls"	Pink	2:50
13.	"Shackles (Praise You)"	Mary Mary	3:11
14.	"Another Lover"	Dane Bowers	3:10
15.	"Where I Wanna Be"	Shade Sheist featuring Nate Dogg and Kurupt	3:20
16.	"Karma Hotel"	The Spooks	2:49
17.	"Too Close"	Next	3:18
18.	"Love Don't Cost a Thing"	Jennifer Lopez	3:12
19.	"Freestyler"	Bomfunk MC's	2:53
20.	"Love You Anyway"	De Nada	3:10
21.	"Baddest Ruffest"	Backyard Dog	3:45
22.	"Devil's Nightmare"	Oxide & Neutrino	3:19
23.	"Mambo No. 5"	Lou Bega	3:15
24.	"Help! I'm a Fish (Little Yellow Fish)"	Little Trees	3:10
25.	"You're My Mate"	Right Said Fred	3:03

Disc two

No.	Title	Artist	Length
1.	"Starlight"	The Supermen Lovers	2:57
2.	"Ya Mama"	Fatboy Slim	3:14
3.	"Castles in the Sky"	Ian Van Dahl	3:11
4.	"We Come 1"	Faithless	3:15
5.	"Hide U"	Kosheen	3:19
6.	"Touch Me"	Rui da Silva featuring Cassandra	3:22
7.	"Precious Heart"	Tall Paul vs. INXS	2:57
8.	"The Real Life"	Raven Maize	2:56
9.	"I Feel Loved"	Depeche Mode	3:08
10.	"Crystal"	New Order	3:15
11.	"Have a Nice Day"	Stereophonics	3:16
12.	"Eternal Flame"	The Bangles	3:15
13.	"Can't Fight the Moonlight" (Latino Mix)	LeAnn Rimes	3:15
14.	"A Little Respect"	Wheatus	3:10
15.	"Babylon"	David Gray	3:28
16.	"Made for Lovin' You"	Anastacia	3:13
17.	"Boss of Me"	They Might Be Giants	2:57
18.	"Ocean Spray"	Manic Street Preachers	3:04
19.	"Dancing in the Moonlight"	Toploader	3:14
20.	"She Bangs"	Ricky Martin	3:01
21.	"Back Here"	BBMak	3:18
22.	"Bodyrock"	Tymes 4	3:18
23.	"Same Old Brand New You"	A1	2:52
24.	"All or Nothing"	O-Town	3:19
25.	"Uptown Girl"	Westlife	3:07
