= Hits 93 Volume 2 =

Compilation album by various artists
- Released: 17 May 1993
- Recorded: Various
- Label: Telstar Records/BMG

The Hits Albums chronology
Hits 93 Volume 1 (1993)	Hits 93 Volume 2 (1993)	Hits 93 Volume 3 (1993)

Hits 93 Volume 2 is a compilation album released by Telstar Records and BMG in Spring 1993. It was the second in a series of four albums collecting the biggest hits of the year, much like the original series called The Hits Album which ran from 1984 to 1991, although Hits 93 was formatted as a single-CD/MC collection.

The track listing contains mostly dance chart hits, and two tracks were included in an alternative mix to the standard radio edit ('I'm Every Woman' by Whitney Houston was the Club/House extended mix and the version of 'I'm So Into You' by SWV was the Teddy Riley Remix). The collection reached #2 in the UK Top 20 Compilation chart and achieved a Gold BPI Award.

== Track listing ==
1. 2 Unlimited – "Tribal Dance"
2. Whitney Houston – "I'm Every Woman (Every Woman's House/Club Mix)"
3. SWV – "I'm So into You (Allstar's Drop Radio Edit)*" (incorrectly labelled, should have read 'Teddy Riley Remix')
4. Lionrock – "Packet of Peace"
5. Jade – "Don't Walk Away"
6. Annie Lennox – "Little Bird"
7. Snow – "Informer (Edit)"
8. Shabba Ranks featuring Chevelle Franklyn – "Mr. Loverman"
9. The Prodigy – "Wind It Up (Rewound)"
10. Sub Sub featuring Melanie Williams – "Ain't No Love (Ain't No Use)"
11. Q featuring Tracy Ackerman – "Get Here"
12. Take That – "Why Can't I Wake Up with You"
13. Sybil – "When I'm Good and Ready"
14. Sonia – "Better the Devil You Know"
15. Serious Rope presents Sharon D. Clarke – "Happiness (Medley)"
16. Robin S. – "Show Me Love"
17. Shaggy – "Oh Carolina"
18. Dr. Alban – "Sing Hallelujah"
19. Barry Manilow – "Copacabana" (1993 Remix)
20. The Lemonheads – "It's a Shame about Ray"
