= Hits 94 Volume 1 =

Compilation album by various artists
- Released: 7 March 1994
- Recorded: Various
- Label: Telstar Records/BMG

The Hits Albums chronology
Hits 93 Volume 4 (1993)	Hits 94 Volume 1 (1994)	The Ultimate Hits Album (1994)

Hits 94 Volume 1 was the first and only compilation in the Hits 94 series. In 1993, there were 4 volumes of the Hits series, however, the series was discontinued after this release. The album was released on LP, CD and Cassette by Telstar Records and BMG, and it charted at #2 in March 1994.

Like Hits 93 Volume 3, Hits 94 Volume 1 contains 22 tracks, a few of which are edited, some very crudely, in order to fit them all onto an 80-minute cd.

The Hits series then went on temporary hiatus until November 1994, when BMG and Telstar joined forces again for The Ultimate Hits Album.

Number ones included: Things Can Only Get Better, Two Tribes, Babe (Return Remix) and Without You.

== Track listing ==
CDHITS 941

1. "Things Can Only Get Better" – D:Ream
2. "A Deeper Love" – Aretha Franklin
3. "Come Baby Come" – K7
4. "Don't Look Any Further (M-People Master Mix)" – M People
5. "The Way You Work It (7" Radio Edit)" – E.Y.C.
6. "Big Time Sensuality" – Björk
7. "Let the Beat Control Your Body" – 2 Unlimited
8. "I Miss You (Radio Mix)" – Haddaway
9. "Uptight" – Shara Nelson
10. "Stay Together" – Suede
11. "Cornflake Girl (UK Radio Mix)" – Tori Amos
12. "Bat Out of Hell (Radio Edit)" – Meat Loaf
13. "Two Tribes" – Frankie Goes to Hollywood
14. "Babe (Return Remix)" – Take That
15. "Downtown (Sweet Radio Mix)" – SWV
16. "Little Bit of Heaven" – Lisa Stansfield
17. "Forever Now (Radio Edit)" – Level 42
18. "Here I Stand" – Bitty McLean
19. "There But for the Grace of God" – Fire Island featuring Love Nelson
20. "Right in the Night (Fall in Love With Music)" (Radio Edit) – Jam & Spoon
21. "Without You" – Harry Nilsson
22. "Something in Common (Radio Edit)" – Bobby Brown and Whitney Houston
