= Hits (compilation series) =

Contemporary music compilation series

The first volume of the original Hits series.

Hits - also commonly known as The Hits Album - is a long-running compilation album series containing contemporary chart music. It originally ran in the United Kingdom and parts of Europe for over twenty years from 1984 until 2006. It was compiled as a joint venture, variously between the compilation arms of the Sony Music, RCA/BMG, and Warner Music groups to rival the Now That's What I Call Music series that had launched a year earlier in 1983, compiled by rival companies EMI and Virgin. Initially, the Hits brand was arguably as popular as its main rival and all of the first eight volumes achieved at least a platinum BPI award, with several of the very early albums going multi-platinum.

During 1989, five years into the Hits series' run, a drop in sales resulted in several re-brands meaning that for a period of time, the series lost momentum with the release pattern and the numbering of each volume.

The series was briefly retired, and in 1992, there were not any Hits compilations released. The following year, BMG partnered with compilation specialist company Telstar Records for a brief run of five volumes of the Hits 93 and Hits 94 single-CD/MC/LP compilations.

In December 1995, BMG and Warner Music partnered for a new series of Hits albums, and Hits 96 was the first compilation containing the relaunched brand. This proved very successful, and once again the Hits series started to rival the success of the contemporaneous Now releases of the time. Unlike the earlier Hits output of two issues a year, there was a notable increase of up to five compilations, and instead of a volume or issue number, they all have varied titles: Hits, New Hits, Fresh Hits, Big Hits and Huge Hits – this title is then always followed by the year of release; for example, Fresh Hits 1997.

In December 2000, Hits 2001 was released, and this indicated that in 2001, there would be a continuation of the standard release pattern of New, Fresh, Big, and Huge Hits. However, the compilers decided to rename Hits to "Music: The Definitive Hits Collection", and the new series was billed to contain a much broader range of chart hits designed to appeal to buyers of the hugely successful and long-running Now That's What I Call Music series.

Finally, after two volumes of Music in 2001, the end of the year saw "Hits 50" released, and this was a return to the original numbering format the Hits series had long abandoned in 1989. This lasted for eleven volumes and continued to Hits 60 in 2004, after which, there was a return to having random Hits titles and sporadic release dates again. By 2006, almost twenty two years after the first Hits Album was released, the tired brand could not compete with the evergreen Now series. Seen as no longer profitable or relevant, the last Hits album was called Summer Hits 2006 and this left the Now That's What I Call Music series as the only hits compilation brand still going strong on the UK Compilation Album chart as of October 2026.

The Hits Album was also a well received compilation series in the rest of Europe, and there are several European variants.

In 2014, Warner Music released the one-off download compilation Top Hits, which could be considered a revival of the series, and since April 2019, Sony Music has released budget compilations under The Hits Album name in partnership with Universal Music under their UMC (Universal Music Catalogue)/Universal Music Recordings label.

== Hits 1 to The Hits Album ==
Original series 1984–1991

The original series of The Hits Album began in November 1984 and fourteen volumes of Hits Album were released between November 1984 and June 1991. The early albums contained 32 tracks, as opposed to 30 usually found on the Now compilations and reached either number 1 or number 2 on the UK Top 100 Album Chart. All of the albums from this period achieved at least a platinum BPI award, with the exception of the ninth volume.

When the Hits Album series began, it was a joint venture by CBS and WEA; RCA Ariola (later BMG) joined the partnership in 1986, and it would be a combination of these three companies, and later, Telstar TV, that would release The Hits Album for the rest of its long run. The LP and CD (from 1986) variations were called "The Hits Album (Volume number)" whilst the cassette tapes were often called "The Hits Tape (volume number)"

Like the Now series, The Hits Album collections brought together big hits from the partnering record companies and was seen as the music collectors' companion to the equally popular Now releases. The Hits Album often featured songs by artists such as Madonna, Prince, Bruce Springsteen, Michael Jackson, Fleetwood Mac, Cher, Whitney Houston, Spandau Ballet and other successful international acts that did not generally appear on the rival Now compilations, as well as exclusives from popular UK artists of the time, such as Wham! and George Michael, Paul Young and Alison Moyet. The first Hits Album managed to keep the rival Now album (Now 4) from the number 1 position in December 1984 (the only Now album never to reach number 1) and it spent a total of 7 weeks at the top of the UK Top 100 Album chart.

In 1986, Hits 5 was the first album of the series to be released on a single CD, with The Hits Album 7 being the first to be released as a double-CD the following year. A video compilation was often released at the same time as the albums, but not always. Like the Now compilations, the artwork for The Hits Album was equally eye catching and glossy, often including three dimensional numbers and shapes. The whole Hits package included background information about the artists and tracks, often including chart positions and an album credit. This appeared in the inner gatefold of the standard album, and in a small booklet with the cassette and CD, although a few of the later editions did not include this feature.

The Hits Album plus an issue number was released through to June 1989 and stopped at The Hits Album 10, although the ninth volume had previously been released in December 1988 as simply The Hits Album. Subsequent releases through to 1991 were released without an issue number and this successive refreshing of the Hits brand could be seen as minor relaunches of the series, each time in the face of the continuing success and strength of the rival Now brand.

From November 1989, the albums in the Hits series started using alternative titles such as Monster Hits and The Hit Pack. They are however considered an extension of the original series as these albums were all issued by BMG, CBS and WEA. and also contained the word Hit somewhere in the title. From November 1989 to July 1991, The Hits Albums were released with these titles:

- Monster Hits

(CBS/BMG/WEA. CDHITS 11. November 1989)

- Snap It Up! Monster Hits 2

(CBS/BMG/WEA. CDHITS 12. August 1990)

Both Monster Hits and Snap it Up! Monster Hits 2 featured a cartoon gimmick, "The Hits Monster", in the artwork and advertising campaign, in a similar way a cartoon pig was used during earlier Now That's What I Call Music releases.

- The Hit Pack

(CBS/BMG/WEA. COMP CD1. December 1990)

When the Monster Hits theme ended after only two volumes, The Hit Pack was released with much more restrained artwork and advertising. It is unique because it was not released on LP and only issued on cassette with 24 tracks, and as a 21 track single-CD.

- The Hits Album

(Sony Music/BMG/Cookie Jar TV. HITS CD 15. June 1991)

The series went full circle and became simply The Hits Album again, although this release was listed as The Hits Album 15 in some chart statistic publications due to the catalogue number 'HITSCD15'. This album was also a joint venture with Cookie Jar Records, a division of Polygram Records specialising in TV marketed compilations.

Although The Hits Album in 1991 was a success, the series was retired that year.

== Hits 93 and Hits 94 ==
Telstar series 1993 to 1994

With the Hits brand retired, Telstar Records launched the Hits '93 compilation series in association with its parent distribution company BMG, who originally joined the Hits series with WEA and CBS in 1986. Unlike the albums put out by the respective Sony BMG and Warner labels of the era, Hits '93 was formatted as a single-CD, MC and LP, and included a larger percentage of dance acts compared to the original Hits releases. Even though these albums could be seen as an extension of other Telstar Hit themed compilations (such as 100% Hits) these albums are categorized under the Hits brand in the Complete Book Of British Charts The Hits '93 series ran for four volumes during 1993, and one volume of Hits '94 with the concept eventually being replaced by the resurrection of Telstar and BMG's short-lived single-CD version of The Hits Album later in the year, which also lasted one volume.

When the Hits series developed a new era starting from 1995 through to 2001 (see below), BMG and Telstar went on to release Pure Hits 97 in 1997.

== Hits 96 Relaunch ==
Second series 1995 to 2000

In the summer of 1995, an album called Hitz Blitz was released by Global Television, and encouraged by its success, decided to relaunch The Hits Album as simply "Hits", and the first in the new series was released in December 1995 (with the BMG compilations arm trading as Global Television, and WSM being similarly labeled as warner.esp.tv). The relaunched series did not resume the original numbering system used until 1989; this was replaced in favour of different titles, for example, New Hits or Fresh Hits, and the year following the word 'Hits'. This was the most successful branding of the Hits series since the earlier volumes, and both Sony Music TV and compilation specialist company Telstar Records joined forces with BMG and Warner Music early in the series run. Originally, the albums were divided into four distinct parts: Part One contained the biggest hits; Part Two had all the big dance hits; Part Three featured indie and rock tracks and Part Four would generally hoover up any left over hits the compilers had access to. This theme ended in 1997. Unlike the earlier Hits albums (and all of the Now main series), the inlay booklets contained no pictures or trivia relating to the track; the only exception is New Hits 2000, which is uniquely the only compilation in this Hits era to include this feature, however, the cover artwork and design is very similar to the Now albums of the period. In 2000, there were two volumes of Fresh Hits and both featured a new cover design, but this rebrand was short-lived, and the series reverted to the established artwork and design for the final two volumes of this period; Huge Hits 2000 and Hits 2001.

Notably, New Hits 96 holds the distinction for the most consecutive weeks at number 1 in the UK Top 20 Compilation Chart since its launch on 14 January 1989. It spent 9 weeks at number 1 from 18 May 1996 to 13 July 1996. It shares this record with Now 29 which similarly held the position for 9 weeks.

There is not a compilation entitled Hits 98. This is due to the compilers adding the Big Hits name to the series in December 1997. The next Big Hits was issued in September 1998, therefore, a Hits 99 followed in December, as per the release pattern established in 1995.

Titles in this Hits series

The earlier volumes of The Hits Album were generally released twice a year but this Hits series saw a noticeable increase to four, and then five, compilations a year:

- Hits

This was the first in the relaunched series by Global Television and Warner Bros, then trading as WMTV, and was released in December 1995. Simply 'Hits' and the following year would then be released in December, beginning that year's series of collections.

- New Hits

Compilations with this title were always released in March/April; the first album was New Hits 96.

- Fresh Hits

Sony Music TV rejoined the Hits venture when this album was released in 1996; Fresh Hits were always released in July.

- Big Hits

Additional title, added to the series in December 1997, with the next released in September 1998 and August 1999.

- Huge Hits

Year-end Hits collections were always preceded with Huge and were always released in early November.

== Hits: The Modern Years ==
2001 to 2006

In March 2001, and following the traditional Hits 2001 release in December 2000, another relaunch occurred, and this was reported in Music Week to be an attempt to appeal to the broader range of Now That's What I Call Music buyers. Sony BMG, Warner Strategic Marketing, and now with Telstar TV on board, rebranded the well-established Hits series to "Music". "Music: The Definitive Hits Collection" was launched in March, and "Music: Today's Definitive Hits Collection Volume 2" was released four months later, with both volumes issued in a glossy cardboard slipcase with slick minimalistic artwork. After this, the Hits series returned to the volume numbering format as Hits 50 in late September 2001, and Hits 51 swiftly followed in December.

This relaunch saw heavy promotional emphasis on the fact that both Hits 50 and Hits 51 included 50 tracks, with 25 tracks on each disc. However, each song's running time was reduced to fit 25 tracks on a single disc, and it charted only at #10. Hits 52 featured 40 tracks which were not edited. Hits 52 contained a music video as a bonus feature for computer users. The final volume to feature a music video was Hits 54.

By 2004, Hits 60 was released and this had three discs with sixty tracks. Red Hot Hits was the next release, Essential Hits came in 2005, followed by Summer Hits 2006.

2014 to present (2020) In April 2019, Sony Music released three budget compilations under The Hits Album name in partnership with Universal Music under their UMC (Universal Music Catalogue) label, later as Universal Music Recordings. More compilations followed in this series.

== Christmas Hits ==
Hits albums themed to Christmas music had begun in 2001. The releases all had the same name, but with different subtitles, and were:

- Christmas Hits (50 Festive Favourites) (2001): An album that had 50 tracks over 2 discs (being one in four Hits albums to do so). Re-released in 2002 and 2003. Once again, as with the regular Hits series, some tracks had to be edited for the ability to use 25 tracks on each disc.
- Christmas Hits (60 Festive Favourites) (2004): Contains 60 tracks over 3 discs. Re-released in 2005 and 2006.
- Christmas Hits (80 Festive Favourites) (2007): Contains 80 tracks over 4 discs, with the fourth disc being an exclusive studio album containing new recordings of carols. The digital version is titled Christmas Hits (Digital Edition). Re-released in 2008 and 2009.

== Complete chronology ==
Date Charted	Title	Record company	Chart position (duration / weeks)	Format
1984-12-01	The Hits Album	CBS / WEA	#1 (7)	Double LP / MC
1985-04-13	The Hits Album 2	CBS / WEA	#1 (6)	Double LP / MC
1985-12-07	The Hits Album 3	CBS / WEA	#2	Double LP / MC
1986-03-29	Hits 4	CBS / RCA-Ariola / WEA	#1 (4)	Double LP / MC
1986-11-22	Hits 5	CBS / RCA-Ariola / WEA	#1 (2)	Double LP / MC; Single CD
1987-07-22	The Hits Album 6	CBS / BMG / WEA	#1 (5)	Double LP / MC; Single CD
1987-12-05	The Hits Album 7	CBS / BMG / WEA	#2	Double LP / MC / CD
1988-07-30	The Hits Album 8	CBS / BMG / WEA	#2	Double LP / MC / CD
1988-12-17	The Hits Album	CBS / BMG / WEA	#5 (album) #4 (compilation)	Double LP / MC / CD
1989-06-03	The Hits Album 10	CBS / BMG / WEA	#1 (6)	Double LP / MC / CD
1989-12-02	Monster Hits	CBS / BMG / WEA	#2	Double LP / MC / CD
1990-08-11	Snap It Up! Monster Hits 2	CBS / BMG / WEA	#2	Double LP / MC / CD
1990-12-29	The Hit Pack	CBS / BMG / WEA	#2	Single MC / Single CD
1991-08-10	The Hits Album	BMG / Sony	#1 (2)	Double LP / MC / CD
1993-02-20	Hits 93 Volume One	BMG / Telstar	#1 (3)	Single LP / MC / CD
1993-05-29	Hits 93 Volume Two	BMG / Telstar	#2	Single LP / MC / CD
1993-08-14	Hits 93 Volume Three	BMG / Telstar	#2	Single LP / MC / CD
1993-11-20	Hits 93 Volume Four	BMG / Telstar	#2	Single LP / MC / CD
1994-03-19	Hits 94 Volume One	BMG / Telstar	#3	Single LP / MC / CD
1994-10-15	The Ultimate Hits Album	BMG / Telstar	#11	Single LP / MC / CD
1995-08-01	Hitz Blitz	Global	#2	Single CD
1995-12-23	Hits 96	Global / Warner	#1 (5)	Double CD
1996-05-18	New Hits 96	Global / Sony / Warner	#1 (9)	Double MC / CD
1996-08-31	Fresh Hits 96	Global / Sony / Warner	#2	Double CD
1996-11-09	Huge Hits 1996	Global / Sony / Warner	#1 (2)	Double CD
1996-12-21	Hits 97	Global / Sony / Warner	#2	Double CD
1997-04-26	New Hits 1997	Global / Sony / Warner	#1 (4)	Double CD
1997-08-16	Fresh Hits 1997	Global / Sony / Warner	#1 (3)	Double CD
1997-11-01	Huge Hits 1997	Global / Sony / Warner	#1 (1)	Double MC / CD
1997-12-20	Big Hits	Global / Sony / Warner	#4	Double CD
1998-04-04	New Hits 98	Global / Sony / Warner	#1 (2)	Double MC / CD
1998-07-04	Fresh Hits 98	Global / Sony / Warner	#1 (6)	Double CD
1998-09-19	Big Hits 98	Global / Sony / Warner	#1 (5)	Double CD
1998-11-07	Huge Hits 1998	Global / Sony / Warner	#1 (2)	Double CD
1998-12-19	Hits 99	Global / Sony / Warner	#2	Double CD
1999-04-03	New Hits 99	Global / Sony / Warner	#1 (1)	Double CD
1999-07-03	Fresh Hits 99	Global / Sony / Warner	#1 (3)	Double MC / CD
1999-09-04	Big Hits 99	Global / Sony / Warner	#1 (2)	Double MC / CD
1999-11-06	Huge Hits 99	Global / Sony / Warner	#1 (4)	Double MC / CD
1999-12-18	Hits 2000	Global / Sony / Warner	#2	Double CD
2000-03-25	New Hits 2000	Global / Sony / Warner	#1 (2)	Double CD
2000-07-15	Fresh Hits Volume 1	Global / Sony / Warner	#2	Double CD
2000-09-16	Fresh Hits Volume 2	Global / Sony / Warner	#2	Double MC / CD
2000-11-04	Huge Hits 2000	Global / Sony / Warner	#2	Double MC / CD
2000-12-16	Hits 2001	BMG / Sony / Warner / Telstar	#2	Double CD
2001-03-31	Music: The Definitive Hits Collection Volume 1	BMG / Sony / Warner / Telstar	#4	Double CD
2001-06-23	Music: Today's Definitive Hits Collection Volume 2	BMG / Sony / Warner / Telstar	#7	Double CD
2001-09-29	Hits 50	BMG / Sony / WSM / Telstar	#2	Double MC / CD
2001-12-15	Hits 51	BMG / Sony / WSM / Telstar	#10	Double MC / CD
2002-04-06	Hits 52	BMG / Sony / WSM / Telstar	#2	Double MC / CD
2002-08-10	Hits 53	BMG / Sony / WSM / Telstar	#2	Double MC / CD
2002-11-02	Hits 54	BMG / Sony / WSM / Telstar	#1 (2)	Double MC / CD
2002-11-30	Huge Hits 2003	BMG / Sony / Telstar / WSM	#4	Double MC / CD
2003-04-12	Hits 55	BMG / Sony / Telstar / WSM	#1 (2)	Double MC / CD
2003-07-26	Hits 56	BMG / Sony / Telstar	#1 (1)	Double MC / CD
2003-11-01	Huge Hits 2004	BMG / Sony / Telstar / WSM	#3	Double MC / CD
2003-12-13	Hits 57	BMG / Sony / Telstar / WSM	#5	Double MC / CD
2004-06-12	Hits 58	BMG / Sony / WSM	#1 (1)	Double MC / CD
2004-10-02	Hits 59	BMG / Sony / WSM	#2	Double MC / CD
2004-11-27	Hits 60	BMG / Sony / WSM	#5	Triple CD
2005-03-21	Red Hot Hits	Sony BMG	#19	Double CD
2005-12-05	Essential Hits	Sony BMG / WSM	#24	Triple CD
2006-06-26	Summer Hits 2006	Sony BMG / WSM	#12	Double CD
2014-04-07	Top Hits	Warner	#16	Digital download
2019-04-12	The Hits Album: The Car Album	Sony / UMC	#3	Quadruple CD
2019-04-12	The Hits Album: The 70s Pop Album	Sony / UMC	#4	Quadruple CD
2019-04-12	The Hits Album: The 80s Album	Sony / UMC	#5	Quadruple CD
2019-08-02	The Hits Album: The 90s Album	Sony / UMC	#7	Quadruple CD
2019-08-02	The Hits Album: The R&B Album	Sony / UMC	#9	Quadruple CD
2019-08-02	The Hits Album: The Soft Rock Album	Sony / UMC	#5	Quadruple CD
2019-11-01	The Hits Album: The 80s Young Guns Album	Sony / UMC	#7	Quadruple CD
2019-11-01	The Hits Album: The Car Album: On the Road Again...	Sony / UMC	#9	Quadruple CD
2019-11-01	The Hits Album: The Rock Album	Sony / UMC	#8	Quadruple CD
2020-01-24	The Hits Album: The 00s Album	Sony / UMC	#15	Quadruple CD
2020-01-24	The Hits Album: The 60s Album	Sony / UMC	#4	Quadruple CD
2020-01-24	The Hits Album: The 70s Pop Album Strikes Back!	Sony / UMC	#5	Quadruple CD
2020-07-03	The Hits Album: The #1s Album	Sony / UMC	#7	Quadruple CD
2020-07-10	The Hits Album: The 80s Pop Album	Sony / UMC	#6	Quadruple CD
2020-10-02	The Hits Album: The Easy Album	Sony / UMC	#5	Quadruple CD
2020-10-09	The Hits Album: The Floorfillers Album	Sony / UMC	#6	Quadruple CD
2020-12-25	The Hits Album: The Electronic Album	Sony / UMC	#5	Quadruple CD
2021-02-26	The Hits Album: The Seventies Album	Sony / UMC	#3	Triple CD
2021-03-19	The Hits Album: 80s Floorfillers	Sony / UMC	#3	Triple CD
2021-07-02	The Hits Album: The Car Album: Singalong	Sony / UMC	#6	Triple CD
2021-12-24	The Hits Album: Soft Rock Road Trip	Sony / UMC	#22	Triple CD
2022-01-14	The Hits Album: 80s Chartbusters	Sony / UMC	#10	Triple CD
2022-03-25	The Hits Album: Floorfillers: Disco Nights	Sony / UMC	#10	Triple CD
2022-04-29	The Hits Album: The Classic Soul Album	Sony / UMC	#10	Triple CD
2023-01-20	The Hits Album: The Country Album	Sony / Universal	#6	Triple CD
2023-04-07	The Hits Album: 80s Dance	Sony / Universal	#16	Triple CD
2023-05-12	The Hits Album: The 70s Pop Album: The Star Hits Collection	Sony / Universal	#11	Triple CD
2023-06-09	The Hits Album: The Indie Pop Album	Sony / Universal	#16	Triple CD
2023-07-21	The Hits Album: The 80s Pure Pop Album	Sony / Universal	#10	Triple CD
2024-01-19	The Hits Album: The 80s Love Album	Sony / Universal	#11	Triple CD
2024-02-23	The Hits Album: Floorfillers: Throwback Classics	Sony / Universal	#14	Triple CD
2024-08-09	The Hits Album: Early 80s	Sony / Universal	#12	Triple CD
2024-08-23	The Hits Album: Drivetime Classics	Sony / Universal	#4	Triple CD
2024-10-04	The Hits Album: The Glamtastic 70s Album	Sony / Universal	#6	Triple CD
2025-01-03	The Hits Album: Later 80s	Sony / Universal	#12	Triple CD
2025-01-17	The Hits Album: The 70s Love Album	Sony / Universal	#8	Triple CD
2025-02-21	The Hits Album: All Time Greatest Car Songs Album	Sony / Universal	#8	Triple CD
2025-03-07	The Hits Album: The Poptastic 60s Album	Sony / Universal	#7	Triple CD
2025-04-25	The Hits Album: Early 70s	Sony / Universal	#12	Triple CD
2025-09-19	The Hits Album: Later 70s	Sony / Universal	#15	Triple CD
2025-10-10	The Hits Album: Superstars The 80s	Sony / Universal	#16	Triple CD
2026-01-02	The Hits Album: 80s New Wave	Sony / Universal	#16	Triple CD
2026-01-16	The Hits Album: Superstars The 70s	Sony / Universal	#14	Triple CD
2026-02-20	The Hits Album: The Dance Pop Album	Sony / Universal	#9	Triple CD
2026-05-22	The Hits Album: 60s Car Songs	Sony / Universal	#6	Triple CD
2026-06-19	The Hits Album: The Alternative Pop Album	Sony / Universal	#11	Triple CD
2026-09-30	The Hits Album: The Christmas Album			
