= The Hit Pack =

Compilation album by various artists
- Released: 10 December 1990
- Label: CBS/WEA/BMG

The Hits Albums chronology
Snap It Up! Monster Hits 2 (1990)	The Hit Pack (1990)	The Hits Album (15) (1991)

The Hit Pack is a compilation that can be seen as a continuation to the Hits compilation series; therefore, it is also called Hits 13 and The Hits Album 13 on some music streaming services, such as Spotify. It was originally issued by BMG, CBS, and WEA in December 1990 and reached number 2 on the UK Top 20 Compilations Chart. The album was released as a 21-track CD, while the cassette format contained 24 tracks.

== Tracklisting ==
=== CD format ===
1. Deee-Lite - "Groove Is in the Heart (Peanut Butter Mix)"
2. Black Box - "Fantasy"
3. Snap! - "Mary Had a Little Boy"
4. Caron Wheeler - "Livin' in the Light"
5. Seal - "Crazy"
6. The Charlatans - "Then"
7. 808 State - "Cubik (Original Mix)"
8. Aztec Camera and Mick Jones - "Good Morning Britain"
9. Paul Simon - "The Obvious Child (Single Mix)"
10. Gazza and Lindisfarne - "Fog on the Tyne"
11. Twenty 4 Seven featuring Captain Hollywood Project - "Are You Dreaming?"
12. Prince - "Thieves in the Temple (Album Version)"
13. Del Amitri - "Spit in the Rain"
14. The Proclaimers - "King of the Road"
15. Maria McKee - "Show Me Heaven"
16. Berlin - "Take My Breath Away"
17. Deacon Blue - "I'll Never Fall in Love Again"
18. Bobby Vinton - "Blue Velvet"
19. A-ha - "Crying in the Rain (LP Version)"
20. Julee Cruise - "Falling (Edit)"
21. New Kids on the Block - "Tonight"

=== Cassette format ===
Side 1

1. Deee-Lite - "Groove Is in the Heart (Peanut Butter Mix)"
2. Black Box - "Fantasy"
3. Snap! - "Mary Had a Little Boy"
4. The Chimes - "Heaven" (cassette only)
5. Dimples D. - "Sucker DJ's (I Will Survive)" (cassette only)
6. Caron Wheeler - "Livin' in the Light"
7. Seal - "Crazy"
8. The Charlatans - "Then"
9. 808 State - "Cubik (Original Mix)"
10. Aztec Camera and Mick Jones - "Good Morning Britain"
11. The Sisters of Mercy - "More" (cassette only)
12. Paul Simon - "The Obvious Child (Single Mix)"

Side 2

1. Twenty 4 Seven featuring Captain Hollywood Project - "Are You Dreaming?"
2. Prince - "Thieves in the Temple (Album Version)"
3. Del Amitri - "Spit in the Rain"
4. The Proclaimers - "King of the Road"
5. Maria McKee - "Show Me Heaven"
6. Berlin - "Take My Breath Away"
7. Deacon Blue - "I'll Never Fall in Love Again"
8. Bobby Vinton - "Blue Velvet"
9. A-ha - "Crying in the Rain (LP Version)"
10. Julee Cruise - "Falling (Edit)"
11. New Kids on the Block - "Tonight"
12. Gazza and Lindisfarne - "Fog on the Tyne"
