= Fresh Hits 96 =

Compilation album by Various artists
- Released: 31 August 1996
- Recorded: 1990, 1995–1996
- Genre: Pop
- Label: Sony Music TV, warner.esp, Global TV

Various artists chronology
New Hits 96 (1996)	Fresh Hits 96 (1996)	Huge Hits 1996 (1996)

Fresh Hits 96 is a compilation album released in 1996. As a part of the Hits compilation series, it contains UK hit singles from the first half of 1996. The album reached number 2 on the UK compilations chart.

== Track listing ==
=== Disc one ===
1. Fugees - "Killing Me Softly (Album Version without intro)"
2. Los del Río - "Macarena (Bayside Boys Mix)"
3. Mark Morrison - "Crazy (Phil Chill Radio Edit)"
4. Peter Andre - "Mysterious Girl (Radio Edit)"
5. Ant & Dec - "Better Watch Out (Radio Edit)"
6. The Tony Rich Project - "Nobody Knows"
7. Toni Braxton - "You're Makin' Me High (Radio Edit)"
8. Celine Dion - "Because You Loved Me"
9. Simply Red - "We're in This Together"
10. Baddiel and Skinner and The Lightning Seeds - "Three Lions"
11. Backstreet Boys - "We've Got It Goin' On (Radio Edit)"
12. Louise - "Naked"
13. George Michael - "Freedom! '90"
14. Everything but the Girl - "Walking Wounded"
15. Livin' Joy - "Don't Stop Movin' (Radio Mix)"
16. Eternal - "Good Thing"
17. Robert Miles - "Fable (Dream Radio)"
18. DJ Dado - "The X-Files (Radio Edit)"
19. De'Lacy - "That Look"
20. Alison Limerick - "Where Love Lives (Dancing Divas '96 Radio Edit)"
21. Apollo 440 - "Krupa (@440 Edit)"
22. Underworld - "Born Slippy"

=== Disc two ===
1. Manic Street Preachers - "A Design for Life"
2. Ash - "Oh Yeah"
3. Kula Shaker - "Tattva"
4. Suede - "Trash"
5. Ocean Colour Scene - "The Day We Caught the Train"
6. Sleeper - "Sale of the Century"
7. Oasis - "Champagne Supernova"
8. The Presidents of the United States of America - "Peaches"
9. Lush - "500 (Shake Baby Shake)"
10. Space - "Female of the Species (Radio Edit)"
11. 3T - "24/7 (Radio Edit)"
12. Lighthouse Family - "Lifted"
13. M-Beat featuring Jamiroquai - "Do U Know Where You're Coming From (Original Mix)"
14. Busta Rhymes - "Woo-Hah!! Got You All in Check (Album Radio Edit)"
15. Bone Thugs-n-Harmony - "Tha Crossroads (D.J. U-neek's Mo Thug Remix)"
16. SWV - "You're the One"
17. R. Kelly - "I Can't Sleep Baby (If I) (Radio Edit)"
18. The Divine Comedy - "Something for the Weekend"
19. Robson & Jerome - "Daydream Believer"
