= Big Hits 98 =

Compilation album by various artists
- Released: September 19, 1998
- Label: Global / Sony TV / warner.esp

Hits chronology
Fresh Hits 98 (1998)	Big Hits 98 (1998)	Huge Hits 1998 (1998)

Big Hits 98 is a compilation album released in September 1998. It is part of the Hits compilation series begun in 1984.

Big Hits 98 is one of the more popular albums in the series, as it had charted in the UK Compilations Chart at number one and stayed there for five weeks, and was also the first Hits album released in September, avoiding competition with Hits lead rivals Now That's What I Call Music!, who only release main albums in March/April, July and November.

== Disc one ==
1. Five — "Everybody Get Up"
2. All Saints — "Bootie Call" (Club Asylum Dub)
3. Savage Garden – "To the Moon and Back"
4. Another Level — "Freak Me" (C&J Radio Edit)
5. Sweetbox – "Everything's Gonna Be Alright"
6. Will Smith — "Just the Two of Us"
7. Cleopatra — "I Want You Back"
8. Kleshay – "Reasons"
9. Destiny's Child — "With Me"
10. Peter Andre — "Kiss the Girl"
11. Ultra — "The Right Time"
12. Des'ree — "Life"
13. LeAnn Rimes — "How Do I Live"
14. Matthew Marsden — "The Hearts Lone Desire"
15. Catatonia — "Strange Glue"
16. Garbage— "I Think I'm Paranoid"
17. Rod Stewart — "Rocks"
18. The Mavericks — "Dance the Night Away"
19. Suggs — "I Am"
20. Depeche Mode — "Only When I Lose Myself"

== Disc two ==
1. Manic Street Preachers — "If You Tolerate This Your Children Will Be Next"
2. Jamiroquai — "Deeper Underground"
3. Apollo 440 — "Lost in Space"
4. Dario G — "Sunmachine"
5. The Corrs — "What Can I Do"
6. Simply Red — "The Air That I Breathe"
7. Celine Dion and Bee Gees — "Immortality"
8. Steps — "One for Sorrow"
9. Aqua — "Turn Back Time"
10. Alexia — "The Music I Like"
11. Jocelyn Brown — "Ain't No Mountain High Enough"
12. Martha Wash — "Catch the Light" (Todd Terry's 'M&T' Radio Mix)
13. Solid HarmoniE — "I Wanna Love You"
14. Lovestation — "Teardrops"
15. Energy 52 — "Café del Mar '98"
16. N-Trance — "Paradise City"
17. Fatboy Slim — "The Rockafeller Skank"
18. Hi-Rise — "I Believe in Miracles"
19. Echobeatz — "Mas que Nada
20. Los Sombreros — "No Tengo Dinero"
