= Huge Hits 1998 =

Compilation album by Various artists
- Released: November 7, 1998
- Genre: Pop
- Label: Global TV / Sony Music TV / warner.esp

Various artists chronology
| Big Hits 98 (1998) | Huge Hits 1998 (1998) | Hits 99 (1998) |

Huge Hits 1998 is a compilation album released in November 1998. It is part of the Hits compilation series which began in 1984.

Huge Hits 1998 is an end-of-year compilation that combines the biggest hit singles from other Hits releases from earlier in the year. Upon release, the album reached number 1 in the Compilation Chart and was there for two weeks.

== Disc one ==
1. Celine Dion - "My Heart Will Go On"
2. Madonna - "Frozen"
3. B*Witched - "C'est la Vie"
4. Mariah Carey - "My All"
5. Five - "Got the Feelin'"
6. Robbie Williams - "Let Me Entertain You"
7. Steps - "Last Thing on My Mind"
8. Boyzone - "Baby Can I Hold You"
9. Jennifer Paige - "Crush"
10. Another Level - "Be Alone No More"
11. All Saints - "Under The Bridge"
12. Brandy & Monica - "The Boy Is Mine"
13. Wyclef Jean - "Gone till November"
14. Will Smith - "Gettin' Jiggy wit It"
15. Busta Rhymes - "Turn It Up (Remix)/Fire It Up (Clean)"
16. Destiny's Child featuring Wyclef Jean - "No No No (Part 2)"
17. Sweetbox - "Everything's Gonna Be Alright"
18. Cleopatra - "Cleopatra's Theme"
19. Aqua - "Turn Back Time"
20. Backstreet Boys - "All I Have to Give"
21. Spice Girls - "Stop"

== Disc two ==
1. Run–D.M.C. vs. Jason Nevins - "It's Like That"
2. The Tamperer featuring Maya - "Feel It"
3. Mousse T. vs. Hot 'n' Juicy - "Horny '98"
4. Sash! - "La Primavera"
5. Dario G - "Carnaval de Paris"
6. Jamiroquai - "Deeper Underground"
7. Cornershop - "Brimful of Asha (Norman Cook Remix)"
8. Apollo 440 - "Lost in Space"
9. Manic Street Preachers - "If You Tolerate This Your Children Will Be Next"
10. Catatonia - "Mulder and Scully"
11. Kula Shaker - "Sound of Drums"
12. Space with Cerys Matthews - "The Ballad of Tom Jones"
13. Eagle-Eye Cherry - "Save Tonight"
14. Natalie Imbruglia - "Smoke"
15. The Corrs - "Dreams (Tee's Radio Mix)"
16. Simply Red - "Say You Love Me"
17. K-Ci & JoJo - "All My Life"
18. Des'ree - "Life"
19. T-Spoon - "Sex on the Beach"
20. Baddiel, Skinner and The Lightning Seeds - "3 Lions '98"
