= Fresh Hits 98 =

Compilation album by Various artists
- Released: 4 July 1998
- Labels: Sony Music, warner.esp, Global TV

Various artists chronology
New Hits 98 (1998)	Fresh Hits 98 (1998)	Big Hits 98 (1998)

Fresh Hits 98 is a compilation album released in 1998. As a part of the Hits compilation series, it contains UK hit singles from the spring and summer months of 1998. The album reached number 1 on the UK compilations chart and stayed there for six weeks.

== Track listing ==
=== Disc one ===
1. B*Witched - "C'est la Vie"
2. Five - "Got the Feelin'"
3. The Tamperer featuring Maya - "Feel It"
4. Celine Dion - "My Heart Will Go On (Tony Moran Mix)"
5. Steps - "Last Thing on My Mind"
6. Aqua - "Doctor Jones"
7. Lutricia McNeal - "Stranded"
8. Alexia - "Gimme Love"
9. Bus Stop featuring Carl Douglas - "Kung Fu Fighting"
10. Dana International - "Diva"
11. Tina Moore - "Nobody Better"
12. Robyn - "Do You Really Want Me"
13. Baddiel, Skinner and Lightning Seeds - "Three Lions '98"

=== Disc two ===
1. Robbie Williams - "Let Me Entertain You"
2. Natalie Imbruglia - "Wishing I Was There"
3. Catatonia - "Road Rage"
4. Kula Shaker - "Sound of Drums"
5. Tin Tin Out featuring Shelley Nelson - "Here's Where the Story Ends"
6. Simply Red - "Say You Love Me"
7. The Corrs - "Dreams (Tee's Radio)"
8. Rod Stewart - "Ooh La La"
9. Billie Myers - "Kiss the Rain"
10. Lighthouse Family - "High"
11. All Saints - "Never Ever"
12. Super Furry Animals - "Ice Hockey Hair"
13. Freak Power - "No Way"
14. Tzant - "Sounds of the Wickedness"
15. Missy Elliott featuring 702 and Magoo - "Beep Me 911"
16. Aretha Franklin - "A Rose Is Still a Rose"
17. Mase featuring Total - "What You Want"
18. Jay-Z featuring Blackstreet - "The City Is Mine"
19. N.Y.C.C. - "Fight For Your Right (To Party)"
20. 187 Lockdown - "Kung Fu"
