= Hits 8 =

The Hits Album 8

Compilation album by Various Artists
- Released: 18 July 1988
- Labels: CBS and WEA

The Hits Albums chronology
Hits 7 (1987)	The Hits Album 8 (1988)	The Hits Album 9 (1988)

Hits 8 is a 33-track compilation album released in the summer of 1988 by CBS, WEA and BMG Records in the UK. It was released as a double LP, MC and CD. Also known as The Hits Album 8, the compilation was successful and reached #2 in the UK Albums Chart (held off by its rival album Now 12) and achieved a Platinum BPI award.

The Desireless track "Voyage Voyage" had previously appeared in its original mix on Hits 7.

A video selection, The Hits Video 8, was also released on VHS by RCA/Columbia Pictures International Video. This contained a selection of 14 tracks, all of which appear on the album.

Hits 8 features four songs which reached number one on the UK Singles Chart: "I Owe You Nothing", "Perfect", "Don't Turn Around" and "Theme from S-Express".

== Track listing ==
Cat No: CDHITS 8

CD/Record/Tape 1

1. A-ha - "Stay on These Roads"
2. Eighth Wonder - "I'm Not Scared"
3. Michael Jackson with The Jackson 5 - "I Want You Back ('88 Remix)"
4. Five Star - "Another Weekend"
5. Bros - "I Owe You Nothing"
6. Tiffany - "I Saw Him Standing There"
7. Taylor Dayne - "Tell It to My Heart"
8. Desireless - "Voyage voyage"
9. The Pasadenas - "Tribute (Right On)"
10. Matt Bianco - "Don't Blame It on That Girl"
11. Taja Sevelle - "Love Is Contagious (Radio Edit)"
12. Pebbles - "Girlfriend"
13. Rose Royce - "Car Wash ('88 Remix)"
14. Whitney Houston - "Love Will Save the Day"
15. Glen Goldsmith - "What You See Is What You Get"
16. Luther Vandross - "I Gave It Up (When I Fell In Love)"

CD/Record/Tape 2

1. Aztec Camera - "Somewhere in My Heart"
2. Prefab Sprout - "The King of Rock 'n' Roll"
3. Fairground Attraction - "Perfect"
4. Fleetwood Mac - "Everywhere"
5. Cher - "I Found Someone"
6. Sade - "Paradise"
7. Terence Trent D'Arby - "Sign Your Name"
8. Alexander O'Neal - "The Lovers"
9. Eurythmics - "You Have Placed a Chill in My Heart"
10. Aswad - "Don't Turn Around"
11. S'Express - "Theme from S-Express"
12. Debbie Gibson - "Shake Your Love"
13. Erasure - "Chains of Love"
14. Ofra Haza - "Im Nin'alu"
15. The Primitives - "Crash"
16. The Sisters of Mercy - "Lucretia My Reflection"
17. The Jesus and Mary Chain - "Sidewalking"

Video Selection - The Hits Video 8

1. Ofra Haza - "Im Nin'alu"
2. The Primitives - "Crash"
3. The Sisters of Mercy - "Lucretia My Reflection"
4. The Jesus and Mary Chain - "Sidewalking"
5. Aztec Camera - "Somewhere in My Heart"
6. Prefab Sprout - "The King of Rock 'n' Roll"
7. Fairground Attraction - "Perfect"
8. Terence Trent D'Arby - "Sign Your Name"
9. The Pasadenas - "Tribute (Right On)"
10. Matt Bianco - "Don't Blame It on That Girl"
11. Glen Goldsmith - "What You See Is What You Get"
12. Five Star - "Another Weekend"
13. Bros - "I Owe You Nothing"
14. Desireless - "Voyage voyage"
