= Hits 52 =

Compilation album by Various Artists
- Released: 18 March 2002
- Label: Sony Music Entertainment UK/WEA/RCA Ariola/BMG/Telstar UK

Various Artists chronology
| Hits 51 (2001) | Hits 52 (2002) | Hits 53 (2002) |

Hits 52 is a compilation album released in the UK in March 2002. It contains 40 tracks over two CDs, including three number one singles on the UK Singles Chart from Will Young, Westlife, and Daniel Bedingfield.

The music video for Will Young's "Evergreen" was featured as a bonus enhanced feature on disc two.

== Track listing ==
Disc one

| No. | Title | Artist | Length |
|---|---|---|---|
| 1. | "Evergreen" | Will Young | 4:11 |
| 2. | "World of Our Own" | Westlife | 3:29 |
| 3. | "Suerte (Whenever, Wherever)" | Shakira | 3:15 |
| 4. | "B with Me" (Bump & Flex Radio Edit) | Mis-Teeq | 3:37 |
| 5. | "Love Foolosophy" | Jamiroquai | 3:45 |
| 6. | "One Day in Your Life" | Anastacia | 3:27 |
| 7. | "Emotion" | Destiny's Child | 3:56 |
| 8. | "Break Ya Neck" | Busta Rhymes | 3:52 |
| 9. | "Ain't It Funny" | Jennifer Lopez | 4:03 |
| 10. | "Brotha" | Angie Stone | 4:27 |
| 11. | "All You Want" | Dido | 4:03 |
| 12. | "Wrong Impression" | Natalie Imbruglia | 3:21 |
| 13. | "I'm a Slave 4 U" | Britney Spears | 3:24 |
| 14. | "Caught in the Middle" | A1 | 3:26 |
| 15. | "I Know Him So Well" | Steps | 4:13 |
| 16. | "Me, Myself and I" | Jive Jones | 3:23 |
| 17. | "How Wonderful You Are" | Gordon Haskell | 3:56 |
| 18. | "Sugar for the Soul" | Steve Balsamo | 3:04 |
| 19. | "Hate to Say I Told You So" | The Hives | 3:20 |
| 20. | "Nothing" | A | 3:42 |
| 21. | "How You Remind Me" | Nickelback | 3:43 |

Disc two

| No. | Title | Artist | Length |
|---|---|---|---|
| 1. | "Get the Party Started" | Pink | 3:13 |
| 2. | "Addicted to Bass" (Apollo 440 Mix) | Puretone | 3:49 |
| 3. | "Gotta Get Thru This" | Daniel Bedingfield | 2:42 |
| 4. | "Point of View" | DB Boulevard | 3:51 |
| 5. | "So Lonely" | Jakatta | 3:39 |
| 6. | "Rapture" | iiO | 3:11 |
| 7. | "Sexual Guarantee" | Alcazar | 3:35 |
| 8. | "Speed (Can You Feel It?)" | Azzido Da Bass featuring Roland Clark | 3:05 |
| 9. | "On the Run" | Tillmann Uhrmacher | 3:04 |
| 10. | "The Whistle Song" | DJ Aligator | 3:13 |
| 11. | "Everybody's a Rockstar" | Tall Paul | 2:49 |
| 12. | "The Drill" | Dirt Devils | 2:44 |
| 13. | "Runnin'" | Mark Picchiotti presents Basstoy featuring Dana | 3:10 |
| 14. | "True Love Never Dies" | Flip & Fill featuring Kelly Llorenna | 3:29 |
| 15. | "Into the Sun" | Weekend Players | 3:47 |
| 16. | "Bring It On to My Love" | De Nada | 3:24 |
| 17. | "Haters" | So Solid Crew presents Mr. Shabz featuring MBD and The Reelists | 4:19 |
| 18. | "Bad Babysitter" | Princess Superstar | 3:34 |
| 19. | "Hit 'Em Up Style (Oops!)" | Blu Cantrell | 4:23 |
