= The Hits Album 9 =

Compilation album by Various Artists
- Released: 5 December 1988
- Labels: CBS and WEA

The Hits Albums chronology
Hits 8 (1988)	The Hits Album 9 (1988)	The Hits Album 10 (1989)

The Hits Album is a compilation album released by BMG, CBS and WEA in December 1988 and is the ninth volume of the long-running Hits compilation series.

It charted on December 17, 1988 on the UK Top 100 Album chart. Possibly in response to the comparatively lower selling The Hits Album 8, the record labels involved in this follow up volume decided to re-boot the Hits series, and this Hits Album was released without the expected chronological '9' and with markedly different artwork and design. The front cover artwork was a scene captured from the television advertising campaign.

Further differences to the previous Hits volumes included fewer tracks at 30, but with the added benefit that there were no longer early fades on any of the tracks. The LP gatefold included pictures and artist information to accompany each song, but this wasn't included on the CD and MC formats.

The compilation is listed as The Hits Album 9 in The Complete Book of the British Charts and other chart statistic publications due to the catalogue number 'CDHITS9'. It is also known as The Hits Album 9 to avoid confusion with two other albums simply titled The Hits Album (the 1st and 14th editions of the series).

The re-boot seemingly failed, and the album stalled at number 5 in the UK Top 100 Album chart, the lowest charting Hits album on the main album chart. On January 14, 1989, various artists compilation albums were excluded from the main chart and The Hits Album transferred to the new Compilations Top 20 for the rest of its run, peaking (in the very first compilation chart) at number 4. It includes two songs which reached number one on the UK Singles Chart: "Orinoco Flow" and "One Moment in Time".

== Track listing ==
CD/Record/Tape 1

1. Bros: "Cat Among the Pigeons"
2. a-ha: "You Are the One" (remix)
3. Kim Wilde: "Never Trust a Stranger"
4. Gloria Estefan and Miami Sound Machine: "1-2-3" (remix)
5. Debbie Gibson: "Foolish Beat"
6. The Pasadenas: "Enchanted Lady"
7. Prince: "I Wish U Heaven"
8. Enya: "Orinoco Flow"
9. Chris de Burgh: "Missing You"
10. Fairground Attraction: "Find My Love"
11. Deacon Blue: "Real Gone Kid"
12. Everything but the Girl: "I Don't Want to Talk About It"
13. Tanita Tikaram: "Twist in My Sobriety" (LP edit)
14. Robbie Robertson: "Somewhere Down the Crazy River"

CD/Record/Tape 2

1. Yazz: "Stand Up for Your Love Rights"
2. Matt Bianco: "Wap-Bam-Boogie"
3. Royal House: "Can You Party"
4. The Funky Worm: "The Spell! (Get Down with the Genie)"
5. Kraze: "The Party"
6. Samantha Fox: "Love House"
7. Karyn White: "The Way You Love Me"
8. Rick Astley: "She Wants to Dance with Me"
9. Whitney Houston: "One Moment in Time"
10. Bill Withers: "Lovely Day" ('88 Ben Liebrand remix)
11. Alexander O'Neal: "Fake '88"
12. The Bangles: "In Your Room"
13. Angry Anderson: "Suddenly (The Wedding Theme from Neighbours)"
14. Londonbeat: "9 A.M. (The Comfort Zone)"
15. The Proclaimers: "Sunshine on Leith"
16. Chris Rea: "Driving Home for Christmas"
