= Hits 93 Volume 4 =

Compilation album by various artists
- Released: 8 November 1993
- Recorded: Various
- Label: Telstar Records/BMG

The Hits Albums chronology
Hits 93 Volume 3 (1993)	Hits 93 Volume 4 (1993)	Hits 94 Volume 1 (1993)

Hits 93 Volume 4 was the final compilation in a series of four albums collecting the biggest hits of 1993. It was released by Telstar Records and BMG, and it charted at #2 in November 1993.

The Hits 93 series are considered an extension of the original The Hits Album series which ran from 1984 to 1991, which BMG issued in association with CBS and WEA from 1986. The relaunched Hits brand differed from the original series because it was a single CD as opposed to the original double-album format which was popular in the 1980s.

== Track listing ==
1. Take That featuring Lulu – "Relight My Fire"
2. Cappella – "U Got 2 Let the Music"
3. Frankie Goes to Hollywood – "Relax (MCMXCIII Remix)"
4. M People – "Moving On Up (Master Edit)"
5. The Shamen – "Comin' on Strong"
6. 2 Unlimited – "Maximum Overdrive"
7. Culture Beat – "Mr. Vain"
8. Haddaway – "Life"
9. Urban Cookie Collective – "Feels Like Heaven"
10. The Time Frequency – "Real Love"
11. DJ Jazzy Jeff & The Fresh Prince – "Boom! Shake the Room"
12. Lisa Stansfield – "So Natural" (Be Boy Mix)
13. Chris Rea – "Julia"
14. Björk featuring David Arnold – "Play Dead"
15. Captain Hollywood Project – "More and More"
16. The Grid – "Texas Cowboys"
17. Lovestation – "Best of My Love"
18. SWV – "Right Here" (Human Nature Mix)
19. Oui 3 – "For What It's Worth"
20. Right Said Fred – "Bumped"
21. Bitty McLean – "Pass It On"
