= Hits 97 =

Compilation album by various artists
- Released: 11 November 1996
- Labels: Sony Music TV, Global TV, warner.esp

Various artists chronology
Huge Hits 1996 (1996)	Hits 97 (1996)	New Hits 1997 (1997)

Hits 97 is a compilation album released in 1996. As a part of the Hits compilation series, it contains UK hit singles from mid-to-late 1996. The album had a rivalry with Now 35 released later in the month - due to the longstanding rivalry between the Now and Hits compilation series. Some royalties from Hits 97 went to three different children's charities due to the inclusion of the final track, "Knockin' on Heaven's Door" by Dunblane. Hits 97 was one of the only Hits albums to feature a non-single, "D'Yer Wanna Be a Spaceman?" by Oasis. (see Notes section)

== Notes ==
- Felix's song "Don't You Want Me" is the "'96 Pugilist Mix" which features samples from the Tango Blackcurrant TV advert St George.
- Oasis' song "D'Yer Wanna Be a Spaceman?" is unusually featured, as it was not a 1996 single but in fact a B-side to the single Shakermaker, which was released in 1994. Its inclusion is perhaps due to Oasis' vast popularity at the time of release. The rival Now! series had also included earlier Oasis songs on the first two of their three 1996 releases.
- Royalties from Dunblane's song "Knockin' on Heaven's Door" were split between the charities Save the Children, Childline and Children's Hospice Association Scotland.

== Track listing ==
=== Disc one ===
1. "What Becomes of the Brokenhearted" - Robson & Jerome
2. "Child" - Mark Owen
3. "No Woman, No Cry" - Fugees (Refugee Camp)
4. "Angel" - Simply Red
5. "Cosmic Girl" - Jamiroquai
6. "I Love You Always Forever" - Donna Lewis
7. "Breakfast at Tiffany's" - Deep Blue Something
8. "It's All Coming Back to Me Now" - Celine Dion
9. "I'll Never Break Your Heart" - Backstreet Boys
10. "Forever Love" - Gary Barlow
11. "Trippin'" - Mark Morrison
12. "Flava" - Peter Andre
13. "Golden Brown" - Kaleef
14. "1st of tha Month" - Bone Thugs-N-Harmony
15. "I Need You" - 3T
16. "I Belong to You" - Gina G
17. "One and One" - Robert Miles featuring Maria Nayler
18. "Follow The Rules" - Livin' Joy
19. "Oh What A Night" - Clock

=== Disc two ===
1. "You're Gorgeous" - Babybird
2. "Hey Dude" - Kula Shaker
3. "Place Your Hands" - Reef
4. "Kevin Carter" - Manic Street Preachers
5. "What If..." - The Lightning Seeds
6. "The Frog Princess" - The Divine Comedy
7. "The Circle" - Ocean Colour Scene
8. "One to Another" - The Charlatans
9. "Statuesque" - Sleeper
10. "D'Yer Wanna Be a Spaceman?" - Oasis
11. "Breathe" - The Prodigy
12. "Insomnia" - Faithless
13. "Don't You Want Me" - Felix ("'96 Pugilist Mix", although it is only referred to as such in the booklet)
14. "Driving" - Everything but the Girl
15. "Your Secret Love" - Luther Vandross
16. "On My Way Home" - Enya
17. "No More Alcohol" - Suggs
18. "When I Fall in Love" - Ant & Dec
19. "Country Boy" - Jimmy Nail
20. "Hillbilly Rock Hillbilly Roll" - The Woolpackers
21. "Knockin' on Heaven's Door" - Ted Christopher, Mark Knopfler on guitar, relatives of the Dunblane school massacre victims
