= The Hits Album (15) =

Compilation album by Various artists
- Released: 29 July 1991
- Recorded: Various
- Label: Sony Music/BMG

The Hits Albums chronology
The Hit Pack (1990)	The Hits Album (15) (1991)	Hits 93 Volume 1 (1993)

The Hits Album is a compilation album compiled by Sony Music TV, BMG and Cookie Jar Records, and released in the UK in August 1991. The album is considered an extension of the Hits series which was originally launched in 1984.

Although it is often listed as The Hits Album 15 in chart database books such as The Complete Book of British Charts, this is the fourteenth volume of the series. The mistake was made by the compilers, Cookie Jar TV, who gave the album the catalogue number HITSCD15.

The compilation is notably soft-mixed and each track segues into the next. Although a number-one album in the UK Top 20 Compilations Chart, the partners behind the Hits brand briefly retired the series after this volume. BMG then partnered the established TV marketing company Telstar Records in 1993 for the Hits 93 collections.

== Track listing ==
CD 1

1. Salt-N-Pepa - "Do You Want Me"
2. Kenny Thomas - "Thinking About Your Love"
3. Sonia - "Only Fools (Never Fall in Love)"
4. New Kids on the Block - "Call It What You Want"
5. Kylie Minogue - "Shocked"
6. Chesney Hawkes - "I'm a Man Not a Boy"
7. The Simpsons - "Deep, Deep Trouble"
8. Driza Bone - "Real Love"
9. Whitney Houston - "My Name Is Not Susan"
10. Dannii Minogue - "Success"
11. Technotronic - "Move That Body"
12. C+C Music Factory - "Here We Go (Let's Rock & Roll)"
13. Rebel MC featuring Tenor Fly and Barrington Levy - "Tribal Bass"
14. Cubic 22 - "Night in Motion"
15. Quadrophonia - "Wave of the Future"
16. Cola Boy - "7 Ways to Love"

CD 2

1. Erasure - "Chorus"
2. Seal - "Future Love Paradise"
3. P.M. Dawn - "A Watcher's Point of View (Don't 'Cha Think)"
4. Gary Clail On-U Sound System - "Human Nature"
5. R.E.M. - "Shiny Happy People"
6. Pop Will Eat Itself - "92 Degrees"
7. Carter the Unstoppable Sex Machine - "Sheriff Fatman"
8. Alice Cooper - "Hey Stoopid"
9. Rod Stewart featuring The Temptations - "The Motown Song"
10. Bette Midler - "From a Distance"
11. Gloria Estefan - "Remember Me with Love"
12. Alison Limerick - "Where Love Lives"
13. Crystal Waters - "Gypsy Woman (She's Homeless)"
14. Beverley Craven - "Promise Me"
15. Harry Connick Jr. - "Recipe for Love"
16. Rick Astley - "Never Knew Love"
