= Clubland (compilation series) =

Dance music compilation album series

- Cover of Vol.1

Compilation album by Various Artists
- Released: 24 June 2002–2019, 2025
- Genre: Pop remixes (Dance-pop, Electropop), Hardcore, Happy Hardcore, Trance
- Label: Universal Music TV, All Around the World Productions (2002-2019) / Sony Music, EMI Records (2025)

Clubland is a series of compilation albums from Clubland released by Universal Music TV and All Around the World Productions.

== Series overview ==
Title	Release date	Catalog #	Peak chart positions		Certifications
Title	Release date	Catalog #	UK Comp	UK Dance	Certifications
Clubland: The Ride of Your Life	24 June 2002	583 601-2	1	–	UK: Platinum
Clubland II: The Ride of Your Life	11 November 2002	068 063-2	1	–	UK: Platinum
Clubland III: The Sound of the Summer	23 June 2003	980 026-7	1	–	UK: Platinum
Clubland 4: The Night of Your Life	10 November 2003	981 359-8	1	–	UK: Platinum
Clubland 5	12 July 2004	982 206-3	1	–	UK: Gold
Clubland 6	8 November 2004	982 582-9	2	–	UK: Gold
Clubland 7	27 June 2005	983 116-1	1	–	UK: Gold
Clubland 8	7 November 2005	983 454-6	2	5	UK: Gold
Clubland 9	26 June 2006	984 126-7	1	2	UK: Gold
Clubland 10	6 November 2006	984 476-5	1	3	UK: Gold
Clubland 11	18 June 2007	06000753006559	1	4	UK: Gold
Clubland 12	5 November 2007	530 459-3	1	1	UK: Gold
Clubland Classix – The Album of Your Life	31 March 2008	530 7568	1	1	UK: Platinum
Clubland 13	23 June 2008	530 975-8	1	2	UK: Gold
Clubland 14	10 November 2008	531 405-5	1	2	UK: Gold
Clubland Classix 2 – The Album of Your Life Is Back	9 April 2009	531 759-4	1	3	UK: Gold
Clubland 15	28 June 2009	532 014-2	1	11	UK: Gold
Clubland 16	9 November 2009	272 668-8	1	1	UK: Gold
Clubland 17	27 June 2010	532 887-8	1	1	UK: Gold
Clubland 18	8 November 2010	533 174-1	1	1	UK: Gold
Clubland 19	27 June 2011	533 477-4	1	1	UK: Gold
Clubland 20	7 November 2011	533 674-5	1	5	UK: Gold
Clubland 21	25 June 2012	533 926-3	1	1	UK: Gold
Clubland Eurodance	13 August 2012	533 995-4	4	2	UK: Silver
Clubland 22	5 November 2012	534 120-2	3	3	UK: Gold
Euphoric Clubland	29 April 2013	534 302-7	2	2	UK: Gold
Clubland 23	7 June 2013	534 390-5	1	2	UK: Silver
Clubland 24	11 November 2013	534 673-9	3	3	UK: Silver
Clubland 25	14 July 2014	535 253-4	5	1	
Clubland 26	3 November 2014	535 598-0	9	5	UK: Silver
Clubland 27	7 August 2015	536 323-5	3	1	
Clubland 28	13 November 2015	536 520-8	13	3	
100% Clubland Classix	17 May 2019	538 714-2	2	1	UK: Gold
Now Presents...Clubland	28 March 2025	CDNNNOW153	1	1	

== See also ==
- Clubland X-Treme Hardcore (compilation series)
- Clubland (dance brand)
