= Hits 93 Volume 3 =

Compilation album by various artists
- Released: 2 August 1993
- Recorded: Various
- Label: Telstar Records/BMG

The Hits Albums chronology
| Hits 93 Volume 2 (1993) | Hits 93 Volume 3 (1993) | Hits 93 Volume 4 (1993) |

Hits 93 Volume 3 is a compilation album was released on 16 August 1993 and was released by Telstar Records in association with BMG. The CD and cassette releases were subtitled "22 Hot Summer Hits". The LP vinyl format featured 20 tracks.

The album was the third volume of four released in 1993 collecting the biggest hits of the year, much like the original The Hits Album collections which were originally issued between 1984 and 1991. BMG became involved in the series from 1986 onwards.

Due to the compilers having full access to BMG material, hits by artists such as Take That, M People, Snap! and Lisa Stansfield appeared on this collection instead of the rival Now That's What I Call Music 25 which featured material licensed from EMI, Virgin and Polygram. However, there were some tracks which featured on both compilations, such as Kim Wilde, 4 Non Blondes and Inner Circle.

The compilation reached No. 2 in the UK Top 20 Compilation chart (behind Now 25) and earned a Gold BPI Award for units of over 400,000.

== Track listing ==
TCD 2680 (*-edited tracks)

1. Take That – "Pray"
2. 4 Non Blondes – "What's Up?"
3. M People – "One Night in Heaven"*
4. Haddaway – "What Is Love"
5. Kim Wilde – "If I Can't Have You"*
6. Snap! – "Do You See the Light (Looking For)"*
7. Jade – "I Wanna Love You"*
8. Lisa Stansfield – "In All the Right Places"*
9. Sarah Washington – "I Will Always Love You"*
10. Dannii Minogue – "This Is It"
11. Inner Circle – "Sweat (A La La La La Long)"*
12. Ali & Frazier – "Uptown Top Ranking"
13. Bitty McLean – "It Keeps Rainin'
14. Robin S. – "Luv 4 Luv"*
15. Urban Cookie Collective – "The Key the Secret"
16. Black Box – "Rockin' to the Music"
17. Stan – "Suntan"*
18. Oui 3 – "Break From the Old Routine"
19. Sister Sledge – "Thinking of You (Sure is Pure 93 Remix)"
20. Evolution – "Everybody Dance"
21. Maxima featuring Lily – "Ibiza"*
22. Dr. Alban – "It's My Life"*

Tracks 20 and 21 were not included on the LP format, and the rest of the tracks were presented in a different order.
