= Motown 50 =

Compilation album by Various Artists
- Released: December 1, 2008
- Genres: R&B, pop, soul

Motown 50 is a compilation album released to coincide with the 50th anniversary of Motown Records.

== Track listing ==
Disc one
No.	Title	Artist	Length
1.	"I Heard It Through The Grapevine"	Marvin Gaye	3:16
2.	"Dancing in the Street"	Martha & the Vandellas	2:36
3.	"Baby Love"	The Supremes	2:36
4.	"I Can't Help Myself (Sugar Pie, Honey Bunch)"	The Four Tops	2:46
5.	"Needle in a Haystack"	The Velvelettes	2:31
6.	"Get Ready"	The Temptations	2:33
7.	"You Can't Hurry Love"	The Supremes	2:46
8.	"Heaven Must Have Sent You"	The Elgins	2:32
9.	"Nowhere to Run"	Martha & the Vandellas	2:57
10.	"Jimmy Mack"	Martha & the Vandellas	2:54
11.	"This Old Heart of Mine (Is Weak for You)"	The Isley Brothers	2:47
12.	"The Tears of a Clown"	Smokey Robinson & the Miracles	3:05
13.	"ABC"	The Jackson 5	3:00
14.	"It Takes Two"	Marvin Gaye & Kim Weston	2:56
15.	"My Guy"	Mary Wells	2:49
16.	"Do You Love Me"	The Contours	2:54
17.	"Do I Love You (Indeed I Do)"	Frank Wilson	2:22
18.	"There's a Ghost in My House"	R. Dean Taylor	2:15
19.	"Stop! In the Name of Love"	The Supremes	2:53
20.	"Shotgun"	Junior Walker & the All-Stars	3:00
21.	"Signed, Sealed, Delivered (I'm Yours)"	Stevie Wonder	2:40
22.	"I Want You Back"	The Jackson 5	2:58
23.	"You Are Everything"	Marvin Gaye & Diana Ross	2:54
24.	"Ain't No Mountain High Enough"	Diana Ross	3:35

Disc two
No.	Title	Artist	Length
1.	"Superstition"	Stevie Wonder	4:02
2.	"Papa Was a Rollin' Stone"	The Temptations	6:52
3.	"What's Going On"	Marvin Gaye	3:55
4.	"Brick House"	Commodores	3:35
5.	"War"	Edwin Starr	3:22
6.	"My Girl"	The Temptations	2:57
7.	"The Tracks of My Tears"	Smokey Robinson & the Miracles	2:52
8.	"Endless Love"	Lionel Richie & Diana Ross	4:27
9.	"Easy"	Commodores	4:18
10.	"Reflections"	Diana Ross & the Supremes	2:50
11.	"Reach Out, I'll Be There"	The Four Tops	2:56
12.	"Let's Get It On"	Marvin Gaye	4:53
13.	"What Becomes of the Brokenhearted"	Jimmy Ruffin	2:56
14.	"Got to Be There"	Michael Jackson	3:20
15.	"Being with You"	Smokey Robinson	3:57
16.	"I'm Still Waiting"	Diana Ross	3:46
17.	"Sir Duke"	Stevie Wonder	3:54
18.	"Love Machine"	The Miracles	2:54
19.	"All Night Long (All Night)"	Lionel Richie	4:14
20.	"Love Hangover"	Diana Ross	3:51

Disc three
No.	Title	Artist	Length
1.	"Master Blaster (Jammin')"	Stevie Wonder	4:51
2.	"Nightshift"	Commodores	4:59
3.	"Upside Down"	Diana Ross	4:03
4.	"Super Freak"	Rick James	3:19
5.	"Treat Her Like a Lady"	The Temptations	4:13
6.	"My Destiny"	Lionel Richie	3:42
7.	"Light My Fire"	Stevie Wonder	3:40
8.	"Everybody's Talking"	The Four Tops	2:54
9.	"Get Ready"	Rare Earth	2:46
10.	"Let's Do It (Let's Fall in Love)"	Marvin Gaye & Kim Weston	2:23
11.	"I Say a Little Prayer"	Martha & the Vandellas	3:04
12.	"Wichita Lineman"	Smokey Robinson & the Miracles	2:53
13.	"Jumpin' Jack Flash"	Thelma Houston	3:23
14.	"The First Time Ever I Saw Your Face"	The Temptations	4:09
15.	"Come Together"	The Supremes	4:09
16.	"Put a Little Love in Your Heart"	David Ruffin	2:44
17.	"You've Got a Friend"	Michael Jackson	4:55

== Charts ==
Chart (2008–2009)	Peak position
Japanese Albums (Oricon)	285
Swiss Compilation Albums (Schweizer Hitparade)	5
UK Compilation Albums (Official Charts)	3
US Compilation Albums (Billboard)	8
US Top R&B/Hip-Hop Albums (Billboard)	89

== Certifications ==
Region	Certification	Certified units/sales
United Kingdom (BPI)	Platinum	300,000^{^}
^{^} Shipments figures based on certification alone.
