= Milky =

Italian electronic music group

- Origin: Padova, Italy
- Genre: House
- Years active: 2002–present
- Labels: Motivo, Columbia
- Members: Giordano Trivellato; Giuliano Sacchetto
- Website: https://www.motivo.it/portfolio/milky/

Milky is an Italian dance music production group consisting of producers Giordano Trivellato and Giuliano Sacchetto, with Italian singer Giuditta Gazza serving as their lead singer on their album Star. They are best known for their 2002 single "Just the Way You Are".

Although Gazza was the group's singer, an Egyptian-born model, Sabrina Elahl, was used for the music video for "Just the Way You Are" and its vinyl cover. Gazza features on the "Be My World" 12" cover as well as in the video for "In My Mind".

Two of the tracks from Star eventually became hits in the United States; "Just the Way You Are" reached the number one position on the Billboard Hot Dance Airplay chart in 2002. The track also reached No. 8 on the UK Singles Chart. In September 2005, "Be My World" peaked at number 6 on the Hot Dance Airplay chart and also charted in Sweden.

"Just the Way You Are" saw a resurgence of popularity in 2026 after a remix by Australian DJ Mall Grab went viral on TikTok, as well as its use as a fan chant for footballer Antoine Semenyo. The song was also remixed by Australian group Pnau and French DJ David Guetta the same year, using a sample of Stardust from "Music Sounds Better with You".

== Discography ==
=== Studio albums ===
Title	Album details
Star	Released: 2002; Label: Motivo

=== Singles ===
Year	Title	Peak chart positions										Album
Year	Title	ITA	AUS	BEL	IRE	NED	NZ	SCO	SWE	UK	US Dance	Album
2002	"Just the Way You Are"	—	47	36	9	36	29	13	—	8	1	Star
2002	"In My Mind"	49	—	—	—	—	—	44	—	48	—	Star
2003	"Be My World"	—	—	—	—	—	—	—	52	—	4	Star
2026	"Just the Way You Are" (with Mall Grab)	—	23	30	—	—	—	—	—	—	—	Non-album single
2026	"Just the Way You Are" (with David Guetta)	—	—	—	—	—	—	—	—	—	—	Non-album single
"—" denotes items that did not chart or were not released in that territory.
