= Telstar TV =

- Country: United Kingdom
- Broadcast area: London
- Headquarters: Birmingham

Programming
- Language: English
- Picture format: PAL 576i

History
- Launched: 1984; 42 years ago
- Closed: 1984; 42 years ago

Availability

Terrestrial
- UHF (Sutton Coldfield): Channel 40

Telstar TV was the first pirate television station known to operate in the United Kingdom. It operated on the local BBC2 frequency late Friday nights after its closedown and was first planned in 1983.

== History ==
The station was formed in 1982 and started test broadcasts around May 1983 under the tentative name Second City Vision, broadcasting on UHF channel 40, which housed BBC2, carrying low-power signal tests on late Fridays/early Saturdays after the channel's closedown. It attracted some publicity in the local press and hoped to air programmes soon. Its service area was small, and was reportedly limited to Edgbaston.

By early 1984, the station was fully operational, this time bearing the name Telstar TV, attracting an audience of over 5,000 viewers by February. Programming consisted of pop videos and horror movies, as well as pre-recorded continuity announcements by John Taylor. Conventional movies such as Kramer vs. Kramer were also broadcast. Despite being on air on average between 1-5am, the station refused to air video nasties or softcore films. During its brief existence, Telstar received letters from beyond Birmingham, not just from the youth, but from a broad range of demographics. One 68-year old man wrote to the station asking for competition to make it healthier and noting that the programming on the conventional channels of the time was "boring".

The station was targeted by the Birmingham Evening Mail, which ultimately led to the station's closure, with its equipment being suspended to avoid detection. This ignited a show of support from the national press, as well as from MP Antony Beaumont-Dark, who wanted the station to be legalised. IBA engineer Jack Reedy criticised the station's existence on television. By the summer of 1984, it promised to have a better organisation and increase the amount of videos seen, but they were also fearing detection from British Telecom engineers.
