= Just the Way You Are (Milky song) =

2002 single by Milky

Single by Milky

from the album Star
- Released: 19 August 2002
- Genre: House
- Length: 3:30
- Label: Motivo
- Songwriters: Giordano Trivellato; Giuliano Sacchetto; Paul McCartney; Linda McCartney; Grant McLennan; Robert Forster
- Producers: Giordano Trivellato; Giuliano Sacchetto

Milky singles chronology
"Just the Way You Are" (2002)	"In My Mind" (2002)

Music video
- "Just the Way You Are" on YouTube

"Just the Way You Are" is a song by Italian house music group Milky, released as their debut single in August 2002. Although it did not chart in the band's home country, it was a top-10 hit in the United Kingdom, reaching number eight on the UK Singles Chart, and charted within the top 30 in Ireland, the Netherlands, New Zealand, and Romania. In the United States, it was the first official number-one single on the Billboard Dance Radio Airplay chart, although it had already reached number one when it was still an unpublished chart.

The song saw a resurgence of popularity in 2026 after a remix by Australian DJ Mall Grab went viral on TikTok, as well as its use as a fan chant for footballer Antoine Semenyo. The song was also remixed by Australian group Pnau and French DJ David Guetta the same year, using a sample from Stardust's "Music Sounds Better with You".

== Composition ==
The track features an Ibiza-influenced guitar sound, courtesy of a sample of "Streets of Your Town" by the Australian pop group the Go-Betweens. The vocals are by singer Giuditta Gazza, whose lyrical "do-do-do's" make up the song's chorus line and interpolates "Listen to What the Man Said" by Paul McCartney & Wings.

For the single release, Giordano Trivellato and Giuliano Sacchetto were the only songwriters credited outside the United States, while in the US, Paul and Linda McCartney were also credited. The American Society of Composers, Authors and Publishers (ASCAP) credits two additional writers: Grant McLennan and Robert Forster of the Go-Betweens.

== Music video ==
For the song's video and promotional campaign during its chart run, Egyptian model Sabrina Elahl is featured in the music video instead of Giuditta.

== Track listings ==
Italian maxi-CD single

1. "Just the Way You Are" (original FM cut) – 3:28
2. "Just the Way You Are" (original extended mix) – 6:15
3. "Just the Way You Are" (Liquid People Manners vocal) – 7:04
4. "Just the Way You Are" (Full Intention club mix) – 7:31
5. "Just the Way You Are" (Full Intention radio mix) – 3:11
6. "Just the Way You Are" (Almighty mix) – 7:08

European CD single

1. "Just the Way You Are" (radio edit) – 3:31
2. "Just the Way You Are" (Full Intention club mix) – 7:17

UK CD single

1. "Just the Way You Are" (radio edit) – 3:31
2. "Just the Way You Are" (Full Intention club mix) – 7:17
3. "Just the Way You Are" (Almighty mix) – 7:08

UK 12-inch single

A. "Just the Way You Are" (original mix) – 6:15
B. "Just the Way You Are" (Full Intention club mix) – 7:17

UK cassette single

1. "Just the Way You Are" (radio edit) – 3:31
2. "Just the Way You Are" (Full Intention club mix) – 7:17

US maxi-CD single

1. "Just the Way You Are" (original FM cut) – 3:30
2. "Just the Way You Are" (original extended mix) – 6:15
3. "Just the Way You Are" (Gardeweg mix) – 6:00
4. "Just the Way You Are" (Almighty mix) – 7:08
5. "Just the Way You Are" (Full Intention club mix) – 7:32
6. "Just the Way You Are" (Liquid People main mix) – 7:00

US 12-inch single

A1. "Just the Way You Are" (original extended mix) – 6:15
A2. "Just the Way You Are" (Almighty mix) – 7:08
B1. "Just the Way You Are" (Gardeweg mix) – 6:00
B2. "Just the Way You Are" (Liquid People main mix) – 7:00

Australian maxi-CD single

1. "Just the Way You Are" (original FM cut) – 3:28
2. "Just the Way You Are" (Full Intention radio mix) – 3:11
3. "Just the Way You Are" (original extended mix) – 6:15
4. "Just the Way You Are" (Full Intention club mix) – 7:31
5. "Just the Way You Are" (Almighty mix) – 7:08

== Charts ==
=== Original version ===
==== Weekly charts ====
2002–2003 weekly chart performance for "Just the Way You Are"
Chart (2002–2003)	Peak position
Australia (ARIA)	47
Belgium (Ultratop 50 Flanders)	36
Belgium (Ultratip Bubbling Under Wallonia)	11
Europe (Eurochart Hot 100)	40
Ireland (IRMA)	24
Ireland Dance (IRMA)	4
Netherlands (Dutch Top 40)	18
Netherlands (Single Top 100)	58
New Zealand (Recorded Music NZ)	29
Romania Airplay (Romanian Top 100)	21
Scottish Singles Sales (Official Charts)	13
UK Singles (Official Charts)	8
UK Dance (Official Charts)	1
US Dance Radio Airplay (Billboard)	1
US Dance Singles Sales (Billboard)	17

2026 weekly chart performance for "Just the Way You Are"
Chart (2026)	Peak position
Czech Republic Airplay (ČNS IFPI)	14
Estonia Airplay (TopHit)	17
Finland Airplay (Radiosoittolista)	100
Global Excl. US (Billboard)	195
Ireland (IRMA)	9
Germany Airplay (BVMI)	60
Latvia Airplay (LaIPA)	13
Lithuania (AGATA)	9
Malta Airplay (Radiomonitor)	20
Netherlands (Single Top 100)	36
Russia Streaming (TopHit)	63
Slovakia Airplay (ČNS IFPI)	59
Sweden Heatseeker (Sverigetopplistan)	17
Ukraine Airplay (TopHit)	71
UK Singles (Official Charts)	11
UK Dance (Official Charts)	1

==== Monthly charts ====
Monthly chart performance for "Just the Way You Are"
Chart (2026)	Peak position
Estonia Airplay (TopHit)	21

==== Year-end charts ====
Year-end chart performance for "Just the Way You Are"
Chart (2002)	Position
UK Singles (OCC)	167
UK Airplay (Music Week)	56

=== Mall Grab remix ===
==== Weekly charts ====
Weekly chart performance for "Just the Way You Are" (Mall Grab) remix)
Chart (2026)	Peak position
Australia (ARIA)	23
Belgium (Ultratop 50 Flanders)	30
CIS Airplay (TopHit)	112
Canada AC (Billboard)	25
Estonia Airplay (TopHit)	32
Germany (GfK)	76
Global Dance Radio (Billboard/WARM)	2
Latvia Airplay (TopHit)	124
Lithuania (AGATA)	73
Lithuania Airplay (TopHit)	6
Russia Airplay (TopHit)	88
Switzerland (Schweizer Hitparade)	71
US Hot Dance/Electronic Songs (Billboard)	5

==== Monthly charts ====
Monthly chart performance for "Just the Way You Are" (Mall Grab remix)
Chart (2026)	Peak position
Estonia Airplay (TopHit)	41
Lithuania Airplay (TopHit)	4

=== Pnau remix ===
==== Weekly charts ====
Weekly chart performance for "Just the Way You Are" (Pnau remix)
Chart (2026)	Peak position
Lithuania Airplay (TopHit)	27

==== Monthly charts ====
Monthly chart performance for "Just the Way You Are" (Pnau remix)
Chart (2026)	Peak position
Lithuania Airplay (TopHit)	28

=== David Guetta remix ===
==== Weekly charts ====
Weekly chart performance for "Just the Way You Are" (David Guetta remix)
Chart (2026)	Peak position
Estonia Airplay (TopHit)	14
Lithuania Airplay (TopHit)	21
Poland (Polish Airplay Top 100)	11

==== Monthly charts ====
Monthly chart performance for "Just the Way You Are" (David Guetta remix)
Chart (2026)	Peak position
Estonia Airplay (TopHit)	16
Lithuania Airplay (TopHit)	35
Paraguay Airplay (SGP)	93

== Certifications ==
Certifications for "Just the Way You Are"
Region	Certification	Certified units/sales
Belgium (BRMA) Mall Grab remix	Gold	20,000^{‡}
Canada (Music Canada)	Gold	40,000^{‡}
New Zealand (RMNZ)	Gold	15,000^{‡}
United Kingdom (BPI)	Platinum	600,000^{‡}
United States (RIAA)	Gold	500,000^{‡}
^{‡} Sales+streaming figures based on certification alone.

== Release history ==
Release dates and formats for "Just the Way You Are"
Region	Date	Format(s)	Label(s)	Ref(s).
United Kingdom	19 August 2002	12-inch vinyl; CD; cassette	Multiply	
Italy	20 September 2002	12-inch vinyl; maxi-CD	Motivo	
Australia	14 October 2002	Maxi-CD	Motivo	
United States	23 June 2003	Rhythmic contemporary radio	Robbins Entertainment	
