= Five discography =

- Studio albums: 4
- Compilation albums: 4
- Singles: 13
- Video albums: 3
- Music videos: 14

The discography of English boy band Five consists of four studio albums, four compilation albums, fourteen singles, fourteen music videos and three video albums. Five's debut album, Five, was released by RCA Records in the United Kingdom in June 1998 and peaked at number one on the UK Albums Chart and has been certified double platinum by the British Phonographic Industry (BPI). The first single from the album, "Slam Dunk (Da Funk)", peaked at number ten on the UK Singles Chart and within the top thirty across most of Europe. Follow-up single, "When the Lights Go Out", was more successful, peaking at number four in the UK, number two in Australia and number ten on the Billboard Hot 100 in the United States. Other singles released from the album, "Got the Feelin'", "Everybody Get Up", and "Until the Time Is Through" all peaked within the top three in the UK and Ireland, and all three have been certified silver by the BPI.

In November 1999, Five released their second album, Invincible, which reached number four in the UK and was certified two times platinum by the BPI. The first single, "If Ya Gettin' Down", became their third in a row to peak at number two in the UK. This was followed by their first UK number-one single, "Keep On Movin'". "Don't Wanna Let You Go" came next and peaked at nine in the UK. In March 2000, Five opened at the BRIT Awards with rock legends Queen, performing an updated version of that Queen's hit, "We Will Rock You" which was later released as a single and it became their second UK number one in July 2000. Third album Kingsize came in August 2001 and contained "Let's Dance", which became Five's third UK number-one single. The album later peaked at number three. The band decided to disband a few weeks later on 27 September 2001. The band's final single, "Closer to Me", was released as a double a-side with "Rock the Party" in the UK and Ireland and reached numbers four and twelve respectively. A Greatest Hits album followed in November.

In September 2006, it was announced the four of the original Five members, without Sean Conlon, would be reforming and they started recording material for the band's fourth album and also planned a tour for summer 2007. However, on 19 May 2007, only eight months after reforming, having failed to secure a lucrative enough record deal, Five announced via their official website that they will no longer be pursuing a comeback. In 2012, it was announced that Five would again be reforming, this time with Conlon, but without J Brown who later pulled out of the reunion and in August 2014, Abz Love left the band due to creative differences.

In 2021, Five confirmed the release of their first album in 20 years Time, which was released on 28 January the following year.

== Albums ==
=== Studio albums ===
List of albums, with selected chart positions and certifications
Title	Album details	Peak chart positions										Certifications
Title	Album details	UK	AUS	BEL	GER	IRE	NL	NZ	SWE	SWI	US	Certifications
Five	Released: 22 June 1998; Label: RCA; Format: CD, cassette	1	8	1	—	3	2	1	6	—	27	BPI: 2× Platinum; ARIA: 3× Platinum; CRIA: Gold; NVPI: Gold; IFPI SWE: Platinum; RIAA: Platinum
Invincible	Released: 8 November 1999; Label: RCA; Format: CD, cassette	4	5	6	27	7	2	16	12	33	108	BPI: 2× Platinum; ARIA: 3× Platinum; CRIA: Gold; NVPI: Gold; IFPI SWE: Gold
Kingsize	Released: 27 August 2001; Label: RCA; Formats: CD, cassette	3	21	7	59	13	27	16	41	62	—	BPI: Gold; ARIA: Gold
Time	Released: 28 January 2022; Label: Five; Formats: Digital, streaming	—	—	—	—	—	—	—	—	—	—	
"—" denotes releases that did not chart or were not released in that territory.

=== Compilation albums ===
List of albums, with selected chart positions and certifications
Title	Album details	Peak chart positions				Certifications
Title	Album details	UK	AUS	IRE	NZ	Certifications
Greatest Hits	Released: 19 November 2001; Label: RCA; Formats: CD, cassette	9	76	29	35	BPI: Platinum
Let's Dance	Released: 20 March 2002; Label: RCA; Formats: CD, cassette	—	—	—	—	
Fan Favorites	Released: 27 February 2007 (US only); Label: Sony Music; Formats: CD	—N/a				
Keep On Movin': The Best of Five	Released: 19 February 2016; Label: Music Club Deluxe; Formats: 2×CD, digital	—	—	—	—	
"—" denotes releases that did not chart or were not released in that territory.

=== Video albums ===
List of albums
Title	Album details	Certifications
Five Inside	Released: 9 November 1998; Label: Sony BMG; Format: VHS	US: Gold; BPI: Platinum
Five: Live	Released: 6 November 2000; Label: Sony BMG; Formats: VHS, DVD	BPI: Gold
The Greatest Hits	Released: 19 November 2001; Label: Sony BMG; Formats: VHS	

== Singles ==
=== As main artist ===
List of singles, with selected chart positions and certifications
Title	Year	Peak chart positions										Certifications	Album
Title	Year	UK	AUS	BEL	GER	IRE	NL	NZ	SWE	SWI	US	Certifications	Album
"Slam Dunk (Da Funk)"	1997	10	—	6	77	24	10	22	28	—	86	BPI: Silver	Five
"When the Lights Go Out"	1998	4	2	13	—	11	32	20	7	—	10	BPI: Silver; ARIA: Platinum; RIAA: Gold	Five
"Got the Feelin'"	1998	3	6	2	86	4	4	2	12	—	—	BPI: Gold; ARIA: Gold	Five
"Everybody Get Up"	1998	2	5	22	25	4	9	1	5	24	—	BPI: Gold; ARIA: Platinum; IFPI SWE: Gold	Five
"It's the Things You Do"	1998	—	—	—	—	—	—	—	—	—	53		Five
"Until the Time Is Through"	1998	2	8	26	—	3	15	14	11	—	—	BPI: Silver; IFPI SWE: Gold	Five
"If Ya Gettin' Down"	1999	2	2	6	17	4	6	1	6	12	—	BPI: Gold; ARIA: Platinum; IFPI SWE: Gold	Invincible
"Keep On Movin'"	1999	1	6	6	21	2	3	7	10	36	—	BPI: 2× Platinum; ARIA: Platinum; IFPI SWE: Gold; RMNZ: Platinum	Invincible
"Don't Wanna Let You Go"	2000	9	17	37	81	11	13	5	22	69	—		Invincible
"We Will Rock You" (with Queen)	2000	1	3	17	8	6	20	29	35	18	—	BPI: Silver; ARIA: Platinum	Invincible
"Let's Dance"	2001	1	3	8	54	2	22	11	20	77	—	BPI: Silver; ARIA: Gold	Kingsize
"Closer to Me"	2001	4	55 (Note: "Closer to Me" and "Rock the Party" were released as a double A-side single in Australia and New Zealand.)	38	—	12	71	44	—	—	—		Kingsize
"Rock the Party"	2001	—	55	— (Note: "Rock the Party" did not enter the Belgian Ultratop 50, but peaked at number two on the Ultratip chart.)	—	—	—	44	—	—	—		Kingsize
"—" denotes a release that did not chart or was not released

=== As featured artist ===
List of singles, with selected chart positions
Title	Year	Peak chart positions		Album
Title	Year	UK	IRE	Album
"I Wish It Could Be Christmas Everyday" (among The Big Reunion cast)	2013	21	82	Non-album single

=== Promotional singles ===
List of singles
Title	Year	Album
"How Do Ya Feel"	1999	Invincible
"Shangri-La"	2021	Time
"Making Me Fall"	2021	Time
"Reset"	2021	Time
"Warm Light"	2021	Time
"Time"	2021	Time

== Music videos ==
Year	Song	Director(s)
1997	"Slam Dunk (Da Funk)"	Lawrence Watson
1998	"When the Lights Go Out" (UK version)	Liam & Grant
1998	"When the Lights Go Out" (US version)	Nigel Dick
1998	"Got the Feelin'"	Max & Dania
1998	"Everybody Get Up"	Max & Dania
1999	"It's the Things You Do" (US version)	Nigel Dick
1999	"Until the Time Is Through"	Max & Dania
1999	"If Ya Gettin' Down"	Cameron Casey
1999	"Keep On Movin'"	Cameron Casey
2000	"Don't Wanna Let You Go"	Cameron Casey
2000	"We Will Rock You" (with Queen)	Tim Royes
2001	"Let's Dance"	Max & Dania
2001	"Closer to Me"	Max & Dania
2001	"Rock the Party"	Sean Smith (Animation)
