= Greatest Hits (Five album) =

Compilation album by Five
- Released: 19 November 2001
- Recorded: 1997–2001
- Genres: Pop; rap; dance; teen pop; funk; power pop
- Length: 70:04
- Label: RCA
- Producers: Simon Cowell (exec.); Julian Gallagher; Richard "Biff" Stannard; Ash Howes; Steve Mac; Stargate; Eliot Kennedy; Max Martin; Denniz Pop

Five chronology
Kingsize (2001)	Greatest Hits (2001)	Time (2022)

Greatest Hits is the first compilation album by English boy band Five. It was released in the United Kingdom through RCA Records on 19 November 2001, just three months after the release of their third studio album, Kingsize.

The album features thirteen of the band's fifteen singles (excluding "How Do Ya Feel" and "Don't Fight It Baby"), as well as two popular B-sides, two new remixes, and the previously unreleased "Set Me Free", which was recorded during the Kingsize album sessions. The album peaked at number nine on the UK Albums Chart, as well as being certified platinum by the BPI.

== Background ==
Although the band's previous album, Kingsize, had been released only three months earlier, Greatest Hits was rush-released due to the imminent split of the band. Scott Robinson revealed on the ITV2 series The Big Reunion that the album's release came after Sean Conlon suffered a mental breakdown and threatened to quit the band as he was unable to cope. Alongside the release of the album, a VHS compilation containing all of the band's music videos, as well as behind the scenes footage, and a live video for "Two Sides to Every Story".

Two singles, "Closer to Me" and "Rock the Party", were released to promote the album. The latter was not released as a single in its own right in the United Kingdom, but formed a double A-side on CD2 of "Closer to Me". Both songs originated from Kingsize.

The Japanese version of the album replaced the B-side "Inspector Gadget" with the promotional single "How Do Ya Feel" and added a remix of "Let's Dance". The album was re-released on 7 June 2003. The album made a return to the top ten of UK Albums Chart in 2013 following the band's reformation on The Big Reunion.

== Track listing ==
International edition
No.	Title	Writer(s)	Original album	Length
1.	"We Will Rock You" (radio edit)	Richard Breen; Jason Brown; Brian May	Invincible (1999)	3:09
2.	"Keep On Movin'"	Breen; Brown; Sean Conlon; Julian Gallagher; Richard "Biff" Stannard	Invincible	3:17
3.	"If Ya Gettin' Down"	Breen; Brown; Mike Cleveland; Conlon; Gallagher; Stannard	Invincible	3:00
4.	"Everybody Get Up" (radio edit)	Breen; Brown; Conlon; Herbie Crichlow; Jake Hooker; Alan Merrill; Ritchie Neville; Scott Robinson	Five (1998)	3:05
5.	"Let's Dance" (radio edit)	Breen; Brown; Conlon; Gallagher; Martin Harrington; Ash Howes; Stannard	Kingsize (2001)	3:38
6.	"Rock the Party" (single remix)	Breen; Brown; Conlon; Barry Gibb; Gallagher; Stannard	Kingsize	2:49
7.	"Got the Feelin'" (radio edit)	Breen; Brown; Conlon; Gallagher; Stannard	Five	3:29
8.	"When the Lights Go Out" (international radio edit)	Breen; Brown; Conlon; Eliot Kennedy; Tim Lever; John McClaughlin; Neville; Mike Percy; Robinson	Five	4:11
9.	"Closer to Me" (single remix)	Breen; Brown; Gallagher; Harrington; Howes; Stannard	Kingsize	4:30
10.	"Until the Time Is Through" (radio edit)	Max Martin; Andreas Carlsson	Five	4:10
11.	"Don't Wanna Let You Go" (radio edit)	Breen; Brown; Conlon; Gallagher; Stannard	Invincible	3:37
12.	"Slam Dunk (Da Funk)" (radio edit)	Crichlow; Martin; Denniz Pop; Jake Schulze	Five	3:36
13.	"It's the Things You Do" (international album version)	Breen; Brown; Conlon; Crichlow; Martin; Neville; Robinson; George Shahin	Five	3:37
14.	"When I Remember When"	Shelly Peiken; Jud Friedman	Five (US version) (Note: In the UK, "When I Remember When" was first released as a B-side to "If Ya Gettin' Down".)	3:59
15.	"Inspector Gadget"	Breen; Brown; Gallagher; Steve Lewinson; Richard Norris; Stannard	Invincible (Note: "Inspector Gadget" was first released as a B-side to "Keep On Movin'" but appeared on Invincible as a hidden track.)	2:51
16.	"Set Me Free"	Mikkel S. Eriksen; Tor Erik Hermansen; Neville; Robinson; Hallgeir Rustan	previously unreleased	2:55
17.	"Keep On Movin'" (2002 FIFA World Cup remix)	Breen; Brown; Conlon; Gallagher; Stannard	previously unreleased	3:40
18.	"Five Greatest Hits Megamix" (Jewels & Stone remix)	Breen; Brown; Carlsson; Cleveland; Conlon; Crichlow; Gallagher; Gibb; Harrington; Hooker; Howes; Kennedy; Lever; Martin; May; McClaughlin; Merrill; Neville; Percy; Pop; Robinson; Schulze; Stannard	previously unreleased	11:00

Japanese edition
No.	Title	Writer(s)	Original album	Length
15.	"How Do Ya Feel"	Breen; Brown; Conlon; Gallagher; Stannard	Invincible	3:40
19.	"Let's Dance" (The Kinkyboy remix)	Breen; Brown; Conlon; Gallagher; Harrington; Howes; Stannard	"Let's Dance" single (2001)	6:40

== Personnel ==
- Lead vocals: Abz Love, Jason "J" Brown, Sean Conlon, Ritchie Neville, Scott Robinson
- Executive producers: Simon Cowell, Denniz Pop
- Producers: Julian Gallagher, Richard "Biff" Stannard, Brian May, Steve Mac, Denniz Pop, Jay-Kee, Eliot Kennedy, Mike Percy, Tim Lever, Kristian Lundin, Max Martin, StarGate
- Remixers: Cutfather & Joe, Steve Mac, StarGate, Jewels & Stone
- Mixing: Ash Howes, StarGate, Ben Chapman
- Engineers: Ben Chapman, Matt Howe, Daniel Pursey, Robin Sellers, Ben Coombs
- Programming: Ash Howes, Martin Harrington
- Arrangers: Julian Gallagher, Richard Stannard, Dave Arch
- Backing vocals: Andy Caine, Richard Stannard, Sharon Murphy, Eliot Kennedy, Tim Woodcock

== Charts ==
=== Weekly charts ===
Chart (2001)	Peak position
Australian Albums (ARIA Charts)	76
Belgian Albums (Ultratop Flanders)	16
Dutch Albums (Album Top 100)	92
European Albums Chart	48
German Albums (Offizielle Top 100)	78
Irish Albums (IRMA)	29
Italian Albums (FIMI)	77
New Zealand Albums (RMNZ)	35
Scottish Albums Chart (OCC)	11
Swedish Albums (Sverigetopplistan)	42
Swiss Albums (Schweizer Hitparade)	37
UK Albums (Official Charts)	9

Chart (2025)	Peak position
Scottish Albums (OCC)	76
UK Albums (OCC)	94
UK Album Sales (OCC)	50
UK Album Downloads Chart (OCC)	10
UK Physical Albums (OCC)	49

=== Year-end charts ===
Chart (2001)	Position
UK Albums (OCC)	61

== Certifications and sales ==
Region	Certification	Certified units/sales
United Kingdom (BPI)	Platinum	300,000^{^}
^{^} Shipments figures based on certification alone.
