= Loud and Intimate Tour =

2015 concert tour by Five

The Loud and Intimate Tour was a 2015 concert tour by British boy band Five. Following their comeback success on The Big Reunion and the 5ive Greatest Hits Tour, the band played at theatre venues around England, performing selections from their back catalogue. This is the band's first full concert tour without former founding member Abz Love, thus making it their first as a trio.

== Setlist ==
1. "Let's Dance"
2. "Slam Dunk Da Funk"
3. "Until the Time Is Through"
4. "It's the Things You Do"
5. "Got the Feelin'"
6. "Lay All Your Loving On Me"
7. "Human" (acoustic)
8. "When the Lights Go Out" (acoustic)
9. "Battlestar"
10. "Rock the Party"
11. "Don't Wanna Let You Go"
12. "How Do Ya Feel"

Acoustic Medley:

13. "Satisfied"
14. "Invincible"
15. "Serious"
16. "Everybody Get Up"
17. "Something in the Air"
18. "Get Lucky" (Daft Punk cover)
19. "Got the Feelin'"
20. "Place Your Hands" (Reef cover)
21. "Take Your Chances on Me"
22. "Dancing in the Moonlight" (Toploader cover)
23. "Keep on Movin' / Lips Are Movin (Meghan Trainor cover)"
24. "C'mon C'mon"

Encore

25. "When the Lights Go Out" (full version)
26. "Everybody Get Up" (full version)
27. "If Ya Gettin' Down"
28. "We Will Rock You" (Queen cover)
29. "Keep on Movin'"

== Tour Dates ==
Date	City	Country	Venue
16 April 2015	Bristol	England	O2 Bristol
17 April 2015	Middlesbrough	England	The Venue
18 April 2015	Glasgow	Scotland	O2 ABC
19 April 2015	Leeds	England	O2 Academy Leeds
21 April 2015	Manchester	England	Manchester Ritz
22 April 2015	Liverpool	England	O2 Academy Liverpool
23 April 2015	Birmingham	England	Birmingham Institute
24 April 2015	London	England	O2 Shepherd's Bush Empire

== Personnel ==
- Sean Conlon (vocals)
- Ritchie Neville (vocals)
- Scott Robinson (vocals)
