= Invincible (Five album) =

Studio album by Five
- Released: 8 November 1999
- Recorded: 1998–1999
- Genres: Pop; hip hop; R&B; dance-pop; teen pop
- Length: 53:13
- Label: RCA
- Producers: Julian Gallagher; Steve Mac; Per Magnusson; Richard Norris; Jake Schulze; Richard "Biff" Stannard; Stargate

Five chronology
Five (1998)	Invincible (1999)	Kingsize (2001)

Singles from Invincible
- 1. "If Ya Gettin' Down" Released: 19 July 1999; 2. "Keep on Movin'" Released: 25 October 1999; 3. "Don't Wanna Let You Go" Released: 6 March 2000; 4. "We Will Rock You" Released: 17 July 2000; 5. "Two Sides to Every Story" Released: October 2000 (radio single, only Latin America)

Invincible is the second studio album released by English boy band Five. The album was released in the United Kingdom by RCA Records on 8 November 1999, and was later released in the United States on 16 May 2000. The album was executively produced by Simon Cowell and Richard "Biff" Stannard.

Four singles were released from Invincible, including the UK chart-toppers "Keep on Movin'" and "We Will Rock You". During their performance at Rock in Rio 2001, group member Scott Robinson stated that the title track "Invincible" was intended to be released as a single, but they decided against it as they were working on their third album.

The album reached number four on the UK Albums Chart, the lowest-charting original album by the band, although it went on to become their biggest seller in UK, being certified double platinum.

== Background ==
The original version of the album, released in November 1999, contains a total of fifteen tracks, including the hidden track, "Inspector Gadget". It also contains the original album version of "We Will Rock You". A limited-edition version of the standard album, containing an exclusive photo booklet, birthday calendar and free poster was also made available in certain countries in Europe.

For the album's release stateside in May 2000, the track listing was revised, removing "Mr. Z", "Sunshine" and "Battlestar", remixing "Don't Wanna Let You Go", and adding the track "Don't Fight It Baby", originally contributed by the band for the soundtrack to the film Loser.

The Japanese edition of the album retains the original track listing, but includes the B-side recording "Reminiscing" as a bonus track, and an enhanced section, containing two videos. A special edition of the album was later released in November 2000, featuring a bonus disc, containing five tracks recorded at the Manchester Evening News Arena during the band's Invincible Tour on 26 March 2000. Disc one was also altered, replacing the original version of "We Will Rock You" with the single mix, adding "Don't Fight It Baby" and a remix of "Keep on Movin'" as bonus tracks, and including an enhanced section, containing four music videos.

== Critical reception ==
Professional ratings
Review scores
Source	Rating
AllMusic	4.5/5 stars
BBC News	Unfavorable

Peter Fawthrop, from AllMusic, stated that the album is "dizzying, fun, danceable, and all-around glowing." He noted that the group projects a youthful energy, drawing in listeners with their cocky humor and ambition, but also pointed out the "sophomoric lyrics" and sexual themes, which may not resonate with their teenage audience. Fawthrop highlighted the standout tracks "You Make Me a Better Man" and "Mr. Z," praising the latter for its witty and humorous approach. Despite some weaker tracks, he concluded that the album shows the group has potential.

Chris Charles, from BBC News, stated that Invincible by Five starts strong with the infectious track "If Ya Gettin' Down," but quickly falls into typical boy band territory. He criticized songs like "Don't Wanna Let You Go" for trying to sound tough but failing, while the album is largely filled with "sugary nonsense" ballads. Although tracks like "Mr Z" show potential with commendable rapping, Charles argues that Five often revert to clichés, and if they want to be taken seriously, they need to move away from these cheesy lyrics.

== Chart performance ==
The album reached number four on the UK Albums Chart, the lowest-charting original album by the band, although it went on to become their biggest seller, being certified double platinum. The album also peaked at number 108 on the US Billboard 200.

== Track listing ==
All tracks are produced by Julian Gallagher and Richard Stannard except where noted.

UK edition
No.	Title	Writer(s)	Producer(s)	Length
1.	"If Ya Gettin' Down" (lead vocals: Brown, Breen)	Richard Breen; Jason Brown; Michael Cleveland; Sean Conlon; Julian Gallagher; Richard Stannard		3:00
2.	"Keep on Movin'" (lead vocals: Conlon, Brown, Breen)	Breen; Brown; Conlon; Gallagher; Stannard	Gallagher; Stannard; Steve Mac^{[a]}	3:17
3.	"Don't Wanna Let You Go" (lead vocals: Robinson, Brown, Neville)	Breen; Brown; Conlon; Gallagher; Stannard	Gallagher; Stannard; Stargate^{[b]}	3:23
4.	"We Will Rock You" (lead vocals: Brown, Neville, Breen)	Breen; Brown; Brian May	Gallagher; Richard Norris; Stannard	2:56
5.	"Two Sides to Every Story" (lead vocals: Robinson, Neville)	Mikkel S. Eriksen; Tor Erik Hermansen; Ritchie Neville; Scott Robinson; Hallgeir Rustan	Stargate	3:27
6.	"You Make Me a Better Man" (lead vocals: Robinson, Neville)	Eriksen; Hermansen; Neville; Robinson; Rustan	Stargate	4:18
7.	"Invincible" (lead vocals: Robinson, Neville)	Brown; Conlon; Gallagher; Stannard		4:11
8.	"It's Alright" (lead vocals: Neville, Robinson, Brown)	Brown; Gallagher; Neville; Robinson; Stannard		4:17
9.	"Serious" (lead vocals: Brown, Breen, Robinson)	Breen; Brown; Andreas Carlsson; Per Magnusson; Jake Schulze	Magnusson; Schulze	3:23
10.	"How Do Ya Feel" (lead vocals: Brown, Breen, Neville)	Breen; Brown; Conlon; Gallagher; Neville; Robinson; Stannard		3:30
11.	"Everyday" (lead vocals: Neville, Brown, Robinson, Breen)	Breen; Brown; Conlon; Gallagher; Stannard		4:19
12.	"Mr. Z" (lead vocals: Breen, Brown)	Breen; Brown; Conlon; Gallagher; Norris; Stannard	Gallagher; Norris; Stannard	2:50
13.	"Sunshine" (lead vocals: Breen, Conlon, Brown)	Breen; Brown; Conlon; Gallagher; Stannard		3:24
14.	"Battlestar" (lead vocals: Breen, Brown)	Breen; Brown; Gallagher; Glen A. Larson; Norris; Stu Phillips; Stannard	Gallagher; Norris; Stannard	4:07
15.	"Inspector Gadget" (hidden track) (lead vocals: Breen, Brown, Conlon)	Breen; Brown; Gallagher; Shuki Levy; Steve Lewinson; Norris; Haim Saban; Stannard		2:50
Total length:				53:13

Japanese edition bonus tracks
No.	Title	Writer(s)	Length
16.	"Reminiscing" (lead vocals: Breen, Conlon, Brown)	Breen; Brown; Conlon; Gallagher; Norris; Stannard	3:36
17.	"If Ya Gettin' Down" (video)	Breen; Brown; Cleveland; Conlon; Gallagher; Stannard	3:15
18.	"Keep on Movin'" (video)	Breen; Brown; Conlon; Gallagher; Stannard	3:11

Deluxe edition
No.	Title	Writer(s)	Producer(s)	Length
1.	"If Ya Gettin' Down"	Breen; Brown; Cleveland; Conlon; Gallagher; Stannard		3:00
2.	"Keep on Movin'"	Breen; Brown; Conlon; Gallagher; Stannard	Gallagher; Stannard; Mac^{[a]}	3:17
3.	"Don't Wanna Let You Go"	Breen; Brown; Conlon; Gallagher; Stannard	Gallagher; Stannard; Stargate^{[b]}	3:23
4.	"We Will Rock You" (single mix)	Breen; Brown; May	Gallagher; Norris; Stannard	3:08
5.	"Two Sides to Every Story"	Eriksen; Hermansen; Neville; Robinson; Rustan	Stargate	3:27
6.	"You Make Me a Better Man"	Eriksen; Hermansen; Neville; Robinson; Rustan	Stargate	4:18
7.	"Invincible"	Brown; Conlon; Gallagher; Stannard		4:11
8.	"It's Alright"	Brown; Gallagher; Neville; Robinson; Stannard		4:17
9.	"Serious"	Breen; Brown; Carlsson; Magnusson; Schulze	Magnusson; Schulze	3:23
10.	"How Do Ya Feel"	Breen; Brown; Conlon; Gallagher; Neville; Robinson; Stannard		3:30
11.	"Everyday"	Breen; Brown; Conlon; Gallagher; Stannard		4:19
12.	"Mr. Z"	Breen; Brown; Conlon; Gallagher; Norris; Stannard	Gallagher; Norris; Stannard	2:50
13.	"Sunshine"	Breen; Brown; Conlon; Gallagher; Stannard		3:24
14.	"Battlestar"	Breen; Brown; Gallagher; Larson; Norris; Phillips; Stannard	Gallagher; Norris; Stannard	4:07
15.	"Don't Fight It Baby" (lead vocals: Robinson, Neville, Brown)	Wayne Hector; Mac; Ali Tennant	Mac	3:04
16.	"Keep on Movin'" (the Five-A-Side mix)	Breen; Brown; Conlon; Gallagher; Stannard	Gallagher; Stannard; Mac^{[a]}	3:32
17.	"Inspector Gadget" (hidden track)	Breen; Brown; Gallagher; Levy; Lewinson; Norris; Saban; Stannard		2:50
Total length:				60:02

Deluxe edition bonus disc: "Five: Live at the MEN, June 2000"
No.	Title	Writer(s)	Length
1.	"If Ya Gettin' Down"	Breen; Brown; Cleveland; Conlon; Gallagher; Stannard	3:05
2.	"Keep on Movin'"	Breen; Brown; Conlon; Gallagher; Stannard	3:40
3.	"Don't Wanna Let You Go"	Breen; Brown; Conlon; Gallagher; Stannard	2:49
4.	"Everybody Get Up"	Breen; Brown; Conlon; Herbie Crichlow; Jake Hooker; Neville; Robinson	3:22
5.	"Got the Feelin'"	Breen; Brown; Conlon; Gallagher; Stannard	3:31
6.	"Keep on Movin'" (live video)	Breen; Brown; Conlon; Gallagher; Stannard
7.	"We Will Rock You" (music video)	Breen; Brown; May
8.	"Don't Wanna Let You Go" (music video)	Breen; Brown; Conlon; Gallagher; Stannard
9.	"If Ya Gettin' Down" (music video)	Breen; Brown; Conlon; Gallagher; Stannard
Total length:			15:27

US edition
No.	Title	Writer(s)	Producer(s)	Length
1.	"Don't Fight It Baby"	Mac; Hector; Tennant	Mac	3:04
2.	"If Ya Gettin' Down"	Breen; Brown; Cleveland; Conlon; Gallagher; Stannard		3:00
3.	"Don't Wanna Let You Go" (single edit)	Breen; Brown; Conlon; Gallagher; Stannard	Gallagher; Stannard; Stargate^{[b]}	2:57
4.	"Two Sides to Every Story"	Eriksen; Hermansen; Neville; Robinson; Rustan	Stargate	3:27
5.	"Keep on Movin'"	Breen; Brown; Conlon; Gallagher; Stannard	Gallagher; Stannard; Mac^{[a]}	3:17
6.	"We Will Rock You" (original album version)	Breen; Brown; May	Gallagher; Norris; Stannard	2:56
7.	"You Make Me a Better Man"	Eriksen; Hermansen; Neville; Robinson; Rustan	Stargate	4:18
8.	"It's Alright"	Breen; Brown; Conlon; Gallagher; Stannard		4:17
9.	"Serious"	Breen; Brown; Carlsson; Magnusson; Schulze	Magnusson; Schulze	3:23
10.	"Invincible"	Breen; Brown; Conlon; Gallagher; Stannard		4:11
11.	"How Do Ya Feel"	Breen; Brown; Conlon; Gallagher; Neville; Robinson; Stannard		3:30
12.	"Everyday"	Breen; Brown; Conlon; Gallagher; Stannard		4:19
Total length:				53:13

Notes

- ^{^[a]} signifies an additional producer
- ^{^[b]} signifies a remixer
- "If Ya Gettin' Down" includes a sample from "Last Night a D.J. Saved My Life", performed by Indeep
- "Battlestar" includes a sample of "Battlestar Galactica", performed by John Williams and The Boston Pops Orchestra

== Personnel ==
Five

- Jason "J" Brown – vocals; Rhodes piano on track 13
- Sean Conlon – vocals; piano on track 7
- Richard Abidin "Abs" Breen – vocals
- Ritchie Neville – vocals
- Scott Robinson – vocals

Additional musicians

- Mista Dexter – turntables on tracks 1, 2, 4, 8, 10, 11, 12 and 14
- Filo – backing vocals on tracks 1, 2, 4, 7, 10, 11 and 13
- John Themis – guitar on tracks 2, 7, 8 and 13
- Steve Lewinson – bass on tracks 2, 7, 8 and 55
- Chris Laws – drums on track 2
- Steve McCutcheon – keyboards on track 2
- Sharon Murphy – backing vocals on track 2
- Brian May – guitar on tracks 4 and 22
- Roger Taylor – drums on track 22
- Andy Caine – backing vocals on track 4
- Mikkel Storleer Eriksen – additional vocals on track 5
- Mats Berntoft – guitar on track 9
- Sead – turntables on track 9
- Anders Von Hofsten – backing vocals on track 9
- Andreas Carlsson – backing vocals on track 9
- Snake Davis – flute on track 11
- Maren Hernandez – additional vocals on track 15
- Wayne Hector – backing vocals on track 15
- Alistair Tennant – backing vocals on track 15
- Jonathan Pearce – commentary on track 16

Production and additional personnel

- Simon Cowell – executive production
- Richard "Biff" Stannard – executive production; production on all tracks except 5, 6 and 9; mixing on track 10
- Julian Gallagher– production on all tracks except 5, 6 and 9; mixing on track 10
- Richard Norris – production on tracks 4, 12 and 14
- Stargate – production on tracks 5 and 6; remix and additional production on track 3
- Steve Mac – production, mixing and arrangements on track 15; additional production and additional mixing on tracks 2 and 16
- Jake – production, recording, keyboards and programming on track 9
- Per Magnusson – production, recording, keyboards and programming on track 9
- Adrian Bushby – recording and mixing on all tracks except 5, 6, 9 and 10; mix engineering on track 10
- Jake Davies – Pro Tools engineering on tracks 2, 3, 4, 7, 8, 12, 13, 14 and 55; mixing on tracks 2 and 16; additional arrangements on track 12
- Matt Howe – mix engineering on tracks 2, 15 and 16
- Chris Laws – engineering and programming on track 15; additional programming on tracks 2 and 16
- Daniel Pursey – engineering assistance on track 2; mix engineering assistance on tracks 15 and 16
- Justin Shirley-Smith – recording on track 4
- Matt Sime – vocal recording on track 10
- Alvin Sweeney – recording assistance on tracks 2, 3, 7, 8, 14 and 55; mixing assistance on track 16
- Conal Markey – recording on track 10; recording assistance on tracks 1, 2 and 11; mixing assistance on track 16
- Dave Morgan – recording assistance on tracks 7, 12 and 14
- Pat McGovern – recording assistance on tracks 1 and 11
- Steve McKeown – string arrangements on track 7
- Paul West – art direction, graphic design
- Paula Benson – art direction, graphic design
- Valerie Phillips – photography

== Charts ==
=== Weekly charts ===
Chart (1999–2000)	Peak position
Australian Albums (ARIA)	5
Australian Dance Albums (ARIA)	1
Belgian Albums (Ultratop Flanders)	6
Belgian Albums (Ultratop Wallonia)	13
Canadian Albums (RPM)	49
Danish Albums (Tracklisten)	20
Dutch Albums (Album Top 100)	2
Estonian Albums (Eesti Top 10)	4
European Albums Chart	10
Finnish Albums (Suomen virallinen lista)	18
German Albums (Offizielle Top 100)	27
Greek Albums (IFPI)	3
Hungarian Albums (MAHASZ)	5
Icelandic Albums (Tónlist)	9
Irish Albums (IRMA)	5
Italian Albums (FIMI)	10
Italian Albums (Musica e Dischi)	11
New Zealand Albums (RMNZ)	16
Norwegian Albums (VG-lista)	28
Scottish Albums (Official Charts)	9
Spanish Albums (PROMUSICAE)	45
Swedish Albums (Sverigetopplistan)	12
Swiss Albums (Schweizer Hitparade)	33
UK Albums (Official Charts)	4
US Billboard 200	108

=== Year-end charts ===
Chart (1999)	Position
Australian Album (ARIA)	41
Belgian Albums Chart (Ultratop Flanders)	48
Belgian Albums (Ultratop Wallonia)	91
Dutch Albums (Album Top 100)	61
Italian Albums (FIMI)	58
Swedish Albums (Sverigetopplistan)	71
UK Albums (OCC)	27
Chart (2000)	Position
Australian Albums (ARIA)	65
Belgian Albums (Ultratop Flanders)	40
Canadian Albums (Neilsen SoundScan)	148
Dutch Albums (Album Top 100)	73
European Albums (Eurochart Hot 100)	85
UK Albums (OCC)	54

== Certifications and sales ==
Region	Certification	Certified units/sales
Argentina (CAPIF)	Gold	30,000^{^}
Australia (ARIA)	3× Platinum	210,000^{^}
Belgium (BRMA)	Platinum	50,000^{*}
Brazil (Pro-Música Brasil)	Gold	100,000
Canada (Music Canada)	Gold	50,000^{^}
Finland	—	13,150
Hungary (MAHASZ)	Gold	
Mexico (AMPROFON)	Gold	75,000^{^}
Netherlands (NVPI)	Gold	50,000^{^}
New Zealand (RMNZ)	Platinum	15,000^{^}
Sweden (GLF)	Gold	40,000^{^}
United Kingdom (BPI)	2× Platinum	642,243
United States	—	96,000
Summaries
Europe (IFPI)	Platinum	1,000,000^{*}
^{*} Sales figures based on certification alone.^{^} Shipments figures based on certification alone.

== Invincible Tour ==
The Invincible Tour was a 2000 concert tour by Five in promotion of the album.

== Background ==
Along with the band's native UK, the tour went to Europe, Australasia and—as a foursome—South America, after member Ritchie Neville contracted chickenpox and had to be flown back to England in order to recover.

== Set list ==
This set list was played at the Manchester EN Arena on 26 March 2000.

1. "Battlestar"
2. "Shake"
3. "Everybody Get Up"
4. "When the Lights Go Out"
5. "It's the Things You Do"
6. "Got the Feelin'"
7. "Until the Time Is Through"
8. "Slam Dunk (Da Funk)"
9. "If Ya Gettin' Down"
10. "Serious"
11. "Two Sides to Every Story"
12. "Don't Wanna Let You Go"
13. "Invincible"
14. "Keep On Movin'"
15. "We Will Rock You" (Encore)

== Tour dates ==
Date	City	Country	Venue
Europe
26 February 2000	Saint Petersburg	Russia	SKK Arena
27 February 2000	Moscow	Russia	Olympiysky Sports
10 March 2000	Glasgow	Scotland	Scottish Exhibition and Conference Centre
11 March 2000	Glasgow	Scotland	Scottish Exhibition and Conference Centre
12 March 2000	Glasgow	Scotland	Scottish Exhibition and Conference Centre
14 March 2000	Cardiff	Wales	Cardiff International Arena
15 March 2000	Cardiff	Wales	Cardiff International Arena
17 March 2000	Dublin	Ireland	Point Theatre
18 March 2000	Dublin	Ireland	Point Theatre
20 March 2000	Manchester	England	MEN Arena
21 March 2000	Birmingham	England	NEC Arena
22 March 2000	Birmingham	England	NEC Arena
24 March 2000	London	England	Wembley Arena
25 March 2000	London	England	Wembley Arena
26 March 2000	Manchester	England	MEN Arena
28 March 2000	Sheffield	England	Sheffield Arena
29 March 2000	Newcastle	England	Newcastle Arena
31 March 2000	Manchester	England	MEN Arena
1 April 2000	London	England	Wembley Arena
2 April 2000	London	England	Wembley Arena
4 April 2000	Cologne	Germany	E Werk
6 April 2000	Rotterdam	Netherlands	Rotterdam Ahoy
7 April 2000	Rotterdam	Netherlands	Rotterdam Ahoy
8 April 2000	Ghent	Belgium	Flanders Expo
9 April 2000	Berlin	Germany	Columbiahalle
11 April 2000	Copenhagen	Denmark	Forum Copenhagen
12 April 2000	Stockholm	Sweden	Stockholm Globe Arena
14 April 2000	Hamburg	Germany	Docks
16 April 2000	Munich	Germany	Zenith
17 April 2000	Milan	Italy	Mediolanum Forum
19 April 2000	Barcelona	Spain	Palau dels Esports de Barcelona
20 April 2000	Madrid	Spain	Palacio de Deportes de la Comunidad de Madrid
Oceania
24 April 2000	Perth	Australia	Perth Entertainment Centre
26 April 2000	Adelaide	Australia	Adelaide Entertainment Centre
28 April 2000	Sydney	Australia	Sydney Superdome
29 April 2000	Melbourne	Australia	Melbourne Park
30 April 2000	Melbourne	Australia	Melbourne Park
2 May 2000	Brisbane	Australia	Brisbane Entertainment Centre
3 May 2000	Newcastle	Australia	Newcastle Entertainment Centre
6 May 2000	Auckland	New Zealand	North Shore Events Centre
7 May 2000	Wellington	New Zealand	Queens Wharf
South America
11 May 2000	Santiago	Chile	Monumental Theatre
13 May 2000	Buenos Aires	Argentina	Ferrocarril Oeste Stadium
15 May 2000	Córdoba	Argentina	Córdoba La Usina
17 May 2000	São Paulo	Brazil	Via Funchal
