= Time (Five album) =

Studio album by Five
- Released: 28 January 2022
- Recorded: 2020–2021
- Genres: Pop; dance-pop
- Producer: Sean Conlon

Five chronology
| Greatest Hits (2001) | Time (2022) |

Time is the fourth studio album by English boy band Five, independently released on 28 January 2022. This is the group's only album to be released as a trio, without members Jason "J" Brown and Abz Love.

== Background and release ==
Time was released in 2022, during a period in which Five had been reduced to three members following Jason "J" Brown's refusal to return to the group for The Big Reunion in 2013, and Abz Love's departure in 2014, with the lineup consisting of Scott Robinson, Ritchie Neville, and Sean Conlon. The album marked the group's return to recording activity, as their previous studio album, Kingsize, had been released by Bertelsmann Music Group (BMG) in 2001. It was preceded by the singles "Making Me Fall" and "Shangri-La", which were released in August 2021. According to Robinson, the group used the period away from live performances to work on new material, which eventually resulted in the album. The title track, "Time", was released on November 26.

The album release and promotion took place during a period when the nostalgia circuit for artists and groups associated with popular music of the late 1990s and early 2000s was in vogue.

== Critical reception ==
Professional ratings
Review scores
| Source | Rating |
|---|---|
| Classic Pop | 2/5 stars |

Classic Pop described Time as "cheaply made", arguing that although it "hints at their pop nous", the album sounds like "promising demos", with "Kick The Wall Down" recalling "Slam Dunk Da Funk" and "Shangri-La" containing "a great light pop song", but concluding that "Sounding like promising demos stops 2022 being Five's time again".

== Track listing ==
All tracks are written by Sean Conlon, Ritchie Neville, and Scott Robinson, except where noted.

Time
| No. | Title | Writer(s) | Length |
|---|---|---|---|
| 1. | "Kick That Wall Down" | | 3:25 |
| 2. | "Making Me Fall" | Sean Conlon; Ritchie Neville; Scott Robinson; Nick Southwood | 3:01 |
| 3. | "Where My Body Goes" | | 3:14 |
| 4. | "Lose Our Minds" | | 2:53 |
| 5. | "Warm Light" | | 3:32 |
| 6. | "Reset" | | 3:25 |
| 7. | "Shangri-La" | | 2:49 |
| 8. | "Lovable Rogue" | | 3:23 |
| 9. | "Dizzy" | | 3:07 |
| 10. | "Written In The Sun" | | 3:10 |
| 11. | "Drive" | | 3:04 |
| 12. | "Time" | | 4:00 |
| 13. | "Keep On Movin" (21 remix) | Richard Breen; Jason Brown; Conlon; Julian Gallagher; Richard Stannard | 3:23 |
| 14. | "Grow" | | 3:29 |
| Total length: | | | 46:55 |
