= Five (Five album) =

Studio album by Five
- Released: 22 June 1998
- Recorded: 1997–1998
- Length: 66:00 (UK version), 45:54 (US version)
- Labels: RCA (international); Arista (US/Canada)
- Producers: Cutfather & Joe; Julian Gallagher; Eliot Kennedy; Tim Laws; Tim Lever; Kristian Lundin; Steve Mac; Max Martin; Denniz Pop (also exec.); Mike Percy; Jake Schulze; Richard Stannard; TTW; Nigel Wright

Five chronology
Five (1998)	Invincible (1999)

Singles from Five
- 1. "Slam Dunk (Da Funk)" Released: 1 December 1997; 2. "When the Lights Go Out" Released: 2 March 1998; 3. "Got the Feelin'" Released: 2 June 1998; 4. "Everybody Get Up" Released: 31 August 1998; 5. "It's The Things You Do" Released: 27 October 1998; 6. "Until the Time Is Through" Released: 16 November 1998

Five is the debut studio album by English boy band Five. It was released in the United Kingdom on 22 June 1998 and charted at number one the UK Albums Chart, becoming the band's only album to do so. The album was later released in the United States on 14 July 1998, where it charted at number 27 on the Billboard 200, making it the most successful album by the band in the region.

Largely produced by Jake Schulze and Denniz Pop – the latter who also served as the executive producer with Simon Cowell – the album spawned six singles, of which all but one reached the top 10 of the UK Singles Chart, the exception – "It's the Things You Do" – having only been released in the United States. On 4 December 1998, the British Phonographic Industry awarded the album a Platinum certification, an accolade later matched by the Recording Industry Association of America. The album has since gone on to earn double platinum status in the UK and sold in excess of 4 million copies worldwide.

== Singles ==
The first single, "Slam Dunk (Da Funk)", was released on 1 December 1997, and peaked at number 10 on the UK Singles Chart. It was also chosen as the new NBA theme song after its release in the United States. The second single, "When the Lights Go Out", was released on 2 March 1998. It peaked at No. 4 in the UK, and also made it to number two in Australia, number seven in Sweden, number ten in the United States and number eleven in Ireland. The third single, "Got the Feelin'", was released on 2 June 1998 and peaked at No. 3 in the UK, number two in New Zealand, number twelve in Sweden, number six in Austria and number four in Ireland and the Netherlands.

The fourth single, "Everybody Get Up", was released on 21 August 1998. It was the album's most successful single, debuting at number one in New Zealand, which gave Five their first ever number-one. The song also made it to number two in the UK, becoming Five's highest-charting song in the UK at the time. Other chart positions included number four in Germany, number nine in the Netherlands and number five in Austria and Sweden. "It's the Things You Do", was released in the United States only, on 27 October 1998. It was unsuccessful, only making it to number 53. The fifth and final single, "Until the Time Is Through", was released on 16 November 1998. It became Five's second UK number-two single, while also making it to number three in Ireland, number eight in Germany, number eleven in Sweden, number 14 in New Zealand and number 15 in the Netherlands.

== Track listing ==
UK Edition
No.	Title	Writer(s)	Producer(s)	Length
1.	"Slam Dunk Da Funk" (lead vocals: Breen, Brown)	Herbie Crichlow; Max Martin; Denniz Pop; Jake Schulze	Martin; Pop; Schulze	3:38
2.	"When the Lights Go Out" (lead vocals: Breen, Robinson, Conlon, Neville, Brown)	Richard Breen; Jason Brown; Sean Conlon; Eliot Kennedy; Tim Lever; John McLaughlin; Ritchie Neville; Mike Percy; Scott Robinson	Kennedy; Lever; Percy	4:10
3.	"Everybody Get Up" (lead vocals: Breen, Brown)	Breen; Brown; Conlon; Crichlow; Jake Hooker; Alan Merrill; Neville; Robinson	Pop; Schulze	3:26
4.	"Got the Feelin'" (lead vocals: Brown, Breen)	Breen; Brown; Conlon; Julian Gallagher; Richard Stannard	Gallagher; Stannard	3:28
5.	"It's the Things You Do" (lead vocals: Conlon, Robinson, Brown, Breen, Neville)	Breen; Brown; Conlon; Crichlow; Martin; Neville; Robinson; George Shahin	Martin; Schulze; Lever^{[a]}; Percy^{[a]}	3:36
6.	"Human" (the Five remix) (lead vocals: Breen, Conlon, Robinson, Brown)	James Harris III; Terry Lewis	Stannard; Gallagher	3:48
7.	"Until the Time Is Through" (lead vocals: Robinson)	Andreas Carlsson; Martin	Kristian Lundin; Martin	4:15
8.	"Satisfied" (lead vocals: Conlon, Brown, Robinson)	Keith Beauvais; Breen; Brown; Conlon; Tim Hawes; Neville; Robinson	Steve Mac; Tim Laws^{[b]}	4:14
9.	"Partyline 555-On-Line" (lead vocals: Brown, Conlon, Breen, Robinson)	Breen; Brown; Conlon; Crichlow; Neville; Pop; Robinson; Schulze	Pop; Schulze	4:22
10.	"That's What You Told Me" (lead vocals: Conlon, Robinson, Breen)	Joseph Belmaati; Breen; Brown; Conlon; Mich Hedin Hansen; Wayne Hector; Neville; Robinson; Ali Tennant	Cutfather & Joe	3:44
11.	"It's All Over" (lead vocals: Robinson, Conlon, Neville, Brown, Breen)	Breen; Brown; Conlon; Kennedy; Lever; Neville; Percy; Robinson	Kennedy; Lever; Percy; Nigel Wright^{[b]}	4:12
12.	"Don't You Want It" (lead vocals: Breen, Robinson, Brown)	Breen; Brown; Conlon; Crichlow; Martin; Neville; Pop; Robinson; Schulze	Martin; Pop	3:43
13.	"Shake" (lead vocals: Breen, Brown featuring Herbie)	Breen; Brown; Conlon; Crichlow; Neville; Robinson; Schulze	Schulze	3:26
14.	"Cold Sweat" (lead vocals: Brown, Breen)	Breen; Brown; Conlon; Neville; Robinson; Mark Topham; Karl Twigg	TTW	4:06
15.	"Straight Up Funk" (lead vocals: Brown, Breen, Conlon)	Crichlow; Martin; Pop; Schulze	Pop; Schulze	3:58
16.	"My Song" (lead vocals: Brown, Conlon, Breen)	Breen; Brown; Conlon; Crichlow; Neville; Robinson; Schulze	Pop; Schulze	3:53
17.	"Switch" (hidden track) (lead vocals: Brown, Conlon, Breen)	Breen; Brown; Conlon; Crichlow; Neville; Robinson; Schulze	Pop; Schulze	4:00
Total length:				66:00

Japanese edition bonus track
No.	Title	Writer(s)	Producer(s)	Length
18.	"Can You Jam" (lead vocals: Breen, Brown)	Breen; Brown; Conlon; Neville; Robinson; Topham; Twigg	TTW	4:01

Australian edition bonus tracks
No.	Title	Writer(s)	Producer(s)	Length
18.	"You and I" (lead vocals: Robinson, Conlon)	Belmaati; Hansen; Hector; Tennant	Cutfather & Joe	3:33
19.	"Can You Jam"	Breen; Brown; Conlon; Neville; Robinson; Topham; Twigg	TTW	4:01

Special edition bonus disc: I Have Seen the Light EP
No.	Title	Writer(s)	Producer(s)	Length
1.	"You and I"	Belmaati; Hansen; Hector; Tennant	Cutfather & Joe	3:33
2.	"When the Lights Go Out" (Blacksmith hip hop mix)	Breen; Brown; Conlon; Kennedy; Lever; McLaughlin; Neville; Percy; Robinson	Kennedy; Lever; Percy; Blacksmith^{[a]}	6:20
3.	"Slam Dunk Da Funk" (extended mix)	Crichlow; Martin; Pop; Schulze	Martin; Pop; Schulze	7:29
4.	"Can You Jam?"	Breen; Brown; Conlon; Neville; Robinson; Topham; Twigg	TTW	4:01
Total length:				21:24

Malaysian special edition bonus disc
No.	Title	Writer(s)	Producer(s)	Length
1.	"Until the Time Is Through" (single mix) (lead vocals: Robinson, Neville)	Martin; Carlsson	Lundin; Martin; Mac^{[b]}	4:11
2.	"Megamix" ("Everybody Get Up"/"Slam Dunk Da Funk"/"When the Lights Go Out"/"Got the Feelin'")	Breen; Brown; Carlsson; Conlon; Crichlow; Gallagher; Hooker; Kennedy; Lever; Martin; McClaughlin; Merrill; Neville; Robinson; Percy; Pop; Stannard	Work in Progress^{[b]}	6:20
3.	"Stop Pushing Me" (lead vocals: Breen, Conlon)	Breen; Brown; Conlon; Laws; Mac; Neville; Robinson	Mac	3:10
4.	"Coming Back for More" (lead vocals: Robinson, Neville, Conlon, Brown)	Breen; Brown; Conlon; Gallagher; Stannard	Gallagher; Stannard	3:49
Total length:				16:18

US edition
No.	Title	Writer(s)	Producer(s)	Length
1.	"When the Lights Go Out" (remix) (lead vocals: Breen, Conlon, Neville, Robinson)	Breen; Brown; Conlon; Kennedy; Lever; McLaughlin; Neville; Percy; Robinson	Kennedy; Lever; Percy; Cutfather & Joe^{[b]}	4:07
2.	"That's What You Told Me"	Belmaati; Breen; Brown; Conlon; Hansen; Hector; Neville; Robinson; Tennant	Cutfather & Joe	3:44
3.	"It's the Things You Do" (remix)	Breen; Brown; Conlon; Crichlow; Martin; Neville; Robinson; Shahin	Martin; Schulze; Lever^{[a]}; Percy^{[a]}; Cutfather & Joe^{[b]}	3:29
4.	"When I Remember When" (lead vocals: Robinson, Neville)	Jud Friedman; Shelly Peiken	Cutfather & Joe	4:05
5.	"Slam Dunk Da Funk"	Crichlow; Martin; Pop; Schulze	Martin; Pop; Schulze	3:38
6.	"Satisfied"	Beauvais; Breen; Brown; Conlon; Hawes; Neville; Robinson		4:14
7.	"It's All Over"	Breen; Brown; Conlon; Kennedy; Lever; Neville; Percy; Robinson	Kennedy; Lever; Percy; Wright^{[b]}	4:12
8.	"Partyline 555-On-Line"	Breen; Brown; Conlon; Crichlow; Neville; Pop; Robinson; Schulze	Pop; Schulze	4:22
9.	"Until the Time Is Through" (remix) (lead vocals: Robinson)	Carlsson; Martin	Lundin; Martin; Cutfather & Joe^{[b]}	4:15
10.	"Everybody Get Up"	Breen; Brown; Conlon; Crichlow; Hooker; Merrill; Neville; Robinson	Pop; Schulze	3:25
11.	"My Song"	Breen; Brown; Conlon; Crichlow; Neville; Robinson; Schulze	Pop; Schulze	3:53
12.	"Got the Feelin'"	Breen; Brown; Conlon; Gallagher; Stannard	Gallagher; Stannard	3:27
Total length:				45:54

Notes

- ^{^[a]} signifies a remixer
- ^{^[b]} signifies an additional producer
- "Slam Dunk Da Funk" contains a sample from "Clap Your Hands", performed by Herbie.
- "Everybody Get Up" contains a sample from "I Love Rock 'n' Roll", performed by Joan Jett & The Black Hearts.
- "Switch" contains a sample from "Every Guy", performed by Take That.

== Credits and personnel ==
Note: Track numbers are according to the international edition of the album.

Main producers

- Simon Cowell – executive production
- Denniz Pop – executive production; production on tracks 1, 3, 9, 12, 15, 16 and 55
- Jake Schulze – production on tracks 1, 3, 5, 9, 13, 15, 16 and 55

Additional producers

- Max Martin – production on tracks 1, 5, 7 and 12
- Eliot Kennedy – production on tracks 3 and 11; mixing on track 3
- Tim Lever – production on tracks 3 and 11; mixing on track 3; remix on track 5
- Mike Percy – production on tracks 3 and 11; mixing on track 3; remix on track 5
- Richard Stannard – production on tracks 4 and 6
- Julian Gallagher – production on tracks 4 and 6
- Kristian Lundin – production on track 7
- Steve Mac – production and mixing on track 8
- Cutfather & Joe – production and mixing on track 10
- TTW (Topham Twigg and Paul Waterman) – production on track 14

Additional production personnel

- Matt Sime – recording and mixing on tracks 4 and 6
- Tim Laws – additional production and additional mixing on track 8
- Chris Laws – engineering on track 8
- Robin Sellars – mix engineering on track 8; remix engineering on track 11
- Dave Walters – additional engineering on track 8
- Andy Kowalski – additional mix engineering on track 8
- Fred Defaye – engineering on track 9
- Joe Belmaati – recording on track 10
- Mads Nilsson – mixing on track 10
- Nigel Wright – remix on track 11
- Chris McDonnell – engineering on track 14
- Paul Waterman – mixing on track 14

== Charts ==
=== Weekly charts ===
Chart (1998)	Peak position
Australian Albums (ARIA)	8
Belgian Albums (Ultratop Flanders)	1
Belgian Albums (Ultratop Wallonia)	4
Canadian Albums (RPM)	38
Danish Albums (Hitlisten)	11
Dutch Albums (Album Top 100)	2
Estonian Albums (Eesti Top 10)	8
European Albums Chart	5
Finnish Albums (Suomen virallinen lista)	16
Greek Albums (IFPI Greece)	1
Hungarian Albums (MAHASZ)	9
Icelandic Albums (Tónlist)	9
Irish Albums (IRMA)	3
Italian Albums (FIMI)	6
Italian Albums (Musica e Dischi)	19
Japanese Albums (Oricon)	61
Malaysian Albums (IFPI)	8
New Zealand Albums (RMNZ)	1
Norwegian Albums (VG-lista)	25
Scottish Albums (OCC)	7
Singapore Albums (SPVA)	10
Swedish Albums (Sverigetopplistan)	6
Taiwanese Albums (IFPI)	1
UK Albums Chart (OCC)	1
US Billboard 200	27

=== Year-end charts ===
Chart (1998)	Peak position
Australian Albums (ARIA)	24
Belgian Albums (Ultratop Flanders)	19
Belgian Albums (Ultratop Wallonia)	49
Dutch Albums (MegaCharts)	34
European Albums (Eurochart Hot 100)	60
Italian Albums (FIMI)	29
Swedish Albums (Sverigetopplistan)	19
UK Albums (OCC)	25
Chart (1999)	Peak position
Australian Albums (ARIA)	33
UK Albums (OCC)	149

== Certifications and sales ==
Region	Certification	Certified units/sales
Australia (ARIA)	3× Platinum	250,000
Belgium (BRMA)	Platinum	50,000^{*}
Brazil	—	120,000
Canada (Music Canada)	Gold	50,000^{^}
Italy (FIMI)	2× Platinum	200,000
Netherlands (NVPI)	Gold	50,000^{^}
New Zealand (RMNZ)	Platinum	15,000^{^}
Spain (Promusicae)	Gold	50,000^{^}
Sweden (GLF)	Platinum	80,000^{^}
United Kingdom (BPI)	2× Platinum	600,000^{*}
United States (RIAA)	Platinum	1,000,000^{^}
Summaries
Europe (IFPI)	Platinum	1,000,000^{*}
Worldwide	—	4,000,000
^{*} Sales figures based on certification alone.^{^} Shipments figures based on certification alone.

== Release history ==
Country	Date	Format	Label
Australia	13 July 1998	CD, Cassette	RCA
Ireland	13 July 1998	CD, Cassette	RCA
New Zealand	13 July 1998	CD, Cassette	RCA
United Kingdom	13 July 1998	CD, Cassette	RCA
United States	13 July 1998	CD, Cassette	Arista
United Kingdom	17 June 2023	Vinyl, Double LP	Sony Music
