= Kingsize (Five album) =

Studio album by Five
- Released: 27 August 2001
- Genres: Pop; hip hop; dance-pop; teen pop; R&B
- Length: 56:30
- Labels: BMG; RCA
- Producers: Julian Gallagher; Richard Stannard; Ash Howes; Steve Mac; Stargate; Eliot Kennedy

Five chronology
Invincible (1999)	Kingsize (2001)	Greatest Hits (2001)

Singles from Kingsize
- 1. "Let's Dance" Released: 13 August 2001; 2. "Closer to Me" Released: 22 October 2001; 3. "Rock the Party" Released: 3 December 2001

Kingsize is the third studio album by English boy band Five. It was released in the United Kingdom on 27 August 2001 and later in Australia on 2 December 2001. On the UK Albums Chart, the album peaked at number three and was certified gold. Kingsize was the last album released by Five before their initial breakup.

Three singles were released from Kingsize. The lead single, "Let's Dance", became a major hit, reaching number one on the UK Singles Chart. The other singles from the album were "Closer to Me" and "Rock the Party".

== Background ==
Despite only being released three months earlier, Kingsize was re-issued in the United Kingdom on 24 December 2001, containing an additional track, "The Heat", as well an enhanced section, featuring music videos and interview clips. The Japanese release of Kingsize features an additional slipcase, as well as the bonus track "1,2,3,4,5", which was issued as the B-side to "Closer to Me" in the United Kingdom.

Copies of the album bought at Woolworths stores in the United Kingdom came with an exclusive poster booklet, containing information and facts on the band, as well as a complete chart history and discography. The poster booklet also indicated that a VHS release was planned to be released alongside the album, entitled Kingsize: Behind the Scenes, detailing the recording of the album, featuring interviews with the band, and including the music videos for the lead single, "Let's Dance", and at the time, was planned as the album's second single, "Hear Me Now".

However, due to the band's imminent split, "Hear Me Now" was never released as a single, the VHS release was cancelled, and a Greatest Hits compilation was released just three months after the release of Kingsize. The track "Set Me Free", which was recorded during the album sessions, was later issued as an original track on the band's Greatest Hits compilation.

== Critical reception ==
Professional ratings
Review scores
Source	Rating
RTÉ	1/5 stars

The critic from Penarth Times wrote that the album starts off with energy with songs like "Let's Dance" for its "funky disco beat" and "Rock The Party" for its use of a Grease sample, but as the album progresses, tracks like "Take Your Chances On Me" and "On Top of the World" become repetitive and tiresome, and the album loses its momentum toward the end.

The critic from PopMatters stated that, despite Five disbanding, their Kingsize showcases their ability to blend R&B, hip-hop, and pop influences better than their contemporaries like Backstreet Boys and *NSYNC. The review highlights tracks like "Let’s Dance", which features an upbeat, layered sound with voice modulation, and "Lay All Your Lovin’ on Me", praised for its use of ACDC’s guitar riff. The critic also notes that while their slower songs target a younger audience, Five’s energetic and catchy songs, such as "Rock the Party", demonstrate that they stood out for their funky, unapologetic approach to pop music.

Sineád Gleeson from RTÉ stated that it's hard to understand what Five is trying to achieve with their album Kingsize. She noted that the group attempts to incorporate snippets of various genres into pop-sized songs, but ultimately fails, producing a "hollow collection of derivatives". She described the album as formulaic, advising those with musical taste to steer clear.

== Track listing ==
No.	Title	Writer(s)	Producer(s)	Length
1.	"Let's Dance" (lead vocals: Breen, Brown, Conlon, Neville)	Richard Breen; Jason Brown; Sean Conlon; Julian Gallagher; Martin Harrington; Ash Howes; Richard "Biff" Stannard	Gallagher; Stannard	3:37
2.	"Lay All Your Lovin' on Me" (lead vocals: Brown, Breen)	Angus Young; Malcolm Young; Brian Johnson	Gallagher; Stannard	3:21
3.	"Rock the Party" (lead vocals: Breen, Brown)	Breen; Brown; Conlon; Gallagher; Barry Gibb; Stannard	Gallagher; Stannard	2:57
4.	"Closer to Me" (lead vocals: Breen, Neville, Brown)	Breen; Brown; Gallagher; Harrington; Howes; Stannard	Gallagher; Stannard	4:28
5.	"Hear Me Now" (lead vocals: Neville, Robinson)	Mikkel S. Eriksen; Tor Erik Hermansen; Ritchie Neville; Scott Robinson; Hallgeir Rustan	Stargate	3:40
6.	"Let's Get It On" (lead vocals: Breen, Robinson, Brown)	Breen; Brown; Conlon; Gallagher; Harrington; Howes; Stannard	Gallagher; Stannard	3:46
7.	"Feel the Love" (lead vocals: Robinson, Neville)	Chris Laws; Steve Mac; Neville; Robinson	Mac	4:41
8.	"We're Going All Night (You Make Me High)" (lead vocals: Brown, Breen, Neville)	Breen; Brown; Conlon; Gallagher; Stannard	Gallagher; Stannard	3:03
9.	"Take Your Chances on Me" (lead vocals: Conlon, Breen)	Breen; Brown; Ben Chapman; Conlon; Gallagher; Harrington; Howes; Stannard	Gallagher; Stannard	3:01
10.	"Something in the Air" (lead vocals: Breen, Conlon, Brown)	Breen; Brown; Conlon; Gallagher; Stannard	Gallagher; Stannard	4:10
11.	"Breakdown" (lead vocals: Neville, Robinson)	Eriksen; Hermansen; Neville; Robinson; Rustan	Stargate	3:26
12.	"On Top of the World" (lead vocals: Robinson, Neville)	Eriksen; Hermansen; Neville; Robinson; Rustan	Stargate	3:40
13.	"C'mon C'mon" (lead vocals: Breen, Brown)	Breen; Brown; Chapman; Conlon; Gallagher; Harrington; Howes; Stannard	Gallagher; Stannard	4:50
14.	"World of Mine" (hidden track) (lead vocals: Neville, Robinson)	Eriksen; Hermansen; Neville; Robinson; Rustan	Stargate	4:02
15.	"All Around" (hidden track) (lead vocals: Neville, Robinson)	Eliot Kennedy; Neville; Tim Woodcock	Steelworks	3:47
Total length:				56:30

Special Edition bonus tracks
No.	Title	Writer(s)	Producer(s)	Length
13.	"The Heat" (lead vocals: Breen, Brown)	Breen; Brown; Conlon; Gallagher; Stannard	Gallagher; Stannard	3:15
14.	"All Around"	Kennedy; Neville; Woodcock	Steelworks	3:47
15.	"C'mon C'mon"	Breen; Brown; Chapman; Conlon; Gallagher; Harrington; Howes; Stannard	Gallagher; Stannard	4:50
16.	"World of Mine" (hidden track)	Eriksen; Hermansen; Neville; Robinson; Rustan	Stargate	4:02

Japanese edition bonus track
No.	Title	Writer(s)	Producer(s)	Length
16.	"1,2,3,4,5" (lead vocals: Robinson, Neville)	Gallagher; Neville; Robinson; Stannard	Gallagher; Stannard	3:51

Notes

- "Lay All Your Lovin' on Me" contains a sample from "Back in Black", performed by AC/DC.
- "Rock the Party" contains a sample from the main theme from "Grease".

== Personnel ==
Credits adapted from Kingsize's liner notes.

- Abs Breen – composer, vocals
- Andy Caine – backing vocals
- Ash Howes – mixing, programming
- Ben Chapman – production, mixing, engineering
- Ben Coombs – engineering
- Daniel Pursey – engineering
- Dave Arch – arrangement
- Eliot Kennedy – backing vocals
- Jason "J" Brown – composer, vocals
- Julian Gallagher – arrangement, production
- Martin Harrington – programming
- Matt Howe – engineering
- Richard Stannard – arrangement, production, backing vocals
- Ritchie Neville – composer, vocals
- Robin Sellers – engineering
- Scott Robinson – composer, vocals
- Sean Conlon – composer, vocals
- Sharon Murphy – backing vocals
- Stargate – production, mixing
- Steve Mac – production
- Tim Woodcock – backing vocals

== Charts ==
=== Weekly charts ===
Chart (2001)	Peak position
Australian Albums (ARIA)	21
Belgian Albums (Ultratop Flanders)	7
Dutch Albums (Album Top 100)	27
European Albums Chart	15
German Albums (Offizielle Top 100)	59
Hungarian Albums (MAHASZ)	26
Irish Albums (IRMA)	13
Italian Albums (FIMI)	25
Italian Albums (Musica e Dischi)	25
Japanese Albums (Oricon)	83
New Zealand Albums (RMNZ)	16
Scottish Albums (Official Charts)	5
Swedish Albums (Sverigetopplistan)	41
Swiss Albums (Schweizer Hitparade)	62
UK Albums (Official Charts)	3

=== Year-end charts ===
Chart (2001)	Position
UK Albums (OCC)	132

== Certifications ==
Region	Certification	Certified units/sales
Australia (ARIA)	Gold	35,000^{^}
United Kingdom (BPI)	Gold	100,000^{^}
^{^} Shipments figures based on certification alone.

== Release history ==
Country	Date	Format	Label
United Kingdom	27 August 2001	CD, cassette	BMG
