= Rock the Party =

2001 single by Five

Single by Five

from the album Kingsize
- B-side: "Set Me Free"; "Breakdown"; "On Top of the World"
- Released: 3 December 2001
- Length: 2:49
- Label: RCA; BMG
- Songwriters: Richard Stannard; Julian Gallagher; Richard Breen; Jason Brown; Sean Conlon; Barry Gibb
- Producers: Richard "Biff" Stannard; Julian Gallagher

Five singles chronology
"Closer to Me" (2001)	"Rock the Party" (2001)	"I Wish It Could Be Christmas Everyday" (2013)

Music video
- "Rock the Party" on YouTube

"Rock the Party" is a song by English boy band Five, released on 3 December 2001 as the third and final single from their third studio album, Kingsize (2001), outside the United Kingdom. It was also included on their Greatest Hits album, released the same year. The song is based on a sample of Frankie Valli's "Grease", written by Barry Gibb. "Rock the Party" was not released in the UK, where it instead appeared as a B-side on the second CD single of "Closer to Me". In Australia, "Rock the Party" was released as a double A-side with "Closer to Me".

== Music video ==
The music video, directed by Sean Smith, features an animated version of the band on their night out at a nightclub.

== Track listings ==
European CD single

1. "Rock the Party" (single remix) – 2:49
2. "Set Me Free" – 2:54

European maxi-CD single

1. "Rock the Party" (single remix) – 2:49
2. "Breakdown" – 3:22
3. "On Top of the World" – 3:40
4. "Set Me Free" – 2:54
5. "Rock the Party" (video)

Australian CD single

1. "Rock the Party" (single remix) – 2:49
2. "Closer to Me" (single remix) – 4:29
3. "Let's Dance" (The Maverick Monkey mix) – 5:19
4. "12345" – 3:40

== Charts ==
Weekly chart performance for "Rock the Party"
Chart (2001–2002)	Peak position
Australia (ARIA)	55
Belgium (Ultratip Bubbling Under Flanders)	2
New Zealand (Recorded Music NZ)	44
Norway (VG-lista)	14
Poland Airplay (Polish Airplay Charts)	6

== Release history ==
Region	Version	Date	Format(s)	Label(s)	Ref.
Australia	"Rock the Party" / "Closer to Me"	3 December 2001	CD	RCA; BMG	
Sweden	"Rock the Party"	14 January 2002	CD	RCA; BMG	
