= Everybody Get Up (Five song) =

1998 single by Five

Single by Five

from the album Five
- B-side: "My Song"
- Released: 31 August 1998
- Studio: Cheiron (Stockholm, Sweden)
- Length: 3:25 (album version); 3:03 (radio edit)
- Label: RCA; BMG
- Songwriters: Alan Merrill; Five; Jake Hooker; Herbie Crichlow
- Producers: Denniz Pop; Jake Schulze

Five singles chronology
"Got the Feelin'" (1998)	"Everybody Get Up" (1998)	"It's the Things You Do" (1998)

Music video
- "Everybody Get Up" on YouTube

"Everybody Get Up" is a song by British boy band Five. It was released on 31 August 1998 as the fourth single from their self-titled debut album (1998). The song was written by Five, Herbie Crichlow, Alan Merrill and Jake Hooker and produced by Denniz Pop and Jake Schulze. Merrill and Hooker are credited as songwriters because the track contains samples from Joan Jett's version of "I Love Rock 'n' Roll". "Everybody Get Up" has received a gold certification for sales and streams of over 400,000 units in the United Kingdom, where it peaked at number two on 6 September 1998. Worldwide, the song topped the New Zealand Singles Chart and reached the top five in Australia, Ireland, Spain, and Sweden.

== Music video ==
The music video starts off with a number of secondary school students preparing to take an exam in a large hall, which contains a stage. Just as they turn over their papers and begin writing, the teacher in charge, Mr. McGarry, is told over the intercom to come to the headmaster's office. McGarry says that he will be back in five minutes (around the length of video) and tells everyone to stay in their seats in silence. As soon as he leaves, one boy starts hitting his desk with a ruler and after a few seconds everyone else does the same on their own desks.

Five are then shown walking down the corridor behind the stage. Abs Breen pushes down on a lever on the wall, which dims the lights where they are and opens up the curtain. The music then starts and the students stand up, throw their papers in the air, knock their desks over and start throwing their chairs around. Girls with their hair tied back remove their hair ties to let their hair flow free. One girl also removes her glasses and throws her cardigan open. A massive party starts and the students dance with Five as they sing. Some of the male students do somersaults and breakdance and the Five boys jump high into the air at times as well. The band are showing wearing two different outfits each throughout the video.

During the chorus after the first verse, Scott Robinson takes a can of brown paint and Ritchie Neville takes a can of white paint, and they both throw their paint all over everyone. J Brown is held up by the crowd as he sings the second verse, during which more blue paint is thrown by Robinson and Neville. The students all imitate Five's moves during the chorus after the second verse. At the bridge, someone lights a lighter and holds it against the fire sprinkler on the ceiling. Water begins pouring down over everyone and drenches them, but doesn't wash the paint off.

By this time, none of Five have been covered with paint or water. Towards the end of the video, one girl, wet and drenched in paint, is sitting in her chair smiling and tapping a ruler against her desk (she may have not moved throughout the whole song). When the song ends, McGarry turns the lever back up and returns to an empty, dirty room. He exclaims his disbelief at what he sees and the camera changes to a shot behind Five of them walking slowly back down the corridor behind the stage.

== Track listings ==
UK CD1

1. "Everybody Get Up" (radio edit)
2. "My Song" (exclusive single remix)
3. CD ROM

UK CD2

1. "Everybody Get Up" (radio edit)
2. "Everybody Get Up" (Johan S Toxic Rock mix)
3. "Everybody Get Up" (Paul Masterson vocal mix)

UK cassette single

1. "Everybody Get Up" (radio edit)
2. "My Song" (exclusive single remix)
3. "Everybody Get Up" (extended)

European CD single

1. "Everybody Get Up" (radio edit)
2. "My Song" (exclusive single remix)

Australian and Japanese CD single

1. "Everybody Get Up" (radio edit)
2. "My Song" (exclusive single remix)
3. "Everybody Get Up" (Johan S Toxic Rock mix)
4. "Everybody Get Up" (Paul Masterson vocal mix)

== Credits and personnel ==
Credits are lifted from the Five album booklet.

Studio

- Recorded at Cheiron Studios (Stockholm, Sweden)

Personnel

- Alan Merrill – writing
- Five – writing
- Jake Hooker – writing
- Herbie Crichlow – writing
- Denniz Pop – production
- Jake Schulze – production

== Charts ==
=== Weekly charts ===
Chart (1998)	Peak position
Australia (ARIA)	5
Austria (Ö3 Austria Top 40)	40
Belgium (Ultratop 50 Flanders)	22
Belgium (Ultratop 50 Wallonia)	13
Estonia (Eesti Top 20)	7
Europe (Eurochart Hot 100)	20
Europe (European Hit Radio)	37
Finland (Suomen virallinen lista)	17
France (SNEP)	24
Germany (GfK)	25
Iceland (Íslenski Listinn Topp 40)	22
Ireland (IRMA)	4
Netherlands (Dutch Top 40)	9
Netherlands (Single Top 100)	12
Netherlands Airplay (Music & Media)	8
New Zealand (Recorded Music NZ)	1
Poland Airplay (Music & Media)	12
Scottish Singles Sales (Official Charts)	5
Spain (AFYVE)	3
Spain Airplay (Top 40 Radio)	22
Sweden (Sverigetopplistan)	5
Switzerland (Schweizer Hitparade)	24
UK Singles (Official Charts)	2
UK Airplay (Music Week)	19

Chart (2025)	Peak position
UK Singles Downloads (Official Charts)	83
UK Singles Sales (OCC)	88

=== Year-end charts ===
Chart (1998)	Position
Australia (ARIA)	31
Belgium (Ultratop 50 Wallonia)	62
Netherlands (Dutch Top 40)	96
Netherlands (Single Top 100)	79
New Zealand (RIANZ)	35
Sweden (Hitlistan)	27
UK Singles (OCC)	79

== Certifications and sales ==
Region	Certification	Certified units/sales
Australia (ARIA)	Platinum	70,000^{^}
New Zealand (RMNZ)	Gold	5,000^{*}
Sweden (GLF)	Gold	15,000^{^}
United Kingdom (BPI)	Gold	465,000
^{*} Sales figures based on certification alone.^{^} Shipments figures based on certification alone.

== Release history ==
Region	Date	Format(s)	Label(s)	Ref.
Sweden	31 August 1998	CD	RCA; BMG	
United Kingdom	31 August 1998	CD; cassette	RCA; BMG	
Japan	21 October 1998	CD	RCA; BMG	
United States	12 July 1999	Contemporary hit radio	Arista	
