= Closer to Me =

2001 single by Five

Single by Five

from the album Kingsize
- B-side: "1,2,3,4,5"; "The Heat"
- Released: 22 October 2001
- Length: 4:28
- Label: RCA
- Songwriters: Richard Stannard; Julian Gallagher; Ash Howes; Martin Harrington; Richard Breen; Jason Brown
- Producers: Richard "Biff" Stannard; Julian Gallagher

Five singles chronology
"Let's Dance" (2001)	"Closer to Me" (2001)	"Rock the Party" (2001)

Music video
- "Closer to Me" on YouTube

"Closer to Me" is a song by English boyband Five. It was released on 22 October 2001 as the second single from their third studio album, Kingsize (2001). The song peaked at No. 4 on the UK Singles Chart and was Five's final British release, with the band breaking up after doing promotional appearances for it; follow-up single "Rock the Party" was ultimately included on a second CD single of "Closer to Me" in the UK, released on 26 November. The video for the song was directed by Max & Dania and features various vintage band footage.

== Track listings ==
UK CD1

1. "Closer to Me" (single remix) – 4:29
2. "1,2,3,4,5" – 3:40
3. "The Heat" – 3:09

UK CD2

1. "Closer to Me" (single remix) – 4:29
2. "Rock the Party" (single remix) – 2:49
3. "Closer to Me" (video)

UK cassette single

1. "Closer to Me" (single remix) – 4:29
2. "1,2,3,4,5" – 3:40

European CD single

1. "Closer to Me" (single remix) – 4:29
2. "Let's Dance" (The Maverick Monkey mix) – 5:19

== Credits and personnel ==
Credits are taken from the Kingsize album booklet.

Studio

- Mixed at Biffco Studios (Dublin, Ireland)

Personnel

- Richard "Biff" Stannard – writing (as Richard Stannard), production
- Julian Gallagher – writing, production
- Ash Howes – writing, keyboards, programming, recording, mixing
- Martin Harrington – writing, keyboards, programming, additional recording
- Abz Love – writing (as Richard Breen)
- Jason Brown – writing
- Andy Caine – backing vocals
- Sharon Murphy – backing vocals
- Milton McDonald – guitars
- Alvin Sweeney – additional recording

== Charts ==
=== Weekly charts ===
Chart (2001)	Peak position
Australia (ARIA) with "Rock the Party"	55
Belgium (Ultratop 50 Flanders)	38
Europe (Eurochart Hot 100)	16
Ireland (IRMA)	12
Italy (FIMI)	37
Netherlands (Single Top 100)	78
Romania (Romanian Top 100)	14
Scottish Singles Sales (Official Charts)	4
UK Singles (Official Charts)	4
UK Airplay (Music Week)	39

=== Year-end charts ===
Chart (2001)	Position
Ireland (IRMA)	90
UK Singles (OCC)	104

== Release history ==
Region	Version	Date	Format(s)	Label(s)	Ref.
United Kingdom	"Closer to Me"	22 October 2001	CD1; cassette	RCA	
United Kingdom	"Closer to Me"	26 November 2001	CD2	RCA	
Sweden	"Closer to Me"	26 November 2001	CD	RCA	
Australia	"Rock the Party" / "Closer to Me"	3 December 2001	CD	RCA	
