= Let's Dance (Five song) =

2001 single by Five

Single by Five

from the album Kingsize
- B-side: "Sometimes"; "Millennium Megamix"
- Released: 13 August 2001
- Genre: Dance-pop
- Length: 3:38
- Label: RCA; BMG
- Songwriters: Richard Stannard; Julian Gallagher; Ash Howes; Martin Harrington; Richard Breen; Jason Brown; Sean Conlon
- Producers: Richard "Biff" Stannard; Julian Gallagher

Five singles chronology
"We Will Rock You" (2000)	"Let's Dance" (2001)	"Closer to Me" (2001)

Music video
- "Let's Dance" on YouTube

"Let's Dance" is a song by English boy band Five. It was released on 13 August 2001 as the lead single from their third studio album, Kingsize (2001). The song was written by Richard Stannard, Julian Gallagher, Ash Howes, Martin Harrington, Abz Love, Jason "J" Brown, and Sean Conlon and produced by Stannard and Gallagher.

"Let's Dance" charted at number one on the UK Singles Chart, becoming Five's third and final number-one single, and was certified silver by the British Phonographic Industry (BPI). The song also peaked at number two on the Irish Singles Chart and became a top-10 in hit in Australia, Flanders, Greece, and Romania.

== Music video ==
The official music video was directed by Max and Dania. The music video used a life-sized cardboard image of Conlon since he was not present at the time of filming. While it claimed at the time that he was ill with glandular fever, he had actually left the band due to exhaustion and mental health issues. He told NME in 2022: "It wasn't the best. I was already feeling down and being replaced with a cardboard cutout was like a dig in the ribs. There wasn't the awareness then [that] there is now. Back then, if you said you had problems, there wasn't any sympathy." Robinson said in 2025 that the video should never have been allowed to happen.

The video was also the last music video that Five recorded before their break-up, as the video for "Closer to Me" was a compilation of old video footage, and the video for "Rock the Party" was animated.

== Track listings ==
UK and Irish CD1

1. "Let's Dance" (radio edit) – 3:38
2. "Sometimes" – 3:51
3. "Let's Dance" (The Kinkyboy remix) – 6:30
4. "Let's Dance" (director's cut video) – 5:17

UK and Irish CD2

1. "Let's Dance" (radio edit) – 3:38
2. "Millenium Megamix" – 5:12
3. CD-ROM interviews

UK cassette single and European CD single

1. "Let's Dance" (radio edit) – 3:38
2. "Sometimes" – 3:51

Australian CD single

1. "Let's Dance" (radio edit) – 3:38
2. "Sometimes" – 5:12
3. "Let's Dance" (The Kinkyboy mix) – 6:30
4. "Millenium Megamix" – 5:12

== Credits and personnel ==
Credits are taken from the Kingsize album booklet.

Studio

- Mixed at Biffco Studios (Dublin, Ireland)

Personnel

- Richard "Biff" Stannard – writing (as Richard Stannard), backing vocals, production
- Julian Gallagher – writing, guitars, production
- Ash Howes – writing, keyboards, programming, recording, mixing
- Martin Harrington – writing, keyboards, programming, recording
- Abz Love – writing (as Richard Breen)
- Jason Brown – writing
- Sean Conlon – writing
- Andy Caine – backing vocals
- Steve Lewinson – bass
- Simon Hale – keyboards
- Alvin Sweeney – recording

== Charts ==
=== Weekly charts ===
Chart (2001)	Peak position
Australia (ARIA)	3
Austria (Ö3 Austria Top 40)	64
Belgium (Ultratop 50 Flanders)	8
Belgium (Ultratip Bubbling Under Wallonia)	3
Europe (Eurochart Hot 100)	6
Europe (European Hit Radio)	7
Finland Airplay (Radiosoittolista)	15
Germany (GfK)	54
Greece (IFPI)	8
Ireland (IRMA)	2
Italy (FIMI)	15
Italy (Musica e dischi)	14
Latvia (Latvijas Top 30)	17
Netherlands (Dutch Top 40)	22
Netherlands (Single Top 100)	21
New Zealand (Recorded Music NZ)	11
Poland Airplay (Music & Media)	15
Romania (Romanian Top 100)	8
Scottish Singles Sales (Official Charts)	1
Spain (Promusicae)	12
Spain Airplay (Top 40 Radio)	21
Sweden (Sverigetopplistan)	20
Switzerland (Schweizer Hitparade)	77
UK Singles (Official Charts)	1
UK Airplay (Music Week)	5

=== Year-end charts ===
Chart (2001)	Position
Australia (ARIA)	82
Belgium (Ultratop 50 Flanders)	94
Europe (European Hit Radio)	65
Ireland (IRMA)	34
Romania (Romanian Top 100)	96
UK Singles (OCC)	29

== Certifications and sales ==
Region	Certification	Certified units/sales
Australia (ARIA)	Gold	35,000^{^}
United Kingdom (BPI)	Silver	200,000^{^}
^{^} Shipments figures based on certification alone.

== Release history ==
Region	Date	Format(s)	Label(s)	Ref.
Australia	13 August 2001	CD	RCA; BMG	
Sweden	13 August 2001	CD	RCA; BMG	
United Kingdom	13 August 2001	CD; cassette	RCA; BMG	
