= Five (group) =

British boy band

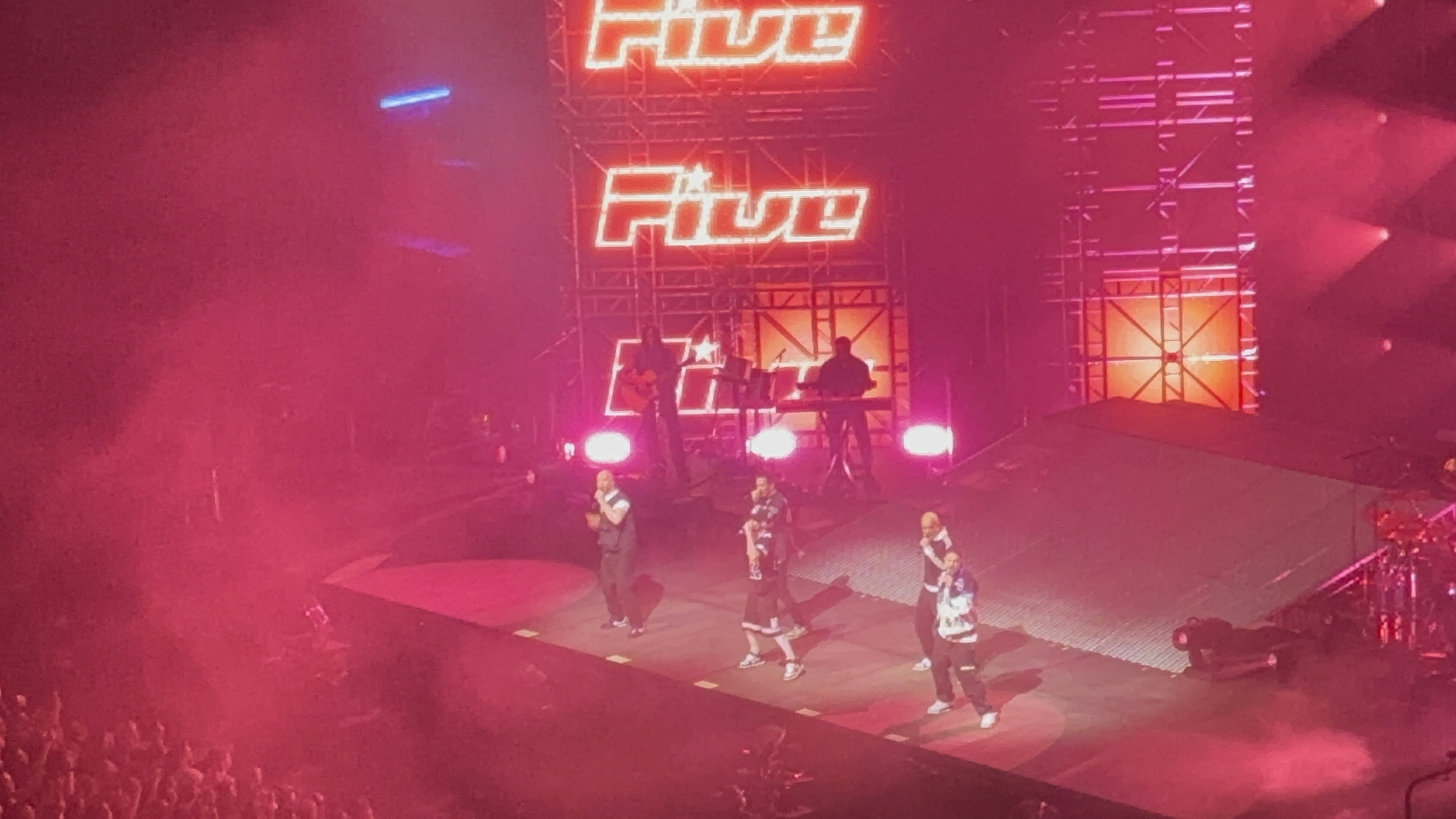
- Five performing in Sydney, Australia, in May 2026

Background information
- Also known as: 5ive
- Origin: London, England
- Genres: Pop; dance-pop; pop rap; hip-hop; rap rock
- Years active: 1997–2001; 2006–2007; 2012–present
- Labels: BMG; RCA; Arista
- Members: Abz Love; Scott Robinson; Ritchie Neville; Sean Conlon; Jason "J" Brown
- Website: Official website

Five (occasionally stylised as 5ive) are an English boy band formed in 1997, consisting of members Abz Love, Scott Robinson, Ritchie Neville, Sean Conlon, and Jason "J" Brown. Five released several hit singles around the turn of the 21st century, particularly succeeding in their native United Kingdom. The group has sold over 20 million records worldwide and, according to the British Phonographic Industry (BPI), has been certified for sales of 1.6 million albums and 3.4 million singles in the UK.

Five were formed by Heart Management, who held auditions to create a boy band. The group were signed by Simon Cowell and BMG/RCA. In November 1997, Five released their debut single, "Slam Dunk (Da Funk)", which peaked at number 10 on the UK Singles Chart. Their next single, "When the Lights Go Out", became an international hit, peaking at number 10 on the Billboard Hot 100 in the United States, 4 in the UK, and within the top ten of six further countries. Their debut album, Five (1998), sold over 4 million copies worldwide and produced 3 additional UK top-3 singles: "Got the Feelin'", "Everybody Get Up" and "Until the Time Is Through" as well as the United States single, "It's the Things You Do".

Their second album, Invincible (1999), sold over one million copies worldwide and contains the number-2 UK hit "If Ya Gettin' Down" as well as the number-1 hits "We Will Rock You" and "Keep On Movin'": the latter became their best-selling single. Five released their third album, Kingsize (2001), amid tensions within the group. Conlon did not appear in the music video for the album's first single, "Let's Dance". The band attributed his lack of participation in the video and promotional activities to illness. The song became a number-1 hit. In September the group announced they would be splitting; Greatest Hits was released that November.

The group briefly reformed without Conlon in September 2006, but soon disbanded. In 2012 they announced they were planning another reunion, this time with Conlon on board but without Brown. The group continued with only four members, but decided to keep the name Five. Alongside other musical groups, Five were featured in the ITV2 contrived-documentary series The Big Reunion (2013). This was followed by the collaborative Big Reunion tour that May. In August 2014, Love announced his departure from the band, leaving Conlon, Neville, and Robinson to continue as a trio until February 2025 when the original lineup reformed.

== Career ==
=== 1997–1998: Formation and Five ===
In 1997 an advertisement was placed in the UK performing-arts newspaper The Stage, asking for young male singers/dancers to audition for a boy-band-style group with "attitude and edge". Bob and Chris Herbert of Heart Management, who had earlier created the Spice Girls, thought the time was right for a male group. Over 3,000 hopefuls auditioned, including Russell Brand, who performed Extreme's song "More Than Words" for the judges. They were finally narrowed down to only 14, five of whom had arranged themselves into a group while waiting for their audition. The auditions resulted in a provisional casting of nine members: Ritchie Neville, Scott Robinson, Sean Conlon, Jason "J" Brown, Richard Breen (now better known as Abz Love), and Peter Cheshire, Paul Taylor, Anthony Baker (rapper) and Ric Hershon. As his first name is Richard, Breen used his nickname Abs (from his middle name Abidin) to avoid confusion with Ritchie (born Richard Neville Dobson). Cheshire and Taylor were cut when the final members were chosen in May 1997 and Hershon could not attend the final selection. Baker made it into the band originally, but doubt was cast over his rapping style as his North-East accent came through. The management initially were looking for a four-piece band, and were going to select J, Sean, Scott and Ritchie for the band, but when they saw Abs with the others they decided a five-piece would work better.

The group were signed by Simon Cowell and BMG/RCA for a six-album deal. Five practised and demoed their work at Trinity Studios in Knaphill. In November 1997, Five released their debut single "Slam Dunk (Da Funk)", which debuted at number 10 in the UK Singles Chart. The song was also released in the U.S. in 1998 but had little chart success, reaching number 86 on the Billboard Hot 100, and was chosen as the NBA's new theme song. In 1998, Five earned their first major international hit, "When the Lights Go Out", which cracked the U.S. top 10 and earned gold status there soon after. Five then went on an eight-day tour to promote their upcoming album, appearing in a concert special for the Disney Channel with Irish girl group B*Witched, in Times Square in New York City and on MTV's TRL. The debut album, Five, peaked at number 27 in the U.S. Billboard 200 and topped the charts in other countries worldwide, including the UK.

"It's the Things You Do" was released in late 1998 in the U.S., only to receive a lukewarm reception. The group embarked upon a U.S. tour with the American boy band NSYNC, but soon after pulled out due to exhaustion, flying back to England to rest and start work on a new album. Still from the first album, "Got the Feelin'", "Everybody Get Up", and "Until the Time Is Through" were all released as singles in the UK during 1998. The group reached the top 5 in several countries around the world, and the last two singles each rose to the number-two spot in the UK. A significant element in Five's popularity was their resemblance to groups such as New Kids on the Block, East 17, the Backstreet Boys and NSYNC in their uptempo musical style and 'street' image, in contrast to Take That, Boyzone, and 98 Degrees, who at the time were primarily known for their ballads. Five also wrote or co-wrote the majority of their songs, which was atypical of boy bands at the time.

Five were famously offered songs that turned out to be huge hits for Britney Spears and NSYNC. In 1997 Max Martin was working on the song "...Baby One More Time". It was originally written for the Backstreet Boys, and was turned down; it was later also passed on by TLC. Simon Cowell offered Martin an Aston Martin luxury vehicle if Martin would give the song to Five. Five initially began writing verses, however, Martin had promised the song to up-and-coming Britney Spears. In keeping his word, the finished song went to Spears. Five were later offered "Bye Bye Bye" by Martin, with the only completed line being "ain't no lie baby, bye bye bye." Upon hearing the song and attempting to write verses, Scott Robinson noted it sounded more like an NSYNC song than a Five song. The group passed on the song.

=== 1999–2000: Invincible ===
In August 1999, the first single of their second album, Invincible, "If Ya Gettin' Down", was released and became a major hit worldwide but yet again failed to go to number 1 in their home country, kept out of the top spot by Ricky Martin. Finally, in October 1999, after three consecutive number-two peaks, "Keep On Movin'" became their first UK number 1, as well as their biggest-selling single to date. The second album hit the top five shortly thereafter. "Don't Wanna Let You Go" was released in early March 2000, peaking at number 9. On 3 March 2000 Five opened at the BRIT Awards with rock band Queen, performing an updated version of the latter's hit "We Will Rock You". That night, Five won their first BRIT Award, as Best Pop Act, and their cover of the Queen song went on to become their second number 1 in the UK in July 2000.

The first half of 2000 found Five on a successful world tour, performing concerts in the UK, Europe, Russia, Australasia and — as a foursome — South America, after Neville contracted chickenpox and had to be flown back to England. After finishing the tour, Five continued to perform at many concerts in the UK, including Party in the Park with Queen. A re-issue of Invincible included remixed versions of a couple of songs and five live tracks from their tour, as well as a bonus track, "Don't Fight It Baby". Due for release in July 2000 in the US, the song was pulled from release after the group was dropped by their stateside label, Arista Records. Five also had problems with their Asian record company, and cancelled their Asian tour. Suffering from this major blow, the lads headed back to the studio and started writing songs for their next album. They continued to win awards in the UK and Europe, and in December 2000 launched their second big tour, in their home country.

=== 2001: Kingsize and split ===
In January 2001 Five performed at Rock in Rio in Brazil to an audience of almost 500,000 people. By May 2001, their third album Kingsize was completed. The following month, the group began a promotional campaign for the album's first single, "Let's Dance". On 9 July the group announced Sean Conlon had contracted glandular fever and would be taking time off from the group for at least four weeks. The other four members continued promotional activities in his stead; Conlon later revealed he was not suffering from fever but from a stress-induced mental breakdown caused by conflict within the group. In the video for "Let's Dance", recorded in mid-July, a life-size cardboard cut-out of Conlon was used in his place. "Let's Dance" was released commercially in mid-August, and became their third UK number 1, holding the top spot for two weeks. On 23 August, the group cancelled several planned promotional performances after Ritchie Neville damaged his Achilles tendon. The group also noted the continued absence of Conlon, adding he was suffering from "physical and mental exhaustion". Kingsize was released on 28 August and debuted at number three, going on to achieve gold status.

On 27 September 2001 the group announced they would be splitting. On 22 October the group released their final single from Kingsize, a double A-side single with "Closer to Me" and "Rock the Party". On 19 November Greatest Hits was released with 15 past hits, two remixes and one new song.

=== 2006–2007: First reunion ===
On 17 September 2006 an announcement was made via Five's official Myspace page that a press conference was to be held at The Scala in central London on 27 September. After a venue change due to a shooting at the Scala, the conference was moved to the Bar Academy Islington. It was confirmed at the press conference that four of the five members would be reuniting (Conlon now being committed to his Sony deal). Five recorded new material for their fourth album, working with Guy Chambers, Swedish producer/songwriter Anders Bagge, and French DJs Trak Invaders. They also planned to tour in 2007. By January 2007, Five had completed half of their album and were looking to be signed to a record label with new manager Richard Beck, who also secured MTV documentary series Five - The Revive. The album was expected to be released within the next few months. On 8 March 2007 Five premiered one-minute clips of three brand-new songs via their MySpace page. On 19 May 2007, having failed to secure a lucrative enough record deal, the group announced via their website they would no longer be pursuing a comeback.

=== 2012–2024: Second reunion, Love's departure and Time ===
In 2012, Conlon reunited with his former bandmates to discuss the possibility of a second reunion. The return was announced on 18 October as a four-piece without Brown, who later stated he declined to participate, due to privacy concerns. In 2013, the group took part in the ITV2 documentary series The Big Reunion. This was followed by the collaborative Big Reunion tour that May. On 16 September 2013, the band picked up the award for Best Music Act (On a Reality TV Show) at the National Reality TV Awards. In November and December 2013 Five embarked on their own tour in UK and Australia, the 5ive Greatest Hits Tour. Love announced that he had left the group in August 2014 via Twitter, without telling the other members beforehand. In February 2016 Five released the compilation Keep On Movin' – The Best of Five.

In April 2019 the group announced they would be joined by 911, Damage and A1 for a tour of the UK called The Boys Are Back! in 2020. Robinson also stated there was no chance of the band's original full line-up returning. He told the Press Association: "It wouldn't be down to us to reach out to [Brown and Love]. They've made it very clear they didn't want to be in the band. It's like Take That, with Jason Orange and Robbie Williams leaving. It still works, the songs are still the same." The tour was interrupted by the COVID-19 pandemic, and shows were rescheduled for 2021.

In late 2020 Five announced they would be embarking on another Australian Greatest Hits tour in 2021 supported by Australian pop duo Sister2Sister. On 11 June 2021 Five released "Keep On Movin' (21 Remix)". On 6 August 2021, Five released two promotional singles, "Shangri-La" and "Making Me Fall". On 1 October they released the single "Warm Light". Five released their fourth album, Time on 28 January 2022. Robinson told NME: "We always said we wouldn't do new music, which came from a fear of competing with our former selves. But when the pandemic hit and all our live dates were cancelled, the timing felt right. We're really happy with it and from my personal view, it's the album I'm proudest of."

On 5 March 2024 the group began embarking on an Australian Greatest Hits Tour.

=== 2025: Third reunion and comeback tour ===
On 24 February 2025 Love posted on Twitter he was once again part of the group after leaving in 2014. The next day, J Brown made a similar post, implying he had also rejoined the group. On 27 February 2025 the group confirmed their reunion as a five-piece, and announced the Keep On Movin' Tour, which would take place across the UK from October to December 2025. Naughty Boy was originally announced as the supporting act but, after missing the first show in Cardiff on 29 October, he withdrew from the tour for health reasons and was replaced by MistaJam for the remainder of the UK tour dates.

Plans for a reunion began when Robinson rented an Airbnb in Birmingham in 2023. "It was about being friends again. Reconnecting," he told The Guardian. "By going back into the public domain as the five of us and confronting our fears, our demons, both individually and collectively, it's a genuine healing process," Neville continued. "We hadn't been in the same room for 20-odd years."

On 22 August 2025 the group announced an Australian leg for the Keep On Movin' Tour, with five dates to take place in Australia and New Zealand in May 2026.

== Members ==
- Abz Love – vocals, rap
  (1997–2001, 2006–2007, 2012–2014, 2025–present)
- Scott Robinson – vocals
  (1997–2001, 2006–2007, 2012–present)
- Ritchie Neville – vocals
  (1997–2001, 2006–2007, 2012–present)
- Sean Conlon – vocals
  (1997–2001, 2012–present)
- Jason "J" Brown – vocals, rap
  (1997–2001, 2006–2007, 2025–present)

== Discography ==
- Five (1998)
- Invincible (1999)
- Kingsize (2001)
- Time (2022)

== Tours ==
Headlining

- Everybody Get Up with 5ive (1999)
- Invincible Tour (2000–2001)
- 5ive Greatest Hits Tour (2013)
- Loud and Intimate Tour (2015)
- 5ive Tour (2016)
- Australian Greatest Hits Tour (2024)
- Keep on Movin' Tour (2025–2026)

Co-headlining

- The Big Reunion Tour (with Atomic Kitten, Liberty X, B*Witched, Honeyz and 911) (2013)
- Christmas Party Tour (with Atomic Kitten, Liberty X, B*Witched, Honeyz and 911) (2013)
- The Big Reunion: Boy Band Tour (with Blue, 911, Damage, A1, 3T and 5th Story) (2014)
- The Boys Are Back Tour (with 911 , A1 and Damage) (2021–2022)
- 90s Baby! Pop Uk Tour (Oct 2022)

Opening act

- McBusted Tour (McFly) (2014)

== Awards ==
Awards won:

Brit Awards

- Best Pop Act – 2000

MTV Europe Music Awards

- The MTV Select Award – 1998

National Reality TV Awards

- Best Music Act (on a Reality TV Show) – 2013

Silver Clef Awards

- Best Newcomer – 2000

Smash Hits Poll Winners Party

- Best New Act – 1997
- Best Haircut (Scott Robinson) – 1997, 1998, 1999
- Best British Band – 1998, 1999, 2000
- Best Album – 1998
- Best Cover – 1998

TMF Awards (Netherlands)

- Best Single – 2000
- Best Album – 2000
- Best International Group – 2000

TV Hits Awards

- Best New Band – 1999
- Best Single ("We Will Rock You" (Queen cover)) – 2000

== See also ==
- List of 1990s one-hit wonders in the United States
- List of UK Singles Chart number ones of the 1990s
- List of UK Singles Chart number ones of the 2000s
