= Got the Feelin' =

1998 single by Five

Single by Five

from the album Five
- B-side: "Coming Back for More"
- Released: 2 June 1998
- Length: 3:28
- Label: RCA; BMG
- Songwriters: Richard Stannard; Julian Gallagher; Jason "J" Brown; Sean Conlon; Abs Breen
- Producers: Richard Stannard; Julian Gallagher

Five singles chronology
"When the Lights Go Out" (1998)	"Got the Feelin'" (1998)	"Everybody Get Up" (1998)

Music video
- "Got the Feelin'" on YouTube

"Got the Feelin'" is a song by English boy band Five. It was released on 2 June 1998 by RCA and BMG as the third single from their self-titled debut album (1998). It was written by Richard Stannard and Julian Gallagher along with band members Jason "J" Brown, Sean Conlon and Abs Breen, and it was produced by Denniz Pop and Jake Schulze. The song became a hit, peaking at No. 3 in the United Kingdom, No. 2 in New Zealand, No. 4 in Ireland, and No. 6 in Australia. It was also successful in several mainland European countries.

== Chart performance ==
"Got the Feelin'" reached a peak position of No. 3 on the UK Singles Chart, becoming the band's third top-ten single and their highest-charting single until the album's next single "Everybody Get Up" reached No. 2. "Got the Feelin'" debuted at No. 35 on the Australian ARIA Singles Chart and eventually peaked at No. 6, becoming the band's third consecutive top-ten hit. It was also a success across Europe and Oceania, having reached the top five in Flanders, Ireland, the Netherlands, and New Zealand, the top ten in Finland and Greece, and the top twenty in Sweden. The song received a gold sales status certification in the UK for the shipment of 400,000 copies and has sold 510,000 copies there as of February 2025.

== Music video ==
The video was shot in just four takes at a private swimming pool in Chatsworth Avenue. It was directed by duo Liam Kan & Grant Hodgson (credited to just 'Liam & Grant') who previously directed their video for "When the Lights Go Out". In a continuity error, Jason "J" Brown can be seen wearing a blue shirt whilst driving a car, but when he gets out of the car, he is wearing a grey shirt. Scott Robinson explained that this was because the wardrobe department lost the blue shirt and could not find another one in time.

== Track listings ==
UK CD1

1. "Got the Feelin'" (radio edit)
2. "Coming Back for More"
3. "Got the Feelin'" (extended)
4. "Got the Feelin'" (video)

UK CD2 (limited-edition single)

1. "Got the Feelin'" (radio edit)
2. "Got the Feelin'" (instrumental)
3. "When the Lights Go Out" (US remix)
4. Exclusive interview

UK cassette single and European CD single

1. "Got the Feelin'" (radio edit) – 3:28
2. "Got the Feelin'" (extended) – 5:20

Australian CD single

1. "Got the Feelin'" (radio edit)
2. "Got the Feelin'" (instrumental)
3. "Got the Feelin'" (extended)
4. "Coming Back for More"
5. "When the Lights Go Out" (US remix)

== Personnel ==
Personnel are lifted from the Five album booklet.

- Richard Stannard – writing, production
- Julian Gallagher – writing, production
- Jason "J" Brown – writing
- Sean Conlon – writing
- Abs Breen – writing
- Matt Sime – mixing, recording

== Charts ==
=== Weekly charts ===
Chart (1998–1999)	Peak position
Australia (ARIA)	6
Belgium (Ultratop 50 Flanders)	2
Belgium (Ultratop 50 Wallonia)	23
Estonia (Eesti Top 20)	1
Europe (Eurochart Hot 100)	21
Europe (European Hit Radio)	17
Finland (Suomen virallinen lista)	10
Germany (GfK)	86
Greece (IFPI)	8
Iceland (Íslenski Listinn Topp 40)	27
Ireland (IRMA)	4
Italy Airplay (Music & Media)	5
Netherlands (Dutch Top 40)	4
Netherlands (Single Top 100)	6
Netherlands Airplay (Music & Media)	13
New Zealand (Recorded Music NZ)	2
Scottish Singles Sales (Official Charts)	2
Spain Airplay (Top 40 Radio)	19
Sweden (Sverigetopplistan)	12
UK Singles (Official Charts)	3
UK Airplay (Music Week)	15

=== Year-end charts ===
Chart (1998)	Position
Belgium (Ultratop 50 Flanders)	51
Netherlands (Dutch Top 40)	54
Netherlands (Single Top 100)	61
New Zealand (RIANZ)	11
Sweden (Hitlistan)	86
UK Singles (OCC)	34

Chart (1999)	Position
Australia (ARIA)	70

== Certifications and sales ==
Region	Certification	Certified units/sales
Australia (ARIA)	Gold	35,000^{^}
Belgium (BRMA)	Gold	25,000^{*}
New Zealand (RMNZ)	Platinum	10,000^{*}
United Kingdom (BPI)	Gold	510,000
^{*} Sales figures based on certification alone.^{^} Shipments figures based on certification alone.

== Release history ==
Region	Date	Format(s)	Label(s)	Ref.
Sweden	2 June 1998	CD	RCA; BMG	
United Kingdom	8 June 1998	CD; cassette	RCA; BMG	
