= If Ya Gettin' Down =

1999 single by Five

Single by Five

from the album Invincible
- B-side: "When I Remember When"; "Everyday"
- Released: 19 July 1999
- Studio: Windmill Lane (Dublin, Ireland)
- Length: 2:59
- Label: RCA; BMG
- Songwriters: Richard Stannard; Julian Gallagher; Jason "J" Brown; Sean Conlon; Richard Breen; Michael Cleveland
- Producers: Richard Stannard; Julian Gallagher

Five singles chronology
"Until the Time Is Through" (1998)	"If Ya Gettin' Down" (1999)	"Keep On Movin'" (1999)

Music video
- "If Ya Gettin' Down" on YouTube

"If Ya Gettin' Down" is a single by English boy band Five. It was released on 19 July 1999 by RCA and BMG as the lead single from their second studio album, Invincible (1999). It was co-written by Richard Stannard, Julian Gallagher, and band members J Brown, Sean Conlon and Abs Breen, while Stannard and Gallagher produced it. Michael Cleveland is also credited as a writer since the track samples Indeep's 1982 song "Last Night a D.J. Saved My Life". "If Ya Gettin' Down" charted at number two in the United Kingdom and Australia and reached number one in New Zealand.

== Chart performance ==
The song reached number two in the United Kingdom, where it was certified gold for sales and streams of over 400,000 units. It was also certified platinum in Australia, where it reached number two. The song topped the charts in New Zealand and Scotland; it was their second number-one single in the former country.

== Track listings ==
UK, Irish and Australian CD1

1. "If Ya Gettin' Down"
2. "When I Remember When"
3. Enhanced CD

UK, Irish and Australian CD2

1. "If Ya Gettin' Down"
2. "Everyday"
3. Five fans' interview request line

UK cassette single and European CD single

1. "If Ya Gettin' Down" – 2:59
2. "When I Remember When" – 3:58

Japanese CD single

1. "If Ya Gettin' Down"
2. "When I Remember When"
3. "Everyday"

== Credits and personnel ==
Credits are lifted from the UK CD1 liner notes and the Invincible album booklet.

Studio

- Recorded at Windmill Lane Studios (Dublin, Ireland)

Personnel

- Richard Stannard – writing, production
- Julian Gallagher – writing, production
- Jason "J" Brown – writing
- Sean Conlon – writing
- Richard Breen – writing
- Michael Cleveland – writing ("Last Night a D.J. Saved My Life")
- Filo – backing vocals
- Mista Dexter – turntables
- Adrian Bushby – recording, mixing, engineering
- Conal Markey – recording assistance
- Pat McGovern – recording assistance

== Charts ==
=== Weekly charts ===
Chart (1999)	Peak position
Australia (ARIA)	2
Belgium (Ultratop 50 Flanders)	6
Belgium (Ultratop 50 Wallonia)	13
Estonia (Eesti Top 20)	19
Europe (Eurochart Hot 100)	8
Europe (European Hit Radio)	17
Germany (GfK)	17
Greece (IFPI)	10
Guatemala (El Siglo de Torreón)	4
Iceland (Íslenski Listinn Topp 40)	19
Ireland (IRMA)	4
Italy (FIMI)	4
Italy (Musica e dischi)	5
Italy Airplay (Music & Media)	2
Latvia (Latvijas Top 20)	17
Netherlands (Dutch Top 40)	6
Netherlands (Single Top 100)	6
Netherlands Airplay (Music & Media)	16
New Zealand (Recorded Music NZ)	1
Scottish Singles Sales (Official Charts)	1
Spain (Promusicae)	8
Spain Airplay (Top 40 Radio)	21
Sweden (Sverigetopplistan)	6
Switzerland (Schweizer Hitparade)	12
UK Singles (Official Charts)	2
UK Airplay (Music Week)	17

=== Year-end charts ===
Chart (1999)	Position
Australia (ARIA)	13
Belgium (Ultratop 50 Flanders)	49
Belgium (Ultratop 50 Wallonia)	64
Europe (Eurochart Hot 100)	78
Europe (European Hit Radio)	83
Italy (Musica e dischi)	38
Netherlands (Dutch Top 40)	63
Netherlands (Single Top 100)	47
New Zealand (RIANZ)	24
Romania (Romanian Top 100)	19
Sweden (Hitlistan)	62
UK Singles (OCC)	61

== Certifications and sales ==
Region	Certification	Certified units/sales
Australia (ARIA)	Platinum	70,000^{^}
New Zealand (RMNZ)	Gold	5,000^{*}
Sweden (GLF)	Gold	15,000^{^}
United Kingdom (BPI)	Gold	400,000^{‡}
^{*} Sales figures based on certification alone.^{^} Shipments figures based on certification alone.^{‡} Sales+streaming figures based on certification alone.

== Release history ==
Region	Date	Format(s)	Label(s)	Ref.
Sweden	19 July 1999	CD	RCA; BMG	
United Kingdom	19 July 1999	CD; cassette	RCA; BMG	
Japan	8 January 2000	CD	RCA; BMG	
