= Until the Time Is Through =

1998 single by Five

Single by Five

from the album Five
- B-side: "Five Megamix"; "Stop Pushing Me"
- Released: 16 November 1998
- Studio: Cheiron (Stockholm, Sweden)
- Length: 4:11
- Label: RCA; BMG
- Songwriters: Max Martin; Andreas Carlsson
- Producers: Max Martin; Kristian Lundin; Steve Mac (remix)

Five singles chronology
"It's the Things You Do" (1998)	"Until the Time Is Through" (1998)	"If Ya Gettin' Down" (1999)

Music video
- "Until the Time Is Through" on YouTube

"Until the Time Is Through" is a song by English boy band Five from their self-titled debut album (1998). Written by Max Martin and Andreas Carlsson and produced by Martin and Kristian Lundin, the ballad was released on 16 November 1998 as the album's sixth and final single, reaching number two in the United Kingdom and Spain, number three in Ireland, and number eight in Australia. The single version was remixed by Steve Mac and featured additional string orchestration by Richard Niles, features both Ritchie Neville and Scott Robinson on lead vocals, whereas the international and US album versions feature vocals solely from Robinson.

== Music video ==
The official music video, filmed at Mentmore Towers, was directed by Max and Dania. It was made for the radio edit version of the song.

== Track listings ==
- UK and Irish CD1
1. "Until the Time Is Through" (radio edit) – 4:11
2. "Five Megamix" – 5:46
3. Exclusive interview (part 1) – 4:44
- UK and Irish CD2
1. "Until the Time Is Through" (radio edit) – 4:11
2. "Stop Pushing Me" – 3:10
3. Exclusive interview (part 2) – 5:06
- UK cassette single
1. "Until the Time Is Through" (radio edit) – 4:11
2. "Five Megamix" – 5:46
3. Exclusive Christmas message – 0:30
- European CD single
1. "Until the Time Is Through" (radio edit) – 4:11
2. "Five Megamix" – 5:46
- Australian CD single
1. "Until the Time Is Through" (radio edit) – 4:11
2. "Stop Pushing Me" – 3:10
3. "Five Megamix" – 5:46
4. Exclusive interview – 6:39

== Credits and personnel ==
Credits are lifted from the single's liner notes.

Studio

- Recorded at Cheiron Studios (Stockholm, Sweden)

Personnel

- Max Martin – writing, production
- Andreas Carlsson – writing
- Kristian Lundin – production
- Steve Mac – remix, additional production
- Richard Niles – string orchestration
- Aliway (Ali Tennant and James Hector) – backing vocals
- Yvonne John Lewis – backing vocals
- Chris Laws – remix engineering
- Robin Sellars – remix engineering

== Charts ==
=== Weekly charts ===
Chart (1998–1999)	Peak position
Australia (ARIA)	8
Belgium (Ultratop 50 Flanders)	26
Europe (Eurochart Hot 100)	10
Europe (European Hit Radio)	25
Iceland (Íslenski Listinn Topp 40)	23
Ireland (IRMA)	3
Italy (Musica e dischi)	20
Netherlands (Dutch Top 40)	15
Netherlands (Single Top 100)	16
Netherlands Airplay (Music & Media)	25
New Zealand (Recorded Music NZ)	14
Poland Airplay (Music & Media)	19
Scottish Singles Sales (Official Charts)	3
Spain (Promusicae)	2
Spain Airplay (Top 40 Radio)	23
Sweden (Sverigetopplistan)	11
UK Singles (Official Charts)	2
UK Airplay (Music Week)	37

Chart (2025)	Peak position
UK Singles Downloads (Official Charts)	19
UK Singles Sales (OCC)	23

=== Year-end charts ===
Chart (1998)	Position
UK Singles (OCC)	67

Chart (1999)	Position
Netherlands (Dutch Top 40)	165

== Certifications and sales ==
Region	Certification	Certified units/sales
Sweden (GLF)	Gold	15,000^{^}
United Kingdom (BPI)	Silver	200,000^{^}
^{^} Shipments figures based on certification alone.

== Release history ==
Region	Date	Format(s)	Label(s)	Ref.
United Kingdom	16 November 1998	CD; cassette	RCA; BMG	
Sweden	23 November 1998	CD	RCA; BMG	
