= Slam Dunk (Da Funk) =

Single by Five

from the album Five
- B-side: "Straight Up Funk"
- Released: 1 December 1997
- Recorded: 1997
- Studio: Cheiron (Stockholm, Sweden)
- Genre: Pop; rap; funk
- Length: 3:38
- Label: RCA; BMG
- Songwriters: Denniz Pop; Max Martin; Herbie Crichlow; Jake
- Producers: Denniz Pop; Max Martin; Jake

Five singles chronology
"Slam Dunk (Da Funk)" (1997)	"When the Lights Go Out" (1998)

Music video
- "Slam Dunk (Da Funk)" on YouTube

"Slam Dunk (Da Funk)" is a song by British boy band Five, released in December 1997 as the first single from their self-titled debut album (1998). Featuring a blend of pop and rap, the single was written and produced by Denniz Pop, Max Martin, and Jake. It contains a sample of "Clap Your Hands" by Herbie Crichlow. The single reached number 10 on the UK Singles Chart and was certified silver. In the United States, it reached number 86 and was chosen as the NBA's theme song.

== Critical reception ==
Stephen Thomas Erlewine from AllMusic complimented the song as a "expertly constructed" single, that is "delivered professionally" by the group. He also declared it as "infectious, catchy, perfect for the radio." Larry Flick from Billboard magazine described it as a "funky-esque pure-pop ditty that tries to conjure a hipper, "streetier" vibe". Scottish Daily Record stated that the song is a "must tune for the office Christmas party". David Brinn from Jerusalem Post felt it "is typical of the sugar-coated white man's overbite rap that the boys churn out. Expect to know all their names soon." A reviewer from Music Week gave "Slam Dunk (Da Funk)" a full score of five out of five and named it Single of the Week, adding, "After months of careful preparation the new boy band emerge with a solid, storming funk/pop/rap song. A certain hit, but lacking the wide appeal of a Christmas number one." Dave Fawbert from ShortList commented, "Every single second of this – audio and video – is amazing, including some phenomenal ‘boyband walking down a corridor’ footage. Of course it was written by Max Martin like 97% of all amazing pop music ever."

== Music video ==
Two different music videos were made to promote the single; one for the UK and another for the US market.

== Performances ==
During the band's greatest hits tour in 2013, Scott Robinson and Abz Love changed the lyrics of the song. Instead of the first verse's line "when the 5 of us make 1", Robinson would sing "when the 4 of us make 1"; and the third verse's line "We got J, A.B., Rich, Sean and Scott" was changed to "We got Abz on the mic Rich, Sean and Scott", acknowledging the fact that Jason "J" Brown did not reunite with the band earlier in the year. Upon Love's departure from the group, Ritchie Neville changed the first verse's line to "when the 3 of us make 1"; while rapping duties were handed to Robinson, who changed the third verse's line once again to "We got Rich and Sean and Scott La rock".

== Track listings ==
- UK CD1
1. "Slam Dunk (Da Funk)" (Radio Edit) – 3:38
2. "Straight Up Funk" – 4:00
3. "Slam Dunk (Da Funk)" (Candy Girls Vocal Club Mix) – 6:31
4. "Slam Dunk (Da Funk)" (Video) – 3:41
- UK CD2
1. "Slam Dunk (Da Funk)" (Radio Edit) – 3:38
2. "Slam Dunk (Da Funk)" (Candy Girls Club Mix) – 5:16
3. "Slam Dunk (Da Funk)" (Future Funk Mix) – 6:35
4. "Slam Dunk (Da Funk)" (Sol Brothers Mix) – 8:57
5. "Slam Dunk (Da Funk)" (Bug Remix) – 6:36
- US CD single
1. "Slam Dunk (Da Funk)" (Radio Edit) – 3:38
2. "Slam Dunk (Da Funk)" (NBA Edit) – 2:30
- US CD maxi single
1. "Slam Dunk Da Funk" (Extended Mix) – 7:06
2. "Slam Dunk (Da Funk)" (Candy Girls Radio Mix) – 3:52
3. "Slam Dunk (Da Funk)" (Future Funk Radio Mix) – 4:30
4. "Slam Dunk (Da Funk)" (Sol Brothers Radio Mix) – 3:57
5. "Slam Dunk (Da Funk)" (Bug Remix) – 6:36
6. "Slam Dunk (Da Funk)" (NBA Edit) – 2:30
7. "When the Lights Go Out" (Loop Da Loop Full Vocal Mix) – 4:50

== Charts ==
=== Weekly charts ===
Chart (1997–1998)	Peak position
Belgium (Ultratop 50 Flanders)	6
Belgium (Ultratop 50 Wallonia)	14
Denmark (Tracklisten)	15
Estonia (Eesti Top 20)	18
Europe (Eurochart Hot 100)	42
Europe (European Hit Radio)	40
France Airplay (SNEP)	96
Germany (GfK)	77
Iceland (Íslenski Listinn Topp 40)	31
Ireland (IRMA)	24
Italy (Musica e dischi)	15
Italy Airplay (Music & Media)	17
Netherlands (Dutch Top 40)	10
Netherlands (Single Top 100)	22
Netherlands Airplay (Music & Media)	19
New Zealand (Recorded Music NZ)	22
Scottish Singles Sales (Official Charts)	13
Sweden (Sverigetopplistan)	28
UK Singles (Official Charts)	10
UK Airplay (Music Week)	22
US Billboard Hot 100	86
US Maxi-Singles Sales (Billboard)	21

=== Year-end charts ===
Chart (1997)	Position
UK Singles (OCC)	104

Chart (1998)	Position
Belgium (Ultratop 50 Flanders)	48

== Certifications and sales ==
Region	Certification	Certified units/sales
Belgium (BRMA)	Gold	25,000^{*}
United Kingdom (BPI)	Silver	200,000^{^}
^{*} Sales figures based on certification alone.^{^} Shipments figures based on certification alone.
