= Keep On Movin' (Five song) =

1999 single by Five

Single by Five

from the album Invincible
- B-side: "Inspector Gadget"; "Reminiscing"
- Released: 25 October 1999
- Studio: Windmill Lane (Dublin, Ireland)
- Genre: Pop
- Length: 3:17
- Label: RCA; BMG
- Songwriters: Richard Stannard; Julian Gallagher; Jason Brown; Sean Conlon; Richard Breen
- Producers: Richard Stannard; Julian Gallagher

Five singles chronology
"If Ya Gettin' Down" (1999)	"Keep On Movin'" (1999)	"Don't Wanna Let You Go" (2000)

Audio sample
- A sample from "Keep On Movin'" by Five: file; help

Music video
- "Keep On Movin'" on YouTube

"Keep On Movin'" is a song by British boy band Five. It was released on 25 October 1999 by RCA and BMG as the second single from their second studio album, Invincible (1999). It was co-written by Richard Stannard, Julian Gallagher, and band members J Brown, Sean Conlon and Abs Breen, while Stannard and Gallagher produced it. The song debuted at number one on the UK Singles Chart, becoming Five's first UK number-one single. "Keep On Movin'" received a double-platinum certification from the British Phonographic Industry (BPI) and is the group's highest-selling single in the UK, selling over 1.4 million units as of February 2025. "Keep On Movin'" also charted within the top 10 in several other countries, including Hungary, where it reached number one.

== Track listings ==
- UK and Australian CD1
1. "Keep On Movin'"
2. "Inspector Gadget"
3. Enhanced CD
- UK and Australian CD2
1. "Keep On Movin'"
2. "How Do Ya Feel" (Biffco remix)
3. "Reminiscing"
- UK cassette single and European CD single
1. "Keep On Movin'"
2. "Inspector Gadget"
- European maxi-CD single
1. "Keep On Movin'"
2. "How Do Ya Feel"
3. "Reminiscing"
4. "Inspector Gadget"
5. Enhanced CD
- Japanese CD single
1. "Keep On Movin'"
2. "Five Megamix"
3. "Reminiscing"

== Credits and personnel ==
Credits are taken from the UK CD1 liner notes.

Studios

- Recorded at Windmill Lane Studios (Dublin, Ireland)
- Additional production and mixing at Rokstone Studios (London, England)

Personnel

- Richard Stannard – writing, production
- Julian Gallagher – writing, production
- Jason "J" Brown – writing (as Jason Brown)
- Abz Love – writing (as Richard Breen)
- Sean Conlon – writing
- Filo – backing vocals
- Sharon Murphy – backing vocals
- Mista Dexter – turntable
- John Themis – guitar
- Steve Mac – keyboard, additional production and mix
- Chris Laws – drums, additional programming
- Adrian Bushby – recording, mixing
- Jake Davies – Pro Tools, mixing
- Conal Markey – mixing assistant
- Alvin Sweeney – mixing assistant
- Matt Howe – engineering
- Daniel Pursey – assistant engineering
- Form – artwork design
- Valerie Phillips – photograph

== Charts ==
=== Weekly charts ===
Weekly chart performance
Chart (1999–2000)	Peak position
Australia (ARIA)	6
Belgium (Ultratop 50 Flanders)	6
Belgium (Ultratop 50 Wallonia)	23
Czech Republic (IFPI)	3
Denmark (IFPI)	9
Estonia (Eesti Top 20)	6
Europe (Eurochart Hot 100)	9
Europe (European Hit Radio)	3
Finland (Suomen virallinen lista)	6
Germany (GfK)	21
Hungary (Mahasz)	1
Iceland (Íslenski Listinn Topp 40)	20
Ireland (IRMA)	2
Italy (FIMI)	1
Italy (Musica e dischi)	2
Italy Airplay (Music & Media)	3
Latvia (Latvijas Top 30)	21
Netherlands (Dutch Top 40)	3
Netherlands (Single Top 100)	5
Netherlands Airplay (Music & Media)	8
New Zealand (Recorded Music NZ)	7
Scottish Singles Sales (Official Charts)	1
Spain (Promusicae)	6
Spain Airplay (Top 40 Radio)	5
Sweden (Sverigetopplistan)	10
Switzerland (Schweizer Hitparade)	36
UK Singles (Official Charts)	1
UK Airplay (Music Week)	5

Chart (2025)	Peak position
UK Singles Sales (OCC)	68

=== Year-end charts ===
Annual chart rankings
Chart (1999)	Position
Australia (ARIA)	72
Europe (Eurochart Hot 100)	79
Italy (Musica e dischi)	17
Netherlands (Dutch Top 40)	53
Netherlands (Single Top 100)	77
Sweden (Hitlistan)	64
UK Singles (OCC)	36

Chart (2000)	Position
Brazil (Crowley)	31
UK Airplay (Music Week)	45

== Certifications and sales ==
Certifications and sales
Region	Certification	Certified units/sales
Australia (ARIA)	Platinum	70,000^{^}
New Zealand (RMNZ)	Platinum	30,000^{‡}
Sweden (GLF)	Gold	15,000^{^}
United Kingdom (BPI)	2× Platinum	1,400,000
^{^} Shipments figures based on certification alone.^{‡} Sales+streaming figures based on certification alone.

== Release history ==
Region	Date	Format(s)	Label(s)	Ref.
Sweden	25 October 1999	CD	RCA; BMG	
United Kingdom	25 October 1999	CD; cassette	RCA; BMG	
Japan	23 March 2000	CD	RCA; BMG	
