= When the Lights Go Out (song) =

1998 single by British boy band Five

Single by Five

from the album Five
- B-side: "Slam Dunk (Da Funk)" (extended mix)
- Released: 2 March 1998
- Studio: Steelworks (Sheffield, England)
- Genre: Pop
- Length: 4:11
- Label: RCA; BMG
- Songwriters: Eliot Kennedy; Tim Lever; Mike Percy; John McLaughlin; Five
- Producers: Eliot Kennedy; Tim Lever; Mike Percy

Five singles chronology
"Slam Dunk (Da Funk)" (1997)	"When the Lights Go Out" (1998)	"Got the Feelin'" (1998)

Music videos
- "When the Lights Go Out" on YouTube; "When the Lights Go Out" (US version) on YouTube

"When the Lights Go Out" is the second single released from British group Five's self-titled debut album (1998). It was released in early 1998, by RCA and BMG. The song was co-written by the group alongside Eliot Kennedy, Tim Lever and Mike Percy (from the band Dead or Alive), and John McLaughlin. It was co-produced by Kennedy, Lever and Percy, with the US version receiving additional production from Cutfather & Joe.

"When the Lights Go Out" is the band's only top ten hit in the United States. An alternate version of the song, in which J's rap is replaced by Abz's rap, was made exclusively for the US release; there are separate videos for each version. Five's biggest hit to date internationally, "When the Lights Go Out" is considered somewhat to be their debut single in most countries (except in the UK), peaking at number two in Australia, reaching the top 30 in the US on 23 June 1998 and eventually spending seven nonconsecutive weeks at its peak of number 10, starting 21 July 1998. The song also spent a total of six months on the US Billboard Hot 100, and sold 800,000 copies in the US alone.

== Critical reception ==
Larry Flick from Billboard magazine wrote, "Does pop radio need yet another clique of young, videogenic harmonizers? The answer was a resounding no ... until the onset of Five, a UK quintet of cuties who swagger with undeniably sharp vocal precision and an appealing degree of soul. "When the Lights Go Out" chugs with faux-funk authority and a crackling pop chorus. You will be irreversibly hooked on this tasty guilty pleasure long before the track reaches its conclusion. Voted best new act of 1997 by the teenybopper readers of Smash Hits in the UK, Five are the first real reason the Backstreet Boys have had to look over their shoulders in a serious sweat." In a 2021 retrospective review, Can't Stop the Pop said that with the song, "Five demonstrated a sense of personality, identity and charisma far beyond that of just good marketing."

A reviewer from Music Week gave the song three out of five, noting that the follow-up to "Slam Dunk (Da Funk)" "is a slower blend of hip-hop, soul and rap and should be destined for the Top 10." The magazine's Alan Jones felt that "its jack swing-ish backing track probably doesn't bring out the best from a fair tune, and their rapping seems little more than perfunctory. They're probably hot enough to get away with it, but more inspiration will be needed next time." In 2020, Rolling Stone ranked "When the Lights Go Out" number 67 in their list of "75 Greatest Boy Band Songs of All Time".

== Music videos ==
The UK version (directed by duo Liam & Grant) starts with a woman using a VR machine and sees the members as they dance together and in separate rooms with each getting a distinct color: Abs in teal, Scott in orange, Ritchie in purple, Sean in blue and J in red. Through the woman's perspective, the viewers sees the members with a given number and their horoscope sign, respectively.

The US version (directed by Nigel Dick) takes place at night in a closed bowling alley, where Abs takes control of the place and allows the other members and himself to hang out with a couple girls they brought along with them. One of the girls is played by Bethany Joy Lenz of Guiding Light and One Tree Hill fame.

== Track listings ==
- UK CD1
1. "When the Lights Go Out" (radio edit)
2. "When the Lights Go Out" (extended mix)
3. "When the Lights Go Out" (The Drummers mix)
4. "When the Lights Go Out" (Loop Da Loop full vocal mix)
5. "When the Lights Go Out" (video)
- UK CD2
1. "When the Lights Go Out" (radio edit)
2. "When the Lights Go Out" (Blacksmith R&B rub)
3. "Slam Dunk (Da Funk)" (extended mix)
4. Interview
- UK cassette single
1. "When the Lights Go Out" (radio edit)
2. "When the Lights Go Out" (extended mix)
- European CD single
1. "When the Lights Go Out" (radio edit)
2. "When the Lights Go Out" (Blacksmith R&B rub)
- US CD and cassette single
1. "When the Lights Go Out" (US remix) – 4:20
2. "Straight Up Funk" – 3:57
- US maxi-CD single
1. "When the Lights Go Out" (US remix) – 4:20
2. "When the Lights Go Out" (hip hop mix) – 6:19
3. "When the Lights Go Out" (R&B rub mix) – 4:24
4. "Shake" – 3:25
- US 12-inch single

A1. "When the Lights Go Out" (radio mix)
A2. "When the Lights Go Out" (R&B rub mix)
B1. "When the Lights Go Out" (hip hop mix)
B2. "Shake"

- Australian CD single
1. "When the Lights Go Out" (radio edit)
2. "When the Lights Go Out" (extended mix)
3. "When the Lights Go Out" (Blacksmith R&B rub)
4. "When the Lights Go Out" (The Drummers mix)
5. "When the Lights Go Out" (Loop Da Loop full vocal mix)

Note: The Japanese CD single contains a sixth track: a shorter radio edit of "When the Lights Go Out".

== Credits and personnel ==
Credits are lifted from the Five album booklet.

Studio

- Recorded at Steelworks Studios (Sheffield, England)

Personnel

- Eliot Kennedy – writing, production, mixing
- Tim Lever – writing, production, mixing
- Mike Percy – writing, production, mixing
- John McLaughlin – writing
- Five – writing

== Charts ==
=== Weekly charts ===
Chart (1998)	Peak position
Australia (ARIA)	2
Belgium (Ultratop 50 Flanders)	13
Belgium (Ultratop 50 Wallonia)	8
Canada (Nielsen SoundScan)	10
Canada Top Singles (RPM)	30
Canada Dance/Urban (RPM)	23
Estonia (Eesti Top 20)	1
Europe (Eurochart Hot 100)	19
Europe (European Hit Radio)	28
Iceland (Íslenski Listinn Topp 40)	28
Ireland (IRMA)	11
Italy Airplay (Music & Media)	20
Netherlands (Dutch Top 40)	32
Netherlands (Single Top 100)	35
New Zealand (Recorded Music NZ)	20
Scottish Singles Sales (Official Charts)	4
Spain (AFYVE)	7
Spain Airplay (Top 40 Radio)	21
Sweden (Sverigetopplistan)	7
UK Singles (Official Charts)	4
UK Airplay (Music Week)	17
US Billboard Hot 100	10
US Mainstream Top 40 (Billboard)	14
US Rhythmic Top 40 (Billboard)	29
US CHR/Pop Top 50 (Radio & Records)	15
US CHR/Rhythmic (Radio & Records)	31

=== Year-end charts ===
Chart (1998)	Position
Australia (ARIA)	25
Belgium (Ultratop 50 Flanders)	76
Belgium (Ultratop 50 Wallonia)	50
Sweden (Hitlistan)	67
UK Singles (OCC)	88
US Billboard Hot 100	38
US Mainstream Top 40 (Billboard)	36
US CHR/Pop (Radio & Records)	38
US CHR/Rhythmic (Radio & Records)	94

== Certifications and sales ==
Region	Certification	Certified units/sales
Australia (ARIA)	Platinum	70,000^{^}
Belgium (BRMA)	Gold	25,000^{*}
United Kingdom (BPI)	Silver	200,000^{^}
United States (RIAA)	Gold	800,000
^{*} Sales figures based on certification alone.^{^} Shipments figures based on certification alone.

== Release history ==
Region	Date	Format(s)	Label(s)	Ref.
United Kingdom	2 March 1998	CD; cassette	RCA; BMG	
Sweden	16 March 1998	CD	RCA; BMG	
United States	April 1998	Radio	Arista	
Japan	1 July 1998	CD	RCA; BMG	
