= Ritchie Neville =

British pop singer

- Born: Richard Gary Neville Dobson; 23 August 1979 (age 47)
- Origin: Solihull, England
- Genre: Pop
- Occupation: Singer
- Years active: 1997–present
- Member of: Five

Richard Neville Dobson (born 23 August 1979) is an English singer from Solihull, England. He is most noted for being a member of the boy band Five.

== Career ==
In 1997, Neville auditioned for Five, a new boy band-style group with "attitude and edge" and was eventually selected to be part of the group along with Abz Love, Scott Robinson, Sean Conlon and Jason "J" Brown. Five subsequently were signed by Simon Cowell and BMG/RCA for a six-album deal. Five went on to enjoy worldwide success selling over 20 million records in their four years. The group sold around 20 million copies worldwide. Five disbanded on 27 September 2001. Afterwards he was offered a solo deal by Simon Cowell. In 2006 Five attempted a comeback without Conlon, but failed to sign with a new label and the group disbanded again.

In January 2013, Five returned to appear the ITV2's reality show The Big Reunion. Brown was unwilling to rejoin the group and Five announced that they were considering a new fifth member for the comeback, but withdrew to continue with the original four-member lineup. The group eventually decided to continue as a four-piece, until Abz Love also left in June 2014, leaving them as a trio.

In February 2025, Love and Brown both announced their return to Five, marking the first time the original lineup had been together in 24 years.

== Personal life ==
From 1998 to May 2000, Neville dated actress Billie Piper. The couple lived together in an apartment on the Edgware Road, London.

In 2004, Neville moved to Australia and worked as a sommelier. In 2007, he opened a restaurant in Sydney named Guerrilla Bar and Restaurant to critical acclaim in various media. The restaurant was sold in March 2016.

In 2008, Neville dated and later married Australian model and DJ Emily Scott. They married in the town of Henley-on-Thames on 23 October 2008. They moved to Sydney, Australia, following their wedding, they separated four months later. Their relationship only became public knowledge when Scott confirmed on 28 June 2009 that New South Wales police had taken out an interim Apprehended Violence Order (AVO) for the allegations on Neville until the matter was heard in a court. Scott alleged she has a scar above her left eye that was caused by a glass hitting her. However, the case was dismissed in Manly Magistrates Court on 30 July 2009 and Neville was acquitted.

Neville started dating Atomic Kitten singer Natasha Hamilton in 2013. On 23 April 2014, they announced they were expecting their first child together. Hamilton gave birth to a baby girl, Ella Rose, on 23 September 2014. Neville and Hamilton split in March 2016.

On 13 June 2025, he announced his engagement to an unnamed woman, proposing to her during a trip to Italy.

== Filmography ==
=== Television ===
Year	Title	Role	Notes
1999	Al salir de clase	Himself	Episode: "Falso Culpable"
2004	The Last Detective	Gerry Jameson (young)	Episode: "Three Steps to Hendon"
2004	The Farm	Contestant	Series 1
2008	Cirque de Celebrité	Contestant	Series 2
2013	The Big Reunion	Himself	Series 1
2014	The Jump	Contestant	Series 1
2015	Hardy Bucks	Himself	Series 3
