= Sean Conlon =

English singer (born 1981)

- Born: Sean Kieran Conlon; 20 May 1981 (age 45); Leeds, West Yorkshire, England
- Genres: Pop
- Occupations: Singer; songwriter
- Instruments: Vocals; piano
- Years active: 1997–2002; 2006–present
- Member of: Five

Sean Kieran Conlon (born 20 May 1981) is an English singer and songwriter. He is best known as a member of boy band Five.

== Early life ==
Conlon was born in Leeds, West Yorkshire, of Irish and Trinidadian descent and has a brother and two sisters. He grew up in Horsforth and attended St Mary's RC Primary School and St. Mary's Catholic High School, Menston. As a child, his interests lay in becoming a record producer of soul music or playing rugby. He had his first recording session aged eleven and, at the age of thirteen, performed for Harvey Goldsmith, Richard Skinner and Phil Collins after winning Yamaha's Young Composer Competition.

== Career ==
In 1997, Conlon auditioned for Five, a new boy band-style group with "attitude and edge". He was eventually selected to be part of the band along with Abz Love, Ritchie Neville, Scott Robinson and Jason "J" Brown. Five subsequently were signed by Simon Cowell and BMG/RCA for a six-album deal. Five went on to enjoy massive success worldwide, selling over 20 million records in their four years. During the release of the third album, Kingsize, Conlon had a mental breakdown from stress and depression; the music video for the single "Let's Dance" featured a cardboard cutout of him. He later admitted that having originally been "very confident and very outgoing" when the band started, he "became the insecure one" and "let the external environment destroy [him]". On 27 September 2001, the group announced that they would be splitting.

Afterwards, Conlon took a long hiatus from his artistic career, turning down the chance to be part of Five's attempted reunion in 2006, which was aborted after eight months.

In March 2012, Conlon auditioned for the first series of The Voice UK, but he did not make it through to the next round as no coach chose him. In January 2013, Five returned to star the ITV2's reality show The Big Reunion. Brown didn't want to rejoin the group and Five announced that they were considering a new fifth member for the comeback, but withdrew to continue with the original four-member lineup. Love later quit the band as well, leaving Conlon, Neville and Robinson as a trio.

In February 2025, Brown and Love both rejoined Five, marking the return of the original lineup for the first time in 24 years.

== Personal life ==
In Five's earlier days, Conlon was briefly engaged to dancer Suzanne Mole, who toured with the group. In 2013, Conlon stated that he was married to a woman who prefers to remain anonymous. On 15 January 2014, it was announced that they were expecting their first child "any time soon". The following week, they welcomed their first child, a daughter. In interviews with the Daily Mail and Heat in March 2025, Conlon stated that he and his wife had separated and that he is now a single father of two.

On 3 September 2006, Conlon participated in a charity football match at the Brandywell Stadium in Derry.

Conlon's father Dennis died on 28 April 2023.

== Songwriting credits ==
Title	Year	Artist	Album
"Don't Let It Get You Down"	2006	Mike Leon Grosch	Absolute
"Let Your Wall Fall Down"	2010	Boyzone	Brother
"Say What I Feel"	2011	The Overtones	Good Ol' Fashioned Love
"Liefde Huilt, Liefde Lacht"	2015	Sugarfree	Samen Sterk
