= Scott Robinson (singer) =

English singer (born 1979)

- Born: Scott James Robinson; 22 November 1979 (age 46)
- Origin: Essex, England
- Occupations: Singer; Rapper; Radio presenter; Podcaster
- Instrument: Vocals
- Years active: 1997–present
- Member of: Five

Scott James Robinson (born 22 November 1979) is an English singer and radio presenter. He is best known for being a member of the boy band Five. He currently presents the Drivetime show on Radio Essex.

== Early life ==
Robinson and his two sisters, Nicola and Hayley, lived in Pitsea, Essex. He attended Chalvedon Comprehensive School until year 9 when he left to move full-time to the Sylvia Young Theatre School.

He enjoyed initial acting success with small parts in Casualty, Hale and Pace, The Bill and EastEnders. Scott also performed on stage in London's West End and the Edinburgh Festival with Ron Moody in Peter Pan and in the National Youth Music Theatre Production of Whistle Down the Wind before turning his attention to music with Five.

== Career ==
In 1997, Robinson auditioned for Five, a new boy band-style group with "attitude and edge". Robinson was eventually selected to be part of the band along with Abz Love, Ritchie Neville, Sean Conlon and Jason "J" Brown. Five subsequently were signed by Simon Cowell and BMG/RCA for a six-album deal. Five went on to enjoy massive success worldwide, selling over 20 million records in their four years. The group sold around 20 million copies worldwide. The band split up on 27 September 2001.

From 2002 to 2012, Robinson worked as a radio presenter on Essex FM. From 2004 to 2005 he starred in the UK regional theatre musical Boogie Nights 2. In 2006 Five attempted a comeback without Conlon, but failed to sign with a new label and the band disbanded again. In October 2008, Robinson appeared in Celebrity Scissorhands which coincides with the BBC charity Children in Need. From 2012 to 2013, Robinson was a regular on Soccer AM, presenting the Scott Awards.

In January 2013, Five returned to star the ITV2's reality show The Big Reunion. Brown didn't want to rejoin the group and Five announced that they were considering a new fifth member for the comeback, but withdrew to continue with the original four-member lineup. The band eventually decided to continue as a four-piece and they have been performing live touring Europe ever since. In November 2024, Robinson appeared on BBC retrospective Boybands Forever along with Neville and Conlon. The three-part series documented the rise of the boyband industry in 1990s Britain.

== Personal life ==
Robinson began dating Kerry Oaker in 1997. On 11 July 2001, Oaker gave birth five weeks early to their first son, Brennan Rhys Robinson. On 28 September 2001, the day after Five split up, Robinson and Oaker got married at Stock Brook Golf and Country Club in Billericay. The rest of the band were also in attendance. Their second son, Kavan, was born in 2006, followed by twin daughters, Bobbi-Rayne and Kaydi-Rose, in January 2014. The family currently live in Pitsea, Essex.

In February 2008, Robinson opened a celebrity memorabilia shop in Leigh-on-Sea.

He is a fan of Arsenal F.C.

== Radio ==
| Year | Title | Radio |
|---|---|---|
| 2002–2012 | Saturday Live | Radio Essex |
| 2012–2013 | Scott Awards | Soccer AM |
| 2020–present | The Big Drive Home | Radio Essex |

=== Podcasts ===
| Year | Title |
|---|---|
| 2015–2017 | The Three Show |
| 2021 | The A to Z of Men |

== Stage ==
| Year | Title | Role |
|---|---|---|
| 2004–2005 | Boogie Nights 2 | Bob |
