= Jason "J" Brown =

English singer and rapper (born 1976)

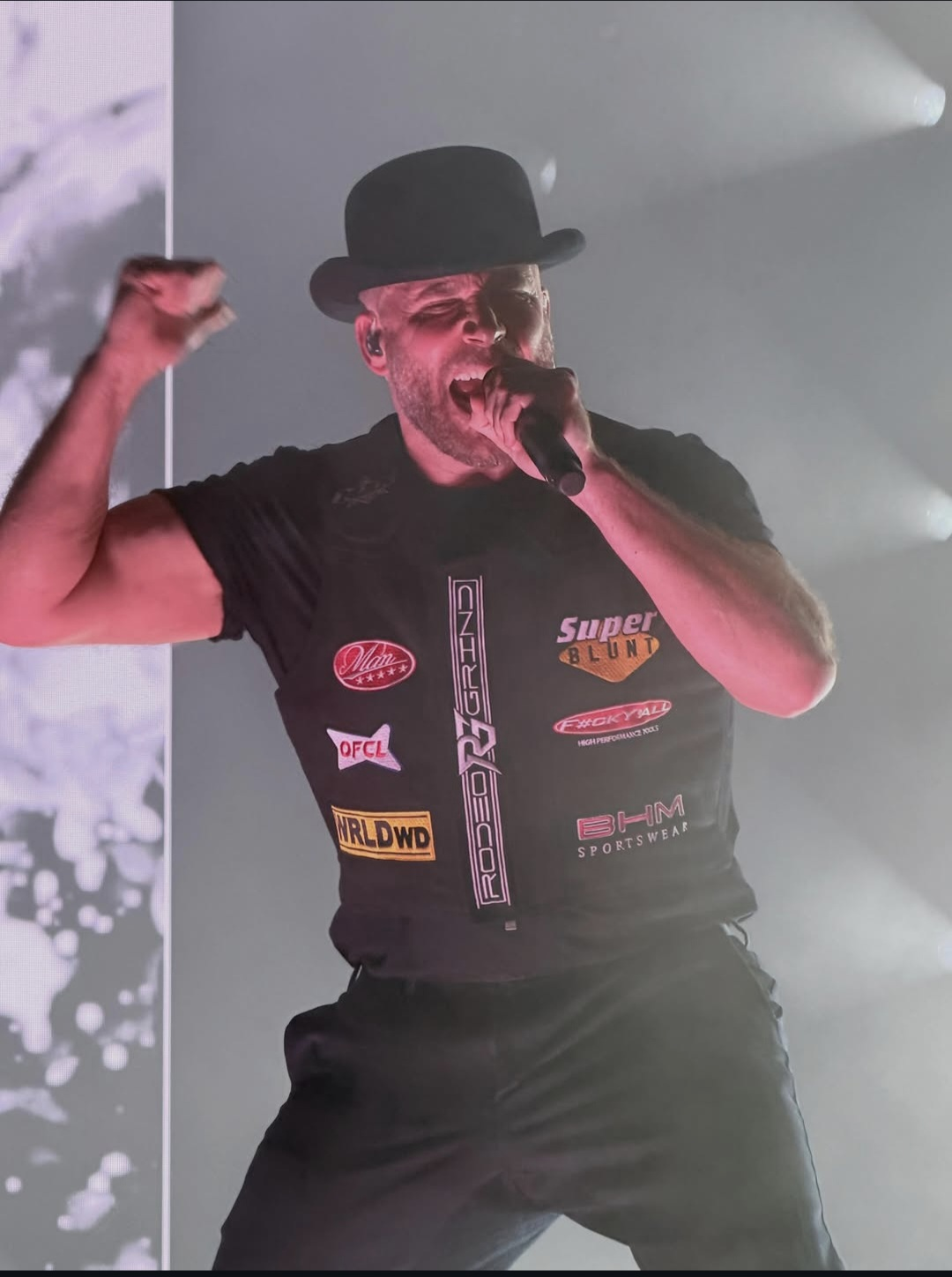
- Brown performing with Five in 2026

Background information
- Born: Jason Paul Brown; 13 June 1976 (age 50)
- Origin: Warrington, Cheshire, England
- Occupations: Singer; rapper; songwriter
- Instruments: Vocals; keyboards
- Years active: 1997–2007; 2025–present
- Member of: Five

Jason Paul "J" Brown (born 13 June 1976) is an English singer, rapper and songwriter. He is known as a member of boy band Five.

== Early life ==
Brown was born Jason Paul Brown on 13 June 1976 at the Cambridge Military Hospital in Aldershot. Due to his father's career in the military, his childhood was highly transient, requiring the family to relocate frequently; he lived in Germany, Canada, and various locations across the north of England.

The family eventually settled in Cheshire, where Brown spent his adolescence and early adult life residing in Warrington and Newton-le-Willows. He attended St James's Primary School and Sir Thomas Boteler High School in Warrington. Since his youth, Brown harbored strong aspirations to become a performer, frequently telling his school peers that he would eventually be famous. During his school years, he regularly entered dance competitions at the town's Parr Hall and began writing and producing his own music. He later formed a musical partnership with his best friend, Robert Belton, to record and produce demo tapes locally before successfully answering an audition advertisement for the boy band Five in March 1997.

== Career ==
In 1997, Brown auditioned for Five, a new boy band-style group with "attitude and edge", and was selected to join the lineup alongside Ritchie Neville, Scott Robinson, Sean Conlon, and Abs Breen (later Abz Love). The group subsequently signed a six-album deal with Simon Cowell and BMG/RCA, achieving massive worldwide success and selling over 20 million records over the next four years before officially announcing their disbandment on 27 September 2001.

During his time with the group, the intense pressure of fame and exhaustive scheduling severely impacted Brown's mental health, leading to clinical depression and chronic insomnia. Prior to his success and joining the band, he had attempted suicide by overdosing on painkillers. His mental health struggles worsened during the band's peak, culminating in a full mental breakdown on set during the 1999 filming of the music video for "Don't Wanna Let You Go". Following the 2001 split, Brown chose to completely exit the entertainment industry. While widespread internet rumours frequently claimed he pursued a degree in architecture, dedicated his time to global charity work, and participated in high-profile protests against the Iraq War, these claims remain unverified by Brown himself. Brown actually walked away from the public eye to live a quiet life focused on alternative lifestyle choices and philosophy.

In September 2006, Brown, Love, Neville and Robinson announced that they would reunite as Five as a four-piece without Conlon. During this eight-month period, the group collaborated on demos with notable producers and songwriters, including Guy Chambers, the Swedish songwriter Anders Bagge, and the French production team Trak Invaders. Despite this high-level production involvement and the group's effort to modernise their sound, they were unable to secure a commercial contract with a major record label. Consequently, in early 2007, the band announced that they were abandoning their reunion plans. The unreleased demos, including tracks such as "70 Days" and "It's All Good," were subsequently circulated online by the band's fanbase. Later in 2007, Brown participated in the seventh series of the ITV reality television programme I'm a Celebrity...Get Me Out of Here!, where he placed third in the competition.

In January 2013, Five returned to the public eye for the ITV2 reality documentary series The Big Reunion, this time with Conlon on board but without Brown, who declined to participate. Brown stated that decision not to take part was due to no longer feeling comfortable on stage or being a public figure, rather than animosity toward the group. During the initial broadcast, Robinson and Conlon accused Brown of overbearing and bullying behaviour during their peak years, with Conlon revealing that Brown had told him he disliked him from the moment he first heard him sing. Brown appeared in the follow-up series, The Big Reunion: On Tour, in September 2013 to address the claims directly. While expressing shock at the public narrative, he acknowledged that his intense behaviour could have been perceived as bullying. He explained that his aggressive outbursts stemmed from his own severe anxieties and fears, causing him to overcompensate due to being older and physically larger than the other members. He maintained that he never intentionally targeted or bullied anyone, but fully understood how his actions had overwhelmed his younger bandmates.

In early February 2025, the group wiped their official social media accounts to tease a major announcement. On 24 February 2025, Love announced his return to the group via Twitter, followed the next day by Brown confirming his own return, marking the official reunion of the full, original five-piece lineup for the first time since 2001. The band later confirmed they had quietly met 18 months prior to the public announcement to openly resolve their past conflicts, clear the air regarding the old bullying accusations, and repair their personal friendships before successfully launching their sold-out arena tour.

== Personal life ==
During the height of his fame in 2000, Brown was in a high-profile, on-off relationship with Spice Girls member Melanie Chisholm (Melanie C). Following Five's disbandment in 2001, Brown chose to lead a private life entirely outside of the public eye for over two decades. In recent reflections, Brown has described this period as one of solitude and distance from his former career, noting that he stepped away from the music industry to prioritise his mental health and personal growth before his eventual return to the group.

In a March 2025 interview with Heatworld discussing his return to the spotlight, Brown confirmed that he was single and had been for three years. However, during Five's performance at Trentham Live on 22 August 2026, he announced on stage that his partner, who remains unnamed, and dog were side-stage.

== Songwriting credits ==
Unlike many of their late-1990s contemporary pop groups, the members of Five frequently co-wrote their own material. Brown's musical background contributed to the lyrical structures and rap dynamics of the group's discography. He is an officially registered co-writer on several of the band's major commercial releases, album tracks, and UK number-one singles, frequently collaborating with songwriters and producers Richard "Biff" Stannard and Julian Gallagher.

=== From the album Five (1998) ===
- "When the Lights Go Out" (Single)
- "Got the Feelin'" (Single)
- "Switch"
- "Partyline"
- "Straight Up Funk"

=== From the album Invincible (1999) ===
- "If Ya Gettin' Down" (Single)
- "Keep On Movin'" (Single)
- "Don't Wanna Let You Go" (Single)
- "Invincible"
- "Serious"
- "How Do Ya Feel"
- "Battlestar"
- "Mr. Z"

=== From the album Kingsize (2001) ===
- "Let's Dance" (Single)
- "Closer to Me" (Single)
- "Rock the Party" (Single)
- "Hear Me Now"
- "Lay All Your Lovin' on Me"
- "C'mon C'mon"

== Filmography ==
Year	Title	Role	Notes
2007	I'm a Celebrity...Get Me Out of Here!	Contestant	Series 7
