= I Like It =

I Like It may refer to:

- "I Like It" (Cardi B, Bad Bunny and J Balvin song), 2018
- "I Like It" (DeBarge song), 1982
- "I Like It" (Dino song), 1989
- "I Like It" (Enrique Iglesias song), 2010
- "I Like It" (Foxy Shazam song), 2011
- "I Like It" (Gerry and the Pacemakers song), 1963
- "I Like It" (Narcotic Thrust song), 2004
- "I Like It" (Overweight Pooch song), 1991
- "I Like It" (Sammie song), 1999
- "I Like It" (The Blackout All-Stars song), 1994
- "I Like It (I Wanna Be Where You Are)", a 1995 song by Grand Puba
- I Like It, a 2011 EP by South Korean group ChoColat
- "I Like It", a song by Babymonster from the EP Choom (2026)
- "I Like It", a song by Cheryl from A Million Lights, 2012
- "I Like It", a song by Irving Berlin
- "I Like It", a song by Lacuna Coil from the album Shallow Life (2009)
- "I Like It", a song by Nëither which represented Washington, D.C., in American Song Contest
- "I Like It", a song by Rosita De La Vega
- "I Like It", a song by Silver Convention from the album Save Me (1975)
- "I Like It", a song by Sevyn Streeter
- "I Like It", a song by So Def, produced by Missy Elliott
- "I Like It", a song by Stray Kids from the EP Ate (2024)
- "I Like It", a song by Take That from III, 2014

== See also ==
- I Like (disambiguation)
- "I Like It, I Love It", a 1995 song by Tim McGraw
- I Like It Like That (disambiguation)
- I Love It (disambiguation)
