= Infinite Disco =

2020 livestream concert by Kylie Minogue supporting her album Disco

- Livestream concert by Kylie Minogue
- Venue: LH3 Studios (London, England)
- Associated album: Disco
- Dates: 7 November 2020 and 31 December 2020
- No. of shows: 2

Infinite Disco was a livestream concert by Australian singer-songwriter Kylie Minogue, held in support of her fifteenth studio album Disco (2020). It was broadcast on two dates in 2020 and was a joint-venture production by Driift and BMG Rights Management.

The livestream was announced on 19 October 2020, and a clip of Minogue singing "Magic" was released the same day. The concert was broadcast on 7 November 2020 and again on 31 December 2020 for New Year's Eve. Each broadcast was streamed four times both days to accommodate different time zones.

On 12 November 2021, the show was released on CD, DVD, and Blu-ray as part of the Guest List Edition of Disco. An LP version followed on 6 May 2022.

== Background and development ==
Following the release of the singles "Say Something" and "Magic", Minogue announced a livestream performance of songs from her album Disco to be broadcast on 7 November 2020, one day after the album's released. Tickets went on sale on 21 October 2020.

The fifty-minute pre-recorded performance was co-directed by Rob Sinclair and Kate Moross. It primarily showcased songs from Disco but also included singles from earlier in Minogue's career that were remixed to have a more disco sound by her longtime contributors Richard Stannard and Steve Anderson. The performance was choreographed by Ashley Wallen.

On 1 November 2020, Minogue uploaded her performance of "Say Something" from Infinite Disco to her YouTube channel. On 2 November 2020, Minogue shared a 30-second clip showcasing different parts of the performance, including portions of her singing her 2001 single "Love at First Sight" and "I Love It". On 6 November 2020, Minogue uploaded her performance of "Real Groove" from the show to her YouTube channel.

Nearly 30,000 tickets were sold for its initial broadcast.

== Setlist ==
1. Introduction (contains excerpts from "Magic" and "Come into My World")
2. "I Love It"
3. "In Your Eyes"
4. "Light Years" / "Supernova" / "Light Years" (Reprise)
5. Interlude (contains excerpts from "I Should Be So Lucky")
6. "Dance Floor Darling"
7. "All the Lovers" (performed with The House Gospel Choir)
8. "Say Something" (performed with The House Gospel Choir)
9. "Real Groove"
10. "Slow" (contains elements of "Love to Love You Baby")
11. "Monday Blues"
12. "Where Does the DJ Go?"
13. "Love at First Sight"
14. "Last Chance"
15. "Magic"

== Infinite Disco live album ==
Infinite Disco

Live album by Kylie Minogue
- Released: 8 April 2022
- Recorded: 2020
- Venue: LH3 Studios (London, England)
- Genre: Pop; disco
- Length: 49:33
- Label: Darenote; BMG
- Producer: PhD; Steve Anderson; Richard Stannard; Duck Blackwell; Sky Adams; Jim Eliot; Stuart Price; Nico Stadi; Teemu Brunila; Sunnyroads; Kiris Houston; Julian Gallagher

Kylie Minogue chronology
Disco (2020)	Infinite Disco (2022)	Tension (2023)

Infinite Disco is the ninth live album by Australian singer Kylie Minogue. On 12 November 2021, the "Guest List Edition" of Minogue's fifteenth studio album Disco was released. Included in the deluxe five-disc package was a recording of the Infinite Disco concert on CD, DVD, and Blu-ray. On 7 April 2022, Minogue took to her social media to announce the surprise release of a standalone release of Infinite Disco on digital platforms the following day, with LP formats available for pre-order.

=== Track listing ===
No.	Title	Writer(s)	Producer(s)	Length
1.	"Magic" (Intro)	Kylie Minogue; Teemu Brunila; Daniel Davidsen; Peter Wallevik; Michelle Buzz	PhD	1:33
2.	"Come into My World" (Interlude)	Cathy Dennis; Rob Davis	Steve Anderson	0:21
3.	"I Love It"	Minogue; Richard Stannard; Duck Blackwell	Stannard; Blackwell	3:03
4.	"In Your Eyes"	Minogue; Stannard; Julian Gallagher; Ash Howes	Stannard; Anderson	3:05
5.	"Light Years"	Minogue; Stannard; Gallagher	Stannard; Anderson	2:45
6.	"Supernova"	Minogue; Sky Adams; Maegan Cottone	Adams	3:13
7.	"Light Years" (Reprise)	Minogue; Stannard; Gallagher	Stannard; Anderson	0:33
8.	"I Should Be So Lucky" (Interlude)	Mike Stock; Matt Aitken; Pete Waterman	Anderson	0:25
9.	"Dance Floor Darling"	Minogue; Adams; Cottone; Linslee Campbell	Adams	3:17
10.	"All the Lovers" (with House Gospel Choir)	James Eliot; Jemima Stilwell	Eliot; Stuart Price	3:36
11.	"Say Something" (with House Gospel Choir)	Minogue; Stannard; Howes; Jonathan Green	Adams	4:00
12.	"Real Groove"	Minogue; Brunila; Nico Stadi; Alida Garpestad Peck	Stadi; Brunila	2:54
13.	"Slow" / "Love to Love You Baby"	Minogue; Dan Carey; Emilíana Torrini; Giorgio Moroder; Pete Bellotte; Donna Summer	Sunnyroads	3:13
14.	"Monday Blues"	Minogue; Adams; Cottone; Campbell; Danny Shah	Adams	3:11
15.	"Where Does the DJ Go?"	Minogue; Adams; Shah; Kiris Houston	Adams; Houston	2:54
16.	"Love at First Sight"	Minogue; Stannard; Gallagher; Howes; Martin Harrington	Stannard; Gallagher	4:05
17.	"Last Chance"	Minogue; Adams; Cottone	Adams	2:46
18.	"Magic"	Minogue; Brunila; Wallevik; Davidsen; Buzz	PhD	4:39
Total length:				49:33

=== Charts ===
Chart performance for Infinite Disco
Chart (2022)	Peak position
Australian Albums (ARIA)	27
Australian Independent Label Albums	2
Belgian Albums (Ultratop Wallonia)	22
Scottish Albums (OCC)	11
Spanish Albums (Promusicae)	48
Swiss Albums (Schweizer Hitparade)	72
UK Albums (OCC)	40
UK Independent Albums (OCC)	24
US Current Album Sales (Billboard)	74

=== Release history ===
Release dates and formats for Infinite Disco
Region	Date	Format	Label	Ref.
Various	8 April 2022	Digital download; streaming	Darenote; BMG	
Various	6 May 2022	LP	Darenote; BMG	

== Credits ==
Credits obtained from the viewing of East Coast USA livestream

Directors and producers

- Director: Kate Moross and Rob Sinclair
- Director of photography: Thomas English
- Executive producer: Kylie Minogue, Polly Bhowmik, Tom Colboure and Rob Sinclair
- Executive producer for Driift: Ric Salmon and Charlie Gatsky Sinclair
- Executive producer for BMG: Alistar Nobury, Gemma Reilly-Hammond, and Jamie Nelson
- Producer: Jim Parsons
- Co-producer: Kristen Dickson-McFie

General staff

- Personal assistant: Tully Bloom
- HSE & COVID safety: Julian Bentley and Lukasz Mart
- Catering: Lily Brown, Sherrie Fairman, and Shyrah-Jade Campbell

Costuming

- Costume designer: Alexandre Vauthier
- Costume stylist: Frank Strachan
- Wardrobe: Ray Wooldridge, Philippa Howden, Tom Lawerence, and Alida Herbst
- Assistant stylist: Jessica Johnston
- Hair and makeup: Christian Vermaak and Chang Il-Kim
- Additional hair & makeup: Sandra O'Brien
- Colorist: James Tonkin

Band

- Musical director: Richard Stannard and Steve Anderson
- Backing vocalists: Abbie Osmon and Katie Holmes-Smith
- Choir master: Laura Leon
- House Gospel Choir: Cartell Green-Brown, Laura Davie, Leanna Leid, Lizzie Jennings, Monique Meade, and Renee Alleyne
- Choreographer: Ashley Wallen
- Dance captain: Jenny Griffin
- Dancers: Philip Birchall, Yves Cueni, Shaun Niles, Kamila Zalewska, Alex Chambers, Jake Leigh, Katie Collins, Ben Hulkin, and Elise Pinel

Sound

- Audio mixer: Duck Blackwell
- Sound: Gavin Tempany, Andrew Hamwee, and Jonny Buck

Production

- Production design: Sinclair/Wilkinson
- Production design associate: Luke Rolls
- Production manager: Michael George
- Racks engineer: Harry Watkinson
- Records engineer: David Roberts
- Script supervisor: Emily Aldous
- CT project manager: Jim Liddiard
- Event production: Lauren Sass, Stephen Reeve, Kevin Hopgood, Bree Ishikawa, Stuart Quinnell and Dave Farrell (Pull the Pin Out)

Video

- Video design: Kate Moross, Linus Kraemer, and Dexter George
- Motion design: Santiago Avila, Linus Kraemer, Dexter George, and Stephen McLaughlin
- Video content: Studio Moross
- Video content project manager: Bellen Morrison
- Video programmer: Jack Banks
- Video floor technician: Taras Bunt and Daniel Bovenkamp
- Editing: Rupa Rathod, Hamish Lyons, Sam Thompsett
- Additional editing: Kevin Ramser
- Online editing: Richard Cullen
- Visual effects: Kate Moross, Linus Kraemer, and Chris Kim
- DIT: Alex Hewett

Lighting

- Lighting design: Rob Sinclair and Ali Pike
- Lighting: Benjamin Cash, Andy Porter, Davide Palumbi, Jason Hyne, Jon Shelley-Smith, Michelle Parker and Peter Horne
- Laser design: Seth Griffiths
- Laser technician: Joe Jackson and Josh Hughes

Cameras

- Multicam director: Blue Leach
- Camera operator: Simon Kennedy and Mark Stevenson
- Camera guarantee: Tom Robinson
- JIB operator: Marcus Leon Soon
- JIB assistant: Ben Reason
- Focus puller: Warren Buckingham

Miscellaneous

- Filmed at LH3 Studios, London
- Lighting supplied by NEG Earth Lights (Sam Ridgeway)
- Lasers and SFX by ER Productions (Marc Webber)
- Broadcast equipment and LED screens by Creative Technologies (Graham Miller)
- Grip supplied by Luna Remote Systems
- Cameras supplied by Procam TV
- JIB supplied by Deve Emery
- Film lighting supplied by Pro Light
- Filters supplied by Panavision
- DRIIFT is represented by Ric Salmon, Charlie Gatsky Sinclair, Phil Middleton, Pauline Macocco, Justine Young, Emma Stoker, Claire Mas, and Mich Bradfield
