= Miss a Thing =

2020 song by Kylie Minogue

- Artwork used on Minogue's YouTube channel

Song by Kylie Minogue

from the album Disco
- Released: 6 November 2020
- Recorded: 2019
- Studio: Pulse Music Group (Los Angeles, California); Rabbit Villa (Turku); Infinite Disco (London, England)
- Genre: Disco; dance-pop
- Length: 3:56
- Label: BMG; Darenote
- Songwriters: Ally Ahern; Teemu Brunila; Kylie Minogue; Nico Stadi
- Producers: Brunila; Stadi

Music video
- "Miss a Thing" on YouTube

"Miss a Thing" is a song by Australian singer Kylie Minogue. It appears as the second track on Minogue's fifteenth studio album, Disco (2020). The song was co-written by Minogue, Ally Ahern, and producers Teemu Brunila and Nico Stadi. Musically, it is a disco-pop hybrid that incorporates electric guitars and lush string arrangements while expressing both a classic and modern interpretation of the disco genre. The song's composition was compared to that of various artists, most notably French music duo Daft Punk. Lyrically, it explores themes of love and having fun on the dancefloor. An extended version of the song was included on the remix album Disco: Extended Mixes (2021).

Some music critics praised "Miss a Thing" for its lush production, and experimentation with various sounds and genres, while others thought it was overproduced and unoriginal. A few critics considered it a contender for a single from the parent album. Despite not being released as a single, it appeared on the US Hot Dance/Electronic Songs chart and the UK Independent Singles chart during the release week of Disco. Minogue promoted the song with a music video shot by British filmmaker Sophie Muller, which she uploaded to YouTube.

== Writing and development ==
Minogue began working on new music in 2019, after completing the promotion for her fourteenth studio album, Golden (2018), and subsequent tour. During her tour, she was inspired by a segment influenced by the disco aesthetic and Studio 54, and she realised that her creative path would be "heading straight back to the dance floor" with a disco-themed album. According to Minogue, she received a demo recording of "Miss a Thing" in February 2020. When she first heard the demo, she thought it fit the parent album's disco aesthetic: "There was enough disco in there, but it felt like a fresh interpretation," she said when reviewing the record on Apple Music.

She was scheduled to fly to Los Angeles to continue working on the song with one of the original songwriters, Teemu Brunila. However, due to the COVID-19 pandemic and widespread lockdowns, production ceased. During the lockdown, Minogue worked remotely from her London home, experimenting with different software and engineering tools such as Logic Pro and GarageBand. She expressed her frustrations during the recording process, claiming that she was unable to achieve certain vocal deliveries while singing the song. She eventually finished it while corresponding with Brunila remotely.

== Composition ==
"I had a meltdown one day with him [Teemu Brunila]. I was trying to do this vocal and I was so exhausted, and stressed, I couldn't. I felt like I was failing him and me. I didn't go to the full cry, but I came close. All this, and yet we've never met. I can't wait to give him a hug when we finally can."

— Minogue talking about the development of "Miss a Thing".

Minogue co-wrote "Miss a Thing" with Ally Ahern and producers Brunila and Nico Stadi. The song lasts three minutes and 56 seconds. Musically, it is a disco-pop hybrid that features electric guitars and lush string arrangements. It appears as the second track on Disco; Matthew Barton of Beats Per Minute felt the song's inclusion after album track "Magic" "takes a turn for the dreamier" and wrote, "its Chic-inspired bassline and beat, and a more sophisticated arrangement with disco strings cloaking it like a glossy curtain, exemplifying the 'lost on the dancefloor' mode that most of us have been missing in 2020."

Clash editor Lisa Wright compared the sound to that of French music duo Daft Punk, noting that it "moves the tempo up a notch" and includes "retro-fetishism for good measure". Nick Levine of NME shared similar sentiments, comparing the song and album track "Where Does the DJ Go?" to Daft Punk's work on Random Access Memories (2013). David Smyth of The Evening Standard compared it to Minogue's single "Can't Get You Out of My Head", noting that "she's nostalgic for her own material too". Sal Cinquemani of Slant Magazine compared it to Minogue's previous work on Light Years (2000) and Fever (2001), while Pitchfork writer Katherine St. Asaph thought the melody was similar to Minogue's 1994 single "Confide in Me".

Attitude published a track-by-track review with contributions from Will Stroude, Christian Guiltenane, and Kieran Lacini; Lacini felt the sound was "laid-back disco" and compared it to the works of British singer Jessie Ware, while Lacini compared it to the work of British band Jamiroquai. Lyrically, it explores themes of love and having fun on the dancefloor; Medium wrote about the song's theme and Minogue's performance, saying it "straps listeners in for Minogue's shift on the dance floor, as she cajoles her love interest to enjoy the pleasures of life with her, and urging them to confess their feelings for her".

== Critical reception ==
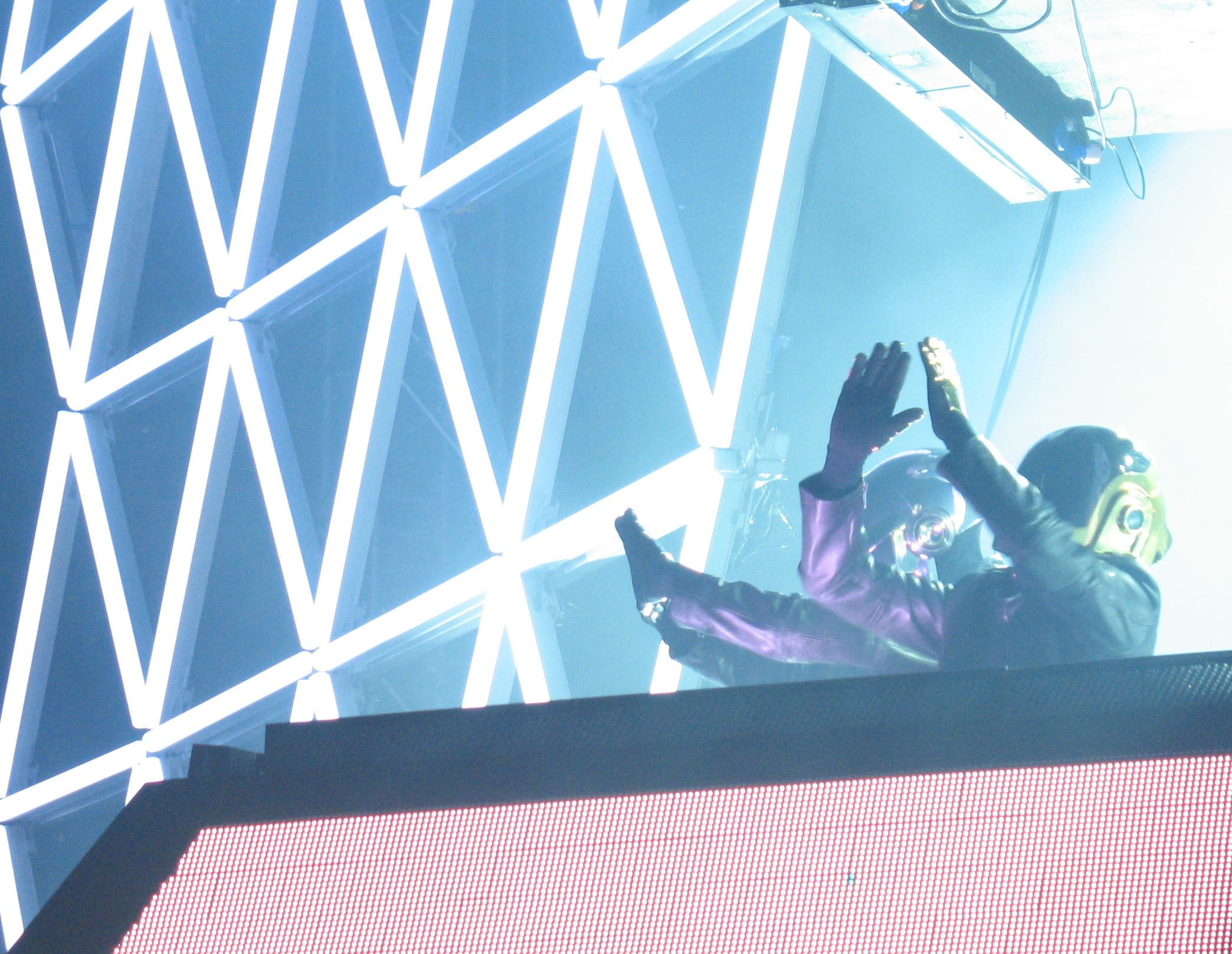
Several critics and publications compared "Miss a Thing" to the work of French music duo Daft Punk (pictured).

Music critics gave "Miss a Thing" positive reviews. Helen Brown of The Independent named it one of the album's best tracks, as did Gary James of Entertainment Focus. AllMusic writer Neil Z. Yeung described it as "an evocative dose of bliss to hustle the night away". Nick Smith of MusicOMH described it as a "breathy disco version of her own behemoth 'Can’t Get You Out Of My Head', so much so that you can interpolate the iconic la la las when it suits". Albumism writer Quentin Harrison called it one of the album's "quintessential pop music subjects", while NME contributor Nick Levine described it as having "enough variety here to keep things interesting". Huffington Post editor Matt Bagwell described it as a "cooler, slinkier, grown-up cousin" to "Magic" and "one of the more straight-up disco songs on the album".

God Is in the TV writer Richard Wiggens described it as "soft and mystic", with a "sexy, nostalgic quality to it", and concluded, "Muffled, soft thuds provide an infectious beat for Kylie to vocally dance all over." CJ Thorpe-Tracey of The Quietus wrote: "The beat [of 'Miss a Thing'] is polished to the shimmering max, yet crucially, it does not boff." Medium described it as a "more intimate banger that still sounds hot, heavy, and poised for the dance-floor", while Grindr staff described it as "the song's carpe diem message is elegantly executed with a classic Kylie couplet: 'Get that body up on the catwalk / Can't sleep through your life like a lapdog.'" Marc Andrews of DNA called it Minogue's "slinkiest and sexiest" song, while Mike Wass of Idolator thought it was "single-worthy".

Other critics had mixed feelings about "Miss a Thing". Michael Cragg of The Guardian thought the song, along with album track "I Love It", were two of the album's weaker tracks, calling it "Strictly Come Dancing schmaltz" that "are saved by a prevailing and unwavering belief in the healing power of pop". According to Jeffrey Davis of PopMatters, the song and album track "Supernova" were overproduced with "manic sounds and manipulated vocals".

== Commercial performance ==
"Miss a Thing" was not released as a single by Disco, but rather with the album's release on 6 November 2020 in digital and physical formats. Nonetheless, it achieved some chart success during the album's release week. In the United States, it spent one week at number 30 on the Hot Dance/Electronic Songs chart and 14 on the Hot Dance/Electronic Digital Songs chart. In the United Kingdom, it spent one week at number 43 on the Independent Singles chart.

== Promotion ==
"Miss a Thing" was included in the repackaging of the parent album, Disco: Guest List Edition (2021). Additionally, an extended version was included on the remix album Disco: Extended Mixes (2021), which was initially available on vinyl and later through digital and streaming services. On 22 July 2022, Minogue released a music video for "Miss a Thing" on her YouTube channel. British filmmaker and longtime collaborator Sophie Muller directed the video, and was shot by Robbie Ryan using vintage Ikegami 79D TV cameras. The result is a "hypnotic montage, with simple mirror VFX enhancing the mood, and the vintage camera adding texture."

== Track listing ==
Album version

1. "Miss a Thing" – 3:56

Extended version

1. "Miss a Thing" – 5:20

== Credits and personnel ==
Credits adapted from the liner notes of Disco.

- Kylie Minogue – songwriter, lead vocals, background vocals, vocal engineer
- Nico Stadi – songwriter, producer, guitar, bass, strings, keyboards, drum programming, mixer
- Teemu Brunila – songwriter, producer, mixer
- Ally Ahern – songwriter
- Dick Beetham – audio master

== Charts ==
Chart performance for "Miss a Thing"
Chart (2020)	Peak position
UK Indie (Official Charts)	43
US Hot Dance/Electronic Songs (Billboard)	30

== Release history ==
Release dates and formats for "Miss a Thing"
Region	Date	Version	Format	Label	Ref.
Various	6 November 2020	Album version	Digital download; streaming	BMG; Darenote	
Various	8 December 2020	Extended mix	Digital download; streaming	BMG; Darenote	
