= I Love It =

I Love It may refer to:

- I Love It (album), by Craig Morgan, 2003
- "I Love It" (Hilltop Hoods song), featuring Sia, 2011
- "I Love It" (Kanye West and Lil Pump song), featuring Adele Givens, 2018
- "I Love It" (Kylie Minogue song), 2020
- "I Love It" (Icona Pop song), featuring Charli XCX, 2012
- "I Love It" (Sneaky Sound System song), 2006

== See also ==
- "I Don't Like It, I Love It", a 2015 song by Flo Rida featuring Robin Thicke and Verdine White
- "I Like It, I Love It", a 1995 song by Tim McGraw
- "Iloveitiloveitiloveit", a 2026 song by Bella Kay
- I, Lovett, a 1989/1993 British television sitcom
- I Luv It (disambiguation)
- Love It (disambiguation)
- I Like It (disambiguation)
