= Disco (Kylie Minogue album) =

Studio album by Kylie Minogue
- Released: 6 November 2020
- Recorded: 2019–2020
- Studios: Sky Adam's home studio (Bedfordshire); Biffco (Brighton); Fluff (London); Infinite Disco (London); Metropolis (London); Phrased Differently (London); Sarm (London); Spark (London); Pulse Music (Los Angeles); Rabbit Villa (Turku)
- Genres: Disco; dance-pop; synth-pop; electropop
- Length: 41:29
- Labels: BMG; Darenote; Liberator Music
- Producers: Sky Adams; Duck Blackwell; Teemu Brunila; Linslee Campbell; Jon Green; Kiris Houston; Troy Miller; Nico Stadi; Biff Stannard; PhD

Kylie Minogue chronology
Golden Live in Concert (2019)	Disco (2020)	Infinite Disco (2022)

Singles from Disco
- 1. "Say Something" Released: 23 July 2020; 2. "Magic" Released: 24 September 2020; 3. "Real Groove" Released: 31 December 2020

Disco is the fifteenth studio album by Australian singer Kylie Minogue. BMG and Minogue's company Darenote released it on 6 November 2020 in both digital and physical formats. After finishing her campaign with her previous album Golden (2018), Minogue was inspired by a Studio 54-esque section on her Golden Tour to create a disco-themed album. Early sessions began in 2019–2020, but were temporarily halted due to the COVID-19 pandemic and widespread lockdowns. As a result, Minogue continued to work on the album remotely from London, using GarageBand and Logic Pro for the first time.

Disco includes a variety of aesthetics from the titular genre, interpreting both traditional and modern concepts. Furthermore, escapism and a sense of hope were used as themes throughout the album, with lyrics discussing unity, love, having fun on the dancefloor, and celebration. The album also incorporates various genres from the 1970s to the 2000s, such as dance, funk, and pop music, which were compared to her previous records and other musical acts. Minogue is credited as a songwriter on all tracks and engineered her vocals on a majority of the record herself.

Music critics praised Disco for its production quality, catchiness, fun nature, and innovative approach to disco music. Since its release, the album has received numerous nominations and awards, as well as inclusion on various end-of-year critics lists. Commercially, the album was a success, reaching the top of the record charts in Australia, Scotland, and the United Kingdom and being certified gold by the British Phonographic Industry (BPI) in the latter region. It also reached the top ten in Austria, Belgium, France, Germany, Ireland, New Zealand, Spain, and Switzerland. Since its release, the album has sold more than 1,300,000 units worldwide.

To promote the album, Disco spawned three singles: "Say Something", "Magic" and "Real Groove". In addition, two promotional singles from the album were released ("I Love It" and "Dance Floor Darling"), while album tracks "Miss a Thing" and "Supernova" achieved some commercial success during the release week of Disco. Minogue made several live appearances and performed songs from the album on television shows. She hosted Infinite Disco, a livestream show which was later published on a live release and DVD. It was followed by Disco: Guest List Edition, a reissue with three new songs, and Disco: Extended Mixes, a remix album featuring extended versions of the standard tracks.

== Background ==
In April 2018, Minogue released her fourteenth studio album, Golden. It was her first record after leaving Parlophone and signing with BMG Rights Management, as well as her first full-length album co-distributed by her company Darenote. Golden represented a departure from traditional dance-pop music, with a focus on country influences. Despite its commercial success, it received lukewarm reviews from music critics, owing in part to Minogue's experimentation with country music. Slant Magazine editor Sal Cinquemani predicted that "Golden further bolsters Minogue's reputation for taking risks—and artfully sets the stage for her inevitable disco comeback."

Minogue promoted the album through her Kylie Presents Golden tour in Europe and North America, followed by her Golden Tour, which included new dates throughout Europe and finished in Australia. Minogue began working on new music while touring with Golden, but she lacked a clear direction or theme. According to her, she was inspired by a Golden Tour segment loosely based on disco culture and Studio 54. As a result, she felt her creative direction was "heading straight back to the dance floor" with a disco-themed album. Following her appearance at the Glastonbury Festival that same year, and while promoting her greatest hits album Step Back in Time: The Definitive Collection (2019), she announced plans to release a "pop-disco" album.

== Production and development ==
"That section [on Golden Tour] was the home stretch, when you're digging deep, the adrenalin's taking over and the finish line's in sight each night [...] I absolutely loved it and, suddenly, I just knew I wanted to spend more time there. After Golden and the greatest hits, I just wanted to be on the dancefloor again."

— Minogue commenting on the concept of Disco.

Development began in London in the autumn of 2019 and continued into 2020; she initially worked with Ash Howes, Jon Green, and long-time collaborator Richard "Biff" Stannard early in the production process. Minogue stated that she was initially concerned about the album's overall concept, but her team reassured her about the sound and process, saying, "We think we've got this disco thing down. We know what lane we should be in." By February 2020, Minogue had worked on two tracks: "I Love It" and "Where Does the DJ Go?". That same month, Minogue received a demo of the song "Miss a Thing" and thought it fit the parent album's disco aesthetic: "There was enough disco in there, but it felt like a fresh interpretation."

Collaborations include sessions with German producer Mousse T, Italian DJ Alex Gaudino, and French producer Mirwais Ahmadzaï. Minogue took a break from recording to present the last show of the Summer 2019 in São Paulo in early March. Following that, she was scheduled to fly to Los Angeles to work on "Miss a Thing" with one of the songwriters, Teemu Brunila. However, around that time, the COVID-19 pandemic impacted the majority of the world, prompting widespread lockdown measures. As a result, Minogue recorded and produced the song in her home in London. She described the effects as "eerie" in the early weeks as she tried to figure out how to continue working on her music. Given the impossibilities of the pandemic, she set up a private studio in her own home and started working alone on producing the album using the software GarageBand. Later, she began recording her vocals with Logic Pro, which "took some time getting used to". Throughout the production process, Minogue was unsure of the album's theme. She said, "I did wonder at a certain point if this was still right, [...] Is it viable or is this just unpalatable?" Minogue's A&R, Jamie Nelson, reassured her that it was the right direction. He stated, "Kylie's known to some extent for making disco records, but she's not made any real dance music in some years now. And, bearing in mind what's gone on in the world over the last six months, it feels absolutely on message in terms of what people need..."

Despite previous work on the record before the lockdown, approximately 90% of the tracks on Disco were recorded and produced in her private studio. The first recording sessions were held in various studios throughout England, as well as in Finland (Rabbit Villa Studios) and Los Angeles (Pulse Music Studios). Minogue co-wrote all of the songs on the album, and she received additional vocal engineering credits on almost every track except "Magic", which was done by Alex Robinson. Minogue also used synthesizers on the song "Supernova".

== Themes and composition ==
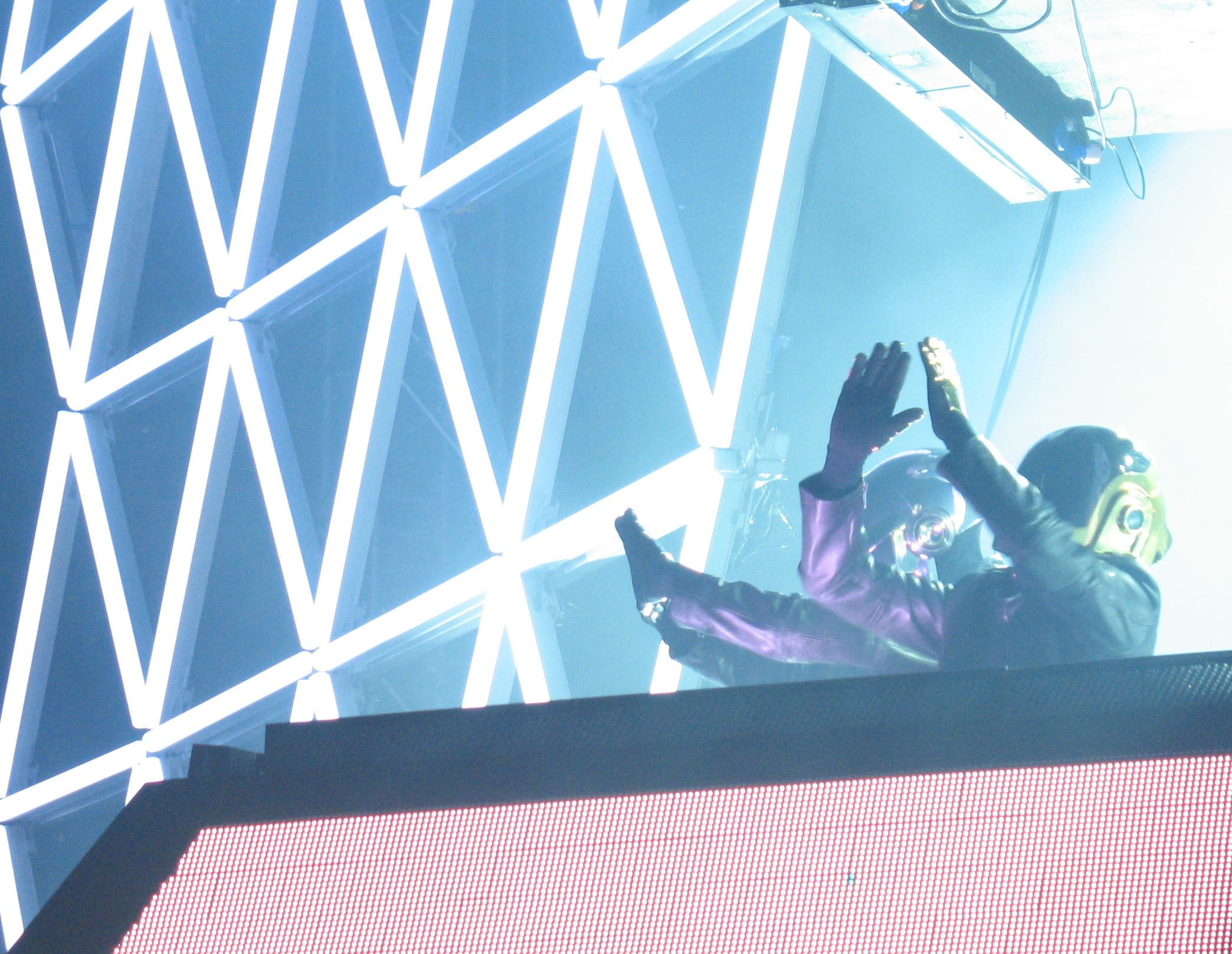
Several critics compared the work from Disco to various music acts, notably French music duo Daft Punk (pictured).

Disco is a reference to the genre of the same name, and encompasses both traditional and modern interpretations of the genre. In an Apple Music review, Minogue reflected on disco music's prominence in the 1970s and during the 2020 lockdown measures, saying, "At its inception, disco was a way of allowing people to dance through their struggle and pain". She also reflected on the genre's power and sentiments during difficult times like the lockdown, saying, "some of the best disco songs are mission statements of strength. Even though I started recording before the dramas of 2020, there is a correlation."

Escapism is a recurring theme throughout the album, providing a source of hope during the lockdown. According to Helen Brown of The Independent, felt its disco sound was influenced by "the original American disco scene, born in the underground clubs of New York City in the years after her own birth in 1968", and disco was a form of escapism for oppressed underground people. Lyrically, the album delves into themes such as love and intimacy, fun, unity, and celebration. Regarding its songwriting, The Guardian editor Michael Cragg wrote, "Kylie is listed as a co-writer on every track here, and while that album touched on some of her personal upheavals, Disco's lyrics mainly revolve around the push and pull of love and its myriad forms."

Disco also incorporates sounds and genres that are not typical of the disco genre. Neil Z. Yeung of AllMusic called it a "welcome return to the club-friendly dance-pop that defined Australian diva Kylie Minogue's early 21st century rebirth", comparing it to the works of Gloria Gaynor, Chic, and Donna Summer. Robbin Murray of Clash agreed, describing it as "the sound of Kylie Minogue re-connecting with her roots". Lisa Wright, writing for DIY, stated that while Disco is influenced by disco music from the 1970s and 1980s, she believes Minogue "still manages to savvily read the room of the current popscape". The Arts Desk editor Lisa-Marie Ferla described the album as "12 tracks of giddy, gleaming, disco-pop escapism".

== Songs and content ==
"Real Groove"
A disco-pop song set to a funk bass and 1980s-styled strings, "Real Groove" sees Minogue singing about love being gained, lost and found, using Europop vocal melodies and Auto-Tune.

Disco begins with "Magic", a disco track influenced by 1970s pop music and featuring instrumentation of horns, "funky" strings, "celebratory" handclaps, and staccato keys. Minogue described it as the "hors d'oeuvre" to the record, describing it as "classic, grown-up, and polished". "Miss a Thing" is a disco-dance hybrid with lush string arrangements that Minogue felt complemented the album's sonic flow. The "retro-futuristic" sound has been compared to Minogue's albums Light Years (2000) and Fever (2001), as well as the work of French music duo Daft Punk. "Real Groove" is a 1980s disco track with house and R&B influences, as well as additional keyboard instrumentation and Auto-Tune effects. It has been compared to British singer Dua Lipa's work on Future Nostalgia (2020).

"Monday Blues" shifts away from the album's disco sound and energy, focusing on a fast-paced "summery pop" sound with partying ambient background noises and heavy guitar strumming. Minogue admitted that she nearly gave up on the track because the verses and chorus were constantly changing. "Supernova" is an "energetic" disco song influenced by "celestial imagery" and intergalactic themes; it was compared to the work of German band Boney M, American drag queen RuPaul, and Daft Punk. "Say Something" is a slower disco-inspired number with elements of dance-pop, electro-pop, and synth-pop, featuring "thick" synths, drum crashes, a funk guitar, and a choir section provided by the House Gospel Choir. Its themes of love and unity are exemplified in the lyrics, "Love is love / It never ends / Can we all be as one again?".

According to Minogue, "Last Chance" was inspired by Swedish group ABBA and British-Australian group the Bee Gees. It is a pop-infused track that also pays musical homage to Donna Summer's song "Last Dance" and ABBA's track "Voulez-Vous". "I Love It" is a pop song with string arrangements that had a different structure before its completion. The line "So come on, let the music play / we're gonna take it all the way" was inspired by the work of American singer Lionel Richie. "Where Does the DJ Go?" is a "frantic" and "quick"-paced track that pays homage to Gloria Gaynor's song "I Will Survive" and has been compared to Daft Punk.

"Dance Floor Darling" is inspired by 1980s pop music and begins with a mid-tempo beat featuring finger snapping, vocoders, and synths; it then transitions into a spoken word section before ending with an uptempo beat near the end of the song. According to Minogue, the song has "no depth" but treats its energy as a "hug". "Unstoppable" is compared to a "refreshing sorbet, palate cleanser" when contrasting it with "Magic" as an album opener, and the rest of the album with its uptempo energy. The standard album closer "Celebrate You" is a piano-led track that focuses primarily on Minogue's vocal performances and songwriting. The song is written in a third-person narrative, with Minogue mentioning the name Mary, which was inspired by "mumble-singing melodies". She described it as a "wind down" for the album, with lyrics about "heart and connection".

== Release and formats ==
Disco was released on 6 November 2020. Minogue's fifteenth studio album, and her second with BMG, is co-distributed by her company Darenote. The standard album contains 12 tracks totalling more than 41 minutes in length, while the deluxe edition includes four additional songs: "Til' You Love Somebody", "Fine Wine", "Hey Lonely", and "Spotlight". Disco was available in a variety of physical formats through her website and retail stores; early bundles included a signed autograph from Minogue. The standard edition was released in both digisleeve and casebound formats, while the deluxe edition was only available in the latter.

Six vinyl variations were also made available: a standard black vinyl, a clear vinyl, a turquoise-colored vinyl, a blue-colored vinyl, a blue-marble vinyl, and a limited edition glow-in-the-dark vinyl. Two white test pressing vinyls were created for the standard and deluxe editions. Five cassette tapes were also released, each with a different cover art and colour: turquoise, blue, clear, white, and an additional blue colour, with two cassettes containing deluxe content. The standard and deluxe versions were available on digital and streaming platforms.

Simon Emmett shot the artwork and promotional photographs for Disco. Minogue is shown on the cover with curly blonde hair, a blue sequin dress, and a lens flare in the centre of her hands, as well as her name and album title in the top corners. Moross Studios created the designs, which also included scenes and design work for Minogue's Infinite Disco tour.

=== Guest List Edition and Disco: Extended Mixes ===
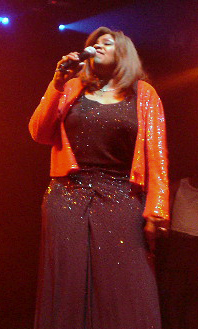
American singer Gloria Gaynor (pictured) participated on the track "Can't Stop Writing Songs About You" as a featuring artist.

Minogue revealed that she planned to re-release Disco in 2021. In October, she announced the repackaging of Disco, titled Disco: Guest List Edition. The re-issue featured three additional singles: "A Second to Midnight" with Years & Years, "Kiss of Life" with Jessie Ware, and "Can't Stop Writing Songs About You" with Gloria Gaynor. The latter song was proposed to Minogue as a standalone recording during the album's initial session, but it was removed from the final track list; it was the only song on the album to not be written by Minogue. Gaynor was approached to record on the song after she had complimented Minogue on social media for her work during the campaign for Disco.

BMG and Darenote released the Guest List Edition on 12 November 2021. The packaging features previously unseen images from the Disco album, as well as a new album cover. Minogue released the re-issue in a variety of formats on her website, as she did with the original Disco album. The double disc standard edition includes all twelve original tracks as well as bonus tracks, while the second disc includes three new songs and seven remixes of various album tracks. A limited-edition media book included five discs, a 20-page booklet with photographs, song lyrics, and notes for the new tracks, as well as live audio and video from Minogue's Infinite Disco live stream. The standard and deluxe editions were released in digital format, while the double gatefold vinyl included all of the songs on the tracklist.

To accompany the Guest List Edition, a remix album called Disco: Extended Mixes was released, featuring extended versions of each original track. Her webstore featured a double gatefold vinyl with a holographic design of the original Disco artwork. It was also included in an exclusive limited edition box set, which came in a blue vinyl package with the vinyl version of the Guest List Edition and an empty vinyl cover. The Extended Mixes were later released on digital and streaming platforms on 10 December.

== Singles and promotional releases ==
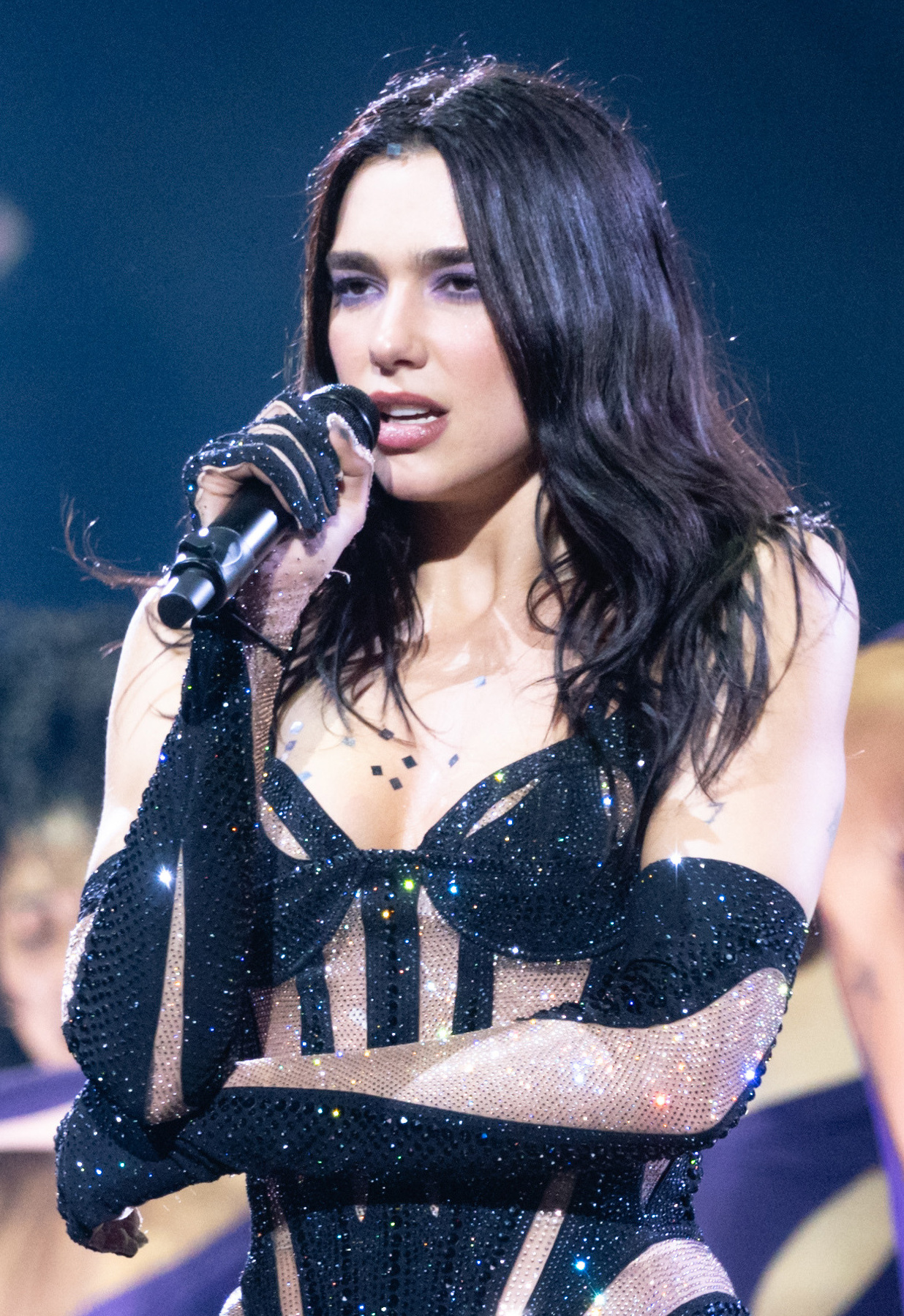
British musician Dua Lipa (pictured) appeared on Kylie Minogue's remixed version of her single "Real Groove".

BMG and Darenote released "Say Something" as the lead single from the album on 23 July 2020. It was released in a variety of digital formats, as well as on vinyl via Minogue's webstore. Critics praised the song, with many citing it as one of Minogue's best. It performed moderately on record charts, reaching number 56 on the UK Singles Chart and number three on the Dance/Electronic Digital Songs chart in the United States. In Australia, it did not make the ARIA Charts but did reach number five on Billboard's Australia Digital Songs chart. Sophie Muller directed a music video at the Black Island Studios in London, England, while adhering to social distancing measures related to the COVID-19 pandemic. It shows the singer riding a golden horse sculpture through space, shooting lasers from her hands, and flying a hovercraft.

"Magic" was released as the album's second single on September 24. It was released in a variety of digital formats, as well as on vinyl via Minogue's webstore. Music critics gave it favourable reviews, particularly for its catchiness and production quality. Commercially, it outperformed its predecessor, reaching number 20 on the ARIA Artists Singles chart in Australia, 53 on the UK Singles Chart, and 18 on the Hot Dance/Electronic Songs chart in the United States. The music video for "Magic" was also directed by Muller and shot at Fabric, a nightclub in Farringdon, London.

"Real Groove" was released as the album's third and final single on 31 December 2020. It was released in a variety of digital formats, as well as on vinyl via Minogue's webstore. Critics praised the song's production quality and overall sound. Commercially, it underperformed, reaching number 95 on the UK Singles Chart and number 15 on the Hot Dance/Electronic Songs chart, with the latter peaking at number 100 on the year-end chart. Minogue's live performance video from her Infinite Disco show was uploaded to her YouTube channel. Furthermore, the "Studio 2054 Remix" featuring Dua Lipa was released on December 31 and was repackaged on the Disco: Guest List Edition of the parent album. The remix featured updated production, handled by Lipa's musical director William Bowerman, as well as an extended instrumental section in the middle of the song.

Two promotional singles were released: "I Love It" and "Dance Floor Darling". The former was released on digital platforms on 23 October 2020, and featured the tracks "Magic" and "Say Something" on the tracklist. "I Love It" peaked at number 25 on the UK Singles Download chart and number 38 on the Hot Dance/Electronic Songs chart. It was also used as a lip-sync song on the American reality television show RuPaul's Drag Race, appearing on the third episode of season 14. "Dance Floor Darling" was released as an airplay single and premiered on BBC Radio 2's B-List, which Minogue acknowledged on Twitter. She promoted the track by creating a TikTok filter and posting it on social media.

The album tracks "Miss a Thing" and "Supernova" were not released as singles, but performed well during Disco's first week of release. "Miss a Thing" reached number 43 on the UK Independent Singles chart and 30 on the Hot Dance/Electronic Songs chart. Muller directed a music video for Minogue on her YouTube channel, which featured her singing the song while wearing a diamond-like catsuit. "Supernova" reached number 48 on the Hot Dance/Electronic Songs chart and was promoted by being used as a lip-sync song twice on RuPaul's Drag Race: once in season one of RuPaul's Drag Race: UK vs. the World and again in season seven of RuPaul's Drag Race All Stars.

=== Live performances and appearances ===
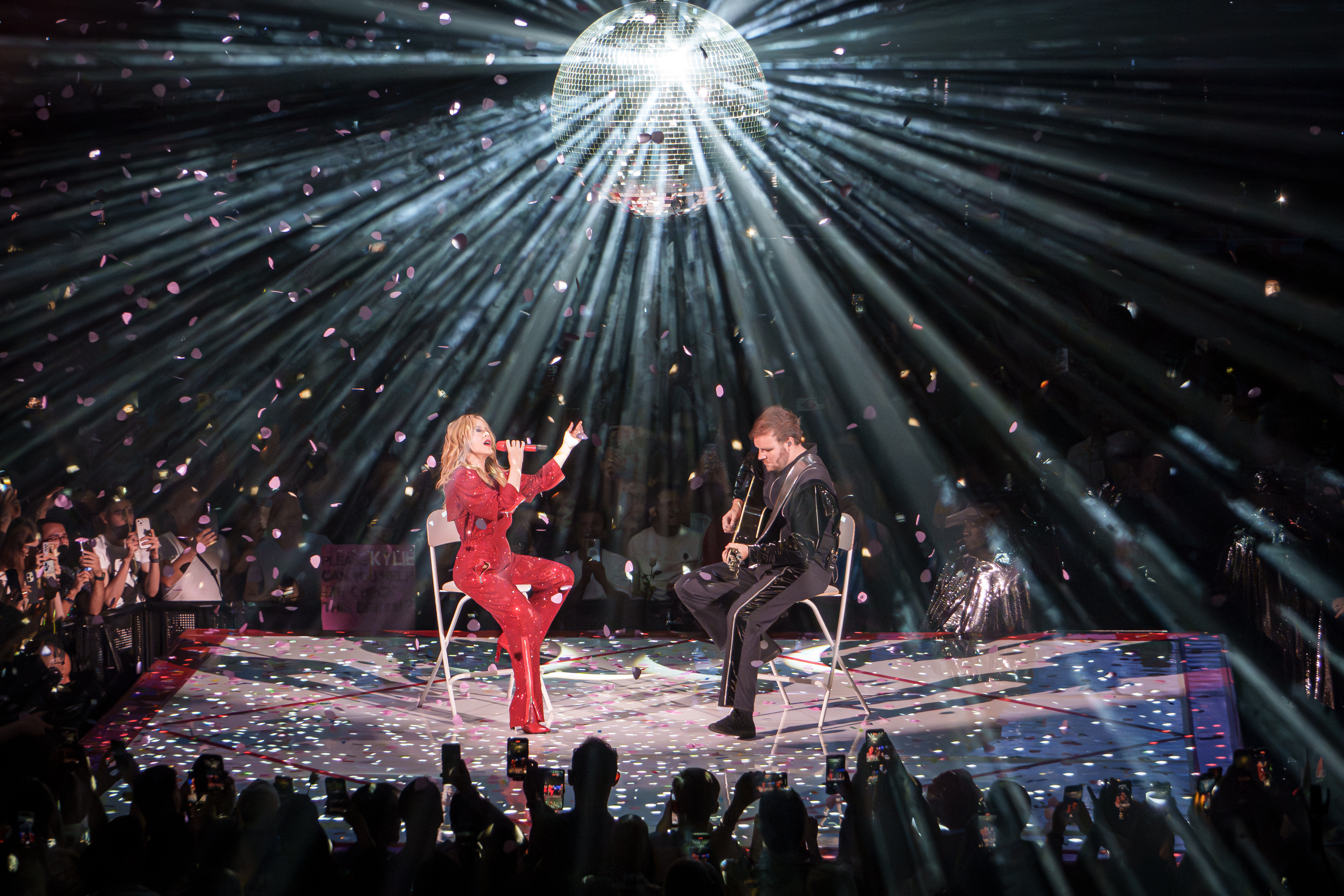
Minogue performing "Say Something" on the 2025's Tension Tour

On 9 August 2020, Minogue made a promotional appearance on The Sound. On 16 September, she performed "Say Something" remotely on The Tonight Show Starring Jimmy Fallon. On 16 October, she was interviewed on UOL, then on Papel Pop the next day. On 29 October, Minogue was interviewed on 7.30. On 1 November, the "Say Something" performance from the then-upcoming concert special 'Infinite Disco' was aired on The Sound. On 2 November, she was interviewed by Zane Lowe on Apple Music 1. To mark the release of the album, Minogue appeared on Sunrise, The Zoe Ball Breakfast Show, Good Morning America and The Graham Norton Show to discuss the album and perform songs on 6 November. She livestreamed a special concert, 'Infinite Disco', featuring songs from the album as well as previous songs from her discography, the latter reworked by Minogue's longtime collaborators Richard Stannard and Steve Anderson. The performance took place on 7 November 2020 and was co-directed by Rob Sinclair and Kate Moross, with the numbers choreographed by Ashley Wallen. A special also aired on Rage that same day.

On 10 November she gave an interview to Magic Radio's Breakfast Show, Reuters and made an appearance on The One Show. On 11 November, Minogue was interviewed on The Morning Show and ET Canada, and performed "Magic" on The Late Show with Stephen Colbert. The next day, she appeared on BBC Breakfast and This Morning. She was interviewed on Sunday Brunch on 15 November and on Lorraine on 17 November. On 19 November she appeared on El Hormiguero and on Skavlan the next day. On 27 November Minogue performed "Real Groove" and "Electricity" with Dua Lipa on her livestream concert Studio 2054. On 1 December, she was interviewed on Quotidien. On 5 December Minogue was interviewed on Graham Norton's Saturday Morning Show on BBC Radio 2 and performed "Real Groove" on The Jonathan Ross Show. She gave an interview to Les Enfants de la télé on 13 December. On 25 December, Minogue appeared on Lorraine and smoothfm. She gave an interview to Today on 29 December.

On 31 December, she livestreamed 'Infinite Disco' again and performed "Magic" on New Year's Eve Live and NBC's New Year's Eve. The latter appearance was a re-airing of the 'Infinite Disco' performance. Several months later on 4 June 2021, the 'Infinite Disco' performance of "Dance Floor Darling" was re-aired as part of iHeartRadio and P&G's 'Can't Cancel Pride' livestream event. On 25 September, "Dance Floor Darling" and "Can't Get You Out of My Head" were performed as part of Global Citizen Live. On 8 October, Minogue and Olly Alexander performed "A Second to Midnight" on The One Show. On 6 November, Minogue gave an interview to Later... with Jools Holland. On 13 November, Minogue and Ware performed "Kiss of Life" together for the first time on The Jonathan Ross Show.

== Critical reception ==
Professional ratings
Aggregate scores
Source	Rating
AnyDecentMusic?	7.2/10
Metacritic	72/100
Review scores
Source	Rating
AllMusic	4.5/5 stars
Clash	8/10
DIY	3.5/5 stars
The Guardian	4/5 stars
The Independent	4/5 stars
NME	4/5 stars
Pitchfork	5.6/10
Rolling Stone	3.5/5 stars
Slant Magazine	3.5/5 stars
The Times	4/5 stars

Disco received positive reviews from most music critics. At Metacritic, which assigns a normalised rating out of 100 to reviews from mainstream critics, the album has an average score of 72 based on 16 reviews, indicating "generally favourable reviews". Additionally, AnyDecentMusic? assigned a normalised rating of 8.1 out of 10, based on 22 reviews from music critics.

AllMusic editor Neil Z. Yeung felt the album hit the "same highs" as her previous albums throughout the 2000s, describing it as a "glittery, feel-good set is nothing short of euphoric, a dozen near-perfect gems that pay respect to the album's namesake era while updating the production with thrilling results." Guido Farrell, The Music editor, referenced the themes from "I Love It" and wrote, "Minogue delivers a simple message of hope on an album that provides non-stop dancefloor kicks." Michael Cragg of The Guardian described the album as "highly saturated in Kylie's supernatural high camp and total sincerity". Albumism writer Quentin Harrison praised the record's sound and delivery, writing, "Disco is the product of a woman keenly aware of her strengths, but not constrained by them", while Clash editor Robin Murray felt it was “her most unashamedly fun record in almost a decade".

NME writer Nick Levine wrote that Disco "shimmers with a warm glittery glow that's just irresistible", while Helen Brown of The Independent wrote that Minogue was on the album to "help us dance through this silliness, straddling Seventies-era dance music and pop fromage". David Smyth of the Evening Standard praised it as a welcome return for the singer, citing "Say Something" as one of her "best-ever singles". Regarding the album's sound, Mick Jacobs of Spectrum Culture wrote, "Disco adds to each one's pop culture standing, the former as a foundational pillar of today's music and the latter as a prolific and still wonderfully entertaining pop act for nearly 30 years."

DIY editor Lisa Wright thought the material on Disco had "brightness, positivity, and joy that the singer's been preaching for 40 years now". Although criticised for not being "the most progressive or groundbreaking album of the year, it's certainly up there as one of the most charming". Jeffrey Davis of PopMatters described it as a "shimmery, ethereal getaway from any which reality you choose, the album gets you dancing and forgetting, therefore achieving its purpose." Sal Cinquemani of Slant Magazine compared it neutrally to Minogue's albums Light Years and Fever, writing, "For better or worse, though, Disco doesn't attempt to adapt the classic titular sound in a contemporary context like those albums did, instead content to bask in unapologetic homage." According to Richard Wiggens of God Is in the TV, Disco "provides a fresh, energetic listen that proves she is still very much part of the pop conversation."

Mathew Marson, a Beats Per Minute contributor, described the overall effort as "fine", writing, “Repeated listens, indeed, prove it to be a perfectly serviceable, enjoyable offering." The Irish Times' Louise Brunton saw a "distinct lack of edge on Disco, which is a wasted opportunity for someone who usually lives there." Despite praising the album's energy and production quality, CJ Thorpe-Tracey of The Quietus criticised Minogue's lack of storytelling and iconoclasm, concluding, "Why does this record not realise how important Kylie is?" Pitchfork writer Katherine St. Asaph gave a mixed review, writing, "The album, with a couple exceptions, has two modes: overly tasteful cruise-ship programming, and gauche rehashes. Kylie front-loads the weakest material—maybe passable in a set, but fatal in an album, where there's no club to leave."

=== Accolades and nominations ===
Disco has received numerous nominations and awards since its release. It was nominated for Best Adult Contemporary Album at the 2021 ARIA Music Awards, her first nomination since 2010's Aphrodite, as well as Best Artist, her first nomination in that category. Crowded House's album Dreamers Are Waiting defeated her in the former, while The Kid Laroi and Justin Bieber's work in "Stay" won in the latter. Music Week awarded Disco the Digital Marketing Masters award, while Minogue and her label BMG were nominated for Artist Marketing Campaign and Murray Chalmers PR (MCPR) for Best PR Campaign for the Album, respectively.

Disco was also nominated for Top Dance/Electronic Album at the 2021 Billboard Music Awards, marking her first nomination through the association. She lost to Lady Gaga's Chromatica. Gaffa, a Nordic magazine, shortlisted the album and Minogue for Best International Solo Act and Best International Album, respectively. Additionally, Disco was submitted and shortlisted for Best Pop Vocal Album at the 64th Annual Grammy Awards, but did not receive a nomination.

=== Year-end lists ===
Critics' rankings for Disco
Publication	Accolade	Rank	Ref.
AllMusic	Best of 2020	—N/a	
Billboard	The 10 Best Dance Albums of 2020	9	
British GQ	Best Albums of 2020	6	
The Daily Telegraph	The Best Albums of 2020	5	
Gaffa	The 20 Best Foreign Albums of 2020	18	
The Guardian	The 50 Best Albums of 2020	42	
Houston Chronicle	Best Albums of 2020	4	
musicOMH	musicOMH's Top 50 Albums of 2020	49	
NME	The 25 Best Australian Albums of 2020	18	
The Quietus	Quietus Albums of the Year 2020	36	
Slant Magazine	The 50 Best Albums of 2020	46	
Variety	The Best Albums of 2020	7	

== Commercial performance ==
On 21 August 2020, Alistair Norbury, the head of BMG, spoke with Music Week about the Disco marketing campaign. Minogue and BMG promoted Disco through a comprehensive marketing campaign before and during the album's release. According to Norbury, Disco outperformed her previous studio album Golden at the same stage of its album campaign. This was based on key metrics like streaming, Amazon pre-orders, direct-to-consumer pre-orders, and video views.

In the United Kingdom, Disco debuted at number one on the UK Albums Chart, selling 5,000 more copies than its closest competitor, Confetti by Little Mix, in what several outlets described as a heated chart battle. The album surpassed Lady Gaga's Chromatica as the biggest first-week release of 2020, selling 54,905 copies. Power Up by Australian band AC/DC quickly surpassed this, selling 62,000 units in its first week.

Disco became Minogue's eighth number one album in the UK, breaking the record for the first female artist to have a number one album in five consecutive decades, following Kylie (1988), Enjoy Yourself (1989), Greatest Hits (1992), Fever (2001), Aphrodite (2010), Golden (2018), and Step Back In Time: The Definitive Collection (2019). The album was certified silver by the British Phonographic Industry (BPI) less than a month after its release, and it was later upgraded to Gold on 18 December 2020, after shipping over 100,000 units. The Official Charts Company reported that the album had sold 179,892 copies as of September 2023.

Disco debuted at number one on the ARIA Albums Chart in Australia, becoming her seventh chart-topping album. Following the release of Guest List Edition, it re-entered the charts at number seven alongside the original. In New Zealand, the album debuted at number nine on the national chart for one week, marking Minogue's first top-ten appearance since Fever in 2001. In France, the album debuted at number eight, her best chart position since Aphrodite peaked at number three. It re-entered at number 45 after the re-release of Guest List Edition for one week.

In the United States, Disco peaked at number 26 on the Billboard 200, her third highest-charting album at the time after Fever in 2002 and Aphrodite in 2010, and was eventually surpassed by Minogue's record Tension in 2023. It also debuted at number two on the Top Albums Sales chart and the top spot on the Dance/Electronic Albums chart, marking her first number-one. The album opened with 19,000 Album-equivalent units, with 15,000 of those being pure sales. As of November 2021, Disco had sold 35,000 copies in the United States. By September 2023, BMG reported that the album had sold around 700,000 copies worldwide.

== Track listing ==
Disco standard edition
No.	Title	Writer(s)	Producer(s)	Length
1.	"Magic"	Kylie Minogue; Teemu Brunila; Peter Wallevik; Daniel Heløy Davidsen; Michelle Buzz	PhD	4:10
2.	"Miss a Thing"	Minogue; Brunila; Nico Stadi; Ally Ahern	Brunila; Stadi	3:56
3.	"Real Groove"	Minogue; Brunila; Stadi; Alida Gaprestad	Brunila; Stadi	3:15
4.	"Monday Blues"	Minogue; Sky Adams; Maegan Cottone; Danny Shah; Linslee Campbell	Adams	3:09
5.	"Supernova"	Minogue; Adams; Cottone	Adams	3:17
6.	"Say Something"	Minogue; Richard "Biff" Stannard; Jon Green; Ash Howes	Green; Stannard; Duck Blackwell^{[a]}; Minogue^{[b]}	3:32
7.	"Last Chance"	Minogue; Adams; Cottone	Adams	3:03
8.	"I Love It"	Minogue; Stannard; Blackwell	Stannard; Blackwell; Minogue^{[b]}	3:50
9.	"Where Does the DJ Go?"	Minogue; Adams; Shah; Kiris Houston	Adams; Houston	3:01
10.	"Dance Floor Darling"	Minogue; Adams; Cottone; Campbell	Adams	3:12
11.	"Unstoppable"	Minogue; Fiona Bevan; Troy Miller	Miller	3:34
12.	"Celebrate You"	Minogue; Adams; Shah; Cottone	Adams	3:41
Total length:				41:29

Disco deluxe edition bonus tracks
No.	Title	Writer(s)	Producer(s)	Length
13.	"Till You Love Somebody"	Minogue; Adams; Brunila; Campbell	Adams; Campbell	3:02
14.	"Fine Wine"	Minogue; Adams; Cottone	Adams	2:44
15.	"Hey Lonely"	Minogue; Adams; Cottone	Adams	3:28
16.	"Spotlight"	Minogue; Adams; Shah; Houston	Adams; Houston	2:44
Total length:				53:25

Disco Japanese release bonus tracks
No.	Title	Writer(s)	Producer(s)	Length
17.	"Say Something" (F9 remix)	Minogue; Green; Howes; Stannard	Green; Stannard; Blackwell^{[a]}; F9^{[c]}	3:38
18.	"Say Something" (Syn Cole remix)	Minogue; Green; Howes; Stannard	Green; Stannard; Blackwell^{[a]}; Syn Cole^{[c]}	3:00
Total length:				60:26

Disco digital super deluxe edition bonus tracks
No.	Title	Writer(s)	Producer(s)	Length
17.	"Say Something" (Basement Jaxx remix)	Minogue; Green; Howes; Stannard	Green; Stannard; Blackwell^{[a]}; Basement Jaxx^{[c]}	5:30
18.	"Say Something" (Syn Cole remix)	Minogue; Green; Howes; Stannard	Green; Stannard; Blackwell^{[a]}; Syn Cole^{[c]}	3:00
19.	"Magic" (Purple Disco Machine remix)	Minogue; Brunila; Davidsen; Wallevik; Buzz	PhD; Purple Disco Machine ^{[c]}	3:36
20.	"Magic" (Nick Reach Up remix)	Minogue; Brunila; Davidsen; Wallevik; Buzz	PhD; Nick Reach Up ^{[c]}	3:11
Total length:				68:42

Disco: Guest List Edition Disc 2
No.	Title	Writer(s)	Producer(s)	Length
17.	"A Second to Midnight" (with Years & Years)	Minogue; Stannard; Blackwell; Olly Alexander; Martin Sjølie	Stannard; Blackwell	3:27
18.	"Kiss of Life" (with Jessie Ware)	Minogue; Ware; James Ford; Danny Parker; Shungudzo	Ford	3:13
19.	"Can't Stop Writing Songs About You" (with Gloria Gaynor)	Wallevik; Davidsen; Iain James; Sinéad Harnett	PhD	3:04
20.	"Real Groove" (Studio 2054 remix; with Dua Lipa)	Minogue; Brunila; Stadi; Gaprestad	Brunila; Stadi; William Bowerman	4:22
21.	"Say Something" (Basement Jaxx remix)	Minogue; Green; Howes; Stannard	Green; Stannard; Blackwell^{[a]}; Basement Jaxx^{[c]}	5:22
22.	"Say Something" (F9 Club Mix)	Minogue; Green; Howes; Stannard	Green; Stannard; Blackwell^{[a]}	6:34
23.	"Say Something" (Syn Cole Extended remix)	Minogue; Green; Howes; Stannard	Green; Stannard; Blackwell^{[a]}; Syn Cole^{[c]}	4:04
24.	"Magic" (Purple Disco Machine Extended remix)	Minogue; Brunila; Davidsen; Wallevik; Buzz	PhD; Purple Disco Machine ^{[c]}	5:07
25.	"Real Groove" (Studio 2054 Initial Talk remix; with Dua Lipa)	Minogue; Brunila; Stadi; Gaprestad	Initial Talk^{[c]}	3:43
26.	"Dance Floor Darling" (Linslee's Electric Slide remix)	Minogue; Adams; Cottone; Campbell		3:55

Disco: Guest List Edition Disc 3 (Live from The Infinite Disco Livestream)
No.	Title	Length
1.	"Magic" (Intro)	1:33
2.	"Come into My World" (Interlude)	0:21
3.	"I Love It"	3:03
4.	"In Your Eyes"	3:05
5.	"Light Years"	2:45
6.	"Supernova"	3:13
7.	"Light Years" (Reprise)	0:33
8.	"I Should Be So Lucky" (Interlude)	0:25
9.	"Dance Floor Darling"	3:17
10.	"All the Lovers" (with House Gospel Choir)	3:36
11.	"Say Something" (with House Gospel Choir)	4:00
12.	"Real Groove"	2:54
13.	"Slow" / "Love to Love You Baby"	3:13
14.	"Monday Blues"	3:11
15.	"Where Does the DJ Go?"	2:54
16.	"Love at First Sight"	4:05
17.	"Last Chance"	2:46
18.	"Magic"	4:39
Total length:		49:33

Disco: Extended Mixes
No.	Title	Length
1.	"Magic" (Extended Mix)	5:32
2.	"Miss a Thing" (Extended Mix)	5:20
3.	"Real Groove" (Extended Mix)	4:23
4.	"Monday Blues" (Extended Mix)	5:11
5.	"Supernova" (Extended Mix)	4:56
6.	"Say Something" (Extended Mix)	5:22
7.	"Last Chance" (Extended Mix)	4:42
8.	"I Love It" (Extended Mix)	5:02
9.	"Where Does the DJ Go?" (Extended Mix)	4:14
10.	"Dance Floor Darling" (Extended Mix)	4:32
11.	"Unstoppable" (Extended Mix)	4:54
12.	"Celebrate You" (Extended Mix)	5:13
Total length:		59:21

=== Notes ===
- ^{^a} signifies an additional producer.
- ^{^b} signifies a vocal producer.
- ^{^c} signifies a remixer.
- "Magic" (Purple Disco Machine Extended remix) is omitted from the Guest List Edition digital album available on Minogue's webstore.
- The standard two disc release of the Guest List Edition places the four Disco deluxe edition tracks at the beginning of disc two, instead of at the end of disc one.

== Personnel ==
Adapted from liner notes.

=== Musicians ===
- Kylie Minogue – lead vocals (all tracks), backing vocals (tracks 1, 6, 11), synthesizer (track 5)
- Felicity Adams – backing vocals (tracks 4, 9, 16)
- Sky Adams – backing vocals (tracks 4–5, 9, 12, 16), guitar (tracks 4–5, 7, 9–10, 12, 14–15), synthesizer (tracks 4–5, 7, 9–10, 12–16), drums (tracks 4–5, 7, 9–10, 12–13, 16), drum programming (tracks 4, 7, 10, 12), programming (tracks 4–5, 7, 9–10, 12, 15), keyboards (tracks 13–15), bass (track 15)
- Adetoun Anibi – backing vocals (track 6)
- Fiona Bevan – backing vocals (track 11)
- Duck Blackwell – keyboards (track 6, 8), bass (track 8), drums (track 8), percussion (track 8), programming (track 8)
- Teemu Brunila – guitar (tracks 2–3), drum programming (tracks 2–3), keyboards (track 13)
- Cherokee Campbell – synthesizer (track 5)
- Linslee Campbell – bass (tracks 4, 7, 12–15), guitar (track 13)
- Maegan Cottone – backing vocals (tracks 4, 7, 10, 12, 14–15)
- Daniel Davidsen – guitar (track 1), drum programming (track 1)
- Jon Green – backing vocals (track 6), keyboards (track 6)
- Kiris Houston – bass (tracks 9, 16), guitar (track 9), strings (track 9), synthesizer (track 9), backing vocals (track 16), keyboards (track 16), synthesizer (track 16)
- Ash Howes – programming (track 6)
- Louis Lion – programming (track 6)
- Troy Miller – backing vocals (track 11), bass guitar (track 11), clavinet (track 11), guitar (track 11), percussion (track 11), drums (track 11), programming (track 11), Rhodes piano (track 11), synthesizer (track 11)
- PhD – programming (track 1)
- Johny Saarde – drum programming (track 1)
- Danny Shah – backing vocals (tracks 12, 16)
- Nico Stadi – guitar (tracks 2–3), bass (tracks 2–3), keyboards (tracks 2–3), strings (tracks 2–3), string arranger (tracks 2–3), drum programming (tracks 2–3)
- Biff Stannard – backing vocals (track 6), keyboards (track 6), drums (track 8)
- Thomas Totten – guitar (tracks 4, 10, 14–15)
- Peter Wallevik – rhythm guitar (track 1), keyboards (track 1), drum programming (track 1)

=== Technical ===
- Kylie Minogue – vocal engineer (all tracks excluding 1 & 16)
- Sky Adams – engineer (tracks 4–5, 7, 9–10, 13–16)
- Dick Beetham – engineer (tracks 1–15)
- Duck Blackwell – engineer (track 8)
- PhD – producer (track 1)
- Teemu Brunila – engineer (tracks 2–3)
- Daniel Davidsen – producer (track 1)
- Guy Massey – engineer (tracks 4, 7, 9–15)
- Troy Miller – engineer (track 11)
- Alex Robinson – engineer (track 1)
- Nico Stadi – engineer (tracks 2–3)
- Biff Stannard – engineer (track 8)
- Peter Wallevik – producer (track 1)

=== Recording studios ===
- 360 Mastering; Hastings, UK (all songs)
- Biffco Studios; Brighton (track 6, 8)
- Fluff!; London, UK (4)
- Infinite Disco; (Note: Minogue's home recording studio.) London, UK (track 2, 3, 5, 7, 8, 10, 11, 13–15)
- Metropolis Studios; London, UK (track 1)
- Phrased Differently; London, UK (track 9, 12, 16)
- Pulse Music; Silver Lake, Los Angeles, California (track 2, 3)
- Rabbit Villa; Turku, Finland (track 2, 3, 13)
- SARM Studios; London, UK (track 14, 15)
- Spark Studio; London, UK (track 11)
- Sky's Home Studio; Bedfordshire, UK (track 4, 5, 7, 10, 13)

== Charts ==
=== Weekly charts ===
Weekly chart performance for Disco
Chart (2020)	Peak position
Australian Albums (ARIA)	1
Austrian Albums (Ö3 Austria)	7
Belgian Albums (Ultratop Flanders)	6
Belgian Albums (Ultratop Wallonia)	10
Canadian Albums (Billboard)	17
Czech Albums (ČNS IFPI)	15
Danish Vinyl Albums (Hitlisten)	19
Dutch Albums (Album Top 100)	11
Finnish Albums (Suomen virallinen lista)	17
French Albums (SNEP)	8
German Albums (Offizielle Top 100)	3
Hungarian Albums (MAHASZ)	33
Irish Albums (Official Charts)	4
Irish Independent Albums (IRMA)	1
Italian Albums (FIMI)	29
Japan Hot Albums (Billboard Japan)	65
Japanese Albums (Oricon)	64
New Zealand Albums (RMNZ)	9
Polish Albums (ZPAV)	21
Portuguese Albums (AFP)	15
Scottish Albums (Official Charts)	1
Slovak Albums (ČNS IFPI)	33
Spanish Albums (Promusicae)	8
Swedish Albums (Sverigetopplistan)	15
Swiss Albums (Schweizer Hitparade)	4
Swiss Albums (Les charts Romandy)	6
UK Albums (Official Charts)	1
UK Independent Albums (Official Charts)	1
US Billboard 200	26
US Independent Albums (Billboard)	4
US Top Dance Albums (Billboard)	1

=== Year-end charts ===
Year-end chart performance for Disco
Chart (2020)	Position
Australian Albums (ARIA)	62
UK Albums (OCC)	33

== Certifications ==
Region	Certification	Certified units/sales
Japan	—	2,980
United Kingdom (BPI)	Gold	179,892
United States	—	35,000

== Release history ==
Release dates and formats for Disco
Region	Date	Format	Editions	Label	Ref.
Various	6 November 2020	Cassette; CD; Digital download; LP; Streaming	Standard; Deluxe	Darenote; BMG	
Various	12 November 2020	Digital download	Super deluxe	Darenote; BMG	
Japan	25 November 2020	CD	Japanese edition	BMG; Warner	
Brazil	5 December 2020	CD	Standard	BMG; Warner	
Various	12 November 2021	CD; CD+DVD+Blu-ray; LP; digital download; streaming	Guest List Edition	Darenote; BMG	
Brazil	26 November 2021	CD	Guest List Edition	BMG; Warner	
Various	10 December 2021	LP; digital download; streaming	Extended Mixes	Darenote; BMG	

== See also ==
- List of number-one albums of 2020 (Australia)
- List of Irish Independent Albums Chart number ones of 2020
- List of number-one albums of 2020 (Scotland)
- List of UK Albums Chart number ones of the 2020s
- List of UK top-ten albums in 2020
- List of Billboard number-one electronic albums of 2020
