= Supernova (Kylie Minogue song) =

2020 song by Kylie Minogue

- Artwork used on Minogue's YouTube channel.

Song by Kylie Minogue

from the album Disco
- Released: 6 November 2020
- Recorded: 2019
- Studio: Sky's Home (Bedfordshire); Infinite Disco (London, England)
- Genre: Disco; electropop
- Length: 3:18
- Label: BMG; Darenote
- Songwriters: Minogue; Maegan Cottone; Sky Adams
- Producer: Adams

Audio
- "Supernova" on YouTube

"Supernova" is a song by Australian singer Kylie Minogue. It appears as the fifth track on Minogue's fifteenth studio album, Disco (2020). The song was co-written by Minogue, Maegan Cottone and its producer Sky Adams, and was inspired by celestial imagery and intergalactic themes, in contrast to the parent album's traditional and contemporary disco sound. Musically, it is a 1970s disco-inspired track that is sonically similar to Minogue's previous albums Light Years (2000) and Fever (2001), as well as other music acts. An extended version of the song was included on the remix album Disco: Extended Mixes (2021).

Music critics praised "Supernova" for its over-the-top production, instrumentation, and Minogue's vocal performance. Some critics praised its intergalactic influences, while others saw it as aggressive. Despite not being released as a single, it reached number 48 on the Hot Dance/Electronic Songs chart in the United States the release week of Disco. Furthermore, "Supernova" was used as a lip-sync song twice on the American reality television series RuPaul's Drag Race, once in season one of RuPaul's Drag Race: UK vs. the World and again in season seven of RuPaul's Drag Race All Stars.

== Writing and development ==
Minogue began working on new music in 2019, after completing the promotion for her fourteenth studio album, Golden (2018), and subsequent tour. During her tour, she was inspired by a segment influenced by the disco aesthetic and Studio 54, and she realised that her creative path would be "heading straight back to the dance floor" with a disco-themed album. However, due to the COVID-19 pandemic and widespread lockdowns, production ceased. During the lockdown, Minogue worked remotely from her London home, experimenting with different software and engineering tools such as Logic Pro and GarageBand.

Minogue wrote "Supernova" with American singer-songwriter Maegan Cottone and producer Sky Adams, who also collaborated on other Disco tracks. Minogue expressed in an Apple Music review that she has always been inspired by "celestial words and imagery" and wanted to incorporate them into her music. Minogue was also inspired to give "Supernova" a "slightly spacey" sound to distinguish it from traditional and contemporary interpretations of disco music throughout the parent album. Minogue used Adams' baby name, Jupiter, as a reference to the song's space theme in one of its lyrics.

== Composition ==
"There's a vocoder voice at the start of the song. In my mind, it's the voice of a little space creature who's my friend in the song. I'm always drawn to celestial words and imagery, so this was a fun chance to play with all those elements [...] If you weren't awake before 'Supernova', you're awake by the time it starts."

— Minogue talking about the development of "Supernova".

"Supernova" lasts three minutes and 18 seconds and is the fifth track on Disco. "Supernova" is musically and lyrically inspired by disco music from the 1970s and intergalactic themes from that era. The track also features heavy vocoder effects on Minogue's vocal deliveries. According to Beats Per Minute writer Mathew Barton, the track's composition consists of a "fabulous concoction of electric piano, throbbing bassline, strings, and better vocal production that enhances rather than detracts from the rest of the song."

Because the parent album incorporates various disco trends, "Supernova" was musically compared to other projects. Pitchfork writer Katherine St. Asap compared its "metallic robo-chassis vocal effects, the intergalactic metaphor collision, and the desperate, high-key lust memorably" to notable 1970s disco music, notably the song "I Lost My Heart to a Starship Trooper" by Sarah Brightman and Hot Gossip. CJ Thorpe-Tracey of The Quietus described it as an homage to Minogue's collaborations with Stock, Aitken, and Waterman, "plus the song throws tons of random planet names and space-science words at the wall and quite a few of them stick."

Clash editor Robin Murray compared the track to Italian DJ and composer Giorgio Moroder, describing it as "slinky Euro-centric perversions adding a dose of strings to her lyrical double entendres", while Mick Jacobs of Spectrum Culture compared it to Minogue's 2001 album Fever. Lisa Wright of DIY compared the sound to that of the German group Boney M and the American drag queen RuPaul while DNA writer Marc Andrews compared the track to the work of French music duo Daft Punk and Minogue's work from her 2000 album Light Years.

== Critical response ==
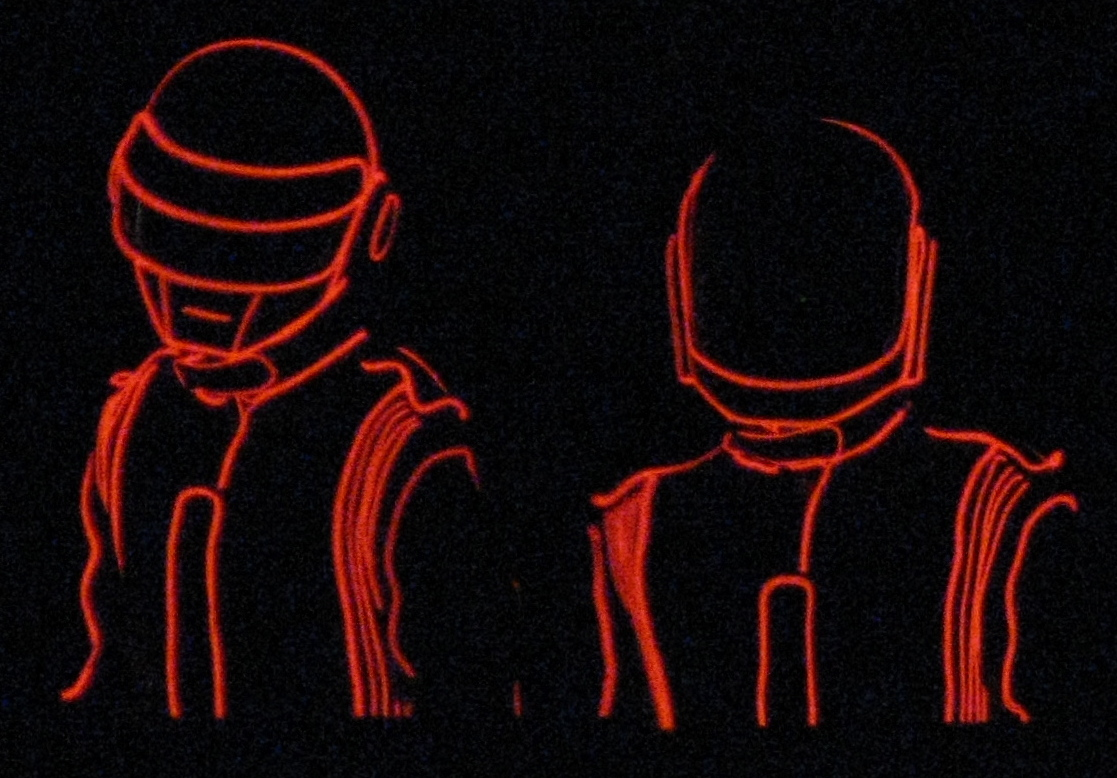
Several critics and publications compared "Supernova" to various musical acts, including French music duo Daft Punk (pictured).

“Supernova” received positive reviews from music critics. Neil Z. Yeung of AllMusic praised the song as a "intergalactic frenzy", while Lisa-Marie Ferla of The Arts Desk called it "robotic funk". Similarly, Gerald Biggerstaff of Instinct cited it as one of the album's highlights. Richard Wiggens of God Is in the TV praised the song's disco influence, writing, "she is able to craft simple, perfectly structured pop songs". CJ Thrope-Tracey from The Quietus described the track as "killer fun". Will Stroude, Christian Guiltenane, and Kieran Lacini contributed to a track-by-track review for Attitude, with Lacini calling the chorus "sensational" and Guiltenane praising the song's verses and "sassy" chorus.

When comparing the first half of the record, Katherine St. Asap of Pitchfork wrote that "Kylie's voice has more bite and life than all the above tracks combined" and praised the latter portion of the track by writing that she "works with her voice, not against it". Grindr staff praised Minogue's vocal deliveries, comparing the vocoder effects to Daft Punk, and wrote, "Kylie really rises to the challenge with a gutsy and lusty performance that underlines what an underrated pop vocalist she is." Mathew Marson of Beats Per Minute praised the album's "strongest" midsection, citing "Supernova" as a contributor; Marson described the track as "aggressive and dynamic".

Sal Cinquemani of Slant Magazine called "Supernova" and album track "Last Chance" her "most unabashedly aggressive in years". Matt Bagwell of the Huffington Post praised the song's energy, saying, "It's basically poppers in musical form." Variety writer Andrew Barker described the song as a "rough patch" with "its heavily processed, monotone vocal tracks, is crying out for a more postmodern, Gaga-esque flamboyance than Minogue is willing to provide..." According to Jeffrey Davis of PopMatters, the song and album track "Miss a Thing" were overproduced with "manic sounds and manipulated vocals".

== Promotion ==
“Supernova” was not released as a single by Disco, but rather with the album's release on 6 November 2020, in digital and physical formats. Nonetheless, it achieved some chart success during the album's release week. In the United States, it spent one week at number 48 on the Hot Dance/Electronic Songs chart. On November 7, she performed the song during her live stream concert Infinite Disco; this version was included in the live releases and DVD of the concert, as well as the repackaged version of Disco: Guest List Edition (2021). Additionally, an extended version was included on the remix album Disco: Extended Mixes (2021), which was initially available on vinyl and later through digital and streaming services.

"Supernova" was featured as a lip-sync song twice on the American reality television show RuPaul's Drag Race. It made its debut on the final episode of the first season of RuPaul's Drag Race: UK vs. the World, performed by American drag queen Mo Heart and Irish drag queen Blu Hydrangea; the latter won the lip-sync and overall competition. "Supernova" was used again as a lip-sync song on the seventh season of RuPaul's Drag Race All Stars, where it was performed by American drag queens Shea Coulee and Monét X Change. Coulee won the lip-sync performance. Coulee and X Change's lip-sync was uploaded on YouTube on 23 July 2023.

== Track listing ==
Album version

1. "Supernova" - 3:18

Extended version

1. "Supernova" - 4:56

== Credits and personnel ==
Credits adapted from the liner notes of Disco.

- Kylie Minogue – songwriter, lead vocals, background vocals, vocal engineer, vocoder engineer
- Sky Adams - songwriter, producer, backing vocals, guitar, synthesiser, drums, programming,
- Maegan Cottone - songwriter
- Cherokee - vocoder engineer
- Dick Beetham - audio master

== Charts ==
Chart performance for "Supernova"
Chart (2020)	Peak position
US Hot Dance/Electronic Songs (Billboard)	48

== Release history ==
Release dates and formats for "Supernova"
Region	Date	Version	Format	Label	Ref.
Various	6 November 2020	Album version	Digital download; streaming	BMG; Darenote	
Various	8 December 2020	Extended mix	Digital download; streaming	BMG; Darenote	
