= Real Groove =

2020 single by Kylie Minogue

Single by Kylie Minogue and Dua Lipa (Note: Dua Lipa only appears on the Studio 2054 remix of "Real Groove". She is credited as a featured artist on the Initial Talk remix of the song and the 7-inch vinyl.)

from the album Disco
- Released: 31 December 2020
- Recorded: 2020
- Studio: Pulse, Silver Lake; Rabbit Villa, Turku; Infinite Disco, London; Assault & Battery, London (Note: Studio 2054 remix); Flux, New York City
- Genre: Disco-pop
- Length: 3:14; 4:22 (Studio 2054 remix)
- Label: Darenote; BMG
- Songwriters: Kylie Minogue; Teemu Brunila; Nico Stadi; Alida Garpestad Peck
- Producers: Nico Stadi; Teemu Brunila; William Bowerman

Kylie Minogue singles chronology
"Magic" (2020)	"Real Groove" (2020)	"Starstruck" (Kylie Minogue remix) (2021)

Dua Lipa singles chronology
"Prisoner" (2020)	"Real Groove" (Studio 2054 remix) (2020)	"We're Good" (2021)

Audio video
- "Real Groove" on YouTube

"Real Groove" is a song by Australian singer Kylie Minogue from her fifteenth studio album, Disco (2020). The song was written by Minogue, Teemu Brunila, Nico Stadi and Alida Garpestad Peck, with a sense of optimism for days ahead during the COVID-19 pandemic. Brunila and Stadi also handled the production. It is a disco-pop song with house and R&B elements and features vocoders, a funk bass and post-disco synths. The lyrics see Minogue attempting to win an ex back. A new version, a duet with English singer Dua Lipa entitled "Studio 2054 remix", was released on 31 December 2020 as the album's third single by Darenote and BMG. The remix added William Bowerman as a producer with additional instrumentation and Lipa incorporating layered vocals and new lyrics.

Several critics compared "Real Groove" to the works of Daft Punk and of Lipa, particularly her second studio album, Future Nostalgia (2020). Some also appreciated the song's production. Commercially, the song reached number 95 on the UK Singles Chart while also charting within the top 100 of charts in Croatia and Hungary. It also reached number 15 on the US Hot Dance/Electronic Songs chart. In late 2020, Minogue performed the song live at her Infinite Disco livestream concert, Lipa's Studio 2054 livestream concert and The Jonathan Ross Show. It was further promoted through remixes by Cheap Cuts, Claus Neonors and Initial Talk. The latter remix was chosen by Billboard as one of the best dance songs of 2021.

== Background and composition ==
"Real Groove" was co-written by Kylie Minogue, Teemu Brunila, Nico Stadi and Alida Garpestad Peck, with Brunila and Stadi also handling the production. The song was written and recorded during the COVID-19 pandemic with a sense of optimism for brighter days ahead. Due to lockdowns associated with the pandemic, Minogue recorded her own vocals from a home studio using GarageBand. Because of this, she found herself doing a lot more takes than she usually would to the point where she had to back away from her laptop; "Real Groove" was one of the songs that she did the most takes on. The singer desired to take the melody down half a tone and experimented with doing the song lower, but ultimately she realized that the higher notes were the "sweet spot". Minogue stated that the song was "worth the effort" and that the listener does not know what is coming before it ends up "really pumping". The song was recorded at Pulse Music Group in Silver Lake, Los Angeles, Rabbit Villa in Turku and Infinite Disco in London. The mastering was handled by Dick Beetham at 360 Mastering in Hastings, UK.

"Real Groove"
A disco-pop song set to a funk bass and 1980s-styled strings, "Real Groove" sees Minogue singing about love being gained, lost and found, using Europop vocal melodies and Auto-Tune.

Musically, "Real Groove" is a 1980s-influenced disco-pop song with house and R&B elements. The song has a funky feel and uses vocoders, a slinky rhythm, post-disco synths, throbbing funk bass slaps, slithering 1980s-styled strings, talk box effects and digital editing. Minogue uses Auto-Tuned sultry and rubbery vocals as well as Europop-inspired vocal melodies. The lyrics talk about love being gained, lost and found again, with Minogue attempting to win her ex back. The Studio 2054 remix adds vocals by English singer Dua Lipa and production from William Bowerman. It was also mastered by Beetham at the same location while recording took place at Assault & Battery in London and Flux Studios in New York City. Minogue and Lipa recorded the remix after the positive reaction to their performance at Lipa's Studio 2054 livestream concert. The remix increases the tempo and has an electro-disco production that introduces new layered instrumentation including funk snaps and bouncing disco beats. Lipa layers her vocals onto the chorus. The Initial Talk Studio 2054 remix was remixed at Room 1989 in Tokyo. It is a 1980s-styled, retro synth-pop track with the producer separating the previously layered vocals.

== Release and promotion ==
"Real Groove" was released as the third track on Minogue's fifteenth studio album Disco through Darenote and BMG on 6 November 2020. Prior to its release, Minogue teased that the song might be the album's third single on social media. Minogue first performed the song during her Infinite Disco livestream concert, which was broadcast worldwide on 7 November 2020. However, the full performance of the song was uploaded to the singer's YouTube channel the previous day. On 27 November 2020, Minogue performed the song as a duet with Lipa during the latter's Studio 2054 livestream concert. The performance took place in a New York City boiler room rave-styled set that featured DJ Buck Betty on a DJ Deck performing. Minogue jumped on the DJ deck for the performance; the two also performed a duet version of Lipa's song "Electricity" (2018). On 5 December 2020, Minogue performed the song on The Jonathan Ross Show. The song was further promoted through Instagram, where fans could dance for an hour to it with a Minogue avatar that was created using Facebook's Creative Shop and Spark AR.

In December 2020, Minogue confirmed that "Real Groove" would serve as the third single from Disco during her appearance on Graham Norton's Saturday Morning Show on BBC Radio 2. The cover art for the song was revealed by the station on 24 December 2020, with Mike Wass of Idolator noting the "clean lines and general flawlessness" while saying it is reminiscent of the singer's Fever (2001) era. Around the same time, rumours that Lipa would feature on an alternate version of the song began circling. A remix of "Real Groove" with Lipa, entitled "Studio 2054 remix" was released for digital download and streaming on 31 December 2020 as a single. An extended play featuring the two singles alongside remixes of the song by Cheap Cuts and Claus Neonors was released on 20 January 2021. The former remix channels throwback Daft Punk sounds while the latter is a more traditional remix. On 5 March 2021, a remix of the Studio 2054 remix by Initial Talk was released. A 7-inch single of "Real Groove" and the Studio 2054 remix was released on 30 April. The Studio 2054 remix and the Studio 2054 Initial Talk remix were later added to the album's 12 November 2021-released reissue Disco: Guest List Edition, serving as the 20th and 25th tracks respectively. An extended mix of the song appeared on the album's extended mixes version, released 10 December 2021.

== Critical reception ==
For DIY, Lisa Wright said the song "comes in like the PG cousin" of Lipa's "Hallucinate" (2020). Nick Levine of NME named the song a "funky strut" while noting that it "wouldn't sound out of place" on Lipa's second studio album Future Nostalgia (2020). HuffPost's Matt Bagwell also compared the song to the album. In Slant Magazine, Sal Cinquemani complimented the use of talk boxes and digital editing in the production, stating they add "sonic interest". Clash writer Robin Murray stated the song "more than delivers on its title". Writing for musicOMH, Nick Smith viewed the song as "sassy" and a "funky affair" while noting influences from Daft Punk. In Variety, Andrew Barker also compared the song to Daft Punk's works and named it a highlight on Disco. He went on by stating it "simply focuses on proving that, at 52, she's still capable of filling a dance floor as well as anyone half her age". In a review for Billboard, Gil Kaufman observed "silk shirt Tony Manero vibes" in the song.

Konstantinos Pappis of Our Culture Mag named "Real Groove" a highlight on the album and called it "smooth and slinky". In a review from Associated Press, Cristina Jaleru complimented the "Daft Punk-esque undertones". Wass called the song a "funky banger" that opens with a "chunky bass line". God Is in the T.V.'s Richard Wiggins praised the song for being "unashamedly groovy and retro but with updated sensibilities to suit the palette of today's pop audiences". For the BBC, Nick Levine named the song a "funky strut", while Mark Sutherland of Music Week called it a floorfiller and party-starter. The song was named a highlight on the album by Ahad Sanwari for V and Paper's Shaad D'Souza said it "pull us out of a funk and onto the dancefloor". The staff of Rolling Stone called the song a "a perfect slice of dancefloor disco-pop".

Wass called the Studio 2054 remix of "Real Groove" a "shimmery banger". Jordan Robledo of the Gay Times called the remix an "epic collaboration" while complimenting the "incredible" synths and the production "that will surely get fans dancing all night long". Uproxx's Derrick Rossignol said the remix is "a ton of fun" while comparing it to Future Nostalgia. Kaufman complimented Lipa's vocals, saying she perfectly melds them into the song. For The Line of Best Fit, Cerys Kenneally called it a "perfect fit" for Future Nostalgia. D'Souza praised the Studio 2054 Initial Talk remix for being "totally sublime, a little sinister, and altogether something [he] didn't know [he] needed at all". Billboard placed the Studio 2054 Initial Talk remix as one of the best dance songs of 2021, with writer Lucas Villa comparing it to Future Nostalgia and Minogue's early work. He additionally said it is an "irresistible remix" that "felt familiar, yet fresh, while reiterating Queen Kylie's staying power on the dance floor".

== Commercial performance ==
As an album track, "Real Groove" debuted at number 36 on the UK Independent Singles Chart. Following the release of the Studio 2054 remix, the remix entered the UK Singles Downloads Chart at number 25 with only one day of tracking. The following week, it debuted at number 95 on the UK Singles Chart while re-entering the Independent Singles Chart at number 27. Following its release on vinyl, the song re-entered the UK Singles Chart at number 97; it additionally re-entered the Independent Singles Chart at number 22 and the UK Singles Sales Chart at the summit. The song was the fourth best selling vinyl single of 2021 in the UK. In the US, the song entered the Hot Dance/Electronic Songs chart at number 26 as an album track. Following the release of the Studio 2054 remix, the song re-entered the chart at number 37 with one day of tracking, earning 811,000 streams that marked an increase of 468 percent. It peaked at number 15 the following week, becoming Minogue's highest charting single on the Hot Dance/Electronic Songs chart. The song spent a total of 12 weeks on the chart. "Real Groove" additionally charted at number 89 in Croatia, number 16 in Hungary and number 8 on the New Zealand Hot Singles Chart.

== Track listings ==
- Digital download and streaming – Studio 2054 remix
1. "Real Groove" (Studio 2054 remix) – 4:22
- Digital EP
1. "Real Groove" – 3:14
2. "Real Groove" (Studio 2054 remix) – 4:22
3. "Real Groove" (Cheap Cuts remix) – 4:24
4. "Real Groove" (Claus Neonors remix) – 3:50
- Digital download and streaming – Studio 2054 Initial Talk remix
1. "Real Groove" (featuring Dua Lipa) [Studio 2054 Initial Talk remix] – 3:43
- 7-inch vinyl
1. "Real Groove" – 3:14
2. "Real Groove" (featuring Dua Lipa) [Studio 2054 remix] – 4:22

== Personnel ==
- Kylie Minogue – vocals
- Teemu Brunila (Note: Teemu Brunila and Nico Stadi are solely credited as producers on the Studio 2054 remix of "Real Groove".) – production, guitar, drum programming
- Nico Stadi – production, guitar, bass, strings, string arrangement, keyboards, drum programming, mixing
- Dick Beetham – mastering
- Dua Lipa – vocals
- Izzy Chase – backing vocals
- Wilson Atie – backing vocals
- Elize Kellman – backing vocals
- Naomi Scarlett – backing vocals
- Ed Seed – guitar
- Alex Hancox – bass
- Stevie Blacke – cello, viola, violin, string arrangement
- Leah Zeger – violin
- Georgie Ward – piano, synthesizer
- Samson Jatto – drums
- Richie Kennedy – recording engineer, mixing
- John Muller – vocal recording engineer
- William Bowerman – production

== Charts ==
=== Weekly charts ===
Weekly chart performance for "Real Groove"
Chart (2020–2021)	Peak position
Croatia (HRT)	89
Hungary (Single Top 40)	16
New Zealand Hot Singles (RMNZ)	8
Portugal Airplay (AFP)	65
UK Singles (OCC)	95
UK Indie (OCC)	22
US Hot Dance/Electronic Songs (Billboard)	15

=== Year-end charts ===
Year-end chart performance for "Real Groove"
Chart (2021)	Position
US Hot Dance/Electronic Songs (Billboard)	100

== Release history ==
Release dates and formats for "Real Groove"
Region	Date	Format(s)	Version(s)	Label(s)	Ref.
Various	31 December 2020	Digital download; streaming	Studio 2054 remix	Darenote; BMG	
Various	20 January 2021	Digital download; streaming	EP	Darenote; BMG	
Various	5 March 2021	Digital download; streaming	Studio 2054 Initial Talk remix	Darenote; BMG	
Various	30 April 2021	7-inch single	Original; Studio 2054 remix	Darenote; BMG	
