= I Like It Like That =

I Like It Like That may refer to:

== Film ==
- I Like It Like That (film), a 1994 film starring Lauren Vélez and Jon Seda

== Music ==
=== Albums ===
- I Like It Like That (The Miracles album), 1964
- I Like It Like That (Dave Clark Five album), 1965
- I Like It Like That, a 1997 album by Tito Nieves

=== Songs ===
- "I Like It Like That" (Chris Kenner song), Chris Kenner & Allen Toussaint (1961), covered by the Dave Clark Five, The Nashville Teens, Loggins and Messina
- "I Like It Like That" (The Miracles song), Robinson & Tarplin (1964)
- "I Like It Like That" (Pete Rodriguez song), a 1967 song first sung by Pete Rodriguez, subsequently rendered by the Blackout All-Stars and other artists
- "I Like It Like That" (Per Gessle song) (2006)
- "I Like It Like That" (Hot Chelle Rae song) (2011)
- "I Like It Like That", a 1965 Van Morrison song by Them on The Angry Young Them
- "I Like It Like That", a 2025 song by Fcukers

== See also ==
- Like It Like That (disambiguation)
- I Like It (disambiguation)
