= I Love It (Kylie Minogue song) =

2020 promotional single by Kylie Minogue

Promotional single by Kylie Minogue

from the album Disco
- Released: 23 October 2020
- Studio: Biffco Studios (Brighton, England); Infinite Disco (London, England)
- Genre: Disco
- Length: 3:50
- Label: Darenote; BMG
- Songwriter(s): Kylie Minogue; Richard Stannard; Duck Blackwell
- Producer(s): Richard Stannard; Duck Blackwell

Audio video
- "I Love It" on YouTube

"I Love It" is a song by Australian singer-songwriter Kylie Minogue from her 15th studio album Disco (2020). It was released by Darenote and BMG on 23 October 2020. Minogue co-wrote the song with its producers Richard Stannard and Duck Blackwell.

== Release ==
Following the release of "Say Something" and "Magic", Minogue took to her socials to announce that "I Love It" would be released on 23 October 2020, posting a clip of the song accompanied by a graphic bearing the song's title.

A five-track EP was released, containing "I Love It", the first two singles from Disco, as well as two remixes of "Magic", and a following audio video of the song was uploaded to Minogue's YouTube account.

== Composition ==
"I Love It" is a disco song, running for a length of three minutes and fifty seconds. Minogue co-wrote the song alongside its producers Richard Stannard and Duck Blackwell.

== Track listing ==
Digital download

1. "I Love It" - 3:50
2. "Magic" – 4:10
3. "Say Something" – 3:32
4. "Magic" (Nick Reach Up Remix) – 3:10
5. "Magic" (Purple Disco Machine Remix) – 3:35

== Live performances ==
Minogue debuted "I Love It" live during her Infinite Disco live stream, where it opened the show.

== Charts ==
Chart performance for "I Love It"
Chart (2020)	Peak position
Scotland (OCC)	28
UK Singles Downloads (OCC)	25
US Hot Dance/Electronic Songs (Billboard)	38

== Release history ==
Release dates and formats for "I Love It"
Region	Date	Format	Label	Ref.
Various	23 October 2020	Digital download; streaming	Darenote; BMG	
