= Like It Like That =

Like It Like That may refer to:

- Like It Like That (album), an album by Guy Sebastian
- "Like It Like That" (A Tribe Called Quest song), 1998
- "Like It Like That" (Guy Sebastian song), 2009
- "Like It Like That", a song by Regurgitator from their debut EP, Regurgitator

== See also ==
- I Like It Like That (disambiguation)
