= Love It =

Love It may refer to:

- Love it!, a British weekly magazine
- Love It (album), a 2009 Japanese album by Ai Otsuka
- "Love It", a 1979 single by Nona Hendryx
- "Love It" (song), a 2001 song by Bilal

== See also ==
- I Love It (disambiguation)
