= List of Irish Independent Albums Chart number ones of 2020 =

This is a list of albums that reached number-one on the Irish Independent Albums Chart in 2020. The charts were compiled by Irish Recorded Music Association (IRMA).

== Chart history ==
List of Irish Independent Albums Chart number-one albums of 2020
Issue date	Album	Artist	Label	Ref
3 January	Live at the Olympia	The Coronas	So Far So Good	
10 January	Erratic Cinematic	Gerry Cinnamon	Little Runaway	
17 January	A Beginners Guide to Bravery	David Keenan	Rubyworks	
24 January	Erratic Cinematic	Gerry Cinnamon	Little Runaway	
31 January	Hotspot	Pet Shop Boys	x2	
7 February	Erratic Cinematic	Gerry Cinnamon	Little Runaway	
14 February	Erratic Cinematic	Gerry Cinnamon	Little Runaway	
21 February	Teenage Wildlife: 25 Years of Ash	Ash	Echo	
28 February	Map of the Soul: 7	BTS	Big Hit	
6 March	Loving Everywhere I Go	Hudson Taylor	Rubyworks	
13 March	How I'm Feeling	Lauv	Lauv	
20 March	Citizens of Boomtown	The Boomtown Rats	BMG	
27 March	How I'm Feeling	Lauv	Lauv	
3 April	ADHD	Joyner Lucas	Twenty Nine Music Group	
10 April	ADHD	Joyner Lucas	Twenty Nine Music Group	
17 April	How I'm Feeling	Lauv	Lauv	
24 April	The Bonny	Gerry Cinnamon	Little Runaway	
1 May	The Bonny	Gerry Cinnamon	Little Runaway	
8 May	The Bonny	Gerry Cinnamon	Little Runaway	
15 May	The Bonny	Gerry Cinnamon	Little Runaway	
22 May	The Bonny	Gerry Cinnamon	Little Runaway	
29 May	Dissimulation	KSI	RBC	
5 June	Dissimulation	KSI	RBC	
12 June	Dissimulation	KSI	RBC	
19 June	One Day at a Time	Kodaline	B-Unique	
26 June	Punisher	Phoebe Bridgers	Dead Oceans	
3 July	Dissimulation	KSI	RBC	
10 July	Dissimulation	KSI	RBC	
17 July	Dissimulation	KSI	RBC	
24 July	Dissimulation	KSI	RBC	
31 July	Alive - Cork Opera House 2019	Mick Flannery	Rosaleen	
7 August	True Love Waits	The Coronas	So Far So Good	
14 August	A Hero's Death	Fontaines D.C.	Partisan	
21 August	A Hero's Death	Fontaines D.C.	Partisan	
28 August	Clouds	Walking on Cars	Walking On Cars	
4 September	A Hero's Death	Fontaines D.C.	Partisan	
11 September	Tattletales	6ix9ine	ScumGang	
18 September	A Hero's Death	Fontaines D.C.	Partisan	
25 September	RTJ4	Run the Jewels	BMG	
2 October	Ultra Mono	Idles	Partisan	
9 October	Róisín Machine	Róisín Murphy	Skint	
16 October	Revelino	Revelino	Mercenary	
23 October	No Sound Ever Dies	Emperor of Ice Cream	Fifa	
30 October	AM	Arctic Monkeys	Domino	
6 November	AM	Arctic Monkeys	Domino	
13 November	Disco	Kylie Minogue	BMG	
20 November	Young Dumb Thrills	McFly	BMG	
27 November	Be	BTS	Big Hit	
4 December	Anniversary Collection - The Best Of	Nathan Carter	Sharpe Music	
11 December	Anniversary Collection - The Best Of	Nathan Carter	Sharpe Music	
18 December	A Holly Dolly Christmas	Dolly Parton	Butterfly/12Tone Music	
25 December	Anniversary Collection - The Best of	Nathan Carter	Sharpe Music	

== See also ==
- List of number-one albums of 2020 (Ireland)
- List of number-one singles of 2020 (Ireland)
