= I Luv It =

I Luv It may refer to:

- "I Luv It" (Tha Eastsidaz song), 2001
- "I Luv It" (Young Jeezy song), 2006
- "I Luv It" (Psy song), 2017
- "I Luv It" (Camila Cabello song), 2024
- "I Luv It", song by Switch from Switch V, 1981
- "I Luv It", song by Mr. Serv-On from Da Next Level, 1999
- "I Luv It", song by Juice Symbolyc One (S1) production discography, 2009
- "I Luv It", song by Sleek Louch from Silverback Gorilla 2, 2015

== See also ==
- I Love It (disambiguation)
