= Say Something (Kylie Minogue song) =

2020 single by Kylie Minogue

Single by Kylie Minogue

from the album Disco
- B-side: "Say Something" (acoustic)
- Released: 23 July 2020
- Recorded: 2019
- Studio: Biffco Studios (Brighton, England)
- Genre: Disco; dance-pop; electropop; synth-pop
- Length: 3:32
- Label: Darenote; BMG
- Songwriters: Kylie Minogue; Jonathan Green; Ash Howes; Richard "Biff" Stannard
- Producers: Jon Green; Biff Stannard

Kylie Minogue singles chronology
"On oublie le reste" (2019)	"Say Something" (2020)	"Magic" (2020)

Music video
- "Say Something" on YouTube

"Say Something" is a song by Australian singer Kylie Minogue. BMG Rights Management and Minogue's company Darenote released it as the lead single from her fifteenth studio album Disco (2020), which was distributed digitally and physically on July 23, 2020. Minogue co-wrote the song with Ash Howes, Jonathan Green, and long-time collaborator Richard "Biffco" Stannard, and produced by Green and Stannard. Musically, it is a disco-inspired track with dance-pop, electro-pop, and synth-pop influences. Inspired by the COVID-19 pandemic and lockdown procedures, the song's lyrics explore themes of love and a call for unity.

“Say Something” received widespread acclaim by music critics for its production quality, overall sound, and songwriting. Furthermore, many critics regarded this as one of Minogue's best works, and it was shortlisted for Song of the Year at the 2021 APRA Music Awards. The song had a moderate commercial success, appearing on record charts in Belgium, Croatia, Hungary, the United Kingdom, and the United States, as well as component charts in Australia, New Zealand, and throughout Europe. The song was certified gold in Brazil by Pro-Música Brasil after exceeding 20,000 unit sales.

British filmmaker Sophie Muller shot the music video for the single in London, England, and depicts Minogue riding through space on a golden horse sculpture while adhering to social distancing measures imposed by the COVID-19 pandemic. Minogue further promoted the single by performing it on several live television shows including The Tonight Show Starring Jimmy Fallon and Good Morning America, as well as on the setlist and live release of her one-time special livestream show Infinite Disco.

== Writing and development ==
Minogue began working on new music in 2019, after wrapping up promotion for her fourteenth studio album, Golden (2018), and subsequent tour. While on tour, she was inspired by a themed Studio 54 segment at the tour, and realised about her creative direction would be "heading straight back to the dance floor" with a third disco-themed album. During the tour, Minogue started writing new songs with longtime collaborators Ash Howes, Jonathan Green, and Richard "Biffco" Stannard early in the production process. However, due to the COVID-19 pandemic and widespread lockdowns, the joint production was suspend. During the lockdown, Minogue worked remotely from her London home, experimenting with various programmes and engineering tools such as Logic Pro and GarageBand.

Minogue co-wrote "Say Something" with Ash Howes, Jonathan Green, and longtime collaborator Stannard, and it was one of first tracks recorded for Disco. According to Minogue, collaborative efforts for the song "dropped from the sky" after experimenting with specific beats, with Howes, Green, and Stannard providing the demo vocals and recording them into a microphone. The track was recorded in Brighton, England, with Dick Beetham as the engineer and Louis Lion assisting with programming. Minogue provided additional engineering and vocal production on her home in London, while Duck Blackwell mixed the song.

== Composition ==
"You need a rest after "Supernova", and "Say Something" is a chance to calm down and reflect a little. It’s one of those songs that just dropped from the sky. I recorded it in my first session, before I even had a timeline or an album planned... It started as a beat, and we were all just singing into a microphone to capture everything. The 'love is love' part is almost like a different song, but somehow it lives with the rest of it. The song literally spilled out of us that day."

— Minogue talking about the development of "Say Something".

"Say Something" is a three-minute, 32-second disco-inspired track with electronic dance elements such as dance-pop, electro-pop, and synth-pop. Instrumentally, the song includes "thick" synths, drum crashes, a funk guitar, and a choir section provided by the House Gospel Choir. Robbin Murray of Clash compared the song's sound to "Honey" by Swedish singer Robyn, writing that it "leans once more on those bubbling electronics, recalling Robyn's 'Honey' is its cutting edge digi-pop." While reviewing Disco, The Guardian editor Michael Cragg felt the song and album track "Magic" were inspired by 1970s and 1980s disco, with "buffed staccato strings, lithe rhythm guitar, and gold-plated choruses..."

Helen Brown of The Independent wrote that "Saying Something" features "all throbbing intergalactic synths, intoxicating layers of vocal and murky guitar riffs," while NME editor Nick Levine described it as "a cosmic slow-burn with Bowie-esque guitar licks." Pitchfork contributor Katherine St. Asaph thought the song was the least "disco"-inspired on the album, writing that its progression has "no real chorus and almost no structure at all." According to Sal Cinquemani of Slant Magazine, the song is a "midtempo synth-pop sleeper" similar to Minogue's previous lead singles "All the Lovers" and "Into the Blue." He describes it as a “deceptive” introduction to the album’s sound.

Lyrically, the song is inspired by the effects of the COVID-19 lockdown, with themes of love and unity. Minogue stated that the lyrics are "about all of our eternal quest for love" and the search for "something or someone out there that you can relate to"; the lyrics "Love is love / It never ends / Can we all be as one again?" were given as an example for this theme. Rolling Stone editor Claire Shaffer echoed the track's impact during COVID-19, stating that it "feels pertinent for our quarantine days". Similarly, Katie Bain of Billboard wrote that the song sees Minogue "hitting the topical nail on the head," while Joshua Martin of MTV News described it as a "call for unity."

== Release ==
Two days before its initial release, media and publications reported Minogue's work on Disco and that "Say Something" would be released soon. Minogue announced the release of "Say Something" and Disco on 22 July 2020 via social media, with the former available the next day. It is the album's lead single from BMG Rights Management and Minogue's company Darenote, and it was first available as a digital single. An acoustic version of the song was released a month later in August. On 1 September, BMG and American label S-Curve released the track to dance radio stations across the United States.

Ten days later, Syn Cole's remix was released via digital and streaming platforms, and in October, a second acoustic version was recorded as part of the Apple Music at Home Sessions, which was distributed via Apple Music. On November 6, a vinyl was released exclusively through Minogue's webstore, featuring both the original version of the song and the first acoustic recording. Studio Moross created the cover art, which features a close-up of Minogue's lips in red lipstick.

== Critical reception ==
“Say Something” received widespread acclaim from music critics. Neil Z. Yeung of AllMusic chose it as one of the best songs from Disco, saying it was "not only a peak on Disco, it's also one of Minogue's best songs to date." Yeung later referred to it as a "rapturous anthem". Similarly, Helen Brown of The Independent named it one of the best tracks from Disco. Pitchfork editor Katherine St. Asaph called it one of the album's "strongest" tracks, praising the overall quality by writing "What's left is a luxuriant amount of space for Kylie to spiral higher, buoyed by rocket-exhaust sighs, airy choirs, and zero-irony affirmations."

Clash editor Lisa Wright said the track "bubbles along like a gleaming advert for an all-inclusive beach holiday," while The Guardian contributor Michael Cragg described it as a "heartfelt wallow of heightened emotions." Regarding the song's impact on the COVID-19 pandemic, Nick Levine of NME described it as "an elegant nod to pandemic ennui." Although praising the song, Slant Magazine writer Saw Cinquemani felt it "works better as a momentary respite among Disco otherwise frenetic middle stretch." Mike Wass of Idolator compared the song to Scissor Sisters and St. Vincent, praising its "majestic, serotonin-raising chorus".

Variety editor Jem Aswad described "Say Something" as one of the "best disco songs in recent memory," with a "irresistible chorus," a "driving rhythm," and "perhaps unintentionally relevant lyrics." Entertainment Weekly editor Joey Nolfi dubbed it a "mirrorball anthem" and described the song as "more than an ode to the lust for human connection in dark times, it's a poetic, surprisingly deep step forward" for Minogue. Kate Solomon of The Guardian described "Say Something" as a "quasi-disco bop with a slightly saccharine post-quarantine sentiment" that Minogue "carries perfectly". "Say Something" was ranked 95th on The 100 Best Songs of 2020 list by Billboard, and it was shortlisted for Song of the Year at the APRA Music Awards of 2021.

== Commercial performance ==
“Say Something” performed moderately after its release. The song did not appear on the ARIA Charts in Australia, but it did chart on two other providers: number 15 on Radiomonitor's airplay charts and number 5 on the Digital Songs chart on Billboard. In New Zealand, "Say Something" peaked at number 40 on the Hot Singles Chart for a single week. In Belgium, it peaked at 14 on the Bubbling Under chart in Flanders and 35 in Wallonia. In Croatia, it peaked at number 67 on their national airplay chart, while in Hungary, it reached number 15 on the Single Top 40 chart. It also peaked at number 17 on the Euro Digital Songs Sales chart, provided by Billboard.

In the United Kingdom, "Say Something" debuted at number 82 on the UK Singles Chart and eventually peaked at 56. It also peaked at number nine on the Download Singles chart and 11 on the Single Sales chart. According to the Official Charts Company, "Say Something" became her biggest airplay hit in the UK since "Get Outta My Way" (2010), and by February 2021, it had sold 75,555 units in the country. In the United States, it debuted at number three on the Dance/Electronic Digital Song Sales chart, number 35 on the Dance/Mix Show Airplay chart and number 18 on the Dance/Electronic Songs chart. According to Luminate (previously Neilsen/MRC), the track received 429,000 streams and 3,000 downloads in its first week in the United States.

== Music video ==
Minogue mounted on top of a golden horse sculpture, wearing a Halston-inspired dress worn by Marisa Berenson

The music video for "Say Something" was directed by British filmmaker Sophie Muller who had worked with Minogue a few times before. It was filmed at Black Island Studios in London, England, during a period of social distancing due to the COVID-19 pandemic. As a result, the video only features Minogue and the dancer, Kaner Flex. Minogue's fishnet catsuit and black and white dress were designed by Ed Marler, while the crystal mesh bodysuit was created by Gucci. The latter costume was inspired by a photograph of Marisa Berenson found by Minogue and Muller while researching Studio 54 themes.

The overall theme of the video was inspired by the disco aesthetic, which is carried over to the parent album. The "inter-galactic" video, which portrays Minogue as a Space Age Hollywood actress, is inspired by 1970s psychedelia and The Great Gatsby (1925). It shows the singer travelling through the universe while mounted on a golden horse sculpture, remembering a segment of the Aphrodite: Les Folies Tour in which Kylie climbed on a semelhant pegasus sculpture. But now, Kylie is shooting lasers from her hands and flying in a hovercraft. A behind-the-scenes video was also uploaded to Minogue's YouTube channel.

== Promotion ==
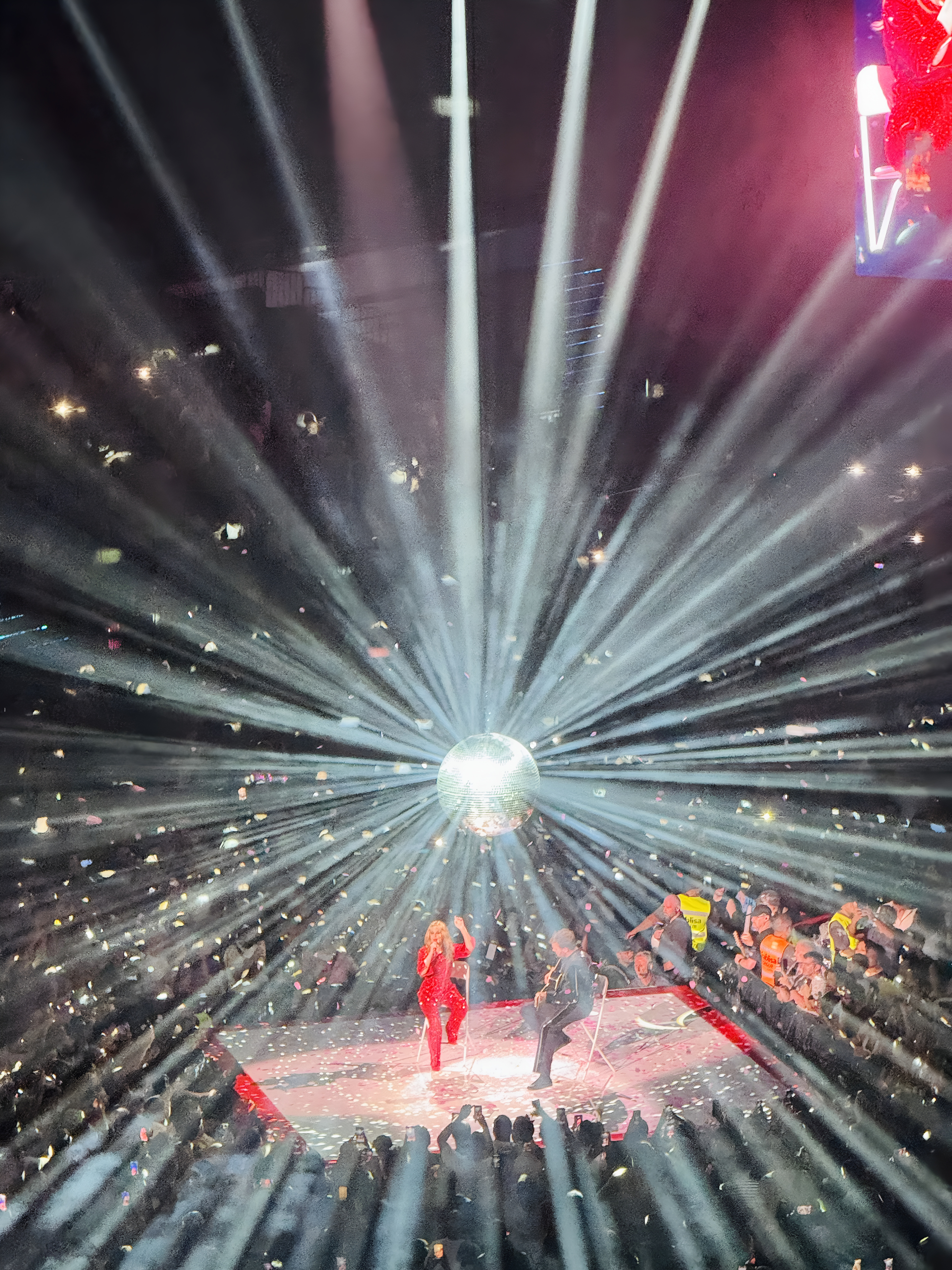
Minogue performing "Say Something" during the Tension Tour in Lisbon, Portugal

"Say Something" was used as the Channel 4 F1 outro for the 2020 Spanish Grand Prix, as well as appearing on the Netflix television series Never Have I Ever. Furthermore, Minogue made appearances on several television shows and live events to promote the song. On September 17, 2020, Minogue performed the song for the first time on The Tonight Show Starring Jimmy Fallon. According to Billboard, the performance was filmed remotely and recorded on a BBC News television camera from the 1980s, giving it a "vintage VHS tape filter" aesthetic. On September 19, 2020, Minogue performed an acoustic version of "Say Something" at the charity live concert I Love Beirut, organised by Lebanese singer Mika to benefit victims of the 2020 Beirut explosion.

On November 1, The Sound broadcast a performance from the upcoming concert special Infinite Disco. On November 6, she appeared on both The Zoe Ball Breakfast Show and Good Morning America. On November 7, she performed the song with members of The House Gospel Choir during her live stream concert 'Infinite Disco'; this version was included in the live releases and DVD of the concert, as well as the repackaged version of Disco: Guest List Edition (2021). "Say Something" was part of the set list of Minogue's sixteenth headlining concert tour, the Tension Tour (2025).

== Track listing ==
Digital download / streaming

1. "Say Something" – 3:32

Digital download / streaming – acoustic version

1. "Say Something" (acoustic) – 3:15
2. "Say Something" – 3:32

Digital download / streaming – Syn Cole remix

1. "Say Something" (Syn Cole remix) – 3:00

7-inch vinyl

1. "Say Something" – 3:32
2. "Say Something" (acoustic) – 3:15

Other versions

- F9 Club Mix – 6:34
- F9 Remix – 3:38

== Credits and personnel ==
- Kylie Minogue – lead vocals, writer, backing vocals and vocal production
- Louis Lion – programming
- Jon Green – writer, backing vocals, producer, guitar, keyboards
- Duck Blackwell – additional producer, keyboards, mixing engineer
- Dick Beetham – recording engineer
- Richard "Biff" Stannard – writer, backing vocals, producer, keyboards
- Ash Howes – writer, programming
- Adetoun Anibi – backing vocals

== Charts ==
Chart performance for "Say Something"
Chart (2020)	Peak position
Australia Airplay (Radiomonitor)	15
Australia Digital Song Sales (Billboard)	5
Belgium (Ultratip Bubbling Under Flanders)	14
Belgium (Ultratip Bubbling Under Wallonia)	35
Croatia (HRT)	67
Euro Digital Song Sales (Billboard)	17
Hungary (Single Top 40)	15
New Zealand Hot Singles (RMNZ)	40
Scottish Singles Sales (Official Charts)	3
UK Singles (Official Charts)	56
UK Indie (Official Charts)	8
US Dance Airplay (Billboard)	35
US Hot Dance/Electronic Songs (Billboard)	18

== Certifications ==
Region	Certification	Certified units/sales
Brazil (Pro-Música Brasil)	Gold	20,000^{‡}
^{‡} Sales+streaming figures based on certification alone.

== Release history ==
Release dates and formats for "Say Something"
Region	Date	Format(s)	Version	Label(s)	Ref.
Various	23 July 2020	Digital download; streaming	Original	BMG; Darenote	
Various	14 August 2020	Digital download; streaming	Acoustic	BMG; Darenote	
United States	1 September 2020	Dance radio	Original	BMG; S-Curve	
Various	11 September 2020	Digital download; streaming	Syn Cole remix	BMG; Darenote	
Various	30 October 2020	Digital download; streaming	Apple Music at Home Sessions	BMG; Darenote	
Various	6 November 2020	7-inch single	Original; acoustic	BMG; Darenote	
