= I Like =

I Like may refer to:

- "I Like" (Guy song), 1989
- "I Like" (Jeremih song), 2010
- "I Like" (Keri Hilson song), 2009
- "I Like" (Kut Klose song), 1995
- "I Like" (Montell Jordan song), 1996
- "I Like" (Pitbull song), 2012
- "I Like" (Shanice song), 1994
- "I Like (The Trumpet)", a song by DJ Sava and Raluka, 2010
- "I Like (What You're Doing to Me)", a song by Young & Company, 1980
- "I Like", a song by Diddy from The Love Album: Off the Grid, 2023
- "I Like", a song by Katy Rose from Because I Can, 2004
- "I Like", a song by Kojo Funds, 2019
- "I Like", a song by Men Without Hats from Rhythm of Youth, 1982
- "I Like", a song by Young Stoner Life from Slime Language 2, 2021
