= LH2 Studios =

Coordinates: 51°31′27″N 0°16′36″W

LH2 Studios is a purpose-built rehearsal and production space located in Park Royal, West London, United Kingdom, close to Park Royal tube station. The main studio is 1,386sqm (31.5m x 44m) with a height of 18m.

Its primary function is to provide a rehearsal space for musicians, but has also been used in the production of series for The Voice UK (2017), and The X Factor (2017 – 2018).
