= Rosita De La Vega =

Filipina singer

Rosita dela Vega, whose real name was Rosario, was born in 1925 and was known as the Queen of the Philippine Novelty Songs of the 1950s, which was considered the golden era of Philippine recording and airwaves.

== Family ==
Rosita was the daughter of Luis de la Vega and Consuelo Tesoro. In 1948, she married Alberto Barretto da Roza, a Spanish-Portuguese mestizo. Together they have eight children: Ruben T. dela vega, Enrique, Cynthia, Jose Alberto, Manuel Luis, Maria Luisa, Lourdes Rosario, Francisco Antonio and Ana Consuelo. At present, she has 33 grandchildren and 14 great grand children.

== Career ==
Her first experience in singing in front of a big crowd was during her elementary graduation where she sang "O Sole Mio", which was taught to her by her father. She attended Arellano High School under American teachers when her father was transferred to Manila.

During the Japanese occupation in the Philippines, Rosita got her first break with the help of Lou Salvador Sr. who hired her to sing the intermission numbers from the Cine Strand. It was also Salvador who gave Rosita her name, from Rosario. Then she transferred to the production of Joe Generoso at the Life Theater. Here she performed with Katy de la Cruz, Rogelio dela Rosa, Sylvia La Torre, Dolphy, and Chiquito.

After the war, she made rounds of camps to entertain the wounded American soldiers along with other singers that were invited by the United States Service Organization. Then, she joined the post-war night club, starting with El Cairo Nightclub in Sta. Mesa. Here she was accompanied by the orchestra of Mike Velarde, and where she met her husband Alberto da Roza. She also joined the Metro Garden and Grill, also in Sta. Mesa, where she was accompanied by the orchestra of Ben Aristorenas. Also at the Rivera Night Club where she sang before the high society crowd with the Joe Contreras Orchestra.

From 1950 to 1953, Rosita recorded no less than 48 songs under eight recording studios. Her songs made her popular and at the same time controversial.

She was chosen by Raul Manglapus to sing the campaign song of Ramon Magsaysay, claiming that her voice could swing the vote for the candidate, who was known as the man of the masses. Rosita sang her version of the song "Mambo Magsaysay".

Rafael Yabut, who banned her song "I Like It" in his radio program, in time, made amends in his critical attitude towards the singer and invited her to be one of the regular live singers for his Sunday morning program Tayoy'y Mag-aliw, which ran from 1969 to 1975.

== Later years and death ==
Thereafter she chose to devote herself to her family. This time, her focus was on the Catholic Church where she became a lay leader, volunteer an avid cursilista and a member of the charismatic group of Sta. Ana. In 2006, Tribung Pilipino Foundation honored Rosita with an afternoon tribute. The concert was held at the South Seas of Pearl Manila Hotel. In early 2008, she suffered a massive brain hemorrhage. She died on April 7, 2008. Rosita was 83 years old.

== Signature songs ==
Some of her famous songs were adaptations of American songs and also, Levi Celerio, who is now a National Artist, penned most of the local versions of the lyrics.

- Sa Liwanag ng Buwan (1954) (By the Light of the Silvery Moon)
- Kung Ikaw ay Akin (1958) (Oh My Wonderful One)
- Mambo Magsaysay (1953) - the official song for the candidacy of Ramon Magsaysay
- My Love (Since You Went Away)

She also sang:

- Atomic Boogie (1952)
- Ayoko ng nga (1953)
- Basagulera (1954)
- Be Mine Tonight (1952)
- Buhay ko (1956)
- Cadillac-kad (1955)
- Dahan-Dahan (1953)
- Double Crosser (1954)
- I Like It (1949)
- Kung Lumimot ka man (1955)
- Luneta (song) (1954)
- Maladja Pala Pascalata (1952)
- Nakasasabik (1957)
- Night in Manila (1952)
- No Money No Honey (1954)
- Rose, Do You Have Bananas? (1951)
- Sige na (1950)
- Sumasamo ako (1959)
- Ten Thousand Years Ago (1949)
- There is a Tavern in a Town (1950)
- Titina (1952)
