= Magic (Kylie Minogue song) =

2020 single by Kylie Minogue

Single by Kylie Minogue

from the album Disco
- B-side: "Till You Love Somebody"
- Released: 24 September 2020
- Recorded: 2019
- Studio: Metropolis (London, England)
- Genre: Disco-pop
- Length: 3:34 (radio edit); 4:10 (album version)
- Label: Darenote; BMG
- Songwriters: Kylie Minogue; Teemu Brunila; Daniel Davidsen; Peter Wallevik; Michelle Buzz
- Producer: PhD

Kylie Minogue singles chronology
"Say Something" (2020)	"Magic" (2020)	"Real Groove" (2020)

Music video
- "Magic" on YouTube

"Magic" is a song by Australian singer Kylie Minogue. BMG Rights Management and Minogue's company Darenote released it as the second single from her fifteenth studio album Disco (2020) on 24 September 2020, and further distributed on various digital and physical formats on later dates. Minogue, Michelle Buzz, and Teemu Brunila co-wrote the song with producers Daniel Davidsen and Peter Wallevik, collectively known as PhD. Musically, it is a disco-pop song with a variety of instruments, and the lyrics discuss the feeling of falling in love.

Music critics praised "Magic" for its catchiness, production quality, and sound, with some naming it a standout track from the parent album. It was also featured on year-end lists provided by Billboard and CBC Music. Commercially, the song was successful, appearing on record charts in Belgium, Croatia, Hungary, Scotland, Slovakia, and the United Kingdom, as well as component charts in Australia, Finland, New Zealand, and the United States. Furthermore, it is one of Minogue's most streamed singles in the United Kingdom.

British filmmaker Sophie Muller shot the music video for the single at Fabric in Farringdon, London, and it features Minogue and backup dancers in a nightclub with various Visual effects. Minogue promoted the single by performing it on several live television shows, including The Graham Norton Show, The Late Show with Stephen Colbert, and NBC New Year's Eve specials. It was also included in the setlist and live release of her one-time special livestream show, Infinite Disco and the 2025 Tension Tour.

== Writing and development ==
Minogue began working on new music in 2019, after completing the promotion for her fourteenth studio album, Golden (2018), and subsequent tour. During her tour, she was inspired by a segment influenced by the disco aesthetic and Studio 54, and she realised her creative direction would be "heading straight back to the dance floor" with a disco-themed album. However, due to the COVID-19 pandemic and widespread lockdowns, production was halted. During the lockdown, Minogue worked remotely from her London home, experimenting with various software and engineering tools like Logic Pro and GarageBand.

Minogue, Michelle Buzz, and Teemu Brunila co-wrote the song with producers Daniel Davidsen and Peter Wallevik, collectively known as PhD. The track was recorded at Metropolis Studios in London, England, with engineering conducted by Davidson, Wallevik, Alex Robinson, and Duck Blackwell. Johny Saarde, Davidsen, and Wallevik collaborated on drum programming, and the final recording was mastered by Dick Beetham. "Magic" is the album's opening track; Minogue stated that "'Magic' is a kind of Hors d'oeuvre for the album. The main course will be coming in a while—and leave space because there is going to be tiramisu."

== Composition ==
"'Magic' is a kind of hors d'oeuvre for the album. The main course will be coming in a while—and leave space because there is going to be tiramisu. It feels classic, grown-up, and polished, but there’s still an element of surprise with the falsetto notes."

— Minogue talking about the development of "Magic".

"Magic" was released in two versions: a radio edit lasting three minutes and 34 seconds, and an album edit with additional verses lasting four minutes and ten seconds. Musically, "Magic" is a disco song with dance and pop influences. Instruments include horns, "funky" strings, "celebratory" handclaps, and staccato keys. NME editor Nick Levine called it "an exuberant, horn-fuelled romp that deserves to soundtrack a post-Covid roller disco", while Pitchfork writer Katherine St. Asaph noted a "fizzy, sparky chorus".

According to The Guardian writer Ben Neutze, "Magic" and album track "Miss A Thing" have "lush melodies... that conjure up Studio 54 at the end of the 1970s". Junkee editor Joseph Earp compared the overall sound to that of the Bee Gees and Donna Summer, while Medium believed the song set the tone for the album. According to Christina Jaleru of Associated Press, the sound "brings in some hot staccato keys and handclaps on top of a hopeful message". According to Joey Nolfi of Entertainment Weekly, Minogue's vocals are "light-as-a-feather" and the song is a "vintage homage to the groovy glitz and dreamy glamour of 1970s dance floors".

Lyrically, "Magic" is about the experience of falling in love for the first time. In an Apple Music review, Minogue stated, "It is about that magical feeling and the sparks of falling in love, finding a person, the person, the people, however you roll—finding that connection with someone. That does seem like magic sometimes." According to MTV News editor Jackson Langford, Minogue's song convinces the listener that there is solace in every tragedy: "She grabs you by the hand, whether you want to or not, and forces you to breathe in, look at the stars, and dance." Nolfi went on to say that the song's overall vibe was "cheery", and sends a message of hope for a better future.

== Release ==
On 21 September, Minogue announced the release of "Magic" on social media, serving as the second single from Disco. On the same day, she revealed the artwork, which was created by Studio Moross and depicts Minogue in a retro and technicolour close-up. On 24 September, the song debuted as an airplay track, and the single edit was released on digital platforms later that day. The single, album edit, and Minogue's previous single "Say Something" were all available for streaming across multiple platforms.

Throughout October, three remixes of "Magic" were made available on digital platforms: a Purple Disco Machine remix, a Nick Reach Up remix, and an acoustic version featured on Apple Music at Home Sessions. On 6 November, Minogue's webstore released a yellow vinyl of the single with the B-side song "Til' You Love Somebody", which appears on the deluxe editions of Disco. On 5 January 2021, BMG Rights Management released the song to dance radio stations across the United States.

== Critical reception ==
Music critics gave "Magic" positive reviews. Neil Z. Yeung of AllMusic praised the song as a standout track from Disco, describing it as "twinkling". According to The Music editor Guido Farnell, the song "works a charm as it innocently celebrates falling in love on the dancefloor without worrying about what may follow tomorrow". Quentin Harrison of Albumism praised the song's disco influences, writing, "Minogue reaches back to the burgeoning peak of the disco era—circa 1975—to echo the Silver Convention's smash 'Fly, Robin, Fly'." Robin Murray of Clash called it "an effervescent opener, its gentle pulse peeling you away from the raw pessimism of 2020's ongoing dystopia." Idolator writer Mike Wass described the song as "three and a half minutes of pure happiness".

Jeffrey Davis of PopMatters described it as "easily one of the best and gayest songs in her entire discography". According to Matthew Barton of Beats Per Minute, "'Magic' is a solid opener, with its disco-fied, syncopated piano rhythm and its camp tapestry of synths and handclaps", while Attitude described the track as "a slice of pop magic", noting that it "leans more heavily into the funky stylings of the album's genre namesake" than its previous single, "Say Something". Vulture editor Justin Curto thought the song was "lighter fare than shiny lead single 'Say Something' but with a chorus and horn section that still get the job done."

Although Helen Brown of The Independent thought most of the album's material was unoriginal, she described "Magic" as "non-stop fun". Mick Jacobs of Spectrum Culture had mixed feelings about it being released as a single alongside "Say Something", calling it "harmless but charmless". Sal Cinquemani of Slant Magazine criticised the song's delivery, claiming that its lyrics were "generic and vaguely uplifting enough to project onto any personal or global disaster". Nevertheless, "Magic" was ranked 18th on the 25 Best Dance Songs of 2020 by Billboard, as well as the Best Disco Songs of 2020 by CBC Music.

== Commercial performance ==
"Magic" did well commercially, outperforming its predecessor, "Say Something". In Australia, the song peaked at number 20 on the ARIA Artist Singles chart and also reached number 58 on the airplay chart (via Radiomonitor) and number five on Digital Songs chart (via Billboard). In New Zealand, it peaked at number 28 on the Hot Singles chart for one week. In Belgium, it peaked at number 17 on the Bubbling Under chart in Flanders and 19 on the Ultratop chart in Wallonia.

In the United Kingdom, it debuted at number 75 on the UK Singles Chart and rose to number 53. It also reached number two on the Singles Sales chart and eleventh on the Independent Singles chart. It did better in Scotland, reaching number nine on the regional singles chart. It reached number 53 on the Croatian airplay chart and 19 on the Finnish radio chart. In Hungary, the song peaked at number 10 on the Single Top 40 chart. The song also reached number 19 in Serbia (Radiomonitor) and 99 in Slovakia (Radio Top 100).

In the United States, the song reached number 18 on the Hot Dance/Electronic Songs chart and 12 on the Dance/Electronic Digital Songs chart. In Mexico, the song reached number five on the Ingles Chart (via Billboard). In South America, the song reached number 18 on the Uruguay airplay chart (via Monitor Latino). The song also reached number 10 on Euro Digital Songs chart (via Billboard).

== Music video and promotion ==
In an interview with SiriusXM, Minogue revealed that the track's music video was directed by English director Sophie Muller, who had previously shot the video for "Say Something". The video was filmed at Fabric, a nightclub in Farringdon, London, and produced by Chris Murdoch and Juliette Larthe. On 24 September, it premiered on Minogue's official YouTube channel; Minogue is seen dancing in the club with several other dancers and sitting on a throne in a golden jumpsuit. Despite Fabric's closure due to the COVID-19 pandemic, Minogue stated that she wanted "to give fans a moment of escapism to celebrate on a fantasy dance floor".

To further promote the single, Minogue made live appearances on various shows and events. On 6 November 2020, Minogue performed the song on both The Zoe Ball Breakfast Show and The Graham Norton Show. On November 7, she performed the song during her live stream concert Infinite Disco; this version was included in the live releases and DVD of the concert, as well as the repackaged version of Disco: Guest List Edition (2021). She performed the song on The Late Show with Stephen Colbert on 11 November. Minogue performed the song on NBC New Year's Eve specials on 31 December. In 2025, Minogue performed "Magic" on the Tension Tour in a medley with several other songs from Disco.

== Track listing ==
Digital download

1. "Magic" – 4:10

Digital download – single version

1. "Magic" (single version) – 3:34

Streaming bundle

1. "Magic" (single version) – 3:34
2. "Magic" – 4:11
3. "Say Something" – 3:32

7" vinyl

1. "Magic"
2. "Till You Love Somebody"

Purple Disco Machine Remix

1. "Magic" (Purple Disco Machine Remix) – 3:35
2. "Magic" (Purple Disco Machine Extended Mix) – 5:06

Other Official Remixes

- "Magic" (Nick Reach Up Remix) – 3:10
- "Magic" (Nick Reach Up Extended Mix) – 5:36

== Credits and personnel ==
- Kylie Minogue – songwriter, lead vocals, background vocals
- Daniel Davidsen – songwriter, producer, drum programmer, engineer, guitar
- Peter Wallevik – songwriter, producer, drum programmer, engineer, keyboards
- Michelle Buzz – songwriter, background vocals
- Teemu Brunila – songwriter
- Johny Saarde – drum programmer
- Alex Robinson – engineer
- Dick Beetham – engineer

== Charts ==
Chart performance for "Magic"
Chart (2020–2021)	Peak position
Australia Airplay (Radiomonitor)	58
Australia Artist Singles (ARIA)	20
Australia Digital Song Sales (Billboard)	5
Belgium (Ultratip Bubbling Under Flanders)	17
Belgium (Ultratop 50 Wallonia)	19
Croatia (HRT)	53
Euro Digital Song Sales (Billboard)	10
Finnish Airplay (Radiosoittolista)	19
Hungary (Single Top 40)	10
Lithuania Airplay (TopHit)	5
Mexico (Billboard Ingles Airplay)	8
New Zealand Hot Singles (RMNZ)	28
Scotland Singles (Official Charts)	2
Serbia (Radiomonitor)	18
Slovakia Airplay (ČNS IFPI)	99
UK Singles (Official Charts)	53
UK Indie (Official Charts)	7
Uruguay Anglo (Monitor Latino)	18
US Hot Dance/Electronic Songs (Billboard)	17

== Release history ==
Release dates and formats for "Magic"
Region	Date	Format(s)	Version	Label(s)	Ref.
Various	24 September 2020	Digital download; streaming	Original	BMG; Darenote	
Various	9 October 2020	Digital download; streaming	Purple Disco Machine remix	BMG; Darenote	
Various	23 October 2020	Digital download; streaming	Nick Reach Up remix	BMG; Darenote	
Various	30 October 2020	Digital download; streaming	Apple Music at Home Sessions	BMG; Darenote	
Various	6 November 2020	7-inch single	Original	BMG; Darenote	
United States	5 January 2021	Dance radio	Original	BMG	
