= Biffco =

British songwriting team

Background information
- Origin: Brighton, England
- Genres: Pop, dance, electronic
- Occupations: Record producers, songwriters
- Years active: 1993–present
- Members: Richard "Biff" Stannard; Julian Gallagher; Ash Howes

Biffco is a music production and songwriting team from Brighton, England, formed by Richard "Biff" Stannard, Julian Gallagher and Ash Howes. The group have worked with a number of high-profile artists, including Kylie Minogue, One Direction, Atomic Kitten, Ellie Goulding, Leona Lewis, Little Mix, Sophie Ellis-Bextor and Will Young. They are also largely responsible for the rise of the Spice Girls, Five, and East 17. So far, Biffco have had 41 hit singles, including nine number-ones. Stannard and Howes also worked as music directors and show song producers on The X Factor since 2010.

== Members ==
=== Richard "Biff" Stannard ===
Richard Frederick "Biff" Stannard was born on 16 May 1966. His breakthrough in the music industry came with English boyband East 17. Stannard met singer and songwriter Tony Mortimer and introduced him to music manager Tom Watkins, who Stannard was dating at the time. Stannard went on to be the executive producer of East 17's debut album, Walthamstow (1992), and produced two songs for the follow-up album, Steam (1994).

In 2010, he founded the label Major Label with Adam Clough and Paul Smith. Their first signing was English synthpop duo Hurts in 2009.

== Awards and nominations ==
Year	Award	Category	Result
1997	Ivor Novello Awards	Best Selling British Written Single in the UK ("Wannabe")	Won
1997	Ivor Novello Awards	International Hit Of The Year ("Wannabe")	Won
1997	Brit Awards	Best British Producer	Nominated
1998	ASCAP Pop Music Awards	Most Performed Songs in the U.S. ("Wannabe")	Won
1998	ASCAP London Music Awards	Most Performed Songs in the U.S. ("Wannabe")	Won
1998	ASCAP London Music Awards	Most Performed Songs in the U.S. ("2 Become 1")	Won
1998	ASCAP London Music Awards	Song of the Year ("2 Become 1")	Won
1998	Ivor Novello Awards	International Hit Of The Year ("Spice Up Your Life")	Nominated
1999	ASCAP London Music Awards	Most Performed Songs in the U.S. ("2 Become 1")	Won
2014	ASCAP London Music Awards	Song of the Year ("Lights")	Won

== Discography ==
- Alphabeat
  - "Chess"
- Amy Macdonald
  - "Woman of the World" (production only)
- Atomic Kitten
  - "If You Come to Me"
- Claire Richards
  - "Ruins"
- Ellie Goulding
  - "Lights"
  - "Ritual"
- Emma Bunton
  - "Better Be Careful"
  - "High on Love"
  - "So Long"
  - "What Took You So Long?"
- The Feeling
  - "This Promise"
- Francesca Michielin
  - "Arcobaleni"
- Gabrielle
  - "Stay the Same"
  - "When a Woman"
- Five
  - "Closer to Me"
  - "Don't Wanna Let You Go"
  - "Got the Feelin'"
  - "If Ya Gettin' Down"
  - "Keep on Movin'"
  - "Let's Dance"
- Joe McElderry
  - "Feel the Fire"
- Kish Mauve
  - "You Make Me Feel"
- Kylie Minogue
  - "A Second to Midnight"
  - "Attention Seeker"
  - "B.P.M"
  - "Boy"
  - "City Games"
  - "Colour My Life"
  - "Goodbye to Berlin"
  - "Hold on to Now"
  - "I Don't Know What It Is"
  - "I Love It"
  - "In My Arms"
  - "In Your Eyes"
  - "Light Years"
  - "Love Affair"
  - "Love is Here"
  - "Love at First Sight"
  - "Loving Days"
  - "One Last Kiss"
  - "One More Time"
  - "The One"
  - "Please Stay"
  - "Rendezvous at Sunset"
  - "Roller Disco"
  - "Say Something"
  - "Shelby '68"
  - "Shero"
  - "Shoulda Left You"
  - "Somebody to Love"
  - "Stars"
  - "Story"
  - "Tension"
  - "Thing We Do for Love"
  - "Under the Influence of Love" (production only)
  - "Vegas High"
  - "XMAS"
  - "You Still Get Me High"
- Lea Michele
  - "Heavenly"
- Lemar
  - "The Way Love Goes"
- Lena
  - ″Crystal Sky″
  - "Keep On Living"
- Little Boots
  - "Hearts Collide"
  - "No Brakes"
- Little Mix
  - "Change Your Life"
  - "These Four Walls"
- Marina and the Diamonds
  - "Hollywood"
  - "Guilty"
- Matt Cardle
  - "Amazing"
  - "Beat of a Breaking Heart"
  - "Chemical"
  - "Letters"
  - "Sparks"
  - "Starlight"
- Mel B
  - "Lullaby"
  - "Sophisticated Lady"
- Melanie C
  - "In and Out of Love"
  - "Goin' Down"
  - "Living Without You"
  - "Nowhere to Run"
  - "Suddenly Monday"
  - "The Sea"
  - "Rising Sun"
  - "Who I Am"
- One Direction
  - "I Want"
- Pixie Lott
  - "Nobody Does It Better"
  - "Paper Planes"
- The Saturdays
  - "I Can't Wait"
- Sophie Ellis-Bextor
  - "Bittersweet"
  - "Freedom of the Night"
  - "Heartbreak (Make Me a Dancer)"
  - "Love Is You"
  - "New York City Lights"
- Spice Girls
  - "2 Become 1"
  - "Feed Your Love"
  - "Goodbye"
  - "Headlines (Friendship Never Ends)"
  - "If U Can't Dance"
  - "Mama"
  - "Never Give Up on the Good Times"
  - "Saturday Night Divas"
  - "Spice Up Your Life"
  - "Viva Forever"
  - "Voodoo"
  - "Wannabe"
- U2
  - "Elevation"
- Westlife
  - "Don't Let Me Go"
  - "Safe"
  - "When You Come Around"
- Will Young
  - "Cry"
  - "Don't Let Me Down"
  - "Dare"
  - "From Now On"
  - "Grace"
  - "Over You"
  - "Personal Thunder"
  - "Ready or Not"
  - "Side by Side"
  - "Take Control"
  - "You and I"
- 5 Seconds of Summer
  - "18"
