= Passionoia =

Studio album by Black Box Recorder
- Released: 3 March 2003
- Genre: Dance-pop
- Length: 37:51
- Label: One Little Indian
- Producer: Black Box Recorder; Pete Hofmann

Black Box Recorder chronology
The Worst of Black Box Recorder (2001)	Passionoia (2003)

Singles from Passionoia
- 1. "These Are the Things" Released: 24 February 2003; 2. "The School Song" Released: 30 June 2003

Passionoia is the third studio album by British rock band Black Box Recorder. It was released on 3 March 2003 through One Little Indian. Following the promotional cycles for the band's The Facts of Life (2000) and musician Luke Haines' The Oliver Twist Manifesto (2001), they started working on their next album. The band and Pete Hofmann produced the recording sessions; in the midst of this, their label Nude Records went bankrupt. Passionoia is a dance-pop album that was compared to the works of Pet Shop Boys and Saint Etienne, building on the lyrical theme of Britishness that they first explored on their debut album England Made Me (1998).

Passionoia received favourable reviews from critics, with the majority of them praising the music. Positive comments were also made on the songs' lyricism, while others commented on vocalist Sarah Nixey's voice. It reached number 179 on the UK Albums Chart, while "These Are the Things" and "The School Song" peaked at number 91 and 102, respectively, on the UK Singles Chart. The former was released as the album's lead single in February 2003, followed by "The School Song" as the second single from the album in June 2003.

== Background ==
Black Box Recorder released their second studio album The Facts of Life in May 2000 through Nude Records, peaking at number 37 on the UK Albums Chart. Its two singles, "The Facts of Life" and "The Art of Driving", reached number 20 and 53 on the UK Singles Chart, respectively. Before the album was released, musician Luke Haines criticized the label's "artless and crass" promotional campaign for it. Reviewers felt that it might have been more popular if Haines refrained from calling the label "fucking cunts" during an interview. The band went on a four-date tour of the UK, and would appear at the Glastonbury, Reading and Leeds Festivals later in the year. By this stage, with two solo releases in the pipeline, Haines considered retiring from the music industry, before switching focus to the next Black Box Recorder album. Him and bandmate John Moore set about to create an electronic album "with Hank Marvin guitars", though this latter aspect was soon dropped when Haines acquired a piece of equipment that he dubbed the "DJ machine".

In July 2001, around the promotion for his solo album The Oliver Twist Manifesto (2001), Haines planned a week-long boycott against BBC Radio 1, dubbed "Pop Strike". After this concluded, Black Box Recorder started working on their next album, with recording happening sporadically across 2000 and 2001 at a studio in Shoreditch, London. Passionoia was produced by the band members and Pete Hofmann, who also performed engineer and mixing roles. Tim Weller contributed drums to "British Racing Garden", "I Ran All the Way Home" and "Girls Guide for the Modern Diva". During this time, Nude Records would eventually go bankrupt, filing for liquidation by the end of 2001.

== Composition and lyrics ==
=== Overview ===
AllMusic reviewer Andy Kellman said there was "increasingly ornate arrangements" as the band shift their sound to dance-pop, which recalled the work of Pet Shop Boys and Saint Etienne. In a review for Blender, journalist Andrew Harrison wrote that for the band, pop music entails "honeyed synthesizer melodies acting as a Trojan horse" for the lyrics. The Guardian critic Alexis Petridis wrote that the chord progressions were inspired by French chanson music, aided by softly "plucked acoustic guitars, [and] hazy electronics". Idov remarked that the "funniest thing" about the band was that despite "embodying all things British, they end up sounding French", adding that the "blippier numbers seem informed by Air," and chord sequences lifted from the disco-era of Serge Gainsbourg. Harrison thought Nixey "articulates the songs in the persona of a deliciously bored, spoiled and corrupt posh girl", while Maya Singer of Cleveland Scene thought she came across as a "particularly bloodless" iteration of Sarah Cracknell, frontwoman for Saint Etienne.

Haines referred to Passionoia as their "Monkees album. A berserker gone deserter's idea of pop music". Singer said that it expands on a "vein of extreme, almost provincial Britishism" that the band had started with their debut album England Made Me (1998). Pitchfork contributor Michael Idov wrote that the album is a "blunt parody of a 'success is hell' concept album, wherein hilarity stems from the fact that The Facts of Life wasn't that big of a smash". Kellman said Haines and Moore compose with the subjects of "childhood, English culture, and observations of the mundane aspects of adult life" in mind. Harrison said the album had "seedy lyrics about classified-ad dating, teenage lust and the horrors of the British school system". Petridis said the album was "largely concerned with tabloid celebrity" with tracks tackling "manufactured pop bands" and Andrew Ridgeley of Wham!, "who became wildly famous while possessing no discernible talent for anything".

=== Tracks ===
Petridis wrote that with the album's opening track "The School Song", Nixey can be heard "drolly reciting academic cliches", recalling "The Facts of Life". Uncut staff wrote that Nixey assumes the role of a "bitterly authoritarian schoolmaster responsible for emotionally crippling the nation’s youth", while a children's choir can be heard recounting the band's name. Haines said it was a parody of "Tower of Song" (1988) by Leonard Cohen. "GSOH Q.E.D." includes a reference to "I'll Never Fall In Love Again" (1969) by Johnny Mathis. John Walshe of Hot Press compared its exploration of classified adverts to "Classified Personal" (1999) by the 4 of Us, which tackled the same subject with a "reasonably gentle sense of humour, [while] BBR are far more caustic in their approach". Haines said it was intended to be a dating parody; they initially attempted to mix the sounds of Burt Bacharach and Destiny's Child for it, when the final result comes across as Destiny's Child "arranged by the cast of Are You Being Served". The staff at The Independent wrote that "British Racing Green" hints at "how the delusions of empire have now shrunk to bourgeois dreams of country cottages and dinky little sports cars". "Being Number One", which recalls Blur lyrically, talks about the tabloid press revolting against a celebrity. Murphy wrote that "The New Diana" "lac[es] a slab of Destiny's Child-style r'n'b with [Haines'] acidic sense of humour", with Harrison adding that when Nixey speaks of substituting Princess Diana as a "global sweetheart, she leaves the Hilton Sisters for dead in the Ice Queen stakes".

"These Are the Things", which evokes "It's a Sin" (1987) by Pet Shop Boys, is a Eurodisco song that retreads the lyrical theme of "Straight Life" from The Facts of Life. Haines saw it as "Euro-trash" that features him "longing for the apocalypse, which on September 11th [2001] seems to have happened". Playlouder writer Jeres inferred it as discussing the "mundanities of life and how they keep us together". Neumu writer Steve Gozdecki said "Andrew Ridgeley" explores the absurd "triteness of celebrity worship". In the track, which borrows from "Love Action (I Believe in Love)" (1981) by the Human League, Kellman was unsure if Nixey was being "personal or ironic" as she admits her adoration of Ridgeley. He compared it sonically to the work of Saint Etienne, "though lyrical elements that follow make it more like that group's wicked stepsister". Idov felt that Haines parodies his position as their "ventriloquist, having Sarah Nixey intone the lyric, 'This is Sarah Nixey talking.'" during the song. She claimed that Moore wrote the track to intentionally tease her, as he was aware she liked the band when she was younger. Greg Thorpe of No Ripcord said "When Britain Refused to Sing" was a "weird dystopian tale of silence and melancholy". The staff at The Independent wrote that "I Ran All the Way Home" details a girl that is scared by a "bereaved couple who claim she reminds them of how their daughter would have looked, had she lived".

== Release ==
On 26 November 2002, Black Box Recorded announced that they had signed to the label One Little Indian and that Passionoia was announced for release in early 2003. Alongside this, the album's track listing was posted online. Discussing the gap of time since their last release, Nixey explained that it had been finished a year after The Facts of Life had come out, with them attempting to get the album from the liquidators since Nude Records collapsed. Haines noted that during the time away, they stopped receiving press coverage from music publications. Originally planned for 17 February 2003, "These Are the Things" was released as the lead single from the album on 24 February 2003. It featured the tracks "Seventeen and Deadly" and "Land of Our Fathers" as the B-sides.

Passionoia was released on 3 March 2003. The artwork features Nixey, dressed in a bikini, holding a drink as she relaxes by a pool, which has a lifeless body floating in it, who Moore said was their manage Charlie Inskip. Nixey said it was "very Hockneyesque", and intended to be a homage to the art of Roxy Music and Bryan Ferry. Kellman said this was an allusion to a "party gone wrong" that was hosted by Michael Barrymore. Thorpe said it showcases the "concept of BBR exactly; potted palms, poolside tuxedos, empty magnums of champagne and a corpse in the water". "The School Song" was released as the album's second single on 30 June 2003, featuring a remix titled "Passionoia Megamix" and a live version of "Lord Lucan Is Missing" as the B-sides. Sometime later, they embarked on a tour of the United States. Upon returning to the UK, they were informed that One Little Indian was dropping them as the result of an argument between the label and Haines over baggage fees.

Passionoia was included in the career-spanning Life Is Unfair (2018) CD box set alongside the band's other albums. A vinyl edition of this box set was issued the following year.

== Reception ==
Professional ratings
Aggregate scores
Source	Rating
Metacritic	70/100
Review scores
Source	Rating
AllMusic	3.5/5 stars
Blender	3/5 stars
The Guardian	3/5 stars
Neumu	3/10
No Ripchord	6/10
Pitchfork	8.1/10
Playlouder	3/5
Rolling Stone	3/5 stars
Stylus Magazine	7.6/10
Uncut	4/5

Passionoia was met with generally favourable reviews from music critics. At Metacritic, which assigns a normalized rating out of 100 to reviews from mainstream publications, the album received an average score of 70, based on ten reviews, indicating generally favorable reviews.

Most of the reviewers were positive towards the music. Kellman write that it was "full of buoyant arrangements, meaty rhythms, and glitter-specked choruses. It's just as full-bodied and upfront as [England Made Me track] 'Child Psychology' is sparse and distant". Rolling Stone reviewer Rob Sheffield wrote that "too many Brit bands have been getting all sincere on us, with grim results [...] Fortunately, Black Box Recorder are still on the case, making sardonic art pop with juicy melodies and nasty wit". Thorpe said underneath the "neat glitz of Black Box Recorder's delivery Passionoia manages to maintain its baroque underbelly", while Idov said the "arrangements [...] are Haines' usual fare-- deceptively cute, a tad on the lazy side, but always memorable". The Uncut staff wrote that the band's "absinthe-flavoured acid drops give you a great deal more to suck on than the rest of pop’s confectionery selection. Savour their sourness". Killian Murphy of Stylus Magazine thought it was not as a good as The Facts of Life, "but a more than adequate follow-up. Any attempts to find a heart here will prove fruitless, but when the tunes are this good, it would be foolish to resist". Jeres said that "unfortunately a lot of the record falls a wee bit flat [...] Add to that the fact that the music is often a tad on the chilly side and you are no longer laughing along with the joke, but feeling more like an outsider". Walshe similarly said despite the "humour and lyrical dexterity, [the songs] just aren’t interesting enough musically for this listener".

Some critics highlighted Nixey's voice. Murphy proposed the question: "Was there ever a vocal delivery so cold and controlled [than Nixey's]? Certainly not many that spring to mind, but her deliciously empty presence is everywhere on this record". Thorpe said that after hearing Nixey's "ultra-sweet vocals for forty minutes you might just feel like hearing Sepultura for a while (I said might)". The staff at Impact Press noted that her vocals switches from the "cold, in-control voice of a dominatrix, to the whispered beauty of a nymph". CMJ New Music Report writer Antonia Santangelo and Chris Lorraine of Seattle Weekly noticed this too, with the latter adding that Nixey can provide "come-hithers in an icy monotone. But it’s an inviting icy monotone, one that aches with a new vulnerability that helps close the distance between singer and subject".

The majority of writers were also favourable towards the album's lyrics. Kellman thought the band's lyrical "knives haven't dulled in the least", having a "way of making them seem that [mundane], which comes across doubly so," when sung by Nixey. The staff at Uncut wrote that "superficially, [the album] doesn’t seem quite so bleak and mordant as Luke Haines & co’s previous work". Thorpe expanded on this, viewing the album as "something of an evolution too," as Haines' "infamous line[s] in sunny-side-down cynicism having actually flowered into something faintly upbeat and funny". Gozdecki noted that where the band's past releases "effectively lampooned the worst aspects of contemporary British life, the objects of his derision on Passionoia scarcely seem worth deriding". Thorpe thought they often "touch on moments of absolute class", while Singer remarked that unless the listener was an Anglophile, "which the caustic in-jokes on Passionoia only serve to deflate, you'll find quite a lot in the band's music that will pass over the head of the average American listener". Petridis praised the lyrics as they seemed to be "more intelligent and witty than anything you'll hear this year", but was underwhelmed by the album as a whole as the band's "targets seem softer" and the "shock" factor that dominated England Made Me was missing. Harrison called it an "utterly original if slightly queasiness-inducing album", which Walshe added to, saying that "unfortunately the end result is just too clinical and sometimes downright insipid for these ears".

Passionoia charted at number 179 on the UK Albums Chart. On the UK Singles Chart, "These Are the Things" and "The School Song" peaked at number 91 and 102, respectively.

== Track listing ==
All songs written by Luke Haines and John Moore.

1. "The School Song" – 3:41
2. "GSOH Q.E.D." – 3:46
3. "British Racing Green" – 4:34
4. "Being Number One" – 3:26
5. "The New Diana" – 2:49
6. "These Are the Things" – 3:58
7. "Andrew Ridgeley" – 3:47
8. "When Britain Refused to Sing" – 3:14
9. "Girls Guide for the Modern Diva" – 4:09
10. "I Ran All the Way Home" – 4:27

== Personnel ==
Personnel per booklet and sleeve.

Black Box Recorder

- John Moore – instruments
- Sarah Nixey – vocals
- Luke Haines – instruments

Additional musicians

- Tim Weller – drums (tracks 3, 9 and 10)

Production and design

- Black Box Recorder – producer
- Pete Hofmann – producer, mixing, engineer
- Steve Double – photography
- Small Japanese Soldier – design

== Charts ==
Chart performance for Passionoia
Chart (2003)	Peak position
UK Albums (OCC)	179

== See also ==
- Das Capital – Haines' next release after Black Box Recorder
- Sing, Memory – Nixey's next release after Black Box Recorder
