= The Worst of Black Box Recorder =

Compilation album by Black Box Recorder
- Released: 21 August 2001
- Recorded: 1997–2000
- Genre: Indie pop
- Length: 34:04
- Label: Jetset
- Producer: Black Box Recorder & Phil Vinall

Black Box Recorder chronology
The Facts of Life (2000)	The Worst of Black Box Recorder (2001)	Passionoia (2003)

Professional ratings
Review scores
Source	Rating
AllMusic	3.5/5 stars

The Worst of Black Box Recorder is a 2001 album by Black Box Recorder, whose members include Luke Haines, Sarah Nixey and John Moore. It is a compilation of B-sides from the singles of England Made Me and The Facts Of Life.

It also contains videos for 4 of their singles: "The Facts of Life", "Child Psychology", "The Art of Driving" and "England Made Me".

== Track listing ==
1. "Seasons in the Sun" – 2:37
2. "Watch the Angel Not the Wire" – 2:20
3. "Jackie Sixty" – 2:13
4. "Start as You Mean to Go On" – 2:30
5. "The Facts of Life" (Remix by The Chocolate Layers) – 6:24
6. "Lord Lucan is Missing" – 1:49
7. "Wonderful Life" – 2:13
8. "Uptown Top Ranking" (Remix by Black Box Recorder) – 4:09
9. "Brutality" – 2:17
10. "Factory Radio" – 2:11
11. "Soul Boy" – 2:11
12. "Rock 'N' Roll Suicide" – 5:38
13. "The Facts of Life" (Multimedia track) – 2:13
14. "Child Psychology" (Multimedia track) – 4:09
15. "The Art of Driving" (Multimedia track) – 2:17
16. "England Made Me" (Multimedia track) – 2:11

== Cover versions ==
- Track 1 "Seasons in the Sun" - Original by Jacques Brel
- Track 6 "Lord Lucan is Missing" - Original by The Dodgems
- Track 8 "Uptown Top Ranking" - Original by Althea & Donna
- Track 12 "Rock 'n' Roll Suicide" - Original by David Bowie
