= The Facts of Life (album) =

Studio album by Black Box Recorder
- Released: 1 May 2000
- Recorded: 1999
- Genre: New wave; synth-pop; psychedelic-lounge rock
- Length: 44:42
- Label: Nude
- Producer: Black Box Recorder; Pete Hoffman

Black Box Recorder chronology
England Made Me (1998)	The Facts of Life (2000)	The Worst of Black Box Recorder (2001)

Singles from The Facts of Life
- 1. "The Facts of Life" Released: 10 April 2000; 2. "The Art of Driving" Released: 3 July 2000

The Facts of Life is the second studio album by English rock band Black Box Recorder. It was released on 1 May 2000 through Nude Records. Following the release of their debut album England Made Me (1998), the band did not tour to promote it. By early 1999, they were playing two new songs at shows; by June 1999, they were working on a new album. Recording sessions were produced between the band members and Pete Hofmann, continuing through to the end of the year while Luke Haines was occupied with his other act the Auteurs. The Facts of Life is a new wave, synth-pop and psychedelic-lounge rock album that took elements from the works of Momus, Pet Shop Boys and Saint Etienne. Alongside this, the Saint Etienne comparison extended to the lyrical style and frontwoman Sarah Nixey being seen as a counterpoint to that band's Sarah Cracknell.

The Facts of Life was met with favourable reviews from critics, many of whom praised Nixey's voice and the overall quality of the writing, while others commented on the lyrics. It reached number 37 in the United Kingdom and number 52 in Scotland, while "The Facts of Life" and "The Art of Driving" peaked at number 20 and 53, respectively, in the UK. "The Facts of Life" was released as the album's lead single in April 2000, which was promoted with an appearance on Top of the Pops. When the album was released, the band went on a short UK tour, followed by a show in Spain and a performance at Glastonbury Festival. "The Art of Driving" was released as the album's second single in July 2000, being promoted at the Reading and Leeds Festivals the following month.

== Background and writing ==
Black Box Recorder released their debut studio album England Made Me in July 1998 through Chrysalis Records. Its two singles, "Child Psychology" and "England Made Me" reached number 80 and 82, respectively, on the UK Singles Chart. Musician John Moore said the band were dismayed that the album was not viewed as a pop album in the same manner that they thought it was. Frontwoman Sarah Nixey said the label did not understand the band, as they were seen as "their art project". They opted not to tour in order to promote the album, instead only performing at the Reading Festival. Sometime later, they started plotting their second album; during one occasion at a pub, the members shared stories of their first kisses.

Two weeks after swapping tales, Nixey visits Moore's residence in Little Venice, London. Here, bandmates Luke Haines and Moore showed her "May Queen", which she realised was a portrayal of her first kiss story. Nixey said the pair wanted their next album be a hit. She was mixed on this concept, wanting their music to have a wider reach while at the same time retaining anonymity. Nixey mentioned that several of the songs that had been written at this stage were upbeat with sex serving as the prominent theme. Between February and April 1999, Black Box Recorder played shows at The Garage in London, where they debuted two new tracks, namely "The Art of Driving" and "May Queen". Session musician Tim Weller had been drafted in to play drums for these appearances.

== Development and recording ==
In June 1999, NME reported that Black Box Recorder left Chrysalis Records and signed with Nude Records. Saul Galpern, the label's founder, had heard the new material the band made and offered them a recording contract for four albums. Alongside this, the publication mentioned that the band were in the midst of recording their next album; Moore recounted that as it was the start of summer, there was a "breezy atmosphere, which rubbed of on us", viewing themselves as Blondie. Haines explained that they wrote two tracks that could be seen as hits, until they changed their minds, scrapping the songs "and decided to stop being Blondie". Sessions would continue into October 1999, by which time Haines was occupied promoting How I Learned to Love the Bootboys (1999) with his other band the Auteurs.

In addition to this, Black Box Recorder played at the Benicassim Festival in Spain, Reading and Leeds Festivals and CMJ Music Marathon in the United States. The Facts of Life was produced by the band and Pete Hoffman, who also handled engineer and mixing duties. Additional drums were provided by Weller on "The Facts of Life", "Straight Life" and "The Deverell Twins", and by Chris Wyles on "The English Motorway System" and "May Queen". Upon hearing that "The Facts of Life" was to be the album's first single, Haines was adamant about having Pete Craigie mixing it, with the latter having recently worked on "Honey to the Bee" (1999) by Billie. The band visit Craigie at his studio, where at Nixey's description, he "saturate[s] our perfect pop song with tons of whoosy-swooshy sounds," most of which were subsequently left out of the mix.

== Music and themes ==
Barry Walters of Spin said the album's title conveys a "candor both straightforward and savagely ironic, born of hard-knock memories too clear to romanticize". The album shifts its lyrical focus to transportation, as heard in "The Art of Driving" and "The English Motorway System", moving away from the end-of-the-world narrative of their debut. Alongside this, Sonicnet's Tony Fletcher said the album "primarily conjures rural imagery — though its talk of nature walks and open fields, coming at a time when the English countryside is closed off to prevent the spread of foot-and-mouth disease, makes for a curiously nostalgic effect". AllMusic reviewer Dean Carlson said the band move away from the "voyeuristic, cynical stare" of England Made Me towards "suicide and car crashes and focused it on small-town dating and disenchanted sex lives". Discussing the latter part, Moore said the manner that the album handles "sexuality is certainly in that sex is a slightly kind of seedy end-product of emotional entanglement".

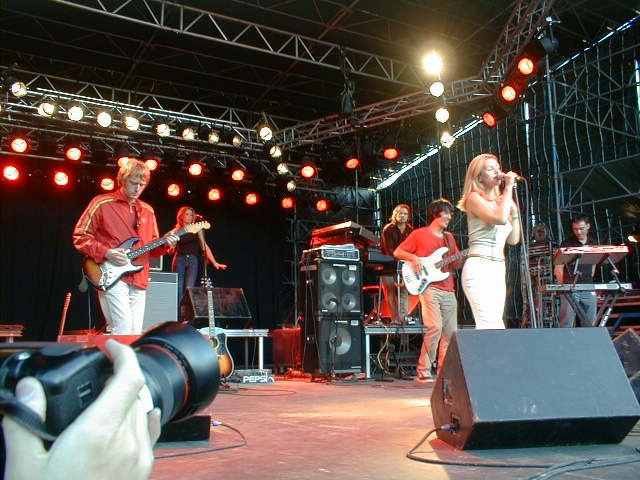
Comparisons were made to Saint Etienne from the lyrical style and music to Nixey coming across as a counterpart to that band's frontwoman Sarah Cracknell.

The staff at Orlando Weekly wrote that it was "even more sinister beauty [than their debut], focusing their collective furrowed brow on British indifference and pedestrian society"; Neate remarked that the members' "sensibility and attitude remain unmistakably English, its songs steeped in a tradition of comfortably ironic, darkly humorous, self-mocking misery". He noted a comparison to Saint Etienne on some of the album's tracks, with "Weekend" featuring "precisely the kind of cultural coordinates" that they would do and "The English Motorway" using the travel system its named after as an allegory for a collapsing relationship as Saint Etienne had with "Like a Motorway" (1994). Ian Davies of Dotmusic extended this, saying that Saint Etienne-like lyricism is heard throughout The Facts of Life. Exclaim!'s Cam Lindsay felt that the "seductive whispers" of the lyrics evoked the style of Jarvis Cocker from Pulp.

Musically, the sound of The Facts of Life has been described as new wave and synth-pop, with elements from the works of Momus, Pet Shop Boys, Pink Floyd, Portishead and Saint Etienne. Kiran Aditham of Ink 19 called the album psychedelic-lounge rock, attributing the sound to one of band members who was a "major Absinthe importer". He added that it was "distant cousins" to the work of Air and Belle and Sebastian, "utiliz[ing] their relaxed songwriting nature to near-perfectly compliment the haunting vocals" of Nixey. NME's Jim Alexander wrote that the music was "rigged with soulful flourishes, the tinkle of glockenspiel, gently-looped R&B; beats," mixing the direction of Air and Pulp to create "satin smooth subliminal pop". Lindsay extended the Pulp comparison to their album This Is Hardcore (1998), and also linked similarity to Serge Gainsbourg.

Pitchfork contributor Rich Juzwiak said that "this time out, the bare-bones approach is more lush and rich, paradoxically proving that 'minimal' does not necessarily have to mean 'sparse.'" He went on to say Nixey's "delicate, melismatic approach" to her vocals earned her a comparison to Olivia Newton-John. Wilson Neate of PopMatters saw Nixey as the "evil twin" of Sarah Cracknell from Saint Etienne, and while Nixey's parts are frequently "breathy and honey-coated, she's also capable of the aloof iciness of Nico, frequently combining the two registers within the same song to sublime effect".

== Tracks ==
Walters wrote that the album's opening track, "The Art of Driving", swaps an "elaborate motoring metaphor for seduction, a boy's foot heavy on the accelerator, [and] a girl warning him to put on the brakes". The A.V. Club writer Keith Phipps said Nixey and Moore can be heard "trading thin, automobile-centered double entendres like a modern-day" iteration of Gainsbourg and his partner Jane Birkin, and went to say that the "borderline-kitschy synthesized strings" and "la la las" backing vocals had a Gainsbourg-esque "touch [to them] as well, using the common language of pop music to sneak in a subversive notion or two". Juzwiak said it is a "sweeping number" that features an echo-enhanced "beat, sodden bass, and lightly strummed guitar to create a pillow of sound". "Weekend" is a John Barry-esque track, which includes a reference to Saturday Night and Sunday Morning (1958) by Alan Sillitoe during its chorus section. "The English Motorway System" uses the road network of the same name as a metaphor for a deteriorating relationship. Author Guy Mankowski wrote in Albion's Secret History – Snapshots of England's Pop Rebels and Outsiders (2021) that in the song, Haines' "psyche had been warped by urban living", akin to a J. G. Ballard-like figure.

"May Queen", which was compared to the work of Belle and Sebastian, is an electroacoustic song that takes elements from 1950s sci-fi and progressive rock. The track discusses two children having their first kiss on a school playground, which Alexander said "dissolv[es] in imagined blood". With "Sex Life", Nixey sings provocative lyrics that eventually switch girl for boy, in a manner that recalled "Girls & Boys" by Blur (1994). "French Rock'n'Roll" discusses a woman being saved from suicide by the effect of music; Juzwiak said the track's chorus section was accompanied by a guitar part that "intensifies the canned drums and xylophone twinkling". The song's "la la la" chorus section evoked "Je t'aime... moi non plus" (1967) by Birkin. "The Facts of Life" has a reggae-like beat, while its melody was reminiscent of the one in "Thank You" (2000) by Dido. Nixey sings in staccato form, bordering on rapping, as she assumes the role of a health teacher. Overall, it evoked "Never Ever" (1997) by All Saints and "Honey to the Bee" (1999) by Billie; Carlson said the song came across as a "Stanley Kubrick-directed All Saints production. Simple, gorgeous, chart-friendly, and just plain evil".

The title of "Straight Life" is a reference to "Street Life" (1973) by Roxy Music. Alexander wrote that it "celebrates happily-married, DIY-enthusiast normality", with Juzwiak adding that it has a "perfect midtempo, subdued electro beat" that is buried in the recording. "Gift Horse" discusses murderer John Christie, who was later hanged, and a body being located in a garden in the Notting Hill of London. Mark Edwards of The Times wrote that the hunt for evidence is juxtaposed with Nixey exclaiming "I just want to be loved" during the chorus section. "The Deverell Twins" talks about two boys from the 1880s, who died by drowning in the River Thames. Haines mentioned that it evolved into a "psycho-geographical song [...] the idea of redefining a place in terms of what's gone on there". In a review for Q, journalist Stuart Maconie said in "Goodnight Kiss", the album's closing track, the "end of an evening is expanded into a valediction for England", with references to locations such as the Blackpool Tower, Severn Bridge and Southend-on-Sea. Rock critic Robert Christgau said the two bonus tracks, "Start as You Mean to Go On" and "Brutality", "would fit better" on England Made Me. With "Brutality", Freaky Trigger contributor Robin Carmody said Nixey sounds clearly "disgusted by what she's chronicling, she can't be part of it, she looks back at its historical association with her own social class and background with deep contempt".

== Release ==
Preceded by a one-off show in London, "The Facts of Life" was released as the lead single from The Facts of Life on 10 April 2000. Two versions were released on CD: the first with a radio edit of "The Facts of Life", "Soul Boy" and "Start as You Mean to Go On" and the second with "Brutality" and "Watch the Angel, Not the Wire". The music video for "The Facts of Life", directed by Lindy Heymann, takes place in a classroom with Nixey as the teacher, which is interspersed with shots of two students getting ready for school. On 19 April 2000, Haines criticized Nude Records' "artless and crass" promotional campaign for the album, branding them "fucking cunts" during an interview. A representative from the label was confused by Haines' words, explaining that Nude have a "good relationship with the band and the manager". Two days after this incident, the band appeared on Top of the Pops. The Facts of Life was released on 1 May 2000 through Nude Records, which was promoted with a short, four-date tour of the UK in the middle of the month. In June 2000, the band played a one-off show in Seville, Spain in the lead up to a performance at Glastonbury Festival.

"The Art of Driving" was released as the second single from The Facts of Life on 3 July 2000. The song's music video, directed by Perou, stars members of the band as crash test dummies driving a car against a white void. Animations of 3D models of people and mathematical figures are seen throughout. Two versions were issued on CD: the first with a radio edit of "The Art of Driving", a remix of "The Facts of Life" and a cover of "Rock 'n' Roll Suicide" (1974) by David Bowie, and the second with a remix of the England Made Me track "Uptown Top Ranking" and the radio edit and music video of "The Facts of Life". The Bowie cover, which was one of Nixey's favourites songs by Bowie, was taken from an Evening Session the band did for BBC Radio 1. Nixey said "The Facts of Life" remix was done by Cocker and his bandmate Steve Mackey; it takes samples from 1970s pornographic films. It came about from a meeting between Haines and Cocker a party when Cocker asked him for a cigarette to which Haines replied "yeah, if you remix our single". The following month, the band performed at the Reading and Leeds Festivals. The Facts of Life was released in the United States on 20 March 2001 through Jetset Records with the addition of "Start as You Mean to Go on" and "Brutality".

"Watch the Angel, Not the Wire", "Start as You Mean to Go On", "Brutality", "Soul Boy", the Bowie cover, the remixes of "The Facts of Life" and "Uptown Top Ranking" and the music videos for "The Art of Driving" and "The Facts of Life" were included on the compilation album The Worst of Black Box Recorder (2001). The Facts of Life was included in the career-spanning Life Is Unfair (2018) CD box set alongside the band's other albums. A vinyl edition of this box set was issued the following year.

== Reception ==
Professional ratings
Aggregate scores
Source	Rating
Metacritic	82/100
Review scores
Source	Rating
AllMusic	4.5/5 stars
Consumer Guide	A
Entertainment Weekly	B+
The Guardian	4/5 stars
NME	8/10
Pitchfork	7.3/10
Q	4/5 stars
Rolling Stone	3.5/5 stars
The New Rolling Stone Album Guide	4.5/5 stars
Spin	8/10

The Facts of Life was met with general acclaim from music critics. At Metacritic, which assigns a normalized rating out of 100 to reviews from mainstream publications, the album received an average score of 82, based on 16 reviews, indicating universal acclaim.

Reviewers were generally positive on the album's quality. Entertainment Weekly writer Rob Brunner wrote that it was "perfect driving music, be it on the English motorway system or elsewhere". Carlson noted that keeping with their debut, The Facts of Life had "barren instrumentation [...] but this time around, there seems to be a pop sensibility that evokes far more seditious strengths than ever before", which offered a "delightfully sinister contradiction". The Guardian critic Caroline Sullivan remarked that when aided by Nixey, Haines "perfected the art of the deceptively tranquil pop song" as there was "always more going on under the surface than you expect". Alexander said the "shocking news is that Black Box Recorder seem to have cheered up a little", adding that the music made "several leaps since the spectral atmospherics of their debut". Juzwiak that it was "more finely crafted" than their debut, despite it sharing the same minimalistic tone as that release. Maconie wrote that while "there's still many penumbral moments on The Facts Of Life, happily [the band] blossomed into a real pop group - albeit of a very skewed sort".

A few of the critics commented on the album's lyrics. Brunner said "not many bands could make chilly lines [...] sound mysterious and alluring, but Recorder's beautiful, strange tunes do exactly that". Carlson said the album was a "precise, meticulous, deeply disturbing experience. [...] Subversion has rarely sounded this startling". Juzwiak felt that the band remained a "bit dopey when it comes to lyrics", though does not blame Nixey as "she's merely a mouthpiece" for Haines. Neate said the band might seem like they are commenting on the modern "socio-cultural landscape, but what they're doing is absolutely symptomatic of it". Bob Gulla of Wall of Sound praised Haines for something that "few writers can pull off such [as] a sharp, smart sense of sarcasm and still keep listeners enthralled". Lindsay took pride in analysing the album's lyrics, mentioning that "like their debut album, this is sick and twisted, but what else would you expect from the leader of the Auteurs - a man that once wrote an album about the joys of terrorism".

Several reviewers praised Nixey's voice. Rolling Stone reviewer Rob Sheffield said Nixey's "velvet vocals are the centerpiece of the music, making the melodies soar over" the guitar and keyboard instrumentation. musicOMH contributor Michael Hubbard said her vocals were "seductive throughout, luring the listener to believe everything she says". Carlson said Nixey conveys "impassioned distance that serves up the disparagement nicely", while Christgau remarked that he heard Nixey's "careful tone and caring words and find kindness there". Alexander wrote that Nixey sounds "as if the daily Stepford wife dose of gin and Valium holds little relief". Juzwiak thought that Nixey continued to be "faulty in her cleverness and smugness", mentioning that "when she's not merely speaking and opens her pipes to really sing, she proves herself a righteous puppet". Phipps said there was "something everyday and evil in the way" Nixey can make some of the lyrics "sound, even if you have to listen to hear it in the midst of this lovely poison-candybox of an album". Neate added to this, saying that Nixey's "beautiful vocal melodies are generally at complete odds with the content of the lyrics, which is at times harrowing".

In the UK, The Facts of Life peaked at number 37 on the UK Albums Chart and number four on the UK Independent Albums Chart, while in Scotland, it reached number 52. "The Facts of Life" and "The Art of Driving" appeared on the UK Singles Chart at number 20 and 53, respectively.

== Track listing ==
All songs written by Luke Haines and John Moore.

1. "The Art of Driving" – 4:25
2. "Weekend" – 2:27
3. "The English Motorway System" – 4:40
4. "May Queen" – 3:39
5. "Sex Life" – 2:56
6. "French Rock'N'Roll" – 3:01
7. "The Facts of Life" – 4:37
8. "Straight Life" – 4:09
9. "Gift Horse" – 3:30
10. "The Deverell Twins" – 2:43
11. "Goodnight Kiss" – 3:45

US bonus tracks

12. "Start as You Mean to Go On" – 2:30
13. "Brutality" – 2:19

== Personnel ==
Personnel per back cover.

Black Box Recorder

- John Moore – instruments
- Sarah Nixey – vocals
- Luke Haines – instruments

Additional musicians

- Tim Weller – additional drums (tracks 7, 8 and 10)
- Chris Wyles – additional drums (tracks 3 and 4)

Production and design

- Black Box Recorder – producer
- Pete Hoffman – producer, engineer, mixing
- AP;D – art direction, design
- Alasdair McLellan – model photography
- Perou – band photography

== Charts ==
Chart performance for The Facts of Life
Chart (2000)	Peak position
Scottish Albums (OCC)	52
UK Albums (OCC)	37
UK Independent Albums (OCC)	4
