= Marcia Aitken =

- Born: c. 1956; Hannah Town, Kingston, Jamaica
- Genres: Lovers rock, gospel reggae
- Instrument: Vocals
- Years active: 1975–1981, 2014–present
- Label: Joe Gibbs

Marcia Aitken (born c. 1956, Hannah Town, West Kingston, Jamaica) is a Jamaican reggae singer best known for her recordings in the late 1970s, produced by Joe Gibbs along with Errol Thompson.

== Biography ==
Aitken's break into the music industry came while she was still a student at Excelsior High School - in her own words: "I was singing at a school concert, and Lloyd Parks and the We the People Band was backing us. They said they liked the sound of my voice, and I became a member of the band after that. Then I began to do recordings for Joe Gibbs". She concentrated on lovers rock and recorded a popular version of the Alton Ellis song "I'm Still in Love With You" (as "I'm Still in Love with You Boy", recorded while still at Excelsior), which was a number one hit in Jamaica and successful UK and US reggae charts, and also formed the basis of Trinity's "Three Piece Suit" and Althea & Donna's "Uptown Top Ranking". She had another Jamaican number one single in 1978 with "My Man", a combination record with Trinity. She also recorded songs by Ansel Cridland of The Meditations, including "Narrow Minded Man", a response to The Meditations' chauvinistic "Woman is Like a Shadow". Aitken recorded a single album, Reggae Impact, produced by Gibbs and Willie Lindo.

After completing high school in 1981, Aitken retired from music and moved to Brooklyn, where she opened the Norstrand Eatery with her husband in 1985. In the 2000s she studied for a degree in business management. She subsequently moved into nursing for over twenty years.

Aitken returned to recording with the 2014 album Conception to Redemption, which featured gospel versions of some of her earlier songs.

== Discography ==
=== Albums ===
- Reggae Impact (1981) Joe Gibbs
- Conception to Redemption (2014)

=== Singles ===
- "Narrow Minded Man" (1975) Belmont
- "I'm Still in Love with You Boy" (1977) Belmont JA #1
- "Blouse and Skirt" (with Trinity)
- "My Man" (1978) (with Trinity) JA #1
- "Closer I Get to You" (1979) Joe Gibbs (with Ruddy Thomas)
- "Danger in Your Eyes" (1979) Joe Gibbs
