= Anthony Benedict Thompson =

British singer

Tony Thompson
- Genres: Electronic; pop; R&B
- Occupation: Musician
- Instruments: Vocals; saxophone
- Formerly of: Phats & Small; Benz

Anthony Benedict Thompson, known professionally as Tony Thompson and Darkboy, is a British singer. He sang in Benz, who had two UK top 40 singles, sang on Phats & Small's second album This Time Around, including on "Change", which charted at No. 45 on the UK Singles Chart, and Four Story, who partook in Making Your Mind Up.

== Career ==
Anthony Benedict Thompson joined Benz in 1993; his nickname in the band was Darkboy, and the other members were Tim Shade (Benjamin Balogun) and B.I.G. Ben (Benedict Ofoedu). He and Balogun were old friends, and Balogun invited him to join after seeing him walking down the street. Their first single was "Boom Rock Soul", a term used by Benz to describe their music; they used a December 1995 issue of Echoes to explain that Balogun contributed the "boom", or "the deep hip hop, the hard bass", while Ofoedu contributed the "rock", and Thompson contributed the "soul". "Boom Rock Soul" charted at No. 62; subsequent singles "Urban City Girl", "Miss Parker", "If I Remember", and "On a Sun-Day" charted at numbers 31, 35, 59 and 73, respectively.

In 1999, Thompson and Ofoedu provided vocals for Phats & Small's "Turn Around", "Feel Good", and "Tonite"; which charted at numbers 2, 7 and 11 on the UK Singles Chart, respectively. He was promoted to main vocalist for their second album, This Time Around; the song's title track charted at No. 15 on the UK Singles Chart, and Thompson lip-synched to it on Top of the Pops. He also sang on the track "Change", which charted at No. 45 on the UK Singles Chart. In late 2003, Thompson joined Four Story, a band formed by Ofoedu, Mark Brightman, and Rodney Williams, who had previously been in REDhill with Shane Lynch; they took part in Making Your Mind Up, with the intention of representing the United Kingdom at the Eurovision Song Contest. They came fifth. Thompson, Ofoedu and Phats & Small reunited for an appearance on stage in the 2015 NYE MarbsFest at the Brentwood Centre; he used a 2015 appearance on Phoenix FM that month to advertise the event to note that he had started his own fitness, nutrition and athletics company, and that he was an ex-cage fighter.
