= Ben Ofoedu =

- Born: Benedict Spencer Ofoedu; British Hong Kong
- Occupation: Musician
- Years active: 1989–present
- Member of: Intenso Project
- Formerly of: Boyz on Block; Phats & Small; Benz; First Impact

Benedict Spencer Ofoedu (/oʊfeɪduː/) is a British singer-songwriter. He is best known for being the former fiancé of Vanessa Feltz and for his media appearances arising from this – although he had some success as a vocalist, having sung on ten UK Singles Chart entries as part of Benz, Phats & Small, and Intenso Project; a solo single, "Your Love", charted at No. 76 on the same chart.

== Life and career ==
=== Music career ===
Benedict Spencer Ofoedu (/oʊfeɪduː/) was born in Hong Kong and moved to the United Kingdom with his family when he was two years old. His parents were Igbo; his father was a merchant seaman. In 1989, Ofoedu featured on the tracks "Don't Stop" and "The Deep", from Humanoid's Global. He then formed Big Ben & The Fox. In 1993, Ofoedu joined the band Benz under the name B.I.G. Ben, along with Tim Shade (Benjamin Balogun), and Darkboy (Anthony Benedict Thompson); The group had five singles enter the UK Singles Chart; "Boom Rock Soul" (No. 62), "Urban City Girl" (No. 31), "Miss Parker" (No. 35), "If I Remember" (No. 59), and "On A Sun-Day" (No. 73).

In 1999 he became the singer of Phats & Small after they found they needed a frontman for their hit single Turn Around, which peaked at No. 2 on the UK Singles Chart. Ofoedu would later sing on their singles "Feel Good" and "Tonite", which charted at No. 7 and No. 11 on the UK Singles Chart. In 2000, he released a solo single "Your Love" under the name "Ben", which charted at No. 76 on that chart. In 2001, he joined REDhill, whose other members were Mark Brightman, Rodney Williams, and Shane Lynch; they were never signed, and disbanded in 2002. Ofoedu, Brightman, Williams, and Tony Thompson would later form Four Story in late 2003, who with "Hand on My Heart" appeared on Making Your Mind Up with the intention of representing the United Kingdom at the Eurovision Song Contest; they came fifth.

In 2002, he joined Intenso Project, which peaked at No. 22, No. 32, and No. 23 on the UK Singles Chart with "Luv Da Sunshine", "Your Music" featuring Laura Jaye, and "Get It On" featuring Lisa Scott-Lee. In 2008, he wrote Chanelle Hayes' "I Want It". On 11 March 2017, he appeared as one fifth of Boys Allowed, a parody of Girls Aloud, on Let's Sing and Dance. On 13 April 2018, he featured on the Power of Muzik's "Bruised", a charity single which raised money for Barnardo's and which also featured All Together Now winner Michael Rice, Asher Knight, Angels N Bandits, and Luena Martinez, who would later win The X Factor: The Band as part of RLY. In 2019, he co-founded the boy band pop supergroup Boyz on Block.

=== Television career ===
Ofoedu has appeared on Never Mind the Buzzcocks four times; as a panellist he appeared on 14 October 1999 and 4 October 2004, and as one of the Identity Parade he appeared on 17 November 2014 and 12 October 2021. On 22 September 2006, Ofoedu performed magic tricks on The All Star Talent Show, where he came fifth. On 29 March 2015, Ofoedu appeared on the BBC's The Big Questions, where the big question in question was "Do you need to be born again to be a Christian?". On 29 November 2015, he appeared on Fern Britton Meets..., and in September 2022, Ofoedu appeared on Pointless Celebrities.

In April 2007, he and his then-fiancée Vanessa Feltz turned up on an episode of Channel 4's Celebrity Wife Swap, in which she spent a week with Paul Daniels, and Ofoedu spent a week with Debbie McGee. On 22 September 2007, Feltz and Ofoedu won £150,000 on Who Wants To Be a Millionaire. Between 10 January and 24 June 2011, Ofoedu and Feltz co-hosted Channel 5's The Vanessa Show. In July 2011, the pair appeared on Pointless Celebrities, reaching the final, but failing to win the jackpot for their charity; they appeared again in February 2019, winning £2,500. They also appeared on All Star Mr & Mrs in July 2014, and on Celebrity Big Brother's "Bit On the Side" as panel members on 1 September 2014.

== Personal life ==
Ofoedu is a born-again Christian; his nickname in Benz, B.I.G. Ben, was short for Believe In God Ben. He was engaged to television and radio presenter Vanessa Feltz between 2006 and 2023; the pair did not marry due to Feltz's previous bad experiences with marriage (her previous husband had cheated on her), and they split up due to Ofoedu also cheating on her. Ofoedu married in July 2025.
