= Sing, Memory =

Studio album by Sarah Nixey
- Released: 19 February 2007
- Recorded: London; 2005–2006
- Genre: Electropop; dance-pop; downtempo
- Length: 55:34
- Label: ServiceAV
- Producer: James Banbury

Sarah Nixey chronology
Sing, Memory (2007)	Brave Tin Soldiers (2011)

Sing, Memory is the debut album from British Black Box Recorder vocalist, Sarah Nixey. Recorded in London, and produced by James Banbury, the album is split into two halves, Sing and Memory. The title is probably a reference to Vladimir Nabokov's autobiography, Speak, Memory. It was released in the UK on 19 February 2007.

The album includes the five singles: "The Collector", "Love & Exile", "Strangelove", "When I'm Here With You" and "The Black Hit Of Space". The first two were released as a double-A side exclusive download in mid-2006. "Strangelove" was released on 7" vinyl and CD, backed by remixes of "The Collector". "When I'm Here With You" also preceded the album on 29 January 2007. "The Black Hit of Space", released on 9 July 2007, is a cover version of The Human League's track from their Travelogue album (1980).

== Composition ==
AllMusic reviewer K. Ross Hoffman wrote that Sing, Memory expands on the "extroverted electronic pop trajectory" of Passionoia, "emerging as a full-fledged collection of stylish 21st century dance-pop" styled after Dot Allison, Goldfrapp and Róisín Murphy. He mentioned that the album was split between "dancefloor-ready" songs, such as "Beautiful Oblivion" and "Strangelove (Sing Version)", and downtempo tracks influenced by trip hop, like "When I'm Here with You" and "Masquerade". NME writer Laura Snapes said the first half "shimmers with complete confidence," taking elements from Björk, specifically Debut (1993), and Ladytron. musicOMH's Jenni Cole said the album draws in listeners with its 1980s "electro surface into the same dark and murky waters" explored by Echo & the Bunnymen and Orchestral Manoeuvres in the Dark; she also gave comparisons to British Electric Foundation and Saint Etienne. Drowned in Sound writer Holliy noted that it melded "electronic atmospherics, complexity and sophistication, tempered with an ear for a tune and a casual manipulation of the polish and clarity of pop to create a tangible feeling of otherworldliness". Hoffman said that Nixey shows "herself to be a good deal more romantic and empathetic" lyrically than Haines and Moore, though sharing a "similar preoccupation with the dark, twisted aspects of human relationships" as them.

The album opens with the spoken word track "Sing (Prelude)"; Cole says Nixey describes that there is "two sides to everything: some songs are true and others are lies". Pitchfork contributor Joe Tangari said Nixey "goes on to talk about the record you're about to hear". Bookended by the electro of "When I'm Here with You" and the disco song "Strangelove (Sing Version)", "Beautiful Oblivion" includes the lyrical style of Black Box Recorder of a neo-disco groove in the vein of Annie. Tangari said "Hotel Room" incorporated pentatonic guitar parts that "only hobble the song and relying on a chorus that collapses under its would-be anthemic weight". The funk-esque "Nothing on Earth" recalled the later material of Kylie Minogue. "Nightshift" is a cover of the 1981 track of the same name by the Names; Cole compared it to "Child Psychology" (1998) by Black Box Recorder, "a song as fragile and beautiful as it is disturbing". "Memory (Prelude)", another spoken word song, serves as an intro to "The Collector", which Tangari was a re-working of the 1963 book of the same name by John Fowles. He mentioned that "Endless Circles" tries to "create an affirmation for re-starting your life that bogs down in a sung-spoke pre-chorus". The album ends with a cover of the Human League track "The Black Hit of Space" (1980).

== Reception ==
Professional ratings
Review scores
Source	Rating
AllMusic	4/5 stars
Drowned in Sound	8/10
musicOMH	4/5 stars
NME	7/10
Pitchfork	6.3/10
The Skinny	3/5 stars

Critics praised the album's songwriting and sound direction. Hoffman said Nixey "never let setting the right mood interfere with a good hook or a groove -- in any event, the album is both impossibly glamorous and immensely pleasurable to listen to". Cole wrote that it was "good to see that she can cut the mustard without Haines’ idiosyncratic (read: disturbingly bonkers) lyrics to back her up" as the album acts as the "perfect soundtrack for when the curtains are drawn and the sheets are made of black satin". Holliy mentioned that she was bordering on "calling these songs catchy – but [...] that’s not quite right. What they actually do is haunt you: play on your mind, get under your skin, and itch away at the back of your consciousness". Tangari wrote that Nixey by herself "seems more concerned with making a genuine pop record than needling English society" as heard with her work with Haines previously. Neil Ferguson of The Skinny added that the "sound is thick at times, [as] too often Sing, Memory feels sparse and exiguous, and as the electro-cabaret grows towards the close it all begins to feel just a little formulaic".

Several reviewers also praised Nixey's voice. Holliy highlighted the "strong, clear vocals [as they] carry the weight of the tune and focus the emotions hinted at by the pop electronics". Snapes said the tracks are "made all the more affecting by the crisp English accent that defined Sarah in her Black Box Recorder days. This unerringly self-assured record proves that she’s much better off on her own". Ferguson exclaimed that Nixey was the Nancy Sinatra for the 21st century" with "sultry, quixotic pop-music with breathed, laboured vocals". Tangari praised her "thick accent, the deadpan delivery, the fortitude in the face of senselessness; it's all there whenever she opens her mouth to sing, and that poise works in her favor on the most upbeat material here". Hoffman wrote that being aware that Nixey was fronting "these lovelorn tales helps to take the edge out of her stiffly proper English enunciation, and in conjunction with a less chilly delivery [...] makes Sing, Memory far more likely to melt your heart than leave it shivering".

== Track listing ==
1. "Sing (Prelude)" (Sarah Nixey, James Banbury, Paul Morley)
2. "When I'm Here With You" (Nixey, Paul Statham)
3. "Beautiful Oblivion" (Nixey, Banbury)
4. "Strangelove (Sing Version)" (Nixey, Banbury, Mark Lodge, Pete Hofmann)
5. "Hotel Room" (Nixey, Banbury, Morley)
6. "Nothing on Earth" (Hannah Robinson, Morley)
7. "Nightshift" (Michel Smordynia)
8. "Memory (Prelude)" (Nixey, Banbury, Morley)
9. "The Collector" (Nixey, Banbury)
10. "Breathe In, Fade Out" (Nixey, Banbury)
11. "Endless Circles" (Nixey, Statham)
12. "The Man I Knew" (Nixey, Banbury)
13. "Masquerade" (Nixey, Banbury)
14. "Love and Exile" (Nixey, Banbury)
15. "The Black Hit of Space" (Ian Craig Marsh, Martyn Ware, Philip Adrian Wright, Philip Oakley)

== Personnel ==
- Sarah Nixey - vocals
- James Banbury - keyboards, programming
- Tim Weller - drums
