= Benz (group) =

Band from Hackney containing Bens

- Origin: Hackney, London, England
- Genres: R&B, hip hop
- Years active: 1993–1997
- Labels: RCA Records; Hendricks Records
- Past members: Big Ben; Tim Shade; Darkboy

Benz were a British musical group from Hackney which consisted of B.I.G. Ben (Benedict Spencer Ofoedu), Tim Shade (Benjamin Balogun), and Darkboy (Anthony Benedict Thompson). Their name came about due to all their names containing Ben. They entered the UK Singles Chart with "Boom Rock Soul" (No. 62), "Urban City Girl" (No. 31), "Miss Parker" (No. 35), "If I Remember" (No. 59), and "On a Sun-Day" (No. 73).

== Career ==
The group was formed by B.I.G. Ben (Benedict Spencer Ofoedu), Tim Shade (Benjamin Balogun), and Darkboy (Anthony Benedict Thompson). They formed after Ofoedu saw Balogun performing as Overlord X, liked what he saw, and invited him to produce a track for him; after Balogun became tired of performing as the said act, they formed Benz as a duo, with their name coming from both their names containing the given name Ben. Thompson, an old friend of Balogun, joined the group after Balogun saw him walking down the street. Their first rehearsals were at the Wally Foster Community Centre in Hackney.

Benz signed with their manager Paul Hendricks of Hendricks Records in July 1993 and with RCA Records in December 1993, after walking into their offices with a demo tape. Hendricks attempted to trademark "Benz Boom Rock Soul" in November 1995. The following September, the then-separate companies Daimler-Benz and Mercedes-Benz tried to sue the band on the basis of copyright infringement. They failed, and in August 2000, they were ordered to pay the band £935.

In December 1995, their single "Boom Rock Soul" charted at No. 62 on the UK Singles Chart, and in March 1996, their single "Urban City Girl" charted at No. 31 on the same chart. On 13 May 1996, they released "Miss Parker", which made it onto that chart at No. 35; they began broadcasting on Hacktown FM, their own radio station, the same day. The 22 June 1996 edition of Billboard noted that the said station played "R&B, rap, hip-hop, swing, and pop", and that such a combination could be expected on their debut album 3 Men Called Ben, which was due later that year. In 1997, on Hendricks Records, they had two further UK Singles Chart entries; "If I Remember" at No. 59, and "On a Sun-Day" at No. 73.

== Artistry ==
Benz drew influence from the Beatles, Public Enemy, Hackney, and Ofoedu's Christian beliefs (the B.I.G. in his name was an acronym for "Believe in God"). They described their music as "Boom Rock Soul", a term coined by their manager, based on perceived input to the band; they used a December 1995 issue of Echoes to explain that Balogun contributed the Boom, or "the deep hip hop, the hard bass", while Ofoedu contributed the Rock, and Thompson contributed the Soul.
