= What You Got (Abs song) =

2002 single by Abs

Single by Abs

from the album Abstract Theory
- B-side: "Lost for Words"
- Released: 19 August 2002
- Studio: Biffco
- Genre: Pop
- Length: 3:56
- Label: RCA; BMG; S
- Songwriters: Richard Breen; Richard "Biff" Stannard; Julian Gallagher; Errol Thompson; Althea Forrest; Joe Gibbs; Donna Reid
- Producers: Richard "Biff" Stannard; Julian Gallagher

Abs singles chronology
"What You Got" (2002)	"Shame" (2002)

Music video
- "What You Got" on YouTube

"What You Got" is a song by English singer and former Five member Abs, written by Abs, Richard "Biff" Stannard, and Julian Gallagher. Produced by the latter two, the track is based on Althea & Donna's 1977 song "Uptown Top Ranking", so Errol Thompson, Joe Gibbs, and Althea & Donna are given writing credits. The female vocals on the song were performed by Dawn Joseph, Shernette May, and Sharon Murphy.

"What You Got" was released as the lead single from Abs' debut album, Abstract Theory (2003), and was the first single released by a solo Five member following their split in November 2001. Issued on 19 August 2002, the single reached number four on the UK Singles Chart, entered the top 10 in Ireland and New Zealand, and became a top-40 hit in several other European countries and Australia.

== Critical reception ==
In his weekly chart commentary, British columnist James Masterton praised the "Uptown Top Ranking" sample, calling it a "perfect tribute", but wrote that the song is an example of "throwaway pop". British trade paper Music Week called the song's hook "infectious" and predicted the song would become a summer hit.

== Chart performance ==
On 25 August 2002, "What You Got" debuted at number four on the UK Singles Chart, spending three weeks in the top 10 and 11 weeks in the top 100. At the end of 2002, it was ranked at number 116 on the UK year-end chart. In neighbouring Ireland, the song debuted at number 11 on 22 August 2002 and later rose to number nine. Across continental Europe, the single entered the top 40 on the charts of Belgium (Flanders and Wallonia), Italy, the Netherlands, and Sweden while peaking at number 84 in Germany. It also reached the top 40 in Australia, where it peaked at number 33 and spent four weeks inside the ARIA Singles Chart top 50. In New Zealand, "What You Got" charted for 15 weeks, rising to its peak of number seven on 3 November 2002.

== Track listings ==
UK and Australian CD single

1. "What You Got" – 3:56
2. "Lost for Words" – 3:12
3. "What You Got" (Almighty radio edit) – 3:49
4. "What You Got" (video)

UK cassette single

1. "What You Got" – 3:56
2. "Lost for Words" – 3:12
3. "What You Got" (Almighty radio edit) – 3:49

European CD single

1. "What You Got" – 3:54
2. "Lost for Words" – 3:02

== Credits and personnel ==
Credits are lifted from the European CD single liner notes.

Studios

- Recorded, engineering, and programmed at Biffco Studios
- Mastered at Transfermation (London, England)

Personnel

- Abs – writing (as Richard Breen), vocals, instruments
- Richard "Biff" Stannard – writing, backing vocals, instruments, production
- Julian Gallagher – writing, instruments, production
- Errol Thompson – writing
- Althea Forrest – writing
- Joe Gibbs – writing
- Donna Reid – writing
- Dawn Joseph – backing vocals
- Shernette May – backing vocals
- Sharon Murphy – backing vocals
- Paul Gendler – guitar
- Neil Sidwell – trombone
- Dave Bishop – saxophone
- Paul Sprong – trumpet
- Alvin Sweeney – recording, engineering, programming
- Steve Robson – additional production, mixing
- Tom Elmhirst – mix engineering
- Richard Dowling – mastering

== Charts ==
=== Weekly charts ===
Chart (2002)	Peak position
Australia (ARIA)	33
Belgium (Ultratop 50 Flanders)	35
Belgium (Ultratop 50 Wallonia)	34
Europe (Eurochart Hot 100)	20
Europe (European Hit Radio)	35
Germany (GfK)	84
Ireland (IRMA)	9
Italy (FIMI)	37
Netherlands (Dutch Top 40)	29
Netherlands (Single Top 100)	37
New Zealand (Recorded Music NZ)	7
Poland Airplay (PiF PaF)	8
Scottish Singles Sales (Official Charts)	8
Sweden (Sverigetopplistan)	40
UK Singles (Official Charts)	4
UK Airplay (Music Week)	41

=== Year-end charts ===
Chart (2002)	Position
UK Singles (OCC)	116

== Release history ==
Region	Date	Format(s)	Label(s)	Ref.
United Kingdom	19 August 2002	CD; cassette	RCA; BMG; S	
Australia	2 September 2002	CD	RCA; BMG; S	
