= Boyz on Block =

British supergroup

- Also known as: BoB
- Origin: London, United Kingdom
- Genres: Pop
- Years active: 2019–2024
- Labels: DeeVu; Block
- Past members: Dane Bowers; Abz Love; Shane Lynch; Ben Ofoedu

Boyz on Block were a British pop supergroup formed in 2019, consisting of Abz Love from Five, Ben Ofoedu from Phats & Small, Dane Bowers from Another Level and Shane Lynch from Boyzone.

== Career ==
Having all met during their heyday, in 2019 while booked for the same show, Abz Love, Dane Bowers, Shane Lynch and Ben Ofoedu all found themselves on stage together and decided to form their own band.

On 20 November 2020, the group released a cover of East 17's "Stay Another Day" featuring songwriter and former East 17 member Tony Mortimer with an accompanying music video.

On 15 February 2021, their first official single, a cover of K-Ci & JoJo's "All My Life" was released along with an accompanying music video and some remixes. An album had been scheduled for a 2021 release.

On 31 January 2022, they released their cover of "Unbelievable" as a single.

On 21 September 2021, Boyz on Block appeared in the relaunch episode of British comedy music quiz panel show Never Mind the Buzzcocks during the "Live Identity Parade" segment.

== Discography ==
=== Singles ===
Single	Year
"Stay Another Day" (featuring Tony Mortimer)	2020
"All My Life"	2021
"Unbelievable"	2022
