= Abstract Theory =

Studio album by Abs
- Released: 1 September 2003
- Recorded: 2002–2003
- Genre: R&B, pop
- Length: 47:34
- Label: Sony BMG
- Producer: Brian Higgins

Singles from Abstract Theory
- 1. "What You Got" Released: 19 August 2002; 2. "Shame" Released: 25 November 2002; 3. "Stop Sign" Released: 26 May 2003; 4. "Miss Perfect" Released: 25 August 2003

Abstract Theory is the debut solo album released by former Five member Abs. The album was released on 1 September 2003, peaking at No. 29 on the UK Albums Chart. The album failed to find success elsewhere, and resulted in Abs being dropped from his record label just months later. The album spawned five singles: "What You Got", "Stop Sign", "Shame" and "Miss Perfect". The album received mixed to positive reviews from critics, comparing his material to that of his former band, Five.

== Background ==
Abs began work on the album following Five's split in late 2001. He soon signed a record deal with Sony BMG, who had previously contracted Five on a three-album deal. The album's first single, "What You Got", was released in August 2002 to moderate success, peaking at No. 4 on the UK Singles Chart. The album's second single, "Shame", was scheduled for release in November 2002, but was subsequently only released in Australia after the record company decided to market "Stop Sign" as the second British single. Arriving in May 2003, the song peaked at No. 10 on the UK Singles Chart. A third single, "Miss Perfect", was released on 25 August 2003, a week prior to the album's release, peaking at No. 5 on the UK Singles Chart. A fourth single, "7 Ways", was planned for release in November 2003, with a music video being released and several copies made available in stores from 10 November. However, the single was recalled on 11 November, and just three weeks later, Abs was dropped from his record label.

== Critical reception ==
In his retrospective review, Bren O'Callaghan of BBC said Abstract Theory "is capable of floating alone amidst a sea of chart craft".

== Track listing ==
No.	Title	Writer(s)	Producer(s)	Length
1.	"Stop Sign"	O'Connell; Sechleer; Wynn	Absolute	2:54
2.	"Miss Perfect" (featuring Nodesha)	Breen; Cooper; Lei; Coler; Powell; Higgins	Xenomania; Jimmy Jam and Terry Lewis (co.)	3:39
3.	"What You Got"	Breen; Stannard; Gallagher; Forrest; Reid; Thompson; Gibbs	Biffco	3:50
4.	"7 Ways" (featuring Evie Bicker)	Breen; Cooper; Coler; Powell; Higgins; Cowling	Xenomania	3:53
5.	"Back to the Limbo"	Breen; Jones; Cropper; Dunn; Jackson; Junior; Watkins; Wilson	Absolute	3:26
6.	"Rain"	Breen; David	Hod David	4:11
7.	"Turn Me Up"	Breen; Stannard; Gallagher; Ayers	Biffco	3:56
8.	"Lovers' Rock"	Breen; Stannard; Gallagher; Hale	Biffco	4:29
9.	"Roll with Me"	Breen; Stannard; Gallagher	Biffco	3:44
10.	"Emotional"	Breen; David	Hod David	3:39
11.	"Shame"	Breen; Wonder; Wright; Garrett; Stannard; Gallagher	Biffco	3:21
12.	"Angel"	Breen; Stannard; Gallagher	Biffco	4:43
13.	"The One and Only" (featuring Caroline)	Lucas Secon	Lucas Secon	3:37

• (co.) Co-producer.

B-Sides

- "Lost for Words" - 4:01
- "Come with a Little Bit More" - 3:17
- "Roll with Me" - 3:39
- "The Dog in Me" - 4:06
- "Music for Cars" - 3:09
- "Stop That Bitchin'" - 3:10
- "Spin" (Japanese Bonus Track) -3:04
- "What You Got" (Almighty Radio Edit) - 3:10
- "What You Got" (Reggae Mix) - 4:30
- "Stop Sign" (Bimbo Jones Remix) - 7:06
- "Stop Sign" (Nu Skool Brakez Remix) - 5:44
- "Miss Perfect" (Problem Kid Latin Vox) - 9:00
- "Miss Perfect" (Freshcut Style Vocal Mix) - 8:15
- "7 Ways" (Full Rap) - 3:59
- "7 Ways" (5AM Remix) - 6:40

== Personnel ==
Adapted credits from the booklet of Abstract Theory.

- Tracy Ackerman, Mary-Anne Morgan: backing vocals
- Tom Elmhirst, Steven Fitzmaurice, Tim Powell: mixing
- Alvin Sweeney: acoustic guitar, programming, recording
- Steve Lewinson: bass
- Richard "Biff" Stannard: timbales, drum programming, additional instruments
- Benedetto Antonio Caccavale: engineering, mixing
- Pete Hoffman: Pro Tools, mixing
- Ray Bermiston, Vincent Soyez: photography
- Simon Corkin: design

== Charts ==
Weekly chart performance for Abstract Theory
Chart (2003)	Peak position
UK Albums (OCC)	29
