= Stop Sign =

Single by Abs

from the album Abstract Theory
- B-side: "Music for Cars; Stop That Bitchin'"
- Released: May 26, 2003
- Recorded: 2002
- Genre: Dance-pop
- Length: 2:53
- Label: BMG
- Songwriter(s): Breen, Watkins, Wilson, O'Connell, Wynn
- Producer(s): Richard Stannard

Abs singles chronology
"Shame" (2002)	"Stop Sign" (2003)	"Miss Perfect" (2003)

"Stop Sign" is the third single released from former Five member Abs's debut solo album, Abstract Theory. The single found fair success, peaking at No. 10 in the UK and No. 53 in Australia. The song samples "Stop Sign" by Mel Wynn.

== Track listing ==
UK CD single

1. "Stop Sign" - 2:54
2. "Music for Cars" - 3:09
3. "Stop That Bitchin'" - 3:10
4. "Stop Sign" [Video] - 2:54

UK DVD single

1. "Stop Sign" [Video] - 2:54
2. "Stop Sign" [Bimbo Jones Remix] - 7:06
3. "Stop Sign" [NuSkool Brakez Remix] - 5:44
4. "Stop Sign" [Making Of The Video] - 2:00

== Weekly charts ==
Chart (2003)	Peak Position
Australia (ARIA)	33
UK Singles (OCC)	10
