= Now Phats What I Small Music =

Studio album by Phats & Small
- Released: 1999
- Genre: House
- Length: 49:11
- Label: Multiply Records
- Producer: Phats & Small

Phats & Small chronology
Now Phats What I Small Music (1999)	This Time Around (2001)

Singles from Now Phats What I Small Music
- 1. "Turn Around" Released: 2 March 1999; 2. "Feel Good" Released: 6 August 1999; 3. "Tonite" Released: 19 November 1999

Professional ratings
Review scores
Source	Rating
AllMusic	2.5/5 stars
NME	1.5/5 stars

Now Phats What I Small Music is the debut album by Phats & Small, a house music production team from Brighton, England. It was released in 1999, and contains ten songs. "Turn Around" became the team's biggest hit when released as a single.

The album title is a pun based on the series of compilation albums titled Now That's What I Call Music!.

== Track listing ==
1. "Turn Around" – 3:33
2. "Music for Pushchairs" – 6:18
3. "Electro Roll" – 5:10
4. "Theme from Sauce" – 7:43
5. "Feel Good" – 3:25
6. "On da Flo Yo" – 3:38
7. "Let Your Hair Down" – 4:45
8. "Tonite" – 3:45
9. "Brighton Beach" – 5:51
10. "Turn Around (Live at BBC Radio 1 Dance Party)" - 4:58

== Samples ==
- "Turn Around" samples "Reach Up" by Toney Lee and "The Glow of Love" by Change.
- "Feel Good" samples "Does It Feel Good" by B.T. Express.
- "On da Flo Yo" samples "What About Me" by Chic.
- "Tonite" samples "Heartache No. 9" by Delegation.
