= Night Walks =

Studio album by Sarah Nixey
- Released: 5 October 2018
- Length: 38:49
- Label: Black Lead Records
- Producer: Sarah Nixey, Jimmy Hogarth

Sarah Nixey chronology
Brave Tin Soldiers (2011)	Night Walks (2018)

Night Walks is the third studio album from British singer songwriter Sarah Nixey. It was released on 5 October 2018 through Black Lead Records. The album was written whilst Nixey was struggling with insomnia after the birth of her youngest child.

== Track listing ==
No.	Title	Length
1.	"Coming Up for Air"	3:29
2.	"The Zeppelin"	3:46
3.	"Burning Bridges"	3:13
4.	"Merry England"	3:12
5.	"Journey"	3:28
6.	"Love is Blue"	4:41
7.	"Night Walks"	1:01
8.	"Dancing at the Edge of the World"	3:17
9.	"Neon Moon"	4:03
10.	"Tiger Woman"	2:56
11.	"Follow Me"	2:54
12.	"The Planet of Dreams"	2:49
Total length:		38:49

== Personnel ==
- Sarah Nixey - vocals, instruments
- Jimmy Hogarth - instruments
- Martin Slattery - drums on "Coming Up for Air"
- Ava Nixey-Moore - flute on "The Planet of Dreams"
