= Child Psychology (song) =

Single by Black Box Recorder

from the album England Made Me
- Released: 1998
- Genre: Indie rock, spoken word
- Length: 4:08
- Label: Chrysalis
- Songwriters: Luke Haines, John Moore
- Producers: Black Box Recorder, Phil Vinall

Black Box Recorder singles chronology
"Child Psychology" (1998)	"England Made Me" (1998)

"Child Psychology" is the debut single by English indie rock band Black Box Recorder, released in 1998 from their debut album England Made Me. The song features a mixture of spoken word and a sung chorus. The spoken word tells of various incidents from childhood, including refusing to talk, expulsion from school for disruptive behaviour and parents arguing at Christmas.

The sung chorus featured a highly controversial line, "Life is unfair, kill yourself or get over it". This led to the song being banned by some UK radio stations (with the exception of XFM who gave it some daytime airplay) and MTV. However, the sardonic nature of the song also gained praise from critics, with one calling it 'refreshingly blunt'.

The chorus was featured in a series 3 episode of Monkey Dust and in the season 1 episode 19 of the Gilmore Girls titled "Emily in Wonderland", and consequently featured on the Gilmore Girls soundtrack, Our Little Corner of the World.

The song was released in the U.S. shortly after the Columbine massacre, which led to the chorus line being played backwards on the U.S. release.
