= Abz Love =

English singer-songwriter (born 1979)

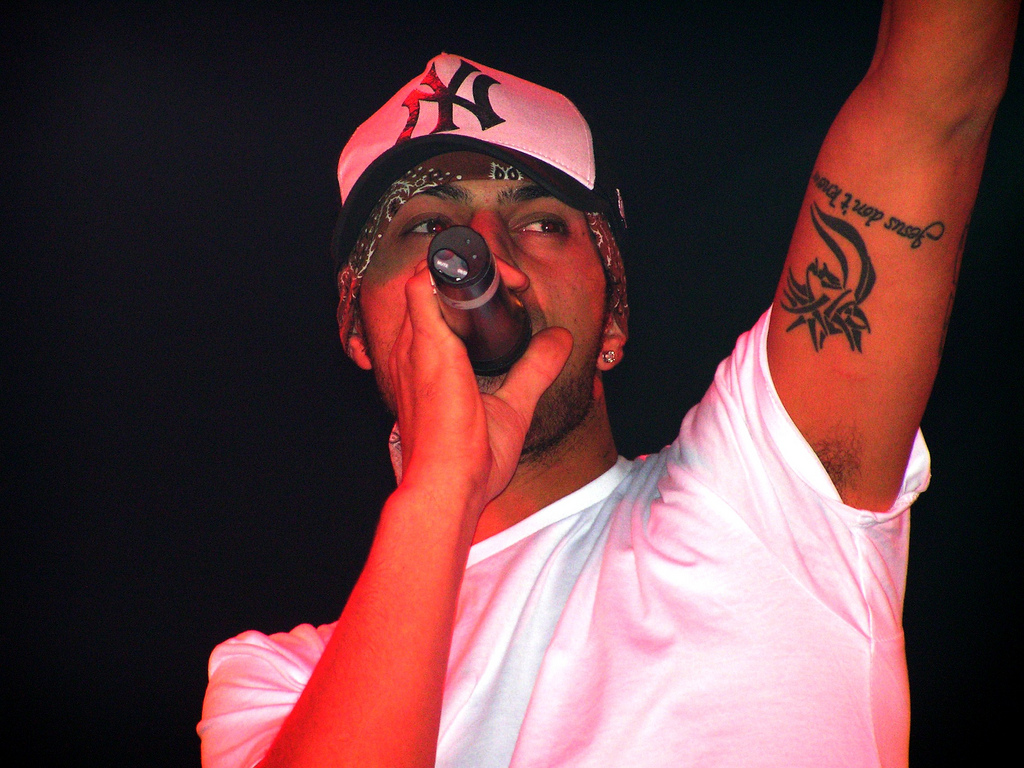
- Love performing with Five in 2001

Background information
- Also known as: Abs; Abs Breen
- Born: Richard Abidin Breen; 29 June 1979 (age 47); London, England
- Genres: Pop; R&B; hip hop
- Occupations: Singer; rapper; songwriter
- Instruments: Vocals; guitar
- Years active: 1997–2003, 2013–present
- Member of: Five
- Formerly of: Boyz on Block

Richard Abidin Breen (born 29 June 1979), better known as Abz Love, is an English singer, rapper, and songwriter. Abz is a member of the boy band Five and was also a member of the supergroup Boyz on Block.

In 2003, he released his debut solo album, Abstract Theory, which earned him a further three top-ten hits. In 2013, he appeared on All Star Mr & Mrs and became the runner-up for Channel 5's Celebrity Big Brother 12. In 2015, Love starred in BBC Two's documentary series Country Strife: Abz on the Farm, followed by a Christmas special titled Country Strife: Abz on the Christmas Farm.

== Early life ==
Richard Abidin Breen was born in London to Turkish father Turan Sanveren and Irish mother Kathleen Breen. He was raised on a council estate in Hackney, East London, where he was brought up until he left home at 16 to join boyband Five. He attended Cardinal Pole Catholic School in East London, and won a scholarship to attend the Italia Conti Stage School, where he studied acting. One day his teacher suggested he audition for a boy band that was being put together by Simon Cowell.

After performing in front of Cowell and a panel of managers, Abz was chosen from over 3,000 auditionees to be in the band Five (also known as 5ive). He changed his name to Abs in order to avoid confusion with bandmate Ritchie Neville.

Five went on to have international success, winning a Brit Award for Best Pop Act 2000, an MTV award and ASCAP awards for songwriting. Abz and fellow Five members Jason "J" Brown and Sean Conlon were involved in writing many of the band's hits such as "Everybody Get Up", "Keep On Movin'" and "If Ya Gettin' Down".

== Career ==
In 1997, Abz auditioned for Five, a new boy band-style group with "attitude and edge" and was eventually selected to be part of the band along with Ritchie Neville, Scott Robinson, Sean Conlon and Jason "J" Brown. Five subsequently were signed by Simon Cowell and BMG/RCA for a six-album deal. Five went on to enjoy massive success worldwide, selling over 20 million records in their four years. The group sold around 20 million copies worldwide. The band split up on 27 September 2001. In 2006 Five attempted a comeback without Conlon, but failed to sign with a new label and the band disbanded again.

After Five split, Abz was signed to Sony BMG by Simon Cowell as a solo artist and became the only band member to release a solo album. Abstract Theory had three top 10 hits on the UK singles chart with "What You Got" (No. 4), "Stop Sign" (No. 10), and "Miss Perfect" (No. 5). Abstract Theory reached No. 29 on the UK Albums Chart. After he was fired from Sony in December 2003, he changed his name to Abz Love and took a long hiatus from his music career. He told BBC Radio 1 that the change from "Abs" to "Abz" was because he was bored of "everyone referencing the six-pack".

In January 2013, Five returned to star the ITV2's reality show The Big Reunion. Brown didn't want to rejoin the group and Five announced that they were considering a new fifth member for the comeback, but withdrew to continue with the original four-member lineup. The band decided to continue as a four-piece performing live touring Europe. Also in 2013, Love was runner-up of Celebrity Big Brother 12. Love said he agreed to join the reality show because he was financially broke and living with his aunt Wendy. In August 2014 Love left Five, citing creative differences – years later he said he was unhappy just singing the hit songs and not recording new material.

In 2015 he starred in his own reality show, Country Strife: Abz on the Farm, a docu-series aired on BBC Two about his rural life in a farm in Wales. The show became a cult hit with viewers and critics alike. In January 2016, Abz released his first solo single in over a decade, "Cockadoodledoo".

From 2019, Love was a member of the supergroup Boyz on Block, along with Ben Ofoedu from Phats & Small, Dane Bowers from Another Level and Shane Lynch from Boyzone. On 20 November 2020, the group released their first single, a cover of East 17's 1994 single "Stay Another Day", featuring Tony Mortimer. They have been performing live touring Europe ever since.

In 2022, he joined the tenth series of dating reality show Celebs Go Dating, which aired on Channel 4.

On 24 February 2025, Abz Love posted on X that he was once again part of Five after leaving in 2014.

== Personal life ==
From 2009 to 2017, Love dated singer Vicky Fallon. In 2013 Love said that he has Asperger syndrome, a form of autism.

== Discography ==
=== Studio albums ===
Title	Album details	Peak chart positions	
Title	Album details	UK	SCO
Abstract Theory	Released: 1 September 2003; Label: Sony BMG; Format: CD, digital download	29	38
Golden	Released: 21 July 2020; Label: DK; Format: Digital download	—	—
"—" denotes releases that did not chart or were not released in that territory.

=== Extended plays ===
List of EPs
Title	EP details
The Starkid	Released: 29 June 2019; Label: Self-released; Format: Digital download
Love VI	Released: 1 November 2021; Label: Self-released; Format: Digital download

=== Singles ===
List of singles, with selected chart positions
Title	Year	Peak chart positions										Album
Title	Year	UK	AUS	BEL	EUR	IRL	ITA	NL	NZ	SCO	SWE	Album
"What You Got"	2002	4	33	35	20	9	37	37	7	4	40	Abstract Theory
"Shame"	2002	—	64	—	—	—	—	—	35	—	—	Abstract Theory
"Stop Sign"	2003	10	56	—	—	21	—	—	—	6	—	Abstract Theory
"Miss Perfect" (featuring Nodesha)	2003	5	—	—	—	13	—	—	—	6	—	Abstract Theory
"Cockadoodledoo" (featuring Vicky Fallon)	2015	—	—	—	—	—	—	—	—	—	—	Non-album singles
"Tictok"	2022	—	—	—	—	—	—	—	—	—	—	Non-album singles
"Faith"	2022	—	—	—	—	—	—	—	—	—	—	Non-album singles
"Evol"	2023	—	—	—	—	—	—	—	—	—	—	Non-album singles
"You"	2023	—	—	—	—	—	—	—	—	—	—	Non-album singles
"—" denotes releases that did not chart or were not released in that territory.

=== Other appearances ===
Title	Year	Other artist	Album
"Hornz"	2019	Eastside Greenbacks	E.S.G.B.

== Filmography ==
Year	Title	Role	Notes
2013	The Big Reunion	Himself	Series 1
2013	Celebrity Big Brother	Contestant	Series 12
2015	Country Strife: Abz on the Farm	Himself	BBC Two's reality show
2015	Country Strife: Christmas Farm	Himself	BBC Two's reality show
2022	Celebs Go Dating	Himself	Episode: "Abz Love"
