= Sarah Nixey =

- Born: 21 December 1973 (age 52)
- Origin: Dorset, England
- Genres: Pop/Electronica/Alternative
- Years active: 1996–present
- Label: Black Lead Records
- Website: sarahnixey.com

Sarah Nixey (born 21 December 1973) is an English singer-songwriter, best known as the vocalist in Black Box Recorder. Her debut solo album, Sing, Memory, was released on 19 February 2007, followed by Brave Tin Soldiers, released on 9 May 2011, and Night Walks, released on 5 October 2018. Her latest album, "Sea Fever", was released on 6 February 2026. Nixey currently resides in Dorset with her husband, music producer Jimmy Hogarth, whom she married in late 2010. Together, they have one son (born in late 2007), and a daughter (born in late 2012). From her previous marriage to John Moore, she has a daughter, born in 2001, and is a grandmother to her children.

== Biography ==
Nixey's mother has stated that she always believed her daughter would become a vocalist, even when she was just a baby. By the age of 4, Nixey was already singing pop songs she had learned from listening to the radio for her nursery class.

Whilst working as a backing vocalist for the folk band Balloon, Nixey was approached by John Moore (who had been the drummer for The Jesus and Mary Chain) and Luke Haines (frontman of The Auteurs), who had formed a duo and were looking for a vocalist. The duo convinced Nixey to join them by promising her that she would become famous, and in 1998, Black Box Recorder released their first album, England Made Me to critical acclaim.

Their second album, The Facts of Life, followed in 2000, and spawned a top 20 single of the same name, which saw the group perform on BBC's Top of the Pops. A further single followed, and in 2001, Nixey married John Moore, and they had a daughter together (Nixey and Moore divorced in 2006). In 2003, Black Box Recorder released their third album, Passionoia; their first and only album for One Little Indian records, following the demise of Nude Records.

In 2004, Black Box Recorder went on hiatus; not officially splitting, but with all three members deciding to pursue solo projects. In late 2005, Nixey announced she was working on a solo album, to be produced and co-written by James Banbury (a producer, programmer, writer and string arranger, as well as former member of The Auteurs). In mid-2006, she released her first two solo songs, "The Collector" and "Love & Exile". A third song was made available in September, titled "Strangelove", backed by remixes of "The Collector". Nixey's debut full-length solo album,Sing, Memory, was released on 19 February 2007, following the release of her third single, "When I'm Here With You", which was released on 29 January 2007, backed with the non-album track, "Watching Over You". Drowned in Sound awarded Sing, Memory 8/10 and MusicOMH gave it 4 stars. The album was given 7/10 by the NME and 6.3 by Pitchfork

In December 2007, Black Box Recorder teamed up with Art Brut to create the single "Christmas Number One" under the collaborative title of The Black Arts.

In October 2008, Black Box Recorder appeared at the Nick Sanderson (Earl Brutus) tribute concert. It was subsequently announced that the band would play their first headlining gig in five years at The Luminaire, Kilburn, London, in February 2009. They then played their last gig at Queen Elizabeth Hall, London's Southbank, on 23 July 2009. A final statement was issued just prior to the 2010 UK general election, stating, ″On Thursday 6 May, Black Box Recorder go to the country for the last time.″ Their last collaboration, two songs titled "Do You Believe in God?" and "Keep It in the Family", were released.

In April 2011, it was announced that Nixey had written and produced a new album, Brave Tin Soldiers to be released on 9 May 2011 on her own label Black Lead, with Cargo Records as distributor. The press release described the album as such: "lush piano, string and choral arrangements envelop her vocal, which reveals family secrets, erotic entanglements and tragic love stories". A week prior to the album, Brave Tin Soldiers EP was released, featuring remixes by dadahack and Kids Love. The Freelance Hellraiser also released a bootleg mix entitled Brave Tin Lovers.

The album Brave Tin Soldiers was given four stars by The Sunday Times and Scottish Sunday Express, very favourable reviews in The Independent and Uncut and radio support from BBC Radio 6 Music. Following this, on 18 July 2011 The Homecoming EP was released with remixes by Microfilm and Kids Love, plus a further reworking of Black Rose by Half Cousin. A music video was also made available via YouTube, directed and produced by Black Lead Films. Later that year "Nixey's Merry Christmas" single was released on 12 December 2011 with accompanying music video on YouTube.

The seductive third and final single from Brave Tin Soldiers was released on 23 April 2012. The Silk Threads EP included remixes by Kids Love and Microfilm, as well as a B-side, "Devil's Playground". Subsequently, a music video for the single was published on YouTube. Towards the end of that year, Nixey released another alternative seasonal anthem, "Christmas Without You", with radio support from BBC Radio 6 Music.

In 2025, Nixey released two new singles on streaming platforms worldwide. The first was Witness Tree, released 5 November 2025. Winter Solstice followed on 3 December, capturing the darkest and ceremonially significant point of the year, evoking introspection, change, and the turning of seasons. Nixey was also born on the Winter Solstice, and she celebrates this along with her birthday. A final single from this album, On This Wide Night was released on 7 January 2026. Her album Sea Fever proceeded this on 6 February, to much praise from the music press.

== Discography ==
=== Black Box Recorder ===
==== Singles ====
- "Child Psychology" – 1998
- "England Made Me" – 1998
- "The Facts of Life" (UK #20) – 2000
- "The Art of Driving" – 2000
- "These Are The Things" – 2003
- "The School Song" – 2003

==== Albums ====
- England Made Me – 1998
- The Facts of Life (UK #37) – 2000
- The Worst of Black Box Recorder – 2001
- Passionoia – 2003

==== Boxsets ====
- Life Is Unfair vinyl boxset – 2019

==== Remastered Albums ====
- England Made Me (Twenty-Fifth Anniversary Edition) - 2023

=== Solo ===
==== Singles ====
- "The Collector" Single (download only) – 2005
- "Strangelove" EP (7" vinyl & CD) – 2006
- "The Collector" Remixes EP (download only) – 2006
- "When I'm Here With You" (download only) – 2007
- "The Black Hit of Space" (download only) – 2007
- "Le Temps de L'Amour" (download only) – 2008
- "Brave Tin Soldier" EP (download only) – 2 May 2011
- "The Homecoming" EP (download only) – 18 July 2011
- "Coming Up For Air" EP (download only) – 13 July 2018
- "The Zeppelin" EP (download only) – 14 September 2018
- "Dancing At The Edge Of The World" EP (download only) – 21 December 2018
- "Witness Tree – Single (download only) 2025
- "Winter Solstice – Single (download only) 2025
- "On This Wide Night – Single (download only) 2026

==== Albums ====
- Sing, Memory (CD and download) – 17 February 2007
- Brave Tin Soldiers (CD and download) – 9 May 2011
- Night Walks (CD, Vinyl and download) – 5 October 2018
- Sea Fever (CD, Vinyl and download) – 6 February 2026
