= Fa11on =

Vicky Fallon
- Born: Vicky Fallon O'Neill; 3 June 1984 (age 41)
- Genres: Pop
- Occupations: Singer, songwriter, producer, TV personality

Vicky Fallon (born Vicky Fallon O'Neill; 3 June 1984), also known as Fa11on, is an English singer, songwriter, talent manager and television personality. She was previously engaged to 5ive star Abz Love and co-starred with him in their hit documentary series Country Strife: Abz on the Farm, which aired on BBC Two in 2015 and on the subsequent Christmas special Country Strife: Abz on the Christmas Farm.

During her career in music, Fallon has performed session and back up vocals for Disney, Pixar, Alesha Dixon and Russian singer Alsou. She has also written for the Sugababes and Alan Braxe. Currently, Fallon has a YouTube channel under the name, iamFa11on where she uploads covers of hit songs and also original material. Fallon is a featured artist on Abz Love's comedy single Cockadoodledoo (2016) and on Alan Braxe's single Nightwatcher (2008). Fallon has previously recorded, written and produced under the names Fa11on, Vikki O'Neill and Vicky Fallon.

== Early life ==
Fallon was born Vicky Fallon O'Neill on 3 June 1984.

== Girl Group (Smoke 2 Seven) ==
At the age of 16 Fallon was signed by president and owner of Curb Records Mike Curb as part of a 3 part girlband called Smoke 2 Seven. Smoke 2 Seven signed a 7-album deal and the group enlisted ex London Records MD Laurie Cokell as their manager. S2S toured with Daniel Bedingfield, released two UK singles "Been There Done That" (UK 26) and "Envy" (UK 79). Fallon left the band in 2002. After being released from her contract with Curb Records she returned to London and began working as a session singer and songwriter, working for Disney, Pixar, Alesha Dixon, Alsou and various other pop acts. In 2001 Fallon was booked to appear at an R.A.F tattoo event which involved flying in on a helicopter with ex 5ive member and popstar Abz Love.

== Eurovision scandal ==
In 2007 The Sunday Mirror newspaper ran a front-page headline accusing Scooch had used two hidden 'ghost singers' as part of their performance on Eurovision: Making Your Mind Up with the implication that this had given the group an advantage over rival entrants, although this was perfectly allowed. This led to accusations of miming by the group. Fallon was one of the two hidden singers.

== Underground solo career ==
In 2006 O'Neill dropped her surname and began performing as 'Vicky Fallon.' Fallon wrote and recorded a debut album with Cornwall-based producer and songwriter Gareth Young. During this time Fa11on also co-wrote "Shake It" for the Sugababes. The song appears on the B-side of the single Easy (2006). She was offered a deal by Mathew Knowles, father and manager of Beyoncé. In December 2007 Fallon parted ways with Mathew Knowles and left Music World.

In 2008 Fallon started to work with the record label Eye Industries. She wrote a collection of tracks for other dance artists with DJ & producer Alan Braxe. She is featured along with Killa Kella on Alan Braxe's song Nightwatcher, which received solid airplay on Radio 1 and enjoyed relative success on the UK underground. Her debut album caught the attention of 2point9 and they set about developing her as a solo artist. Fallon co-wrote with Jersey-based record producer Ray Hedges before abandoning the project in 2009.

== Finding love ==
In 2009 Abz Love reconnected with Fallon via Myspace and they became a couple. Love was battling drug addiction & had no job, no money & nowhere to live. Fallon looked after Love & took a hiatus from songwriting & performing to focus on getting his career back in track & support him back to health. She became his official manager in late 2009 and is credited with managing Love's career through ITV2's The Big Reunion, Celebrity Big Brother, and most recently with BBC two for the couple's hit documentary series Country Strife: Abz on the Farm which she co-starred in and co-produced with Andrea Cornes.

== Country Strife : Abz on the Farm ==
In August 2015, Country Strife: Abz on the Farm aired BBC Two. Series one featured three 30 minutes episodes. The show follow Fa11on and then partner Abz Love's journey throughout 2014 as they purchased a dilapidated smallholding and navigated the highs and lows of adjusting to rural life on a budget. The show was co-produced by Fallon & Andrea Cornes of Tin Can Island and commissioned by Tom MacDonald. Many felt BBC Two were taking a risk in introducing Love to their audience and were criticised heavily for it. But the show was an unexpected success and there was a Christmas special commissioned Country Strife: Abz on the Christmas farm which aired on Boxing day 2015.

=== Critic reviews – Abz on the Farm ===
Abz on the farm Sam Wollaston (TV critic for The Guardian) - "It's perfect, from a TV point of view if not as a first attempt as self-sufficiency. Can this really be real, or is it mockumentary? Whichever, it's hilarious and brilliant."

Ellen E Jones (TV critic for The Independent) - Abz Love is a star (re)born. BBC2 isn't usually associated with reality television, but it was immediately obvious why commissioners had made this exception. Gerald O'Donavan (TV critic for the telegraph) states "Abz on the Farm was abzolutely hilarious."

== YouTube ==
In 2013, Fallon n started a YouTube channel where she posted a mix of covers and original songs. Her most successful video, "Boy (You’re Amazing) Just The Way You Are" is a cover of Bruno Mars hit single. She has also covered Adele, Emeli Sande, Bryan Adams, Chris Brown and Coldplay. Fa11on also has released original material in the form of lyric videos. Included in these videos is "Lay Your Head Down", " Sleeping Like Strangers" and "Rock Bottom Feat. Abz Love".

In December 2015 Love & Fallon released a music video on Love's YouTube channel of their comedy single “Cockadoodledoo”. Love describes the song as sounding somewhere between Souljia Boy's "Crank That" and "Old MacDonald Had A Farm." It became available as a digital download worldwide on 4 January 2016.

On 23 July 2017, Fallon released a cover of Shadow of the Day by Linkin Park to her YouTube channel. This was a tribute to the late Chester Bennington.

== Blog ==
In December 2015 Fallon launched an official blog charting the couple's progress following on from their documentary series Abz on the farm.

== Personal life ==
Fallon & Love's split in March 2017 was covered heavily by the UK media. After claiming in a tweet in March that the split was amicable, Love then sold a story to the Daily Mirror in April accusing Fallon of being a prostitute and an abuser, claims which Fallon strongly denied. Fallon maintains that she ended the relationship after suffering 8 years of verbal, emotional & physical abuse from Love behind closed doors. In May 2017 Fallon accused Love of being a ‘covert narcissist’ in a YouTube video.

Fallon did live in London with her then fiancée, record producer Johnny Douglas. On 5 January 2019 Fallon gave birth to her first child, Isabella Grace Douglas. She then separated from him.

== TV appearances ==
- All Star Mr. & Mrs. Series 5 Episode 4 (2013)
- Big Reunion Series 1 Episode 4 ( 2013)
- Celebrity Big Brother 12 Day 15 (2013)
- Good Morning Britain (2015)
- Country Strife: Abz on the Farm Series 1 Episode 1, 2 & 3 (2015)
- Country Strife: Abz on the Christmas Farm (2015)
