= Turn Around (Phats & Small song) =

1999 single by Phats & Small

Single by Phats & Small

from the album Now Phats What I Small Music
- Released: 22 March 1999
- Genre: Dance
- Length: 3:33 (radio edit); 6:31 (original mix)
- Label: Multiply
- Songwriters: Mauro Malavasi; David Romani; Wayne Garfield; Toney Lee; Eric Matthew
- Producers: Jason "Phats" Hayward; Russell Small

Phats & Small singles chronology
"Turn Around" (1999)	"Feel Good" (1999)

Music video
- "Turn Around" on YouTube

"Turn Around" is a song by British electronic dance music duo Phats & Small. It was released as their debut single on 22 March 1999 through Multiply Records, serving as the lead single from their first album, Now Phats What I Small Music (1999). The song samples vocals, primarily from the first verse, of Toney Lee's "Reach Up" and Change's "The Glow of Love". It reached number two on the UK Singles Chart. The accompanying music video was filmed at various locations in the city of Brighton and Hove. Ben Ofoedu appears in the video, miming to the vocals.

== Impact and legacy ==
MTV Dance ranked "Turn Around" number 38 in their list of "The 100 Biggest 90's Dance Anthems of All Time" in 2011. Tomorrowland included the song in their official ranking of "The Ibiza 500" in 2020.

== Track listings ==
- UK CD single
1. "Turn Around" (radio edit)
2. "Turn Around" (Norman Cook remix)
3. "Turn Around" (Chris & James remix)
- UK 12-inch single

A1. "Turn Around" (original 12-inch mix)
B1. "Turn Around" (Norman Cook remix)
B2. "Turn Around" (Chris & James remix)

- UK cassette single
1. "Turn Around" (radio edit)
2. "Turn Around" (Olav Basoski remix)
- Belgian CD single
1. "Turn Around" (original radio edit) – 3:50
2. "Turn Around" (original 12-inch mix) – 6:22
- French CD single
1. "Turn Around" (radio edit) – 3:30
2. "Turn Around" (original 12-inch mix) – 7:36
- Australian and New Zealand CD single
1. "Turn-A-Round" (radio edit) – 3:48
2. "Turn-A-Round" (original 12-inch mix) – 7:39
3. "Love (Is What You Need)" (original 12-inch mix) – 8:24
4. "Turn-A-Round" (Luxury Unlimited remix) – 8:26
5. "Turn-A-Round" (Chris & James remix) – 7:30
6. "Turn-A-Round" (Olav Basoski remix) – 7:56

== Charts ==
=== Weekly charts ===
Chart (1999)	Peak position
Australia (ARIA)	59
Austria (Ö3 Austria Top 40)	26
Belgium (Ultratop 50 Flanders)	2
Belgium (Ultratop 50 Wallonia)	7
Belgium Dance (Ultratop Flanders)	1
Canada (Nielsen SoundScan)	10
Estonia (Eesti Top 20)	10
Europe (Eurochart Hot 100)	12
Europe (European Hit Radio)	18
France (SNEP)	9
Germany (GfK)	18
Greece (IFPI)	6
Iceland (Íslenski Listinn Topp 40)	37
Ireland (IRMA)	7
Italy (Musica e dischi)	8
Netherlands (Dutch Top 40)	7
Netherlands (Single Top 100)	10
Norway (VG-lista)	14
Scottish Singles Sales (Official Charts)	2
Sweden (Sverigetopplistan)	25
Switzerland (Schweizer Hitparade)	8
UK Singles (Official Charts)	2
UK Dance (Official Charts)	1

=== Year-end charts ===
Chart (1999)	Position
Belgium (Ultratop 50 Flanders)	37
Belgium (Ultratop 50 Wallonia)	37
Europe (Eurochart Hot 100)	43
Europe (European Hit Radio)	32
France (SNEP)	25
Germany (Media Control)	87
Netherlands (Dutch Top 40)	74
Netherlands (Single Top 100)	73
Switzerland (Schweizer Hitparade)	41
UK Singles (OCC)	24
UK Airplay (Music Week)	12
UK Club Chart (Music Week)	1
UK Pop (Music Week)	1

== Certifications ==
Region	Certification	Certified units/sales
Belgium (BRMA)	Gold	25,000^{*}
France (SNEP)	Gold	250,000^{*}
United Kingdom (BPI)	Platinum	600,000^{‡}
^{*} Sales figures based on certification alone.^{‡} Sales+streaming figures based on certification alone.

== Remixes ==
"Turn Around (Hey What's Wrong with You)"

Single by Phats & Small, Calvo, Futuristic Polar Bears, Maison & Dragen and Mousse T.
- Released: 2016
- Label: Armada Music
- Songwriters: Mauro Malavasi; David Romani; Wayne Garfield; Toney Lee; Eric Matthew
- Producers: Phats & Small

=== "Turn Around" (Phats & Small vs. The Cube Guys) ===
This EP was released in 2012 via Ego. It contains original and dub mixes.

1. "Turn Around" (Original Mix) – 6:55
2. "Turn Around" (Dub Mix) – 6:55

=== "Turn Around (Hey What's Wrong with You)" ===
In 2016, "Turn Around" was released as a remix package under Armada Music, using Ofoedu's original vocals. It contains remixes by Calvo, Futuristic Polar Bears, Maison & Dragen, Mousse T. and an updated version by Phats & Small.

1. "Turn Around (Hey What's Wrong with You) (Extended Mix)" - 5:29
2. "Turn Around (Hey What's Wrong with You) (Calvo Extended Remix)" - 4:48
3. "Turn Around (Hey What's Wrong with You) (Futuristic Polar Bears Extended Remix)" - 4:26
4. "Turn Around (Hey What's Wrong with You) (Maison & Dragen Extended Remix)" - 4:40
5. "Turn Around (Hey What's Wrong with You) (Mousse T.'s Dirty Little Funker Extended Mix)" - 8:13

In 2018, it was released in a bootleg version by Youngr, also under Armada Music.

1. "Turn Around" (Youngr bootleg) – 3:26

Three new remixes came out in 2020, also under Armada.

1. "Turn Around (Hey What's Wrong with You) (Robosonic Extended Remix)" - 7:04
2. "Turn Around (Hey What's Wrong with You) (Mousse T.'s Dirty Little Funker Extended Mix)" - 8:13
3. "Turn Around (Hey What's Wrong with You) (Babert Extended Remix)" - 5:30
