= Uptown Top Ranking =

1977 single by Althea & Donna

Single by Althea & Donna
- B-side: "Calico Suit"
- Released: 1977
- Genre: Reggae; pop
- Length: 3:53
- Label: Lightning
- Songwriters: Althea & Donna; Errol Thompson
- Producer: Joe Gibbs

Althea & Donna singles chronology
"Uptown Top Ranking" (1977)	"Puppy Dog Song" (1978)

Official audio
- "Uptown Top Ranking" on YouTube

"Uptown Top Ranking" is a song by Jamaican teenage singers Althea Forrest and Donna Reid, recorded when they were 17 and 18 years old respectively. Released in 1977, the song comprises the girls ad-libbing to deejay track "Three Piece Suit" by Trinity. The lyrics were written by the duo and Errol Thompson. It was produced by Joe Gibbs, using a re-recording of the riddim of the 1967 Alton Ellis song "I'm Still in Love", which had already been re-popularised in the 1970s by Marcia Aitken's cover "I'm Still in Love With You Boy", and "Three Piece Suit" by Trinity, to which "Uptown" was an "answer record".

The record was initially recorded as a joke. It was accidentally played by BBC Radio 1 DJ John Peel resulting in numerous requests for additional plays. With early championing by Peel and a performance on Top of the Pops, it soon became a surprise hit, reaching number one on the UK Singles Chart in February 1978. The track spent a total of 11 weeks in the chart. Althea & Donna became the youngest female duo to reach the number-one spot on the UK chart.

== Charts ==
=== Weekly charts ===
Chart (1977–1978)	Peak position
Belgium (Ultratop 50 Flanders)	23
Ireland (IRMA)	2
Netherlands (Dutch Top 40)	24
Netherlands (Single Top 100)	25
UK Singles (OCC)	1

=== Year-end charts ===
Chart (1978)	Position
UK Singles (OCC)	44

== Certifications ==
Region	Certification	Certified units/sales
New Zealand (RMNZ)	Gold	15,000^{‡}
United Kingdom (BPI)	Gold	400,000^{‡}
^{‡} Sales+streaming figures based on certification alone.

== Sampling ==
The song was sampled in Abs Breen's 2002 UK top 10 single "What You Got".

== See also ==
- List of UK Singles Chart number ones of the 1970s
- List of one-hit wonders on the UK Singles Chart
