= Trinity (musician) =

Jamaican reggae deejay and producer (1954–2021)

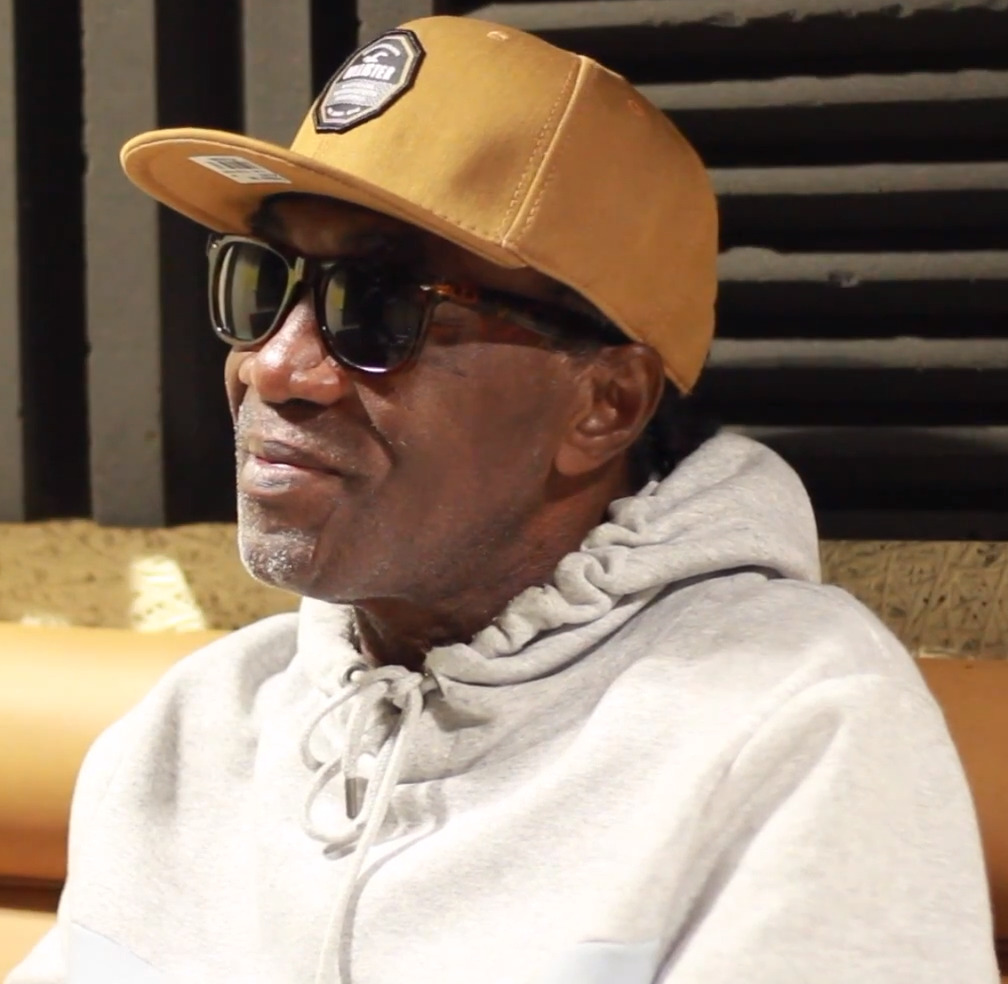
- Brammer in 2019

Background information
- Also known as: Junior Brammer
- Born: Wade Brammer; 10 February 1954; Kingston, Jamaica
- Died: 9 April 2021 (aged 67) Saint Andrew Parish, Jamaica
- Genres: Reggae, dancehall
- Instrument: Vocals
- Years active: 1970s–2021

Trinity a.k.a. Junior Brammer (born Wade Brammer, 1954 – 9 April 2021) was a Jamaican reggae deejay and producer, whose career began in the mid-1970s and continued into the 1990s.

== Biography ==
He was born in 1954 in Kingston, Jamaica, and Brammer was educated at the Alpha Boys School.

After initially working under the name Prince Glen, he began working under the stage name Trinity, taken from the Spaghetti Western character. After working as a deejay on several Kingston sound systems, he made his debut recording in March 1976 with "Set Up Yourself" for producer Joseph Hoo Kim. "Words of The Prophet" followed for Yabby You, who also produced his debut album, Shanty Town Determination, which was re-released on Steve Barrow's Blood and Fire (record label) in 2000, replete with extended Rockers discomixes. Late in 1976, he joined up with Dillinger for the "Crank Face" single, and the Clash album, produced by UK-based producer Clement Bushay. In 1977, Trinity was in great demand, recording more than 20 singles for producers including Winston Riley, Tommy Cowan, Joe Gibbs and Yabby You. His biggest hit was "Three Piece Suit" for Gibbs, featuring Trinity toasting over a new version of Alton Ellis's "I'm Still in Love with You" riddim. Errol Thompson incorporated echoed fragments of Alton Ellis's recording into the melody. The song's lyrics anticipated the move from cultural themes to the more material and sexual concerns of the dancehall era. This prompted an answer record from Althea & Donna using the same rhythm, in the form of the UK-chart topping "Uptown Top Ranking". Trinity recorded "Slim Thing" in response, but failed to match Althea & Donna's success. 1977 also saw the release of the Uptown Girl album, produced by Bunny Lee, and strong albums in 1978 in the form of Three Piece Chicken and Chips (with Ranking Trevor) and Showcase. In 1978, Trinity also performed at the One Love Peace Concert in Kingston.

In the later 1970s, Trinity began producing both himself and other artists, starting his own Flag Man record label. In 1979, he recorded the duet "Funny Feeling" with Dennis Brown, and joined up with Barrington Levy for "Lose Respect" and "I Need a Girl" in 1979 and 1980 respectively. Subsequent albums met with diminishing commercial success, and Trinity switched from deejaying to singing, releasing the albums Telephone Line and Hold Your Corner in 1987 under the name Junior Brammer.

Trinity's younger brother, Robert Brammer, also had a successful career as a deejay, recording under the name Clint Eastwood.

Trinity died on 9 April 2021, at the National Chest Hospital in Saint Andrew Parish, Jamaica, at the age of 67 of complications from diabetes.

== Albums ==
as Trinity

- Shanty Town Determination (1977) TR International, reissued in 2000 on Blood and Fire in an expanded form
- Clash (1977) Burning Sounds (Dillinger verses Trinity)
- Three Piece Suit (1977) Joe Gibbs
- "Real Ranking" (1977) Althea Douna (sic) & Trinity (Jam Sound Production) 12" Disco Mix
- Uptown Girl (1977) Magnum, reissued as Side Kiks (1983) Vista Sounds
- Three Piece Chicken and Chips (1978) Cha Cha (with Ranking Trevor)
- At His Toasting Best (1978) Gorgon
- Dreadlocks Satisfaction (1978) Jackpot
- Showcase (1978) Burning Sounds
- African Revolution (1979) GG's
- Trinity Meet The Mighty Diamonds (1979) Gorgon (with The Mighty Diamonds)
- Rock In The Ghetto (1979) Trojan
- African Christmas (1979), Top Ranking - with Hortense Ellis
- Have a Little Faith (1980) Micron, also issued (2002) Thompson Sounds, and as Life (2004) Clocktower, with different track listing
- Bad Card (1981) Joe Gibbs
- Full House (1981) JB
- Yabby You Meets Trinity At Dub Station (1982) Yabby U
- Teen Jam (1983) Kingdom (Trinity featuring Little Culture)
- The Best Of Trinity (1985) Culture Press
- Around The World (1986) Yard International
- Natty Tired To Carry Load (1988) Burning Sounds
- Burning (1992) Lagoon
- Big Big Man (1993) Esoldun
- DJ Originators Head To Head Vol 2 (200?) Rocky One (Prince Far I & Trinity)
- Eye To Eye (2013) Irie Ites

as Junior Brammer

- Telephone Line (1987) John Dread
- Hold Your Corner (1987) Live & Learn
