= Lounge rock =

Lounge rock is a style of music that is a fusion of folk, 1950s/1960s rock, and jazz. Other influences come from Brazilian music, primarily the early works of Milton Nascimento. Currently, Norwegian and Dire Straits Sondre Lerche are the best known for this style. Notably, the term has also been applied to Pink Floyd's The Dark Side of the Moon.
