= Black Box Recorder =

English rock group

- Origin: London, England
- Genres: Indie pop, indie rock, synth-pop, spoken word
- Years active: 1998–2003, 2007–2010
- Members: Luke Haines; John Moore; Sarah Nixey

Black Box Recorder are an English indie rock band. They debuted in 1998 with England Made Me and followed this up with The Facts of Life, which gave them their first hit with the single of the same name in April 2000. Their third album, Passionoia, was released in 2003. There is also a compilation album, The Worst of Black Box Recorder, a collection of B-sides, cover versions and remixes.

Black Box Recorder consisted of Sarah Nixey, Luke Haines (of The Auteurs), and John Moore (formerly of The Jesus and Mary Chain). Moore and Nixey married in 2001, and had one child. Despite divorcing in 2006, the pair have continued to work together over the years.

Although there was no official announcement of the band's split, Black Box Recorder were on hiatus during the mid-2000s after their contract with One Little Indian ended. The band collaborated with Art Brut during 2007, and released the single "Christmas Number One" under the name The Black Arts. In October 2008 the band played live at the Nick Sanderson tribute concert at the London Forum.

In late 2008 it was announced the band would be playing a gig at The Luminaire on 18 February 2009. The gig quickly sold out, and a second appearance at the same venue announced. These sold-out shows were the band's first headlining appearances in five years.

A new album was planned for 2009, however, the record was never released. On 16 April 2010, the band announced a 'final statement' after releasing their last single, "Keep It in the Family" b/w "Do You Believe in God?" on 6 May 2010.

In November 2023 a remastered version of England Made Me was released on Spotify for the 25th anniversary of the album.

In November 2025, a reunion concert at the London Palladium was announced for May 2026, following interest shown in the band by Billie Eilish. Black Box Recorder played their first gig in 17 years at Leeds’ Brudenell Social Club on May 19, 2026. This was followed on May 22 by the concert at the London Palladium.

== Discography ==
=== Studio Albums ===
List of studio albums, with selected chart positions and certifications
Title	Album details	Peak chart positions		
Title	Album details	SCO	UK	UK Indie
England Made Me	Released: July 20, 1998; Label: Chrysalis Records	─	110	─
The Facts of Life (album)	Released: May 1, 2000; Label: Nude Records	52	37	4
Passionoia	Released: March 3, 2003; Label: One Little Indian Records	─	179	22

=== Compilation albums ===
Year	Album details
2001	The Worst of Black Box Recorder: Release date: 21 August 2001; Label: Jetset Records

=== Singles ===
Year	Single	Peak positions	Album
Year	Single	UK	Album
1998	"Child Psychology"	82	England Made Me
1998	"England Made Me"	89	England Made Me
2000	"The Facts of Life"	20	The Facts of Life
2000	"The Art of Driving"	53	The Facts of Life
2003	"These Are the Things"	91	Passionoia
2003	"The School Song"	102	Passionoia
