= Phats & Small =

British electronic dance music duo

- Origin: Brighton, East Sussex, England
- Genres: House, dance-pop
- Years active: 1998–present
- Members: Jason "Phats" Hayward; Russell Small
- Past members: Ben Ofoedu; Tony Thompson

Phats & Small are an English electronic dance music duo formed in Brighton, in 1998, and composed of Jason "Phats" Hayward and Russell Small. They are best known for their single "Turn Around", which became an international hit in 1999.

== Musical career ==
Phats & Small appeared on the scene in 1998 with "Turn Around", a track that sampled Toney Lee's "Reach Up" and Change's "The Glow of Love". The song debuted at number three in the UK Singles Chart before climbing to number two, with career sales of this hit amassing them £5,000 in total due to their recording contract. Singer Ben Ofoedu appears in the video for the track miming to the vocals. Future releases featured his voice but "Turn Around" featured Lee's voice. However, Ofoedu has been known to perform the track live. In 1999, they also released their first album, Now Phats What I Small Music, a play on their name and the compilation series Now That's What I Call Music!. Ofoedu sang on two tracks, "Feel Good" and "Tonite", which were released as singles. In 1999, Phats & Small also achieved notoriety for remixing the Earth, Wind & Fire track "September" and Simply Red's "Ain't That a Lot of Love". Other remixes around the same time included PJ - "Happy Days", Space Raiders - "I Need The Disko Doktor", High Steppers - "I Will Follow" and pop group A1's single "Be the First to Believe".

Ofoedu left the group to pursue a solo career as singer, songwriter and producer, and his backing vocalist Tony Thompson was promoted to main vocalist. He sang on most tracks in Phats & Small's second album, This Time Around, released in 2001, which featured an eponymous single, as well as "Change" and "Respect The Cock" (which was supposed to feature the phrase uttered by Tom Cruise in the film Magnolia). The second album was co-produced by Jimmy Gomez.

After a few years away from the recording studio, Phats & Small returned in 2005 with a new vocalist, Ryan Molloy, and a new album, Soundtrack to Our Lives, featuring the single "Sun Comes Out", this track sung by a returning Ofoedu and a new female vocalist, Carrie Luer.

In 2016, a new version of "Turn Around" was made featuring new vocals from Ofoedu.

Small is also one half of the production team The Freemasons, along with James Wiltshire (Jimmy Gómez) who was a co-producer for Phats & Small.

Small is a Brighton & Hove Albion F.C. fan after being taken to games as a youngster by his uncle.

Their song "Turn Around" was on the CD of the computer game K.S.-n-Kickin.

== Discography ==
=== Studio albums ===
Title	Album details	Peak chart positions				
Title	Album details	UK	EUR	GER	NED	SWI
Now Phats What I Small Music	Released: 11 November 1999; Label: Multiply (MULTY6); Formats: LP, CS, CD	102	75	19	84	52
This Time Around	Released: 18 June 2001; Label: Multiply (MULTY8); Formats: CS, CD	—	—	—	—	—
Soundtrack to Our Lives	Released: 2004; Label: Modul (82876512412); Formats: CD	—	—	—	—	—
"—" denotes items that did not chart or were not released in that territory.

=== Singles ===
Year	Title	Peak chart positions										Certifications	Album
Year	Title	UK	UK Dance	AUS	BEL	EUR	FRA	GER	IRE	NED	SWI	Certifications	Album
1999	"Turn Around"	2	1	59	2	12	9	18	7	10	8	UK: Platinum; BEL: Gold; FRA: Gold	Now Phats What I Small Music
1999	"Feel Good"	7	4	—	21	28	35	64	25	46	20		Now Phats What I Small Music
1999	"Tonite"	11	26	—	44	48	—	36	—	40	15		Now Phats What I Small Music
2000	"Harvest for the World"	—	—	—	—	—	—	90	—	—	59		Now Phats What I Small Music
2001	"This Time Around"	15	9	84	—	62	—	92	46	—	61		This Time Around
2001	"Change"	45	30	—	—	—	—	96	—	—	96		This Time Around
2001	"Respect the Cock"	—	—	—	—	—	—	—	—	—	—		This Time Around
2003	"You're Rude (Get Fucked)"	—	—	—	—	—	—	—	—	—	—		Non-album single
2004	"Sun Comes Out"	—	—	—	30	—	—	57	—	45	—		Soundtrack to Our Lives
"—" denotes items that did not chart or were not released in that territory.

== See also ==
- List of performers on Top of the Pops
