= Overlord X =

British hip hop artist

Overlord X (born Benjamin Balogun, in Hackney) was one of the earliest British hip hop artists to receive national acclaim in the UK, with his most well known song still being his second single release, "14 Days in May" (Westside Records, 1988) about Edward Earl Johnson. He worked with DJ Sir Preme T as well as other members of the "X Posse". He runs a music and creative production company.

== History ==
Overlord X first began rapping at the age of 14, before which he practised DJing – something which helped him in his later career to produce and record his own music for his songs. He first came to attention on one of John Peel's sessions, with three tracks recorded on 24 November 1988. He returned to the show on 2 August 1988, by now having joined Sir Preme T to record four further tracks.

Overlord X's first release was the song "Let There Be Rock" on the first of the Hard as Hell compilations in 1987. This was followed by his break-through single, "14 Days in May" (Westside Records, released 21 March 1988) where he raged against capital punishment, and in particular the case of Edward Earl Johnson, who was executed on the grounds of a confession that he claimed was made under duress.

The record was a success, and brought X to the attention of Mango Records, who signed him to record some singles and an album as the X Possee, featuring many other artists who were part of Overlord X's crew. The album, Project X (Mango, 1989), introduced a new generation of rappers to the UK audience.

This album was quickly followed by X's solo debut album. However, at the time Westside Records refused to grant permission for "14 Days in May" to be used on the album, and so X had to record a sequel instead, called "14 Days in Hell". The album, Weapon Is My Lyric (Mango, 1989), pioneered a new British hip hop, laying a blue print for a rock influenced hardcore style that was to dominate the scene for many years.

The album's success led to some strange ventures: one of the tracks, "Visa To Rock", was re-recorded by Overlord X with new lyrics relating to chess for a BBC documentary about the game fronted by a young Stephen Fry. A clip of the documentary, featuring Overlord X's re-recorded tune, was shown when Fry was a guest on Jonathan Ross' BBC chat show in 2005. His success also led to a long-running feud with fellow rapper MC Duke, which culminated in X recording the diss tune "Die Hard" about the rapper on his "You Oughta Get Rushed" (Mango, 1990) single. Overlord X then went on to perform for The Late Show in 1991, with huge success.

That single was taken from the follow-up album X Versus the World (Mango, 1990) which features a distinctive cover and comic strip story by artist Joe Jusko. The album also gave prominence to X's alter egos, Sidekick and Lord V/Lord Vader – Sidekick was X with the pitch of his voice turned higher, and Lord V was him with the pitch turned down. The album was a critical and scene success, and Overlord X was working on a third album – Master of Menace (unreleased) when he decided he did not like the way the scene was heading, and left his record label.

In 1990, Jah Shaka recorded a crossover dubplate discomix tune with Overlord X (under the moniker Raggafunk ) entitled "Come And Get Me" , a retake of a tune from Shaka’s Dub Symphony album which was eventually released on the Island Records' subsidiary label Mango.

Working under the name Tim Shade, Overlord X formed the Benz, who released singles between 1995 and 1997. This led to trouble with Mercedes-Benz, who accused the group of attempting to infringe their trademark when they attempted to register a dissimilar trademark that used the name Benz. In 2000, the courts decided against the Mercedes Benz objection, and the company were forced to pay £935. Benz released a number of records on the Hacktown Records (a sub-label of BMG group) and Hendricks Records record labels including the Top 40 hits "Urban City Girl", "Miss Parker" as well as "Boom Rock Soul". The band members were known as Tim Shade, Big Ben and Darkboy.

He started record producing in 1998 working with unsigned acts. One of the acts X worked with was called Cherise, and she went on to win the MOBOs best unsigned award with a track he produced called "2nd Best" that led her to sign an album deal with WEA/East West Records. Overlord X at this time was working with a keyboardist/engineer and producer and joined forces with Mike soul The duo combined a production team called The beatruners and produced numerous tracks together over three years. They were later known as Clubz Generation. During this time he also came across a young Chinese music promoter called Jessie Tsang. This was in 1999 long before she became CEO of Solar Records. She was hired as part of Overlord X's marketing team. X offered her a long term position in his company but Tsang left to join United Business Media. Tsang gives credit to Overlord X for "my first real introduction into the whole music business" in an interview in the August 2018 edition of Soul Survivors Magazine.

Just before that, X put together the girl group Tommi, who released the single "What Part of No" which garnered industry attention and lead to their signing with Universal and then Sony. Their second single release "Like What" got to number 12 in the UK Singles Chart (Sony, 2003). The band is still going with original members Bambi and Peekaboo and a new member called Juice. A solo singer called Flick has also joined the group which is now known as F.A.T. (Flick and Tommi). Overlord X is credited with writing, producing and remixing a number of songs for artists such as Big Brovaz, Martine McCutcheon, Craig David, Peter Andre, Michelle Gayle, Beverley Knight and Aaron Soul. He went on to sign with Zomba Publishing.

== Discography ==
Overlord X:

- Weapon Is My Lyric (Mango, 1989) – UK No. 68
- X Versus the World (Mango, 1990)
- Come and Get Me (as B. Balogun) with Jah Shaka / Raggafunk (Mango, 1990)

With X-Posse:

- Project X (Mango, 1988)
