= Althea & Donna =

Jamaican reggae duo

- Origin: Kingston, Jamaica
- Genre: Reggae
- Years active: 1977–present (sporadic)
- Labels: Virgin, Lightning, Front Line, Caroline
- Past members: Althea Rose Forrest; Donna Marie Reid

Althea & Donna are a Jamaican reggae vocal duo, consisting of Althea Rose Forrest and Donna Marie Reid. They are best known for their 1977 single "Uptown Top Ranking", which was a number-one hit in the United Kingdom in 1978, making them the first Jamaican female duo to top the UK Singles Chart. Following the song's success, they became the first Jamaican female duo to be signed to a major record label.

== Early life ==
Althea Forrest grew up in Hughenden, St. Andrew, and attended Queens School. Donna Reid was raised in the Hope Road area of Kingston and attended St. Andrew High School for Girls. The two were school friends who began singing together on the streets of Kingston.

The duo was discovered by Jacob Miller, lead singer of Inner Circle, who encountered them singing on a Kingston sidewalk. Miller drove them to Joe Gibbs' studio at Retirement Crescent in Cross Roads to audition.

== Career ==
=== Breakthrough (1977–1978) ===
The Jamaican teenage singers Althea Forrest and Donna Reid – then 17 and 18 years old respectively – caused a chart surprise when their reggae song "Uptown Top Ranking" became a no. 1 hit in the UK Singles Chart in February 1978.

Producer Joe Gibbs, working with engineer Errol Thompson as the production duo known as the Mighty Two, had been seeking a female answer song to Trinity's 1977 hit "Three Piece Suit". The song's breakthrough came unexpectedly when BBC Radio 1 DJ John Peel accidentally played it on air, having intended to play the B-side, "Calico Suit" by the Mighty Two. The broadcast generated numerous listener requests, and Peel continued to champion the track. Despite spending 11 weeks on the charts, it enjoyed only a single week at the summit.

Following the song's success, Althea & Donna appeared on the BBC television programme Top of the Pops to promote the single. They toured the UK accompanied by Donna's father, as both singers were still teenagers at the time.

=== One Love Peace Concert ===
On 22 April 1978, Althea & Donna performed at the historic One Love Peace Concert at the National Stadium in Kingston. The concert, organized to promote peace between Jamaica's warring political factions, marked Bob Marley's return to Jamaica after 14 months in exile following an assassination attempt. Althea & Donna were among the early performers on the bill, appearing after The Meditations and before Dillinger.

=== Album and subsequent recordings ===
They released the album Uptown Top Ranking in 1978, backed by The Revolutionaries, on the Virgin Records subsidiary Front Line. The album was produced by Karl Pitterson. Tracks included "No More Fighting", "Jah Rastafari", "Make A Truce", "Oh Dread", "The West", "Jah Music", "If You Don't Love Jah", "Sorry", and "They Wanna Just".

The duo recorded several more singles with little success. In 2001, Caroline Records reissued the album, Uptown Top Ranking, with bonus tracks including "It Mek" (a previously unreleased outtake) and "Going to Negril" (a 1978 12-inch single).

=== Later career ===
After their initial period of activity in the late 1970s and early 1980s, Althea & Donna largely withdrew from the music industry. Forrest moved to New York and became an event planner, while Reid moved to Florida, where she works for the state government.

The duo has reunited for occasional performances. Their last major performance in Jamaica was at the Rebel Salute festival in January 2018, as part of the event's 25th anniversary celebration.

== Legacy ==
In 2020, "Uptown Top Ranking" was certified Silver by the British Phonographic Industry (BPI) for selling more than 200,000 digital copies in the UK.

Many artists have covered the song across various genres. Covers include versions by Black Box Recorder (1998), and Estelle with Joni Rewind.

== Discography ==
=== Albums ===
- Uptown Top Ranking (1978), Virgin/Front Line

=== Singles ===
- "Uptown Top Ranking" (1977), Lightning/Joe Gibbs/Warners (1978), Virgin
- "Love One Another" (1978), Lightning/Joe Gibbs/Warners
- "Puppy Dog Song" (1978), Front Line
- "Going to Negril" (1978), Front Line
- "Top Rankin" (1995), Ice Town Music

== See also ==
- List of one-hit wonders on the UK Singles Chart
- List of reggae musicians
- List of performers on Top of the Pops
- List of artists who reached number one on the UK Singles Chart
- Caribbean music in the United Kingdom
- One Love Peace Concert
