= John Moore (British musician) =

British musician (born 1964)

- Born: 23 December 1964 (age 61); Wokingham, Berkshire, England
- Genre: Alternative rock
- Occupation: Musician
- Instruments: Drums; guitar; saw
- Years active: 1986–present
- Labels: Blanco Y Negro; Chrysalis
- Website: Official Website

John Moore (born 23 December 1964) is a British musician, best known for his work as a guitarist and drummer in the Jesus and Mary Chain and as a member of Black Box Recorder.

== Biography ==
John Moore joined the Jesus and Mary Chain in 1986, succeeding Bobby Gillespie on drum duties, later moving to guitar. When he left the Jesus and Mary Chain in 1988, he formed John Moore & The Expressway, releasing two albums. He later formed a new band called Revolution 9 who released several singles, and one album, You Might as Well Live.

In 1997, he formed Black Box Recorder with Luke Haines and Sarah Nixey. The band released three studio albums: England Made Me, The Facts of Life and Passionoia, as well as a compilation The Worst of Black Box Recorder. The single "The Facts of Life" reached number 20 on the UK chart and the band appeared on Top of the Pops.

In 2005, he released an album, Half Awake on his own The Germ Organization label.

Following a 2007 collaboration with Art Brut and an appearance at the Nick Sanderson (Earl Brutus) tribute concert in October 2008, it was announced that Black Box Recorder would perform their first headlining gigs in five years during February 2009.

Moore is also known for his saw playing; he has played saw on both Art Brut albums, namely the 2007 single "Direct Hit". Moore also occasionally plays saw at Haines' concerts.

Moore has also contributed articles to British newspaper The Guardian, and also releases his own music through his Myspace page.

In the 1990s, Moore was at the forefront of the revival of interest in absinthe.

== Personal life ==
Moore was born in Wokingham, Berkshire and went to school at Wescott Road and later to The Forest School. From 2001 until 2006, Moore was married to Black Box Recorder vocalist Sarah Nixey, with whom he has one child.

== Discography ==
=== With the Jesus & Mary Chain ===
- "April Skies" (1987), Blanco y Negro
- "Happy When It Rains" (1987), Blanco y Negro

=== Solo/John Moore & the Expressway/The John Moore Rock & Roll Trio ===
- Expressway Rising LP/CD (1989), Polydor
- "Friends" 7-inch single (1989), Polydor
- "Out of My Mind" 12-inch single (1989), Polydor
- "Something About You Girl" single (1989), Polydor - UK #77
- Distortion LP/CD (1990), Polydor
- "Meltdown" 12-inch/CD (1990), Polydor
- Half Awake (2005), The Germ Organization
- Floral Tributes (2008), The Germ Organization
- Roll Your Activator (2009) John Moore Rock & Roll Trio (Covers Album), self-published
- Low-fi Lullabies (2013), The Germ Organization
- Knickerbocker Glory (2018), self-published
- It's Hell Out There (2019), self-published

=== With Revolution 9 ===
- "You Don't Know What Love Is" (1994), Acuarela Discos
- You Might as well Live (1994), Habana Productions
- "Living With You" (1995), Clawfist

=== With The Black Arts ===
- "Christmas Number One" (2007), Fantastic Plastic
