= Miloco Studios =

Recording studio management group in London

Coordinates: 51.4941°N 0.0829°W

Miloco Studios is a recording studio management group. Based in London, England, the company represents well over 160 facilities around the world.

== Background ==
Miloco was formed out of the merging of three former London recording studios: Milo Music, The Garden and Orinoco Studios.

=== Milo Music ===
Milo Music began in 1984 as a small studio in east London's Hoxton Square. The studio, commonly referred to as simply 'The Square' was used by the likes of Tricky, M People and the Brand New Heavies in the early years of its life. In the early nineties Milo took over another building nearby, using it to create seven programming suites that artists and producers, including pop producer Richard X and Swing Out Sister, could use for long-term periods. The Hoxton Square location served as Milo's headquarters up until 2000, when the company moved its offices to 36 Leroy Street and the studio was officially re-named The Square. It remained in operation until early 2016, when rising prices and gentrification of its Hoxton neighborhood forced its closure.

=== The Garden ===
The Garden, located on Holywell Lane in the Shoreditch area of East London, was built in 1981 by John Foxx and studio designer Andy Munro. It became a regular choice of studios for the likes of Siouxsie and the Banshees, the Cure and Depeche Mode, as well as Matt Johnson of the The who ended up buying the studio for himself. Milo Music became the studio's representative from the mid-1990s, when for the first time The Garden was run as a commercial enterprise, and the studio remained in operation until it was demolished in autumn 2013.

=== Orinoco Studios ===
Orinoco Studios, located at 36 Leroy Street in Elephant and Castle, was founded in the mid-1980s with two studios: The Engine Room and The Toyshop Programming Studio. They came to prominence in 1988 with the release of Enya's Orinoco-produced Watermark album, which included the hit "Orinoco Flow", apparently named after the studios. Orinoco was part of both the dance explosion of the late 1980s, and the indie and Britpop era of the early to mid-nineties. The studio's top-end Neve mix room (known as The Engine Room) has always been integral to Orinoco's appeal, and since the early 1990s bands such as Oasis and the Chemical Brothers mixed groundbreaking albums such as (What's the Story) Morning Glory? (1995) and Dig Your Own Hole (1997) respectively, in The Engine Room. Seven of the Chemical Brothers' albums have been mixed in the room, and the electronic act also regularly used The Toyshop programming room, which shares the same building as The Engine Room.

== History ==
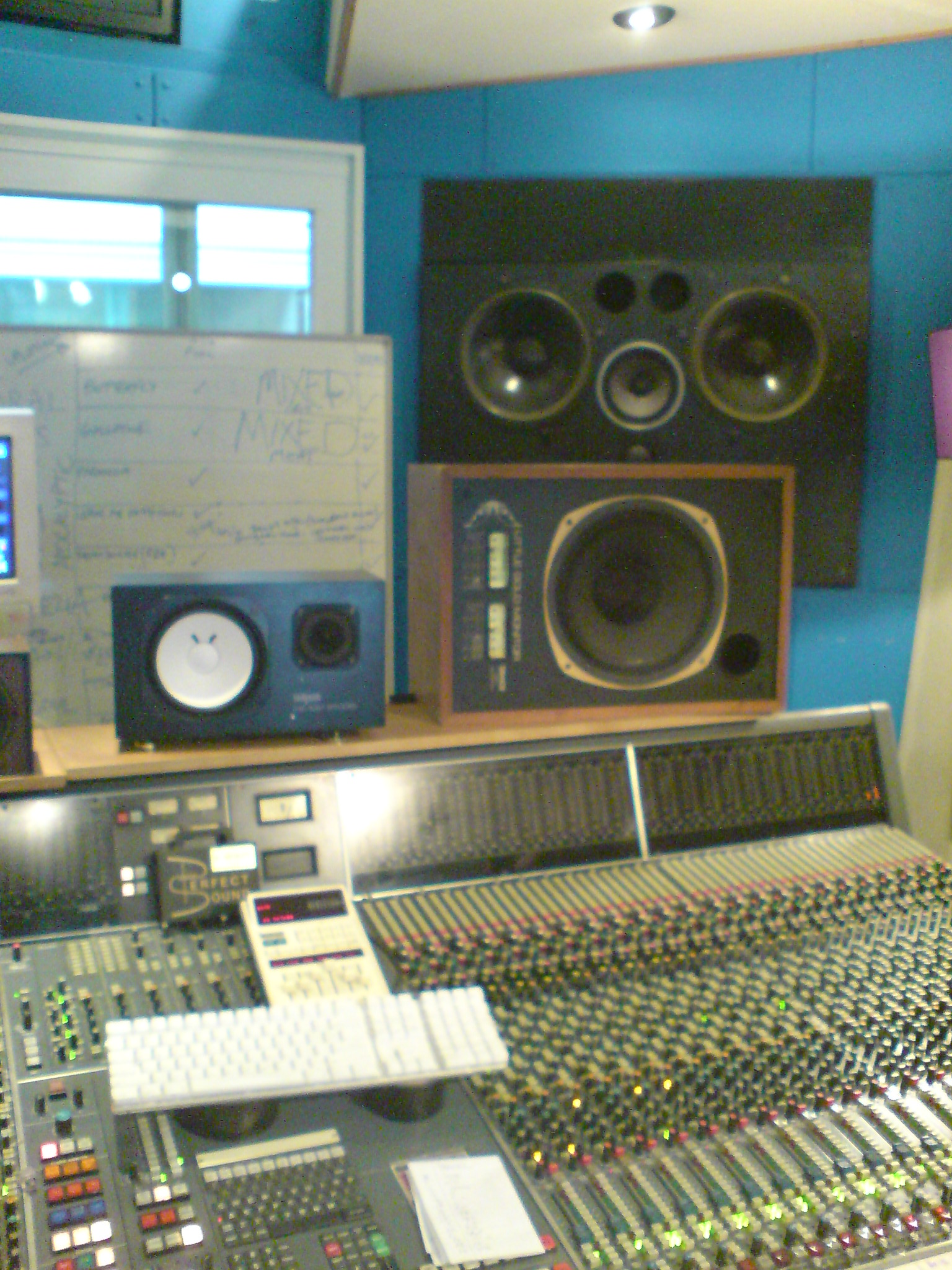
Munro M4 custom 4-way Soft Dome monitors in the Engine Room studio

In 2000, Milo Music bought Orinoco Studios and combined the two studios' names to create the Miloco name.

In 2006 Miloco opened three new studios. The first was the former Innovation Studios on Highbury Corner in North London, which was renamed 'The Yard' after Swan Yard, the road where it's located. The second was dance producer and DJ Pete Heller's Kentish Town studio, Musikbox, and the third was The Pool, producer Ben Hillier's unique live tracking studio built in the former Orinoco building.

In 2007 Miloco set up a sister company, Interface, a studio engineer and producer management company. The Interface roster currently manages the following UK-based engineers and producers: Pete Hofmann, Finn Eiles, Matt Hyde, Matt Foster, Ferg Peterkin, Joe Hirst and Ben Thackeray.

2007 and 2008 saw the company expand considerably further, forming partnerships with various established producers and recording artists to re-open a number of formerly private studios as commercial ones. The first room added during this expansion period was legendary producer Hugh Padgham's Sofa Sound Studios in West London, which Miloco took over in the summer of 2007.

At the start of 2008, Miloco unveiled its very first residential studio, El Cortijo, which was opened in partnership with studio owner and session drummer Trevor Morais. Based in a 7-bedroom Andalucian villa, El Cortijo became the first facility Miloco opened outside of the UK; however, the studio closed in 2013 and El Cortijo is now solely used as a luxury holiday villa. In summer 2008 Miloco collaborated with British producers and studio owners Flood and Alan Moulder to open a new tracking studio, Battery Studio 2, in their Battery Studios complex in Willesden Green, with their SSL mix studio, Battery Studio 1, also located at the Battery Studios Complex, coming under the Miloco umbrella in the summer of the following year.

In Autumn of 2008, Miloco developed its first UK residential studio facility when it assumed management of Fisher Lane Studios near the town of Guildford in Surrey. Since the early 1980s, the studio has been known for its association with bands and artists such as Genesis, Phil Collins, Eric Clapton, the Cure and Mike + The Mechanics. Under the new representation of Miloco, Fisher Lane was developed into the closest rural residential recording studio to London, having acquired two 4-bedroom cottages next-door to the studio.

In 2009, another rural residential facility near Brackley in Northamptonshire was made available for bookings via Miloco after the late producer and former Jamiroquai keyboardist Toby Smith converted two barn buildings into Angelic Studios. Set within Halse Copse Farm an hour north of London, Angelic has been described as "without question one of the finest residential recording spaces in the UK." Bands that have recorded at Angelic include Mumford & Sons, the Hoosiers, Everything Everything, and the 1975. The same year, Robbie Weston and Rick Dzendzera's The Bridge Facilities, originally located at No. 55 Great Marlborough Street in Soho, London, was closed after being sold to Miloco and reopened in the Orinoco Complex in 2012, where it was renamed The Bridge Writing Studio.

In 2015, The Engine Room studio was rebranded as The Red Room London. Shortly after, in early 2016, Miloco's first studio The Square located in Hoxton Square closed permanently. Three new studios were opened in September 2015: Bieger Sound in Berlin, Greystoke Studio in London and Grouse Lodge in Ireland.

Miloco Studios became popular amongst local London grime artists. In 2016 Skepta recorded and mixed his album Konnichiwa, which was awarded the Mercury Prize that same year. Emeli Sandé worked on her second album Long Live the Angels (2016) at Miloco as well. Sandé won Best Female at the 2017 BRIT Awards following the album's release.

== Artists ==
Well-known artists who have worked at Miloco studios include:

- Adele
- Alphabeat
- Arctic Monkeys
- Audio Bullys
- Badly Drawn Boy
- Beth Orton
- Björk
- Black Kids
- Bloc Party
- Coldplay
- Crashcarburn
- Crystal Castles
- Dizzee Rascal
- DJ Ironik
- DJ Shadow
- Editors
- Elastica
- Enya
- Everything but the Girl
- Florence and the Machine
- Foals
- Frank Carter & The Rattlesnakes
- Franz Ferdinand
- Funeral for a Friend
- Gallows
- Glasvegas
- Groove Armada
- Idlewild
- Jamie T
- Jarvis Cocker
- Kasabian
- Kate Nash
- Lannon
- Late of the Pier
- Liberty X
- The Long Blondes
- Luke Haines
- Madness
- Maisie Peters
- Mark Ronson
- Mystery Jets
- Nick Cave and the Bad Seeds
- Noel Gallagher
- Oasis
- Rachel Stevens
- Razorlight
- Roots Manuva
- Sam Smith
- Spiritualized
- Sugababes
- The Auteurs
- The Chemical Brothers
- The Futureheads
- The Horrors
- The Hours
- The Prodigy
- The Rascals
- These New Puritans
- Trivium
- Turin Brakes
- Twelfth Night
- Unkle
- Viva Brother

== Albums ==
=== 2008 Miloco albums include ===
- Bloc Party – Intimacy
- Sugababes – Catfights and Spotlights
- The King Blues – Save the World. Get the Girl
- Roll Deep – Return of the Big Money Sound
- Trivium – Shogun
- DJ Ironik – No Point in Wasting Tears
- Will Young – Let It Go
- The Metros – More Money Less Grief
- Slipknot – All Hope Is Gone
- Late of the Pier – Fantasy Black Channel
- Sparkadia – Postcards
- Black Kids – Partie Traumatic
- The Rascals – Rascalize
- Coldplay – Viva la Vida or Death and All His Friends
- The Music – Strength in Numbers
- Alphabeat – This Is Alphabeat
- Spiritualized – Songs in A&E
- Adem – Takes
- Hadouken! – Music for an Accelerated Culture
- Crystal Castles – Crystal Castles
- The Long Blondes – Couples
- Foals – Antidotes
- Mystery Jets – Twenty One
- Nick Cave and the Bad Seeds – Dig, Lazarus, Dig!!!
- Adele – 19
- These New Puritans – Beat Pyramid
- Bullet for My Valentine – Scream Aim Fire
- British Sea Power – Do You Like Rock Music?

=== Past Miloco albums include ===
- Kate Nash – Made of Bricks
- Arctic Monkeys – Favourite Worst Nightmare
- Newton Faulkner – Hand Built by Robots
- The Horrors – Strange House
- The Chemical Brothers – We Are the Night
- Shitdisco – Kingdom of Fear
- Roll Deep – Rules and Regulations
- The Maccabees – Colour It In
- Mr Hudson and the Library – A Tale of Two Cities
- Battle – Break the Banks
- Enya – Watermark
- Oasis – (What's the Story) Morning Glory?
- Ash – 1977
- The Chemical Brothers – Dig Your Own Hole
- Depeche Mode – Construction Time Again
- Roots Manuva – Awfully Deep
- Audio Bullys – Ego War
- The Cure – The Top
- M.I.A. – Arular
- Richard X – Richard X Presents His X-Factor Vol. 1
- The Auteurs – How I Learned to Love the Bootboys
- Gene – Olympian
- Jarvis Cocker - Jarvis
- Fionn Regan - The End of History
- Black Box Recorder - The Facts of Life
- Plan B - Who Needs Actions When You Got Words
- Shed Seven - Ladyman
- Luke Haines - Das Capital
- The 57th Dynasty - The Spoken Word
