= Luke Haines Is Alive and Well and Living in Buenos Aires =

Luke Haines Is Alive And Well And Living In Buenos Aires

Compilation album by Luke Haines
- Released: 29 September 2017
- Genre: Rock; electronic; alternative rock
- Length: 256:27
- Label: Cherry Red

Luke Haines Is Alive and Well and Living in Buenos Aires (subtitled Heavy, Frenz – The Solo Anthology 2001–2017) is a compilation album on 4 CDs by Luke Haines, featuring his solo work, released on 29 September 2017. The album covers his music from when he began his "righteous solo trip" in 1999, following the breakup of The Auteurs. On the final disc, the album contains rarities and un-released music (of the 21 tracks on it, 13 were previously unreleased).

== Critical reception ==
Professional ratings
Review scores
Source	Rating
Record Collector	5/5 stars
PopMatters	8/10
AllMusic	3.5/5 stars
The Line of Best Fit	8/10
Uncut	7/10

The album received positive reviews. Jake Kennedy of Record Collector, described Haines' voice and ambition as "unrivalled", noting his "seemingly infinite scope" of subject matter. Ian Rushbury in PopMatters noted the liner notes, but that despite the fact the album is fascinating for a music geek, for the average man in the street "who knows?", although that some songs feature curious instrumental choices, with "68p in My Pocket" lacking any drums, despite being a "slice of really nasty punk rock", with other songs featuring "inexplicable kazoo solos" where he felt an "acid rock guitar freakout" ought to have been.

Michael Hall, writing for The Line of Best Fit, described the album as drawing on Haines' prolific output, including, on the first disc, his "early, deeply unsettling, often hateful" early records, such as The Oliver Twist Manifesto, Das Capital, and 21st Century Man, as well as a "wide selection" from Off My Rocker at the Art School Bop; while saying the third disc covers "perhaps his most prolific years of output". Craig Chaligne of Louder Than War noted the "cheekily titled" final CD, which featured material from Haines' abandoned project "Property".

== Track listing ==
All tracks are written by Luke Haines.

CD1: Professional Rock ’n’ Roll (2001–2009)
No.	Title	Length
1.	"Discomania"	3:06
2.	"How to Hate the Working Classes"	3:36
3.	"England, Scotland and Wales"	3:31
4.	"The Oliver Twist Manifesto"	3:24
5.	"Never Work"	2:58
6.	"Death of Sarah Lucas"	2:46
7.	"The Mitford Sisters"	5:03
8.	"Satan Wants Me"	3:10
9.	"Bugger Bognor"	3:51
10.	"Off My Rocker at the Art School Bop (album version)"	3:29
11.	"Leeds United"	3:50
12.	"Country Life"	2:20
13.	"Bovver Boys"	3:03
14.	"Queen Elizabeth I"	3:42
15.	"All the English Devils"	3:41
16.	"The Walton Hop"	2:23
17.	"Bad Reputation (The Glitter Band)"	4:16
18.	"English Southern Man"	4:09
19.	"21st Century Man"	6:51

All tracks are written by Luke Haines.

CD2: Flanders: No Mans Land (2009–2013)
No.	Title	Length
1.	"Suburban Mourning"	4:09
2.	"Klaus Kinski"	4:08
3.	"Peter Hammill"	2:52
4.	"Russian Futurists Black Out the Sun"	3:09
5.	"Fag Break"	2:45
6.	"Inside the Restless Mind of Rollerball Rocco"	4:15
7.	"Gorgeous George"	3:41
8.	"Saturday Afternoon"	2:36
9.	"Big Daddy Got a Casio V L Tone"	2:31
10.	"Haystack’s in Heaven"	2:46
11.	"I’m Not the Man You Think I Am Karen, I’m the Actor Tony Allen"	3:58
12.	"The Morris Man Cometh"	2:18
13.	"Enoch Powell - Space Poet"	3:43
14.	"Rock ’n’ Roll Animals"	3:00
15.	"Magic Interlude 1"	0:39
16.	"Gene Vincent (Rock ’n’ Roll Mums and Rock ’n’ Roll Dads)"	3:43
17.	"A Badger Called Nick Lowe"	2:51
18.	"Angel of the North"	3:40
19.	"From Hersham to Heaven"	2:20
20.	"Rock ’n’ Roll Animals in Space"	3:20

All tracks are written by Luke Haines.

CD3: Unprofessional Rock ’n’ Roll. (2014–?)
No.	Title	Length
1.	"Lou Reed Lou Reed"	2:05
2.	"Alan Vega Says"	3:18
3.	"NY in the ’70s"	2:39
4.	"Bill's Bunker"	3:27
5.	"Dolls Forever"	2:31
6.	"Cerne Abbas Man"	4:10
7.	"Caravan Man"	2:01
8.	"Adventures in Dementia"	3:44
9.	"British Nuclear Bunkers"	3:32
10.	"Test Card Forever"	2:06
11.	"Pussy Willow (Kids’ Song)"	2:48
12.	"Cold Field Morning Under Bliss"	3:52
13.	"New Pagan Sun"	3:34
14.	"Ulrike Meinhof’s Brain Is Missing"	2:58
15.	"Bomber Jacket"	2:44
16.	"Marc Bolan Blues"	2:59
17.	"The Incredible String Band"	2:57
18.	"Smash the System"	2:39
19.	"Are You Mad?"	2:05

All tracks are written by Luke Haines.

CD4: Boners Disc: Hard On for Haines - Rarities & Unreleased
No.	Title	Length
1.	"Black Sun (early band demo)"	3:48
2.	"Property"	4:01
3.	"1963"	2:33
4.	"Dandification"	3:55
5.	"Bomber Harris"	2:36
6.	"Building for Britain in the ’70s"	6:50
7.	"Off My Rocker at the Art School Bop (Richard X single mix)"	3:40
8.	"I Am the Best Artist/Skinny White Girls"	4:32
9.	"Suburban Mourning (BBC session)"	3:36
10.	"Klaus Kinski (BBC session)"	3:43
11.	"21st Century Man (BBC Session)"	6:30
12.	"Me and the Birds"	2:52
13.	"This Is Outsider Music"	1:48
14.	"Natural Mystic Furry Freaks"	1:53
15.	"John Barleycorn Must Die"	4:46
16.	"Jeff Starship Superhero"	2:19
17.	"Electronic Tone Poem"	2:02
18.	"Hack Green"	2:46
19.	"Chris From the Stars"	2:29
20.	"68p in My Pocket"	1:12
21.	"Rave"	0:58
