= Das Capital (album) =

Studio album by Luke Haines
- Released: 21 July 2003
- Genre: Indie rock
- Length: 45:40
- Label: Hut Records
- Producer: Luke Haines & Pete Hoffman

Luke Haines chronology
The Oliver Twist Manifesto (2001)	Das Capital (2003)	Luke Haines is Dead (2005)

Das Capital is a 2003 album released by British singer/songwriter Luke Haines. The album features orchestral re-recordings of some of his older songs from The Auteurs and Baader Meinhof periods, along with some new tracks.

== Reception ==
Professional ratings
Review scores
Source	Rating
AllMusic	4/5 stars
Gigwise	1/10 stars
Pitchfork	5.1/10
Uncut	2/5 stars

Das Capital was met with mixed reviews from critics.

== Track listing ==
All tracks by Luke Haines.

Das Capital track listing
No.	Title	Originally recorded for	Length
0.	"Das Capital Overture" (pregap medley)	N/A	4:58
1.	"How Could I Be Wrong"	New Wave (1993)	4:33
2.	"Showgirl"	New Wave	4:16
3.	"Baader Meinhof"	Baader Meinhof (1996)	3:03
4.	"Lenny Valentino"	Now I'm a Cowboy (1994)	2:16
5.	"Starstruck"	New Wave	3:32
6.	"Satan Wants Me"	Previously unreleased	3:09
7.	"Unsolved Child Murder"	After Murder Park (1996)	2:26
8.	"Junk Shop Clothes"	New Wave	2:46
9.	"The Mitford Sisters"	Previously unreleased	5:02
10.	"Bugger Bognor"	Previously unreleased	3:50
11.	"Future Generation"	How I Learned to Love the Bootboys (1999)	3:34

== Personnel ==
- Jo Archard - Violin
- James Banbury - Cello, Orchestration
- Andrew Cotterill - Photography
- Alison Dodds - Violin
- Steve Double - Photography
- Vincent Greene - Viola
- Luke Haines - Guitar, Piano, Vocals, Producer, Liner Notes, Omnichord, Orchestration, String Arrangements, String Ensemble
- Pete Hofmann - Producer, Engineer, Orchestration, String Arrangements, Mixing
- Everton Nelson - Violin
- Tim Weller - Percussion, Drums
- Tim Young - Mastering
