= Outsider / In: The Collection =

Compilation album by Luke Haines
- Released: 2012
- Genre: Rock; electronic; alternative rock
- Length: 123:20
- Label: Music Club Deluxe

Outsider / In: The Collection is a compilation album by Luke Haines, also featuring materials from his time in The Auteurs and as Baader Meinhof, on 2 CDs. It was released in 2012.

== Critical reception ==
Professional ratings
Review scores
Source	Rating
Record Collector	4/5 stars
Pitchfork	7.2/10
Drowned in Sound	9/10

The album received generally positive reviews. Jaime Gill, writing for the BBC, described Haines as one of England’s greatest songwriters, but that most of his early brilliance had been delivered under The Auteurs, while Nick Neyland, writing for Pitchfork, described him as a complex character, and noted the cover was "hideous", but perhaps it was a deliberate artistic choice. The inclusion of two tracks from The Auteurs vs μ-Ziq was noted as a strange choice. The inclusion of only one song from How I Learned to Love the Bootboys was noted as "disappointing".

== Track listing ==
All tracks are written by Luke Haines.

CD1
No.	Title	Length
1.	"Show Girl"	4:08
2.	"How Could I Be Wrong"	3:54
3.	"Lenny Valentino"	2:19
4.	"The Upper Classes"	6:47
5.	"New French Girlfriend"	4:17
6.	"Daughter of a Child"	6:11
7.	"Back With the Killer Again"	2:44
8.	"Light Aircraft of Fire"	2:19
9.	"Tombstone"	4:01
10.	"Child Brides"	4:29
11.	"Unsolved Child Murder"	2:07
12.	"Underground Movies"	5:22
13.	"Chinese Bakery"	3:07
14.	"I'm a Rich Man's Toy"	2:55
15.	"Valet Parking"	2:56
16.	"Starstruck"	3:01
17.	"Home Again"	3:25
18.	"Subculture"	2:14

All tracks are written by Luke Haines.

CD2
No.	Title	Length
1.	"Baader Meinhof"	3:04
2.	"Back on the Farm"	3:55
3.	"The Rubettes"	3:29
4.	"England Scotland and Wales"	3:31
5.	"Discomania"	3:06
6.	"The Spook Manifesto"	5:46
7.	"The Oliver Twist Manifesto"	3:24
8.	"The Mitford Sisters"	5:03
9.	"Das Capital Overture"	4:58
10.	"England vs America"	2:44
11.	"Death of Sarah Lucas"	2:46
12.	"What Happens When We Die"	2:09
13.	"In the Bleak Midwinter"	3:28
14.	"Get Wrecked at Home"	3:14
15.	"There's Gonna Be an Accident"	3:26
16.	"GSG 29"	3:00
