= Meinhof =

Meinhof (lit. 'my farmyard') is a German surname. Notable people with the surname include:

- Carl Meinhof (1857–1944), German linguist
- Ulrike Meinhof (1934–1976), West German journalist, author, left-wing militant, co-founder of the Red Army Faction, daughter of Werner
- Ulrike Hanna Meinhof, professor and Chair of Cultural Studies at the University of Bradford
- Werner Meinhof (1901–1940), German historian, brother of Carl

== See also ==
- Baader-Meinhof (disambiguation)
