= Paul Miller (theatre director) =

English theatre director

Paul Miller (born c.1968) was the artistic director of the Orange Tree Theatre in Richmond, London from 2014 to 2022, succeeding the theatre's founder, Sam Walters. In November 2024 it was announced that he would become transitional Executive Director of Stage Directors UK.

== Early life ==
The son of a driving instructor, Miller grew up in Chichester.

== Career ==
Between 2009 and 2014 he was an Associate Director at Sheffield Theatres, where his productions included Wonderful Tennessee by Brian Friel, The Winter’s Tale by William Shakespeare, The Daughter-in-Law by DH Lawrence, Democracy by Michael Frayn (which transferred to The Old Vic Theatre), Hamlet with John Simm, and True West by Sam Shepard.

For the National Theatre he has directed The History Boys (revival for the West End and UK tour), Baby Girl by Roy Williams, DNA by Dennis Kelly, The Miracle by Lin Coghlan, The Enchantment by Victoria Benedictsson, Sing Yer Heart Out for the Lads by Roy Williams in the Cottesloe, and The Associate by Simon Bent in The Loft.

Other work includes Elling, adapted by Simon Bent (Trafalgar Studios); The History Boys (Center Theatre Group, LA); Total Eclipse by Christopher Hampton (Menier Chocolate Factory); French Without Tears by Terence Rattigan (English Touring Theatre); Not the Love I Cry For by Robin Hooper (Arcola); A Life in the Theatre by David Mamet (Setagaya Public Theatre, Japan); Sugar Sugar, Goldhawk Road, Bad Company by Simon Bent and Kingfisher Blue by Lin Coghlan (Bush Theatre), Mercy by Lin Coghlan (Soho); The Marriage of Figaro (English Touring Opera at Hackney Empire); Mean Tears by Peter Gill, Accomplices by Simon Bent and Mr England by Richard Bean (Sheffield Theatres); Honeymoon Suite by Richard Bean (Royal Court); Fragile Land by Tanika Gupta (Hampstead); Four Knights in Knaresborough by Paul Webb (UK tour); A Penny for a Song by John Whiting (Oxford Stage Company/Whitehall Theatre); Tragedy: A Tragedy by Will Eno (Gate); Hushabye Mountain by Jonathan Harvey (ETT/Hampstead); Rosmersholm by Henrik Ibsen (Southwark Playhouse) and The Robbers by Friedrich Schiller (Latchmere).

== Productions ==
Paul Miller's productions at the Orange Tree Theatre include:

- The Widowing of Mrs Holroyd by DH Lawrence, September 2014
- Widowers' Houses by Bernard Shaw, December 2014
- Each His Own Wilderness by Doris Lawrence, April 2015
- French Without Tears by Terence Rattigan, October 2015, revived June 2016 before UK tour
- The Philanderer by Bernard Shaw, June–July 2016
- Sheppey by Somerset Maugham, November 2016
- The Lottery of Love by Pierre Marivaux, translated by John Fowles, March 2017
- Poison by Lot Vekemans, November 2017
- Misalliance by Bernard Shaw, December 2017
- Candida by Bernard Shaw, 2019–20
- While the Sun Shines by Terence Rattigan, 2019, revived 2021

== Publications ==
- Miller, Paul (30 June 2014). "Theatre of the forgotten? It's time to breathe new life into old talent". The Guardian: Theatre blog with Lyn Gardner.
