= Christie Malry's Own Double-Entry (film) =

- Directed by: Paul Tickell
- Screenplay by: Simon Bent
- Based on: Christie Malry's Own Double-Entry by B. S. Johnson
- Produced by: Kees Kasander
- Starring: Nick Moran; Kate Ashfield; Neil Stuke; Shirley Ann Field; Marcello Mazzarella; Mattia Sbragia; Francesco Giuffrida
- Cinematography: Reinier van Brummelen
- Edited by: Chris Wyatt
- Music by: Luke Haines
- Production companies: Delux Productions; Kasander Film Company; Movie Masters; Woodline Films Ltd
- Distributed by: Vine International Pictures
- Release dates: 7 December 2000 (Netherlands); 16 August 2002 (United Kingdom)
- Running time: 109 minutes
- Countries: United Kingdom; Netherlands; Luxembourg
- Languages: English; Italian
- Budget: c.£2m

Christie Malry's Own Double-Entry is a 2000 film directed by Paul Tickell from a screenplay by Simon Bent, based on the 1973 novel of the same name by B. S. Johnson.

It stars Nick Moran as Christie Malry, an accounts clerk in contemporary London who uses the system of double-entry bookkeeping as a way to compensate himself for perceived injustices inflicted upon him by society, committing what he deems to be equivalent acts of revenge that begin with petty acts of vandalism but soon escalate to full-on terror attacks.

== Plot ==
Christie Malry is twenty-something male who lives in West London with his terminally ill mother and works in an office, a job he finds unfulfilling and so distracts himself from the boredom by having violent fantasies in which he threatens his manager with a shotgun. At the suggestion of his friend Bernie he takes a night class in accountancy, where he is introduced to the theories and teachings of Fra Luca Pacioli, an early pioneer in the field of accounting and the author of Summa de arithmetica, one of the first books on the practice of double-entry bookkeeping. Christie then resigns from his job and, shortly afterwards, Bernie is killed in a vehicle collision.

Interspersed with the main story are scenes set in Renaissance Milan in which Fra Luca Pacioli is seen teaching his theories on accountancy at the court of Ludovico Sforza. In addition, Leonardo da Vinci is employed there, and these scenes also follow his struggles as he challenges what he sees as interference into his artistic vision from the Catholic Church, against a backdrop of an imminent invasion by the French army.

As Christie continues his accountancy studies and learns that debits must be cancelled out with credits he begins to ponder whether the same principles should apply to his actual life, wondering who will credit him for his mother's cancer. He then starts a job at Tapper's chocolate factory, where he meets Headlam, an eccentric co-worker whom he becomes friends with, and shortly afterwards hits upon the idea of using double-entry bookkeeping as a method of recording perceived wrongs made against him by society then cancelling them out by committing what he deems to be equivalent acts of revenge. Following the motto 'for every debit there must be a credit', he keeps detailed notes of such transactions in a ledger he carries with him, explaining his new system to his mother moments before she dies.

Christie's initial attempts at balancing out the supposed injustices against him start with him committing petty acts of vandalism, such as running a key along the paintwork of a car whose owner had sounded its horn at him or throwing a brick through the window of an off licence he believed had sold his mother bootleg alcohol, along with causing trouble for his employer by discarding letters of complaint sent to the company and, in addition to starting a new job, he enters into a relationship with Carol, a girl he meets at his local butcher's shop.

However, from this point on Christie's acts of revenge become increasingly serious before gravitating to full-on acts of terrorism: he phones the police claiming to have planted a bomb in Leicester Square then, when the Foreign Secretary dies of a heart attack he makes another phone call in which he claims he was responsible. Not knowing who the true perpetrator is, the British government blames Iraq for his activities and begins to escalate military action in retaliation. Christie now gravitates to actual violence, taking advice from sources such as The Anarchist Cookbook and blowing up a local tax office by placing a home-made bomb in a toy train and sending it through a tunnel adjacent to the building. He then kills over twenty thousand people by poisoning a reservoir in West London, another attack that is blamed on Iraq and leads to air strikes being launched against the country.

At this point Carol receives a visit from the police telling her that Christie is in hospital as the result of a bomb exploding on a bus he was travelling on, which is initially blamed on an Irish passenger. Christie is fatally wounded and dies in hospital with Carol by his side. However, when Carol returns to his flat she goes inside the spare room that he never let her enter and discovers it contains extensive details of his plan to bomb the Houses of Parliament, and it is revealed that he was in fact carrying a bomb with the intention of doing this when it went off prematurely, exploding as the bus crossed Westminster Bridge.

== Cast ==
- Nick Moran as Christie
- Neil Stuke as Headlam
- Kate Ashfield as Carol
- Mattia Sbragia as Leonardo da Vinci
- Marcello Mazzarella as Pacioli
- Francesco Giuffrida as Salai
- Shirley Anne Field as Mary, the Mother of Christie
- Sergio Albelli as Duke Ludovico
- Salvatorre Lazzaro as Giacomo
- Peter Sullivan as Wagner
- Tabitha Wady as Lucy
- Mel Raido as Bernie

== Soundtrack ==
The soundtrack, released on 11 June 2001 on Hut Records, was written and performed by Luke Haines, who also co-produced it with Pete Hofman. It included a cover of Nick Lowe's I Love the Sound of Breaking Glass. In the DVD commentary, Tickell and Moran discuss how Billie Piper was considered to perform the vocal on this song as she wished to work with Luke Haines, though this ultimately did not happen.

== Production ==
Filming took place in late 1999; in an interview with Moran by Jan Moir in The Daily Telegraph on the 23rd of December he mentioned he was in the middle of making the film and that he was foregoing pudding because he had 'five pages of nude scenes next week.' This means that the film was made at the exact time during which it is set, as Christie's gravestone at the end of the film shows that he died on 13 December 1999.

Despite being set in London and featuring a largely British cast, director Paul Tickell said in an interview that the film had no actual funding from Britain and bemoaned the state of the UK film industry: 'There's not a penny of the British Film industry in Malry. In spite of the relative success of the film I can't see me making a film with anyone in the British Film industry at the moment.' Funding was instead raised in Luxembourg and the Netherlands, where much of the scenes were also filmed.

A number of London locations and landmarks can be seen in the film, including Hammersmith Bridge (which is also mentioned in the novel and is close to where author BS Johnson grew up), Westminster Bridge and the London Eye. However, in the DVD commentary, Tickell and Moran discuss how most of the film was shot in Luxembourg, including the scene at a hydro-electric plant where Christie poisons London's water supply, and how precautions often had to be made to disguise the true locations, such as getting traffic outside a pub to drive on the left side of the road as the characters walked in to make it look like it was in the UK.

== Release ==
Despite production beginning in late 1999 the film did not receive a full release until 2002, with the film being screened in several UK cinemas including the Prince Charles Cinema followed by a Q&A session with the director and lead actors; Paul Tickell referred to the 'guerrilla distribution' of the film coming about as a result of the film struggling to find a distributor until the release of the soundtrack sparked interest in the film amongst critics and, as a result, 'some screenings were arranged. Journalists loved it and then they reviewed it. That helped to get the ball rolling.'

The film received its UK premiere on 15 August 2002 at the Institute of Contemporary Arts, London.

== Reception ==
=== Critical response ===
A number of reviews of the film were very positive, with The Sunday Times calling it "brilliantly black and British", "Superb on every level" and concluding "If you don't like this, stop going to the cinema."

Uncut made it their film of the month and later said it was "shamefully under-promoted by the British film industry".

Kevin Jackson in The Independent praised it as a "brilliant British film about mass murder and, er, bookkeeping" and "a genuinely original, ambitious and wonderfully entertaining new British film" whilst expressing disappointment with the problems the producers had in finding a distributor, as its "hybrid nature" (such as the scenes set in 16th century Italy) had made it hard to classify and therefore market.

William Thomas, writing for Empire, was also positive, awarding the film four stars and praising Tickell's use of "striking visuals" to "illustrate his Kubrickian attack on the injustice of society" and adding that "Moran gives an impressive turn as the titular (anti)hero."

Peter Bradshaw, in the Guardian, however, gave the film two out of five stars, writing that "Paul Tickell directs in the punky, bloody-minded spirit of Derek Jarman and Lindsay Anderson" but going on to say that it "can't decide if it's a period-piece about the shabby filing-clerk world of the 1960s, or an up-to-the-minute 21st century world of computer laptops" and criticising the "tatty and depressing Britishness of the film".

Bradshaw went on to criticise the Renaissance-set scenes, calling them "a double-entry narrative device which doesn't however cast much light on Christie", something echoed by Philip French in The Observer, who wrote that Tickell had "misguidedly turned a few hints from the novel about the activities of Luca Bartolomeo Pacioli, the Renaissance monk who invented double-entry book-keeping, into a parallel plot" though he also called it "an ambitious, intermittently effective movie". Tom Charity, writing in Time Out made a similar point, saying "your reviewer is bound to confess that algebraic theory might be considered less compelling than the misadventures of our would-be-accountant", but otherwise praised its "low budget ingenuity" and called it a "brave, risky adaptation".

=== Accolades ===
At the 56th British Academy Film Awards, held in 2003, writer Simon Bent was nominated in the BAFTA Award for Outstanding Debut by a British Writer, Director or Producer category but lost out to Asif Kapadia for The Warrior.

Luke Haines received a nomination for Best Music at the 2001 British Independent Film Awards, and at the same ceremony the following year the film won the award for Most Effective Distribution Campaign

== Differences between the novel and the film ==
=== Setting ===
The book and film are both set contemporarily to when they were released, so whilst the novel is set in the early 1970s the film is set in 1999, and Christie's ledger includes cultural references such as Oasis, Ben Elton, The Simpsons and Chris Morris, along with Christie's gravestone showing he dies in December of that year.

=== Characters ===
In the novel Christie's girlfriend is simply referred to as 'the Shrike', whereas in the film she is called Carol. In the DVD commentary Tickell explained this was part of them making the character more rounded than in the book. In addition, the character of Bernie does not exist in the book.

=== Plot ===
The film largely follows the same storyline as the novel though there are a number of differences, with the biggest one being that the novel ends abruptly when Christie is diagnosed with late-stage terminal cancer and dies of related pneumonia, whereas in the film he is killed when a bomb he is taking to detonate at the Houses of Parliament goes off unexpectedly, exploding as he carries it on a bus across Westminster Bridge and killing him, with the bombing being attributed to the IRA. His bereaved girlfriend, however, does learn of his involvement at the end of the film.

The scenes in which Iraq is held responsible for Christie's crimes and punished with retaliatory air strikes do not appear in the book, and are somewhat prophetic seeing as how the film was made in late 1999, over three years before the 2003 Invasion of Iraq. This was noted in a review by Studio International, which praised the film's 'prescience, subject matter and intelligence' for pre-emptively addressing issues such as the attacks on Iraq, domestic terrorism and financial crises.

=== Stylistic differences ===
The novel features a number of metafictional elements (in line with the author's belief that the novel was an outdated and limited artform) that are not reproduced in the film, such as how BS Johnson's narrator visits Christie in hospital but has his visit cut short when 'the nurses then suggested I leave, not knowing who I was, that he could not die without me', the way a number of characters including Christie are aware they are appearing in a novel, such as when he is asked by his employer why he did not schedule his mother's funeral a day later than he did replies 'There wasn't any more time. It's a short novel' or how he ponders on his deathbed whether his cancer 'may have been caused through those misshapes I had on page 67!' In addition, whilst the book features quotes from Luca Pacioli, the scenes depicting him are an invention of the film.
