= Break the Bank =

Break the Bank may refer to:

- Breaking the bank, a gambling term
- Breaking the Bank, a 2014 British comedy film

== Game shows ==
- Break the Bank (1945 game show), 1945 radio show which transitioned to (and sometimes co-existed with) television in 1948
- Break the Bank (1976 game show), hosted by Tom Kennedy and later by Jack Barry
- Break the Bank (1985 game show), hosted by Gene Rayburn and later by Joe Farago
- Kabarkada, Break the Bank, a 2000s Philippine game show

== Music ==
- Break the Banks, a 2007 LP from the band Battle
- "Break the Bank" (song), by Schoolboy Q from his album Oxymoron
- "Break the Bank" song from Golden Era
