= Art Will Save the World =

Irish documentary film

- Directed by: Niall McCann
- Written by: Niall McCann
- Produced by: Clare Ridge
- Starring: Luke Haines
- Cinematography: Matthew Kirrane
- Edited by: Declan McGrath
- Production companies: Happy Endings Productions, Irish Film Board
- Release date: 6 August 2012
- Running time: 70 minutes
- Country: Ireland
- Language: English

Art Will Save the World is a 2012 documentary about English musician Luke Haines, formerly of The Auteurs and Black Box Recorder. It explores Haines' career in the music industry, with interviews and commentary.

== Production ==
The film was funded by the Irish Film Board, produced by Happy Ending Productions, and directed by Niall McCann. It features Jarvis Cocker, John Niven, Arthur Matthews, Grant Gee, David Peace, and Stewart Home. Michael Pattison wrote that the split-screens and freeze frames evoked Jean-Luc Godard, and that 'arbitrary minutiae' appearing intermittently on screen aided in establishing context comically. Haines himself featured in the role of an 'unreliable narrator', discussing his life as a perennial outsider to the broader British music scene.

== Release ==
It premiered on the 6th of July 2012, at the East End Film Festival in London, with a Q&A with Haines and McCann afterwards. It was also screened at the Irish Film Festival London 2013.
