= Christie Malry's Own Double Entry OST =

Soundtrack album by Luke Haines
- Released: 11 June 2001
- Genre: Soundtrack
- Length: 45:40
- Label: Hut Records
- Producer: Luke Haines & Pete Hofmann

Luke Haines chronology
Christie Malry's Own Double Entry OST (2001)	The Oliver Twist Manifesto (2001)

Christie Malry's Own Double Entry by Luke Haines is the soundtrack to the film of the same name, based on a novel by B. S. Johnson and directed by Paul Tickell. The album includes a cover of the Nick Lowe song "I Love the Sound of Breaking Glass" from Lowe's Jesus of Cool album.

== Reception ==
Professional ratings
Review scores
Source	Rating
AllMusic	4/5 stars
Drowned in Sound	8/10
The Guardian	3/5 stars
NME	4/5 stars

Christie Malry's Own Double Entry OST was met with favourable reviews from music critics.

== Track listing ==
1. "Discomania" – 3:06
2. "In the Bleak Midwinter" – 3:28
3. "How to Hate the Working Classes" – 3:35
4. "The Ledger" – 2:17
5. "Bernie's Funeral/Auto Asphixiation" – 2:18
6. "Discomaniax" – 4:31
7. "Alchemy" – 2:28
8. "Art Will Save the World" – 1:58
9. "I Love the Sound of Breaking Glass" (Nick Lowe/Andrew Bodnar/Steve Goulding) – 7:03
10. "England Scotland and Wales" – 3:30
11. "Celestial Discomania" – 4:26
12. "Essexmania" – 6:56

== Personnel ==
- James Banbury – Cello, Programming
- Luke Haines – Vocals, Multi Instruments, Producer
- Pete Hofmann – Producer, Engineer, Mixing
- Tim Weller – Drums
- Winchester Cathedral Choir – Performer
