= South Will Rise Again =

South Will Rise Again may refer to:

- "South Will Rise Again", an episode of the television series Preacher
- The South Will Rise Again, a book by J. T. Edson
- "The South Will Rise Again", a song by The Auteurs from the album How I Learned to Love the Bootboys

== See also ==
- Neo-Confederatism, a movement that seeks to re-establish the Confederate States of America
- Lost Cause of the Confederacy, a discredited historical outlook on the American Civil War
