= Fear of flying (disambiguation) =

A fear of flying is a fear of air travel.

Fear of Flying may also refer to:

- Fear of Flying (novel), a 1973 novel by Erica Jong
- "Fear of Flying" (The Simpsons), a 1994 episode of the animated television series The Simpsons
- "Fear of Flying", a 1992 segment of the animated television show Tom & Jerry Kids
- Turbulence 2: Fear of Flying, the 1999 sequel to the movie Turbulence
- "(No More) Fear of Flying" a 1979 single and album by Gary Brooker
- Fear of Flying (album), a 2000 album by Mýa
- "Fear of Flying", a song by The Auteurs from their 1996 album After Murder Park
- "Fear of Flying", a song by Teenage Fanclub from their 1993 album Thirteen
- "Fear of Flying", a song by Bowery Electric
- "Fear of Flying", a song by Kimberly Caldwell
- "Fear of Flying", a song by Vitamin C from her 1999 album Vitamin C
- Fear of Flying, a disbanded British indie rock band (members now make up White Lies)
- Fear of Flying, an episode of the British television sitcom So What Now?
