= Luke Haines Is Dead =

Luke Haines is Dead

Compilation album by Luke Haines
- Released: 18 July 2005
- Recorded: ?
- Genre: Indie rock
- Length: 3 Hours 22 Mins
- Label: EMI
- Producer: Luke Haines, Pete Hoffman & Phil Vinall

Luke Haines chronology
Das Capital (2003)	Luke Haines is Dead (2005)	Off My Rocker at the Art School Bop (2006)

Professional ratings
Review scores
Source	Rating
Allmusic	link

Luke Haines is Dead is a three-disc boxed set containing various rarities, remixes, b-sides, unreleased material and classic tracks from The Auteurs, Baader Meinhof and Haines' solo work.

== Track listing ==
=== Disc one ===
1. "Das Capital Overture" – 4:33
2. "Bailed Out (Unreleased single)" – 4:16
3. "Showgirl" – 3:03
4. "Glad to Be Gone (B-Side)" – 2:16
5. "Staying Power (B-Side)" – 3:32
6. "Junk Shop Clothes (BBC session)" – 3:09
7. "She Might Take a Train (Limited edition single)" – 2:26
8. "Subculture (Limited edition single)" – 2:46
9. "Government Bookstore (BBC session)" – 5:02
10. "Housebreaker (Acoustic version)" – 3:50
11. "Valet Parking (Acoustic version)" – 3:34
12. "How Could I be Wrong" (Single version) – 4:33
13. "Starstruck (Live acoustic)" – 4:16
14. "Home Again Live acoustic)" – 3:03
15. "American Guitars" – 2:16
16. "Wedding Day (B-Side)" – 3:32
17. "High Diving Horses (B-Side)" – 3:09
18. "Lenny Valentino (Single recording)" – 2:26
19. "Disneyworld (B-Side)" – 2:46
20. "I'm a Rich Man's Toy" – 5:02

=== Disc two ===
1. "The Upper Classes (BBC session)" – 4:33
2. "Everything You Say Will Destroy You (BBC session)" – 4:16
3. "A Sister Like You" – 3:03
4. "Underground Movies (Alternate recording/French single)" – 2:16
5. "Brainchild (Alternate recording/French single)" – 3:32
6. "Chinese Bakery (BBC session)" – 3:09
7. "Modern History (B-Side)" – 2:26
8. "New French Girlfriend (BBC session)" – 2:46
9. "Light Aircraft On Fire (Single recording)" – 5:02
10. "Carcrash (B-Side)" – 3:50
11. "X Boogie Man (B-Side)" – 3:34
12. "New Brat In Town (Unreleased version) – 4:33
13. "Tombstone (Unreleased version)" – 4:16
14. "Back With The Killer Again (EP track)" – 3:03
15. "Unsolved Child Murder" – 2:16
16. "Former Fan (EP Track)" – 3:32
17. "Kenneth Anger's Bad Dream (EP track)" – 3:09
18. "Kids' Issue (BBC session/EP track)" – 2:46
19. "A New Life, A New Family (BBC session/EP track)" – 5:02
20. "Buddha (BBC session/EP track)" – 2:46
21. "After Murder Park (BBC session/EP track)" – 5:02

=== Disc three ===
1. "Baader Meinhof" – 4:33
2. "Meet Me At The Airport" – 4:16
3. "I've Been A Fool For You (Ltd Edition)" – 3:03
4. "Accident (Fuse remix)" – 2:16
5. "Mogadishu (Dalai Lama remix)" – 3:32
6. "ESP Kids (Unreleased)" – 3:09
7. "Future Generation (Unreleased version)" – 2:26
8. "Politic (Unreleased)" – 2:46
9. "Johnny and The Hurricanes (Bootboys out-take/Unreleased)" – 5:02
10. "The Rubettes" – 3:50
11. "Breaking Up Is Hard To Do (B-Side)" – 3:34
12. "Get Wrecked At Home (B-Side)" – 4:33
13. "Essex Bootboys (Bootboys Out-Take/Unreleased)" – 4:16
14. "Discomania (Alternate version/Unreleased)" – 3:03
15. "Couple Dancing (Unreleased)" – 2:16
16. "How To Hate The Working Classes" – 3:32
17. "The Oliver Twist Manifesto (Unreleased version)" – 3:09
18. "Never Work" – 2:26
19. "Skin Tight (From Film Showboy/Unreleased)" – 2:46
20. "Satan Wants Me" – 5:02
21. "The Mitford Sisters" – 2:46
22. "Bugger Bognor" – 5:02
