= Bad Vibes: Britpop and My Part in Its Downfall =

2009 book by Luke Haines

- Author: Luke Haines
- Publisher: Windmill
- Publication date: 2009
- Pages: 272
- ISBN: 978-0-099-52226-3

Bad Vibes: Britpop and My Part in Its Downfall is an partly autobiographic book by English musician and author Luke Haines, published in 2009.

== Overview ==
Ten years prior, Haines had been working on a fictional book, and following a disagreement with his record label, a publisher contacted him to write a book, which soon became Bad Vibes. Louise Wener referred to Haines as being driven by a "biblical desire for revenge", fuelled by a feeling he ought to have been more successful.

Described as a "ripping account of the 1990s Britpop scene", and the "first picaresque music autobiography", the book is a somewhat exaggerated account of Haine's life in music in the 1990s, covering his "truculence and tribulations". In the introduction, Haines brands himself a "recovering egomaniac" and "unashamed elitist". The book covers Haines' perspective on what he felt were the "false idols" of the time, and their taking of what he describes as "his rightful position in the mainstream". In this vein, he brands Blur as "habitual bandwagon jumpers", and to their lead singer Damon Albarn he passes the epitaph of being the "Adolf Hitler of Britpop" (which he himself had been described as; he instead compares himself to Albert Speer), Thom Yorke of Radiohead as being the "most heinous of creatures". James Banbury, Haine's former bandmate in the Auteurs, is never referred to by name in the book, and is instead called "the cellist".

Novelist David Peace described the book as being "part Oswald Spengler, part Spike Milligan".
