= Now I'm a Cowboy =

Studio album by the Auteurs
- Released: 9 May 1994
- Recorded: 1993–1994
- Studio: Townhouse (London); Protocol (London); Milo (London)
- Genre: Alternative rock; indie pop; baroque pop
- Length: 41:42
- Label: Hut
- Producer: Phil Vinall; Luke Haines

The Auteurs chronology
| New Wave (1993) | Now I'm a Cowboy (1994) | After Murder Park (1996) |

Now I'm a Cowboy is the second album by British rock band the Auteurs, released on 9 May 1994 by Hut Records. It includes the singles "Lenny Valentino" and "Chinese Bakery", both of which reached the top 50 of the UK singles chart.

On 2 June 2014 Now I'm a Cowboy was reissued alongside the subsequent Auteurs albums After Murder Park (1996) and How I Learned to Love the Bootboys (1999). The reissue features unreleased songs and liner notes written by band frontman Luke Haines. It was released through 3 Loop Music.

== Background ==
The Auteurs released their debut studio album New Wave in early 1993, through Hut Records, a subsidiary of major label Virgin Records. It reached number 35 on the UK Albums Chart. Celloist James Banbury joined the band around this time, and by mid-1993, drummer Glenn Collins was replaced by Barny C. Rockford.

Promotion of Now I'm a Cowboy was stunted as a result of Haines breaking both of his ankles.

== Singles ==
"Lenny Valentino" was released as the lead single from Now I'm a Cowboy in November 1993, reaching number 41 in the UK singles chart, followed by "Chinese Bakery" which reached number 42 in April 1994. "Lenny Valentino" was released to modern rock radio stations in the United States in June 1994.

== Critical reception ==
Professional ratings
Review scores
| Source | Rating |
|---|---|
| AllMusic | 4/5 stars |
| Alternative Rock | 8/10 |
| Drowned in Sound | 7/10 |
| Entertainment Weekly | A− |

In a review of the album for AllMusic, Amy Hanson stated that "Now I'm a Cowboy served the Auteurs well, becoming an edgily delicious bridge between their immediate past and their enduring future." She went on to say that "it's also easy to discern the treasure trove of embryonic nuggets that would surface in Haines' Baader Meinhof and Black Box Recorder solo projects." Author Dave Thompson wrote in his book Alternative Rock (2000) that "'Lenny Valentino' says it all casual, camp, and knowing – the rest of the album simply follows in its semi-sordid wake and there's a sinister edge coming through which remains deliciously shocking long after the initial fission has faded."

In 2003, Mojo placed the album at number 40 on its list of the "Top 50 Eccentric Albums".

== Track listing ==
All songs written by Luke Haines.

Original 1994 CD/LP (CDHUT16/HUTLPX16)

1. "Lenny Valentino" – 2:20
2. "Brainchild" – 3:43
3. "I'm a Rich Man's Toy" – 2:54
4. "New French Girlfriend" – 4:15
5. "The Upper Classes" – 6:45
6. "Chinese Bakery" – 3:05
7. "A Sister Like You" – 2:48
8. "Underground Movies" – 3:32
9. "Life Classes / Life Model" – 4:02
10. "Modern History" – 5:36
11. "Daughter of a Child" – 2:36
- Free one-sided 7" (HUTL16)
1. "Modern History" (acoustic version) – 3:24

2014 expanded edition disc 1 bonus tracks

1. "Lenny Valentino (single version)"
2. "Vacant Lot"
3. "Car Crazy"
4. "Disney World"
5. "Lenny Valentino (original mix)"
6. "Underground Movies (alternative mix)"
7. "Brainchild (original version)"

2014 expanded edition disc 2

1. "Government Bookstore"
2. "Everything You Say Will Destroy You"
3. "Chinese Bakery (acoustic)"
4. "Modern History (acoustic)"
5. "Upper Classes (BBC Radio 1 evening session 1994)"
6. "Rich Man's Toy (BBC Radio 1 evening session 1994)"
7. "Underground Movies (BBC Radio 1 evening session 1994)"
8. "Everything You Say Will Destroy You (BBC Radio 1 evening session 1994)"
9. "Lenny Valentino (Mark Radcliffe BBC Radio 1 session 1994)"
10. "Chinese Bakery (Mark Radcliffe BBC Radio 1 Session 1994)"
11. "New French Girlfriend (Mark Radcliffe BBC Radio 1 session 1994)"
12. "Modern History (Mark Radcliffe BBC Radio 1 session 1994)"
13. "How Could I Be Wrong (live at Leeds Town & Country 1993)"
14. "Don't Trust the Stars (live at Leeds Town & Country 1993)"
15. "The Upper Classes (live at Leeds Town & Country 1993)"
16. "New French Girlfriend (live at Leeds Town & Country 1993)"
17. "Showgirl (live at Leeds Town & Country 1993)"
18. "Lenny Valentino (live at Leeds Town & Country 1993)"
19. "Modern History (live at Leeds Town & Country 1993)"
20. "Early Years (live at Leeds Town & Country 1993)"

== Personnel ==
Adapted from the album booklet.

The Auteurs

- Luke Haines – guitar, piano, vocals
- Alice Readman – bass guitar
- James Banbury – cello, Hammond
- Barny Rockford – drums

Additional musicians

- Louise Elliot – sax
- Belinda Sykes – oboe
- Joe Beckett – percussion

Production

- Phil Vinall – producer, engineer
- Luke Haines – producer
- Pete Hoffman – assistant engineer
- Giles Hall – assistant engineer
- Stefan De Batselier – photography
- Peter Barrett – sleeve design
- Andrew Biscomb – sleeve design

== Charts ==
Chart performance for Now I'm a Cowboy
| Chart (1994) | Peak position |
|---|---|
| New Zealand Albums (RMNZ) | 46 |
| Swedish Albums (Sverigetopplistan) | 42 |
| UK Albums (OCC) | 27 |
