= Rock and Roll Animals =

Studio album by Luke Haines
- Released: 29 July 2013
- Genre: Alternative rock, folk, psychedelic rock
- Length: 32:24
- Label: Cherry Red Records
- Producer: Luke Haines

Luke Haines chronology
9 1/2 Psychedelic Meditations on British Wrestling of the 1970s & Early '80s (2011)	Rock and Roll Animals (2013)	New York in the '70s (2014)

Rock and Roll Animals is a concept album by British alternative rock artist Luke Haines. The album follows its predecessor in the way the concept is introduced, but it is not a sequel.

Track 9 is written by Haines ex-collaborator from Black Box Recorder, John Moore, well known for his contribution to The Jesus and Mary Chain.

The title might refer to the Lou Reed 1974 live album Rock 'n' Roll Animal.

== Concept ==
The concept follows a narrative story about outsiders people represented as animals. As in its predecessor, the album uses some namedropping to name the characters and reflect their personalities. The visual representation on the cover art is also a reference as the anthropomorphic characters have similar traits from the named artists. The main characters are a cat called Gene Vincent, a badger called Nick Lowe and a fox called Jimmy Pursey.

A few other bands and artists are named in the song Rock N Roll Animals in Space such as Deep Purple, Led Zeppelin, The Rolling Stones, Brian Jones, The Soft Machine and Robert Wyatt. There are also controversial denunciations involving some of the artists such as Led Zeppelin stole the blues, Not righteous and The Stones with Brian Jones were righteous even though he was probably evil.

== Reception ==
Professional ratings
Review scores
Source	Rating
Record Collector	3/5 stars
AllMusic	4/5 stars
The Bulletin	4/5 stars

Jake Kennedy of Record Collector said if the album's concept "sounds a lot to take in, it isn't really, but it doesn't make any more sense than that". He added that this "loosely child-friendly album might well be a definite way" to enter into Haines' catalogue.

== Track listing ==
All tracks written and composed by Luke Haines except for track 9 by John Moore.

1. "Magic Town" – 2:31
2. "Magic Interlude 1" – 0:38
3. "Rock N Roll Animals" – 2:59
4. "A Badger Called Nick Lowe" – 2:51
5. "Three Friends" – 3:46
6. "Gene Vincent (The Rock'n'roll Mums and The Rock'n'roll Dads)" – 3:41
7. "Magic Interlude 2" – 1:32
8. "The Birds... The Birds" – 2:44
9. "The Angels Of The North" – 3:39
10. "...We Do" – 2:31
11. "From Hersham To Heaven" – 2:18
12. "Rock N Roll Animals In Space" – 3:20

== Credits ==
Music

- Luke Haines – guitar, piano, hammond, ocarina, autoharp, jaw harp, sitar, drums, vocals, songwriting
- Julia Davis – narration
- Sian Superman – alto recorder
- John Moore – songwriting (track 9)

Production

- Luke Haines – producer
- George Shilling – mastering

Visual

- Sian Superman – illustration
- Luke Haines – painting
- Louise Mason – Sleeve, Layout
