= Siân Pattenden =

British journalist

- Occupations: Journalist, author, illustrator, artist
- Employers: Smash Hits; NME; The Face; The Guardian; Independent; Select
- Spouse: Luke Haines
- Website: sianpattenden.co.uk

Siân Pattenden is an English journalist, author, illustrator and artist. She has worked for British publications like The Face, The Guardian, Independent, NME, Select and Smash Hits. Pattenden has written six children's books and the first, The Awful Tale of Agatha Bilke, was published in 2006. It was named Children's Book of the Week in the Sunday Times and short-listed for many book awards. She also works as an illustrator, having illustrated three of her books, and an artist, producing artwork for record sleeves and videos for bands. And she has exhibited artwork worldwide. She is married to English rock musician Luke Haines.

== Books ==
- The Awful Tale of Agatha Bilke
- Paris Match: Agatha goes to France
- Operation Ward Ten: Agatha Strikes. Again
- The Magical Peppers and the Great Vanishing Act
- The Magical Peppers and the Island of Invention
- The Peppers and the International Magic Guys (Magical Peppers)
