= Prick Up Your Ears (play) =

2009 play by Simon Bent

- West End Poster
- Written by: Simon Bent
- Original language: English
- Subject: Joe Orton
- Genre: Dark comedy

Premiere
- Date premiered: 30 September 2009
- Official website

Prick Up Your Ears is a play by Simon Bent, based on the life of playwright Joe Orton. Produced by Sonia Friedman it opened at the Comedy Theatre in London's West End on 30 September 2009 following previews from 17 September, it closed in November 2009. It starred Chris New as Joe Orton and Matt Lucas as Orton's lover and murderer, Kenneth Halliwell.

== About the play ==
According to actor Chris New, the concept for a play came from New's roommate. New contacted actor and comedian Matt Lucas, who was looking to do a play. Simon Bent agreed to script the work, and Sonia Friedman came aboard as producer and Daniel Kramer as director.

New played Orton in the original production.

Matt Lucas originally played the part of Kenneth Halliwell, but pulled out of the production following the death of his former partner. The part of Halliwell was played by Michael Chadwick until 22 October 2009. Con O'Neill took over the role on 23 October.

The play closed on 15 November due to declining ticket sales following Lucas's departure.
