= Baader-Meinhof (disambiguation) =

The Baader-Meinhof Group, also known as Red Army Faction, was a left-wing militant group active in West Germany from 1970 to 1998.

Baader-Meinhof may also refer to:

- Der Baader Meinhof Komplex, a 2008 film by Uli Edel
- Baader Meinhof (album), a 1996 album by Luke Haines
- "Baader-Meinhof", a 1978 song by the band Cabaret Voltaire
- "Baader-Meinhof Blues", a song by Brazilian rock group Legião Urbana on their eponymous 1985 album Legião Urbana
- Frequency illusion, a cognitive bias colloquially known as the Baader–Meinhof effect
- A pseudonym for the rapper Ghostemane
