= New York in the '70s =

Studio album by Luke Haines
- Released: 26 May 2014
- Genre: Alternative rock, folk, psychedelic rock, Electronic
- Length: 33:11
- Label: Cherry Red Records
- Producer: Luke Haines

Luke Haines chronology
Rock and Roll Animals (2013)	New York in the '70s (2014)	Raving (Vols 1-75) (2015)

New York in the '70s is a concept album by British alternative rock artist Luke Haines. The music style is influenced by new wave and protopunk bands from the New York scene mostly by Suicide (band).

Into his song "Cerne Abbas Man", he refers Rock and Roll Animals in the sentence The birds were in my last LP.

== Concept ==
Professional ratings
Review scores
Source	Rating
Record Collector	4/5 stars
NME	7/10
PopMatters	7/10
MusicOMH	4/5 stars
The Line of Best Fit	8.5/10

The concept is less of a narrative story and more of a descriptive album. As the title tells, Haines describes some scenes from New York City in 1970s art world. Talking about social context, drug use, sexual liberty.

Similarly to his two previous albums, Haines namedropped several people such as Lou Reed, Jim Carroll, Bill Cunningham, Jimi Hendrix, all the members of The New York Dolls and few others. The band Suicide seems to have a huge influence on the album from its style, but also as Alan Vega is referred to in the first and last track. The song City Drone sounds a lot like the band's style as well as UK Punk that sounds specifically like Suicide's Rocket U.S.A. The link can also make by the comparaison of "UK" vs "U.S.A." diminutives.

He also refers to iconic places such as Chelsea Hotel, CBGB, The Mercer Arts Center, etc.

== Track listing ==
All tracks written and composed by Luke Haines except for track 9 by John Moore.

1. "Alan Vega Says" – 3:17
2. "Drone City" – 2:55
3. "NY in the 70s" – 2:39
4. "Jim Carroll" – 1:48
5. "Tricks n Kicks n Drugs" – 2:10
6. "Bill's Bunker" – 3:28
7. "Dolls Forever" – 2:32
8. "New York City Breakdown" – 1:38
9. "Lou Reed Lou Reed" – 2:06
10. "UK Punk" – 3:13
11. "Cemes Abbas Man" – 4:11
12. "NY Stars" – 3:22

== Credits ==
Music

- Luke Haines – guitar, keyboards, drums, vocals, songwriting

Production

- Luke Haines – producer
- Ed Woods – mastering

Visual

- Siân Pattenden – photography
- Luke Haines – painting
- Louise Mason – Sleeve, Layout
