= Ladyman =

Ladyman is a surname. Notable people with the surname include:

- David Ladyman, American game designer
- Jack Ladyman (born 1947), American mechanical engineer and politician
- James Ladyman, British philosopher of science
- Samuel Ladyman (1643–1684), Anglican priest in Ireland
- Stephen Ladyman (born 1952), British politician
