= The Oliver Twist Manifesto =

The Oliver Twist Manifesto (Or) What's Wrong with Popular Culture

Studio album by Luke Haines
- Released: 2 July 2001
- Genres: Indie rock, baroque pop
- Length: 36:55
- Label: Hut
- Producers: Luke Haines & Pete Hoffman

Luke Haines chronology
Christie Malry's Own Double Entry OST (2001)	The Oliver Twist Manifesto (Or) What's Wrong with Popular Culture (2001)	Das Capital (2003)

The Oliver Twist Manifesto (subtitled (Or) What's Wrong with Popular Culture) is the debut album by English musician Luke Haines (formerly of The Auteurs), released in 2001.

== Reception ==
Professional ratings
Review scores
Source	Rating
AllMusic	4/5 stars

Stuart Clark of Hot Press reviewed the album positively, calling Haines a "grumpy, arrogant, sarcastic, [and] aggressive", as well as "a complete genius". Michael Hubbard of MusicOMH gave a more mixed review, pointing to Discomania (also included on Christie Malry's Own Double Entry OST), which he describes as "rather unnecessary"; "remixed here with strings and horrible drum taps".

== Track listing ==
1. "Rock 'N' Roll Communique No 1" – 2:05
2. "Oliver Twist" – 3:23
3. "Death of Sarah Lucas" – 2:44
4. "Never Work" – 2:56
5. "Discomania" – 3:34
6. "Mr & Mrs Solanas" – 3:49
7. "What Happens When We Die" – 2:08
8. "Christ" – 3:07
9. "The Spook Manifesto" – 5:44
10. "England vs. America" – 2:44
11. "The Oliver Twist Manifesto" – 4:35
