= Out of My Hair =

- Front cover of Out of My Hair 1996 album, Drop The Roof

Background information
- Origin: London, England
- Genres: Alternative rock
- Years active: 1993–1997
- Labels: RCA Records, BMG
- Past members: Simon Eugene; Sean Elliot; Kenny Rumbles; John George; Barney C. Rockford; Jake; Odran 'Oddy' Jennings; George Muranyi; Paul Godfrey

Out of My Hair are an English pop/alternative rock band, primarily active in the mid-1990s. The band consisted of Simon Eugene, also known as Comfort (vocals, guitar, bass, piano, keyboards), Sean Elliot (guitar), Kenny Rumbles (drums) and George Muranyi (keyboards). Their single "Mister Jones" entered the UK Singles Chart peaking at number 73.

== History ==
The early version of the band was formed in 1991 by Eugene. Early membership included Barny C. Rockford (who later became a member of The Auteurs) on drums. The band performed several gigs in the UK and Amsterdam, but did not release any records.

In late 1993 Eugene, feeling that "the chemistry of the band didn't seem right", decided to reform it. Elliot remained on guitar, Rockford was replaced by Kenny Rumbles, Eugene replaced Jake on bass and John George joined the band as another guitarist.

In June 1994 their first single was released, featuring two songs: "In the Groove Again" and "River of Gold". In late 1995 the band released their only full album, Drop The Roof. The album was first released in Japan, where it gained a relatively significant success. A UK release followed in early 1996, but it failed to become popular.

During those years, Out of my Hair toured extensively supporting artists including David Bowie, Crash Test Dummies and Barenaked Ladies.

In spite of some positive criticism, and a success of the "In the Groove Again" single, the band remained unknown to the wide public and quietly disappeared around 1997 when Simon went solo using his performing name Comfort. Some further supports followed, notably with Radiohead in Paris and a new album God is in the Detail was ready for release when Comfort's label folded. After appearing at the South by Southwest Festival in early 1999 Comfort all but retired from performing until the mid-2000s when he formed the International Love Corporation.

More recently Eugene has returned again with the Out of My Hair name and released a number of new singles, including "Cream" and "The Return EP", which was featured on Mark Radcliffe's BBC Radio 6 Music show.

== Discography ==
=== Singles ===
- "Hearts Desire" (7", Red) RCA 1994 - UK No. 99
- "In The Groove Again" (7", Single) RCA 1994
- "In The Groove Again" (CD, Single) RCA 1994 - UK No. 99
- "Mister Jones" (CD, Single, Dig) BMG 1995 - UK No. 73
- "Safe Boy" (CD, Single) BMG 1995

=== Albums ===
- Drop The Roof (CD) BMG Victor Inc. 1995

Different track listing order from the original UK version. It omitted "Gracie's Social Please Me's" and "That's All" and added "Cool Mathematician", "River of Gold", "She Turns It On" and "Strange Company".

- Drop The Roof (CD) BMG 1996
