= 9 1/2 Psychedelic Meditations on British Wrestling of the 1970s & Early '80s =

Studio album by Luke Haines
- Released: 7 November 2011
- Genre: Alternative rock, folk, electronic, psychedelic rock
- Length: 30:11
- Label: Fantastic Plastic Records
- Producer: Luke Haines

Luke Haines chronology
21st Century Man / Achtung Mutha (2009)	9 1/2 Psychedelic Meditations on British Wrestling of the 1970s & Early '80s (2011)	Rock and Roll Animals (2013)

9 1/2 Psychedelic Meditations on British Wrestling of the 1970s & Early '80s is a concept album by British alternative rock artist Luke Haines. The album has been initially released as a digital version on iTunes. It has later been adapted to CD and vinyl format.

== Concept ==
As its title explicitly says, the songs have psychedelic arrangements and are talking about old wrestlers.

In the course of the album, Haines uses true wrestler names and uses them to make his fictional story. Haines's namedropping contains: Mark Rocco, Gorgeous George, Mick McManus, Shirley Crabtree, Pat Roach, Kendo Nagasaki, George Cannon and many more.

== Track listing ==
All tracks written and composed by Luke Haines except for track 1 by Don Harper.

1. "Inside The Restless Mind Of Rollerball Rocco" – 4:15
2. "What The Plumber Saw" – 0:55
3. "Gorgeous George" – 3:39
4. "Rock Opera – In The Key Of Existential Misery" – 3:53
5. "Linda's Head" – 2:38
6. "Saturday Afternoon" – 2:35
7. "Big Daddy Got A Casio VL Tone" – 2:30
8. "I Am Catweazle" – 3:19
9. "We Are Unusual Men" – 3:43
10. "Haystacks' In Heaven" – 2:46

=== iTunes bonus track ===
1. "Me And The Birds" – 2:50

== Personnel ==
Music

- Luke Haines – guitar, piano, vocals, Songwrtting
- Don Harper – Songwriting (track 1)

Production

- Luke Haines – Producer
- George Shilling – Mastering

Design

- Sian Superman – Kendo Nagasaki Doll photography
- Luke Haines – Wrestlers Calendar painting
- Louise Mason – Sleeve, Layout
