= New Wave (The Auteurs album) =

Studio album by the Auteurs
- Released: 22 February 1993
- Genre: Alternative rock, indie pop
- Length: 43:41
- Label: Hut
- Producer: Phil Vinall, Luke Haines

The Auteurs chronology
New Wave (1993)	Now I'm a Cowboy (1994)

New Wave is the 1993 debut album by British rock band the Auteurs. In 2014, British independent record label 3 Loop Music re-released the album on 180gsm Vinyl and as a 2CD Expanded Edition which included b-sides, rarities, radio session tracks and the original 4-track demos that led to the band's signing with Hut Records.

== Background ==
After the demise of the Servants, musicians Luke Haines and Alice Readman formed the Auteurs; former Dog Unit drummer Glenn Collins joined soon after. The trio made their live debut in April 1992 at the Euston Rails Club in London, signing to Hut Records, a subsidiary of major label Virgin Records. British press saw the band as part of a potential glam rock revival, while American press would plainly compare them to Suede. Author Dave Thompson wrote in his book Alternative Rock (2000) that New Wave laid the groundwork for what would subsequently become Britpop.

== Release and reception ==
Professional ratings
Review scores
Source	Rating
AllMusic	4.5/5 stars
Alternative Rock	8/10
Drowned in Sound	9/10
The Encyclopedia of Popular Music	4/5 stars
Entertainment Weekly	A−
The Irish Times	4/5 stars
Record Collector	3/5 stars
The Rolling Stone Album Guide	4/5 stars
Select	4/5
The Village Voice	A−

"Show Girl" was released the lead single in December 1992, ahead of New Wave, which appeared in early 1993. By this point, celloist James Banbury joined the band. By mid-1993, Collins was replaced by Barny C. Rockford.

Thompson referred to the album as a "university thesis on how to build Brit-pop, shot through with such startlingly intelligent perversity that the end result is more of a template than a tribute." He singled "Show Girl" and "Junk Shop Clothes" as highlights. Stereo Review wrote that "Haines is a brooder who tends toward minor keys and bleak but arresting lyrics that obsess on the darker side of showbiz and celebrity." The Washington Post concluded that "not all these songs are as catchy as 'Bailed Out' or 'Early Years' but those who empathize with Haines's self-mocking boho sensibility will find New Wave immensely appealing."

In a retrospective review, Jake Kennedy of Record Collector said it was not the band's best effort, but considered it a "canny time capsule, bundled up with all the retro glam of the era", with a number of lyrical topics which "confuse and charm in equal measure".

Thompson said that it was one of the most acclaimed albums in 1993. It was shortlisted for the 1993 Mercury Prize. It is now included in the 1001 Albums You Must Hear Before You Die list.

== Track listing ==
All songs written by Luke Haines.

Original 1993 CD/LP (CDHUT7/HUTLP7)

1. "Show Girl" - 4:06
2. "Bailed Out" - 3:44
3. "American Guitars" - 3:31
4. "Junk Shop Clothes" - 2:42
5. "Don't Trust the Stars" - 2:25
6. "Starstruck" - 2:59
7. "How Could I Be Wrong" - 3:53
8. "Housebreaker" - 2:57
9. "Valet Parking" - 2:55
10. "Idiot Brother" - 5:45
11. "Early Years" - 2:40
12. "Home Again" - 3:24 / "Subculture (They Can't Find Him)" - 2:13 (hidden track; it follows 20 seconds of silence after the end of "Home Again")
- Free 7" (HUTL2)
1. "She Might Take a Train" - 1:38
2. "Subculture (They Can't Find Him)" - 2:13

2014 expanded edition bonus tracks (Disc 1)

1. "Subculture (They Can't Find Him)"
2. "She Might Take a Train"
3. "Glad to Be Gone"
4. "Staying Power"
5. "Wedding Day"
6. "High Diving Horses"

2014 Expanded Edition Bonus Tracks (Disc 2)

1. "Housebreaker (Rough Trade Singles Club 7")"
2. "Valet Parking (Rough Trade Singles Club 7")"
3. "Housebreaker (Acoustic Version)"
4. "Junk Shop Clothes (Acoustic Version)"
5. "Starstruck (Acoustic Version)"
6. "Home Again (Acoustic Version)"
7. "Junk Shop Clothes (1993 BBC Radio 1 Session)"
8. "New French Junkshop (1993 BBC Radio 1 Session)"
9. "Government Bookstore (1993 BBC Radio 1 Session)"
10. "How Could I Be Wrong (1993 BBC Radio 1 Session)"
11. "Bailed Out (Original 4-Track Demo)"
12. "American Guitars (Original 4-Track Demo)"
13. "Showgirl (Original 4-Track Demo)"
14. "Glad to Be Gone (Original 4-Track Demo)"
15. "Starstruck (Original 4-Track Demo)"
16. "Early Years (Original 4-Track Demo)"

== Personnel ==
Personnel per booklet.

The Auteurs

- Luke Haines – guitar, piano, vocals
- Alice Readman – bass guitar
- Glenn Collins – drums

Additional musicians

- James Banbury – cello
- Chris Wyles – percussion
- Kuljit Bhamra – percussion
- Joe Beckett – percussion

Production

- Phil Vinall – engineer, producer
- Luke Haines – producer
- Stefan de Batselier – photography
- Peter Barrett – sleeve design
- Andrew Biscomb – sleeve design

== Charts ==
Chart performance for New Wave
Chart (1993)	Peak position
UK Albums (OCC)	35
