= How I Learned to Love the Bootboys =

Studio album by the Auteurs
- Released: 5 July 1999
- Recorded: January – April 1998
- Studios: RAK, London
- Genre: Glam rock
- Length: 35:15
- Labels: Hut, Virgin
- Producers: Luke Haines; Pete Hofmann; Phil Vinall

The Auteurs chronology
After Murder Park (1996)	How I Learned to Love the Bootboys (1999)

Singles from How I Learned to Love the Bootboys
- 1. "The Rubettes" Released: 31 May 1999; 2. "Some Changes" Released: 18 October 1999

How I Learned to Love the Bootboys is the fourth and final album by British rock band the Auteurs. It was released on 5 July 1999 through Hut and Virgin Records. Following their third studio album After Murder Park (1996), Haines started the Baader Meinhof and Black Box Recorder projects. He regrouped with the Auteurs to start work on a concept album under the name ESP Kids, though sessions halted as Black Box Recorder worked on their debut album England Made Me (1998). The Auteurs re-started recording their next album in January 1998 at RAK Studios in London; Hut and Virgin were not happy with the lack of single-sounding songs. After writing "The Rubettes", the band finished recording in April 1998. How I Learned to Love the Bootboys is a glam rock album that takes atmospheric influence from England Made Me.

How I Learned to Love the Bootboys received generally favourable reviews from critics, some of whom praised the quality of the songs, while others commented on the nostalgia aspect. Ahead of the album's release, "The Rubettes" appeared as its lead single in May 1999, which was followed by performances in France and a tour of the United Kingdom in October 1999. That same month, "Some Changes" was released as the second single from the album. The Auteurs broke up shortly afterwards. Some outtakes from the ESP Kids sessions appeared on the compilation Luke Haines Is Dead (2006); How I Learned to Love the Bootboys was reissued in 2014 with B-sides, outtakes and a live show. NME and Select included it on their lists of the best albums of the year.

== Background and recording ==
The Auteurs released their third studio album After Murder Park in March 1996. Despite it being well-received critically, it underperformed commercially. Frontman Luke Haines released an album under the name Baader Meinhof later in the year, which he said was met with "duncery and confusion". He debated breaking up the Auteurs as he was confident that their label Virgin Records was going to drop them from the roster. As Haines struggled for a new direction, he opted to play with his friend Ian Bickerton in the folk act Balloon, where he met John Moore and Sarah Nixey. Haines, Moore and Nixey formed the Black Box Recorder project; to Haines' surprise, Virgin and Hut Records greenlit another Auteurs album, with the stipulation it would contain hit singles. Haines instead entered a studio with the rest of the band with the aiming of making a concept album known as ESP Kids. They recorded four songs – "How I Learned to Love the Bootboys", "Johnny and the Hurricanes", "Future Generation" and "School" – before progress halted with Haines continuing to work on Black Box Recorder. They made the album England Made Me (1998); while waiting for its release, the Auteurs started recording a new album of their own in January 1998 at RAK Studios in London.

After three weeks, they recorded around 15 songs that centred on acoustic and synthesizer-based instrumentation. The following month, Haines showed his labels what he thought would be the finished version of the album, only to be told to write a single. He shifted his main focus to Black Box Recorder; the Auteurs planned to record, but were delayed when Haines broke his wrist after falling down a flight of stairs. Haines came up with "The Rubettes" for Black Box Recorder, but after Nixey was unable to work with the song, it became the single that the Auteurs needed. The final recording sessions for How I Learned to Love the Bootboys took place in April 1998 with only Haines and keyboardist James Banbury in attendance. Haines and Pete Hofmann produced nearly all the songs, save for "Johnny and the Hurricanes", which was produced by Phil Vinall; Hofmann later mixed the recordings. Haines later said that because of his focus on Black Box Recorder, How I Learned to Love the Bootboys "didn't receive my full attention".

== Composition and lyrics ==
How I Learned to Love the Bootboys is a glam rock album; it takes some of its atmospheric influence from England Made Me. Drowned in Sound writer Alexander Tudor wrote that Haines incorporated the sound of glam "in the form of glossy synths, twinkling xylophones, doowop vocals, perfect pop hooks, and saccharine sentiments" with his "elegant guitar lines, and hushed narration". Haines wrote all of the songs bar "The Rubettes", which is credited to Haines, Moore, Wayne Bickerton and Tony Waddington, and "Asti Spumante", which is credited to Haines and Sie Medway-Smith. Haines referred to it as an anti-nostalgia album that focused on the darker aspects of life in the 1970s, though admitted that it turned out darker than he was expecting. He expanded on this, detailing that the decade consisted of "black and white TVs and the power going off every Saturday night ... And closedown and the bloody national anthem at the end of it". It was split into two parts, an experimental side and a pop-sounding one, to which Haines regretted not putting more material on it, such as the B-sides "Get Wrecked at Home" and "Breaking Up", to expand it into a double album. Sunday Herald's Neil Cooper wrote that the title was a homage to the "1990s vogue for all things laddish and the laughable re-invention of classroom geeks as lager-swilling football yobs"; Haines said he was "not a team player and I certainly wouldn't get involved with rough boys". Clarence Tsui of South China Morning Post wrote that there was "deadpan tales of incestuous fathers, wily street gangs and the despairing rise of right-wing nationalism are set to 1970s and 80s grooves" amongst the lyrical themes found on the album.

The album's opening track "The Rubettes" is a Brill Building tribute to the band of the same name, incorporating that act's song "Sugar Baby Love" (1974). Haines wrote it on a glockenspiel during the period he injured his wrist, to which Moore wrote the second verse lyrics. It was originally intended to be a Black Box Recorder song until Haines explained that it dealt with the 1970s, which would have been a little too old" for Nixey. Nixey and Moore sing backing vocals on the song; Chris Wyle played drums on it and the following song "1967", which is named after the year Haines was born in. Louder Than War's Craig Chaligne wrote that both "The Rubettes" and "1967" detailed "characters with polar opposite attitudes towards pop music but both finishing with a reference to the nineties". "How I Learned to Love the Bootboys" is a quiet track, with hushed vocals from Haines, that is joined by the sound of sirens, a dub bassline and electro noises. Tsui considered it to be a "confession from a bullied youth", while recalling "Atomic" (1980) by Blondie. "Your Gang, Our Gang" sees gangs from movies such as Grease (1978) and West Side Story (1961) fight in London streets. The chorus of "Some Changes" evokes "Heroes" (1977) by David Bowie; "School" sees Haines sing from the viewpoint of a child in the process of being abducted over a start-stop drum pattern. "Jonny and the Hurricanes" is a leftover from the ESP Kids project. "Asti Spumante" and "Sick of Hari Krisna" are two mood pieces. The album concludes with another ESP Kids' holdover, "Future Generation", which sees Haines ponder if the band would be remembered in years to come.

== Release ==
On 6 March 1999, How I Learned to Love the Bootboys was announced for release in a few months' time. Haines and Moore wrapped up a residency with their other band Black Box Recorder the following month. "The Rubettes" was released as the album's lead single on 31 May 1999, with "Breaking Up" and "Get Wrecked at Home". How I Learned to Love the Bootboys was released by Hut Records on 5 July 1999; it was promoted with one-off performance from the Auteurs at the Embassy Rooms in London 11 days later. They appeared at the Reading and Leeds Festivals, prior to some shows in France and a headlining UK tour in October 1999; the band broke up shortly afterwards. "Some Changes" was released as the album's second single on 18 October 1999.

Haines re-recorded "Future Generation" and "The Rubettes" (the latter as part of a pregap medley) in an orchestral style for Das Capital (2003). Songs from the abandoned ESP Kids project were later released on the Luke Haines Is Dead (2005) compilation, which compiled material from Haines, Baader Meinhof and the Auteurs. How I Learned to Love the Bootboys was reissued as a two-CD set in 2014, which included B-sides, acoustic versions and a live set recorded in late 1999 at the LSE Students' Union. That same year, the standard version of the album was re-pressed on vinyl. How I Learned to Love the Bootboys was then included on the career-spanning CD box set People 'Round Here Don't Like to Talk About It – The Complete EMI Recordings (2023) alongside the other Auteurs albums.

== Reception ==
Professional ratings
Review scores
Source	Rating
AllMusic	4.5/5 stars
Alternative Rock	9/10
Drowned in Sound	7/10
NME	7/10
Select	4/5
The Times	5/10

How I Learned to Love the Bootboys was met with generally favourable reviews from music critics. Kellman said the album's "cohesiveness ... is no small feat, given the wide-ranging sounds and moods". He complimented Haines and Hofmann's "best production yet" as the guitars have "never sounded so fittingly sharp while avoiding abrasiveness". Tudor called it a "daring return to form" after the "intriguing diversion" of the Baader Meinhof project, adding that it was a "more successful and accessible collection of songs and stories than its recourse to glam-stylings might suggest". Select writer Gareth Grundy said Haines was "still the master of the pilthy dismissal", adding that "both conceptually and sonically" this is the album that Haines "has been building towards". Eamon Sweeney of Hot Press saw it as an "almost faultless collection of songs", to which The Irish Times writer Kevin Courtney echoed. Author Dave Thompson wrote in his book Alternative Rock (2000) that it was a "very English album, ... but a universal horror haunts its dusty corners."

Some reviewers commented on the older sound and 1970s aspect of the album. musicOMH editor Michael Hubbard highlighted a variety of influences that "work[ed] bloody brilliantly" meshed together. The staff at Entertainment.ie said Haines "dips into the darker recesses of the decade [1970s] and comes up with one of the albums of the year"; The Guardian critic Dave Simpson similarly wrote that the band returned to "poop the festivities of 1970s nostalgia ... Coal-black humour is matched by marvellous tunes in Haines's 'anti-nostalgic, retarded glam rock'. You may wish to avoid him in the pub". In a review for The Times, journalist Nigel Williamson noted that Haines focused on the "banality of the Seventies", but felt that the tracks "lack[ed] wit and far from being subversive are simply arch". David Sinclair of The Times said that Haines "complains in a querulous half-croak, half falsetto voice that he hates nostalgia, and then indulges in a succession of musty tales from a troubled past ... He should get out more".

NME ranked the album at number 45 on their list of the best albums of 1999, while Select placed it higher at 20.

== Track listing ==
All songs written by Luke Haines, except where noted.

1. "The Rubettes" (Haines, John Moore, Wayne Bickerton, Tony Waddington) – 3:27
2. "1967" – 2:42
3. "How I Learned to Love the Bootboys" – 3:05
4. "Your Gang, Our Gang" – 1:46
5. "Some Changes" – 3:19
6. "School" – 2:58
7. "Johnny and the Hurricanes" – 3:51
8. "The South Will Rise Again" – 2:24
9. "Asti Spumante" (Haines, Sie Medway-Smith) – 3:27
10. "Sick of Hari Krisna" – 2:51
11. "Lights Out" – 2:10
12. "Future Generation" – 3:11

== Personnel ==
Personnel per booklet.

The Auteurs

- Luke Haines – vocal, guitar, keyboards
- James Banbury – keyboards, programming, strings
- Alice Readman – bass guitar
- Barny C. Rockford – drums

Additional musicians

- Chris Wyles – drums (tracks 1 and 2)
- Sarah Nixey – backing vocals (track 1)
- John Moore – backing vocals (track 1)
- Theresa Whipple – viola
- Abigail Trundle – cello
- Bern Davis – cello

Production and design

- Luke Haines – producer
- Pete Hofmann – producer (except for "Johnny and the Hurricanes"), mixing
- Phil Vinall – producer on "Johnny and the Hurricanes"
- Rip – portrait photograph

== See also ==
- The Facts of Life – Haines' next release after How I Learned to Love the Bootboys
