= 21st Century Man / Achtung Mutha =

Studio album by Luke Haines
- Released: 2 November 2009
- Genre: Pop, rock
- Length: 63:16
- Label: Fantastic Plastic
- Producer: Luke Haines, Pete Hoffman

Luke Haines chronology
Off My Rocker at the Art School Bop (2006)	21st Century Man / Achtung Mutha (2009)	9 1/2 Psychedelic Meditations on British Wrestling of the 1970s & Early '80s (2011)

21st Century Man / Achtung Mutha (often referred to simply as 21st Century Man) is an album by English musician Luke Haines, released on 2 November 2009, on 2 CDs.

== Critical reception ==
Professional ratings
Review scores
Source	Rating
The Irish Times	3/5 stars
MusicOMH	3.5/5 stars
Record Collector	3/5 stars
WebCutsMusic	8/10

Nadine McBay described the album "part celebration of the outcast", and part "nihilistic gloom", and as more consistent than his previous album Off My Rocker at the Art School Bop, however not without some unremarkable tracks, such as "White Honky Afro". Andy Gill of The Independent noted the album's themes of self-sabotage and outsider identity, referencing figures like Peter Hammill and Klaus Kinski, with a sardonic commentary on cultural divides and suburbia in England.

Jake Kennedy, writing for Record Collector, noted a blunting of Haines' lyrical edge, and that while a man who titled a song "Russian Futurists Black Out The Sun" still had plenty to offer, but that for "every witticism" there was a "banality", or "worse still, a crude Americanism". Ben Graham of The Quietus noted that the album seemed to be played "surprisingly straight" by Haines' standards.

== Track listing ==
All tracks are written by Luke Haines.

CD1: 21st Century Man
No.	Title	Length
1.	"Suburban Mourning"	4:09
2.	"Peter Hammill"	2:49
3.	"Klaus Kinski"	4:08
4.	"Love Letter To London"	2:48
5.	"Wot A Rotter"	3:31
6.	"Our Man In Buenos Aires"	3:25
7.	"Russian Futurists Black Out The Sun"	3:07
8.	"English Southern Man"	4:08
9.	"White Honky Afro"	2:09
10.	"21st Century Man"	6:51

All tracks are written by Luke Haines.

CD2: Achtung Mutha
No.	Title	Length
1.	"Achtung Intro"	0:22
2.	"Mother"	1:05
3.	"The Great Brain Robbery Part 1"	4:56
4.	"Ex-Teds"	3:36
5.	"The Great Brain Robbery Part 2"	5:46
6.	"Playground Dread"	1:17
7.	"Greenwich Observatory"	2:09
8.	"The Great Brain Robbery Part 3"	4:20
9.	"Fag Break"	2:45
