= Ulrike Hanna Meinhof =

Professor at the University of Southampton

Ulrike Hanna Meinhof is an Emeritus Professor in the Department of Modern Languages at the University of Southampton in Hampshire. She previously worked as a professor and Chair of Cultural Studies at the University of Bradford in West Yorkshire. She is a specialist in discourse analysis. Her main areas of research involve ethnographic research in European border communities and a comparative media-project about the 20th century on television.

Meinhof is the author of Language Learning in the Age of Satellite Television, published by Oxford University Press.

== Works ==
- Text, Discourse and Context: Representation of Poverty in Britain. (with K. Richardson, eds.), London & New York: Longman, 1994
- Télé-textes (with Elspeth Broady) (1995)
- Language and Masculinity (with S. Johnson, eds.) Oxford: Blackwell, 1997
- Language Learning in the Age of Satellite Television. Oxford University Press, 1998
- Worlds in Common? Satellite discourse in a changing Europe (with Kay Richardson), London & New York: Routledge, 1999
- English in a Changing World (with David Graddol) (1999)
- Intertextuality and the Media: from Genre to Everyday life (with Jonathan M. Smith, eds.) Manchester and New York: Manchester University Press, 2000)
- Africa and Applied Linguistics (editor) (2003)
- Transcultural Europe: Cultural Policy in a Changing Europe (editor) (2006)
- Worlds in Common?: Television Discourses in a Changing Europe (with Kay Richardson) (2005)
- Cultural Globalization and Music: African Artists in Transnational Networks (with Nadia Kiwan) (2011)
- Negotiating Multicultural Europe: Borders, Networks, Neighbourhoods (editor) (2011)
- Living (with) Borders: Identity Discourses on East-West Borders in Europe (Routledge Revivals) (editor) (2018)
