= Luke Haines =

English musical artist (born 1967)

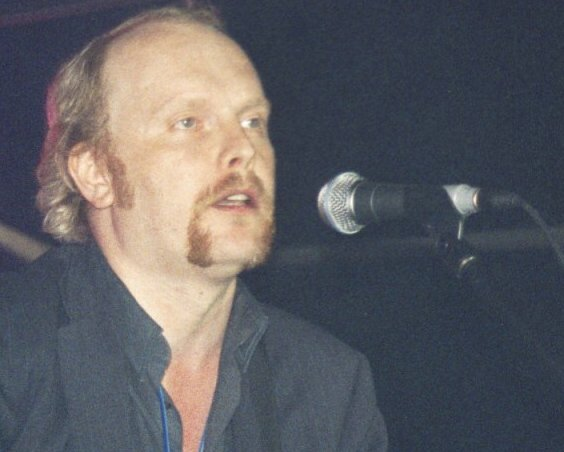
- Haines, performing at the 2005 Summer Sundae

Background information
- Born: Luke Michael Haines; 7 October 1967 (age 59); Walton-on-Thames, Surrey, England
- Origin: England
- Genres: Alternative rock; electronica
- Occupation: Singer-songwriter
- Instruments: Guitar; piano; keyboards; vocals
- Years active: 1985–present
- Label: Degenerate
- Spouse: Siân Pattenden
- Website: www.facebook.com/lukehainesuk/

Luke Michael Haines (born 7 October 1967) is an English musician, songwriter and author. He has recorded music under various names and with various bands, including The Auteurs, Baader Meinhof and Black Box Recorder.

== Career ==
=== New Wave ===
Haines formed numerous bands when he was at school. At college he joined The Servants who recorded two commercially unsuccessful albums. It was only when Haines formed The Auteurs with Glenn Collins and girlfriend Alice Readman, who had also been drafted into The Servants on occasion, in 1991, that he began to achieve some success.

Regular gigging in London and an NME-sponsored gig brought them to the attention of Hut Records. They released their first single, "Showgirl" in 1993, and their debut album New Wave a month later. Haines claimed the album started Britpop, though he later showed disdain towards the movement. The album sold only 12,000 copies but was nominated for a Mercury Prize, although the eventual winners were Suede.

=== Brush with fame ===
Their second album, Now I'm a Cowboy, (1994) featured "Lenny Valentino", which became one of their best-known songs. Soon after, Haines broke both of his ankles, resulting in the cancellation of much of their 1994 European tour. At the time he claimed "I jumped off a fifteen-foot wall[...]to finish the tour and get the insurance" but later, in the sleeve notes to greatest hits collection Das Capital, he denied that it was deliberate, writing "I merely drank too much wine and fell over." Unable to walk for most of 1995, Haines began writing the Auteurs' third album, After Murder Park. Bleaker and more introspective than previous albums, it was produced by Steve Albini and recorded at Abbey Road studios in North London.

=== New projects ===
The Auteurs recorded a session for John Peel on 20 February 1996. Soon after, Haines formed solo side project called Baader-Meinhof named after the German far-left terrorist group. The Auteurs briefly disbanded, only to reunite once more for their fourth album How I Learned to Love the Bootboys.

=== Black Box Recorder ===
Following the release of what turned out to be the final Auteurs record, Haines formed Black Box Recorder with John Moore (formerly of The Jesus and Mary Chain) and Sarah Nixey. The band produced three commercially successful albums, England Made Me, The Facts of Life, and Passionoia. There is also a B-sides collection, The Worst of Black Box Recorder. The Facts of Life produced the eponymous single, which has been the biggest hit of Haines' career so far. Although no official split announcement was made, the band have been on hiatus since the mid-2000s.

=== Going solo ===
In 2000 Haines wrote the soundtrack for Christie Malry's Own Double Entry, a film adaptation of the B. S. Johnson novel. Director Paul Tickell had originally expressed a wish to license How I Learned to Love the Bootboys as the soundtrack for the film but could not afford the rights. In the same year Haines released The Oliver Twist Manifesto, a solo album released under his own name.

Soon after the sale of Virgin Records to French company Fnac, David Boyd of Hut Records (owned by Virgin) enlisted Haines to release an Auteurs greatest hits collection, giving the band the opportunity to re-record the songs as they saw fit. Das Capital: The Song Writing Genius of Luke Haines therefore consisted mostly of new versions of Auteurs songs with the inclusion of a string quartet, with some new tracks. A box set covering his career to date, Luke Haines is Dead, was issued in 2005, and two new albums were expected in 2006, including the soundtrack to the abandoned musical Property, which also features Sarah Nixey. It remains unreleased. Cherry Red Records released a Best of The Servants compilation, with sleeve notes by Haines, the same year.

Off My Rocker at the Art School Bop was released in October 2006. Haines worked with pop producer Richard X on some tracks. The album was preceded by a double A-sided single "Off My Rocker at the Art School Bop (Richard X version)", backed with "I Am The Best Artist/Skinny White Girls." Haines toured the UK and Ireland in support of the album during November 2006, with John Moore guesting on bowed saw and backing vocals at some dates. Haines also played at book signings for David Peace during the promotional tour for his novel The Damned United.

Haines and Peter Buck, formerly of R.E.M., collaborated on an album, Beat Poetry for Survivalists, which was released in 2020.

=== Black Box Recorder reformation ===
In December 2007, Black Box Recorder teamed up with Art Brut to create the single Christmas Number One under the collaborative title of The Black Arts. In October 2008 Black Box Recorder appeared at a Nick Sanderson tribute concert. It was subsequently announced on Luke Haines' web site that the band would play their first headlining gig for five years at The Luminaire, Kilburn, London in February 2009.

=== Writing ===
Haines' memoir Bad Vibes: Britpop and My Part in Its Downfall was published on 1 January 2009 by William Heinemann Ltd. The book covers Haines' experiences during the Britpop era 1991 to 1997. Post Everything: Outsider Rock and Roll, his second volume of memoirs, was published in July 2011. Haines' first cookbook, Outsider Food and Righteous Rock 'N' Roll, was published in 2015.

In May 2009 a novel about Haines by Tim Mitchell Truth and Lies in Murder Park was published by benben press. The book includes material based on interviews with Luke, and explores the themes of his music. In issue four of the comic book Phonogram, Haines appears as a spirit guide leading the main character through a metaphorical land representing Britpop.

=== Documentary ===
A documentary on Haines by Irish director Niall McCann, called Art Will Save the World, premiered at the East End film festival in Dalston on 6 July 2012. It was also shown at the Barcelona, Copenhagen and Cork film festivals. It featured interviews with Jarvis Cocker, John Niven, David Peace and Stewart Home along with extensive interviews with Haines.

== Discography ==
=== Solo albums ===
- The Oliver Twist Manifesto, 2001
- Das Capital, 2003
- Off My Rocker at the Art School Bop, 2006
- 21st Century Man / Achtung Mutha, 2009
- Outsider Music (Vols 1-50), 2010
- 9 1/2 Psychedelic Meditations on British Wrestling of the 1970s & Early '80s, 2011
- Rock and Roll Animals, 2013
- New York in the '70s, 2014
- Raving (Vols 1-75), 2015
- Adventures in Dementia, 2015
- British Nuclear Bunkers, 2015
- Smash the System, 2016
- Freqs, 2016
- I Sometimes Dream of Glue, 2018
- Luke Haines In... Setting The Dogs On The Post Punk Postman, 2021
- Izzy Wizzy Let's Get Bizzy, 2026

=== Soundtracks ===
- Christie Malry's Own Double-Entry, 2001

=== Singles and EPs ===
- "Off My Rocker at the Art School Bop", 2006
- Leeds United EP, 2007
- "Love Letter To London", 2010
- "Rock N Roll Animals", 2013
- "Gene Vincent (Rock n Roll Mums and Rock n Roll Dads)", 2013
- "Lou Reed, Lou Reed", 2014
- "Caravan Man", 2015
- Glue E.P EP, 2018

=== Compilation ===
- Luke Haines Is Dead, 2005
- Outsider / In: The Collection, 2012
- Luke Haines is Alive and Well and Living in Buenos Aires (Heavy, Frenz - The Solo Anthology 2001-2017), 2017

=== Others ===
==== The Auteurs ====
- New Wave, 1993
- Now I'm a Cowboy, 1994
- After Murder Park, 1996
- How I Learned to Love the Bootboys, 1999

==== Black Box Recorder ====
- England Made Me, 1999
- The Facts of Life, 2000
- The Worst of Black Box Recorder, 2001
- Passionoia, 2003
- Life is Unfair, 2018, compilation

==== Baader Meinhof ====
- Baader Meinhof, 1996

==== Collaborations ====
- "Christmas Number One", 2007 (The Black Arts – collaboration between Black Box Recorder and Art Brut)
- The North Sea Scrolls, 2012 (Luke Haines, Cathal Coughlan, Andrew Mueller)
- Test Driving The New Prius, 2020 (Jim Fry and Luke Haines)
- Beat Poetry for Survivalists, 2020 (Luke Haines and Peter Buck)
- All the Kids Are Super Bummed Out, 2022 (Luke Haines and Peter Buck)
- Going Down To The River… To Blow My Mind, 2025 (Luke Haines and Peter Buck)

== Bibliography ==
- Bad Vibes: Britpop and My Part in Its Downfall, 2009 (Published by William Heinemann Ltd)
- Post Everything: Outsider Rock and Roll, 2011 (Published by William Heinemann Ltd)
- Outsider Food And Righteous Rock And Roll, 2015
- Freaks Out! Weirdos, Misfits and Deviants – The Rise and Fall of Righteous Rock ’n’ Roll, 2024 (Published by Nine Eight Books)
