= Simon Bent =

British writer

- Occupations: Screenwriter, playwright
- Writing career
- Language: English

Simon Bent is a British screenwriter and playwright, notable for work including BBC TV drama Beau Brummell: This Charming Man (2006), the screenplay for the feature film Christie Malry's Own Double-Entry (2000), and the Joe Orton biographical play Prick Up Your Ears based on John Lahr's book.

== Theatrical productions ==
He wrote the theatre adaptation of A Prayer for Owen Meany (2002), staged at the Royal National Theatre and in America in Washington, Boston, Philadelphia. Elling (2007) opened at the Bush Theatre with John Simm and Jonathan Cecil and transferred to the Trafalgar Studios; later it was produced in Australia and on Broadway. Prick Up Your Ears was produced in 2009 at the Comedy Theatre with Matt Lucas. The Tall Boy, 2019.

== Plays ==
- "Knuckle Butty"
- "Wigan kiss"
- "Evacuees" Spectrum Theatre Company
- "Full Fathom Five" Royal National Theatre Studio
- "The Blood of Others" Royal National Theatre Studio, Arcola Theatre, 2005
- "Bad Company", Royal National Theatre 1991, Bush Theatre 1994
- "Goldhawk Road",(1996), Bush Theatre
- "Wasted" Old Red Lion Theatre 1993
- "A Prayer for Owen Meany", (2002) Royal National Theatre
- "The Associate" (2002), Royal National Theatre
- "The Escapologist" Suspect Culture, Theatre Royal Plymouth, 2006
- "Shelter" Royal National Studio, This England, 1990; Royal National Theatre, BT Connections, 1998
- "Under the Black Flag", Globe Theatre 2006
- "Branded", Old Vic, New Voices, 2008
- "Elling", Bush Theatre, Trafalgar Studios, Ethel Barrymore Theatre,
- "Accomplicies" Sheffield Crucible 2000
- "Sugar, Sugar" Bush Theatre 1998
- "The Mighty Walzer" Royal Exchange Theatre Manchester 2016
- "The Tall Boy", for Tandy Cronyn 2014

== Television and film ==
- Christie Malry's Own Double-Entry (2000)
- "Beau Brummel:This Charming Man" (2006)
- "The Yellow House" (2007)
- "Sex, The City and Me"(2007)

== Awards ==
He was nominated for the Carl Foreman Award for the Most Promising Newcomer at the 2003 BAFTA Awards, for Christie Malry's Own Double-Entry., ELLING, Winner Best Comedy, Whatsonstage Award 2008
