= After Murder Park =

Studio album by the Auteurs
- Released: 4 March 1996
- Studios: Abbey Road, London
- Genres: Baroque pop; alternative rock; indie pop
- Length: 39:17
- Label: Hut
- Producer: Steve Albini

The Auteurs chronology
Now I'm a Cowboy (1994)	After Murder Park (1996)	How I Learned to Love the Bootboys (1999)

After Murder Park is the third album by British rock band the Auteurs, released in March 1996. The album was recorded at Abbey Road Studios and produced by Steve Albini. In 2014, British independent record label 3 Loop Music re-released the album as a 2CD Expanded Edition which included B-sides, alternate versions, radio session tracks and live recordings.

== Recording ==
After Murder Park was recorded in less than two weeks at Abbey Road Studios, following a year during which frontman Luke Haines had spent most of his time in a wheelchair after jumping off a wall.

Haines had wanted to hire Steve Albini as a producer to achieve a rawer, darker sound than the Auteurs' previous album Now I'm a Cowboy, and to his surprise, the record label agreed. Recording commenced at the end of March 1995, and after only two weeks, the album was recorded and mixed. However, Hut decided to hold back the release for almost a year.

== Release and reception ==
Professional ratings
Review scores
Source	Rating
AllMusic	4/5 stars
Alternative Rock	6/10
Drowned in Sound	8/10
Wall of Sound	78/100

The Back with the Killer EP was issued in January 1996. Following the Kid's Issue EP in May 1996, Haines announced the band's break-up.

The album received mostly decent reviews, entered the British charts at number 53 and sold around 58,000 copies worldwide. During the heyday of Britpop, this was nonetheless seen as a commercial failure. Author Dave Thompson wrote in his book Alternative Rock (2000) that "under Steve Albini's roughshod tutelage, The Auteurs emerge all but unrecognizable – aggressive and angular, but with sufficient melodicism to suggest that whatever else they'd been doing since their last album, ignoring the Beatles wasn't part of it. Ignoring everyone else, however, certainly was." Trouser Press has called the album a "misanthropic mini-masterpiece."

== Track listing ==
All songs written by Luke Haines.

Original CD/LP (CDHUT33/HUTLP33)

1. "Light Aircraft on Fire" – 2:17
2. "Child Brides" – 4:26
3. "Land Lovers" – 2:31
4. "New Brat in Town" – 3:55
5. "Everything You Say Will Destroy You" – 2:42
6. "Unsolved Child Murder" – 2:08
7. "Married to a Lazy Lover" – 3:55
8. "Buddha" – 2:52
9. "Tombstone" – 3:59
10. "Fear of Flying" – 4:41
11. "Dead Sea Navigators" – 3:47
12. "After Murder Park" – 2:00

== Personnel ==
Personnel per album booklet.

The Auteurs

- Luke Haines – guitar, Harmonium, vocals
- James Banbury – cello, Hammond, korg
- Alice Readman – bass guitar
- Barny C. Rockford – drums

Additional musicians

- Andy Bush – French horn
- Marcus Broome – violin
- Eleanor Gilchrist – violin
- Theresa Whipple – viola
- Abigail Trundle – cello
- Bern Davis – cello

Production

- Steve Albini – recording
- Paul Hicks – assistant engineer
- Stefan De Batselier – inner photo
- Chris Cunningham – treated

== Charts ==
Chart performance for After Murder Park
Chart (1996)	Peak position
Scottish Albums (Official Charts)	84
UK Albums (Official Charts)	53

== See also ==
- Baader Meinhof – Haines' next project
