= Elling (play) =

Play written by Simon Bent

Playbill cover of 2010 Broadway production

Elling is a 2007 theatre adaptation by Simon Bent of the 2001 film of the same name. The film and play is based on the book of the same name of Norwegian author Ingvar Ambjørnsen.

The play was directed by Paul Miller and produced at the Bush Theatre, London, it then transferred to the West End at Trafalgar Studios for a critically acclaimed twelve-week run, with John Simm in the title role (who was nominated for an Olivier award for best actor) Adrian Bower, Ingrid Lacey, Jonathan Cecil & Keir Charles.

A different (and less successful) version of the play premiered on Broadway on November 21, 2010 using a completely different cast and director, it closed on November 28, 2010, after 9 performances and 22 previews. The cast included Brendan Fraser and Denis O'Hare playing the mismatched roommates who deal with common concerns related to friendship, work and women. It also starred Jennifer Coolidge as Reidun, Richard Easton as Alfons, and Jeremy Shamos as Frank.
