= Battle (British band) =

British indie rock band

- Genres: Indie rock Post-punk revival
- Years active: 2005–2007
- Label: Transgressive Records
- Members: Jason Bavanandan; Oliver Davies; James Ellis; Timothy Scudder
- Past members: Steve Boyle
- Website: Thisisbattle.band

Battle were a UK indie rock band. They came to some prominence with a sound consisting largely of post-punk, spacious guitar hooks and dance-orientated beats, and have been compared to The Cure, and New Order/Joy Division. Later recordings have grown increasingly organic and atmospheric and reveal a kinship with The Smiths, Remain in Light era Talking Heads and Arcade Fire. The name Battle can be seen as an incitement for the individual to fight for their passions. Many of the band's lyrics revolve around this central theme. The band broke up around October 2007.

== History ==
=== Formation ===
Singer Jason Bavanandan and guitarist Jamie Ellis met at school in Lewisham, South East London in the mid-nineties. Having completed school, they both enrolled at the University of Kent at Canterbury, with the intention of forming a band. The resulting band was Casper Jack. The music of Casper Jack was heavily informed by artists such as Oasis and the Small Faces. When the group's original bassist left, Ellis was introduced to Tim Scudder, at which point the band's sound began to change. Influences such as The Strokes, Joy Division and Pixies began to inform the songwriting process. During this period, the band's keyboardist was dismissed, and the drummer left. The next academic year saw drummer, Oliver Davies join the band. The band changed their name first to Morphic Fields, and later to Killing Moon.

=== Early singles ===
Their first single, "Isabelle" was released on Monday 25 April 2005 on Fierce Panda Records. Their next single, "Demons", was released on 26 September 2005 by their permanent label, Transgressive Records and sold out its 1,500 copies in a day. After the free-download "Wicked Owl", the chart eligible "Tendency", reached No. 37 in the UK Singles Chart. Next single "Children", was championed by Radio 1 DJ Zane Lowe, and was 'hottest record in the world today' on his show.

=== Back to Earth - Mini-album ===
On 23 October 2006, Battle released the seven-track mini-album, Back to Earth, which featured new versions of "Wicked Owl" and "Tendency". The mini-album was critically acclaimed but not commercially successful. Several of the tracks were produced by Gareth Jones and originally intended for the band's full debut album. "I Never Stopped" and "Easy to Listen to" were produced by the band and Jeff Knowler in June 2006. "Beautiful Dynasty" was released as a vinyl-only single in conjunction with Back to Earth.

=== Break the Banks ===
In June 2006, copies of the Gareth Jones sessions were leaked in plain black cases under the title Break the Banks. This was reputedly originally intended to be the band's debut album. The album was never released, though several tracks were included on Back to Earth. The band put the absence of a full-debut down to a marked improvement and prolificness in their song-writing. A new album, also titled Break the Banks was released on 3 September 2007, preceded by a single, "The Longest Time", released on 2 July 2007. Another single, "Paper Street", was released on 13 September 2007. The majority of the album was reputedly written in the six months preceding its recording.

=== 2025 Activity ===
Founding band members Jason Bavanandan and Jamie Ellis have established a new set of social media accounts to remember the band, along with a new website which teases future plans.

== Band members ==
- Jason Bavanandan – vocals, guitar
- Oliver Davies – drums
- James (Jamie) Ellis – guitar
- Tim Scudder – bass

== Discography ==
=== Albums ===
- Break the Banks (3 September 2007)

=== EPs ===
- Back to Earth (23 October 2006)

=== Singles ===
- "Isabelle/Feel the Same" (25 April 2005) UK: No. 98
- "Demons" (26 September 2005)
- "Tendency" (13 March 2006) UK: No. 37
- "Children" (5 June 2006) UK: No. 60
- "The Longest Time" (2 July 2007)
- "Paper Street" (13 September 2007)

== Artwork ==
The cover art for Battle's first four singles and full-length album was painted by Bavanandan's younger sister, Melissa.
