= Lannon =

Lannon is a surname. Notable people with the surname include:

- Frances Lannon (born 1945), British historian
- James Patrick Lannon (1878-1953), American admiral
- Nyles Lannon, American musician
- Ryan Lannon (born 1982), American ice hockey player
- Timothy R. Lannon (born 1952), American university president

== Fictional ==
- Alex Lannon, character in Dominion
