= Off My Rocker at the Art School Bop =

Studio album by Luke Haines
- Released: 30 October 2006
- Genres: Pop, rock
- Length: 35:48
- Label: Degenerate Records
- Producers: Luke Haines and Pete Hoffman

Luke Haines chronology
Luke Haines is Dead (2005)	Off My Rocker at the Art School Bop (2006)	21st Century Man / Achtung Mutha (2009)

Off My Rocker at the Art School Bop is a 2006 album by Luke Haines.

== Critical reception ==
Alexis Petridis, writing for The Guardian, described the album as "both accessible and deeply unsettling", noting the final track's retelling of Gary Glitter's downfall, and that Haines's desire to provoke "verges on the suicidal", when considering the album's muted response. Alex Worsnip of God Is in the TV wrote that it was Haines's most consistent solo album to date.

Professional ratings
Review scores
Source	Rating
musicOMH	4/5 stars
Obscure Sound	Favorable
The Guardian	4/5 stars
God Is in the TV	3/5 stars

== Track listing ==
All tracks are written by Luke Haines.

No.	Title	Length
1.	"Off My Rocker At The Art School Bop"	3:29
2.	"Leeds United"	3:49
3.	"The Heritage Rock Revolution"	3:35
4.	"All The English Devils"	3:40
5.	"The Walton Hop"	2:22
6.	"Fighting In The City Tonight"	3:48
7.	"Here's To Old England"	3:22
8.	"Freddie Mills Is Dead"	3:27
9.	"Secret Yoga"	4:00
10.	"Bad Reputation"	4:16

== Singles ==
1. Off My Rocker At The Art School Bop (B-side: The Best Artist/Skinny White Girls)
