= Samuel Ladyman =

Anglican priest

Samuel Ladyman (3 March 1643 – 23 February 1684) was an Anglican priest in Ireland.

Ladyman was born in Dinton, Buckinghamshire and received his education at Corpus Christi College, Oxford. Ladyman held the position of Archdeacon of Limerick from 1667 until his death.

Church of Ireland titles
Preceded by Samuel Elliott	Archdeacon of Limerick; 1667–1684	Succeeded by John Hartstonge
