= Break the Banks =

Studio album by Battle
- Released: September 3, 2007
- Genre: Indie rock
- Label: Transgressive

Battle chronology
Back to Earth (2006)	Break the Banks (2007)

Professional ratings
Review scores
Source	Rating
Rocklouder	3/5 stars
Yahoo Music UK	6/10 stars

Break the Banks is the first and only LP from London-based indie rock band Battle. It was released on September 3, 2007.

== Track listing ==
All songs written by Jason Bavanandan. All music written by Jason Bavanandan, Oliver Davies, James Ellis, Timothy Scudder.

1. "The Longest Time" – 4:33
2. "Negotiation" – 3:34
3. "Demons" – 4:04
4. "Paper Street" – 3:58
5. "North Sea" – 3:48
6. "Looking for Bullets" – 4:27
7. "History" – 3:29
8. "The Time for Talking Is Almost Over" – 2:39
9. "Sit With Me" – 5:02
10. "The Other Way" – 4:12
