= Baader Meinhof (album) =

Studio album by Baader Meinhof
- Released: 9 September 1996
- Genres: Pop, rock
- Length: 31:11
- Label: Hut Records
- Producers: Luke Haines & Phil Vinall

Baader Meinhof is a 1996 album by Luke Haines, under the pseudonym Baader Meinhof. The name is taken from two of the main members of the Red Army Faction, Andreas Baader and Ulrike Meinhof, and the album, composed of 10 tracks, tells the history of group, since the ideas that might have inspired the group (in the first track, there's a quote from the student movement leader Rudi Dutschke: "Rudi said 'we got to be wise and we got to get armed'"), their first actions ("Burn Warehouse Burn"), their travel to Jordan ("Meet Me at the Airport"), their capture, the hijacking of a Lufthansa airplane by the members of the "second generation" of the RAF, in 1977 (one of the events that marked the German Autumn) ("Mogadishu").

In 2014, British independent record label 3 Loop Music re-released the album on heavyweight 180gsm vinyl and as an Expanded CD Edition which included four remixes from a previously unreleased EP.

== Background ==
After the commercial failure of the Auteurs' After Murder Park (1996), and the release of the Kid's Issue EP in May 1996, the band broke up. Frontman Luke Haines created the Baader Meinhof project, named after the 1970s German organisation. An album was created based on the After Murder Park track "Tombstone".

== Composition ==
The album is notable for its funk synth bass to evoke 1970s peak period of Red Army Faction activity. As well as the use of tabla and Middle Eastern-sounding strings in reference to the Red Army Faction's collaboration with the Popular Front for the Liberation of Palestine. Demonstrating a far more experimental edge than Haines's previous albums with The Auteurs.

== Reception ==
Professional ratings
Review scores
Source	Rating
AllMusic	3/5 stars
Alternative Rock	9/10
NME	5/10
Record Collector	3/5 stars
Robert Christgau	2/5 stars
Rolling Stone	3/5 stars

In a retrospective review, Jake Kennedy of Record Collector considered it one of Haines' best releases that "stands the test of time remarkably well". Author Dave Thompson, in his book Alternative Rock (2000), called it a "jarring collection which lived up to both its maker's reputation and its own pretentions." He added: "Simultaneously miles removed from, and inextricably involved with the parent concern; sensually sinister and bitterly poppy; terrorist pop of the highest measure."

== Track listing ==
1. "Baader Meinhof" – 3:01
2. "Meet Me at the Airport" – 2:50
3. "There's Gonna Be an Accident" – 3:25
4. "Mogadishu" – 3:38
5. "Theme from "Burn Warehouse Burn"" – 1:37
6. "GSG - 29" – 2:58
7. "....It's a Moral Issue" – 3:24
8. "Back on the Farm" – 3:53
9. "Kill Ramirez" – 3:26
10. "Baader Meinhof" – 2:56

== See also ==
- England Made Me – the debut album from Black Box Recorder, Haines' next project
