= The Auteurs =

English alternative rock band

- Origin: London, England
- Genres: Alternative rock; indie pop; baroque pop; Britpop; neo-glam
- Years active: 1991–1999
- Labels: Virgin Records, Hut Records
- Spinoffs: Black Box Recorder
- Past members: Luke Haines; Alice Readman; Glenn Collins; James Banbury; Barny C. Rockford

The Auteurs were an English alternative rock band of the 1990s, and a vehicle for songwriter Luke Haines (guitar, piano and vocals).

== History ==
Formerly a member of the Servants, Haines created the Auteurs with his then-girlfriend Alice Readman on bass guitar, former classmate Glenn Collins on drums, and later added James Banbury on cello.

The Auteurs demo tape and gig led to the band gaining a recording contract with Hut. Their first single "Show Girl" was praised by the British music magazine Melody Maker and the album New Wave (1993) was nominated for a Mercury Music Prize. The Auteurs later became associated with the Britpop movement. However this association was not liked by Haines, who frequently made derogatory remarks about his peers. After New Wave, the band remained on the fringes of the music scene. Drummer Glen Collins was replaced by Barny C. Rockford, after being headhunted from Out of My Hair by producer Phil Vinall. Their next album Now I'm a Cowboy (1994), built on the themes of New Wave and contained Haines' best known song, "Lenny Valentino". Demonstrating, again, their difference from their musical peers, the band's next release was The Auteurs vs. μ-Ziq, Auteurs songs remixed by producer μ-Ziq (aka Michael Paradinas). In interviews at the time Haines claimed he found contemporary techno and house music more interesting than most Britpop bands.

In 1996, The Auteurs released After Murder Park, produced by Steve Albini, and it included "Land Lovers", "Unsolved Child Murder", and "Buddha". The album was recorded at Abbey Road Studios following a year during which Haines had spent most of his time in a wheelchair after jumping off a wall. Haines made the Baader Meinhof album as a solo artist under the name Baader Meinhof, using some musicians from the Auteurs. The Auteurs supported Baader Meinhof at a London show in Camden's Dingwalls. The last Auteurs record, How I Learned to Love the Bootboys, was released in 1999. Alice Readman left the band around the time of the last album, and was replaced by various musicians for live/touring purposes.

== Post-breakup ==
Haines worked as one third of the art-pop band Black Box Recorder. In 2001 he released the soundtrack album to the film Christie Malry's Own Double-Entry, rapidly followed by his first solo album proper, The Oliver Twist Manifesto. 2003 saw him release Das Capital, a collection of re-recorded Auteurs era songs, with a couple of new tracks, apparently intended as closure for that band.

Banbury went on to record an album with Paul Morley under the name Infantjoy, entitled Where the Night Goes featuring a vocal performance by Sarah Nixey of Black Box Recorder singing a version of Japan's "Ghosts". An Infantjoy album – With – was released in 2006 with collaborators including Tunng, Isan and Populous.

In January 2009, Haines released a book entitled Bad Vibes, which serves dually as an autobiographical account of his years with the Auteurs, and as a record of the Britpop movement of the 1990s. Throughout the book, he never refers to James Banbury by name, referring to him simply as "the Cellist", although he is named in full in the acknowledgements. Banbury later worked with Pete Davis under the name Dadahack. Their debut album TAP3 was a hybrid cassette/mp3 playing device and was released in April 2010.

In 2014, British independent label 3 Loop Music re-released all of the Auteurs' albums (along with Haines' "Baader Meinhoff" album) as expanded editions which featured b-sides, demos, radio session tracks, live recordings and remixes. New Wave and Baader Meinhoff were also re-released by the label on heavyweight 180gsm vinyl.

== Members ==
- Luke Haines - guitar, piano, vocals (1991-1999)
- Alice Readman - bass guitar (1991-1999)
- Glenn Collins - drums (1991-1993)
- James Banbury - cello, keyboards (1993-1999)
- Barny C. Rockford - drums (1994-1999)

== Discography ==
=== Studio albums ===
- New Wave (1993) – UK No. 35
- Now I'm a Cowboy (1994) – UK No. 27
- After Murder Park (1996) – UK No. 53
- How I Learned to Love the Bootboys (1999) – UK No. 114

=== EPs ===
- Live Acoustic EP (1993)
- The Auteurs Vs. μ-Ziq (remixes), (1994)
- Back with the Killer (1995) – UK No. 45
- Kids Issue (1996) – UK No. 163

=== Singles ===
- "Show Girl" (1992)
- "Housebreaker"/"Valet Parking" (1993)
- "How Could I Be Wrong" (10 May 1993)
- "New French Girlfriend" (1993)
- "Lenny Valentino" (22 November 1993) – UK No. 41
- "Chinese Bakery" (8 April 1994) – UK No. 42
- "Light Aircraft on Fire" (9 February 1996) – UK No. 58
- "The Rubettes" (5 July 1999) – UK No. 66
