= Hut Records =

English record label

VC Recordings trading as Hut Records was a British record label brand which was started in 1990 as a wholly owned subsidiary of Virgin Records. Despite being wholly owned by a major label, it was classed as an independent label for the purposes of the UK Indie Chart due to the independent distribution, which was used by Virgin as a means of gaining exposure for new acts.

The label was managed by former Virgin retail assistant and Rough Trade label manager Dave Boyd, and it was originally set up as means of obtaining independent distribution for Moose and Revolver. Boyd persuaded the Virgin management to give the label complete creative control. Hut expanded by licensing The Smashing Pumpkins from Caroline Records, with Boyd convincing Caroline that Hut could do a better job of promoting their Gish album than Caroline's UK arm. The next band to be signed were Verve, whose "She's a Superstar" reached number one on the indie chart. Boyd's approach was to sign "quality bands and artists with attitude" like These Animal Men, Smash and The Auteurs.

Hut Records was discontinued by Virgin Records in mid-2004 due to an overhaul of the group, 20% of the artists on Hut were dropped whilst the rest were moved to other labels within the EMI Group.

== Groups or musicians associated with Hut ==
This is a list of musicians who have at one time been signed to Hut.

- Acetone
- The Burn
- Crackout
- The Crescent
- Daryll-Ann
- David Gray
- David McAlmont
  - McAlmont & Butler (with Bernard Butler to Chrysalis)
  - Thieves
- Drop Nineteens
- Embrace (from Hut to Independiente Records)
- Gomez (from Hut to Independiente)
- Heron
- Hobotalk
- James Iha
- Jepp
- Jon Spencer Blues Explosion
- Luke Haines
  - The Auteurs
  - Baader Meinhof
- Marianne Faithfull
- Moose
- The Music
- Neneh Cherry (from Virgin to Hut)
- One Inch Punch
- The Origin
- Placebo (from Hut to Virgin)
- Revolver
- Richard Ashcroft (from Hut to Parlophone and then Righteous Phonographic Association Label)
- Royal Trux
- The Smashing Pumpkins
- Stephanie Kirkham
- These Animal Men
- Toiling Midgets
- Urban Dance Squad
- The Verve (from Hut to Parlophone)
- Whale
- μ-ziq
