= Liberty X discography =

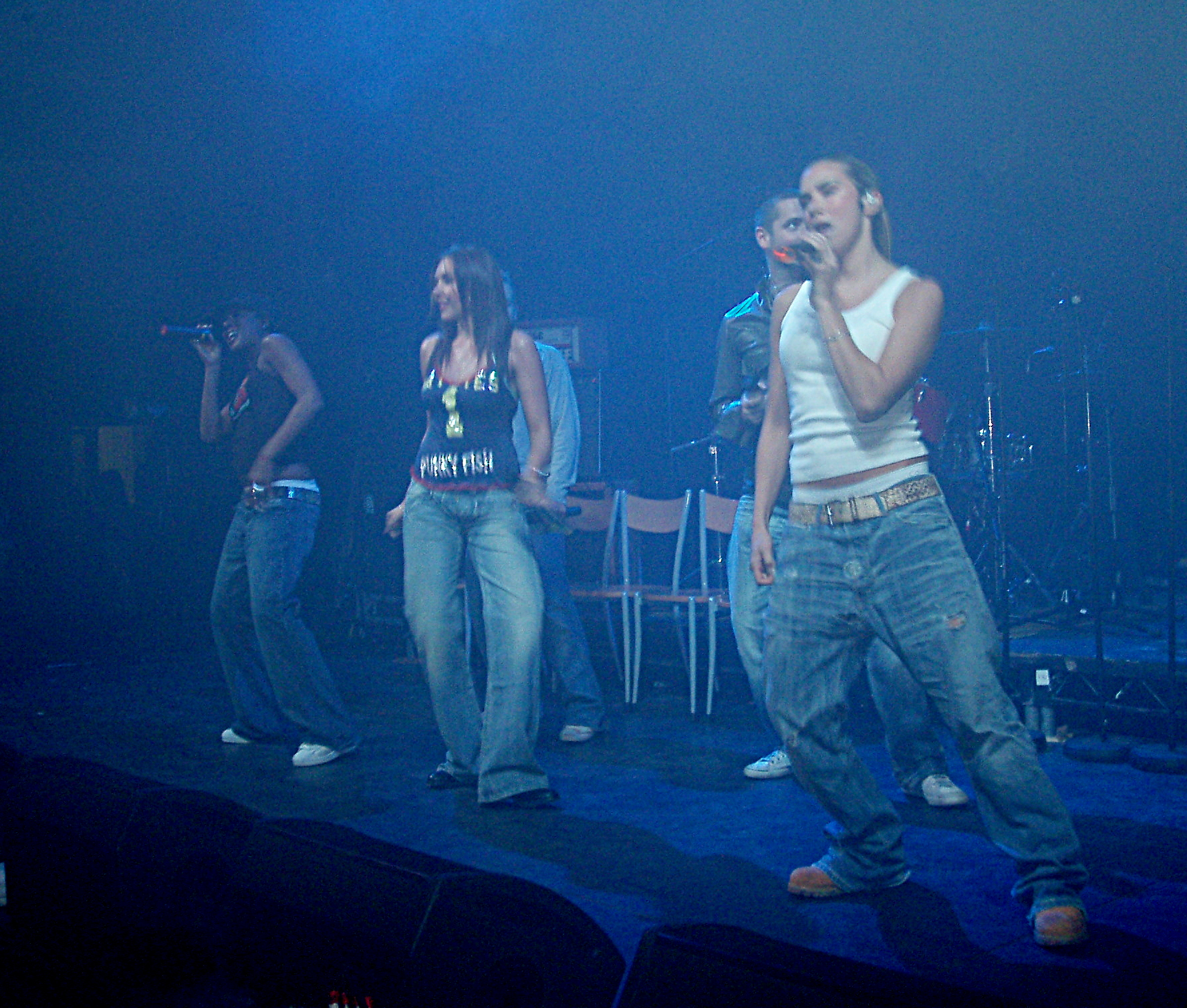
- Liberty X at Aberystwyth University May Ball 2006
- Studio albums: 3
- Singles: 13
- Music videos: 13

The discography of Liberty X, a British pop band, consists of three studio albums, twelve singles and a number of other appearances. The group's first two singles "Thinking It Over" and "Doin' It" launched them to fame, "Thinking It Over" shot to number 5 and "Doin' It" peaked at number 14. Their third single, "Just a Little" took the band straight to the top of the UK charts, next single "Got to Have Your Love" peaked at number two. This release was preceded by their debut album, Thinking It Over peaking at number 3 in the UK. The final single to be taken from the album was "Holding On for You", released in December 2002 and which debuted and peaked at number 5.

Following a short break, the group released "Being Nobody", a mashup of Chaka Khan's "Ain't Nobody" and The Human League's "Being Boiled". "Being Nobody" reached number three in the UK singles chart. Preceding their second album, Being Somebody, the group released "Jumpin", which managed to peak at number 6. Being Somebody was released on 3 November 2003, debuting at number 12 on the UK Albums Chart. The group released the album's final single "Everybody Cries" in January 2004. The single missed the UK Top 10, reaching a disappointing number 13. The group were to re-release Being Somebody, and was to feature a cover version of the Kool & the Gang song "Fresh" which was released in a selection of European countries, but not the UK. It peaked at number 35 on the French music charts.

Their third album, X, was released in October 2005. The first single, "Song 4 Lovers", reached number 5; the album peaked at number 27. The second single, "A Night to Remember", a cover of the Shalamar classic, entered and peaked at number 6 in the official British singles chart; it also peaked at number 16 in France, their biggest hit there since "Just a Little". The third single was a slightly remixed "X". The song failed to hit the Top 40, peaking at a low number 47. "X" also peaked at number 89 in France, their lowest chart placing there, just ahead of "Holding On for You", which reached number 109.

In 2012 the group reformed for The Big Reunion, an ITV2 series showing them rehearsing for a one-off comeback performance in 2013. Three members of the group, Michelle Heaton, Jessica Taylor and Kelli Young, have continued as a girl group.

== Albums ==
=== Studio albums ===
List of albums, with selected chart positions and certifications
Title	Album details	Peak chart positions							Sales	Certifications
Title	Album details	UK	EUR	FRA	IRE	NL	NZ	SWI	Sales	Certifications
Thinking It Over	Released: 27 May 2002; Label: V2	3	11	101	23	52	25	71	UK: 693,000; WW: 1,000,000	BPI: 2× Platinum
Being Somebody	Released: 3 November 2003; Label: V2	12	54	195	54	—	—	—	UK: 200,000	BPI: Gold
X	Released: 27 October 2005; Label: Virgin	27	—	—	—	—	—	—		
"—" denotes releases that did not chart or were not released in that territory.

=== Compilation albums ===
List of albums
Title	Album details
Super Hits!	Released: 2 February 2004 (Japan); Label: V2
Deluxe Liberty X Collection	Released: 11 November 2012; Label: One Media iP

== Singles ==
=== As main artist ===
List of singles, with selected chart positions and certifications
Title	Year	Peak chart positions										Certifications	Album
Title	Year	UK	AUS	BEL	FIN	FRA	GER	IRE	NL	NZ	SWI	Certifications	Album
"Thinking It Over"	2001	5	81	—	—	—	—	29	—	—	—		Thinking It Over
"Doin' It"	2001	14	—	—	—	—	—	—	—	—	—		Thinking It Over
"Just a Little"	2002	1	4	11	—	12	24	2	3	2	16	BPI: Platinum; ARIA: Platinum; SNEP: Silver; RMNZ: Gold	Thinking It Over
"Got to Have Your Love"	2002	2	75	54	—	—	—	8	12	39	—		Thinking It Over
"Holding On for You"	2002	5	—	65	—	—	78	20	31	—	47		Thinking It Over
"Being Nobody" (with Richard X)	2003	3	36	26	—	88	79	9	31	49	—		Being Somebody
"Jumpin"	2003	6	78	53	17	56	—	16	44	—	—		Being Somebody
"Everybody Cries"	2004	13	—	—	—	—	—	24	—	—	—		Being Somebody
"Song 4 Lovers"	2005	5	76	53	—	—	—	5	—	—	—		X
"A Night to Remember"	2005	6	94	92	—	—	—	19	—	—	—		X
"X"	2006	47	—	—	—	—	—	41	—	—	—		X
"—" denotes releases that did not chart or were not released in that territory.

=== As featuring artist ===
List of singles, with selected chart positions and certifications
Title	Year	Peak chart positions		Album
Title	Year	FRA	IRE	Album
"Fresh" (Kool & the Gang featuring Liberty X)	2004	35	—	The Hits: Reloaded
"I Wish It Could Be Christmas Everyday" (among The Big Reunion cast)	2013	13	82	—N/a
"—" denotes releases that did not chart or were not released in that territory.

=== Promotional singles ===
List of singles
Title	Year	Album
"Wanting Me Tonight"	2002	Thinking It Over

== Other appearances ==
List of singles
Title	Year	Other(s) artist(s)	Album
"No Clouds"	2001	—N/a	J-17 Selecta
"Everyday"	2001	—N/a	Smash! Hits – The Powerpuff Girls
"I'll Be Remembering"	2004	—N/a	Glamour Hits
"Forever"	2004	—N/a	Vibes
"Rock the Party"	2006	Benzino and Lil' Kim	Cut Up or Shut Up

== Videography ==
=== Video albums ===
List of albums, with selected chart positions
Title	Album details	Peak
Title	Album details	UK
Just a Little...	Released: 29 September 2003; Formats: DVD, digital download; Label: V2	3

=== Music videos ===
Title	Year	Director
"Thinking It Over"	2001	Alex Hemming
"Doin' It"	2001	Alex Hemming
"Just a Little"	2002	Alex Hemming & Shay Ola
"Got to Have Your Love"	2002	Alex Hemming & Shay Ola
"Holding On for You"	2002	Katie Bell
"Being Nobody"	2003	Paul Gore & Urban Stróm
"Jumpin"	2003	Masashi Muto
"Everybody Cries"	2004	Paul Gore
"Fresh"	2004	Franck Percher
"Song 4 Lovers"	2005	Bill Schacht
"A Night to Remember"	2005	Alex Hemming
"X"	2006	Mike Unwin
"I Wish It Could Be Christmas Everyday"	2013	—N/a
