= Popstars (British TV series) discography =

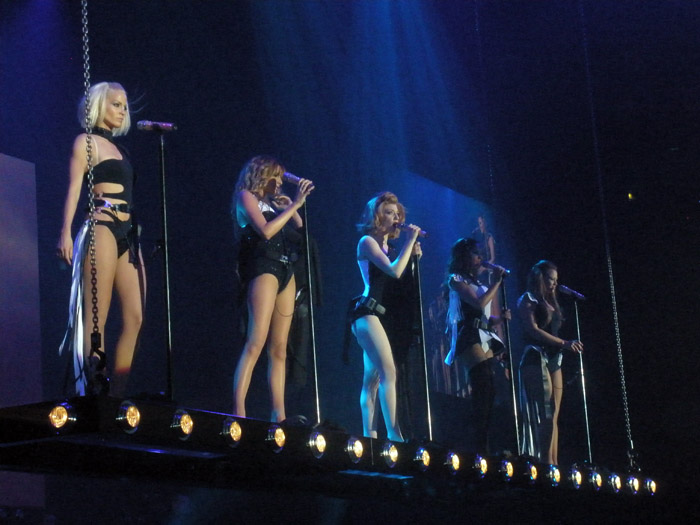
Girls Aloud are the most successful group to appear on the programme, scoring four number-one singles and two number-one albums.

Popstars (UK) is a British reality television show produced for ITV that aired for two series. The first series, Popstars, aimed to find five singers to form a new pop group. During the second series, Popstars: The Rivals, two music groups were formed to compete for the Christmas number-one single in the United Kingdom.

The five winning contestants from the first series formed the group Hear'Say. Their first two singles, "Pure and Simple" and "The Way to Your Love", became number-one hits on the UK Singles Chart. Two other single releases, "Everybody" and "Lovin' Is Easy", reached the top ten. Hear'Say released their first album Popstars in May 2001; this was followed by a second album, Everybody. After a line-up change, the group split a year after formation.

In the second series, two new groups, Girls Aloud and One True Voice, were formed. They competed for the Christmas number-one in 2002 with their debut singles "Sound of the Underground" and "Sacred Trust / After You're Gone" respectively; Girls Aloud finished on top and debuted at number one, and One True Voice debuted at number two. One True Voice released another single, "Shakespeare's (Way with) Words" before splitting in June 2003. Girls Aloud, in contrast, have become one of the most successful female groups in the United Kingdom, with 21 successive top-ten singles (including four number-ones), and six top-ten albums (including two number-ones). During the group's three-year hiatus, Cheryl Cole, Nadine Coyle, and Nicola Roberts also went on to release solo material. Girls Aloud reunited to celebrate their tenth anniversary in 2012.

In addition to the winners of the show, several other participants have achieved careers in music. Liberty X (originally known as Liberty before a legal dispute) has had eight top ten singles in the UK charts, including the number-one hit "Just a Little" in 2002. Kym Marsh released a solo album and two singles after leaving Hear'Say, and Darius Danesh, who did not advance past the audition stage, released material after appearing on Pop Idol. Javine Hylton, the singer who missed out on a place in Girls Aloud, debuted at number four with "Real Things and released several other singles. She was selected as the United Kingdom's entry for the 2005 Eurovision Song Contest, singing "Touch My Fire". The four other female finalists formed the band Clea, and the five losing male finalists experienced success in their band Phixx. The Cheeky Girls, a Romanian duo who did not make the live finals, were given a record contract, and debuted at number three behind the two winning bands.

== Singles ==
| Artist(s) | Series | Position in Show | Song title(s) | Release date | UK peak chart position | Ref |
|---|---|---|---|---|---|---|
| Hear'Say | 1 | Winner | "Pure and Simple" | 12 March 2001 | 1 | |
| Hear'Say | 1 | Winner | "The Way to Your Love" | 25 June 2001 | 1 | |
| Hear'Say | 1 | Winner | "Everybody" | 26 November 2001 | 4 | |
| Hear'Say | 1 | Winner | "Lovin' Is Easy" | 12 August 2002 | 6 | |
| Liberty ^{[D]} | 1 | Runner-Up | "Thinking It Over" | 24 September 2001 | 5 | |
| Liberty ^{[D]} | 1 | Runner-Up | "Doin' It" | 3 December 2001 | 14 | |
| Liberty X | 1 | Runner-Up | "Just a Little" | 13 May 2002 | 1 | |
| Liberty X | 1 | Runner-Up | "Got to Have Your Love" | 9 September 2002 | 2 | |
| Liberty X | 1 | Runner-Up | "Holding On for You" | 2 December 2002 | 5 | |
| Liberty X | 1 | Runner-Up | "Being Nobody" ^{[E]} | 24 March 2003 | 3 | |
| Liberty X | 1 | Runner-Up | "Jumpin" | 20 October 2003 | 6 | |
| Liberty X | 1 | Runner-Up | "Everybody Cries" | 12 January 2004 | 13 | |
| Liberty X | 1 | Runner-Up | "Song 4 Lovers" | 26 September 2005 | 5 | |
| Liberty X | 1 | Runner-Up | "A Night to Remember" | 14 November 2005 | 6 | |
| Liberty X | 1 | Runner-Up | "X" | 19 June 2006 | 47 | |
| Claire Freeland | 1 | N/A | "Free" | 21 July 2001 | 44 | |
| Kevin Simm | 1 | Runner-Up (with Liberty X) | "All You Good Friends" | 9 April 2016 | 24 | |
| Kym Marsh ^{[C]} | 1 | Winner (with Hear'Say) | "Cry" | 6 April 2003 | 2 | |
| Kym Marsh ^{[C]} | 1 | Winner (with Hear'Say) | "Come On Over" | 7 July 2003 | 10 | |
| Kym Marsh ^{[C]} | 1 | Winner (with Hear'Say) | "Sentimental" | 27 October 2003 | 35 | |
| Warren Stacey | 1 | Eliminated at Boot Camp | "My Girl, My Girl" | 11 March 2002 | 26 | |
| Girls Aloud | 2 | Winner (Girl Group) | "Sound of the Underground" | 16 December 2002 | 1 | |
| Girls Aloud | 2 | Winner (Girl Group) | "No Good Advice" | 12 May 2003 | 2 | |
| Girls Aloud | 2 | Winner (Girl Group) | "Life Got Cold" | 18 August 2003 | 3 | |
| Girls Aloud | 2 | Winner (Girl Group) | "Jump" | 17 November 2003 | 2 | |
| Girls Aloud | 2 | Winner (Girl Group) | "Love Machine" | 13 September 2004 | 2 | |
| Girls Aloud | 2 | Winner (Girl Group) | "I'll Stand by You" | 15 November 2004 | 1 | |
| Girls Aloud | 2 | Winner (Girl Group) | "The Show" | 28 June 2004 | 2 | |
| Girls Aloud | 2 | Winner (Girl Group) | "Wake Me Up" | 21 February 2005 | 4 | |
| Girls Aloud | 2 | Winner (Girl Group) | "Long Hot Summer" | 22 August 2005 | 7 | |
| Girls Aloud | 2 | Winner (Girl Group) | "Biology" | 14 November 2005 | 4 | |
| Girls Aloud | 2 | Winner (Girl Group) | "See the Day" | 19 December 2005 | 9 | |
| Girls Aloud | 2 | Winner (Girl Group) | "Whole Lotta History" | 13 March 2006 | 6 | |
| Girls Aloud | 2 | Winner (Girl Group) | "Something Kinda Ooooh" | 23 October 2006 | 3 | |
| Girls Aloud | 2 | Winner (Girl Group) | "I Think We're Alone Now" | 18 December 2006 | 4 | |
| Girls Aloud | 2 | Winner (Girl Group) | "Walk This Way" | 12 March 2007 | 1 | |
| Girls Aloud | 2 | Winner (Girl Group) | "Sexy! No No No..." | 31 August 2007 | 5 | |
| Girls Aloud | 2 | Winner (Girl Group) | "Call the Shots" | 26 November 2007 | 3 | |
| Girls Aloud | 2 | Winner (Girl Group) | "Theme to St. Trinian's" | 10 December 2007 | 51 | |
| Girls Aloud | 2 | Winner (Girl Group) | "Can't Speak French" | 14 March 2008 | 9 | |
| Girls Aloud | 2 | Winner (Girl Group) | "The Promise" | 19 October 2008 | 1 | |
| Girls Aloud | 2 | Winner (Girl Group) | "The Loving Kind" | 12 January 2009 | 10 | |
| Girls Aloud | 2 | Winner (Girl Group) | "Untouchable" | 27 April 2009 | 11 | |
| Girls Aloud | 2 | Winner (Girl Group) | "Something New" | 19 November 2012 | 2 | |
| Girls Aloud | 2 | Winner (Girl Group) | "Beautiful 'Cause You Love Me" | 17 December 2012 | 97 | |
| One True Voice | 2 | Winner (Boy Band) | "Sacred Trust / After You're Gone" | 16 December 2002 | 2 | |
| One True Voice | 2 | Winner (Boy Band) | "Shakespeare's (Way with) Words" | 2 June 2003 | 10 | |
| Cheeky Girls | 2 | Auditions | "Cheeky Song (Touch My Bum)" | 9 December 2002 | 2 | |
| Cheeky Girls | 2 | Auditions | "Take Your Shoes Off" | 5 May 2003 | 3 | |
| Cheeky Girls | 2 | Auditions | "(Hooray! Hooray! It's a Cheeky Holiday!)" | 4 August 2003 | 3 | |
| Cheeky Girls | 2 | Auditions | "Have a Cheeky Christmas" | 8 December 2003 | 10 | |
| Cheeky Girls | 2 | Auditions | "Cheeky Flamenco" | 27 September 2004 | 29 | |
| Cheeky Girls | 2 | Auditions | "Boys and Girls" | 6 December 2004 | 50 | |
| Clea | 2 | Runner-Up (Girl Group) | "Download It" | 22 September 2003 | 21 | |
| Clea | 2 | Runner-Up (Girl Group) | "Stuck in the Middle" | 16 February 2004 | 23 | |
| Clea | 2 | Runner-Up (Girl Group) | "We Don't Have to Take Our Clothes Off" ^{[F]} | 17 October 2005 | 35 | |
| Clea | 2 | Runner-Up (Girl Group) | "Lucky Like That" | 12 June 2006 | 55 | |
| Javine ^{[A]} | 2 | Runner-Up | "Real Things" | 7 July 2003 | 4 | |
| Javine ^{[A]} | 2 | Runner-Up | "Surrender (Your Love)" | 10 November 2003 | 15 | |
| Javine ^{[A]} | 2 | Runner-Up | "Best of My Love" | 14 June 2004 | 18 | |
| Javine ^{[A]} | 2 | Runner-Up | "Don't Walk Away" / "You've Got a Friend" | 9 August 2004 | 16 | |
| Javine ^{[A]} | 2 | Runner-Up | "Don't Walk Away" / "You've Got a Friend" | 9 August 2004 | 16 | |
| Javine ^{[A]} | 2 | Runner-Up | "Touch My Fire" | 16 May 2005 | 18 | |
| Javine ^{[A]} | 2 | Runner-Up | "Don't Let the Morning Come" ^{[B]} | 2 October 2006 | 49 | |
| Phixx | 2 | Runner-Up (Boy Band) | "Hold on Me" | 27 October 2003 | 10 | |
| Phixx | 2 | Runner-Up (Boy Band) | "Love Revolution" | 8 March 2004 | 13 | |
| Phixx | 2 | Runner-Up (Boy Band) | "Wild Boys" | 21 June 2004 | 12 | |
| Phixx | 2 | Runner-Up (Boy Band) | "Strange Love" | 24 January 2005 | 19 | |
| Cheryl | 2 | Winner (with Girls Aloud) | "Heartbreaker" | 5 May 2008 | 4 | |
| Cheryl | 2 | Winner (with Girls Aloud) | "Fight for This Love" | 19 October 2009 | 1 | |
| Cheryl | 2 | Winner (with Girls Aloud) | "3 Words" | 18 December 2009 | 4 | |
| Cheryl | 2 | Winner (with Girls Aloud) | "Parachute" | 11 March 2010 | 5 | |
| Cheryl | 2 | Winner (with Girls Aloud) | "Promise This" | 24 October 2010 | 1 | |
| Cheryl | 2 | Winner (with Girls Aloud) | "The Flood" | 2 January 2011 | 18 | |
| Cheryl | 2 | Winner (with Girls Aloud) | "Call My Name" | 10 June 2012 | 1 | |
| Cheryl | 2 | Winner (with Girls Aloud) | "Under the Sun" | 2 September 2012 | 13 | |
| Cheryl | 2 | Winner (with Girls Aloud) | "Crazy Stupid Love" | 18 July 2014 | 1 | |
| Cheryl | 2 | Winner (with Girls Aloud) | "I Don't Care" | 2 November 2014 | 1 | |
| Cheryl | 2 | Winner (with Girls Aloud) | "Only Human" | 18 October 2014 | 70 | |
| Cheryl | 2 | Winner (with Girls Aloud) | "Love Made Me Do It" | 9 November 2018 | 19 | |
| Cheryl | 2 | Winner (with Girls Aloud) | "Let You" | 31 May 2019 | 57 | |
| Nadine Coyle | 2 | Winner (with Girls Aloud) | "Insatiable" | 31 October 2010 | 26 | |
| Nicola Roberts | 2 | Winner (with Girls Aloud) | "Beat of My Drum" | 2 June 2011 | 27 | |
| Nicola Roberts | 2 | Winner (with Girls Aloud) | "Lucky Day" | 16 September 2011 | 40 | |
| Nicola Roberts | 2 | Winner (with Girls Aloud) | "Yo-Yo" | 6 January 2012 | 111 | |

== Albums ==
Only albums that charted in the Top 100 of the UK albums chart are included in this list.

| Artist | Series | Album title | Release date | UK peak chart position | Ref(s) |
|---|---|---|---|---|---|
| Hear'Say | 1 | Popstars | 26 March 2001 | 1 | |
| Hear'Say | 1 | Everybody | 2 December 2001 | 24 | |
| Liberty X | 1 | Thinking It Over | 27 May 2002 | 3 | |
| Liberty X | 1 | Being Somebody | 3 November 2003 | 12 | |
| Liberty X | 1 | X | 10 October 2005 | 27 | |
| Kym Marsh | 1 | Standing Tall | 21 July 2003 | 9 | |
| Myleene Klass | 1 | Moving On | 20 October 2003 | 32 | |
| Girls Aloud | 2 | Sound of the Underground | 26 May 2003 | 2 | |
| Girls Aloud | 2 | What Will the Neighbours Say? | 29 November 2004 | 6 | |
| Girls Aloud | 2 | Chemistry | 5 December 2005 | 11 | |
| Girls Aloud | 2 | The Sound of Girls Aloud: The Greatest Hits | 29 October 2007 | 1 | |
| Girls Aloud | 2 | Tangled Up | 19 November 2007 | 4 | |
| Girls Aloud | 2 | Mixed Up ^{[H]} | 19 November 2007 | 56 | |
| Girls Aloud | 2 | Out of Control | 3 November 2008 | 1 | |
| Girls Aloud | 2 | Girls A Live ^{I} | 26 May 2003 | 29 | |
| Girls Aloud | 2 | Ten | 26 November 2012 | 9 | |
| Cheeky Girls | 2 | PartyTime | 11 August 2003 | 14 | |
| Javine | 2 | Surrender | 28 June 2004 | 73 | |
| Cheryl Cole | 2 | 3 Words | 26 October 2009 | 1 | |
| Cheryl Cole | 2 | Messy Little Raindrops | 29 October 2010 | 1 | |
| Cheryl Cole | 2 | A Million Lights | 18 June 2012 | 2 | |
| Cheryl Cole | 2 | Only Human | 14 November 2014 | 7 | |
| Kimberley Walsh | 2 | Centre Stage | 4 February 2013 | 18 | |
| Nadine Coyle | 2 | Insatiable | 8 November 2010 | 47 | |
| Nicola Roberts | 2 | Cinderella's Eyes | 26 September 2011 | 17 | |

== Other releases ==
- Liberty X recorded a version of Kool and the Gang's "Fresh", which charted at number 58 on the Australian Singles Chart.
- In addition to recording her own solo album following the split of Hear'Say, Myleene Klass signed a deal with EMI Classics which allowed her to choose her own tracks for a series of classical albums. She recorded two songs each for Music for Romance and Music for Mothers.
- Darius Danesh appeared on the first series but was eliminated at the audition stage. He reached the final three in Pop Idol and had a succession of hit singles.
- Clea released two albums, Identity Crisis and Trinity; the former was released only in Russia and the latter charted at number 258 on the UK Albums Chart. They also re-released "Stuck in the Middle" in 2006 as a joint single with "I Surrender", but the song failed to chart.

== See also ==
- Fame Academy discography
- Pop Idol discography
- The X Factor (UK) discography

== Notes ==
- ^{a} Javine Hylton is known professionally by her first name only. She was due to release a song with the producer Richard X but the single was cancelled.
- ^{b} "Don't Let the Morning Come" was a collaboration with Soul Avengerz.
- ^{c} Kym Marsh continued to be known professionally by this name despite her marriage to Jack Ryder. She was originally a part of the band Hear'Say
- ^{d} Liberty X were originally known as Liberty but changed their name in 2002. This was following a high-profile court case where another UK band with the same name claimed that their name was being used without permission. Readers of The Sun chose the name X Liberty but the band decided to call themselves Liberty X.
- ^{e} "Being Nobody" was credited as Richard X vs. Liberty X.
- ^{f} Clea recorded "We Don't Have to Take Our Clothes Off" with Da Playaz and the release was credited as Da Playaz vs. Clea.
- ^{g} "Walk This Way" was released by Girls Aloud in collaboration with fellow British girl group Sugababes as the Comic Relief single in 2007, charting at number-one.
- ^{h} Girls Aloud's album Mixed Up was a bonus CD offered exclusively at Woolworths which contained remixes of the Tangled Up album tracks.
- ^{i} Girls A Live is a live album to accompany Out of Control that was initially available at Woolworths.
- ^{j} Cheryl Cole was credited on the release of will.i.am's 2008 single "Heartbreaker" as having sung backing vocals.
