= X (Liberty X album) =

Studio album by Liberty X
- Released: 10 October 2005
- Recorded: April 2004 – August 2005
- Studios: London, England
- Genres: Pop; dance; R&B
- Length: 53:14
- Labels: Unique Corp Records; Virgin
- Producers: The BigPockets; Peter Biker; Delgado; Johnny Douglas; Rod Gammons; Goldust; Tony Lundon; Jud Mahoney; Zach Charlton; Pete "Boxsta" Martin; Lucas Secon; Richard X

Liberty X chronology
Being Somebody (2003)	X (2005)

Singles from X
- 1. "Song 4 Lovers" Released: 26 September 2005; 2. "A Night to Remember" Released: 14 November 2005; 3. "X" Released: 19 June 2006

X is the third and final studio album to be released by British-Irish pop group Liberty X, released on 10 October 2005. The album was the band's first release on the Virgin Records label, after being dropped from V2 Records in 2004. The album was released two years after their previous album, Being Somebody. The album was the least successful of their three studio albums, only peaking at number 27 on the UK Albums Chart and selling less than 50,000 copies.

== Background ==
After being dropped from the V2 Records label, Liberty X were quick to sign a record deal with independent label Unique Corp Records, and began recording their third studio album. The label decided the group should experiment with their sound, and thus, enlisted the help of their long-time collaborators Goldust and Lucas Secon, as well as working with new collaborators, including Jud Mahoney, Pete "Boxsta" Martin and Johnny Douglas. The group also enlisted the help of rapper Rev Run, who features on the album's first single, "Song 4 Lovers", which was written and produced by group member Tony Lundon. For the track, Lundon experimented with the gospel and soul areas of music, as well as venturing into hip hop with the feature of Rev Run on the track. The group also decided to include four of their old classic hits as bonus tracks at the end of the album.

The album's second single, "A Night to Remember", a cover of the Shalamar original, was released on 14 November 2005, as the official Children in Need single of the year. It was also backed with another cover of a disco track, "Everybody Dance" written by Nile Rodgers and Bernard Edwards. Neither "A Night to Remember" nor "Everybody Dance" feature on the original edition of the album, they are only listed as the album's second single due to their inclusion on the Xtra Edition. From January 2006, the group began touring the album on a small, theatre tour across the United Kingdom. Once the tour was complete, the group returned to film a music video for the track "X", which was released as the album's third and final single on 19 June 2006. Despite the release of a new single and a re-issue of the album entitled the Xtra Edition released two weeks later featuring "A Night to Remember" and "Everybody Dance", the album only managed to peak at number 27.

An Australian edition of the album, packaged with a bonus DVD containing several of the group's music videos, became the group's last ever official release anywhere in the world. "It's OK" and "Everybody Dance" were omitted from certain versions of the album for contractual reasons.

== Critical reception ==
Professional ratings
Review scores
Source	Rating
AllMusic	2/5 stars

AllMusic editor Jon O'Brien found that "X is unfortunately not a swan song reflective of Liberty X's capabilities. Unlike their debut, which managed to capture the pop/R&B zeitgeist effortlessly, X is bogged down by dated production, lifeless ballads, and clichéd attempts at hip-hop [...] The band is certainly one of the better pop groups of the early noughties, but instead of going out with a bang, they've gone out with a bit of a damp squib."

== Track listing ==
Standard edition
No.	Title	Writer(s)	Producer(s)	Length
1.	"X"	Tony Lundon; Kelli Young; Kevin Simm; Jessica Taylor; Johnny Douglas	Douglas	3:29
2.	"It's OK"	Mike Hamilton; Terri Walker; Peter Biker; Karsten Dahlgaard	Sven "Delgado" Kirschner; Biker	3:42
3.	"Song 4 Lovers" (featuring Rev Run of Run-D.M.C.)	Lundon; Rev Run; Grant Black; Benny Di Massa; Marlene Buck	Lundon	4:16
4.	"Then There Was You"	Lundon; Young; Jud Mahoney; Zach Charlton	Charlton; Mahoney	4:49
5.	"Shotgun"	Lucas Secon; Lundon; Young; Don-E	Secon	3:14
6.	"Yo DJ"	Charlton; Mahoney; Lundon; Young	Charlton; Mahoney	3:19
7.	"In My Bed"	Secon; Lundon; Taylor; Michelle Heaton	Secon	3:37
8.	"Dirty Cash"	Stevie Vincent; Mick Walsh	Pete Martin	3:36
9.	"Move Ya Body"	Charlton; Mahoney; Lundon; Simm; Young	Charlton; Mahoney	3:21
10.	"Divine Intervention"	Diane Warren	Goldust	3:46
11.	"Being Nobody" (featuring Richard X)	Phil Oakey; Ian Marsh; Martyn Ware; David Wolinski	Richard X	3:36
12.	"Got to Have Your Love" (radio edit)	Bryce Wilson; Kirk Khaleel; Johnny Rodriguez	Rod Gammons	3:52
13.	"Holding On for You" (B&Q mix)	Martin Prime; Simm; Lundon; Taylor; Young; Tim Laws; Frazer Hurrell	Laws	3:26
14.	"Just a Little"	Michelle Escoffery; George Hammond Hagan; John Hammond Hagan	The Big Pockets	3:55

Xtra edition bonus tracks
No.	Title	Writer(s)	Producer(s)	Length
11.	"A Night to Remember"	Nidra Beard; Dana Meyers; Charmaine Sylvers	Gammons	5:04
12.	"Everybody Dance"	Nile Rodgers; Bernard Edwards	Ian Curnow	5:01

Australian deluxe edition bonus DVD
No.	Title	Director(s)	Length
1.	"A Night to Remember"	Alex Hemming
2.	"Song 4 Lovers"	Bill Schacht
3.	"Being Nobody"	Paul Gore
4.	"Got to Have Your Love"	Alex Hemming
5.	"Holding On for You"	Katie Bell
6.	"Just a Little"	Alex Hemming

== Charts ==
Chart (2005)	Peak position
Irish Albums (IRMA)	49
Scottish Albums (Official Charts)	40
UK Albums (Official Charts)	27

== Release history ==
List of release dates, showing region, formats, label, and editions
Region	Date	Format(s)	Label	Edition(s)
Ireland	7 October 2005	CD; digital download	Virgin	Standard edition
United Kingdom	10 October 2005	CD; digital download	Virgin	Standard edition
United Kingdom	3 July 2006	CD; digital download	Virgin	Xtra edition
Australia	14 August 2006	CD+DVD	Virgin	Standard edition
