= Being Somebody =

Studio album by Liberty X
- Released: 18 October 2003
- Recorded: September 2002 – August 2003
- Studio: London, England
- Genre: Pop; dance; R&B
- Length: 62:36
- Label: V2
- Producer: The BigPockets; Grant Black; Niraj Chag; Magnus Fiennes; David Frank; Goldust; Mark Hill; Steve Kipner; Tony Lundon; Alex McLeod; Mike Peden; Chris Porter; Stuart Reid; Reza Safinia; Lucas Secon; Shep Soloman; Marius De Vries; Ronnie Wilson; Richard X

Liberty X chronology
Thinking It Over (2002)	Being Somebody (2003)	X (2005)

Singles from Being Somebody
- 1. "Being Nobody" Released: 17 March 2003; 2. "Jumpin'" Released: 12 October 2003; 3. "Everybody Cries" Released: 12 January 2004

Being Somebody is the second studio album by English-Irish pop vocal group Liberty X. It was released on 3 November 2003 via V2 Records. Arriving eighteen months after their debut album, Thinking It Over (2002), the record saw the group reunite with production teams The BigPockets and Goldust while expanding their creative network to include Richard X, Mark Hill, Mike Peden and Marius De Vries, among others. Band member Tony Lundon also took on a larger creative role, producing three tracks and solely writing one song, while his fellow group members contributed to the songwriting throughout the album.

Critical reception for Being Somebody was mixed to positive, with critics praising its polished R&B sound, strong singles and songwriting contributions, while criticizing its inconsistent quality, lack of clear direction and occasional overproduction. Commercially, the album achieved moderate success, debuting and peaking at number 12 on the UK Albums Chart to become Liberty X's second consecutive top-20 album, and was later certified Gold by the British Phonographic Industry (BPI) after selling 100,000 copies in the UK. The album spawned two UK top-10 singles, "Jumpin'" and the mashup single "Being Nobody."

== Background ==
The band returned to the studio shortly after the release of their debut effort, Thinking It Over, and began by recording a collaboration with producer Richard X – a mash-up of classic tracks "Being Boiled" and "Ain't Nobody", entitled "Being Nobody". As well as being released to promote the band's new album, it also served as the lead single from Richard X Presents His X-Factor Vol. 1. For their second studio effort, the band teamed up with producers Lucas Secon and Mike Peden, as well as allowing band member Tony Lundon to produce three tracks, one of which he solely wrote. "Being Nobody" was released as the album's lead single on 24 March 2003. "Jumpin", a track produced and co-written by Secon, was released as the album's second single over six months later, on 12 October 2003.

The album was released in Japan a week later on 18 October. The Japanese edition of the album features an alternative, white picture cover, and includes three additional tracks – "Just a Little", as the track remained previously unreleased in Japan, brand new Japanese exclusive track "Willing to Try" and the music video for "Jumpin'". "Everybody Cries" was released as the album's third single on 12 January 2004. In the midst of Being Somebody's promotion, the band released a cover of "Fresh" in collaboration with Kool & The Gang, which released the song originally. The song was recorded for their compilation album, The Hits: Reloaded. It was later released as a single on 14 April 2004, exclusively in France, Germany and Spain. "I'll Be Remembering" was planned as the equivalent single release to Fresh in the United Kingdom, however, by this time, the band's record contract with V2 Records had been terminated, and the single's release was cancelled, leaving "Fresh" as an internationally exclusive single.

The Japanese version of Being Somebody also uses an alternative version of the track "Whatcha Doin' Tonight", which also carries a slightly different title, "(Tell Me) What You're Doing Tonight". This version was originally recorded during the recording sessions for Thinking It Over. Four songs that failed to make the final cut of Being Somebody, "Bump & Grind", "Get Away", "Press Rewind" and "Wilder", were leaked to YouTube in April 2010. These tracks were also reportedly being considered for inclusion on the band's third V2 project, before they were dropped from the label. Several additional tracks from the album sessions were also released as B-sides: "Enemy", "Sunshine", "It Helps" and "Shake It".

== Critical reception ==
Professional ratings
Review scores
Source	Rating
AllMusic	3/5 stars
The Guardian	3/5 stars
RTÉ	3/5 stars
Yahoo! Music UK	8/10

Critics generally gave Being Somebody positive-to-mixed reviews, praising Liberty X's catchy pop/R&B sound, strong vocals, songwriting contributions, and growing confidence, while criticizing the album’s inconsistent direction, overlong tracklist, and tendency toward repetitive or overproduced songs. RTÉ editor Linda McGee viewed the album as evidence that the group had exceeded expectations for a manufactured pop act, commending its mix of energetic dance tracks and ballads as well as the members' increasing songwriting involvement. Similarly, Simon Evans of musicOMH considered the album proof that the group still had momentum, highlighting its strong pace and memorable pop hooks, particularly on the singles "Jumpin'" and "Being Nobody". Paul Taylor from the Manchester Evening News also praised the band's growing confidence and their shift toward a more commercial R&B sound, singling out "Being Nobody" and "The Poet" as highlights.

Reviewers additionally noted the group's maturation within the R&B genre. Dave Simpson of The Guardian described the record as showcasing an increasingly polished R&B style and praised the vocal performances, while also highlighting Tony Lundon's growing role as a songwriter. More mixed assessments focused on the album's consistency and length. Writing for Yahoo! Music UK, Simon P. Ward criticized the album's structure and consistency, arguing that while its opening tracks were strong, the record quickly declined into formulaic ballads and uneven production. He described several songs as generic or overproduced, suggesting the sequencing felt unfocused and overly long, with the 16-track runtime leading to fatigue and inconsistency. Denise Boyd of BBC Music felt that the record lacked a clear artistic direction, describing it as a "mish-mash", although she acknowledged the group's strengths on up-tempo R&B tracks and soulful ballads and argued that the album demonstrated their legitimacy beyond the manufactured-pop label. AllMusic editor Jon O'Brien similarly praised the band's songwriting contributions but felt that several tracks were repetitive and overproduced, resulting in an uneven listening experience. Taylor likewise criticized the 17-track running order as overly long, suggesting that the album would have benefited from tighter editing.

== Commercial performance ==
Being Somebody achieved moderate commercial success following the strong performance of Liberty X's debut album Thinking It Over (2002). The album debuted and peaked at number 12 on the UK Albums Chart, selling around 75,000 copies in its first week of release and becoming the group's second consecutive top-20 album. It also opened and peaked at number two on the UK Independent Albums Chart reached number 54 on the European Top 100 Albums chart, number 54 in Ireland, and number 195 in France. In the United Kingdom, Being Somebody sold approximately 100,000 copies and was certified Gold by the British Phonographic Industry (BPI).

== Track listing ==
Being Somebody track listing
No.	Title	Writer(s)	Producer(s)	Length
1.	"Intro (Being Somebody)"	Tony Lundon; Jessica Taylor; Lucas Secon; Maryanne Morgan	Secon	0:20
2.	"Jumpin'"	Mike Peden; Lucie Silvas; Charlie Russell	Peden	3:39
3.	"Being Nobody" (Richard X vs. Liberty X)	Phil Oakey; Ian Marsh; Martyn Ware; David Wolinski	Richard X	3:40
4.	"Everybody Cries"	Hannah Robinson; Pascal Gabriel	Marius De Vries	4:57
5.	"Watcha Doin' Tonight"	Taylor; Lundon; Secon; Morgan	Secon	3:18
6.	"The Poet"	Steve Kipner; David Frank; Pam Sheyne	Kipner; Frank	3:45
7.	"I'll Be Remembering"	Taylor; Lundon; Secon; Morgan	Secon	4:15
8.	"The Last Goodbye"	Lundon; Kevin Simm; Taylor; Kelli Young; Michelle Heaton; Mark Hill	Hill	4:07
9.	"Let Go"	Simm; Lundon; Young; Michael "Fingaz" Migisha; Chris Porter; Abdul "Skillz" Bello; Stuart Reid	Mugisha; Bello; Porter; Reid	3:13
10.	"Forever"	Lundon; Simm; Taylor; Young; Heaton; Niraj Chag	Chag	4:42
11.	"Close Your Eyes"	Simm; Lundon; Grant Black; Ronnie Wilson; Wayne Hernandez	Black; Wilson; Hernandez^{[A]}	3:10
12.	"I Just Wanna"	Simm; Lundon; Michael Harwood; Nick Keynes; Jon O'Mahony; Silvas	Goldust	3:55
13.	"Impossible"	Simm; Lundon; Taylor; Young; Heaton; Shep Soloman; David Shorten	Soloman; Magnus Fiennes	3:55
14.	"Take Me Home"	Simm; Lundon; Harwood; Keynes; O'Mahony; Silvas	Goldust	4:16
15.	"Story of My Life"	Simm; Lundon; Young; Reza Safinia; Connor Reeves	Safinia	3:36
16.	"Maybe"	Lundon	Lundon	4:23

European edition bonus track
No.	Title	Writer(s)	Producer(s)	Length
17.	"Where Do We Go From Here?"	Heaton; Taylor; Alex McLeod; Bandawe; Sintim	McLeod	4:22

Japanese edition bonus tracks
No.	Title	Writer(s)	Producer(s)	Length
17.	"Where Do We Go From Here?" (hidden track)	Heaton; Taylor; Alex McLeod; Bandawe; Sintim	McLeod	4:22
18.	"Just a Little"	Michelle Escoffery; George Hammond Hagan; John Hammond Hagan	The BigPockets	3:58
19.	"Willing to Try"	Young; Jemma Anderson; Terry Winstanley	Lundon	4:12
20.	"Jumpin'" (video)			4:18

Notes

- ^{^[A]} denotes co-producer

== Charts ==
Weekly chart performance for Being Somebody
Chart (2005)	Peak position
European Albums (Billboard)	54
French Albums (SNEP)	195
Irish Albums (IRMA)	54
Scottish Albums (OCC)	13
UK Albums (OCC)	12
UK Independent Albums (OCC)	2

== Certifications ==
Certifications for Being Somebody
Region	Certification	Certified units/sales
United Kingdom (BPI)	Gold	100,000^{^}
^{^} Shipments figures based on certification alone.
