= The Girls of FHM =

British novelty pop act

The Girls of FHM was a novelty pop act, manufactured by FHM magazine. They released two music videos: Rod Stewart's "Da Ya Think I'm Sexy?" (2004) and Divinyls's "I Touch Myself" (2007). Despite having singers as members, none of the girls sang and lead and backing vocals were provided by British singer Sue Quin. Profits were donated to Breakthrough Breast Cancer.

== Members ==
=== Vocals ===
- Sue Quin

=== Appearances of "Da Ya Think I'm Sexy?" ===
- Naomi Campbell
- Hannah Spearritt from S Club 7
- Tina Barrett from S Club 7
- Liz McClarnon from Atomic Kitten
- Jessica Taylor from Liberty X
- Kelli Young from Liberty X
- Michelle Heaton from Liberty X
- Lisa Scott-Lee from Steps
- Myleene Klass from Hear'Say
- Jakki Degg
- Jodie Marsh
- Michelle Marsh

=== Appearances of "I Touch Myself" ===
- Lady Isabella Hervey
- Sophie Anderton
- Nikki Sanderson
- Samia Ghadie
- Nush

== Music videos ==
The video is set in a bar at a fashion show, and was considered by the music industry to be a spoof of the fashion world. The video was filmed in Edgware, North London, and was directed by Phil Griffin. The vocals were recorded at AATW studios in Blackburn.

In 2007, a second video was released of a cover version of the Divinyls song "I Touch Myself".

== Discography ==
=== Singles ===
List of singles, with selected chart positions
Title	Year	Peak chart positions			Album
Title	Year	UK	IRL	SCO	Album
"Da Ya Think I'm Sexy?"	2004	10	25	8	non-album song
"I Touch Myself"	2007	34	—	—	non-album song
"—" denotes releases that did not chart or were not released in that territory.
