= X (Liberty X song) =

2006 single by Liberty X

Single by Liberty X

from the album X
- Released: 19 June 2006
- Length: 3:03 (album version); 2:51 (single mix)
- Label: Unique Corp Records; Virgin
- Songwriters: Johnny Douglas; Tony Lundon; Kevin Simm; Jessica Taylor; Kelli Young
- Producer: Johnny Douglas

Liberty X singles chronology
"A Night to Remember" (2005)	"X" (2006)	"I Wish It Could Be Christmas Everyday" (2013)

"X" is a song by English-Irish pop group Liberty X. It was released on 19 June 2006 as the third and final single from their third studio album X (2005). It was the written by band members Tony Lundon, Kelli Young, Jessica Taylor and Kevin Simm, alongside Johnny Douglas, and was the band's last single before the announcement of their split. and became their lowest-charting single of their career, only peaking at number 47 on the UK Singles Chart.

== Background ==
Following the release of Liberty X's Children in Need single, "A Night to Remember", it was announced that due to poor sales of their third album X, which sold just over 10,000 copies in the United Kingdom, that the band would extensively tour the album, in an attempt to promote the failing release. On 7 May 2006, the band were featured in the line up of Aberystwyth University May ball, alongside Chesney Hawkes and BodyRockers. However, their set was cut short when a smoke bomb was set off during the first two minutes, filling the room with smoke. Firefighters gave the all-clear after 50 minutes, but Liberty X failed to reappear. Students were told the band were not returning to finish their set, and this was met by jeers, as students had paid £37 for the evening.

== Music video ==
The music video for "X" was filmed on a budget of just £4,750, as revealed by Taylor during The Big Reunion, which was a considerably smaller budget compared to some of the band's other videos, such as the £200,000 budget given to the "Got to Have Your Love" video. The band later revealed that they believed the poor outcome of the video contributed to the single's overall chart position.

The video features the band performing the song atop a number of CGI buildings and structures, whilst fighting an evil record company boss, shown on a large TV screen atop a skyline skyscraper. At the time, it was reported that the video was a dig at the band's former manager Richard Branson, who dropped them after the "poor" chart position of "Everybody Cries", despite the single peaking at number 13 on the UK Singles Chart. The entire video was filmed against a green screen.

== Track listings ==
- UK CD single
1. "X" (Original Mix) – 3:03
2. "X" (Single Radio Edit) – 2:51
- UK DVD single
1. "X" (Original Mix) (Audio) – 3:23
2. "X" (Brooklyn Heights Remix) (Audio) – 5:34
3. "X" (Video) – 3:03
4. "Song 4 Lovers" (Video) – 3:00
5. "X" (Behind the Scenes) – 2:00

== Charts ==
Chart (2006)	Peak position
UK Singles (OCC)	47

== Release history ==
Region	Date	Format(s)	Label(s)	Ref.
United Kingdom	19 June 2006	CD single	Virgin	
