= Thinking It Over (album) =

Studio album by Liberty X
- Released: 27 May 2002
- Recorded: April 2001 – March 2002
- Studio: London, England
- Genre: Pop; dance; R&B
- Length: 53:58
- Label: V2
- Producer: David Brant; Pete Devereux; Steve Duberry; Rod Gammons; Goldust; Frazer Hurrell; K-Gee; Tim Laws; John McLaughlin; Mushtaq; The BigPockets; The Wideboys

Liberty X chronology
| Thinking It Over (2002) | Being Somebody (2003) |

Singles from Thinking It Over
- 1. "Thinking It Over" Released: 24 September 2001; 2. "Doin' It" Released: 3 December 2001; 3. "Just a Little" Released: 13 May 2002; 4. "Got to Have Your Love" Released: 9 September 2002; 5. "Holding On for You" Released: 2 December 2002

Thinking It Over is the debut studio album by British-Irish pop group Liberty X. Released on 27 May 2002 through V2 Records on the back of their success on the ITV television talent show, Popstars, the album was recorded in the year following the series' finale, where the band became runners-up to Hear'Say. Liberty X band members worked with a variety of producers on the album, including Pete Devereux, K-Gee, Goldust, The Wideboys, and Mushtaq.

Originally titled—and released in Japan as—To Those Who Wait, it was released in the United Kingdom on 27 May 2002 under its new title and became the biggest selling album of the band's career, selling nearly 750,000 copies. Five singles were released from the album: "Thinking It Over", "Doin' It", "Just a Little", "Got to Have Your Love" and "Holding On for You". "Just a Little" became Liberty X's only number-one single and won a BRIT Award for Best British Single in 2003.

== Background ==
The band began recording the album under their original name, Liberty, just two weeks after the finale of Popstars. The album's production was overseen by Steve Duberry, while the band co-wrote several songs with writer and producer Tim Laws. The album's lead single, "Thinking It Over", was released on 24 September 2001, to worldwide success, charting high in the United Kingdom, Japan and Europe. Due to its success, the band's record label decided to push the release of the album, then entitled To Those Who Wait, forward by three months, due to be released just four weeks later on 22 October. However, shortly after the announcement, it was revealed the band had become entangled in a legal dispute with a band of the same name, who claimed that the current group did not have the right to use the name Liberty, as it was already being used by another artist. Thus, this prevented the album being released in the United Kingdom as planned.

However, as the lawsuit didn't cover international territory, the Japanese side of the band's record label made the decision to go ahead with the album's release as planned, making To Those Who Wait available from 28 November 2001. The album contained fourteen tracks. Whilst still entangled in the lawsuit, the band released their second single, "Doin' It", on 10 December 2001. It failed to achieve the chart success of its predecessor, but still charted highly in the United Kingdom. On 18 February 2002, the lawsuit was settled, with the current group instead changing their name to Liberty X. It was then decided that the album would revamped for the British market, and the band returned to the studio to record new material. Three new songs were recorded, the first of which, "Just a Little", was released as the band's third single on 13 May 2002. Just a day later, the track listing for the British version of the album was revealed, which contained the three new songs, but removed "Greed" and "Never Meant to Say Goodbye" from the original edition, as they had already been issued as B-sides in the country, and also removed "Practice What You Preach" altogether, meaning it remains unreleased in the country. The album's title was also changed, this time being released under the alias of Thinking It Over. The album was finally released in the UK on 27 May 2002.

The second of the new songs, "Got to Have Your Love", was released as the band's fourth single on 9 September 2002, to moderate success. It also became the band's first cover version to be released as a single. "Holding On for You" was released as the album's fifth and final single on 2 December 2002, followed a week later by a re-release of the album, containing a bonus disc of seven remixes and three music videos, all contained in a gold slipcase. In December 2002, the album was also released in China, reinstating "Never Meant to Say Goodbye", as well as adding two bonus remixes, and the B-side track "Breathe" to the end of the album, making a total of eighteen tracks. The band revealed in an interview in April 2003 that "Wanting Me Tonight" was originally due to be released as the album's third single, but "Just a Little" was released instead, at the request of the record company. A single remix of "Wanting Me Tonight" instead appears as a B-side on the "Just a Little" physical single release.

== Critical reception ==
Professional ratings
Review scores
| Source | Rating |
|---|---|
| AllMusic | 4/5 stars |
| The Guardian | 3/5 stars |
| Yahoo! Music UK | 6/10 |

Allmusic editor Jon O'Brien called Thinking It Over "a master class in how to bury the reality pop tag," citing it "a strong collection of pop songs incorporating garage, R&B, and soul. Indeed, listening to the album, you begin to wonder how none of the members managed to be selected in the Popstars show, as vocally they are head and shoulders above their rivals, particularly Kevin Simm and Kelli Young, whose honey-smooth tones work together brilliantly [...] Several tracks toward the end are distinctly filler-ish [...] but this is a refreshing attempt at R&B-infused pop that never once tries to imitate its U.S. counterparts but does leave its U.K. contemporaries trailing in its wake." Peter Robinson from NME declared the album "something of a triumph." He found that "the people who do that sort of thing have assembled 14 strong, solid tracks across R&B, ’80s electro funk, 2-step and straightforward pop, and married them to spot-on production values. Result? The most 2002 pop album of 2002."

The Manchester Evening News called Thinking It Over "an album with slick melodies, good grooves and a touch of garage – a world away from the saccharine and platitudes of Hear'Say's music." In his review for PopMatters, Duncan White found that the album "has been well planned [and] catchy songs have been written." He remarked that the album is "expertly targeted. Bland and spineless, Liberty X disguise themselves in the sham clothes of their more credible "peers". I'm not going to dip into the predictable rant on manufactured pop, but I do find it sinister that, like a "smart" bomb, a band can be so precisely targeted." The Guardian journalist Caroline Sullivan wrote that "the future appears brighter for losing Popstars finalists Liberty X than for the winning Hear'Say [...] The single "Just a Little" is a poised wispette rooted in the same slinky pop/R&B soil that produced All Saints and Sugababes. Other bits of "Thinking It Over" pull off the same feat, making potentially cheesy songs sound almost cool through the use of sparse beats and composed vocals dominated by the band's three girls. The inevitable cover version isn't, for once, a 1970s standard but Mantronix's 1990 hit "Got to Have Your Love." So: not bad."

== Commercial performance ==
The album attained considerable commercial success in several territories following its release in 2002. It reached number three on the UK Albums Chart and number nine on the Scottish Albums Chart, while also peaking at number 11 on a composite European Top 100 Albums chart. Elsewhere, the album charted at number 23 in Ireland, number 25 in New Zealand, number 52 in the Netherlands, number 71 in Switzerland, and number 101 in France. In March 2003, the album was certified double Platinum by the British Phonographic Industry (BPI). By December 2021, Thinking It Over had sold 693,000 copies in the United Kingdom.

== Track listing ==
Standard edition
| No. | Title | Writer(s) | Producer(s) | Length |
|---|---|---|---|---|
| 1. | "Thinking It Over" | Tony Lundon; Kelli Young; Stephen Hart; Mary Applegate; Jim Sullivan; Eddie Craig; Pete Devereux | Devereux; The Wideboys | 4:09 |
| 2. | "Just a Little" | Michelle Escoffery; George Hammond Hagan; John Hammond Hagan | The BigPockets | 3:58 |
| 3. | "Doin' It" | Stephen Duberry; Steve Hart; John McLaughlin | Duberry; McLaughlin | 3:51 |
| 4. | "Wanting Me Tonight" | Escoffery; Karl Gordon; Jessica Taylor; Michelle Heaton; Lundon; Kevin Simm; Young | K-Gee | 4:28 |
| 5. | "Got to Have Your Love" | Bryce Wilson; Kirk Khaleel; Johnny Rodriguez | Rod Gammons | 3:55 |
| 6. | "No Clouds" | Young; Taylor; Simm; Lundon; Mushtaq Uddin | Mushtaq | 3:56 |
| 7. | "Everyday" | Simm; Lundon; Jon O'Mahony; Nick Keynes; Michael Harwood | Goldust | 4:49 |
| 8. | "Saturday" | Escoffery; Uddin | Tim Laws | 3:47 |
| 9. | "Holding On for You" | Martin Prime; Simm; Lundon; Taylor; Young; Laws; Frazer Hurrell | Laws | 3:30 |
| 10. | "I Got What You Want" | Taylor; Young; Alan Glass; David Brant; Maryanne Morgan | Brant | 3:44 |
| 11. | "Feel the Rush" | Henrik Andersson; Martin Ankelius; McLaughlin | McLaughlin; Duberry | 3:36 |
| 12. | "Right Here Right Now" | Lundon; Simm; Hart; Harwood; Keynes; O'Mahony; Andrea Remanda | Goldust | 4:21 |
| 13. | "Dream About It" | Simm; Young; Taylor; Heaton; Lundon; Laws; Hurrell | Laws; Hurrell | 3:47 |
| 14. | "Never Give Up" | Simm; Lundon; Taylor; Young | Goldust | 1:30 |

Chinese edition bonus tracks
| No. | Title | Writer(s) | Producer(s) | Length |
|---|---|---|---|---|
| 15. | "Never Meant to Say Goodbye" | Lundon; Simm; Young; Taylor | Goldust | 4:45 |
| 16. | "Thinking It Over" (Pete Devereux & The Wideboys Club Vocal Remix) | Lundon; Young; Hart; Hart; Applegate; Sullivan; Craig; Devereux | Devereux; The Wideboys |
| 17. | "Just a Little" (Almighty Mix) | Escoffery; G. Hammond Hagan; J. Hammond Hagan | The BigPockets; Almighty^{[A]} |
| 18. | "Breathe" | Lundon | K-Gee | 3:51 |

Special edition bonus disc
| No. | Title | Writer(s) | Producer(s) | Length |
|---|---|---|---|---|
| 1. | "Thinking It Over" (Pete Devereux & The Wideboys Club Vocal Remix) | Lundon; Young; Hart; Hart; Applegate; Sullivan; Craig; Devereux | Devereux; The Wideboys |
| 2. | "Doin' It" (The Wideboys Club Mix) | Duberry; Hart; McLaughlin | Duberry; McLaughlin; The Wideboys^{[A]} |
| 3. | "Doin' It" (Blacksmith R&B Rub) | Duberry; Hart; McLaughlin | Duberry; McLaughlin; Blacksmith^{[A]} |
| 4. | "Wanting Me Tonight" (Wookie Full Vocal Mix) | Escoffery; Gordon; Taylor; Heaton; Lundon; Simm; Young | K-Gee; Wookie^{[A]} |
| 5. | "Just a Little" (Bump & Flex Electro Shock Club Mix) | Escoffery; G. Hammond Hagan; J. Hammond Hagan | The BigPockets; Bump & Flex^{[A]} |
| 6. | "Got to Have Your Love" (Jam & Faces Vamp Mix) | Wilson; Khaleel; Rodriguez | Gammons; Jam & Faces^{[A]} |
| 7. | "Got to Have Your Love" (Kurtis Matronik's 3 Way Action Mix) | Wilson; Khaleel; Rodriguez | Gammons; Kurtis Matronik^{[A]} |
| 8. | "Got to Have Your Love" (Video) |
| 9. | "Just a Little" (Video) |
| 10. | "Thinking It Over" (Video) |

Japanese edition (released as To Those Who Wait)
| No. | Title | Writer(s) | Producer(s) | Length |
|---|---|---|---|---|
| 1. | "Thinking It Over" | Lundon; Young; Hart; Applegate; Sullivan; Craig; Devereux | Devereux; The Wideboys | 4:09 |
| 2. | "Doin' It" | Duberry; Hart; McLaughlin | Duberry; McLaughlin | 3:51 |
| 3. | "Wanting Me Tonight" | Escoffery; Gordon; Taylor; Heaton; Lundon; Simm; Young | K-Gee | 4:28 |
| 4. | "No Clouds" | Young; Taylor; Simm; Lundon; Uddin | Mushtaq | 3:56 |
| 5. | "Everyday" | Simm; Lundon; O'Mahony; Keynes; Harwood | Goldust | 4:49 |
| 6. | "Saturday" | Escoffery; Uddin | Laws | 3:47 |
| 7. | "Holding On for You" | Prime; Simm; Lundon; Taylor; Young; Laws; Hurrell | Laws | 3:30 |
| 8. | "I Got What You Want" | Taylor; Young; Glass; Brant; Morgan | Brant | 3:44 |
| 9. | "Practise What You Preach" | Taylor; Simm; Young | Laws | 2:59 |
| 10. | "Greed" | Simm; Lundon; Hart; Harwood; Laws; Hurrell | Laws | 3:41 |
| 11. | "Right Here Right Now" | Simm; Lundon; Hart; Harwood; Keynes; O'Mahony; Remanda | Goldust | 4:21 |
| 12. | "Dream About It" | Simm; Young; Taylor; Heaton; Lundon; Laws; Hurrell | Laws; Hurrel | 3:47 |
| 13. | "Never Give Up" | Simm; Lundon; Taylor; Young | Goldust | 1:30 |
| 14. | "Never Meant to Say Goodbye" | Lundon; Simm; Young; Taylor | Goldust | 4:45 |

Notes

- ^{^[A]} denotes additional producer

== Charts ==
=== Weekly charts ===
Weekly chart performance for Thinking It Over
| Chart (2002) | Peak position |
|---|---|
| Dutch Albums (Album Top 100) | 52 |
| European Albums (Billboard) | 11 |
| French Albums (SNEP) | 101 |
| Irish Albums (IRMA) | 23 |
| New Zealand Albums (RMNZ) | 25 |
| Scottish Albums (OCC) | 9 |
| Swiss Albums (Schweizer Hitparade) | 71 |
| UK Albums (OCC) | 3 |

=== Year-end charts ===
2002 year-end chart performance for Thinking It Over
| Chart (2002) | Position |
|---|---|
| UK Albums (OCC) | 32 |

2003 year-end chart performance for Thinking It Over
| Chart (2003) | Position |
|---|---|
| UK Albums (OCC) | 76 |

== Certifications ==
Certifications for Thinking It Over
| Region | Certification | Certified units/sales |
|---|---|---|
| United Kingdom (BPI) | 2× Platinum | 693,000 |

== Release history ==
Thinking It Over release history
| Region | Date | Format(s) | Label | Edition(s) | Ref |
|---|---|---|---|---|---|
| Japan | 28 November 2001 | CD (To Those Who Wait) | V2 Records | Standard | |
| Ireland | 24 May 2002 | CD | V2 Records | Standard | |
| United Kingdom | 27 May 2002 | CD, cassette | V2 Records | Standard | |
| China | 11 December 2002 | CD | V2 Records | Standard | |
| United Kingdom | 9 December 2002 | CD | V2 Records | Deluxe | |
