= All You Good Friends =

Single by Kevin Simm
- Released: 9 April 2016
- Genre: Pop
- Length: 3:07
- Label: Universal
- Songwriter(s): Phil Bentley; Steve Hart; Jamie Hartman
- Producer(s): Peter-John Vettese

Kevin Simm singles chronology
"Brand New" (2008)	"All You Good Friends" (2016)	"Wildfire" (2016)

"All You Good Friends" is a song by former Liberty X member and The Voice UK series 5 winner Kevin Simm. It was released as his debut solo single on 9 April 2016 and peaked at number 24 on the UK Singles Chart. It was his first single to make the top 40 since "A Night to Remember" reached number six in 2005 with his former band Liberty X.

== Background ==
Simm earned the right to release the single, an original song, after winning the fifth series of The Voice UK. He told the Official Charts Company after his victory that he was lucky that the song he released was one that he really likes and that he could relate to the lyrics. He had risen to fame originally as part of the pop group Liberty X (previously known as Liberty), which was made up of the runners up from the first series of the talent show Popstars. With the group, he released thirteen singles, eight of which reached the top 10, including their biggest hit in 2002, the number-one single "Just a Little".

After their split in 2007, Simm released several solo singles but none of those impacted the charts. He entered The Voice in 2016, performing Sia's "Chandelier" in his blind audition. In the final, he beat Jolan to the crown and gave Kaiser Chiefs' frontman his second consecutive win as coach.

== Production ==
After his victory on The Voice, Simm was awarded with a record contract with Universal Music TV and, for the first time in the history of the show, the track was released within minutes of the final to download and stream. The song was co-written by Steve Hart, Phil Bentley and Jamie Hartman, and produced by Peter-John Vettesse, who had previously worked with Sia and James Bay. The BBC announced that 20p from each digital download and 50% of Universal's streaming receipts would be donated to Comic Relief.

== Chart performance ==
"All You Good Friends" went straight into the UK Singles Chart at its peak position of number 24, spending a single week in the chart on the week ending 21 April 2016. The song also reached number two on its debut on The Big Top 40, broadcast across commercial radio stations in the UK, only finishing behind Drake's chart-topping "One Dance".

== Charts ==
Chart (2016)	Peak position
UK Singles (OCC)	24
