= Brand New (Kevin Simm album) =

Studio album by Kevin Simm
- Released: 3 October 2008
- Recorded: 2007–2008
- Genre: Pop
- Length: 42:10
- Label: Jamdown

Kevin Simm chronology
Brand New (2008)	Recover (2016)

Singles from Brand New
- 1. "Brand New" Released: 3 October 2008

Brand New is the debut solo album released by former Liberty X member Kevin Simm. The album was released on 3 October 2008 only in Japan.

== Singles ==
"Brand New" was released as the lead single from the album on 3 October 2008.

== Track listing ==
No.	Title	Length
1.	"Brand New"	3:24
2.	"It's About Us"	4:25
3.	"Better Man"	3:32
4.	"There Must Be an Angel"	4.32
5.	"Something I'm Not"	4.04
6.	"Hot Summer's Day"	3:59
7.	"Like Marvin Said"	3:32
8.	"Miss U Baby"	4:09
9.	"Angelina"	4.16
10.	"Talk to Me"	3:34
11.	"Jackpot"	3:58
12.	"Blood on My Hands"	3:58
Total length:		42:10

== Chart performance ==
=== Weekly charts ===
Chart (2008)	Peak position
Japan Albums (Oricon)	-

== Release history ==
Region	Release date	Format	Label
Japan	3 October 2008	Digital download; CD	Jamdown Ltd
United States	9 March 2011	Digital download; CD	Jamdown Ltd
