= Soapstars =

- Genre: Reality television
- Presented by: Carol Vorderman
- Judges: Yvon Grace; Paul de Freitas; Bill Lyons
- Narrated by: Daniel Hill
- Country of origin: United Kingdom
- Original language: English
- No. of series: 1
- No. of episodes: 10

Production
- Running time: 30–60 minutes (inc. adverts)
- Production company: LWT

Original release
- Network: ITV
- Release: 3 September – 7 November 2001

Related
- I Wanna Be a Soap Star

Soapstars is a British reality television show that aired on ITV from 3 September 2001 to 7 November 2001. The series featured thousands of contestants auditioning to be cast as part of a new family—consisting of a mother, father and three teenage children—in the ITV soap opera Emmerdale. The judging panel consisted of drama producer Yvon Grace, casting director Paul de Freitas, and Emmerdale scriptwriter Bill Lyons.

Auditions for Soapstars began on 8 June 2001 in Sheffield. British actor's trade union Equity released a statement critical of the series, stating it was "an insulting affront to the men and women in our profession who endure low rates of pay, rejection and humiliation in the course of their work, despite their training, experience, dedication and talent."

The winners of Soapstars were Dee Whitehead (for the role of Maggie Calder), Mark Jardine (for the role of Phil Weston), Elspeth Brodie (for the role of Lucy Calder), Jason Hain (for the role of Craig Calder) and Ruth Abram (for the role of Jess Weston). They initially won three month contracts to appear as the Calder family in Emmerdale, beginning in November 2001. Their contracts were later extended, but by August 2002, all the winners had left the show.

The show was inspired by the earlier reality show Popstars.
