= Paul Adam (music) =

British songwriter and music manager

- Born: 1964 (age 61–62)
- Occupations: music executive, songwriter, record producer
- Years active: 1990 – present
- Employer: Global Group

Paul Adam is a British songwriter, music manager and former television personality.

Adam has worked as a songwriter for singers such as Dannii Minogue, Amy Macdonald and The Noisettes. He was director of A&R at Polydor Records. In 2001 he was one of the judges on ITV's Popstars, with fellow judges Nigel Lythgoe and Nicki Chapman. The series itself saw the birth of successful group Hear'Say. When the second series was commissioned in September 2002, Adam decided not to return as he was too busy working as a music executive at RCA Records, he was replaced by Irish music manager Louis Walsh.

As of 1 June 2012, Adam is currently the director of Global Group's Talent and Publishing divisions.
