= FHM =

Men's lifestyle magazine (1985–2016)

- Cover of the October 2014 issue, featuring Natalie Dormer
- Editor: Unknown
- Categories: Men's lifestyle
- First issue: 1985; 41 years ago
- Final issue: February 2016 (print)
- Company: Bauer Media Group
- Language: English

FHM (For Him Magazine) was a printed British multinational men's fashion lifestyle magazine that was published in several countries. It contained features such as the FHM 100 Sexiest Women in the World.

The final printed issue of British FHM was dated February 2016, after which the magazine moved to a digital-only platform, with updated daily content on topics such as dating tips, style advice, viral news, sports and entertainment.

== History ==
The magazine began publication in 1985 in the UK under the name For Him Magazine and changed its title to FHM in May 1992, although the full For Him Magazine continued to be printed on the spine of each issue. The first woman to appear on the cover was Gina Bellman in February 1993. The trend towards female cover stars grew over the following year, with both Naomi Campbell and Andie MacDowell appearing.

Circulation expanded to newsagents as a quarterly by the spring of 1987 and then monthly in 1994. EMAP Consumer Media bought the magazine in 1994 and it subsequently went on to dominate the UK men's market and began to expand internationally, being published in 32 countries including India.

FHM's High Street Honey competition (2002—) awards £10,000, an FHM TV presenting job and the chance to appear on the FHM front cover.

On 17 November 2015, British FHM announced their intention to suspend publication alongside that of fellow men's magazine Zoo, leaving the publication available via its website at FHM.com.

The final print edition appeared in February 2016, with Holly Willoughby as its cover model.

In August 2016, under the guidance of BauerXcel Media, a property of Bauer Media Group, Nick Dimengo took over as the senior editor of FHM.com.

== FHM 100 Sexiest Women in the World ==
Each of FHM's international editions publish yearly rankings for the sexiest women alive based on public and editorial voting through the magazine's website. Dates of magazine issues, winners, ages of winners at the time of selection, and pertinent comments are listed below. The data below refer only to the British edition (the rankings for the international editions vary widely, with many top-ranking women in some editions not appearing at all in others).

Year	Choice	Age	Notes
1995	Claudia Schiffer	25	First supermodel to have won the accolade
1996	Gillian Anderson	28	First winner voted for by the public
1997	Teri Hatcher	33	First woman over 30 to win the accolade
1998	Jenny McCarthy	26	Former Playboy Playmate
1999	Sarah Michelle Gellar	22	American actress
2000	Jennifer Lopez	31	First woman to win the accolade twice
2001	Jennifer Lopez	32	First woman to win the accolade twice
2002	Anna Kournikova	22	Only athlete to win the accolade
2003	Halle Berry	37	American actress. Oldest winner
2003	Kristanna Loken	23	American actress
2004	Britney Spears	22	American singer
2005	Kelly Brook	25	First British winner
2006	Keira Knightley	21	British actress. Youngest winner
2007	Jessica Alba	26	American actress
2008	Megan Fox	22	American actress
2009	Cheryl Cole	25	British singer
2010	Cheryl Cole	26	British singer
2011	Rosie Huntington-Whiteley	24	British model
2012	Tulisa	23	British singer
2013	Mila Kunis	29	American actress
2014	Jennifer Lawrence	23	American actress
2015	Michelle Keegan	27	British actress
2016	Margot Robbie	26	Australian actress
2017	Gal Gadot	32	Israeli actress

== FHM international ==
FHM was published in the following territories.

Country	Publisher
FHM Australia	Bauer Media Group, published 1998–2012, relaunched 2025 by Nuclear
FHM Bulgaria	
FHM Canada	Published between 1995 and 2007
FHM China	Trends Press
FHM Denmark	Benjamin Publications A/S
FHM Estonia
FHM France	Emap then Mondadori then 1633 Publishing, closed in 2014
FHM Germany	Published between October 2000 and November 2012
FHM Greece	Lambrakis Publications, closed in December 2007
FHM Holland	Free Media Group, closed in June 2013
FHM Hungary	Jessica Szekeres
FHM India	TCG Media Group
FHM Indonesia	MRA Media Group, closed in December 2017
FHM Japan	
FHM Latvia	Lilita
FHM Lithuania	
FHM Malaysia	Astro Digital Publications Sdn Bhd, closed in January 2016
FHM Mexico	
FHM New Zealand	Nuclear Media, since 2025
FHM Norway	Bonnier Group, closed in August 2014
FHM Tajikistan Turkmenistan Kyrgyzstan Kazakhstan Uzbekistan	
FHM Philippines	Summit Media, closed on 1 May 2018 (physical release), relaunch since October 2026 (online only) by Playtime Entertainment
FHM Portugal	Impresa Publishing (formerly Abril/controljornal, closed on 25 February 2010)
FHM Romania	Published between April 2000 and August 2014
FHM Russia	Closed in 2016
FHM Singapore	Mediacorp, closed in September 2015
FHM Slovenia	VideoTop, closed in March 2013
FHM South Africa	Media24
FHM Spain	Published between January 2004 and March 2017
FHM Sweden	Currently published
FHM Taiwan	Taiwan Publishing Co, currently published
FHM Thailand	Inspire Entertainment
FHM Turkey	Saffron Media
FHM UK	Bauer Media Group (only online)
FHM US	Defunct

== See also ==
- The Girls of FHM
- List of men's magazines
