= Holding On for You =

2002 single by Liberty X

Single by Liberty X

from the album Thinking It Over
- B-side: "Shut Up and Dance"; "Before It's Goodbye"; "So Alive"
- Released: 2 December 2002
- Length: 3:25
- Label: V2
- Composer: Martin Prime
- Lyricists: Frazer Hurrell; Tim Laws; Tony Lundon; Martin Prime; Kevin Simm; Jessica Taylor; Kelli Young
- Producer: Tim Laws

Liberty X singles chronology
"Got to Have Your Love" (2002)	"Holding On for You" (2002)	"Being Nobody" (2003)

"Holding On for You" is a song by English-Irish pop group Liberty X. It was written by Martin Prime and produced by Tim Laws, with additional lyrics contributed by Laws and Frazer Hurrell alongside group members Kevin Simm, Tony Lundon, Jessica Taylor and Kelli Young. It was released in the United Kingdom on 2 December 2002 as the fifth and final single from the group's debut studio album, Thinking It Over (2002). The single peaked at number five on the UK Singles Chart, becoming the joint third highest-charting single from the LP. It was the band's first ballad to be released as a single, and despite low airplay, the song was a minor hit across Europe, being successful in Ireland, the Netherlands, and Switzerland.

== Background ==
"Holding On for You" was written by Frazer Hurrell, Martin Prime, and Liberty X band members Tony Lundon, Kevin Simm, Jessica Taylor, and Kelli Young along with producer Tim Laws for their debut studio album, Thinking It Over (2002). Although the song had not originally been intended for the album, a demo by Prime was brought to the group's attention by Liberty X's manager, who was particularly impressed by the track. While the group felt that the lyrics, having been translated from another language, sounded "weird" and that the original production leaned too heavily toward bubbglegum pop, they agreed to rework the track in the studio. There, the group revised the lyrics and reworked the melodies, ultimately reshaping the track into something more in keeping with the sound and style of their debut album.

== Versions and remixes ==
For the single release of "Holding On for You", additional production was provided by Jonathan Quarmby and Kevin Bacon. Their remix, marketed in the United Kingdom as the "Single Remix", was also released internationally under the title "B&Q Mix". This version also appears a bonus track on Liberty X's third studio album, X (2005). The original version of the track appears on To Those Who Wait in 2001, the band's debut release, exclusively in Japan. The version of the track which features on the British version of the album is slightly different to all of the other versions, and for international releases, this was dubbed the alternative version. One of the single's B-sides, "So Alive", was never issued on CD in the United Kingdom.

== Commercial performance ==
Released as the fifth single from Thinking It Over, "Holding On for You" achieved moderate commercial success, reaching number five on the UK Singles Chart. While it became the group's fourth consecutive UK top-five hit from the album, it did not match the commercial heights of its predecessor "Just a Little," which topped the UK chart and became Liberty X's biggest international success, although it peaked atop the UK Independent Singles Chart. Internationally, "Holding On for You" charted in several European territories, peaking at number 20 in Ireland, number 31 in the Netherlands, number 47 in Switzerland, number 65 in Belgium's Flemish region, and number 78 in Germany.

== Music video ==
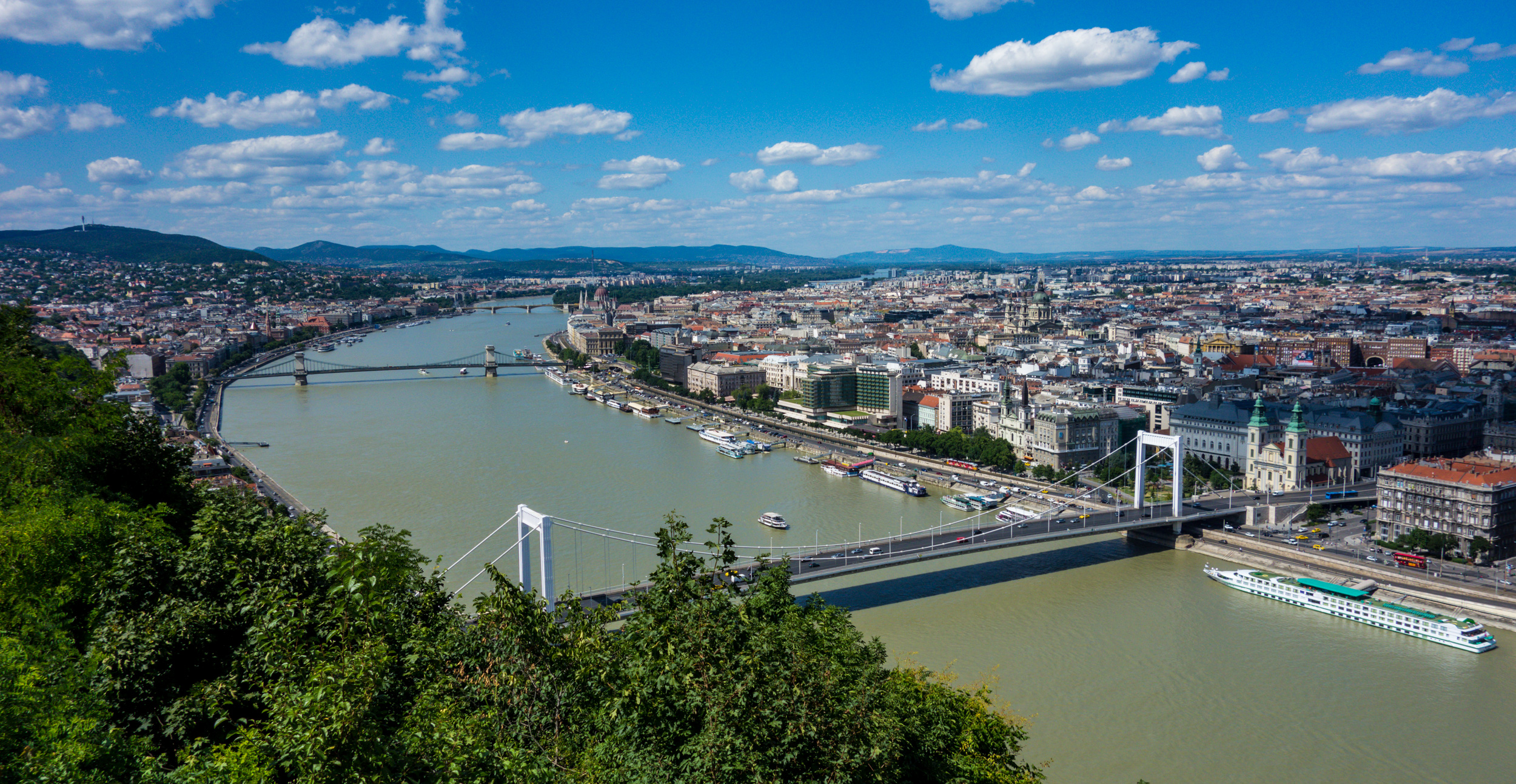
The music video for "Holding On for You" was filmed in Budapest.

A music video for "Holding On for You" was filmed in Budapest in September 2002 and directed by Katie Bell. It follows the five members of Liberty X as they travel to the city's metro system from different locations. In the closing scenes, each member departs on a separate train, a visual metaphor intended to highlight their individual identities within the group. Young later described the shoot as "tricky" due to the lack of filming permits, which meant that much of the video was filmed among unsuspecting members of the public. The video was later featured on the band's live DVD, Just a Little: Live at Cardiff Arena, as well as the bonus DVD that accompanied the Australian edition of the band's third studio album, X.

== Track listings ==
UK CD single 1
No.	Title	Writer(s)	Producer(s)	Length
1.	"Holding On for You" (single remix)	Kevin Simm; Tony Lundon; Jessica Taylor; Kelli Young; Martin Prime; Tim Laws; Frazer Hurrell	Laws; Bacon & Quarmby^{[a]}	3:25
2.	"Shut Up and Dance"	Simm; Lundon; Grant Black; James McMillan	McMillan	3:15
3.	"Before It's Goodbye"	Lundon; McMillan	McMillan	3:14

UK CD single 2
No.	Title	Writer(s)	Producer(s)	Length
1.	"Holding On for You" (Double R remix)	Simm; Lundon; Taylor; Young; Prime; Laws; Hurrell	Laws; Double R^{[a]}	5:08
2.	"Holding On for You" (Brooks' Hold Tight mix)	Simm; Lundon; Taylor; Young; Prime; Laws; Hurrell	Laws; Brooks^{[a]}	6:05
3.	"Holding On for You" (Mickey P & Raph alternative mix)	Simm; Lundon; Taylor; Young; Prime; Laws; Hurrell	Laws; Mickey P^{[a]}; Raph^{[a]}	3:42
4.	"Holding On for You" (Double R instrumental)	Simm; Lundon; Taylor; Young; Prime; Laws; Hurrell	Laws; Double R^{[a]}	5:08

German maxi single
No.	Title	Writer(s)	Producer(s)	Length
1.	"Holding On for You" (B&Q Mix)	Simm; Lundon; Taylor; Young; Prime; Laws; Hurrell	Laws; Bacon & Quarmby^{[a]}	3:25
2.	"Shut Up and Dance"	Simm; Lundon; Grant Black; James McMillan	McMillan	3:15
3.	"Before It's Goodbye"	Lundon; McMillan	McMillan	3:14
4.	"So Alive"	Young; Michelle Heaton; Ben Copland; Martin Bushell	Rick Hanley; Darren Woodford	3:38

Notes

- ^{^[a]} signifies additional co-producer(s)

== Charts ==
=== Weekly charts ===
Weekly chart performance for "Holding On for You"
Chart (2002–2003)	Peak position
Belgium (Ultratip Bubbling Under Flanders)	15
Europe (Eurochart Hot 100)	25
Germany (GfK)	78
Ireland (IRMA)	20
Netherlands (Dutch Top 40)	31
Netherlands (Single Top 100)	36
Scotland Singles (Official Charts)	9
Switzerland (Schweizer Hitparade)	47
UK Singles (Official Charts)	5
UK Indie (Official Charts)	1

=== Year-end charts ===
Year-end chart performance for "Holding On for You"
Chart (2002)	Position
UK Singles (OCC)	130

== Release history ==
Release dates and formats for "Holding On for You"
Region	Date	Format(s)	Label(s)	Ref(s).
United Kingdom	2 December 2002	CD; cassette	V2	
