= Kevin Simm =

English musical artist (born 1980)

- Born: Kevin Ian Simm; 5 September 1980 (age 46); Chorley, Lancashire, England
- Genres: Pop; soul
- Occupations: Singer; songwriter
- Instruments: Vocals; guitar
- Years active: 2001–present
- Labels: Universal; Jamdown
- Member of: Liberty X; Wet Wet Wet
- Spouse: Laura Simm (m. 2008)

Kevin Ian Simm (born 5 September 1980) is an English singer and songwriter. He is best known as a member of pop group Liberty X, and is currently the lead singer of rock band Wet Wet Wet. Simm also won The Voice UK in 2016.

== Career ==
=== 2001–2007: Liberty X ===
In 2001, Simm auditioned for the ITV reality television music competition Popstars, a show intended to form a new group from individual contestants, becoming one of the finalists. While the five winning contestants formed Hear'Say, the five runner-up contestants – Simm, Tony Lundon, Jessica Taylor, Kelli Young and Michelle Heaton – formed the group Liberty X and signed a multimillion-pound record contract with Richard Branson and V2 Records. Liberty X released three studio albums and enjoyed seven Top 10 singles from 2001 to 2005: Their biggest hit, "Just a Little", reached number one in May 2002; "Thinking It Over", "Got to Have Your Love", "Song 4 Lovers", and "Holding on for You" all reached the top 5 in the UK Singles Chart. They split up in 2007 after selling over 3 million records worldwide.

During this time, Simm appeared on The Games, in 2005, winning a silver medal.

=== 2008–2015: Brand New and Liberty X return ===
In 2007 Simm signed with the independent label Jamdown Records and started recording his first solo work. On 3 October 2008 he released his debut studio album, Brand New, first only in Japan and two years later in Europe. The title song was released as the lead single and had a music video directed by Fatty Soprano. From 2009 to 2012 Simm performed live at festivals and pubs.

In 2013 Simm reunited with Liberty X for ITV2's reality show The Big Reunion, along with other pop groups of their time – B*Witched, Honeyz, 911, Five and Atomic Kitten – to solve past problems and do a live performance at the London Hammersmith Apollo on 26 February. Due to the success, Liberty X returned for a full tour between 2013 and 2014.

=== 2016–2017: The Voice UK and Recover ===
In 2016, Simm auditioned for the fifth series of The Voice UK singing a soulful version of Sia's "Chandelier". All four coaches – will.i.am, Ricky Wilson, Boy George and Paloma Faith – turned their chairs for him and he chose to join Faith's team. Simm lost against Faith Nelson in the battle rounds and was nearly eliminated from the competition, but was stolen by Wilson, joining his team for the knockout rounds. He won the season of The Voice UK on 9 April.

Performances
Performed	Song	Original artist	Result
Blind Audition	"Chandelier"	Sia	All judges turned and joined team Paloma
Battle Rounds	"Spotlight" (against Faith Nelson)	Jennifer Hudson	Lost, joined team Ricky
Knockout rounds	"Wings"	Birdy	Fast pass
Quarter-final	"I'm Kissing You"	Des'ree	Fast pass
Semi-final	"The Power of Love" (as part of Team Ricky)	Huey Lewis and the News	Safe
Semi-final	"Rolling in the Deep"	Adele	Safe
Live final	"Stay"	Rihanna	Winner
Live final	"Mr. Brightside" (with Ricky Wilson)	The Killers	Winner
Live final	"All You Good Friends"	Original song	Winner

In the same month, Simm signed with Universal and released his new single as The Voice winner, "All You Good Friends"; the song peaked at number 24 in the UK and 3 in Scotland. On 28 October 2016 it was released his second studio album, Recover, the first by Universal, and chosen "Wildfire" as single.

=== 2018–present: Wet Wet Wet and second Liberty X return ===
On 25 September 2018, it was announced that Simm would join Scottish band Wet Wet Wet as the new lead singer, replacing original member Marti Pellow. He debuted with the band in November of that year. On 5 November 2021 they released their first album with Simm as vocalist, The Journey, peaking at number 29 in UK.

On 7 October 2026, Liberty X posted a short video on their social media accounts, teasing a full reunion of the original line-up, with Simm returning to the group.

== Personal life ==
Simm married Laura Simm in June 2008 after 7 years of dating. They have two children: Charlie, born in October 2011, and Oliver, born in November 2013.

== Discography ==
=== Studio albums ===
Title	Details	Peak chart positions
Title	Details	UK
Brand New	Released: 3 October 2008; Label: Jamdown; Format: CD, digital download	—
Recover	Released: 28 October 2016; Label: Universal; Format: CD, digital download	114

=== EPs ===
Title	Details
Love & Pain	Released: 3 November 2017; Label: Tristar Records; Format: Digital download
Unplugged Acoustic	Released: 12 October 2018; Label: Tristar Records; Format: Digital download
Snow & Flakes	Released: 15 November 2019; Label: Tristar Records; Format: Digital download

=== Singles ===
As main artist

List of singles, with selected chart positions
Title	Year	Peak chart positions		Album
Title	Year	UK	SCO	Album
"Brand New"	2008	—	—	Brand New
"All You Good Friends"	2016	24	3	non-album single
"Wildfire"	2016	—	—	Recover
"Strangers"	2016	—	—	Recover
"—" denotes releases that did not chart or were not released in that territory.

As featured artist

Title	Year	Album
"Tennessee Whiskey" (Amber Leigh Irish featuring Kevin Simm)	2020	non-album single
"Stay Another Day" (Matt Johnson featuring Kevin Simm and John Adams)	2020	non-album single
"Freedom" (Paul Canning featuring Kevin Simm)	2022	non-album single

=== Songwriting credits ===
Title	Year	Artist
"U"	2006	Super Junior

== Filmography ==
=== Television ===
Year	Title	Role	Notes
1999	Stars in Their Eyes	Contestant	Series 10
2001	Popstars	Contestant	Series 1
2005	The Games	Contestant	Series 3
2013	The Big Reunion	Himself	
2016	The Voice UK	Contestant	Series 5
