= Doin' It (Liberty X song) =

2001 single by Liberty

Single by Liberty

from the album Thinking It Over
- B-side: "Right Here Right Now"; "Never Meant to Say Goodbye"; "Meant to Be"
- Released: 3 December 2001
- Recorded: 2001
- Length: 3:48
- Label: V2
- Songwriters: Stephen Duberry; Steve Hart; John McLaughlin
- Producers: Stephen Duberry; John McLaughlin

Liberty singles chronology
"Thinking It Over" (2001)	"Doin' It" (2001)	"Just a Little" (2002)

Doin' It is a song by English-Irish pop group Liberty X, then known as Liberty. Released on 3 December 2001, the song reached number 14 on the UK Singles Chart.

== Track listings ==
UK CD1

1. "Doin' It"
2. "Right Here Right Now"
3. "Never Meant to Say Goodbye"

UK CD2

1. "Doin' It"
2. "Doin' It" (Kool De Sac Klub Mix edit)
3. "Doin' It" (The Wideboys Radio Mix)
4. "Doin' It" (Sleazesisters Anthem Mix edit)
5. "Doin' It" (video)

UK cassette single

1. "Doin' It"
2. "Meant to Be"

== Charts ==
Chart (2001)	Peak position
Europe (Eurochart Hot 100)	59
Scotland Singles (Official Charts)	22
UK Singles (Official Charts)	14
UK Indie (Official Charts)	5
