= Everybody Cries =

Single by Liberty X

from the album Being Somebody
- B-side: "Sunshine"; "Enemy"
- Released: 12 January 2004
- Length: 3:59
- Label: V2 Records
- Songwriters: Hannah Robinson, Pascal Gabriel
- Producer: Marius de Vries

Liberty X singles chronology
"Jumpin" (2003)	"Everybody Cries" (2004)	"Fresh" (2004)

"Everybody Cries" is the third and final single to be released from English-Irish pop-group Liberty X's second studio album, Being Somebody. The single was released on 12 January 2004, peaking at number 13 on the UK Singles Chart and number 24 on the Irish Singles Chart. The single only spent a further two weeks on the British chart before falling out of the top 40 completely. It was the band's last single with V2 Records, after being dropped by label boss Richard Branson.

== Background ==
In its second week on the chart, the single fell to No. 26, before falling even further the following week, to No. 39. Whilst discussing the single during the ITV2 documentary The Big Reunion, band member Kelli Young revealed that the band were worried that releasing "Everybody Cries" as a single would be a risk, and she was not sure whether the fans "would get it", as the song was a power ballad. She stated that the risk was uncalculated as the band "had never really released along that line at the time".

== Music video ==
The music video for the song was filmed in October 2003, and features the band walking along disused railway lines in the English countryside, whilst behind the band, rubbish was showered, with items such as disused furniture and bicycles falling onto the railway tracks. The video was revolutionary to film at the time, as it took six days and a budget of nearly £150,000. However, the music video proved controversial, and received criticism from the Rail Safety and Standards Board, because of fears of copy-cat acts in the future. This fear proved unfounded.

== Track listing ==
UK CD single 1

1. "Everybody Cries" (Radio Edit) – 3:59
2. "Sunshine" – 3:24

UK CD single 2

1. "Everybody Cries" (Album Version) – 4:56
2. "Everybody Cries" (Bimbo Jones Mix) – 7:44
3. "Enemy" – 3:39
4. "Everybody Cries" (Behind The Scenes Footage) – 2:08

UK DVD single

1. "Everybody Cries" (Video) – 3:59
2. "Jumpin'" (Video) – 3:38
3. "Everybody Cries" (Wookie Mix) (Audio) – 5:01

== Charts ==
Chart (2004)	Peak position
Ireland (IRMA)	24
Scotland Singles (OCC)	14
UK Singles (OCC)	13
UK Indie (OCC)	5

== Release history ==
Region	Date	Format(s)	Label(s)	Ref.
United Kingdom	12 January 2004	CD single; DVD single	V2	
