= Michelle Heaton =

English musical artist (born 1979)

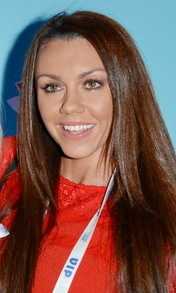
- Heaton in 2014

Background information
- Born: Michelle Christine Heaton; 19 July 1979 (age 47); Gateshead, Tyne and Wear, England
- Genres: Pop
- Occupations: Singer; actress
- Years active: 2001–present
- Member of: Liberty X
- Spouses: Andy Scott-Lee (m. 2006–2008) Hugh Hanley (m. 2010)

Michelle Christine Heaton (born 19 July 1979) is an English singer, stage actress and television personality. She is best known as member of the pop group Liberty X.

== Early life ==
Heaton was born in Gateshead, Tyne and Wear, England, on 19 July 1979. A former student of Emmanuel City Technology College in Gateshead and Newcastle College of Performing Arts, she began her singing career in the group Sirens in the late 1990s with other girls from the northeast of England.

== Career ==
=== 2001–2007: Liberty X ===
In 2001, Heaton auditioned for the ITV reality television music competition Popstars, a show intended to form a new group from individual contestants, becoming one of the finalist. While the five winning contestants formed Hear'Say, the five runner-up contestants – Heaton, Tony Lundon, Kevin Simm, Jessica Taylor and Kelli Young – formed the group Liberty X and signed a multimillion-pound record contract with Richard Branson and V2 Records. Liberty X released three studio albums and enjoyed seven Top 10 singles from 2001 to 2005: Their biggest hit, "Just a Little", reached number one in May 2002; "Thinking It Over", "Got to Have Your Love", "Song 4 Lovers", and "Holding on for You" all reached the top 5 in the UK Singles Chart. They split up in 2007 after selling over 3 million records worldwide.

During this time, Heaton also starred two reality shows: Totally Scott-Lee (2005), based around the Lisa Scott-Lee solo career, and ITV2's Michelle & Andy's Big Day (2006) about Heaton and Andy Scott-Lee wedding.

=== 2007–2012: Television appearances ===
In 2007, Heaton was one of the judges on You're a Star, an Irish talent show run on RTÉ. In 2008, she competed on the reality television shows Fáilte Towers on RTÉ One in Ireland and on a celebrity edition of Come Dine with Me, finishing in third place. In 2009 Heaton appeared in the sixth series of Celebrity Big Brother and as an elf on Ant & Dec's Saturday Night Takeaway on Saturday 21 March 2009.

In 2007/08, she appeared at the Sunderland Empire in Cinderella with her then partner Andy Scott Lee, Mickey Rooney and Les Dennis. In 2010 she was in Aladdin at the Southport Theatre where she played the role of Princess Jasmine. From 2010 to 2011 Heaton starred the comedy The Naked Truth as Gabby. In 2015 she returned to Aladdin at Harpenden.

=== 2013–present: Liberty X return ===
In 2013 Heaton reunited with Liberty X for ITV2's reality show The Big Reunion, along with other pop groups of their time – B*Witched, Honeyz, 911, Five and Atomic Kitten – to solve past problems and do a live performance at the London Hammersmith Apollo on 26 February. Due to the success, Liberty X returned for a full tour between 2013 and 2014. In 2017, Heaton, Jessica Taylor and Kelli Young reformed Liberty X again, but as a three-piece girl group, without Tony and Kevin. Since then, they continued touring at music festivals and Pride events.

In January 2023, Heaton competed in the fifteenth series of Dancing on Ice, paired with Łukasz Różycki, finishing in 10th place.

In spring 2023, Heaton joined the presenting team of shopping channel Ideal World.

In September 2023, Channel 4 announced Heaton as one of the contestants competing on Celebrity SAS: Who Dares Wins.

In December 2025 Michelle is appearing as Tinker Bell in The Further Pantomime Adventures of Peter Pan at the Billingham Forum.

== Personal life ==
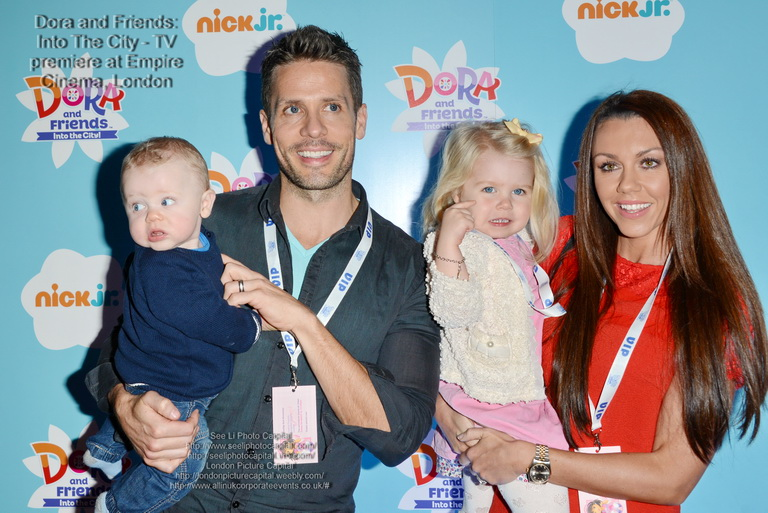
Hugh Hanley and Michelle Heaton and their children attend the NickJr UK Premiere of Dora and Friends: into the City! at the Empire Cinema London in 2014

Heaton was married to singer Andy Scott-Lee from October 2006 to June 2008. She married Irish businessman Hugh Hanley in the Bahamas in July 2010.

=== Health and alcohol abuse ===
In 2012, Heaton was diagnosed with a mutated BRCA2 gene and then found out that she had an 80% chance of developing breast cancer and a 30% chance of developing ovarian cancer. She underwent a double mastectomy and had breast reconstructive surgery in November 2012. During a part recorded and part live interview, Michelle stated that her daughter Faith has a 50% chance of inheriting the mutated gene that she has and her father is a BRCA2 carrier.

In 2021, Michelle appeared on the UK television programme Loose Women to speak about her alcohol addiction and her time in rehab.

== Filmography ==
=== Television ===
Year	Title	Role	Notes
2001	Popstars	Contestant	Series 1
2005	Totally Scott-Lee	Herself	Reality show
2006	Michelle & Andy's Big Day	Herself	Reality show
2007	You're a Star	Judge	Season 6
2008	Come Dine with Me	Contestant	Series 6
2008	Fáilte Towers	Contestant	
2009	Celebrity Big Brother	Contestant	Series 6
2013	The Big Reunion	Herself	Reality show
2023	Dancing on Ice	Contestant	Series 15
2023	Celebrity SAS: Who Dares Wins	Contestant	Series 5;
2025	Celebrity Masterchef	Contestant	

== Stage ==
Year	Title	Role
2010	Aladdin	Princess Jasmine
2010–2011	The Naked Truth	Gabby
2015–2016	Aladdin	Princess Jasmine
2025–2026	The Further Adventures of Peter Pan	Tinkerbell
