= Tony Lundon =

Irish singer (born 1979)

- Born: Anthony William James Lundon; 13 April 1979 (age 47); Galway, Ireland
- Occupations: Singer; songwriter; producer; director; television personality
- Years active: 2001–present
- Member of: Liberty X
- Spouse: Kellyann Leathem (m. 2010)

Anthony William James Lundon (born 13 April 1979) is an Irish singer, songwriter, producer and director and television presenter. He is best known as a member of pop group Liberty X. He was also a presenter with RTÉ (2007–2009), and a lead dancer with Lord of the Dance (1996–1999). Since 2010, Lundon has focused on a producing and directing career having established his own film and TV production company, The Cell Productions.

== Career ==
=== 2001–2007: Liberty X ===
In 2001, Lundon auditioned for the ITV reality television music competition Popstars, a show intended to form a new group from individual contestants, becoming one of the finalists. While the five winning contestants formed Hear'Say, the five runner-up contestants – Lundon, Michelle Heaton, Kevin Simm, Jessica Taylor and Kelli Young – formed the group Liberty and signed a multimillion-pound record contract with Richard Branson and V2 Records. Tony was the only member of the group who wasn't British. Liberty X released three studio albums and enjoyed eight Top 10 singles from 2001 to 2005: Their biggest hit, "Just a Little", reached number one in May 2002 and won them a BRIT Award for Best British Single, voted for by the public, and an Ivor Novello Award. "Thinking It Over", "Got to Have Your Love", "Song 4 Lovers", and "Holding on for You" all reached the top 5 in the UK Singles Chart. They split up in 2007 after selling over 3 million records worldwide.

=== 2008–present: Director and producer career and Liberty X reunion ===
From 2008 to 2009, Lundon presented a quiz show called Toast on Irish channel RTÉ Two on Saturday mornings. In 2010, he moved to New York to study film, and returned to the UK in 2012 to establish a film and TV production company, The Cell Productions. From 2013 to 2014, he returned briefly with Liberty X for a greatest hits tour.

On 7 October 2026, Liberty X posted a short video on their social media accounts, teasing a full reunion of the original line-up, with Lundon returning to the group.

== Personal life ==
Tony married his long-term girlfriend Kellyann Leathem in December 2010 at Ballintubber Abbey in County Mayo. They have three children – Leo, born in April 2012, and twins Rian and Max, born in February 2013. He is the great grand nephew of politicians William Lundon and the grand nephew of Thomas Lundon.
