= A Night to Remember (Shalamar song) =

1982 single by Shalamar

- Artwork for 1982 UK vinyl single

Single by Shalamar

from the album Friends
- B-side: "On Top of the World"
- Released: 1982
- Genre: R&B
- Length: 5:08
- Label: SOLAR
- Songwriters: Nidra Beard; Dana Meyers; Charmaine Sylvers
- Producer: Leon Sylvers III

Shalamar singles chronology
"I Can Make You Feel Good" (1982)	"A Night to Remember" (1982)	"There It Is" (1982)

Music video
- "A Night to Remember" on YouTube

"A Night to Remember" is a song by the American R&B group Shalamar. It was released in 1982 as the second single from their sixth studio album, Friends. The song was written by Nidra Beard of Dynasty, Dana Meyers and Charmaine Sylvers of the Sylvers. Jody Watley and Howard Hewett share lead vocals on the song.

== Charts ==
=== Weekly charts ===
Chart (1982)	Peak position
Ireland (IRMA)	9
UK Singles (OCC)	5
US Billboard Hot 100	44
US Dance/Disco Top 80 (Billboard)	15
US Hot Soul Singles (Billboard)	8

=== Year-end charts ===
Chart (1982)	Position
UK Singles (OCC)	53

== Certifications ==
Region	Certification	Certified units/sales
United Kingdom (BPI)	Silver	200,000^{‡}
^{‡} Sales+streaming figures based on certification alone.

== 911 version ==
"Night to Remember"

Single by 911

from the album The Journey
- Released: April 29, 1996
- Length: 4:16
- Label: Ginga
- Songwriters: Nidra Beard; Dana Meyers; Charmaine Sylvers
- Producer: Eliot Kennedy

911 singles chronology
"Night to Remember" (1996)	"Love Sensation" (1996)

Music video
- "Night to Remember" on YouTube

The English boy band 911 covered "A Night to Remember" (retitled "Night to Remember") and released it on April 29, 1996, as the lead single from their debut album, The Journey (1997). Their version peaked at number 38 on the UK Singles Chart.

=== Charts ===
Chart (1996)	Peak position
Scotland Singles (OCC)	9
UK Singles (OCC)	38

=== Release history ===
Region	Date	Format(s)	Label(s)	Ref.
United Kingdom	April 29, 1996	CD; cassette	Ginga	

== Liberty X version ==
"A Night to Remember"

Single by Liberty X

from the album X
- B-side: "Everybody Dance"; "A Holy Night" (acoustic)
- Released: November 14, 2005
- Length: 3:02
- Label: Virgin; Unique Corp
- Songwriters: Nidra Beard; Dana Meyers; Charmaine Sylvers
- Producer: Rod Gammons

Liberty X singles chronology
"Song 4 Lovers" (2005)	"A Night to Remember" (2005)	"X" (2006)

Music video
- "A Night to Remember" on YouTube

English-Irish pop group Liberty X covered "A Night to Remember" and released it as the second single from their third studio album, X (2005). The single was released in the UK on November 14, 2005, as the official Children in Need 2005 charity single, charting at number six on the UK Singles Chart.

=== Track listings ===
UK CD1

1. "A Night to Remember" (radio edit) – 3:02
2. "Everybody Dance" (radio edit) – 3:07

UK CD2

1. "A Night to Remember" (full length version) – 5:07
2. "Everybody Dance" (full length version) – 5:03
3. "A Holy Night" (unplugged acoustic) – 3:12
4. "A Night to Remember" (video)

Australian CD single

1. "A Night to Remember" (radio edit)
2. "A Night to Remember" (Methods of Flow club mix)
3. "A Night to Remember" (full length version)
4. "Everybody Dance" (full length version)
5. "Song 4 Lovers" (radio edit)

=== Charts ===
==== Weekly charts ====
Chart (2005–2006)	Peak position
Australia (ARIA)	94
Belgium (Ultratop 50 Flanders)	42
Ireland (IRMA)	19
Scotland Singles (OCC)	5
UK Singles (OCC)	6

==== Year-end charts ====
Chart (2005)	Position
UK Singles (OCC)	135

=== Release history ===
Region	Date	Format(s)	Label(s)	Ref(s).
Ireland	November 14, 2005	Digital download	Virgin; Unique Corp	
United Kingdom	November 14, 2005	CD; digital download	Virgin; Unique Corp	
Australia	February 20, 2006	CD	Rajon Music	

== Popular culture ==
- The Shalamar recording is also famously associated with the introduction of the moonwalk dance by Shalamar member Jeffrey Daniel on the UK music show Top of the Pops in June 1982, several months before Michael Jackson performed the move on the Motown 25: Yesterday, Today, Forever television special.
- For the season 3 finale of Girlfriends, the dance scene at the end of the episode originally aired with the Shalamar version of this song as background music, though for streaming and DVD releases, the rights to this song couldn't be secured.
- In the UK, this song has also been used for a television advert featuring the Harvester restaurant chain.
