= Popstars (British TV series) =

2001 British reality television series

- Genre: Reality competition
- Presented by: Davina McCall (finale)
- Judges: Nigel Lythgoe; Nicki Chapman; Paul Adam
- Narrated by: Daniel Hill
- Country of origin: United Kingdom
- Original language: English
- No. of series: 1
- No. of episodes: 13

Production
- Running time: 60–120 minutes (inc. adverts)
- Production company: LWT

Original release
- Network: ITV
- Release: 10 January – 18 March 2001

Related
- Soapstars; Popstars: The Rivals

Popstars is a reality music competition series that was broadcast on ITV in early 2001. It was the first British series of the international Popstars franchise and was billed as a documentary on the formation of a modern pop group. The programme began with audition rounds of aspiring singers performing covers of classic songs before a panel of judges. The best performers were selected to come to London for further rounds of auditions. Over the weeks, the judges eliminated various singers from the auditions until just a few singers were left in contention. In the final weeks, five contestants were chosen by the judges to form the new pop group Hear'Say. The programme then showed the group recording and promoting their first single, documenting their first ventures into the music industry.

The first series of Popstars proved popular with audiences, and a second series (named Popstars: The Rivals) followed in late 2002, but used a vastly different format, heavily influenced by Pop Idol, which had aired in the interim, to even greater success. Another follow-up (aired prior to The Rivals), Soapstars, used the original Popstars format to find actors for a new family in ITV's hit soap Emmerdale, but neither the show, nor the winners' roles in Emmerdale, were deemed a success.

== Format ==
Unlike the modern Idol or The X Factor television franchises, which are presented as singing contests with public votes, the original British series of Popstars was presented as a documentary, looking at the formation of a modern pop group from the auditions through to the first released single. There was no public vote, rather the panel of judges decided on which aspiring singers formed the group.

After the formation of the group (called Hear'Say), the programme documented the group recording and promoting their first single ("Pure and Simple"), with the series ending on the night the single charted in the UK Singles Chart (The single went straight to number 1).

Daniel Hill was the narrator of the programme and Davina McCall was the host of the final episode, which was broadcast live on the night that Hear'Say's first single entered the chart in a simulcast with Mark Goodier on the Top 40 singles chart show on BBC Radio 1.

=== Judges ===
- Nigel Lythgoe (dubbed "Nasty Nigel" by the British press), controller of entertainment and comedy at LWT, was the most outspoken judge on the panel. With a judging style to be emulated later by Simon Cowell, Lythgoe later went on to be head judge on So You Think You Can Dance?.
- Nicki Chapman, music promoter, who later featured in the judging panel of Pop Idol alongside Simon Cowell.
- Paul Adam, director of A&R at Polydor Records.

== Notable acts and performers ==
The winners of the series — Danny Foster, Myleene Klass, Kym Marsh, Suzanne Shaw and Noel Sullivan — formed the group Hear'Say. They went on to sell three million records worldwide, and scored two UK number-one singles before disbanding 18 months after their formation. Today, Klass is a television and radio presenter, while Marsh and Shaw are actors in television soap operas. Marsh also appeared as a contestant in the 2022 series of Strictly Come Dancing, while Shaw won the 2008 series of Dancing on Ice. Sullivan is a West End theatre performer, while Foster has made occasional appearances in reality television shows, including The Voice UK in 2013.

The other five finalists in the first Popstars series (who were not selected to join the group) formed their own pop group called Liberty X (consisting of Michelle Heaton, Tony Lundon, Kevin Simm, Jessica Taylor and Kelli Young). Liberty X went on to be commercially more successful than Hear'Say, achieving ten consecutive UK top 20 singles before their split in 2007.

Darius Danesh was another noted auditionee in the first series of Popstars. Danesh was seen as an early favourite on the show, but was eliminated halfway through the series after performing an 'alternative' version of Britney Spears's "...Baby One More Time" to the judges. Danesh went on to compete in the first series of Pop Idol, finishing third. He then had a successful solo career as a recording artist before becoming a West End theatre performer. Danesh died aged 41 in 2022 from respiratory arrest caused by inhalation of chloroethane he had used to treat chronic neck pain.

Contestant Warren Stacey was signed to Def Jam Recordings in 2001 and reached number 26 on the UK Singles Chart with his debut hit "My Girl, My Girl".

Louise Leach, another contestant eliminated during the bootcamp stage, later founded a children's dance school in Hendon, North London.

== Aftermath ==
The first series of Popstars proved popular with audiences, and was a ratings hit for ITV. However, Simon Fuller used the Popstars format as inspiration for his new TV show Pop Idol, which was broadcast on ITV soon after Popstars. Pop Idol, which included audience voting and live performances, proved even more popular than Popstars with the viewing public, and these elements were worked into the second series of Popstars (named Popstars: The Rivals) which included audience polls and live singing. In 2004, another show based on Popstars, which went on to become even more popular than Popstars or Pop Idol, was created by Simon Cowell — The X Factor.

== Episodes and ratings ==
Episode	Air date	Description	Official ITV rating (millions)	Weekly rank
1	10 January 2001	The first round of open auditions at venues around the UK.	7.75	23
2	13 January 2001	The second round of open auditions at venues around the UK.	7.01	24
3	20 January 2001	Boot Camp round in Birmingham where people are let go.	8.06	25
4	27 January 2001	Boot Camp in London where more people are let go.	8.81	21
5	31 January 2001	The judges select the final ten contestants on the last day of boot camp from who the band will be chosen.	10.51	15
6	3 February 2001 (18:45)	The judges discuss who from the last ten should make the final five.	11.35	8
7	3 February 2001 (21:20)	The final five to be in the band are told, with the others rejected. Each of the judges visit the contestants to tell them the news in their homes.	12.63	6
8	10 February 2001	The band move into their new shared house where they will stay for the duration of the recording and promotion of their first album. Also they travel to Norway to record their first album.	10.64	11
9	17 February 2001	The band start to get press attention.	8.47	20
10	24 February 2001	The band record their debut single "Pure and Simple".	8.83	18
11	3 March 2001		7.57	24
12	10 March 2001	The band start their promotion campaign for the release of their debut single.	8.06	20
13	18 March 2001	A live show tied in with the Top 40 chart to reveal the position of their first single.	7.22	24

== Home media ==
On 19 March 2001, following the conclusion of the series, a VHS featuring a compilation of clips from the series and interviews with the contestants was released, followed by a DVD release a week later. Both were released by Video Collection International and Granada Media.
