= Jessica Taylor =

English musical artist (born 1980)

Jessica Pietersen
- Born: Jessica Taylor; 23 June 1980 (age 46); Preston, Lancashire, United Kingdom
- Genre: Pop
- Occupation: Singer
- Years active: 1999–2007; 2013–present
- Member of: Liberty X
- Spouse: Kevin Pietersen (m. 2007)

Jessica Pietersen (née Taylor; born 23 June 1980) is an English singer. She is best known as member of the pop group Liberty X.

== Career ==
=== 1999–2007: Liberty X and hiatus ===
In a 1999 Pietersen starred in the musical Gigi playing the title role. In 2001, Pietersen auditioned for the ITV reality television music competition Popstars, a show intended to form a new group from individual contestants, becoming one of the finalists. While the five winning contestants formed Hear'Say, the five runner-up contestants – Pietersen (then Taylor), Tony Lundon, Kevin Simm, Kelli Young and Michelle Heaton – formed the group Liberty X, and signed a multimillion-pound record contract with Richard Branson and V2 Records. Liberty X released three studio albums and enjoyed seven Top 10 singles from 2001 to 2005: Their biggest hit, "Just a Little", reached number one in May 2002; "Thinking It Over", "Got to Have Your Love", "Song 4 Lovers", and "Holding on for You" all reached the top 5 in the UK Singles Chart. They split up in 2007 after selling over 3 million records worldwide.

During this time, Pietersen also appeared on BBC's Strictly Ice Dancing in 2005, finishing in second place, and Dancing on Ice in 2009, finishing in third place. After the split, Pietersen took a long hiatus from her artistic career.

=== 2013–present: Liberty X return ===
In 2013 Pietersen reunited with Liberty X for ITV2's reality show The Big Reunion, along with other pop groups of their time – B*Witched, Honeyz, 911, Five and Atomic Kitten – to solve past problems and do a live performance at the London Hammersmith Apollo on 26 February. Due to the success, Liberty X returned for a full tour between 2013 and 2014. Pietersen also appeared in game shows such as Hole in the Wall and The Chase, in which she faced Mark Labbett and won £75,000 in her individual chase. In 2017, Pietersen, Kelli Young and Michelle Heaton reformed Liberty X as a three-piece girl group, without Tony Lundon and Kevin Simm. Since then, Liberty X continued touring at music festivals and Pride events.

== Personal life ==
On 29 December 2007, she married England cricketer Kevin Pietersen at a service in Castle Combe. They have two children: Dylan Blake, born on 10 May 2010, and Rosie, born on 27 December 2015.

== Stage ==
Year	Title	Role
1999	Gigi	Gigi

== Filmography ==
=== Television ===
Year	Title	Role	Notes
2001	Popstars	Contestant	Season 1
2005	Strictly Ice Dancing	Contestant	Season 1
2009	Dancing on Ice	Contestant	Season 4
2013	The Big Reunion	Herself	
