= Liberty X =

British-Irish music group

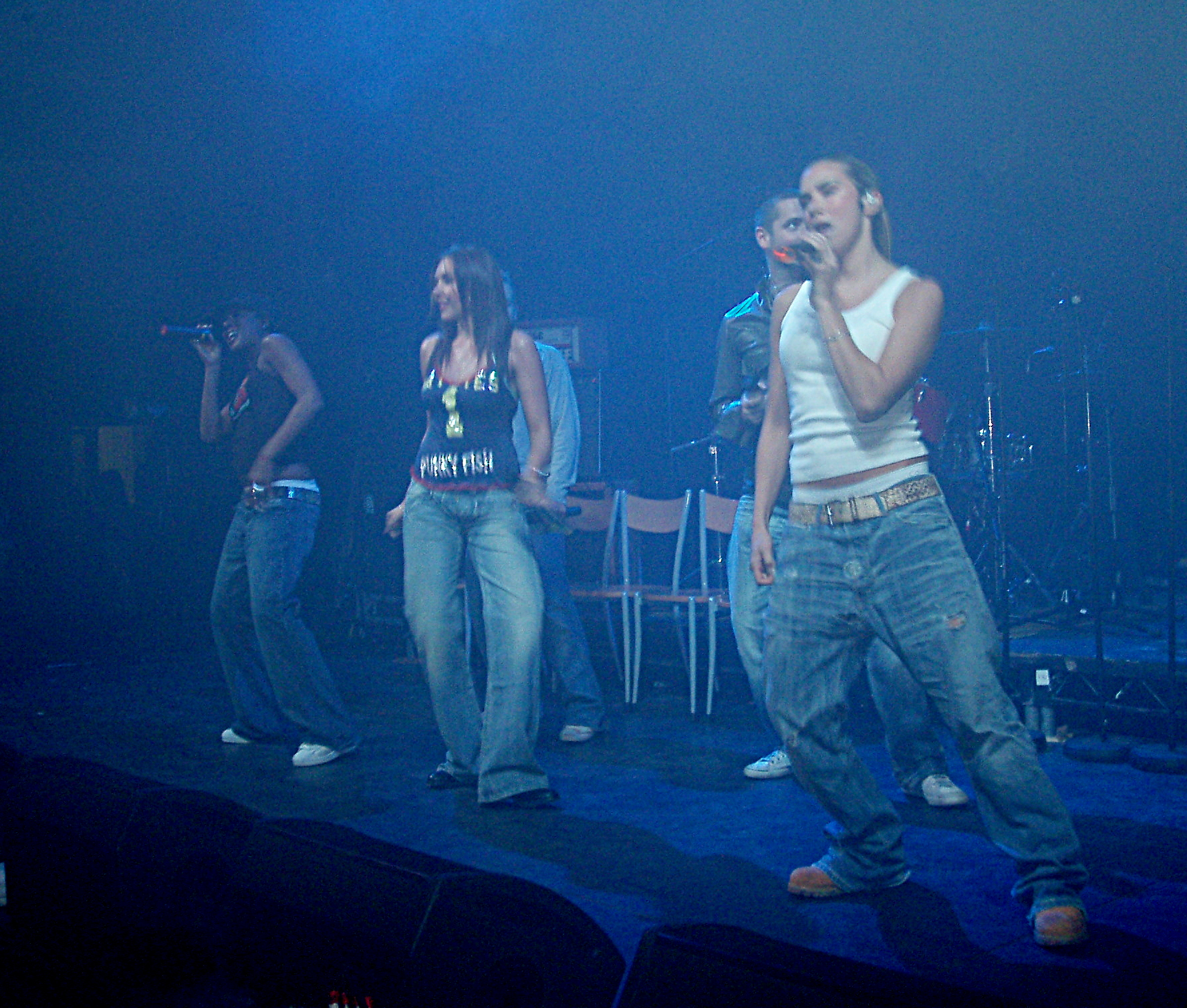
- Liberty X performing at Aberystwyth University May Ball in 2006. From left to right: Kelli Young, Michelle Heaton, Kevin Simm, Tony Lundon and Jessica Taylor

Background information
- Origin: London, England
- Genres: Pop; dance; R&B
- Years active: 2001–2008; 2012–2014; 2016–present
- Labels: V2; Virgin; Unique Corp Records
- Members: Jessica Taylor; Kelli Young; Michelle Heaton; Tony Lundon; Kevin Simm
- Website: kilimanjarolive.co.uk/liberty-x

Liberty X (originally called Liberty) are a British-Irish mixed group consisting of Michelle Heaton, Jessica Taylor, Kelli Young, Tony Lundon and Kevin Simm. They were formed in 2001 and achieved eight top ten singles in the UK, including a Brit award winning single "Just a Little". Their debut album sold over 1 million copies worldwide. The group has sold over 3 million records worldwide.

The group was formed by the five finalists of the 2001 ITV talent show Popstars who failed to make it into the winning group Hear'Say. The group released their debut album, Thinking It Over on 27 May 2002, featuring their biggest single "Just a Little" which gave them international success. They released their second studio album Being Somebody a year later on 3 November 2003, not matching the success of their debut. Following disappointing sales, the group were dropped and later signed with Virgin, released a final studio album X on 10 October 2005 and disbanded in 2007. Liberty X achieved ten consecutive UK top 20 singles, and various charting singles worldwide, leading to greater commercial success than Hear'Say. In 2013, the original line-up toured until 2014.

After a one-off reunion performance in May 2016, Heaton, Taylor and Young continued to perform as a trio until the original line-up reformed a second time in October 2026.

== History ==
=== 2000–2001: Popstars, formation and name change ===
While the five winning contestants of Popstars formed Hear'Say, the five runner-up contestants—Michelle Heaton, Tony Lundon, Kevin Simm, Jessica Taylor and Kelli Young—formed the group Liberty. The name Liberty was chosen to reflect the freedom the members experienced following their participation in Popstars. Amidst pejorative media commentary (including the term "Flopstars"), the act signed a multi-million-pound record contract with Richard Branson's independent record label, V2 Records.

Shortly after forming, Liberty received a legal challenge in the UK High Court from a funk R&B band, also called "Liberty", who achieved success in the 1990s, including being awarded Capital Radio Band of the Year, playing Wembley Arena, European tours and the release of albums in the US, Europe and UK. The original Liberty claimed that the newly formed Liberty was taking advantage of the goodwill that had been created by the former's success (known in English law as the "tort of passing off"). The final judgment was in favour of the funk R&B band and the ex-Popstars then asked readers of UK tabloid newspaper The Sun to suggest a new name. The winning name was "X Liberty", but the group used the entry as the basis for the official title, Liberty X.

=== 2001–2002: Thinking It Over and touring ===
On 24 September 2001, whilst the group were known as Liberty, they released their debut single, "Thinking It Over". It was an instant hit, reaching number five on the UK Singles Chart; the single's physical release featured remixes by the Wideboys and Boy George. The follow-up single, "Doin' It", released on 3 December 2001, peaked at number fourteen. Following a five-month gap, in which the band were involved with the High Court dispute regarding their original name, their third single, "Just a Little", was released. That song reached number one in the UK and became the ninth best-selling single of 2002, as well as becoming a top ten hit in several other countries. It was also the fifth most played song on the radio of the 2000s.

"Just a Little" preceded the release of Liberty X's debut album, Thinking It Over (originally called To Those Who Wait). The album reached number three on the UK Albums Chart, eventually selling over one million copies worldwide. Two more hit singles were released from the album: a cover of the 1989 track by electro funk group Mantronix, "Got To Have Your Love", which peaked at number two in the UK; and "Holding on for You", which peaked at number five. During 2002, the group headlined their first arena tour.

=== 2003–2005: Being Somebody and record label change ===
Following a short break, the group released "Being Nobody", a mash-up of Chaka Khan's "Ain't Nobody" and The Human League's "Being Boiled". The single was produced by Richard X and released under the billing of Richard X vs Liberty X, featured on Richard X's album Richard X Presents His X-Factor Vol. 1. "Being Nobody" reached number three on the UK singles chart. Proceeding their second album, Being Somebody, the group released "Jumpin", which peaked at number six. Being Somebody was released in November 2003, debuting at number twelve on the UK albums chart, but sold around 200,000 copies, significantly less than sales of their debut. The group released the album's final single, "Everybody Cries", in January 2004. The music video featured the group walking along disused railway lines, for which they were criticised by safety organisations. The single underperformed, reaching number thirteen.

The group took a hiatus following record-label issues, and each member decided to work on different individual projects. Simm appeared on Channel 4's The Games, competing in a series of sporting events (in which he placed second overall, behind Philip Olivier). Heaton appeared on ITV's ill-fated Celebrity Wrestling. Jessica Taylor appeared on ITV's Dancing on Ice. Lundon and Young took the time to work on new tracks for the band's third album, whilst producing and writing for other artists. During this period, The Sun newspaper reported that the group were to re-release Being Somebody with a cover of the 1990 hit "Back to Life", but this never materialised. They also released a cover version of the Kool & The Gang song "Fresh" which was released in a selection of European countries, but not the UK. It peaked at number 35 in France.

=== 2005–2007: X and split ===
In mid-2005, it was announced that Liberty X had left V2 Records and signed to independent label Unique Corp Records. Their third album, X, was released in October 2005. The first single, "Song 4 Lovers" (featuring Rev Run of Run–D.M.C., who also co-wrote the track), had been recorded when they were signed to V2, but they re-recorded it because V2 did not consider the song suitable as a Liberty X single. It was released in September 2005 and was well-received, achieving a large amount of television and radio airplay; it entered the UK charts at number five to become their first top ten hit in two years. X, however, peaked at number 27, failing to match the success of "Song 4 Lovers", and sold just 10,000 copies in the UK.

In late October, the group announced they had been asked to record the official 2005 Children in Need single, so they teamed up with producer Rod Gammons to record two tracks for double A-side release: "A Night to Remember" (a cover of the Shalamar song) and "Everybody Dance" (a (Chic cover). The group performed both singles live on the night, 18 November 2005. The double A-side single entered at number six in the UK; it also peaked at number 16 in France, becoming their biggest hit there since "Just a Little".

In May 2006, the band were featured in the line-up of Aberystwyth University May ball, alongside Chesney Hawkes and BodyRockers. Their set was cut short when a smoke bomb was set off during the first two minutes, filling the room with smoke. Firefighters gave the all-clear after 50 minutes, but Liberty X failed to reappear. Students were told the band were not returning to finish their set, met by jeers from the crowd, who had paid £37 each for the evening.

Liberty X returned in June 2006 with the single "X", a remixed version of the X album track. It peaked at number 47. The re-release of the album, which contains "A Night to Remember" and the new version of "X", failed to attract significant consumer interest. "X" also reached just number 89 in France. Despite rumours of splitting, Liberty X announced in 2006 that they were still together but concentrating on solo projects. Heaton wrote on the group's official site that they would be releasing a new single in the new year (2007), a song from a forthcoming film, but this did not happen. Heaton married her partner of four years, Andy Scott-Lee, Taylor got engaged to cricket star Kevin Pietersen, Simm appeared on Channel 4's The Games: Champion of Champions (competing for his team), and Lundon wrote tracks for what would have been the band's fourth album. On 20 May 2007, Liberty X posted a message on their website that said they would no longer record together after the tour:

All of us have separate projects we're working on and are excited about. We're still the best of friends and we'll still be doing all the dates on the current club tour. Also, we still intend to come together sometimes as Liberty X, for one-off events.

The group performed their last gig on 2 September 2007, alongside Liz McClarnon, Lisa Scott-Lee and Stonefoxx at the Wiltshire Crime Stoppers charity event held in the grounds of Bowood House, near Chippenham in Wiltshire. The band reunited in August 2008 to perform at Belfast's gay pride celebrations, the first time they had been on stage together in over a year.

=== 2012–2025: First reunion and touring as a trio ===
On 18 October 2012, it was announced that Liberty X, along with five other pop groups of their time – B*Witched, Honeyz, 911, Five and Atomic Kitten – would reunite for an ITV2 series called The Big Reunion, in which they would reveal about their individual stories about their life in the band before reforming for a gig at the Hammersmith Apollo, singing their greatest hits. The show, which aired from 31 January to 28 March 2013, followed the groups rehearsing for two weeks ahead of one major comeback performance at the London Hammersmith Apollo on 26 February.

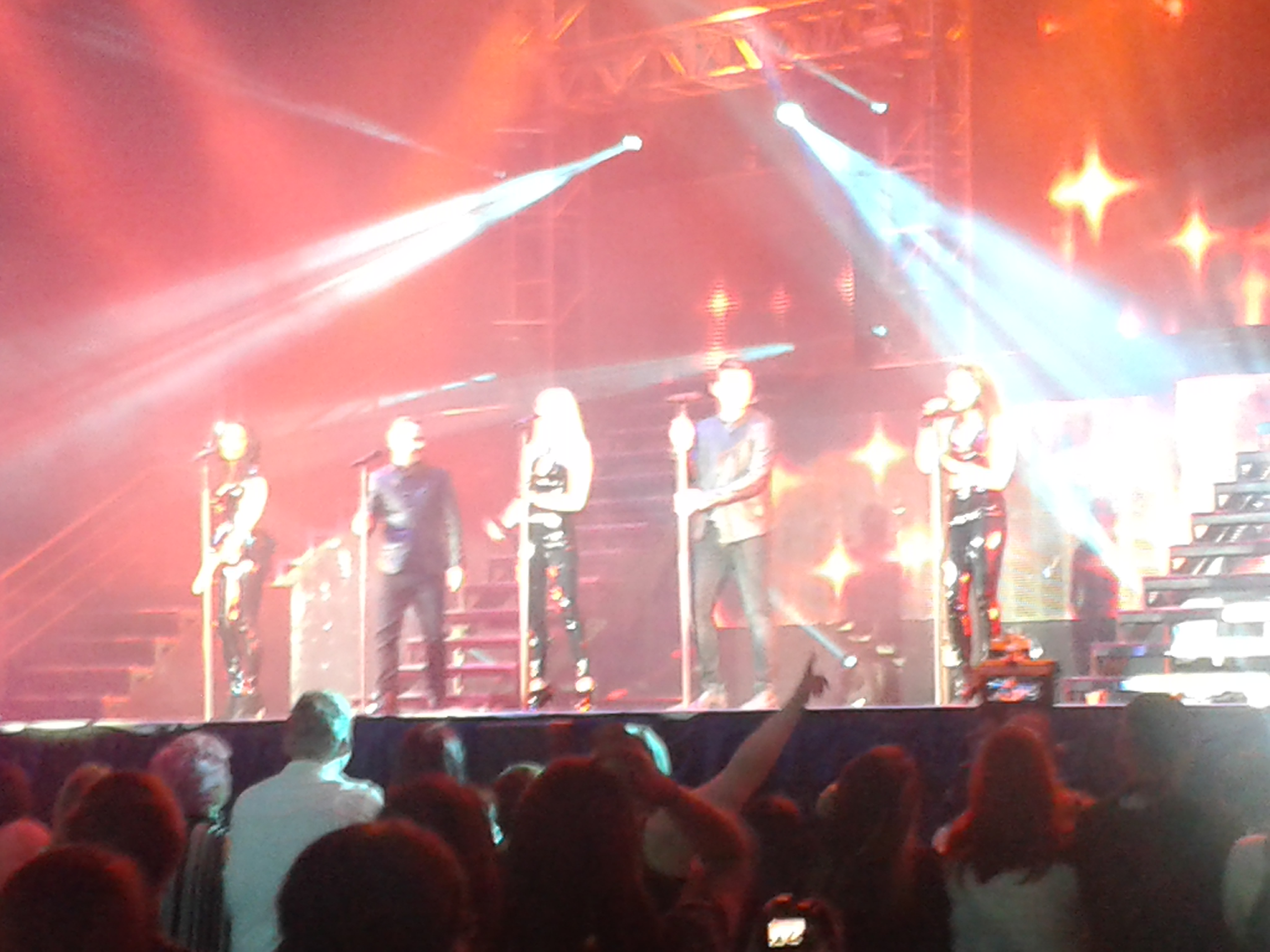
Liberty X performing live in Glasgow, as part of The Big Reunion arena tour.

Tickets for the Hammersmith Apollo reunion gig went on sale shortly after the premiere of the first episode of The Big Reunion and sold out in less than five minutes. Due to this, it was confirmed that a full UK tour was in the works, later confirmed again by Heaton on her Twitter account. The bands were originally only supposed to perform a one-off concert at London's Hammersmith Apollo on 26 February 2013, but when the entire show sold out in under five minutes shortly after the premiere of the first episode on 31 January 2013, rumours circulated that producers of the show were planning to tour the concert around the UK. On 11 February, it was confirmed that due to high demands for tickets and the popularity of the show, an arena tour around the UK would be taking place from 3–12 May 2013. On 27 March 2013 it was announced that the bands would perform a mini Christmas tour in December 2013.

On 29 March 2013, Heaton confirmed that Liberty X would yet again disband following the concerts, saying: "We talked about it, and we thought we've got so many children between us and quite a few things individually going on that we didn't want the pressure to be successful again. We just wanted to have fun. I know some of the other bands are planning to release new material but Liberty X, we are not planning to do that. We are just enjoying it for what it is. We're going to enjoy the gigs, all the performing and have fun and not take it too seriously – and know at the end, we go back to being mums and dads to our children. That's how it's different." Whilst on Lorraine on 12 September, however, Heaton said, "When we filmed [The Big Reunion: On Tour] in May, we said 'no' and we said we weren't going to do anything, but because we love it so much, I'd like to say 'never say never'. So maybe ask me again after Christmas." The group performed their final gig together on 15 December 2013.

In 2014, Liberty X signed to 365 Artists Management and toured at the Summer Tour. In 2016, Simm auditioned for the fifth series of The Voice UK, making it clear that he left Liberty X as he felt they were officially over since 2014. He was mentored by coach Ricky Wilson and subsequently won the competition. On 28 May 2016, Liberty X reunited for a one-off performance at Birmingham Pride 2016.

In 2017, Heaton, Taylor and Young reformed Liberty X as a three-piece girl group and have continued touring at music festivals and Pride events since. On 4 June 2023, the group performed a headline show at 'Mighty Hoopla'. In 2024, the group headlined at the Spalding Festival in Lincolnshire, between the 24 and 26 May.

=== 2026: Second reunion and Popstars: The Originals ===
On 7 October 2026, Liberty X posted a short video on their social media accounts, teasing a full reunion of the original line-up. The following day, they announced that they would be embarking on a joint arena tour with Hear'Say, Popstars: The Originals, in April and May 2027.

== Members ==
- Michelle Heaton (2001–2006, 2013–2014, 2016–present)
- Kelli Young (2001–2006, 2013–2014, 2016–present)
- Jessica Taylor (2001–2006, 2013–2014, 2016–present)
- Kevin Simm (2001–2006, 2013–2014, 2016, 2026–present)
- Tony Lundon (2001–2006, 2013–2014, 2016, 2026–present)

== Discography ==
- Thinking It Over (2002)
- Being Somebody (2003)
- X (2005)

== Tours ==
Headlining

- Just a Little Tour (2002–2003)
- Being Somebody Tour (2003–2004)
- The X Tour (2006)

Co-headlining

- Popstar Tour (2001) (with Hear'Say)
- The Big Reunion (2013) (with Five, 911, Atomic Kitten, Blue, B*Witched and Honeyz)
- Popstars: The Originals (2027) (with Hear'Say)
