= Thinking It Over (song) =

2001 single by Liberty X

Single by Liberty

from the album Thinking It Over
- B-side: "No Clouds"; "Greed"; "Let's Get Working"
- Released: 24 September 2001
- Recorded: 2001
- Genre: UK garage
- Length: 4:02
- Label: V2
- Songwriters: Tony Lundon; Kelli Young; Stephen Hart; Mary Susan Applegate; Jim Sullivan; Eddie Craig; Pete Devereux
- Producers: Pete Devereux; the Wideboys

Liberty singles chronology
"Thinking It Over" (2001)	"Doin' It" (2001)

"Thinking It Over" is a song by English-Irish pop group Liberty, before they became Liberty X. The UK garage song was produced by Pete Devereux (of Artful Dodger) and the Wideboys. It was co-written by band members Kelli Young and Tony Lundon and was released as Liberty's debut single in September 2001. In the United Kingdom, the single was a hit, reaching number five, but was not as successful internationally, peaking at number 29 in Ireland and number 81 in Australia.

== Background ==
While the five winning contestants of Popstars formed Hear'Say, the five runner-up contestants formed the group Liberty. The name Liberty was chosen to reflect the freedom the members experienced following their participation in Popstars. Amidst pejorative media commentary, including the term "Flopstars", the band proceeded to sign a multimillion-pound record contract with Richard Branson's independent record label, V2 Records.

In response to the media backlash and pushback from the record label, the band initially released the song as a white label promo. In an interview with The Vault in 2013, Young said, "We knew that we wanted to do an R&B/pop sound and everyone was telling us that was not an achievable thing [..] and no one was going to play it. So, we had to trick people. We released Thinking It Over on white label and we didn't put our name on it [...] We got lots of spot plays on the radio and all the clubs started playing it."

Thus, their debut single, "Thinking It Over", was released on 24 September 2001. It came backed with three B-sides: "No Clouds", "Greed" and "Let's Get Working", the latter of which has never been released on CD in the United Kingdom.

== Music video ==
The video for the track was filmed in a studio using green screen. It is set inside a skyline apartment in Manhattan, with the band performing in and around the lounge area. Despite the fact the video was filmed on a very low budget, it uses special effects to show and remove holographic images of the band from the apartment, to allow for different vocal sections of the song. It was the band's only video to be included on the physical single from the "Thinking It Over" era.

== Track listings ==
UK CD1

1. "Thinking It Over" (full length version) – 4:05
2. "No Clouds" (first version) – 4:14
3. "Greed" – 3:42
4. "Thinking It Over" (video)

UK CD2

1. "Thinking It Over" (Pete Devereux & The Wideboys club vocal remix) – 5:14
2. "Thinking It Over" (The Wideboys remix) – 5:31
3. "Thinking It Over" (Almighty 7-inch mix) – 3:43
4. "Thinking It Over" (Kinky Boy remix edit) – 5:14

UK cassette single

1. "Thinking It Over" (full length version) – 4:05
2. "Thinking It Over" (Kinky Boy remix) – 6:42
3. "Let's Get Working" – 4:15

Australian and New Zealand CD single

1. "Thinking It Over" – 4:05
2. "No Clouds" (first version) – 4:14
3. "Greed" – 3:42
4. "Thinking It Over" (Pete Devereux & The Wideboys club vocal remix) – 5:14
5. "Thinking It Over" (Kinky Boy remix edit) – 5:14
6. "Thinking It Over" (video)

== Charts ==
=== Weekly charts ===
Chart (2001–2002)	Peak position
Australia (ARIA)	81
Europe (Eurochart Hot 100)	24
Ireland (IRMA)	29
Scotland Singles (OCC)	8
UK Singles (OCC)	5
UK Indie (OCC)	2

=== Year-end charts ===
Chart (2001)	Position
UK Singles (OCC)	87

== Release history ==
Region	Date	Format(s)	Label(s)	Ref(s).
United Kingdom	24 September 2001	CD; cassette	V2	
Australia	28 January 2002	CD	V2	
