= Kelli Young =

English musical artist (born 1982)

- Born: Kelli Young; 7 April 1982 (age 44); Derby, England
- Genres: Pop
- Occupation: Singer
- Years active: 2001–present
- Member of: Liberty X
- Spouse: Iain James (m. 2011)

Kelli Young (born 7 April 1982) is an English singer. She is best known as member of the pop group Liberty X.

== Personal life ==
Kelli Young was born 7 April 1982. She went to Derby High School, Littleover, until she was 16. Her mother is Bajan.

In 2011, she married the songwriter Iain James, after five years of dating, and they have twin boys, born in July 2012.

== Career ==
=== 2001–2007: Liberty X and hiatus ===
In 2001, Young auditioned for the ITV reality television music competition Popstars, a show intended to form a new group from individual contestants, becoming one of the finalists. While the five winning contestants formed Hear'Say, the five runner-up contestants – Young, Tony Lundon, Kevin Simm, Jessica Taylor and Michelle Heaton – formed the group Liberty X and signed a multimillion-pound record contract with Richard Branson and V2 Records. Liberty X released three studio albums and enjoyed seven Top 10 singles from 2001 to 2005: Their biggest hit, "Just a Little", reached number one in May 2002; "Thinking It Over", "Got to Have Your Love", "Song 4 Lovers", and "Holding on for You" all reached the top 5 in the UK Singles Chart. They split up in 2007 after selling over 3 million records worldwide.

After the split, Young starred the ITV Christmas special Britain Sings Christmas in 2007, performing a cover version of Mariah Carey's "All I Want for Christmas Is You". She tried to sign a solo deal with a few labels, but failed and took a long hiatus from her artistic career.

=== 2013–present: Liberty X return ===
In 2013, Young reunited with Liberty X for ITV2's reality show The Big Reunion, along with other pop groups of their time – B*Witched, Honeyz, 911, Five and Atomic Kitten – to solve past problems and do a live performance at the London Hammersmith Apollo on 26 February. Due to the success, Liberty X returned for a full tour between 2013 and 2014. In 2017, Young, Jessica Taylor and Michelle Heaton reformed Liberty X again, but as a three-piece girl group, without Tony Lundon and Kevin Simm. Since then, they continued touring at music festivals and Pride events.

== Filmography ==
=== Television ===
Year	Title	Role	Notes
2001	Popstars	Contestant	Season 1
2013	The Big Reunion	Herself	

== Discography ==
Guest appearances
Title	Year	Other artists	Album
"Go Go"	2004	Billy Crawford	Big City
"All I Want for Christmas Is You"	2007	—N/a	Britain Sings Christmas
