= Song 4 Lovers =

2005 single by Liberty X

Single by Liberty X

from the album X
- B-side: "Yo DJ"
- Released: 26 September 2005
- Length: 3:29
- Label: Virgin; Unique Corp
- Songwriters: Tony Lundon; Joseph Simmons
- Producer: Tony Lundon

Liberty X singles chronology
"Fresh" (2004)	"Song 4 Lovers" (2005)	"A Night to Remember" (2005)

"Song 4 Lovers" is a song by English pop group Liberty X, released as the lead single from their third studio album, X (2005). The song features uncredited rap verses from Rev Run of Run-D.M.C. and was co-written and produced by Liberty X member Tony Lundon. The single was released on 26 September 2005 and peaked at No. 5 on the UK Singles Chart, becoming the band's highest-charting single from the album.

== Background ==
The decision to feature Rev Run (Joseph Simmons), of the rap group Run DMC, was made by band member Tony Lundon, who produced the track while the band was recording their third studio album for the V2 Records label, which was later scrapped due to a dispute between the band and their management. The single was quickly picked up by Unique Corp, who chose to release it as an attempt to create a new direction for the band. The single was also successful in Australia, where it received an exclusive release on 3 October 2005.

== Music video ==
The music video for the track was filmed in Amsterdam, Netherlands, Stockholm and in New York City. The video features the band performing with a gospel choir inside a church, as well as on the rooftop of a skyline building, intercut with scenes of Rev. Run performing his vocals to a group of youths on the streets of New York, as well as following the story of a woman who goes into labour whilst she is asleep. The video reached No. 2 on The Box in the United Kingdom, and No. 4 on MTV, with heavy airplay on all of the major music channels for over three months after its premiere. The video features on the physical version of the single, as well as appearing on the bonus DVD issued with X in Australia.

== Track listings ==
- UK CD1
1. "Song 4 Lovers" (single version) – 3:29
2. "Yo DJ" (album version) – 3:21
- UK CD2
1. "Song 4 Lovers" (radio edit) – 3:00
2. "Song 4 Lovers" (full length version) – 4:19
3. "Song 4 Lovers" (Fray Urban remix) – 4:00
4. "Song 4 Lovers" (video) – 3:00
- Australian CD single
1. "Song 4 Lovers" (full length version) – 4:19
2. "Song 4 Lovers" (Fray Urban remix) – 4:00
3. "Yo DJ" (album version) – 3:21
4. "Song 4 Lovers" (Solaris 12-inch club mix) – 7:37
5. "Song 4 Lovers" (Red Rhythm mix) – 3:17

== Charts ==
=== Weekly charts ===
Chart (2005)	Peak position
Australia (ARIA)	76
Belgium (Ultratip Bubbling Under Flanders)	3
Europe (Eurochart Hot 100)	19
Ireland (IRMA)	5
Scotland Singles (Official Charts)	3
UK Singles (Official Charts)	5

=== Year-end charts ===
Chart (2005)	Position
UK Singles (OCC)	75

== Release history ==
Region	Date	Format(s)	Label(s)	Ref.
United Kingdom	26 September 2005	CD single	Virgin; Unique Corp	
Australia	24 October 2005	CD single	Big; Rajon Music	
