= Just a Little (Liberty X song) =

2002 single by Liberty X

Single by Liberty X

from the album Thinking It Over
- B-side: "Breathe"; "Wanting Me Tonight"
- Released: 13 May 2002
- Length: 3.55
- Label: V2
- Songwriters: Michelle Escoffery; George Hammond Hagan; John Hammond Hagan
- Producer: The BigPockets

Liberty X singles chronology
"Doin' It" (2001)	"Just a Little" (2002)	"Got to Have Your Love" (2002)

"Just a Little" is a song by English-Irish pop group Liberty X. Written by singer Michelle Escoffery and produced by the BigPockets, it was released on 13 May 2002 as the third single from the group's debut studio album, Thinking It Over. The song proved to be Liberty X's breakthrough to mainstream and critical success, in the process overtaking fellow Popstars alumni Hear'Say in terms of success.

The song reached number one on the UK Singles Chart and reached the top 10 in Australia, Ireland, the Netherlands and New Zealand. The music video features the group as a gang of professional burglars (with two of its members, Jessica Taylor and Kelli Young, wearing tight black latex catsuits) who steal a diamond from an atrium at the Vintners' Hall in London.

== Background ==
"Just a Little" was written by Michelle Escoffery along with brothers George and John Hammond Hagan from The BigPockets. The song was initially composed with the intention of being pitched to Tom Jones, but was subsequently considered for Anastacia, before being shelved. It later came to the attention of Malcolm Dunbar, Liberty X's A&R representative at V2 Records, who persuaded Escoffery and The BigPockets to allow the group to record the track for their debut studio album, Thinking It Over (2002). The song was ultimately included on the album on the condition that The BigPockets would also serve as its producers. Liberty X member Kelli Young later recalled that the group immediately recognized the song's commercial potential upon hearing Escoffery's demo, stating that they believed it would become a number-one hit from the outset.

== Promotion ==
On occasions where the group has performed the song live on television, both Taylor and Young wear their catsuits from the original music video. In 2013, when the group performed during the Big Reunion, both members wore a different design of their catsuits.

== Chart performance ==
Following its release on 13 May 2002, the song debuted at number one on the UK Singles Chart on 19 May 2002, selling 153,000 copies in its first week. It stayed at number one for only a week, being replaced by Eminem's "Without Me". The record ended 2002 as the seventh-best-selling single of the year and has sold over 600,000 copies in the UK, allowing it to become a platinum-selling hit. At the 2003 BRIT Awards, the song won the Best British Single award. Outside the UK, the song experienced success in New Zealand, where it reached number two and stayed there for six non-consecutive weeks, ending the year as the third-best-selling single. It also charted within the top five in Australia, the Netherlands and Ireland, reaching numbers four, three and two, respectively.

== Music video ==
The music video for "Just a Little" was filmed in London, primarily at Vintners' Hall in the City of London. Directed by Alex Hemming and Shay Ola, the video was inspired by director Jon Amiel's heist film Entrapment (1999) and depicts the members of Liberty X as a team of professional thieves attempting to steal a valuable diamond

== Track listings ==
UK CD1

1. "Just a Little" – 3:56
2. "Breathe" – 3:47
3. "Thinking It Over" (Radio 1 acoustic session) – 3:55

UK CD2 (The Mixes)

1. "Just a Little" (Bump & Flex Electro Shock club mix) – 5:31
2. "Wanting Me Tonight" (Wookie full vocal mix) – 4:27
3. "Just a Little" (Almighty mix) – 6:50

UK cassette single

1. "Just a Little" – 3:56
2. "Just a Little" (Bump & Flex radio edit) – 3:22
3. "Thinking It Over" (The Wideboys featuring Fat Jack and Miss Shorty) – 5:15

European CD single

1. "Just a Little" – 3:56
2. "Just a Little" (Bump & Flex Electro Shock club mix) – 5:31

Australian CD single

1. "Just a Little" – 3:56
2. "Just a Little" (Bump & Flex Electro Shock club mix) – 5:31
3. "Just a Little" (Almighty mix) – 6:50
4. "Breathe" – 3:47
5. "Wanting Me Tonight" (Wookie Full vocal mix) – 4:27

== Charts ==
=== Weekly charts ===
Chart (2002)	Peak position
Australia (ARIA)	4
Australian Urban (ARIA)	1
Belgium (Ultratop 50 Flanders)	11
Belgium (Ultratip Bubbling Under Wallonia)	5
Europe (Eurochart Hot 100)	12
France (SNEP)	12
Germany (GfK)	24
Ireland (IRMA)	2
Italy (FIMI)	26
Netherlands (Dutch Top 40)	3
Netherlands (Single Top 100)	5
New Zealand (Recorded Music NZ)	2
Romania (Romanian Top 100)	92
Scottish Singles Sales (Official Charts)	2
Switzerland (Schweizer Hitparade)	16
UK Singles (Official Charts)	1
UK Indie (Official Charts)	1

=== Year-end charts ===
Chart (2002)	Position
Australia (ARIA)	34
Australian Urban (ARIA)	17
Belgium (Ultratop 50 Flanders)	44
Europe (Eurochart Hot 100)	68
France (SNEP)	91
Ireland (IRMA)	21
Netherlands (Dutch Top 40)	11
Netherlands (Single Top 100)	28
New Zealand (RIANZ)	3
UK Singles (OCC)	9

== Certifications ==
Region	Certification	Certified units/sales
Australia (ARIA)	Platinum	70,000^{^}
France (SNEP)	Gold	250,000^{*}
New Zealand (RMNZ)	Gold	5,000^{*}
United Kingdom (BPI)	Platinum	600,000
^{*} Sales figures based on certification alone.^{^} Shipments figures based on certification alone.

== Release history ==
Region	Date	Format(s)	Label(s)	Ref(s).
United Kingdom	13 May 2002	CD; cassette	V2	
Continental Europe	10 June 2002	CD	V2	
Continental Europe	17 June 2002	CD	V2	
Australia	17 June 2002	CD	V2	
United States	29 July 2002	Contemporary hit radio	V2	

== Usage ==
In 2015, the song was used in an advert from MoneySuperMarket. In 2026, Michelle Heaton, Kelli Young and Jessica Taylor performed a parody version of the song - "Just a Lidl..." - in an advert for discount supermarket Lidl.

== See also ==
- Catsuits and bodysuits in popular media
