= List of The Big Reunion episodes =

The Big Reunion is a British reality-documentary series that began airing on ITV2 on 31 January 2013. The show follows chart-topping groups that have reformed for the show and were big names in the UK pop music scene in the 1990s and early 2000s, and the show follows them through their two weeks of intensive rehearsals before they step back on stage for a comeback performance.

== Episode list ==
=== The Big Reunion ===
No. in season	Title	Featured band(s)	Directed by	Written by	UK viewers	Original release date
1	"Five & Liberty X"	Five & Liberty X	Shane Byrne; Mark Drake	Shane Byrne; Mark Drake	1,137,000	31 January 2013
2	"Atomic Kitten & 911"	Atomic Kitten & 911	Shane Byrne; Mark Drake	Shane Byrne; Mark Drake	1,305,000	7 February 2013
3	"B*Witched & Honeyz"	B*Witched & Honeyz	Shane Byrne; Mark Drake	Shane Byrne; Mark Drake	941,000	14 February 2013
4	"Five & Atomic Kitten"	Five & Atomic Kitten	Shane Byrne; Mark Drake	Shane Byrne; Mark Drake	826,000	21 February 2013
5	"911 & B*Witched"	911 & B*Witched	Shane Byrne; Mark Drake	Shane Byrne; Mark Drake	766,000	28 February 2013
6	"First Week Rehearsals"	All bands	Shane Byrne; Mark Drake	Shane Byrne; Mark Drake	778,000	7 March 2013
7	"Blue & Second Week Rehearsals"	All bands	Shane Byrne; Mark Drake	Shane Byrne; Mark Drake	911,000	14 March 2013
8	"Blue & Final Rehearsals"	All bands	Shane Byrne; Mark Drake	Shane Byrne; Mark Drake	811,000	21 March 2013
9	"The Big Reunion Goes Live"	All bands	Shane Byrne; Mark Drake	Shane Byrne; Mark Drake	1,152,000	28 March 2013

=== The Big Reunion: On Tour ===
No. in season	Title	Featured band(s)	Directed by	Written by	UK viewers	Original release date
1	"Final Rehearsals"	All bands	Shane Byrne; Mark Drake	Shane Byrne; Mark Drake	197,000	5 September 2013
2	"Trouble Backstage"	All bands	Shane Byrne; Mark Drake	Shane Byrne; Mark Drake	191,000	12 September 2013
3	"Final Shows"	All bands	Shane Byrne; Mark Drake	Shane Byrne; Mark Drake	231,000	19 September 2013

=== The Big Christmas Reunion ===
No. in season	Title	Featured band(s)	Directed by	Written by	UK viewers	Original release date
1	"The Big Christmas Reunion"	All bands	Shane Byrne; Mark Drake	Shane Byrne; Mark Drake	N/A	12 December 2013

=== Series 2 (2014) ===
All episodes directed by: Mark Drake & Shane Byrne

No. in season	Title	Featured band(s)	UK viewers	Original release date
1	"Damage & Girl Thing"	Damage and Girl Thing	560,000	6 February 2014
2	"Eternal & A1"	Eternal and A1	440,000	13 February 2014
3	"5th Story"	5th Story	759,000	20 February 2014
4	"3T"	3T		27 February 2014
5	"Rehearsals, Part 1"	All bands		6 March 2014
6	"Rehearsals, Part 2"	All bands	569,000	13 March 2014
7	"Rehearsals, Part 3"	All bands		20 March 2014
8	"The Gig"	All bands		27 March 2014

== Ratings ==
=== Series 1 ===
The first episode was seen by an average of 957,000 UK viewers, though it peaked at 1.2 million, making it ITV2's highest rated new show since 2008. The ratings increased for the second episode, which was watched by over 1.3 million, helping ITV2 finish third in the 9:00pm slot in front of BBC Two, Channel 4 and Channel 5. The overnight audience fell sharply to 670,000 for the third episode (but official figures were 941,000), being beaten in its timeslot by Junior Doctors: Your Life in Their Hands on BBC Three. Ratings continued to slide for episode 4, which overnight viewing figures showed was only watched by 630,000 viewers (less than half the audience of the episode of Celebrity Juice) that followed at 10:00pm, although the official rating was 826,000. The sixth episode brought in 606,000 viewers when up against the series finale of Mayday on BBC One and UEFA Europa League coverage on ITV. 638,000 watched episode 7 and 593,000 watched episode 8. The ratings shot back up for the final episode, as an audience of 974,000 tuned in to watch the highlights and behind-the-scenes action of the Hammersmith Apollo concert. Official ratings show that with the addition of ITV2+1, The Big Reunion averaged over 1 million viewers every week.

=== The Big Reunion: On Tour ===
The Big Reunion: On Tour was seen by a relatively low audience compared to its original series. Just 197,000 viewers watched the first episode, whilst episode 2 saw figures dip to 191,000. The third and final episode was seen by an audience of 231,000.

=== The Big Christmas Reunion ===
Ratings for The Big Christmas Reunion are unknown.

=== Series 2 ===
The first episode of the second series was seen by an audience of 463,000, less than half the audience of the series 1 premiere.
