= The Big Reunion series 2 =

The Big Reunion
- Season 2
- No. of episodes: 8

Release
- Original network: ITV2
- Original release: 6 February – 27 March 2014

Series chronology
- ← Previous; Series 1

The second series of the British reality-documentary series The Big Reunion began airing on ITV2 on 6 February 2014 and ended on 27 March 2014. The show features 'teen' bands, some of whom were big names in the UK pop music scene between the 1990s and early 2000s, and the programme follows them as they reunite for the first time in a decade and go through their two weeks of intensive rehearsals before finally stepping back on stage for a comeback performance.

The bands who reunited for the second series were 3T, A1, Damage, Eternal and Girl Thing. Additionally, Kenzie from Blazin' Squad, Dane Bowers from Another Level, and former soloists Adam Rickitt, Kavana and Gareth Gates, joined together to form the supergroup 5th Story.

== Background ==
Due to the massive success of the first series of The Big Reunion, which saw the reunions of Five, 911, Atomic Kitten, B*Witched, Blue, Honeyz and Liberty X, it was widely reported that a second series would be commissioned. Groups were rumoured to be reuniting for series 2 included Big Brovaz, Hear'Say, S Club 7, S Club Juniors, Busted, Mis-Teeq, East 17, All Saints, Eternal, A1, Cleopatra and Another Level. S Club 7 were reportedly in talks to reform for their own rival show to The Big Reunion. In regards to Hear'Say reuniting, Myleene Klass said, "I just can't imagine it. What are we going to do - sing 'Pure and Simple' on loop? It was nice and it was a great time in our lives, and where it was at that time is just perfect." It was also reported that Eternal could reform without Louise Redknapp, who initially walked away from the group in 1995.

On 27 December 2013, ITV announced that the six bands taking part in the show's second series would be A1, Eternal, Damage, 3T, Girl Thing and a supergroup called 5th Story, which consists of Gareth Gates, Another Level's Dane Bowers, Adam Rickitt, Kavana and Blazin' Squad's Kenzie. As previously reported, Eternal reunited for the show as a three-piece as Redknapp chose not to take part in their reunion. Additionally, Damage's Coreé Richards and A1's Paul Marazzi chose not to take part either, although Richards did appear on the show to talk about the band. Richards chose not to take part due to conflicts with the band.

Another Level were on the verge of signing up for the show, but Bowers' ex-bandmate Wayne Williams has since announced that he will not take part. In an interview with MTV UK, he said: "I decided not to participate in The Big Reunion because it wouldn't feel right to me...I'm in a totally different space in my life and I don't feel any need to look back."

S Club Juniors were also reportedly set to appear on the show (without original members Frankie Bridge and Rochelle Humes, who were on tour with The Saturdays) according to members Stacey Franks and Aaron Renfree, however ended up getting dropped from the lineup after fellow member Calvin Goldspink later decided not to take part.

On 26 January 2014, it was announced that series 2 would begin airing on ITV2 on 6 February 2014. The bands' comeback gig at the Hammersmith Apollo took place on 21 February 2014.

== Bands ==
- 3T
- A1 (without Paul Marazzi)
- Damage (without Coreé Richards)
- Eternal (without Louise Redknapp)
- Girl Thing
- 5th Story (supergroup consisting of Kenzie from Blazin' Squad, Dane Bowers from Another Level, Adam Rickitt, Kavana and Gareth Gates)

== Episodes ==
No. in season	Title	Featured band(s)	UK viewers	Original release date
1	"Damage & Girl Thing"	Damage and Girl Thing	560,000	6 February 2014
The documentary following the lives of musicians who played in pop bands originally active in the 1990s or early 2000s returns, with groups Eternal, A1, Damage, Girl Thing, 3T and 5th Story - a newly-formed boy band composed of solo singers Adam Rickett, Kavana, Gareth Gates, Another Level's Dane Bowers and Blazin' Squad's Kenzie. The first episode features R&B pioneers Damage and Simon Cowell's answer to the Spice Girls, Girl Thing, as they reveal the intense highs and lows of life at the peak of the pop world.
2	"Eternal & A1"	Eternal and A1	440,000	13 February 2014
Episode two features the biggest girl group of the early nineties, Eternal, who reveal why they've stayed quiet about their split for 15 years. Plus, Brit Award winners A1 discuss how they struggled to come to terms with a fatal accident involving their fans.
3	"5th Story"	5th Story	759,000	20 February 2014
Episode three features Big Reunion supergroup 5th Story, revealing the highs and lows of pop stardom for Gareth Gates, Dane Bowers, Adam Rickitt, Kavana, and Kenzie. In the 90s and 00s, the members of 5th Story clocked up 27 top ten hits and six number ones. Now, the lads are back to tell their stories as they create a brand new group.
4	"3T"	3T		27 February 2014
The show travels to Los Angeles to focus on the band 3T. Members Taryll, Taj and TJ Jackson reflect on living in the shadow of their uncle Michael Jackson and recall the extreme highs and lows of their time in the public eye.
5	"Rehearsals, Part 1"	All bands		6 March 2014
Newly formed boy band 5th Story hit the recording studio for the first time, but doubts remain over whether they will gel. Meanwhile, Damage and Girl Thing have explosive reunions.
6	"Rehearsals, Part 2"	All bands	569,000	13 March 2014
5th Story have problems at rehearsals, Kavana is unimpressed with girl group Eternal's attitude and all the acts meet for the first time. Meanwhile, Damage reunite - with explosive results.
7	"Rehearsals, Part 3"	All bands		20 March 2014
The groups head to the rehearsal studios as they prepare to step back into the spotlight. However, a night out ends in chaos when hangovers derail the schedule, and one member of newly formed boy band 5th Story is on the edge of a breakdown.
8	"The Gig"	All bands		27 March 2014
The wait is over. The six Big Reunion groups step on stage for the first time in over 10 years for a monumental one off gig. 5th Story are in chaos as Kavana walks out on the eve of the gig. Things aren't so Pure & Simple for Girl Thing as nerves get the better of them, and Eternal get a surprise call from an old friend.

== Reception ==
=== Ratings ===
The first episode of the series was seen by an audience of 463,000, less than half the audience of the series 1 premiere. The second episode fell even further, bringing in 324,000 viewers.

Summary of episode ratings
Episode no.	Title	Date	Official ITV2 rating	ITV2 weekly rank	Share (%)	Official ITV2 +1 rating	Total ITV2 viewers
1	"Damage & Girl Thing"	6 February 2014	560,000	4	2.0	N/A	560,000
2	"Eternal & A1"	13 February 2014	440,000	5	1.4	N/A	440,000
3	"5th Story"	20 February 2014	759,000	3	2.8	202,000	961,000
4	"3T"	27 February 2014	446,000	8	1.5	N/A	446,000
5	"Rehearsals, Part 1"	6 March 2014	N/A	N/A		N/A	N/A
6	"Rehearsals, Part 2"	13 March 2014	569,000	6		N/A	569,000
7	"Rehearsals, Part 3"	20 March 2014	437,000	8		N/A	437,000
8	"The Gig"	27 March 2014	1,009,000	2		N/A	1,009,000
Series average							

=== Critical reception ===
Reviewing the first episode, Digital Spy's Catriona Wightman wrote, "if this first episode proved anything, it's that The Big Reunion is not about the music. It never has been, really - our obsession with Abz was really down to his hats, farming and tough post-fame life. And with Girl Thing, their story of the hype, the arguments and the crashing fall was an interesting enough insight into the world of the music business that we stopped caring about the fact that they never made it big. Honestly, that was kind of the point." In a negative review, the Daily Mirror's Kevin O'Sullivan said, ""This rigidly formulaic show is simply repeating itself. But take it away hopeless narrator Andi Peters: They scaled the icy unforgiving edifice of the artistic mountain we call pop..." Who writes this crap?'

In The Guardian, Joe Stone wrote that The Big Reunion "should be screened in all stage schools as a warning."
