= You can run, but you can't hide =

You can run but you can't hide may refer to:

- "He can run, but he can't hide", a statement attributed to American boxer Joe Louis
- You Can Run But You Can't Hide, a book by Duane "Dog" Chapman
- "You Can Run (But You Can't Hide)", a 1979 song by (The) Razz, co-written by Tommy Keene
- "You Can Run But You Can't Hide", a 2001 song from Girl Thing's Girl Thing
- You Can Run But You Can't Hide (Podes Fugir Mas Não Te Podes Esconder), a 2001 album by Da Weasel
- You Can Run But You Cannot Hide International, a Christian youth ministry based in Minnesota

== See also ==
- You can click, but you can't hide, a campaign against peer-to-peer file sharing of films
