= Not a Love Song =

Single by Wonderland

from the album Wonderland
- Released: 4 March 2011
- Recorded: 2010
- Genre: Pop, country pop
- Length: 3:25
- Label: Mercury
- Songwriters: Sheppard Solomon, Adam Argyle, Wonderland
- Producer: Eliot James

Wonderland singles chronology
"Not a Love Song" (2011)	"Starlight" (2011)

"Not a Love Song" is the debut single by Irish girl group Wonderland, from their debut album Wonderland. It is also on the EP Introduction to Wonderland. It was released on 4 March 2011. The song debuted at number 22 on the Irish Singles Chart.

== Background ==
They stated in their interviews that they co-written the song with Sheppard Solomon in 2009. Band member Jodi Albert described the song as "fun and cheeky". She added that it has a "rocky edge", but with a bit of country in it too and Band member Corrina Durran says “We’re quite casual and laid back girls. We sing music that’s quite heartfelt and we really want to get into our performances.” Entertainment Focus stated this was just a promotional single, having "Starlight" as the first official single.

== Formats and release ==
The song was first announced as the debut single on the band's documentary Louis Walsh and Kian Egan's Next Big Thing - Wonderland. The management said they were thorned into two songs and finally decided '"Not a Love Song" as the single.

"Not a Love Song" was not just released into a single format but was also included on the band's debut extended play or EP Introduction to Wonderland The EP consists of three songs with "Not a Love Song", their cover version of "Need You Now" and an original ballad song "Nothing Moves Me". It also has the live acoustic versions of the three songs. It was released on the same day as the single. Both single and EP were only released digitally.

There was also a promotional release of remix of the said song. This was remixed by 7th Heaven, Club Junkies, and Manhattan Clique. All of the remix have its club mix and radio edits. It was sent to the clubs for promotion since February 2011. The remixes were not officially released on the market. Also, a demo version has had been posted on their official SoundCloud page.

== Live performances ==
The girls performed the song on RTÉ’s Late Late Show, ITV's Loose Women, BBC's The National Lottery Draws, ITV's Lorraine, ITV's The Alan Titchmarsh Show, BBC's Blue Peter.

== Reception ==
Durran said they had received a positive reception to the song when they sang it on the Westlife tour.

The music reporter of Digital Spy Robert Copsey gave for the single. He stated: "B*Witched, Bellefire, Six (you know, from Irish Popstars)... the chart success of girlbands from the Emerald Isle is patchy at best. The thing they all have in common? One Louis Walsh, who, ever determined to showcase some homegrown talent, has paired up with Westlife's Kian Egan to form five-piece girl group Wonderland. But does their debut have what the XF judge would consider, "the likeability factor"? If nothing else, it's certainly got balls. "If you're gonna write a love song/ I don't wanna hear one," they croon over a part Taylor Swift, part Corrs country-folk-pop melody as they urge their men to forgo icky romantic gestures and instead play things decidedly cooler. In fact, given their alternative suggestion - "If you really wanna use your mouth why don't you kiss me instead?" - we'd hazard a guess that their balls are twice as mighty as Louis's and Westlife's. Now there's a mental image we didn't need." While Leeds' City Dweller Magazine described it "as an uptempo song, a women-empowered song about not wanting to settle down." Popledge ranked it adding: "Their first song is a kinda Corrs/Taylor Swift affair, pop with a slight country twang to it…but it’s actually ‘Not a Love Song’ it paints them as kinda bad-ass girls, ‘if you wanna write a love song I don’t wanna hear it..’ The song is ok and the ladies can all sing but it’s just ok…I’m not sure if it was the best song to launch them with, it will be interesting to hear their next choice of single."

== Chart performance ==
The song debuted at number 22 on the Irish Singles Chart. The decision to focus on the release of EP to release the single on a Friday (same date with EP release) in the UK resulted in only two days of sales contributing to the official chart as opposed to the usual seven. It therefore failed to chart in the UK, selling 1,432 copies in its first two days. Despite the situation, the single peaked at #20 on Ireland and #46 on UK and #13 and #31 on Pop Charts of the said countries respectively.

== Music video ==
The music video was released on their official YouTube site on 3 December 2010. The video was directed by Nigel Dick. This was his 326th music video. It was shot on 31 October 2010 on Ventura Farms, Potrero Rd., Thousand Oaks, California, USA. The producer was Phil Barnes and Fuliane Petikyan for Bikini/DNA production company. Other credits are the following: Assistant director: Lennie Appelquist, Director of Photography: Eric Maddison, B Camera Operator: D.P. Quickly, Phil Barnes, Capture system: Arri Alexa, Canon D7, Art Director: Robert Romanus, Stylist: Nicole Houston, Make-Up: Lica Fensome, Editor: Warren MeNeeley and Telecine: Simone Grattarola at Rushes, London. Behind the scenes of the video was published under their YouTube site.

== Track listing ==
Introduction to Wonderland EP

1. "Not a Love Song"
2. "Not a Love Song" (Live Acoustic)
3. "Need You Now" (Live Acoustic)
4. "Nothing Moves Me" (Live Acoustic)
5. "Not a Love Song" (Music Video)

Not a Love Song Remixes

1. "Not a Love Song" (7th Heaven Club Mix)
2. "Not a Love Song" (7th Heaven Radio Edit)
3. "Not a Love Song" (Club Junkies Club Mix)
4. "Not a Love Song" (Club Junkies Radio Edit)
5. "Not a Love Song" (Manhattan Clique Club Mix)
6. "Not a Love Song" (Manhattan Clique Radio Edit)

The remix bundle was never released to the public.

== Charts ==
Chart (2011)	Peak position
Ireland (IRMA)	22
UK Singles (Official Charts Company)	144
