= 5th Story =

British supergroup

- Origin: London, England
- Genres: R&B, pop
- Years active: 2013–2014
- Past members: Dane Bowers; Gareth Gates; Kavana; Kenzie; Adam Rickitt

5th Story were an English supergroup consisting of 1990s-early 2000s pop stars Dane Bowers, Gareth Gates, Kavana, Kenzie and Adam Rickitt. They were formed in 2013 exclusively for the second series of the ITV2 reality-documentary series The Big Reunion.

== History ==
Due to the success of the first series of the ITV2 reality-documentary series The Big Reunion (which saw the reunions of Five, 911, Atomic Kitten, B*Witched, Blue, Honeyz and Liberty X), a second series was commissioned. On 27 December 2013, ITV announced that the groups reforming for the second series would be A1, Eternal, Damage, 3T and Girl Thing. It was also announced that the producers of the show had formed a supergroup called 5th Story, comprising soloists Gareth Gates, Adam Rickitt and Kavana, and Another Level's Dane Bowers and Blazin' Squad's Kenzie.

Prior to rehearsals for the comeback gig, 5th Story spent a week in the recording studio to record one of each member's hit songs: "I Breathe Again" by Rickitt, "Spirit in the Sky" by Gates, "Freak Me" by Bowers' ex-band Another Level, "I Can Make You Feel Good" by Kavana, and "Crossroads" / "Flip Reverse" by Kenzie's ex-band Blazin' Squad. These songs have made it on the Big Reunion – The Official Album as part of Disk One, released on 28 February 2014. 5th Story did their first ever gig together at the Hammersmith Apollo on 22 February 2014. The group was managed for the duration of the series by music manager, Paul DH Baylay, who also featured on screen in several episodes with the group.

On 20 March 2014, it was announced that 5th Story and the other boy bands from both series of The Big Reunion—Five, 911, Blue, A1, 3T and Damage—would go on a UK arena tour in October 2014.
