= Girls on Top =

Girls on Top may refer to:

- Girls on Top (British TV series), a 1985–1986 British comedy television series
- MTV Girls on Top, a 2016 Indian television series
- Girls on Top (album), 2005 album by BoA, or its title track
- "Girls on Top" (song), 2000 song by Girl Thing
- Mädchen, Mädchen, a 2001 German film also known as Girls on Top
- Girls on Top, a pseudonym used by Richard X
- Girls on Top, a South Korean girl group

== See also ==
- Woman on top, sex position
- Woman on Top, 2000 romantic comedy film
