= The Big Reunion =

- Also known as: The Big Reunion: On Tour; The Big Christmas Reunion
- Genre: Reality
- Created by: Michael Kelpie
- Directed by: Shane Byrne; Mark Drake
- Starring: Five; 911; Atomic Kitten; B*Witched; Honeyz; Liberty X; Blue; 3T; A1; Damage; Eternal; Girl Thing; 5th Story
- Narrated by: Andi Peters
- Theme music composer: The Audio Freaks
- Country of origin: United Kingdom
- Original language: English
- No. of series: 2
- No. of episodes: 21 (list of episodes)

Production
- Executive producers: Michael Kelpie; Phil Mount
- Producer: Kevin Lane
- Running time: 60 mins (inc. adverts)
- Production companies: ITV Studios (2013); Potato (2013–14)

Original release
- Network: ITV2
- Release: 31 January 2013 – 27 March 2014

The Big Reunion is a British reality-documentary series that began airing on ITV2 on 31 January 2013. The show featured chart-topping bands who were big in the UK pop music scene between the 1990s and early 2000s, and the programme followed them as they reunited for the first time in a decade and went through their two weeks of intensive rehearsals before finally stepping back on stage for a comeback performance.

The first series featured Five, 911, Atomic Kitten, B*Witched, Blue, Honeyz and Liberty X. Another mini-series, entitled The Big Reunion: On Tour, aired from 5–19 September 2013. It followed the groups embarking on their arena tour, and other behind-the-scenes action. The Big Christmas Reunion, a Christmas special, also aired on 12 December 2013. It saw the bands recording a Christmas charity single for Text Santa and looked at how Text Santa helped vulnerable people.

The Big Reunion proved to be an unexpected hit for ITV2; the first episode brought in 1.2 million viewers, becoming the channel's highest-rated premiere in five years, and the show went on to achieve over 1 million viewers every week, making it one of the channel's most popular shows. Due to the huge success, a second series was commissioned. The second series, which premiered on 6 February 2014, featured 3T, A1, Damage, Eternal, Girl Thing, and a supergroup called 5th Story, which consisted of Kenzie from Blazin' Squad, Dane Bowers from Another Level, and former soloists Adam Rickitt, Kavana and Gareth Gates.

== Production ==
=== Conception ===
On 18 October 2012, it was announced that pop groups Five, 911, Atomic Kitten, B*Witched, Honeyz and Liberty X—who were big names in the UK pop music scene in the 1990s and early 2000s—would be reuniting for an ITV2 documentary series entitled The Big Reunion, followed by a comeback performance at some point in 2013.

=== Personnel ===
Angela Jain, ITV's Director of Digital Channels, and Katy Thorogood, ITV's factual and daytime commissioner, ordered The Big Reunion. ITV Studios' Kevin Lane acted as series producer, while creative director Michael Kelpie and Phil Mount acted as executive producers. Kelpie said: "To reunite these bands, tell the stories of what has happened to them since their heyday and follow them as they prepare to step back on the stage for the first time in a decade is a dream come true." Jain added, "We are thrilled to bring the stories of these pop groups up to date...A lot has happened in the time these bands have been apart - marriages, divorces and changes in careers - and who knows quite what will happen when they reunite!"

The show was narrated by former Live & Kicking presenter Andi Peters. During rehearsals for the comeback performance and arena tour, Paul Domaine acted as the bands' choreographer, while Yvie Burnett, who formerly worked on The X Factor and currently works on The Voice UK, acted as their vocal coach.

== Series overview ==
=== Series 1 (2013) ===
Filming for the show began in October 2012, featuring the members of each band telling their individual stories about their bandmates and displaying their own personal lives nowadays, and later meeting together again for the first time in several years. Whilst all the other bands reunited several weeks before rehearsals began, Liberty X did not reunite until the night before, due to Michelle Heaton undergoing a double mastectomy. The rehearsals for the comeback performance took place at the Lilian Baylis Studio in London, beginning on 7 January 2013 and continuing for two weeks. Atomic Kitten's Kerry Katona was the last to arrive for rehearsals due to her being on This Morning talking about Dancing on Ice. The comeback performance took place at the Hammersmith Apollo on 26 February, and was broadcast on ITV2 on 28 March.

Atomic Kitten's three founding members, Katona, Liz McClarnon and Natasha Hamilton, took part in the show. Honeyz's reformation came in the form of a third different line-up that consisted of founding members Célena Cherry and Heavenli Denton, and Mariama Goodman, who replaced Denton when she initially left the group in 1999, and vice versa when Goodman herself departed in 2000. Original member Naima Belkhiati decided not to take part in the reunion, so Cherry called up Goodman as her replacement. Additionally, Five only reunited as a four-piece as founding member and lead singer Jason "J" Brown backed out at the last minute, claiming that he no longer wants to be in the public eye, having initially attended previous meetings for the show. During filming for the show, the remaining four members, Abz Love, Sean Conlon, Ritchie Neville and Scott Robinson, discussed the possibility of auditioning a new fifth member. After they put out a notice, three people auditioned to join the band – ex-Northern Line member Dan Corsi, model and singer Luke Boyden, and Nathan Rawlings, who made it to judges' houses on The X Factor in 2010 as part of boy band The Reason. All auditionees were unsuccessful, however; Five continued on with just the four of them.

The first three episodes featured Five, Liberty X, Atomic Kitten, 911, Honeyz and B*Witched telling their backstories of their time in their respective groups and about their lives since splitting up. The next two episodes featured the groups reuniting for the first time in a decade and discussing how they felt about performing again. The next three episodes were concerned with rehearsals for the comeback gig, midway through which Blue joined the show and told their stories as well. The final episode featured the sold-out comeback gig and backstage action.

When asked why they chose to join the comeback gig, Blue said: "Phil Mount, The Big Reunion's producer, has always been a long-time supporter of the band, giving us our first TV break, he really wanted us to be surprise special guests announced halfway through the series and to perform on the Hammersmith Apollo show. This sounded like a lot of fun, giving us the perfect chance to perform together again in the UK for our fans and reconnect with the other acts, many of whom friends of ours and started out around the same time as us. For us the 'Big Reunion' is a great chance for all of us bands to come together for one BIG party on Tuesday night!" Reaction to Blue joining The Big Reunion was initially negative among the other groups, as well as fans of the show, due to the fact that, unlike them, Blue were not reuniting, having already been back together since 2011 and represented the United Kingdom in the Eurovision Song Contest 2011.

A three-week mini-series called The Big Reunion: On Tour aired in September 2013, featuring the bands as they embarked on their arena tour. Founding Five member Jason "J" Brown also returned to hit back at accusations made by his bandmates. On 12 December, a Christmas special called The Big Christmas Reunion aired. It features the bands uniting to recording a cover of "I Wish It Could Be Christmas Everyday" for Text Santa. It also gives an insight into the work undertaken by Text Santa charities Age UK, Barnardo's, BeatBullying, the British Heart Foundation, CLIC Sargent and Help the Hospices.

=== Series 2 (2014) ===
Due to massive ratings success, a second series was commissioned. Groups rumoured to be reuniting for series 2 included Big Brovaz, Hear'Say, S Club 7, S Club Juniors, Busted, Mis-Teeq, East 17, All Saints, Eternal, A1, Cleopatra and Another Level. S Club 7 were also reportedly in talks to reform for their own rival show to The Big Reunion. During an interview on ITV Breakfast programme Lorraine in February 2013, Myleene Klass said in regards to Hear'Say reuniting, "I just can't imagine it. What are we going to do - sing 'Pure and Simple' on loop? It was nice and it was a great time in our lives, and where it was at that time is just perfect." It was also reported that Eternal could reform without Louise Redknapp, who initially walked away from the group in 1995.

On 27 December 2013, ITV announced that the six bands taking part in the show's second series would be A1, Eternal, Damage, 3T, Girl Thing and a supergroup called 5th Story, comprising Blazin' Squad's Kenzie, Another Level's Dane Bowers, and former soloists Gareth Gates, Adam Rickitt, and Kavana. As previously reported, Eternal reunited for the show as a three-piece as Redknapp chose not to take part in their reunion. Additionally, Damage's lead singer Coreé Richards and A1's Paul Marazzi chose not to take part either, although Richards did appear on the show to talk about the band and meet with his bandmates one last time.

Another Level were on the verge of signing up for the show, but Bowers' ex-bandmate Wayne Williams chose not to take part. In an interview with MTV UK, Williams said: "I decided not to participate in The Big Reunion because it wouldn't feel right to me...I'm in a totally different space in my life and I don't feel any need to look back." Another ex-bandmate Mark Baron, who now works for Alan Sugar's company Amsprop, had been forced to pull out due to Sugar not allowing him time off work. Bowers told the Daily Mirror: "Another Level were supposed to do it but then Mark said he couldn't because of work. He's married to Alan Sugar's daughter and works for him. You don't say no to Alan Sugar. I was a bit annoyed because he pulled out right at the end. Surely he would have known earlier. But his loss is my gain."

S Club Juniors were also reportedly set to appear on the show (without original members Frankie Bridge and Rochelle Humes, who were on tour with The Saturdays) according to members Stacey Franks and Aaron Renfree, however ended up getting dropped from the lineup after fellow member Calvin Goldspink later decided not to take part.

On 26 January 2014, it was announced that series 2 would begin airing on ITV2 on 6 February 2014.

== Bands ==
=== Series 1 ===
- Five (without Jason "J" Brown)
- 911
- Atomic Kitten (first line-up)
- B*Witched
- Honeyz (Célena Cherry and Heavenli Denton from original line-up, Mariama Goodman from second line-up)
- Liberty X
- Blue (joined later during episode 7 and performed at some of the concerts)

=== Series 2 ===
- 3T
- A1 (without Paul Marazzi)
- Damage (without Coreé Richards)
- Eternal (without Louise Redknapp)
- Girl Thing
- 5th Story (supergroup consisting of Kenzie from Blazin' Squad, Dane Bowers from Another Level, Adam Rickitt, Kavana and Gareth Gates)

== Reception ==
=== Critical reception ===
After watching the first episode, which focused on the rises and falls of Five and Liberty X, Adam Postans of MSN said: "I'll be honest; I tuned in to this series opener to take the merciless mickey out of a bunch of pop has-been wannabes (come to think of it, 'Has-Been Wannabes' would have been a brilliant name for the losing quintet on the original ITV talent show, Popstars)...So I'm delighted and surprised to say that The Big Reunion wasn't the tiresome, drawn-out hour I'd assumed it would be..." Postans called it: "A surprisingly sober tale of the downfalls of being a pop star."

Of the second episode, which focused on the rises and falls of Atomic Kitten and 911, Caroline Frost of The Huffington Post said: "This week's 'The Big Reunion', bringing back together six girl-and boy bands for a one-off concert, concentrated on 911 and Atomic Kitten, which meant one thing - Kerry Katona-watch - but also a couple of harsh life lessons...This week's lessons - fame won't mend a broken heart, and success will challenge your friendships however robust they are, and turn the sweetest kitten into a clawing puss. And I still can’t wait for Bew*tched to unravel their demons. Roll on next week of this car-crash guilty pleasure. Loving every minute."

Of the third episode, which focused on the rises and falls of B*Witched and Honeyz, Frost said: "This week's 'Big Reunion' showed the strength – AND shortfalls – of girl power, and shared two more of life's harsh lessons along the way."

Grace Dent, writing for The Independent, reviewed The Big Reunion very positively: "Sometime back in January a small TV brain-fart named The Big Reunion appeared on the schedule. Real low-rent reality TV fodder. The sort of thing I lap up at home with my ankles raised, eating noodles, while you are possibly ironing your own face to stay alert during that new Poliakoff five-parter. I won, however, and hooray for me, because The Big Reunion has been bloody fantastic." Dent went on to state that, "I am truly thankful that we live in an era when washed-up stars can make TV comebacks." Rosie Gizauskas from NOW magazine said Five were the "most fascinating" band on the show. Likewise, The Guardian's Heidi Stephens called The Big Reunion "hugely compelling TV", while her colleague Priya Elan said that the programme's legacy "will probably not be a re-evaluation of the music; instead it serves as a modern music-industry morality tale. Essential viewing for any wannabe pop star".

=== Ratings ===
==== Series 1 ====
The first series was a huge ratings success for ITV2. The first episode was seen by an average of 957,000 UK viewers, though it peaked at 1.2 million, making it ITV2's highest rated premiere since Bionic Woman in 2008. The ratings increased for the second episode, which was watched by over 1.3 million, helping ITV2 finish third in the 9:00pm slot in front of BBC Two, Channel 4 and Channel 5. The overnight audience fell sharply to 670,000 for the third episode (but official figures were 941,000), being beaten in its timeslot by Junior Doctors: Your Life in Their Hands on BBC Three. Ratings continued to slide for episode 4, which overnight viewing figures showed was only watched by 630,000 viewers (less than half the audience of the episode of Celebrity Juice that followed at 10:00pm), although the official rating was 826,000. The sixth episode brought in 606,000 viewers when up against the series finale of Mayday on BBC One and UEFA Europa League coverage on ITV. 638,000 watched episode 7 and 593,000 watched episode 8. The ratings shot back up for the final episode, as an audience of 974,000 tuned in to watch the highlights and behind-the-scenes action of the Hammersmith Apollo concert. Official ratings show that with the addition of ITV2 +1, the series averaged over 1.2 million viewers every week.

==== The Big Reunion: On Tour ====
The Big Reunion: On Tour was seen by a relatively low audience compared to its original series. Just 197,000 viewers watched the first episode, whilst episode 2 saw figures dip to 191,000. The third and final episode was seen by an audience of 231,000.

==== Series 2 ====
The first episode of the second series was seen by an audience of 463,000, less than half the audience of the series 1 premiere.

== Awards and nominations ==
The Big Reunion received a record eight nominations at the 2013 National Reality Television Awards: five for the show itself (Most Inspiring TV Show 2013, Best Entertainment Show, Best Reality Non-Competition Show 2013, Best Self-Improvement/Makeover Show and Best Docu-Soap), one for six of the bands from the show (Best Music Act on a Reality TV Show), one for both Atomic Kitten's Liz McClarnon and Liberty X's Michelle Heaton (Celebrity Personality of the Year 2013), and one for Heaton (Best Female Personality 2013).

The show was also nominated for Best Reality and Constructed Factual Programme at the 2014 British Academy Television Awards.

Year	Award	Category	Result	Work	Ref.
2013	National Reality Television Awards	Most Inspiring TV Show 2013	Won	The Big Reunion	
2013	National Reality Television Awards	Best Entertainment Show	Nominated	The Big Reunion	
2013	National Reality Television Awards	Best Reality Non-Competition Show 2013	Nominated	The Big Reunion	
2013	National Reality Television Awards	Best Self-Improvement/Makeover Show	Nominated	The Big Reunion	
2013	National Reality Television Awards	Best Docu-Soap	Won	The Big Reunion	
2013	National Reality Television Awards	Best Music Act (on a Reality TV Show)	Won	Five	
2013	National Reality Television Awards	Best Music Act (on a Reality TV Show)	Nominated	Liberty X Honeyz; Blue; 911; Atomic Kitten	
2013	National Reality Television Awards	Celebrity Personality of the Year 2013	Nominated	Michelle Heaton; Liz McClarnon	
2013	National Reality Television Awards	Best Female Personality 2013	Nominated	Michelle Heaton	
2014	2014 British Academy Television Awards	Reality and Constructed Factual	Nominated	The Big Reunion	

== Concerts ==
=== 2013 ===
The bands were originally only supposed to perform a one-off concert at London's Hammersmith Apollo on 26 February 2013, but when the entire show sold out in under five minutes shortly after the premiere of the first episode on 31 January 2013, rumours circulated that the show may become a full arena tour around the UK. On 11 February, it was confirmed that, following high ticket demands and the popularity of The Big Reunion, a UK tour would be taking place from 3–14 May 2013. Irish and Northern Irish fans initially looked set to miss out until it was announced on 14 February that the bands would also be bringing the show to Dublin and Belfast on 16 and 17 May, respectively, bringing the tour to a total of 14 shows. The Hammersmith Apollo concert was released on DVD in April 2013.

On 27 March 2013, it was announced that the bands would perform a four-date "Christmas Party tour" in December 2013. Five, B*Witched, Atomic Kitten, 911, Honeyz and Liberty X all took part, but, due to their own tour commitments, Blue did not. Three more dates were then announced on 23 April 2013.

For a special Big Reunion "End of the show-show" segment on Ant & Dec's Saturday Night Takeaway on 23 March 2013, Five, Atomic Kitten and Blue all performed one song each, creating a medley. To coincide with the reunion, Ant & Dec themselves returned to their 1990s pop act PJ & Duncan for a performance of their song "Let's Get Ready to Rhumble", which reached number one on the UK Singles Chart the following week.

=== 2014 ===
The bands from series 2 performed their gig at the Hammersmith Apollo on 21 February 2014. On 20 March, it was announced that the boy bands from both series (Five, 911, Blue, A1, 3T, Damage and 5th Story) would go on The Big Reunion Boyband Tour in October 2014.

== Discography ==
=== Charity single ===
Five, 911, Atomic Kitten, B*Witched, Honeyz and Liberty X planned to join together as a supergroup to release a Christmas charity single in aid of ITV's fundraiser Text Santa, confirmed by ITV on 23 October 2013. The bands covered Wizzard's "I Wish It Could Be Christmas Everyday" to raise money for Age UK, Barnardo's, BeatBullying, the British Heart Foundation, CLIC Sargent and Help the Hospices. The song was released on 16 December 2013 and charted at number 21 the following week.

=== The Big Reunion – The Official Album ===
On 11 February 2014, it was announced that a two-disc Big Reunion compilation album would be released, featuring singles by bands from both series of the show. Disc 1 features the bands from the second series, whilst Disc 2 features the bands from the first series. The album was released through Universal Music on 28 February.

DISC 1

1. Damage – "Ghetto Romance"
2. Damage – "Wonderful Tonight"
3. Damage – "Forever"
4. Girl Thing – "Last One Standing"
5. Girl Thing – "Pure and Simple"
6. Girl Thing – "Girls on Top"
7. A1 – "Caught in the Middle"
8. A1 – "Take On Me"
9. A1 – "Same Old Brand New You"
10. Eternal – "Stay"
11. Eternal – "Power of a Woman"
12. Eternal – "I Wanna Be the Only One"
13. 5th Story – "I Breathe Again" (original Adam Rickitt)
14. 5th Story – "Spirit in the Sky" (original Gareth Gates)
15. 5th Story – "Freak Me" (original Another Level)
16. 5th Story – "I Can Make You Feel Good" (original Kavana)
17. 5th Story – "Crossroads" / "Flip Reverse" (original Blazin' Squad)
18. 3T – "I Need You"
19. 3T – "Anything"

DISC 2

1. 5ive – "Everybody Get Up"
2. Liberty X – "Being Nobody"
3. Liberty X – "Got to Have Your Love"
4. Liberty X – "Just a Little"
5. Atomic Kitten – "The Tide Is High (Get the Feeling)"
6. Atomic Kitten – "Right Now"
7. Atomic Kitten – "Whole Again"
8. 911 – "Bodyshakin'"
9. 911 – "A Little Bit More"
10. 911 – "More Than a Woman"
11. Honeyz – "Finally Found"
12. Honeyz – "Won't Take It Lying Down"
13. Honeyz – "End of the Line"
14. B*Witched – "C'est la Vie"
15. Blue – "All Rise"
16. Blue – "Sorry Seems to Be the Hardest Word"
17. Blue – "One Love"

== Sponsorship ==
The first series was sponsored by Crystalla, wristwear by Sekonda, whilst The Big Reunion: On Tour and The Big Christmas Reunion were sponsored by Seksy Intense Rose, also by Sekonda.

The second series was sponsored by Blinkbox Music.
