= Wonderland (Wonderland album) =

Studio album by Wonderland
- Released: 6 June 2011
- Recorded: 2009–2011
- Genres: Pop, country pop
- Length: 52.26
- Label: Mercury

Singles from Wonderland
- 1. "Not a Love Song" Released: 4 March 2011; 2. "Starlight" Released: 6 June 2011; 3. "Nothing Moves Me Anymore" Released: 14 August 2011; 4. "Need You Now" Released: 7 November 2011

Wonderland is the self-titled debut and only studio album by Irish girl group Wonderland.

The album debuted at number eight on the UK Albums Chart with sales of over 15,000 copies. While it peaked at number six on the Irish Album Chart. While it first entered at number ten on UK midweeks chart. The album was the highest charting debut album from a girl group in the UK since Girls Aloud in 2002 and tied with Pussycat Dolls' debut album PCD in 2005, until Little Mix's DNA entered at number 3 in November 2012.

== Background and development ==
They stated recording process in late 2009 after passing through the screening process in 2008. The recording process includes searching, writing and recording songs in a studio. Band manager Louis Walsh said that 30-60 potential tracks were about to be recorded by the band. Band member Kasey Smith added: "We recorded our album and searched out loads of amazing songs for it. We've spent time becoming a real band and touring with Westlife. So many amazing things have happened!". Title tracks floated co-written by the band members before the album release. It was later announced not included in the debut album. The title tracks are the following: "Air Brush", "Believe", "Getting Mad Not Even", "Girlfriend", and "Signs". In late 2010, Nine tracks have been recorded and Durran said that there are a couple more to finish. In an interview with Digital Spy, band member Jodi Albert said: "We're so proud of how this album is shaping up, because not only have we worked with some amazing songwriters, but we've been able to collaborate and co-write." Band member Leigh Learmont added: "There's not a single track that we don't love. There's none that we would consider filler." Wonderland have worked with Andy Hill, Shep Solomon and Bob Clearmountain on the tracks. The girls admitted they were surprised when they found out they would be working with high-profile producers on the album. Band member Sharon Condon admitted: "It's been a steep learning curve because most of us have only just started learning about songwriting and producers. Having said that, when we found out we were working with Andy Hill, who wrote Celine Dion's Think Twice, we all knew that was a big deal! "We've worked with Kelly Clarkson and Bryan Adams writers, Shep Solomon and Bob Clearmountain too - it's been incredible."

The album consists of overall fifteen tracks (only twelve tracks originally). There are three bonus tracks included on the iTunes version, they are "What Do You Want Me To Do" and their live acoustic covers of Adele's "Rolling in the Deep" and "Only Girl (In the World)" by Rihanna. It was later decided to include "Rolling in the Deep" on the standard track listing as a bonus track which makes it as thirteen. While iTunes have bonus tracks, Play.com have extra exclusive autographed poster, Amazon.co.uk have extra exclusive slipcase and HMV.co.uk have "Wonderland - Live in Jazz Cafe, London". The LP have ten originals (two was co-written by the band) and five covers. It was mixed with old and new, ballad and upbeat music. The two songs co-written by the band are "Not a Love Song" and "Time Has Run Out". Aside from Adele and Rihanna, they've also covered Lady Antebellum's "Need You Now", Alexis Strum's "It Could Be You" and Ryan Adams's "When the Stars Go Blue". When asked about the inclusion of some of their live covers they said: "We love 'Need You Now' and so does our label, so hopefully it's going on the album.", "'Need You Now' is the only cover on the album at the moment, but I think we're recording Ryan Adams's 'When The Stars Go Blue' too, which we all love. A good song is a good song, and if we all like it then we want to record it!"

Before the release, the live acoustic versions of "Nothing Moves Me Anymore", "Need You Now", and "Only Girl" were released as free downloads on their official Facebook site, performed live and some were released also in their debut EP Introduction to Wonderland. While "Is It Just Me", "Rolling in the Deep" and "In Your Arms" were performed live on their gigs with "Starlight" and "Not a Love Song" which became singles. Also, the snippets of each album track were posted through their official SoundCloud site before the album release. Band manager Walsh picked "Why Here Why Now" as his favorite track off the album. While "Emergency" was the iTunes UK Free Single of the Week (12–18 June 2011).

== Album name and artwork ==
In late 2010, they stated in Digital Spy they had not started thinking nor deciding on the album title. In early 2011, they announced the album title may be called "Wonderland" or "Welcome to Wonderland". It ended up being a self-titled album title. There are three versions of official album artworks. Firstly it was in a blue background with title Wonderland on the lower edge, secondly in a black background with title Wonderland on the upper side, thirdly in a black background with a different picture attached that was used for television advertisements of the album.

== Critical reception ==
Professional ratings
Review scores
Source	Rating
All Music	3/5 stars
Female First	5/5 stars
Financial Times	1/5 stars
Fincky	7/10 stars
New! Magazine	3/5 stars
OK! Magazine	3/5 stars
Stereoboard	7/10 stars
Teen First	5/5 stars
The Music Fix	4/10 stars
Virgin Media	1/5 stars

Mike Diver of BBC Music, said the album was "A solid debut of country-tinged ballads and zesty pop spoiled by an ill-advised cover". iheartmusic.co.uk expressed: The group, formed and managed by Louis Walsh alongside Westlife's Kian Egan, have spent longer perfecting their sound and style than most acts have deals for these days, (poor Mini Viva, Girls Can't Catch, Joe McElderry…). So the expected standard of their debut was always going to be high, especially with Louis and Kian's track record in the business. With the influx of girl groups in 2011 it's easy to try and compare them to others, but Wonderland have their own sound, they've perfected the blend of pop and country, with an added splash of rock. And with their five different, but impressively strong voices combining as one, each bringing a different layer to the track, the result is an impressive debut album. Whilst it is noticeable that the first half of the album contains the tracks that were first being performed a year ago, it is refreshing to see a label give an act time to find their feet, and not rush into releasing an album, that then gets padded out with mediocre covers and fillers, and hoping for the best.I can safely say it's surpassed all expectations I had, as you all know I judge albums by how many tracks I can get in to an album before I have the urge to skip a track, and Wonderland passes that test with flying colours. To save me repeating myself for every track I talk about, the vocals on this album are phenomenal. The arrangements are spot on, the emotion comes across in the ballads perfectly, and you would never think that this was the first album released by the group. It is an amazing collection of songs, which has the perfect balance of light and shade between ballads and more upbeat tracks. IndieLondon interpreted the album: "True, it's polished pop that sound-checks everything from Taylor Swift to The Corrs via a little Fleetwood Mac and even ABBA, but it's this mix of easy to identify styles, coupled with their telling ability to deliver a catchy melody, that makes the album better than most debuts from girl bands. Overall, then, we had more reason to be optimistic rather than glum about the emergence of yet another girl band."

== Release and promotion ==
The album was released 6 June 2011. On 8 May 2011, Dean Piper of The Mirror said that he's thrilled of amazing pre-sales of the album. This album was seen on top five of Play.com album pre-orders while top ten on Amazon and HMV album pre-orders.

=== Singles ===
- "Not a Love Song" is the first single released from the album. It was released on 25 February 2011 in Ireland and 4 March 2011 in the United Kingdom. The song debuted at number 22 on the Irish Singles Chart. IndieLondon said "it drops a definite country-pop twang over its chorus. But it works nonetheless."
- "Starlight" is the second single from the album. It was released 6 June 2011 in Ireland and United Kingdom. The song debuted at number 57 on the UK Singles Chart. Unreality Shout gave the single saying: "A more sophisticated effort. It recalls the sound of girl bands from the 90's, perhaps a little too much" Entertainment Focus added: "The track is similar in style to the band's debut single with each girl getting the opportunity to sing a few lines. A driving beat moves the song through the verses to a radio-friendly chorus whilst the girls showcases impressive vocal prowess. The end result is something more mature than Girls Aloud or The Saturdays and perhaps a little closer to The Corrs at their peak." Totally Vivid stated: "It starts slow and subtle before launching into a soaring, spacey chorus - properly epic in all sense of the word. The chorus of 'I wanna dance underneath your light, cos you pull me in like you're on my side. When I die in the day, I'm revived at night. Can I call you mine,' is just amazing; one of those real bliss on the dancefloor moments. And just at the end of the clip you can hear the beginnings of a dub-step breakdown. The mix just got even better. What I really love is that as dancey as this version is, it retains enough pop sensibility that it could just as easily be presented as the radio version of the track. In terms of the studio version, it's got a real drive to it and like Not A Love Song, really plays to the strengths of the girls' impressive harmonies. The music video was directed by Nigel Dick and was shot over three days (13–15 April 2011) around the Salton Sea area in Brawley, Glamis, Los Angeles, California, the production was a massive challenge for the director and his team – battling 35 degrees of dry heat and threatened by gales of 75mph… It sees the band embark on a Californian road trip in their 1970's Airstream RV. It premiered on both UK music channels and on YouTube in May 2011. iheartmusic described it "as a shiny new video, mainly different clips of the ladies having a laugh with each other and a bit of singing in between. I love the hilarious footage of them marching up, then rolling down, the sand dunes – also, don't ask Jodi if you can have some of her ice cream, she will splat you on the nose with it!" Same with "Not a Love Song", a remix bundle from 7th Heaven, Club Junkies, and now TM Cosmos and was publicly leaked but was not officially released.
- "Nothing Moves Me Anymore" is the third single from the album. It will be released 14 August 2011. Michael Turnbull, digital manager of Mercury Records said there will be a new edit for this song. Daily Record rated the single. IndieLondon said: "The obligatory ballad, Nothing Moves Me Anymore, is well delivered, if formulaic… with the aching vocals accompanied by yearning, meaningful lyrics and a soft acoustic background. Yet while it's working on a familiar formula, the vocals carry it through." Band member Sharon Condon stated that they will start shooting the music video on Monday, 20 June 2011. It will be directed by Alex Hemming. The video premiered on Monday 11 July 2011 (three days earlier in UK music channels). An exclusive web performance of the song was made by the band for STV in June 2011. Totally Vivid said: The Wonderland girls take on a far more solemn direction in the video for their latest single 'Nothing Moves Me Anymore' - Gone are the carefree tones of 'Starlight', replaced by a song wrapped up in that aching sense of loss that comes from the ruins of a broken relationship. Through the heart of this loss though, we have lots of shots of the girls in 'We're all in this together' poses - if everything's falling to pieces around them, they still remain together, defiant to the last. The single mix of the track has been given a few tweaks, a nice little bonus to fans - it serves to add to the big ballady feel of the whole package too. It might be the middle of summer right now, but if ever a song and accompanying video felt more suited to one of those Comic Relief/Children In Need moments, it's this one. My favourite bit of the video has to be the carefully poised shot of someone using the 'Delete Photo' button on their iPhone to prime effect - never before has modern mobile phone technology been so dramatic! In another key scene, two members of the camera crew filming the whole video bump into each other, prompting giggles from two of the girls - we imagine this accidental nudge leads to a whirlwind romance and eventually marriage; a romantic tonic to the previous 'Delete Photo' scene. It's all rather lovely, charming stuff and the Wonderland girls carry it off well. Orange UK said: an emotional ballad which really shows off the girls' amazing voices. With lines like 'I've never felt this empty before' and 'If someones asks me, I say I'm doing fine', we can all relate to the pain of a broken relationship.
- "Need You Now" is expected to be the fourth single to be released 6 November 2011. Female First quoted that it show more depth and maturity that most girl bands would do, with lyrics that don't seem geared to pre-teen girls. The line "It's quarter after one, I'm a little drunk and I need you now" isn't particularly thought-provoking, but it's an unexpected sentiment for a usually polished and perfect genre of music with a very specific market. Wonderland more than do it justice here, and credit has to go to whoever chose this song", "slick cover" added by Star Magazine. BBC Music identified it as a commendable cover of Lady Antebellum's Grammy-winning hit, is one such offering – admittedly impressively widescreen of scope, it's nevertheless a very rudimentary exercise lyrically, all "oh woe is me for being lonely" and "crikey, it'd be so much better if I had a fella" (to paraphrase somewhat). An unplugged version of the song was released in 2010 before the studio version released. Another version, the live acoustic, was heard on their Introduction to Wonderland EP released in March 2011. It was later seen as a video released in June 2011.

== Track listing ==
Standard listing
No.	Title	Writer(s)	Producer(s)	Length
1.	"Not a Love Song"	Jodi Albert, Adam Argyle, Sharon Condon, Corrina Durran, Leigh Learmont, Kasey Smith, Sheppard Solomon	Eliot James	3:25
2.	"Starlight"	Ben Harrison, Virginia McGrail, Rachel Moulden, James Murray, Mustafa Omer	Mojam Music	3.32
3.	"Nothing Moves Me Anymore"	Marcus Killian, Michael Logan, Blair Mackichan, Gabriela Soza	Steve Power	3:46
4.	"Need You Now"	Dave Haywood, Josh Kear, Charles Kelley, Hillary Scott	Power, Steve Robson	3:48
5.	"In Your Arms"	Jamie Norton, Mark Owen, Benjamin Weaver	Norton, Power, Weaver	3:45
6.	"Is It Just Me"	Adam Argyle, Denise Adam	Power	3:54
7.	"Why Here Why Now"	Andy Hill, Shelly Poole	Hill	4:02
8.	"Time Has Run Out"	Albert, Condon, Durran, Learmont, Jay Bauer Mein, Nexus, Smith, David Sneddon	Power	3:46
9.	"Emergency"	Norton, Owen, Weaver	Norton, Power, Weaver	3:45
10.	"It Could Be You"	Alexis Strum, Billy Steinberg, Paul Inder	Robson	3:24
11.	"Get Your Boots On"	Sarah Howells, Charlie Grant, Richard Llewellyn, Pete Woodroffe	James	3:09
12.	"When the Stars Go Blue"	Ryan Adams	Power	4:14
Total length:				52:26

Standard bonus track
No.	Title	Writer(s)	Length
13.	"Rolling in the Deep"	Adele Adkins, Paul Epworth	3:34

iTunes bonus tracks
No.	Title	Writer(s)	Producer(s)	Length
14.	"What Do You Want Me To Do"	Richard Buckton, Sinead O'Carroll, Woodroffe	James	3:19
15.	"Rolling In the Deep"	Adele, Epworth		3:34
16.	"Only Girl (In The World)"	Mikkel S. Eriksen, Tor Erik Hermansen, Crystal Johnson, Sandy Vee		3:47

=== Other credits ===
Not A Love Song

- Mixed by – Bob Clearmountain
- Drums, percussion – Tal Amiran
- Acoustic guitar, electric guitar, bass guitar, piano, synthesizer – Eliot James
- Arranged by [strings] – Stephen Hussey
- Engineer [assistant recording] – George Apsion, Samuel Navel, Tariq Al-Nasrawi

Starlight

- Mixed by – Bob Clearmountain
- Guitar – Ben Harrison
- Engineer [additional] – James Murray, Mustafa Omer
- Other [all other instruments] – James Murray, Mustafa Omer
- Arranged by [strings] – Luke Juby
- Engineer – Graham Dickenson

Nothing Moves Me Anymore

- Drums – Jeremy Stacey
- Acoustic guitar – Phil Palmer
- Programmed by – Rohan Onraet, Steve Power
- Percussion – Rohan Onraet
- Arranged by [strings] – Nick Ingman
- Mixed by – Steve Power
- Bass guitar, electric guitar, acoustic guitar – Tim Van der Kuil
- Engineer – Rohan Onraet

Need You Now

- Piano, bass, programmed by [keyboards] – Steve Robson
- Mixed by – Steve Power
- Arranged by [strings] – Will Malone
- Programmed by Pro Tools – Rohan Onraet, Sam Miller, Steve Power
- Guitar – Luke Potashnick
- Drums – Karl Brazil
- Engineer – Rohan Onraet, Sam Miller

In Your Arms

- Mixed by – Steve Power
- Programmed by [Pro Tools] – Rohan Onraet, Steve Power
- Drums – Jeremy Stacey
- Bass guitar, electric guitar, acoustic guitar – Tim Van der Kuil
- Engineer – Rohan Onraet

Is It Just Me

- Arranged by [strings] – Nick Ingram
- Programmed by [Pro Tools] – Rohan Onraet, Steve Power
- Acoustic guitar, electric guitar, bass guitar – Tim Van der Kuil
- Piano, keyboards – Dave Arch
- Drums – Jeremy Stacey
- Mixed by – Steve Power
- Engineer – Rohan Onraet

Why Here Why Now

- Mixed by – Bob Clearmountain
- Other [all instruments] – Andy Hill

Time Has Run Out

- Drums – Jeremy Stacey
- Programmed by – Rohan Onraet, Steve Power
- Percussion – Rohan Onraet
- Arranged by [strings] – Nick Ingman
- Mixed by – Steve Power
- Bass guitar, electric guitar, acoustic guitar – Tim Van der Kuil
- Engineer – Rohan Onraet

Emergency

- Programmed by – Rohan Onraet, Steve Power
- Mixed by – Steve Power
- Drums – Jeremy Stacey
- Bass guitar, electric guitar, acoustic guitar – Tim Van der Kuil
- Engineer – Rohan Onraet

It Could Be You

- Mixed by – Steve Power
- Acoustic guitar – Luke Potashnik
- Programmed by – Steve Robson
- Bass guitar – Malcolm Moore
- Fiddle – Steve Robson
- Drums – Karl Brazil
- Piano – Steve Robson

Get Your Boots On

- Mixed by – James Lewis
- Engineer [assistant] – George Apsion, Samuel Navel, Tariq Al-Nasrawi
- Drums, percussion – Tal Amiran
- Acoustic guitar, electric guitar, bass guitar, piano, synthesizer – Eliot James
- Arranged by [strings] – Stephen Hussey

When the Stars Go Blue

- Drums – Karl Brazil
- Programmed by – Rohan Onraet, Steve Power
- Programmed by [keyboards] – Rohan Onraet
- Percussion – Rohan Onraet
- Fiddle – Dermot Crehan
- Arranged by [strings] – Nick Ingman
- Mixed by – Steve Power
- Bass guitar, electric guitar, acoustic guitar – Tim Van der Kuil
- Engineer – Rohan Onraet

Rolling in the Deep

- Mixed by – James Lewis
- Guitar – Wayne Plummer
- Percussion – Gareth Brown
- Engineer – Matt Foster

== Chart performance ==
Chart (2011)	Peak position
Irish Albums (IRMA)	6
Scottish Albums (Official Charts Company)	7
UK Albums (Official Charts Company)	8
UK Physical Albums (OCC)	9
UK Download Albums (OCC)	7

== Release history ==
Region	Date	Format	Label
United Kingdom	June 6, 2011	Digital download	Mercury Records
Ireland	June 10, 2011	Digital download	Mercury Records
