= Celebrity Big Brother (British TV series) series 3 =

Coordinates: 51°39′23″N 0°16′02″W

Celebrity Big Brother
- Series 3
- Series three logo
- Presented by: Davina McCall
- No. of days: 18
- No. of housemates: 9
- Winner: Bez
- Runner-up: Kenzie
- Companion shows: Big Brother's Little Brother; Big Brother's Efourum; Big Brother Live; Diary Room Uncut; Nominations Uncut
- No. of episodes: 18

Release
- Original network: Channel 4
- Original release: 6 January – 23 January 2005

Series chronology
- ← Previous; Series 2 Next → Series 4

Celebrity Big Brother 2005, also known as Celebrity Big Brother 3, is the third series of the British reality television series Celebrity Big Brother. It launched on 6 January 2005 and ended on 23 January 2005, airing on Channel 4. Davina McCall returned as host of the main show. The series continued with Big Brother 5's 'evil' theme. It was won by dancer Mark "Bez" Berry.

This was the first series of Celebrity Big Brother to air since 2002, as Teen Big Brother: The Experiment and Big Brother Panto were broadcast in its place in 2003 and 2004, respectively. This was also the first series where the celebrities were being paid for their appearance rather than doing it for charity like the previous two series, however a percentage of phone vote funds went towards helping victims of the 2004 Indian Ocean earthquake and tsunami.

John McCririck, who was the second housemate to be evicted, represented this series in Ultimate Big Brother in 2010, where he was the first to be evicted.

== Format ==
Celebrity Big Brother is a game show in which a group of celebrity contestants, referred to as housemates, live in isolation from the outside world in a custom built "house", constantly under video surveillance. During their time in the House, the housemates are required to nominate two of their fellow contestants for potential eviction, and the two or more with the most votes would be nominated. This process is mandatory for all housemates, and failure to comply could result in expulsion from the House. The public then vote, with one of those celebrities evicted from the house. When the final week arrives, the viewers vote for which of the remaining celebrities should win the series, and the housemate with the most votes becomes the winner.

During their time in the House, housemates are given weekly tasks to perform. The housemates wager a portion of their weekly shopping budget on the task, and either win double their wagered fund or lose the wagered fund depending on their performance in the task. The housemates are required to work as a group to complete their tasks, with the format of the tasks varying based on the number of remaining housemates. Throughout the series, some housemates have been given secret tasks that must either be completed individually or with a small group; failure to do so can result in the housemate being nominated or punished in the House. Should the housemates run out of the food provided for them, an emergency ration was available to them. The housemates are forbidden from discussing nominations, and doing so could result in punishment. The format of the series is mainly seen as a social experiment, and requires housemates to interact with others who may have differing ideals, beliefs, and prejudices. Housemates are also required to make visits to the Diary Room during their stay in the House, where they are able to share their thoughts and feelings on their fellow housemates and the game.

== Housemates ==
Celebrity	Age on entry	Notability	Day entered	Day exited	Result
Bez	40	Dancer and percussionist	1	18	Winner
Kenzie	19	Rapper	1	18	Runner-up
Brigitte Nielsen	41	Actress and model	1	18	3rd place
Jeremy Edwards	33	Actor	1	16	Evicted
Caprice	33	Model and actress	1	16	Evicted
Lisa I'Anson	39	Presenter	1	14	Evicted
John McCririck	64	Horse racing pundit	1	12	Evicted
Jackie Stallone	83	Wrestling promoter	5	9	Evicted
Germaine Greer	65	Feminist, academic and journalist	1	6	Walked

=== Bez ===
Mark "Bez" Berry (born 18 April 1964) is a British dancer and percussionist formerly of the alternative rock band Happy Mondays, who was fourth to enter the house on Day 1. Whilst in the house, he struck up close bonds with Brigitte and Jeremy. Also during the shows run, Bez became restless and claimed he wanted to "jump over the wall". On Day 18, Bez left the house as winner with 54% of the public vote, beating Brigitte and Kenzie.

At the time of entering the house, Bez was formally bankrupt at the time under his real name. After winning the £50,000 prize money, he used some of it to improve the engine of his London black cab. The UK edition of car TV show, Pimp My Ride later 'pimped' it out for him which included painting it purple and installing a DVD player. In March 2008, he declared bankruptcy for the second time. His chosen charity was the DEC Tsunami Earthquake Appeal.

=== Brigitte Nielsen ===
Brigitte Nielsen (born 15 July 1963) is a Danish actress, who entered the house last on Day 1. She was once married to Sylvester Stallone. During her time in the house, she became close to Lisa and Caprice. She was known for her use of her catchphrase "diggity". On Day 5, Jackie Stallone, Brigitte's former mother-in-law, entered the house. Before entering the house, Jackie and Brigitte engaged in a very public feud when the American tabloids reported that Jackie was against her son's relationship with Nielson and that Brigitte blamed Jackie for the divorce. Brigitte was visibly upset by the situation and requested to leave. However, whilst in the house, Brigitte and Jackie mended their relationship. When in the house, Brigitte had an argument with John which started when he said that she was "ugly" because of her short hair. In 2008, she stated that her opinion on him had not changed and branded him "foul" and "disgusting". On Day 18, Brigitte left the house in third place, behind Kenzie and Bez. In July 2008, she appeared on Big Brother's Little Brother, discussing the current housemates. In her interview with presenter George Lamb, she stated that she and Jackie are still on good terms and still contact each other from time to time. Her chosen charity was Task Brasil Trust.

=== Caprice ===
Caprice Bourret (or simply Caprice) (born 24 October 1971) is an American model, who was third to enter the house on Day 1. When in the house, she became friendly with Lisa and Brigitte. On Day 9, she was given a secret mission by Big Brother. This resulted in her finding a secret room with a television and a VT of her fellow housemates speaking about her in the Diary Room. This included a clip of John comparing her to a "cash machine" and implying that everything she did in the house was for money and to promote her lingerie collection. She later confronted him about this which resulted in them having an argument. Caprice was fourth to be evicted on Day 16 with only 5% of the vote to win. She was originally approached to take part in Celebrity Big Brother 2, but had to pull out at the last minute. The charity which she was supporting was Childline.

=== Germaine Greer ===
Germaine Greer (born 29 January 1939) is an Australian journalist and feminist. She was second to enter the house on Day 1. Prior to entering the house, she had criticised the show claiming it was "as civilised as looking through the keyhole in your teenager's bedroom door". While in the house she tried (in vain) to stage a protest against Big Brother. On Day 6, Germaine left the house first and became the first ever celebrity housemate to walk. Germaine voluntarily left the house stating bullying of Brigitte by the show's producers and the behaviour of her fellow housemates towards John as reasons.

=== Jackie Stallone ===
Jackie Stallone (29 November 1921 - 21 September 2020) was an American astrologer and mother to film actor Sylvester Stallone. She entered the house on Day 5, as part of the Mediaeval Task, in which she was referred to as "the Queen mother". She is remembered for her first words to Brigitte upon entering the house, "Yeah, Brackie". She is also former mother-in-law to fellow housemate Brigitte. Her entering upset Brigitte greatly and resulted in Brigitte requesting to leave. However, in the house, they resolved their issues with each other. She was the cause of much conflict between her fellow housemates particularly with Lisa who likened her to the Bride of Frankenstein and told her she hoped that she choked on her eggs. She also had many confrontations with John who branded her "lazy". Her lack of day-to-day knowledge was much to the entertainment of her fellow housemates such as her not being able to open a bottle of wine or make tea. Jackie said that this was down to the fact that she had employees to do these things for her in the outside. After only just four days in the house, she was first to be evicted on Day 9, losing out to John, with 33% of the vote to save. She is the oldest housemate to ever enter the house in the UK, until 10 series later, when Lionel Blair entered the house at age 85.

=== Jeremy Edwards ===
Jeremy Edwards (born 17 February 1971) is an English actor. He entered the house sixth on Day 1. During his time in the house, he struck up a close bond with Kenzie. The pair were known to play pranks on their fellow housemates such as locking up John's Diet Coke, which he had sought after for days, much to John's outrage. He was accused of bullying Jackie when in the house and was heavily criticized by the media and interrogated by the show's presenter, Davina McCall, for jumping up and down with joy the moment her eviction was announced. Jeremy was fifth to be evicted from the house in a double eviction on Day 16.

=== John McCririck ===
John McCririck (17 April 1940 – 5 July 2019) was a pundit for Channel 4 racing, he is best remembered by Big Brother fans for his protest over not receiving Diet Coke. John was first to enter the house on Day 1 and was second to be evicted on Day 12, and despite claiming to have never watched Big Brother before, he became a fan and regularly appeared on Big Brother's Little Brother, Big Brother's Big Mouth and, most recently, Big Brother's Bit on the Side. He and his wife, whom he calls Booby, presented Big Mouth for a week in July 2007, he also appeared as a hijacker on Big Brother: Celebrity Hijack in January 2008. In 2010, he entered the house for a second time to take part in Ultimate Big Brother, where he became the first housemate to be evicted. In 2015, as part of Big Brother 16's latest Timebomb twist, John returned to the house as a guest at Hotel BB. He entered and departed with Big Brother 8's Charley Uchea. He also made an appearance on Celebrity Big Brother 19.

=== Kenzie ===
Kenzie (born 6 January 1986) is an MC and rapper, best known for being a member of Blazin' Squad and Friday Hill. He entered the house seventh on his 19th birthday, he was tipped to win Celebrity Big Brother, but finished in second place, he has also appeared in other reality shows including CelebAir.

=== Lisa I'Anson ===
Lisa I'Anson (born 31 May 1965) is a former Radio 1 DJ and Top of the Pops presenter. Lisa entered the house fifth on Day 1. She was also accused of bullying Jackie and was heavily criticised by the media and viewers. She was third to be evicted in a surprise eviction on Day 14 via the Diary Room, she was dressed as Little Bo-Peep and her housemates were unaware that she had been secretly evicted, she was booed heavily by the crowd on her exit.

== Summary ==
Eight housemates entered on Launch Night, it was Kenzie's 19th birthday and he was given a party by Big Brother. After McCririck did not receive Diet Coke, he went on a silent protest. Their first weekly task was a renaissance task where I'Anson was Queen, on Day 5, Stallone entered the house as the Queen Mother. Stallone was Neilson's ex mother in law, Greer who felt Big Brother was bullying housemates quit on Day 6, becoming the first celebrity housemate to leave voluntarily. On Day 7, McCririck and Stallone were nominated for eviction. Caprice discovered a secret room on Day 9, where she could watch what the housemates said about her in the Diary Room, this resulted in an argument between her and McCririck. Stallone was evicted on Day 9. Nominations took place again on Day 10, with Bez and McCririck facing eviction, McCririck was evicted on Day 12. Voting lines for the winner opened after McCririck's eviction, with the housemate with the fewest votes being evicted on Day 14. Big Brother asked the housemates to nominate on Day 14, these nominations were in vain, as the public were already voting, I'Anson received the fewest votes to win and during a children's party where housemates dressed as children's characters and played a game of hide and go seek, I'Anson dressed as Little Bo Peep was called to the Diary Room and told she was evicted and unable to say goodbye to the others. Caprice was evicted two days later on Day 16, as part of a double eviction, Edwards was evicted shortly after her. On the final Day, Neilson finished in third place, Kenzie in second place and Bez as the winner.

== Nominations table ==
	Day 7	Day 10	Day 14	Day 18 Final		Nominations received
Bez	Jackie, John	Brigitte, Kenzie	Jeremy, Lisa	Winner (Day 18)		11
Kenzie	John, Jackie	John, Bez	Bez, Brigitte	Runner-up (Day 18)		2
Brigitte	John, Jackie	John, Bez	Bez, Caprice	Third place (Day 18)		6
Jeremy	Jackie, Lisa	Bez, Brigitte	Brigitte, Caprice	Evicted (Day 16)		3
Caprice	John, Jackie	Bez, John	Bez, Brigitte	Evicted (Day 16)		3
Lisa	John, Jackie	John, Bez	Bez, Kenzie	Evicted (Day 14)		2
John	Bez, Caprice	Brigitte, Jeremy	Evicted (Day 12)			9
Jackie	Bez, Jeremy	Evicted (Day 9)				6
Germaine	Walked (Day 6)					N/A
Notes	1	none	2	3		
Against public vote	Jackie, John	Bez, John	Bez, Brigitte, Caprice, Jeremy, Kenzie, Lisa			
Walked	Germaine	none				
Evicted	Jackie; 33% to save	John; 39% to save	None	Lisa; 3% (out of 6)	Brigitte; 28% (out of 3)	
Evicted	Jackie; 33% to save	John; 39% to save	None	Caprice; 5% (out of 5)	Brigitte; 28% (out of 3)	
Evicted	Jackie; 33% to save	John; 39% to save	None	Caprice; 5% (out of 5)	Kenzie; 46% (out of 2)	
Evicted	Jackie; 33% to save	John; 39% to save	None	Jeremy; 12% (out of 4)	Kenzie; 46% (out of 2)	
Evicted	Jackie; 33% to save	John; 39% to save	None	Bez; 54% to win		

Notes

- ^Note 1: Jackie, as a new housemate, was originally allowed to nominate, but not allowed to be nominated. However, due to Germaine's departure, Jackie became eligible to both nominate and be nominated.
- ^Note 2: Housemates nominated for the third time - in fake nominations. Whilst the housemates nominated, the public were voting for who they wanted to win. Lisa was evicted later that night, and two days after, there was a double eviction, evicting Caprice and Jeremy. Without the twist, Bez and Brigitte would have faced the public vote.
- ^Note 3: The public were voting for the housemate they wanted to win rather than to save.

== Production ==
=== Eye logo ===
The shape of the Big Brother eye did not change from Big Brother 5. However, the colour of the eye changed from black to red and the pupil was replaced with a star.

=== Broadcasts ===
The live launch, nightly highlight shows, live eviction and finale were all broadcast on Channel 4. Davina McCall remained host of the live shows. Big Brother's Little Brother returned for the celebrity series once again hosted by Dermot O'Leary, for the first time ever it was broadcast in a late night time-slot on Channel 4, however it was broadcast in its usual Sunday lunchtime slot. On E4, live coverage from the house dominated its daily and nightly schedule, Nominations Uncut and Diary Room Uncut – which were both introduced during Big Brother 5 also returned to E4, as well as Big Brother's EFourum hosted by Russell Brand.

=== Sponsor ===
The show's sponsor this year was TalkTalk who had also sponsored Big Brother 5.

=== Theme ===
Due to the success of EVIL Big Brother, as seen during the fifth non-celebrity series, the theme continued throughout the celebrity series.

=== Prize money ===
This was the first celebrity series to include prize money, Bez won £50,000 on Day 18.

== Title sequence ==
The titles for this series are nearly identical to Big Brother 5, but with a brown background, red iris, and a pupil.

== House ==
The series was filmed in a custom-built house at Elstree Studios, where the series had been broadcasting since Big Brother 3 in 2002. The house remained largely unchanged since Big Brother 5, however, there were several modifications.

There was one change in the Diary Room; the wall panels changed to red and black, instead of blue. Everything else in the Diary Room, living room and kitchen remained unchanged. The garden had the most notable modifications. The grass had been covered with AstroTurf. The hot tub remained, but the outside shower and baths from Big Brother 5 were replaced with a heated seating area and the treatment room was replaced with a sauna. The bathroom and mixed bedroom remained, however, an additional bedroom for one with a double bed was built.

== Viewership ==
Celebrity Big Brother's launch show (aired on 6 January 2005) averaged 5.2 million viewers, and ratings fell to 2.9m by 8 January. By the end of Week 1, the show was attracting an average audience of around 4.2 million viewers. The episode aired on 18 January (the day after John's eviction night, which pulled in 4.3 million viewers) shed 700,000 viewers, attracting an audience of 3.5 million viewers. However, ratings arose the following night on Lisa's eviction night to an average of 4.9 million viewers. The live final (aired on 23 January 2005) which saw Bez crowned the winner pulled in an average audience of 5.4 million viewers, whilst an overall average audience of 4.1 million viewers watched this series.

	Week 1		Week 2	Week 3
Saturday		3.02	3.69	3.01
Sunday		3.68	4.2	5.67
Monday		4.41	4.27	
Tuesday		4.39	3.47	
Wednesday		4.53	4.85	
Thursday	5.41	4.49	4.09	
Friday	3.53	4.54	4.75	
Weekly average	4.22		4.19	4.34
Running average	4.22		4.21	4.22
Series average	4.22			
blue-coloured boxes denote live shows.
