= Will You Wait for Me? =

1999 single by Kavana

Single by Kavana

from the album Instinct
- B-side: "Him or Me"
- Released: 8 March 1999
- Length: 3:48
- Label: Virgin
- Songwriters: Kavana; Andy Watkins; Paul Wilson
- Producer: Absolute

Kavana singles chronology
"Funky Love" (1998)	"Will You Wait for Me?" (1999)	"Any Other Way" (2009)

"Will You Wait for Me?" is a song by British singer-songwriter Kavana. The ballad was released on 8 March 1999 as the third single from his second album, Instinct (1998). The song peaked at number 29 on the UK Singles Chart and at number 22 on the New Zealand Singles Chart. The track is one of Kavana's personal favourites in his repertoire.

== Background and release ==
"Will You Wait for Me?" was recorded during mid-1998 and was released as a single on 8 March 1999. It is Kavana's favourite song on the second album. He said in an interview, "This song is one of my favourites on the album (Instinct), actually – I've never done a ballad before! It's about a friend of mine who died of cancer, and writing it was great therapy in a way. Hopefully, this is the defining one for me." It was produced by Absolute.

== Track listings ==
UK CD1 and cassette single; Australian CD single

1. "Will You Wait for Me" – 3:48
2. "Will You Wait for Me" (Eric Kupper's S-Boy radio mix) – 4:13
3. "Him or Me" – 3:38

UK CD2

1. "Will You Wait for Me" (mixed by Mark "Spike" Stent) – 3:48
2. "Will You Wait for Me" (Eric Kupper's S-Boy radio mix) – 4:13
3. "Will You Wait for Me" (Doolally vocal mix) – 6:07
4. "Will You Wait for Me" (Shanks & Bigfoot remix)

== Charts ==
Chart (1999)	Peak position
Australia (ARIA)	65
New Zealand (Recorded Music NZ)	22
Scotland Singles (Official Charts)	34
UK Singles (Official Charts)	29
