= Special Kind of Something =

1998 single by Kavana

- UK CD1 artwork

Single by Kavana

from the album Instinct
- B-side: "Is That You?"
- Released: 17 August 1998
- Length: 3:32
- Label: Virgin
- Songwriters: Kavana; Watkins; Wilson
- Producer: Absolute

Kavana singles chronology
"Crazy Chance '97" (1997)	"Special Kind of Something" (1998)	"Funky Love" (1998)

"Special Kind of Something" is a song by British singer-songwriter Kavana. The song was released in August 1998 as the lead single from his second album, Instinct (1998). The song peaked at number 13 on the UK Singles Chart.

== Track listings ==
UK CD1, cassette and Australian CD single

1. "Special Kind of Something" (radio edit) – 3:32
2. "Special Kind of Something" (acoustic) – 3:32
3. "Is That You?" – 3:48

UK CD2

1. "Special Kind of Something" (radio edit) – 3:32
2. "Special Kind of Something" (K Gee Master) – 4:27
3. "Special Kind of Something" (K Gee's Planet Bounce Mix) – 4:23

== Charts ==
Chart (1998)	Peak position
Australia (ARIA)	83
Europe (Eurochart Hot 100)	70
UK Singles (Official Charts)	13

== Cover versions ==
The song was covered by British Pop group S Club and appears as a B-Side to their single Say Goodbye / Love Ain't Gonna Wait for You released in 2003.
