= Funky Love (Kavana song) =

1998 single by Kavana

- Australian artwork

Single by Kavana

from the album Instinct
- B-side: "Isn't Love Insane"
- Released: 30 November 1998
- Length: 3:36
- Label: Virgin
- Songwriters: Kavana; Andy Watkins; Paul Wilson
- Producer: Absolute

Kavana singles chronology
"Special Kind of Something" (1998)	"Funky Love" (1998)	"Will You Wait for Me?" (1999)

"Funky Love" is a song by British singer-songwriter Kavana. The song was released in November 1998 as the second single from his second album, Instinct (1998). The song peaked at number 32 on the UK Singles Chart.

== Track listings ==
UK CD1 and Australian CD single

1. "Funky Love" (radio edit) – 3:36
2. "Isn't Love Insane" – 4:15
3. "Funky Love" (Spreadlove Deep Vocal mix) – 6:30

UK CD2

1. "Funky Love" (radio edit) – 3:36
2. "Funky Love" (Trouser Enthusiasts Pentagram Deathtrap mix) – 8:04
3. "Funky Love" (Mash Up Matt Remix (Faded)) – 7:58

== Charts ==
Chart (1998–1999)	Peak position
Australia (ARIA)	91
UK Singles (Official Charts)	32
