= Introduction to Wonderland =

EP by Wonderland
- Released: 4 March 2011
- Recorded: 2010
- Label: Mercury

Introduction to Wonderland is the debut EP by Wonderland. It was released 4 March 2011, only on iTunes. It features the band's debut single "Not a Love Song". According to Music Week, the album has sold 25,000 copies in the UK since the release.

== Background ==
Sophie Monk of Stereoboard.com also reviewed the EP, "Well this is a strange review for me to be writing. I don't usually dedicate my time to listen to new, stereotypical girl bands who I just happened to hear on the radio late one night. But I decided I'd do something a bit different, and I'm actually very much glad that I did. 'Not a love song' is your typical, harmonious, cutesy love song about a complicated relationship, etc, etc. But what's different about this one from most other current girl band releases, such as The Saturdays "Higher" or Parade's "Louder", is that this one actually sounds genuinely well made and... not auto tuned! In this track you will find no annoying, screechy, electronic noises which accompany the so-obviously edited vocals, no embarrassingly awful lyrics, and what's more, the girls actually harmonize, which I would have thought was the whole point of a 'girl band.' But enough with the comparing... these five Irish girls deserve all of the listens and mentions that they can get. I would gladly sit here and listen to their lovely 'Nothing Moves Me' all night. On first listen, yes, it might sound like a dreary, boring, break up song which you'd probably rather not hear on a cold, dark, British 'Spring' night, but you cannot deny that these girls have got amazing voices, and that they know how to make a good, raw, acoustic number. The five Irish stars were introduced back in 2008 by Irish X Factor judge Louis Walsh and Westlife singer Kian Egan, when they held auditions for a new band which they would both co-manage. And from then on, the girls have been touring and promoting the songs from their EP, which was only released on the 4th March. These songs being; their first ever single 'Not a Love Song', 'Not a Love Song (acoustic)', a beautiful acoustic cover of Lady Antebellum's 'Need You Now' and the hauntingly honest 'Nothing Moves Me', which is also a beautiful acoustic track. Although this EP is quite calm, slow, maybe even mellow... I'm expecting some more upbeat, lively tunes from these girls once their self titled debut album 'Wonderland' is released on the 6th June of this year. I'm not a usual fan of these kind of stereotypical, skinny, gorgeous, some-what talented girl bands (because of the reasons I have just mentioned)... but I'm already a huge fan of 'Wonderland', so you know that they must be worth a listen!"

== Title and artwork ==
The original title of the EP had been decided to be Not a Love Song, but in February 2011 it was changed to Introduction to Wonderland. The artwork for the EP is the same as the artwork for the single "Not a Love Song".

== Track listing ==
No.	Title	Writer(s)	Producer(s)	Length
1.	"Not a Love Song"	Jodi Albert, Adam Argyle, Sharon Condon, Corrina Durran, Leigh Learmont, Kasey Smith, Shep Solomon	Eliot James	3:25
2.	"Not a Love Song (Live Acoustic)"	Albert, Argyle, Condon, Durran, Learmont, Smith, Solomon	James	3:42
3.	"Need You Now (Live Acoustic)"	Dave Haywood, Josh Kear, Charles Kelley, Hillary Scott	James	4:11
4.	"Nothing Moves Me Anymore (Live Acoustic)"	Marcus Killian, Michael Logan, Blair Mackichan, Gabriela Soza	James	3:32
5.	"Not a Love Song (Music Video)"	Albert, Argyle, Condon, Durran, Learmont, Smith, Solomon	James	3:31
