= Kavana (album) =

Studio album by Kavana
- Released: 28 April 1997
- Recorded: 1996–97
- Genre: Pop
- Length: 52:23
- Labels: Nemesis, Virgin
- Producers: Ian Green ~ Eliot Kennedy ~ Cutfather & Joe ~ Absolute ~ Don-E ~ Phil Chill ~ Phil Harding ~ Ian Curnow ~ Dave Lee ~ John O'Donnell

Kavana chronology
| Kavana (1997) | Instinct (1999) |

Singles from Kavana
- 1. "Crazy Chance" Released: 29 April 1996; 2. "Where Are You" Released: 12 August 1996; 3. "I Can Make You Feel Good" Released: 30 December 1996; 4. "MFEO" Released: 7 April 1997

Kavana is the debut studio album by British singer-songwriter Kavana. Kavana was discovered by Take That's manager Nigel Martin-Smith, and was subsequently signed to his label in early 1996. The album was recorded throughout 1996 and the beginning of 1997, being released the week following the album's fourth single, "MFEO". Kavana worked with many big name stars on the album, including Lulu ("Protected", who also provides backing vocals for the track) and Howard Donald ("Crazy Chance"). The album was released on 11 April 1997 to good critical reception, however only reached #29 on the UK Albums Chart. Subsequently, second pressing copies of the album have a "Reduced Price" logo printed on the booklet and were retailed shortly before the release of "Crazy Chance '97". However, again these failed to increase the album's chart position. Both "I Can Make You Feel Good" and "MFEO" became UK Top 10 hits, both peaking at #8 respectively.

== Singles ==
- "Crazy Chance" was released as the lead single from the album. The track peaked at #35 on the UK Singles Chart.
- "Where Are You" was released as the second single from the album. The track peaked at #26 on the UK Singles Chart. Additional tracks on the single release include; "Where Are You" (7" radio version), "For the Very First Time" (instrumental version), "Crazy Chance" (brand new mix), "For the Very First Time" (full version), "Where Are You" (live version).
- "I Can Make You Feel Good" was released as the third single from the album. The track peaked at #8 on the UK Singles Chart.
- "MFEO" was released as the fourth single from the album. The track peaked at #8 on the UK Singles Chart. Additional tracks on the single release include; "MFEO" (Cutfather & Joe 7" version), "MFEO" (7" master version), "MFEO" (raw beats mix), "Work" (Harding and Curnow version), "MFEO" (Cutfather & Joe full version), "MFEO" (steppers mix), "MFEO" (Phil Chill mix).
- "Crazy Chance" was re-released as "Crazy Chance '97" in September 1997 and peaked at #16 on the UK Singles Chart.

== Track listing ==
| No. | Title | Writer(s) | Producer(s) | Length |
|---|---|---|---|---|
| 1. | "Crazy Chance" | Howard Donald, Eliot Kennedy, Mike Ward | Ian Green | 4:09 |
| 2. | "I Can Make You Feel Good" | William Shelby, Howard Hewett, Renwick Jackson | Absolute | 3:33 |
| 3. | "Where Are You" | Kavana | Green | 4:00 |
| 4. | "MFEO" | Kennedy, Pam Sheyne | Cutfather & Joe, Ian Green | 3:31 |
| 5. | "Holdin' Back on U" | Kavana | Phil Chill | 5:12 |
| 6. | "Release It" | Kavana | Don-E | 4:26 |
| 7. | "Wait for the Day" | Kavana | Green | 4:31 |
| 8. | "The Time is Right" | Kavana | Green | 4:06 |
| 9. | "For the Very First Time" | Kavana | Dave Lee | 4:06 |
| 10. | "Protected" | Kavana | Dave Lee | 5:28 |
| 11. | "Jealousy" | Kavana | Andy Whitmore | 3:58 |
| 12. | "Work" | Kavana, Kennedy, Cary Baylis | Phil Harding, Ian Curnow | 4:16 |

Bonus tracks (B-sides)
| No. | Title | Writer(s) | Producer(s) | Length |
|---|---|---|---|---|
| 13. | "One More Chance" | Anthony Kavanagh | | 3:59 |
| 14. | "I'll Follow You" | | | 4:09 |
| 15. | "Listen for the Music" | Anthony Kavanagh | Kavana | 2:43 |
| 16. | "Everything to Me" | | | 3:43 |
| 17. | "Dangerous" | Anthony Kavanagh | Don-E | 4:07 |

== Charts ==
| Chart (1997) | Peak position |
|---|---|
| Scottish Albums Chart | 53 |
| UK Albums Chart | 29 |
