= Girl Thing (album) =

Studio album by Girl Thing
- Released: 13 November 2000 (Australia)
- Recorded: 1998–2000
- Genres: Pop, disco-pop, bubblegum pop
- Length: 61:02
- Label: RCA
- Producers: Simon Cowell (exec.); Steelworks; Absolute; Biffco; StarGate; Trevor Street; John Holliday

Singles from Girl Thing
- 1. "Last One Standing" Released: 19 June 2000; 2. "Girls on Top" Released: 30 October 2000; 3. "Young, Free and Happy" Released: 26 February 2001

Girl Thing is the debut and only studio album by British–Dutch girl group Girl Thing. The album is a mix of 2000s girl pop and 1970s disco.

It features 15 tracks including the singles "Last One Standing", "Girls on Top" and "Young, Free and Happy", which was only released in Australia and New Zealand.

== Background ==
Although Girl Thing is an English group, due to poor sales of their second single "Girls on Top", the album was not initially released in the UK.

The album is notable for including the first version of the song "Pure and Simple", which was released as the debut single by Popstars winners Hear'Say.

The album was released on 13 November 2000 in Australia, where it peaked at number 92 on the Australian albums chart.

The album was finally released in the UK on iTunes 13 years after its original release, coinciding with the group's appearance on the ITV2 television series The Big Reunion.

== Track listing ==
No.	Title	Writer(s)	Producer(s)	Length
1.	"Last One Standing"	Girl Thing; Merrill; Tim Lever; Mike Percy	Steelworks	3:38
2.	"Girls on Top"	Andy Watkins; Paul Wilson; Tracy Ackerman	Absolute	3:24
3.	"Young, Free & Happy"	Richard "Biff" Stannard; Julian Gallagher; Sharon Murphy	Biffco	4:08
4.	"We've Come to Mambo"	Stannard; Gallagher; Murphy; Ash Howes; Martin Harrington	Biffco	3:10
5.	"Last Goodbye"	Girl Thing; Eliot Kennedy; Tim Woodcock; Terry	Steelworks	3:53
6.	"Sometimes You Hit, Sometimes You Miss"	Mikkel Storleer Eriksen; Tor Erik Hermansen; Hallgeir Rustan	StarGate	3:08
7.	"Girl Thing"	Girl Thing; Woodcock; Terry	Steelworks	3:12
8.	"Don't Look Down"	Girl Thing; Kennedy; Lever; Percy	Steelworks	3:31
9.	"Wake Up"	Girl Thing; Trevor Steel; John Holliday	Trevor Street; John Holliday	3:37
10.	"Pure and Simple"	Tim Hawes; Pete Kirtley; Alison Clarkson	Steve Mac	4:31
11.	"From All of Us"	Eriksen; Hermansen; Rustan	StarGate	4:13
12.	"Shhh"	Girl Thing; Watkins; Wilson; Ackerman		3:13
13.	"If That's What It Takes"	Girl Thing; Kennedy; Lever; Percy	Steelworks	3:30
14.	"You Can Run but You Can't Hide"	Girl Thing; Eriksen; Hermansen; Rustan	StarGate	3:47
15.	"Girls on Top" (K-Klass Klub Mix)	Watkins; Wilson; Ackerman	Absolute, K-Klass (remix)	6:22
Total length:				57:17

Australian edition
No.	Title	Writer(s)	Producer(s)	Length
15.	"Sister Love"	Trond Olen; Rustan; Eriksen; Hermansen	StarGate	3:45
16.	"Girls on Top" (K-Klass Klub Mix)	Watkins; Wilson; Ackerman	Absolute, K-Klass (remix)	6:22
Total length:				61:02

== Charts ==
Chart performance for Girl Thing
Chart (2000)	Peak position
Australian Albums (ARIA)	92

== Release history ==
Region	Date	Format(s)	Label(s)	Ref.
Australia	13 November 2000	CD	RCA	
Japan	22 November 2000	CD	Arista	
Worldwide	27 January 2014	Digital download	Sony	
