= Another Lover (Dane Bowers song) =

2001 single by Dane Bowers

Single by Dane

from the album Facing the Crowd
- Released: 25 June 2001
- Genre: R&B
- Length: 4:13
- Label: Arista Records; Northwestside
- Songwriters: Dane Bowers; Scott Whitman; Nathan Thomas
- Producer: Jerry "Wonda" Duplessis

Dane Bowers singles chronology
"Shut Up... and Forget About It" (2001)	"Another Lover" (2001)	"All She Needs" (2010)

"Another Lover" is the second solo single by English singer Dane Bowers from his debut album, Facing the Crowd (2001). Like his previous single, the song also peaked at No. 9 on the UK Singles Chart in July 2001. It was to be his last single with Arista before being dropped by the label. Bowers would release one more single nine years later titled "All She Needs" on the Conehead UK label which failed to chart.

== Track listing ==
UK & Ireland CD single

1. "Another Lover" (Jerry Duplessis Mix) - 4:13
2. "Will I Ever Need to Love Again" (Live at The Kashmir) - 3:46
3. "Another Lover" (Live at The Kashmir) - 4:45
4. Another Lover Video - 3:51

UK 12" vinyl
A1. "Another Lover" (X-Men Vocal) - 5:02
A2. "Another Lover" (X-Men Dark Dub) - 4:48
B1. "Another Lover" (Blacksmith R&B Rub) - 4:54
B2. "Another Lover" (Fyrus Full Mix) - 5:14
