= Crazy Chance =

1998 single by Kavana

- 1996 artwork

Single by Kavana

from the album Kavana
- Released: 29 April 1996
- Length: 4:09
- Label: Virgin
- Songwriters: Howard Donald; Eliot Kennedy; Mike Ward
- Producer: Ian Green

Kavana singles chronology
"Crazy Chance" (1996)	"Where Are You" (1996)

Music video
- "Crazy Chance" on YouTube

Kavana singles chronology
"MFEO" (1997)	"Crazy Chance '97" (1997)	"Special Kind of Something" (1998)

"Crazy Chance" is a song by English singer Kavana, released on 29 April 1996 by Virgin Records, as his debut single and the lead single from his debut self-titled album (1997). The song was written by Howard Donald from Take That with Eliot Kennedy and Mike Ward, and produced by Ian Green. It peaked at number 35 on the UK Singles Chart. In 1997, "Crazy Chance" was re-released and peaked at No. 16 on the UK Singles Chart.

== Track listings ==
- UK CD1, cassette and Australian CD single
1. "Crazy Chance" – 4:09
2. "Wait for the Day" - 4:30
3. "Crazy Chance" (instrumental) – 4:09
4. "Wait for the Day" (instrumental) – 4:30
- UK CD2
1. "Crazy Chance" – 4:09
2. "One More Chance – 4:00
3. "Crazy Chance" (12" version) – 6:53
- Crazy Chance '97 - UK CD1
1. "Crazy Chance '97" – 3:49
2. "Crazy Chance" (original version)– 4:09
3. "Listen to the Music" - 2:43
4. "Crazy Chance" (T-empo's Hard dub) – 9:52
- Crazy Chance '97 - UK CD2
1. "Crazy Chance '97" – 3:49
2. "Everything to Me" - 3:43
3. "Crazy Chance" (T-empo's Hard dub [edit]) – 8:16

== Charts ==
Chart performance for "Crazy Chance"
Chart (1996)	Peak position
Australia (ARIA)	79
Germany (GfK)	79
Scotland (OCC)	31
UK Singles (Official Charts)	35
UK Airplay (Music Week)	41

Chart performance for "Crazy Chance '97"
Chart (1997)	Peak position
Europe (Eurochart Hot 100)	86
Scotland (OCC)	18
UK Singles (Official Charts)	16
