= Shut Up... and Forget About It =

Single by Dane Bowers

from the album Facing the Crowd
- Released: 19 February 2001
- Recorded: 2000
- Genre: Pop; R&B
- Length: 3:09
- Label: Arista Records
- Songwriters: Dane Bowers; Harvey Mason Jr.; Damon Thomas
- Producer: The Underdogs

Dane Bowers singles chronology
"Out of Your Mind" (2000)	"Shut Up... and Forget About It" (2001)	"Another Lover" (2001)

"Shut Up... and Forget About It" is the debut solo single by English singer and songwriter Dane Bowers, released as the lead single from his debut album, Facing the Crowd (2001). A top 10 hit, the song peaked at No. 9 on the UK Singles Chart in early March 2001. The song was produced by the American production duo the Underdogs.

== Track listing ==
CD maxi-single

1. "Shut Up... and Forget About It" (Original Version) - 3:09
2. "Shut Up... and Forget About It" (El-B Vocal Mix) - 5:04
3. "Shut Up... and Forget About It" (G4orce Amnesia Vocal Mix) - 6:25

UK 12" vinyl
A1. "Shut Up... and Forget About It" (El-B Vocal Mix) - 5:04
A2. "Shut Up... and Forget About It" (El-B Dub) - 5:10
B. "Shut Up... and Forget About It" (G4orce Amnesia Vocal Mix) - 6:25
