= Instinct (Kavana album) =

Studio album by Kavana
- Released: 5 October 1998
- Recorded: April–June 1998
- Venue: Italy
- Genre: Pop
- Length: 40:11
- Label: Virgin Records
- Producer: Absolute

Kavana chronology
Kavana (1997)	Instinct (1998)	Special Kind of Something (2007)

Singles from Instinct
- 1. "Special Kind of Something" Released: 17 August 1998; 2. "Funky Love" Released: 30 November 1998; 3. "Will You Wait for Me" Released: 8 March 1999

Instinct is the second album by British singer Kavana. The album was recorded in Italy during the summer of 1998 and was produced by production team Absolute. The album spawned the singles "Special Kind of Something", "Funky Love" and "Will You Wait for Me". The album was released on 5 October 1998 by Virgin Records.

== Singles ==
- "Special Kind of Something" was released as the album's lead single on 17 August 1998, peaking at #13 on the UK Singles Chart.
- "Funky Love" was released as the album's second single on 30 November 1998, peaking at #32 on the UK Singles Chart.
- "Will You Wait for Me" was released as the album's third and final single on 8 March 1999, peaking at #29 on the UK Singles Chart.

== Track listing ==
No.	Title	Writer(s)	Producer(s)	Length
1.	"Special Kind of Something"	Kavana ~ Watkins ~ Wilson	Absolute	3:32
2.	"Funky Love"	Kavana ~ Watkins ~ Wilson	Absolute	4:10
3.	"Will You Wait for Me?"	Kavana ~ Watkins ~ Wilson	Absolute	3:49
4.	"Just the Way It Is"	Kavana ~ Watkins ~ Wilson	Absolute	3:42
5.	"Make Believe"	Kavana ~ Watkins ~ Wilson	Absolute	4:53
6.	"If I Fall"	Kavana ~ Watkins ~ Wilson	Absolute	3:44
7.	"Thank You"	Kavana ~ Watkins ~ Wilson	Absolute	4:37
8.	"Misunderstood"	Kavana ~ Watkins ~ Wilson	Absolute	3:26
9.	"I Believe"	Kavana ~ Watkins ~ Wilson	Absolute	4:07
10.	"Good Luck Next Time"	Kavana ~ Watkins ~ Wilson	Absolute	4:11

Bonus tracks (B-sides)
No.	Title	Writer(s)	Producer(s)	Length
11.	"Is That You"	Kavana ~ R. Derbyshire ~ J. McMillan	Johnny Douglas
12.	"Isn't Love Insane"
13.	"Him or Me"
