= Dane Bowers =

British singer, songwriter and music producer

- Born: November 28, 1979 (age 46)
- Genres: R&B; pop; UK garage
- Occupations: Singer; songwriter; DJ; producer
- Years active: 1997–present
- Label: Conehead UK
- Member of: Another Level
- Formerly of: Upper Street; 5th Story; Boyz on Block

Dane Bowers is an English singer, songwriter, producer and DJ. He is a part of R&B boy band Another Level. Bowers has also had solo success. He has made TV appearances on Celebrity Big Brother 7 and the celebrity version of Come Dine with Me. He was part of the supergroup 5th Story, set up for the second series of The Big Reunion.

== Early life and education ==
Bowers was born to Jackie Bowers and Cuban-Jamaican soul DJ Andy Jackson. He was educated at two independent schools for boys: at Cumnor House School in the town of Croydon in South London, followed by Trinity School of John Whitgift, at Shirley Park in the London Borough of Croydon. When he was fifteen years old, after leaving school, he enrolled at a Croydon-based performing arts college, the BRIT School.

== Music career ==
After leaving the BRIT School, Bowers joined British boy-band Another Level, where he performed as a part of the group for three years, between 1997 and 2000, with fellow members Mark Baron, Wayne Williams, and Bobak Kianoush.

Another Level gained seven top 10 singles in two years in the United Kingdom, including 1998's UK No. 1 "Freak Me"; and a platinum-selling self-titled debut album. Their follow-up album, Nexus, released in 1999, achieved gold-selling status, and was followed by a Brit Award nomination for Best British Newcomer in 1999.

Another Level also performed as the supporting act on the European leg of Janet Jackson's The Velvet Rope World Tour in 1998.

After Another Level split in 2000, Bowers wrote and fronted two UK top 10 hits for the UK garage act True Steppers in 2000: "Buggin" and "Out of Your Mind". "Buggin" reached No. 6 on the UK Singles Chart in April 2000. The latter featured the first solo recording of Spice Girl Victoria Beckham, and reached No. 2; it was beaten to the number one spot by Spiller featuring Sophie Ellis-Bextor with "Groovejet (If This Ain't Love)" in August 2000.

In 2001, two solo singles released under the moniker of 'Dane', "Shut Up... and Forget About It" (allegedly written about his relationship with Katie Price) and "Another Lover", both reached No. 9 on the UK Singles Chart, and an album, Facing the Crowd remained unreleased.

Bowers subsequently went on to focus on behind the scenes work, writing and producing, including a collaboration for Victoria Beckham's debut solo album in autumn that year.

In early 2010, Bowers played a DJ set in Mantra, Castlebar Co. Mayo. It was one of his most successful live events.

In 2010 he discussed possible collaboration with Basshunter and considered a return to his musical career. Ultimately Bowers returned to making music and signed with independent record label Conehead UK to record a pop album, with the first single, "All She Needs", written by Jamie Scott, released in July 2010.

On 27 August 2013, Another Level was on the verge of signing up for the ITV2 documentary The Big Reunion, but Williams announced that he would not take part. In an interview with MTV UK, he said: "I decided not to participate in The Big Reunion because it wouldn't feel right to me...I'm in a totally different space in my life and I don't feel any need to look back." Bowers instead joined The Big Reunion supergroup 5th Story, along with Kenzie from Blazin' Squad and former soloists Adam Rickitt, Kavana and Gareth Gates.

In 2019, Bowers joined another supergroup alongside Five's Abz Love, Boyzone's Shane Lynch and Phats & Small's Ben Ofoedu called Boyz on Block who released covers of East 17's "Stay Another Day" featuring songwriter and former East 17 member Tony Mortimer; and K-Ci & JoJo's "All My Life" with an album scheduled for a 2021 release.

== Television ==
Bowers began television presenting in 2002, co-hosting Popstars: The Rivals "Extra" show with the former Pop Idol contestant Hayley Evetts.

Bowers appeared in the follow-up TV show to Totally Scott-Lee, called Totally Boyband, in which five boyband members from past groups were modelled into a new singing act called Upper Street. The group featured him alongside Lee Latchford-Evans of Steps, Jimmy Constable of 911, New Kids on the Block's Danny Wood, and S Club's Bradley McIntosh. The series commenced on MTV in the UK in September 2006, but their first single, "The One" only charted at No. 35 and the group subsequently disbanded.

In 2009, Bowers appeared in an episode of Celebrity Come Dine with Me alongside Bobby Davro, Laila Morse, and Dani Behr, where he served langoustines, beef tenderloin, and bread and butter pudding. Bowers's theme for the evening was 'funky, cool and fashionable'.

In 2010, Bowers made TV appearances on Loose Women on ITV and Live from Studio Five.

=== Celebrity Big Brother 7 ===
On 3 January 2010, Bowers was the seventh contestant to enter Channel 4's seventh and final series of Celebrity Big Brother. He made it to the final on 29 January 2010, but finished as runner-up to Alex Reid.

== Personal life ==
As of 2025, Bowers lives in Dubai, United Arab Emirates. He split up with long term girlfriend Laura Anderson, who was runner-up on the fourth series of Love Island on 5 August 2022.

In June 2012, Bowers was accused of racially aggravated assault and harassment in connection with an incident in Norwich on 2 June 2012. In December 2012, Bowers admitted one count of assault and one of threatening behaviour during a drunken fight. He denied making racist remarks. The judge accepted his guilty plea, saying "It seems highly unlikely that you, given your background, would have made racist remarks." Bowers was sentenced to unpaid community work.

In October 2012, Bowers began playing football for the 3rd team of Cwmbran Celtic which plays in the Torfaen and District League. He made his match debut in a 3–1 home defeat to Marshfield AFC. The chairman of Cwmbran Celtic said he "hopefully will enjoy his stay with us. He's a nice lad."

== Discography ==
=== As Dane Bowers ===
Single	Year	Chart position
Single	Year	UK
"Buggin" (with True Steppers)	2000	6
"Out of Your Mind" (featuring Victoria Beckham)	2000	2
"Shut Up... and Forget About It"	2001	9
"Another Lover"	2001	9
"All She Needs"	2010	—
"Embrace" (with Finest Touch & Bartosz Brenes)	2013	—

=== With Upper Street ===
Single	Year	Chart position
Single	Year	UK
"The One"	2006	35

=== With Boyz on Block ===
Single	Year	Album	Chart position
Single	Year	Album	UK
"Stay Another Day" featuring Tony Mortimer	2020	N/A	—
"All My Life"	2021	N/A	—

=== Facing the Crowd ===
Facing the Crowd

Studio album by Dane Bowers
- Released: 10 December 2021
- Recorded: 2001
- Genres: Pop; R&B; UK garage
- Length: 35:13
- Labels: Arista Records; Northwestside
- Producers: Jerry "Wonda" Duplessis; Dallas Austin; The Underdogs; Scott Whitman; Nathan Thomas; Dow & Young; Michael Harwood; Cutfather & Joe; Christopher "Tricky" Stewart; Mark Sheehan; Allstar

Singles from Facing the Crowd
- 1. "Shut Up... and Forget About It" Released: 19 February 2001; 2. "Another Lover" Released: 25 June 2001

Facing the Crowd is Bowers debut album, released under the moniker of 'Dane'. The album was due for release in 2001, but was cancelled and he was subsequently dropped by his record label. A small number of physical copies pressed for distribution to media and radio stations were made available before the album's release was cancelled. The album spawned two UK Singles Chart top ten singles, "Shut Up... and Forget About It" and "Another Lover".

Facing the Crowd was released on streaming services on 10 December 2021.

==== Background ====
After Another Level split in 2000, Bowers wrote and fronted two UK Singles Chart top ten singles for the UK garage act True Steppers in 2000, where he was billed as "Dane Bowers from Another Level". "Buggin" entered the charts at No. 6 in April 2000, and "Out of Your Mind", featuring the first solo recording of Spice Girl, Victoria Beckham, which reached No. 2, as it was beaten to the number one spot by "Groovejet (If This Ain't Love)" in August 2000 by Spiller featuring Sophie Ellis-Bextor. His subsequent chart success lead to a solo record deal, and in February 2001, Bowers released "Shut Up... and Forget About It", a song allegedly written about his relationship with Katie Price. The song peaked at No. 9 on the UK Singles Chart. Jerry 'Wonder' Duplessis and Wyclef Jean-produced "Another Lover" was released as the album's second single in June 2001, but this again stalled at number nine. Bowers was subsequently dropped from his label, and Facing the Crowd remained unreleased. Bowers subsequently went on to focus on behind the scenes work, writing and producing, including a collaboration for Victoria Beckham's debut solo album in autumn that year.

==== Track listing ====
No.	Title	Writer(s)	Producer(s)	Length
1.	"Shut Up... and Forget About It"	Dane Bowers; Harvey Mason Jr.; Damon Thomas	The Underdogs	3:09
2.	"Bump"	Bowers; Hagen Hammond; Michael Harwood	Harwood	4:03
3.	"Another Lover"	Bowers; Nathan Thomas; Scott Whitman	Jerry "Wonda" Duplessis	4:13
4.	"She's Gettin' It Somewhere Else"	Bowers; N. Thomas; Whitman	N. Thomas; Whitman	3:31
5.	"She's Lying"	Joe Belmaati; Bowers; Mich Hansen	Cutfather & Joe	3:54
6.	"Girl Ain't Mine" (featuring Dallas Austin)	Dallas Austin; Terence Daly; Danny O'Donoghue; Mark Sheehan	Austin; Sheehan	4:00
7.	"He Say, She Say" (featuring Dyme)	Bowers; John Campbell; Aisha Hassan; Alan Gordon; Joylon Skinner	Allstar	3:39
8.	"We All Know"	Bowers; Dow Brain; Bradley Young	Dow & Young	3:45
9.	"A Man"	Derrick Scott; Christopher "Tricky" Stewart	Stewart	3:36
10.	"Will I Ever Need to Love Again"	Bowers; N. Thomas; Whitman	N. Thomas; Whitman	3:33
11.	"Feels So Natural"	Belmaati; Bowers; Hansen	Cutfather & Joe	3:37

=== Other releases ===
- CD Collection (2001)
  - Given free with Smash Hits magazine in 2001 in conjunction with Little Chef. Contains "Shut Up and Forget About It" (original version and El B Vocal Mix).
