= Girl Thing =

British girl group

- Origin: London, England
- Genres: Pop; bubblegum; Europop
- Years active: 1998–2001; 2013–2014
- Label: RCA
- Spinoffs: Wonderland
- Members: Jodi Albert; Michelle Barber; Anika Bostelaar; Linzi Martin; Nikki Stuart

Girl Thing were a British girl group, consisting of members Jodi Albert, Michelle Barber, Anika Bostelaar, Linzi Martin, and Nikki Stuart. They were formed in 1998 by Simon Cowell and were originally intended to rival the Spice Girls, but their success was minor and short-lived before disbanding in 2001.

The group reformed in 2013 for the second series of The Big Reunion to perform a one-off gig at the Hammersmith Apollo in 2014.

== Career ==
In 1998, Simon Cowell, having previously turned down the Spice Girls, decided to form his own girl group. Girl Thing's debut single "Last One Standing", written and produced by the Steelworks production team of Tim Lever, Mike Percy and Eliot Kennedy. "Last One Standing" received major promotion and media attention and was expected to top the UK Singles Chart with ease. Record company executives funneled huge amounts of money into the promotional campaign, including an appearance at the top of the Eiffel Tower. Girl Thing even pre-recorded their congratulatory interview with BBC Radio 1. However, the song ended up only charting at number eight. It also made the Australian top 20, where it achieved gold certification. Linzi Martin co-wrote the song "Bounce" for Aaron Carter (with Hawes and Kirtley) that featured on his second album, which went on to sell 3 million copies in 2000. After the failure of their second single "Girls on Top", which reached number 25, the album release was cancelled in Britain. It was, however, still released in Australia, New Zealand, India and Japan. The band also recorded the songs "Young, Free & Happy", "Extraordinary Love", "Summer Daze", "If That's What It Takes", "Last Goodbye" and "You Can Run but You Can't Hide". The band also recorded "Pure and Simple", before it was given to Hear'Say, the winners of ITV's Popstars.

In December 2013, the band reformed to take part in the second series of ITV2's The Big Reunion, and performed a one-off concert in March 2014

== Post-split ==
- Jodi Albert appeared on the Channel 4 soap opera Hollyoaks as Debbie Dean before joining short-lived girl group Wonderland. She married Westlife singer Kian Egan in 2009 with whom she has three sons.
- Michelle Barber worked as a presenter on Nickelodeon.
- In July 2007, Anika Bostelaar released a single called "King of the Dancefloor" under the name 'Kiana'. She also passed the audition in the Dutch-Flemish TV programme K2 zoekt K3, but she did not qualify for the live shows. In 2016, Anika Bostelaar created a Dutch girl group named Hello August. Hello August released their debut single "Wrong Chick" in January 2018.
- Nicola Harrington makes occasional appearances on the ITV programme Lorraine.
- In 2014, Linzi Martin auditioned for The X Factor, but failed to get through to bootcamp.

== Discography ==
=== Albums ===
List of albums, with selected chart positions and certifications
Title	Album details	Peak chart positions
Title	Album details	AUS
Girl Thing	Released: November 2000; Label: RCA Records; Format: CD	92

=== Singles ===
List of singles as lead artist, with selected chart positions
Title	Year	Peak chart positions							Certification	Album
Title	Year	UK	AUS	GER	IRE	NED	NOR	SWE	Certification	Album
"Last One Standing"	2000	8	17	82	16	11	—	24	ARIA: Gold	Girl Thing
"Girls on Top"	2000	25	42	—	—	52	13	—		Girl Thing
"Young, Free and Happy"	2001	—	92	—	—	—	—	—		Girl Thing
