= Wonderland (band) =

Irish girlband (2008–2011)

- Wonderland in July 2011.

Background information
- Origin: Dublin, Ireland
- Genres: Pop; country
- Years active: 2008–2011
- Label: Mercury
- Past members: Jodi Albert; Sharon Condon; Corrina Durran; Leigh Learmont; Kasey Smith

Wonderland were an Irish girl group formed by Louis Walsh and Westlife band-member Kian Egan. The band were put together after auditions were held for five females in July 2008. Its five members were Jodi Albert, Sharon Condon, Corrina Durran, Leigh Learmont, and Kasey Smith. Wonderland's debut single "Not a Love Song" was released on 25 February 2011 in Ireland and on 6 March 2011 in the United Kingdom. Their eponymous debut album was released on 6 June 2011, the same day as their second single, "Starlight". Wonderland released their third single, "Nothing Moves Me Anymore", in August 2011. The following month, it was announced the band had been dropped by their record label. The group later decided to split up.

== Formation ==
In July 2008, it was announced that Louis Walsh and Westlife singer Kian Egan were to hold open auditions for a new girl group that they would co-manage. Auditions for five females between the ages of fifteen and twenty-five were held in Dublin that month. On 26 July 2008, seven hundred girls auditioned for the girl group in front of Walsh, Egan and A&R scout, Sheila Burgess. Walsh said "We're looking for talent. Undiscovered talent, young with a good attitude and who will look good. We don't want good -- we want great." Over three thousand hopefuls auditioned. In December 2008, it was revealed that the band had been put together, but had not been named. Sharon Condon, Corrina Durran, Leigh Learmont, Kasey Smith, and Jodi Albert were picked to form the new band. Albert told Hello Magazine in February 2011 that around three thousand girls turned up to the auditions. She said that over three months, there were eight rounds where the numbers got smaller and eventually the girls were whittled down to the five who formed the band. Albert added that the girls had "gravitated towards each other" and become friends during the process.

The girls decided to name the band Wonderland and Learmont revealed that it took the band a year and a half to come up with the name. Condon told Maria Duffy of Hello Magazine that the band thought of names such as "Daisy Chains and Wildflowers but nothing seemed right." Egan eventually came up with the name Wonderland after he noticed a poster for the 2010 adaptation of Alice in Wonderland on the side of a bus. Condon explained, "It just clicked with him straight away and when he put it to us and to the record company, we just all knew it was right. Now I couldn't imagine any other name."

== History ==
In October 2008, it was reported that Wonderland had signed a six figure record deal with Mercury Records. The band made their first live television appearance on The Late Late Show in December 2008. In May 2010, it was announced that Wonderland were to support Westlife on their Where We Are Tour. The band were also invited to play at the 2010 Isle of Wight Festival. Walsh announced that he would launch Wonderland with a reality television programme, entitled Louis Walsh & Kian Egan's Next Big Thing (previously The Management) in October 2010. The programme followed the band for two years as they prepared to release their debut single and album. It began airing on ITV2 on 30 October 2010 in the UK and was later broadcast on TV3 in Ireland. Wonderland were given a mention on the popular gossip blog written by Perez Hilton, after fans sent him a link to one of their performances.

Wonderland's debut single was confirmed to be "Not a Love Song" and it was released in Ireland on 25 February 2011 and in the UK on 6 March. Albert described the song as "fun and cheeky". She added that it has a "rocky edge", but with a bit of country in it too. During an interview with Digital Spy, Durran said they had received a positive reception to the song when they sang it on the Westlife tour. On 4 March 2011, Wonderland released an EP entitled Introduction to Wonderland. The EP contains "Not a Love Song", one music video and three live acoustic tracks. The band recorded their self-titled debut album in 2010. In a November 2010 interview, Durran said that nine tracks had been recorded, with a few more to finish. Wonderland worked with Andy Hill, Shep Solomon and Bob Clearmountain on the tracks. "In Your Arms" written with Mark Owen and a cover of Lady Antebellum's "Need You Now" were confirmed for the album.

In February and March 2011, Wonderland toured with both Boyzone and Westlife around the UK and Ireland. The band also performed at several schools around the country. Durran said that the experience was "one of the best things we've ever done" and that the band had had a "brilliant reaction and have been bombarded with positive comments on facebook from the students." Wonderland toured with Olly Murs during April and May 2011 and will support American rapper 50 Cent on his UK tour later in the year. Wonderland was released on 6 June 2011, the same day as the band's second single "Starlight". "Nothing Moves Me Anymore" was released as the third single from the album. In September 2011, Melanie Finn of the Evening Herald reported Wonderland had been dropped by Mercury Records. Of the news, Walsh told Finn "They had some great songs, they could all sing and they worked really hard. They tried to do something different and it's just a shame it didn't work out. But people haven't heard the last of them." Egan also confirmed the news and added "It's been an amazing journey for us all. Incredible memories were made." Caitriona Giblin of the Irish Daily Star reported Wonderland's future remained uncertain as no one had confirmed any plans for them to continue.

On 19 September, Condon told the Evening Herald that she planned to launch a solo career, despite Walsh and Egan's attempts to keep Wonderland together. The singer opined the group cannot continue as they do not have the dancers or the production to succeed. She also explained Albert's pregnancy would have made things more difficult for the band, saying "If you look at Una Healy now from The Saturdays, she's fine because they are an established band, but we weren't. At the end of the day, I don't really know the reason we were dropped, maybe our music just wasn't good enough, but I think there was more to it than that." Condon thought Wonderland were not what people were looking for as they tried to be something different with their sound and style. She revealed to the paper that there are talks about redesigning the band. On 28 September 2011, it was confirmed Wonderland had split up. The band posted a message on their Facebook page saying:

"As some of you may know already we have parted ways with Mercury Records. We have taken the past few weeks to consider our future as a band. After a lot of thinking and talking we have decided that we will no longer continue as Wonderland. We feel we have given it all we have and we could not take it any further. We want to say a massive thank you to all our fans for the love and support they have shown us over the three years we have been together. We really feel we had an amazing time and it will be something we remember for the rest of our lives."

== Discography ==
=== Studio albums ===
Title	Album details	Peak chart positions		
Title	Album details	IRE	UK	SCO
Wonderland	Released: 6 June 2011; Label: Mercury Records; Format: CD, Digital download	6	8	7
"—" denotes releases that did not chart.

=== Extended plays ===
Title	Album details
Introduction to Wonderland	Released: 4 March 2011; Label: Mercury Records; Format: Digital download

=== Singles ===
Year	Single	Chart positions		Album
Year	Single	IRE	UK	Album
2011	"Not a Love Song"	22	144	Wonderland
2011	"Starlight"	—	57	Wonderland
2011	"Nothing Moves Me Anymore"	—	—	Wonderland
"—" denotes releases that did not chart or were not released.

== Filmography ==
- 2010: Louis Walsh and Kian Egan's Next Big Thing

== Awards and nominations ==
Year	Nominee	Award	Category	Result	Ref
2011	Wonderland	Glamour Women of the Year Awards	Best Band	Nominated	
2011	Wonderland	BT Digital Music Awards	Breakthrough Artist of the Year	Nominated	
