= Last One Standing (Girl Thing song) =

2000 song by Girl Thing

Single by Girl Thing

from the album Girl Thing
- B-side: "Extraordinary Love"; "Summer Daze"
- Released: 19 June 2000
- Length: 3:37
- Label: RCA; BMG
- Songwriters: Girl Thing; George Merrill; Eliot Kennedy; Mike Percy; Tim Lever
- Producers: Eliot Kennedy; Mike Percy; Tim Lever

Girl Thing singles chronology
"Last One Standing" (2000)	"Girls on Top" (2000)

Music video
- "Last One Standing" on YouTube

"Last One Standing" is a song by British girl group Girl Thing. It was released on 19 June 2000 as the lead single from their self-titled debut studio album and as their debut single. The track was written by Girl Thing, George Merrill, Eliot Kennedy, Mike Percy and Tim Lever, and produced by Kennedy, Percy and Lever. "Last One Standing" was Girl Thing's only UK top-10 hit, peaking at number eight on the UK Singles Chart. The track was a greater success in Australia, spending 14 weeks in the top 100 and earning a gold certification.

== Chart performance ==
"Last One Standing" received major promotion and media attention and was expected to top the UK Singles Chart with ease. Record company executives funneled huge amounts of money into the promotional campaign, including an appearance at the top of the Eiffel Tower. Girl Thing even pre-recorded their congratulatory interview with BBC Radio 1; however, the song ended up charting at only number eight. In Australia, the song peaked at number 17, spent 23 weeks in the top 100, and was certified gold.

== Track listings ==
UK CD1

1. "Last One Standing"
2. "Extraordinary Love"
3. "Last One Standing" (video)

UK CD2

1. "Last One Standing"
2. "Summer Daze"
3. Girl Thing interview

UK cassette single and European CD single

1. "Last One Standing"
2. "Extraordinary Love"

Australian CD single

1. "Last One Standing"
2. "Extraordinary Love"
3. "Summer Daze"
4. Exclusive audio interview
5. Enhanced CD featuring video

== Charts ==
=== Weekly charts ===
Chart (2000)	Peak position
Australia (ARIA)	17
Belgium (Ultratip Bubbling Under Flanders)	18
Belgium (Ultratip Bubbling Under Wallonia)	17
Europe (Eurochart Hot 100)	40
Germany (GfK)	82
Ireland (IRMA)	16
Netherlands (Dutch Top 40)	16
Netherlands (Single Top 100)	11
Scotland Singles (Official Charts)	9
Spain (Top 40 Radio)	39
Sweden (Sverigetopplistan)	24
UK Singles (Official Charts)	8

=== Year-end charts ===
Chart (2000)	Position
Australia (ARIA)	90
UK Singles (OCC)	177

== Certifications ==
Region	Certification	Certified units/sales
Australia (ARIA)	Gold	35,000^{^}
^{^} Shipments figures based on certification alone.
