= Kavana (singer) =

English singer

- Born: Anthony Gerard Kavanagh; 4 November 1977 (age 48); Moston, Manchester, England
- Genre: Pop
- Occupation: Singer
- Instruments: Vocals
- Years active: 1996–present
- Label: Virgin

Kavana (born Anthony Gerard Kavanagh, 4 November 1977) is an English singer who scored a number of hit singles in the late 1990s, and won Smash Hits' Best Male Artist award. His second album, Instinct, went platinum in Asia; this was followed by a tour of Australia and Japan. Kavana moved to Los Angeles in 2001, where he appeared in cult MTV soap opera Undressed. In 2014, he became part of the supergroup 5th Story, who took part in the second series of The Big Reunion, and followed this with a major arena tour in the UK. In 2015, he took part in the fifteenth series of the Channel 5 reality series Celebrity Big Brother, making the final week.

== Career ==
He released two albums, Kavana (1997) and Instinct (1999), and enjoyed a number of chart singles, including "I Can Make You Feel Good" (his debut UK top-10 hit, reaching number 8), "MFEO" (another number-8 hit) and "Will You Wait for Me?". Other songs include "Crazy Chance", "Thank You" and "Special Kind of Something". He resided in Los Angeles for several years, where he appeared in commercials and the MTV series Undressed, and had a publishing deal as a songwriter. In 2005, he appeared in the music video for "Today", by his friend Melanie Brown, before returning to the United Kingdom.

In 2006, Kavana played a recurring role in a number of episodes of E4's Hollyoaks: In the City. He also began working with Jools Holland as a session musician and backing vocalist. He appeared as a contestant on Grease Is the Word in April 2007 and got put through to "boot camp", where he was paired with Alison Crawford. Although Crawford was eliminated, Kavana managed a place in the final, during which he was declared runner-up on 9 June 2007.

In 2008, he appeared in the theatre production The Extra Factor, a fictional on-stage musical based on The X Factor.

In 2011, he toured with G*Mania, a musical show inspired by the TV series Glee. The cast recorded a Christmas single, a cover of "Don't Stop Believin'" by Journey. Kavana appeared in the music video.

He appeared on the 2013 series of BBC Saturday night singing show The Voice UK, in which he failed to progress past the audition stage.

In December 2013, it was announced that Kavana, Dane Bowers, Gareth Gates, Kenzie and Adam Rickitt would join to form a supergroup called 5th Story for series 2 of The Big Reunion.

In January 2015, he took part in the Channel 5 reality series Celebrity Big Brother. He came 7th. Later that year, he released a new single, "Deja Vu", his first for many years.

Kavana's memoir, Pop Scars, was published in July 2025.

== Personal life ==
In February 2014, Kavana came out publicly as gay and said that his biggest regret was never telling his parents. He has battled with alcoholism and been in rehab twice, first in 2017 and again in 2022. In November 2023, he announced he had been sober for a year. By July 2025, he had been sober for three years, and was writing a memoir.

== Discography ==
=== Albums ===
List of studio albums, with selected chart positions
| Title | Album details | Peak chart positions |
| Title | Album details | UK |
|---|---|---|
| Kavana | Released: April 1997; Label: Virgin Records (724384413729); Formats: CS, CD | 29 |
| Instinct | Released: October 1998; Label: Virgin Records (724384660505); Formats: CS, CD | — |

=== Compilation albums ===
List of compilation albums, with selected details
| Title | Album details |
|---|---|
| Thank You - Greatest Hits | Released: 2000; Label: Virgin Records, EMI (724384950224); Formats: CS, CD |
| Special Kind of Something – The Best of Kavana | Released: July 2007; Label: Virgin Records, EMI Gold (50297528); Formats: CD |

=== Singles ===
| Year | Title | Peak chart positions | | | | Album |
| Year | Title | UK | AUS | GER | NZ | Album |
|---|---|---|---|---|---|---|
| 1996 | "Crazy Chance" | 35 | 79 | 79 | — | Kavana |
| 1996 | "Where Are You" | 26 | — | — | — | Kavana |
| 1997 | "I Can Make You Feel Good" | 8 | 32 | 71 | — | Kavana |
| 1997 | "MFEO" | 8 | — | 89 | — | Kavana |
| 1997 | "Crazy Chance '97" | 16 | — | — | — | non-album single |
| 1998 | "Special Kind of Something" | 13 | 83 | — | — | Instinct |
| 1998 | "Funky Love" | 32 | 91 | — | — | Instinct |
| 1999 | "Will You Wait for Me?" | 29 | 65 | — | 22 | Instinct |
| 2009 | "Any Other Way" (as Anthony Kavanagh) | — | — | — | — | Non-album singles |
| 2015 | "Déjà Vu" | — | — | — | — | Non-album singles |

== Filmography ==
| Year | Show | Role | Notes |
|---|---|---|---|
| 2001 | Undressed | Dr. Johnny | Recurring (Season 5) |
| 2006 | Hollyoaks: In the City | Will | 3 episodes |
| 2014 | Mirrors | Madonna | Short film |
| 2015 | Celebrity Big Brother | Himself/Housemate | Series 15 |
