= Jodi Albert =

British singer, actress (born 1983)

- Born: Jodi Albert; 22 July 1983 (age 43); Chingford, London, England
- Genres: Pop; teen pop
- Occupations: Singer, actress
- Instrument: Vocals
- Years active: 1998–present
- Labels: Universal; Mercury; RCA
- Formerly of: Girl Thing; Wonderland

Jodi Albert (born 22 July 1983) is a British actress and singer, best known for playing Debbie Dean in the Channel 4 soap opera Hollyoaks, as a member of Simon Cowell's British girl group Girl Thing, and as a member of Irish girl group Wonderland.

== Early life ==
Jodi Albert attended the independent Sylvia Young Theatre School, and shared lessons with Lee Ryan, Matt Willis, Billie Piper, and Amy Winehouse. At the age of ten, she was cast in the starring role of Young Cosette in Les Misérables at London's Palace Theatre.

Albert signed her first recording contract at age 15 years old to Simon Cowell's group Girl Thing. They had a top ten hit and their album went gold in Asia and Australia. Girl Thing subsequently reunited for the second series of The Big Reunion.

In 2002, Albert joined the cast of the soap opera Hollyoaks on Channel 4, playing Debbie Dean. She left in 2005 but returned for guest appearances in 2005 and 2006. In 2005, Albert won the British Soap Award for Sexiest Female for her role in Hollyoaks. After leaving Hollyoaks, she appeared in Five sitcom Respectable; Casualty, and The Inspector Lynley Mysteries for the BBC; and the British film Popcorn, opposite ex-EastEnders star Jack Ryder.

In 2008, Albert signed her second record deal and became part of the Irish-based girl group Wonderland, who wrote and helped create their successful UK top ten 10 album, Wonderland. She was heavily involved in the creative part of this band formed with Kian Egan, in partnership with music manager Louis Walsh.

Albert has posed for numerous photoshoots for several men's magazines, including Maxim and FHM, and is featured in Maxim's "Girls of Maxim" gallery, also being named three times in FHM's 100 Sexiest Women list: No. 93 in 2003; No. 73 in 2004; and No. 65 in 2005.

== Personal life ==
Albert married Kian Egan, a member of the Irish vocal group Westlife, on 9 May 2009, in Barbados. On 31 July 2011, the couple announced they were expecting their first baby. The birth of their son Koa was announced on 20 December 2011. In November 2014, it was announced that they were expecting their second child. In February 2015, her mother, Eileen, died after suffering from cancer for eight years. On 21 May 2015, Albert gave birth to her second child, a son named Zekey. On 30 March 2017, Jodi announced on her Instagram that they were expecting their third child. Their third son, Cobi Egan, was born on 29 September 2017. The family live in Strandhill, County Sligo.

== Filmography ==
Year	Title	Role	Notes
2002–2004, 2006	Hollyoaks	Debbie Dean	Series regular
2003	The Debt	Sophie Stokes	Television film
2005	Casualty	Jody Tiller	Episode: "Big Bang Theory"
2006	The Inspector Lynley Mysteries	Sally	Episode: "One Guilty Deed"
2006	Respectable	Hayley	6 episodes
2007	Popcorn	Suki	
2007	Casualty	Sophie Sutton	Episode: "It Never Rains"
2007	Katy Brand's Big Ass Show		Series 1 Episode 3
2007	Popcorn: How to Compliment a Girl	Suki	Video short

== Songwriting credits ==
- "Air Brush"
- "Believe"
- "Bounce"
- "Don't Look Down"
- "Getting Mad Not Even"
- "Girl Thing"
- "Girlfriend"
- "If That's What It Takes"
- "Last Goodbye"
- "Last One Standing"
- "Like Ya Like It"
- "Not a Love Song"
- "Signs"
- "That's The Way We Do It"
- "Time Has Run Out"
- "One for the Summer"

=== Demo ===
- "La Dolce Vita"

=== Cameo appearance ===
- Westlife – "Us Against the World"
