= CelebAir =

British television series

- Genre: Reality television
- Presented by: Angellica Bell
- Narrated by: Ted May
- Opening theme: "Getting Better"
- Ending theme: "Getting Better"
- Composer: Shed Seven
- Country of origin: United Kingdom
- Original language: English
- No. of series: 1
- No. of episodes: 8

Production
- Production locations: London Gatwick Airport; Manchester Airport
- Running time: 60 mins (inc. breaks)
- Production companies: Zeppotron; Initial

Original release
- Network: ITV2
- Release: 2 September – 23 October 2008

CelebAir is a reality television series in which 11 celebrities perform the duties of cabin crew and check-in attendants. The series was presented by Angellica Bell and aired on ITV2 from 2 September 2008 until 23 October 2008, when Lisa Maffia was declared the winner.

== Production ==
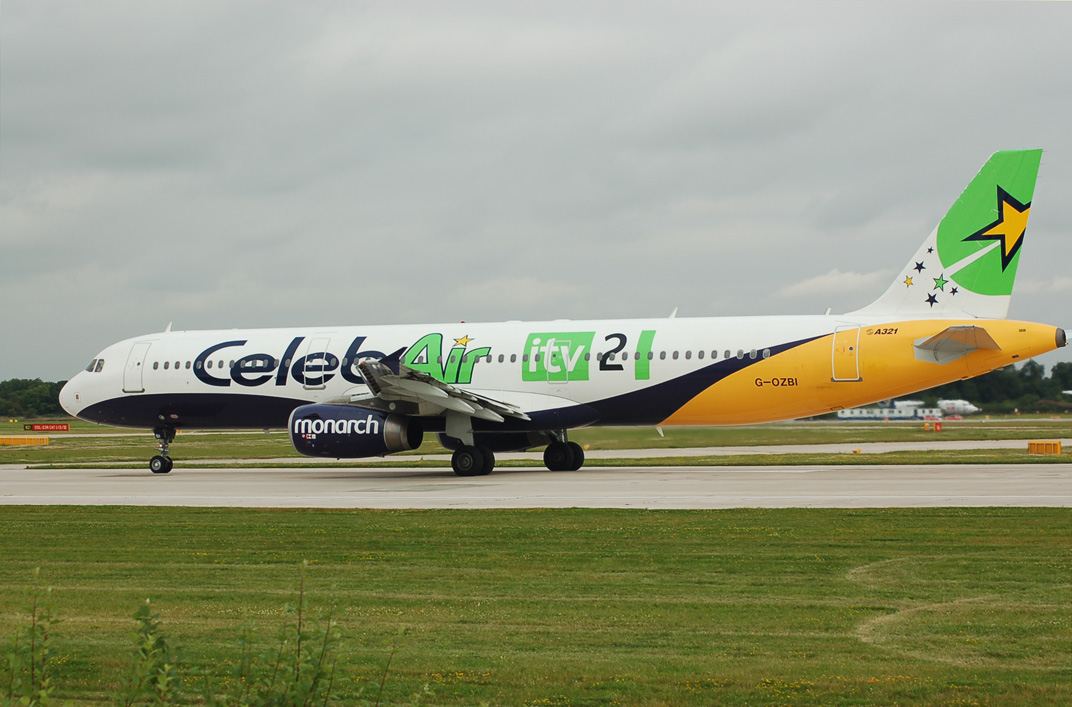
The CelebAir Airbus A321 at Manchester Airport.

For the show, Monarch Airlines repainted one of its Airbus A321 aircraft, registration G-OZBI, with the CelebAir logo along with a new tail fin design. The aircraft was used for the majority of CelebAir flights although the celebrities additionally worked on normal Monarch branded aircraft.

The series is set in London Gatwick Airport and, in the finale, the private jet took off and landed at London Stansted Airport. There are seven destinations that CelebAir flew to; those being Tenerife South Airport, Faro Airport, Málaga Airport, Ibiza Airport, Mahon Airport, Larnaca International Airport and Alicante Airport.

== Celebrities ==
CelebAir activity took place on Monarch flights which were already part of the summer schedule; with the rear of the aircraft allocated as the CelebAir cabin with the celebrities working from the rear galley along with their mentors.

Before any of the celebrities were allowed to start their new jobs, they undertook a six-week training programme run by Monarch and were required to adhere to Monarch's standards whilst working for CelebAir.

Celebrity	Occupation	Status
Mica Paris	Singer & television presenter	Eliminated 1st on 2 September 2008
Kenzie	Blazin' Squad rapper	Eliminated 2nd on 9 September 2008
Tamara Beckwith	Socialite	Eliminated 3rd on 16 September 2008
Phil Cornwell	Comedian & impressionist	Eliminated 4th on 23 September 2008
Johnny Shentall	Hear'Say singer	Eliminated 5th & 6th on 2 October 2008
Lisa Scott-Lee	Former Steps singer	Eliminated 5th & 6th on 2 October 2008
Dan O'Connor	Neighbours actor	Eliminated 7th on 9 October 2008
Michelle Marsh	Glamour model	Eliminated 8th on 16 October 2008
Chico Slimani	The X Factor contestant	Third place on 23 October 2008
Amy Lamé	Comedian	Runner-up on 23 October 2008
Lisa Maffia	Singer-songwriter & model	Winner on 23 October 2008

Notes

- Beckwith was pregnant whilst filming was taking place. Due to her pregnancy she was unable to work on the flights.
- Lisa and Jonny were sacked in a double elimination due to the two of them abandoning their cabin crew duties to party for two hours at Eden in Ibiza instead of crewing the return flight to London Gatwick.

== Mentors ==
- Ross Archer
- Lauren Newton
- Brian Martin
- Sara Turner

== Ratings ==
Show	Original air date	Overnight ratings	Source
Episode 1	2 September	549,000	
Episode 2	9 September	266,000	
Episode 3	16 September	235,000	
Episode 4	23 September	163,000	
Episode 5	2 October	—	—
Episode 6	9 October	273,000	
Episode 7	16 October	235,000	
Episode 8	23 October	254,000	

"—" denotes where information currently unavailable
