= Girls on Top (song) =

2000 song performed by Girl Thing

Single by Girl Thing

from the album Girl Thing
- Released: 30 October 2000
- Length: 3:24
- Label: RCA
- Songwriter(s): Andy Watkins; Paul Wilson; Tracy Ackerman; Girl Thing
- Producer(s): Absolute

Girl Thing singles chronology
"Last One Standing" (2000)	"Girls on Top" (2000)

Music video
- "Girls on Top" on YouTube

Alternative cover
- UK CD 2 cover

"Girls on Top" is a song by English–Dutch girl group Girl Thing. It was released on 30 October 2000 in Australia and on 6 November 2000 in the United Kingdom as the second single from their self-titled debut studio album (2001). Despite previous single "Last One Standing" peaking at number eight on the UK Singles Chart, "Girls on Top" charted at number 25, resulting in the group being dropped by their record label and their album not being released in the UK.

== Charts ==
Chart (2000–2001)	Peak position
Australia (ARIA)	42
Europe (Eurochart Hot 100)	98
Netherlands (Single Top 100)	42
Norway (VG-lista)	13
Scotland (OCC)	24
UK Singles (OCC)	25

== Release history ==
Region	Date	Format(s)	Label(s)	Ref.
Australia	30 October 2000	CD	RCA	
United Kingdom	6 November 2000	CD; cassette	RCA	
