= I Can Make You Feel Good =

1982 single by Shalamar

Single by Shalamar

from the album Friends
- B-side: "Playing to Win"
- Released: 1982
- Length: 3:42
- Label: SOLAR
- Songwriters: William Shelby; Howard Hewett; Renwick Jackson
- Producer: Leon Sylvers III

Shalamar singles chronology
"Talk to Me" (1981)	"I Can Make You Feel Good" (1982)	"A Night to Remember" (1982)

Music video
- "I Can Make You Feel Good" on YouTube

"I Can Make You Feel Good" is a song by American R&B group Shalamar, released in 1982 as the lead single from their sixth studio album Friends. It reached No. 7 in the United Kingdom, making it their first top ten hit, followed by the singles "A Night to Remember" and "There It Is", which both peaked at No. 5.

== Charts ==
=== Weekly charts ===
Chart (1982)	Peak position
Ireland (IRMA)	18
Netherlands (Dutch Top 40)	8
Netherlands (Single Top 100)	10
UK Singles (Official Charts)	7
US Bubbling Under Hot 100 (Billboard)	2
US Hot Black Singles (Billboard)	33

=== Year-end charts ===
Chart (1982)	Position
UK Singles (OCC)	72

== Certifications ==
Region	Certification	Certified units/sales
United Kingdom (BPI)	Silver	200,000^{‡}
^{‡} Sales+streaming figures based on certification alone.

== Kavana version ==
"I Can Make You Feel Good"

Single by Kavana

from the album Kavana
- Released: December 30, 1996
- Length: 3:37
- Label: Nemesis; Virgin
- Songwriters: William Shelby; Howard Hewett; Renwick Jackson
- Producer: Absolute

Kavana singles chronology
"Where Are You" (1996)	"I Can Make You Feel Good" (1996)	"MFEO" (1997)

Audio
- "I Can Make You Feel Good" on YouTube

In 1996, English singer Kavana covered the song; his version reached No. 8 on the UK Singles Chart.

=== Charts ===
Chart (1997)	Peak position
Australia (ARIA)	32
Estonia Airplay (Eesti Top 15)	3
Europe (Eurochart Hot 100)	23
Germany (GfK)	71
Iceland (Íslenski Listinn Topp 40)	34
Israel (Israeli Singles Chart)	16
Italy Airplay (Music & Media)	11
Scottish Singles Sales (Official Charts)	9
UK Singles (Official Charts)	8
