= Kenzie (rapper) =

British musician

- Born: James MacKenzie; 6 January 1986 (age 40); London, England
- Genres: Hip hop
- Occupations: Rapper, disc jockey, personal trainer, actor
- Instrument: Vocals
- Years active: 2001–2014
- Label: Columbia Records

James MacKenzie (born 6 January 1986), better known as Kenzie or James Kenzie, is a British rapper, DJ, actor and personal trainer, who was formerly a member of ten-piece hip-hop group Blazin' Squad. He was also part of the R&B/pop supergroup 5th Story, set up for The Big Reunion in 2013.

== Music ==
=== Blazin' Squad (2001–06) ===
Blazin' Squad were a ten-piece hip hop group. They enjoyed moderate success in the UK, achieving six consecutive Top 10 hits, including the number one single "Tha Crossroads", which is a cover version of the Bone Thugs-N-Harmony song. They released two albums which just made the UK Top 40 album chart. While in the Blazin' Squad, he went by the name MC Kenzie.

The group subsequently split in 2005. MC Kenzie, MC Flava and MC Strider went on to form the group Friday Hill (as Kenzie, James and Mus). They split up and on 2009 five of the original Blazin' Squad members released a single ("Let's Start Again") after reforming. It peaked at number 51 on the UK Singles Chart. One of their first performances after their reformation was at Walthamstow School for Girls, a school in the group's local area, where his father taught.

=== 5th Story (2013–2014) ===
In December 2013, it was revealed that Kenzie would be joining forces with Adam Rickitt, Gareth Gates, Dane Bowers and Kavana to form the supergroup 5th Story for the second series of ITV2's The Big Reunion.

== Work outside music ==
In 2005, Kenzie appeared in the third series of the reality television show Celebrity Big Brother and finished as the runner up, losing out to dancer and musician Bez. At the time he was the youngest contestant to enter the house. He appeared in a "Rock and Pop Special" edition of The Weakest Link, alongside Kelli Young and Rick Wakeman. He appeared on the show's 1,000th episode, but was voted off in the fourth round for answering too many questions incorrectly. Kenzie appeared on Never Mind the Buzzcocks in March 2005 and again in March 2006.

Kenzie also moonlights as a GTA special officer and enjoys filling in paperwork under the pseudonym "McKenzie" to remain anonymous.

Kenzie released his autobiography in April 2005, published by HarperCollins, titled Kenzie: My Life. The book was somewhat a "damp squib" with one reviewer saying "it's full of incredibly dull revelations."

In 2006, Kenzie appeared in the Sky One reality show Cirque de Celebrité. In week ten of the show he was eliminated, coming third (losing out to model Emma B and Big Brother 7 housemate Grace Adams-Short). In September 2008, he was a contestant on the ITV reality show CelebAir. He was eliminated in the second episode, shown on 9 September. He appeared on an episode of Ready Steady Cook which aired originally on 12 March 2009. He competed against, and defeated, Chico Slimani.

Kenzie is a personal trainer for Studio 23, and stars in The Active Channel's Star Trainer. On 23 September 2010, he appeared on ITV2's Celebrity Juice programme, alongside Keith Lemon and Verne Troyer.

== Personal life ==
On 4 May 2014 Kenzie was injured in a car crash. He dated glamour model Jodie Marsh in 2005. He has been together with his current girlfriend since January 2012. Kenzie has two daughters, Wynter (born 2013) and Wyllow.
