= Everybody (Hear'Say song) =

2001 single by Hear'Say

Single by Hear'Say

from the album Everybody
- B-side: "Once in a Lifetime"; "The Way I'm Feeling Tonight"; "I Knew You Were Waiting"
- Released: 26 November 2001
- Recorded: 2001
- Studio: Biffco (Dublin, Ireland)
- Genre: Pop
- Length: 3:54
- Label: Polydor
- Songwriters: Martin Harrington; Ash Howes; Richard Stannard; Julian Gallagher; Andy Caine
- Producers: Ash Howes; Martin Harrington

Hear'Say singles chronology
"The Way to Your Love" (2001)	"Everybody" (2001)	"Lovin' Is Easy" (2002)

Audio video
- "Everybody" on YouTube

"Everybody" is a song by British pop group Hear'Say, written by Martin Harrington, Ash Howes, Richard Stannard, Julian Gallagher, and Andy Caine. Produced by Harrington and Howes, the track was recorded for the group's second studio album, Everybody (2001), which was released nine months after their debut album, Popstars. "Everybody" was issued as the album's lead single on 26 November 2001 and was the final single released by the band before member Kym Marsh quit. Upon its release, the song peaked at number four on the UK Singles Chart. The song's music video is set inside a space capsule and shows the five band members dancing on a stage.

== Background and release ==
When Hear'Say's second single, "The Way to Your Love", debuted at number one on the UK Singles Chart, it sold 75,514 copies during its first week of release, considerably less the first-day total of 160,000 copies for the band's debut single, "Pure and Simple". The group's label, Polydor Records, concluded that the public was losing interest in the band following their Popstars formation and decided to rush the quintet into the studio to record a second album rather than release another single from the Popstars album. For this song, the two male members, Noel Sullivan and Danny Foster, sing lead vocals. "Everybody" was serviced to UK radio in October 2001 and was released as a single on 26 November 2001 across three formats: two CD singles and a cassette single.

== Reception and aftermath ==
Following the song's release, music critics began to speculate how much longer Hear'Say would remain together. Can't Stop the Pop wrote that "Everybody" is a catchy song, comparing it to "Keep On Movin'" by Five, but criticised the track for lacking the R&B influences of the group's earlier songs. British columnist James Masterton also likened the song to "Keep On Movin'", noting its harmonies and "singalong" chorus but writing that the band's charm was starting to diminish. Music Week called the track "pop-by-numbers" and wrote that the track would leave the charts immediately after appearing. The song stayed on the UK Singles Chart for 11 weeks, debuting and peaking at number four on 2 December 2001. The single also charted in Ireland, reaching number 23.

Two months after the song's release, Kym Marsh quit the band by announcing her departure through a newspaper, citing disputes with bandmate Myleene Klass. Marsh was replaced by Johnny Shentall from pop group Boom!, and the band released their final single, "Lovin' Is Easy", in August 2002, which peaked at number six on the UK Singles Chart. Afterwards, plans to record the group's third studio album were cancelled, and in October 2002, the group disbanded.

== Track listings ==
UK CD1

1. "Everybody" (single edit)
2. "Once in a Lifetime"
3. "The Way I'm Feeling Tonight"
4. "Everybody" (video CD-ROM)

UK CD2

1. "Everybody" (single edit)
2. "I Knew You Were Waiting"
3. "Everybody" (Almighty mix)

UK cassette single

1. "Everybody" (single edit)
2. "I Knew You Were Waiting"

== Credits and personnel ==
Credits are taken from the UK CD1 liner notes.

Studios

- Recorded and mixed at Biffco Studios (Dublin, Ireland)
- Edited at 777 Productions (London, England)
- Mastered at Transfermation (London, England)

Personnel

- Martin Harrington – writing, all instruments, production
- Ash Howes – writing, all instruments, production, mixing
- Richard Stannard – writing
- Julian Gallagher – writing
- Andy Caine – writing, additional guitars
- Sharon Murphy – backing vocals
- Alvin Sweeney – additional recording
- Jeremy – editing
- Richard Dowling – mastering

== Charts ==
=== Weekly charts ===
Chart (2001)	Peak position
Europe (Eurochart Hot 100)	21
Ireland (IRMA)	23
Scotland Singles (OCC)	2
UK Singles (OCC)	4
UK Airplay (Music Week)	23

=== Year-end charts ===
Chart (2001)	Position
UK Singles (OCC)	120
