= Everybody (Hear'Say album) =

Studio album by Hear'Say
- Released: 3 December 2001
- Recorded: 2000–2001
- Genre: Pop
- Length: 52:50
- Label: Polydor
- Producer: Martin Harrington; Ash Howes; Jiant; Cathy Dennis; Oskar Paul; Stargate; True North; Ray Hedges; Steelworks

Hear'Say chronology
Popstars (2001)	Everybody (2001)

Singles from Everybody
- 1. "Everybody" Released: 26 November 2001

Everybody is the second and final album by British pop group Hear'Say, formed through the ITV television show Popstars. It was released in the United Kingdom on 3 December 2001. The album peaked at No. 24 on the UK Albums Chart and spent five weeks in the Top 75 chart.

While the majority of the tracks were recorded while the group were on tour, "Not the End of the World" was originally a leftover track from the recording sessions for their debut album, Popstars, while a remix of their debut single "Pure and Simple" was included as a bonus track at the end of the album.

== Track listing ==
No.	Title	Writer(s)	Producer(s)	Length
1.	"Everybody"	Andy Caine; Julian Gallagher; Martin Harrington; Ash Howes; Richard Stannard	Howes; Harrington	3:54
2.	"Suddenly"	Cathy Dennis; Oskar Paul	Paul	4:03
3.	"We Go On"	Mikkel S. Eriksen; Tor Erik Hermansen; Hallgeir Rustan	Stargate	2:50
4.	"Back Down to Zero"	Steve Robson; Liz Winstanley	Jiant	3:24
5.	"Play to Win"	Eriksen; Hermasen; Rustan	Stargate	3:46
6.	"Angel in My Heart"	Danny Foster; Eliot Kennedy; Myleene Klass; Kym Marsh; Suzanne Shaw; Noel Sullivan; Tim Woodcock	True North	3:47
7.	"You're All I Need to Get By"	Nickolas Ashford; Valerie Simpson	Ray Hedges	2:52
8.	"Not the End of the World"	Mark Cawley; Kennedy; Tim Lever; Mike Percy; Woodcock	Steelworks	3:40
9.	"Don't Go Believing"	Nigel Butler; Foster; Klass; Hedges; Marsh; Shaw; Sullivan	Hedges	3:16
10.	"Home Again"	Simon Ellis; Dennis	Dennis; Paul	3:45
11.	"A Good Thing"	Nigel Butler; Foster; Klass; Hedges; Marsh; Shaw; Sullivan	Hedges	3:26
12.	"Straight from the Heart"	Tim Hawes; Pete Kirtley; Tracy Ackerman	Jiant	4:00
13.	"Pure and Simple" (new version)	Alison Clarkson; Hawes; Pete Kirtley	Jiant	3:51

== Charts ==
Chart performance for Everybody
Chart (2001)	Peak position
Scottish Albums (OCC)	23
UK Albums (OCC)	24
