= Popstars (Hear'Say album) =

Studio album by Hear'Say
- Released: 26 March 2001
- Recorded: November 2000—February 2001
- Genre: Pop
- Length: 52:50
- Label: Polydor
- Producers: Jiant; Ray Hedges; Yoyo Olugbo; The Boo-Dan; Stargate; Quiz & Larossi; Sugargang; John Holliday; Trevor Steel

Hear'Say chronology
Popstars (2001)	Everybody (2001)

Singles from Popstars
- 1. "Pure and Simple" Released: 12 March 2001; 2. "The Way to Your Love" Released: 25 June 2001

Popstars is the debut album by British pop group Hear'Say, formed through the ITV television show Popstars. It was released in the United Kingdom on 26 March 2001. Hear'Say worked with a number of British and Scandinavian producers, including Stargate, and Quiz & Larossi. The album drew comparisons to similarly co-ed pop groups such as S Club 7 and Steps.

The album received generally negative reviews from contemporary music critics, who commented on the artificiality and genericness of both Hear'Say and their music. However, Popstars was a commercial success, charting at number one in the United Kingdom. It was the fastest-selling debut album in UK chart history at the time of release, selling over 300,000 copies in its first week. Popstars yielded two number one singles, "Pure and Simple" and "The Way to Your Love".

== Background ==
Hear'Say were formed by the ITV reality television programme Popstars in November 2000, and the series began airing on 10 January 2001. Nigel Lythgoe, Paul Adam, and Nicki Chapman selected the five chosen singers — Danny Foster, Myleene Klass, Kym Marsh, Suzanne Shaw, and Noel Sullivan — out of thousands of hopeful singers. The programme documented Hear'Say recording and promoting their first single with the series ending on the night the single charted in the UK Singles Chart.

After their formation, Hear'Say flew to Trondheim, Norway to record their debut album. The group worked with Stargate, who had previously produced singles for Billie Piper and S Club 7. Hear'Say also worked with Tim Hawes and Pete Kirtley, who produced under the name Jiant. The album drew comparisons to Steps and S Club 7, two other co-ed British pop groups popular in the late 1990s and early 2000s. While maintaining an overarching pop sound, the album has disco, Motown, and R&B influences. The producers "bring in echoes of Jam and Lewis, a splash of ABBA, even a touch of Prince." Comparisons to the work of Stock Aitken Waterman were also noted. The album features a number of ballads towards the end.

The album's opening track is lead single "Pure and Simple", co-written by Betty Boo and originally recorded by Girl Thing. The song was co-written by Hawes, Kirtley, and Alison Clarkson, better known under the alias Betty Boo. "Pure and Simple" was inspired by and compared to 1990s girl group All Saints, receiving comparisons to their breakthrough single "Never Ever". "The Way to Your Love," produced by Stargate, was described as "very Steps-like." "Another Lover" has an "R'n'B feel." "One Step Closer" credits band members Danny Foster and Kym Marsh as co-writers. "Make It Happen" has a "disco style." The song credits Myleene Klass, Suzanne Shaw, and Noel Sullivan as co-writers. The final two tracks on the album are covers of "Monday, Monday" by The Mamas & the Papas and "Bridge Over Troubled Water" by Simon & Garfunkel. Both songs were performed on Popstars during the auditions stage.

== Critical reception ==
Music critics gave generally negative reviews to Popstars, noting the artificiality and genericness of both the band and the music. Ian Youngs of the BBC suggested that "apart from a few modern beats in the background, this album could have been recorded at any time in the last four decades by any photogenic, teen-aimed group who are in it more for the stardom than the musical credibility." Youngs continued, "Musically, it is unadventurous factory-farmed fodder - which is obviously what they wanted. Something sweet, sticky and safe." In another review for the BBC, Natalie Cassidy gave the album a "thumb ups," commenting that it "never tries to be too complicated or pretentious." However, Cassidy commented that "this is not a greatly original album - there are echoes of the Steps/S Club 7 vibe and sometimes you are not sure whether you are listening to the same song or the next one." The Daily Telegraph was the most positive, writing, "As it is, of its kind, it's a rather decent record." The Guardian unfavorably compared the album to Stock Aitken Waterman, suggesting that Hear'Say were stuck in the late 1980s. The Independent wrote, "Heaven knows, there's precious little musical interest to be found on the quintet's debut album." The Times remarked, "As soon as the album ends, you'd still be hard pushed to remember how more than three of the songs sound. The real question is, how much do you care?" entertainment.ie gave the song just two out of five stars.

== Commercial performance ==
Popstars charted at number one on the UK Albums Chart. Having sold 306,631 copies in its first week, the album broke the record for fastest-selling debut album in UK chart history at the time of release.

== Track listing ==
No.	Title	Writer(s)	Producer(s)	Length
1.	"Pure and Simple"	Alison Clarkson; Tim Hawes; Pete Kirtley	Jiant	3:48
2.	"The Way to Your Love"	Mikkel S. Eriksen; Tor Erik Hermasen; Hallgeir Rustan	Stargate	3:15
3.	"One Step Closer"	Nigel Butler; Danny Foster; Kym Marsh; Ray Hedges	Hedges	3:33
4.	"Another Lover"	Henry Binns; Yoyo Olugbo	The Boo-Dan	3:47
5.	"One"	Eriksen; Hermasen; Rustan	Stargate	2:46
6.	"Not the Kind"	Eriksen; Hermasen; Rustan	Stargate	3:58
7.	"Make It Happen"	Butler; Hedges; Mylene Klass; Suzanne Shaw; Noel Sullivan	Hedges	3:43
8.	"Breathe"	Eriksen; Hermasen; Rustan	Stargate	3:35
9.	"Carried Away"	Tracy Ackerman; Martin Brannigan; Hedges	Hedges	3:40
10.	"Sweet Alibi"	Ackerman; Butler; Hedges	Hedges	3:17
11.	"I Didn't Want You Anyway"	Josef Larossi; Rick Mitra; Andreas Romdhane	Quiz & Larossi	3.00
12.	"Colourblind"	Steve Lee; Avril Mackintosh; Wayne Wilkins	Sugargang	3:41
13.	"Love Will Never End"	Hermasen; Rustan	Stargate	3:28
14.	"Monday, Monday"	John Phillips	Jiant	2:30
15.	"Bridge Over Troubled Water"	Paul Simon	John Holliday; Trevor Steel	4:49

== Charts and certifications ==
=== Weekly charts ===
Chart (2001)	Peak position
Irish Albums (IRMA)	4
New Zealand Albums (RMNZ)	1
Scottish Albums (Official Charts)	1
UK Albums (Official Charts)	1

=== Year-end charts ===
Chart (2001)	Position
UK Albums (OCC)	14

=== Certifications ===
Region	Certification	Certified units/sales
New Zealand (RMNZ)	Platinum	15,000^{^}
United Kingdom (BPI)	3× Platinum	900,000^{^}
^{^} Shipments figures based on certification alone.

== Personnel ==
- Chris Hilton – artwork
- Michael Labica – artwork
- Richard Dowling – mastering
- Sandrine Dulermo – photography
