= All Dressed Up =

All Dressed Up may refer to:

- All Dressed Up (film), a 1918 silent film short
- All Dressed Up (song), a 2015 song by Lauren Harries
- All Dressed Up, a song by John Entwistle from the album Whistle Rymes
- All Dressed Up, a song by Raye from the album Euphoric Sad Songs
