= Suzanne Shaw =

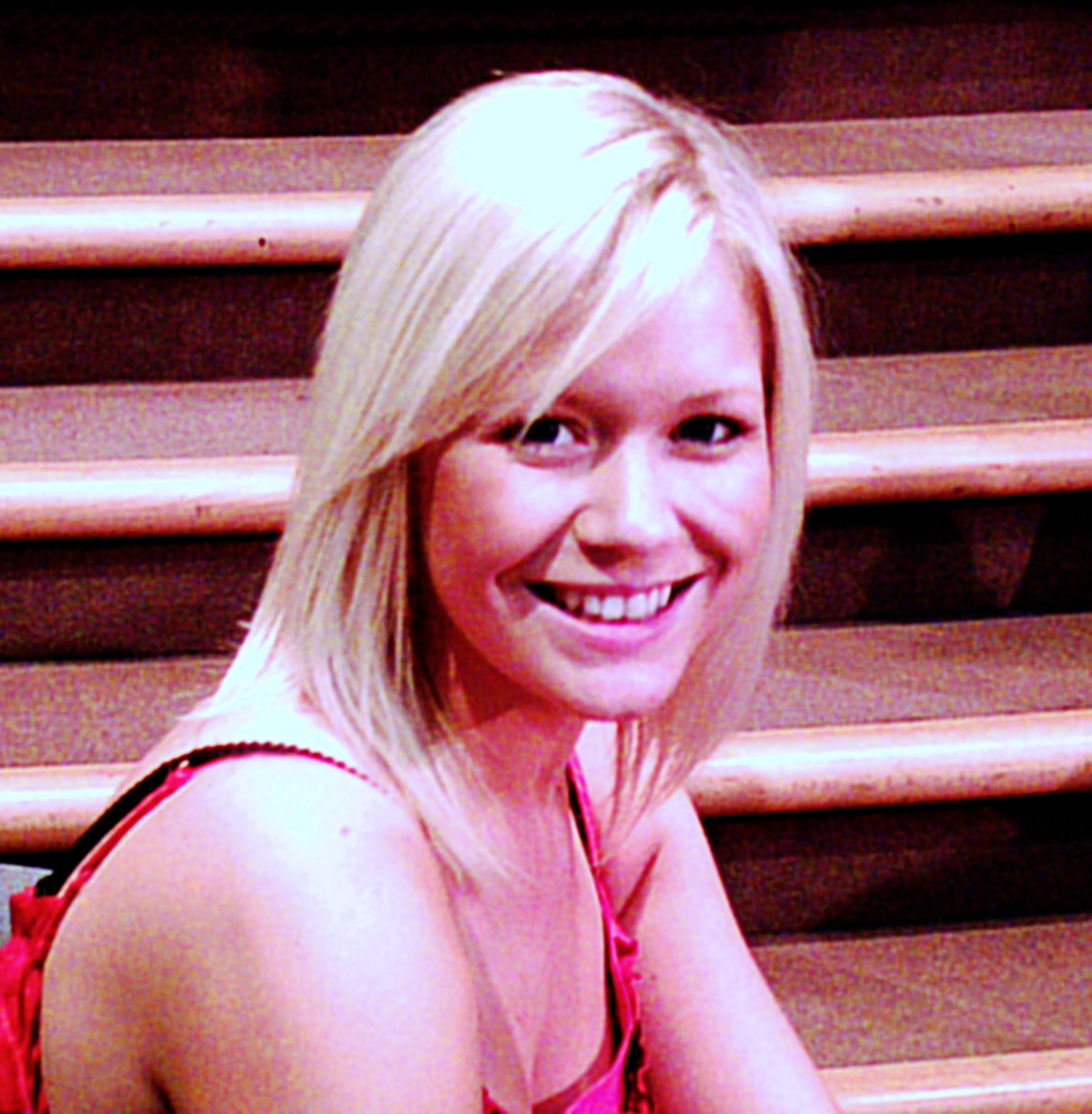
- Shaw in 2007
- Born: Suzanne Christine Crowshaw; 29 September 1981 (age 45); Bury, Greater Manchester, England
- Education: St. Mary's Primary School, Radcliffe. St. Gabriel’s RC High School, Bury.
- Alma mater: St. Gabriel's R.C. High School
- Occupations: Singer; actress; television presenter; media personality; musical theatre performer; dancer; writer
- Years active: 2000–present
- Height: 5 ft 2 in (157 cm)
- Spouse: Jason King (m. 2009; sep. 2012)
- Children: 2
- Awards: Celebrity Mum of the Year 2008
- Musical career
- Genres: Pop; dance
- Years active: 2000–2002; 2006; 2026–present
- Labels: MCA Music; Island; Cordless Recordings; Polydor
- Member of: Hear'Say

Suzanne Christine Crowshaw (born 29 September 1981), known as Suzanne Shaw, is an English actress, singer and television personality, who rose to fame after winning the talent contest Popstars and subsequently being a member of the pop group Hear'Say.

Shaw is now an established musical theatre and West End performer, actress, model and television presenter in her own right. She won the third series of the ITV skating show Dancing on Ice in 2008 and participated in the All Stars series in 2014.

Shaw played the character of Eve Jenson in the soap opera Emmerdale.

== Early life ==
At the age of two, Shaw started ballet and tap classes at the Janet Lomas School of Dancing in Bury. While training at the school, she took exams in ballet, tap and modern. She also performed in annual shows and competed successfully in dance festivals and competitions across the North West.

At five years of age, Shaw performed in her first amateur dramatics show, Annie. Shaw developed a love for theatre, performing in various amateur dramatic productions, including The Sound of Music and a West End production of Showboat at the age of nine. Shaw went on to train at Freelance Dance School and later became a member of an ABBA tribute band, The Right Stuff, and appeared in television roles including an Esso advertisement, Holby City, and a BBC production, Elidor. She also tried for the part of Maria Sutherland in Coronation Street, and made it to the final three along with Girls Aloud member Kimberley Walsh, but lost out to Samia Smith.

Shaw also developed her musical abilities, learning the recorder and violin, at St. Mary's primary school and later the saxophone at St. Gabriel's R.C. High School. After leaving school, she attended Oldham College.

== Music career ==
Shaw's break came in 2000 when the ITV show Popstars launched a competition for contestants to become part of a newly formed pop group. Shaw had just turned 18, and attended the auditions and successfully made it through several elimination rounds. She was chosen as one of the ten finalists and became one of the members of Hear'Say, along with Kym Marsh, Myleene Klass, Noel Sullivan and Danny Foster, having beaten 4,000 other hopefuls.

Their debut single "Pure and Simple" was the fastest selling non-charitable record ever in the UK, selling 1.3 million copies. Their first album, Popstars, went on to sell 1.2 million copies in the UK, followed by their own television show entitled Hear'say It's Saturday, performing with established artists such as Lionel Richie, Joe Pasquale, Bradley Walsh, Blue and Atomic Kitten. Subsequently, the group achieved a sell-out arena tour and performed numerous television guest appearances. They released their second album Everybody for the Christmas market in 2001.

Shaw made many appearances with the group on TV and in live performance venues, including Hear'Say: A New Chapter in Full, The Hear'Say Story, Hear'Say It's Saturday! and the Royal Variety Performance for television. Hear'Say had two number one singles, a number four single and a number six single in the British charts as well as many awards and accolades, before splitting in 2002.

Shaw recorded a song entitled "Calling" for dance duo Koishii & Hush which was a hit in dance charts both in the UK and the US. She also co-wrote several tracks for Hear'Say, one of which was also recorded by and featured on the second album of American pop group Jump5.

On 1 October 2026, precisely 24 years after Hear'Say's split, the group teased a reunion with four of the original members: Foster, Marsh, Shaw and Sullivan. On 8 October, the group announced that they would be embarking on a joint arena tour with Liberty X, Popstars: The Originals, in April and May 2027.

== Acting career ==
In 2003, Shaw was cast in a role in the remake of the Summer Holiday musical in London's West End, and later in a UK tour of the show starring alongside Darren Day and Christopher Biggins. Despite initial scepticism about the part going to a popstar, Shaw received huge praise for the role such as from the British Theatre Guide which stated "And those who, like me, only know Suzanne Shaw (Bobby) as part of the manufactured pop group Hear'Say, had their eyes opened. She was a dancer, singer and actress long before Popstars, and it shows". and Nowt2do.com stating "Suzanne Shaw no doubt had the most to prove as Barbara, having come from Hear'Say but she has wowed this critic over. She light up the stage with her stunning smile and had the most powerful voice. It's hard to think that she was in Hear'Say when she was strutting her stuff with such professionalism that you would think she has been in West End Musicals for years. A real killer and big voice mixed with some superb dancing skills showed that Suzanne was the pure and simple choice for the role...sorry couldn't resist!".

In February 2005, Shaw took on the role of narrator in Joseph and the Amazing Technicolor Dreamcoat, also in the West End. The leading role in Snow White followed, and then as Janet in The Rocky Horror Show national tour, appearing twice on Londons West End. Shaw once again received rave reviews for her role from fans of the show, critics as well as creator Richard O' Brien. The Stage commented that Shaw was "a delectably wide-eyed Janet", with Critic Chris High stating "Shaw is delightful as the naive Janet and proves she has far more to offer than anything a reality TV show could ever uncover" and the British Theatre guide stating "A big surprise to me was how outstanding former Hear'Say popstar Suzanne Shaw was: she is so at home on stage with strong voice and fabulous presence".

In 2008, Shaw joined the West End cast of Chicago, playing the role of Roxie Hart. Shaw received a nomination for best takeover in the prestigious whatsonstage theatregoers choice awards for her performance of the role.

Shaw toured in The Vagina Monologues throughout the summer of 2009 alongside actresses such as Jessie Wallace, Wendi Peters and Sue Holderness. This is the second time Shaw has appeared in the production; her previous appearance was in Brighton in 2007.

Shaw starred as Judy Haynes alongside Aled Jones, Adam Cooper and Roy Dotrice in the musical White Christmas at the Lowry arts centre in Salford from November 2009 to January 2010. She received very positive reviews for the role from, for example, The Stage, which commented "The beautiful Haynes Sisters are delightfully played by Suzanne Shaw as Judy, who sings and dances with ease with talented Rachel Stanley as her sister Betty", The Lancashire Evening Post which stated "Former Hearsay star, Suzanne Shaw is a revelation, dancing, singing and acting with seasoned aplomb". and the Flintshire Chronicle which said "The show played to the actors' strengths so (Aled) Jones and (Rachel) Stanley took the big songs and (Adam) Cooper and (Suzanne) Shaw the dazzling dance routines. The former were in good voice and it was well worth the trip to Salford just to see the sublime I Love a Piano tap routine by a flying Cooper and Shaw".

Shaw's other acting roles have included The Court for Channel 4 and a guest appearance on the British television police procedural The Bill, broadcast on ITV1 in June 2007, playing the character of Laura Matthews. She also appeared in the reality television programmes Have I Been Here Before? and Britain's Worst Celebrity Driver. In 2007, Shaw competed in a reality TV show named The Baron, which featured Shaw, Sex Pistols manager Malcolm McLaren and Mike Reid competing for a vacant Baronial title in a small Scottish town called Gardenstown, near Banff in Aberdeenshire. Shaw finished as runner-up, losing to Reid. The show was due to air in autumn 2007, but following Reid's death in July of that year, it was postponed until April 2008.

From 2 April 2010, Shaw appeared as Eve Birch (originally played by Raine Davison), the granddaughter of longstanding character Edna Birch, in the British ITV1 soap Emmerdale. In April 2011 it was announced that Shaw quit Emmerdale, with her character later leaving onscreen in August 2011.

In 2012, Shaw toured in Funny Peculiar with Vicky Entwistle, Craig Gazey, Dominic Cazenove and Gemma Bissix. In December 2013, Shaw performed the title role of Cinderella, at the Bristol Hippodrome. In December 2021, Shaw played Belle in Beauty and the Beast at Chesterfield's Pomegranate Theatre.

== Television presenting and media ventures ==
Shaw has been a panellist for Loose Women on ITV1, and presented a live gameshow Bingolotto on Virgin 1 and Challenge every Friday night. Shaw has been the face and body of the Michelle for George Ultimo range at Asda. In 2008, Shaw wrote a weekly column for Woman Magazine which has a circulation of over 370,000 each week.

Shaw is also worked an ambassador of Mattel and the deal with Shaw is the first time that Mattel and Barbie DVD distributor Entertainment Rights have undertaken together. Shaw lent her vocals to the theme tune "Connected" from 2008's "Barbie(TM) and the Diamond Castle" children's movie. Shaw has brought out a successful perfume "Ice" and interactive family DVD "Suzanne Shaw's Showtime Showdown". She was also the face of Tesco Mobile as well as Disney for which she has launched the interactive games "Disney's Sing It" and "Disney's A Christmas Carol".

== Dancing on Ice ==
In 2008, Shaw won series 3 of the popular ITV show Dancing on Ice, performing technical footwork and solo skating skills as well as many lifts and tricks with her partner Matt Evers, the "Headbanger" being her most best-known of the series (recreated with the twister in her final performance). Bonnie Langford was the first celebrity to perform the 'Headbanger' move in series 1, albeit from a lying position. Shaw is the only celebrity ever to do the Headbanger from a standing takeoff position, which is more difficult and more dangerous. Shaw also remains the only female celebrity to do the twister in the headbanger, the splits lift, the ballet lift, the walk over, a 3 jump, the famous Torvill and Dean overhead flip and cartwheel and a full death spiral amongst other moves.

On 1 March 2008, it was confirmed that she had chipped a bone in her ankle during training and there were doubts as to whether she would be able to continue in the competition. Having previously received a gash to the head and a broken rib, this did not deter her, and she vowed to carry on for her dance partner and the people who had voted for her. On 2 March, she skated with her ankle strapped and finished second from bottom on the leader board with a total of 24; however, the public saved her from the skate-off.

On 9 March, she skated in the semi-final of Dancing on Ice and again achieved the highest score of the series so far with 27.5 (it also being the score of her "Music" routine) to the song "Eternal Flame". Christopher Dean stated that he was hugely impressed with her skating and performance, saying she could do both fast and slower numbers equally well and was exceptionally versatile. He also revealed that Shaw was very good at improvising as she forgot some of the steps at the start of the routine.

On 16 March, Shaw was named the Series 3 Dancing on Ice champion, after Phillip Schofield announced she had won the public vote. She skated three times during the series finale, scoring a flawless five sixes with the judges in two of her routines. No contestant on Dancing on Ice had ever received five sixes before. She then went on to win the show by getting the majority of the public votes.

She also took part in related competitions, including the Tour and Christmas Special with Team Torvill. In the Christmas special Shaw again received the maximum score of 30 for her performance of the Santa Baby effectively winning the show for team Torvill. She still holds the record for being the only celebrity to have 3 perfect scores in a row.

Shaw took part in her second Dancing on Ice tour in April despite having to adjust to a new partner. Christopher Dean praised Shaw stating that she had "done wonders" despite less than 3 weeks training with her new partner prior to the tour. Shaw also received high praise from the judges as well as Torvill and Dean for being "an absolute professional" regarding the change of partners.

== Personal life ==
Shaw gave birth to her first child, a boy named Corey MacKenzie Shaw-Day, on 16 December 2004. Corey's father is actor and singer Darren Day.

Shaw started a relationship with DJ and television presenter Jason King. The couple had been friends since Shaw's Hear'Say days, but began dating in December 2005 after appearing together on Britain's Worst Celebrity Driver. They lived with Shaw's son in Oxenhope, Yorkshire. They announced their engagement in August 2008 and married in Christchurch, Dorset, in June 2009. On 13 February 2012, it was announced that the couple had separated.

In 2008, Shaw was voted Celebrity Mother of the Year by the public. Following her marriage Shaw took some time off to support her new husband and to dedicate herself to family life. Shaw also said that she prefers quiet family life and goes out of her way to avoid the press and a showbiz lifestyle.

On 4 March 2015, Shaw announced that she was expecting a second child, with fiancé Sam Greenfield. Shaw gave birth to a boy on 6 October 2015 whom she named Rafferty. Shaw and Greenfield separated in January 2026.

On 26 March 2026, Shaw became a grandmother when son Corey's partner Erin, gave birth to a baby boy.
