= Little Lady Fauntleroy =

British television documentary

- Genre: Television documentary
- Presented by: Keith Allen
- Starring: Lauren Harries; Adam Harries; Kaye Harries; Mark Harries; Patrick Harries
- Original language: English

Production
- Executive producers: Victor Lewis-Smith; Graham Pass
- Producer: Ned Parker
- Running time: 60 minutes (inc. adverts)
- Production company: Associated-Rediffusion

Original release
- Network: Channel 4
- Release: 28 June 2004

Little Lady Fauntleroy is a British television documentary fronted by Keith Allen and starring Lauren Harries and her family. The special aired on 28 June 2004 on Channel 4. It featured Allen visiting the Harries family and conducting interviews with them, as well as following their every day life and investigating some of their claims. Sam Wollaston of The Guardian found the documentary "desperately tragic" but "utterly mesmerising".

== Production ==
The documentary starred Lauren Harries, a television personality who came to prominence as a child in the 1980s for her knowledge of antiques and subsequent appearances on shows such as Wogan and After Dark in which she demonstrated said knowledge. It also featured her mother Kaye and father Mark, as well as her brothers, Adam and Patrick. Harries subsequently underwent gender reassignment surgery in 2001. The documentary was fronted by actor and musician Keith Allen, who visited the Harries family at their home in Rumney, Cardiff, and interviewed them about Harries' childhood, her transition and their lives, aiming to verify some of their claims. Allen mocked the family throughout, with the documentary aiming to paint them in a negative light. However, Allen ultimately made several discoveries about their false claims. The title was based on the novel Little Lord Fauntleroy. It was produced by Associated-Rediffusion and aired on 28 June 2004 on Channel 4, later being released on DVD in July 2005.

== Content ==
The documentary begins with archive footage of Lauren Harries as child appearing on several television shows including Terry Wogan's programmes and pictures of newspaper clippings featuring her. Keith Allen narrates over the footage and tells the family backstory, including Lauren's father Mark's attempt to sue the government for mismanaging the country's affairs and ultimately being sent to prison for fraud involving setting fire to his fancy dress shop. A clip of Wogan asking Harries "If this is what you're like aged 10, what are you going to be like when you're 20". The screen then cuts to an adult Lauren, accompanied by eerie organ music, which is featured throughout the documentary. Keith subsequently meets the Harries family at their house. Lauren's family tell how they first believed Lauren to be homosexual, before realising she was a transgender woman. Lauren reveals the details of her transition and how she believes she possesses a gift for being on television, detailing her early life and career. Footage is shown of Lauren singing karaoke at a local bar. Keith tells how experts had said Lauren's knowledge of antiques was exaggerated, with the family admitting the same. Lauren and Keith visit an antiques shop where Lauren makes several estimates on items which are confirmed to be well off the actual price, and Lauren ultimately rides a rocking horse.

The family discuss the abuse they have received from people in the neighbourhood, as well as the transphobic comments Lauren has received. Keith investigates the family's claims of being Doctors of Metaphysics, as well as Lauren having an MA in Dramaturgy. They tell how they have worked as private detectives and offered counselling. Keith reveals that following an investigation, they discovered their qualifications were attained from the "Cardiff College of Humanistic Studies", which was located at their own house. Keith asks the family about Lauren's transition, and how they said Lauren's mother Kaye was her counsellor, under the alias "Lesley Stewart", while footage from Lauren's gender reassignment surgery two years earlier sees her refer to her mother and Lesley as two different people. Lauren subsequently gives Keith a counselling session, which he makes a mockery of, with Lauren concluding that he is insecure and discusses sex too much.

The family talk about the problems they have had with the neighbours, having been accused of snobbery, with their house situated next to a council estate. Lauren is seen out shopping for clothes and trying on outfits. Lauren's brother Patrick tells how he left school at 11, a decision taken by his parents and he and Kaye tell how they don't have contact with other family members. Lauren discusses with Keith how people thought she was the second coming as a child, whilst the family discuss their spirituality and Adam's attempts at astral projection. The family watch further footage of Lauren, and she discusses her love of television and desire to do more, with footage shown of her appearance on The Salon and her application video for Big Brother. She talks about performing and sings "Memory" from Cats in the kitchen alongside her mother, before detailing a recent dating experience. Lauren invites Keith to observe an acting class she is running, in which she demonstrates an improvisation session with her student where she plays the role of an angry mother arguing with her child, ultimately turning method and throwing Keith out of the room. The final scene sees Keith sitting down with the Harries family for lunch in a restaurant. After Lauren delivers a speech about her love for her mother, she goes and sits at another table, after which Keith confronts the family and reveals the information he has uncovered, accusing them of purchasing their doctorates and lying about their qualifications, branding them fraudsters. Kaye claims they are qualified because of their life experience. Keith also accuses the family of recording the production team using tapes in their house during filming. An argument ensues with Keith ultimately losing his temper and storming out of the restaurant, admitting that he made himself look worse than the Harries family, later noting that they are fascinated by television and that television is equally fascinated by them.

== Reception ==
Sam Wollaston of The Guardian described the Harries family as "an unusual lot" and said that although the documentary was "desperately tragic", he found it "utterly mesmerising". Kathryn Flett of the same publication described the documentary as the "stuff of nightmares", noting that despite the family being "oddities", they "couldn't quite keep up with the freak sideshow that was Keith Allen, about whom we learned more than was either necessary or desirable."
