= Eve Jenson =

Fictional character from Emmerdale

- Emmerdale character
- Suzanne Shaw as Eve Jenson (2010)
- Portrayed by: Raine Davison (2001–2006); Suzanne Shaw (2010–2011)
- Duration: 2001–2002, 2006, 2010–2011
- First appearance: 31 August 2001
- Last appearance: 2 August 2011
- Created by: Steve Frost
- Introduced by: Steve Frost (2001); Kathleen Beedles (2006); Gavin Blyth (2010)
- Raine Davison as Eve Jenson (2001)
In-universe information
- Other names: Eve Birch
- Occupation: Personal Assistant (2010–11)
- Father: Peter Birch
- Stepmother: Jaqueline Birch
- Husband: James Jenson (2006–2010)
- Grandfathers: Joe Scarlet; Harold Birch (adoptive)
- Grandmothers: Lily Butterfield; Edna Birch (adoptive)
- Aunts: Paula
- Other relatives: Mildred Finch; Harriet Finch

Eve Jenson (also Birch) is a fictional character from the British ITV soap opera Emmerdale, played by Suzanne Shaw. She made her first on-screen appearance on 31 August 2001. The character was originally played by Raine Davison from 2001 to 2002, reappearing briefly in 2006. In early 2010, series producer Gavin Blyth recast the role and Shaw took over. Eve was introduced as the granddaughter of Edna Birch (Shirley Stelfox). In April 2011, it was announced that Shaw had quit her role of Eve and she departed on 2 August 2011.

== Casting ==
On 10 July 2001, Rick Fulton of the Daily Record reported that seventeen-year-old actress Davison had joined the cast as Eve alongside Sammy Winward, who plays Katie Sugden. Fulton said the girls would "set pulses racing among Emmerdale's teenage bratpack." Davison was introduced as the rebellious granddaughter of established character, Edna Birch (Shirley Stelfox). Of joining Emmerdale, Davison said "Imagine how I felt when I won a part in my favourite soap. Eve is a strong-willed girl and is a part I can really get my teeth into." A show spokesman said Davison and Winward were launched together to show viewers that they have strong teenage storylines for their teenage following. Davison made her debut screen appearance as Eve on 31 August 2001. She remained a series regular until her departure in 2002. Davison returned to the show for three episodes in October 2006, when Edna attended Eve's wedding to James Jenson (Ben Peyton).

=== Recast ===
In January 2010, it was announced that Eve would be returning to the show after a nearly four-year absence with a new actress in the role. Series producer Gavin Blyth stated in an interview with Digital Spy that he auditioned 50 to 60 actresses for the role, one of them being former Hear'Say singer and West End theatre star Suzanne Shaw who made the trip to Yorkshire from Manchester where she was playing Judy Haynes in the musical White Christmas. The decision to cast Shaw was announced on 29 January. Shaw signed a year-long contract and debuted on 2 April 2010.

Suzanne Shaw has described Eve as "feisty and very flirtatious. She's been left with a lot of debt in France and she turns up in the Dales because she has nowhere else to go – she knows that Edna's a real soft touch and wouldn't leave her own family at the front door. Eve does lie to start with because she doesn't want anyone to know why she's actually there – she doesn't want to let everyone know that she's failed again. Edna finds out the truth, though, and demands to know why she lied. Because she's going through a break-up, she deals with it by flirting with the men of the village. She finds it easier to get on with guys than girls – she's quite sarcastic and to-the-point."

Discussing the audition proses Shaw said "I got asked before Christmas to audition for the part of Eve. I was asked to do a screen test, but it got snowed off because of all the bad weather over Christmas. I didn't hear anything for ages and I thought it wasn't going to happen, and then just a few weeks before I started filming they offered me the part. It was a lovely surprise. They auditioned quite a lot of actresses for the role. I was up against some strong contenders so it was quite nerve-wracking when I went in, but Gavin Blyth, the producer, was so lovely and made me feel really at ease."

== Character development ==
=== Affair with Carl King ===
In 2010, it was revealed that Eve would have an affair with Carl King, played by Tom Lister. Commenting on the storyline, Shaw said "I was really excited when I found out Eve would be having an affair with Carl but I quickly realised it would make me very unpopular with the majority of Emmerdale fans because everyone loves Carl and Chas together. So I’m preparing myself for all the trouble it’s going to cause. It’s a great storyline and I have no idea how it will all turn out. There’s also the small matter of Chas. It’s going to take some doing for Carl to keep it from her. It would be a brave or a stupid man who tests Chas but Carl seems determined to give it a go and Eve certainly isn’t one to hold back. One thing’s for sure, if Chas does uncover Carl’s dirty secret he’ll be wise to sleep with one eye open!"

Eve and Carl have an affair.(2010)

In September 2010 Shaw and Lister teased of the storyline Shaw said "Quite a bit. We don't quite know what's going to happen around Christmas time but there's something juicy coming up." also Lister said "It's all going well so far. I'm having a great time and I think it's going to play out a bit longer. We'll see whether he gets found out or not." Lucy Pargeter, who plays Chas hinted that her firebrand alter ego may react in a surprising way if she eventually rumbles the affair. she said "It's either going to be the usual Chas thing or we'll go against the grain and do something not necessarily expected, but who knows, we've got a long time to run it yet."

=== Departure ===
In April 2011, it was announced that Shaw was to leave Emmerdale. Of her departure, Shaw said "Playing Eve has been a wonderful experience for me. I have had the opportunity to work with some incredibly talented people and to learn from them. After much soul-searching we decided that as a family we wanted to be based in one place at this point in our lives. My family must come first and I have therefore decided to leave the show in the summer."

== Storylines ==
=== 2001–2006 ===
Eve is the daughter of Peter Birch (Philip Bird). After Eve's mother died, Peter moved to France due to his work commitments. He fell in love with a woman called Jacqueline and they later married. Eve disliked her stepmother and when Peter and Jacqueline were going through a rough patch, he was concerned about the effect that their difficulties were having on Eve, so he sent her to stay with his mother, Eve's grandmother Edna Birch to do her A Levels. Eve was 17 and had been living in France for six years. Upon arriving in Emmerdale, Eve befriends the other teenagers in the village. She sets her sights on Marc Reynolds (Anthony Lewis), despite him being involved with Donna Windsor (Verity Rushworth). Against Donna's wishes, Eve pursues Marc and they become a couple, later sleeping together.

In September 2001, whilst on a night out in Hotten, Eve, Marc, Andy Sugden (Kelvin Fletcher), Robert Sugden (Karl Davies), Ollie Reynolds (Vicky Binns), and Katie Addyman steal a car after missing the last bus home. They are involved in a hit and run accident, which results in the death of their headmistress, Miss Strickland (Alex Hall). Marc was the one driving but Eve keeps a cool head and encourages the gang to lie about the accident. In 2002, Eve continues to keep the web of lies going until Marc confesses and is imprisoned. Eve and the other teenagers are given community service. Eve's true colours come to her grandmother's attention when Eve kicks Edna's Yorkshire Terrier, Batley. Edna is shocked and sends Eve to live with her great-aunt, Lily Butterfield (Anne Charleston).

In October 2006, Edna, with escort Tom King (Ken Farrington), attends Eve's wedding to James Jenson. During this time, Edna confides in Tom that Eve is actually Lily's granddaughter, as Lily is Peter's birth mother.

=== 2010–2011 ===
In April 2010, Eve returns to Emmerdale to stay with Edna after leaving James, who is in debt. Edna discovers that Eve had slept with James's best friend and warns her not to take advantage of her kindness. On discovering Eve is back in the village, Andy and Katie make it clear that Eve is not welcome but she shows up at Ryan Lamb (James Sutton) and Andy's house warming party regardless and kisses Ryan just as a disgusted Katie, Ryan's ex-girlfriend, arrives. Ryan and Eve sleep together but the following day, Eve tells Ryan that she isn't interested in a relationship.

By May, Edna is frustrated with Eve's excuses for not being able to find a job. Edna asks Moira Barton (Natalie J. Robb) if her husband John (James Thornton) has any work and she starts work at Butler's Farm as a farmhand. Eve admits to Moira that she is interested in John, much to Moira's annoyance. Moira confronts John about this but he reassures her that he would never play away. Despite this, Eve and John later kiss whilst sitting in John's land rover, which is witnessed by Cain Dingle (Jeff Hordley), who tells Moira. Moira confronts John again and throws him out after he admits kissing Eve, she also sacks Eve from her job. Eve then gets a job working as an office assistant at Emmerdale Haulage and begins flirting with her boss Carl King. She sets up a business with Carl's half-sister Scarlett Nicholls (Kelsey-Beth Crossley), organizing Hen Parties. After Carl helps Eve out when her car breaks down on the day of Shadrach Dingle's (Andy Devine) funeral, she and Carl kiss and later embark on an affair. During this time, Eve befriends Carl's girlfriend, Chas Dingle (Lucy Pargeter), and later feels guilty but Carl reassures her that it is a bit of fun and that Chas need never know.

Carl's brother Jimmy (Nick Miles) finds out about the affair when he catches them together and threatens to tell Chas unless he ends things with Eve. Carl lies to Jimmy, that he has ended the relationship but Edna also finds out and berates Carl and Eve, telling Eve that she hasn't learned anything from her encounter with John. She then promises to support Eve, whatever happens.

In October, Chas finds out about the affair when, after attending a lingerie party held by Chas's half-sister, Gennie Walker (Sian Reese-Williams), Eve buys some new underwear and meeting Carl, accidentally leaves her underwear there. Chas and Charity Dingle (Emma Atkins) find the underwear and realizes that Carl is having an affair as the underwear is not hers. She and Charity ask Gennie to try and identify the underwear and she confirms that Eve bought it. The following day, Chas and Charity see Eve leaving Carl's house and the pair kiss, confirming her worst fears. Chas swears revenge on Eve and Carl and with Charity's encouragement, she starts making their lives difficult. On Bonfire Night, Chas puts a toffee apple in Eve's hat, causing it to melt and get stuck in her hair. Eve blames Jacob Gallagher (Joe-Warren Plant), leading to an argument with Jacob's mother Alicia (Natalie Anderson). Chas then cuts Eve's hair in order to remove the toffee. When Eve is tasked with looking after the money for her and Scarlett's business, Chas steals the money and Eve gets the blame. Chas then proposes to Carl and lies that she is pregnant so Carl ends things with Eve, telling her that he loves Chas and that their fling was just a bit of fun. Eve is upset and goes to France to sort out her divorce. Chas asks Eve to be a bridesmaid at her wedding and she is forced to accept and on Carl's stag night, Chas's brother Cain becomes suspicious and overhears an argument between Carl and Eve, and realizing that they had an affair, punches Carl. Charity then tells him of Chas's revenge plan and he apologizes, pretending to have been mistaken.

On Christmas Day, the wedding goes ahead and Chas reveals Carl and Eve's affair to the congregation and punches Carl, and jilting him. The following day, Chas picks a fight with Eve in the pub. In January, Scarlett visits her mother in Canada so Eve takes care of the business in her absence. When Jimmy goes missing, Eve tries to comfort Carl and Jimmy's wife, Nicola (Nicola Wheeler), but they both shun her. After Jimmy is found and returns to the village, suffering from amnesia, Eve befriends Kelly Windsor (Adele Silva), Jimmy's ex-fiancée, who is trying to convince Jimmy that they were having an affair at the time he lost his memory. In order to back Kelly's claims up, and to get revenge on Carl and Nicola for their ill-treatment, Eve forges hotel receipts and fakes photographs of Jimmy and Kelly together. When Kelly reveals that she had attacked Jimmy, giving him the injuries that had caused his amnesia, Eve suggests that Kelly tell Jimmy the truth.

When Debbie Dingle's (Charley Webb) boyfriend Cameron Murray (Dominic Power) gets a job working for the haulage firm, he and Eve start flirting. Carl stirs things up by intimating that Cameron and Eve are having an affair. Chas and Debbie warn Eve off and she denies any wrongdoing.

When Scarlett decides to leave for Mexico, she folds the Hen Party business and Eve is unemployed again. Carl mocks her for this and Eve becomes disillusioned with her life in the village and after talking to Alicia, who is emigrating to Spain, considers leaving too. The next day in the pub, Eve helps herself to a drink whilst the bar is unmanned. Diane Sugden (Elizabeth Estensen) catches her and Eve offers to help out whilst Diane is busy. Chas, who now co-owns the pub, is furious about this and orders her out. Eve taunts Chas about her son Aaron's (Danny Miller) recent murder trial and being single and Chas threatens her. Eve reveals her plans to move to Mexico with Scarlett and Chas warns her that Scarlett will soon find out what a back stabbing cow she is. Edna takes Eve home and attempts to talk her out of leaving but Eve's mind is made up, telling Edna she is fed up with the villagers' hostility towards her. After bidding Edna farewell, Eve calls a taxi and leaves for Mexico.
