= Jan Constantine =

British designer

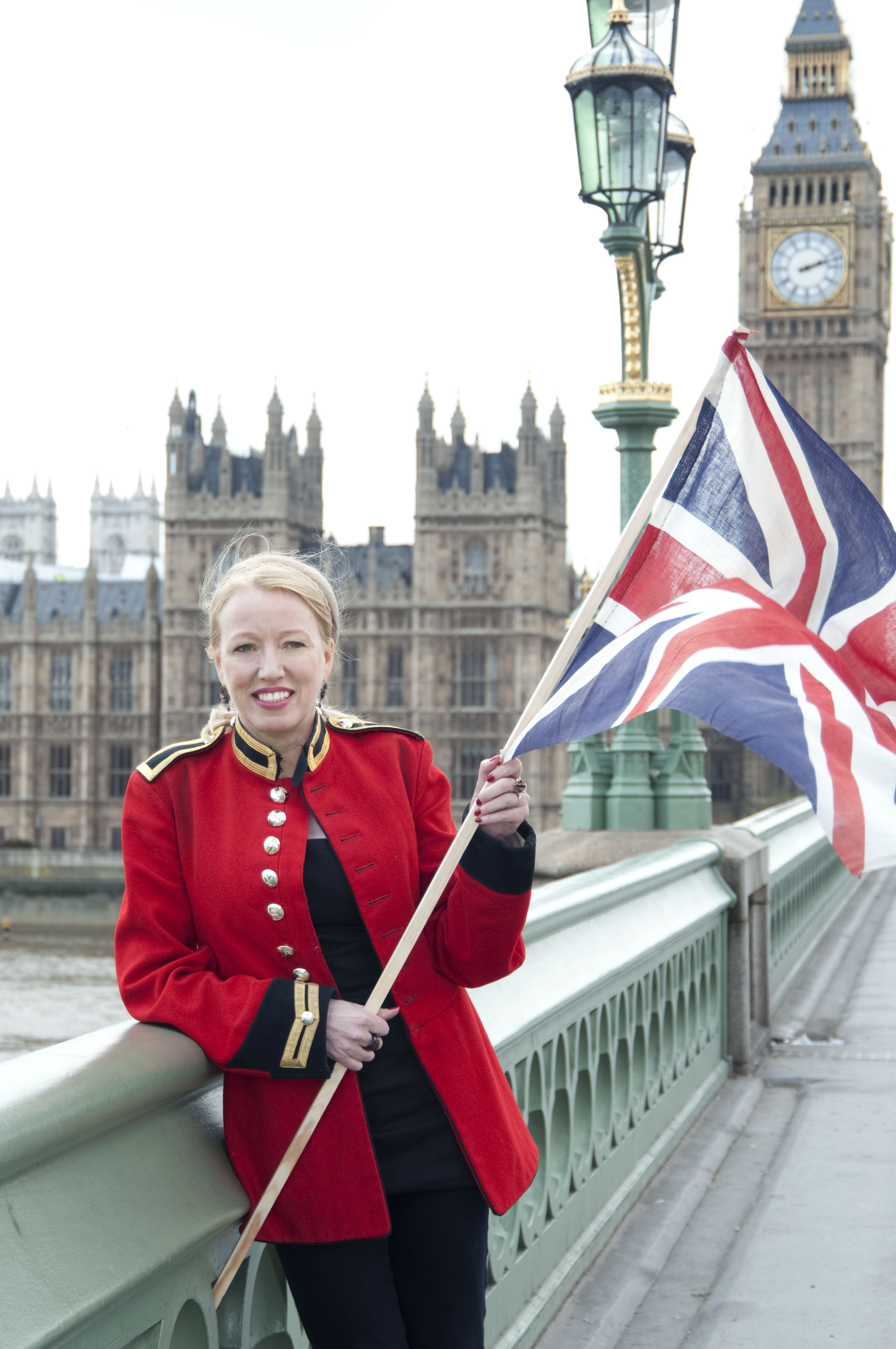
- Jan Constantine in London, 2008
- Born: Bury, Greater Manchester, England
- Occupations: Designer and managing director of jan constantine ltd.

Jan Constantine is a British designer, businesswoman and author. She is the head designer and managing director of Jan Constantine Ltd. She is widely recognised for her hand-embroidered cushions, accessories and patriotic interiors, and she has written two books.

== Early life ==
Jan Constantine was born into a large Catholic family in Bury, Greater Manchester. Her mother was a tailoress and her grandmother was a milliner and dressmaker, and as a result, Constantine was exposed to sewing from an early age. She attended St Gabriel's RC High School, Bury, before going on to study fashion at Bolton College of Art. The fashion photographer and filmmaker Elaine Constantine is her sister.

== Career ==
Jan Constantine has worked in fashion and design since leaving college. In the early stages of her career, Constantine was a fashion designer; later, she established an interior design business, and worked as a stylist for magazines and advertisers in London before eventually founding the company that shares her name. She has stated in interviews that she believes craft in the digital age to be very important, and this belief has become a driving force in her work in textiles and design, and particularly in her championing of traditional embroidery.

After graduating, Constantine worked as a junior designer and then as design director for three fashion labels within the prestigious company Shubette of London. In her work for Shubette, Constantine worked on her own designer label, Soufflé. After ten years living and working in London, she moved to the Staffordshire/Cheshire countryside to pursue a future career in interior design.

=== Jan Constantine Ltd. ===
Jan Constantine Ltd. is an internationally recognised brand of hand-embroidered textiles and accessories. The company's tagline states that the products are destined to be "hand-embroidered heirlooms of the future".

In 2002, Jan Constantine founded a company under her own name: Jan Constantine Ltd. In various interviews, she has stated that the company began as a small enterprise, sewing lavender bags around her kitchen table with friends.

The company has produced numerous themed Collections of hand-embroidered goods. The first Collections produced by Jan Constantine Ltd. were the Bees and Bugs and Seaside Collections, both of which were launched at The Spirit of Christmas retail fair in 2002. The company attended its first trade fair, Top Drawer, in January 2004, and it was here that Fortnum & Mason became the first major store to place an order.

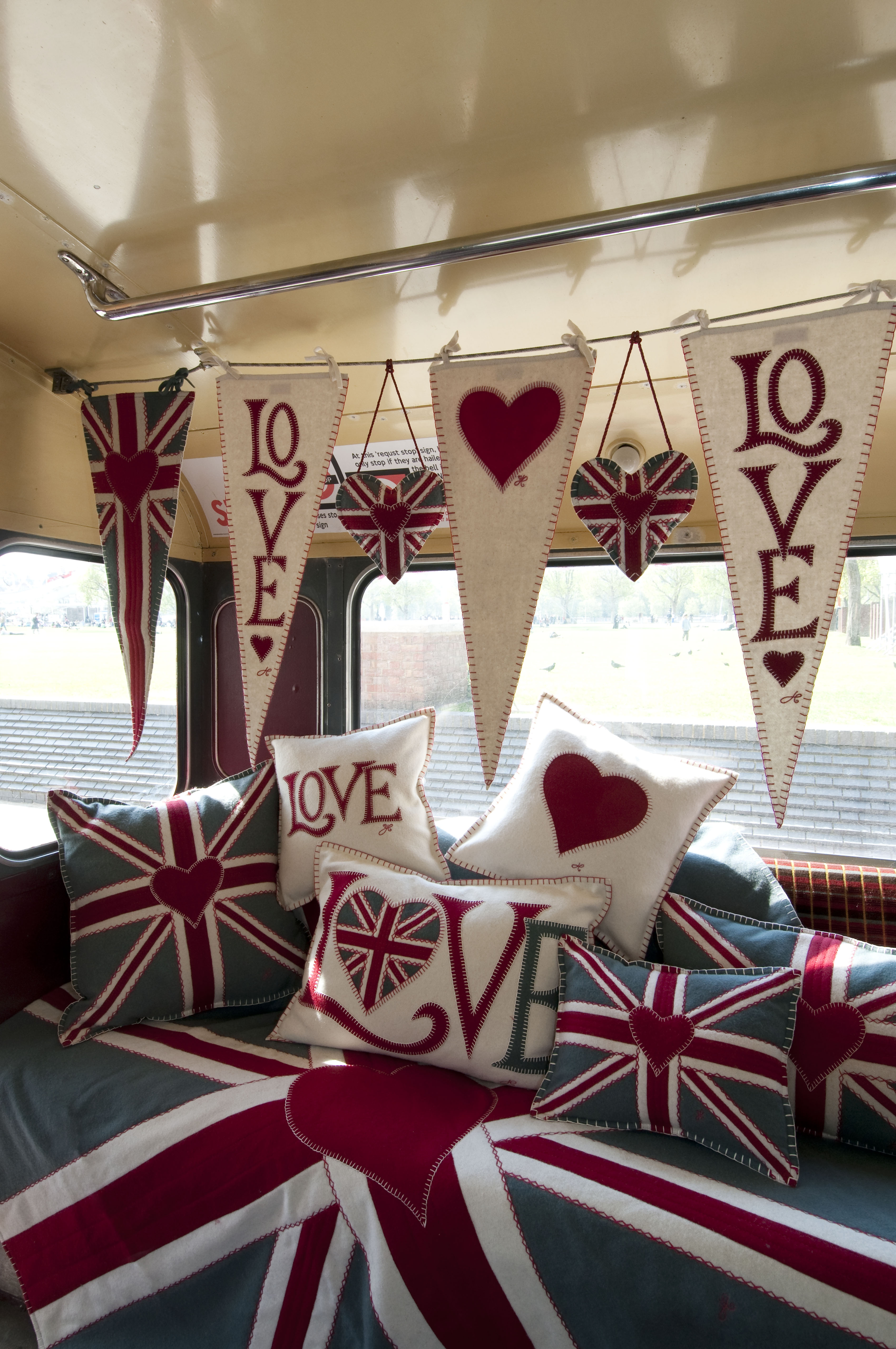
Jan Constantine's Union Jack design

In 2005, Constantine introduced coloured felt wool to her designs (which had previously been created predominantly in cream and white linen), and released the Union Jack and heart design for which she has since become renowned. Constantine is widely credited as the starting point of a Union Jack renaissance in the UK, and is instantly recognisable in interior design for her patriotic themes.

In 2007, Jan Constantine was a finalist in the Country Living Enterprising Rural Women Awards for Best Growing Business.

In 2010, Constantine was approached by Brand Culture to help promote the 2011 film The King's Speech, as promoters recognised a synergy between Constantine's work and their own. Constantine took part in various campaigns to help raise awareness of the film, and attended the premiere in January 2011; to mark the film's release, she created limited edition products including the 'Bertie' cushion and a selection of goods bearing a 'God Save the King' design.

In February 2012, Jan Constantine Ltd. celebrated its tenth birthday. The company also produced widely distributed Collections to commemorate the Diamond Jubilee of Elizabeth II and the 2012 Summer Olympics (for which Constantine won a license to produce goods in 2009).

In 2013, Jan Constantine made the move into the Japanese market, having already sold products in various areas of the US and Europe. Also in 2013, she collaborated with brands such as Pimm's, Liz Earle and Fortnum & Mason.

=== Publications ===
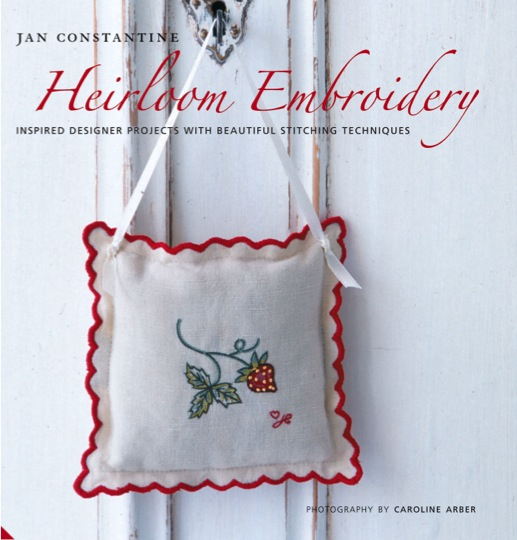
Jan Constantine's first embroidery book, Heirloom Embroidery

Jan Constantine's first embroidery book, Heirloom Embroidery, was published by Jacqui Small in September 2009. A further book, Love Stitching, was published in 2011. The books have been published in the US as well as the UK, and in various other countries and languages.

=== Media ===
In July and August 2011, Constantine took part in ITV1's television show Auction Party. She played the role of an industry expert on several episodes to lead her team to victory and raise money for selected charities. She appeared on German television in 2012, discussing her Olympic and British collections in Fortnum & Mason.

Constantine and her homes have appeared in various magazines including Country Homes & Interiors, RSVP Japan, Cheshire Life, Cottage Style, The English Home and Country Living.

== Personal life ==
Jan Constantine resides with her husband, David, in a Georgian house in the Staffordshire countryside near Nantwich in Cheshire.
