= Lauren Harries =

English media personality (born 1978)

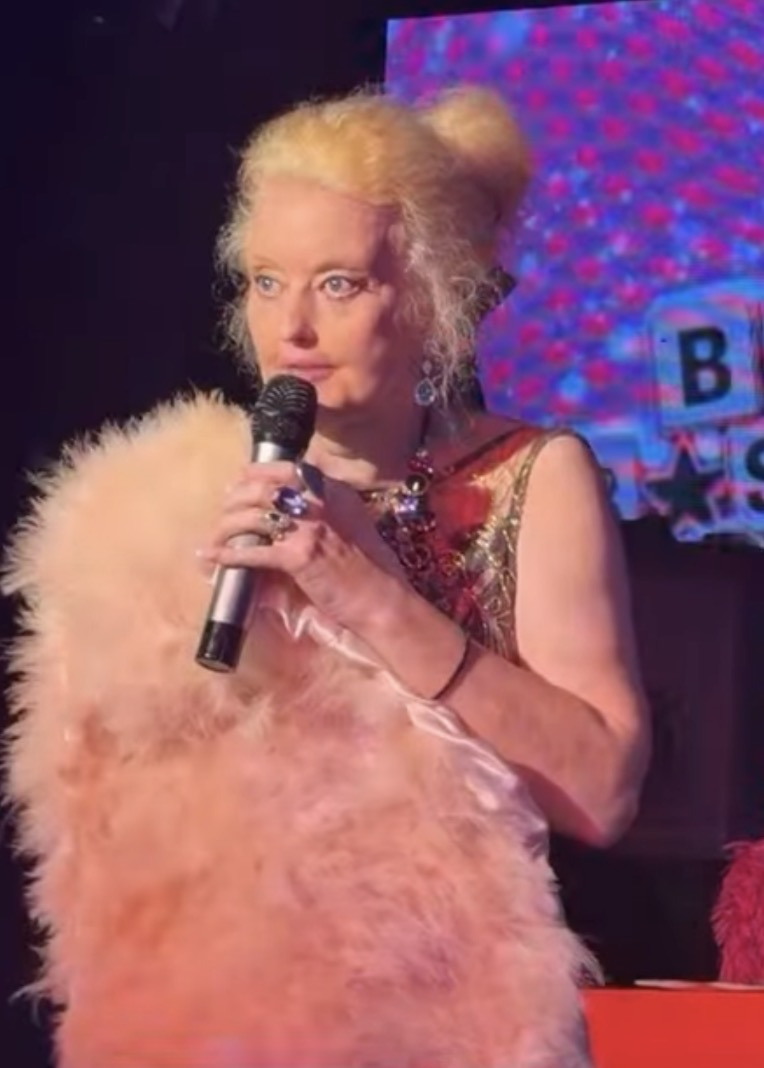
- Harries in 2026
- Born: James Charles Harries; 6 March 1978 (age 48); Surrey, England
- Occupation: Media personality
- Years active: 1988–present
- Website: laurenharries.com

Lauren Charlotte Harries (born James Charles Harries; 6 March 1978) is an English media personality. As a child, she was known for her knowledge of antiques and appeared on numerous television shows including Wogan (1988), After Dark (1991) and The Oprah Winfrey Show (1991), as well as writing an antique guide Rags to Riches (1993)

In later life, following her gender reassignment surgery, she starred in a documentary Little Lady Fauntleroy (2004), and became known for her appearances on reality television programmes, including The Salon (2004), Trust Me – I'm a Beauty Therapist (2006), Big Brother's Bit on the Side (2011–2014), Naked Attraction (2019) and most notably, as a housemate on the twelfth series of Celebrity Big Brother (2013), in which she reached the final and finished in third place. She also released the singles "I Am a Woman" (2015), "All Dressed Up" (2015) and "Upadoo" (2018).

== Early life ==
Lauren Charlotte Harries was born James Charles Harries on 6 March 1978 in Surrey to Kathleen and Mark Harries. She has an older brother Adam, and a younger brother, Patrick. Harries' father worked in the hotel business and catering trade. Her mother worked as a stripper in South Africa and previously owned an escort agency in Soho. The family moved to Cardiff when Harries was still a baby. From the age of five, she enjoyed art and antiques and had an apparent ability to spot bargains at local jumble sales and second-hand shops.

== Career ==
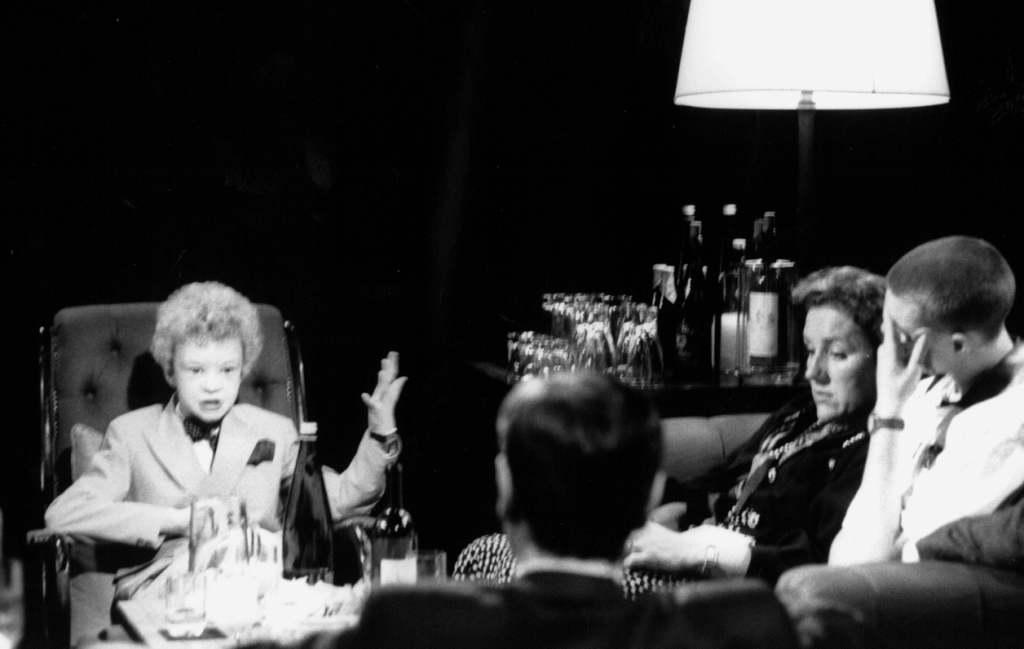
Harries appearing on After Dark on 23 March 1991, aged 13

Harries began making television appearances in August 1988 on Terry Wogan's chat show, Wogan. The then ten-year-old demonstrated a good knowledge of antiques, and appeared on other shows including After Dark and The Oprah Winfrey Show. At 13, she wrote an antique guide, Rags to Riches.

In 2004, after Harries had undergone gender reassignment surgery, Channel 4 broadcast a documentary Little Lady Fauntleroy, fronted by actor Keith Allen in which Allen interviewed the Harries family. The documentary aimed to make a mockery of the Harries family, however revealed that they had falsified and exaggerated some of their claims, notably that the counsellor who looked after Harries during her sex change operation was named Lesley Stewart, which was revealed to be an alias of Kaye Harries, her own mother. They were also accused of faking their qualifications, doctorates in metaphysics and counselling degrees, that had been issued by the Cardiff College of Humanistic Studies, located at Tudor Cottage, their own house. The documentary was released on DVD on 4 July 2005. In October 2006, Harries appeared in the Channel 5 television series Trust Me – I'm a Beauty Therapist, which was filmed on location in a beauty therapist's in Swansea, Wales. In November 2008, Harries was featured as a cover girl in the specialist lifestyle magazine Transliving. In 2010, Harries starred in a Showcase TV series Lauren Harries: Working 9-5, in which she spent five days working different jobs.

In August 2013, Harries became a housemate on the twelfth series of Celebrity Big Brother. She finished in third place. In September 2013, she appeared on Celebrity Juice. Her debut single "I Am a Woman" was released in January 2015. Harries released a follow-up single, "All Dressed Up" in May 2015. In March 2018, Harries appeared on The Jeremy Kyle Show alongside Lisa Appleton after the pair fell out whilst on holiday in Benidorm. Her final single, "Upadoo" was released in May 2018. In August 2019, Harries made an appearance on the Channel 4 dating series Naked Attraction, becoming the first celebrity to appear on the series. She was rejected by the contestant, who said that Harries was too old for him. Harries said she felt empowered doing the show and did it to show herself off as a transgender woman. In late 2025, Harries released an autobiography, Becoming Lauren, in collaboration with Edward Payne. Harries is also an artist and sells paintings via her website. In August 2026, Harries made a club appearance at Hot Mess Club in Manchester, performing some of her solo tracks.

== Personal life ==
Harries' schooling suffered from the heightened publicity. By the age of 14, Harries suffered depression and agoraphobia, which led to a nervous breakdown and suicide attempt. Media opportunities and resulting business reduced as Harries grew up. In the recession of the early 1990s, the family's businesses failed. One family shop was destroyed by fire, and her father was convicted of insurance fraud. Harries sold some of her collections to assist in the support of the family. Harries then took three GCSEs after home tutoring.

As a child, Harries had been taken by her family to see a doctor because she displayed feminine mannerisms. Later, Harries decided to transition from male to female, change her name to Lauren Charlotte, and investigated gender reassignment surgery, which was carried out in 2001. Funding for this was generated from publicity arranged by Max Clifford. In July 2005, a group of five to seven men attacked Harries, her father and her brother in the family home. One 17-year-old boy was later fined and given a supervision order for his role in the incident.

=== Health ===
In April 2023, Harries underwent an emergency brain surgery for an undiagnosed illness. In June 2023, Harries was placed in an induced coma for several days. In July 2023, Harries underwent an additional emergency spinal surgery. Following the surgery, Harries posted to social media for the first time in three months, thanking fans for their support. Harries was released in December 2023, after seven months in hospital.

== Filmography ==
| Year | Title | Notes | Ref. |
|---|---|---|---|
| 1988 | Wogan | Guest | |
| 1991 | After Dark | Guest | |
| 1991 | Ring My Bell | Guest | |
| 1991 | The Oprah Winfrey Show | Guest | |
| 1993 | Terry Wogan's Friday Night | Guest | |
| 1992 | Between Ourselves | Guest | |
| 2001 | Live Talk | Guest; 1 episode | |
| 2002 | After They Were Famous | Guest; 1 episode | |
| 2002 | Open House with Gloria Hunniford | Guest; 1 episode | |
| 2004 | Little Lady Fauntleroy | Documentary | |
| 2004 | The Salon | 1 episode | |
| 2005 | The Child Star Jinx | Guest; 1 episode | |
| 2005–2006 | Big Brother's Big Mouth | Guest | |
| 2006 | Wogan Now & Then | Guest; 1 episode | |
| 2006 | Trust Me – I'm a Beauty Therapist | 10 episodes | |
| 2009, 2013–2014, 2017 | This Morning | Guest / Antiques expert; 7 episodes | |
| 2010 | Lauren Harries: Working 9-5 | Main role | |
| 2011–2014 | Big Brother's Bit on the Side | Guest; 32 episodes | |
| 2012 | World's Greatest Body Shockers | Guest; 1 episode | |
| 2013 | Celebrity Big Brother | Housemate; series 12 | |
| 2013 | Celebrity Juice | Guest; 1 episode | |
| 2014 | Bodyshockers | Guest; 1 episode | |
| 2014 | TV Od | Guest; 1 episode | |
| 2017 | Celebrity 100% Hotter | Guest; 1 episode | |
| 2017 | Loose Women | Guest; 1 episode | |
| 2018 | The Jeremy Kyle Show | Guest; 1 episode | |
| 2019 | Celebrity Fry-Up | Guest; 1 episode | |
| 2019 | Naked Attraction | Contestant; 1 episode | |

== Discography ==
=== Singles ===
| Title | Year | Album |
|---|---|---|
| "I Am a Woman" | 2015 | Non-album single |
| "All Dressed Up" | 2015 | Non-album single |
| "Upadoo" | 2018 | Non-album single |

== Bibliography ==
- Rags to Riches (1991)
- Becoming Lauren (2025)
