= Trust Me – I'm a Beauty Therapist =

British television series

Trust Me – I'm a Beauty Therapist is a reality television show broadcast on Five in which eight British celebrities trained to become beauticians in a South Wales beauty salon. They had to perform such tasks as, cutting hair, giving massages, applying fake tan, giving manicures, pedicures and waxing.

The series was aired in October 2006. The celebrities that took part were:

- John Alford (former actor)
- Stan Boardman (comedian)
- Danny Foster (ex member of Hear'Say)
- Lauren Harries (former antiques expert)
- Oscar Humphries (socialite and son of Barry Humphries)
- Michelle Marsh (model)
- Sharon Marshall (soap opera expert)
- Suzi Quatro (entertainer — the first female bass player to become a major rock star)

Quatro says that this was the only one of her shows that she should not have done. The show was sold to her as a documentary. On discovering that it was a reality show, she "screamed and shouted" and accused the producer of "lying" to her. She concluded, "I won’t be doing another reality show. I didn’t really learn anything. I can do a simple haircut now and that’s about it."
