= Upadoo =

2018 single by Lauren Harries

Single by Lauren Harries
- Released: 8 May 2018
- Recorded: October 2017
- Genre: Pop; dance
- Length: 4:50
- Label: Nouveau Records
- Songwriters: Lauren Harries; Jos Summers
- Producer: Jos Summers

Lauren Harries singles chronology
"All Dressed Up" (2015)	"Upadoo" (2018)

"Upadoo" is a song by English media personality Lauren Harries. The song was released on 8 May 2018 and was debuted with a performance at a gay pride event in Exeter. Following its release, the singer promoted the song via her Instagram and Twitter accounts, encouraging fans to create and submit their own fan-made single artwork, copies of which were posted on Harries' official account.

== Music video ==
In January 2018, Harries announced via Twitter that a video for the song was planned and scheduled to be filmed the following week. The singer was subsequently seen filming a music video on a boardwalk near a lake, in a black dress and pink boots. The shoot was hit by controversy when Harries tripped and fell into the lake during filming.

In July 2018, Harries confirmed via Twitter that the video was coming soon. However, no video for the song has yet been released.

== Live performances ==
Following its release, Harries performed the song at a number of gay pride events around the United Kingdom and Ireland, including Exeter, Warwick and Dublin.

== Track listings ==
- Digital download
1. "Upadoo" — 4:49
- Streaming
1. "Upadoo" — 4:50

== Release history ==
Region	Date	Format	Label
Various	8 May 2018	Digital download, Streaming	Nouveau Records
