= Lily Butterfield =

Fictional character from Emmerdale

- Emmerdale character
- Portrayed by: Anne Charleston
- Duration: 2006–2009
- First appearance: 3 November 2006
- Last appearance: 3 August 2009
- Introduced by: Keith Richardson
In-universe information
- Occupation: Machinist
- Father: Ernest Burrows
- Sisters: Edna Birch
- Husband: Stan Butterfield (backstory)
- Sons: Peter Birch
- Granddaughters: Eve Jenson
- Grandmothers: Florence Taylor
- First cousins: Mildred Finch
- Other relatives: Harriet Finch

Lily Butterfield is a fictional character from the British ITV soap opera Emmerdale, played by Anne Charleston. She made her first appearance on 3 November 2006. Lily is Edna Birch's (Shirley Stelfox) estranged sister and the biological mother to Edna's son, Peter Birch (Philip Bird). Charleston quit her role in April 2009 and the character departed on 3 August 2009.

== Casting ==
In September 2006, it was announced that former Neighbours actress Charleston had joined the cast of Emmerdale as Edna Birch's (Shirley Stelfox) estranged sister, Lily. Charleston was due to appear in three episodes in November of that year with a potential longer run to follow. Charleston said that she was "over the moon" to be joining the cast. Lily first appears at her great niece, Eve Jenson's (Raine Davison) wedding. Charleston said "I am over the moon to be joining one of my favourite soaps and I am delighted to be playing such a fantastic character." Charleston and Davison began filming on 25 September 2006 and their scenes were broadcast on 3 November.

In March 2007, Charleston was asked to return to the show after her first appearance was deemed a success. Of her return, Charleston said "I'm thrilled to have been asked back and am looking forward to working with Shirley Stelfox again. It will be interesting to discover more about Lily’s background and character this time around, and I am excited to see where writers take me." Charleston began filming her new scenes in the Summer.

Charleston quit her role in April 2009 and her character was written out in August.

== Storylines ==
Lily came to Emmerdale in October 2007 and stayed with Edna initially but their obvious personality differences caused friction. After finding out Lily was growing cannabis at Home Farm, Edna evicted her from the house. Lily later left the village in shame on 23 January but returned several months later and made up with Edna.

On Lily's return to the village, she stayed at the B&B until Pearl Ladderbanks (Meg Johnson) invited her to move in. She was lonely and Lily needed somewhere to stay so it seemed a perfect match. Lily also got a job as machinist at Pollards' factory, where she made friends with the other girls.

Lily used her love for entering magazine competitions and contests to create a pool with Pearl, Douglas Potts (Duncan Preston) and Betty Eagleton (Paula Tilbrook) where they entered many competitions. Pearl won a cruise for two and Lily and Betty buttered her up for the other ticket. Finally, she asked Lily to go with her but Lily's attempts to take over caused Pearl's then-boyfriend, Joe Jacobs (John Woodvine), to drop a suitcase on Lily's foot in anger. Lily had to miss the cruise and Joe went with Pearl.

In September 2008, Peter returned for a surprise visit, as he was desperate for money. When he wanted £10,000, she told him he'd already had almost every penny she had but he insisted she owed him for what she'd put him through. When she was unable to help, Peter stormed out, leaving Lily in tears.

Lily thought things were looking up when she and the factory girls won a car in a raffle. They planned to sell it and Lily offered Peter her share but he blackmailed her to give him the ticket, which she did reluctantly. Attempting to cover her tracks, she convinced everyone that Pearl had got the number wrong and that they had not won anything, after all. Factory boss Val was suspicious and soon discovered the truth so Lily confessed. Edna gave Lily her life savings, claiming Peter had agreed to give the money back. Until the money came through, Lily had to work at the factory for free.

Val Pollard (Charlie Hardwick) and the other factory staff were disgusted that Lily had lied and tried to blame Pearl for her dishonesty and didn't want anything to do with her. One day, she collapsed at work with a bad headache. She insisted she was fine, not revealing that the doctor had told her if she felt bad again, to go to hospital. Following a second collapse, Rodney Blackstock (Patrick Mower) took her to hospital and after tests, learned she had a cerebral aneurysm and would need surgery. Lily went into denial, telling Rodney the doctor had just got it wrong.

She remained adamant she was not undergoing the procedure until December 2008 when she started getting dizzy spells and finally, after collapsing again, decided to have the operation. She refused to tell Edna about her condition, telling her instead that she was going away when she was, in fact, in hospital. She fled the hospital before the procedure, meaning Rodney had to contact Edna and tell her everything. Leaving the choir competition, she found Lily and convinced her to have the operation. On 19 December 2008, she was released from hospital, following a successful operation.

After meeting and getting on with Alan Turner's (Richard Thorp) old friend, Eddy Fox (Paul Darrow), she offered him a place to stay when Betty insisted he leave her house. He had asked Alan to join him on a round the world trip and Alan agreed initially but later changed his mind. Lily suggested she go with him instead and he agreed but Betty and Edna were unhappy about the idea. Betty felt Eddy could not be trusted and Edna felt Lily was too old for such antics. Just before she left Lily made peace with Edna, who wished her the best of luck and made her promise to keep in regular contact. Lily and Eddy then left the village.

In January 2016, Lily falls ill and Edna goes to stay with her for a while. However, after Edna dies in May 2016, Ashley reveals that she had been diagnosed with ovarian cancer and, wanting to keep her illness secret, she had lied about Lily being ill in order to leave the village.
