= Sharon Marshall =

British journalist

- Born: Sharon Jean Marshall; 21 September 1971 (age 54); England
- Occupations: Screen writer; Author; Entertainment journalist; TV personality
- Years active: 1994–present
- Known for: ITV's This Morning

Sharon Jean Marshall (born 21 September 1971) is a British entertainment journalist, TV personality, screenwriter and author. She is best known for being the resident "Soap Expert" on ITV's This Morning since 2003 making her the current longest serving presenter on the show and writing episodes for both Emmerdale and EastEnders.

In 2025, Sharon Marshall took on the role of host for An Audience with Coronation Street, a live theatre tour celebrating the soap’s 65th anniversary. Beginning at London’s Dominion Theatre and continuing at venues across the country, the production combines archive clips, cast interviews, and fan interaction. Marshall’s warm and witty presenting style has drawn strong reviews, with commentators noting her ability to balance humour, nostalgia, and emotion. The tour has been met with an enthusiastic response, with sold-out audiences and standing ovations highlighting its success.

== Television career ==
In 2006, Marshall appeared as a contestant on ITV's Celebrity Fit Club and Five's, Trust Me – I'm a Beauty Therapist. She is also recognisable from appearances as talking heads in many celebrity-based documentaries and as a guest panellist on Loose Women in 2007. She has made other television appearances on EastEnders Revealed, Big Brother's Big Mouth and the British Soap Awards.

== Writing ==
Marshall worked on Fleet Street for 10 years and was the TV editor of the News of the World. She used to contribute a weekly column No Sex in the City to The Sun. Marshall is co-author of The Naughty Girl's Guide to Life with Tara Palmer-Tomkinson, which was published by Sphere on 20 September 2007. She is also an episode writer for soaps EastEnders and Emmerdale. As of August 2025, she has written 48 episodes of Emmerdale and 26 episodes of EastEnders. In 2010 Sharon released her book "Tabloid Girl", memoirs of her 10 years as a tabloid reporter.

== Personal life ==
Marshall lives in West London with marketing executive Paul Fletcher and rescue dog Lily.

Sharon announced on This Morning on 16 January 2018 that she was 14 weeks pregnant. She gave birth to her first child, daughter Betsey Fletcher, on 10 July 2018.
