= Johnny Shentall =

British pop singer (born 1978)

- Born: John George Shentall; 3 September 1978 (age 47); Doncaster, South Yorkshire, England
- Genres: Pop, dance
- Occupation: Singer
- Instrument: Vocals
- Years active: 2000–2002 (as singer); 2008 (reality)
- Labels: MCA Music, Polydor

John George Shentall (born 3 September 1978) is a British pop singer. He was a member of the pop group Boom! before joining another pop group, Hear'Say in 2002. He is married to Steps band member Lisa Scott-Lee.

== Career ==
Shentall first became a member of the short-lived pop group Boom! in 2000. They had one hit single, "Falling", in January 2001. In early 2002, Shentall joined the pop group Hear'Say, replacing Kym Marsh after winning auditions. Hear'Say disbanded later that year.

=== Musicals ===
Shentall has worked in musical theatre, including performing in 2006 as Chuck Cranston in Footloose at the Novello Theatre in London's West End, and as Hip Hopper and understudy Greaseball in Starlight Express.

=== Television ===
He was one of the celebrities who took part in ITV2's CelebAir. His wife, Lisa Scott-Lee, also participated. They were both 'sacked' on 2 October 2008 in a double elimination after abandoning their duties as cabin crew to go clubbing in Ibiza, where they were at the time.
