= I Am a Woman (song) =

2015 single by Lauren Harries

Single by Lauren Harries
- Released: 11 January 2015
- Genre: Pop
- Length: 4:14
- Label: Erlectro Music
- Songwriters: Edward Russell; Michael Lewis
- Producers: Edward Russell; Michael Lewis

Lauren Harries singles chronology
"I Am a Woman" (2015)	"All Dressed Up" (2015)

Music video
- "I Am a Woman" on YouTube

"I Am a Woman" is a song recorded by English media personality Lauren Harries. The song was released on 11 January 2015 as her debut single. It was written and produced by Edward Russell and Michael Lewis and was released by Erlectro Music.

The lyrical content of "I Am a Woman" explores Harries' experiences as a transgender woman. She was inspired to make it following encouragement from fans after her appearance as a housemate on Celebrity Big Brother in 2013. Russell admitted that working with Harries was difficult and billed her an untalented singer, but was proud of the song they had made.

== Background and release ==
In December 2014, Harries began teasing "I Am a Woman" and debuted the music video for the single. It was released on 11 January 2015 through Erlectro Music and was written and produced by Edward Russell and Michael Lewis. Russell described working with Harries as "difficult" and said that she was "not a gifted singer", but said that he was proud of the song they did together. The song is based on Harries' experience of being a transgender woman and reflects on her life as such. It is a mid-tempo synth-heavy pop song, and spans 4 minutes and 14 seconds in length. A shorter version not featuring the spoken verse was also released, lasting 3 minutes 48 seconds. Harries said she was inspired to write the song following encouragement from fans after her appearance as a housemate on Celebrity Big Brother and aimed to "change perceptions of the transgender community".

== Music video ==
A music video for the single was produced and was revealed prior to the single. It begins with Harries first holding a candelabra and performing a spoken word verse, before the saxophone playing begins and she is seen in a studio wearing a black outfits and is surrounded by mannequins, where she begins to perform light choreography. Another part of the video sees Harries in a red dress, having her hair and make-up done, whilst another sees her sitting on a red sofa and walking down stairs in a polka dot dress and black hat.. A shorter version of the video, not including the spoken word verse at the beginning, was also released.

== Track listing ==
Digital download/streaming

1. "I Am a Woman" – 4:14

Digital download/streaming

1. "I Am a Woman" (Remix) – 3:48

== Personnel ==
Credits adapted from Spotify.

- Lauren Harries – vocals
- Edward Russell – production, songwriting, vocals
- Michael Lewis – production, songwriting, piano
- Ioan Morris – bass guitar
- Joe Atkin-Reeves – saxophone

== Release history ==
Region	Date	Format	Label	Ref.
Various	11 January 2015	Digital download, streaming	Erlectro Records	
