= Edna Birch =

Fictional character from Emmerdale

- Emmerdale character
- Portrayed by: Shirley Stelfox
- Duration: 2000–2015
- First appearance: 25 May 2000
- Last appearance: 26 October 2015
- Introduced by: Keith Richardson
In-universe information
- Occupation: Personal assistant Factory packer
- Father: Ernest Burrows
- Sisters: Lily Butterfield
- Husband: Harold Birch (backstory)
- Grandmothers: Florence Taylor
- Nephews: Peter Birch
- First cousins: Mildred Finch
- Other relatives: Eve Jenson; Harriet Finch

Edna Birch is a fictional character from the British ITV soap opera Emmerdale, played by Shirley Stelfox. She made her first appearance during the episode first broadcast on 25 May 2000. Edna is characterised as a proud and independent Christian woman who often judges her neighbours' lifestyles. She is recognisable amongst the public for her pudding-basin hat and dog – firstly, Batley the Yorkshire Terrier, followed by Papillon Tootsie. Many of her stories have involved her dogs, including being run over saving Tootsie and the death of Batley, which won an award. The programme established friendships for Edna with many characters of a similar age, and in later years, she was paired with Sandy Thomas (Freddie Jones), which generated many comedic scenes.

Edna's family were also seen at various points. The introduction of her estranged sister, Lily Butterfield (Anne Charleston), created a new story for Edna as it was revealed that her son was in fact her nephew. In 2012, the character of Edna was used to explore the issue of pride amidst financial difficulties. During the story, Edna faces having to pay for Tootsie's medical bills, a burglary at her home, debts and eventually, a collapse.

Stelfox died in December 2015 after portraying Edna for fifteen years. The character's final scenes were broadcast prior to her death, in the episode first broadcast on 26 October, and she was killed off-screen in May 2016. The character and Stelfox's performances were widely praised by viewers and critics alike. Simon Farquhar of The Independent opined that Stelfox had established Edna as "one of the best loved characters on the programme in years".

== Development ==
=== Casting and introduction ===
Stelfox joined the cast of Emmerdale as Edna in 2000. Having established a career working in supporting roles, due to her dislike of committing to long-term roles, Stelfox did not intend to stay with the soap for a long time. However, she found herself enjoying the role and her surroundings, so she stayed, as the actress explained to a reporter from the TV Times in 2013. Stelfox is contracted for a year, which was renewed annually until her death. The actress never expected a new contract and was "always delighted" when she received a new one. She also stated that she had no plans to retire unless she could not remember her lines.

The character made her first appearance in the episode first broadcast on 25 May 2000. Upon her arrival, Edna created "controversy" by campaigning to end a new relationship between local vicar Ashley Thomas and pub landlady Bernice Blackstock. Edna disapproved of the relationship because she viewed Bernice as a "scarlet woman", however she did not manage to prevent them marrying.

=== Characterisation and friendships ===
Edna is a proud, moralistic, independent, private resident of Emmerdale. Although some people perceive her to be judgemental and disapproving of other peoples conduct those who take the time and make the effort to get to know her soon realise her softer side.

— An excerpt from Edna's profile on the official Emmerdale website.

Edna is characterised as a proud and independent woman who often makes judgements of others based on their behaviour. While many will consider her to be judgemental, she has a more caring side which can be unearthed. She will often berate her neighbours for their "hedonistic lifestyles". Edna is extremely loyal and wants to be relied on, disliking having to ask for assistance. Actor Freddie Jones (Sandy Thomas) pointed out that Edna has an "acid tongue" and "never let anybody get away with anything". Scriptwriter Bill Lyons liked writing for the character due to her "tactless" nature and how she would "say all the things you wanted to put into an episode". One of the character's more notable traits is her religious beliefs; she is a devout Christian and spends time helping at the local church. Author Tom Parfitt called Edna the "religious pillar of the community". He added that she is "a fierce, God-fearing little lady, unafraid to take anyone on and put them in their place".

The show's wardrobe department dressed the character in a "pudding-basin" hat and distinctive coat, a costume which Edna became recognisable by. The hat was used to conceal Stelfox's long, blonde hair. Edna was only seen without the hat on two occasions in her entire tenure. Actor Tony Audenshaw deemed it "so profound". The character lives at Woodbine Cottage and is the first known occupant of the house. Prior to retiring, Edna worked for the King family at their haulage company. Nick Miles, who portrays Jimmy King, praised Stelfox and said that she was a "great privilege" to work with.

The character's backstory states that she was married to Harold Birch until his death. They raised Edna's nephew, Peter Birch, as their own son. Her marriage to Harold was explored in 2014 with the introduction of Lawrence White (John Bowe), who had an affair with Harold in the 1960s, before the decriminalisation of homosexuality. When Edna discovered the affair, she reported Laurence to the police and he was imprisoned with Edna presuming he had died. Producer Kate Oates liked the shared backstory between Edna and Lawrence and called it "timely" in relation to public campaigns for pardons towards the men prosecuted for their sexuality. Edna's grandmother was a prostitute, something which Edna finds shameful.

Throughout her time on the soap, Edna develops friendships with characters of a similar age, including Alan Turner (Richard Thorp), Betty Eagleton, Pearl Ladderbanks and Len Reynolds. In later years, the story team paired Edna with Sandy Thomas when he begins lodging with her, despite their contrasting personalities. Jones explained that Sandy sees the importance of his friendship with Edna as he feels "comfortable" with her. He added that the relationship is not "sentimental or smarmy" and they really care for each other. Writers created comical scenes for the duo and gave them walkie talkies to speak to each other after Sandy moves out. Jones praised the "real imagination" behind the "brilliant concept".

=== Dogs ===
Dogs have always been a key aspect to Edna's character. She was originally the owner of a Yorkshire Terrier called Batley, portrayed by Bracken. In the book 50 Years of Emmerdale, Parfitt opined that Batley was "as much a part of Edna as her trademark hat". In February 2002, producers killed off the character as part of "a heart wrenching story". Parfitt noted that Edna was "rocked when her closest companion seemed unwell". Batley's final scene features her placing a paw on Edna's arm as the vet administers a fatal injection. A show spokesperson praised the scenes, commenting, "it was very moving scene and she gave a stunning performance as Batley." Stelfox found the scenes emotional to film and cried for many days afterwards.

Writers decided to introduce a new dog for Edna in the form of Papillon Tootsie, portrayed by Sky. After initially being taken in by vet Paddy Kirk (Dominic Brunt) and his wife Emily Kirk (Kate McGregor), Edna decides to take Tootsie in. In one story, Edna risks her own life to protect Tootsie. After noticing a car driven by Sam Dingle heading towards them, Edna interjects and is thrown into a ditch by impact. Tootsie alerts villagers to Edna and she is taken to hospital, where she learns that she has a broken hip. Sky died in 2008, so the role was recast to Dusty. Stelfox expressed her sadness at Sky's death and called her "a very special dog and a good friend". The actress opined that Dusty has a "very different" personality. In a 2012 interview, Stelfox praised Dusty, calling her "very sweet", and said that she was very good at being silent during filming.

=== Family ===
In 2001, producers introduced Edna's "rebellious" granddaughter Eve Birch, portrayed by Raine Davison, who described her character as "a strong-willed girl". The character was written out in 2002 after five months. Edna's family were further explored in 2006 through the introduction of her son Peter and her estranged sister Lily Butterfield, as well as a guest return for Eve. In the narrative, Edna attends Eve's wedding blessing in France. Peter invites both Edna and Lily without the other's knowledge hoping that they would reconcile. The scenes were filmed in September 2006 and first broadcast over three episodes in November 2006. Neighbours actress Anne Charleston was cast as Lily. Kathleen Beedles, the show's series producer, was excited about Charleston's casting and teased, "expect to see sparks fly when Edna and Lily are reunited". Writers created a secret between the characters of Edna and Lily. On the trip, Edna confides in her friend, Tom King, that Peter is Lily's son who she and Harold raised. Tom encourages Edna to reconcile with Lily and after they speak, Edna considers telling Peter the truth.

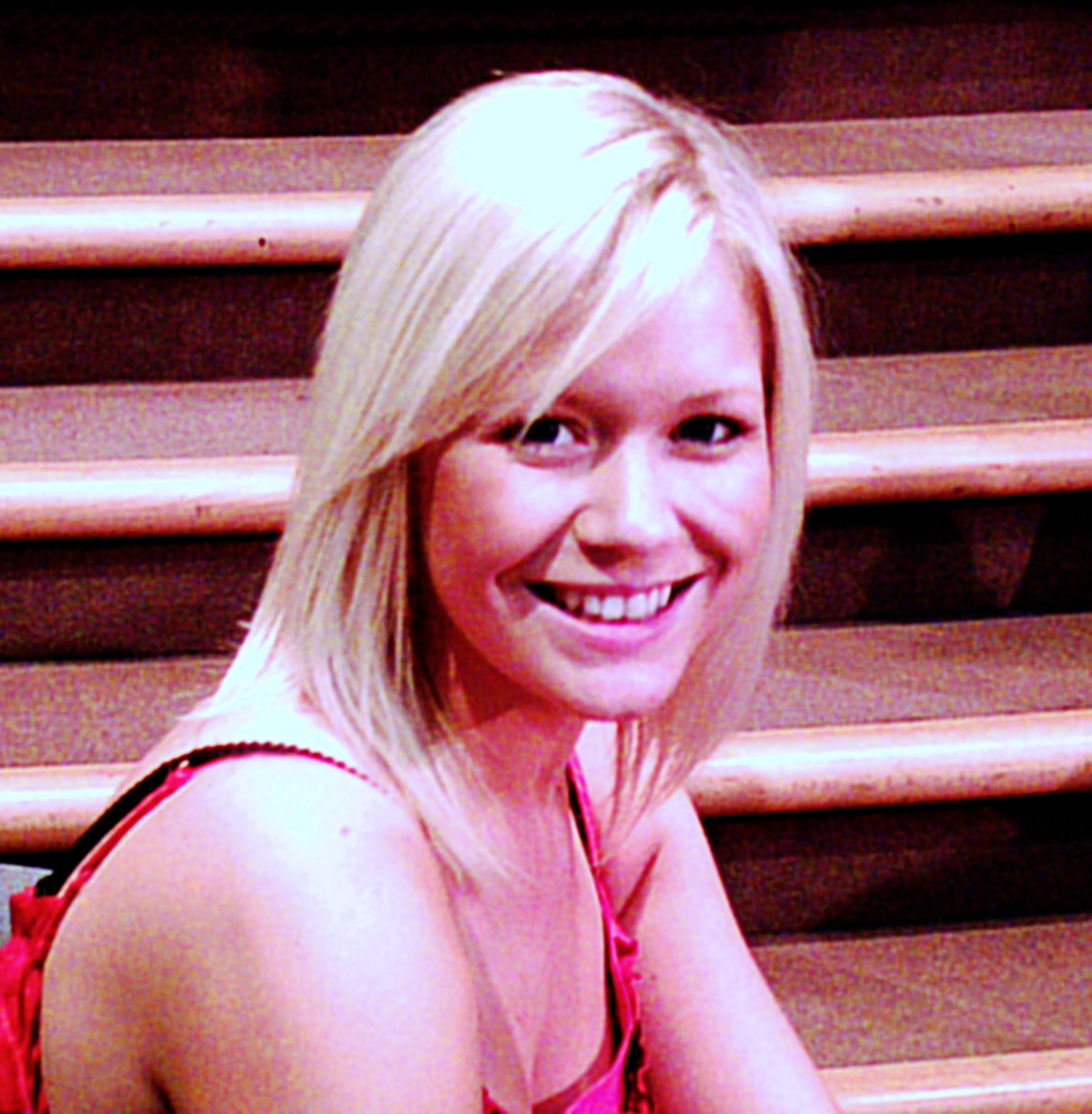
Suzanne Shaw was cast as Edna's granddaughter, Eve Jenson, in 2010.

Following a successful guest stint, Charleston was invited to reprise the role in 2007. The actress looked forward to working with Stelfox again as well as exploring the character's backstory. She remained with the serial for two years, before departing in August 2009. In January 2010, it was announced that Eve would be reintroduced to the serial, with the role recast to Suzanne Shaw. The character was billed as "feisty and flirtatious". Stelfox became the actress' mentor; Shaw praised her and said that she had really supported her. Shaw explained that Eve returns to the village because she knows that Edna is "a real soft touch" and would not turn her away. It soon becomes apparent that Eve left France because her marriage has ended. Shaw pointed out that Edna is displeased to discover that she lied and wants to know the reasons. Edna becomes displeased when Eve does not find a job, so after hearing Moira Barton discuss needing help at her farm, Edna signs Eve up for a job there.

=== Financial issues ===
The show's story team created a new story for Edna in 2012 when she begins to struggle financially. Stelfox felt the story was about pride, rather than financial debt, but thought that it was an important issue to raise nevertheless. She added that Edna would not accept "handouts" from friends as she has worked tirelessly all her life. The actress thought that was a generational thing, but hoped viewers would watch the story and realise that their pride can kill them. She wanted it to encourage people to seek help by just asking those around them. The plot begins when Tootsie is diagnosed with cancer and requires chemotherapy. Stelfox noted that this is a "worrying time" for Edna, who tries to care for Tootsie. Tootsie's medical care is not covered by her insurance and Edna also has to pay for repairs at her home. Stelfox explained that Edna is "too proud" to ask for help and is "not someone who would share her grief or worries". The actress found filming the plot exhausting as she takes herself through the mindset of the character she is playing. She admitted that it can sometimes take days to recover from filming.

Writers continued the story over the Christmas period as Edna struggles to pay for things that would normally not be an issue. One example is when Betty asks Edna to make a pudding, but she worries about the cost of the ingredients. On Christmas Day, Edna returns home from church to find her home robbed. Stelfox described her character as "distraught" and "vulnerable" after finding the burglary. Whilst local vicar Jude Watson (Andy Wear) helps Edna in the aftermath, Ashley notices that something deeper is wrong with Edna. Stelfox pointed out that Ashley recognises Edna's pride as it is something that prevented him asking for help too. Edna nearly confides in Ashley, but then closes off again. Stelfox thought that Edna feels "hungry, lonely and cold" because she has "[shut] everyone out". The actress did not expect Edna to be able to continue with such an attitude, but opined that Ashley or a local charity could be good options to reach out to.

Edna's troubles worsen at the beginning of 2013. On top of pre-existing bills, she has to continue to pay for Tootsie's treatment and repay her credit card. Additionally, she has to buy food for both her and Tootsie in order to keep her well. Stelfox described the start to the new year as "fairly grimly" for her character, and said that "This situation has been a nightmare for Edna". As part of her financial issues, Edna resorts to selling her father's medals. The story concludes when Edna collapses. Stelfox told Daniel Kilkelly from Digital Spy that Edna becomes unwell, but cannot recognise it as "she feels she's tough enough". Neighbours grow concerned for Edna, but she does not realise. When Edna collapses, Jimmy spots her and calls an ambulance. He then invites her to live with him and his wife Nicola. Stelfox explained that Edna finds the situation embarrassing and "very uncomfortable", but accepts the help because she has no other option. Ashley also tries to help Edna, but she is reluctant to accept his support. Stelfox hoped that would change as their relationship has become strained.

=== Departure ===
Stelfox died on 7 December 2015 aged 74 following a short battle with cancer. At the time of her death, she had appeared in the soap for fifteen years. The character's final scenes aired prior to her death. John Whiston, the executive producer at ITV, led a tribute to the actress and stated, "it is hard to imagine Emmerdale without her". He added that he expects that millions will "miss Edna enormously". Jones expressed his sadness at Stelfox's death and told Alison Gardner of What to Watch that he would miss the "lovely working relationship" they shared. Middleton paid tribute to Stelfox when Emmerdale won the British Soap Award for Best British Soap at the 2016 ceremony, the first time they have won the award. He stated that "her heart would have burst with pride" to see the show win.

Plans to kill the character off off-screen were announced in April 2016. Scriptwriter Bill Lyons found it difficult to write about Edna's death, describing it as an "awful" thing to do. Ashley receives a phone call informing him of Edna's death and has to share the news with the rest of the village. Writers explored the impact of Edna's death on her friends. Prior to her death, Edna decided that Ashley should lead her funeral service, which he struggles with as he is experiencing issues with his faith. The character's death has a particular impact on Sandy, who is annoyed that he was not informed about Edna's ill health. Jones compared losing Edna to "a cross between losing a friend and a mother". He added that Sandy feels "heartbroken, but angry" about Edna's death and directs his anger at Ashley because he knew that Edna was unwell. Sandy and Ashley have a big argument in what Jones called "a heavy scene". As part of Edna's death, the walkie-talkies were revisited; Sandy speaks to Edna and tells her that she was not meant to die before him. Jones found the scenes emotional and opined that it managed not to be "mawkish or overly sentimental". The actor created an extra bit in the scene where he says "over", throws the walkie-talkie over his shoulder, before adding "and out". He felt proud of the addition.

== Storylines ==
Having lived in the village for many years, Edna first appears when she opposes the matching of local vicar Ashley Thomas (John Middleton) and pub landlady Bernice Blackstock (Samantha Giles). Edna is pleased when her teenage granddaughter Eve Birch (Raine Davison) comes to live with her, however, Eve becomes involved in a hit-and-run accident with her boyfriend, Marc Reynolds (Anthony Lewis), which kills her teacher. Eve manipulates Edna into believing Marc is a bad influence and Edna refuses to believe stories of Eve's misbehaviour until her friend Betty Eagleton (Paula Tilbrook) spots Eve kicking Edna's beloved dog Batley (Bracken). Finally seeing her true colours, Edna sends Eve back to live with her father, Peter Birch (Philip Bird), in France. Edna is heartbroken when Batley becomes ill and has to be put down; she struggles with his death. When vet Paddy Kirk (Dominic Brunt) finds a homeless dog, Tootsie (Sky/Dusty), he asks Edna to care for her. Despite her initial reluctance, Edna agrees and she brings happiness into her life.

Edna is accidentally run over by Sam Dingle.

Edna befriends Len Reynolds (Peter Martin), who develops feelings for her. She does not reciprocate these feelings and tells Len, although she is displeased when he begins dating Pearl Ladderbanks (Meg Johnson). Edna struggles to warm to Pearl, but is the only person to defend the couple when Pearl's son, convicted rapist Frank Bernard Hartbourne (Rob Parry), comes to live with them. Pearl and Edna bond over the trouble they have with their respective sons and become close friends. When Len dies, Edna is devastated and briefly falls out with Pearl over Len's feelings for Edna. After learning that her grandmother was a prostitute, Edna becomes ashamed and briefly goes into hiding. Whilst walking Tootsie, Edna becomes the victim of a hit-and-run accident, falling into a ditch and breaking her hip. Her lifeless body is discovered by Shadrach Dingle (Andy Devine) who steals from her purse. The blame initially falls onto Cain Dingle (Jeff Hordley) as his car was involved, but Sam Dingle (James Hooton) later admits responsibility.

After needing a new boiler, Edna accepts a loan from local businessman Tom King (Ken Farrington) to buy one. To pay the loan back, Tom suggests that she become his personal assistant as he would prefer someone efficient rather than the glamorous yet incompetent young women favoured by his sons. Edna and Tom soon become close friends and he often turns to her for advice. Edna sometimes found the company challenging to manage, causing her to clash with Tom's sons, Jimmy King (Nick Miles) and Matthew King (Matt Healy), and quit when Tom retired. Edna joins Tom when he starts Home Farm Estates. While she does not always agree with Tom, Edna believes he is a good person and soon falls for him; she is consequently disappointed when he marries Rosemary Sinclair (Linda Thorson).

Peter later arrives in the village to ask his mother to attend Eve's wedded blessing in France. Edna refuses as she resents Peter's rejection of her faith and believes that she failed to care for Eve properly. Edna is persuaded to attend the blessing, where she reunites with her estranged sister, Lily Butterfield (Anne Charleston). Back in the village, Edna confides in Tom that Lily is Peter's biological mother and she adopted him as a baby. Tom uses this information to blackmail her into not revealing his family's involvement in the show home disaster, ending their friendship. Consequently, Edna tells Peter the truth about his parentage, but he does not respond well and rejects Edna. She then resigns from her job working for Tom. Despite this, she is sad to learn of his death soon after. Months later, Tootsie begins to feel unwell and is examined by vet Hari Prasad (John Nayagam), who finds her close to giving birth. Edna is surprised but Tootsie gives birth to two healthy puppies.

Lily arrives in the village and begins to grow cannabis in Home Form's polytunnel, having found it more effective for her arthritis than prescription medicines. The police invade Edna's home and arrest Lily, so Edna evicts Lily in disgust. Lily later returns and during an argument, Edna admits that she resents her sister for being adventurous; they reconcile. Lily and her colleagues win a car worth £15,000 but Peter returns and makes Lily feel guilty, so she gives him the winning ticket. Edna asks Peter to pay back the money but he refuses and explains that he feels that Lily owes him. Edna then tells Lily that he has agreed to pay the money back, but instead, she withdraws the money from her savings. Weeks later, Edna becomes suspicious of the relationship between Lily and Rodney Blackstock (Patrick Mower), especially when they disappear together. Rodney informs Edna that Lily has a brain aneurysm and has fled hospital before surgery. Although she is hurt over her sister's secrecy, Edna convinces Lily to have the operation and asks her to move in with her while she recuperates. However, Lily soon feels smothered and moves back in with Pearl.

When the King brothers start their own haulage business, Edna offers her help to receptionist Scarlett Nicholls (Kelsey-Beth Crossley). However, she impresses Jimmy, who asks her to work for them; Edna agrees and they get along well. Jimmy needlessly worries that Edna has a crush on him. Edna and Scarlett bond and they bake a pie together for Scarlett to give to her boyfriend Daz Eden (Luke Tittensor). Edna soon realises that she has lost her wedding ring, which Daz finds in the pie. Despite Daz initially thinking that Scarlett was proposing marriage, Edna retrieves her ring. After learning that the church will be closing, Edna and other villagers start a choir. She also takes in Nicola De Souza (Nicola Wheeler) when she becomes homeless, but kicks her out after discovering that Nicola, David Metcalfe (Matthew Wolfenden) and Eric Pollard (Chris Chittell) have been plotting to sabotage the choir and buy and demolish the church. Edna has to miss the choir competition to be with Lily at the hospital and despite their win, Bishop George informs the choir that the church will still close. Edna, a reformed Nicola and other parishioners are furious and stage a lock-in on Christmas Day, convincing Eric and David not to buy the church. Mark Wylde (Maxwell Caulfield) and Natasha Wylde (Amanda Donohoe) buy the church but gift it to the village.

Sally Spode (Siân Reeves) begins lodging with Edna after being evicted by Ashley. Sally explains that she is terrified of her husband, vicar Vincent Spode (Antony Byrne), who beats her, so Edna suggests that Sally move in permanently. Sally smashes Edna's window and claims that Vincent did it, horrifying Edna, who later discovered the truth. When Sally accuses Ashley of abusing and torturing her, Edna informs Bishop George, who suspends Ashley pending investigation. Sally's true colours are revealed, so Edna apologises to Ashley and confronts Sally, accusing her of torturing Ashley not vice versa. Sally later trashes the vicarage, shocking Edna and Ashley. Edna hates being fooled by Sally and confides in Betty, but she spreads the story around the village.

Eve (now played by Suzanne Shaw) returns to the village to live with Edna, delighting her. She struggles to find work, so Edna arranges her to start work as a farmhand at Moira Barton's (Natalie J. Robb) farm. The following year, Edna, Pearl and Betty are involved in a fire which runs through the village. Eve later leaves the village to start a life in Mexico, which pleases Edna. After Tootsie is diagnosed with spleen cancer, Jimmy encourages Edna to retire and spend time with her, which she decides to do. Having stopped working and spent lots of money on Tootsie's vet care, Edna struggles financially, peaking when Jimmy finds her unconscious due to not being able to afford heating or food. Edna tries to hide her financial issues, but recovers after support from the community. Ashley's father, Sandy Thomas (Freddie Jones), becomes her lodger after needing a new home and to give Edna an income source. They become close and are joined by Ashley and Edna's relative, Harriet Finch (Katherine Dow Blyton), when she moves to the village.

Following the death of his daughter Gemma Andrews (Tendai Rinomhota), Edna befriends and supports Dominic Andrews (Wil Johnson). When Edna wins money on a scratch card, she anonymously leaves Dominic an envelope of money, which he uses to leave the village. Edna develops a friendship with Aaron Livesy (Danny Miller), who is openly gay, and reveals to him that her dead husband, Harold Birch, was also gay and married her out of "convenience", since homosexuality was a crime in the United Kingdom at the time. She explains that Harold had a lover, Lawrence White (John Bowe), and she is jealous that Harold could never love her in the same way. Edna then admits to Sandy that she reported Lawrence to the police and he killed himself in prison. Sandy tries locating Lawrence's grave in hope of giving Edna closure, but is shocked to discover that Lawrence is still alive. Lawrence visits Edna and they make peace, although she struggles when he and his family move to the village. Edna is devastated to find her house robbed and her pension missing. It emerges that Belle Dingle (Eden Taylor-Draper) stole the money in a schizophrenia episode.

Edna goes to stay with Lily in Bournemouth to conceal the fact that she has been diagnosed with ovarian cancer. A few months later, Ashley receives a phone call from the hospital informing him that Edna's condition has worsened. Ashley and Laurel then go to the hospital and return with Tootsie, breaking the news that Edna has died. Her death devastates her friends, particularly Sandy who is annoyed that he could not say goodbye. Edna's funeral is held a week later, conducted by Harriet, who also takes care of Tootsie. Sandy says a private goodbye to Edna using their walkie-talkies.

== Reception ==
Batley's death won the award for Best Exit at the 2002 British Soap Awards. Stelfox collected the accolade with Bracken and they were greeted with a standing ovation from the audience. Julie MacCaskill of the Daily Record described Batley's death as "a sentimental story", while her colleague called Edna and Batley's relationship an "endearing love story". A reporter from Holy Soap listed Edna being involved in a hit-and-run accident with Sam Dingle as her memorable moment. Kilkelly (Digital Spy) called the character "no-nonsense" and "a fair but formidable presence in the village". He chose Edna moving into Jimmy's home as his Picture of the day feature for 27 February 2013. For the character's financial difficulties story, Stelfox received a positive response from the audience, who expressed their hope that Edna would seek help. She had one person inform her that their child had asked them to pass his pocket money to Edna because she has no food.

The character's hat attracted attention from fans of the soap. The Liverpool Echo printed a poem on 24 August 2004 written by George Flannery in dedication to the character's hat. In the poem, Flannery described Edna as "a grumpy mad old bat". In 2012, three cast members – Dominic Brunt (Paddy Kirk), Tom Lister (Carl King) and Sian Reese-Williams (Gennie Walker) – created a folk rock band with two other friends. The band was named "Edna's Hat" in reference to the character's hat.

Duncan Lindsey of the Metro thought that Edna is best known for "her sharp lines, her officious hat and her love for her dogs Batley and Tootsie". He liked her friendship with Sandy and described it as "close and endearing". Both Lindsay and the Daily Record's Rick Fulton labelled Edna a "battleaxe". Jon Wise of The People dubbed Edna a "village gossip". The Guardian's Anthony Hayward described the character as "Emmerdale's preacher of morals, the prudish, churchgoing Edna Birch, who always spoke her mind", adding that she is "prim [and] matronly". He believed that the character's hat added to her "hard-faced exterior". Hayward opined that Stelfox had "moulded a much-loved soap character". On Stelfox's portrayal of Edna, Simon Farquhar, writing for The Independent, commented, "Playing that soap evergreen, the moralising busybody, she made the prudish and judgemental spinster Edna Birch one of the best loved characters on the programme in years".

== Bibliography ==
- Parfitt, Tom (2022). 50 Years of Emmerdale. London: Octopus Publishing Group. ISBN 978-1-78840-316-0.
