= The Way to Your Love =

2001 single by Hear'Say

Single by Hear'Say

from the album Popstars
- Released: 25 June 2001
- Studio: StarGate (Norway)
- Length: 3:15
- Label: Polydor
- Songwriters: Mikkel SE; Hallgeir Rustan; Tor Erik Hermansen
- Producer: StarGate

Hear'Say singles chronology
"Pure and Simple" (2001)	"The Way to Your Love" (2001)	"Everybody" (2001)

Alternative cover
- CD 2 single cover

"The Way to Your Love" is the second single from British pop group Hear'Say, the winners of the UK version of Popstars. The song was written and produced by Norwegian production team StarGate and was released as the second and final single from Hear'Say's debut studio album, Popstars (2001), on 25 June 2001.

"The Way to Your Love" debuted at number one on the UK Singles Chart with first-week sales of 75,514 copies. Despite the success of the group's debut single, "Pure and Simple", "The Way to Your Love" spent only one week at the top of the chart and sold only a tenth of their first record's sales; it was the second-lowest-selling number-one single of 2001 that did not reach number one in 2000.

== Track listings ==
UK CD1

1. "The Way to Your Love" (Jiant radio edit)
2. "Look Inside Yourself"
3. "Pure and Simple" (Jewels & Stone remix)
4. "The Way to Your Love" (video CD ROM)

UK CD2

1. "The Way to Your Love" (Jiant radio edit)
2. "Boogie Wonderland"
3. "Brand New Day"

UK cassette single

1. "The Way to Your Love" (Jiant radio edit)
2. "Pure and Simple" (karaoke version)

== Credits and personnel ==
Credits are lifted from the Popstars album booklet.

Studios

- Recorded and mixed at StarGate Studios (Norway)
- Mastered at Transfermation (London, England)

Personnel

- StarGate – production
  - Mikkel SE – writing, all instruments
  - Hallgeir Rustan – writing, all instruments
  - Tor Erik Hermansen – writing, all instruments
- Hear'Say – all vocals
- Richard Dowling – mastering

== Charts ==
=== Weekly charts ===
Chart (2001)	Peak position
Europe (Eurochart Hot 100)	9
Ireland (IRMA)	10
New Zealand (Recorded Music NZ)	44
Scotland (OCC)	1
UK Singles (OCC)	1
UK Airplay (Music Week)	8

=== Year-end charts ===
Chart (2001)	Position
Ireland (IRMA)	97
UK Singles (OCC)	55

== Certifications ==
Region	Certification	Certified units/sales
United Kingdom (BPI)	Silver	200,000^{^}
^{^} Shipments figures based on certification alone.
