= Boom! (group) =

English pop group

- Origin: England
- Genres: Pop
- Years active: 2000–2002
- Label: London Records
- Past members: Johnny Shentall; Rachael Carr; Shakti Edwards; Kevin Kehl; Vicky Palmer; Nick Donaghy; Shaun Angel

Boom! were an English pop group which consisted of members Johnny Shentall, Rachael Carr, Kevin Kehl, Shakti Edwards, Vicky Palmer, Nick Donaghy and Shaun Angel.

== Biography ==
Their garage-pop debut single "Falling" was released in late 2000 and reached number 11 on the UK Singles Chart in January 2001.

Can't Stop the Pop described the song as "an incredibly clean-sounding track; it's slick and light on its feet, which is perfectly in-line with the sort of material being peddled by Artful Dodger, but perhaps a little throwaway by pop – and debut single – standards." They then went on to say: "Perhaps more than was evident at the time, since their brand of garage-pop was not a million miles from that of Liberty X, who would launch later that year. Perhaps, however, in early-2001, there just wasn't enough to convince London Records that garage wasn't a passing fad. Nonetheless, 'Falling' is a quality track and – even if we didn't know it at the time – an incredibly accurate indication of things to come."

The group went on tour with boy band Westlife. Member Johnny Shentall went on to join Hear'Say in 2002 as a replacement for Kym Marsh.

== Discography ==
=== Singles ===
- 2000: "Falling" - UK #11
