= Falling (Boom! song) =

2001 song performed by Boom!

Single by Boom!
- Released: 2000
- Recorded: 2000
- Genre: Garage-pop
- Label: London Records
- Songwriter(s): Lucas Secon, Keith Richard Cox, Gary Lloyd, Rhoden
- Producer(s): Lucas Secon

"Falling" is the debut single by English pop group Boom!, released in late 2000. The song was a hit, peaking at No. 11 on the UK Singles Chart in January 2001.

Can't Stop the Pop described the song as "an incredibly clean-sounding track; it's slick and light on its feet, which is perfectly in-line with the sort of material being peddled by Artful Dodger, but perhaps a little throwaway by pop – and debut single – standards." They then went on to say: "Perhaps more than was evident at the time, since their brand of garage-pop was not a million miles from that of Liberty X, who would launch later that year. Perhaps, however, in early-2001, there just wasn't enough to convince London Records that garage wasn't a passing fad. Nonetheless, 'Falling' is a quality track and – even if we didn't know it at the time – an incredibly accurate indication of things to come."

== Track listing ==
UK CD single CD 1

1. "Falling" – 3:22
2. "Boy Versus Girl" – 3:17
3. "Boy Versus Girl (Darude vs. JS16 Remix) – 8:09

UK CD single CD 2

1. "Falling" – 3:20
2. "Flipside" – 3:08
3. "Falling" (Paul "Sweet P" Watson Remix) – 6:25
4. Music video
