= All Dressed Up (film) =

1918 film

- Directed by: Al Christie
- Written by: Al Christie
- Produced by: Al Christie
- Starring: Betty Compson
- Release date: May 22, 1918
- Running time: 2 reels
- Country: USA
- Language: Silent..English titles

All Dressed Up is a 1918 silent film short produced and directed by Al Christie. It starred Betty Compson. It is currently considered a lost film.

== Cast ==
- Betty Compson
- Dorothy Dane
- Harry Edwards

== See also ==
- Betty Compson filmography
