= All Dressed Up (song) =

2015 single by Lauren Harries

Single by Lauren Harries
- Released: 1 May 2015
- Genre: Pop
- Length: 3:28
- Label: Erlectro Music
- Songwriter: Edward Russell
- Producer: Edward Russell

Lauren Harries singles chronology
| "I Am a Woman" (2015) | "All Dressed Up" (2015) | "Upadoo" (2018) |

Music video
- "All Dressed Up" on YouTube

"All Dressed Up" is a song by English media personality Lauren Harries. It was written and produced by Edward Russell and was released by Erlectro Music on 1 May 2015.

The lyrical content of "All Dressed Up" was initially composed Harries' appearance on Celebrity Big Brother in 2013, when she sang in the house about being "all dressed up with nowhere to go". Harries has also stated that it was partly inspired by the alleged fling she had with Russell Brand.

== Background and release ==
In January 2015, Harries released her debut single "I Am a Woman". She subsequently announced "All Dressed Up" as her follow up single and it was released on 1 May 2015 through Erlectro Music. It was written and produced by Edward Russell, who worked on her previous single. The lyrics for the song were first composed by Harries during her appearance on Celebrity Big Brother in 2013, when she sang in the house about being "all dressed up with nowhere to go". Harries later said the song was inspired by the alleged fling she had with Russell Brand.

== Music video ==
An accompanying music video was released alongside the single, filmed at the Sunflower&I restaurant in Mount Stuart Square in Cardiff. It features Harries performing in front of a man playing the piano and a group of people dining at the restaurant. Harries is seen reading tarot cards and revealing one to the shock of the diners. She is then seen dancing alongside them in another and takes two of the men hostage, tying them up and kissing one of them as they attempt to escape. Once they do, one of the men holds the gun to Harries as she sits on the other man's lap whilst she applies lipstick. Another scene sees Harries holding a gun whilst sitting in a chair as the diners dance around her. It concludes with Harries back at the piano, receiving a round of applause from the audience as she finishes the song.

== Personnel ==
Credits adapted from Apple Music.

- Lauren Harries – vocals
- Edward Russell – production, songwriting

== Release history ==
| Region | Date | Format | Label | Ref. |
|---|---|---|---|---|
| Various | 1 May 2015 | Digital download, streaming | Erlectro Records | |
