= The Salon (TV series) =

British reality TV show

- Genre: Reality
- Narrated by: Ben Crystal (first series); Brian Dowling (second series)
- Country of origin: United Kingdom
- Original language: English
- No. of series: 2

Production
- Running time: Varies
- Production company: Endemol UK Productions

Original release
- Network: Channel 4 E4
- Release: 12 January 2003 – 4 March 2004

Related
- Celebrity Scissorhands

The Salon is a British interactive reality TV show set in a beauty salon in London, which first aired on Channel 4 in 2003. Various members of the public (some famous) were invited daily to have treatments (mostly hair styles) in a studio built beauty salon situated in Balham, south-west London, and in the second series, a purpose-built studio inside the Trocadero, Piccadilly Circus.

== Overview ==
Everything going on in the salon was filmed. While all beauty treatments were free of charge, customers had to agree to appear on television. Beauty treatments on the show ranged from haircuts and Botox injections, to collagen implants and colonic irrigation.

Viewers were given an insight into the running and bickering of life in a professional salon with manager Paul Merritt and his team of trainees and employees. The show was most notable for bringing fame to Brazilian-born hairstylist, Ricardo Ribeiro and introducing viewers to Sharon and Ozzy Osbourne's nephew, Terry Longden.

== Guests ==
Some of the show's celebrity guests included Linford Christie, Cheryl Baker, Carrie Grant, Linsey Dawn McKenzie, Simeon Williams, Brigitte Nielsen, Val Lehman, Kristian Nairn, Michael Barrymore, and Lucy Pinder, Denise Pearson, Rory Bremner, Shane Connor, Danni Behr, Donna Eyre, Neil Pickup and Michael Heseltine. Kat Chaplin

== Reception ==
The first episode had 1.9 million viewers, a 7% share of the total.
