= St Gabriel's Roman Catholic High School, Bury =

UK coeducational Roman Catholic secondary school in Bury, Greater Manchester

St Gabriel's RC High School

Location
- Bridge Road; Bury, Greater Manchester, BL9 0TZ; England; 53°35′20″N 2°18′22″W

Information
- Type: Academy
- Motto: The Lord is my Strength
- Religious affiliation: Roman Catholic
- Established: 1954; 72 years ago Academy: 2020
- Local authority: Bury
- Trust: St Teresa of Calcutta Catholic Academy Trust
- Department for Education URN: 148049 Tables
- Ofsted: Reports
- Chair of local governing body: Fiona Robinson
- Head: Simon Braithwaite
- Gender: Coeducational
- Age: 11 to 16
- Language: English
- Hours in school day: 6
- Houses: 8
- Colours: Navy blue & gold
- Publication: Pronuntio (until 2019)
- Alumni: Old Gabrians
- Website: www.stgabrielshigh.stoccat.org.uk

St Gabriel's Roman Catholic High School is a coeducational Roman Catholic secondary school located in Bury, Greater Manchester, England. Founded in 1954, it became an academy sponsored by the St Teresa of Calcutta Catholic Academy Trust in 2020.

== History ==
The main school building was opened in 1954. From 1954 to 2020, it was a voluntary aided school administered by Bury Metropolitan Borough Council, and later gained status as a specialist Science College. The school celebrated its Diamond anniversary in 2014, which was marked by a visit by the Bishop of Salford. The school's publication, Pronuntio (lit. I pronounce in Latin), had been published for many years but the final issue was produced in December 2019. In November 2020, the school became an academy school sponsored by the St Teresa of Calcutta Catholic Academy Trust.

The school's Form classes are named after Roman Catholic saints and martyrs from Lancashire and North West England and consist of Arrowsmith, Lyne, Southworth, Ward, Barlow, Clitheroe, Plessington and Rigby. Two of the form classes (Ward and Rigby) were added during the 1990s and two more (Mayne and Jones) added in the 2000s. The latter two form classes ceased to be used for Year Seven students beginning in 2019, and were dissolved school-wide in 2020, with those previously in the forms being moved to other classes.

== School Facilities ==
The School buildings include: the Main Building; the School Library and Centre; the St Teresa of Calcutta Chapel; the Drama and Performance Arts Complex (typically referred to as the Paul Hopkins Building); a Gymnasium and Sports Hall and the shared English/Art Complex (connected to the P.H building) which is commonly known within the school as ‘Doc’s Block’ in memory of a former teacher.
