= Hear'Say =

British pop group

- The original lineup of Hear'Say in 2001 (L–R): Noel Sullivan, Kym Marsh, Myleene Klass, Suzanne Shaw and Danny Foster

Background information
- Origin: London, England
- Genre: Pop
- Years active: 2000–2002; 2026–present
- Labels: MCA; Polydor; Island
- Members: Danny Foster; Kym Marsh; Suzanne Shaw; Noel Sullivan
- Past members: Myleene Klass; Johnny Shentall
- Website: kilimanjarolive.co.uk/hear-say

Hear'Say are a British pop group. They were formed in November 2000 through the ITV reality TV show Popstars, the first UK series of the international Popstars franchise, and unveiled to the public on 3 February 2001. The group, who were signed to Polydor Records, originally consisted of Danny Foster, Myleene Klass, Kym Marsh, Suzanne Shaw, and Noel Sullivan.

Hear'Say achieved instant fame, breaking chart records with their debut single "Pure and Simple" and the album Popstars. However, their second album failed to match this success.

In January 2002, Marsh left Hear'Say due to conflicts with Klass and Sullivan. She was replaced by former Boom! member Johnny Shentall a month later. During a summer promotional tour, Hear'Say were constantly harassed by members of the public. "Lovin' Is Easy", the group's only single to be released with Shentall, failed to make a commercial impact. Hear'Say announced their split in October 2002, twenty months after their formation, citing "abuse from the public" as the main reason for their demise. After the band's break-up, all of the members went on to achieve individual success elsewhere in the entertainment industry.

In October 2026, four of the original members – Foster, Marsh, Shaw and Sullivan – reformed for an arena tour with Liberty X taking place from 17 April 2027 to 12 May 2027.

== History ==
=== 2000–2001: Formation, Popstars and touring ===
Over the course of six weeks in late 2000, thousands of hopeful singers attended open television auditions for ITV's Popstars talent show. The contestants were judged by Nigel Lythgoe, Paul Adam (director of A&R at Polydor Records, who had rights to the finished group), and Nicki Chapman, who had worked with the Spice Girls. The judges reduced the contestants to a group of ten, before visiting each of them at their homes to reveal whether or not they had been selected for the group. The five chosen singers – Danny Foster, Myleene Klass, Kym Marsh, Suzanne Shaw, and Noel Sullivan – formed Hear'Say. The five unsuccessful finalists went on to form the group Liberty (later renamed Liberty X after a legal dispute). The programme documented Hear'Say recording and promoting their first single with the series ending on the night the single charted in the UK Singles Chart at number 1. Popstars became an instant success, taking in audiences of over 10 million viewers.

In March 2001, Hear'Say released their first single, "Pure and Simple", a cover of a little-known album track by Girl Thing. The song went straight to number one on the UK Singles Chart in March 2001, selling just under 550,000 copies. "Pure and Simple" was the fastest-selling debut single at the time, as well as the fastest-selling non-charity single – a record beaten a year later by Pop Idol winner Will Young. The track spent two more weeks at number one. With the release of their debut album Popstars, Hear'Say became the first act in UK chart history to simultaneously top the UK Singles Chart and UK Albums Chart with their debut releases. Popstars sold 306,631 copies in its first week, breaking yet another record for fastest-selling debut album. The album featured cover versions of "Monday Monday" by the Mamas & the Papas and "Bridge over Troubled Water" by Simon & Garfunkel, alongside original tracks purchased for the group.

Hear'Say released their second single, "The Way to Your Love", in June 2001. The song became their second consecutive number-one single. The group were invited to perform at the 80th birthday celebrations of Prince Philip, Duke of Edinburgh. Hear'Say went on to present their own ITV show called Hear'Say It's Saturday, which featured performances, comedy sketches and celebrity guests. This followed on from a mini-series named Meet the Popstars which was intended to allow the public to get to know the group and their music away from the talent show format. In August 2001, Hear'Say embarked on their first tour, the Popstars 2001 Tour, throughout the United Kingdom. They initially announced five dates which quickly sold out, causing the group to schedule thirty more dates throughout August and September. However, the new dates struggled to sell out as hundreds of tickets remained unsold. The group also released a live DVD Hear'say Live.

=== 2001–2002: Everybody, line-up changes, decline and break-up ===
Whilst on tour, the group began recording their second studio album, Everybody. In November 2001, Hear'Say released the album's title track as the lead single, with the album following a week later, just over eight months after the release of their debut album. The single debuted at number four, while the album crept into the chart at number 24. Everybody went on to sell just one fifth as many copies as Popstars. Despite the second album's lack of success, it did achieve Gold status by the BPI but over a decade after its release and plans were made for an arena tour, due to begin in September 2002.

During this time, tabloids began reporting that Marsh, who had gained attention due to her relationship with former EastEnders actor Jack Ryder, had left the band following feuds with bandmate Klass. A representative for Hear'Say denied the reports, stating: "Everybody who is involved with Hear'Say will be sitting down this week to discuss the future. Kym Marsh is still with the band." However, in January 2002, Marsh announced that she was leaving Hear'Say, later revealing she often fought with Klass and Sullivan. Auditions were held to find Marsh's replacement.

The audition process was televised in segments of This Morning, an ITV daily morning show, mirroring the procedure during which the original members of Hear'Say were chosen. Johnny Shentall, husband of Steps singer Lisa Scott-Lee, won the auditions, joining the group on 5 February 2002. Controversy erupted when it was found out that Shentall had previously been a member of short-lived pop group Boom!, and press alleged that he had previously been a back-up dancer for Hear'Say, which the group denied. In March 2002, Hear'Say cancelled their planned arena tour to begin recording their third album and allow Shentall time to "settle in" to the group.

During the summer of 2002, the group toured the UK radio roadshows circuit, where they were constantly booed and abused by members of the public, with a performance in Brighton being cut short due to the animosity concerned – evidence of the degree of public animosity that had built up. During the tour, the group's vehicle was threatened by an apparently armed man at a motorway service area on the M1 motorway in Leicestershire. The man, later arrested, claimed to have been playing a prank on the group. In August 2002, Hear'Say released their only single with Shentall, entitled "Lovin' Is Easy". The track had a new sophisticated feel in an attempt to regenerate interest in the group's music. The single became Hear'Say's lowest charting single to date when it peaked at number six. Media reports suggested that Polydor Records wanted the single to at least reach the UK Top 5. Following the disappointing sales of the single, it was thought that they would be dropped by the label, though no official word came from Polydor.

Hear'Say split up on 1 October 2002, citing "abuse from the public" as the main reason. The group admitted to being a fad that had passed. Hear'Say's popularity had been eclipsed by that of Liberty X, a band composed of the five other finalists of Popstars.

=== 2026–present: Reunion ===
On 1 October 2026, precisely 24 years after their split, the group teased a reunion with four of the original members: Foster, Marsh, Shaw and Sullivan. Klass had said three months prior that she would be unable to take part in a reunion with the group due to her work and family commitments; she reiterated this point during an appearance on Loose Women on 5 October, but added that she would "never say never". On 8 October, the group announced that they would be embarking on a joint arena tour with Liberty X, Popstars: The Originals, in April and May 2027.

== Discography ==
=== Albums ===
List of albums, with selected details, chart positions and certifications
Title	Details	Peak chart positions					Certifications
Title	Details	UK	EUR	IRE	NZ	SCO	Certifications
Popstars	Released: 26 March 2001; Label: Polydor (#549821); Formats: CS, CD	1	10	4	1	1	UK: 3× Platinum; EUR: Platinum; NZ: Platinum
Everybody	Released: 3 December 2001; Label: Polydor (#589541); Formats: CS, CD	24	—	—	—	23	UK: Gold
"—" denotes a recording that did not chart or was not released in that territory.

=== Singles ===
List of singles, with selected chart positions and certifications
Title	Year	Peak chart positions								Certifications	Album
Title	Year	UK	AUS	EUR	GER	IRE	NZ	SCO	SWI	Certifications	Album
"Pure and Simple"	2001	1	72	6	83	3	1	1	29	UK: 2× Platinum; NZ: Gold	Popstars
"The Way to Your Love"	2001	1	—	9	—	10	44	1	—	UK: Silver	Popstars
"Everybody"	2001	4	—	21	—	23	—	2	—		Everybody
"Lovin' Is Easy"	2002	6	—	35	—	31	—	7	—		Non-album single
"—" denotes a recording that did not chart or was not released in that territory.

== Tours ==
- Popstars 2001 Tour (2001)
- Popstars: The Originals (2027) (with Liberty X)

== Members ==
- Kym Marsh (2000–2002, 2026–present)
- Danny Foster (2000–2002, 2026–present)
- Suzanne Shaw (2000–2002, 2026–present)
- Noel Sullivan (2000–2002, 2026–present)
- Myleene Klass (2000–2002)
- Johnny Shentall (2002)

== Filmography ==
- Popstars (2001)
- ITV Panto: Dick Whittington (2002)
