= Noel Sullivan =

Welsh singer and actor (born 1980)

- Born: 28 July 1980 (age 46); Cardiff, Wales
- Genres: Pop; dance
- Occupations: Singer; actor
- Instrument: Vocals
- Years active: 2000–present
- Labels: MCA; Polydor
- Member of: Hear'Say

Noel Sullivan (born 28 July 1980) is a Welsh singer and actor, who is best known as a member of the British pop group Hear'Say, formed through the ITV talent show Popstars.

== Career ==
=== 2001-2002 ===
Sullivan auditioned in 2001 for the first series of the reality television documentary Popstars broadcast on ITV. He impressed the show's expert judges (who included Nigel Lythgoe and Nicki Chapman) enough to win selection as a founder member of the pop group Hear'Say, alongside Danny Foster, Myleene Klass, Kym Marsh and Suzanne Shaw.

After the formation of the group Sullivan gave up a part-time job as a waiter to move to London. Hear'Say went on to sell about three million records worldwide. The group's debut single "Pure and Simple" became the fastest selling number one single of the UK Singles Chart at the time. The group also released another UK number one single and a number one album, as well as performing a sell out arena tour across the UK and Ireland. The group disbanded 18 months later after four singles and two album releases.

=== 2003–2012 ===
After the split of Hear'Say, Sullivan appeared in several musical theatre productions including Fame, Love Shack and What a Feeling and performed at the Royal Gala opening of the Wales Millennium Centre. In 2003, Sullivan appeared in Grease as Danny Zuko opposite Claire Buckfield as Sandy and Amanda-Jane Manning as Rizzo at the Jersey Opera House. In 2006, Sullivan briefly returned to reality television in Trust Me – I'm a Holiday Rep, broadcast on Five. Sullivan then moved to the United States for 18 months, working in Las Vegas hosting Simply Ballroom and then moving to Reno and Branson as part of the Twelve Irish Tenors. Starting in July 2008, Sullivan played the lead male role in the world premier production of Flashdance. From November 2009, he starred in the West End theatre production of Grease as the male lead, Danny Zuko.

Sullivan made a cameo appearance in Gavin & Stacey broadcast on BBC One on 1 January 2010. Sullivan sang with Jessica Cervi and Sarah O'Connor in the final of RTÉ One's Fame: The Musical in Dublin on 13 June 2010. Sullivan played the lead role of Galileo Figaro in the 2011 UK tour of We Will Rock You. Sullivan took over from Alex Gaumond in the lead role of Galileo in We Will Rock You in the West End Production of the musical at the Dominion Theatre. The role reunited Sullivan with his former Grease co-star, Lauren Samuels, who plays Scaramouche in the show.

=== 2013–present ===
Beginning in May 2013, Sullivan shared the role of Tick/Mitzi with Jason Donovan in the UK tour of Priscilla, Queen of the Desert.

Sullivan played Freddy in the 2015/16 UK Tour of Dirty Rotten Scoundrels.

In 2016, Sullivan co-starred in the second series of the BBC drama Ordinary Lies. He starred in the UK premier of It's Only Life at The Union Theatre in London, in 2018. In 2019, Sullivan featured in the BBC series Years and Years. That same year, Sullivan was a guest on Heston's Marvellous Menu: Back to the Noughties in which chef Heston Blumenthal recreated The Fat Duck restaurant as it was in 2001. In July 2025, Sullivan starred as Prince Charles in musical The Diana Mixtape.

On 1 October 2026, precisely 24 years after Hear'Say's split, the group teased a reunion with four of the original members: Foster, Marsh, Shaw and Sullivan. On 8 October, the group announced that they would be embarking on a joint arena tour with Liberty X, Popstars: The Originals, in April and May 2027.

== Personal life ==
In 2017, Sullivan came out as gay on Instagram and announced that he had married his partner.
