= Danny Foster (musician) =

- Born: 3 May 1979 (age 47); Hackney, London, England
- Genres: Pop; dance; soul
- Occupation: Singer
- Instrument: Vocals
- Years active: 2000–present
- Labels: MCA Music; Polydor
- Member of: Hear'Say

Danny Foster (born 3 May 1979) is a British singer and television personality, who is best known as a member of the pop group Hear'Say.

== Early life and career ==
Foster attended the Central Foundation Boys' School. Before his appearance in the Popstars television series, he had worked as a cleaner and trained as a youth worker.

Foster first came to public attention in 2001, after his appearance as an aspiring pop singer in the first series of the television talent series Popstars, which aired on ITV1. Impressing the judges of the series (which included Nigel Lythgoe and Nicki Chapman), Foster was selected as a member of the pop group Hear'Say, alongside Myleene Klass, Kym Marsh, Suzanne Shaw and Noel Sullivan.

After the formation of the group, Hear'Say went on to enjoy international success, selling nearly three million records worldwide. The group's debut single "Pure and Simple" became the fastest selling number one single of the UK Singles Chart at the time. The group released another UK number one single and a number one album, as well as performing a sell out arena tour across the UK and Ireland. However, the group's second album was not a success, and Hear'Say split eighteen months after their formation.

In 2005, Foster competed in the third series of Channel 4 sports-based reality show The Games. Foster joined the series halfway through as a replacement for injured actor Jonathon Morris, and competed against celebrities including Craig Charles and Chesney Hawkes.

In 2006, Foster appeared as a celebrity contestant in Five's Trust Me – I'm a Beauty Therapist, appearing alongside celebrities including Suzi Quatro, Stan Boardman and Michelle Marsh.

== Recent career ==
As of 2019, Foster performs as part of his own group, "Danny Foster & The Big Soul Corporation". The act consists of live performances of mainly soul & Motown songs, with Foster performing as lead singer.

Foster auditioned for The Voice UK in 2013 with his own soul version of the Spice Girls hit "Wannabe", but was not chosen by any of the judges.

On 1 October 2026, precisely 24 years after Hear'Say's split, the group teased a reunion with four of the original members: Foster, Marsh, Shaw and Sullivan. On 8 October, the group announced that they would be embarking on a joint arena tour with Liberty X, Popstars: The Originals, in April and May 2027.
