= Pure and Simple (song) =

2001 single by Hear'Say

Single by Hear'Say

from the album Popstars
- B-side: "Bridge over Troubled Water"
- Released: 12 March 2001
- Studio: Mayfair, The Strongroom (London, England)
- Length: 3:47
- Label: Polydor
- Songwriters: Tim Hawes; Pete Kirtley; Alison Clarkson
- Producer: Jiant

Hear'Say singles chronology
"Pure and Simple" (2001)	"The Way to Your Love" (2001)

"Pure and Simple" is a song by the British pop group Hear'Say, the winners of the UK version of Popstars. It was a cover of the original version recorded three years earlier by the British-Dutch girl group Girl Thing, who were dropped from BMG before the song was given to Hear'Say. It was written by Pete Kirtley, Tim Hawes, and Betty Boo. The song was released on 12 March 2001 as the lead single from Hear'Say's debut album, Popstars (2001). The B-side is a cover of Simon & Garfunkel's "Bridge over Troubled Water".

"Pure and Simple" debuted at number one on the UK Singles Chart after selling 550,000 copies in its first week, which, at the time, made it the fastest-selling debut single of all time in the United Kingdom. It spent a total of three weeks at the top and has sold over 1.08 million copies in the UK. In 2012, it was the seventh biggest-selling debut single of the 21st century in that country. The song also topped the New Zealand Singles Chart for five weeks and reached number three in Ireland.

== Writing dispute ==
The song's writing credits list Pete Kirtley, Tim Hawes and Betty Boo (under her real name of Alison Clarkson). Nearly 14 years after the song was released, Linzi Martin of the girl group Girl Thing made the assertion that she was responsible for the majority of the song's composition, having written the verses after her boyfriend Pete Kirtley played her the chorus. Simon Cowell confirmed the song was originally intended for Girl Thing but dismissed them as "bitter" about the success of Hear'Say. Girl Thing told Official Charts that the song was meant to be their "last shot" at success, but their manager Chris Herbert (who also managed Hear'Say) had given the song to the newer band as their debut single. Girl Thing said they were "gutted" by the decision. The song going to Hear'Say effectively ended Girl Thing's career. In the 2014 series of The Big Reunion other members of the band including Michelle Barber recall the band being present and contributing to the song, but none received credit as co-writers.

== Critical reception ==
Many critics noted that the song had a distinct resemblance to Oasis's "All Around the World" and All Saints' "Never Ever". BBC Radio 1 DJ Chris Moyles even recorded a parody version of "Pure and Simple" that included the song lyrics from these two songs. Despite this, Noel Gallagher took no legal action due to his own self-confessed borrowings from other artists. The song and band were also criticised by several contemporary musical acts at the time, including Stereophonics, David Gray, and Blur.

== Commercial reception ==
"Pure and Simple" was released on 12 March 2001 in the United Kingdom and received a continental European release in April 2001. On 18 March 2001, "Pure and Simple" debuted at number one on the UK Singles Chart. It sold 160,000 copies during its first day on sale and 549,823 copies during its first week, becoming the fastest-selling debut single of all time in the UK, a record beaten a year later by Will Young, the winner of the first series of Pop Idol, with his debut single "Evergreen" / "Anything Is Possible". It was also the third-fastest-selling single in UK chart history at that point, behind "Do They Know It's Christmas?" by Band Aid and "Candle in the Wind 1997" by Elton John. The song spent a total of three weeks at the top of the UK chart.

"Pure and Simple" sold 1.07 million copies in 2001, making it that year's second best-selling single. It was beaten only by Shaggy's "It Wasn't Me", which sold 80,000 copies more. By the time Hear'Say split up in 2002, the song had been certified double platinum for sales of over 1.2 million copies, making it one of the few singles to achieve that feat during the 2000s. It is also one of only 167 singles ever to sell 1 million copies in the UK, and has sold over 1.09 million as of November 2016. "Pure and Simple" is the seventh biggest-selling debut single of the 21st century in the UK, the second biggest seller by a mixed-gender group and the UK's 96th best-selling song of all time. The song was also a number-one hit in New Zealand, where it topped the RIANZ Singles Chart for five consecutive weeks in July and August 2001, earning a gold certification for selling over 25,000 copies.

== Track listings ==
UK CD single

1. "Pure and Simple"
2. "Bridge over Troubled Water"

UK cassette single

A. "Pure and Simple"
B. "Bridge over Troubled Water"

European maxi-CD and Australasian CD single

1. "Pure and Simple" – 3:47
2. "Bridge over Troubled Water" – 4:44
3. "Can't Stop Thinkin' About It" – 3:23

UK DVD single

1. "Pure and Simple" (audio only)
2. "Bridge over Troubled Water" (video)
3. "Popstars Greatest Hits"

1. Popstars Auditions – The Good, the Bad & the Ugly
2. Darius – Hit Me Baby One More Time
3. The Final Five Hear the Good News
4. The Final Five Move In

== Credits and personnel ==
Credits are lifted from the Popstars album booklet.

Studios

- Recorded at Mayfair Studios and The Strongroom (London, England)
- Mastered at Transfermation (London, England)

Personnel

- Jiant – production
  - Tim Hawes – writing, additional programming
  - Pete Kirtley – writing, beats, programming
- Alison Clarkson – writing
- Hear'Say – all vocals
- Milton McDonald – guitar
- Ian Sedgewick – bass guitar
- Keith Beauvais – Rhodes, strings
- Tim "Spag" Speight – mixing, engineering
- Andy Ward – assistant engineering
- Ed Chadwick – assistant engineering
- Richard Dowling – mastering

== Charts ==
=== Weekly charts ===
Chart (2001)	Peak position
Australia (ARIA)	72
Belgium (Ultratip Bubbling Under Flanders)	3
Europe (Eurochart Hot 100)	6
Germany (GfK)	83
Ireland (IRMA)	3
New Zealand (Recorded Music NZ)	1
Scotland Singles (OCC)	1
Switzerland (Schweizer Hitparade)	29
UK Singles (OCC)	1
UK Airplay (Music Week)	2

=== Year-end charts ===
Chart (2001)	Position
Ireland (IRMA)	19
New Zealand (RIANZ)	44
UK Singles (OCC)	2

== Certifications ==
Region	Certification	Certified units/sales
New Zealand (RMNZ)	Gold	5,000^{*}
United Kingdom (BPI)	2× Platinum	1,090,000
^{*} Sales figures based on certification alone.

== Release history ==
Region	Date	Format(s)	Label(s)	Ref.
United Kingdom	12 March 2001	CD; cassette; DVD	Polydor	
Europe	April 2001	CD	Polydor	
Australia	7 May 2001	CD	Polydor	
United States	5 June 2001	Contemporary hit; rhythmic contemporary radio	Universal	

== Other versions ==
"Pure and Simple" was covered by America's Got Talent winner Bianca Ryan for her self-titled debut album in 2006.
