= Kanye West videography =

Videos and media by American rapper

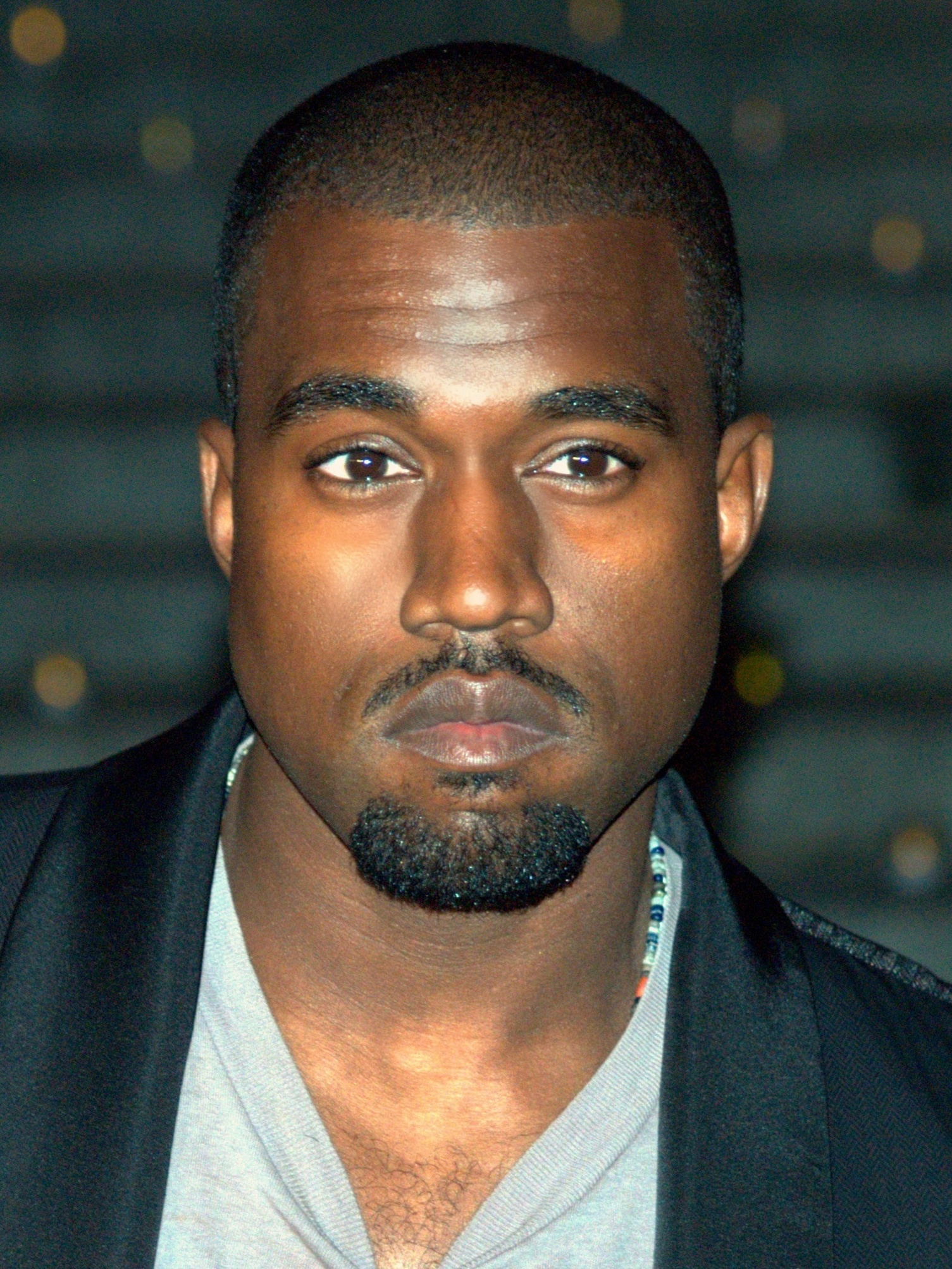
West attending the Vanity Fair kickoff party for the eighth annual Tribeca Film Festival in April 2009

American rapper Kanye West has released four video albums and been featured in various music videos. He has also made cameo appearances in films and appeared in several television programs.

== Music videos ==
=== As lead artist ===
Key
•	Denotes music videos directed by Kanye West

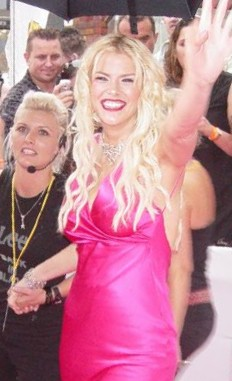
Anna Nicole Smith was one of many to appear in the music video for "The New Workout Plan."

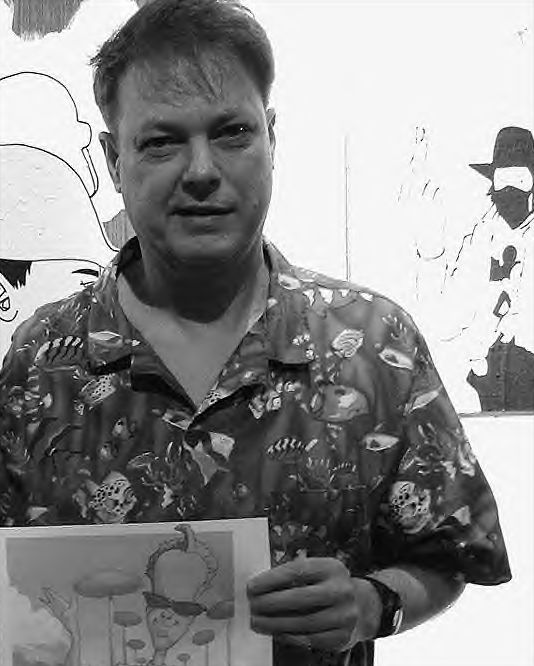
West collaborated with animator Bill Plympton for the second version of the music video for "Heard 'Em Say."

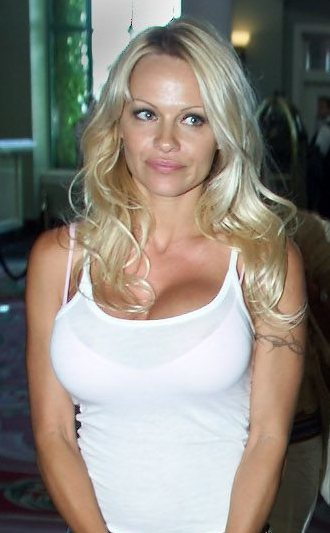
Pamela Anderson appears as West's love interest in the video for "Touch the Sky."

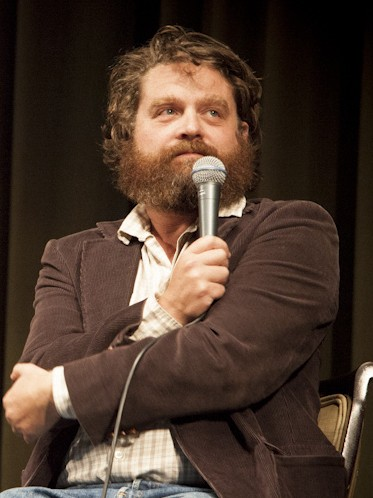
American comedian Zach Galifianakis is featured in the alternate music video for "Can't Tell Me Nothing."

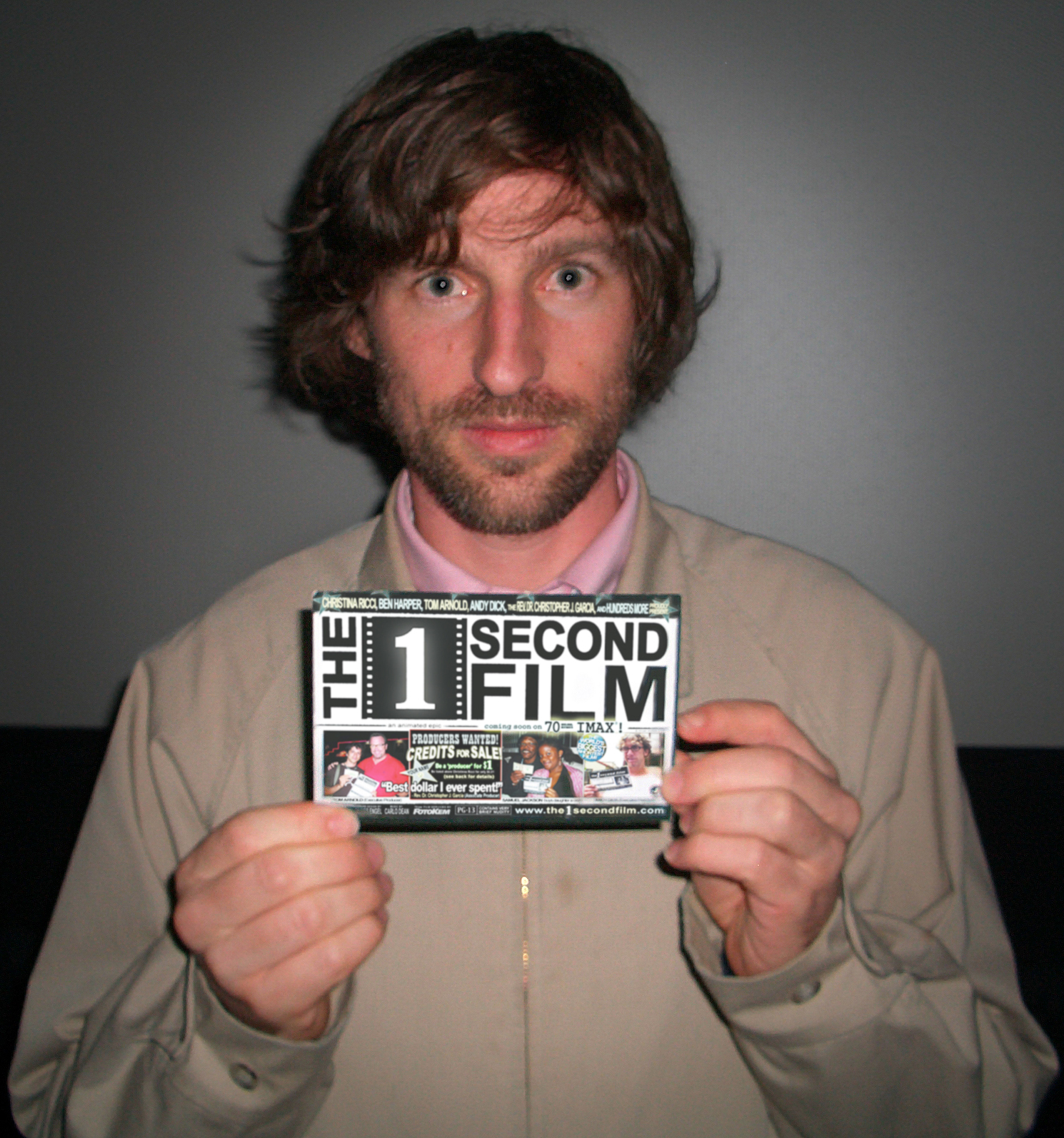
Spike Jonze has directed three music videos for West; the first version of "Flashing Lights," "Otis" and "Only One".

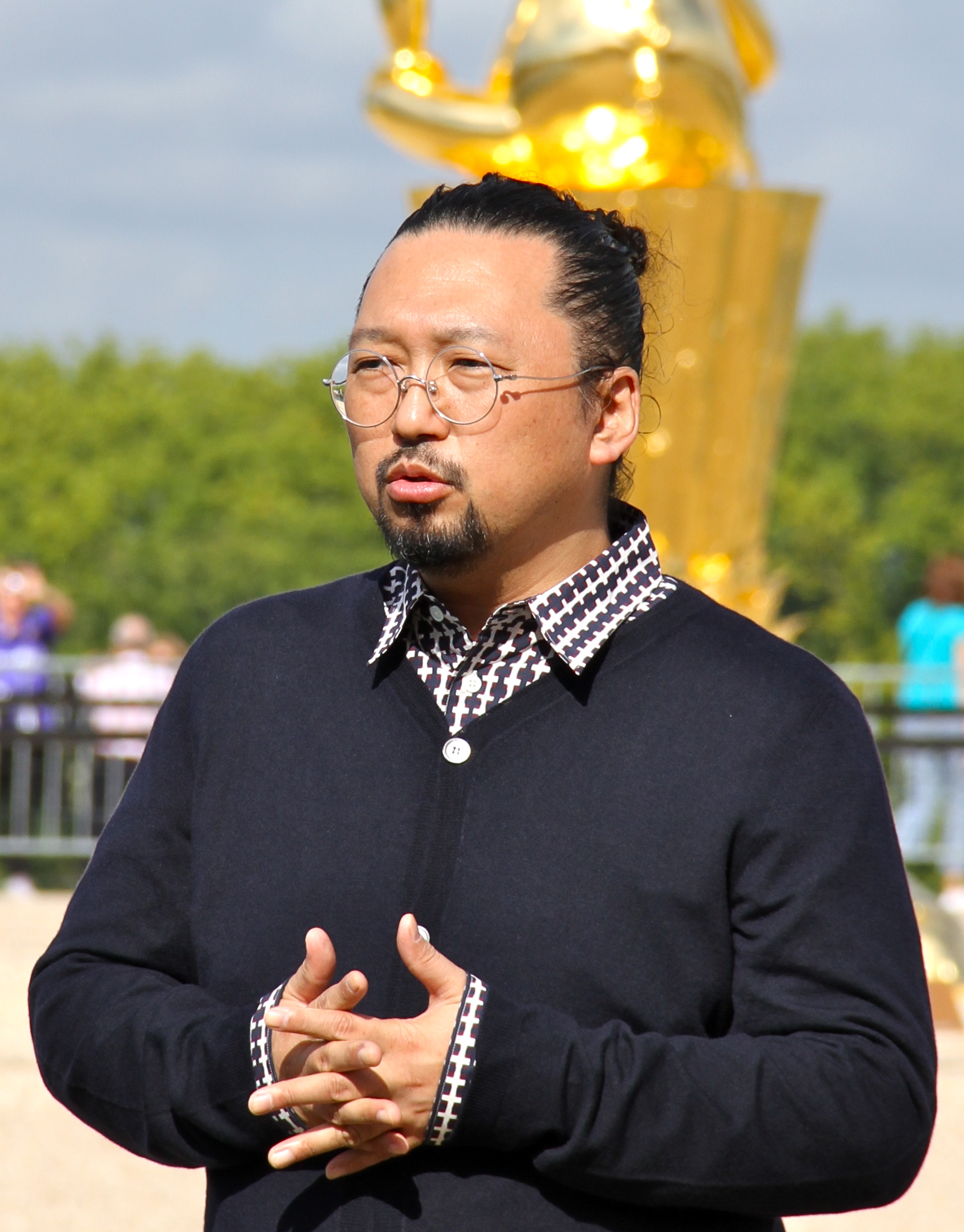
Japanese contemporary artist Takashi Murakami directed the animated music video for "Good Morning."

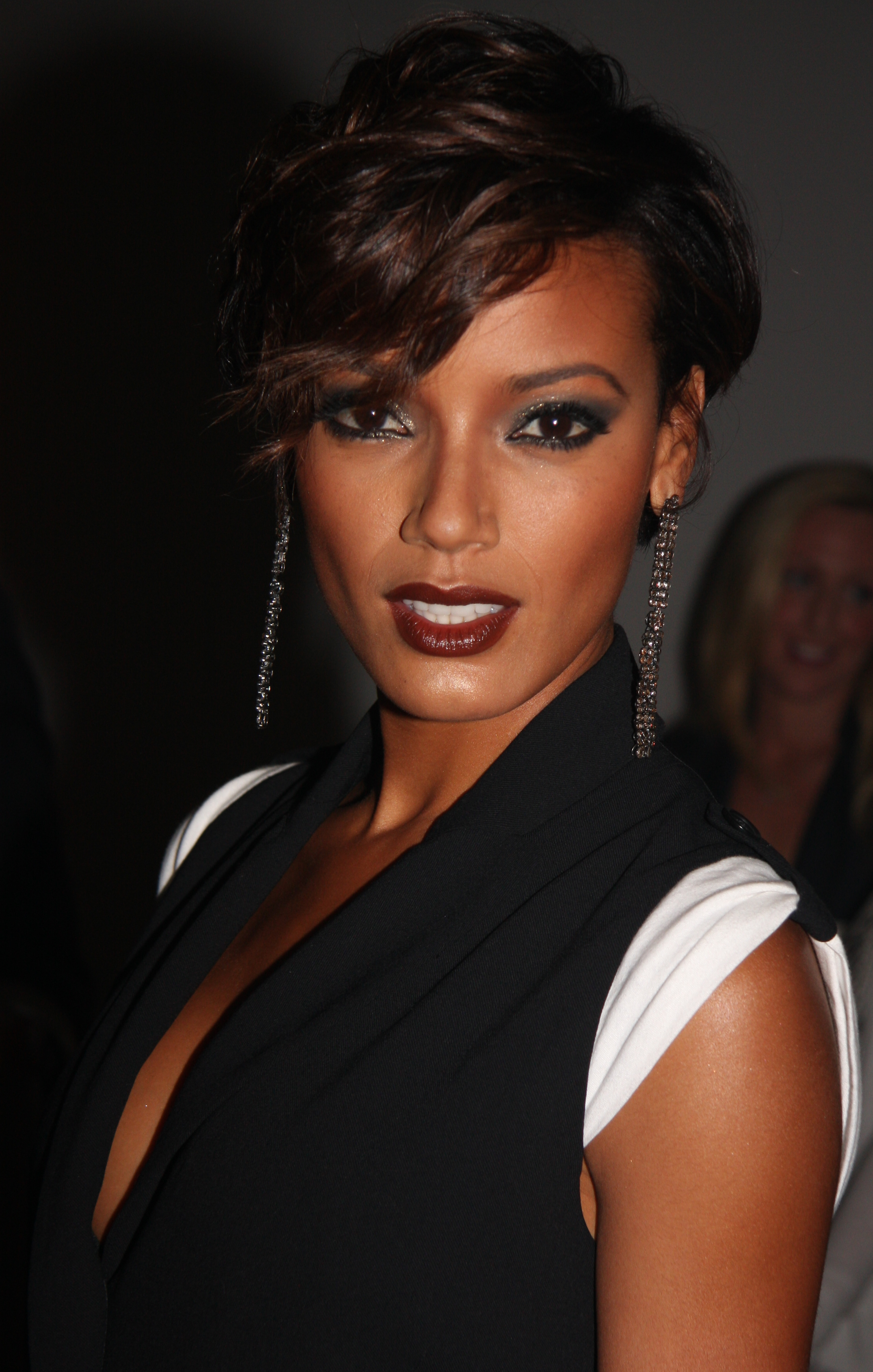
Cayman-born model and actress Selita Ebanks is featured in the video for "Runaway" as the phoenix.

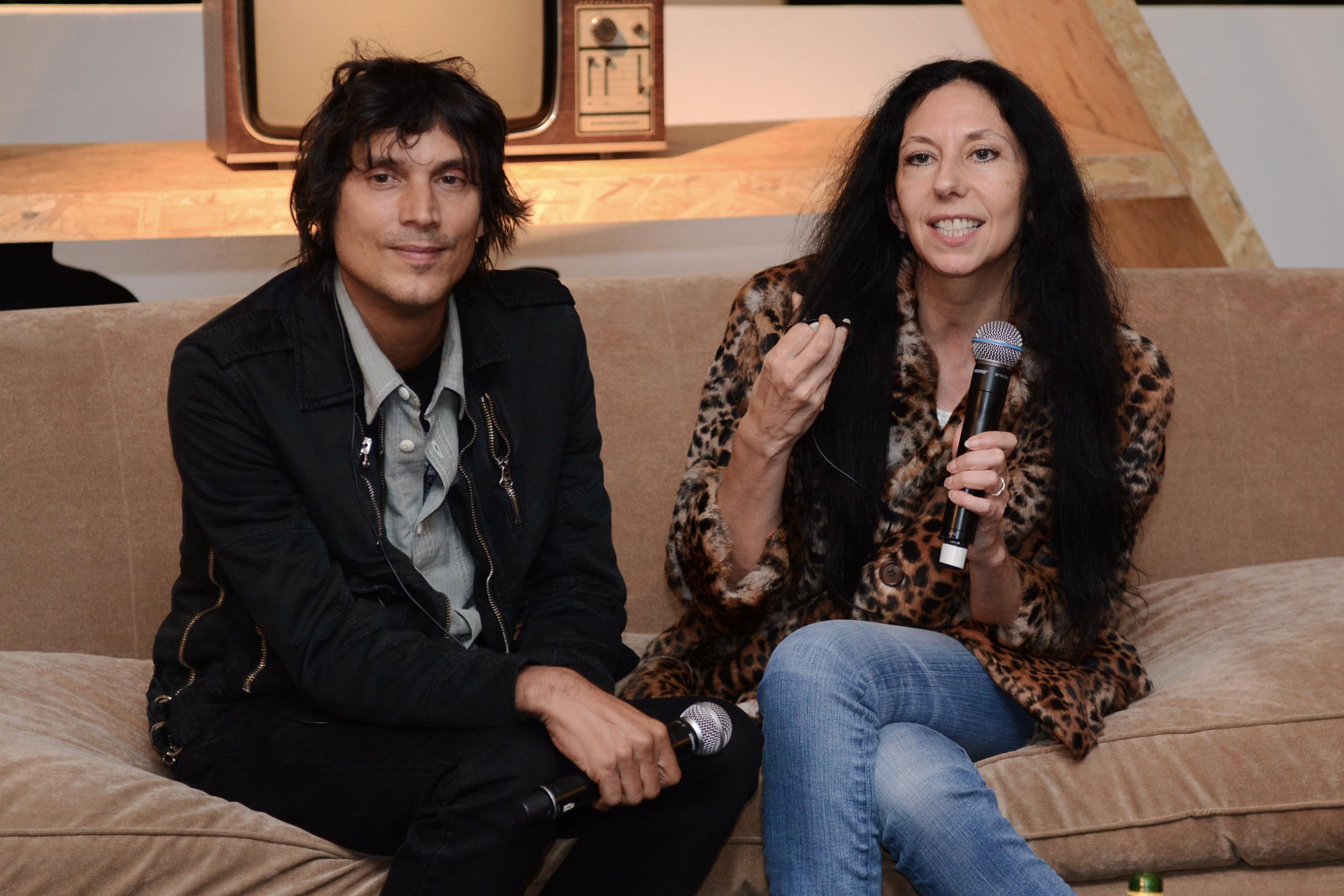
The Dutch fashion photographer duo Inez and Vinoodh directed the music video for "FourFiveSeconds."

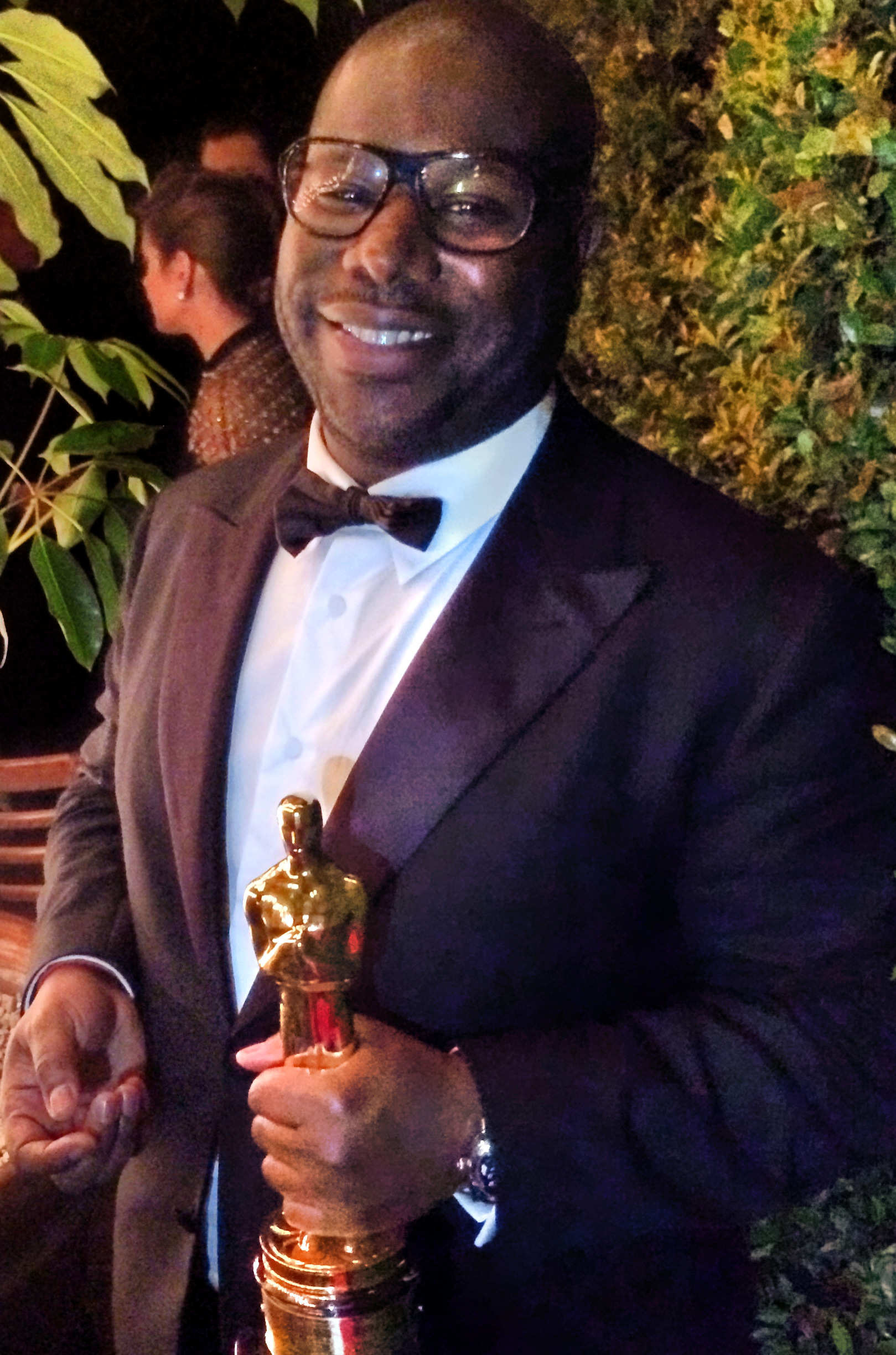
Steve McQueen directed the music video for "All Day."

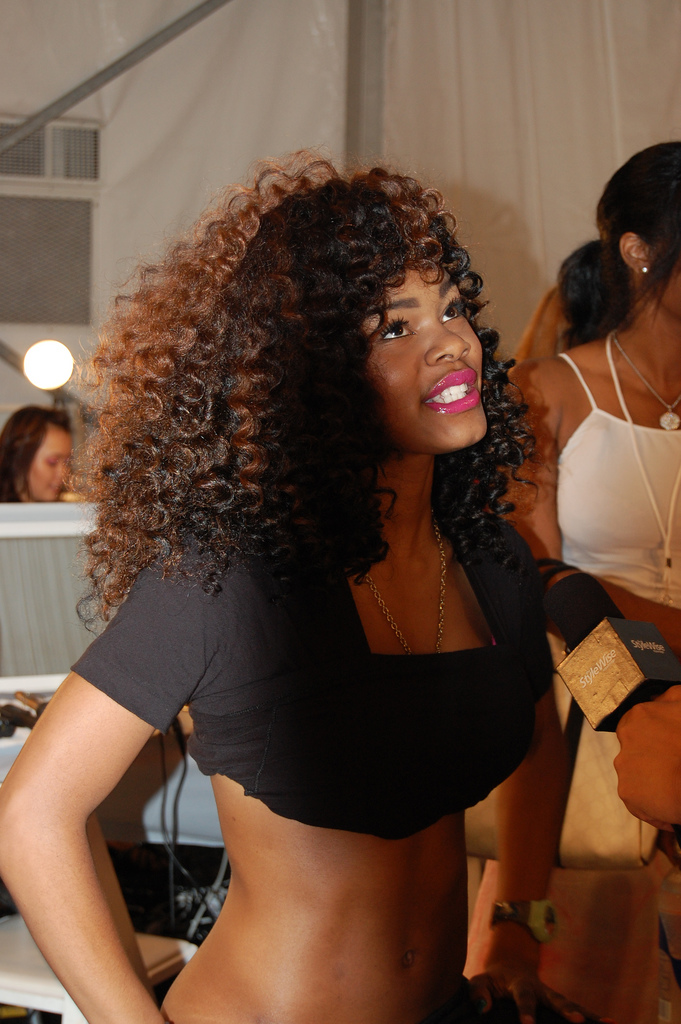
Singer and actress Teyana Taylor is prominently featured in the music video for "Fade."

List of music videos as lead artist
Title	Year	Other performer(s) credited	Director(s)	Description	Ref.
"Through the Wire" •	2003	None	Kanye West; Coodie and Chike	It is a slideshow of videos and pictures of West producing and his crash seen through the frames of Polaroid pictures. West, who financed the video, conceived ideas for the clip after seeing an Adidas advertisement in BlackBook magazine. He stated, "I don't like gettin' ideas from direct shit ... I like to pull ideas from all the way over here. Sometimes my vision can't be explained in words, 'cause I couldn't have even told you in words how I envisioned that video ending up."	
"Jesus Walks" (version 1)	2004	None	Michael Haussman	The music video was filmed in California and West is portrayed as a preacher rapping before a congregation from a pulpit. All the while, angels guide a prostitute, an alcoholic, and a drug dealer who want to change their lives to his Baptist church.	
"Jesus Walks" (version 2)	2004	None	Chris Milk	The video features West rapping in a hallway which is filled alternately with hellish flames and angelic light, in conjunction with footage of drug traffickers being pursued through a barren desert by police, prison camp inmates battling with guards, and a Ku Klux Klansman setting himself on fire while carrying a burning cross up a mountain.	
"Jesus Walks" (version 3) •	2004	None	Kanye West; Coodie and Chike	Shot in black-and-white, the low-budget video was filmed guerrilla-style in West's hometown of Chicago. It depicts Jesus in the present-day following West as he walks from his home and through his neighborhood to church, performing miracles along the way.	
"All Falls Down"	2004	Syleena Johnson	Chris Milk; Kanye West	Filmed at the Ontario International Airport and shot from a first-person perspective. West escorts his girlfriend, played by Stacey Dash, from inside their car and throughout the departure terminal to catch her flight. The video illustrates their journey literally through West's eyes, but he is momentarily seen rapping lines when passing by reflective mirrors. Certain scenes are in slow-motion and include cameos by Syleena Johnson, Common, and Kel Mitchell playing the various roles of airport employees.	
"The New Workout Plan" •	2004	None	Little X; Kanye West	The video is tailored in the manner of an infomercial for a series of workout tapes. It boasts cameos from Anna Nicole Smith, Tracee Ellis Ross, Esther Baxter, Vida Guerra, Consequence, GLC, Miri Ben-Ari, John Legend, and West's mascot Dropout Bear and features Fonzworth Bentley performing his guest verse from the remix. The long version of the video contains an extended introduction derived from a skit taken from The College Dropout.	
"Diamonds from Sierra Leone"	2005	None	Hype Williams	The music video was shot entirely in black-and-white and filmed on location in the city of Prague. West traverses throughout the Czech Republic capital as the video depicts young African children toiling away in mines juxtaposed with scenes of wealthy Europeans shopping in boutiques and trying on jewelry. The music video concludes with text which reads, "Please purchase conflict-free diamonds."	
"Gold Digger"	2005	Jamie Foxx	Hype Williams	A cute girl sticks out her tongue towards the end of this video	
"Heard 'Em Say" (version 1)	2005	Adam Levine	Michel Gondry	Filmed in Macy's flagship department store in New York City, the live-action music video expresses a surrealistic Christmas sentiment with the use of special effects. It depicts West as a homeless father of three young children who stay overnight inside the store which seems to come alive. Adam Levine plays a security guard while co-producer Jon Brion makes a brief cameo appearance.	
"Heard 'Em Say" (version 2) •	2005	Adam Levine	Bill Plympton; Joe DeMaio; Kanye West	The animated music video expresses grayscale pencil-sketch animation. It contains literal interpretations of select lyrics while West is portrayed as a taxicab driver working in a bleak city who picks up troubled passengers and encounters a young boy and his mother. The animated segments are interspersed with live-action scenes of West and Adam Levine performing.	
"Touch the Sky"	2006	Lupe Fiasco	Chris Milk	It was done in homage to Evel Knievel's unsuccessful jump across the Snake River Canyon in 1974 and West uses the music video to make fun of his huge ego. West also pokes fun at his anti-Bush outburst from 2005 and the possibility of his career arc ending with a crash-and-burn. The video features a cameo from actress and model Pamela Anderson, who opposes the daredevil character that West portrays. Actresses Nia Long and Tracee Ellis Ross also make appearances in it.	
"Drive Slow"	2006	Paul Wall; GLC; T.I.	Hype Williams	In the video, West is being driven around the neon lights of the Fremont Street Experience in downtown Las Vegas.	
"Classic (Better Than I've Ever Been)" (DJ Premier Remix)	2007	KRS-One; Nas; Rakim	Thibaut de Longeville		
"Can't Tell Me Nothing" (version 1)	2007	None	Hype Williams	Filmed in a desert, the music video harbors a minimalist visual aesthetic, with scenes of West performing in the barren, wide-open landscape.	
"Can't Tell Me Nothing" (version 2)	2007	None	Michael Blieden	The alternate version features comedian Zach Galifianakis and folk singer-songwriter Will Oldham and filmed at Galifianakis' farm in North Carolina. West is absent from the unscripted, low-budget music video, which instead sees Galifianakis and Oldham lip-synching to his lines.	
"Stronger"	2007	None	Hype Williams	It explores life in a sleek space-age robot world set in Japan, filmed in the country's capital Tokyo and Los Angeles (L.A.), featuring shots in Aoyama clothing store A Bathing Ape and Harajuku clothing store Billionaire Boys Club/Ice Cream. The music video also includes cameos from the two principal actors from the film Daft Punk's Electroma dressed as Daft Punk; West's manager Don C insisted on their appearances because "that's what it was". The video also features multiple scenes which pay homage to the 1988 anime film Akira, adding elements of sci-fi. These include the light effects on the motorbikes, the medical machinery examining West, and Daft Punk's control room.	
"Good Life"	2007	T-Pain	So Me; Jonas & François	The music video casts West and T-Pain against a white backdrop, heavily accompanied by digital effects. A colorful theme is harbored, showing cartoon sketches and spelling out the song's lyrics. Visuals also echo the lyrics, beginning with hands being thrown up and police vehicles appearing on duty. Additional visuals include West leaning on his Ferrari and performing "Good Life" with T-Pain through TV screens. The music video features a cameo from rapper and model LoLa Monroe. Towards the end of the video, the backdrop turns black as the performers are shown enjoying a rich lifestyle while joined by women.	
"Flashing Lights" (version 1) •	2008	Dwele	Kanye West; Spike Jonze	Filmed entirely in slow-motion, the video has a Ford Mustang Bullitt roll onto the screen and stop at dusk in the desert outside of Las Vegas, Nevada. Playboy model Rita G. exits the vehicle dressed in a wig, fur coat and large black sunglasses. After walking a distance away from the car, stripping down to her lingerie and setting her clothes on fire, she walks back to the car and opens the trunk to reveal a bound and gagged West. She gently strokes his face and gives him a light kiss before retrieving a nearby shovel and bludgeons him to death as the camera pans out.	
"Flashing Lights" (version 2)	2008	Dwele	—N/a		
"Flashing Lights" (version 3)	2008	Dwele	—N/a		
"Homecoming"	2008	Chris Martin	Hype Williams	Filmed in the city of Chicago, the black-and-white music video features a montage of West visiting several different areas of his hometown, with slow-motion shots and camera angles highlighting its buildings, streets, monuments and citizens. Chicago hip-hop group L.E.P. Bogus Boys and rapper Common make cameos.	
"Champion"	2008	None	NABIL	The video carries an Olympic theme and revolves around a puppet version of Kanye West participating in the 100-meter dash at a fictitious sporting event known as the Unified Games. Flashbacks display the extensive amount of training that the puppet undertook before the race commences.	
"Good Morning" •	2008	None	Kanye West; Takashi Murakami	An animated video centered around West's anthropomorphic teddy bear mascot Dropout Bear. He overcomes various obstacles while racing through a futuristic city in an effort to reach his college campus in time to attend his graduation ceremony.	
"Love Lockdown"	2008	None	Simon Henwood	The music video is mostly set in West's real life apartment, with him being dressed in white while appearing in the apartment. For paying homage to Christian Bale's role in American Psycho, the rooms were treated to remove all colour. West unhappily moves around the apartment, not looking into the camera until two minutes into the video. During the song's choruses, African dancers and drummers appear, beating on djembe drums to the Roland TR-808 drumbeats of song. Simultaneously, African tribe members are present, who run wildly and head into battle. Two women eventually increase their vividness, becoming some of the dominant characters. West later sits against the wall as the camera starts shaking.	
"Heartless"	2008	None	Hype Williams	Throughout the animated music video, West expressing grief about his break-up with Alexis Phifer is interspersed with scenes of various women. The women are rotoscoped over West at times, with them having been drawn on top of the footage by hand. West wanders around a city while backed by the night sky at first, before he sits in a car's back seat. At one point, a portrait of Andy Warhol's artwork Campbell's Soup Cans is displayed. The locations that West appears in during the video are highly stylized, including a Miami street scene and a space-age version of Times Square. He briefly breaks his character, smoking a cigarette. At the end, West demonstrates frustration in an apartment while portraits of animated sitcom The Jetsons can be seen in the background.	
"Welcome to Heartbreak"	2009	Kid Cudi	NABIL	The music video was filmed in Los Angeles and utilizes the visual technique of datamoshing. It contains multi-faceted textures of compression artifacts laced throughout its technicolor visuals. The bleeding pixels, calculated moshes and other manipulated imagery makes it seem as if the software that rendered the final video output a low-resolution, artifact-laden product. West and Kid Cudi appear at various intervals within the transitional music video, with certain shots in super-slow-motion.	
"Amazing"	2009	Young Jeezy	Hype Williams	The video was shot in Kauai, Hawaii, and includes a series of aerial shots of the Hawaiian Islands and sees West contemplating nature whilst feeling lonesome. Young Jeezy has a cameo in it, along with a girl wearing a bikini by the fire.	
"Paranoid"	2009	Mr Hudson	NABIL	It stars Rihanna. The music video's premise is rooted in fantasy, centering around Rihanna's paranoid state of mind causing her to experience a surrealistic dream sequence. Meanwhile, West appears in some scenes in his human form and also his wolf form during the dream sequence.	
"Spaceship" •	2009	GLC; Consequence	Kanye West	The videos, made for songs from The College Dropout, were shelved in 2005 in anticipation of his forthcoming sophomore album	
"Two Words"	2009	Mos Def; Freeway; Harlem Boys Choir	Coodie and Chike	The videos, made for songs from The College Dropout, were shelved in 2005 in anticipation of his forthcoming sophomore album	
"Street Lights"	2009	None	Javier Longobardo	The video is computer animated and features West driving a car through a deserted metropolis, searching for a destination that he never reaches.	
"Coldest Winter"	2010	None	NABIL	A purple color palette is used for the music video, which begins with shots of a bride dressed in white and Grim Reaper-style characters interspersed by ones of a dark, winter forest. Various shots in the video depict her running through the forest, being pursued by the characters. The same actions are shown in slow motion as the video progresses, with the woman also looking in varying directions at points. She later falls over but quickly stands back up and looks around herself, before running from the Grim Reapers again. The bride continues to run away until she leaps off a cliff, being absorbed by dark forces.	
"Power"	2010	None	Marco Brambilla	As the music begins, the camera slowly tracks out in one continuous take to reveal West standing at the end of a hallway of black columns, and surrounded by partially dressed female characters. Some kneel before him, some embrace, four figures wear ibex-like horns; and some are inverted, pouring water that flows upward. Two horned, staff-bearing figures, loosely resembling interpretations of Isis and Hathor, stand on either side of West; each slowly strikes the ground with their staff, in time to the music. The Sword of Damocles hangs over the rapper's head, while other slowly moving figures appear ready to strike West with blades. The various figures within the painting are presented in poses similar to the Major Arcana and Minor Arcana of the Etteilla occult tarot deck.	
"Runaway" •	2010	Pusha T	Kanye West	The video was made available in a short, extended, and feature film version	
"All of the Lights"	2011	Rihanna; Kid Cudi	Hype Williams	It features strobe-lit images of Rihanna and West, Kid Cudi in a red leather suit, and visual references to Gaspar Noé's 2009 film Enter the Void.	
"Monster"	2011	Jay-Z; Rick Ross; Nicki Minaj; Bon Iver	Jake Nava	The music video is inspired by horror films and extensively features gothic and horror related imagery, including references to Michael Jackson's Thriller. The video features references to horror cult films such as American Psycho and Saw as well as the supposedly haunted painting The Hands Resist Him. The Hand Resists Him is a painting created by artist Bill Stoneham in 1972, depicting a young boy and female doll standing in front of a glass paneled door against which many hands are pressed. The painting became famous for apparently being haunted. The painting is referenced during a scene in the video where Kanye West attempts to hold a door closed, from the monsters outside attempting to enter. The video features mostly naked corpse looking models, some of which are decapitated. West's role in the video is similar to Doctor Frankenstein, with the video set in a castle. Jay-Z appears in the video dressed in a tuxedo, standing in front of a nude corpse in a darkly-lit library. Zombies appear in the video, with hanging corpses and blood-splattered furniture. The video also contains the duality of Minaj; Harajuku Barbie (born January 7, 1995) and Roman Zolanski (born August 23, 1989). Roman reveals his real form; a naturally curly long black-haired demon in a black gothic outfit. He is a dominatrix in this video. Barbie reveals her real form; a naturally straight long banged neon pink-haired angel in a white bridal dress. However, she is a damsel in distress in this video. This is because Roman kidnapped Barbie. He tortures her while they both rap Minaj's dialogued verse. Blac Chyna is Minaj's double.	
"Otis"	2011	Jay-Z; Otis Redding	Spike Jonze	The video, features a cameo by Aziz Ansari. It primarily shows West and Jay-Z destroying and then customizing a Maybach 57 and then racing around an industrial lot in it (with no doors or windows), while four models smile and laugh from the backseat. The "dynamic duo take a saber saw to a glistening new Maybach and turn it into a tricked-out 'Thunderdome' cruiser, then do doughnuts in a parking lot with a gaggle of models packed in the back." The video "eschews the narrative spazzouts and stoner-boggling tricks of previous Jonze videos" preferring instead to "luxuriate in the icon status of its two principals. We get fireworks, fist bumps, a fast car, and general larger-than-life camaraderie rather than, say, guys on fire running in slow-motion. It's like The Expendables, if that movie only starred two guys, and both of them were rappers who didn't do any onscreen fighting." The car was put up for auction, and the proceeds were donated toward the East African Drought Disaster. The car sold for $60,000 at auction, despite its $350,000 retail price and $100,000–$150,000 evaluation before the auction.	
"Niggas in Paris" •	2012	Jay-Z	Kanye West	The music video is composed from live concert footage of Jay-Z and West performing at the Staples Center during the last Los Angeles venue on their Watch the Throne Tour. The footage are treated with kaleidoscopic effects as well as images of big cats and Paris landmarks. It also includes a brief video clip taken from the comedy film Blades of Glory. The music video was accompanied by a warning message to viewers with photosensitive epilepsy regarding its extensive use of flashing lights.	
"Lost in the World"	2012	Bon Iver	Ruth Hodben	The black-and-white clip opens with a warning that "strobe effects are used in this video" and features a group of models dressed in sheer fabric dancing while West poses during his verse. West's face is actually not shown anywhere in the video, which mostly showcases "tortured and slick mirrors and skylines, with a well-placed dancer depicting the heaven and hell in which the rapper wallows." According to Belinda White of The Daily Telegraph, it features designers Gareth Pugh and Rick Owens, stylists Katie Grand and Katie Shillingford and "brands such as Louis Vuitton, Barneys, Mac Cosmetics and Selfridges."	
"No Church in the Wild"	2012	Jay-Z; Frank Ocean; The-Dream	Romain Gavras	The music video was filmed in the areas surrounding Prague's Jan Palach Square and National Theatre, as well as near Škoda Palace in Jungmannova Street. There were two hundred extras, divided into police and rioters. The video is "influenced by the protests and civil unrest that took place all across the country". The video's final shot bears similarity to an image from visual artist UnkleLuc's project The Wild. Rolling Stone reported that the "clip for 'No Church in the Wild' depicts a grim clash between a large number of protesters and heavily armed and violent riot police".	
"Mercy"	2012	Big Sean; Pusha T; 2 Chainz	NABIL	The music video was filmed in a university at Qatar Foundation's parking garage in Doha, Qatar, while West was producing his short film, Cruel Summer. The video was shot in a wide aspect ratio, featuring the artists performing in what appears to be a parking garage as the camera pans smoothly across the space. A Lamborghini Gallardo LP560-4 is prominently displayed in the background, adding to the video's sleek aesthetic. Marc Hogan of Spin praised the video for its minimalistic black-and-white visuals, primarily featuring West and his collaborates exuding style and attitude. He highlighted the sequence coinciding with the song's synth lift as the visual peak, noting the moment when two versions of West appear simultaneously as a standout creative choice. Carrie Batton of Pitchfork described the video as a minimalist yet visually striking black-and-white production, notable for its use of leather outfits, keffiyehs, and sharply composed camera angles that enhance its stylish presentation.	
"I Wish You Would" / "Cold"	2012	DJ Khaled; Rick Ross	Hype Williams	Both music videos were filmed in the same location, Mack Maine, Ace Hood, and Birdman make cameo appearances in the music video for "I Wish You Would". The music video for "Cold" features an appearance by West's then-partner Kim Kardashian.	
"Black Skinhead"	2013	None	Nick Knight	Its interactive portion allows users to control the video's speed down to almost one-sixteenth the normal rate, as well as take screenshots for use on social media platforms. The user's cursor changes to that of a black hand giving the finger when interacting with the video. The video opens with three figures wearing black conical hoods, reminiscent of those worn by the Ku Klux Klan; the hoods form a black border that envelops most of the screen, while the silhouettes of the outlying cones stay on each end. The music video has a blurred black-and-white background within it. The primary action takes place in the middle portion of the screen occupied by a shirtless, computer-generated version of West, wearing a long chain and leather pants It raps the song's lyrics and dances. West appears in various forms: a rough, spiky animatic; a silhouetted model; one whose upper torso save the face is covered in talc; a heavily muscled version; and a nude version with rows of subdermal implants on the shoulders and chest. Interspersed with his figure are several brief flashes of snarling dobermanns and other predatory animals.	
"Bound 2"	2013	None	Nick Knight	The music video features West's then-fiancée Kim Kardashian riding topless with him atop a motorbike in front of the Monument Valley mountain range and other green-screen landscapes.	
"Only One"	2015	Paul McCartney	Spike Jonze	The video was shot in the minimalist style that West had been continuously using. It sees West walking through a soggy field with his daughter North, who was 18 months old at the time, and he is silhouetted by fog.	
"FourFiveSeconds"	2015	Rihanna; Paul McCartney	Inez and Vinoodh	The video features Rihanna, West, and McCartney performing against a white background. She explained the fashion that they used for the video, "Kanye came up with the idea of doing just some real street, denim, all-American-type look. Denim never goes out of style; it's classic, it's iconic, just like the Beatles."	
"All Day" / "I Feel Like That"	2015	Theophilus London; Allan Kingdom; Paul McCartney	Steve McQueen	The visual features West as the only star in it and is set in a warehouse room for the entirety that West runs around in. Once he stops running around, West heavily breathes after McCartney's outro on "All Day", leading into a song entitled "I Feel Like That" being played in the video. While the song begins to play, West collapses on the floor of the warehouse. The song sees West go deep into his issues with mental health, which he also references in the songs "U Mad" and "FML".	
"Famous" •	2016	None	Kanye West; Eli Linnetz	The video displays West sharing a bed with the nude, sleeping bodies of famous celebrities. Kim Kardashian, Taylor Swift, George W. Bush, Donald Trump, Anna Wintour, Rihanna, Chris Brown, Ray J, Amber Rose, Caitlyn Jenner, and Bill Cosby are all shown as wax figures.	
"Wolves"	2016	None	Steven Klein	The music video was released as part of a Balmain advert campaign. It resonates with the emotional feel of the song as it features West and his wife Kim Kardashian in tears. The video also features Alessandra Ambrosio, Francisco Lachowski, Joan Smalls, Jourdan Dunn, Josephine Skriver, Kylie Jenner, Sia, Jordan Barrett, and Vic Mensa. The video is black-and-white and sees West and his wife wearing the same outfits designed for their appearance at 2016's Met Gala.	
"Fade" •	2016	None	Kanye West; Eli Linnetz	The music video prominently features Teyana Taylor performing an extensive dance routine inside a gym. She is joined by her husband, Sacramento Kings guard Iman Shumpert, during a shower scene. West's inspirations for the video include Flashdance, the Ohio Players album covers, 1980s pornography, John Carpenter films, The Fly, Dancing with the Stars, the Olympics and the NBA championship.	
"I Love It" •	2018	Lil Pump	Amanda Adelson; Kanye West	The music video was premiered at the 2018 Pornhub Awards and features an appearance from Adele Givens. West and Lil Pump wear giant, rectangular body suits reminiscent of characters from the video game platform Roblox as they walk behind a giant Givens down a hallway lined with women covered in mesh cloth posing as statues, while Givens occasionally turns to give them stern looks. The women statues can be seen moving, breathing, and shifting throughout the video. The video was executive-produced by Spike Jonze.	
"Follow God"	2019	None	Jake Schreier	Filmed at Kanye West's ranch in Cody, Wyoming, is the first video that Kanye and his father, Ray West, have appeared in together. The music video opens with a scene of Kanye and Ray walking on snow. Pastor Kerwin B. Lee delivers a voiceover, asking: "What does it really mean to follow God?". He describes how Kanye and others feel fear when they first walk in the snow from the perspective of God looking at his children. The outfit worn by Kanye consists of an orange hoodie, white vest, brown gloves, and thermal trousers. The Wests drive around in all-terrain vehicles (ATVs) in the music video. After initially driving around in a relatively large ATV, the two of them later change to a larger one for transport and use the vehicle for doing donuts. The Wests are also shown dancing and Kanye mimes his own scream. The visual ends with white text displayed over a blue background. The message explains it took Kanye 42 years to realize that his father is his best friend.	
"Closed on Sunday"	2019	None	Jake Schreier	The music video was filmed at Kanye West's ranch in Cody, Wyoming, it is dimly lit and centered around family, beginning with Kanye and Kim Kardashian cuddling with their children; North, Saint, Chicago, and Psalm West, who are sleeping. Kardashian also has her eyes closed and Kanye West appears to be keeping watch, with the couple and their children being sat in the cleft of a rock formation, which is on a hill. The family members then walk hand-in-hand across a stone plateau, as the first verse of "Closed on Sunday" plays in the background. In the following scene, other members of the Kardashian-West family and members of the Sunday Service Choir both arrive in a convoy of all-terrain vehicles (ATVs). Kanye's then mother-in-law Kris Jenner steps out of an army tank wearing a fur coat, leather gloves and diamond earrings, joining a large group of the extended family that wears Carhartts, including Ray. The camera then zooms out to a shot of a group that shows Kanye's then sister-in-law Kourtney Kardashian and her children Mason Dash, Penelope Scotland and Reign Aston, front and centre, accompanied by the West children, their mother, and Jenner. Kanye West later stands alone on a rocky outcrop in the video before dropping to his knees, bowing his head, and raising his hand while the line "I pray to God that he'll strengthen my hand" is heard. West is surrounded by the Sunday Service Choir, with them doing this while he stands on the higher ground, and the group sing the last lyrics of the song. The music video concludes with a close-up shot of North West screaming "Chick-fil-A," differentiating from the original version of the song where the line is performed by her father.	
"Wash Us in the Blood"	2020	Travis Scott	Arthur Jafa	The video uses split-screen presentation throughout and features footage of West's Saint Pablo Tour, police brutality, a gospel choir, people with masks on that struggle to breathe, goats, Afrofuturism, Breonna Taylor dancing, Ahmaud Arbery soon before his shooting, protests, church services, cars doing donuts, scenes from Grand Theft Auto V, computer-generated images of West, imprisoned people, and an unmanned drone.	
"Come to Life" •	2021	None	Nico Ballesteros; Kanye West	The video features footage from the Donda's third public listening event at Soldier Field in Chicago on August 26, capturing West getting set on fire while sitting in a replica of his childhood home and wearing protective gear. The home is also set alight, accompanied by onlookers watching the scene. West then stands up and walks out, though remains covered in flames, before he is extinguished. The rapper's then-wife Kim Kardashian slowly approaches the center of the stadium as she wears a Balenciaga wedding dress, reuniting with him for the video's conclusion.	
"24"	2021	None	Nick Knight	The music video begins with a portion of "No Child Left Behind" playing in the background, and a clip of a fictional audience seemingly cheering for West during the second listening event at Mercedes-Benz Stadium for Donda; footage is shown from the event of him ascending to the sky while wearing his black Donda vest. West then floats into computer-generated clouds, with him hovering around the atmosphere. The rapper is accompanied by a backdrop of footage and images of his mother Donda West from the one minute mark onwards, including her laughing and smiling. Religious imagery and concert footage are also displayed, while Kanye West goes on to rise above the clouds and reach an infinite universe. He appears to be ascending to heaven to meet Donda at one point and towards the music video's end, the clouds vanish into a digital void.	
"Heaven and Hell"	2022	None	Arnaud Bresson		
"Hurricane"	2022	The Weeknd; Lil Baby	Arnaud Bresson	An army of digital masked avatars dressed in Yeezy Gap hoodies–resembling the music video released for "Heaven and Hell"–are present in the video, demonstrating a dystopian-looking society. The visual opens with the image of a half land and half water piece of coastline, accompanied by a grey dragon. This is followed by the army of digital avatars climbing fences of the ADX Florence prison building while lightning strikes, appearing merely as silhouettes initially until they can be seen wearing opaque masks. The avatars then escape prison to watch a faceless representation of Jesus get baptized, appearing on a beach where acid rain falls down. In the following scenes, people ascending towards the sky close to a beam of light, while swirling hurricane clouds can be seen. A flash of lightning pierces the sky, inviting the avatars to follow its light. The video also shows clips of West and his collaborators as CGI humanoids performing the song from a "strange heaven-like place". The video ends with a black and white photograph taken from Hurricane Katrina–which killed more than 1,800 people in 2005–of an American flag emerging from a pile of rubble.	
"Life of the Party"	2022	None	Arnaud Bresson	The video was released on mothers day and featured images from West's childhood. The music video served as both a commercial for Yeezy Gap and a tribute to Donda West. A press release from Gap Inc. stated "in a seamless alignment between Ye’s creative platforms new visuals bridge the multidisciplinary artist’s past and future. Photos from Ye’s childhood have been updated to inlay pieces from the forthcoming Yeezy Gap engineered by Balenciaga creative exploration".	
"Talking / Once Again" (version 1)	2024	Ty Dolla Sign; North West	Damiano and Fabio D'Innocenzo	The video shows shots of West and his daughter North, who is depicted getting her hair braided by a group of stylists. Ty Dolla Sign and his daughter, Jailynn Griffin, also appear.	
"Talking / Once Again" (version 2)	2024	Ty Dolla Sign; North West	North West; Aus Taylor	The visual focuses on North and her friends, hanging out while wearing Vultures-themed merch.	
"Vultures" (Havoc version)	2024	Ty Dolla Sign; Bump J; Lil Durk	Jon Rafman	The music video features visuals created using generative AI.	
"Vultures" • (Juice version)	2024	Ty Dolla Sign; Bump J; Lil Durk	Aus Onda; Kanye West		
"Carnival"	2024	Ty Dolla Sign; Rich the Kid; Playboi Carti	Jon Rafman	The music video serves as a tribute to Inter Milan's ultras, featuring CGI shots of them at a stadium during a football match. A shot of the song's artwork is shown around 20 seconds in and the "Vultures" logo appears several times, although West, Ty Dolla Sign, and the featured artists do not make any appearances in the video. Different male figures fight with each other in the stadium's celebrations, including skinheads and police troopers. Fires are started and some people who are attacked start bleeding, with the visuals inspired by football riots.	
"Fried" •	2024	Ty Dolla Sign	Austin Taylor; Kanye West	The music video is minimalist, and runs for two-and-a-half minutes. The video shows a large group of masked individuals wearing black hoodies and pants running through an eerie concrete setting, consisting of geometric structures and walls. They seem to run across hallways continuously, which infinitely stretch outwards. The music video led to mixed reactions from fans; some felt it worked well as a visualizer, while others were confused as to how it connected to the song.	
"Bomb"	2024	North West; Chicago West; Yuno Miles	—N/a		
"Slide" •	2024	Ty Dolla Sign	Aus Taylor; Kanye West	Filmed in black-and-white and shot with 4-Perf 35 mm film, the video was uses a singular, side-angle shot for its runtime. The video mostly features women, many of which are scantily clad. They are seen either hanging around the sidewalks or talking to men, who are implied to be their clients. Taylor described the video as "a portrait of the blade", a strip of road associated with prostitution. The setting appears run-down, as homeless people in tents and burning cars are visible throughout. A vulture can be seen in the video, referencing the title of the album.	
"Father"	2026	Travis Scott	Bianca Censori	A single-shot music video, it takes place in a minimalist church, with West, "dressed in a gray suit and stone-colored cowboy boots" sporting a straight face, and other attendees from elderly women to nuns appearing in the background. As the song begins, an attendant's card tricks evolve into flames before a police squad, next to a plate-armored knight on horseback, arrive to arrest a nun and carry her out of the church. Later on, two astronauts arrive to unmask West as an extraterrestrial alien before carrying him out of the church, right before Travis Scott appears in his wedding to two women. Throughout the music video's chaos, much of the attendees appear unbothered. Concluding the music video, most of the attendees leave the church, as a man enters with a large wooden crucifix and sits in West's spot. Thematically, it ranges from sci-fi elements involving aliens, UFOs, and astronauts, to religious imagery with a dancing choir group and crucifix, along with a knight on horseback. The music video also includes an uncredited individual sitting in the background who resembles the late Michael Jackson, who was later confirmed to be impersonator Fabio Jackson as he confirmed on Instagram.	

=== As featured artist ===
List of music videos as featured artist
Title	Year	Performer(s)	Director(s)	Album	Ref.
"Slow Jamz"	2003	Twista; Jamie Foxx	Fat Cats; Kanye West	Kamikaze / The College Dropout	
"This Way"	2004	Dilated Peoples	Dave Meyers	Neighborhood Watch	
"Talk About Our Love"	2004	Brandy	Dave Meyers	Afrodisiac	
"Higher"	2004	Do or Die	Morocco Vaughn	D.O.D.	
"Selfish"	2004	Slum Village; John Legend	Chris Robinson	Detroit Deli (A Taste of Detroit)	
"Wouldn't You Like to Ride?"	2005	Malik Yusef; Common	Coodie and Chike	Coach Carter (soundtrack)	
"Down and Out"	2005	Cam'ron; Syleena Johnson	Life Garland	Purple Haze	
"Number One"	2005	John Legend	Davy Duhamel	Get Lifted	
"Brand New"	2005	Rhymefest	Dave Meyers	Blue Collar	
"Extravaganza"	2006	Jamie Foxx	Paul Hunter	Unpredictable	
"Grammy Family"	2006	DJ Khaled; Consequence; John Legend	Bernard Gourley	Listennn... the Album / Don't Quit Your Day Job!	
"Number One"	2006	Pharrell	Hype Williams	In My Mind	
"Wouldn't Get Far"	2007	The Game	Bryan Barber	Doctor's Advocate	
"I Still Love H.E.R."	2007	Teriyaki Boyz	—N/a	Serious Japanese	
"Pro Nails"	2007	Kid Sister	Ruben Fleischer	Ultraviolet	
"American Boy"	2008	Estelle	Syndrome	Shine	
"Everybody"	2008	Fonzworth Bentley; André 3000	Dion Watkins	Non-album single	
"Everyone Nose (All the Girls Standing in the Line for the Bathroom)" (Remix)	2008	N.E.R.D.	Hype Williams	Non-album single	
"Put On"	2008	Young Jeezy	Gil Green	The Recession	
"Stay Up! (Viagra)"	2008	88-Keys	Jason Goldwatch	The Death of Adam	
"Go Hard"	2008	DJ Khaled; T-Pain	Hype Williams	We Global	
"Knock You Down"	2008	Keri Hilson; Ne-Yo	Chris Robinson	In a Perfect World...	
"Kinda Like a Big Deal"	2009	Clipse	Bernard Gourley	Til the Casket Drops	
"Ego" (Remix)	2009	Beyoncé	Frank Gatson Jr.; Beyoncé	Non-album single	
"Walkin' on the Moon"	2009	The-Dream	Hype Williams	Love vs. Money	
"Gifted"	2009	N.A.S.A.; Santigold; Lykke Li	Three Legged Legs	The Spirit of Apollo	
"Supernova"	2009	Mr Hudson	Jonas & François	Straight No Chaser	
"Make Her Say"	2009	Kid Cudi; Common	Nez Khammal	Man on the Moon: The End of Day	
"Digital Girl" (Remix)	2009	Jamie Foxx; The-Dream; Drake	Hype Williams	Intuition	
"Run This Town"	2009	Jay-Z; Rihanna	Anthony Mandler	The Blueprint 3	
"The Big Screen"	2009	GLC	Shalin	Love, Life & Loyalty	
"Forever"	2009	Drake; Lil Wayne; Eminem	Hype Williams	More than a Game (soundtrack)/ Relapse: The Refill	
"Whatever You Want"	2009	Consequence; John Legend	Hype Williams	Non-album single	
"Erase Me"	2010	Kid Cudi	Jason Goldwatch	Man on the Moon II: The Legend of Mr. Rager	
"Anyone but Him"	2010	Mr Hudson	Team Supreme	Straight No Chaser	
"Ayyy Girl"	2010	JYJ; Malik Yusef	Kim Jae-joong	The Beginning	
"E.T."	2011	Katy Perry	Floria Sigismondi	Teenage Dream	
"Marvin & Chardonnay"	2011	Big Sean; Roscoe Dash	Hype Williams	Finally Famous	
"Pride N Joy"	2012	Fat Joe; Miguel; Jadakiss; Mos Def; DJ Khaled; Roscoe Dash; Busta Rhymes	Hype Williams	Non-album single	
"Birthday Song"	2012	2 Chainz	Andreas Nilsson	Based on a T.R.U. Story	
"I Wish You Would"	2012	DJ Khaled; Rick Ross	Hype Williams	Kiss the Ring	
"Thank You"	2013	Busta Rhymes; Lil Wayne; Q-Tip	Director X	Non-album single	
"I Won"	2014	Future	Hype Williams	Honest	
"U Mad"	2015	Vic Mensa	Grant Singer	Non-album single	
"Blessings"	2015	Big Sean; Drake	Darren Craig	Dark Sky Paradise	
"One Man Can Change the World"	2015	Big Sean; John Legend	Andy Hines	Dark Sky Paradise	
"All Your Fault"	2015	Big Sean	Mark Mayer; Aaron Platt	Dark Sky Paradise	
"Piss on Your Grave"	2015	Travis Scott	NABIL	Rodeo	
"Figure It Out"	2016	French Montana; Nas	Eif Rivera	Wave Gods / MC4	
"Ballin"	2016	Juicy J	Andy Hines	Non-album single	
"That Part"	2016	Schoolboy Q	Colin Tilley	Blank Face LP	
"Mixed Personalities"	2019	YNW Melly	Cole Bennett	We All Shine	
"Eazy"	2022	The Game	Jordan M. Parson	Drillmatic – Mind Vs. Heart / Donda 2	
"City of Gods"	2022	Fivio Foreign; Alicia Keys	Aus Taylor	B.I.B.L.E. / Donda 2	
"Keep It Burnin"	2022	Future	Rick Nyce	I Never Liked You	
"Hot Shit"	2022	Cardi B; Lil Durk	Lado Kvataniya	Non-album single	

=== Cameo appearances ===
Title	Performer(s)	Director(s)	Album	Ref.
"Izzo (H.O.V.A.)"	Jay-Z	Dave Meyers	The Blueprint	
"Girls, Girls, Girls"	Jay-Z	Marc Klasfeld	The Blueprint	
"B R Right"	Trina	Darren Grant	Diamond Princess	
"Get By"	Talib Kweli	Jeremy Rall	Quality	
"Stand Up"	Ludacris	Dave Meyers	Chicken-n-Beer	
"Real Things"	Javine	Charles Infante	Surrender	
"Used to Love U"	John Legend	Ben Mor	Get Lifted	
"I Changed My Mind"	Keyshia Cole	Nzingha Stewart	The Way It Is	
"Same Direction"	Hoobastank	Brett Simon	The Reason	
"Get No Better"	Cassidy		Split Personality	
"Triple Trouble"	Beastie Boys	Nathaniel Hörnblowér	To the 5 Boroughs	
"Draped Up"	Bun B		Trill	
"Poppin' My Collar"	Three 6 Mafia		Most Known Unknown	
"God's Gonna Cut You Down"	Johnny Cash	Tony Kaye	American V: A Hundred Highways	
"Phantom Pt. II"	Justice	Daniel Bloomberg	†	
"I Want You"	Common	Kerry Washington; Sanji	Finding Forever	
"The Game"	Common		Finding Forever	
"Love in This Club"	Usher; Young Jeezy	Brothers Strause	Here I Stand	
"Everyone Nose (All the Girls Standing in the Line for the Bathroom)"	N.E.R.D	Diane Martel	Seeing Sounds	
"It's a New Day"	will.i.am	Ben Mor	Change Is Now: Renewing America's Promise	
"Ego"	Beyoncé	Frank Gatson Jr.	I Am... Sasha Fierce	
"Getcha Some"	Big Sean	Hype Williams	Finally Famous Vol. 2: UKNOWBIGSEAN	
"Make Love"	Keri Hilson	Matt Barnes	In a Perfect World...	
"Barbra Streisand"	Duck Sauce	So Me	Quack	
"Come on a Cone"	Nicki Minaj	Grizzlee Music	Pink Friday: Roman Reloaded	
"Mr. Rager"	Kid Cudi	Jérémie Rozan	Man on the Moon II: The Legend of Mr. Rager	
"Cheers (Drink to That)"	Rihanna	Evan Rogers	Loud	
"Wild Boy (Remix)"	Machine Gun Kelly	Unknown	Wild Boy	
"Oliver Twist"	D'banj	Sesan Ogunro	D'Kings Men	
"Numbers on the Boards"	Pusha T	So Me	My Name Is My Name	
"Bitch I'm Madonna"	Madonna	Jonas Åkerlund	Rebel Heart	
"Panda"	Desiigner	Paul Geusebroek	New English	
"Friends"	Francis and the Lights	Jake Schreier	Farewell, Starlite!	
"Diet Coke"	Pusha T	Omar Jones	It's Almost Dry	

== Video albums ==
Title	Album details	Description
The College Dropout Video Anthology	Released: March 22, 2005; Label: Roc-A-Fella, Def Jam; Formats: DVD	Contains the music videos for songs from his debut studio album, The College Dropout (2004).
Late Orchestration	Released: April 24, 2006; Label: Roc-A-Fella, Def Jam; Formats: DVD	Features his concert at Abbey Road Studios in London, England.
Late Registration Video Anthology	Released: December 19, 2006; Label: Roc-A-Fella, Def Jam; Formats: DVD	Contains the music videos for the singles from his second studio album, Late Registration (2004).
VH1 Storytellers	Released: January 5, 2010; Label: Roc-A-Fella, Def Jam; Formats: DVD	Contains the concert television special of West's live performances on VH1 Storytellers, originally aired on VH1 on February 28, 2009.

== Filmography ==
Title	Year	Role	Notes	Ref.
Fade to Black	2004	Himself	Uncredited cameo	
Dave Chappelle's Block Party	2005	Himself	Guest performance	
State Property 2	2005	Himself	Cameo appearance	
The Love Guru	2008	Himself	Cameo appearance	
We Were Once a Fairytale	2009	Himself	Short film; directed by Spike Jonze	
Runaway	2010	Griffin	Short film, also director and writer	
The Black Mamba	2011	Himself	Short film; directed by Robert Rodriguez	
Cruel Summer	2012	Ibrahim	Short film; co-directed with Alexandre Moors	
Bad 25	2012	Himself	Documentary film	
Anchorman 2: The Legend Continues	2013	Wesley Jackson of MTV News	Uncredited cameo	
Jesus Is King	2019	Himself	Short film; directed by Nick Knight	
A Man Named Scott	2021	Himself	Documentary film	
Bianca	2025	—N/a	Feature film; producer	
Bully V1	2025	—N/a	Short film; directed by Hype Williams	
In Whose Name?	2025	Himself	Documentary film; directed by Nico Ballesteros	

== Television ==
Title	Year	Role	Network	Notes	Ref.
Top Buzzer	2004	Customer	MTV	Episode: "The Long Weekend"	
MTV Diary	2004	Himself	MTV		
Punk'd	2004	Himself	MTV	Season 3, Episode 8	
Saturday Night Live	2005, 2007–2008, 2010, 2013, 2015–2016, 2018	Musical guest	NBC	8 episodes	
Entourage	Himself	HBO	Season 4, Episode 11		
The Cleveland Show	2010–2012	Kenny West (voice)	Fox	5 episodes	
Keeping Up with the Kardashians	2012–2021	Himself	E!		
David Blaine: Real or Magic	2013	Himself	ABC		
Loiter Squad	2014	Himself	Adult Swim (Cartoon Network)	Episode: "Sweet Chin Music"	
I Am Cait	2015	Himself	E!	Episode: "Meeting Cait"	
American Idol	2015	Auditioner	Fox	Season 15	
My Next Guest Needs No Introduction with David Letterman	2019	Himself	Netflix	Season 2, Episode 1	
The Kardashians	2022	Himself	Hulu	Season 1, Episode 1	

== Commercials ==
Company and product	Year	Director(s)	Featured song(s)	Description	Ref.
Boost Mobile	2004	Chris Robinson	"Where You At? (The Whole City Behind Us)"	The video showcases West, Ludacris and The Game using nationwide Boost Walkie-Talkie to exchange rhymes that pay tribute to their respective hometowns on location. West is shown rapping in front of a mixing console inside the control room of a recording studio in Chicago.	
Pepsi	2005	Spike Lee	"Heard 'Em Say"	The commercial premiered during the 2005 MTV Video Music Awards. Entitled "Timeline," it uses special effects and computer graphics to illustrate West walking past iconic backdrops of various major cities, including Paris, Tokyo and Chicago, while leaving a trailing aura fueled by Pepsi.	
Absolut Vodka	2008	Ulf Johansson	"Truth or Dare"		
