= Mind, Body & Song =

Studio album by Jade
- Released: September 27, 1994
- Recorded: 1993–1994
- Studios: Larrabee Studios North (North Hollywood, CA); Cherokee Studios (Hollywood, CA); DMH Studios (Elmsford, NY); Rondor Studios (Los Angeles, CA); Encore Studios (Los Angeles, CA); Soul Convention Studios (New York); The Plant Studios (Sausalito, CA); Sandcastle Studios (Los Angeles, CA); Digital Shack (Sherman Oaks, CA); Devonshire Studios (North Hollywood, CA)
- Genres: R&B; pop; new jack swing
- Length: 59:52
- Label: Giant
- Producers: Captain Curt; Cassandra Mills; Cory Rooney; Dave "Jam" Hall; DJ Pooh; Donald Parks; Emanuel Dean; Emanuel Officer; Jade; John Howcott; Paisley; Prince Markie Dee; Rashad Coes; Reginald Heard; Robert Jerald

Jade chronology
BET's Listening Party (1993)	Mind, Body & Song (1994)

Singles from Mind, Body & Song
- 1. "5-4-3-2 (Yo! Time Is Up)" Released: August 13, 1994; 2. "Every Day of the Week" Released: November 15, 1994

Professional ratings
Review scores
Source	Rating
AllMusic	3/5 stars
Billboard	(favorable)
Cash Box	(favorable)
Entertainment Weekly	A−

Mind, Body & Song is the second studio album by the American R&B trio Jade. It was released on September 27, 1994, via Giant Records.

Recording sessions took place at Larrabee Studios North and Devonshire Studios in North Hollywood, at Cherokee Studios, Rondor Studios, Encore Studios and Sandcastle Studios in Los Angeles, at DMH Studios in Elmsford, at Soul Convention Studios in New York, at The Plant Studios in Sausalito, and at Digital Shack in Sherman Oaks.

Production was handled by Cory Rooney, Dave "Jam" Hall, DJ Pooh, Prince Markie Dee, Rashad Coes, Donald Parks, Emanuel Officer, John Howcott, Captain Curt, Cassandra Mills, Emanuel Dean, Paisley, Reginald Heard, Robert Jerald and Jade themselves.

The album debuted at number 80 on the Billboard 200 and number 16 on the Top R&B/Hip-Hop Albums charts in the United States and peaked at number 13 on the Official Hip Hop and R&B Albums Chart in the UK.

Its lead single "5-4-3-2 (Yo! Time Is Up)" made it to number 72 on the Billboard Hot 100. The second single off of the album, "Every Day of the Week", reached number 20 on the Billboard Hot 100, number 19 on the UK singles chart and number 79 in Germany.

== Track listing ==
No.	Title	Writer(s)	Producer(s)	Length
1.	"When Will I See You Again (Intro)"	Di Reed; Joi Marshall; Tonya Kelly	Jade	0:30
2.	"If the Mood Is Right"	Gordon Chambers; David Hall	Dave "Jam" Hall	5:49
3.	"Bedroom"	Tabitha Duncan; Wendell Wellman; Donald Parks; Emanuel Officer; John Howcott	Donald Parks; Emanuel Officer; John Howcott	5:04
4.	"If the Lovin' Ain't Good"	Hall; Donell Jones	Dave "Jam" Hall; Darnell Jones (co.)	5:12
5.	"5-4-3-2 (Yo! Time Is Up)"	Reed; Marshall; Kelly; Mark C. Rooney; Mark Morales	Cory Rooney; Prince Markie Dee	5:16
6.	"What's Goin' On"	Reed; Marshall; Kelly; Herbert Curtis; Terrance Davis	Captain Curt	4:45
7.	"Hangin'"	Reed; Marshall; Kelly; Reginald Heard	Reginald Heard	3:59
8.	"Every Day of the Week"	Antonina Armato; Ken Miller; Robert Jerald	Robert Jerald; Cassandra Mills	5:15
9.	"Everything"	Laurneá Wilkerson; Emanuel Dean	Emanuel Dean	4:18
10.	"Do You Want Me"	Louis Hinton	Louis "Paisley" Hinton	4:59
11.	"I Like the Way"	Reed; Marshall; Kelly; Rooney; Morales	Cory Rooney; Prince Markie Dee	5:07
12.	"There's Not a Man"	Mark Jordan; Rashad Coes; Parks; Officer; Howcott	DJ Pooh; Rashad Coes; Donald Parks (co.); Emanuel Officer (co.); John Howcott (co.)	4:10
13.	"It's On"	Reed; Marshall; Kelly; Jordan; Coes; Parks; Officer; Howcott	DJ Pooh; Rashad Coes; Donald Parks (co.); Emanuel Officer (co.); Jade (co.); John Howcott (co.)	4:08
14.	"Mind, Body & Song"	Reed; Marshall; Kelly	Jade	1:20
Total length:				59:52

== Personnel ==
- Di Reed – vocals, producer (tracks: 1, 14), co-producer (track 13), A&R
- Joi Marshall – vocals, producer (tracks: 1, 14), co-producer (track 13), A&R
- Tonya Kelly – vocals, producer (tracks: 1, 14), co-producer (track 13), A&R
- Emanuel Officer – backing vocals & producer (track 3), co-producer (tracks: 12, 13), mixing and engineering assistant (track 1), arranger (track 14)
- Joseph McClendon – voice (track 6)
- Leslie Paton – voice (track 6)
- Mary Mary – voice (track 6)
- Richie V. – voice (track 6), mixing (track 10)
- Rob Chiarelli – voice (track 6), bass and drums (track 11), engineering (tracks: 6, 7, 10)
- Shavon Smith – voice (track 6)
- Shivell Wilder – voice (track 6)
- Dave "Jam" Hall – producer & engineering (tracks: 2, 4)
- Donald Parks – producer (track 3), co-producer (tracks: 12, 13)
- John Howcott – producer (track 3), co-producer (tracks: 12, 13)
- Mark Cory Rooney – producer & keyboards programming (tracks: 5, 11)
- Mark "Prince Markie Dee" Morales – producer & drum programming (tracks: 5, 11)
- Herbert "Captain Curt" Curtis – producer (track 6), mixing (tracks: 6, 7, 10, 11)
- Reginald Heard – producer & mixing (track 7)
- Cassandra Mills – producer (track 8), executive producer, A&R
- Robert Jerald – producer (track 8)
- Emanuel Dean – producer (track 9)
- Louis "Paisley" Hinton – producer & mixing (track 10), keyboards programming (track 6)
- Mark "DJ Pooh" Jordan – producer & mixing (tracks: 12, 13)
- Rashad Coes – producer (tracks: 12, 13)
- Donell Jones – co-producer (track 4)
- Stan "The Guitar Man" Jones – guitar (track 11)
- Steve Churchyard – engineering & mixing (tracks: 1, 14)
- David Dachinger – mixing (track 2)
- Booker T. Jones III – engineering (track 2)
- Milton Chan – engineering & mixing (track 3)
- Nick Brophy – engineering (track 3)
- Carlos Warlick – mixing assistant (track 3)
- Tina Antoine – mixing assistant (track 3)
- Matthew Ellard – engineering assistant (track 3)
- Lisa Huang – engineering assistant (track 3)
- Tony Maserati – mixing (track 4)
- Mike Fronda – engineering (tracks: 5, 11), mixing (track 5)
- Jose Sanchez – engineering assistant (tracks: 5, 11)
- Terrance Davis – keyboards programming (track 6)
- Antonina Armato – vocal arrangement (track 8)
- Jon Gass – engineering (track 8)
- Fred Kelly – engineering assistant (track 8)
- Laurneá Wilkerson – vocal arrangement (track 9)
- Craig Porteils – engineering & mixing (track 9)
- David Betancourt – engineering (track 10)
- Gabriel Sutter – engineering (track 10)
- Aaron Broussard – engineering assistant (track 10)
- Carlos Chiesa – engineering assistant (track 10)
- Josh Achziger – engineering (tracks: 12, 13)
- Warren Woods – engineering (tracks: 12, 13)
- Wendell Wellman – arrangement (track 14)
- Steve Hall – mastering
- Greg Ross – art direction, design
- Lorna Stovall – logo design
- Cathrine Wessel – photography
- Denise Samuelson – production coordinator
- Karen Lichtman – production coordinator

== Charts ==
Chart (1994)	Peak position
UK R&B Albums (Official Charts)	13
US Billboard 200	80
US Top R&B/Hip-Hop Albums (Billboard)	16
