= Best of My Love (Javine song) =

Single by Javine

from the album Surrender
- Released: 14 June 2004
- Recorded: 2003
- Genre: R&B
- Length: 3:24
- Label: Innocent; Virgin
- Songwriters: Lindy Robbins; Simon Ellis
- Producer: Johnny Douglas

Javine singles chronology
"Surrender (Your Love)" (2003)	"Best of My Love" (2004)	"Don't Walk Away" / "You've Got a Friend" (2004)

"Best of My Love" is a song by English singer and songwriter Javine. The single was released on 14 June 2004 and was the third single from her album Surrender (2004). The single reached number 18 on the UK Singles Chart, her third consecutive top-20 song.

== Commercial performance ==
Following her recent success with her previous singles ("Real Things" and "Surrender (Your Love)"), which both charted in the top 20 in the UK (the former in the top 5), the song maintained Javine's success on the charts, peaking inside the top 20 at number 18, as well charting in Ireland (which Javine's previous singles had also managed to do).

== Formats and track listings ==
CD 1

1. "Best of My Love"
2. "Real Things" (Urban North Remix)

CD 2

1. "Best of My Love"
2. "Best of My Love" (Johnny Douglas 7" Club Mix)
3. "Best of My Love" (Urban North Master Mix)
4. "Surrender (Your Love)" (original version)

== Charts ==
Chart performance for "Best of My Love"
Chart (2004)	Peak position
Ireland (IRMA)	49
UK Singles (OCC)	18
