= Jade to the Max =

Studio album by Jade
- Released: November 17, 1992
- Recorded: 1991–1992
- Studios: Oasis Recording Studios (Canoga Park, California); The Post Complex (Los Angeles, California)
- Genres: R&B; pop; new jack swing; hip hop soul
- Length: 52:04
- Labels: Giant; Reprise
- Producers: Vassal Benford; Ron Spearman; Alton "Wokie" Stewart

Jade chronology
Jade to the Max (1992)	BET's Listening Party (1993)

Singles from Jade to the Max
- 1. "I Wanna Love You" Released: September 1, 1992; 2. "Don't Walk Away" Released: November 23, 1992; 3. "One Woman" Released: 1993; 4. "Looking for Mr. Do Right" Released: 1993

Professional ratings
Review scores
Source	Rating
AllMusic	2.5/5 stars

Jade to the Max is the debut studio album by American R&B group Jade, released in 1992. The album produced the hit singles "I Wanna Love You" (U.S. No. 16), "Don't Walk Away" (U.S. No. 4), "One Woman" (U.S. No. 22), and "Looking for Mr. Do Right" (U.S. No. 69). It also contains covers of two songs by the 1970s R&B trio the Emotions – "Don't Ask My Neighbor" and "Blessed".

The album peaked at No. 56 on the Billboard 200, No. 19 on the Top R&B/Hip-Hop Albums, and No. 10 on the Top Heatseekers, and sold more than one million copies.

== Track listing ==
- Credits adapted from liner notes

No.	Title	Writer(s)	Length
1.	"Don't Walk Away"	Vassal Benford, Ronald Spearman, Stevie Wonder	4:44
2.	"I Wanna Love You"	Benford, Spearman	4:31
3.	"I Want 'Cha Baby"	Benford, Spearman	4:30
4.	"That Boy"	Benford, Carol Duboc	4:03
5.	"Out with the Girls"	Benford, Spearman	4:03
6.	"Hold Me Close"	Benford, Tony Haynes	4:26
7.	"One Woman"	Benford, Spearman	4:49
8.	"Give Me What I'm Missing"	Joi Marshall, Myron McKinley, Angela Slates	5:11
9.	"Looking for Mr. Do Right"	Alton "Wokie" Stewart	6:17
10.	"Don't Ask My Neighbors"	Skip Scarborough	4:17
11.	"Blessed"	Jerry Peters, Maurice White	5:10

== Personnel ==
=== Jade ===
- Joi Marshall – vocals
- Tonya Kelly – vocals
- Di Reed – vocals

=== Personnel ===
- Vassal Benford – keyboards, multi-instruments
- Emzie Parker, Jr. – guitars
- Gerald Albright – saxophone
- Lanar Brantley – bass
- Ronald Spearman – drum and keyboard programming
- Victor Flores – recording engineer, mixing
- Conley Abrams – recording engineer, mixing
- Cassandra Mills – executive producer
- Steve Hall – mastering
