= Kanye West discography =

Kanye West discography encompasses:

- Kanye West albums discography, a list of albums released by Kanye West
- Kanye West production discography, a list of works produced by Kanye West
- Kanye West singles discography, a list of singles released by Kanye West

== See also ==
- Kanye West videography, a list of music videos, video albums and other media appearances by Kanye West
- List of songs recorded by Kanye West, a list of all songs officially released by Kanye West
