= One Woman =

1993 single by Jade

Single by Jade

from the album Jade to the Max
- Released: 1993
- Length: 4:49
- Label: Giant; Reprise
- Songwriters: Vassal Benford; Ronald Spearman
- Producer: Vassal Benford

Jade singles chronology
| "Don't Walk Away" (1992) | "One Woman" (1993) | "Looking for Mr. Do Right" (1993) |

Music video
- "One Woman" Video on YouTube

"One Woman" is a song by American girl group Jade, released in 1993 by Giant and Reprise as the third single from their debut album, Jade to the Max (1992). The song was the follow-up to their successful hit single "Don't Walk Away" and peaked at number 22 on both the US Billboard Hot 100 and the UK Singles Chart. It was written by Vassal Benford and Ronald Spearman, and produced by Benford.

== Critical reception ==
Alan Jones from Music Week gave the song three out of five, writing, "Tonya, Joi and Di wrap their tonsils round a stylish and sophisticated soul ballad that is already getting heavy play from specialist radio and has great crossover potential. The addition of radically different mixes of their hit "Don't Walk Away" should give it added impetus."

== Charts ==
| Chart (1993) | Peak position |
|---|---|
| Australia (ARIA) | 150 |
| Europe (Eurochart Hot 100) | 74 |
| Europe (European Dance Radio) | 13 |
| UK Singles (Official Charts) | 22 |
| UK Airplay (ERA) | 42 |
| US Billboard Hot 100 | 22 |
| US Hot R&B Singles (Billboard) | 16 |
| US Rhythmic Top 40 (Billboard) | 3 |
| US Cash Box Top 100 | 19 |

== Release history ==
| Region | Date | Format(s) | Label(s) | Ref. |
|---|---|---|---|---|
| United States | 1993 | 12-inch vinyl; cassette | Giant; Reprise | |
| United Kingdom | September 6, 1993 | 7-inch vinyl; 12-inch vinyl; CD; cassette | Giant | |
