= I Wanna Love You (Jade song) =

1992 single by Jade

Single by Jade

from the album Jade to the Max and Class Act soundtrack
- Released: September 1, 1992
- Label: Giant
- Songwriters: Vassal Benford; Ronald Spearman
- Producer: Vassal Benford

Jade singles chronology
"I Wanna Love You" (1992)	"Don't Walk Away" (1992)

"I Wanna Love You" is a song by American girl group Jade, released in September 1992 by Giant Records as the debut single from their first album, Jade to the Max (1992). The song was written by Vassal Benford and Ronald Spearman, and produced by Benford. It was also included on the soundtrack to the 1992 film Class Act, starring Kid 'n Play. "I Wanna Love You" peaked at number 16 on both the US Billboard Hot 100 and Cash Box Top 100 charts.

== Critical reception ==
Alan Jones from Music Week gave the song three out of five, writing that "this belated follow-up [to 'Don't Walk Away'] is less compulsive, but an attractive confection nonetheless. A good radio record, with middling chart potential."

== Charts ==
=== Weekly charts ===
Chart (1992–1993)	Peak position
Australia (ARIA)	96
Europe (Eurochart Hot 100)	40
New Zealand (Recorded Music NZ)	24
UK Singles (Official Charts)	13
UK Airplay (Music Week)	13
UK Club Chart (Music Week)	63
US Billboard Hot 100	16
US Hot R&B/Hip-Hop Songs (Billboard)	7
US Rhythmic Airplay (Billboard)	3
US Cash Box Top 100	16

=== Year-end charts ===
Chart (1992)	Position
US Billboard Hot 100	83
US Hot R&B/Hip-Hop Songs (Billboard)	66

== Release history ==
Region	Date	Format(s)	Label(s)	Ref.
United States	September 1, 1992	7-inch vinyl; 12-inch vinyl; CD; cassette	Giant	
United Kingdom	June 21, 1993	7-inch vinyl; 12-inch vinyl; CD; cassette	Giant	
