= Don't Walk Away (Jade song) =

1992 single by Jade

Single by Jade

from the album Jade to the Max
- Released: November 23, 1992
- Genre: New jack swing; R&B
- Length: 4:44 (album version); 3:37 (with intro edit)
- Label: Giant
- Songwriters: Vassal Benford III; Ronald Spearman
- Producers: Vassal Benford III; Ronald Spearman

Jade singles chronology
"I Wanna Love You" (1992)	"Don't Walk Away" (1992)	"One Woman" (1993)

Music video
- "Don't Walk Away" on YouTube

"Don't Walk Away" is a song by American R&B group Jade, released in November 1992, by Giant Records, as the second single from their debut album, Jade to the Max (1992). It samples the drums from Kool & the Gang's 1975 song "Jungle Jazz" and the chords progression from Stevie Wonder's 1982 song "That Girl". The song was both written and produced by Vassal Benford III and Ronald Spearman, and peaked at number two on the US Billboard Hot R&B/Hip-Hop Songs chart and number four on the Billboard Hot 100. Outside of the United States, it also peaked within the top 10 in the United Kingdom and the Netherlands, reaching respectively number seven and nine. Its music video was directed by Eric Meza. The success of the single landed the trio spots on The Tonight Show, The Arsenio Hall Show, and Top of the Pops in the United Kingdom.

In 2017, Billboard magazine ranked the song number 52 on their list of "100 Greatest Girl Group Songs of All Time". The bassline of the song was sampled by A Tribe Called Quest for the song "Award Tour", from the album Midnight Marauders. The first verse and chorus were interpolated in Diplo and Sleepy Tom's 2015 dance track "Be Right There".

== Critical reception ==
William Cooper from AllMusic felt the song is "so infectious and irresistible", adding that it "may be a familiar tune heard on the radio years after its success". Upon the release, Larry Flick from Billboard magazine wrote, "'I Wanna Love You' from the soundtrack to Class Act laid a fine foundation for this soft-yet-percussive midtempo romp. Charming female trio walks the stylistic line dividing En Vogue-ish urban flash and Exposé-esque pop flair. Catchy chorus ensures heavy multiformat radio action."

In his weekly UK chart commentary, James Masterton said, "The cynic in me has the temptation to label this track as sanitised West coast production pop of the kind US FM radio is so enamoured with. Certainly all-girl groups of this particular genre never seem to make much of an impression over here, except it seems at this time of year. Predictions as to the future chart success of this one are divided but it is harmless and inoffensive enough to be an Easter hit." A reviewer from Music & Media noted, "Hot on the heels of En Vogue, this female vocal group is already top 10 in the UK. The beat gets any person out of their arm chair, and the lyrics could make a guy walk on clouds." Mark Kinchen for Music Week's RM Dance Update wrote, "Jade just catches me with great harmonies in the chorus. The trio's great vocals are backed by a slamming hip hop style track. When you play this one, play it very loud!"

== Music video ==
A music video was produced to promote the single, written and directed by Eric Meza. He also directed videos for Public Enemy and N.W.A. It begins with a group of men hanging out by their cars. One of them is using a car phone to call the group. Jade then performs the song as they dance on the sidewalk, while people around them are watching and/or dancing. Other scenes shows the group singing on a staircase in the locality. In the end, the girls are seen in one of the cars, as it slowly drives away.

== Legacy ==
"Don't Walk Away" was awarded one of BMI's Pop Awards in 1994, honoring the songwriters, composers and music publishers of the song. In 2017, Billboard magazine ranked the song number 52 on their list of "100 Greatest Girl Group Songs of All Time".

== Formats and track listings ==
- 7-inch vinyl
1. "Don't Walk Away" (Pop Walk)
2. "Don't Walk Away" (Album Walk)
- 7-inch vinyl
1. "Don't Walk Away"
2. "Looking For Me Do Right"
- 12-inch vinyl
1. "Don't Walk Away" (Album Walk)
2. "Don't Walk Away" (A Cappella Walk)
3. "Don't Walk Away" (Instrumental Walk)
4. "Don't Walk Away" (TV Walk)
- CD single
1. "Don't Walk Away" (Pop Walk)
2. "Don't Walk Away" (Lite Walk)
3. "Don't Walk Away" (Dark Walk)
4. "Don't Walk Away" (Mack Daddy Stroll)
5. "Don't Walk Away" (Album Walk)
- Cassette single
1. "Don't Walk Away" (Album Walk)
2. "Don't Walk Away" (Instrumental Walk)

== Charts ==
=== Weekly charts ===
Chart (1992–1993)	Peak position
Australia (ARIA)	72
Austria (Ö3 Austria Top 40)	25
Belgium (Ultratop 50 Flanders)	50
Canada Top Singles (RPM)	65
Europe (Eurochart Hot 100)	33
Europe (European Dance Radio)	1
Europe (European Hit Radio)	33
Germany (GfK)	26
Ireland (IRMA)	16
Israel (Israeli Singles Chart)	20
Netherlands (Dutch Top 40)	9
Netherlands (Single Top 100)	15
New Zealand (Recorded Music NZ)	28
Sweden (Sverigetopplistan)	23
UK Singles (Official Charts)	7
UK Airplay (Music Week)	22
UK Dance (Music Week)	4
US Billboard Hot 100	4
US Hot R&B/Hip-Hop Songs (Billboard)	2
US Maxi-Singles Sales (Billboard)	20
US Pop Airplay (Billboard)	5
US Rhythmic Airplay (Billboard)	1
US Cash Box Top 100	4

=== Year-end charts ===
Chart (1993)	Position
Europe (European Dance Radio)	13
Netherlands (Dutch Top 40)	75
Netherlands (Single Top 100)	86
UK Singles (OCC)	75
US Billboard Hot 100	13
US Hot R&B Singles (Billboard)	8
US Cash Box Top 100	6

== Certifications ==
Region	Certification	Certified units/sales
New Zealand (RMNZ)	Gold	15,000^{‡}
United Kingdom (BPI)	Silver	200,000^{‡}
United States (RIAA)	Gold	600,000
^{‡} Sales+streaming figures based on certification alone.

== Release history ==
Region	Date	Format(s)	Label(s)	Ref.
United States	November 23, 1992	7-inch vinyl; 12-inch vinyl; CD; cassette	Giant	
United Kingdom	March 8, 1993	7-inch vinyl; 12-inch vinyl; CD; cassette	Giant	
Australia	May 10, 1993	CD; cassette	Giant	

== Javine version ==
"Don't Walk Away"

Single by Javine

from the album Surrender
- A-side: "You've Got a Friend"
- Released: August 9, 2004
- Length: 3:00
- Label: Innocent, Virgin
- Songwriters: Vassal Benford III, Ronald Spearman
- Producer: Stargate

Javine singles chronology
"Best of My Love" (2004)	"Don't Walk Away" (2004)	"Touch My Fire" (2005)

"Don't Walk Away" was covered by British R&B singer Javine. It was also released with "You've Got a Friend", a cover of the Carole King classic, as a double A-side. The single peaked at number 16 on the UK Singles Chart.

=== Formats and track listings ===
- CD: 1
1. "Don't Walk Away"
2. "You've Got a Friend"
- CD: 2
1. "Don't Walk Away"
2. "Don't Walk Away" (Armand Van Helden club mix)
3. "Don't Walk Away" (Soda Club edit)
4. "Don't Walk Away" (Bad Boy remix)

=== Charts ===
Chart (2004)	Peak position
Scottish Singles Sales (Official Charts)	20
UK Singles (Official Charts)	16
UK Hip Hop/R&B (Official Charts)	4
