= Surrender (Your Love) =

2003 single by Javine

Single by Javine

from the album Surrender
- B-side: "Promise"
- Released: 10 November 2003
- Length: 3:08
- Label: Innocent; Virgin
- Songwriters: Javine Hylton; Nickolas Ashford; Valerie Simpson; Francis White
- Producers: Eg White; StarGate

Javine singles chronology
"Real Things" (2003)	"Surrender (Your Love)" (2003)	"Best of My Love" (2004)

"Surrender (Your Love)" is the second single released by English singer-songwriter Javine. The single, which features a sample of Diana Ross's "Surrender", reached number 15 on the UK Singles Chart.

== Track listings ==
UK CD1

1. "Surrender (Your Love)" – 3:07
2. "Surrender (Your Love)" (Obi & Josh Remix) – 3:16

UK CD2

1. "Surrender (Your Love)" – 3:07
2. "Promise" – 3:37
3. "Surrender (Your Love)" (Obi & Josh Remix) – 3:16
4. "Surrender (Your Love)" (video & photo gallery) – 3:07

== Charts ==
Weekly chart performance for "Surrender (Your Love)"
Chart (2003)	Peak position
Scottish Singles Sales (Official Charts)	22
UK Singles (Official Charts)	15
UK Hip Hop/R&B (Official Charts)	10
