= Every Day of the Week =

1994 single by Jade

Single by Jade

from the album Mind, Body & Song
- B-side: "5-4-3-2 (Yo! Time Is Up)"
- Released: September 23, 1994
- Genre: R&B; new jack swing
- Length: 5:16
- Label: Giant
- Songwriters: Antonina Armato; Ken Miller; Robert Jerald
- Producers: Cassandra Mills; Robert Jerald

Jade singles chronology
"5-4-3-2 (Yo! Time Is Up)" (1994)	"Every Day of the Week" (1994)	"Keep on Risin'" (1997)

Music video
- "Every Day of the Week" on VH1.com

"Every Day of the Week" is a song by American R&B group Jade, released in September 1994 by Giant Records as the second and final single from their second studio album, Mind, Body & Song (1994). The song is written by Antonina Armato, Ken Miller and Robert Jerald, while Jerald and Cassandra Mills produced it. It is also the group's last appearance to date on the US Billboard Hot 100, peaking at number 20. The accompanying music video was directed by German director Marcus Nispel.

== Critical reception ==
Larry Flick from Billboard magazine wrote, "New-jill swingers mine their cool Mind, Body & Soul set and pull out this midtempo shoulder-shaker. Craftily constructed hook sticks to the brain upon impact, and the vocals are strong without being overpowering. Single also can be found on the second soundtrack to Beverly Hills 90210. The potential for multiformat domination is formidable." Steve Baltin from Cash Box noted that "they demonstrate the savvy to know not to mess with a good thing as they follow the straight road with a mid-tempo beat and pleasant harmonies." Pan-European magazine Music & Media stated that "these ladies dare to put the sex into new jill swing."

== Charts ==
=== Weekly charts ===
Chart (1994–1995)	Peak position
Australia (ARIA)	138
Canada Top Singles (RPM)	85
Europe (European Dance Radio)	12
Germany (GfK)	79
Scotland (OCC)	52
UK Singles (Official Charts)	19
UK Pop Tip Club Chart (Music Week)	14
US Billboard Hot 100	20
US Hot R&B Singles (Billboard)	15
US Rhythmic (Billboard)	13
US Pop Airplay (Billboard)	12
US Cash Box Top 100	7

=== Year-end-charts ===
Chart (1995)	Position
US Billboard Hot 100	74
US Cash Box Top 100	33
