= Jade (group) =

American girl group from Chicago, Illinois

- Origin: Chicago, Illinois, U.S.
- Genres: R&B; new jack swing; hip hop soul
- Years active: 1991–1995; 1997; 2014; 2021–2024
- Label: Giant
- Past members: Joi Marshall; Tonya Kelly; Di Reed
- Website: officialjademusic.com

Jade is an American musical girl group, formed in 1991, consisting of Di Reed, Tonya Kelly, and Joi Marshall. They have sold more than 2 million records worldwide. They are recognized as one of the earliest music acts in the new jack swing genre.

The group first saw mainstream success with the release of their debut platinum-selling album, Jade to the Max, in November 1992, on Giant Records. The album spawned the US Billboard Hot 100 top-charting singles "I Wanna Love You" and "Don't Walk Away". Jade followed up by touring as the opening act for several notable music acts. Their performance at Washington, D.C.'s BET Studios was recorded and released as a live album titled BET's Listening Party in August 1993. In September 1994, Jade resurfaced with the release of their second studio album Mind, Body & Song. The album spawned the singles "5-4-3-2 (Yo! Time Is Up)" and "Every Day of the Week".

Despite critical and commercial success, the group disbanded after earning a gold-certification for their second album. Since the group's disbandment in late 1995, Tonya Kelly and Joi Marshall reunited and released a single titled "Keep on Rising" in 1997. In 2018, a reunion tour was planned but failed to materialize with all three original members. Kelly and Marshall instead hired a new lead vocalist Myracle Holloway to perform as the third member, replacing original lead vocalist Di Reed.

== History ==
=== 1991–1993: Early beginnings and Jade to the Max ===
In 1991, Joi Marshall, Angela Slates, and Debra Mitchell formed a group called JAD and was signed to Giant Records. They were paired with American music producer Vassal Benford who would produce their album. During the recording of their album, Mitchell and Slates were replaced with singers Tonya Kelly and Di Reed at the behest of Benford in May 1992. Following the lineup change, the group changed their name to Jade. Debra Mitchell later became a member of the short-lived R&B group Vybe and Angela Slates continued her career as a songwriter.

The group debuted on the soundtrack of American comedy film Class Act in June 1992 with their song "I Wanna Love You". Released as a single in September 1992, "I Wanna Love You" peaked at number sixteen on the Billboard Hot 100 and number seven on the US Hot R&B/Hip-Hop Singles & Tracks. Their debut album, Jade to the Max, was released on November 17, 1992. The album peaked at number fifty-six on the Billboard 200 and number nineteen on the Billboard Top R&B/Hip-Hop Albums. It sold over a million copies in the United States alone, earning a platinum certification by the Recording Industry Association of America (RIAA). Jade released their second single, "Don't Walk Away", in the same month. The song became more commercially successful than their predecessor, peaking at number two on the Billboard Hot R&B/Hip-Hop Singles & Tracks chart and number four on the Billboard Hot 100. Their follow-up singles "One Woman" and "Looking for Mr. Do Right" were also successful on the charts.

The group went on concert tour throughout 1993, performing at various summer festivals and making various television appearances. Jade recorded a live album and concert film at BET Studios in Washington, D.C. in early 1993. They released their live album BET's Listening Party on August 31, 1993, which peaked at number sixty-seven on the US Top R&B/Hip-Hop Albums chart.

=== 1994–1995: Mind, Body & Song ===
In April 1994, Jade appeared as The New York Dream Machine in the romantic comedy-drama film The Inkwell. On September 27, 1994, they released their second album Mind, Body & Song. The album peaked at number eighty on the Billboard 200 and number two on the US Top R&B/Hip-Hop Albums. In August 1994, the album's lead single, "5-4-3-2 (Yo! Time Is Up)", peaked at number thirteen on the US Hot R&B/Hip-Hop Songs chart. Its follow-up single, "Every Day of the Week", performed more successful than its predecessor and peaked at number twenty on the Billboard Hot 100 and number fifteen on the US Hot R&B/Hip-Hop Songs chart. Jade appeared on Beverly Hills, 90210's "You've Got To Have Heart", which aired on February 8, 1995, performing their single "Every Day of the Week". By March 1995, Mind, Body & Song had sold over a half of million copies in United States, earning a gold certification from the Recording Industry Association of America (RIAA). In April 1995, the group featured on the song "Freedom (Theme from Panther)" for the soundtrack of drama film Panther.

=== 1995–present: Disbandment and aftermath ===
In late 1995, the group disbanded and pursued individual careers. In 1997, Marshall and Kelly briefly reformed Jade and recorded the song "Keep on Risin" for the soundtrack of sports comedy film The Sixth Man. Although the song peaked at number fifty on the Hot R&B/Hip-Hop Songs chart, Marshall and Kelly later disbanded.

Following the group's disbandment, Di Reed continued her music career. She began an in-demand session singer and backup singer, performing with became a backup singer for Rod Stewart, Stevie Wonder, and Smokey Robinson. Tonya Kelly pursued a career as an interior designer. Joi Marshall released an album titled Testimony & Praise in 2007. In 2014, Marshall and Kelly again reunited, without Reed, and released a single titled "Baby Luv". In February 2018, Marshall released her debut solo single "Love Language."

Later in 2018, Kelly, Marshall, and Reed planned to reunite for a reunion tour and jointly applied for the "Jade" service mark, which was approved in 2019. However, the reunion tour did not materialize, and in 2021, Marshall and Harris began performing with American singer, Myracle Holloway, as Jade or Ladies of Jade. The group eventually performed on the 90's Kickback Concert Tour without Reed. Although Reed reached out to Marshall and Kelly to resolve the matter, Marshall and Kelly continued performing with Holloway. In December 2021, Reed sued Marshall, Kelly, and Holloway for dilution and infringement of the "Jade" service mark, unfair competition through false designation of origin and false advertising; as well as violations of Texas statutory and common law. The court ruled in Marshall and Kelly's favor as emphasized that "co-owners have the right to use the mark as they please, and a valid licensee of one co-owner cannot be liable to another co-owner for infringement." In 2022, Di Reed continued performing as a solo artist.

== Discography ==
=== Studio albums ===
Year	Album details	Peak chart positions						Certifications
Year	Album details	US	US R&B	AUS	GER	NL	UK	Certifications
1992	Jade to the Max: Released: November 17, 1992; Label: Giant	56	19	126	82	48	43	RIAA: Platinum
1994	Mind, Body & Song: Released: September 27, 1994; Label: Giant	80	16	189	—	—	—	RIAA: Gold

=== Live albums ===
Year	Album details	Peak
Year	Album details	US R&B
1993	BET's Listening Party: Released: August 31, 1993; Label: Giant	67

=== Singles ===
Year	Title	Peak chart positions										Certifications	Album
Year	Title	US	US R&B	AUS	AUT	CAN	GER	NL	NZ	SWE	UK	Certifications	Album
1992	"I Wanna Love You"	16	7	96	—	69	—	—	24	—	13		Jade to the Max
1992	"Don't Walk Away"	4	2	72	25	65	26	9	28	23	7	RIAA: Gold; BPI: Silver	Jade to the Max
1993	"One Woman"	22	16	150	—	—	—	—	—	—	22		Jade to the Max
1993	"Looking for Mr. Do Right"	69	16	—	—	—	—	—	—	—	—		Jade to the Max
1994	"5-4-3-2 (Yo! Time Is Up)"	72	13	—	—	—	—	—	—	—	—		Mind, Body & Song
1994	"Every Day of the Week"	20	15	138	—	85	79	—	—	—	19		Mind, Body & Song
1997	"Keep on Risin'" (featuring Lil' Rachett & Vaz)	—	50	—	—	—	—	—	—	—	—		The 6th Man
2014	“Baby Luv”	—	—	—	—	—	—	—	—	—	—		Non-album single

==== Featured singles ====
Year	Title	Artist	Peak chart positions			Album
Year	Title	Artist	US	US R&B	UK	Album
1993	"All Thru the Nite"	P.O.V.	120	31	32	Handin' Out Beatdowns
1995	"Freedom"	Various Artists	45	18	—	Panther

== Awards and nominations ==
Year	Award
1995	MTV Video Music Award nomination for Best R&B Video, "5-4-3-2 (Yo! Time Is Up)"
