= BET's Listening Party =

Live album by Jade
- Released: August 31, 1993
- Genres: R&B, pop
- Label: Giant Records

Jade chronology
| Jade to the Max (1992) | BET's Listening Party (1993) | Mind, Body & Song (1994) |

BET's Listening Party is the second album by R&B group Jade. It was released in summer of 1993 and is a live album.

== Track listing ==
1. "Settle Down"
2. "Intro"
3. "I Wanna Love You"
4. "Don't Walk Away (Intro)"
5. "Don't Ask My Neighbors"
6. "Blessed"
7. "Mr. Do Right"
8. "One Woman"
9. "Do Me Baby"
10. "I Want 'Cha Baby"
11. "Rock Steady"
12. "Don't Walk Away"
