= Javine Hylton =

English singer and songwriter (born 1981)

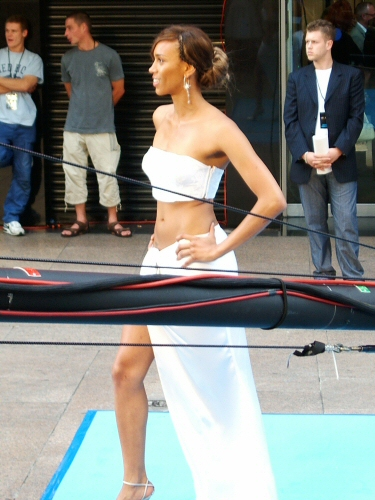
- Hylton in 2005

Background information
- Also known as: Javine
- Born: Javine Dionne Hylton; 27 December 1981 (age 44); Kensington, London, England
- Genres: R&B; hip hop; soul
- Occupations: Singer; songwriter
- Years active: 2002–2013
- Labels: Innocent; Virgin; Island

Javine Dionne Hylton (born 27 December 1981), often known mononymously as Javine, is an English former singer and songwriter. She gained recognition on ITV's Popstars: The Rivals and represented the UK at the Eurovision Song Contest 2005 with "Touch My Fire". Javine's cover version of "You've Got a Friend" was the theme music to Garfield: The Movie in 2004.

== Early life ==
Hylton was born in Kensington and grew up in Ladbroke Grove.

From a young age, she had a passion for dance: "I didn't like singing. I started stage school at 10, because at my normal school, there were always fights. So I thought, what do I want to do? I want to dance."

For two years, Hylton played Nala in a production of The Lion King in London's West End. Following the end of the run, she began writing songs and pursuing a career in music.

She auditioned for ITV's Popstars: The Rivals, a reality television talent show in which young hopefuls sought to be picked for a place in a new manufactured group.

She was one of the last six contenders for a place in the girl group, but she lost out on a spot in what later became the chart-topping group Girls Aloud. She instead embarked on a solo singing career.

== Career ==
In the summer of 2003, Hylton released her debut single "Real Things", which featured a sample of M.O.P.'s hit "Ante Up". The single charted in the UK Singles Chart at Number 4, and remains her biggest hit to date. Three further Top 20 hits from her debut album followed, "Surrender (Your Love)" (which sampled the Diana Ross hit "Surrender"), "Best of My Love" and a cover of Jade's "Don't Walk Away", a double A-side with a cover of Carole King's "You've Got a Friend".

Hylton's debut album, Surrender, was released after her third single in the summer of 2004. In spite of securing a songwriting partnership with Eg White, and record producers Stargate, along with the singles performing relatively well, her debut album only just managed to get into the UK Albums Chart and as a result she was dropped by her record label in late 2004, despite the moderate success of the album's singles that were released on their own.

Hylton featured on Richard X's 2003 album Richard X Presents His X-Factor Vol. 1. Her collaboration with him, "You Used To", was due to be released as a single, but it was cancelled.

In late 2003, she became an opening act for American rapper Nelly on the UK leg of his international tour.

In October 2013, Hylton teamed up with DJs WAWA and M.A.R.K to release the track "Never". The song was met with widespread acclaim. Digital Spy called it an "uptempo club number", while in an 8/10 review Popjustice labelled it a "belter".

== Eurovision 2005 ==
On 5 March 2005, Hylton won Eurovision: Making Your Mind Up, the UK heat of the Eurovision Song Contest 2005, singing "Touch My Fire", co-written by her. The other contestants were the 1996 UK entrant Gina G, Andy Scott-Lee, the group Tricolore, and Katie Price. During the performance, tape used to hold her dress in place came loose, causing a 'wardrobe malfunction'. Hylton went on to represent the UK in the final in Kyiv, reportedly suffering from a throat infection. With pre-final odds of 33/1, she finished with 18 points, in 22nd place, ahead of France and Germany. When "Touch My Fire" was released as a single, it became her fifth consecutive Top 20 hit, reaching Number 18 in the UK Singles Chart.

== Other work ==
In 2004, Hylton was the face of Dasani water, but was dropped when the product was withdrawn from the UK market due to bad publicity. She has also appeared in Series 4 of the Channel 4 programme The Games in 2006, which she went on to win.

In a 2006 Christmas edition of Never Mind the Buzzcocks with Simon Amstell, the show was dedicated to the birthdays of both Jesus and Hylton, on account of her birthday being two days after Christmas. In 2007, she took part in BBC Three's Celebrity Scissorhands.

In 2008, she was the first celebrity eliminated from The Underdog Show. In 2009, she made an uncredited guest appearance on the television show Skins.

In 2010, she appeared on Celebrity Come Dine with Me and came second overall. In 2012, Hylton was due to star as 'Lucretia MacEvil' in the UK touring production of Disco Inferno; however the tour was cancelled. In the same year, Javine was a contestant on Celebrity Masterchef until being eliminated along with Cheryl Baker.

== Personal life ==
Hylton has a child with Michael Harvey, Jr., a daughter, born February 2008. Hylton has since had another child, a son.

In March 2006, Hylton pleaded guilty to driving with excess alcohol and was banned from driving for 18 months.

== Discography ==
=== Studio albums ===
List of studio albums, with selected details and chart positions
Title	Details	Peak chart positions		Certifications
Title	Details	UK	JPN	Certifications
Surrender	Released: 28 June 2004; Formats: CD, digital download; Label: Innocent/Virgin	73	18	RIAJ: Gold

=== Singles ===
==== As lead artist ====
Year	Title	Peak chart positions				Album
Year	Title	UK	AUS	BEL	IRL	Album
2003	"Real Things"	4	60	44	23	Surrender
2003	"Surrender (Your Love)"	15	—	—	—	Surrender
2004	"Best of My Love"	18	—	—	49	Surrender
2004	"Don't Walk Away" / "You've Got a Friend"	16	—	—	—	Surrender
2005	"Touch My Fire"	18	—	—	32	Non-album singles
2011	"Child of Desire"	—	—	—	—	Non-album singles
"—" denotes releases that did not chart or were not released.

==== As featured artist ====
Year	Title	Peak chart positions		Album
Year	Title	UK	NLD	Album
2003	"You Used To" (with Richard X)	—	—	Richard X Presents His X-Factor Vol. 1
2006	"Don't Let the Morning Come" (with Soul Avengerz)	49	89	Non-album singles
2013	"Never" (with Wawa & M.A.R.K)	—	—	Non-album singles
"—" denotes releases that did not chart or were not released.

Preceded by James Fox with "Hold On to Our Love"	UK in the Eurovision Song Contest; 2005	Succeeded by Daz Sampson with "Teenage Life"
