= Laurneá Wilkerson =

American singer, songwriter and actress

Laurneá Wilkerson is an American singer, songwriter and actress. Under the name Laurneá, she has released four studio albums including Betta Listen in 1997, which includes the singles "Can't Let Go" (#55 on the US Billboard 100, #20 on Hot R&B/Hip-Hop Songs), "Infatuation" (#37 on Hot R&B/Hip-Hop Songs) and "Days of Youth" (#36 in the UK Singles Chart). Wilkerson has also sung vocals for the bands Arrested Development and Loose Ends.

Wilkerson has appeared in the films Hoodlum, School Daze and Sing.

== Discography ==
=== Studio albums ===
- 1997: Betta Listen (Top R&B/Hip-Hop Albums #80)
- 2000: Laurneá II
- 2003: New Territory
- 2005: I Remember

=== Compilation albums ===
- 2006: The Collection
