= Surrender (Javine album) =

Studio album by Javine
- Released: 28 June 2004
- Genre: Hip hop; soul; R&B
- Length: 44:12
- Label: Innocent; Virgin
- Producer: Martin Harrington; Liam Howe; Ash Howes; StarGate; Twin; Marius De Vries; Eg White; Johnny Douglas; Soulpower

Japanese CD+DVD cover

Singles from Surrender
- 1. "Real Things" Released: 7 July 2003; 2. "Surrender (Your Love)" Released: 10 November 2003; 3. "Best of My Love" Released: 14 June 2004; 4. "Don't Walk Away" / "You've Got a Friend" Released: 9 August 2004

Surrender is the only studio album by English singer Javine. It was released by Innocent Records and Virgin Records on 28 June 2004 in the United Kingdom after being delayed from November 2003. The album features four singles, "Real Things", "Surrender (Your Love)", "Best of My Love" and "Don't Walk Away". In February 2005, Surrender was certified Gold in Japan.

== Critical reception ==
Professional ratings
Review scores
Source	Rating
BBC	3.5/5
The Guardian	3/5 stars
Yahoo! Music UK	4/10

Peter Robinson from The Guardian found that Surrender showcases Javine's "versatile, seductive vocal range, often recalling early Whitney Houston across convincing forays into commercial soul and futuristic R&B [...] Surrender is proof that if the reality pop format is incapable of producing, or even acknowledging, bona fide stars, it can't flatten the talent of those who escape it." BBC critic Colette Bridge called the album "an accomplished CD that could be pilfered for single after single in a Michael Jackson Thriller style, such is the quality on offer [...] Above all you get the idea that people have spent time on this collection and not been prepared to throw something out to cash in quickly. It might sound Spice Girlsy in places but then again their debut still stands up today because of the quality of the songs." musicOMH editor Linda Serck remarked that "the overall result is a selection of good tunes but with many destined for the skip button on the CD player."

== Track listing ==
Surrender track listing
No.	Title	Writer(s)	Producer(s)	Length
1.	"Real Things"	Javine Hylton; Hallgeir Rustan; Tor Erik Hermansen; Mikkel Storleer Eriksen; Jamal Gerard Grinnage; Eric Murry; Darryl Pittman	Stargate	3:22
2.	"Best of My Love"	Lindy Robbins; Simon Ellis	Johnny Douglas	3:24
3.	"Don't Walk Away"	Vassal Benford; Ronald Spearman	Stargate	3:02
4.	"Promise"	Hylton; Eg White	White	3:39
5.	"Millions"	Hylton; White; Liam Howe	White; Howe; Martin Harrington^{[a]}; Ash Howes^{[a]}	3:40
6.	"Definition of a Man"	Hylton; Joacim Persson; Niclas Molinder; Pelle Ankarberg; Lisa Greene	Twin	3:31
7.	"Where U Are"	Hylton; Rustan; Hermansen; Eriksen	Stargate	4:00
8.	"Think Twice"	Hylton; White	White	4:10
9.	"Surrender (Your Love)"	Hylton; White; Nickolas Ashford; Valerie Simpson	White; Stargate	3:07
10.	"Let Me Go"	Hylton; Angela Hunte; Carsten Schack; Karsten Dahlgaard; Peter Biker	Soulpower	3:23
11.	"Messin'"	Hylton; White	White	3:16
12.	"If You're Lonely Now" (Japan bonus track)	Hylton; Hermansen; Eriksen	Stargate	3:05
13.	"All About Us"	James McMillan; Liz Winstanley	Howes; Harrington	3:43
14.	"You've Got a Friend" (Japan bonus track)	Carole King	Marius De Vries	4:55
15.	"Missing You"	Hylton; White; Howe; Serge Faubert	White; Howe	3:57
Total length:				44:12

Notes

- ^{^[a]} signifies additional producer

== Charts ==
Chart performance for Surrender
Chart (2004)	Peak position
Japanese Albums (Oricon)	18
UK Albums (OCC)	73

== Certifications ==
Certifications for Surrender
Region	Certification	Certified units/sales
Japan (RIAJ)	Gold	100,000^{^}
^{^} Shipments figures based on certification alone.

== Release history ==
List of release dates, showing region, formats, label, editions, catalog number and reference
Region	Date	Edition(s)	Format(s)	Label
United Kingdom	28 June 2004	Standard	Digital download; CD	Innocent; Virgin
Australia	26 October 2004	Standard	Digital download; CD	Innocent; Virgin
Japan	26 July 2004	Standard	Digital download; CD	Innocent; Virgin
Japan	26 January 2005	Special	Digital download; CD	Innocent; Virgin
