= Real Things (song) =

2003 single by Javine

Single by Javine

from the album Surrender
- Released: 7 July 2003
- Length: 3:23
- Label: Innocent; Virgin
- Songwriters: Javine Hylton; StarGate; Darryl Pittman; Jamal Grinnage; Eric Murry
- Producer: StarGate

Javine singles chronology
"Real Things" (2003)	"Surrender (Your Love)" (2003)

"Real Things" is the debut single of English singer-songwriter Javine. The single, which features a sample of M.O.P.'s "Ante Up" and a lyrical interoperation of "It Don't Mean a Thing (If It Ain't Got That Swing)" by Duke Ellington and Irving Mills, reached the top five on the UK Singles Chart and is the biggest hit of her career.

== Background and meaning ==
After auditioning on the television show Popstars: The Rivals for a spot in girl group Girls Aloud, Javine missed out on a spot (finishing sixth, with five members only wanted) despite her popularity with the public and being 'too good for the band', as said by the judges. The voting claimed to be rigged by the public, as she was the show's favourite artist. Days after the show ended and the episode had aired, several record labels knocked on her door for a contract. She eventually signed to Innocent Records, home of fellow girl group Atomic Kitten.

Javine did show disappointment in the fact she did not make the cut, however said "the decision was a blessing and a curse." When asked why, she explained she could move into a more R&B-oriented career instead of the pop career the show was looking for. "Real Things" became the first piece of material to do so, and was commercially successful followed up by other tracks on her album Surrender.

"Real Things" was written by Tor Hermansen, Hallgeir Rustan, Mikkel Eriksen, Jamal Gerard Grinnage, Eric Murry, Darryl Pittman and Javine herself. Production was handled by StarGate. The song is about materialism, with the main message being someone could have everything he or she wants or needs; however, if they are out of love or are not willing to give all their love, there is no sign of interest.

== Release and reception ==
"Real Things" was released in the United Kingdom on 7 July 2003, charting at number four on the UK Singles Chart at the end of the first sales week. It became the 96th-best-selling single of the year. After becoming commercially successful in the United Kingdom, the song became heavily noticed. It eventually became the opening act for R. Kelly's concert in the UK, and also served as the 19th track on the famous SingStar platform's Party version. The cover art, however, is the album artwork, and not the official single artwork.

== Music video ==
The music video for "Real Things" was filmed in early 2003 but never had a commercial release. Eight years after it was filmed, it was finally uploaded onto YouTube in late 2011. The video begins with brief shots of Javine leaving her house. She then walks down the street as people begin to notice her and point out. Several men also glance and are interested in her, however Javine does not show the same feelings back. Instead she hangs out with her friends and in the last chorus meets up with the one, covering his eyes as he closes his shop. They walk away, holding hands. During the video, she is seen dancing in a black catsuit, dancing (with two back-ups) behind a wall which has been spray-painted 'Javine'. A then unknown Kanye West makes an appearance as a man driving a yellow sports car whom Javine rejects.

== Track listings ==
UK and Australian CD single

1. "Real Things" – 3:21
2. "Real Things" (Ignorants edit) – 3:57
3. "Real Things" (D'Influence Summer Groove mix) – 3:59
4. "Real Things" (D'Influence Lazy Days mix) – 4:09
5. "Real Things" (video) – 3:21

UK cassette single and European CD single

1. "Real Things" – 3:21
2. "Real Things" (Ignorants edit) – 3:57

UK 12-inch single

A1. "Real Things" (Ignorants extended mix) – 6:01
A2. "Real Things" – 3:21
B1. "Real Things" (D'Influence Summer Groove mix) – 3:59
B2. "Real Things" (D'Influence Lazy Days mix) – 4:09

== Charts ==
=== Weekly charts ===
Chart (2003)	Peak position
Australia (ARIA)	60
Australian Urban (ARIA)	17
Belgium (Ultratop 50 Flanders)	44
Europe (Eurochart Hot 100)	11
Ireland (IRMA)	23
Scottish Singles Sales (Official Charts)	8
UK Singles (Official Charts)	4
UK Hip Hop/R&B (Official Charts)	3

=== Year-end charts ===
Chart (2003)	Position
UK Singles (OCC)	114

== Release history ==
Region	Date	Format(s)	Label(s)	Ref.
United Kingdom	7 July 2003	12-inch vinyl; CD; cassette	Innocent; Virgin	
Australia	1 September 2003	CD	Innocent; Virgin	
