= Vassal Benford =

American music producer and music executive

Vassal G. Benford
- Born: Detroit, Michigan, United States
- Citizenship: American
- Education: Studied under jazz pianist Harold McKinney and Professor Don Nikeloff in Europe
- Occupations: Music and film composer and producer
- Known for: Producing over 70 platinum records
- Website: vassalbenford.com

Vassal Gradington Benford III is an American music producer, record executive, and film composer. Benford is the co-chairman and CEO of Benford & Canton Studios, a media production company he co-founded with producer Mark Canton, known for films such as 300, Immortals, and the Power television series. He is CEO of Certifyd, a blockchain-based music streaming and distribution platform. In addition, Benford is a managing advisor to the legacy of boxer Manny Pacquiao, and chairman of the B.B. King Estate

Benford is an executive producer of the films After and After We Collided, both of which became top-streaming titles on Netflix and collectively grossed over $300 million worldwide. As a producer, he has worked with artists including, Jennifer Lopez, Michael Bublé, Chris Brown, Jason Derulo, Diplo, Drake, Justin Bieber, Quavo, David Guetta, U2, NBA Youngboy, Gucci Mane, Nas, Rick Ross, Chanté Moore, Deborah Cox, BBD, Bobby Brown, New Edition, Steve Aoki, Swae Lee, Skrillex, Major Lazer and Marshmello. French Montana, Rick Ross, Nas, Erika Jayne, Gucci Mane, Nicki Minaj, Anuel AA, Flo Rida, B.B. King, Richie Sambora, Queen Latifah, The Jacksons, Mariah Carey, Fat Joe & Remy Ma, Kool G Rap, Bell Biv DeVoe, Bobby Brown, New Edition, The Baha Men, Tisha Campbell, Patti LaBelle, Faith Evans, Chanté Moore, Aaron Hall, Oleta Adams, and Lisa Stansfield.

In 2024, he co-produced several tracks on Chris Brown's album 11:11, which won R&B Album of the Year at the 2025 Grammy Awards. He also produced Chris Brown's single Bruce Lee.

He collaborated with Clive Davis at Arista Records under a joint partnership, discovering and signing singer Deborah Cox. He discovered and managed the R&B girl group Jade, who signed to Giant Records (a Warner Bros. subsidiary). Their debut single Don’t Walk Away spent 39 weeks on the Billboard Hot 100 and earned Benford the ASCAP Pop Music Songwriter of the Year Award. In 2017, Billboard ranked the song at number 52 on its list of the “100 Greatest Girl Group Songs of All Time.”

In 2015, Benford established The Benford Company, an entertainment firm specializing in production, artist representation and brand partnerships, including collaborations with Universal and Warner Bros. The company has been associated with clients such as figures including Manny Pacquiao and the B.B. King estate.

== Early life ==
Benford was born in Detroit, Michigan, to Bishop Henry Benford and Margret Simone Benford. He studied classical and jazz music under Harold McKinney at Michigan State University and later trained with Professor Don Nikeloff at the Swiss Conservatory. By age 16, he had begun touring and performing session work, establishing an early professional relationship with music producer Don Davis.

== Career ==
While under the mentorship of Don Davis, Benford worked with several jazz, gospel, and soul artists, including Earl Klugh, Chet Atkins, Sarah Vaughan, George Benson, Miles Davis, Tramaine Hawkins, George Clinton, and The Dramatics.

In 1996, Benford was appointed Vice President of Motown Records and entered a joint venture with the label under the name Vaz/Motown.

Benford later produced Toni Braxton’s debut album, which earned a Grammy nomination. He co-wrote and produced Be Right There for Diplo, performed by Marshmello and Major Lazer, and released additional works, including Melody Man and Dedication Song.

From 2020 to 2023, Benford was an executive producer on several films in the After film series. In 2020, he produced a tribute concert to honoring Michael Jackson at the Consumer Electronics Show (CES) in Las Vegas hosted by Magic Johnson.

In 2021, he expanded into sports-related media and managing branding efforts for Manny Pacquiao’s ventures beyond boxing.

== Film and television ==
Benford has composed or produced music for numerous films and TV series, including New Jack City, House Party 2, The Associate (starring Whoopi Goldberg), The 6th Man, Class Act, The Running Man, Melrose Place, Beverly Hills 90210, The Swan Princess, Fame LA, and Stay Cool.

== Role in the B.B. King estate ==
In 2018, Benford was appointed chairman of the B.B. King Estate. In this capacity, he oversees projects related to King’s intellectual property, including music catalogs, merchandising, and the planned biographical film. He is also leading development of a digital streaming platform called the B.B. King Blues Network.
