= List of songs recorded by 911 (English group) =

Songs recorded by 911

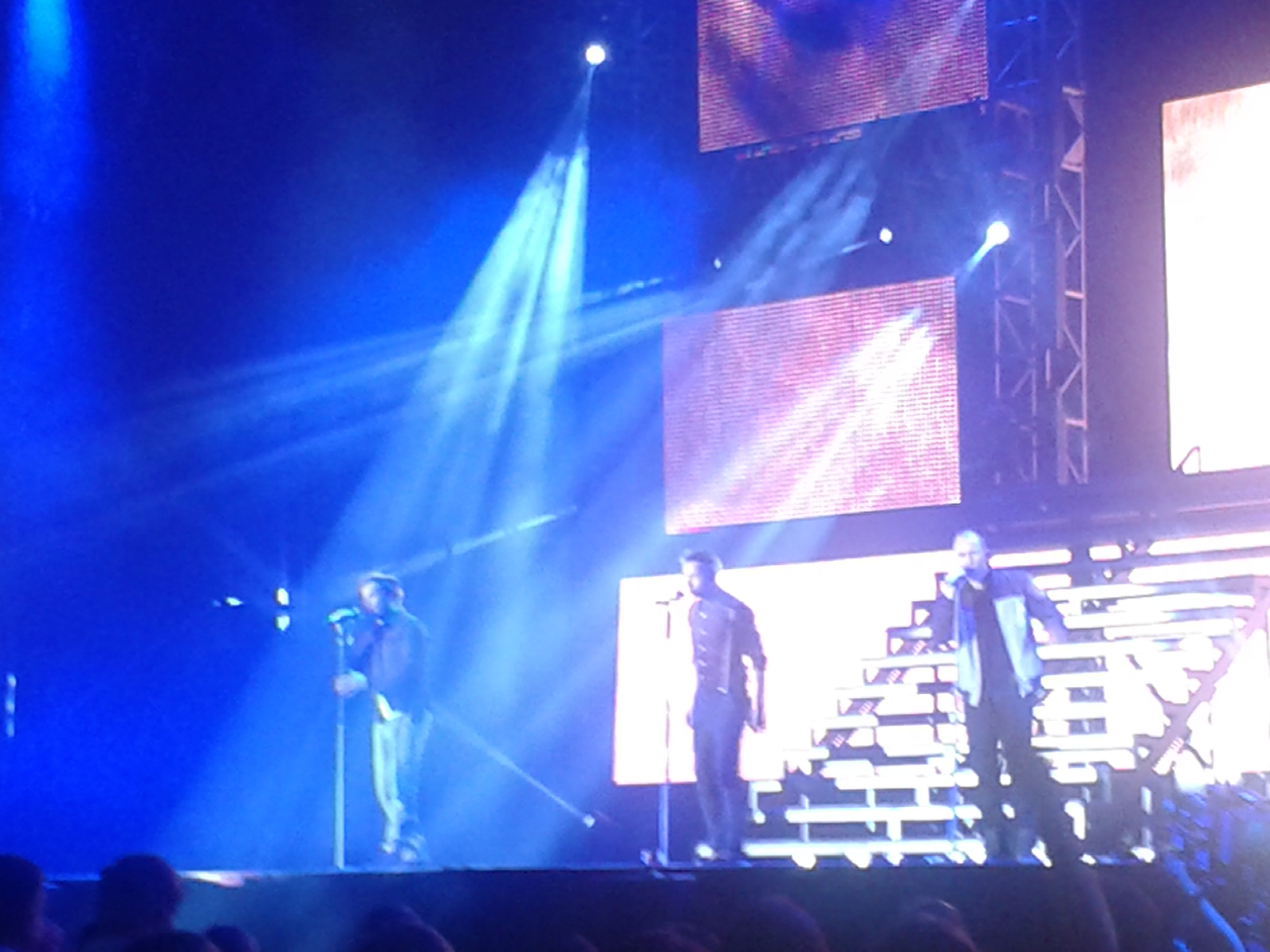
911 performing live in Glasgow, Scotland on 7 May 2013. From left to right: Jimmy Constable, Lee Brennan and Spike Dawbarn.

The following is a list of songs recorded by the British boyband 911. The band has released three studio albums: The Journey, Moving On and There It Is, as well as two greatest hits compilations.

Year	Song	Release	Writers
1996	"Don't Make Me Wait"	The Journey	John McLaughlin; Graham Goudie; Alan Rankine
1997	"Bodyshakin'"	The Journey	John McLaughlin; Graham Goudie
1997	"Can't Stop"	The Journey	John McLaughlin; Graham Goudie
1997	"The Day We Find Love"	The Journey	Eliot Kennedy; Helen Boulding
1997	"Our Last Goodbye"	The Journey	Eliot Kennedy; John McLaughlin; Lee Brennan; Jimmy Constable; Spike Dawbarn
1996	"Night to Remember"	The Journey	Leon Sylvers III; Dana Meyers; Nidra Beard
1997	"Take Good Care"	The Journey	Eliot Kennedy; Lee Brennan
1996	"Love Sensation"	The Journey	John McLaughlin; Graham Goudie
1997	"One More Try"	The Journey	John McLaughlin; Graham Goudie; Alan Rankine
1997	"The Swing"	The Journey	Eliot Kennedy; Mike Shayne
1997	"Rhythm of the Night"	The Journey	Diane Warren
1997	"The Journey"	The Journey	John McLaughlin; Lee Brennan
1996	"Vision on My Mind"	Don't Make Me Wait CD1	John McLaughlin; Graham Goudie; Lee Brennan; Jimmy Constable; Spike Dawbarn
1996	"Carefree Lover"	Don't Make Me Wait CD1	Eliot Kennedy; Helen Boulding
1997	"Look Through Any Window"	Party People, Friday Night CD1	Charles Silverman; Graham Gouldman
1998	"Let's Go Crazy"	All I Want is You CD1	Prince Nelson
1998	"All I Want Is You"	Moving On	John McLaughlin; Lee Brennan; Jimmy Constable; Spike Dawbarn; Jon Douglas
1998	"Moving On"	Moving On	John McLaughlin; Jimmy Constable; Ian Green
1998	"Baby Come Back to Me"	Moving On	John McLaughlin; Jimmy Constable; Mike Percy; Tim Lever
1998	"How Do You Want Me to Love You?"	Moving On	Carl Sturken; Evan Rogers
1998	"That's the Way"	Moving On	John McLaughlin; Dave James
1998	"New Groove Generation"	Moving On	John McLaughlin; Lee Brennan; Jimmy Constable; Spike Dawbarn; Mike Percy; Tim Lever
1998	"Make You My Baby"	Moving On	John McLaughlin; Lee Brennan; Jimmy Constable; Spike Dawbarn
1998	"Don't Walk Away"	Moving On	John McLaughlin; Dave James
1998	"Nothing Stops the Rain"	Moving On	John McLaughlin; Lee Brennan; Jimmy Constable; Spike Dawbarn; Jon Douglas
1998	"Should've Been the One"	Moving On	John McLaughlin; Dave James
1997	"Party People...Friday Night"	Moving On	John McLaughlin; Lee Brennan; Jimmy Constable; Spike Dawbarn; Mike Percy; Tim Lever; Eliot Kennedy
1998	"Hold On"	Moving On	John McLaughlin; Lee Brennan
1998	"I Believe I Can Fly"	All I Want is You CD2	R. Kelly
1998	"Jailbreak"	How Do You Want Me to Love You CD2	Phil Lynott
1998	"Forever in My Heart"	More Than a Woman CD1	John McLaughlin; Lee Brennan; Jimmy Constable; Spike Dawbarn; Phil Harding; Ian Curnow
1999	"Celebration"	Private Number CD1	Kool and the Gang
1998	"More Than a Woman"	There It Is	Barry Gibb; Robin Gibb; Maurice Gibb
1999	"Don't Take Away the Music"	There It Is	Frederick Perren; K. Lewis; C. Arian
1999	"A Little Bit More"	There It Is	Bobby Gosh
1999	"Never Gonna Give You Up"	There It Is	Mike Stock; Matt Aitken; Pete Waterman
1999	"I Wanna Get Next to You"	There It Is	Norman Whitfield
1999	"Can't Get By Without You"	There It Is	Michael Denne; Ken Gold
1999	"Rock Me Gently"	There It Is	Andy Kim
1999	"Private Number"	There It Is	William Bell; Booker T. Jones
1999	"There It Is"	There It Is	Leon Sylvers III; Dana Meyers; Nidra Beard
1999	"You're the Best Thing"	There It Is	Paul Weller
1999	"Boogie Nights"	There It Is	Rod Temperton
1999	"Wonderland"	The Greatest Hits and a Little Bit More	Christian Ballard; Russ Ballard; Andrew Murray; Lee Brennan
1999	"If You'd Only Love Me"	The Greatest Hits and a Little Bit More	Christian Ballard; Russ Ballard; Andrew Murray; Lee Brennan; Jimmy Constable; Spike Dawbarn
1999	"Reunited"	Wonderland CD1	Christian Ballard; Russ Ballard; Andrew Murray; Jimmy Constable
1999	"If You Were Mine"	Wonderland CD2	Christian Ballard; Russ Ballard; Andrew Murray; Jimmy Constable
2013	"2 Hearts 1 Love"	Illuminate... (The Hits and More)	John McLaughlin; Lee Brennan; Jimmy Constable; Jud Mahoney; Natalie DeLucia; David Thomas
2013	"Diamonds"	Illuminate... (The Hits and More)	John McLaughlin; Lee Brennan; Jimmy Constable; David Thomas
2013	"I Do"	Illuminate... (The Hits and More)	John McLaughlin; Lee Brennan; Jimmy Constable; Jud Mahoney; Natalie DeLucia
2013	"In Another Life"	Illuminate... (The Hits and More)	John McLaughlin; Lee Brennan; Jimmy Constable; Jud Mahoney; Natalie DeLucia
2013	"Light Me Up"	Illuminate... (The Hits and More)	Lee Brennan; Andrew Murray
2013	"Alive"	Illuminate... (The Hits and More)	John McLaughlin; Lee Brennan; Jimmy Constable; Jud Mahoney; Natalie DeLucia
2013	"Illuminate"	Illuminate... (The Hits and More)	John McLaughlin; Lee Brennan; Jimmy Constable; Jud Mahoney; Natalie DeLucia

== Unreleased songs ==
Year	Song	Release	Writers
Unknown	"Be Your Own Best Friend"	—	John McLaughlin; Lee Brennan; Jimmy Constable; Spike Dawbarn
Unknown	"Don't Tell Me Maybe"	—	John McLaughlin; Graham Goudie; Lee Brennan; Jimmy Constable
Unknown	"End of Every Road"	—	John McLaughlin; Lee Brennan; Paul Masterson
Unknown	"Everybody's Cried Sometime"	—	Lee Brennan; Nicky Graham; Deni Lew
Unknown	"Fountain of Love"	—	John McLaughlin; Lee Brennan; Jimmy Constable; Spike Dawbarn
Unknown	"Good Good Feeling"	—	Lee Brennan; Gary Bromham; Terry Ronald
Unknown	"Looking Back"	—	Lee Brennan; Juliette Jaimes; Jaimes Welton
Unknown	"Real Thing"	—	John McLaughlin; Graham Goudie; Lee Brennan; Jimmy Constable
Unknown	"She Said"	—	Lee Brennan; Dion; Jacques
Unknown	"Stars are Burnt" (Demo version of 'Light Me Up'. Demo remains unreleased)	—	Lee Brennan; Andrew Murray
Unknown	"Talk to Me"	—	Lee Brennan; Juliette Jaimes; Jaimes Welton; Sheppard Solomon
Unknown	"Turn It Around" (Later released as Lee Brennan's debut solo single in 2002. 911 version remains unreleased)	—	Christian Ballard; Russ Ballard; Andrew Murray; Lee Brennan
Unknown	"With These Hands"	—	Lee Brennan; Dion; Jacques
Unknown	"You Are to Me (What it is to Be)"	—	Christian Ballard; John McLaughlin; Andrew Murray; Lee Brennan
