= 911 discography =

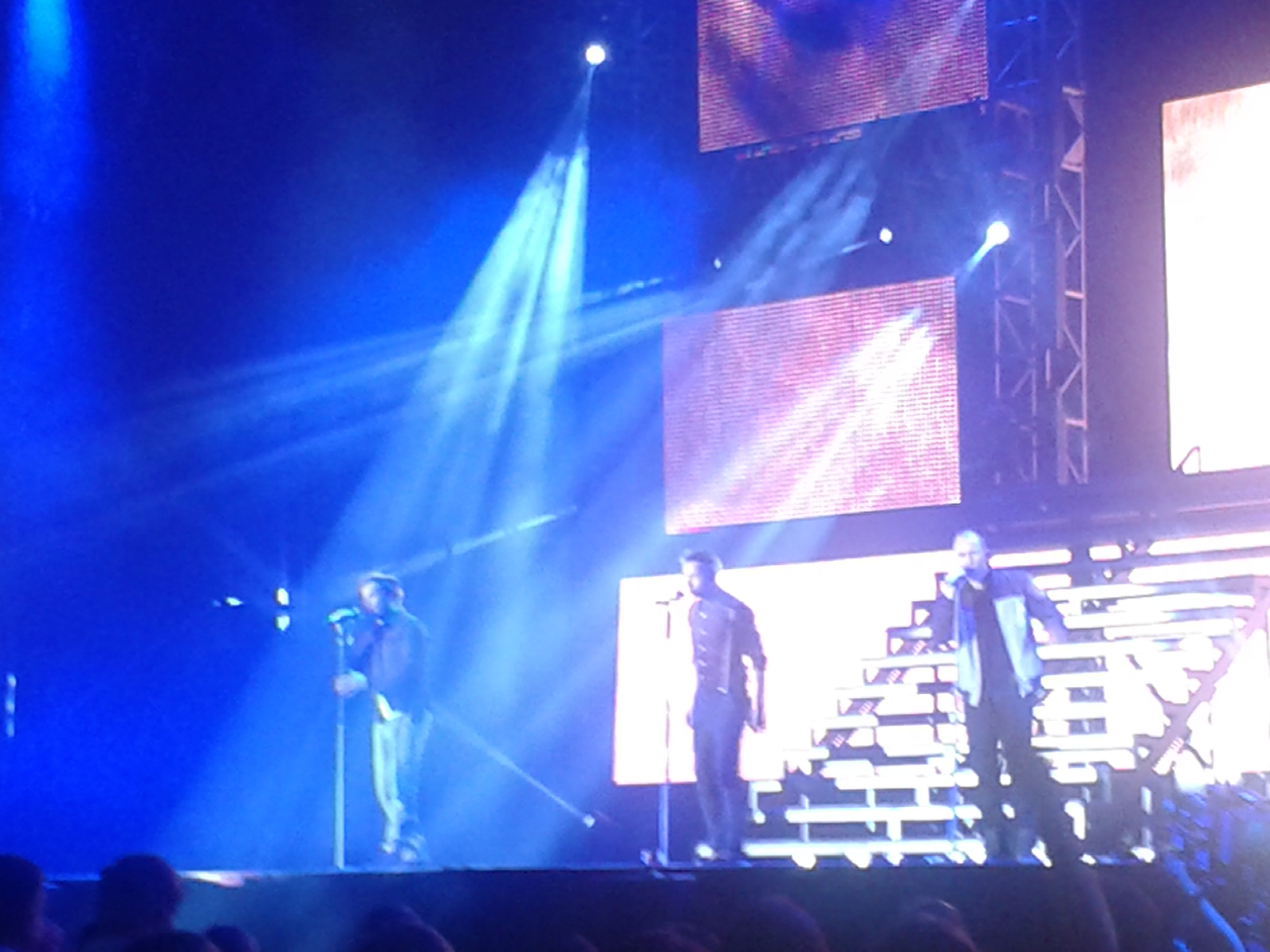
- 911 performing live in Glasgow, Scotland on 7 May 2013. (L–R: Jimmy Constable, Lee Brennan and Spike Dawbarn)
- Studio albums: 4
- Compilation albums: 1
- Singles: 13

The discography of British boy band 911 consists of 13 singles and three studio albums. They were formed in 1995 and released their debut single in May 1996. They went on to score 10 UK top 10 singles and 10 million singles sales around the world, before their split in early 2000. The trio reunited in 2005, when they participated in the ITV reality show Hit Me, Baby, One More Time and have performed live shows occasionally since.

In October 2012, it was announced that 911 would again reunite for The Big Reunion documentary on ITV2 in January 2013.

== Albums ==
=== Studio albums ===
List of studio albums, with selected details, chart positions and certifications
| Title | Details | Peak chart positions | | | | Certifications |
| Title | Details | UK | MAL | SCO | TWN | Certifications |
|---|---|---|---|---|---|---|
| The Journey | Released: 24 February 1997; Formats: CD, cassette; Label: Virgin | 13 | 1 | 1 | 6 | UK: Gold |
| Moving On | Released: 6 July 1998; Formats: CD, cassette; Label: Virgin | 10 | 1 | 8 | 2 | UK: Silver |
| There It Is | Released: 25 January 1999; Formats: CD, cassette; Label: Virgin | 8 | 8 | 8 | — | UK: Silver |
| Illuminate... (The Hits and More) | Released: 9 September 2013; Formats: CD, digital download; Label: WeeJ | 162 | — | — | — | |
"—" denotes a recording that did not chart or was not released in that territory.

=== Compilation albums ===
List of compilation albums, with selected details, chart positions and certifications
| Title | Details | Peak chart positions | |
| Title | Details | UK | SCO |
|---|---|---|---|
| The Greatest Hits and a Little Bit More | Released: 25 October 1999; Formats: CD, cassette; Label: Virgin | 40 | 31 |
"—" denotes a recording that did not chart or was not released in that territory.

=== Video albums ===
List of video albums, with selected details
| Title | Details |
|---|---|
| Night to Remember | Release: 2 February 1996; Formats: VHS; Label: Virgin |
| The Journey So Far | Release: 20 November 1997; Formats: VHS, VCD; Label: Virgin |

== Extended plays ==
List of extended plays, with selected details
| Title | Details |
|---|---|
| '99 EP | Released: 20 May 1999 (TW); Format: CD, digital download; Label: Innocent |

== Singles ==
=== As lead artist ===
List of singles, with selected chart positions and certifications
| Title | Year | Peak chart positions | | | | | | | | Certifications | Album |
| Title | Year | UK | AUS | FRA | GER | IRE | NZ | SCO | VIE | Certifications | Album |
|---|---|---|---|---|---|---|---|---|---|---|---|
| "A Night to Remember" | 1996 | 38 | — | — | — | — | — | 9 | — | | The Journey |
| "Love Sensation" | 1996 | 21 | — | — | — | — | — | 8 | — | | The Journey |
| "Don't Make Me Wait" | 1996 | 10 | 92 | — | 65 | — | — | 6 | — | | The Journey |
| "The Day We Find Love" | 1997 | 4 | — | — | — | — | — | 2 | — | | The Journey |
| "Bodyshakin'" | 1997 | 3 | 67 | — | — | — | 19 | 1 | — | UK: Silver | The Journey |
| "The Journey" | 1997 | 3 | — | — | — | — | — | 2 | — | | The Journey |
| "Party People...Friday Night" | 1997 | 5 | — | — | — | — | — | 5 | — | | Moving On |
| "All I Want Is You" | 1998 | 4 | 147 | — | — | — | 34 | 4 | — | | Moving On |
| "How Do You Want Me to Love You?" | 1998 | 10 | — | — | — | — | — | 4 | — | | Moving On |
| "More Than a Woman" | 1998 | 2 | 127 | 94 | — | — | 8 | 1 | — | | There It Is |
| "A Little Bit More" | 1999 | 1 | 116 | — | — | 7 | 46 | 1 | — | UK: Silver | There It Is |
| "Private Number" | 1999 | 3 | — | — | — | — | — | 2 | — | | There It Is |
| "Wonderland" | 1999 | 13 | — | — | — | — | — | 9 | — | | The Greatest Hits |
| "2 Hearts 1 Love" | 2013 | — | — | — | — | — | — | — | — | | Illuminate... |
| "I Do" | 2014 | — | — | — | — | — | — | — | — | | Illuminate... |
| "Em Đồng Ý (I Do)" (with Đức Phúc) | 2023 | — | — | — | — | — | — | — | 1 | | Non-album single |
"—" denotes a recording that did not chart or was not released in that territory.

=== As featured artist ===
List of singles, with selected chart positions
| Title | Year | Peak chart positions | | Album |
| Title | Year | UK | IRE | Album |
|---|---|---|---|---|
| "I Wish It Could Be Christmas Everyday" (among The Big Reunion cast) | 2013 | 21 | 82 | Non-album single |
"—" denotes a recording that did not chart or was not released in that territory.
