= Illuminate... (The Hits and More) =

Studio album / Compilation album by 911
- Released: 8 September 2013
- Recorded: 2013
- Studios: Central Sounds Studio, Glasgow, Scotland
- Genre: Pop
- Length: 50:26
- Label: WeeJ
- Producer: John McLaughlin

911 chronology
The Greatest Hits and a Little Bit More (2000)	Illuminate... (The Hits and More) (2013)

Singles from Illuminate: The Hits and More
- 1. "2 Hearts 1 Love" Released: 8 September 2013; 2. "I Do" Released: 10 February 2014

Illuminate... (The Hits and More) is the fourth studio album by the English boy band 911. It is their first album release since The Greatest Hits and a Little Bit More in 2000. Consisting of seven re-recorded hits and seven new tracks, it was released worldwide on 8 September 2013, the same day as its lead single "2 Hearts 1 Love". The album debuted at No. 162 on the UK Albums Chart.

== Track listing ==
No.	Title	Writer(s)	Producer(s)	Length
1.	"Bodyshakin'" (2013 version)	Gordon Goudie; John McLaughlin	David Thomas	3:33
2.	"Don't Make Me Wait" (2013 version)	Goudie; McLaughlin; Alan Rankine	Thomas	4:08
3.	"The Journey" (2013 version)	Lee Brennan; McLaughlin	Thomas	4:30
4.	"More Than a Woman" (2013 version)	Barry Gibb; Maurice Gibb; Robin Gibb	Thomas	3:21
5.	"The Day We Find Love" (2013 version)	Helen Boulding; Eliot Kennedy	Thomas	3:15
6.	"Love Sensation" (2013 version)	Goudie; McLaughlin	Thomas	3:45
7.	"A Little Bit More" (2013 version)	Bobby Gosh	Thomas	2:42
8.	"2 Hearts 1 Love"	Brennan; Jimmy Constable; Natalie DeLucia; Jud Mahoney; McLaughlin; Thomas	Mahoney; McLaughlin	3:33
9.	"Diamonds"	Brennan; Constable; Mahoney; McLaughlin	Thomas	4:01
10.	"I Do"	Brennan; Constable; DeLucia; Mahoney; McLaughlin	Mahoney; McLaughlin	3:27
11.	"In Another Life"	Brennan; Constable; DeLucia; Mahoney; McLaughlin	Mahoney; McLaughlin	2:37
12.	"Light Me Up"	Brennan; Andrew Murray	Mahoney; Murray	3:49
13.	"Alive"	Brennan; Constable; DeLucia; Mahoney; McLaughlin	Mahoney; McLaughlin	3:42
14.	"Illuminate"	Brennan; Constable; DeLucia; Mahoney; McLaughlin	Mahoney; McLaughlin	3:54

== Charts ==
Chart (2013)	Peak position
UK Albums (OCC)	162

== Release history ==
Country	Date	Format(s)	Label
Australia	8 September 2013	digital download	WeeJ Records
Canada	8 September 2013	digital download	WeeJ Records
Ireland	8 September 2013	digital download	WeeJ Records
New Zealand	8 September 2013	digital download	WeeJ Records
United Kingdom	8 September 2013	digital download	WeeJ Records
United States	8 September 2013	digital download	WeeJ Records
