= Party People...Friday Night =

1997 single by 911

Single by 911

from the album Moving On
- Released: 20 October 1997
- Length: 4:10
- Label: Ginga; Virgin; Brilliant!
- Songwriters: Jimmy Constable; Lee Brennan; Spike Dawbarn; John McLaughlin; Eliot Kennedy; Tim Lever; Mike Percy
- Producers: Eliot Kennedy; Tim Lever; Mike Percy

911 singles chronology
"The Journey" (1997)	"Party People...Friday Night" (1997)	"All I Want Is You" (1998)

"Party People...Friday Night" is a song by English boy band 911. It was released through Virgin Records in 1997 as the lead single from their second studio album, Moving On (1998). The song reached number five on the UK Singles Chart, becoming their fifth consecutive UK top-10 hit.

== Critical reception ==
British magazine Music Week rated "Party People...Friday Night" four out of five, adding, "The petite trio's party anthem creates all the right vibes. This will cement their status among the boy band elite."

== Charts ==
=== Weekly charts ===
Chart (1997)	Peak position
Europe (Eurochart Hot 100)	39
Scotland Singles (OCC)	5
UK Singles (OCC)	5
UK Airplay (Music Week)	25

=== Year-end charts ===
Chart (1997)	Position
UK Singles (OCC)	143
