= The Big Reunion series 1 =

First season of British reality-documentary TV series

The Big Reunion
- Season 1
- No. of episodes: 9

Release
- Original network: ITV2
- Original release: 31 January – 28 March 2013

Series chronology
- Next → Series 2

The first series of the British reality-documentary series The Big Reunion began airing on ITV2 on 31 January 2013 until 28 March 2013. The show features chart-topping bands who were big names in the UK pop music scene between the 1990s and early 2000s, and the programme follows them as they reunite for the first time in a decade and go through their two weeks of intensive rehearsals before finally stepping back on stage for a comeback performance. The bands who reunited for the first series were Five, 911, Atomic Kitten, B*Witched, Honeyz and Liberty X. Blue also joined later on.

The Big Reunion proved to be an unexpected hit for ITV2, achieving both ratings and critical success. The first episode brought in 1.2 million viewers, becoming the channel's highest rated premiere in five years, and the show went on to achieve over 1 million viewers every week, making it one of the channel's most popular shows. Additionally, tickets for the bands' comeback went on sale shortly after the end of the premiere episode and sold out in under five minutes. Due to this, the producers of the show decided to announce a full UK arena tour. The tour took place in May 2013 and, along with other behind-the-scenes action, was broadcast on ITV2 from 5–19 September as The Big Reunion: On Tour. Also, a Christmas special called The Big Christmas Reunion aired on 12 December 2013. It featured the bands recording a Christmas charity single for Text Santa and looking at how Text Santa helps vulnerable people.

== Production ==
=== Conception ===
On 18 October 2012, it was announced that pop groups Five, 911, Atomic Kitten, B*Witched, Honeyz and Liberty X—who were big names in the UK pop music scene in the 1990s and early 2000s—would be reuniting for an ITV2 documentary series entitled The Big Reunion, followed by a comeback performance at some point in 2013.

=== Personnel ===
The programme was ordered by Angela Jain, ITV's Director of Digital Channels, and Katy Thorogood, ITV's factual and daytime commissioner. ITV Studios' Kevin Lane acted as series producer, while creative director Michael Kelpie and Phil Mount acted as executive producers. Kelpie said: "To reunite these bands, tell the stories of what has happened to them since their heyday and follow them as they prepare to step back on the stage for the first time in a decade is a dream come true." Jain added, "We are thrilled to bring the stories of these pop groups up to date...A lot has happened in the time these bands have been apart - marriages, divorces and changes in careers - and who knows quite what will happen when they reunite!"

During rehearsals for the comeback performance and arena tour, Paul Domaine acted as the bands' choreographer, while Yvie Burnett, who has worked on shows like The X Factor and The Voice UK, acted as their vocal coach.

== Series overview ==
=== The Big Reunion ===
Filming for the show began in October 2012, with the members of each band telling their individual stories about their bandmates and displaying their own personal lives nowadays, and later meeting together again for the first time in several years. Whilst all the other bands reunited several weeks before rehearsals began, Liberty X did not reunite until the night before, due to Michelle Heaton undergoing a double mastectomy. The rehearsals for the comeback performance took place at the Lilian Baylis Studio in London, beginning on 7 January 2013 and continuing for two weeks. Atomic Kitten's Kerry Katona was the last to arrive for rehearsals due to her being on This Morning talking about Dancing on Ice. The comeback performance took place at the Hammersmith Apollo on 26 February, and was broadcast on ITV2 on 28 March.

Atomic Kitten's three founding members, Katona, Liz McClarnon and Natasha Hamilton, took part in the show, even though it had previously been reported that their comeback was in doubt due to a fight between Katona and former member Jenny Frost, who replaced Katona when she initially left the group in 2001. Frost was unable to take part in the show due to her pregnancy. Honeyz's reformation came in the form of a third different line-up that consisted of founding members Célena Cherry and Heavenli Denton, and Mariama Goodman, who replaced Denton when she initially left the group in 1999, and vice versa when Goodman herself departed in 2000. Original member Naima Belkhiati decided not to take part in the reunion, so Cherry called up Goodman as her replacement. Additionally, Five only reunited as a four-piece as founding member Jason "J" Brown, who had attended previous meetings for the show, backed out at the last minute after claiming that he no longer wanted to be in the public eye. During filming for the show, the remaining four members, Abz Love, Sean Conlon, Ritchie Neville and Scott Robinson, discussed the possibility of auditioning a new fifth member. After they put out a notice, three people auditioned to join the band – ex-Northern Line member Dan Corsi, model and singer Luke Boyden, and Nathan Rawlings, who made it to judges' houses on The X Factor in 2010 as part of boy band The Reason 4. However all auditionees were unsuccessful. As a result, Five continued on with just the four of them.

The first three episodes featured Five, Liberty X, Atomic Kitten, 911, Honeyz and B*Witched telling their backstories of their time in their respective groups and about their lives since splitting up. The next two episodes featured the groups reuniting for the first time in a decade and discussing how they felt about performing again. The next three episodes were concerned with rehearsals for the comeback gig, midway through which Blue joined the show and told their stories as well. The final episode featured the sold-out comeback gig and backstage action.

When asked why they chose to join the comeback gig, Blue said: "Phil Mount, The Big Reunion's producer, has always been a long time supporter of the band, giving us our first TV break, he really wanted us to be surprise special guests announced halfway through the series and to perform on the Hammersmith Apollo show. This sounded like a lot of fun, giving us the perfect chance to perform together again in the UK for our fans and reconnect with the other acts, many of whom friends of ours and started out around the same time as us. For us the 'Big Reunion' is a great chance for all of us bands to come together for one BIG party on Tuesday night!" Reaction to Blue joining The Big Reunion was initially negative among the other groups, as well as fans of the show, due to the fact that, unlike them, Blue were not reuniting, having already been back together since 2011 and represented the United Kingdom in the Eurovision Song Contest 2011.

=== The Big Reunion: On Tour and The Big Christmas Reunion ===
A three-week mini-series called The Big Reunion: On Tour aired in September 2013, featuring the bands as they embarked on their arena tour. Founding Five member Jason "J" Brown also returned to hit back at accusations made by his bandmates.

On 12 December 2013, a Christmas special called The Big Christmas Reunion aired. It featured the bands uniting to recording a cover of "I Wish It Could Be Christmas Everyday" for Text Santa. It gave an insight into the work undertaken by Text Santa charities Age UK, Barnardo's, BeatBullying, the British Heart Foundation, CLIC Sargent and Help the Hospices.

== Bands ==
- Five (without Jason "J" Brown)
- 911
- Atomic Kitten (original line-up)
- B*Witched
- Honeyz (Célena Cherry and Heavenli Denton from original line-up, Mariama Goodman from second line-up)
- Liberty X
- Blue (joined later during episode 7 and performed at some of the concerts)

== Episodes ==
=== The Big Reunion ===
No. in season	Title	Featured band(s)	Directed by	Written by	UK viewers	Original release date
1	"Five & Liberty X"	Five & Liberty X	Shane Byrne; Mark Drake	Shane Byrne; Mark Drake	1,137,000	31 January 2013
Five reveal the tension and heartache within the band that stems from their career past, and how the band members came to be in a love-and-hate situation following the behaviour of two of them, which led to their success on the cusp of breaking America being cut short after being dropped by their record label. They also discuss the possibility of having to find a replacement for band member Jason "J" Brown, who has decided against returning for the reunion.; Liberty X discuss the highs and lows of being taken from a well-budgeted, high performing record label, Virgin Records, to a much smaller label with no money, no time and nothing that could prevent them from dropping off the radar completely. While free of tension in their camp, the band members are especially worried about Jessica Taylor, who is wary of returning to the spotlight following years away, and Michelle Heaton, who is preparing to have reconstructive surgery.
2	"Atomic Kitten & 911"	Atomic Kitten & 911	Shane Byrne; Mark Drake	Shane Byrne; Mark Drake	1,305,000	7 February 2013
Atomic Kitten delve into their shady past, as they reveal the secrets behind Kerry Katona's departure, and their struggle to maintain themselves after Natasha Hamilton's pregnancy left her with post-natal depression. They also admit that the claws were out from the very beginning, with Kerry and Liz McClarnon often ending up in full-scale fights. And with long-term member Jenny Frost not returning to the line-up, the band have to discuss the consequences of Kerry returning to the band.; 911 reveal a dark past of drink, drugs and serial sex in their candid interview, and for the first time, admit that their departure from the pop scene was due to their own actions, rather than those of a disgruntled record company. They reveal how Jimmy Constable turned up for live television drunk, how Spike Dawbarn nearly ended up having a breakdown due to Jimmy's behaviour, and Lee Brennan having to face the idea of seeing his ex-wife, B*Witched's Lindsay Armaou, every day.
3	"B*Witched & Honeyz"	B*Witched & Honeyz	Shane Byrne; Mark Drake	Shane Byrne; Mark Drake	941,000	14 February 2013
B*Witched uncover the dark tale of the band's fall from grace, after the record company booted member Edele Lynch to the front, leaving the rest of the band in a very hard, tough situation. They also reveal the heartache behind trying to break America, the reality of being dropped from a major label, and the tough times that followed the years after the band. And for one of the band members, even talking about it soon proves to be a tough reminder of the years gone by.; Honeyz reveal the pressure behind a revolving door line-up, with Célena Cherry the only member to stand tough through the band's constant change of time. Having to deal with Heavenli Denton's sudden departure, the arrival of new girl Mariama Goodman, and the reality that one member of the band couldn't even sing, left Célena in a very dark and regretful place. And now, with a line-up that consists of two members who have never worked together before, the pressure is even tougher.
4	"Five & Atomic Kitten"	Five & Atomic Kitten	Shane Byrne; Mark Drake	Shane Byrne; Mark Drake	826,000	21 February 2013
Five re-unite for the first time in ten years, and meet in a neutral location to discuss their trials, tribulations and animosity. It's clear from the start that Sean Conlon still holds feelings from his pop star days, as the four begin to bear their souls, tensions once again seem to boil to the surface. Will the boys be able to put their troubles away before rehearsals begin? And the search for a new band member to replace J begins, in earnest.; Atomic Kitten arrange to meet at Natasha's country resort, to be re-united with original band member Kerry twelve years after her departure. After initially struggling to be convinced at Kerry's commitment to the band, the trio soon realise that the bond between them is still there, and before they are able to take time for it to all sink in, they are immediately put into the public eye after being papped on the way to their first band photoshoot in eight years.
5	"911 & B*Witched"	911 & B*Witched	Shane Byrne; Mark Drake	Shane Byrne; Mark Drake	766,000	28 February 2013
911 meet for the first time in ten years, and in a no-holds barred conversation, reminisce about their womanising antics, as well as sharing their darkest secrets - including Lee's secret heartbreak, and Jimmy's addiction to a deadly cocktail of drink and drugs. Spike is unable to comprehend the extent of Jimmy's inability to live without the bubble of the band, but the question on everybody's mind is, will they be able to close old wounds in time for rehearsals?; B*Witched's painful truths are exposed from the moment they meet, and with emotions still running high after ten years apart, a rift between the band and Edele threatens to split the band before rehearsals even start. Years of resentment appear to still be rife within the band, as Lindsay, Sinéad and Keavy find their voices for the first time, and argue their grievances from their early days in the band. But will they be able to find a way forward after such a tense meeting?; Five decided to head out on a pub crawl to mark Ritchie's last night in town before heading back to Australia. As they hit the bars of Soho, the burning question of finding a replacement for missing band member J is still hanging over their heads. And with tensions once again threatening to rear their ugly head, Scott Robinson wonders whether it was a good idea after all to re-unite the band after eleven years away from the industry.; Liberty X are forced to accept the idea that Michelle may not be fit in time for rehearsals, after undergoing reconstructive surgery. Her mum is not convinced that she should be taking part in the reunion, but Michelle is determined to go ahead with rehearsals at all costs. But is her strength enough to pull her through? Band member Tony Lundon ponders the possibility of life in Liberty X once again, especially with his wife on the verge of giving birth to twins.
6	"First Week Rehearsals"	All bands	Shane Byrne; Mark Drake	Shane Byrne; Mark Drake	778,000	7 March 2013
Liberty X meet up for the first time in six years, and arrange to go out for a round of drinks. While it's clear that the band are in the best possible position of all six bands, the burning question of Michelle's surgery is a topic which none of the band members are frightened to discuss. It's clear the band have an advantage in the sense of underlying tension, but is their commitment to the band enough to pull them through to rehearsals without any hiccups in the process?; The six bands come together for the first time as the first week of rehearsals get underway. Atomic Kitten are forced to deal with the fact that Kerry is having to play catch up, Honeyz begin work on forming their all-new line up, B*Witched tackle their old dance routines, Liberty X take out the "Just a Little" PVC for the first time in years, and 911 have trouble tackling the strict gymnastic dance routine to their hit single "Bodyshakin'".; Five continue their search for a replacement for missing band member J. As they audition further applicants, the ugly temper of band member Sean once again boils to the surface. And when it comes to the dance routines for some of the band's biggest hits, Sean isn't happy either. Having to re-work the routines and vocals to suit the remaining members of the band proves a difficult task, and once again tests the bonds of Five to the ultimate limit.; The six bands perform in front of each other for the first time, after starting to realise that it's not just a matter of polishing up old harmonies and dusting off routines from the height of their fame. Atomic Kitten impress with their rendition of classic "Whole Again", Five wow the entire audience with some of their classic hits, B*Witched reveal their talent for the Irish riverdance, and 911 show off their impressive dance routines.
7	"Blue & Second Week Rehearsals"	All bands	Shane Byrne; Mark Drake	Shane Byrne; Mark Drake	911,000	14 March 2013
Blue reveal the truths and dark secrets behind their five-year career after being added to the bill at the last minute. Duncan reveals that the band were on the brink of splitting after Lee Ryan's comments about the September 11 attacks, Simon discusses the wild party lifestyle, including jamming with Britney Spears, and Antony Costa reveals the path to ending up in one of Britain's most successful boybands of the 21st century. But the story is not as clear-cut as everybody expects.; The six bands are not happy about Blue's addition to the bill, with Edele of B*Witched and Spike of 911 being most critical of the band's appearance. But as Blue attempt to win round the less than happy faces, everyone is forced to come to terms with the new additions, and attempt to face the reality that they have to up their game to keep in tow with one of Britain's most super-stellar pop acts. Tensions are heightened, while everyone comes to terms with the new boys of the family.; The six bands continue rehearsals for the concert. Kerry of Atomic Kitten breaks down in vocal rehearsal after criticism from her band mates, Lee of 911 and Lindsay of B*Witched sit and have a face-to-face conversation for the first time since their divorce, Sinéad struggles to cope with life away from her children, Jimmy and Spike of 911 are unimpressed when Lee turns up late to rehearsals twice, with a hangover, Five are unimpressed when Scott fails to make a crucial music edit properly, and Célena worries about her weight when Honeyz dust off their old outfits. While Mariama looks fantastic, Célena can't even fit into her old dress.
8	"Blue & Final Rehearsals"	All bands	Shane Byrne; Mark Drake	Shane Byrne; Mark Drake	811,000	21 March 2013
Blue continue revealing their complicated past, as Simon takes through life after the band, Antony discusses his financial ruin, Duncan James reveals the truth about his revelation of being bisexual, and Lee discusses the trials and tough times linked to his failed solo career. With the concert just around the corner, Blue continue with rehearsals, but the pressure is mounting - will they be able to catch up to the pace of the other six bands in time for the concert?; Liberty X are a man down after Tony is forced to leave rehearsals and attend to his wife, who has gone into premature labour with twins. Just three days away from the concert, the band contemplate the possibility that Tony won't be back in time to perform. As the pressure begins to mount, the band wonder if the show will go on, and if after so many years away from the spotlight, that the reunion is this a step too far in terms of ambition and ability to pull the show off without a hitch.; Five are left in turmoil again after Sean suffers a second breakdown after getting a blast from the past. After all of the heartache he has been through to reach this point in time, the band wonder if they soon be a trio, or if Sean can battle his demons and find a way through to his better days. As vocal coach Yvie Burnett gives the band some wise words of advice, Abz Love begins to wonder if the band really are strong enough to keep the momentum going to perform at the concert.
9	"The Big Reunion Goes Live"	All bands	Shane Byrne; Mark Drake	Shane Byrne; Mark Drake	1,152,000	28 March 2013
After baring their souls, resolving issues, and finally reuniting, the day of reckoning arrives for the seven groups. It's time to hit the stage again for the first time in a decade for the biggest gig of their lives. The last episode of the series follows the bands in the build up to the big night and one by one they step on stage at the Hammersmith Apollo in front of 4,000 screaming fans. It accesses all areas on a rollercoaster ride of two hours of drama and jam-packed emotion.

=== The Big Reunion: On Tour ===
No. in season	Title	Featured band(s)	Directed by	Written by	UK viewers	Original release date
1	"Final Rehearsals"	All bands	Shane Byrne; Mark Drake	Shane Byrne; Mark Drake	197,000	5 September 2013
Founding Five member Jason "J" Brown returns to hit back at accusations made by his bandmates. He acknowledges his behaviour could have been seen as loud and overbearing, but he denies bullying Sean Conlon. During a meet with Abz Love, Brown explains he has moved on and that he does not feel comfortable returning to Five.
2	"Trouble Backstage"	All bands	Shane Byrne; Mark Drake	Shane Byrne; Mark Drake	191,000	12 September 2013
As The Big Reunion Arena tour kicks off in Sheffield, problems occur backstage, from missing costumes, missing music, arguments to onstage injuries. Even more problems occur while on their way up to Scotland, the tour bus breaks down. Will the bands make it on time to perform in Glasgow? Meanwhile Liberty X announce that they will no longer return to music after The Big Reunion tour ends and Atomic Kitten perform in their hometown, Liverpool.
3	"Final Shows"	All bands	Shane Byrne; Mark Drake	Shane Byrne; Mark Drake	231,000	19 September 2013
It's almost the end of the line for the bands as they hit the half way mark on their 14-date UK tour, and they're enjoying every single night before it's over. Our cameras continue to follow Five, Blue, B*Witched, Liberty X, 911, Honeyz and Atomic Kitten as they burn the candle at both ends. This episode sees bedroom shenanigans, busking on the street, die-hard fans, and a couple of band members reveal a little more than they intended. As the tour reaches its final days, the bands reflect on what their reunions have meant for them, and what the future holds.

=== The Big Christmas Reunion ===
No. in season	Title	Featured band(s)	Directed by	Written by	UK viewers	Original release date
1	"The Big Christmas Reunion"	All bands	Shane Byrne; Mark Drake	Shane Byrne; Mark Drake	N/A	12 December 2013
Ten years after their music dominated the airways, and after a phenomenal comeback year, the bands from ITV2's hit series The Big Reunion are back in the recording studio – producing a Christmas single in aid of Text Santa.; The Big Christmas Reunion gives viewers an access-all-areas pass to witness what happens behind the scenes when – for the first time ever - Blue, Atomic Kitten, Five, Honeyz, B*Witched, 911 and Liberty X join forces to record music together. They will be recording one of the best-loved tracks in Christmas history – "I Wish It Could Be Christmas Every Day" by Wizzard. With just two days to record a Christmas hit, the cameras will capture all the drama, excitement, rivalry and pressure as 26 pop stars come together to work with legendary music producer Cutfather – who has over seven UK number ones and 37 top 10 singles to his name. It may be one of the most recognisable Christmas singles but Five are convinced a rap by their very own Abz Love should be included - but will the other bands agree? Only one star can be given the honour of singing the iconic final line – but who has the voice and nerve to take on such a vocal? And much has changed since they were last recording pop stars – Kerry Katona of Atomic Kitten and Michelle Heaton of Liberty X are both pregnant and Michelle has to take time out from the recording studio to go for a scan that will reveal the sex of her baby.; Text Santa is ITV's annual charity fundraiser and this year is raising money for six UK based charities – Age UK, Barnardo's, BeatBullying, the British Heart Foundation, CLIC Sargent and Help the Hospices. Each band gets to see the incredible work undertaken by each of these charities – and in some cases are asked to help out. Five are forced to learn a totally different type of dance routine when they are guests of honour at an Age UK Tea Dance. While the girls from B*Witched and guys of 911 battle it out through the muddiest, wettest obstacle courses in support of the British Heart Foundation. In Wakefield, Atomic Kitten help Barnardo's host a children's Christmas party for young families who would otherwise struggle to afford any kind of festive cheer. A visitor to the studio is 21-year-old Ellie who is given a tour of the studio by the Honeyz after she tells them of her harrowing experiences of cyber bullying – and the support she received from BeatBullying. Blue make a surprise visit to Amanda – a fan who is a patient at Teesside Hospice, a member of Help the Hospices. Amanda is invited for a VIP visit to one of their arena concerts. In the studio, Michelle Heaton and Lee Brennan receive a very special visitor when 11-year-old Alayna arrives to tell them how invaluable CLIC Sargent were while she was undergoing treatment for cancer. This plucky girl has a profound effect on the two singers – reminding Lee of a similar experience as a child.; For all the bands, the chance to see how Text Santa funding helps these charities puts the entire recording experience in perspective.

== Reception ==
=== Critical reception ===
After watching the first episode, which focused on the rises and falls of Five and Liberty X, Adam Postans of MSN said: "I'll be honest; I tuned in to this series opener to take the merciless mickey out of a bunch of pop has-been wannabes (come to think of it, 'Has-Been Wannabes' would have been a brilliant name for the losing quintet on the original ITV talent show, Popstars)...So I'm delighted and surprised to say that The Big Reunion wasn't the tiresome, drawn-out hour I'd assumed it would be..." Postans called it: "A surprisingly sober tale of the downfalls of being a pop star."

Of the second episode, which focused on the rises and falls of Atomic Kitten and 911, Caroline Frost of The Huffington Post said: "This week's 'The Big Reunion', bringing back together six girl-and boy bands for a one-off concert, concentrated on 911 and Atomic Kitten, which meant one thing - Kerry Katona-watch - but also a couple of harsh life lessons...This week's lessons - fame won't mend a broken heart, and success will challenge your friendships however robust they are, and turn the sweetest kitten into a clawing puss. And I still can't wait for Bew*tched to unravel their demons. Roll on next week of this car-crash guilty pleasure. Loving every minute."

Of the third episode, which focused on the rises and falls of B*Witched and Honeyz, Frost said: "This week's 'Big Reunion' showed the strength – AND shortfalls – of girl power, and shared two more of life's harsh lessons along the way."

Grace Dent, writing for The Independent, reviewed The Big Reunion very positively: "Sometime back in January a small TV brain-fart named The Big Reunion appeared on the schedule. Real low-rent reality TV fodder. The sort of thing I lap up at home with my ankles raised, eating noodles, while you are possibly ironing your own face to stay alert during that new Poliakoff five-parter. I won, however, and hooray for me, because The Big Reunion has been bloody fantastic." Dent went on to state that, "I am truly thankful that we live in an era when washed-up stars can make TV comebacks." Rosie Gizauskas from NOW magazine said that Five were the most "fascinating" band on the show.

=== Ratings ===
The first episode was seen by an average of 957,000 UK viewers, though it peaked at 1.2 million, making it ITV2's highest rated new show since Bionic Woman in 2008. The ratings increased for the second episode, which was watched by over 1.3 million, helping ITV2 finish third in the 9:00pm slot in front of BBC Two, Channel 4 and Channel 5. The overnight audience fell sharply to 670,000 for the third episode (but official figures were 941,000), being beaten in its timeslot by Junior Doctors: Your Life in Their Hands on BBC Three. Ratings continued to slide for episode 4, which overnight viewing figures showed was only watched by 630,000 viewers (less than half the audience of the episode of Celebrity Juice) that followed at 10:00pm, although the official rating was 826,000. The sixth episode brought in 606,000 viewers when up against the series finale of Mayday on BBC One and UEFA Europa League coverage on ITV. 638,000 watched episode 7 and 593,000 watched episode 8. The ratings shot back up for the final episode, as an audience of 974,000 tuned in to watch the highlights and behind-the-scenes action of the Hammersmith Apollo concert. Official ratings show that with the addition of ITV2+1, The Big Reunion averaged over 1 million viewers every week.

Summary of The Big Reunion ratings
Episode no.	Title	Date	Official ITV2 rating	ITV2 weekly rank	Share (%)	Official ITV2 +1 rating	Total ITV2 viewers
1	"Five & Liberty X"	31 January 2013	1,137,000	2	5.2	361,000	1,498,000
2	"Atomic Kitten & 911"	7 February 2013	1,305,000	1	4.9	260,000	1,525,000
3	"B*Witched & Honeyz"	14 February 2013	941,000	3	3.0	254,000	1,195,000
4	"Five & Atomic Kitten"	21 February 2013	826,000	3	3.4	209,000	1,035,000
5	"911 & B*Witched"	28 February 2013	766,000	7	2.6	173,000	943,000
6	"First Week Rehearsals"	7 March 2013	778,000	4	2.6	219,000	997,000
7	"Blue & Second Week Rehearsals"	14 March 2013	911,000	4	2.8	206,000	1,117,000
8	"Blue & Final Rehearsals"	21 March 2013	811,000	7	2.7	259,000	1,070,000
9	"The Big Reunion Goes Live"	28 March 2013	1,152,000	5	6.7	350,000	1,502,000
Series average			959,000	4	3.9	255,000	1,210,000
