= Take It All =

Take It All may refer to:

- "Take It All" (song), a song from the 2009 film Nine performed by Marion Cotillard
- "Take It All", a song by Pop Evil from Up
- Take It All (game show), an NBC game show hosted by Howie Mandel
- "Take It All", a song by Adele from 21
- "Take It All", a song by Badfinger from Straight Up
- "Take It All", a 2006 song by Hillsong United from United We Stand
- "Take It All", a song by The Reason 4
- "Take It All", a song by Trust Company from The Lonely Position of Neutral
- Passion: Take It All, a live album by Passion Conferences
- Take It All, an English title of the 1963 film À tout prendre

== See also ==
- Take It All Away, an album by Ryan Cabrera
- "The Winner Takes It All", a song by ABBA
- "Take It All Away", a song by Owl City from Shooting Star (EP)
