= CRFM =

English radio station

CRFM Carlisle
- Carlisle; United Kingdom
- Broadcast area: Carlisle and Cumbria
- Frequency: 102.7 MHz
- RDS: CRFM

Programming
- Language: English

History
- First air date: 15 April 2024

Links
- Website: www.yourcrfm.co.uk

CRFM is a community radio station based in Carlisle, Cumbria, England. It broadcasts on FM and online. The station operates on a not-for-profit basis and broadcasts local news, community information and music programming.

== History ==
CRFM officially launched on April 15 2024 from the Carlisle Enterprise Centre, following a development period affected by the COVID-19 pandemic and difficulties securing transmitter sites. Its first song was Starship's "Nothing's Gonna Stop Us Now", played by presenter Ken White.

The station's Carlisle studios were named after broadcaster and radio executive John Myers.

Darrell Thomas, was involved in establishing CRFM and serves as its managing director.

In 2025, CRFM expanded in west Cumbria, establishing additional studios in Workington.

== Programming and presenters ==
CRFM broadcasts music, local news and community programming. Its presenters have included former BBC Radio Cumbria broadcasters Val Armstrong, Joe Costin and Paul Braithwaite, as well as former CFM presenters Pete Moss and Bekah Fowler.

Singer Lee Brennan, a member of the pop group 911, joined the station's presenting line-up in 2024.
