= Joyful Noise =

Joyful Noise or A Joyful Noise may refer to:

== Named works ==
- A Joyful Noise, a 1966 musical with a book by Edward Padula and music and lyrics by Oscar Brand and Paul Nassau
- Joyful Noise: Poems for Two Voices, a 1989 children's book by Paul Fleischman
- Joyful Noise Recordings, an independent record label founded in Indiana in 2003
- Joyful Noise (album), a 2002 album by The Derek Trucks Band
- A Joyful Noise (Jo Dee Messina album), a 2002 Christmas album by Jo Dee Messina
- Joyful Noise (film), a music-driven 2012 film by Todd Graff, starring Queen Latifah and Dolly Parton
- A Joyful Noise (Gossip album), a 2012 album by the dance-punk band Gossip
- A Joyful Noise (Drinkard Singers album), 1958
- "Joyful Noise", a 2008 song by Flame (rapper)
- see Robert Tilton, Joyful Noise is one of the many names listed for the satire flatulence parody videos involving his prosperity gospel sermons
- Joyful Noise (chorus), a singing ensemble for people with disabilities, founded in 2000
