= The Journey (911 song) =

1997 single by 911

Single by 911

from the album The Journey
- Released: 30 June 1997
- Length: 4:47
- Label: Ginga; Virgin; Brilliant!
- Songwriters: John McLaughlin; Lee Brennan
- Producers: Eliot Kennedy; Tim Lever; Mike Percy

911 singles chronology
"Bodyshakin'" (1997)	"The Journey" (1997)	"Party People...Friday Night" (1997)

Alternative cover
- Cover of the UK CD2

"The Journey'" is a song by English boy band 911. It was released on 30 June 1997 in the United Kingdom through Virgin Records as the sixth and final single from their debut studio album, The Journey (1997). It peaked at number three on the UK Singles Chart and remained on the chart for seven weeks.

== Critical reception ==
British magazine Music Week rated "The Journey" five out of five, picking it as Single of the Week. They added, "The title track from the Top 10 album has been given a fresh, choir-enhanced, lushly orchestrated treatment and now sounds strong enough to give the teen sensations their first chart topper."

== Track listings ==
- UK CD1
1. "The Journey" (radio edit)
2. "The Journey" (extended mix)
3. "The Journey" (album version)
4. "Don't Make Me Wait" (live)
- UK CD2
1. "The Journey" (radio edit)
2. "The Journey" (Organic mix)
3. "The Journey" (instrumental)
4. "The Day We Find Love" (live)
- UK cassette single
1. "The Journey" (radio edit)
2. "The Journey" (instrumental)
3. "Don't Make Me Wait" (live)

== Charts ==
=== Weekly charts ===
Chart (1997)	Peak position
Europe (Eurochart Hot 100)	39
Scotland Singles (OCC)	2
UK Singles (OCC)	3
UK Airplay (Music Week)	30

=== Year-end charts ===
Chart (1997)	Position
UK Singles (OCC)	117
