= Love Sensation (disambiguation) =

"Love Sensation" is a 1980 song by Loleatta Holloway, later covered by multiple artists.

Love Sensation may also refer to:

- Love Sensation (album), the album of which the song is from
- "Love Sensation" (911 song), 1996
- "Love Sensation" (Madonna song), 2026
- "Love Sensation", a 1989 song by Accept from Eat the Heat
