= 2 Hearts 1 Love =

Single by 911

from the album Illuminate... (The Hits and More)
- Released: 8 September 2013
- Recorded: 2013
- Studio: Central Sounds Studio (Glasgow, Scotland)
- Genre: Pop
- Length: 3:33
- Label: WeeJ
- Songwriters: Lee Brennan; Jimmy Constable; Natalie DeLucia; Jud Mahoney; John McLaughlin; David Thomas
- Producers: Jud Mahoney; John McLaughlin

911 singles chronology
"Wonderland" (1999)	"2 Hearts 1 Love" (2013)	"I Wish It Could Be Christmas Everyday" (2013)

"2 Hearts 1 Love" is a song by English boy band 911. It was their first single release since "Wonderland" in 1999. The song was released on 8 September 2013 as the lead single from the album Illuminate... (The Hits and More), which was also released on the same date. The song was written by group members Lee Brennan and Jimmy Constable alongside Natalie DeLucia, David Thomas and the song's producers Jud Mahoney and John McLaughlin.

== Live performances ==
911 first performed the song at Big Summer Sessions in Swindon on 27 July 2013. They also performed it on Big Brother's Bit on the Side on 4 August 2013 and on This Morning the following day.
