= All I Want Is You (911 song) =

1998 single by 911

Single by 911

from the album Moving On
- B-side: "Let's Go Crazy" (live); "I Believe I Can Fly" (live)
- Released: 23 March 1998
- Length: 4:10
- Label: Ginga; Virgin
- Songwriters: Lee Brennan; John McLaughlin
- Producer: Johnny Douglas

911 singles chronology
| "Party People...Friday Night" (1997) | "All I Want Is You" (1998) | "How Do You Want Me to Love You?" (1998) |

"All I Want Is You" is a song by English boy band 911. It was released through Ginga and Virgin Records on 23 March 1998 as the second single from their second studio album, Moving On (1998), and peaked at number four on the UK Singles Chart. It was 911's second song to chart in New Zealand, where it reached number 34.

== Critical reception ==
A reviewer from Music Week declared the song as a "simple but effective mid-tempo schmaltzy number [that] has Bee Gees-like harmonies and ventures into the same sort of AOR/soul lite territory as The Lighthouse Family." The magazine's Alan Jones wrote, "911 deliver their slickest single yet with "All I Want Is You", whose glossy sheen and overall feel attempt to emulate the even more successful Backstreet Boys. It's not as strong a song as the last few Backstreet Boys releases, though the group's fervent fans — about to be whipped into a new frenzy by a 911 tour — will doubtless make this an instant Top 10 smash."

== Track listings ==
- UK CD1 and Australian CD single
1. "All I Want Is You" (radio edit) – 3:50
2. "Let's Go Crazy" (live) – 3:48
3. "All I Want Is You" (acoustic version) – 4:02
- UK CD2
1. "All I Want Is You" (radio edit) – 3:50
2. "I Believe I Can Fly" (live) – 4:28
3. "All I Want Is You" (Peppermint edit) – 3:23
- UK cassette single
1. "All I Want Is You" (radio edit) – 3:50
2. "Let's Go Crazy" (live) – 3:48
3. "All I Want Is You" (Peppermint extended mix) – 6:31
- European CD single
1. "All I Want Is You" (radio edit) – 3:50
2. "Let's Go Crazy" (live) – 3:48

== Charts ==
=== Weekly charts ===
| Chart (1998) | Peak position |
|---|---|
| Australia (ARIA) | 147 |
| Europe (Eurochart Hot 100) | 25 |
| New Zealand (Recorded Music NZ) | 34 |
| Scotland Singles (OCC) | 4 |
| UK Singles (OCC) | 4 |
| UK Airplay (Music Week) | 20 |

=== Year-end charts ===
| Chart (1998) | Position |
|---|---|
| UK Singles (OCC) | 153 |
