= A Joyful Noise (Drinkard Singers album) =

Studio album by The Drinkard Singers
- Released: 1958, U.S.A. 2009 Re-issue, Australia
- Recorded: April 9, 14, 16 and 25, 1958
- Venue: Webster Hall, New York
- Genre: Gospel
- Length: 31:58
- Label: RCA
- Producer: Brad McCuen

A Joyful Noise is a live album by American gospel singing group The Drinkard Singers, released in the U.S. in 1958 on RCA Records. It is a live recording of gospel tunes performed by the family act which comprised Emily Drinkard (later known as Cissy Houston), her sisters Anne Moss, Lee Warrick (mother of Dionne Warwick and Dee Dee Warwick), and brothers Nickolas and Larry Drinkard and Marie Epps. Anne Drinkard left and was replaced by Lee's adopted daughter Judy Guions, who was later known as Judy Clay.

== Notes ==
After the Drinkard Singers appearance at the 1957 Newport Jazz Festival, they recorded the first gospel album to appear on a major label, which would become the live album, A Joyful Noise for RCA Records in 1958.

== Track listing ==
U.S. LP Album

A Side

1. "My Rock" - 2:39
2. "Use Me, Lord" - 2:45
3. "Rise, Shine" - 3:10
4. "One Day" - 3:06
5. "Listen to the Lambs" - 3:11
6. "After It's All Over" - 2:39

B Side

1. "Somebody Touched Me" - 2:49
2. "Wade in the Water" - 2:23
3. "Just a Little While to Stay Here" - 2:58
4. "Singing In My Soul" - 2:52
5. "Ring Those Golden Bells - 2:35
6. "Sweet Hour of Prayer" (William B. Bradbury, William W. Walford) - 3:11

== Personnel ==
- Ann Moss, Judy Clay, Larry Drinkard, Lee Warrick, Marie Epps, Emily Drinkard Garland - vocals
- Nicky Drinkard - vocals, piano
- Teddy Jones - bass (Track 2)
- Moe Harper - drums
- Dicky Mitchell - organ
- John Johnson Jr (tracks: A2, A4 to A6, B1, B2, B4, B5), Kelly Owens (tracks: A1, A3, B3, B6) - piano (uncredited)
- Unknown Artist (tracks: B1) - tambourine (uncredited)

Technical

- Brad McCuen - producer
- Ray Hall - engineer
- Murray Laden - photography
