= Boys in Black =

Australian musical group

- Also known as: BIB
- Origin: Sydney, New South Wales, Australia
- Genres: Soul, R&B
- Past members: Bob Bob; Ben Bob; Paul Bob; Jason Williams; DJ Sunny; Joseph Faaoloii

Boys in Black were an Australian five-piece vocal group which included three brothers Ben, Bob and Paul Bob. Their cover version of Bee Gees' song, "More Than a Woman" (1993), reached the top 50 on both New Zealand and Australian singles charts. All members had a Polynesian background. They performed the track on Australian TV's The Midday Show in April 1993. Their final single, "It's Alright", appeared in 1998.

== Members ==
- Bob Bob – vocals
- Ben Bob – vocals
- Paul Bob – vocals
- Jason Williams – vocals
- DJ Sunny – vocals
- Joseph Faaoloii – vocals (replaced Sunny)

== Discography ==
=== Singles ===
List of singles, with selected chart positions
Title	Year	Peak chart positions	
Title	Year	NZ	AUS
"More Than a Woman"	1993	43	39
"The Best Thing"	1993	—	—
"How Ya Doin'"	1996	—	—
"It's Alright"	1998	—	—
