= The Drinkard Singers =

American gospel singing group

- Genres: Gospel
- Years active: 1938–1962
- Label: RCA
- Past members: Emily "Cissy" Drinkard; Nick Drinkard; Larry Drinkard; Marie Drinkard-Epps; Anne Drinkard-Moss; Judy Clay

The Drinkard Singers were an American gospel singing group, most successful in the late 1950s, renowned for being the first gospel group to perform at Carnegie Hall and the Newport Jazz Festival and the first gospel group signed to a major record label, recording and releasing the album, A Joyful Noise, on RCA Records in 1958. The group would launch the careers of soul singers Cissy Houston and her adopted niece Judy Clay as well as mentor fellow soul singers Dionne Warwick and Dee Dee Warwick.

== Family origins ==
Nicholas (aka Nitch, 1896–1952) and Delia Mae Drinkard (née McCaskill; 1901–1942) had eight children - sons William (1918–2003), Hansom (1925–1986), Nicholas (1929–1992), and Larry (1931–2012), and daughters Lee (1920–2005), Marie (1922–2007), Anne (1927–2003) and Cissy (1933-2024). The Drinkard surname, although gained through a Native American ancestor, has British origins with a meaning that alludes to the running of water.

Nicholas Drinkard was born to Susan Bell Drinkard (née Fuller; b. 1876) and father John Drinkard Jr. (b. 1870), both of whom were African American. Through his mother, Nitch had part Dutch descent while his father John was reportedly part Indigenous American.

He was descended from a family of African-American landowners in Blakely, Georgia, where three of his eldest children (William, Lee and Marie) were born. The Drinkards owned a substantial amount of farmland during a time when it was unusual for blacks to own large portions of land. The asset was gradually depleted as small portions of the land were sold, over time, to resolve the continued legal troubles of a close relative.

The family moved to Newark, New Jersey during the Great Migration of the 1920s where their five younger children (Hansom, Anne, Nicholas Jr., Larry and Cissy) would be born. By the time of the births of the three youngest, the United States was in the throes of the Great Depression. In September 1938, mother Delia suffered a stroke and died of a cerebral hemorrhage in May 1941. Nitcholas died of stomach cancer in March 1952.

== Musical career ==
Nitch, who found work in a factory in nearby Elizabeth, was the driving force behind the Drinkard Singers. Following their mother Delia Mae's stroke, Nitch coaxed his four younger children Anne, Nicky, Larry and Cissy to sing sacred hymns to keep the family's spirits high. They performed all over churches in the New Jersey and New York areas, first under the name of the Drinkard Four and then as the Drinkard Jubiliars. Nitch's youngest child Cissy contended that the group wasn't professional at this time as Nitch wanted them to sing for the Lord. Throughout their youth, they would be taught how to sing in harmony and solos by their father and eldest sisters Lee and Marie. The group took music more seriously after their mother Delia Mae passed in 1941.

By the dawn of the 1950s, with jubilee singing going out of style and gospel music hitting its "golden age" with singers such as Sister Rosetta Tharpe, Mahalia Jackson and Clara Ward, the group soon grew to include Lee and Marie, this led to the group being renamed the Drinkard Singers, with Lee now serving as manager.

In October 1951, radio announcer Joe Bostic convinced the original sextet to open for Ward and Jackson as among the first gospel acts to perform at Carnegie Hall in Manhattan under the "Negro Gospel and Religious Music Festival" program. Shortly after that, the group made their professional radio singing debut on Bostic's Gospel Train Sunday morning radio program in January 1952. Not too long after these accomplishments, however, their father discovered he had stomach cancer. By the time of the official diagnosis, it had already metastasized all over his body and he died that March. The group temporarily went on hiatus following his death and left their old church at St. Luke's A.M.E. Church where they had been raised as Methodist Episcopalian following the departure of their minister Rev. Elzae Warrick, whose son Mancel Leland, had married Lee Drinkard. By 1953, however, the group reunited after converting to Baptist and joined the New Hope Baptist Church, where Cissy served as Minister of Music.

By 1952, Judy Guions, who had been adopted years earlier by Lee Drinkard-Warrick alongside a younger sister Sylvia, joined the group. Guoins would later change her name to Judy Clay after beginning her secular career. It was this new lineup that would perform at the Newport Jazz Festival alongside Mahalia Jackson and Sister Rosetta Tharpe as the first gospel group to perform at the venue in 1954 leading to the release of the album, The Newport Spiritual Stars, followed by another Newport live album in 1957. During this period, they would record several songs and would be seen at concert by Elvis Presley and his manager Col. Tom Parker. Parker failed to convince Lee Warrick to let the group back Presley on an upcoming gospel album but a scout for RCA Records, Presley's label, eventually got the act signed there, making them the first gospel group in history to sign with a major recording label. Their first and only studio album, A Joyful Noise, was released to critical acclaim in 1958.

During this time, the group regularly performed at the Apollo Theater and had the Gospelaires, which consisted of Lee's eldest daughters Dionne and Dee Dee Warrick as well as singer Doris Troy and Sylvia Shemwell opening for them. The group, aunt Cissy in particular, trained and mentored the group. The group eventually entered and won the amateur night competition at the Apollo. A little while later, the Gospelaires found themselves recording background for secular artists such as The Drifters though they continued to perform gospel into the early 1960s.

Though the group eventually performed on the gospel show TV Gospel Time, Lee, Marie, Cissy and Anne's departures from the group by 1962 signaled the end of the Drinkard Singers. Cissy would go on to become a successful secular recording artist, first as a background session vocalist for artists such as Solomon Burke, Aretha Franklin, Elvis Presley, Dusty Springfield, The Drifters and Dionne Warwick, then as lead singer of the Grammy-nominated girl group The Sweet Inspirations, and then as a solo artist with hits such as "I'll Be There", "Tomorrow", the original version of "Midnight Train to Georgia" and "Think It Over" before returning to gospel in the 1990s where she won two Grammy Awards for the albums Face to Face and He Leadeth Me.

Member Judy Clay went on to a critically acclaimed career in soul music, mainly in duet recordings with the likes of Billy Vera and William Bell. Clay's sister Sylvia Shemwell eventually joined Cissy's session group in 1963, four years before they acquired the name of the Sweet Inspirations. Remaining close, Cissy and Anne reunited in the late 1960s to back Dionne on a gospel recording session.

In acknowledgment of her contributions to gospel and soul music, Cissy Houston was honored with the Award of Excellence at the Stellar Awards in 1990 and the R&B Foundation Pioneer Award in 1995.
