= How Do You Want Me to Love You? =

1998 single by 911

Single by 911

from the album Moving On
- Released: 22 June 1998
- Length: 3:25
- Label: Virgin; Ginga
- Songwriter: Carl Sturken and Evan Rogers
- Producer: Rose & Foster

911 singles chronology
"All I Want Is You" (1998)	"How Do You Want Me to Love You?" (1998)	"More Than a Woman" (1998)

"How Do You Want Me to Love You?" is a song by English boy band 911. It was released through Virgin Records on 22 June 1998 as the third and final single from their second studio album Moving On. It was their seventh consecutive top-10 hit single in the UK, peaking at No. 10.

== Charts ==
Chart (1998)	Peak position
Europe (Eurochart Hot 100)	56
Scotland Singles (OCC)	4
UK Singles (OCC)	10
UK Airplay (Music Week)	25
