= The Journey (911 album) =

Studio album by 911
- Released: 24 February 1997
- Recorded: 1995–96
- Genre: Pop, dance-pop
- Length: 50:53
- Label: EMI
- Producer: Eliot Kennedy, Mike Percy, Tim Lever

911 chronology
The Journey (1997)	Moving On (1998)

Singles from The Journey
- 1. "Night to Remember" Released: 29 April 1996; 2. "Love Sensation" Released: 29 July 1996; 3. "Don't Make Me Wait" Released: 28 October 1996; 4. "The Day We Find Love" Released: 10 February 1997; 5. "Bodyshakin'" Released: 21 April 1997; 6. "The Journey" Released: 30 June 1997

Professional ratings
Review scores
Source	Rating
AllMusic	4/5 stars
NME	2/10

The Journey is the debut studio album by English boy band 911. Released in the United Kingdom through EMI on 24 February 1997, it peaked at number 13 on the UK Albums Chart and spent 17 weeks in the top 40. The album was popular in Asia, where it topped the Malaysian Albums Chart and reached number six in Taiwan. The Journey contains 911's signature song, "Bodyshakin'".

== Critical reception ==
Peter Fawthorp of AllMusic said the following about the album; "It is amazing to think of all the education that could be learned if boy bands from around the world added some cultural flavor to their music. Instead of Irish tin whistles and accordions and Scottish bagpipes, we get the common denominator of '80s American/Euro synthesized pop music, albeit lifted by '90s production quality and slight traces of accents. None of this is to say that 911's The Journey is unengaging. They seem to be having as much fun as the American Backstreet Boys -- and for the record, have been around just as long. A pound of pretzels couldn't drown the taste of sugar that fizzes from The Journey, and while there is nothing original or spectacular to be found, the group deserves credit for packaging the album with as much glee as humanly possible. If you don't hum along to "Love Sensation" you're too stuffy. If you don't at least laugh with "Bodyshakin'", you're too hard. And if you mistake their version of "Rhythm of the Night" for the original (by DeBarge) and feel the need to dance... well, no one's looking."

Ian Fortnam wrote in NME that "emasculated Motown, ticky-tock, biscuit-barrel beats, lamentably clumsy, lyrical lasciviousness and drab, digital dimples permeate each and every grimly ground groove", giving it a 2/10.

== Track listing ==
No.	Title	Writer(s)	Length
1.	"Don't Make Me Wait"	John McLaughlin, Graham Gouldie, Alan Rankine	4:21
2.	"Bodyshakin'"	McLaughlin, Gouldie	3:47
3.	"Can't Stop"	McLaughlin, Gouldie	4:07
4.	"The Day We Find Love"	Eliot Kennedy, Helen Boulding	4:52
5.	"Our Last Goodbye"	Kennedy, McLaughlin, Brennan, Constable, Dawbarn	4:37
6.	"Night to Remember"	Leon Sylvers III, Dana Meyers, Nidra Beard	4:00
7.	"Take Good Care"	Kennedy, Brennan	4:12
8.	"Love Sensation"	McLaughlin, Gouldie	3:43
9.	"One More Try"	McLaughlin, Gouldie, Rankine	4:32
10.	"The Swing"	Kennedy, Mike Shayne	4:13
11.	"Rhythm of the Night"	Diane Warren	3:42
12.	"The Journey"	McLaughlin, Brennan	4:47

Japanese bonus tracks
No.	Title	Writer(s)	Length
13.	"Bodyshakin'" (Ankorhead Mix)	McLaughlin, Gouldie
14.	"Love Sensation" (One World Mix)	McLaughlin, Gouldie
15.	"The Journey" (Dance Mix)	McLaughlin, Brennan
16.	"Don't Make Me Wait" (Top-tastic Mix)	John McLaughlin, Graham Gouldie, Alan Rankine

== Credits and personnel ==
(Credits taken from AllMusic and The Journey's liner notes.)

- Chris Blair – mastering
- Lee Brennan – composer, vocalist
- Jimmy Constable – vocalist
- Spike Dawbarn – vocalist
- Goudie – composer
- Eliot Kennedy – composer, producer
- Tim Lever – producer
- John McLaughlin – composer
- Dana Meyers – composer
- Mike Percy – producer
- Shayne – composer
- Leon Sylvers III – composer
- Diane Warren – composer

== Charts and certifications ==
=== Charts ===
Chart (1997)	Peak position
Malaysian Albums (IFPI)	1
Scottish Albums (OCC)	1
Singapore Albums (SPVA)	6
Taiwan Albums (IFPI)	6
UK Albums (OCC)	13

=== Certifications ===
Region	Certification	Certified units/sales
United Kingdom (BPI)	Gold	100,000^{*}
^{*} Sales figures based on certification alone.

== Release history ==
Country	Date	Format(s)	Label
United Kingdom	24 February 1997	CD, Cassette	Virgin Records
