= Judy Clay =

American soul and gospel singer (1938–2001)

Background information
- Born: Judith Grace Guions; September 12, 1938; St. Pauls, North Carolina, U.S.
- Died: July 19, 2001 (aged 62) Fayetteville, North Carolina, U.S.
- Genres: Soul, gospel
- Occupation: Singer
- Labels: Ember, Lavette, Scepter, Stax, Atlantic

Judy Clay (September 12, 1938 – July 19, 2001) was an American soul and gospel singer, who achieved greatest success as a member of two recording duos in the 1960s.

== Life ==
Born Judith Grace Guions, in St. Pauls, North Carolina, she was raised by her grandmother in Fayetteville and began singing in church. After moving to Brooklyn in the early 1950s, she was taken in by Lee Drinkard Warrick of The Drinkard Singers. From the age of 14, she became a regular performer with the family gospel group, which had originally been formed in Newark, New Jersey, around 1938, and which also at times included Lee Warrick's sister, Emily (later known as Cissy Houston), and daughters Dionne and Delia (later better known as Dionne and Dee Dee Warwick).

She made her recording debut with the Drinkard Singers – who later became better known as The Sweet Inspirations – on their 1954 album, The Newport Spiritual Stars. She left the Drinkard Singers in 1960 and made her first solo recording, "More Than You Know", on Ember Records. This was followed by further singles on Lavette and Scepter Records, but with little commercial success, although "You Busted My Mind" later became successful on the UK's Northern soul nightclub circuit.

In 1967, Jerry Wexler of Atlantic Records teamed her up with white singer-songwriter Billy Vera to make the United States' first racially integrated duo, and The Sweet Inspirations, to record "Storybook Children". The record made No. 20 on the US R&B chart and No. 54 pop. It was seen as the first interracial duo recording for a major label.

However, Vera has stated that television executives denied them appearances together, believing (wrongly) that Vera and Clay were more than just singing partners, and, to add insult to injury, had the song performed on network TV by Nancy Sinatra and Lee Hazlewood. Clay was pregnant, at the time, with her first child by her husband, jazz drummer Leo Gatewood.

After another hit duet with Vera, "Country Girl, City Man", which reached No. 41 R&B and No. 36 pop, and an album together, she returned to Stax Records. There she had further successes, this time with William Bell. Their recording of "Private Number", reached No. 17 in the R&B chart and No. 75 on the U.S. pop chart, and had greater success in the UK where it reached No. 8 on the UK Singles Chart.

A follow-up, "My Baby Specializes", also made the R&B chart, before she returned to Atlantic for one more record with Vera, "Reaching for the Moon", and a final solo hit "Greatest Love" (No. 45 R&B in 1970).

Subsequently, she worked as a backing vocalist with Ray Charles, Aretha Franklin, Van Morrison, Donny Hathaway and Wilson Pickett. Diagnosed with a brain tumor in 1979, she returned to gospel music shortly after her recovery, and sang occasionally with Cissy Houston's gospel choir in Newark, New Jersey.

Clay died of complications following a car crash. She was 62 years old. She was survived by two sons, Todd and Leo Gatewood, a brother, Raymond Guions, and her sister, Sylvia Shemwell.

== Discography ==
=== Albums ===
- Storybook Children (Atlantic, 1968) – with Billy Vera

=== Singles ===
Year	Title	Peak chart positions		
Year	Title	US Pop	US R&B	UK
1967	"Storybook Children" (with Billy Vera)	54	20	―
1968	"Country Girl, City Man" (with Billy Vera)	36	41	―
1968	"Private Number" (with William Bell)	75	17	8
1969	"My Baby Specializes" (with William Bell)	―	45	―
1969	"Reaching for the Moon" (with Billy Vera)	―	—	―
1970	"Greatest Love"	―	45	―
"—" denotes releases that did not chart.
