= The Hitman and Her =

British TV dance music show (1988–1992)

- Presented by: Pete Waterman; Michaela Strachan
- Opening theme: "Cocoon" - Timerider / "Rofo's Theme" - Rofo
- Country of origin: United Kingdom
- Original language: English

Production
- Running time: 120 minutes
- Production company: Granada Television

Original release
- Network: ITV
- Release: 3 September 1988 – 5 December 1992

The Hitman and Her was a British television dance music programme hosted by Pete Waterman and Michaela Strachan. The programme was produced for Granada Television and ran from September 1988 until December 1992 on ITV's Night Network. At this time, ITV was the only terrestrial channel to provide 24-hour broadcasting and The Hitman and Her was one of the first UK shows to be commissioned for overnight broadcasting. It was produced for Granada Television at first by Music Box Productions, then by Granada TV itself, and later by Clear Idea Productions through to the final edition.

== Background ==
The programme presented a taste of late-night clubbing, with long segments showing crowds dancing to popular hits, occasional celebrity performances, and party games, with Waterman and Strachan acting as masters of ceremonies.

The programme toured various nightclubs, particularly in the Midlands and Northern England, as well as the South West and Scotland, broadcasting the music and dancing at the club. The first show came from Mr Smith's in Warrington on 3 September 1988, and the final show aired on 5 December 1992 from The Discothèque Royale in Manchester. The programme was often recorded on a Saturday night, edited on the fly, and shown a few hours later in the early hours of Sunday morning, half of the Saturday/Sunday version being repeated during the following night. The earlier shows were split into two halves: the first at 1 am and the second at 4 am, with LWT's Night Network magazine show sandwiched between. During 1988, The Hitman and Her was moved to 2am in some areas, while London still broadcast the show at 4am. The Hitman and Her remained at the 2am slot from April 1989 until its last broadcast. A special edition of The Hitman and Her was broadcast as part of the ITV Telethon in 1992.

Clubbers would arrive at the featured club hoping to appear on television. Often members of the crowd would be plucked out to participate in games such as "Pass The Mic!", "Showing Out", and "Clothes Swap".

In I Love 1988, Pete Waterman said that the idea for The Hitman and Her came to him when he turned on the TV late one night and the only TV station still on-air was featuring guest Elvis Costello talking about Irish politics.

== Music ==
The theme tune, "Cocoon", was performed by Timerider, a pseudonym of the German singer Fancy. The track also appeared in the film The Fruit Machine, and Waterman also used it as the signature tune for his Saturday morning Radio City show. It is still today used as the theme tune for Barnsley F.C. and is played as the team comes out onto the pitch at every home game. Latterly, the show's theme tune changed to "Rofo's theme" by Rofo.

The show acted as both an outlet to showcase artists from the PWL stable, such as Kylie Minogue, 2 Unlimited, Anticapella, and Opus III, as well as featuring the key club tunes from the day – largely as a result of Waterman's interest in the fledgling acid house scene. Speaking to The Guardian in November 2013, Waterman explained "I loved acid house and trance. I just absolutely adored it." One track the show championed in particular was "Stakker Humanoid" by Brian Dougans, which Waterman described as "a Hitman and Her tune".

In April 1992, The Hitman and Her hosted a special show at the rave night Energy from The Eclipse, Coventry, Waterman’s home city. Strachan would memorably comment that "It's too hot ... they've all got eyes like saucers..."

== Stage dancers ==
Clive 'Wiggy' Donaldson was the resident dancer. Jason Orange was invited to join Take That after appearing as a regular dancer; former dancers Jimmy Constable and Spike Dawbarn would go on to be members of the boy band 911.
