= Private Number (Judy Clay and William Bell song) =

1968 single by Judy Clay and William Bell

Single by Judy Clay and William Bell
- B-side: "Love-Eye-Tis"
- Released: 1968
- Length: 2:39
- Label: Stax
- Songwriters: William Bell, Booker T. Jones
- Producer: Booker T. Jones

William Bell singles chronology
"A Tribute to a King" (1968)	"Private Number" (1968)	"I Forgot to Be Your Lover" (1968)

"Private Number" is a song recorded by American soul singers Judy Clay and William Bell (1968). In the US, it was released as a single, where it peaked at number 17 on the Best Selling Rhythm and Blues chart and number 75 on the Billboard Hot 100. Outside the US, "Private Number" went to number eight in the United Kingdom.

== 911 version ==
"Private Number"

Single by 911 featuring Natalie Jordan or Fann Wong

from the album There It Is
- B-side: "Celebration"; "Make You My Baby"; "Rock Me Gently" (acoustic); "Hold On"
- Released: May 3, 1999
- Length: 3:32
- Label: Virgin
- Songwriters: William Bell, Booker T. Jones
- Producer: Nigel Lowis

911 singles chronology
"A Little Bit More" (1999)	"Private Number" (1999)	"Wonderland" (1999)

Alternative cover
- UK CD2 cover

English boy band 911 covered "Private Number" for their third studio album, There It Is (1999). There are two different versions of the song: one version featuring English singer Natalie Jordan and one featuring Singaporean singer Fann Wong. The song was released as the third and final single from the album on May 3, 1999, and peaked at number three on the UK Singles Chart. It was the last of their string of 10 consecutive top-10 singles in the UK.

=== Music video ===
The music video for "Private Number" was filmed in Hackney, East London. Band member Spike Dawbarn said it was the best video the trio had ever done. It features 911 performing the song in pouring rain. There are two different versions of the video, one featuring Natalie Jordan and one featuring Fann Wong. In Jordan's version, she can be seen singing her parts whilst on a television screen and in a dark room. In Wong's version, she is standing by herself in the rain as well.

=== Track listings ===
UK CD1 and cassette single

1. "Private Number" – 3:32
2. "Celebration" – 3:43
3. "Make You My Baby" – 3:09

UK CD2

1. "Private Number" (orchestral version) – 3:32
2. "Rock Me Gently" (acoustic version) – 3:22
3. "Hold On" – 5:57

=== Charts ===
==== Weekly charts ====
Chart (1999)	Peak position
Europe (Eurochart Hot 100)	15
Scotland Singles (OCC)	2
UK Singles (OCC)	3
UK Airplay (Music Week)	29

==== Year-end charts ====
Chart (1999)	Position
UK Singles (OCC)	146

=== Release history ===
Region	Date	Format(s)	Label(s)	Ref.
United Kingdom	May 3, 1999	CD; cassette	Virgin	

== Other cover versions ==
- English rock band Brinsley Schwarz recorded a studio version in 1974, but it did not get officially released until 2017 on the album It's All Over Now.
- English rock band Babe Ruth covered the song in 1975. It featured on their self-titled album Babe Ruth and was released as a single on the Harvest Records label.
- In 1983, Welsh musician Spencer Davis and Dusty Springfield recorded a version which was released on the Allegiance label in March 1984.
- In 2000, Bell performed a live version of "Private Number" with Scottish rock band Texas on Later... with Jools Holland.
- In 2011, Jon Stevens covered the song for his album Testify!
- In 2014, Bell duetted with Joss Stone on Jools' Annual Hootenanny.
- In 2016, Beverley Knight recorded a version with Jamie Cullum for her album Soulsville. The following year, Knight performed the song with Bell at a Prom celebrating Stax Records.

== Sampling ==
- The opening seconds and guitar riff of Clay and Bell's original version of the song were prominently sampled in Rappin' 4-Tay's hip-hop single, "Playaz Club", which reached #36 on the Billboard Hot 100 chart in 1994.
- The opening seconds were also sampled in Pretty Lights's "Finally Moving", which is featured on his 2006 album Taking Up Your Precious Time, Nightmares On Wax's "You Wish" from his 2006 album In a Space Outta Sound, and more recently by Purple Disco Machine on "Devil in Me", featured in his 2017 album Soulmatic.
