= Moving On (911 album) =

Studio album by 911
- Released: 6 July 1998
- Recorded: 1997
- Genres: Pop rock, teen pop
- Length: 58:59
- Label: Virgin
- Producers: Ian Curnow, Daniel Dodd, Jon Douglas, Ian Green, Phil Harding, Dave James, Eliot Kennedy, Tim Lever, Mike Percy, Chris Porter, Rose & Foster

911 chronology
The Journey (1997)	Moving On (1998)	There It Is (1999)

Singles from Moving On
- 1. "Party People...Friday Night" Released: 20 October 1997; 2. "All I Want Is You" Released: 23 March 1998; 3. "How Do You Want Me to Love You?" Released: 22 June 1998

Professional ratings
Review scores
Source	Rating
AllMusic	4.5/5 stars

Moving On is the second studio album by English boy band 911. Released in the United Kingdom through Virgin Records on 6 July 1998, it peaked at number 10 on the UK Albums Chart. All three singles from the album were top 10 hits in the UK.

== Track listing ==
No.	Title	Writer(s)	Producer(s)	Length
1.	"All I Want Is You"	John McLaughlin, Lee Brennan, Spike Dawbarn, Jon Douglas, Jimmy Constable	Douglas	4:10
2.	"Moving On"	McLaughlin, Constable, Ian Green	Green	3:24
3.	"Baby Come Back to Me"	McLaughlin, Constable, Mike Percy, Tim Lever	Phil Harding, Ian Curnow, Daniel Dodd^{[a]}	4:27
4.	"How Do You Want Me to Love You?"	Carl Sturken, Evan Rogers	Rose & Foster	3:24
5.	"That's the Way"	McLaughlin, Dave James	Green	3:26
6.	"New Groove Generation"	McLaughlin, Constable, Brennan, Dawbarn, Percy, Lever	Douglas	4:36
7.	"Make You My Baby"	McLaughlin, Constable, Brennan, Dawbarn	Douglas	3:09
8.	"Don't Walk Away"	McLaughlin, James	James	4:01
9.	"Nothing Stops the Rain"	McLaughlin, Constable, Brennan, Dawbarn, Douglas	Douglas	3:34
10.	"Should've Been the One"	McLaughlin, James	Chris Porter	3:56
11.	"Party People...Friday Night"	Constable, Brennan, Dawbarn, McLaughlin, Eliot Kennedy, Percy, Lever	Kennedy, Lever, Percy, Douglas^{[b]}	3:34
12.	"Hold On"	McLaughlin, Brennan	Harding, Curnow, Dodd^{[a]}	5:56

Notes

- ^{^[a]} signifies an assistant producer
- ^{^[a]} signifies a remixer

== Credits and personnel ==
(Credits taken from AllMusic and Moving On's liner notes.)

- Tracy Ackerman - vocals (background)
- Lee Brennan - vocals, composer
- Andy Caine - guitar
- Chris Cameron - string arrangements
- Dave Clews - keyboards
- Jimmy Constable - vocals
- Ian Curnow - keyboards, producer
- Spike Dawbarn - vocals
- Johnny Douglas - drums, keyboards, producer, remixing
- Paul Gendler - guitar
- David Grant - choir arrangement
- Ian Green - mixing, producer
- Phil Harding - drums, producer
- David James - arranger, keyboards, producer
- Eliot Kennedy - composer, producer
- Andy Kowalski - mixing engineer
- Tim Lever - producer
- John McLaughlin - composer
- Steve McNichol - engineer
- Andrew Murray - piano
- Mike Percy - producer
- Chris Porter - mixing, producer
- Alan Ross - guitar
- Ren Swan - programming
- Philip Todd - saxophone
- Dave Willis - cover photo
- Paul Wright - engineer

== Charts and certifications ==
=== Charts ===
Chart (1998)	Peak position
European Albums Chart	70
Malaysian Albums (IFPI)	1
Scottish Albums (OCC)	8
Singapore Albums (SPVA)	1
Taiwan Albums (IFPI)	2
UK Albums (Official Charts)	10

=== Certifications ===
Region	Certification	Certified units/sales
United Kingdom (BPI)	Silver	60,000^{^}
^{^} Shipments figures based on certification alone.
