= There It Is (911 album) =

Studio album by 911
- Released: 25 January 1999
- Recorded: 1998
- Genre: Teen pop; dance-pop
- Length: 32:48
- Label: Virgin
- Producer: Ian Curnow; Johnny Douglas; Phil Harding; John Holliday; Dave Lee; Steve Levine; Nigel Lowis; Trevor Steel

911 chronology
Moving On (1998)	There It Is (1999)	The Greatest Hits and a Little Bit More (1999)

Singles from There It Is
- 1. "More Than a Woman" Released: 12 October 1998; 2. "A Little Bit More" Released: 11 January 1999; 3. "Private Number" Released: 3 May 1999

Professional ratings
Review scores
Source	Rating
AllMusic	3/5 stars
Melody Maker	0/5 stars

There It Is is the third studio album by English boy band 911. Composed entirely of covers, it was released through Virgin Records on 25 January 1999, peaking at number eight on the UK Albums Chart and managing four weeks on the chart overall.

Three singles were released from the album and were all top 10 hits—"More Than a Woman", "A Little Bit More" (which became the band's only UK number-one single) and "Private Number", featuring guest vocals from Natalie Jordan (or Fann Wong in Asian countries).

== Track listing ==
No.	Title	Writer(s)	Producer(s)	Length
1.	"More Than a Woman"	Barry Gibb; Maurice Gibb; Robin Gibb	Ian Curnow; Phil Harding; Dave Lee^{[a]}	3:14
2.	"Don't Take Away the Music"	Frederick Perren; Keni St. Lewis; Christine Yarian	Nigel Lowis	3:37
3.	"A Little Bit More"	Bobby Gosh	John Holliday; Trevor Steel	3:01
4.	"Never Gonna Give You Up"	Matt Aitken; Mike Stock; Pete Waterman	Lowis	3:35
5.	"I Wanna Get Next to You"	Norman Whitfield	Steve Levine	3:45
6.	"Can't Get By Without You"	Michael Denne; Ken Gold	Levine	3:18
7.	"Rock Me Gently"	Andy Kim	Levine	3:35
8.	"Private Number" (featuring Natalie Jordan)	William Bell; Booker T. Jones	Lowis	3:32
9.	"There It Is"	Nidra Beard; Dana Meyers; Charmaine Sylvers	Lowis	4:02
10.	"You're the Best Thing"	Paul Weller	Levine	4:00
11.	"Boogie Nights"	Rod Temperton	Holliday; Steel; Lowis^{[a]}	3:34

Notes

- ^{^[a]} signifies an assistant producer

== Charts and certifications ==
=== Charts ===
Chart (1999)	Peak position
European Albums Chart	43
Malaysian Albums (IFPI)	8
Scottish Albums (OCC)	8
UK Albums (OCC)	8

=== Certifications ===
Region	Certification	Certified units/sales
United Kingdom (BPI)	Silver	60,000^{^}
^{^} Shipments figures based on certification alone.
