= The Reason 4 =

British boy band

- Genre: Pop
- Years active: 2010–2011
- Labels: Upside Records (2011–12); Syco/Epic/Sony (2010); RCA/BMI/EWR (2013)
- Past members: Glenn Vine; Marc Higgins; Nathan Rawlings; Scott White

The Reason 4 was a British boyband based in Southampton who rose to fame after reaching the judges houses stage during the UK talent show The X Factor in 2010 in the program's seventh series. The group consists of Glenn Vine, Marc Higgins, Nathan Rawlings, Scott White. Their debut single was "Take It All" and a 2012 album was underway, when they announced that they were calling it quits because of "lack of finance".

== History ==
=== The X Factor (2010) ===
Originally called The Reason, the four applied to the ITV talent show UK's The X Factor in summer of 2010 as a vocal group, composed of:

- Glenn Vine, 25 at the time, a painter and decorator by profession
- Marc Higgins, 28 and unemployed at the time
- Nathan Rawlings, 29 at the time, an electrician
- Scott White, 28 at the time, a crane driver

All were residents of Southampton, Hampshire and working in that area. Nathan Rollins and Glen Vine had been to the same school and knew each other well. Scott was also a long-time friend to Nathan. The three long-time buddies met Marc Higgins, unemployed at the time, who volunteered to make the arrangements and vocal harmony for the group they formed in January 2010.

After practising a few months, they auditioned to the seventh series of UK's The X Factor competition performing an acoustic version of Cheryl Cole's "Fight For This Love". The performance received over 1.2 million views on YouTube. After sailing through their audition and bootcamp stages, The Reason reached the judges houses stage and sang in front Simon Cowell's house in his residence in Marbella, singing Daniel Bedingfield's song "If You're Not The One", but were dropped by Simon, the mentor for the groups that year, in favour of One Direction, F.Y.D, Belle Amie and Diva Fever

=== After X Factor (2011–12) ===
After their elimination, The group were forced to change their name when Canadian band The Reason filed a lawsuit against their name. They later changed it to "The Reason 4" to reflect the four members of the group. In early 2011, The Reason 4 signed to management Upside UK and went on to sign a publishing deal with Sony ATV. In March 2011, The boys embarked on recording their first album which has been co written and produced by Eliot Kennedy famous for The Spice Girls, Take That, Bryan Adams, Celine Dion etc. and more recently creative director on The X Factor and Andy Murray, Girls Aloud, Natasha Bedingfield, Shayne Ward. The tracks were recorded at Steelworks Studio in Sheffield.

In July 2011 The Reason 4 premiered their debut music video for "Take It All" which received over 100,000 views on YouTube in one week and was put on rotation on music channels Chart Show TV, The Box, Starz and Bliss. They also appeared 3 times on TV show This Morning On 7 August 2011 they released their debut single "Take It All" which charted at number 14 in the UK independent singles chart, followed by a 6 track EP titled Crying Out Loud which was released on 15 August 2011. Channel 4 also used The Reason 4's single "Take It All" as the closing music to the 2011 coverage of the Cheltenham Races.

The Reason 4 received a great deal of press throughout 2011 including a 14-page spread in Gay Times magazine, a double page spread in Attitude and various interviews in The Daily Star and various other newspapers and magazines. They also supported Peter Andre on a number of UK tour dates through the summer, played many light switch ons where they were joined on stage by Keith Lemon in Blackpool. In November 2011 were the official support act for Joe McElderry on his UK Classic Tour alongside Roxanne Emery.

The Reason 4 were due to release their second single in 2012 said to be "Broken" in preparation for their upcoming album tentatively titled Crying Out Loud also in 2012. But on 1 June 2012, they announced that they were splitting up due to financial reasons and that their album would not be released.

== Discography ==
=== EPs ===
- 2011: Crying Out Loud

=== Singles ===
- 2011: "Take It All"
