= The Day We Find Love =

1997 single by 911

Single by 911

from the album The Journey
- Released: 10 February 1997
- Length: 4:52 (album version); 4:11 (single edit)
- Label: Ginga; Virgin
- Songwriters: Eliot Kennedy; Helen Boulding
- Producers: Eliot Kennedy; Mike Percy; Tim Lever

911 singles chronology
"Don't Make Me Wait" (1996)	"The Day We Find Love" (1997)	"Bodyshakin'" (1997)

"The Day We Find Love" is a song by English boy band 911. It was released in the United Kingdom through Virgin Records on 10 February 1997 as the fourth single from their debut studio album, The Journey (1997). The song debuted at number four on the UK Singles Chart.

== Track listings ==
UK CD1, European and US CD single

1. "The Day We Find Love" (radio edit)
2. "Don't Make Me Wait" (Top-Tastic mix)
3. "Night to Remember" (One World edit)

UK CD2

1. "The Day We Find Love" (radio edit)
2. "The Day We Find Love" (extended mix)
3. "The Day We Find Love" (swing mix)

UK cassette single

1. "The Day We Find Love" (radio edit)
2. "The Day We Find Love" (extended mix)

== Charts ==
=== Weekly charts ===
Chart (1997)	Peak position
Europe (Eurochart Hot 100)	18
Scotland Singles (OCC)	2
UK Singles (OCC)	4
UK Airplay (Music Week)	19

=== Year-end charts ===
Chart (1997)	Position
UK Singles (OCC)	108
