= Hit Me, Baby, One More Time (TV series) =

Television entertainment show

- Presented by: Vernon Kay
- Country of origin: United Kingdom

Production
- Running time: 60 minutes

Original release
- Network: ITV
- Release: 2 April – 22 May 2005
- Network: NBC
- Release: 2 June – 30 June 2005

Hit Me, Baby, One More Time is a television entertainment show first broadcast on the British television network ITV and later, as a new version, by NBC in the United States; both were presented by Vernon Kay. During each programme, five former pop stars sing their biggest hit along with a cover version of a contemporary hit. Each week one winner is picked from each show by a phone vote (in the British version) or a studio-audience vote (in the American version), leading to the grand final when the overall winner can release a single featuring both songs (in the British version) or have $20,000 donated to a charity of their choice (in the American version). The show's title was derived from a line in the Britney Spears song "...Baby One More Time".

The show proved to be a summer hit for NBC, hitting the top spot in the ratings on its first outing. Despite its success, the show was cancelled.

== UK version ==
=== Week 1 (2 April) ===
Contestant	First song (their biggest hit)	Second song (contemporary hit)
Gloria Gaynor	"I Will Survive"	"Beautiful" by Christina Aguilera
Howard Jones	"What Is Love?"	"White Flag" by Dido
Honeyz	"Finally Found"	"How You Remind Me" by Nickelback
Limahl	"Too Shy"	"This Love" by Maroon 5
Tiffany	"I Think We're Alone Now"	"Love Machine" by Girls Aloud

The first week heat was won by Tiffany.

=== Week 2 (9 April) ===
Contestant	First song (their biggest hit)	Second song (contemporary hit)
Shakin' Stevens	"This Ole House"	"Trouble" by Pink
Jaki Graham	"Set Me Free"	"Your Game" by Will Young
Belinda Carlisle	"Heaven Is a Place on Earth"	"The Scientist" by Coldplay
Haddaway	"What Is Love"	"Toxic" by Britney Spears
Doctor and the Medics	"Spirit in the Sky"	"Let Me Entertain You" by Robbie Williams

This heat was won by Shakin' Stevens.

=== Week 3 (14 April) ===
Contestant	First song (their biggest hit)	Second song (contemporary hit)
Baccara	"Yes Sir, I Can Boogie"	"Hero" by Enrique Iglesias
Mica Paris	"My One Temptation"	"Angels" by Robbie Williams
Nick Heyward	"Fantastic Day"	"Crashed the Wedding" by Busted
Carol Decker	"China in Your Hand"	"Superstar" by Jamelia
The Pasadenas	"Tribute (Right On)"	"Leave Right Now" by Will Young

This heat was won by Carol Decker.

=== Week 4 (21 April) ===
Contestant	First song (their biggest hit)	Second song (contemporary hit)
Sinitta	"So Macho"	"Single" by Natasha Bedingfield
Hue and Cry	"Labour of Love"	"Crazy in Love" by Beyoncé
The Real Thing	"You to Me Are Everything"	"Cry Me a River" by Justin Timberlake
Hazel O'Connor	"Will You?"	"Can't Get You Out of My Head" by Kylie Minogue
China Black	"Searching"	"I Believe in a Thing Called Love" by The Darkness

This heat was won by Hue and Cry.

=== Week 5 (28 April) ===
Contestant	First song (their biggest hit)	Second song (contemporary hit)
Jordan Knight	"Give It to You"	"Let Me Love You" by Mario
Rozalla	"Everybody's Free (To Feel Good)"	"Fly By II" by Blue
Junior	"Mama Used to Say"	"Gotta Get Thru This" by Daniel Bedingfield
Sabrina	"Boys (Summertime Love)"	"Hole in the Head" by Sugababes
Shalamar	"A Night to Remember"	"Hey Ya!" by Outkast

This heat was won by Shalamar.

=== Week 6 (7 May) ===
Contestant	First song (their biggest hit)	Second song (contemporary hit)
Chesney Hawkes	"The One and Only"	"She's the One" by Robbie Williams
Kelly Marie	"Feels Like I'm in Love"	"Oops!... I Did It Again" by Britney Spears
Nick Van Eede	"(I Just) Died in Your Arms"	"I Try" by Macy Gray
Sybil	"When I'm Good and Ready"	"I'm Gonna Getcha Good!" by Shania Twain
Cleopatra	"Cleopatra's Theme"	"No Good Advice" by Girls Aloud

This heat was won by Chesney Hawkes.

=== Week 7 (14 May) ===
Contestant	First song (their biggest hit)	Second song (contemporary hit)
911	"Bodyshakin'"	"Don't Stop Movin'" by S Club 7
Nathan Moore	"The Harder I Try"	"Are You Ready for Love" by Elton John
Princess	"Say I'm Your Number One"	"Slow" by Kylie Minogue
Kenny Thomas	"Thinking About Your Love"	"Don't Know Why" by Norah Jones
Ultra Naté	"Free"	"Some Girls" by Rachel Stevens

This heat was won by 911.

=== Grand Final (21 May) ===
Contestant	Song (their biggest hit)
Tiffany	"I Think We're Alone Now"
Shakin' Stevens	"This Ole House"
Carol Decker	"China in Your Hand"
Hue and Cry	"Labour of Love"
Shalamar	"A Night to Remember"
Chesney Hawkes	"The One and Only"
911	"Bodyshakin'"

The final was won by Shakin' Stevens. A single was released with both "This Ole House" and a cover of "Trouble" by Pink, which got to number twenty in the UK singles chart in June 2005.

== U.S. version ==
The American version of the show began taping on 1 June 2005 to air the following night, 2 June, on the NBC network. Winners were chosen by the studio audience and got a donation in their name to a charity of their choice.

^{1} Denotes artist who also appeared on the British version.

=== Week 1 (recorded 1 June; aired 2 June) ===
Contestant	First song (their biggest hit)	Second song (contemporary hit)
Loverboy	"Working for the Weekend"	"Hero" by Enrique Iglesias
CeCe Peniston	"Finally"	"There You'll Be" by Faith Hill
A Flock of Seagulls	"I Ran (So Far Away)"	"On the Way Down" by Ryan Cabrera
Arrested Development	"Tennessee"	"Heaven" by Los Lonely Boys
Tiffany^{1}	"I Think We're Alone Now"	"Breakaway" by Kelly Clarkson

This heat was won by Arrested Development.

=== Week 2 (recorded 8 June; aired 9 June) ===
Contestant	First song (their biggest hit)	Second song (contemporary hit)
The Knack	"My Sharona"	"Are You Gonna Be My Girl" by Jet
Haddaway^{1}	"What Is Love"	"Toxic" by Britney Spears
Tommy Tutone	"867-5309/Jenny"	"All the Small Things" by Blink-182
The Motels featuring Martha Davis	"Only the Lonely"	"Don't Know Why" by Norah Jones
Vanilla Ice	"Ice Ice Baby"	"Survivor" by Destiny's Child

This heat was won by Vanilla Ice.

=== Week 3 (recorded 15 June; aired 16 June) ===
Contestant	First song (their biggest hit)	Second song (contemporary hit)
Wang Chung	"Everybody Have Fun Tonight"	"Hot in Herre" by Nelly
Sophie B. Hawkins	"Damn I Wish I Was Your Lover"	"100 Years" by Five for Fighting
Cameo	"Word Up!"	"1985" by Bowling for Soup
Howard Jones^{1}	"No One Is to Blame"	"White Flag" by Dido
Irene Cara	"Flashdance... What a Feeling"	"I'm Outta Love" by Anastacia (performed with Cara's group Hot Caramel)

This heat was won by Irene Cara. Howard Jones won the phone in vote.

=== Week 4 (recorded 22 June; aired 23 June) ===
Contestant	First song (their biggest hit)	Second song (contemporary hit)
Greg Kihn	"The Breakup Song"	"Boulevard of Broken Dreams" by Green Day
Club Nouveau	"Lean on Me"	"Thank You" by Dido
Glass Tiger	"Don't Forget Me (When I'm Gone)"	"Everything You Want" by Vertical Horizon
Billy Vera	"At This Moment"	"True" by Ryan Cabrera
Thelma Houston	"Don't Leave Me This Way"	"Fallin'" by Alicia Keys

This heat was won by Thelma Houston. Glass Tiger won the online vote.

=== Week 5 (recorded 29 June; aired 30 June) ===
Contestant	First song (their biggest hit)	Second song (contemporary hit)
Juice Newton	"Queen of Hearts"	"Pieces of Me" by Ashlee Simpson
Animotion	"Obsession"	"Days Go By" by Dirty Vegas
Shannon	"Let the Music Play"	"Foolish" by Ashanti
P.M. Dawn	"Set Adrift on Memory Bliss"	"Blurry" by Puddle of Mudd
Missing Persons	"Words"	"Can't Get You Out of My Head" by Kylie Minogue

This heat was won by P.M. Dawn. Juice Newton won the online vote.
