= Spike Dawbarn =

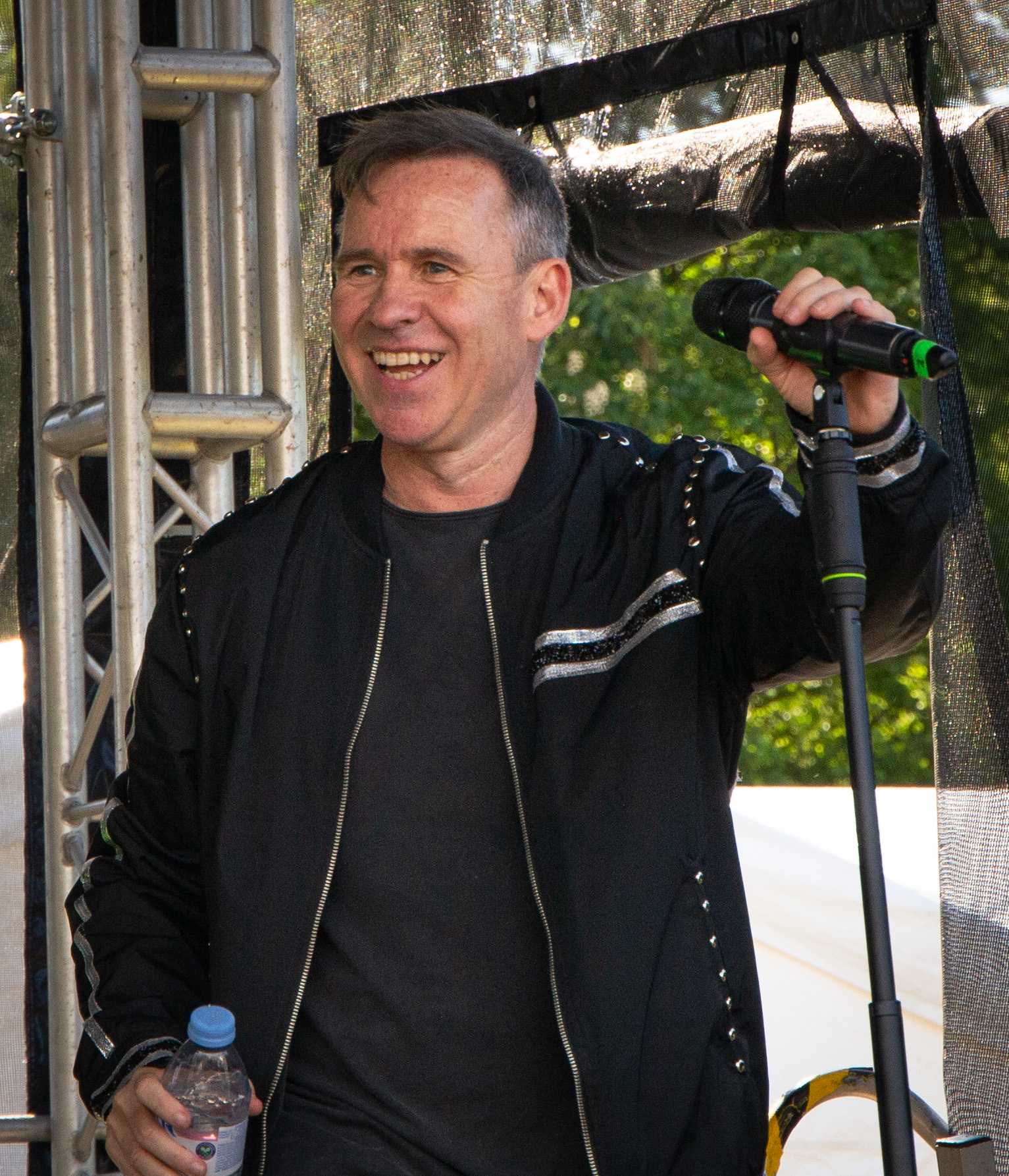
- Dawbarn with 911 at Durham Pride UK in May 2025

Background information
- Born: Simon James Dawbarn; 5 August 1974 (age 52)
- Origin: Warrington, England
- Genres: Pop, dance-pop
- Occupations: Singer, dancer
- Instrument: Vocals
- Years active: 1988–present
- Member of: 911

Simon James "Spike" Dawbarn (born 5 August 1974) is an English singer and dancer. He is a member of the boy band 911, who were originally active between 1995 and 2000 and had ten consecutive top 10 hits. In 2012, 911 reformed for the ITV2 documentary series The Big Reunion, along with other bands from their time including Five, B*Witched and Atomic Kitten.

== Biography ==
=== Early life ===
Spike Dawbarn was born in Warrington, Cheshire. His secondary education was at Beamont Collegiate Academy.

=== The Hit Man and Her and 911 ===
After being spotted by music producer Pete Waterman, Dawbarn went on to become a dancer on the ITV late night dance show The Hit Man and Her. In this role, he worked alongside Jimmy Constable and future Take That member Jason Orange. In 1995, Dawbarn and Constable formed a partnership and teamed up with frontman Lee Brennan to form 911. Their first hit got to number 38 on the UK Singles chart. Dawbarn choreographed a number of the band's dance routines.

=== PopSkool and after ===
Since 911's split in February 2000, Dawbarn has made a career joining the other band members in reunion tours. He was also director of a pop academy youth programme, PopSkool. PopSkool started in his home town of Warrington and has spread across the UK. It taught afternoon programmes in modern dance and vocal training to children between the ages of eight and sixteen. Dawbarn provided choreographic expertise and voice coaching is provided by Brennan.

Dawbarn had several 911 reunions for touring and TV appearances, including in 2008, 2012 and 2019.

On 15 October 2009, Dawbarn appeared on Never Mind the Buzzcocks's identity parade round.

== Personal life ==
Dawbarn has three sons. His niece Lexy Dawbarn performed on stage with Justin Bieber and was on ITV1's Little Big Shots.

He is a fan of Manchester United.

== Filmography ==
Year	Title	Role	Notes
1998	Noel's House Party	Himself	Episode #7.18
2005	Hit Me, Baby, One More Time	Himself	Special TV show
2009	Never Mind the Buzzcocks	Himself	Episode #23.3 - Mystery guest (1 episode)
2011	Celebrity Juice	Himself	Special guest (1 episode)
2013	The Big Reunion	Himself	9 episodes
2013	Big Brother's Bit on the Side	Himself	1 episode (4 August)
2013	The Big Reunion: On Tour	Himself	3 episodes
