= Jimmy Constable =

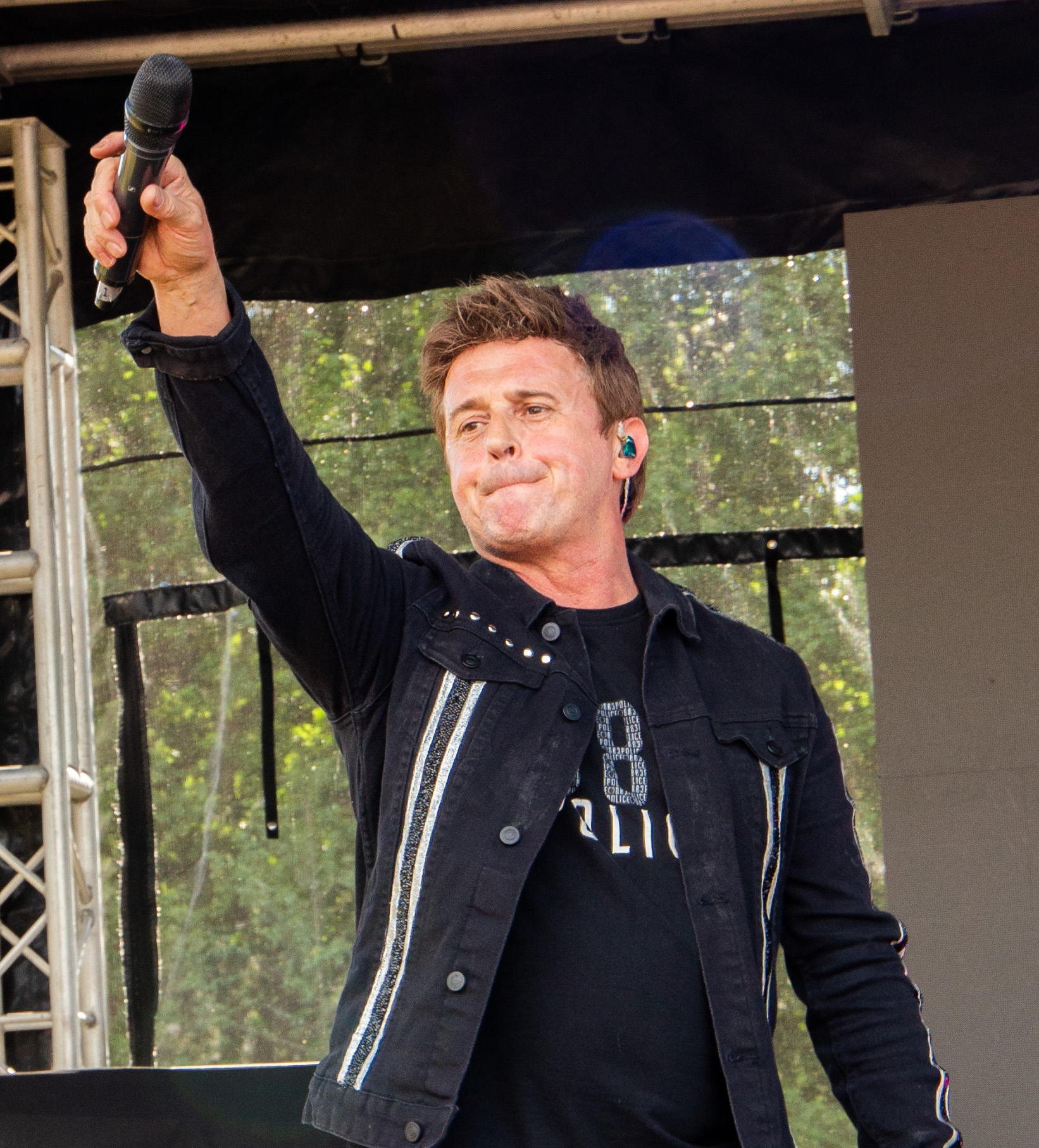
- Constable performing with 911 at Durham Pride UK in May 2025

Background information
- Born: James Michael Constable; 21 September 1971 (age 55)
- Origin: Toxteth, Liverpool, England
- Genres: Pop, dance-pop
- Occupations: Singer, dancer, songwriter
- Instrument: Vocals
- Years active: 1988–present
- Member of: 911
- Formerly of: Upper Street
- Spouse: Claire Constable (m. 2009)

James Michael Constable (born 21 September 1971) is an English pop singer, songwriter and dancer. He is a member of the pop band 911.

== Early life ==
Constable was born in Oxford Street Maternity Hospital, Liverpool to parents Margaret and Ronnie. He is a fan of Liverpool F.C.

== Career ==
=== 1990s: The Hitman and Her ===
Constable began his career in the early 1990s as a dancer on the late-night ITV dance music show The Hitman and Her.

=== 1995–2000: 911 ===
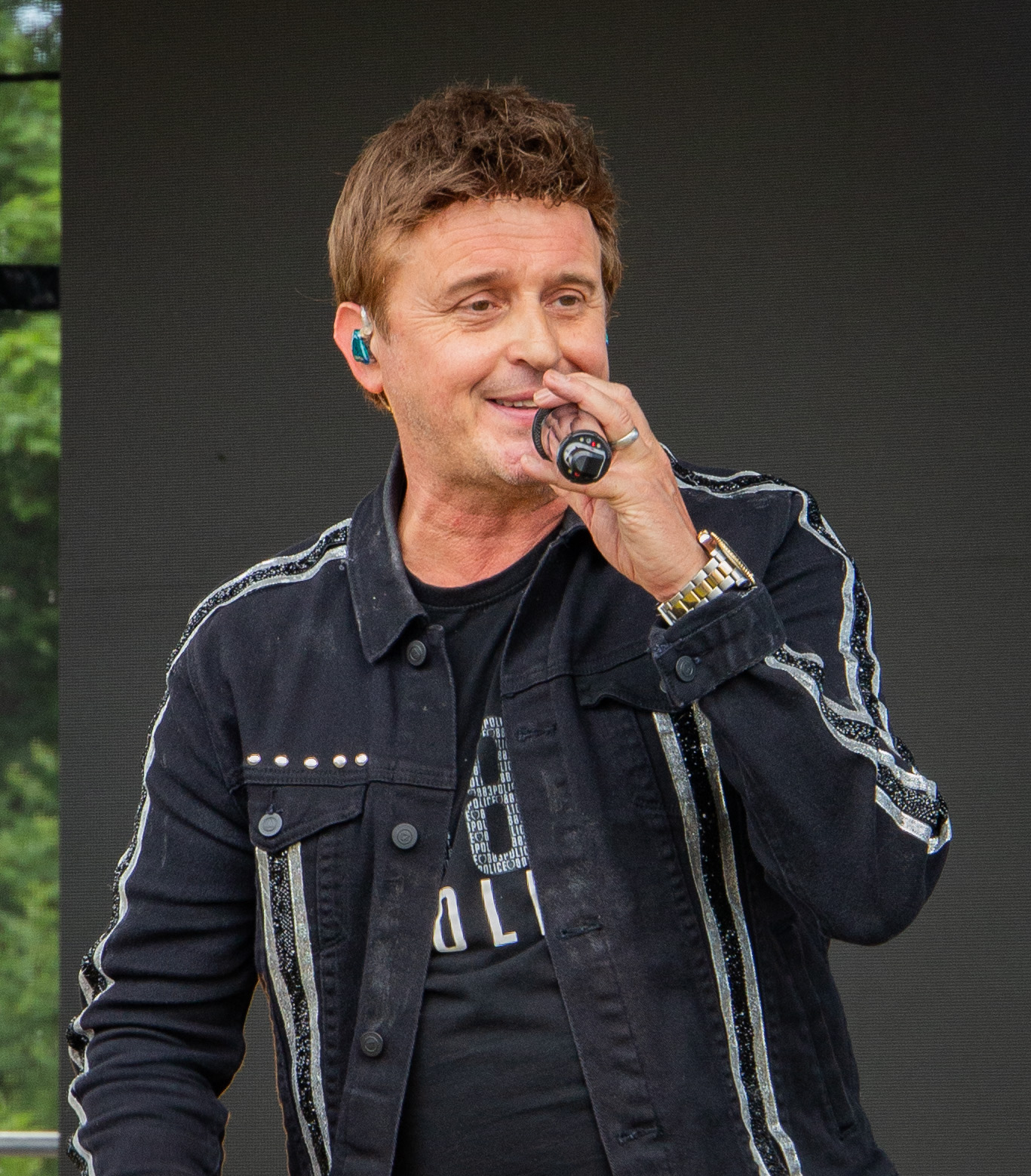
Constable performing with 911 at Durham Pride UK in May 2025

Whilst on the show, Constable met Simon "Spike" Dawbarn and Jason Orange. Having seen how successful the latter went on to become with his band Take That, Constable and Dawbarn put their own band together, and 911 was born. Lee Brennan joined the line-up and they became a trio.

911 spent several months building up a fanbase from scratch, performing gigs in schools and small public venues. After independently releasing two singles which both made the UK top 40, "Night to Remember" and "Love Sensation", 911 were signed by Virgin Records.

911 sold over 10 million singles and six million albums worldwide before splitting up in 2000. Constable announced the split live on Radio 1 and in 2005 said: "I didn't have any time to get my head around it. I had a lump in my throat saying it, then we came out of Radio 1 and the other two guys went to the pub. I got in my car and took off and I never saw them for two years."

=== Post-split ===
After the band split, Constable turned to drink and drugs, admitting "I found myself in my old single bed with a bottle of Jack Daniel's and a bottle of pain killers and thought about ending it there and then. The only thing that stopped me was thinking about the devastation it would cause for my family."

Constable return to the music industry in 2006 by taking part in the MTV series Totally Boyband. The series followed ex-members of other boy bands forming into a new band, called Upper Street. But their first single, "The One" was a commercial failure, charting at number 35 on the UK Singles Chart and the band disbanded.

On 28 August 2007, he appeared on the BBC Two game show Identity, billed as an 'ex boyband member'.

=== 2012–present: The Big Reunion and 911 comeback ===
On 18 October 2012, it was announced that 911, along with B*Witched, Five, Atomic Kitten, Honeyz and Liberty X, would be reuniting again for the ITV2 documentary series The Big Reunion.

Constable also does songwriting for other artists. He has worked with Les McKeown of the Bay City Rollers and Rod Stewart.

== Personal life ==
Constable was previously in a relationship with Bernadette Robertson, whom he met in 1985, Constable left Robertson in order to move to Glasgow, Scotland and focus on his music career with 911, although he did agree to give her away at her next wedding.

Constable lives with his wife Claire (whom he married in 2009) and two other children in St Neots.

During the COVID-19 pandemic, Constable became an ambulance driver for the National Health Service.

== Filmography ==
Year	Title	Role	Notes
1998	Noel's House Party	Himself	Episode #7.18
2005	Hit Me, Baby, One More Time	Himself	Special TV show
2007	Identity	Himself	Mystery guest (1 episode)
2011	Celebrity Juice	Himself	Special guest (1 episode)
2013	The Big Reunion	Himself	9 episodes
2013	Big Brother's Bit on the Side	Himself	1 episode (4 August)
2013	The Big Reunion: On Tour	Himself	3 episodes
