= Don't Make Me Wait (911 song) =

1996 single by 911

Single by 911

from the album The Journey
- B-side: "Vision in My Mind"; "Carefree Lover"
- Released: 28 October 1996
- Genre: Pop
- Length: 3:40
- Label: Ginga; Virgin
- Songwriters: John McLaughlin; Alan Rankin; Gordon Goudie
- Producers: Eliot Kennedy; Tim Lever; Mike Percy

911 singles chronology
"Love Sensation" (1996)	"Don't Make Me Wait" (1996)	"The Day We Find Love" (1997)

"Don't Make Me Wait" is a song by English boy band 911. It was released in the United Kingdom on 28 October 1996 as the third single from their debut studio album, The Journey (1997). It debuted and peaked at number 10 on the UK Singles Chart and at number 65 on the German Singles Chart. The song was the first of a string of consecutive top-10 hit singles in the UK.

== Critical reception ==
A reviewer from Music Week rated "Don't Make Me Wait" four out of five, adding, "A fun, mid-tempo pop track, which is another big step forward in the promising career of the three-piece boy band."

== Track listings ==
- 12-inch vinyl
1. "Don't Make Me Wait" (Alex & Ber Project Version)
2. "Don't Make Me Wait" (Smash Hits Version)
- CD1
1. "Don't Make Me Wait" (Radio Edit) – 3:40
2. "Vision in My Mind" – 4:37
3. "Carefree Lover" – 4:00
- CD2
1. "Don't Make Me Wait" (Radio Edit) – 3:40
2. "Don't Make Me Wait" (12" Extended) – 6:31
3. "Don't Make Me Wait" (Latino Mix) – 6:07
- Cardboard sleeve
1. "Don't Make Me Wait" (Alex & Ber Project Version)
2. "Don't Make Me Wait" (Smash Hits Version)

== Charts ==
Chart (1996)	Peak position
Australia (ARIA)	92
Europe (Eurochart Hot 100)	43
Germany (GfK)	65
Scotland Singles (OCC)	6
Spain Airplay (Top 40 Radio)	29
UK Singles (OCC)	10
UK Airplay (Music Week)	15
