= Bodyshakin' =

1997 single by 911

Single by 911

from the album The Journey
- Released: 21 April 1997
- Length: 3:36
- Label: Ginga; Virgin; Brilliant!
- Songwriters: John McLaughlin; Gordon Goudie
- Producers: Eliot Kennedy; Tim Lever; Mike Percy

911 singles chronology
"The Day We Find Love" (1997)	"Bodyshakin'" (1997)	"The Journey" (1997)

"Bodyshakin'" is a song by English boy band 911 from their debut studio album, The Journey (1997). Originally appearing on the B-side of "Love Sensation", it was released as the fifth single from the album on 21 April 1997, where it peaked at number three on the UK Singles Chart and remained in the chart for seven weeks. It also reached number 67 in Australia and number 19 in New Zealand. As of 2013, it has sold over 200,000 copies in the UK, receiving a silver sales certification.

== Charts ==
=== Weekly charts ===
Chart (1997)	Peak position
Australia (ARIA)	67
Europe (Eurochart Hot 100)	22
New Zealand (Recorded Music NZ)	19
Scotland Singles (OCC)	1
UK Singles (OCC)	3
UK Airplay (Music Week)	30

=== Year-end charts ===
Chart (1997)	Position
UK Singles (OCC)	64

== Certifications ==
Region	Certification	Certified units/sales
United Kingdom (BPI)	Silver	200,000^{^}
^{^} Shipments figures based on certification alone.
