= Love Sensation (911 song) =

1996 single by 911

Single by 911

from the album The Journey and Casper: A Spirited Beginning: The Soundtrack
- B-side: "Bodyshakin'"
- Released: 29 July 1996
- Length: 3:44
- Label: The Ginga Recording Co.
- Songwriters: John McLaughlin; Gordon Goudie
- Producers: Tim Lever; Mike Percy; Eliot Kennedy

911 singles chronology
"Night to Remember" (1996)	"Love Sensation" (1996)	"Don't Make Me Wait" (1996)

Audio sample
- A sample from "Love Sensation" by 911: file; help

"Love Sensation" is a song by English boy band 911. It was released in the United Kingdom through the Ginga Recording Company on 29 July 1996 as the second single from their debut studio album, The Journey (1997). The song was included on the soundtrack to the 1997 film Casper: A Spirited Beginning, prompting a US release for the single. The B-side, "Bodyshakin'", would later be released as a single in its own right.

== Chart performance ==
Released in July 1996, the single reached number 21 on the UK Singles Chart. In the United States, it peaked at number three on the Billboard Bubbling Under Hot 100 Singles chart.

== Music video ==
There are three versions of the music video, the UK and two US versions. Both US versions feature different footage from the film Casper: A Spirited Beginning. One US version was included as a special feature in the UK VHS release of the film with the other included in the US release but they were omitted from the subsequent DVD releases of the film.

== Track listings ==
CD single

1. "Love Sensation" (radio edit) - 3:42
2. "Bodyshakin'" (radio edit) - 3:48
3. "Love Sensation" (extended mix) - 5:42
4. "Bodyshakin'" (extended mix) - 5:32

Maxi-single

1. "Love Sensation" (Smash edit) - 3:25
2. "Love Sensation" (Darrin Friedman club mix) - 8:42
3. "Love Sensation" (album version) - 3:41

Vinyl single

1. "Love Sensation" (Darrin Friedman club mix) - 8:42
2. "Love Sensation" (Smash edit) - 3:25
3. "Love Sensation" (Darrin Friedman dub mix) - 7:37
4. "Love Sensation" (album version) - 3:41

== Charts ==
Chart (1996–1997)	Peak position
Scotland Singles (OCC)	8
UK Singles (OCC)	21
US Bubbling Under Hot 100 Singles (Billboard)	3
