= Lee Brennan =

British musician

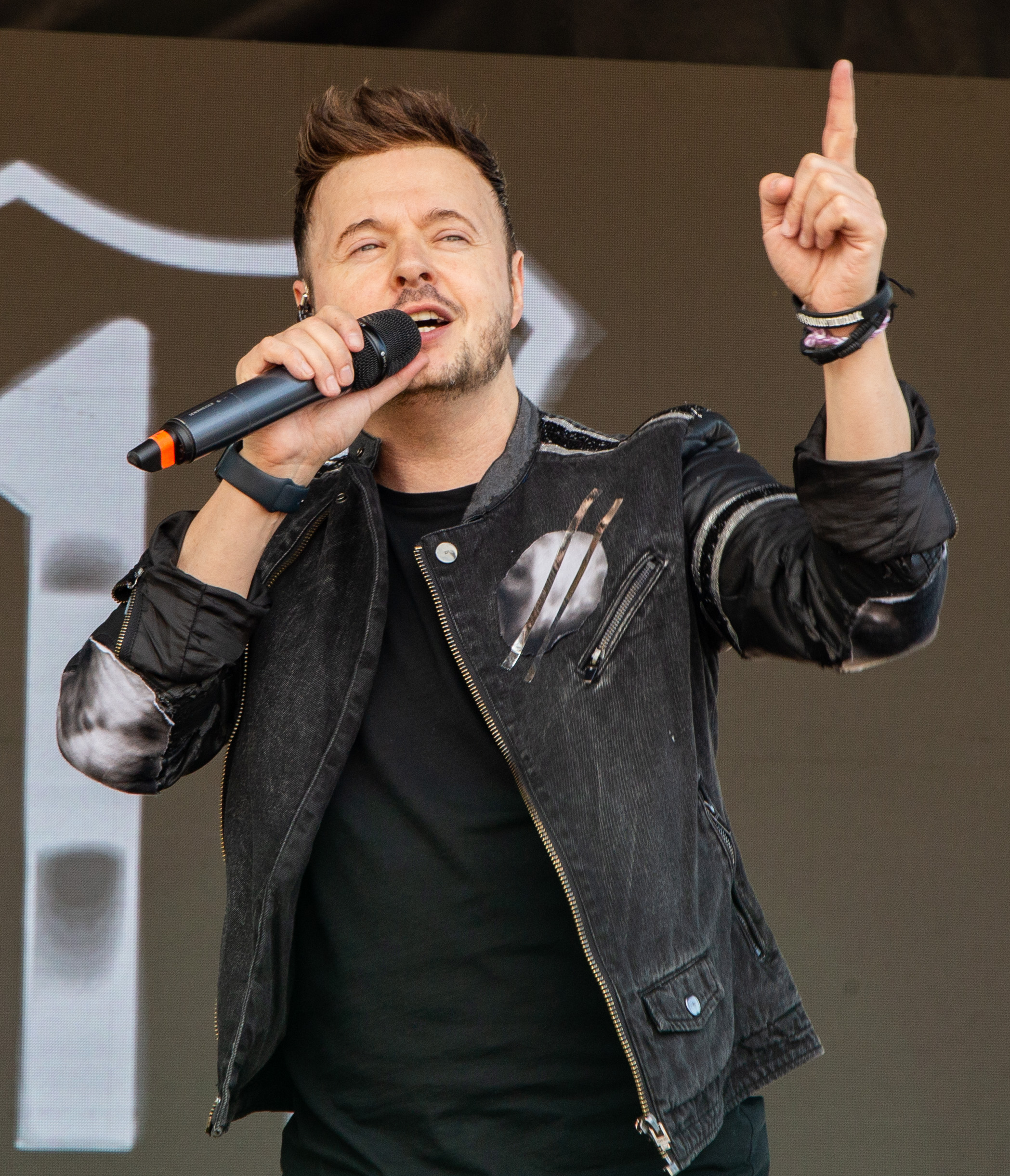
- Brennan with 911 at Durham Pride UK in May 2025

Background information
- Born: Lee Anthony Brennan; 27 September 1973 (age 52)
- Origin: Carlisle, Cumberland, England
- Genres: Pop
- Occupations: Singer, songwriter, dancer, actor
- Instrument: Vocals
- Years active: 1995–present
- Member of: 911
- Spouse: Lindsay Armaou (m. 2006; div. 2011)

Lee Anthony Brennan (born 27 September 1973) is an English singer, songwriter, dancer and actor. He is the lead vocalist of boy band 911.

== Early life ==
Lee Brennan was born on 27 September 1973 in Carlisle, Cumberland. Brennan was diagnosed with Hodgkin's lymphoma twice, first aged nine and then again aged 15, of which treatment left him infertile.

Brennan captained Carlisle United at under-14 and under-16 levels. He later wanted to play for the club professionally, but despite trials and visits from club scouts, he was turned down because he was considered too small at 5 feet 4 inches (1.63 m).

== Career ==
=== Music ===
911 were formed in 1995 when Jimmy Constable and Spike Dawbarn met on the ITV late-night dance show The Hit Man and Her and decided to form a band. After meeting Brennan, they became a trio and were signed to Virgin Records. They then released their debut single "Night to Remember", a cover of the classic Shalamar tune, in 1996. 911 released a total of 14 singles and four albums, including a Greatest Hits album. The band announced their split in 2000.

In 2005, 911 reunited and took part in Hit Me, Baby, One More Time. They were successful in gaining a place in the final, where they performed their signature song "Bodyshakin'" and S Club 7's hit "Don't Stop Movin'". Although 911 did not win the competition, the show resulted in a renewed interest in the band. Brennan regularly reunited with the other members of 911 to perform in gigs up and down the UK.

On 18 October 2012, it was announced that 911, along with B*Witched, Five, Atomic Kitten, Honeyz and Liberty X, would be reuniting again for the ITV2 documentary series The Big Reunion.

=== Acting ===
After 911's split in 2000, Brennan continued songwriting whilst pursuing an acting career. From 2003 to 2006, he performed as Peter Pan in a Christmas pantomime. "People always go on about has-beens doing panto, but I couldn't care less," he told the Evening Chronicle. "I see it as a new experience ... it keeps my mind motivated and I have ambitions to get into acting."

=== Radio ===
In April 2024, Brennan joined CRFM, a radio station in Carlisle, Cumbria.

== Personal life ==
On 14 September 2006, Brennan married Lindsay Armaou of Irish girl group B*Witched. They split in 2011.

In 2024, Brennan began dating Tobi-Jayne Cadbury, a lawyer and public speaker. They regularly appear at notable red carpet events, including the world premiere of the Boyzone documentary No Matter What in January 2025.

== Filmography ==
Year	Title	Role	Notes
1997	Smash Hits Poll Winners Party 1997	Himself	With 911
1997	Surprise, Surprise	Himself	Performing with 911
1997	The Scoop	Himself	With 911
1998	Smash Hits Poll Winners Party 1998	Himself	With 911
1998	Noel's House Party	Himself	Episode #7.18
2005	This Morning	Himself	1 episode (19 May)
2005	Hit Me, Baby, One More Time	Himself	Special TV show (2 episodes)
2013	The Big Reunion	Himself	9 episodes
2013	Big Brother's Bit on the Side	Himself	1 episode (4 August)
2013	The Big Reunion: On Tour	Himself	3 episodes
