= 911 (group) =

English boy band

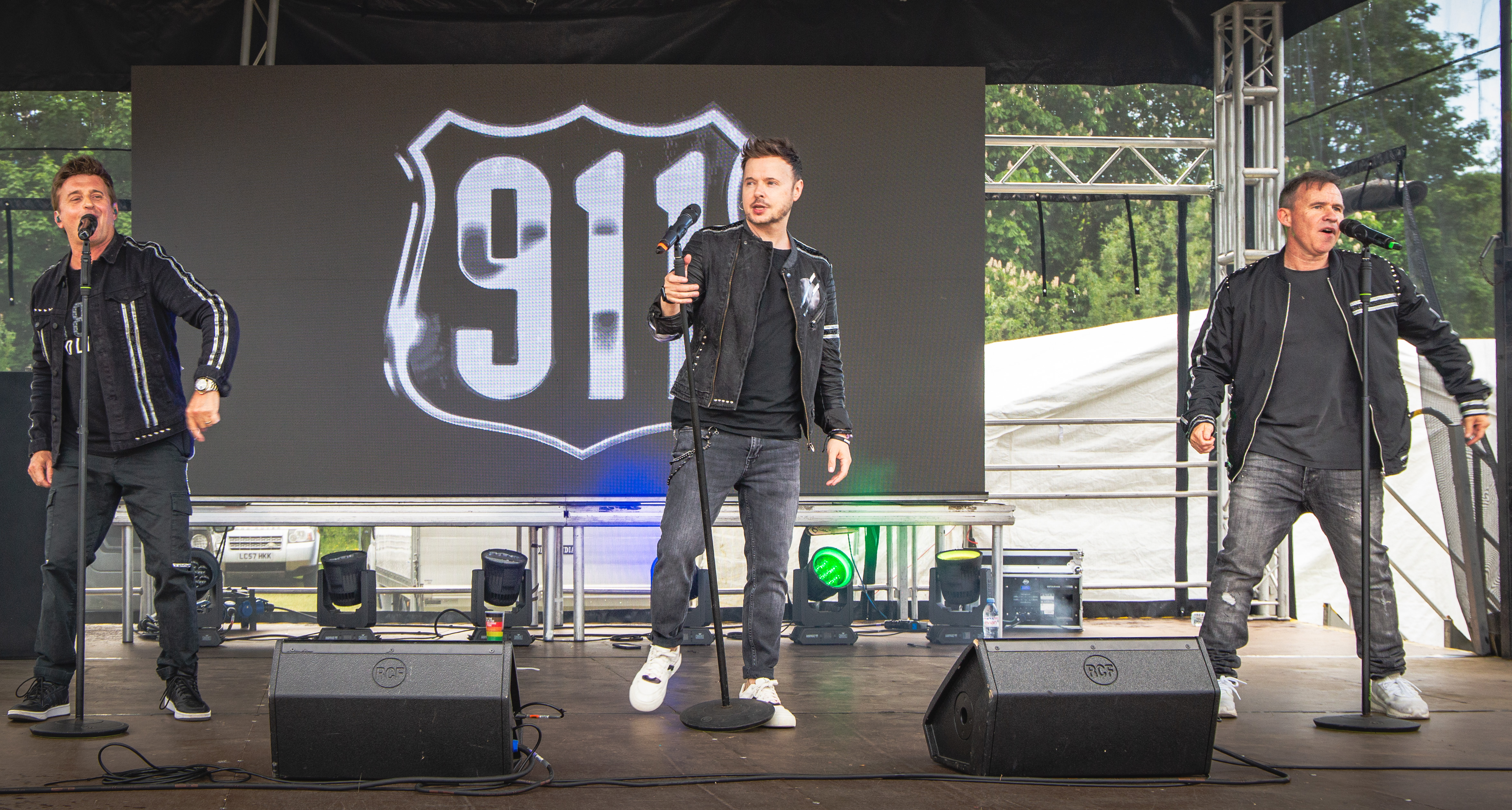
- 911 performing live at Durham Pride, May 2025 (L-R: Jimmy Constable, Lee Brennan and Spike Dawbarn).

Background information
- Origin: Carlisle, England, UK
- Genres: Pop; dance-pop
- Years active: 1995–2000; 2005; 2008–present
- Labels: Virgin; WeeJ
- Members: Lee Brennan; Jimmy Constable; Spike Dawbarn

911 (pronounced "nine one one") are an English pop group consisting of Lee Brennan, Jimmy Constable and Simon "Spike" Dawbarn. They were formed in Glasgow in 1995 and released their debut single, a cover of Shalamar's "Night to Remember", in April 1996. This was followed by their debut album, The Journey, in March 1997, which was certified Gold by the BPI in November 1997. 911 released two more Silver-certified albums, Moving On and There It Is, in 1998 and 1999, respectively. There It Is also produced their only UK number-one single, a cover of "A Little Bit More", which topped the UK Singles Chart in January 1999.

In their five years together, 911 scored ten UK top 10 singles. They sold 10 million singles and 6 million albums around the world, and were very popular in Southeast Asia, where their first two albums went to number one. They split on 26 February 2000.

After a one-off appearance in 2005 for the ITV reality show Hit Me, Baby, One More Time, 911 reunited in 2008 for a series of performances. In October 2012, it was announced that 911 would again reunite for the ITV2 reality-documentary series The Big Reunion, along with Atomic Kitten, Liberty X, B*Witched, Five and Honeyz in January 2013. Due to the highly positive reception, the groups went on an arena tour around the UK and Ireland. Their comeback album, Illuminate... (The Hits and More), was released on 8 September 2013, along with their comeback single, "2 Hearts 1 Love". In early 2014, 911 headlined their own UK tour - The Illuminate: The Hits and More Tour.

== Career ==
=== 1995: Formation ===
Dancers Jimmy Constable and Simon "Spike" Dawbarn met in the early 1990s and were both later chosen to work as dancers on the late-night ITV music show The Hit Man and Her. In 1995, after seeing how successful Jason Orange, a former dancer on the show, had been with boy band Take That, Constable and Dawbarn put their own group together. At Carlisle's radio station CFM, they met Steve Gilmour, who had previously managed PJ & Duncan and Boyzone, and asked him to be their manager a few months later. After initially turning them down he decided to manage them but they were short of a singer and Lee Brennan was recruited at Gilmour's recommendation. After holding a launch party at the Pogoda nightclub in Carlisle, they moved into Gilmour's three-bedroom flat in the south side of Glasgow; 911 then embarked on a tour of schools and under-18 clubs in the UK. Having been turned down by record companies, 911 and their management team Backlash formed their own record label, Ginga Records, with funding from businessman Frank Shapiro.

=== 1996–2000: Success ===
In April 1996, they released their debut single, a cover of Shalamar's "Night to Remember", which entered the UK Singles Chart at number 38 in May. In July, their second single "Love Sensation" was released; it charted at number 21 in August, and was later featured in the 1997 live-action film Casper: A Spirited Beginning. The success of these two independently released singles created a major record label bidding war and in September 1996, 911 were signed up by Richard Branson's Virgin Records on a £3.5 million, four-album deal. 911 won GMTV's 'Search for the Next Big Thing' and were voted the 'Second Best Newcomer' after the Spice Girls in Smash Hits.

911 had their first top 10 hit in November 1996 with "Don't Make Me Wait", which reached number 10. Nine more successive UK top 10 hits followed, including "Bodyshakin'" (which became their signature song), "Private Number" and the UK chart-topper "A Little Bit More". During this time, 911 released three studio albums, The Journey (1997), Moving On (1998) and There It Is (1999), all of which hit the top 20 on the UK Albums Chart.

At the end of 1999, 911 released a greatest hits album entitled The Greatest Hits and a Little Bit More, which included (at the time) their final single "Wonderland", before Brennan and Dawbarn decided to split the group up. On The Big Reunion, Dawbarn said: "We knew we'd reached our peak and we were kind of that little decline and we thought, 'It's best getting out at the top.'" Constable was also told by the other two that he would be the one to break the news of their break-up live on Chris Moyles' Radio 1 show on 26 February 2000. Constable said in 2005: "I didn't have any time to get my head around it. I had a lump in my throat saying it, then we came out of Radio 1 and the other two guys went to the pub. I got in my car and took off and I never saw them for two years."

=== 2005–2011: First reunion ===
In 2005, 911 reunited for the ITV reality show Hit Me, Baby, One More Time. For their first appearance on 14 May 2005, they performed their hit single "Bodyshakin'" and a cover version of S Club 7's "Don't Stop Movin'". Due to suffering a fractured ankle from a then-recent football injury, Brennan performed with a crutch on his legs. The group reached the final of the show on 21 May 2005.

In 2008, 911 reformed for a nightclub tour of the UK and Republic of Ireland, performing their most popular hits, and have also performed at a number of nightclub and university events, and they entertained the crowd prior to the Bradford Bulls clash with Leeds Rhinos on 23 May 2008. They took part in Living's Pop Goes the Band; where they came together to get back to their boy band ways, resulting in a live performance of "Bodyshakin'". The group also did a series of live performances in 2010 and 2011.

=== 2012–present: Second reunion ===
After 911 performed at Stourbridge's Party in The Park on 7 May 2012, it was announced in October 2012 that the group, along with Atomic Kitten, Liberty X, B*Witched, Five and Honeyz, would appear on the ITV2 documentary series The Big Reunion, a show which would feature the bands reuniting for the first time in several years and undergoing two weeks of intense rehearsals ahead of a comeback performance sometime in 2013. The show began airing on 31 January 2013, and the second episode, which aired on 7 February, featured Brennan, Constable and Dawbarn talking about their time together and the difficulties that came with being in a band.

The six bands performed a sold-out comeback concert at London's Hammersmith Apollo on 26 February 2013. This was followed by a UK arena tour taking place from 3–14 May 2013. Two more dates were later added for 16 and 17 May, taking the tour total to 14 shows. It was then announced that the bands would also be going on a mini-Christmas party tour in December 2013.

On 6 March 2013, 911 made an appearance on Daybreak, where they announced that they had recorded a new version of "Bodyshakin'" and were also planning to release new material. On 28 March, they appeared on This Morning and confirmed that they would be releasing a new album and touring in 2014. Brennan said: "We're doing a new album, we're going to be touring ourselves next year, so we've got lots of things to look forward to. Bring It On!". During The Big Reunion arena tour, it was announced that the band's new album would be called Illuminate. On 3 August, Brennan tweeted that the album, Illuminate... (The Hits and More), would be released on 9 September 2013 alongside their comeback single "2 Hearts 1 Love". During another appearance on This Morning on 5 August, 911 spoke about their music comeback and also performed "2 Hearts 1 Love". The group went on the Illuminate: The Hits and More Tour in March and April 2014.

On 20 March 2014, it was announced that 911 and the other boy bands from both the first and second series of The Big Reunion, Five, Blue, 3T, A1, Damage and 5th Story, would go on a nationwide tour in October 2014.

On 22 June 2019, 911 made a comeback to Southeast Asia with their concert known as 911 The Reunion in Kuala Lumpur, Malaysia with a sold-out show.

On 9 February 2023, the group collaborated with Vietnamese singer Đức Phúc for a bilingual version of "I Do" in English and Vietnamese.

== Discography ==
- The Journey (1997)
- Moving On (1998)
- There It Is (1999)
- Illuminate... (The Hits and More) (2013)
