= Wonderful =

Wonderful may refer to:

== Albums ==
- Wonderful (Adam Ant album) or the title song, 1995
- Wonderful (Circle Jerks album) or the title song, 1985
- Wonderful (Madness album), 1999
- Wonderful (Rick James album) or the title song, 1988

== Songs ==
- "Wonderful" (Angel song), 2012
- "Wonderful" (Annie Lennox song), 2004
- "Wonderful" (The Beach Boys song), 1967
- "Wonderful" (Burna Boy song), 2020
- "Wonderful" (Erakah song), 2009
- "Wonderful" (Everclear song), 2000
- "Wonderful" (Gary Go song), 2009
- "Wonderful" (Iris song), 2011
- "Wonderful" (Ja Rule song), 2004
- "Wonderful" (Luca Hänni song), 2015
- "Wonderful" (Marques Houston song), 2007
- "Wonderful", by Aretha Franklin from So Damn Happy, 2003
- "Wonderful", by Chantal Kreviazuk from Ghost Stories, 2006
- "Wonderful", by Childish Gambino from Royalty, 2012
- "Wonderful", by India.Arie from Acoustic Soul, 2001
- "Wonderful", by Janet Devlin from Hide & Seek, 2013
- "Wonderful", by Ken Jeong and Ang from the film Over the Moon, 2020
- "Wonderful", by Norman Bedard, 2009
- "Wonderful", by Ringo Starr from Ringo 2012, 2012
- "Wonderful", by Seven Nations, 2002
- "Wonderful", by Silver Sun from Silver Sun, 1997
- "Wonderful", by Stone Temple Pilots from Shangri-La Dee Da, 2001
- "Wonderful", by Travis Scott from Birds in the Trap Sing McKnight, 2016
- "Wonderful", from the stage musical Wicked, 2003

== Other uses ==
- Wonderful (band), an American pop band
- Wonderful, the official fan club of the group Wonder Girls
- Wonderful Publishing Company, a comics imprint established by Bill Pearson
- "Wonder-ful", a 2013 episode of the television series Glee
- "Wonder Full", a multimedia show at Marina Bay Sands, Singapore
- Wonderful!, an enthusiast podcast created by Rachel and Griffin McElroy
- Wonderful Terrific Monds (born 1952), American gridiron football player

== See also ==
- Wonderful Wonderful (disambiguation)
- "'S Wonderful", a song written by George and Ira Gershwin
- "So Wonderful", a song by Ladies' Code
- Mr. Wonderful (disambiguation)
- Wonder (disambiguation)
- Wunderbar (disambiguation)
