= Hide & Seek (Janet Devlin album) =

Studio album by Janet Devlin
- Released: 1 July 2013
- Recorded: 2012–2013
- Genre: Pop; folk
- Length: 40:40
- Label: PledgeMusic
- Producer: Eliot Kennedy; Jim Jayawardena

Janet Devlin chronology
Hide & Seek (2013)	Nothing Lost (2013)

Singles from Hide & Seek
- 1. "Wonderful" Released: 25 November 2013

Hide & Seek is the debut studio album by Irish singer-songwriter Janet Devlin. It received a limited release via PledgeMusic on 1 July 2013. It received a general release on 9 June 2014 under the new title Running with Scissors, including four original songs as well as reworked versions of some of the songs from Hide & Seek.

== Background and composition ==
I wanted to go off and write an album I'd be really proud of and know that, when it did come out, I wouldn't regret it. I'll have to live with it for the rest of my life

—Janet Devlin talking to Portsmouth News about the album.

Following her participation in the eighth series of the British X Factor and the X Factor Tour, Devlin started working on her debut studio album.

All of the songs were written in collaboration by Devlin and songwriters including Newton Faulkner, Eliot Kennedy and Jack Savoretti.

The limited release of the album via PledgeMusic included a bonus four-track acoustic EP, Nothing Lost, which was released on 14 August 2013. This EP had additional tracks co-written with Savoretti and Joe Janiak included as well as a cover of her X Factor audition song, "Your Song" by Elton John.

A version of "Delicate" originally included on the EP Nothing Lost was later added to the final track listing for the general release of Hide & Seek.

== Singles ==
- "Wonderful" was released in November 2013 as the album's lead single. The song peaked at No. 25 on the UK Indie Chart and at No. 3 on the Indie Breakers Chart. Its music video was released on 1 November 2013.

== Track listing ==
Hide & Seek limited release
No.	Title	Writer(s)	Producer(s)	Length
1.	"Wonderful"	Janet Devlin, Newton Faulkner, Battenberg	Eliot Kennedy, Jim Jayawardena	3:15
2.	"Creatures of the Night"	Devlin, Faulkner, Battenberg	Kennedy, Jayawardena	2:59
3.	"Working for the Man"	Devlin, Jack Savoretti	Kennedy, Jayawardena	3:05
4.	"Pick Me Up"	Devlin, Joe Janiak	Kennedy, Jayawardena	4:08
5.	"Crown of Thorns"	Devlin, Jayawardena, Philippa Hanna	Kennedy, Jayawardena	4:42
6.	"Things We Lost in the Fire"	Devlin, Kennedy, Jayawardena, Hanna	Kennedy, Jayawardena	4:01
7.	"Who Am I to You"	Devlin, Helen Boulding	Kennedy, Jayawardena	3:38
8.	"Hide & Seek"	Devlin, Faulkner, Battenberg	Kennedy, Jayawardena	3:12
9.	"Walk Away"	Devlin, Janiak	Kennedy, Jayawardena	3:46
10.	"Nothing Left to Hide"	Devlin, Janiak	Kennedy, Jayawardena	2:50
11.	"When We Were Young"	Devlin, Janiak	Kennedy, Jayawardena	5:04

== Personnel ==
Musicians

- Janet Devlin – lead vocals
- Jim Jayawardena – piano, keyboards, organ
- Roo Walker – acoustic guitar, electric guitar
- Roberto Mario Ruiz – electric bass
- Doug Harper – drums, percussion
- Eliot Kennedy – backing vocals
- Kat Eaton – backing vocals

Technical personnel

- Eliot Kennedy – production, mixing
- Jim Jayawardena – production, mixing
- James Campbell – engineering
- John Davis – mixing (single version of "Wonderful"), mastering
- Rosie Hardy – photography, design
- Simon Blois – design
