= Philippa Hanna =

English singer and songwriter

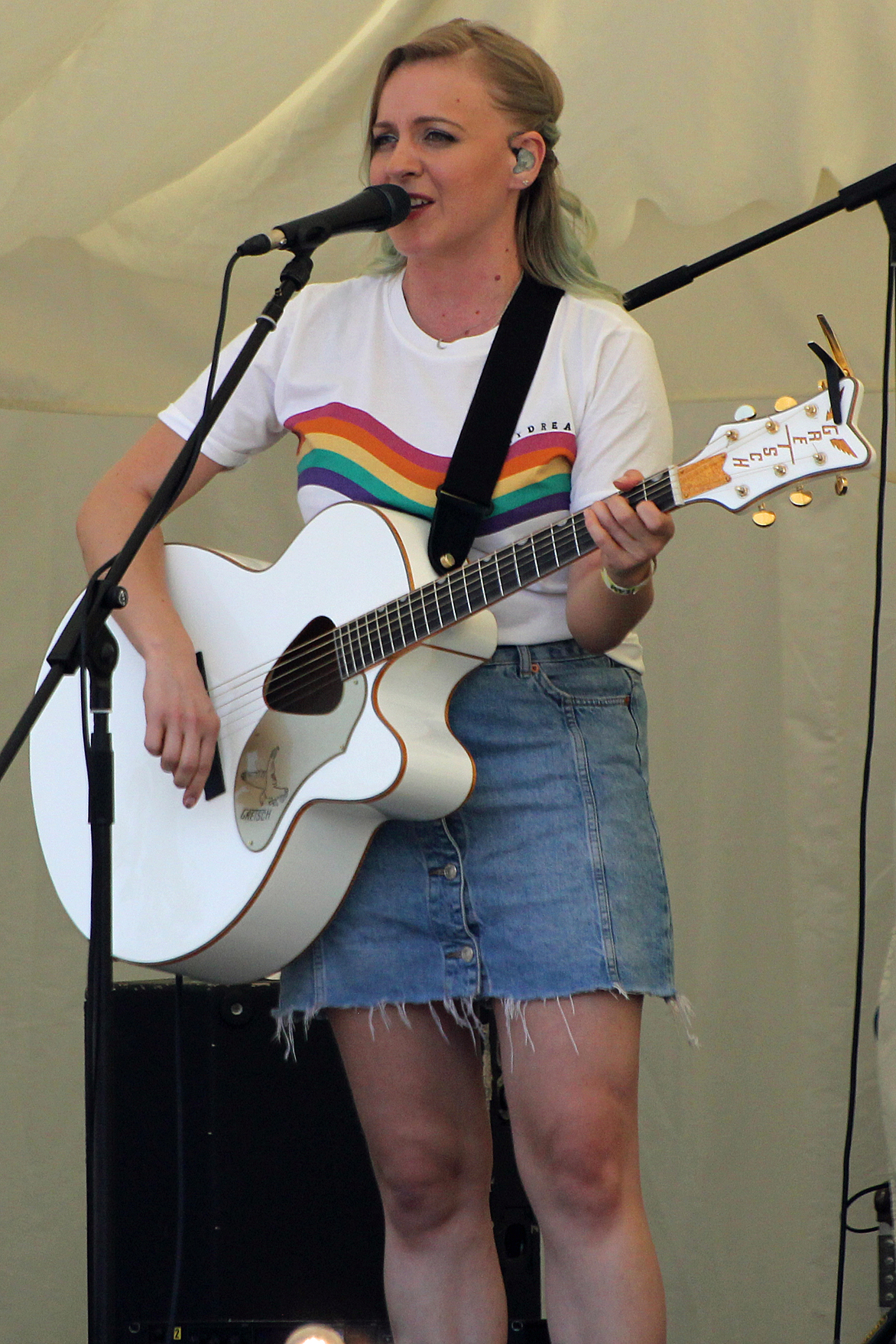
- Hanna performing in 2018

Background information
- Born: 28 March 1984 (age 42)
- Origin: Sheffield, England
- Genres: Contemporary Christian, Americana
- Occupations: Singer, songwriter
- Instruments: Vocals, guitar
- Years active: 2006–present
- Labels: Resound, Integrity Music
- Website: philippahanna.com

Philippa Hanna (born 28 March 1984) is an English singer and songwriter. She has worked in a variety of musical styles, but is mainly associated with the contemporary Christian music genre.

== Career ==
Hanna was brought up in a musical family. Her father Pat was a touring performer, and family members include brother Stuart Zender, formerly of Jamiroquai. Her songwriting is strongly influenced by her Christian faith: Her faith journey started in 2004, and the majority of her lyrical content since has had strong religious themes.

Hanna's debut album, Watching Me was released in 2007, prompting comparisons with Lou Fellingham and Phatfish. This was followed by Taste in 2009. Both records were produced in Sheffield by Andy Baker, director of Resound Media.

In addition to her own recording, she works as a songwriter with producer Eliot Kennedy. As part of his team, she has provided songwriting for Janet Devlin and Craig Colton, both finalists from the UK X-Factor series 8. Kennedy also produced Hanna's EP Out of the Blue in 2011. The record was noted for having stronger folk and country influences than her previous releases.

Hanna has also worked with Drum and bass artists since 2013 on tracks such as Back to the Street and Galaxy.

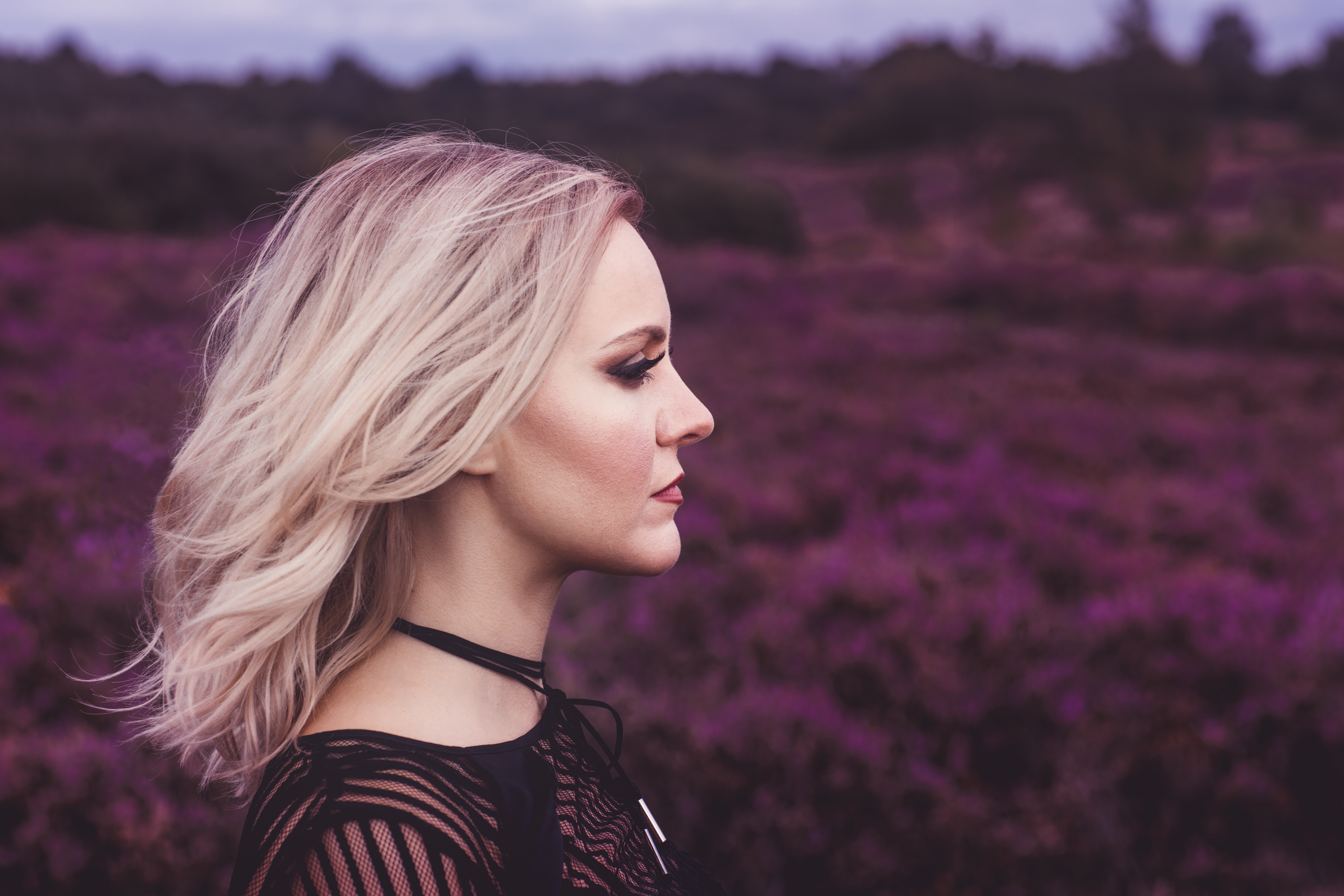
Photo of Philippa Hanna in a field of Lavender promoting the album Come Back Fighting

Hanna has appeared at a number of notable Christian festivals, including the New Wine conference, the Big Church Day Out Festival, The ONE Event in Lincoln, and the Flevo Festival in the Netherlands. In October 2012, she was announced as the support act for American soul singer Lionel Richie on the UK leg of his Tuskegee Tour. She performed at 11 UK dates with him from October to December that year.

She began work on a new album with Kennedy and his team in late 2012. The album was, in part, funded by a campaign on crowd-funding website Kickstarter that raised over £14,000. The resulting album, "Through the Woods" was released on 6 July 2013, subsequently reaching number 2 on the Official Christian & Gospel Albums Chart.

In October 2013 she was again announced as a touring support, as opening act to Wet Wet Wet on their greatest hits tour, the second support act to be announced after boyband Blue She continued to be booked as a touring support by opening for Rebecca Ferguson: Initially on the singer's UK tour in March 2014 and subsequently playing at two events organised by the Forestry Commission.

In 2015 Philippa supported Britain's Got Talent 2014 winners Collabro featuring Lucy Kay with their 31-date UK tour, and again in 2017 supported Collabro. In 2016, she supported the European leg of Little Mix's first worldwide tour, The Get Weird Tour, which took her to 10 countries. Philippa Hanna has appeared twice on the BBC programme Songs of Praise: On 2 January 2011 performing "Father" and on 6 January 2013 performing "Lighthouse".

== Other work ==
Hanna is actively involved in charitable work. She is an advocate for Compassion International, visiting Haiti with the organisation in the aftermath of the 2009 earthquake. She subsequently released the single Ave to Love, donating all proceeds to Compassion's work in the country.

She has written one book, More, published in April 2009 by Authentic Media. This book is primarily autobiographical, and deals with her experiences in becoming a Christian, tied in loosely to themes covered in her songs. Christian publishers Authentic Media signed Hanna in 2012, gaining the rights to publish her second book. Released in July 2013, Following the Breadcrumbs also followed an autobiographical style.

== Personal life ==
She is married to Joel Cana, a drummer. Together they have a daughter, Ozma Lennan Cana who was born on 14 January 2021. In mid 2025, it was discovered that she had a half-brother, Peter Cunnah, the lead singer of the 90's band, D:Ream.

== Discography ==
=== Studio albums ===
Year	Album details
2007	Watching Me: Released: 23 December 2007; Label: Resound Media
2009	Taste: Released: 26 June 2009; Label: Resound Media
2013	Through the Woods: Released: 1 July 2013; Label: Resound Media
2016	Speed of Light: Released: May 2016; Label: Resound Media
2017	Come Back Fighting: Released: November 2017; Label: Resound Media
2020	Stained Glass Stories: Released: July 2020; Label: Integrity Music
2026	Magnificent (with Israel Houghton): Released: May 2026; Label: Integrity Music

=== EPs ===
Year	EP details
2011	Out of the Blue: Released: October 2011; Label: Resound Media

=== Singles ===
Year	Single details
2020	My Hope Is In The Blood: Released: May 2020; Label: Integrity Music
2020	You're Still God: Released: May 2020; Label: Integrity Music
2020	Oh The Power (ft. Steph Macleod): Released: June 2020; Label: Integrity Music
2020	Everything Is Possible: Released: July 2020; Label: Integrity Music

== Videography ==
Year	Video details
2011	Live at the Lantern: Released: 1 April 2012; Label: Resound Media

== Bibliography ==
- More (2009) ISBN 1-8602-4755-5
- Following the Breadcrumbs (2013) ISBN 1-7807-8087-7
