= Wonders =

Wonders may refer to:

- Wonders of the World, spectacular man-made constructions and natural things in the world
- Signs and Wonders, a phrase associated with groups that are a part of modern charismatic movements and Pentecostalism
- Nevada Wonders, an American soccer team
- Wonders (album), a 2014 album by The Piano Guys
- "Wonders" (song), a 2011 song by the Sound of Arrows
- "Wonders", a song by the Script from Freedom Child
- "Wonders", a 2021 song by Michael Patrick Kelly

== See also ==
- Wonder (disambiguation)
- Wondering (disambiguation)
