= Wondertwins =

Wondertwins or Wonder Twins or variant, may refer to:

- Wonder Twins, Zan and Jayna; a DC Comics superhero team
  - The New Adventures of the Wonder Twins, webseries featuring the DC Comics pair
- The Fabulous Wonder Twins, Louis Alberto Campos and Carlos Eduardo Campos; a pair of Salvadoran fraternal twin brother celebrities
- The New Wondertwins, a stage act featuring Rebecca Finnegan and Susan Blackwell

== See also ==
- Wonder (disambiguation)
- Twin (disambiguation)
