= Little Wonder =

Little Wonder may refer to:

- "Little Wonder" (David Bowie song), 1997
- "Little Wonder" (Augie March song), 2003
- Little Wonder Records, an American record label that existed from 1914 to 1923
- "Little Wonders", a song by Rob Thomas recorded for Disney's animated feature Meet the Robinsons
- Little Wonder (horse), a British thoroughbred racehorse
- Festiniog Railway Little Wonder, a narrow gauge steam locomotive built in 1869
- "The Little Wonders" an episode of the 1960s British television series The Avengers

== See also ==
- Small Wonder (disambiguation)
