= Ethan Ash =

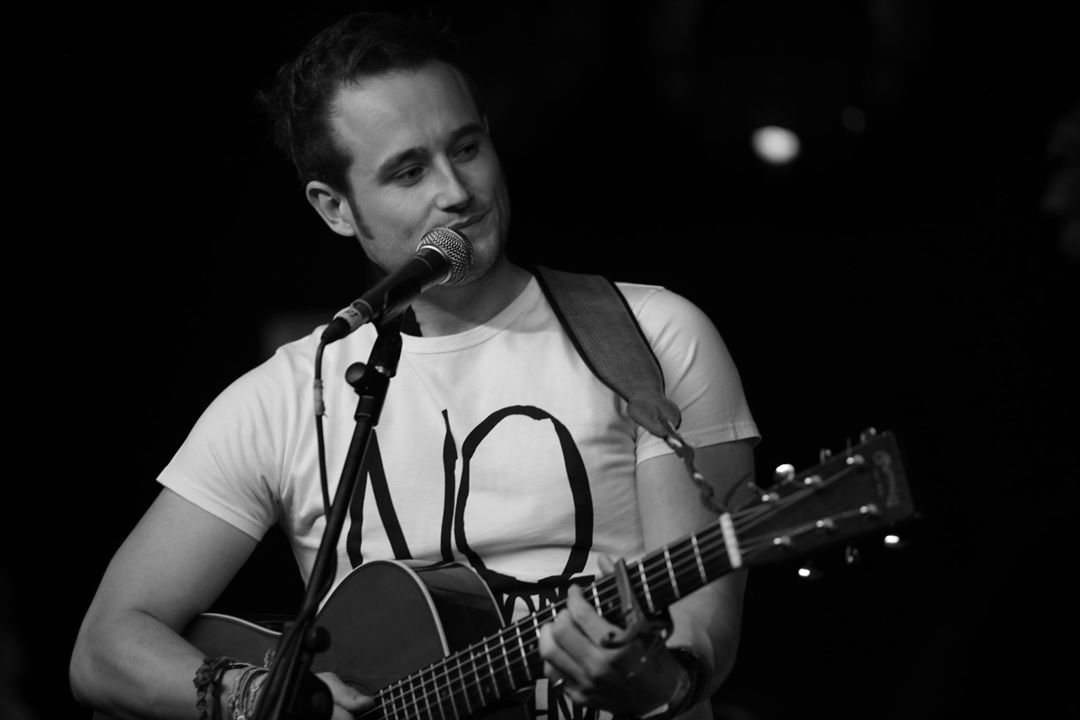
- Cambridgeshire musician Ethan Ash playing live, 2014

Background information
- Born: Newcastle upon Tyne, England
- Genres: acoustic folk, folk, soul, pop
- Occupation: Singer-songwriter
- Instruments: Vocals, guitar
- Website: ethanashmusic.com

Ethan Ash is an English singer-songwriter.

== Life and career ==
=== Early life ===
Ash was born in the North East of England and grew up in Brighton and Cambridge. He began playing classical guitar when he was just six years old before taking up the electric guitar aged twelve. He began performing both solo and in bands during his teenage years, gigging all over the UK.

=== Debut and No Early Nights EPs ===
Ash has performed live sessions for Sue Marchant's show on BBC Three Counties Radio, for BBC Cambridgeshire, BFBS Radio and various BBC Local radio sessions. After releasing his debut EP, Ash supported Seth Lakeman, Newton Faulkner and Nick Harper. Ash's second EP, No Early Nights, featured the debut single "Tried To Get Rid of Me", which was chosen as an iTunes Single of the Week in November 2010.

In 2011 Ash played The Secret Garden Party, Cambridge Folk Festival, Guilfest and Bestival. He was also chosen to support Ed Sheeran on the Birmingham and Nottingham legs of his X Tour.

=== Playing By Numbers EP ===
Ashs' six track EP, Playing By Numbers was released in October 2012. He embarked on a tour in support of the EP, playing with Rachel Sermanni, P Money, Foy Vance, Leddra Chapman, Passenger, and John Bramwell (from I Am Kloot).

=== Face To Face EP ===
Ash has recently written new material with Amy Wadge (Ed Sheeran, Lewis Watson) and Janet Devlin (Newton Faulkner). His brand new EP "Face To Face" is set to release on 16 March 2015. It features the lead single "Chasing Your Love" which has received Radio 1 play on the Huw Stephens show.

Tracks from this EP will be mixed by Grammy award winner Simon Gogerly (U2, Paloma Faith, Gwen Stefani).
