= Wonder =

Wonder may refer to:

== Arts and media ==
=== Film ===
- Wonder (film), a 2017 drama based on the R. J. Palacio novel
- The Wonder (film), a 2022 drama based on the Emma Donoghue novel
- The Wonder: Chasing Rainbows, a 2017 film also known as Into the Rainbow
- Wonder, a character in the 2006 American family film Zoom
- The Wonders, a fictional band featured in the 1996 film That Thing You Do!

=== Literature ===
- Wonder (Sawyer novel), the 2011 conclusion of a trilogy by Robert J. Sawyer
- Wonder (Palacio novel), a 2012 novel by R.J. Palacio
- Wonder (comics), a comic debuting 1892
- The Wonder (novel), by Emma Donoghue
- Wonder, the 2009 English translation of the 1962 novel De verwondering by Hugo Claus

=== Music ===
==== Albums ====
- Wonder (Lisa Mitchell album), 2009
- Wonder (Michael W. Smith album), 2010
- Wonder (Mamoru Miyano album), 2010
- Wonder (Hillsong United album), 2017
- Wonder (Shawn Mendes album), 2020
- Wonder (Knut album), 2010
- The Wonder (album), a 1990 album by Tom Verlaine
- Wonder, a 1991 album by British indie pop band 14 Iced Bears
- Wonder, a 1998 album by American singer-songwriter Katie Reider
- Wonder, a 1998 album by American singer-songwriter Annie Herring
- Wonder, a 2003 album by American singer-songwriter Faith Rivera
- Wonder, a 2013 album by Swedish musician Lustre

==== Songs ====
- "Wonder" (Embrace song), 2001
- "Wonder" (Natalie Merchant song), 1995
- "Wonder" (Naughty Boy song), 2012
- "Wonder" (Shawn Mendes song), 2020
- "Wonder", by Candy Coded from Moonlight, 2015
- "Wonder", by The Doubleclicks from Dimetrodon, 2014
- "Wonder", by Eden from Vertigo, 2018
- "Wonder", by Hillsong United from Wonder, 2017
- "Wonder", by Katy Perry from 143, 2024
- "Wonder", by Lamb Between Darkness and Wonder, 2013
- "Wonder", by Rachel Platten from Wonder Park
- "Wonder", by Soap&Skin from Narrow, 2012
- "The Wonder", by Sonic Youth from Daydream Nation, 1988
- "Wonder", by Alisabeth Von Presley which represented Iowa in the American Song Contest
- "Wonder", by Scanner from Terminal Earth, 1989
- "Wonder", by Hatchie from Liquorice, 2025

=== Other media ===
- Super Mario Bros. Wonder, a 2023 Nintendo Switch platforming game
- The Wonder, a 1714 comedy play by Susanna Centlivre

== People ==
- Wonder Mkhonza, Swaziland politician
- Wonder Monds (born 1952), American football player
- Stevie Wonder (born Stevland Hardaway Judkins in 1950), American recording artist
- Pieter Christoffel Wonder (1780–1852), Dutch painter
- Wayne Wonder (born 1972), Jamaican reggae fusion artist

== Places ==
All in the United States

- Wonder, Kentucky, an unincorporated community in Floyd County
- Wonder, Nevada, a ghost town in Churchill County
- Wonder, Oregon, an unincorporated community in Josephine County

== Transportation ==
- Disney Wonder, a cruise ship operated by Disney Cruise Line
- American Wonder, a prototype radio-control car created by the Houdina Radio Control Company

== Other uses ==
- Wonder (emotion), comparable to surprise that people feel when perceiving something rare or unexpected
- Wonder Bread, a type of pre-sliced bread, originally made in the United States
- Wonder Group, a food-delivery company; parent company of Grubhub and Blue Apron
- Wonders of the World, various lists to catalogue the world's most spectacular natural wonders and manmade structures
- The Wonder (horse), a French-bred Thoroughbred racehorse and sire
- The Wonder (pub), pub in Enfield, London, England
- Wonder, a former battery brand of Energizer company
- Wonder, a company managed by Bernard Tapie

== See also ==
- Small Wonder (disambiguation)
- Wonderful (disambiguation)
- Wonders (disambiguation)
- Wunder (disambiguation)
