= Confessional (Janet Devlin album) =

Studio album by Janet Devlin
- Released: 5 June 2020
- Recorded: 2018–20
- Genre: Pop; folk
- Length: 41:29
- Label: Insomnia Music
- Producer: Jonathan Quarmby

Janet Devlin chronology
Running with Scissors (2014)	Confessional (2020)

Singles from Confessional
- 1. "Confessional" Released: 2 October 2019; 2. "Saint of the Sinners" Released: 15 November 2019; 3. "Honest Men" Released: 14 January 2020; 4. "Away with the Fairies" Released: 13 March 2020

Confessional is the third studio album by Irish singer-songwriter Janet Devlin. It received a general release via Insomnia Music on 5 June 2020 and marked her first release following the chart success of her second album Running with Scissors almost six years previously.

== Background and composition ==
I’ve definitely matured a lot in the last six years – both musically and personally. I feel like I really found my sound with this album. I don’t think I would’ve been confident enough to try fusing Celtic sounds with pop six years ago. I’m also really glad that I’ve waited, as I’ve done so much personal growth in these past years – so I’ve never felt more ready and supported to put out an honest album such as this.

—Janet Devlin talking to Prelude Press about the album.

Following the success of her second album Running with Scissors, it took Devlin four years to write the material that would eventually form her third album. During that time, she released numerous covers on her YouTube channel, including Ed Sheeran's "I See Fire".

All of the songs were written by Devlin in collaboration with other songwriters including Fiona Bevan, Lauren Aquilina and David Sneddon. The album was produced in its entirety by Jonathan Quarmby.

In 2020, before the album's release, she released an extended play named after the album's third single "Honest Men", which contained the title track and two previously released singles, "Confessional" and "Saint of the Sinners".

== Critical reception ==
Professional ratings
Review scores
Source	Rating
Hot Press	8/10
The Irish Times	3/5 stars
musicOMH	4/5 stars

Confessional received generally positive reviews from critics. Tanis Smither of Hot Press stated that Devlin and Quarmby had found "that happy marriage between pop and traditional" and that the album was "an emotional look into an interesting artist". Nick Smith of musicOMH described the music as "a sterling mix of folk, pop and traditional Irish" and Devlin's voice as "beautiful and assertive", concluding that "Confessional is an honest, brave and knowing cathartic journey, dealing with addiction, self-harm, religion and sexuality. This is a captivating and triumphant work of art from the depth of Devlin's heart and soul." In The Irish Times Tony Clayton-Lea said that sometimes the music did not match the lyrical themes of independence and survival, with "the assertiveness of one undermined by the ineffectiveness of the other", but that overall "Devlin delivers a stinging riposte to the music business as an entity and to some people in particular".

== Track listing ==
Album and track metadata and credits adapted from iTunes and Apple Music. All tracks produced by Jonathan Quarmby.

No.	Title	Writer(s)	Length
1.	"Confessional"	Janet Devlin; Nathan Thomas	2:02
2.	"So Cold"	Devlin; Paul Statham	3:18
3.	"Saint of the Sinners"	Devlin; Bradley Mair; Jonathan Quarmby; Mattheos Herbert Weedon; Theodore Geoffrey Weedon	3:53
4.	"Cinema Screen"	Devlin; Lauren Aquilina	3:44
5.	"Speak"	Devlin; Fiona Bevan; Quarmby	3:19
6.	"Honest Men"	Devlin	4:04
7.	"Love Song"	Devlin; Bevan; Quarmby	3:33
8.	"Big Wide World"	Devlin; Aquilina	3:13
9.	"Away with the Fairies"	Devlin; Statham	3:25
10.	"Sweet Sacred Friend"	Devlin; Bevan; Quarmby	3:43
11.	"Holy Water"	Devlin; Quarmby	3:35
12.	"Better Now"	Devlin; David Sneddon; Anu Pillai	3:37
Total length:			41:29

== Personnel ==
All credits adapted from Qobuz.

- Janet Devlin – vocals
- Jonathan Quarmby – producer, piano, programming, mixing engineer, guitar, bass guitar, low whistle, keyboards, acoustic guitar, backing vocals
- Brian Fleming – bodhrán, percussion
- Nathan Thomas – backing vocals
- Peter Brown – accordion
- Eoin Dillon – uilleann pipes, whistle
- Daniel Bingham – drums
- Michael Giverin – guitar, mandolin, bouzouki
- Anna Mary Donaghy – fiddle
- Gav Skeggs – backing vocals
- Paul Statham – cello, programming
- Ian Burdge – cello
- Anna Phoebe McElligott – violin
- Richard Walker – guitar, harp, acoustic guitar, backing vocals
- Grace Davies – backing vocals
- Oscar Golding – guitar
- Nick Ereaut – double bass
- Rick Chambers – backing vocals
- Jim Molyneux – backing vocals
- Esme Allen-Quarmby – backing vocals
- Poppy Allen-Quarmby – backing vocals
- Harry Harrington – backing vocals
- Sam Odiwe – bass guitar
- Floriane Blancke – harp
- Marc Rapson – backing vocals
