= Gortin =

Village in County Tyrone, Northern Ireland

Coordinates: 54.71°N 7.23°W

Gortin: Irish: an Goirtín
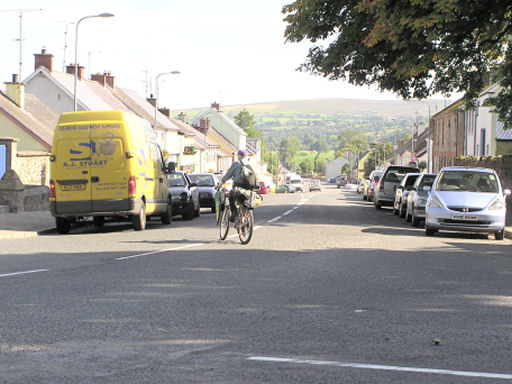
- The main street in the village

- Location within Northern Ireland
- Population: 374 (2021 census)
- Irish grid reference: H491858
  - Belfast: 70 mi (110 km)
  - Dublin: 122 mi (196 km)
- District: Fermanagh and Omagh
- County: County Tyrone
- Country: Northern Ireland
- Sovereign state: United Kingdom
- Post town: Omagh
- Postcode district: BT79
- Dialling code: 028
- UK Parliament: West Tyrone
- NI Assembly: West Tyrone

Gortin (from Irish an Goirtín, meaning 'the small enclosed field') is a village and townland in County Tyrone, Northern Ireland. It is ten miles (16 km) north of Omagh in the valley of the Owenkillew river, overlooked by the Sperrins. It had a population of 374 at the 2021 census.

== History ==
In the 1840s Gortin was in the barony of Strabane. Its 410 inhabitants lived in 81 houses indifferently built and so placed as to form one irregular street. A writer at the time described the surrounding scenery, though bold, as "generally destitute of beauty from the want of wood, which is found only at Beltrim, a residence surrounded by young and thriving plantations".

A court baron for the manor of Eliston, in which debts to the amount of 40 shillings was recoverable was held on the first Tuesday of each month and petty sessions were held once a month. The fair was held on the first Wednesday of each month and a pleasure fair was held each Easter Monday. Gortin, as well as a large area of country surrounding the village and is called Beltrim Castle, was the residence of the Hamilton (later Cole-Hamilton) family. The present castle is a modern building and the only part of the original castle which remains standing is a gable wall which at present no part of the modern building. The landlord built two Protestant churches on the estate, which was so large that the landlord was able to ride around it on horseback in a day. He was a keen sportsman and preserved the game. It was well known that if a tenant on the estate possessed a dog which could and did kill a hare and the story went to the landlord's ears, the tenant got orders to have the dog destroyed at once, and if the tenant was not prepared to do so he got "notice to quit". There was a bailiff kept on the estate whose principal duty was the control of the bog for turf cutting, who as well as his other duties, kept an eye on the progress of the tenantry and if anyone of them reclaimed any land or otherwise improved his holdings, so that the tenant was able to produce a couple of extra stacks of oats, his rent was immediately increased. The landlord served on the Grand jury, was a Magistrate, and chairman of the local petty sessions, chairman of the local board of guardians, who supervised the local workhouse and was always able to "rule the roost" and everyone else connected with these bodies were merely "yes" men.

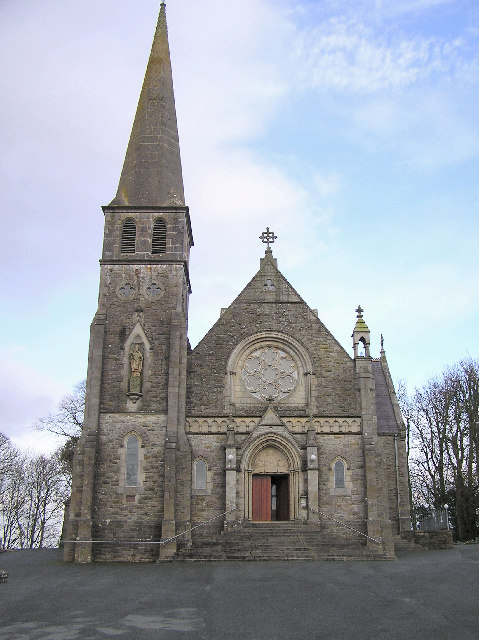
Gortin Roman Catholic church

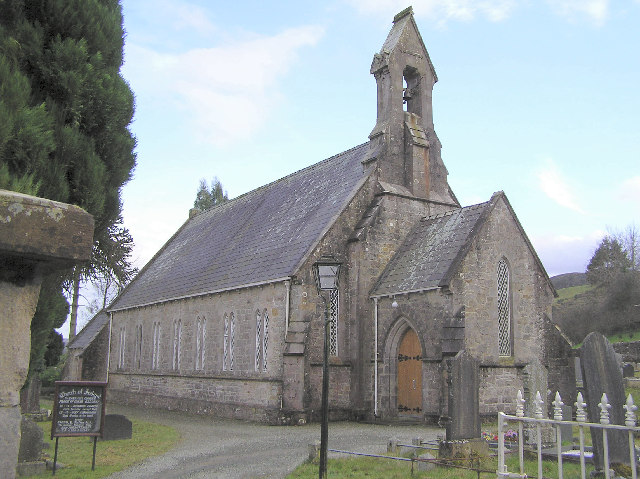
St. Patrick's Church of Ireland, Gortin

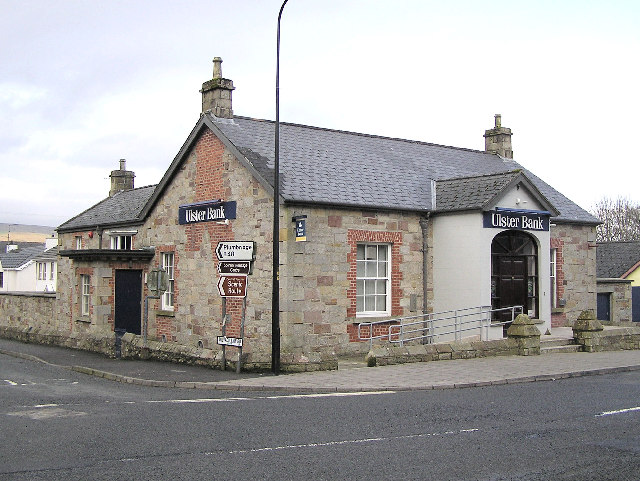
The Ulster Bank in Gortin

=== Workhouse ===
The workhouse was built in 1841 at a cost of 2,689 pounds (the site cost another 200 pounds) to accommodate 200 paupers. It consisted of a main building about 200 yards in length and three stories high, together with a general hospital and a fever hospital as well as outhouses and stores etc. It is no longer in existence nor is the village distillery which was in operation then. There was also a police station: a parish church (it was in a dilapidated state and was about to be rebuilt); a parochial school, and a dispensary. The fever hospital still stands and is now the Manse or residence of the Presbyterian minister. There is a graveyard at the southern end or gable of it containing 33 graves of people who died in it, or in the central hospital or in the workhouse. In the famine years porridge was distributed at the workhouse to any person who asked for it provided they had a utensil to carry it away. There was also seed potatoes and oats and grass seed distributed, and a fee was charged. When the end to these places came, the remaining inmates were transferred to Omagh, and the workhouse and other buildings were sold. The Presbyterian Church bought the fever hospital and grounds, to be converted into a residence for their minister; and the Catholic Church bought the workhouse and grounds; and a new church and parochial house has been built on the foundations of it. While all the knocking down and leveling of the site was taking place the Parish Priest had a home fitted up for himself, it was part of the workhouse. The Minister had about the same time moved into his and some strangers were told one day at that time, that religion was in a very bad way about Gortin at present, for the Presbyterian minister was in the fever hospital and the Parish Priest was in the workhouse.

=== Economy ===
There was a Tannery about 100 years ago, and hides and skins were tanned from a substance obtained from the bark of oak trees. The oak bark was steeped in pits, built of stone and lime, and are still traceable in a yard in the village. The leather made here was used for making harness for horses as well as boots and shoes, which were made locally. There was a company of Imperial yeomanry stationed here about 150 years ago, whose principal duty seemed to be of searching for illicit spirits or poteen. The yeomanry were supplied with a metal badge worn on their uniform about the same size as the badge worn by taxi drivers and had embossed on it the words, "Gortin Imperial Yeomanry". The which was used as their barracks has been rebuilt. It was the first house in Gortin to have stairs and two floors.

There was a brewery here at one time. It has been closed for about 100 years and a story still exists that an Excise officer from Omagh paid a visit to it once and he was never seen afterwards. There were two bakeries in Gortin at one time and the owner of one of them was in the habit of hitching up of two horses to the same number of carts and going to Dublin for two loads of flour. Each owner of the bakeries had a horse and bread cart delivering bread over the country. There was also a saw mill driven by a steam engine with the assistance of a windmill which also supplied power to a mill, for grinding Indian corn into meal and crushing oats, and for printing. There was an ordinary corn mill for grinding oats into meal.

A stream of water or burn which runs through the village supplied the brewery with water as well as the saw mill and the two other mills. There was no other power at the time. These mills have been closed for about 100 years and are now derelict. Up to about 80 years ago, a pound existed on the outskirts of the village. This was a fenced enclosure where cattle and sheep which were found trespassing and in some cases destroying crops could be impounded and held until released by the owner on payment of a fee to the pound keeper for every day or part of a day on which the animals were held.

There was a licence issued to the pound keeper otherwise he could not charge a fee for the detention of the animals, hence the saying 'your cow is in the pound.' Two trades have disappeared from the village during the past 70 years. One of them was a nailer, who made all sizes of nails from iron, called mailrod. The nails were not coated with any substance, the only tools used were a hammer and tongs, an anvil and a chisel. The other trade was a cooper, who made atts for holding butter and pails, tubs and barrels. The articles were all made to order.

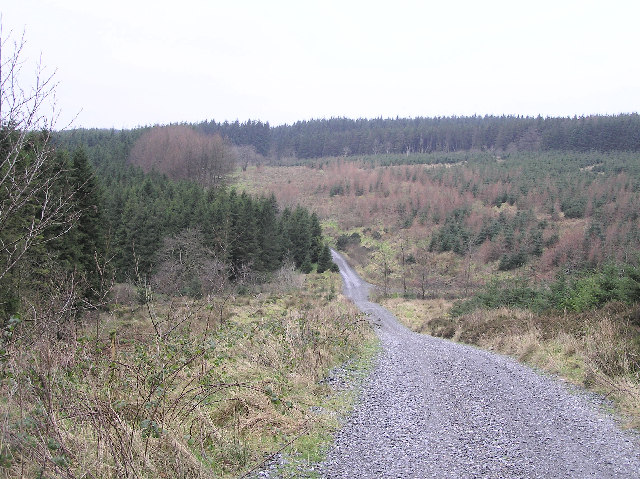
Gortin Glen Forest Park

=== The Troubles ===
On 25 May 1975, Albert Ballantine, a 19-year-old Protestant, was killed by the Ulster Volunteer Force (UVF).

== Places of interest ==
Near the village is Gortin Glen Forest Park. This was opened in 1967 and covers an area of 15.34 km^{2}.

The Ulster History Park, previously nearby, closed down in recent years. It was subsequently redeveloped as part of the Glenpark Estate, a tourist attraction and accommodation.

== Sport ==
Gortin St. Patrick's is the local Gaelic Athletic Association club.

== Notable people ==
- Janet Devlin - X Factor finalist and singer-songwriter.
