= Mr. Wonderful =

Mr. Wonderful may refer to:

== Music ==
- "Mr. Wonderful", a song by Samiyam featuring Action Bronson, 2016
- Mr. Wonderful (Action Bronson album), 2015
- Mr. Wonderful (Fleetwood Mac album), 1968
- Mr. Wonderful (Johnny "Hammond" Smith album), 1963
- "Mr. Wonderful", a 1999 single by Smile.dk
- Mr. Wonderful (musical), starring Sammy Davis Jr.
  - "Mr. Wonderful" (1955 song), the title song from the musical

== Films ==
- Mr. Wonderful (film), a 1993 film directed by Anthony Minghella

== Comics ==
- Mister Wonderful (comics), an American comic strip written and illustrated by Daniel Clowes
- "Mr. Wonderful", alternate name for Mister Mind, Fawcett Comics character

== People ==
- Paul Orndorff (1949–2021), American wrestler with the ring name, "Mr. Wonderful"
- Phil Davis (fighter) (born 1984), American mixed martial artist and collegiate wrestler
- Kevin O'Leary, Canadian businessman, investor, television personality commonly nicknamed, "Mr. Wonderful"

== See also ==
- Miss Wonderful, 1959 Peggy Lee album
- Wonderful (disambiguation)
