= Janet Devlin =

Northern Irish singer

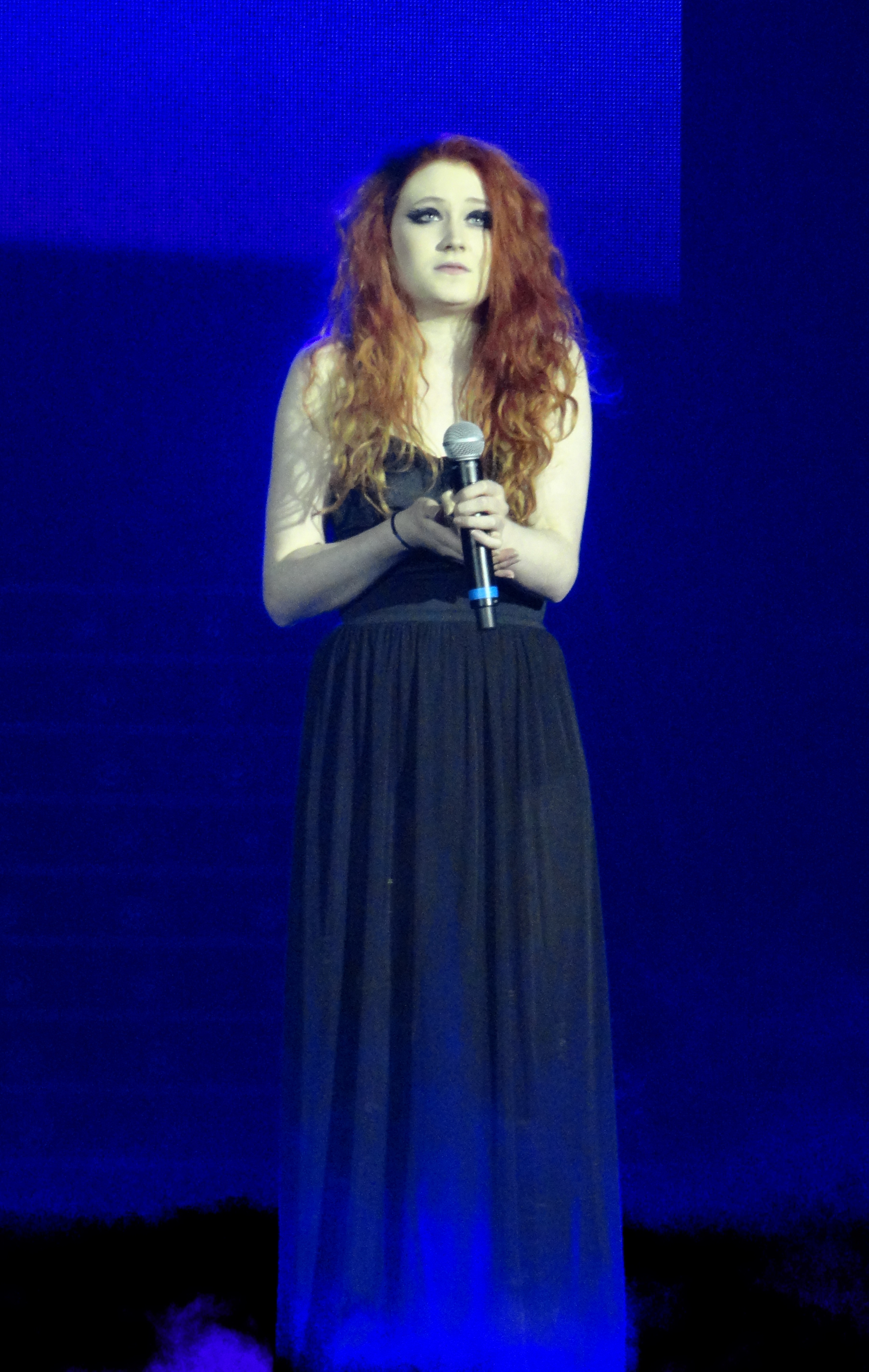
- Devlin in 2012

Background information
- Born: Janet Maureen Aoife Devlin; 12 November 1994 (age 31); Gortin, County Tyrone, Northern Ireland
- Genres: Pop, folk, Celtic, country
- Occupations: Singer, songwriter
- Years active: 2011–present
- Labels: Insomnia Music Records; OkGood! Records; Absolute
- Website: janetdevlin.com

Janet Maureen Aoife Devlin (born 12 November 1994) is an Irish singer-songwriter who competed in the eighth series of The X Factor in 2011, where she has been the twelfth contestant eliminated. Her debut album Hide & Seek was released in 2013. After a string of EPs and singles, her second studio album Confessional was released in 2020 followed by Emotional Rodeo.

== Early life and education ==
Janet Maureen Aoife Devlin was born on 12 November 1994. She is the youngest of four children to Aquinas and Patricia Devlin and has three elder brothers: Jason, Gavin and Aaron. Prior to entering The X Factor, she lived with her parents and brothers in Gortin, County Tyrone, Northern Ireland. She attended an Irish language pre-school, and later attended Drumragh Integrated College where she completed her GCSEs.

Courtney Love has stated in interviews that she believes Janet and her family to be distant relatives of Kurt Cobain, though Devlin has stated that she is unaware of any connection. Devlin's only performing experience before auditioning for The X Factor was singing in her school, pubs and local talent shows. She had uploaded a number of videos of her singing to her official channel on YouTube.

== Career ==
=== 2011: The X Factor ===
In 2011, Devlin auditioned for the eighth series of The X Factor. Her audition was screened on 20 August 2011, where she performed Elton John's "Your Song" in front of judges Louis Walsh, Gary Barlow, Kelly Rowland and Tulisa. Her audition was successful as all four judges put her through to bootcamp. After passing the bootcamp stages, Devlin then progressed to the judges' houses round and was later put through to the live shows by Rowland in her Girls category (solo females aged 16–24) alongside Misha B, Amelia Lily and Sophie Habibis. She performed Coldplay's "Fix You" in week 1 of the live shows and was put through to the next round by Rowland, as there was no public vote in the first week. Devlin topped the public vote more times than any other act, receiving the most public votes for the first four weeks of voting (weeks 2, 3, 4 and 5) and reached the quarter-final (week 8) before ending up in the bottom two with Misha B. She was voted off by Walsh and Tulisa with Rowland refusing to vote between her own acts and Barlow not being given the chance to vote. However voting statistics revealed that Devlin received more votes than Misha B meaning if the result went to deadlock, Devlin would have advanced to the semi-final and Misha B would have been eliminated. Devlin's song in the sing off was "Chasing Cars". During the live shows, Courtney Love tweeted Simon Cowell to offer to give Devlin one of Nirvana's tracks for the show, which ultimately did not occur.

==== The X Factor Performances ====
– Received the most public votes
– Denotes having been in the bottom 2

Show	Song choice	Theme	Result
Audition	"Your Song"	Free choice	Advanced
Bootcamp 1	"Breakeven"	Bootcamp challenge	Advanced
Bootcamp 2	"I Don't Want to Miss a Thing"	Bootcamp songs	Advanced
Judges' houses	"Beautiful"	Free choice	Advanced
Judges' houses	"Cosmic Love"	Free choice	Advanced
Live show 1	"Fix You"	Britain vs America	Saved by Rowland
Live show 2	"Can't Help Falling in Love"	Love and heartbreak	Safe (1st) - 23.6%
Live show 3	"Sweet Child o' Mine"	Rock	Safe (1st) - 17.2%
Live show 4	"Every Breath You Take"	Halloween	Safe (1st) - 14.7%
Live show 5	"I Want You Back"	Dancefloor fillers	Safe (1st) - 18.0%
Live show 6	"Somebody to Love"	Lady Gaga vs. Queen	Safe (2nd) - 17.4%
Live show 7	"Kiss Me"	Movies	Safe (3rd) - 14.8%
Quarter-Final	"MMMBop"	Guilty pleasures	Bottom two (4th) - 18.3%
Quarter-Final	"Under the Bridge"	Musical heroes	Bottom two (4th) - 18.3%
Final showdown (Quarter-Final)	"Chasing Cars"	Save me song	Eliminated

Soon after being eliminated from The X Factor, Devlin performed some gigs at various venues throughout the UK. One of these was the renowned G-A-Y venue (where other eliminated contestants perform) on Saturday, 3 December 2011. Finishing fifth, she was one of nine acts to perform on the X Factor Live Tour 2012, which took place in cities throughout the UK and Ireland. She performed fan favourite cover songs, 'Fix You' and 'Sweet Child o' Mine'.

=== 2012–2013: Hide & Seek ===
It was reported that Devlin had received at least three offers of a recording contract. Within hours of leaving the show Devlin had been offered a recording contract by RKA Records, a record company partly owned by Dragons' Den star and entrepreneur Duncan Bannatyne.

Following the X Factor Live Tour, Devlin began work on her debut album at Steelworks Recording Studios, Sheffield. She was first in the recording studio on 28 May 2012, where she wrote and recorded three songs ('Crown of Thorns', 'Thinking Back Yesterday' and 'Who Am I Today?') with Grammy Award and Ivor Novella Award-winning producer Eliot Kennedy and his team. The song "Crown of Thorns", which was one of the first she wrote, with Jim Jayawardena and Philippa Hanna (of Kennedy's Steelworks team), quickly became an addition to her live sets at gigs.

Devlin has written all of her songs, usually with one co-writer, for inclusion on her debut album. She has written with songwriters Joe Janiak, Helen Boulding and Ethan Ash. She has also written potential tracks for her debut release with songwriters including the Faulkner brothers, Toby and Newton Faulkner, Joshua Radin and Jack Savoretti. In 2013, Devlin stated in interviews that she had written around 25 songs and would continue to write more songs to have the best possible finished album. On 26 October 2012, she debuted two new, live edition, songs on her YouTube channel. They were "Wonderful" which was co-written with Newton Faulkner and the aforementioned "Crown of Thorns".

Devlin's debut album was launched on PledgeMusic, including a chance to record backing vocals with her, although this did not happen. In December 2012, it was stated that the album would be released in 2013, having reached 45% of the pledge target within the first two weeks. Having reached 100% on New Year's Eve 2012, Devlin began the recording of her album in early 2013. On 26 June 2013, she finished recording the limited release version of her debut album. Hide & Seek was released to pledgers on 1 July 2013. Janet released an exclusive bonus acoustic EP, Nothing Lost, to pledgers on 14 August 2013.

On 25 June 2013, Devlin worked with Newton Faulkner again, providing vocals for his new album project, #studiozoo. She provided backing vocals for 2 tracks as well as lending her voice for more of a featured backing vocal on a track called "Plastic Hearts". A live version of her song "Things We Lost in the Fire" was premiered on her YouTube channel on 6 December 2013.

=== 2014: Running with Scissors and My Delirium Tour ===
In early January 2014, Devlin debuted a new live version of her song "Delicate", (written with Jack Savoretti and a new addition to the general release album) performing with Tom Dibb (guitar and vocals), in a BalconyTV session. She won the Balcony TV Global Music Rumble two weeks in a row on 2 and 9 March and again on 23 March.

Devlin announced in March 2014 that the general release of her debut album, with the new title Running with Scissors would be on 9 June. The album would feature new single "House of Cards" (to be released on 26 May) with 3 other new original songs ("Whisky Lullabies" co written with UK songwriter Tim Jennings, "Lifeboat" and "When You Were Mine"), a cover of The Cure's "Friday I'm in Love" and reworked versions of "Delicate" (from the EP Nothing Lost), "Wonderful", "Creatures of the Night", "Things We Lost in the Fire" and "Hide & Seek" from the limited release album Hide & Seek. The reworked version of the song "Hide & Seek" features Newton Faulkner who, along with his brother, co-wrote it with Devlin. On 12 October 2015, Devlin announced she would be using PledgeMusic again to launch her preorder of her Christmas EP December Daze. She was featured on SHY & DRS' "Beautiful to Me", which was released on 13 November as the official song for Anti Bullying Week 2015. She as featured on Gareth Emery's album 100 Reasons to Live, released 31 March 2016. The song "Lost" is a remix of her song "Things We Lost in the Fire".

=== 2015–2018: EPs and singles ===
Since the release of Running with Scissors, Janet released a number of EPs and singles. The single "I Lied to You" was released in December 2018, which was called a "personal, soul-searching baring of emotion".

=== 2019–present: Confessional and Emotional Rodeo ===
Devlin's second studio album, titled Confessional, was released in June 2020 and was mastered at Abbey Road, London. Prior to the album, Devlin issued the title track "Confessional", "Saint of the Sinners", and "Honest Men" in early January 2020. This was swiftly followed up by "Away with the Fairies", "Holy Water" and finally "Big Wide World" to coincide with the album. She also released a book to accompany the album, entitled My Confessional which unlocks the meaning behind all the tracks on Confessional.

On 19 November 2021, Devlin released her version of Elton John’s song “Your Song”. "Your Song" formed part of Devlin's EP "It's Not that Deep," released on 14 December 2021. "It's Not That Deep" included two original songs - "Place Called Home" (in a regular and "Alt country mix") and "Otherside" - along with three covers: "Your Song" by Elton John, "Bad Habits" by Ed Sheeran, and "Kiss" by Prince.

On 26 April 2024, Devlin released "Emotional Rodeo". The single peaked at number 22 on the UK Singles Downloads Chart. It served as the first single from Devlin's latest studio album, also titled Emotional Rodeo, released in November 2024.

During mid-November 2025, a Christmas television advert for the Galgorm Collection in Galgorm Parks, Northern Ireland was released in the United Kingdom and Ireland. The advert features Delvin singing Cyndi Lauper's "Time After Time".

== Artistry ==
=== Influences ===
Devlin is heavily influenced by alternative artists including City and Colour, John Frusciante, Nirvana, and Devendra Banhart.

=== Notable performances ===
In 2012, Devlin performed at Croke Park, in front of a capacity 82,300 crowd, as part of the half-time show for the All Ireland Gaelic Football final on 23 September. She performed a cover of 'Fix You' and one of her self-penned original songs 'Walk Away'. She performed at the X Factor NSPCC Childline Ball on 18 October, again singing her original song 'Walk Away' and 'Fix You' by Coldplay, helping to raise over half a million pounds for the charity. On 3 November, she performed at Casement Park, as part of the pre-match entertainment, for the Michaela Foundation's charity Gaelic Football match in memory of Michaela McAreavey.

Devlin performed for the Dalai Lama on 18 April 2013 as part of Northern Ireland charity, Children in Crossfire's 'Culture of Compassion' event in Derry. On 12 May 2013, she performed a Pledger only concert at Greystones, Sheffield with a backing band consisting of Roo Walker (guitar, vocals), Jim Jayawardena (keyboard), Doug Harper (drums), Laura Kidd (bass, vocals) and Michael Giverin (mandolin). The second Pledger only concert took place at London's Troubadour on 13 May 2013.

Devlin played 14 dates across the UK and Ireland, with her band, for her 'Imaginarium Tour' in September and October 2013. Her second tour was in December 2014 and named the 'My Delirium Tour'. It had dates across the UK including 2 dates in Northern Ireland. The final stop of the tour was in Devlin's home town of Omagh.

Devlin played 4 gigs in the USA supporting Heffron Drive on their 'Happy Mistakes Unplugged' Tour in early July 2015. She placed second in the 2015 Baltic Song Contest, representing Ireland, in Karlshamn, Sweden in July 2015.

=== Films ===
In 2018, Devlin appeared in the amateur short fantasy film "Songbird" by Triskelle Pictures, directed by Sophie Black, with screenwriting by Tommy Draper.

In 2022, Devlin appeared in the documentary film "Janet Devlin: Young, Female, and Addicted," produced by Sharon Whittaker and directed by Ben O'Loan. In the documentary, Devlin explores her own story of alcoholism and its effects on her life and on others around her, while exploring the stories of other young women suffering from the consequences of alcohol addiction in themselves or in members of their family.

== Recognition ==
On 11 May 2012, Devlin was given a Civic Reception by the Town Council in Omagh, County Tyrone for her achievements on the X Factor series 8. Janet wrote two original songs for the film "Songbird," for which she played the role of Jennifer. The song "Chandeliers" (from "Songbird") won two awards - Original Song, The Midlands Movies Awards 2019; Best Foreign Theme Song, Artemis Women In Action Film Festival 2019. "Songbird" itself was nominated for Best Score/Soundtrack, Nexus Film Awards 2019. On 27 March 2021, Janet Devlin was awarded the Stagie Award for "Female Artist of the Year."

== Personal life ==
In March 2020, Devlin posted a video on YouTube explaining that she was a recovering alcoholic, and had been sober since the age of twenty. She is bisexual and has been diagnosed with borderline personality disorder and bipolar disorder.

== Discography ==
=== Studio albums ===
Title	Details	Peak chart positions		
Title	Details	UK	UK Indie	UK Indie Breakers
Hide & Seek	Released: 1 July 2013; Label: PledgeMusic; Format: Digital download	—	—	—
Running with Scissors	Released: 9 June 2014; Label: Insomnia Music/Absolute; Format: CD, digital download	43	8	1
Confessional	Released: 5 June 2020; Label: Insomnia Music; Format: CD, digital download, streaming	—	6	3
Emotional Rodeo	Release date: 15 November 2024; Label: OKGood! Records; Format: CD, LP, cassette, digital download, streaming	—	21	5

=== Extended plays ===
Title	Details	Peak chart positions
Title	Details	UK Indie Breakers
Nothing Lost	Released: 14 August 2013; Label: PledgeMusic; Format: Digital download	—
Duvet Daze	Released: 25 January 2015; Label: Insomnia Music Records/Absolute; Format: CD, digital download	—
December Daze	Released: 27 November 2015; Label: Insomnia Music/Absolute; Format: CD, digital download	14
Little Lights	Released: 4 November 2016; Label: Insomnia Music/Absolute; Format: CD, digital download	—
It's Not That Deep	Released: 14 December 2021; Label: Insomnia Music/Absolute; Format: CD, digital download	—

=== Singles ===
Single	Year	Peak chart position					Album
Single	Year	UK Digital	UK Indie	UK Indie Breakers	UK Physical	BEL (FL) Tip	Album
"Wonderful"	2013	—	25	3	—	—	Hide & Seek and Running with Scissors
"House of Cards"	2014	—	—	—	—	34	Running with Scissors
"Creatures of the Night"	2014	—	—	—	—	—	Hide & Seek and Running with Scissors
"Whisky Lullabies"	2015	—	—	—	—	—	Running with Scissors
"Outernet Song"	2016	—	—	—	7	—	Non-album singles
"I Lied to You"	2018	—	—	—	5	—	Non-album singles
"Confessional"	2019	—	—	—	3	—	Confessional
"Saint of the Sinners"	2019	—	—	—	5	—	Confessional
"Honest Men"	2021	—	—	—	—	—	Confessional
"Your Song"	2021	—	—	—	—	—	Non-album single
"Emotional Rodeo"	2024	22	—	—	85	—	Emotional Rodeo
"Country Singer"	2024	—	—	—	13	—	Emotional Rodeo
"Daddy"	2024	—	—	—	—	—	Emotional Rodeo
"Red Flag"	2024	—	—	—	—	—	Emotional Rodeo

=== As featured artist ===
Year	Single	Peak chart position			Remarks
Year	Single	UK	IRL	SCO	Remarks
2011	"Wishing on a Star"	1	1	1	Devlin sings as part of The X Factor finalists 2011 featuring JLS and One Direction
2015	"Beautiful to Me" (SHY & DRS featuring Janet Devlin)	—	—	25	
2016	"Lost" (Gareth Emery featuring Janet Devlin)	—	—	—	Remake of Devlin's song "Things We Lost in the Fire" that was featured on her album Running with Scissors

=== Music videos ===
Title	Year	Director(s)
"Wishing on a Star" (The X Factor Finalists 2011 featuring JLS and One Direction)	2011	
"Wonderful"	2013	Gary Dumbill
"House of Cards"	2014	Henry Steedman
"Creatures of the Night"	2014	Gary Dumbill^{[a]}
"Whisky Lullabies"	2015	Henry Steedman
"December Daze"	2015	Geoff Cockwill
"Outernet Song"	2016	Geoff Cockwill
"I Lied To You"	2018	Lyric video
"Confessional"	2019	Geoff Cockwill
"Saint of the Sinners"	2019	Katia Ganfield
"Honest Men"	2020	Katia Ganfield
"Away with the Fairies"	2020	Katia Ganfield
"Big Wide World"	2020	Katia Ganfield

Notes

a Illustrated, Animated and Directed

== Tours ==
- The X Factor Live Tour (2012)
- The Imaginarium Tour (2013)
- My Delirium Tour (2014)
- Happy Mistakes: Unplugged Tour (2015)
- My Opium Tour (2016)
- Confessional Tour (2021)
- It's Not That Deep Tour (2022)
