= Wondering =

Wondering may refer to:

- "Wondering" (Dirty Pretty Things song)
- "Wondering" (Patti Page song)
- "Wondering" (Claire Sproule song)
- "Wondering" (Webb Pierce song)
- "Wondering", a song by Good Charlotte from The Young and the Hopeless
- "Wondering", a song by Xiu Xiu from Forget
