= Eliot Kennedy =

British songwriter and record producer (born 1969)

Eliot Kennedy (born 29 March 1969) is an English songwriter and record producer based in Sheffield. He has worked with artists such as Céline Dion, Rebbie Jackson, Billie Piper, Spice Girls, Aretha Franklin, Mary J. Blige, Donny Osmond, Bryan Adams, Lulu, S Club 7, Human Nature, Five, Gary Barlow, Delta Goodrem, The Wanted, Janet Devlin, Lovers Electric, and Brazilian group Rouge.

== Career ==
Kennedy began writing songs with his brother at the age of thirteen and started a band at his school in Rotherham, Dinnington High School, but he was interested in composing and studio work more than performing. He apprenticed as an audio engineer, and after collecting insurance for an automobile accident, he purchased equipment and began working as an engineer on a freelance basis, which eventually led to production work. The first major band that Kennedy was in was World Still Turns, a studio band in Sheffield, along with former gospel singer John Taylor and Tom Chester; they received huge interest from all the major record companies. His first success as a producer was the hit single "Independence", the title song of the 1993 album by Lulu, which led to projects with Pauline Henry, Dannii Minogue, Kenny Thomas, and Take That.

Kennedy has contributed songs to a number of film soundtracks, including Spice World, Stepmom, The Princess Diaries 2: Royal Engagement, Racing Stripes, and Bridge to Terabithia. He was nominated with Bryan Adams for the Golden Globe Award for Best Original Song for "Never Gonna Break My Faith" from Bobby and the Satellite Award for Best Original Song for "Never Let Go" also co-written with Adams from The Guardian. Kennedy and Adams were also nominated for a Grammy Award for Never Gonna Break My Faith recorded by Aretha Franklin and Mary J. Blige, for the film Bobby. The song went on to win the Grammy for Aretha Franklin in the Gospel Section. Kennedy won an Ivor Novello award for Picture of You by Boyzone.

For the 2011 series of The X Factor UK, he was credited as Talent Development and appeared in the rehearsal studio on several episodes. Following his first series of involvement in The X Factor, he teamed up with the series' 5th placed Janet Devlin and 6th placed Craig Colton, to write songs with them.

In 2011, Kennedy was planning a concert in Sheffield to raise funds for his One Song Foundation. The concert was to mark his 21 years in the music business.

In 2012, Kennedy was given an Honorary doctorate (DUniv) by Sheffield Hallam University for his contribution to the region's music industry, and for his outstanding work for charities, including his own One Song Foundation.

In late June 2020, Aretha Franklin's solo version of "Never Gonna Break My Faith" featuring the Harlem Boys Choir was released posthumously. The song, co-written by Kennedy and Bryan Adams, quickly hit #1 on the Billboard Hot Gospel Songs chart.

Kennedy is the co-owner of The Steelworks Recording Company and also Kennedy Publishing and Production.

In September 2020, Kennedy released the album 'Mind Music'.

In February 2021, Eliot Kennedy released his first solo album entitled 'A Yacht Named Sue' to critical acclaim.

Eliot is currently working on several new projects in Film and musical theatre, including a Musical storytelling of the notorious discotheque in late 1970s New York 'Studio 54' and his next musical 'Empire State Dreams' which is set for a UK release.
