= Wonderful Wonderful (disambiguation) =

"Wonderful! Wonderful!" is a 1956 popular music song by Sherman Edwards and Ben Raleigh.

Wonderful Wonderful may also refer to:

- Wonderful! Wonderful! (album), a 2012 album by Joey DeFrancesco
- Wonderful, Wonderful (Johnny Mathis album), 1957
- Wonderful Wonderful (The Killers album), 2017
  - Wonderful Wonderful World Tour, 2017–2018 tour in support of the album
  - "Wonderful Wonderful" (The Killers song)
- "Wonderful Wonderful" (Weeds), a 2009 episode
