= Small Wonder =

Small Wonder or variants may refer to:

== Film, television and theatre ==
- Small Wonder (TV series), a 1985–1989 American sitcom
- A Small Wonder, a 1966 Australian television film
- Small Wonders, a 1995 documentary film
- Small Wonder, a 1948 Broadway revue written and directed by Burt Shevelove
- The First Time (1952 film) (working title Small Wonder), an American film directed by Frank Tashlin

== Music ==
- Small Wonder Records, a defunct British record label
- Small Wonder, a 1970s Canadian band featuring Henry Small
- "Small Wonder", a song by John Abercrombie and John Scofield from Solar, 1984

== Other uses ==
- Small Wonder (essay collection), a 2002 book by Barbara Kingsolver
- Small Wonder, a webcomic published by Viper Comics
- The Small Wonder, a nickname for the U.S. state of Delaware
