= The X Factor (British TV series) series 8 =

Season of television series

The X Factor
- Series 8
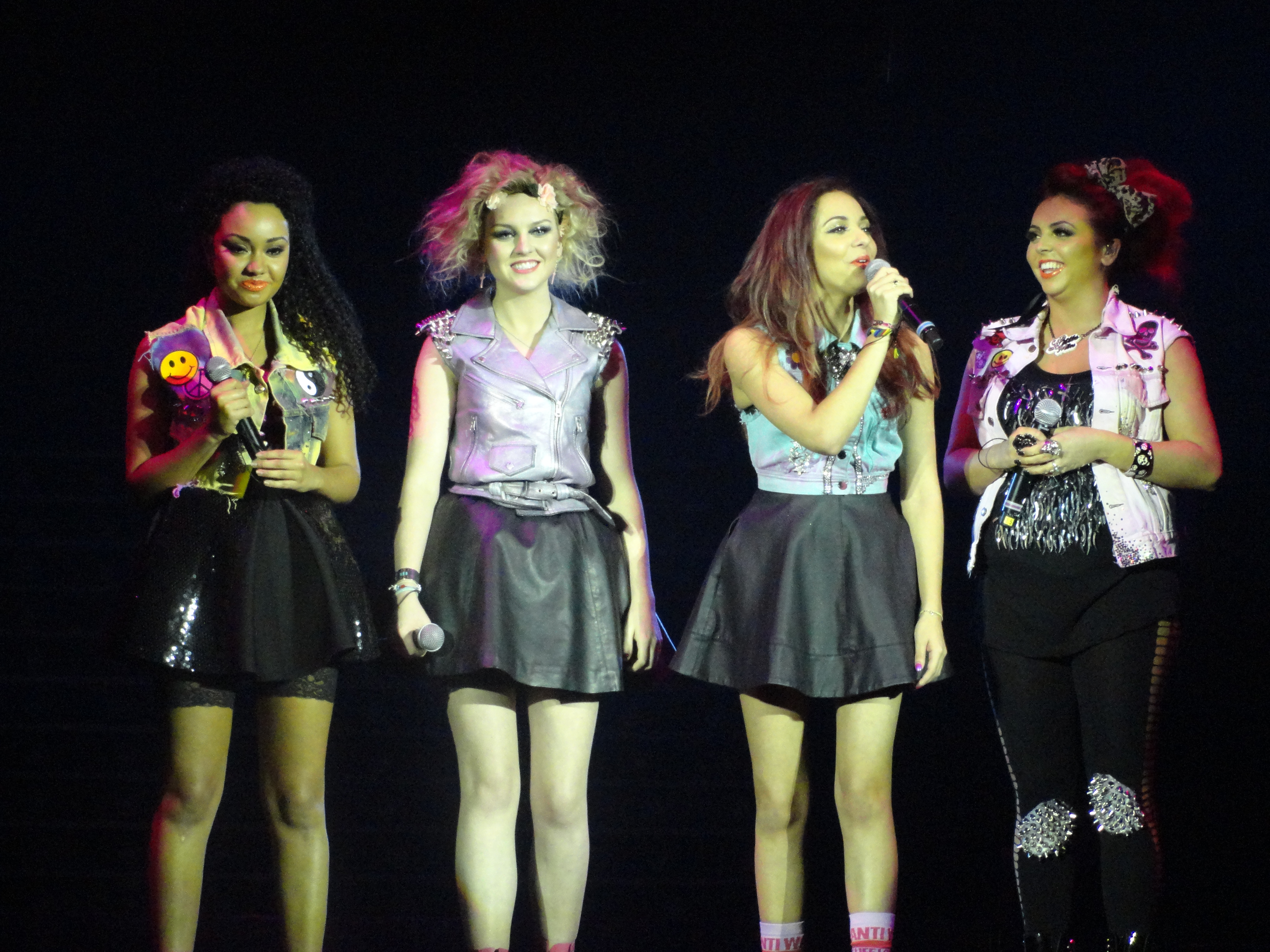
- Series winner Little Mix (pictured in 2012)
- Hosted by: Dermot O'Leary (ITV); Caroline Flack (ITV2); Olly Murs (ITV2)
- Judges: Gary Barlow; Kelly Rowland; Tulisa; Louis Walsh; Alexandra Burke (guest)
- Winner: Little Mix
- Winning mentor: Tulisa
- Runner-up: Marcus Collins
- Finals venue: Wembley Arena

Release
- Original network: ITV; ITV2 (The Xtra Factor)
- Original release: 20 August – 11 December 2011

Series chronology
- ← Previous; Series 7 Next → Series 9

The X Factor is a British television music competition to find new singing talent. The eighth series aired on ITV on 20 August 2011 and ended on 11 December 2011. Dermot O'Leary hosted the main show on ITV, while Caroline Flack and series 6 runner-up Olly Murs co-presented the spin-off show The Xtra Factor on ITV2. Louis Walsh returned to the judging panel and was joined by Gary Barlow, Kelly Rowland and Tulisa. Barlow, Rowland, Tulisa joined the panel replacing judges, Simon Cowell, Dannii Minogue and Cheryl Cole. Series 5 winner Alexandra Burke served as a guest judge for week 4 of the live shows due to Rowland having a throat infection.

Little Mix, a British four-piece girl group known earlier in the show as Rhythmix, was the first group to win the series. The group consisting of members Leigh-Anne Pinnock, Jesy Nelson, Perrie Edwards, and Jade Thirlwall, all auditioned as solo artists before being put together as a group by the judges. They went on to become the first girl group to make it past week seven of the live shows, the first girl group to reach the finals and the first girl group to win the show. The eighth series also won Most Popular Talent Show at the 17th National Television Awards on 25 January 2012.

== Judges, Presenters and Other Personnel ==
Judges and Presenter(s) for The X Factor Series 8

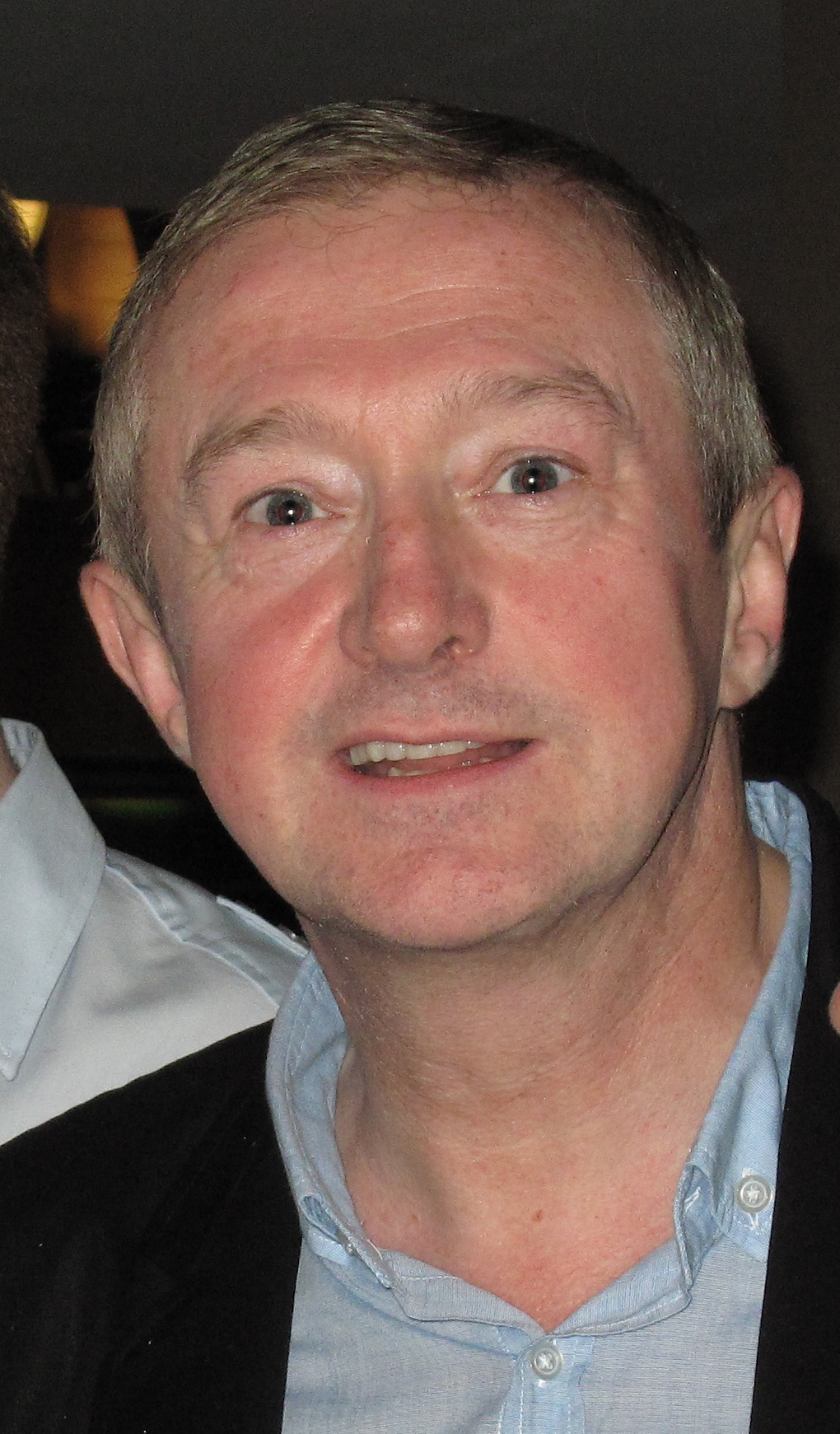
Louis Walsh

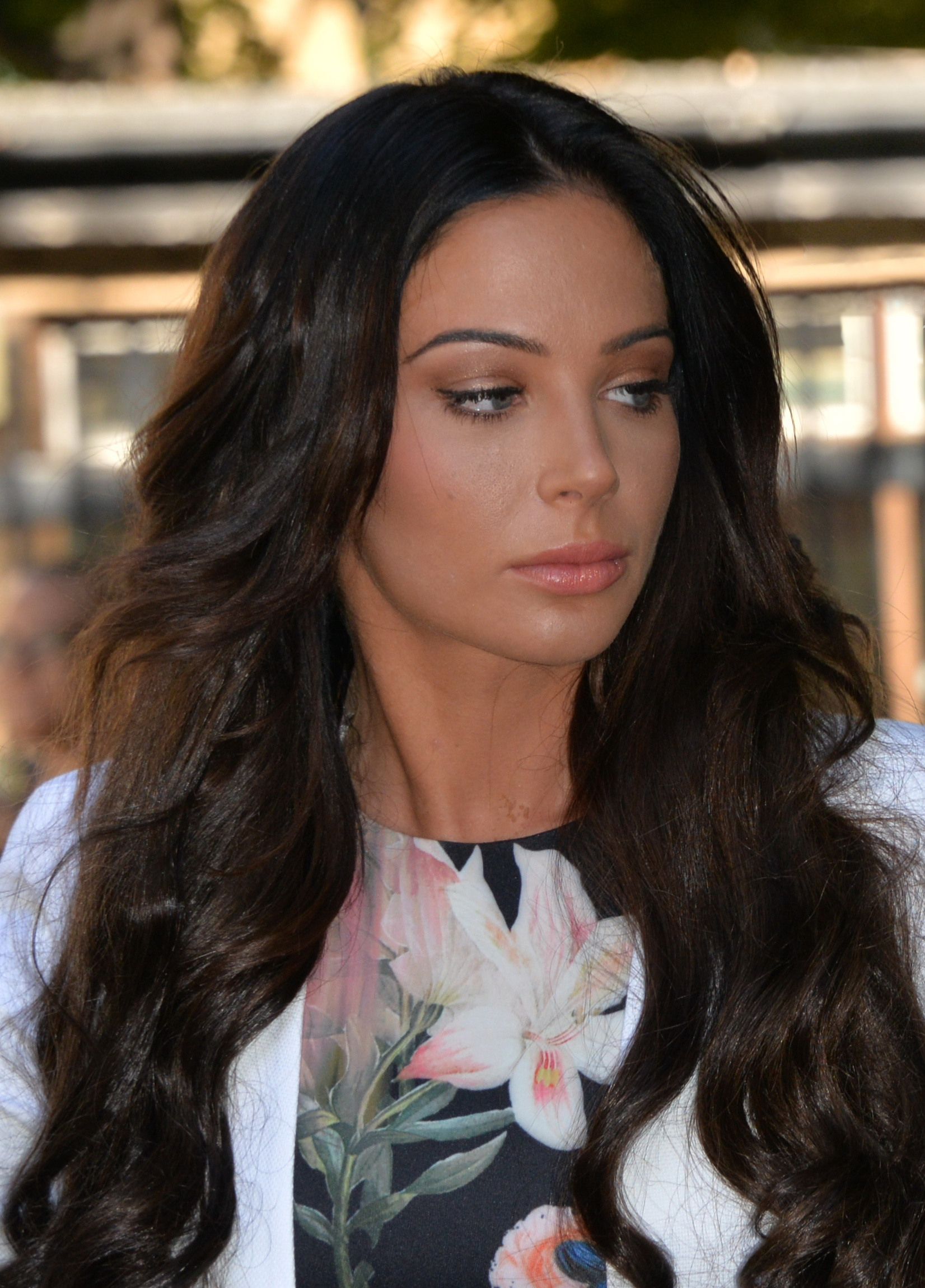
Tulisa

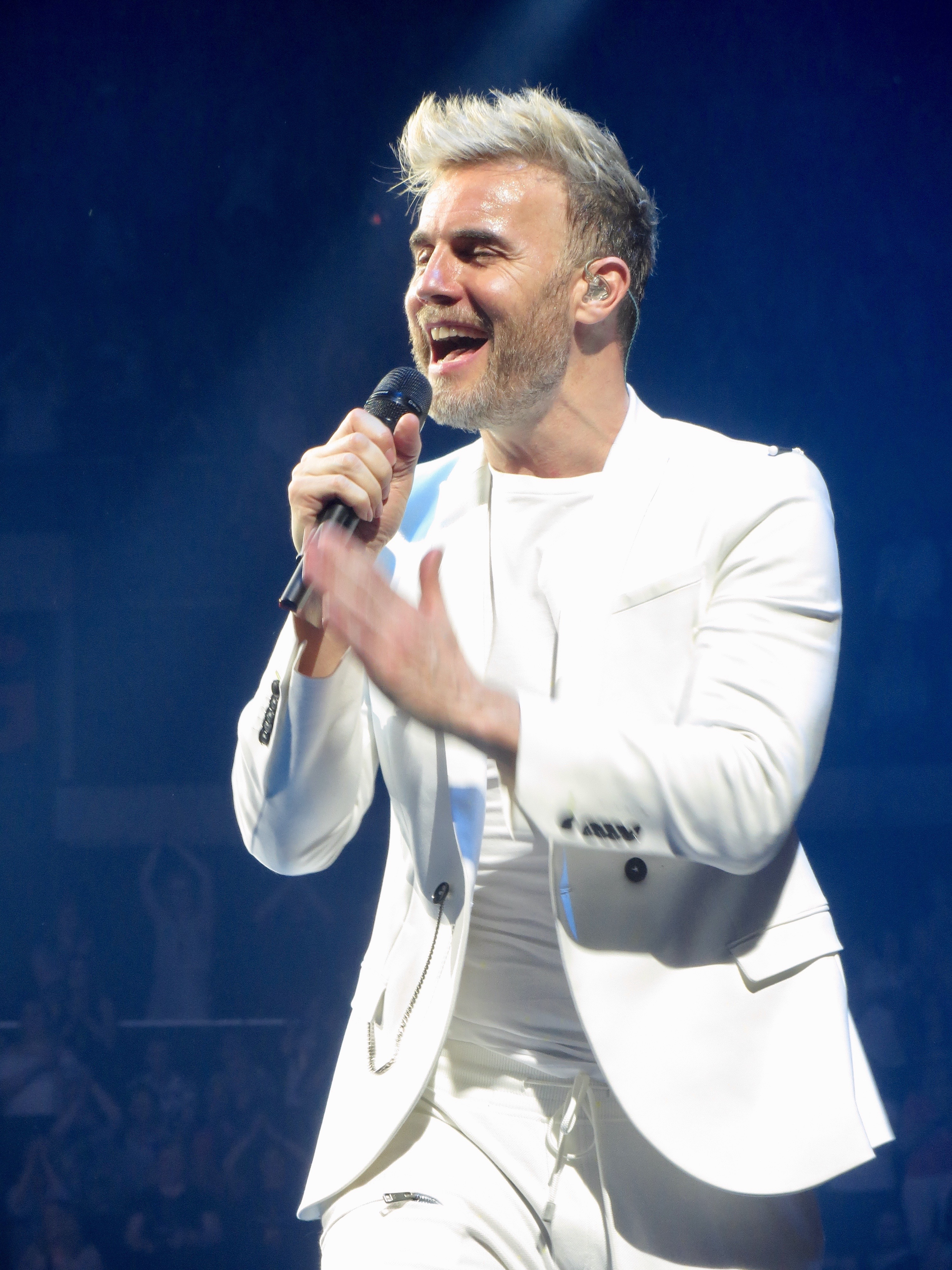
Gary Barlow

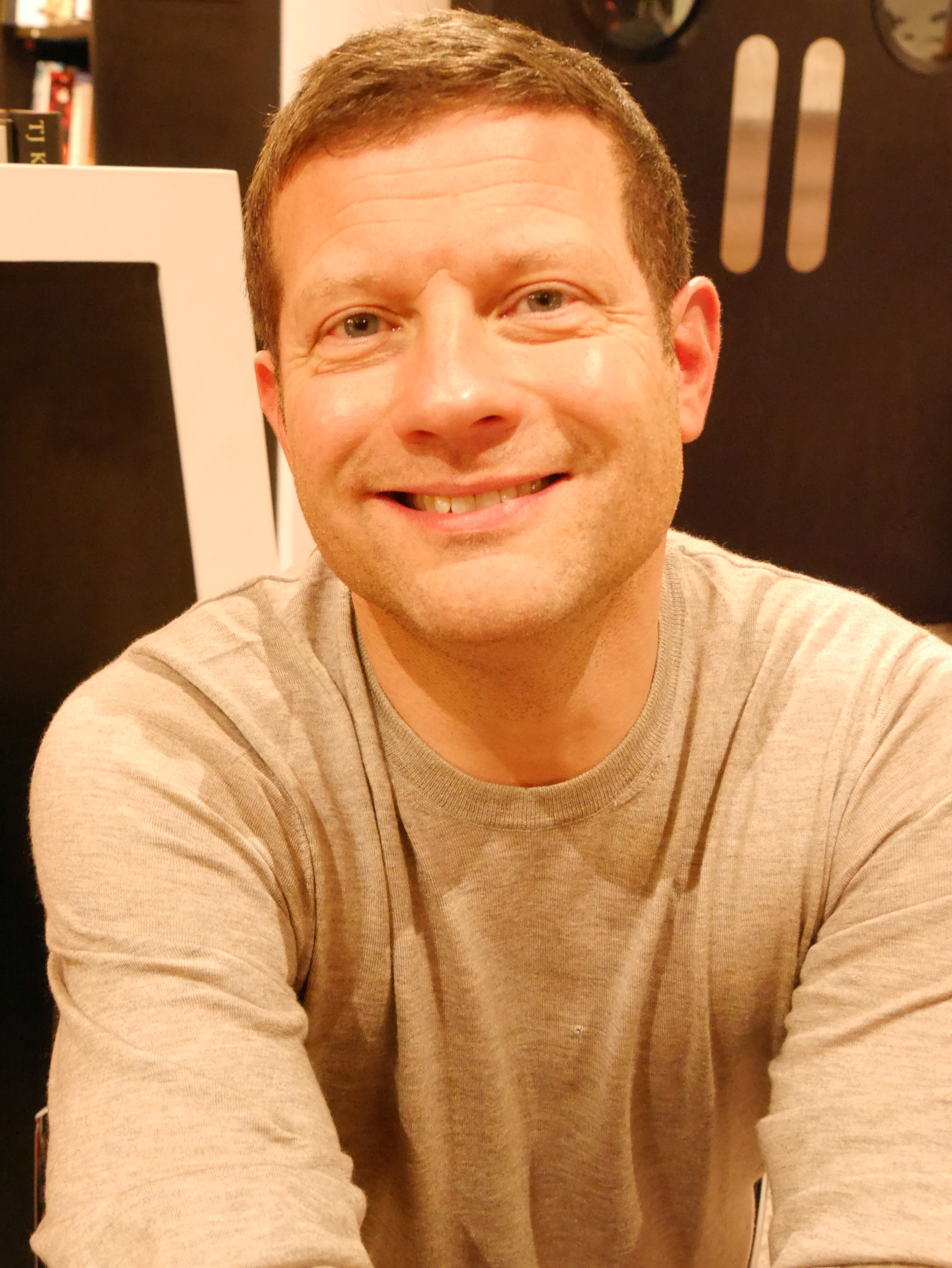
Dermot O'Leary (ITV1)

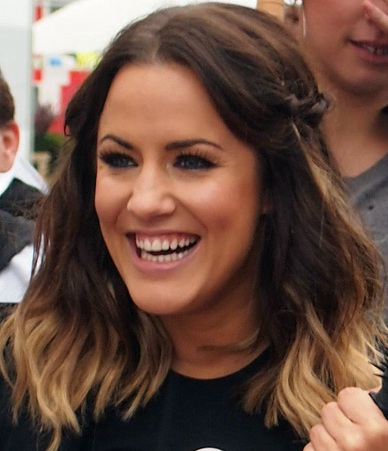
Caroline Flack (ITV2)

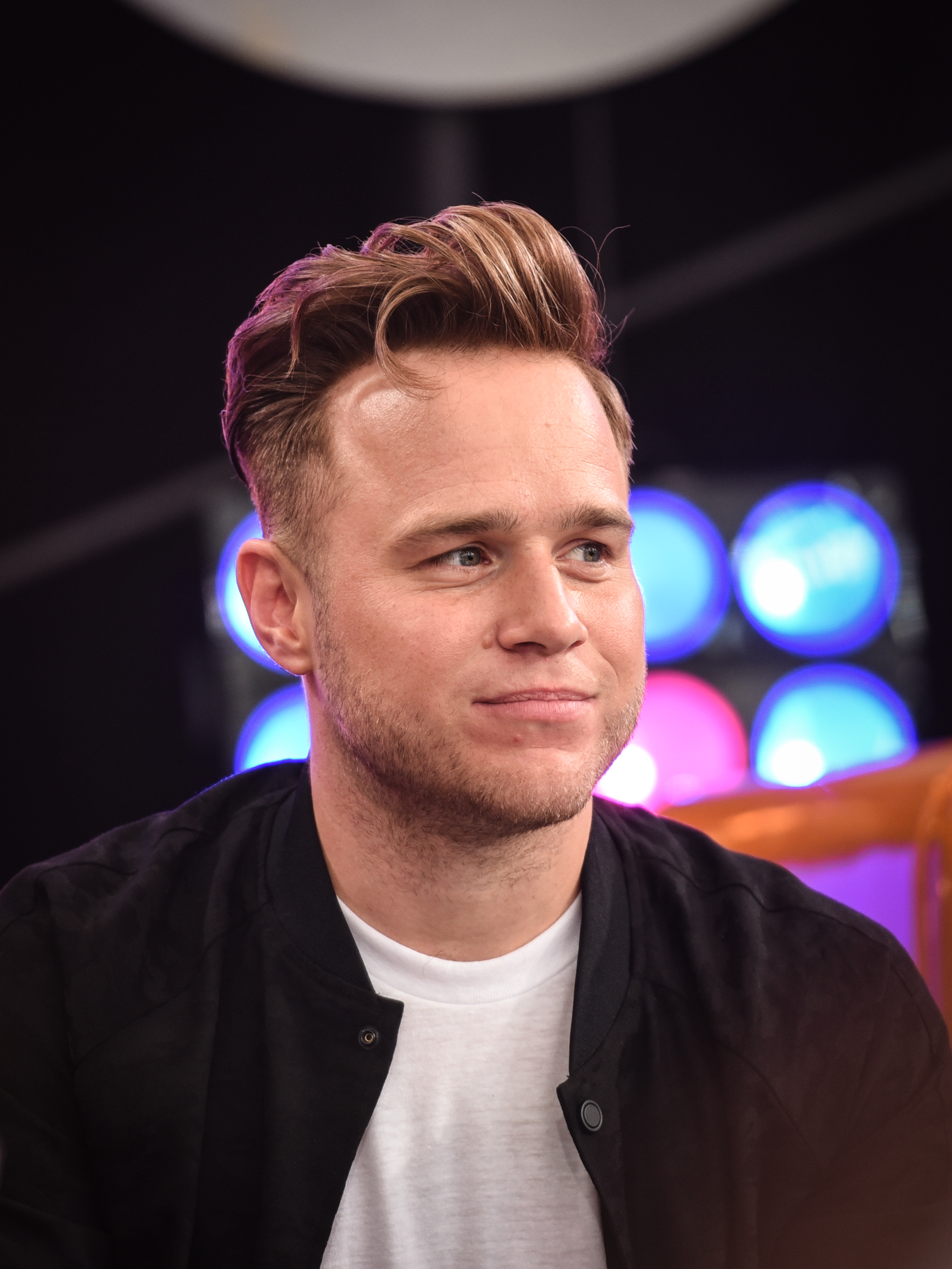
Olly Murs (ITV2)

On 5 May 2011, it was announced that Simon Cowell and Cheryl Cole would not return as judges for the eighth series to work on the first season of The X Factor USA. On 14 May 2011, Dannii Minogue announced that she would not be returning either, due to a clash with Australia's Got Talent, another show for which she judges. Of her decision, Minogue said, "During discussions for me to return to The X Factor it became clear that unfortunately, this year, The X Factor audition dates in the UK clash with the live shows of Australia's Got Talent during June and July. For this reason I am unable to return".

After Cowell and Cole announced their departures, a number of celebrities were linked to the judging role including Frankie Sandford, Alesha Dixon, Lily Allen, Mel B, Ozzy Osbourne (husband of former judge Sharon Osbourne and Noel Gallagher. On 9 May 2011, five days before Minogue announced her departure, news broke that Cowell had offered his seat to Gary Barlow of Take That, though his contract was not finalised. Following Minogue's announcement, it was reported that Tulisa from N-Dubz had been in talks with producers to take on a judging role to replace Cole. It was also suggested that Kelly Rowland, formerly of Destiny's Child, was in discussions to take a seat on the judging panel for Minogue's replacement. Although Cole briefly served as a judge on the 2011 USA season panel, she was dropped from the 2011 USA season panel and Cowell gave her the option to return to the 2011 UK series judging panel. However, she later rejected his offer due to her being dropped from the USA show and unwillingness to be a judge on the UK show without Cowell. On 30 May 2011, the judging line-up was confirmed as Louis Walsh, Barlow, Tulisa and Rowland. Barlow said that he was "extremely excited" to work on the show, and hoped to find a global superstar. Tulisa hoped to "bring something fresh and new to the panel", promising to speak her mind. Rowland wanted an "opportunity to hear a few diamonds in the rough" and said she would be "sternly honest". In week 4 of the live shows on 29 and 30 October, Rowland was unable to attend due to a throat infection so series 5 winner Alexandra Burke took her place as an extra judge on the panel.

In February 2011, Konnie Huq, who presented spin-off series The Xtra Factor for series 7, was told that her contract would not be renewed. Matt Edmondson, Sandford, Kimberley Walsh, and series 6 contestant Stacey Solomon were all rumoured to be in the running, but it was confirmed on 31 May 2011 that Caroline Flack would co-present The Xtra Factor with series 6 runner-up Olly Murs.

== Selection process ==
=== Applications and auditions ===
Cities that auditions were held in.

The first appeal for applicants for series 8 was broadcast during series 7 on 11 December 2010. For the first time, contestants could upload a video to YouTube. Auditions in front of the judges for series 8 took place in Cardiff, London, Glasgow, Liverpool, Birmingham and Manchester. It was the first time auditions had taken place in Liverpool, and the city replaced Dublin, where auditions were held in 2010.

The auditions started in Birmingham's LG Arena on 1 and 2 June. They then took place in Glasgow's SEC Centre on 6 June and continued in Manchester's Event City on 12, 13 and 14 June. More auditions took place at Cardiff's International Arena on 29 June, and at London's O2 on 6, 7 and 8 July, and finished in Liverpool's Echo Arena on 13 and 14 July. The Manchester auditions were postponed from 18 to 20 May.

London and Birmingham auditions were broadcast during the first episode on 20 August 2011. More of the London auditions, as well as the Liverpool and Manchester auditions, aired on 27 August 2011. On 3 September, the Glasgow auditions and more from London were shown. More auditions from Manchester, Birmingham and London were broadcast during the 10 September episode. More from London, plus the Manchester and Glasgow auditions were broadcast in the 11 September episode. The 17 September episode showed more auditions from Liverpool, Cardiff, London, Glasgow and Manchester. The final auditions aired on 18 September, and featured auditions from Liverpool, London and Cardiff.

Summary of judges' auditions
City	Date(s)	Venue	Changes to the judging line-up
Birmingham	1–2 June 2011	LG Arena	—N/a
Glasgow	6 June 2011	SEC Centre	—N/a
Manchester	12–14 June 2011	EventCity	—N/a
Cardiff	29 June 2011	International Arena	—N/a
London	6–8 July 2011	The O_{2} Arena	Gary Barlow absent (some auditions)
Liverpool	13–14 July 2011	Echo Arena	—N/a

=== Bootcamp ===
Bootcamp started on 18 August 2011. The first episode of bootcamp was broadcast on 24 September 2011. It showed 191 acts attending a pre-bootcamp party at The Selsdon Park Hotel in Croydon, while the judges reviewed their auditions to see if there were some acts they wanted to cut before bootcamp started. They cut 39 acts, leaving 152. The acts were split into 30 groups in which to perform at Wembley Arena, and each group was given one of six songs by the judges: "You've Got the Love", "Breakeven", "Price Tag", "Born This Way", "Forget You" or "Firework". The judges then went on to cut over 80 acts, but called back some soloists, who were asked if they were interested in being in a group. All agreed and were workshopped to see which singers would work well together. They formed six new groups: Nu Vibe, Faux Pas, The Lovettes, The Risk, Misfits and Orion. The second episode was broadcast on 25 September 2011. In that episode, the 61 remaining acts including the new groups were then given the task of learning one song, 'making it their own' and performing it in front of a live audience, the second time bootcamp was open to an audience (the first was in 2009). The judges then chose the final 32 acts for judges' houses, based on these performances. However, they chose only 31 acts, including three of the new groups, and the final group, four-piece girl group Rhythmix (later known in the series as Little Mix), was made from two members each from Faux Pas and Orion.

=== Judges' houses ===
Judges' houses, the final part of the selection process, was filmed in September. Judges were given their categories in late August. Barlow mentored the Boys, Rowland the Girls, Walsh the Over 25s, and Tulisa the Groups. Robbie Williams joined Barlow in Los Angeles, Jennifer Hudson assisted Rowland in Miami, Walsh was accompanied by Sinitta in Barcelona, and Tulisa received help from Jessie J in Mykonos. At judges' houses each act performed two songs for their mentor and his/her guest judge, although only one song was mentioned and shown on the main show, with the other song shown on The Xtra Factor instead.

Sian Phillips was originally selected for the judges' houses, but due to visa issues, she was unable to travel to Miami and was thus replaced by Sarah Watson in the Girls category.

Judges Houses Performances

- Act in bold advanced

Groups:

- The Keys: "Best Thing I Never Had"
- The Estrelles: "Love the Way You Lie"
- Girl v Boy: "Use Somebody"
- The Lovettes:"Forever Is Over"
- **The Risk: "No Air"**
- **2 Shoes: "Tik Tok"**
- **Nu Vibe: "Written in the Stars"**
- **Rhythmix: "Big Girls Don't Cry"**

Girls:

- **Amelia: "E.T."**
- Jade: "I Can't Make You Love Me"
- **Sophie: "He Won't Go"**
- Sarah: "Knock You Down"
- Melanie: "Grenade"
- Holly: "For the First Time"
- **Misha: "Fly"**
- **Janet: "Beautiful"**

Over 25s

- **Johnny: "Love Is a Losing Game"**
- **Sami: "Empire State of Mind (Part II) Broken Down"**
- Terry: "Handbags & Gladrags"
- Carolynne: "Need You Now"
- Joseph: "Just the Way You Are"
- Goldie: "On the Floor"
- **Jonjo: "Don't You Remember?"**
- **Kitty: "Beautiful Disaster"**

Boys:

- **Frankie: "What's My Name?"**
- John: "Promise This"
- Joe: "Knockin' on Heaven's Door"
- **James: "Skinny Love"**
- Max: "The Only Exception"
- Luke: "Impossible"
- **Marcus: "One Big Family"**
- **Craig: "Halo"**

Summary of judges' houses
Judge	Category	Location	Assistant	Acts Eliminated
Gary Barlow	Boys	Los Angeles	Robbie Williams	Joe Cox, Luke Lucas, Max Vickers, John Wilding
Tulisa	Groups	Mykonos	Jessie J	Girl v Boy, The Estrelles, The Keys, The Lovettes
Kelly Rowland	Girls	Miami	Jennifer Hudson	Melanie McCabe, Holly Repton, Jade Richards, Sarah Watson
Louis Walsh	Over 25s	Barcelona	Sinitta	Sami Brookes, Joseph Gilligan, Carolynne Poole, Terry Winstanley

Tulisa appeared to eliminate both The Risk and The Keys at the end of the judges' houses stage, only to later call back three members of The Risk and one member of The Keys to form a new supergroup under the former group's name.

Goldie Cheung was initially put through to the finals by Walsh, but pulled out of the competition at the end of the judges' houses stage, stating that she did not want to be away from her family. Sami Brookes, who had initially not made it through, took her place in the live shows.

== Acts ==
Key:

– Winner
– Runner-Up
– Ejected

Act	Age(s)	Hometown	Category (mentor)	Result
Little Mix	18–20	Various	Groups (Tulisa)	Winner
Marcus Collins	23	Liverpool	Boys (Barlow)	Runner-Up
Amelia Lily	17	Nunthorpe , Middlesbrough	Girls (Rowland)	3rd Place
Misha B	19	Manchester	Girls (Rowland)	4th Place
Janet Devlin	17	Gortin, Northern Ireland	Girls (Rowland)	5th Place
Craig Colton	23	Kirkby	Boys (Barlow)	6th Place
Kitty Brucknell	26	Cheltenham	Over 25s (Walsh)	7th Place
Frankie Cocozza	18	Brighton	Boys (Barlow)	8th Place
Johnny Robinson	46	Harrow	Over 25s (Walsh)	9th Place
The Risk	19–25	Various	Groups (Tulisa)	10th Place
Sophie Habibis	20	London	Girls (Rowland)	11th Place
Sami Brookes	31	Rhyl	Over 25s (Walsh)	12th Place
Nu Vibe	16–19	Various	Groups (Tulisa)	13th Place
2 Shoes	21–23	Brentwood, Essex	Groups (Tulisa)	14th Place
James Michael	20	Widnes	Boys (Barlow)	15th Place
Jonjo Kerr	27	Chorley	Over 25s (Walsh)	16th Place

== Live shows ==
The live shows began on 8 October. Each week, the contestants' performances took place on Saturday and the results were announced on Sunday. As with previous series, each live show had a different theme. The results show often featured a group performance by the remaining contestants and guest live performances.

The first live results show included live performances from series 7 winner Matt Cardle and Cee Lo Green, while Katy Perry and The Wanted performed on the second results show. On the third results show, Bruno Mars, Professor Green featuring Emeli Sandé and Kelly Clarkson performed. Series 7 contestant Cher Lloyd and The X Factor USA judge Nicole Scherzinger performed on the fourth live result show. Series 5 runners up JLS and Florence and the Machine performed on the fifth live results show, while Lady Gaga and series 7 contestants One Direction performed on the sixth. The seventh live show featured performances from Rihanna and series 7 runner-up Rebecca Ferguson,. The eighth live results show included performances from former contestant and The Xtra Factor host Olly Murs featuring The Muppets, and Jessie J. JLS and One Direction also appeared alongside the top 16 contestants to perform this year's charity single, "Wishing on a Star". The semi-final live result show featured performances from Justin Bieber and The X Factor judge Rowland. The live final featured performances from Coldplay, JLS, Leona Lewis, Michael Bublé and One Direction.

For the live shows, The X Factor received new graphics and theme music similar to those already introduced on The X Factor USA. Voting by text message, which had been absent since 2007, was reintroduced for this series in addition to the premium rate telephone vote, but was not available during the final.

During the fourth week of the live shows, it was announced that Rowland was unable to travel back from Los Angeles due to a throat infection. During the week, it was announced that Burke would replace her as a judge on the show. After Burke accepted the role as guest judge, she became the first X Factor contestant to return to the show as a judge. It was reported on 28 June 2011 that the final would take place on 10 and 11 December 2011 at Wembley Arena instead of the usual Fountain Studios.

On 26 October 2011, Rhythmix announced that they would change their name due to pressure from a children's music charity of the same name, after the programme tried to trademark "Rhythmix" in Europe. It was reported that the group decided to make the change, despite no legal reason to do so, to avoid any difficulties for the charity. The name was subsequently changed to Little Mix.

On 28 October 2011, Ashley Baptiste decided to leave The Risk. In an interview on the official website, he explained "I don't believe my future lies in a boyband and it's not fair on [the other members] Charlie, Derry and Andy to remain in the band when I am not truly committed to it for the long term. I believe The Risk can win The X Factor and I'm backing them all the way. I count them as my friends so I know we'll stay in touch." He was replaced by Ashford Campbell, who was a member of Nu Vibe, another manufactured boyband who had already previously been eliminated.

On 8 November 2011, Frankie Cocozza was ejected from the competition, saying he "no longer [deserved his] place in the show", having broken competition rules. As a result, it was announced that the four contestants eliminated by their mentors in week 1; 2 Shoes, Amelia Lily, James Michael and Jonjo Kerr; would be given the chance to face a public vote, with the winner of the vote being reinstated in the competition. Amelia Lily won the public vote with 48% of the overall total and replaced Cocozza in the competition.

=== Results summary ===
Colour key

Act in Boys

Act in Girls

Act in Over 25s

Act in Groups

–	Act did not face the public vote
–	Act did not face the public vote but was eliminated by their mentor
–	Act was in the bottom two/three and had to sing again in the final showdown
–	Act was in the bottom three but received the fewest votes and was immediately eliminated
–	Act received the fewest public votes and was immediately eliminated (no final showdown)
–	Act received the most public votes
–	Act was ejected from the competition without singing or facing the public vote

Weekly results per act
Act	Week 1	Week 2	Week 3	Week 4	Week 5	Week 6		Week 7	Quarter-Final	Semi-Final	Final	
Act	Week 1	Week 2	Week 3	Week 4	Week 5	Return Vote^{4}	Elimination Vote	Week 7	Quarter-Final	Semi-Final	Saturday Vote	Sunday Vote
Little Mix	Saved	4th 8.7%	6th 6.0%	2nd 13.7%	4th 11.9%	N/A	3rd 15.3%	1st 26.1%	2nd 22.4%	1st 34.4%	1st 39.0%	Winner; 48.3%^{5}
Marcus Collins	Saved	7th 6.8%	4th 11.2%	6th 10.1%	2nd 16.0%	N/A	4th 12.9%	4th 14.4%	3rd 21.0%	2nd 24.0%	2nd 34.5%	Runner-Up; 42.8%^{5}
Amelia Lily	Eliminated	Eliminated (week 1)				1st 48.8%	1st 27.4%	5th 11.3%	1st 23.8%	3rd 21.4%	3rd 26.5%	Eliminated (final)
Misha B	Saved	5th 7.8%	3rd 11.8%	10th 5.1%	3rd 12.2%	N/A	7th 8.0%	2nd 22.5%	5th 14.5%	4th 20.2%	Eliminated (semi-final)	
Janet Devlin	Saved	1st 23.6%	1st 17.2%	1st 14.7%	1st 18.0%	N/A	2nd 17.4%	3rd 14.8%	4th 18.3%	Eliminated (quarter-final)		
Craig Colton	Saved	6th 6.9%	8th 6.0%	3rd 13.0%	5th 10.1%	N/A	5th 10.6%	6th 10.9%	Eliminated (week 7)			
Kitty Brucknell	Saved	10th 5.9%	11th 5.0%	4th 12.9%	8th 7.6%	N/A	6th 8.4%	Eliminated (week 6)				
Frankie Cocozza	Saved	11th 5.2%	7th 6.0%	8th 5.7%	6th 8.7%	Ejected (week 6)						
Johnny Robinson	Saved	8th 6.5%	2nd 17.1%	5th 12.2%	7th 8.3%	Eliminated (week 5)						
The Risk	Saved	2nd 10.9%	5th 8.3%	7th 7.2%	9th 7.2%	Eliminated (week 5)						
Sophie Habibis	Saved	3rd 8.9%	9th 5.8%	9th 5.4%	Eliminated (week 4)							
Sami Brookes	Saved	9th 6.2%	10th 5.6%	Eliminated (week 3)								
Nu Vibe	Saved	12th 2.6%	Eliminated (week 2)									
2 Shoes	Eliminated	Eliminated (week 1)				4th 11.3%	Not Returned (week 6)					
James Michael	Eliminated	Eliminated (week 1)				2nd 26.7%	Not Returned (week 6)					
Jonjo Kerr	Eliminated	Eliminated (week 1)				3rd 13.2%	Not Returned (week 6)					
Final Showdown	None^{1}	Cocozza, Nu Vibe	Brookes, Brucknell	Habibis, Misha B	Brucknell, Robinson	—N/a^{4}	Brucknell, Misha B	Colton, Lily	Devlin, Misha B	No final showdown or judges' votes: results were based on public votes alone		
Judges voted to	Send Through	Eliminate				—N/a^{4}	Eliminate			No final showdown or judges' votes: results were based on public votes alone		
Walsh's vote (Over 25s)	Brookes, Brucknell, Robinson	Nu Vibe	Brookes	Habibis	Robinson	—N/a^{4}	Misha B	Colton	Devlin	No final showdown or judges' votes: results were based on public votes alone		
Tulisa's vote (Groups)	Little Mix, The Risk, Nu Vibe	Cocozza	Brucknell	Habibis	Robinson	—N/a^{4}	Brucknell	Lily	Devlin	No final showdown or judges' votes: results were based on public votes alone		
Rowland's vote (Girls)	Devlin, Misha B, Habibis	Nu Vibe	Brookes	Habibis^{2}	Robinson	—N/a^{4}	Brucknell	Colton	None (abstained)	No final showdown or judges' votes: results were based on public votes alone		
Barlow's vote (Boys)	Collins, Colton, Cocozza	Nu Vibe	Brookes	—N/a^{3}	—N/a^{3}	—N/a^{4}	Brucknell	Lily	—N/a^{3}	No final showdown or judges' votes: results were based on public votes alone		
Eliminated	Jonjo Kerr by Walsh	Nu Vibe; 3 of 4 votes Majority	Sami Brookes; 3 of 4 votes Majority	Sophie Habibis; 3 of 3 votes Majority	The Risk; 7.2% to save	—N/a^{4}	Kitty Brucknell; 3 of 4 votes Majority	Craig Colton; 2 of 4 votes Deadlock	Janet Devlin; 2 of 2 votes Majority	Misha B 20.2% to save	Amelia Lily; 26.5% to save	Marcus Collins; 42.8% to win
Eliminated	James Michael by Barlow	Nu Vibe; 3 of 4 votes Majority	Sami Brookes; 3 of 4 votes Majority	Sophie Habibis; 3 of 3 votes Majority	The Risk; 7.2% to save	—N/a^{4}	Kitty Brucknell; 3 of 4 votes Majority	Craig Colton; 2 of 4 votes Deadlock	Janet Devlin; 2 of 2 votes Majority	Misha B 20.2% to save	Amelia Lily; 26.5% to save	Marcus Collins; 42.8% to win
Eliminated	2 Shoes by Tulisa	Nu Vibe; 3 of 4 votes Majority	Sami Brookes; 3 of 4 votes Majority	Sophie Habibis; 3 of 3 votes Majority	Johnny Robinson; 3 of 3 votes Majority	—N/a^{4}	Kitty Brucknell; 3 of 4 votes Majority	Craig Colton; 2 of 4 votes Deadlock	Janet Devlin; 2 of 2 votes Majority	Misha B 20.2% to save	Amelia Lily; 26.5% to save	Marcus Collins; 42.8% to win
Eliminated	Amelia Lily by Rowland	Nu Vibe; 3 of 4 votes Majority	Sami Brookes; 3 of 4 votes Majority	Sophie Habibis; 3 of 3 votes Majority	Johnny Robinson; 3 of 3 votes Majority	—N/a^{4}	Kitty Brucknell; 3 of 4 votes Majority	Craig Colton; 2 of 4 votes Deadlock	Janet Devlin; 2 of 2 votes Majority	Misha B 20.2% to save	Amelia Lily; 26.5% to save	Marcus Collins; 42.8% to win
Reference(s)												

- ^1 There was no public vote in the first week and no final showdown. Each judge was required to eliminate one of their own acts.
- ^2 Rowland was not present due to illness but voted via telephone link from Los Angeles.
- ^3 Barlow was not required to vote as there was already a majority. However, he stated that he would have voted to eliminate Sophie Habibis in week 4, Johnny Robinson in week 5 and Janet Devlin in the quarter-final.
- ^4 Following Frankie Cocozza's ejection from the competition, one of the four acts who were eliminated in the first week of the competition by the judges (2 Shoes, Amelia Lily, James Michael, or Jonjo Kerr) were given the chance to return to and replace Cocozza in the competition through a public vote. The winner of the public vote was Amelia Lily with 48.8%.
- ^5 The voting percentages in the final for the Sunday Vote do not add up to 100%, owing to the freezing of votes. Amelia Lily received 8.9% of the final vote.

=== Live show details ===
==== Week 1 (8/9 October) ====
- Theme: Songs by British and American artists (billed as "Britain vs. America")
- Musical guests: Matt Cardle ("Run for Your Life") and Cee Lo Green ("Satisfied/Forget You")
- Best bits songs: "Use Somebody" (Jonjo Kerr),"Fix You" (James Michael),"I’ll Stand by You" (2 Shoes) & "The Silence" (Amelia Lily)

Acts' performances on the first live show
Act	Category (mentor)	Order	Song	Country	Result
Amelia Lily	Girls (Rowland)	1	"Billie Jean"	USA	Eliminated
Johnny Robinson	Over 25s (Walsh)	2	"Believe"	USA	Saved
Rhythmix	Groups (Tulisa)	3	"Super Bass"	USA	Saved
Frankie Cocozza	Boys (Barlow)	4	"The A Team"	UK	Saved
Sophie Habibis	Girls (Rowland)	5	"Teenage Dream"	USA	Saved
Jonjo Kerr	Over 25s (Walsh)	6	"You Really Got Me"	UK	Eliminated
2 Shoes	Groups (Tulisa)	7	"Something Kinda Ooooh"	UK	Eliminated
James Michael	Boys (Barlow)	8	"Ticket to Ride"	UK	Eliminated
Misha B	Girls (Rowland)	9	"Rolling in the Deep"	UK	Saved
Nu Vibe	Groups (Tulisa)	10	"Beautiful People"	USA	Saved
Marcus Collins	Boys (Barlow)	11	"Moves like Jagger"	USA	Saved
Sami Brookes	Over 25s (Walsh)	12	"Free"	USA	Saved
The Risk	Groups (Tulisa)	13	"She Said"	UK	Saved
Craig Colton	Boys (Barlow)	14	"Jar of Hearts"	USA	Saved
Kitty Brucknell	Over 25s (Walsh)	15	"Who Wants to Live Forever"	UK	Saved
Janet Devlin	Girls (Rowland)	16	"Fix You"	UK	Saved

- There was no public vote in the first week. Instead, each of the judges selected one of their own acts to eliminate.

Judges' decisions to eliminate

- Walsh: Jonjo Kerr – the decision came down to Jonjo Kerr and Johnny Robinson, and Walsh felt that the public would want to see Robinson more.
- Barlow: James Michael – thought the other three boys gave better performances than Michael.
- Tulisa: 2 Shoes – the decision came down to 2 Shoes and Nu Vibe, and Tulisa decided that Nu Vibe had more potential to improve.
- Rowland: Amelia Lily – the decision came down to Amelia Lily and Sophie Habibis; while Rowland felt that Lily had more of a star quality, she conceded that Habibis had given the better performance.

==== Week 2 (15/16 October) ====
- Theme: "Love and heartbreak"
- Group performance: "Hello"
- Musical guests: The Wanted ("Lightning") and Katy Perry ("The One That Got Away")
- Best bits song: "Gold Forever"

Acts' performances on the second live show
Act	Category (mentor)	Order	Song	Result
Nu Vibe	Groups (Tulisa)	1	"With or Without You"	Bottom Two
Sami Brookes	Over 25s (Walsh)	2	"I Will Always Love You"	Safe
Craig Colton	Boys (Barlow)	3	"Best Thing I Never Had"	Safe
Janet Devlin	Girls (Rowland)	4	"Can't Help Falling in Love"	Safe (Highest Votes)
Frankie Cocozza	Boys (Barlow)	5	"The Scientist"	Bottom Two
Johnny Robinson	Over 25s (Walsh)	6	"Can't Get You Out of My Head"	Safe
Marcus Collins	Boys (Barlow)	7	"Russian Roulette"	Safe
Rhythmix	Groups (Tulisa)	8	"I'm Like a Bird"	Safe
Misha B	Girls (Rowland)	9	"Would I Lie to You?"	Safe
The Risk	Groups (Tulisa)	10	"Just the Way You Are"	Safe
Sophie Habibis	Girls (Rowland)	11	"Wherever You Will Go"	Safe
Kitty Brucknell	Over 25s (Walsh)	12	"It's Oh So Quiet"	Safe
Final showdown details
Nu Vibe	Groups (Tulisa)	1	"Promise This"	Eliminated
Frankie Cocozza	Boys (Barlow)	2	"Red"	Saved

Judges' votes to eliminate

- Barlow: Nu Vibe – gave no reason, though effectively backed his own act, Frankie Cocozza.
- Rowland: Nu Vibe – gave no reason.
- Tulisa: Frankie Cocozza – gave no reason, though effectively backed her own act, Nu Vibe.
- Walsh: Nu Vibe – backed the act he believed could improve the most despite criticizing both performances on Saturday.

==== Week 3 (22/23 October) ====
- Theme: Rock
- Musical guests: Kelly Clarkson ("Mr. Know It All"), Professor Green featuring Emeli Sandé ("Read All About It") and Bruno Mars ("Runaway Baby")
- Best bits song: "One Moment in Time"

Acts' performances on the third live show
Act	Category (mentor)	Order	Song	Rock Artist	Result
Marcus Collins	Boys (Barlow)	1	"Are You Gonna Go My Way"	Lenny Kravitz	Safe
Janet Devlin	Girls (Rowland)	2	"Sweet Child o' Mine"	Guns N' Roses	Safe (Highest Votes)
Sami Brookes	Over 25s (Walsh)	3	"If I Could Turn Back Time"	Cher	Bottom Two
Rhythmix	Groups (Tulisa)	4	"Tik Tok"/"Push It"	Kesha	Safe
Sophie Habibis	Girls (Rowland)	5	"Livin' on a Prayer"	Bon Jovi	Safe
Craig Colton	Boys (Barlow)	6	"Stop Crying Your Heart Out"	Oasis	Safe
Kitty Brucknell	Over 25s (Walsh)	7	"Live and Let Die"	Paul McCartney and Wings	Bottom Two
Frankie Cocozza	Boys (Barlow)	8	"Rocks"	Primal Scream	Safe
The Risk	Groups (Tulisa)	9	"Crazy"	Gnarls Barkley	Safe
Johnny Robinson	Over 25s (Walsh)	10	"I Believe in a Thing Called Love"	The Darkness	Safe
Misha B	Girls (Rowland)	11	"Purple Rain"	Prince	Safe
Final showdown details
Sami Brookes	Over 25s (Walsh)	1	"(You Make Me Feel Like) A Natural Woman"		Eliminated
Kitty Brucknell	Over 25s (Walsh)	2	"The Edge of Glory"		Saved

Judges' votes to eliminate

- Barlow: Sami Brookes – said that both acts were "unbelievable" in the final showdown, but felt that Brucknell was "more exciting" and Brookes was "a little bit dated", despite saying Brookes' voice is "undeniable".
- Rowland: Sami Brookes – gave no reason but later revealed on The Xtra Factor that Brucknell's entertainment was essential for the competition.
- Tulisa: Kitty Brucknell – thought Brookes had a better connection with her.
- Walsh: Sami Brookes – declined to send the result to deadlock and chose to go with his heart; later emphasizing on The Xtra Factor Brucknell's clear passion and commitment to being in the show and to being a recording artist.

However, voting statistics revealed that Brookes received more votes than Brucknell which meant that if Walsh sent the result to deadlock, Brookes would have been saved.

==== Week 4 (29/30 October) ====
- Theme: Halloween
- Group performance: "Bright Lights Bigger City"
- Musical guests: Cher Lloyd ("With Ur Love") and Nicole Scherzinger ("Try with Me")
- Best bits song: "I Will Be"

Rowland did not appear on the judging panel for week 4 due to illness, so series 5 winner Alexandra Burke took her place as an extra judge on the panel. However, Burke did not vote on the results show; instead, Rowland voted via telephone link from Los Angeles. Rhythmix's new name 'Little Mix' took effect from Week 4. Ashley Baptiste from The Risk quit the group so Ashford Campbell who was originally in Nu Vibe (eliminated Week 2) joined The Risk.

Acts' performances on the fourth live show
Act	Category (mentor)	Order	Song	Result
The Risk	Groups (Tulisa)	1	"Thriller"	Safe
Johnny Robinson	Over 25s (Walsh)	2	"That Ole Devil Called Love"	Safe
Sophie Habibis	Girls (Rowland)	3	"Bang Bang (My Baby Shot Me Down)"	Bottom Two
Marcus Collins	Boys (Barlow)	4	"Superstition"/"Need You Tonight"	Safe
Misha B	Girls (Rowland)	5	"Tainted Love"	Bottom Two
Janet Devlin	Girls (Rowland)	6	"Every Breath You Take"	Safe (Highest Votes)
Frankie Cocozza	Boys (Barlow)	7	"Should I Stay or Should I Go"	Safe
Kitty Brucknell	Over 25s (Walsh)	8	"Sweet Dreams (Are Made of This)"	Safe
Little Mix	Groups (Tulisa)	9	"E.T."	Safe
Craig Colton	Boys (Barlow)	10	"Set Fire to the Rain"	Safe
Final showdown details
Sophie Habibis	Girls (Rowland)	1	"Shelter"	Eliminated
Misha B	Girls (Rowland)	2	"Use Somebody"	Saved

Judges' votes to eliminate

- Walsh: Sophie Habibis – said that Misha B was a better performer and has got star quality.
- Tulisa: Sophie Habibis – said she related more to Misha B as an artist.
- Rowland: Sophie Habibis – felt that Misha B wanted it more than Habibis.
- Barlow was not required to vote since there was already a majority, but confirmed he would have voted to eliminate Habibis.

However, voting statistics revealed that Habibis received more votes than Misha B which meant that if the result went to deadlock, Habibis would have been saved.

==== Week 5 (5/6 November) ====
- Theme: Club classics
- Group performance: "Price Tag"
- Musical guests : JLS ("Take a Chance on Me") and Florence and the Machine ("Shake It Out")
- Best bits songs: "Safe" (The Risk) & "Love Is a Losing Game" (Johnny Robinson)

In a double elimination special, two acts were eliminated from the series fifth results show. The three acts with the fewest public votes were announced as the bottom three and then the act with the fewest votes was automatically eliminated. The remaining two acts then performed in the final showdown for the judges' votes. The Risk was eliminated as the act with the fewest public votes.

Acts' performances on the fifth live show
Act	Category (mentor)	Order	Song	Result
Johnny Robinson	Over 25s (Walsh)	1	"Hung Up"/"You Spin Me Round (Like a Record)"	Bottom Three
Janet Devlin	Girls (Rowland)	2	"I Want You Back"	Safe (Highest Votes)
Craig Colton	Boys (Barlow)	3	"Heaven"	Safe
The Risk	Groups (Tulisa)	4	"A Night to Remember"	Eliminated
Marcus Collins	Boys (Barlow)	5	"Reet Petite"	Safe
Kitty Brucknell	Over 25s (Walsh)	6	"Like a Prayer"	Bottom Three
Frankie Cocozza	Boys (Barlow)	7	"I Gotta Feeling"	Safe
Misha B	Girls (Rowland)	8	"Proud Mary"	Safe
Little Mix	Groups (Tulisa)	9	"Don't Stop the Music"	Safe
Final showdown details
Johnny Robinson	Over 25s (Walsh)	1	"Unchained Melody"	Eliminated
Kitty Brucknell	Over 25s (Walsh)	2	"Beautiful Disaster"	Saved

Judges' votes to eliminate

- Walsh: Johnny Robinson – said that Brucknell was more likely to succeed in the music industry.
- Tulisa: Johnny Robinson – agreed with Walsh, and added that she looked forward to seeing Brucknell more every week.
- Rowland: Johnny Robinson – also agreed with Walsh, and added that she felt Brucknell would "provide" the show with who she wanted to be as an artist.
- Barlow was not required to vote since there was already a majority, but confirmed he would have voted to eliminate Robinson.

However, voting statistics revealed that Robinson received more votes than Brucknell which meant that if the result went to deadlock, Robinson would have been saved.

==== Week 6 (12/13 November) ====
- Theme: Songs by Lady Gaga or Queen (billed as "Lady Gaga vs. Queen")
- Group performance: "Walking on Sunshine"
- Musical guests: One Direction ("Gotta Be You") and Lady Gaga ("Marry the Night")
- Best bits song: "Perfect"

On 8 November 2011, Frankie Cocozza was ejected from the competition. The four acts that did not face the public vote in week 1 and were eliminated by their mentors—Amelia Lily, James Michael, Jonjo Kerr, and 2 Shoes—faced the public vote and the act with the most votes would replace Cocozza. The winner of the vote was announced as Amelia Lily with 48.8% of the public vote.

Acts' performances on the sixth live show
Act	Category (mentor)	Order	Song	Musician	Result
Kitty Brucknell	Over 25s (Walsh)	1	"Don't Stop Me Now"	Queen	Bottom Two
Craig Colton	Boys (Barlow)	2	"Paparazzi"	Lady Gaga	Safe
Little Mix	Groups (Tulisa)	3	"Radio Ga Ga"/"Telephone"	Queen/Lady Gaga	Safe
Janet Devlin	Girls (Rowland)	4	"Somebody to Love"	Queen	Safe
Marcus Collins	Boys (Barlow)	5	"Another One Bites the Dust"	Queen	Safe
Misha B	Girls (Rowland)	6	"Born This Way"	Lady Gaga	Bottom Two
Amelia Lily	Girls (Rowland)	7	"The Show Must Go On"	Queen	Safe (Highest Votes)
Final showdown details
Kitty Brucknell	Over 25s (Walsh)	1	"Over the Rainbow"		Eliminated
Misha B	Girls (Rowland)	2	"Who You Are"		Saved

Judges' votes to eliminate

- Walsh: Misha B – gave no reason but effectively backed his own act, Kitty Brucknell.
- Tulisa: Kitty Brucknell – said that after the show she would buy Misha B's album.
- Rowland: Kitty Brucknell – backed her own act, Misha B, who she felt had more potential in the competition.
- Barlow: Kitty Brucknell – said that Misha B had more potential and he thought that Brucknell was not connecting with the audience since this was her third time in the bottom two despite praising both final showdown performances and stating how Misha B and Brucknell were the most committed contestants and wanted to stay in the competition the most of all the remaining acts.

However, voting statistics revealed that Brucknell received more votes than Misha B which meant that if the result went to deadlock, Brucknell would have been saved.

==== Week 7 (19/20 November) ====
- Theme: Songs from films (billed as "movie week")
- Group performance: "When You're Gone" (with Bryan Adams)
- Musical guests: Rebecca Ferguson ("Nothing's Real but Love") and Rihanna ("We Found Love")
- Best Bits song: "Patience"

Acts' performances on the seventh live show
Act	Category (mentor)	Order	Song	Film	Result
Craig Colton	Boys (Barlow)	1	"Licence to Kill"	Licence to Kill	Bottom Two
Janet Devlin	Girls (Rowland)	2	"Kiss Me"	How to Lose a Guy in 10 Days	Safe
Amelia Lily	Girls (Rowland)	3	"Think"	Bridget Jones: The Edge of Reason	Bottom Two
Misha B	Girls (Rowland)	4	"I Have Nothing"	The Bodyguard	Safe
Little Mix	Groups (Tulisa)	5	"Don't Let Go (Love)"	Set It Off	Safe (Highest Votes)
Marcus Collins	Boys (Barlow)	6	"(Your Love Keeps Lifting Me) Higher and Higher"	Ghostbusters II	Safe
Final showdown details
Craig Colton	Boys (Barlow)	1	"Will You Still Love Me Tomorrow"		Eliminated
Amelia Lily	Girls (Rowland)	2	"You and I"		Saved

Judges' votes to eliminate

- Barlow: Amelia Lily – backed his own act, Craig Colton, and said that Lily had "shouted her way" through the final showdown.
- Rowland: Craig Colton – backed her own act, Amelia Lily, who she said properly sang her survival song.
- Tulisa: Amelia Lily – said that Colton sang better in the sing off.
- Walsh: Craig Colton – said Lily was "a worldwide ready-made pop star" and had more potential.

With both acts receiving two votes each, the result went to deadlock and reverted to the earlier public vote. Colton was eliminated as the act with the fewest public votes.

==== Week 8: Quarter-Final (26/27 November) ====
- Themes: Guilty pleasures; musical heroes
- Group performance: "Wishing on a Star" (all finalists except Frankie Cocozza, along with JLS and One Direction)
- Musical guests: Olly Murs and The Muppets ("Dance with Me Tonight") and Jessie J ("Who You Are")
- Best bits song: "Your Song"

Starting in the quarter-final, each act performed two songs with voting lines opening after the first round of performances.

Acts' performances in the quarter-final
Act	Category (mentor)	Order	First song	Guilty Pleasure	Order	Second song	Musical Hero(es)	Result
Little Mix	Groups (Tulisa)	1	"Baby"/"Where Did Our Love Go"	Justin Bieber / The Supremes	6	"Beautiful"	Christina Aguilera	Safe
Janet Devlin	Girls (Rowland)	2	"MMMBop"	Hanson	7	"Under the Bridge"	Red Hot Chili Peppers	Bottom Two
Misha B	Girls (Rowland)	3	"Girls Just Want To Have Fun"	Cyndi Lauper	8	"Killing Me Softly with His Song"	Roberta Flack	Bottom Two
Marcus Collins	Boys (Barlow)	4	"I'm Your Man"	Wham!	9	"Lately"	Stevie Wonder	Safe
Amelia Lily	Girls (Rowland)	5	"China in Your Hand"	T'Pau	10	"Since U Been Gone"	Kelly Clarkson	Safe (Highest Votes)
Final showdown details
Janet Devlin	Girls (Rowland)	1	"Chasing Cars"					Eliminated
Misha B	Girls (Rowland)	2	"Out Here on My Own"					Saved

Judges' votes to eliminate

- Walsh: Janet Devlin – based on the performances across the quarter-final.
- Tulisa: Janet Devlin – based on the performances across the quarter-final, and thought Misha B had more long-term potential.
- Rowland abstained from voting as both her acts were in the bottom two, O'Leary warned Rowland this would mean Devlin would be eliminated by default as Walsh and Tulisa voted against her, but Rowland still declined to vote.
- Barlow was not required to vote since there was already a majority, but confirmed he would have voted to eliminate Devlin.

However, voting statistics revealed that Devlin received more votes than Misha B which meant that if the result went to deadlock, Devlin would have advanced to the semi-final and Misha B would have been eliminated.

==== Week 9: Semi-Final (3/4 December) ====
- Themes: Motown; "songs to get you to the final" (no theme)
- Group performance: "Hold On"
- Musical guests: Justin Bieber ("Mistletoe") and Kelly Rowland ("When Love Takes Over" / "Down for Whatever" / "Commander")
- Best bits song: "Set Fire to the Rain"

Acts' performances in the semi-final
Act	Category (mentor)	Order	First song	Motown Artist	Order	Second song	Result
Misha B	Girls (Rowland)	1	"Dancing in the Street"	Martha and the Vandellas	5	"Perfect"	Eliminated
Amelia Lily	Girls (Rowland)	2	"Ain't No Mountain High Enough"	Marvin Gaye & Tammi Terrell	6	"I'm with You"	Safe
Little Mix	Groups (Tulisa)	3	"You Keep Me Hangin' On"	The Supremes	8	"If I Were a Boy"	Safe (Highest Votes)
Marcus Collins	Boys (Barlow)	4	"My Girl"	The Temptations	7	"Can You Feel It"	Safe

The semi-final did not feature a final showdown and instead the act with the fewest public votes, Misha B, was automatically eliminated. After her elimination, Misha B reprised her week 6 final showdown performance of "Who You Are" as her exit song.

==== Week 10: Final (10/11 December) ====
The final was held at Wembley Arena and lasted for over four hours, split over Saturday 10 and Sunday 11 December 2011.

10 December

- Themes: No theme; mentor duets
- Group performance: "Greatest Day"
- Musical guests: JLS and One Direction ("She Makes Me Wanna" / "What Makes You Beautiful"), Michael Bublé ("Christmas (Baby Please Come Home)") and Leona Lewis ("Hurt")
- Best bits song: "Chances"

Acts' performances on the Saturday Final
Act	Category (mentor)	Order	First song	Order	Second song (Duet)	Result
Marcus Collins	Boys (Barlow)	1	"Hey Ya!"	4	"She's Always a Woman" (with Gary Barlow)	Safe
Little Mix	Groups (Tulisa)	2	"You Got the Love"	5	"If I Ain't Got You"/"Empire State of Mind" (with Tulisa)	Safe (Highest Votes)
Amelia Lily	Girls (Rowland)	3	"Ain't No Other Man"	6	"River Deep – Mountain High" (with Kelly Rowland)	Eliminated

If Amelia Lily had made the final two, her favourite performance would have been, "The Show Must Go On" from week six, and would have sung "All I Want For Christmas Is You" for her Christmas song, as well as performing "Cannonball".

11 December

- Themes: Favourite performance ("song of the series"); Christmas songs; winner's single
- Group performance: "We Found Love" / "Party Rock Anthem" / "On the Floor" / "Moves Like Jagger" / "The Edge of Glory" (all contestants except Frankie Cocozza who was replaced by Goldie Cheung and David Wilder)
- Musical guests: Westlife ("What About Now") and Coldplay ("Charlie Brown" and "Paradise")
- Best bits songs: "Rule the World" (Marcus Collins) & "I’ll Stand by You" (Little Mix)

Acts' performances on the Sunday Final
Act	Category (mentor)	Order	Favourite song	Order	Christmas song	Order	Third song	Result
Marcus Collins	Boys (Barlow)	1	"(Your Love Keeps Lifting Me) Higher and Higher"	3	"Last Christmas"	5	"Cannonball"	Runner-Up
Little Mix	Groups (Tulisa)	2	"Don't Let Go (Love)"	4	"Silent Night"	6	"Cannonball"	Winner

== Charity single ==
It was announced on 12 October 2011, that the 16 finalists would record a cover version of "Wishing on a Star", released on 20 November in aid of Together for Short Lives, a charity which Cowell said do "amazing work". It is the fourth time finalists have released a charity single. Series 5 contestants JLS and series 7 contestants One Direction also feature on the single.

== Winner's single ==
The winner's single was Damien Rice's "Cannonball". For the first time since series 1, the winner's single was not released in the week of the coveted Christmas number one chart battle. The Official Charts Company announced that the 2011 Christmas number-one would be announced on Christmas Day, meaning releases on 18 December would be new entries in the chart that week. Little Mix's winner's single was released on 14 December, which meant it would have to maintain significant sales numbers in its second week to achieve the Christmas number one. It was announced on 17 November that N-Dubz rapper Fazer would be producing the single.

== Marks and Spencer deal ==
In September 2011, it was announced that Marks & Spencer would be The X Factor's official fashion partner. On 2 October 2011, it was revealed that the 16 finalists would star in the retailer's 2011 Christmas advertisement. It is a one-minute advertisement that premiered during week 5 of the live shows. The finalists recorded a cover of the song "When You Wish upon a Star" to feature in the advert and modelled clothes from the company. The finalists will be paid for the advertisement. After his ejection from the competition, M&S announced that Frankie Cocozza's face would be edited out of the advert, as it wasn't possible to edit his voice from the advert. On 17 November 2011, M&S posted the latest edit of the advert to their official YouTube account, with Cocozza's vocals completely erased.

== Reception ==
=== Ratings ===
Initial viewing figures for the first episode were placed at 11.3 million for ITV1, however, the peak audience was 12.6 million, a match for the highest viewing figures for an X Factor series opener, and almost 5 million more than Doctor Who on BBC One, the second-highest rated programme that night.

Like the previous two series, the show dominated the weekly rankings, taking the top spot for the first three weeks and then the top two for the rest of the series, with the exceptions being the fourth, fifth and sixth live shows, which were beaten into third place by two episodes of Downton Abbey and the launch episode of I'm a Celebrity...Get Me Out of Here!, respectively. Despite a drop in ratings from the year before, it was the third most-watched series in the show's history.

Episode	Air date	Official ITV1 rating (millions)	Weekly rank	Share (%)	Official ITV1 HD rating (millions)	Official ITV1+1 rating (millions)	Total ITV1 viewers (millions)
Auditions 1	20 August	11.05	1	45.7	1.13	0.53	12.71
Auditions 2	27 August	10.63	1	42.8	1.02	0.48	12.13
Auditions 3	3 September	10.96	1	43.4	1.00	0.60	12.56
Auditions 4	10 September	10.98	1	43.6	1.06	0.53	12.57
Auditions 5	11 September	10.52	2	37.8	1.10	0.53	12.15
Auditions 6	17 September	11.16	2	44.5	1.17	0.33	12.66
Auditions 7	18 September	11.23	1	42.2	1.17	0.34	12.74
Bootcamp 1	24 September	10.64	2	43.0	1.05	0.39	12.08
Bootcamp 2	25 September	11.12	1	38.7	1.06	0.57	12.75
Judges' houses 1	1 October	10.13	2	42.0	1.11	0.67	11.91
Judges' houses 2	2 October	11.74	1	42.5	1.18	0.46	13.38
Live show 1	8 October	10.89	2	40.3	1.16	0.53	12.58
Live results 1	9 October	11.34	1	41.1	1.27	0.34	12.95
Live show 2	15 October	9.90	2	39.1	1.24	0.47	11.61
Live results 2	16 October	10.84	1	40.5	1.26	0.30	12.40
Live show 3	22 October	9.73	2	38.0	1.33	0.38	11.44
Live results 3	23 October	10.68	1	39.8	1.21	—N/a^{1}	11.89
Live show 4	29 October	9.74	3	38.8	1.32	0.33	11.39
Live results 4	30 October	11.44	1	42.0	1.31	0.27	13.02
Live show 5	5 November	9.61	3	40.3	1.36	0.44	11.41
Live results 5	6 November	11.47	1	41.8	1.32	0.24	13.03
Live show 6	12 November	10.92	3	40.9	1.10	0.31	12.33
Live results 6	13 November	11.79	1	41.9	1.47	—N/a ^{1}	13.26
Live show 7	19 November	10.41	2	39.0	1.28	0.31	12.00
Live results 7	20 November	11.22	1	39.1	1.36	0.24	12.82
Live show 8	26 November	9.99	2	38.4	1.31	0.25	11.55
Live results 8	27 November	11.22	1	41.8	1.52	0.23	12.97
Live show 9	3 December	10.23	2	39.9	1.20	0.37	11.80
Live results 9	4 December	11.08	1	40.2	1.38	0.34	12.81
Live final	10 December	10.36	2	40.1	1.36	0.34	12.06
Live final results	11 December	12.09	1	44.3	1.37	0.23	13.69
Series average	2011	10.82	—N/a	42.3	1.23	0.40^{4}	12.41

^{1} The ITV1+1 rating for this episode is unavailable as it was outside the top 10 programmes of the week on BARB.
^{4} The average figure for ITV1+1 includes only the episodes with figures available.

== Controversies ==
=== Allegation of bullying ===
Misha B was involved in a controversy during the third live show when Tulisa accused her of being "so feisty" and making "mean comments" and Walsh accused her of being a "bully" backstage. Both later apologised. The other two judges, Barlow and Rowland, and several contestants defended Misha B during and after the show, and Barlow stated in his 2018 autobiography A Better Me that he had refused to give into backstage producers' attempts to convince him and the other judges to stir up the bullying narrative against her to attract media coverage to the show. Barlow later said he believed the wrongful allegations had ended her chances of winning the competition. In June 2020, Misha B stated that as a result of the orchestrated racism she experienced at the hands of the producers, she suffered suicidal tendencies and was eventually diagnosed with PTSD. Tulisa responded that racism was completely out of the context of her comments that night.

=== Frankie Cocozza's ejection ===
On 8 November, Frankie Cocozza was ejected from the competition. He released a statement saying "I'd like to apologise to Gary, my fellow contestants and everyone who has voted for me, but, as of today, I will no longer be in The X Factor. My life during the show has gone out of control and my behaviour off stage has overstepped the rules of the competition."

The Sun newspaper claimed Cocozza had been overheard boasting about using cocaine.

Cocozza's behaviour earlier in the series has led to two Ofcom investigations – he swore during a live show and was also shown drinking heavily with some friends.
