= Crystal Kay discography =

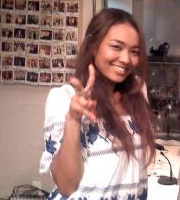
- Kay in 2008
- Studio albums: 12
- Extended plays: 4
- Compilation albums: 6
- Singles: 55

The discography of Japanese contemporary R&B singer Crystal Kay consists of 12 studio albums, four extended plays, six compilation albums, four video albums and numerous single releases. Crystal Kay debuted as a singer at 13 years of age in 1999 under Epic Records Japan. Her third album Almost Seventeen (2002) saw a great leap in popularity for Crystal Kay, reaching number two on Oricon's albums chart. In 2005, Crystal Kay sang the eponymous theme song for the Tsuyoshi Kusanagi drama Koi ni Ochitara: Boku no Seikō no Himitsu. "Koi ni Ochitara" became Crystal Kay's most successful single, being certified for a million ringtone downloads.

In 2011, Crystal Kay signed to Delicious Deli Records, after 11 years with Epic Records, and released the album Vivid (2012). In March 2013 Crystal Kay relocated to New York City to pursue an American debut through Copetin Inc, releasing the single "Busy Doing Nothing" a year later. In October 2014, Crystal Kay re-focused on Japan by switching her management to LDH.

== Studio albums ==
List of studio albums, with selected chart positions and certifications
Title	Album details	Peak positions			Sales (Note: Sales provided by Oricon database and are rounded to the nearest thousand copies, or for when the value rounds to zero, the nearest hundred copies.)	Certifications
Title	Album details	JPN	KOR Intl. (Note: The Gaon Albums Chart was established in 2010. The overseas chart is a sub-chart listing all non-Korean released which have charted.) (Note: Week references for Gaon: Rock 'n' Roll Circus,)	TWN East Asia (Note: The G-Music chart was established in July 2005 and only archives the top 20 releases. The East Asian chart is a sub-chart that compiles all non-Chinese Asian language releases which have been popular on the charts.) (Note: Week references for G-Music: All Yours 2007 week 25, "Revolution".)	Sales	Certifications
C.L.L Crystal Lover Light	Released: March 23, 2000 (JPN); Label: Epic; Formats: CD, digital download, streaming	60	—	—	JPN: 19,000	
637: Always and Forever	Released: August 22, 2001 (JPN); Label: Epic; Formats: CD, digital download, streaming	19	—	—	JPN: 49,000	RIAJ: Gold
Almost Seventeen	Released: October 23, 2002 (JPN); Label: Epic; Formats: CD, digital download, streaming	2	—	—	JPN: 354,000	RIAJ: Platinum
4 Real	Released: November 27, 2003 (JPN); Label: Epic; Formats: CD, digital download, streaming	6	—	—	JPN: 246,000	RIAJ: Platinum
Crystal Style	Released: March 2, 2005 (JPN); Label: Epic; Formats: CD, CD/DVD, digital download, streaming	2	—	—	JPN: 297,000	RIAJ: Platinum
Call Me Miss...	Released: February 22, 2006 (JPN); Label: Epic; Formats: CD, CD/DVD, digital download, streaming	2	—	—	JPN: 251,000	RIAJ: Platinum
All Yours	Released: June 20, 2007 (JPN); Label: Epic; Formats: CD, CD/DVD, digital download, streaming	1	—	5	JPN: 137,000	RIAJ: Gold
Color Change!	Released: August 6, 2008 (JPN); Label: Epic; Formats: CD, CD/2DVD, digital download, streaming	8	—	—	JPN: 100,000	RIAJ: Gold
Spin the Music	Released: December 8, 2010 (JPN); Label: Epic; Formats: CD, digital download, streaming	42	40	—	JPN: 10,000	
Vivid	Released: June 27, 2012; Label: Delicious Deli; Formats: CD, CD/DVD, digital download, streaming	35	—	—	JPN: 5,000	
Shine	Released: December 16, 2015; Label: Delicious Deli; Formats: CD, CD/DVD, CD/Blu-ray, digital download, streaming	10	—	—	JPN: 17,000	
For You	Released: June 13, 2018; Label: Virgin; Formats: CD, CD/DVD, digital download, streaming	30	—	—	JPN: 4,000	
"—" denotes items which were released before the creation of the G-Music or Gaon charts, or items that did not chart.

== Extended plays ==
List of extended plays, with selected chart positions
Title	Album details	Peak positions	Sales
Title	Album details	JPN	Sales
Shining	Released: November 28, 2007 (JPN); Label: Epic; Formats: CD, digital download, streaming	21	JPN: 12,000
Flash	Released: June 16, 2010 (JPN); Label: Epic; Formats: CD, CD/DVD, digital download, streaming	29	JPN: 6,000
Start Again EP	Released: February 24, 2023; Label: Virgin; Formats: Digital download, streaming	—	
"—" denotes items that did not chart.

=== Remix extended plays ===
List of remix extended plays
Title	Album details
Refresh: One	Released: October 2, 2026; Label: Virgin; Formats: Digital download, streaming

== Compilation albums ==
List of compilation albums, with selected chart positions and certifications
Title	Album details	Peak positions	Sales	Certifications
Title	Album details	JPN	Sales	Certifications
Crystal Kay	Album compiling English language songs, released as Natural: World Premiere Album in Japan; Released: November 7, 2003 (KOR); Label: Epic; Formats: CD, digital download, streaming	34	JPN: 30,000	
CK5	Released: June 30, 2004 (JPN); Label: Epic; Formats: CD, CD/DVD, digital download, streaming	2	JPN: 282,000	RIAJ: Platinum
Best of Crystal Kay	Released: September 2, 2009 (JPN); Label: Epic; Formats: 2CD, 3CD, digital download, streaming	3	JPN: 156,000	RIAJ: Gold
The Best Remixes of CK	Released: December 16, 2009 (JPN); Label: Epic; Formats: CD, digital download, streaming	195	JPN: 1,000	
Love Song Best	Released: December 14, 2011 (JPN); Label: Epic; Formats: CD, 2CD, digital download, streaming	81	JPN: 4,000	
All Time Best 25th Anniversary	Released: June 25, 2025; Label: Virgin, Sony Japan; Formats: CD, digital download, streaming	39	JPN: 886	

== Cover albums ==
List of cover albums, with selected chart positions
Title	Album details	Peak positions
Title	Album details	JPN
I Sing	Released: April 21, 2021; Label: Virgin; Formats: CD, digital download, streaming	61

== Soundtrack albums ==
List of soundtrack albums, with selected chart positions
Title	Album details
A2Z (with Akihiro Manabe)	Released: March 1, 2023; Label: Virgin; Formats: CD, digital download, streaming

== Singles ==
=== As a lead artist ===
List of singles, with selected chart positions
Title	Year	Peak chart positions			Sales (JPN)	Certifications	Album
Title	Year	JPN	JPN Hot (Note: Sources for chart positions are as follows: "Namida no Saki ni", "One", "After Love (First Boyfriend)", "Girlfriend", "Boyfriend (Part II)", "Koi ni Ochitara", "Step by Step", "Flash", "Journey (Kimi to Futari de)", "Superman", "All You Need Is Love", "Delicious na Kinyōbi", "Forever", "Answer", "Physical", "Inochi no Rhythm", "Kimi ga Ita kara", "Revolution", "Nando demo", "Very Special".)	TWN East Asia	Sales (JPN)	Certifications	Album
"Eternal Memories"	1999	47	—	—	20,000		C.L.L Crystal Lover Light
"Teenage Universe (Chewing Gum Baby)"	1999	47	—	—	13,000		C.L.L Crystal Lover Light
"Komichi no Hana" (こみちの花; "Path Flower")	1999	80	—	—	3,000		C.L.L Crystal Lover Light
"Shadows of Desire"	2000	—	—	—			C.L.L Crystal Lover Light
"Girl's Night"	2001	100	—	—	2,000		637: Always and Forever
"Ex-Boyfriend" (featuring Verbal)	2001	44	—	—	21,000		637: Always and Forever
"Think of U"	2001	60	—	—	7,000		Almost Seventeen
"Hard to Say"	2002	26	—	—	45,000		Almost Seventeen
"Girl U Love"	2002	156	—	—	1,000		Almost Seventeen
"Boyfriend (Part II)"	2003	3	40 (Note: Charted in 2009.)	—	133,000	RIAJ (digital): Gold	4 Real
"I Like It" (with M-Flo)	2003	8	—	—	58,000		4 Real
"Candy"	2003	2	—	—	15,000		4 Real
"Can't Be Stopped"	2003	146	—	—	1,000		4 Real
"Motherland"	2004	9	—	—	43,000		CK5
"Bye My Darling!"	2004	40	—	—	7,000		Crystal Style
"Kiss"	2005	10	—	—	65,000	RIAJ (cellphone): Gold	Crystal Style
"Koi ni Ochitara" (恋におちたら; "If I Fall in Love")	2005	2	51	—	750,000	RIAJ (ringtone): Million; RIAJ (digital): 2× Platinum; RIAJ (physical): Platinum; RIAJ (streaming): Gold	Call Me Miss...
"Two as One" (with Chemistry)	2005	2	—	—	200,000	RIAJ (cellphone): Gold; RIAJ (physical): Gold	Call Me Miss...
"Kirakuni" ("Take It Easy")	2006	27	1	5	14,000		Call Me Miss...
"Together"	2006	27	12	5	14,000		Call Me Miss...
"Kitto Eien ni" (きっと永遠に; "Surely for Eternity")	2007	12	—	—	20,000	RIAJ (cellphone): Gold	All Yours
"Konna ni Chikaku de..." (こんなに近くで; "This Close...")	2007	14	—	—	17,000	RIAJ (cellphone): Gold	All Yours
"Anata no Soba de" (あなたのそばで; "Next to You")	2007	30	—	—	7,000		All Yours
"Namida no Saki ni" (涙のさきに; "Beyond the Tears")	2008	42	29	—	4,000		Color Change!
"One"	2008	32	20	—	7,000		Color Change!
"Girlfriend" (featuring BoA)	2009	31	57	—	4,000		Best of Crystal Kay
"After Love (First Boyfriend)" (featuring Kaname of Chemistry)	2009	31	20	—	4,000		Spin the Music
"Journey (Kimi to Futari de)" (君と二人で; "Together with You")	2010	193	14	—	400		Spin the Music
"Superman"	2011	55	7	—	3,000		Vivid
"Delicious na Kinyōbi" (デリシャスな金曜日; "Delicious Friday")	2012	171	9	—	400		Vivid
"Haruarashi" (ハルアラシ; "Spring Storm")	2012	171	— (Note: Charted at number 90 on the Adult Contemporary Airplay chart.)	—	400		Vivid
"Forever"	2012	—	6	—			Vivid
"Busy Doing Nothing"	2014	—	—	—			non-album singles
"Rule Your World"	2014	—	—	—			non-album singles
"Dum Ditty Dumb"	2014	—	—	—			non-album singles
"Kimi ga Ita kara" (君がいたから; "Because You Were There")	2015	27	21	—	106,000	RIAJ (digital): Gold	Shine
"Revolution" (featuring Namie Amuro)	2015	6	8	4	19,000		Shine
"Nando de Mo" (何度でも; "Many Times")	2015	—	16	—	100,000	RIAJ (digital): Gold	Shine
"Sakura" (サクラ; "Cherry Blossoms")	2016	30	— (Note: Charted at number 96 on the Radio Songs sub-chart.)	—			For You
"Lovin' You"	2016	149	—	—			For You
"Faces"	2017	—	—	—			For You
"Shiawase tte." (幸せって。; "You are happy.")	2018	—	80	—			For You
"Beautiful"	2019	—	—	—			non-album single
"Sangatsu Kokonoka" (３月９日; "March 9th")	2020	—	—	—			I Sing
"Utautai no Ballad" (歌うたいのバラッド; "Ballad I want to sing")	2020	—	—	—			I Sing
"I Love..."	2020	—	—	—			I Sing
"Hitori Ja Naikara" (ひとりじゃないから; "Because I'm not alone")	2021	—	—	—			Non-album singles
"Say My Name" (with Tetsu)	2021	—	—	—			Non-album singles
"Just for One Night" (with Bsmntprty and Niko Brim)	2021	—	—	—			Non-album singles
"Gimme Some" (with Daichi Yamamoto)	2022	—	—	—			Non-album singles
"No Pressure" (featuring VivaOla)	2022	—	—	—			Non-album singles
"Love Me"	2022	—	—	—			Non-album singles
"Start Again"	2023	—	—	—			Start Again EP & A2Z
"How You Feel"	2023	—	—	—			Start Again EP & A2Z
"Spark"	2023	—	—	—			Start Again EP & A2Z
"That Girl"	2024	—	—	—			TBA
"—" denotes items which were released before the creation of the Billboard Japan Hot 100, or did not chart.

=== As a featured artist ===
List of singles, with selected chart positions
Title	Year	Peak chart positions		Sales (JPN)	Album
Title	Year	JPN	JPN Hot	Sales (JPN)	Album
"Lost Child" (Hiroshi Fujiwara and Shinichi Osawa featuring Crystal Kay)	2001	55	—	15,000	Satorare Original Soundtrack / 637: Always and Forever
"Reeewind!" (M-Flo loves Crystal Kay)	2003	9	—	50,000	Astromantic
"Universe" (Note: As one of the three A-sides of the single "Eien / Universe / Believe in Love".) (BoA featuring Crystal Kay and Verbal of M-Flo)	2009	8	—	22,000	Best & USA
"Lovin' You" (ラヴィン・ユー, Ravin Yū) (Shota Shimizu, Crystal Kay, Mummy-D, Seamo, Dohzi-T)	2010	—	—		Beat Connection
"All You Need Is Love" (among Japan United with Music)	2012	11	11	26,000	Non-album single
"Answer" (with Tee)	2012	77	16	1,000	Much Love
"Where the Wild Things Are" (Far East Movement featuring Crystal Kay and Stereotypes)	2012	—	— (Note: Charted at number 47 on the Adult Contemporary Airplay and at 99 on the Hot Top Airplay charts.)		Dirty Bass
"Physical" (Bradberry Orchestra featuring Suga Shikao, Crystal Kay and Salyu)	2012	—	72		Non-album single
"Fantastic Journey" (Daishi Dance featuring Crystal Kay)	2012	—	— (Note: Charted at number 78 on the Adult Contemporary Airplay chart.)		Wonder Tourism
"Inochi no Rhythm" (イノチノリズム; "Rhythm of Life") (among Dance Earth Party)	2013	5	5	20,000	Non-album single
"Rock City" (Exile Shokichi featuring Sway & Crystal Kay)	2016	—	—		The Future
"Play That" (PKCZ featuring Hiroomi Tosaka, Crystal Kay & CRAZYBOY)	2017	—	—		360° ChamberZ
"Hot Like You (Fire)" (Freddy Browne featuring Jimmy Cozier & Crystal Kay)	2018	—	—		The Recipe
"Anata no Shiranai Watashitachi" (あなたの知らない私たち; "The Us You Don't Know") (chay featuring Crystal Kay)	2018	61	—		Lavender
"—" denotes items which were released before the creation of the Billboard Japan Hot 100 or did not chart.

=== Promotional singles ===
List of promotional singles, with selected chart positions
Title	Year	Peak chart positions	Album
Title	Year	JPN Hot	Album
"Shining"	2007	—	Shining
"Step by Step"	2009	52	Best of Crystal Kay
"Flash"	2010	40	Flash
"Time of Love"	2010	—	Spin the Music
"Take It Outside"	2012	—	Vivid
"Memory Box"	2012	—	Vivid
"What We Do"	2012	—	Vivid
"My Heart Beat"	2013	—	Non-album songs
"Kaze no Kanata" (風の彼方; "The Other Side of the Wind")	2013	—	Non-album songs
"Very Special" (featuring Ryuji Imaichi (Sandaime J Soul Brothers from Exile Tribe)	2015	60	Shine
"Rain on Me" (with Sumire, Tigarah & Ukico)	2020	—	Non-album song
"Steady"	2021	—	Speed Spirits
"—" denotes items that were released before the creation of the Japan Hot 100, or did not chart.

== Other appearances ==
Title	Year	Album	Notes
"L'amant" (Ken Hirai)	2001	Gaining Through Losing	Cameo introduction vocals
"Feel the Same?" (DJ Watarai featuring Big-O & Crystal Kay)	2002	Harlem Ver. 1.0
"Tha Superstar" (Michico)	2002	Non-album song	Cameo vocals
"Hello Goodbye" (Palm Drive featuring Crystal Kay & Corn Head)	2003	Block Holiday
"Do U Like It? (by Fantastic Plastic Machine)" (Crystal Kay loves M-Flo)	2003	"Reeewind!" (single)	Remix of "I Like It"
"Get On!" (M-Flo loves Crystal Kay)	2003	Astromantic	Originally appeared on the "Reeewind!" single
"Reeewind! (Tomita Lab. Remix)" (M-Flo loves Crystal Kay)	2004	Astromantic Charm School
"Get On! (Ugly Duckling Remix)" (M-Flo loves Crystal Kay)	2004	Astromantic Charm School
"Love Don't Cry" (M-Flo loves Crystal Kay)	2007	Cosmicolor
"Love Don't Cry (KGN8 Remix)" (M-Flo loves Crystal Kay)	2007	Electricolor	Remixed by Stephen McGregor.
"Music Is Mine" (Maboroshi featuring Crystal Kay)	2009	Maboroshi no Shi
"Wonder" (Jin Akanishi featuring Crystal Kay)	2009	KAT-TUN Live: Break the Records (video album)	Duet with Jin Akanishi, performed live at KAT-TUN's Summer '09 Break the Records (2009) tour and Akanishi's solo Yellow Gold 3011 (2011), however the studio recording has not been released.
"Universe (BoA Release Party 2009 Best & USA: Thank You For Your Support!! @ Studio Coast)" (BoA featuring Crystal Kay & Verbal (M-Flo))	2010	Identity (CD/DVD)
"Zutto" (ずっと; "On and On") (Tokyo Ska Paradise Orchestra (Vocal: Crystal Kay))	2010	World Ska Symphony
"Love Don't Cry (live)" (M-Flo loves Crystal Kay)	2010	M-Flo 10 Years Special Live: We Are One (video album)
"Reeewind! / Get On! (live)" (M-Flo loves Crystal Kay)	2010	M-Flo 10 Years Special Live: We Are One (video album)
"Cannonball"	2010	10-nen Saki mo Kimi ni Koishite Original Soundtrack	Acted as the ending theme song for the drama, while Crystal Kay's song "Time of Love" was the theme song.
"Zutto (live)" (Tokyo Ska Paradise Orchestra with Crystal Kay)	2010	Tokyo Ska Paradise Kokugikan & Tokyo Ska Paradise Taiikukan Live DVD (video album)
"Jungle Boogie (live)" (ジャングル・ブギ, Janguru Bugi) (Tokyo Ska Paradise Orchestra with Tamio Okuda, Crystal Kay, Kazuyoshi Saito)	2010	Tokyo Ska Paradise Kokugikan & Tokyo Ska Paradise Taiikukan Live DVD (video album)
"Get On! (The Suitboys Remix)" (M-Flo loves Crystal Kay)	2011	After 5 Vol. 1	Remixed by Taku Takahashi.
"Koi ni Ochitara (live)"	2011	Jyonetsu Tairiku Live Best
"Suki (live)" (Dreams Come True with Crystal Kay)	2012	Minna de Dori Suru? Do You Dreams Come True? Special Live! (video album)
"Asa ga Mata Kuru (live)" (朝がまた来る; "The Morning Still Comes") (Dreams Come True with Crystal Kay)	2012	Minna de Dori Suru? Do You Dreams Come True? Special Live! (video album)
"Endless Love" (Lionel Richie with Crystal Kay)	2012	Tuskegee (Japanese Edition)	Japanese bonus track, replacing Shania Twain's vocals with Crystal Kay's.
"Eyes on Me (live)"	2012	Final Fantasy Orchestral Album (video album)
"Senka no Hoshi de" (戦下の地球(ほし)で; "On the Planet Under War") (among Dance Earth Party)	2013	"Inochi no Rhythm" (single)
"Boyfriend (Part II) (live)"	2013	Live & Documentary DVD "AP Bank Fes '12 Fund for Japan" (video album)	DVD charity concert for AP Bank.
"I Don't Care" (Aklo featuring Crystal Kay)	2014	The Arrival
"All My Ladies" (Che'Nelle featuring Crystal Kay & Thelma Aoyama)	2015	@chenelleworld
"Nekketsu" (Nekfeu featuring Crystal Kay)	2016	Cyborg
"Inochi no Rhythm ~Great Journey~" (イノチノリズム ~Great Journey~, "Rhythm of Life ~Great Journey~") (DANCE EARTH PARTY featuring EXILE NESMITH with Crystal Kay)	2017	I	Cd and DVD
"Without You" (JAY'ED featuring Crystal Kay)	2017	Here I Stand
"World Is Yours" (PKCZ featuring Crystal Kay, MIGHTY CROWN (MASTA SIMON & SAMI-T))	2017	360°ChamberZ
"T-REX" (PKCZ featuring Crystal Kay, CRAZYBOY, ANARCHY )	2017	360°ChamberZ
"Ai wa Naze" (愛はなぜ; "Why is love") (Sung Si-kyung with Crystal Kay)	2018	Kimi ga Iru yo
"TAYUTAU" (LNoL featuring Crystal Kay)	2019	Equanimity
"Pixels" (Nekfeu featuring Crystal Kay)	2019	Les étoiles vagabondes : expansion
"Your Hands", "Tetris Crystal", "I Think the Game", "On Top", "I Love Vertigo" (Chassol featuring Crystal Kay)	2020	Ludi	Appearing also in the video version of the album.

== Video albums ==
List of media, with selected chart positions
Title	Album details	Peak positions
Title	Album details	JPN
CK 99—04 Music Clips	Released: June 30, 2004 (JPN); Label: Epic; Formats: DVD, UMD	19
CK 04—09 Music Clips 2: Decade	Released: December 2, 2009 (JPN); Label: Epic; Formats: DVD	253
Crystal Kay Live in NHK Hall: 10th Anniversary Tour CK10	Released: June 16, 2010 (JPN); Label: Epic; Formats: DVD, Blu-ray	122
CK Live 2012: Vivid	Released: March 6, 2013 (JPN); Label: Universal; Formats: DVD	—
"—" denotes items that did not chart.
