= All Time Best 25th Anniversary =

2025 greatest hits album by Crystal Kay

- Standard edition cover

Greatest hits album by Crystal Kay
- Released: June 24, 2025
- Recorded: 1999–2024
- Length: 148:33
- Label: Virgin

Crystal Kay chronology
A2Z (2023)	All Time Best 25th Anniversary (2025)

All Time Best 25th Anniversary is the fourth greatest hits album by Japanese singer Crystal Kay. Released digitally on June 24, 2025, through Virgin Music, the album was released physically the next day on June 25, 2025. Celebrating her 25th anniversary in the music industry, the album includes material from Kay's early discography under her former record label Epic Records Japan alongside subsequent releases under Virgin Music, collaborations and re-recordings.

== Background ==
Following the release of the Start Again EP and the A2Z soundtrack, Crystal Kay released two singles in 2024, "That Girl" and "Love Myself". Near the end of the year, she released a vinyl version of "Love Myself", which included "That Girl", "No Pressure" and "Gimme Some". In December 2024, Kay held a 25th anniversary concert in Yokohama.

== Release and promotion ==
Kay announced the release of All Time Best 25th Anniversary on April 14, 2025. The standard edition features a total of 32 tracks on two discs while the limited edition DVD / Blu-ray version includes live performance videos recorded during Kay's 25th anniversary concert.

== Track listing ==
All Time Best 25th Anniversary – disc one
No.	Title	Length
1.	"Eternal Memories"	5:06
2.	"Let's Suika Dorobo" (レッツすいかどろぼう)	5:06
3.	"Lost Child" (Original version) (Hiroshi Fujiwara and Shinichi Osawa featuring Crystal Kay)	6:39
4.	"Ex-Boyfriend"	5:12
5.	"Tsuki no Nai Yoru Michi no Nai Basho" (月のない夜 道のない場所) (re-recording)	4:26
6.	"Think of U"	4:56
7.	"Hard to Say" (MSG version)	4:06
8.	"Boyfriend: Part II"	4:58
9.	"I Like It" (with M-Flo)	5:42
10.	"What Time Is It?"	4:06
11.	"Kataomoi" (片想い)	4:24
12.	"Motherland"	4:30
13.	"Kiss"	5:31
14.	"Two as One" (with Chemistry)	3:46
15.	"Koi ni Ochitara" (re-recording)	4:28
16.	"Kitto Eien ni"	5:03

All Time Best 25th Anniversary – disc two
No.	Title	Length
1.	"Konna ni Chikaku de..." (こんなに近くで)	4:03
2.	"One"	4:08
3.	"Girlfriend"	3:43
4.	"Superman"	3:49
5.	"Delicious Friday" (デリシャスな金曜日)	4:07
6.	"Forever"	4:16
7.	"Kima ga Ita Kara" (君がいたから)	4:57
8.	"Revolution" (featuring Namie Amuro)	4:42
9.	"Nando Demo" (何度でも)	4:51
10.	"Lovin' You"	4:38
11.	"Play That" (PKCZ featuring Hiroomi Tosaka, Crystal Kay and Crazyboy)	6:05
12.	"Shiawasette." (幸せって。)	4:21
13.	"Watashi Tachi" (わたしたち)	4:27
14.	"I Love..."	5:01
15.	"Love Myself"	3:15
16.	"Best Version of Me"	4:13

All Time Best 25th Anniversary – limited edition bonus DVD / Blu-ray
No.	Title	Length
1.	"CK 25th Anniversary at KT Zepp Yokohama (December 21, 2024)"

All Time Best 25th Anniversary digital international track listing
No.	Title	Length
1.	"Tsuki no Nai Yoru Michi no Nai Basho" (re-recording)	4:25
2.	"Hard to Say" (MSG version)	4:06
3.	"Boyfriend: Part II" (re-recording)	4:58
4.	"Koi ni Ochitara" (re-recording)	4:27
5.	"One" (re-recording)	4:07
6.	"Superman"	3:49
7.	"Delicious Friday"	4:06
8.	"Forever"	4:16
9.	"Kima ga Ita Kara"	4:56
10.	"Revolution" (featuring Namie Amuro)	4:41
11.	"Nando Demo"	4:51
12.	"Lovin' You"	4:38
13.	"Shiawasette."	4:21
14.	"Watashi Tachi"	4:27
15.	"I Love..."	5:01
16.	"Love Myself"	3:14
17.	"Best Version of Me"	4:12
Total length:		74:43

== Charts ==
=== Weekly charts ===
Weekly chart performance for All Time Best 25th Anniversary
Chart (2025)	Peak position
Japanese Albums (Oricon)	39
Japanese Dance & Soul Albums (Oricon)	1
Japanese Top Albums Sales (Billboard Japan)	41

=== Monthly charts ===
Monthly chart performance for All Time Best 25th Anniversary
Chart (2025)	Position
Japanese Dance & Soul Albums (Oricon)	3

== Release history ==
Release history and formats for All Time Best 25th Anniversary
Region	Date	Format(s)	Version	Label	Ref.
Japan	June 24, 2025	Digital download; streaming	Standard	Virgin	
Various	June 24, 2025	Digital download; streaming	International	Virgin	
Japan	June 25, 2025	CD	Standard	Virgin	
Japan	June 25, 2025	CD; DVD	Limited	Virgin	
Japan	June 25, 2025	CD; Blu-ray	Limited	Virgin	
