= The Best Remixes of CK =

Remix album by Crystal Kay
- Released: December 16, 2009
- Recorded: 1999–2009
- Genre: J-Pop, R&B, dance
- Label: Epic

Crystal Kay chronology
Best of Crystal Kay (2009)	The Best Remixes of CK (2009)	Flash (2010)

The Best Remixes of CK is the first remix album by R&B and pop singer Crystal Kay. It was released on December 16, 2009, in Japan. The album contains remixes of various singles from Kay's career and includes remixes by popular Japanese producers such as Genki Rockets and Shinichi Osawa. The album contains three previously unreleased tracks including the "Oddity Remix" of "After Love", which had been used in commercials for Tully's Coffee earlier in the year.

== Track listing ==
1. "Koi ni Ochitara (Genki Rockets Remix)" (恋におちたら, If I Fall in Love)
2. "Boyfriend" (80kidz Remix)
3. "After Love: First Boyfriend" (Oddity Remix) (featuring Kaname)
4. "Teenage Universe: Chewing Gum Baby" (Remix)
5. "Girl's Night" (Shinichi Osawa Layer 7 Remix)
6. "Think of U" (KZ Future Disco Mix)
7. "Hard to Say" (TinyVoice Production Remix)
8. "Do U Like It" (Extended Mix: Fantastic Plastic Machine) (featuring M-Flo)
9. "Kitto Eien ni" (Studio Apartment Remix) (きっと永遠に, Surely Forever)
10. "Konna ni Chikaku de..." (KZ Future Disko Remix) (こんなに近くで..., This Close...)
11. "Shining" (Jazztronik Remix)
12. "Namida no Saki ni" (Soidog Mix) (涙のさきに, Beyond the Tears)
13. "One" (Cornelius Remix)
