= Journey (Kimi to Futari de) =

Single by Crystal Kay

from the album Spin the Music
- B-side: "Hold On"
- Released: November 24, 2010
- Recorded: 2009–10
- Genre: Pop
- Length: 4:03
- Label: Epic Records
- Songwriters: Crystal Kay, WolfJunk, Joey Carbone

Crystal Kay singles chronology
"After Love (First Boyfriend)/Girlfriend" (2009)	"Journey (Kimi to Futari de)" (2010)	"Superman" (2011)

Journey (Kimi to Futari de) (Journey ～君と二人で～, Journey (Together with You)) is Crystal Kay's 26th single. It was released on November 24, 2010 as the lead single to Spin the Music.

== Background and promotion ==
"Journey (Kimi to Futari de)" is Kay's first release since Flash in June 2010, and her first single in 15 months. It was released just two weeks before Kay's ninth studio album Spin the Music. The release was first announced on September 30 on Kay's official website. The title track was featured in commercials for Japanese skincare range Attenir. The commercial began airing from October 6 onwards. The single features "HOLD ON" as its b-side. The song was used as the theme song to the 2009 film adaption of Dolan's Cadillac. It was first announced that Kay would sing for the film on August 16, 2008.

=== Music video ===
The music video for "Journey (Kimi to Futari de)" was directed by Amber, it was revealed in early November. The video features a tearful Kay reminiscing on various times in a past relationship, such as Kay and her former lover together at a park and having dinner. The video then subsequently ends with Kay crying to herself softly.

== Track listing ==
No.	Title	Lyrics	Music	Arrangement	Length
1.	"Journey (Kimi to Futari de)" (Journey ～君と二人で～)	Crystal Kay, WolfJunk	WolfJunk		4:03
2.	"Hold On"	Joey Carbone	Anthony Mazza, Christine Kellogg	Ryosuke "Dr. R" Sakai, Carbone	4:29
3.	"Journey (Kimi to Futari de) (Instrumental)"	Kay, WolfJunk	Kay, WolfJunk		4:02
Total length:					12:34

== Charts ==
Chart (2010)	Peak position
Recochoku Chaku-Uta Weekly Chart	39
Billboard Japan Hot 100	14
Billboard Japan Hot Top Airplay	7
Billboard Japan Adult Contemporary Airplay	26
RIAJ Digital Track Chart	79
Oricon Weekly Singles Chart	192

== Release history ==
Region	Date	Format	Label
Japan	November 24, 2010	CD single, digital download	Epic Records
