= Shine (Crystal Kay album) =

- Regular edition cover

Studio album by Crystal Kay
- Released: December 16, 2015
- Recorded: 2014–15
- Genre: J-pop
- Length: 58:11
- Labels: Delicious Deli; Virgin

Crystal Kay chronology
Vivid (2012)	Shine (2015)	For You (2018)

Singles from Shine
- 1. "Kimi ga Ita Kara" Released: May 13, 2015; 2. "Revolution" Released: September 2, 2015; 3. "Nando Demo" Released: November 4, 2015

Shine is the eleventh studio album by Japanese singer Crystal Kay. It was released on December 16, 2015, through Delicious Deli Records and Virgin Records, her first album release in three years since Vivid (2012).

== Background and release ==
Shine is the eleventh studio album released by Crystal Kay. It is her first album released in three years since June 2012's Vivid, and her second album with Universal Music Japan. The album was released and distributed in three versions: a limited CD+Blu-ray edition, a limited CD+DVD edition, and a regular CD edition.

== Singles ==
"Kimi ga Ita Kara" (meaning "Because I Had You") is Kay's 30th physical single. The song was first released for digital download followed by two physical releases: a limited CD+DVD edition and a regular CD only edition. It was used as theme song for the Nippon TV drama Wild Heroes. The B-side track on the release "The Light" was previously released as her 11th digital single and was used as the commercial song for Samsung's Galaxy S6. This is Crystal's first physical single released in three years, following "Forever". The single reached #27 on the weekly Oricon Singles Chart and stayed in the ranking for six weeks, selling 6,146 copies.

"Revolution" is the 31st physical single released by Kay, featuring Japanese singer Namie Amuro. It premiered digitally in Japan on September 2, 2015, while the physical single was released to markets in Japan and Taiwan on September 16. The physical release was distributed in two versions: a limited CD+DVD edition and a regular CD only edition. Pre-orders for the single included a limited edition A2 sized poster. Commercially, the single peaked at #6 and sold more than 19,000 copies.

"Nando Demo" is the fourth digital single released by Kay. It was used as an insert song for the Fuji TV drama Otona Joshi.

== Track listing ==
No.	Title	Length
1.	"何度でも" (Nando Demo; Countless Times)	4:49
2.	"I'm Beautiful"	3:59
3.	"Very Special" (feat. Ryuji Imaichi from Sandaime J Soul Brothers from Exile Tribe (Debra Laws cover))	4:42
4.	"君がいたから" (Kimi ga Ita Kara; Because I Had You)	4:57
5.	"Revolution" (feat. Namie Amuro)	4:41
6.	"The Light"	3:52
7.	"Shooting Star"	4:38
8.	"#Heartmelt" (feat. AK-69)	4:31
9.	"君と二人なら" (Kimi to Futari Nara; If the Two of Us)	4:03
10.	"Everlasting"	4:43
11.	"Someday"	4:05
12.	"Present"	4:13
13.	"Revolution (PKCZ(r) Remix)" (feat. Namie Amuro, Sway)	4:55
Total length:		58:11

== Charts and sales ==
=== Album ===
Chart performance for Shine
Chart (2015)	Peak position
Japanese Daily Albums (Oricon)	8
Japanese Weekly Albums (Oricon)	10

Sales
Chart	Amount
Oricon physical sales	17,272

=== Singles ===
Release date	Title	Peak positions			Physical sales	Certifications
Release date	Title	JPN	JPN Hot	TWN Jpop	Physical sales	Certifications
May 13, 2015	"Kimi ga Ita Kara"	27	21	—	6,000	RIAJ: Gold (digital)
September 2, 2015	"Revolution"	6	8	4	19,000	—
November 4, 2015	"Nando Demo"	—	16	—	—	RIAJ: Gold (digital)
