= Koi ni Ochitara =

Single by Crystal Kay

from the album Call Me Miss…
- Released: May 18, 2005
- Recorded: 2005
- Genre: J-pop; R&B
- Length: 4:29
- Label: Sony Music Japan
- Songwriters: H.U.B.; Shingo.S
- Producer: Sakazume Misako

Crystal Kay singles chronology
"Kiss" (2005)	"Koi ni Ochitara" (2005)	"Two as One" (2005)

Music video
- "Koi ni Ochitara" on YouTube

"Koi ni Ochitara" (Japanese: 恋におちたら; English: If I Fall in Love) is a song recorded by Japanese singer Crystal Kay for her sixth studio album Call Me Miss… (2006). Written by H.U.B. and Shingo.S with production handled by Sakazume MisakIt, it was released as her 17th physical single through Sony Music Japan on May 18, 2005. The single is supported with the B-side tracks "Love It Take It" and "Bet You Don't Know (English ver.)"; the latter track was originally included as part of her previous album Crystal Style (2005).

A commercial success in Japan, "Koi ni Ochitara" peaked at number two on the Oricon Singles Chart and sold over 288,000 copies by the end of the year, making it the 30th best-selling single in the country in 2005. It was certified five times by the Recording Industry Association of Japan (RIAJ) in different categories, including double platinum for digital sales, million in chaku-uta (ringtone), platinum in physical shipments, and gold in streaming. In 2009, the title track attained a new peak on the Billboard Japan Hot 100 of number 51.

== Background and release ==
"Koi ni Ochitara" was used as the theme for the drama Koi ni Ochitara ~Boku no Seikou no Himitsu~, which was broadcast in Japan from April to June 2005. The single was officially released on May 18, 2005, as the lead single for Kay's sixth studio album Call Me Miss…, which was made available on February 22, 2006. The song was additionally included as part of the Best of Crystal Kay compilation album and was remixed by Genki Rockets for her remix album The Best Remixes of CK, both released in 2009. In the same year, during Crystal Kay's 10-year career project, titled "Let's Vote -Minna ga Eranda Crystal Kay no Daisuki na Kyoku-" the song was ranked second.

== Music video ==
The music video for "Koi ni Ochitara" features Crystal singing at the Roppongi Hills Mori Tower. As she does, the video cuts to her singing in a purple and pink background.

== Reception ==
The single is currently the best-selling single of her career, selling 295,456 copies to date and Kay has stated that it changed the focus of her career away from R&B and towards J-pop. In its first week it sold 73,717 copies, in its second week it dropped to number 4 and sold 51,546 copies, and in the third week it fell one place to number 5, selling a further 38,302 copies.

== Track listing ==
CD single

1. "Koi ni Ochitara" (恋におちたら; If I Fall in Love) — 4:29
2. "Love It Take It" — 3:27
3. "Bet You Don't Know (English Version)" — 4:38
4. "Koi ni Ochitara (Instrumental)" — 4:29

== Credits and personnel ==
- Crystal Kay – vocalist (all tracks), lyricist/composer (track 3)
- H.U.B. – lyricist (track 1)
- Sakazume Misako – producer (track 1)
- Shingo.S – arranger (track 1)
- Natsumi Watanabe – lyricist (track 2)
- Jamelia Davis – composer, arranger (track 2)
- Sean Hosein – composer (track 2)
- Dane Deviller – composer (track 2)
- Ashley Ingram – composer, arranger (track 3)

== Charts ==
=== Daily and weekly charts ===
Chart (2005, 2009)	Peak position
Japan Daily Singles Chart (Oricon)	1
Japan Weekly Singles Chart (Oricon)	2
Japan (Japan Hot 100)	51

=== Yearly charts ===
Chart (2005)	Position
Japan Singles Chart (Oricon)	30

== Sales and certifications ==
Region	Certification	Certified units/sales
Japan (RIAJ) Digital single	2× Platinum	500,000^{*}
Japan (RIAJ) Physical single	Platinum	295,456
Japan (RIAJ) Chaku-Uta	Million	1,000,000^{*}
Japan (RIAJ) Chaku-Uta Full	Platinum	250,000^{*}
Streaming
Japan (RIAJ)	Gold	50,000,000^{†}
^{*} Sales figures based on certification alone.^{†} Streaming-only figures based on certification alone.
