= Love Song Best =

Compilation album by Crystal Kay
- Released: December 14, 2011
- Genre: J-Pop, R&B
- Length: Disc 1: 1:14:25 (TBC); Disc 2: 26:55 (TBC)
- Label: Epic

Crystal Kay chronology
Spin the Music (2010)	Love Song Best (2011)	Vivid (2012)

Love Song Best is the third compilation album from J-Pop/R&B singer Crystal Kay. The album was announced by Kay's former longtime label Epic Records Japan after her move to Universal Music Japan sublabel Delicious Deli Records and its release was set to coincide with the release of Kay's first single with Delicious Deli, "Superman".

== Track listing ==
Disc 1
No.	Title	Length
1.	"Boyfriend ~Part II~"	5:01
2.	"Koi ni Ochitara~ (恋におちたら, If I Fall in Love)"	4:30
3.	"Kiss"	5:31
4.	"My Dear"	4:12
5.	"Journey ~Kimi to Futari de~ (Journey ～君と二人で～, Journey ~Together with You~)"	4:03
6.	"Time of Love"	5:45
7.	"Cannonball"	4:22
8.	"After Love ~First Boyfriend~ (feat. Kaname (Chemistry))"	3:33
9.	"Flash"	3:31
10.	"CURIOUS"	4:21
11.	"Two As One (Crystal Kay x Chemistry)"	3:47
12.	"Kitto Eien ni (きっと永遠に, Surely Forever)"	5:04
13.	"Namida ga Afuretemo (涙があふれても, Overflowing Tears)"	5:13
14.	"Lost Child (Original Version) (Osawa Shinichi + Fujiwara Hiroshi feat. Crystal Kay)"	6:38
15.	"Konna ni Chikaku de... (こんなに近くで..., This Close...)"	4:04
16.	"Hard to Say"	4:50
Total length:		74:25

Disc 2
No.	Title	Length
1.	"No More Blue Christmas' (Natalie Cole cover)"	4:35
2.	"Happy 045 Xmas"	4:02
3.	"As One"	5:06
4.	"LOVE it TAKE it"	3:28
5.	"Shining"	4:49
6.	"Think of U"	4:55
Total length:		26:55

== Charts ==
Chart	Peak Position
Japan (Oricon Weekly Charts)	81

== Release history ==
Region	Date	Format	Label
Japan	December 14, 2011	CD, digital download	Sony Music Entertainment Japan
