= Shining (EP) =

EP by Crystal Kay
- Released: November 28, 2007
- Recorded: 2003–2007
- Genre: J-pop, R&B
- Length: 23:24
- Language: Japanese, English
- Label: Epic

Crystal Kay chronology
All Yours (2007)	Shining (2007)	Color Change! (2008)

Shining is the first EP by pop singer Crystal Kay. It was released on November 28, 2007. The EP features five tracks, all of which have a Christmas or holiday theme. A music video was made for the main promotional track, also called "Shining". The song was used in commercials for "Parco X'Mas TV" throughout the Christmas period, in which Kay starred. "Happy 045 Xmas"had been released digitally in 2005, and "No More Blue Christmas'" (a Natalie Cole cover) had been released on Kay's first English studio album Natural: World Premiere Album in December 2003.

First press editions of the EP had a sleeve cover and a greeting card.

== Track listing ==
1. "Shining" — 4:47
2. "Snowflake" — 4:26
3. "Happy 045 Xmas" — 4:00
4. "No More Blue Christmas'" — 4:32
5. "Shining" (Jazztronik Remix) — 5:41

== Charts ==
Charts (2007)	Peak Position	First Week Sales	Total Sales
Oricon Singles Chart	21	6,050	9,277
