= For You (Crystal Kay album) =

Studio album by Crystal Kay
- Released: June 13, 2018
- Recorded: 2016–2018
- Genre: J-pop
- Length: 45:47
- Label: Virgin

Crystal Kay chronology
Shine (2015)	For You (2018)	I Sing (2021)

Singles from For You
- 1. "Sakura" Released: March 18, 2016; 2. "Lovin' You" Released: August 12, 2016; 3. "Faces" Released: February 17, 2017; 4. "Shiawase tte." Released: April 19, 2018

For You is the twelfth studio album by Japanese singer Crystal Kay. It was released on June 13, 2018, through Virgin, and marked her first album release in three years since Shine (2015).

== Background and release ==
For You is Crystal Kay's first album released via Virgin after Delicious Deli Records went defunct in 2016. The album was released and distributed in two versions: a regular CD edition and a limited CD+DVD edition.

== Singles ==
"Sakura" (meaning "Cherry Blossoms") is Crystal Kay's 32nd single. The song was released for digital download followed by two physical releases: a regular CD edition and a limited CD+DVD edition. It was used in TV commercials featuring Miranda Kerr for Japanese fashion label Samantha Thavasa. The single reached number 30 on the weekly Oricon Singles Chart and charted for a total of four weeks.

"Lovin' You" is Crystal Kay's 33rd single. The song was released for digital download followed by two physical releases: a regular CD edition and a limited CD+DVD edition. It was used as the theme song for the drama Non Mama Hakusho. The single reached number 149 on the weekly Oricon Singles Chart.

"Faces" is Crystal Kay's 34th single. The song was released for digital download followed by a physical version containing audio messages from Crystal Kay. It was used in commercials for Sawai Pharmaceutical.

"Shiawase tte." (meaning "Happiness Is") is Crystal Kay's 35th single. The single was only available digitally. It was used as the theme song for the NHK drama Daisy Luck.

== Track listing ==
For You track listing
No.	Title	Length
1.	"幸せって。" (Shiawase tte.; Happiness Is)	4:20
2.	"わたしたち" (Watashitachi; Us)	4:24
3.	"I Just Wanna Fly"	4:17
4.	"Talk To Me"	3:33
5.	"Summer Fever"	3:32
6.	"Can't Stop Me"	5:07
7.	"Forever Young"	3:31
8.	"Lovin' You"	4:35
9.	"Faces"	5:04
10.	"サクラ" (Sakura; Cherry Blossom)	4:17
11.	"Waiting For You"	3:16
Total length:		45:47

== Charts ==
=== Album ===
Chart performance for For You
Chart (2018)	Peak position
Japanese Albums (Oricon)	30

=== Singles ===
Chart performance for singles from For You
Release date	Title	Peak positions	
Release date	Title	JPN	JPN Hot
March 18, 2016	"Sakura"	30	—
August 12, 2016	"Lovin' You"	149	—
February 17, 2017	"Faces"	—	—
April 19, 2018	"Shiawase tte."	—	80
