= Best of Crystal Kay =

Greatest hits album by Crystal Kay
- Released: September 2, 2009
- Recorded: 1999–2009
- Genre: J-pop, R&B
- Length: Disc 1: 76:21; Disc 2: 70:20; Total: 146:41
- Label: Epic

Crystal Kay chronology
Color Change! (2008)	Best of Crystal Kay (2009)	The Best Remixes of CK (2009)

Best of Crystal Kay is Crystal Kay's second greatest hits compilation album. It was released on September 2, 2009. The release of this album marked the 10th anniversary of Kay's career in the music industry on the label Sony Music Entertainment Japan. This compilation consists of Kay's hit songs and more, as well as a third disc with new tracks.

The album was certified Gold for shipment of 100,000 copies.

== Track listing ==
Disc 1
No.	Title	Length
1.	"Boyfriend: Part II"	4:59
2.	"Eternal Memories"	5:08
3.	"Komichi no Hana (こみちの花, Flower of the Lane)"	4:01
4.	"Darling P.P.P. (ダーリン P.P.P.)"	4:02
5.	"Girl's Night"	4:22
6.	"Ex-Boyfriend"	5:10
7.	"Lost Child"	6:38
8.	"Tsuki no Nai Yoru, Michi no Nai Basho (月のない夜、道のない場所, A Night without the Moon, A Place without the Way)"	4:23
9.	"A Song for You"	4:39
10.	"Think of U"	4:53
11.	"Hard to Say"	4:47
12.	"Girl U Love"	4:23
13.	"Kataomoi (片想い, Unrequited Love)"	4:23
14.	"I Like It"	5:44
15.	"Candy"	4:20
16.	"Can't Be Stopped"	4:29
Total length:		76:21

Disc 2
No.	Title	Length
1.	"Koi ni Ochitara (恋におちたら, If I Fall in Love)"	4:29
2.	"Motherland"	4:31
3.	"Tears"	4:59
4.	"Kiss"	5:30
5.	"Two as One"	3:44
6.	"I Know"	4:22
7.	"Kirakuni"	4:16
8.	"Namida ga Afuretemo (涙があふれても, Overflowing Tears)"	5:14
9.	"Kitto Eien ni (きっと永遠に, Surely Forever)"	5:02
10.	"Konna ni Chikaku de... (こんなに近くで..., This Close...)"	4:03
11.	"Anata no Soba de (あなたのそばで, Next to You)"	4:32
12.	"Dream World"	3:45
13.	"Namida no Saki ni (涙のさきに, Before the Tears)"	3:48
14.	"One"	4:03
15.	"Kaerimichi (帰り道, The Road Home)"	4:18
16.	"Girlfriend"	3:44
Total length:		70:20

Disc 3
No.	Title	Length
1.	"Over and Over"	5:05
2.	"Step by Step"	4:01
3.	"Private Dancers" (featuring Mummy-D and KREVA)	6:03
4.	"Helpless Night" (featuring Jin Akanishi)	4:24
Total length:		19:31

== Charting and release ==
"Best of Crystal Kay" entered the Oricon Daily Chart at #2, and sold 26,929 units that day. The album ultimately dropped to #3 on the Weekly Chart, behind Superfly's Box Emotions and the third week sales of Arashi's All the Best! 1999-2009, selling 87,669 copies. This is Kay's best peak position on the Oricon Chart since All Yours in 2007, as well as her best first week sales since Call me Miss... in 2006.

=== Oricon sales chart ===
Release	Chart	Peak position	First day/week sales	Sales total
September 2, 2009	Oricon Daily Albums Chart	2	26,929	
September 2, 2009	Oricon Weekly Albums Chart	3	87,669	155,799
September 2, 2009	Oricon Monthly Albums Chart	6		
September 2, 2009	Oricon Yearly Albums Chart	54		155,799

=== Various charts ===
Chart (2009)	Peak position
Japan (Oricon Weekly Albums Chart)	3
Japan (Billboard Japan Top Albums)	3
Taiwan (Five Music J-pop/K-pop Chart)	13

== Release history ==
Limited edition

Country	Date	Label	Format	Catalogue #
Japan	September 2, 2009	Sony Music Entertainment Japan	Compact disc	ESCL-3271/ESCL-3273

Standard edition

Country	Date	Label	Format	Catalogue #
Japan	September 2, 2009	Sony Music Entertainment Japan	Compact disc	ESCL-3274/ESCL-3275
