= Flash (EP) =

EP by Crystal Kay
- Released: June 16, 2010
- Recorded: 2010
- Genres: Pop, R&B, electropop, dance-pop
- Length: 21:55
- Label: Epic

Crystal Kay chronology
| The Best Remixes of CK (2009) | Flash (2010) | Spin the Music (2010) |

Alternative cover

Flash (stylized as FLASH) is Japanese singer-songwriter Crystal Kay's second extended play, and her first release in 2010. It was released throughout Japan on June 16, 2010.

== Background and promotion ==
=== Initial promotion and ringtone releases ===
Information on the album release was first revealed on February 9, 2010 when a new song "Flash" was announced on Kay's official website. It was used in commercials featuring Joe Odagiri for Canon IXY 10S digital cameras from February 19 onwards. The song was produced by the LA based production team of jACK. ringtone of the song was made available to download on Recochoku's Chaku-Uta on February 24. "Flash" will be used as the main promotional track for the album's release. One month later another new song "Victoria" was used as the commercial song for Tully's Coffee's Barista's Choice Black campaign from March. The song was also released as a ringtone on Recochoku's Chaku-Uta on May 19.

On April 2, 2010 the album was officially confirmed and given a release date of June 16. "Flash" will also be released on the same day as Kay's first concert DVD "Crystal Kay Live In NHK Hall: 10th Anniversary Tour CK10." The album features a cover of "Happy" by Michael Jackson as a tribute, as well as a song which Kay wrote herself. The limited DVD edition of "Flash" includes a live performance of "Girlfriend" with BoA.

=== Flash music video ===
In May 2010 open dance auditions for "Flash Dancers" took place, to which around 500 people applied. The eighteen chosen applicants were featured in the music video for "Flash" alongside Kay.

The music video for the song first aired on June 4. It was directed by Wataru Takeishi. and choreographed by Nazuki.

The video begins outside of an unused warehouse. After tearing caution tape, various people start to enter the building. The dancers are then seen performing solo, until they eventually come together in a large lit room and dance to the choreography with Kay until the video's ending. The lead dancer and Kay's interest in the "Flash" music video was Park Namyong, a dancer for Rain, who has also choreographed for the likes of Korean boy-band 2PM.

In between the dancing and choreographed scenes, various facial and body shots of Kay are shown in black and white.

== Track listing ==
| No. | Title | Length |
|---|---|---|
| 1. | "Intro (Genesis)" | 0:51 |
| 2. | "Flash" | 3:29 |
| 3. | "Victoria" | 3:50 |
| 4. | "Never Say Goodbye" | 3.59 |
| 5. | "Happy" | 4:00 |
| 6. | "I Pray" | 4:40 |
| 7. | "Outro" | 1:05 |
| Total length: | | 21:55 |

DVD
| No. | Title | Length |
|---|---|---|
| 1. | "Girlfriend (Live from Crystal Kay Live in NHK Hall: 10th Anniversary Tour CK10)" (featuring BoA) |
| 2. | "Crystal Kay Live in NHK Hall: 10th Anniversary Tour CK10" (Trailer) |

== Charts ==
"Flash" debuted at number 29 on the Oricon Weekly Chart after peaking at number 13 on the Daily Chart, and sold 3,197 that week. It charted for four weeks in total.

| Chart | Peak position |
|---|---|
| Billboard Japan Top Albums | 29 |
| Oricon Weekly Chart | 29 |
