= Anata no Soba de =

"Anata no Soba de" "あなたのそばで"

Single by Crystal Kay

from the album All Yours
- Released: May 16, 2007
- Recorded: 2007
- Genre: J-pop, R&B
- Length: 4:32
- Label: Epic
- Songwriter: Emi Nishida

Crystal Kay singles chronology
"Konna ni Chikaku de..." (2007)	"Anata no Soba de" "あなたのそばで" (2007)	"Namida no Saki ni" (2008)

"Anata no Soba de" is Crystal Kay's 21st single, it was released on May 16, 2007. It is Kay's third and final single from the album All Yours after "Konna ni Chikaku de..." in February. This single was seen as a summer love anthem which described the feelings of a lover feeling less closer to their loved one. This track exuded a pulsing R&B beat which certifies it as a more urban sounding song. The single only featured one track and thus was released at a lower price of ¥525.

== Track listing ==
No.	Title	Length
1.	"Anata no Soba de (あなたのそばで, Next to You)"

== Charts ==
Chart performance for "Anata no Soba de"
Chart (2007)	Peak position	First week sales	Total sales
Oricon Singles Chart	30	4,059	6,483
