= Spin the Music =

Studio album by Crystal Kay
- Released: December 8, 2010
- Recorded: 2009–2010
- Genre: Pop, R&B, dance-pop, adult contemporary
- Length: 51:24
- Label: Epic

Crystal Kay chronology
Flash (2010)	Spin the Music (2010)	Love Song Best (2011)

Singles from Spin the Music
- 1. "After Love (First Boyfriend)/Girlfriend" Released: August 12, 2009; 2. "Journey (Kimi to Futari de)" Released: November 24, 2010

Spin the Music is the ninth studio album by the Japanese singer Crystal Kay. It was released in Japan on December 8, 2010, and was her first studio album since Color Change! in 2008.

Two singles were taken from Spin the Music, "After Love (First Boyfriend)/Girlfriend" in 2009, and "Journey (Kimi to Futari de)" fifteen months later. The song "Time of Love" was used as the opening theme to the NHK drama Jūnen Saki mo Kimi ni Koishite, but did not receive an official single release. Two songs on the album were taken from the Flash EP, the title track and "I Pray".

== Track listing ==
No.	Title	Lyrics	Music	Produced by	Length
1.	"Journey (Kimi to Futari de)" (Journey ～君と二人で～, Together with You)	Crystal Kay, WolfJunk	WolfJunk	KAZUHIKO.M	3:59
2.	"After Love (First Boyfriend)" (featuring Kaname (Chemistry)	Craig Robert McConnell, Naomi Shobba Lee, Saoke Nishio	Craig Robert McConnell, Naomi Shobba Lee, Saoke Nishio	Masahiro Ohara	3:32
3.	"Kon'ya wa No.1" (今夜はNo.1, Tonight is No. 1)	Crystal Kay, H.U.B.	Crystal Kay, Oddity	Oddity	4:22
4.	"Kimi ga Ireba" (君がいれば, If You're Here)	H.U.B	TSUYOSHI	The Eklipse	4:47
5.	"Time of Love"	Crystal Kay, H.U.B.	Shin Kono	Shin Kono	5:44
6.	"I Pray"	Crystal Kay, H.U.B	Crystal Kay	Jin Nakamura	4:38
7.	"Goodbye"	Crystal Kay, J.Y. Park	J.Y. Park	J.Y. Park	3:48
8.	"Love or Game"	LiLy	Philippe-Marc Anquetil, Kelli Young, Jessica Pietreson, Zach Charlton	Philippe-Marc Anqueti	3:33
9.	"Hands Up"	Crystal Kay, H.U.B.	Hiten Bharadia, Noel Wayne, Sarah West	Noel Wayne	3:47
10.	"Flash"	Crystal Kay, H.U.B	Chad Richardson, Craig Robert McConnell, Andrew Grange	jACK	3:30
11.	"Thank You for Talkin' to Me Africa" (Yellow Magic Orchestra featuring Crystal Kay)		PD		5:36
12.	"I'll Be There"	H.U.B	Matthew Tishler, Robyn Newman	Matthew Tishler	4:03
Total length:					51:42

== Charts ==
The album entered the Oricon Weekly Chart at number 42 after peaking at number 28 on the Daily Chart, and sold 4,439 that week.

Chart	Peak position
Billboard Japan Top Albums	36
Oricon Weekly Albums Chart	42
