= Namida no Saki ni =

"Namida no Saki ni" "涙のさきに"

Single by Crystal Kay

from the album Color Change!
- B-side: "Girl Move On"
- Released: June 11, 2008
- Recorded: 2008
- Genre: J-Pop, R&B, pop-rock
- Label: Epic

Crystal Kay singles chronology
"Anata no Soba de" (2007)	"'Namida no Saki ni'" "涙のさきに" (2008)	"One" (2008)

"Namida no Saki ni" is Crystal Kay's 22nd single, it was released on June 11, 2008. It is Kay's first single in over a year, since the release of the single "Anata no Soba de" in May 2007. The title track was used as the commercial song for Tully's Coffee commercials throughout June. The song exhibited a new, rockier sound for the singer.

== Track listing ==
No.	Title	Length
1.	"Namida no Saki ni (涙のさきに, Beyond the Tears)"
2.	"Girl Move On"
3.	"Dream World (Soidog Mix)"
4.	"Namida no Saki ni (Soidog Mix) (涙のさきに, Beyond the Tears)"
5.	"Namida no Saki ni (Instrumental) (涙のさきに, Beyond the Tears)"

== Charts ==
Chart (2008)	Peak position	First week sales	Total sales
Oricon Singles Chart	42	2,287	3,587
