= Color Change! =

Studio album by Crystal Kay
- Released: August 6, 2008
- Recorded: 2007–2008
- Genres: J-pop, R&B
- Label: Epic

Crystal Kay chronology
Shining (2007)	Color Change! (2008)	Best of Crystal Kay (2009)

Singles from Color Change!
- 1. "Shining" Released: November 28, 2007; 2. "Namida no Saki ni" Released: June 11, 2008; 3. "One" Released: July 16, 2008

Color Change! is Crystal Kay's eighth studio album and was released on August 6, 2008. The album peaked at #6 on the Oricon daily chart and at #8 on the weekly chart. The album includes songs produced by Jimmy Jam & Terry Lewis ("Itoshiihito" and "I Can't Wait") and Bloodshy & Avant ("It's a Crime"). First pressings included a DVD which contained music videos for "Namida no Saki ni", "Shining" and "Dream World", from her previous album, All Yours. The title Color Change! refers to Kay's graduation in 2008. The album was eventually certified gold by RIAJ. Color Change! was the 289th best selling album of 2008 in Japan.

== Track listing ==
Color Change! track listing
No.	Title	Length
1.	"涙のさきに" (Namida no Saki ni; Beyond the Tears)	3:48
2.	"One"	4:03
3.	"Good Times"	4:20
4.	"Help Me Out"	3:46
5.	"Itoshiihito"	3:27
6.	"帰り道" (Kaerimichi; The Road Home)	4:18
7.	"トキノカケラ" (Toki no Kakera; Pieces of Time)	4:29
8.	"Time Goes By"	3:33
9.	"I Can't Wait"	4:39
10.	"Shining"	4:46
11.	"It's a Crime"	3:17
12.	"History"	4:03

== Charts ==
Chart performance for Color Change!
Release	Chart	Peak position	First week sales	Sales total
August 6, 2008	Oricon Daily Charts	6		
August 6, 2008	Oricon Weekly Charts	8	15,519	100,000
August 6, 2008	Oricon Yearly Charts	289		100,000

== Release history ==
Release history for Color Change!
Country	Date	Label	Format	Catalogue #
Japan	August 6, 2008	Epic	Compact disc	ESCL-3109/ESCL-3110
