= Tigarah =

Japanese house and dance music DJ and producer

Tigarah ティガラ
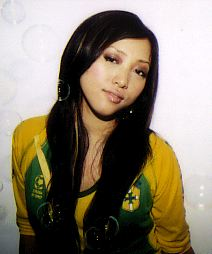

Background information
- Born: November 14, 1981 (age 44); Tokyo, Japan
- Genres: Grime, baile, funk, bass music
- Occupations: DJ, rapper, and record producer
- Years active: 2006 – present
- Label: Universal Music

Tigarah (Japanese: ティガラ) is a Japanese house and dance music DJ and producer. She studied politics at Keio University in Tokyo. Early in her career, she was the first Japanese Baile Funk rapper. She is now is a house and dance music producer based in Paris, France.

Tigarah's time in LA, along with her first EP, created a buzz which landed her "It-girl" status in the global market. Her features in publications such as Los Angeles Times, Dazed & Confused, Rolling Stone, VH1 and many more, leading to four of her songs being used for EA Sports, FIFA 2008 & 2009, FaceBreaker and Need for Speed: Carbon.

Tigarah has released two albums: The Funkeira goes GANG! (2010) and This World Is My Playground (2015) from Universal Music Japan. In 2016, her track with Lewis Cancut "Say OK featuring Tigarah" working with NLV Records in Australia, as well as her collaboration with British rock band Keane for their EP Night Train the cover track of YMO "You’ve got to help yourself" amplified her brand with her tracks being played on Diplo and Skrillex's Radio.

Tigarah was the face of Proactiv from 2016 to 2017. She wrote for Cosmopolitan Japan and ELLE girl. She has also been the face of E! Entertainment Japan since 2016.

She moved to Paris in 2019 and focused on her DJ career signing with RCA, Sony France. Her single "Je t’emmène au vent feat. Lea Paci" made a buzz on radio and was on Hits Français. Her music video has almost 2 million views.
