= After Love (First Boyfriend) / Girlfriend =

Single by Crystal Kay featuring Kaname (Chemistry) and BoA

from the album Spin the Music
- B-side: "Deaeta Kiseki"
- Released: August 12, 2009
- Recorded: 2008–2009
- Genre: Pop; R&B
- Length: 18:54
- Label: Epic
- Songwriter(s): Craig Robert McConnell, Naomi Shobha Lee, Saeko Nishio, STY

Crystal Kay singles chronology
"Eien / Universe / Believe in Love" (2009)	"After Love (First Boyfriend) / Girlfriend" (2009)	"Journey" (2010)

BoA singles chronology
"I Did It for Love" (2009)	"After Love (First Boyfriend) / Girlfriend" (2009)	"Bump Bump!" (2009)

"After Love (First Boyfriend) / Girlfriend" is Crystal Kay's 25th single. It was released on August 12, 2009.

== Background ==
It is Kay's second double A-side single, and her first since "Kirakuni/Together" in 2006. The single was announced on Kay's official website on July 1 which marks the tenth anniversary since the release of Kay's début single in 1999.

"After Love (First Boyfriend)" features Kaname from the J-Pop duo Chemistry. "After Love (First Boyfriend)" is a follow-up to Kay's 2003 single "Boyfriend: Part II" and used as the CM song for Itoen Tully's Coffee commercials throughout July. The song was written by Craig McConnell and Canadian artist Shobha, with Japanese lyrics by Crystal Kay.

"Girlfriend" features the South Korean artist BoA, with whom Kay is close friends. It was being used as the image song for the Japanese dub of He's Just Not That Into You starring Jennifer Aniston and Ben Affleck. "Deaeta Kiseki" was also a used as the CM song for Tully's Coffee commercials in December 2008 and was released digitally that month.

== Music video ==
The music video for the opening A-side, "After Love (First Boyfriend)" first aired on August 3 on Space Shower TV.

The video begins by switching between Kaname walking in the streets and Kay in a bedroom. As the music begins to play, Kay sings in the bedroom in places such as her bed, into the mirror, between various scenes of her in this room. She is then seen leaving the room and begins to walk down the streets, whilst Kaname continues to do the same. The two of them eventually meet at a bridge, and lean against the wall on either side.

However, the two of them seem oblivious to each other. Kaname turns around to see another woman and waves and walks over to her. The woman turns out to be Kay herself. As the two disappear, it is revealed that Kaname was just a memory of when her and Kaname were together. She then walks away smiling and the video comes to an end.

A special music video was released exclusively for Space Shower TV, entitled "After Love × Girlfriend Mix".

== Track listing ==
No.	Title	Lyrics	Music	Length
1.	"After Love (First Boyfriend)" (featuring Kaname)	Craig Robert McConnell, Naomi Shobha Lee, Saeko Nishio	Craig Robert McConnell, Naomi Shobha Lee, Saeko Nishio	3:32
2.	"Girlfriend" (featuring BoA)	STY	STY	3:44
3.	"Deaeta Kiseki" (出会えた奇跡 "Miracle Encounter")	Crystal Kay, Kiyo Tsurumi	Lisa Huang, Joey Carbone	4:22
4.	"After Love (First Boyfriend) (Instrumental)"			3:32
5.	"Girlfriend (Instrumental)"			3:44

== Live performances ==
Date	Performance	Show
August 14, 2009	After Love (First Boyfriend)	Music Japan
August 14, 2009	Girlfriend	Music Station
August 15, 2009	After Love (First Boyfriend)	Music Fighter

== Charting and release ==
After spending the week inside the top ten, "Girlfriend" entered at number 10 on the Recochoku Chaku Uta Full Weekly Chart. The single became Kay's fifteenth top forty single when it charted at number 31 for the Oricon Weekly Chart, selling 2,298 copies that week. The following week the single dropped to number 76, bringing the total to 3,461.

== Charts ==
Chart (2009)	Peak position
Japan Daily Singles (Oricon)	21
Japan Weekly Singles (Oricon)	31
Japan (Japan Hot 100)	20
Japan Hot Top Airplay (Billboard)	17
Japan Hot Singles Sales (Billboard)	35
