= Ito En =

Japanese drinks company

Ito En, Ltd. 株式会社伊藤園
- Type: Public K.K.
- Traded as: TYO: 2593
- Industry: Beverage
- Founded: 1966; 60 years ago
- Headquarters: Honmachi, Shibuya, Tokyo
- Products: Tea
- Website: Ito En

Ito En, Ltd. (株式会社伊藤園, Kabushiki Gaisha Itō En) (TYO: 2593) is a Japanese multinational drinks company specializing in tea production, distribution, and sales. Ito En is the largest green tea distributor in Japan. The Ito En Group includes subsidiaries based in Japan, the United States, Australia, Singapore, Taiwan, Thailand, Indonesia, China, Germany and Vietnam. Its products include unsweetened, bottled green tea and loose leaf tea. Ito En is currently the fourth-largest soft drink producer in Japan, after Coca-Cola, Suntory, and Kirin Beverage. Ito En also produces private label drinks for Seven & I Holdings Co. in Japan. In 2006, it acquired Tully's Coffee's business in Japan as a subsidiary. The company also has a line of flavored teas called Teas' Tea.

Ito En’s origins lie in a company called Japan Family Service Co., Ltd. The corporate logo that was designed for this company’s founding employed a four-leaf clover motif, expressing the hope of ensuring the happiness of its employees and their families. Based on this motif, the logo expresses the warmth, richness and lively vibrancy of nature and good health.

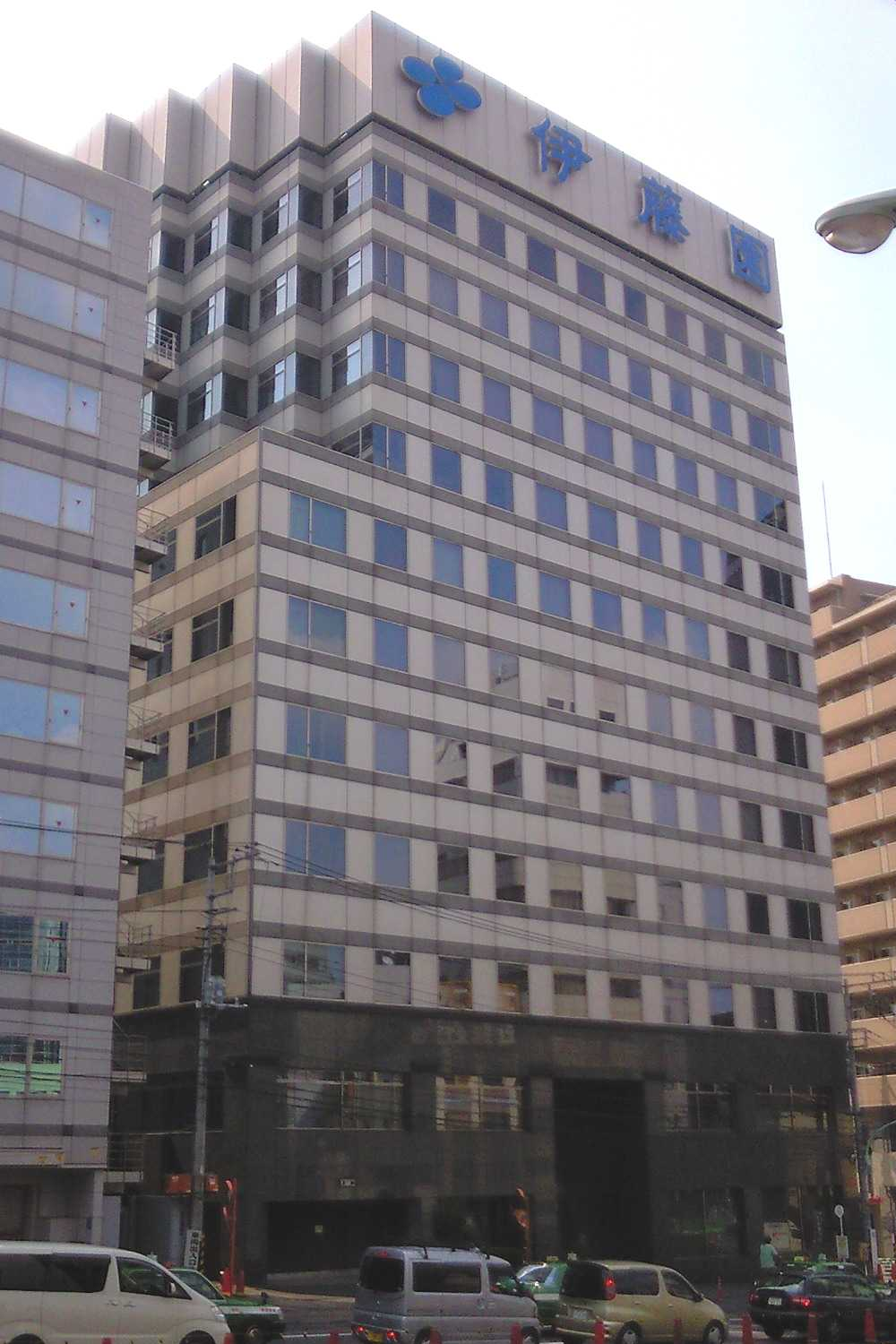
Headquarters

== Ito En (Hawaii) LLC ==
Ito En (USA) Inc. established local roots when Ito En, Ltd. purchased Shimoko and Sons, Inc. (S&S) in 1987. As Hawaii’s most popular maker of Saimin noodles and Aloha Maid Tropical Fruit Drinks, the fit was a natural one. The S&S line of products was sold to Sun Noodle Hawaii, LLC in 2006. In 2016, the Ito En (USA) Inc. business was dissolved and a new company, Ito En (Hawaii) LLC, was created in its place. Ito En (Hawaii) LLC offers the Hawaii market access to current seasonal Japan teas and beverages. Affiliate company, Ito En (North America) Inc. markets Asian teas and beverages to the mainland and Hawaii.

The company sells still drinks in Hawaii as Aloha Maid, and is a competitor to local Hawaiian Sun drinks.
