= Konna ni Chikaku de... =

"Konna ni Chikaku de…" "こんなに近くで…"

Single by Crystal Kay

from the album All Yours
- B-side: "Feel"
- Released: February 28, 2007
- Recorded: 2006–2007
- Genre: J-pop, R&B
- Label: Epic/Sony Records
- Songwriter: Sumiyo Mutsumi

Crystal Kay singles chronology
"Kitto Eien ni" (2007)	"Konna ni Chikaku de…" "こんなに近くで…" (2007)	"Anata no Soba de" (2007)

"Konna ni Chikaku de…" is Crystal Kay's 20th single, released on February 28, 2007. It was Kay's second single from the album All Yours after "Kitto Eien ni". This single was used for the ending credits of Japanese anime Nodame Cantabile. In the anime, the melody from the song is used in accompaniment on the piano throughout the anime as background music. The song was then replaced after the twelfth episode of the anime by the song "Sagittarius" by Suemitsu and the Nodame Orchestra.

== Track listing ==
"Konna ni Chikaku de…" CD single track listing
No.	Title	Length
1.	"Konna ni Chikaku de… (こんなに近くで…, This Close…)"
2.	"Feel"
3.	"Konna ni Chikaku de… (KZ Future Disko Remix) (こんなに近くで…, This Close…)"
4.	"Feel" (Singo. S Remix)
5.	"Konna ni Chikaku de… (Instrumental) (こんなに近くで…, This Close…)"

== Charts ==
Chart performance for "Konna ni Chikaku de…"
Chart (2007)	Peak position	First week wales	Total sales
Oricon Singles Chart	14	9,092	15,158
