= Crystal Style =

Studio album by Crystal Kay
- Released: March 2, 2005
- Recorded: 2004–2005
- Genre: J-pop, R&B
- Length: 60:10
- Label: Epic

Crystal Kay chronology
CK5 (2004)	Crystal Style (2005)	Call Me Miss... (2006)

Singles from Crystal Style
- 1. "Bye My Darling!" Released: November 17, 2004; 2. "Kiss" Released: January 26, 2005

Crystal Style is Crystal Kay's fifth studio album. Unlike Crystal's last three albums, this record is more pop oriented and features more foreign producers, including Ashley Ingram and Jamelia. It was released in two different versions: a regular CD edition and a limited CD+DVD edition containing an English version of "MAKE YOU MINE", a DVD with her recent music videos, and a slipcase. There were only two singles released leading up to Crystal's Style.

The album reached #2 on the Oricon weekly charts, where it charted for 31 weeks. As it sold 296,756 copies in 2005, it became the #44 best selling album of that year.

== Track listing ==
No.	Title	Lyrics	Music	Length
1.	"Bye My Darling!"	Crystal Kay, Satomi	AKIRA	4:03
2.	"Make You Mine"	Crystal Kay, Ashley Ingram, H.U.B	Crystal Kay, Ashley Ingram	2:41
3.	"Bet You Don't Know"	Crystal Kay, Ashley Ingram, H.U.B	Crystal Kay, Ashley Ingram	4:36
4.	"Kiss"	Satomi	Matsumoto Kiyoshi	5:30
5.	"Tears"	Saeko Nishio	Hisatsgu Noto	4:59
6.	"Love It Take It"	Natsumi Watanabe	Jamelia Davis, Sean Hosein, Dane Deviller	3:26
7.	"& Brand-New"	Natsumi Watanabe	Hiroaki Ohno	4:02
8.	"Flowers"	Soulshock & Karlin, Beckham	Soulshock & Karlin, Beckham	5:41
9.	"Magic"	Saeko Nishio	Troy Oliver, Yummy Sory	3:39
10.	"We Gonna Boogie"	T. Kura, MICHIKO	T. Kura, MICHIKO	3:59
11.	"Baby Cop (feat. Mummy-D)"	D. Sakama	T. Takeuchi, D. Sakama	5:07
12.	"MY Everything"	Crystal Kay, Ashley Ingram, Saeko Nishio	Crystal Kay, Ashley Ingram	5:35
13.	"Home Girls"	H.U.B	Shunsuke Minami	4:13
14.	"Make You Mine (English Version) (First press bonus track)"	Crystal Kay, Ashley Ingram, H.U.B	Crystal Kay, Ashley Ingram	2:39

== Charts ==
Release	Chart	Peak position	Sales total
March 2, 2005	Oricon Weekly Charts	2	296,756
March 2, 2005	Oricon Yearly Charts	44	296,756

== Release history ==
Country	Date	Label	Format	Catalogue #
Japan	March 2, 2005	Epic	Compact disc	ESCL-2648/ESCL-2649
