= Eternal Memories =

Single by Crystal Kay

from the album C.L.L Crystal Lover Light
- B-side: "Fly Away"
- Released: July 1, 1999
- Genre: J-pop
- Length: 5:10
- Label: Epic, Sony Music Entertainment Japan
- Composer: Yoko Kanno
- Lyricist: Hiroshi Ichikura

Crystal Kay singles chronology
"Eternal Memories" (1999)	"Teenage Universe: Chewing Gum Baby" (1999)

Music video
- "Eternal Memories" on YouTube

"Eternal Memories" is Crystal Kay's debut single, released on July 1, 1999. Kay was thirteen years old when this single was released. The title track was written by Yoko Kanno, a well-known Japanese composer and arranger. "Eternal Memories" was first heard in a commercial for "Vitamin Water" and was later recorded in full. Despite peaking at #47, "Eternal Memories" has since become Kay's eighth best selling single.

== Track listing ==
1. Eternal Memories - 5:10
2. Fly Away - 4:58
3. Fly Away (Acapella) - 4:33 (12" single exclusive)
4. Eternal Memories (Instrumental) - 5:07 (12" single exclusive)

== Charts ==
"Eternal Memories" debuted on the Oricon Singles Chart at No. 47. It charted for a further four weeks.

Chart (1999)	Peak position	Total sales
Oricon Singles Chart	47	19,990
