= Start Again EP =

EP by Crystal Kay
- Released: February 24, 2023
- Genre: Jazz
- Length: 12:04
- Label: Virgin
- Producer: Emi Meyer

Crystal Kay chronology
| I Sing (2021) | Start Again EP (2023) | A2Z (2023) |

Singles from Start Again EP
- 1. "Start Again" Released: February 3, 2023; 2. "How You Feel" Released: February 10, 2021; 3. "Spark" Released: February 17, 2023

Start Again EP is an extended play by Japanese singer Crystal Kay, released on February 24, 2023, by Virgin Music. All the songs from the EP are featured on the Amazon Prime Video original drama, A2Z.

== Background ==
In 2020, Crystal Kay returned to performing in a Japanese version of Pippin, which gave her a nomination for Best Actress at the 2020 Yomiuri Theater Awards. She released three singles in 2022: "Gimme Some" featuring Japanese rapper Daichi Yamamoto, "No Pressure" featuring Japanese singer VivaOla and "Love Me". In January 2023, Kay revealed she would be providing songs for A2Z, an Amazon Prime Video original Japanese drama show. The A2Z soundtrack additionally was announced, with four songs provided by Kay. On February 1, Kay announced she would be releasing a digital EP, titled Start Again EP. Kay revealed the EP would include a cover song of "One Flight Down". In an interview with Music Natalie, Kay stated she co-wrote songs with Emi Meyer, a Japanese jazz singer-songwriter. Kay additionally revealed all the songs on the EP would be recorded in English, rather than in Japanese.

== Track listing ==
All tracks produced by Emi Meyer.

| No. | Title | Writer(s) | Length |
|---|---|---|---|
| 1. | "Start Again" | Emi Meyer | 3:06 |
| 2. | "How You Feel" | Meyer; Crystal Kay Williams | 3:03 |
| 3. | "Spark" | Meyer; Williams | 2:46 |
| 4. | "One Flight Down" | Jesse Harris | 3:07 |
| Total length: | | | 12:04 |

== Personnel ==
Credits adapted from Tidal.

=== Musicians ===
- Emi Meyer – production, songwriting (1–3)
- Yumi Shimazu – cello (1, 2)
- Crystal Kay Williams – vocals (all tracks), songwriting (2, 3)
- Masaki Hayashi – piano (all tracks)
- Kintaro Hagiya – viola (1, 2)
- Daehyok Jang – violin (1, 2)
- Erika Aoyama – violin (1, 2)
- Tetsuo Sakurai – bass (2–4)
- Sakata Manabu – drums (2–4)
- Tanaka Kunikazu – bass flute (2)
- Ishii Masayuki – guitar (3)
- Jesse Harris – songwriting (4)

=== Technical ===
- Emi Meyer – recording arrangement (all tracks)
- Yoshiaki Onishi – mixing, engineering (all tracks)
- Daisuke Kawaguchi – string arrangement (1, 2)

== Release history ==
Release history and formats for Start Again EP
| Region | Date | Format(s) | Label | Ref. |
|---|---|---|---|---|
| Various | February 24, 2023 | Digital download; streaming | Virgin; Universal | |
