= Call Me Miss... =

Call Me Miss…

Studio album by Crystal Kay
- Released: February 22, 2006
- Recorded: 2005–2006
- Genres: J-pop, R&B
- Label: Epic

Crystal Kay chronology
Crystal Style (2005)	Call Me Miss… (2006)	All Yours (2007)

Singles from Call Me Miss…
- 1. "Koi ni Ochitara (恋におちたら)" Released: May 18, 2005; 2. "Two as One" Released: October 5, 2005; 3. "Kirakuni / Together" Released: February 8, 2006

Call Me Miss... (stylized as Call me Miss...) is the sixth studio album by Japanese recording artist Crystal Kay. This was released just two weeks after her previous single "Kirakuni / Together" and in two different versions: a regular CD only edition and a limited CD+DVD edition that comes with an orchestra version of "Kiss" as well as a DVD of the PVs and live performances of two of Kay's big hits, "Koi ni Ochitara" and "Two As One" (with both these reaching #2 on the Oricon weekly charts).

== CD track listing ==
No.	Title	Length
1.	"Baby Girl"	4:07
2.	"Kirakuni"	4:16
3.	"恋におちたら (Koi ni Ochitara; If I Fall in Love)"	4:29
4.	"Hero"	3:40
5.	"テレパシー (Telepathy)"	4:37
6.	"KTK"	4:13
7.	"I Know"	4:22
8.	"Nobody But You"	4:34
9.	"Together"	3:40
10.	"Fly to You"	4:49
11.	"きっと (Kitto; Certainly)"	3:57
12.	"Two as One (Crystal Kay x Chemistry)"	3:44
13.	"Happy Life"	3:49
14.	"涙があふれても (Namida ga Afuretemo; Overflowing Tears)"	5:14
15.	"Kiss (Orchestra Version)"	5:19

== DVD track listing ==
No.	Title	Length
1.	"恋におちたら (Video) (Koi ni Ochitara; If I Fall in Love)"
2.	"Two As One (Video) (Crystal Kay x Chemistry)"
3.	"恋におちたら (Live Version) (Koi ni Ochitara; If I Fall in Love)"
4.	"Two As One (Live Version) (Crystal Kay x Chemistry)"

== Charts ==
Release	Chart	Peak position	First week sales	Sales total
February 22, 2006	Oricon Daily Charts	1		
February 22, 2006	Oricon Weekly Charts	2	116,050	250,698
February 22, 2006	Oricon Yearly Charts	50		250,698

== Release history ==
Country	Date	Label	Format	Catalogue #
Japan	February 22, 2006	Epic	Compact disc	ESCL-2798/ESCL-2799
