= Vivid (Crystal Kay album) =

- Limited edition cover.

Studio album by Crystal Kay
- Released: June 27, 2012
- Recorded: 2011–2012
- Genre: Pop; R&B; dance-pop
- Label: Delicious Deli
- Producer: Bachlogic; Famties; Dsign Music

Crystal Kay chronology
Love Song Best (2011)	Vivid (2012)	Shine (2015)

Singles from Vivid
- 1. "Superman" Released: December 14, 2011; 2. "Delicious na Kinyoubi / Haru Arashi" Released: February 29, 2012; 3. "Forever" Released: June 6, 2012

Vivid is the tenth Japanese language studio album (12th overall) by Japanese singer-songwriter Crystal Kay. The album served as her first release under Universal Music Japan sublabel Delicious Deli Records after Kay departed from her former record label, Epic Records Japan.

== Background information ==
After the disappointing sales of her ninth Japanese album, Spin the Music, Kay announced that she had decided to leave Sony Music Japan who she had been signed to since the age of twelve and under which all her previous albums had been released. She moved to Delicious Deli Records under the Universal label and was working on her tenth Japanese album. The album was preceded by three singles: "Superman", which was used in the Japanese drama Boku to Star no 99 Nichi; "Delicious na Kinyoubi / Haru Arashi"; and "Forever", which was released on June 6, 2012.

== Track listing ==
CD
No.	Title	Lyrics	Music	Arranger(s)	Length
1.	"Forever"	michico	T.Kura, michico	T.Kura	4:18
2.	"Be Mine"	michico	T.Kura, michico	T.Kura	4:05
3.	"Take It Outside"	Christian F.J.Buettner, Marcello Pagin, C.C.Sheffield, Nicholas "RAS" Furlong, Sumiyo Mutsumi, Crystal Kay	Christian F.J.Buettner		3:15
4.	"Yo Yo"	Anthony Whiting, Emily Philips, Chad Richardson, Kaji Katsura, Crystal Kay	Anthony Whiting, Emily Philips		3:08
5.	"Come Back to Me"	Crystal Kay, Anne Judith Wik, Ronny Svendsen, Nermin Harambasic, Robin Jenssen	Crystal Kay, Dsign Music		3:43
6.	"What We Do"	Anne Judith Wik, Ronny Svendsen, Nermin Harambasic, Robin Jenssen, Hallgeir Rustan	Dsign Music		3:54
7.	"Superman"	TIGER, Crystal Kay	BACHLOGIC, FAST LANE, Darren Martyn		3:48
8.	"Memory Box"	Crystal Kay, H.U.B.	T-SK, Christian Fast, Didrik Thott, Maria Marcus		4:39
9.	"Haru Arashi"	Crystal Kay	Christian Fast, Oscar Merner, Henrik Nordenback		3:51
10.	"Fly High"	Yusuke Toriumi, Crystal Kay	BACHLOGIC, Darren Martyn		3:23
11.	"Delicious na Kinyoubi"	Crystal Kay, H.U.B.	BACHLOGIC, Erik Lidbom		4:07
12.	"Rising Sun"	Tebey, Shawn Desman, Tommy Lee James, Sumiyo Mutsumi, Crystal Kay	Tebey, Shawn Desman		3:43
13.	"Haru Arashi" (Kazuhiko Maeda Remix)	Crystal Kay	Christian Fast, Oscar Merner, Henrik Nordenback	Kazuhiko Maeda (arrangement & remix)	4:22
14.	"Forever" (Kazuhiko Maeda Remix)	michico	T.Kura, michico	Kazuhiko Maeda (arrangement & remix)	5:05

DVD
No.	Title	Length
1.	"Forever" (Music video)
2.	"Delicious na Kinyoubi" (Music video)	4:19
3.	"Superman" (Music video)	3:50
4.	"Forever" (Making of)

== Charts and sales ==
=== Charts ===
Chart	Peak position
Oricon Daily Albums Chart	24
Oricon Weekly Albums Chart	35

=== Sales ===
Chart	First week sales	Sales total
Oricon Weekly Charts	3,263	4,694

== Release history ==
Country	Date	Label	Format	Catalogue No. of the Regular Version	Catalogue No. of the Limited Version
Japan	June 27, 2012	Delicious Deli	CD, digital download	UICV-1019	UICV-9020
