= Kitto Eien ni =

"Kitto Eien ni" "きっと永遠に"

Single by Crystal Kay

from the album All Yours
- B-side: "As One"
- Released: January 17, 2007
- Recorded: 2006–2007
- Genre: Pop, adult contemporary
- Length: 5:02
- Label: Epic
- Songwriter(s): Emi Nashida ("Kitto Eien ni"); EMI K. Lynn ("As One")

Crystal Kay singles chronology
""Kirakuni/ Together"" (2006)	"Kitto Eien ni" "きっと永遠に" (2007)	"Konna ni Chikaku de…" (2008)

"Kitto Eien ni" is pop singer Crystal Kay's nineteenth single. It was released on January 17, 2007 as the first single for Kay's seventh studio album All Yours. This was Kay's first single since February 2006. The song, a ballad, was used as the ending theme of the live-action film adaptation of the manga Boku wa Imōto ni Koi o Suru (僕は妹に恋をする, lit. I Love My Younger Sister) by Kotomi Aoki which stars Jun Matsumoto and Nana Eikura as Yori and Iku, fraternal twins who fall in love despite being siblings.

The single's B-side "As One" was used as J-Wave's Christmas campaign song in December 2008.

== Track listing ==
"Kitto Eien ni" CD single track listing
No.	Title	Length
1.	"Kitto Eien ni (きっと永遠に, Surely for All Eternity)"	5:02
2.	"As One"	5:04
3.	"Kitto Eien ni (Studio Apartment Remix) (きっと永遠に, Surely for All Eternity)"	7:38
4.	"As One" (Remix)	4:33
5.	"Kitto Eien ni (Instrumental) (きっと永遠に, Surely for All Eternity)"	5:02

== Charts ==
Chart performance for "Kitto Eien ni"
Chart (2007)	Peak position	First week wales	Total sales
Oricon Singles Chart	12	7,723	19,615
