= All Yours (Crystal Kay album) =

Studio album by Crystal Kay
- Released: June 20, 2007
- Recorded: 2006–2007
- Genres: J-pop, R&B
- Label: Epic

Crystal Kay chronology
Call Me Miss… (2006)	All Yours (2007)	Shining (2007)

Singles from All Yours
- 1. "Kitto Eien ni" Released: January 17, 2007; 2. "Konna ni Chikaku de…" Released: February 28, 2007; 3. "Anata no Soba de" Released: May 16, 2007

All Yours is the seventh studio album by the Japanese singer Crystal Kay, released by Epic Records Japan, on June 20, 2007.

First editions included a DVD section, with the three music videos from the album's singles, as well as "Konna ni Chikaku de…" performed live for a special Nodame orchestra concert at the Tokyo International Forum on February 28, 2007. All Yours was re-released as a "Winter Special Package" in November 2007 with a new cover.

It is her only number-one album and has been certified gold by the RIAJ for shipments of over 100,000 copies in Japan.

== Track listing ==
All Yours track listing
No.	Title	Length
1.	"こんなに近くで…" (Konna ni Chikaku de…; So Close…)	4:03
2.	"Dream World"	3:45
3.	"Anytime"	4:43
4.	"あなたのそばで" (Anata no Soba de; Next to You)	4:32
5.	"Cherish"	4:08
6.	"Still"	4:58
7.	"Butterfly's Garden"	3:40
8.	"きっと永遠に" (Kitto Eien ni; Surely Forever)	5:02
9.	"Escalator"	4:58
10.	"Sugar Rain"	4:46
11.	"I Wanna Be"	4:02
12.	"Lonely Girl"	4:00
13.	"Midnight Highway"	3:53
14.	"Last Kiss"	4:53

== Charts ==
Chart performance for All Yours
Chart (2007)	Peak position	First week sales	Sales total
Oricon Daily Charts	1		
Oricon Weekly Charts	1	51,211	136,841

== Certifications ==
Certifications for All Yours
Region	Certification	Certified units/sales
Japan (RIAJ)	Gold	100,000^{^}
^{^} Shipments figures based on certification alone.

== Release history ==
Release history for All Yours
Country	Date	Label	Format	Catalogue #
Japan	June 20, 2007	Epic	Compact disc	ESCL-2998/ESCL-2999
