= One (Crystal Kay song) =

Single by Crystal Kay

from the album Color Change!
- B-side: "Suki (すき)"
- Released: July 16, 2008 (Japan)
- Recorded: 2008
- Genre: J-Pop, R&B
- Label: Epic

Crystal Kay singles chronology
"Namida no Saki ni" (2008)	"'One'" (2008)	"Eien / Universe / Believe in Love" (2009)

Alternative covers

"One" is Crystal Kay's 24th single, it was released on July 16, 2008. On March 3, 2008, it was revealed that Kay was chosen to sing the theme song to the eleventh Pokémon film Giratina and the Sky Warrior. Kay also played the voice of Nurse Joy's Chansey in the film. The film's producers had apparently been considering the singer since 2001, when she sang "Lost Child" with Shinichi Osawa and Hiroshi Fujiwara for the soundtrack of the drama Satorare. The film was released in Japan on July 19, three days after the release of the single.

== Track listing ==
Regular edition

No.	Title	Length
1.	"One"
2.	"Suki (すき, Like)"
3.	"One (Cornelius Remix)"
4.	"One (Dexpistols Remix)"
5.	"One (Instrumental)"

Pokémon edition

No.	Title	Length
1.	"One"
2.	"One (with Pikachu & Shaymin) (ピカチュウ&シェイミ)"
3.	"One (Karaoke) (カラオケ)"

== Charts ==
Chart (2008)	Peak position	First week sales	Total sales
Oricon Singles Chart	32	2,237	6,522
