= Crystal Kay =

Korean-American singer, songwriter, actress and radio host (born 1986)

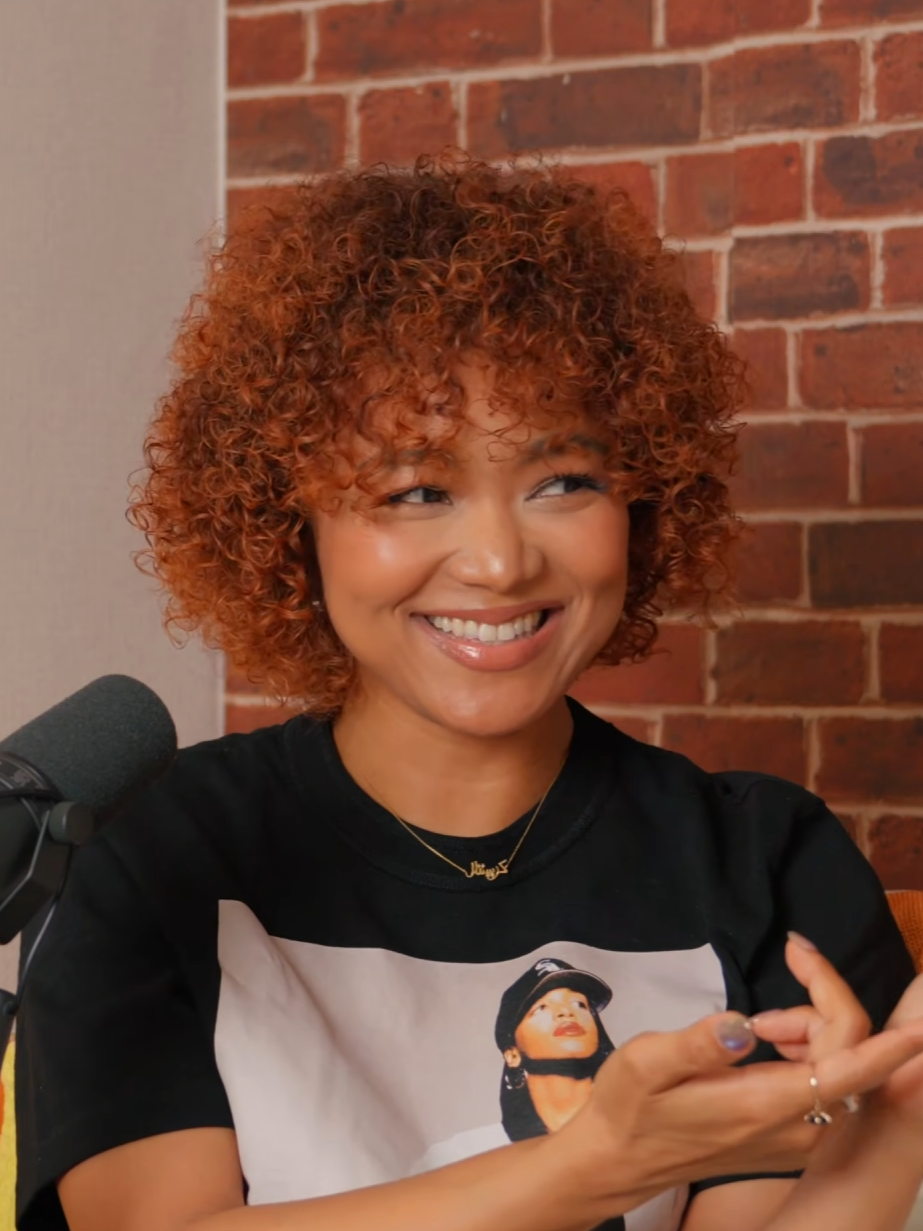
- Kay in 2026
- Born: Crystal Kay Williams; February 26, 1986 (age 40); Yokohama, Kanagawa, Japan
- Other names: Kuri(-chan), CK
- Occupations: Singer; songwriter; actress; radio host
- Years active: 1999–present
- Musical career
- Genres: Pop; R&B; rock; dance
- Instrument: Vocals
- Labels: Epic; Delicious Deli; Virgin
- Website: www.universal-music.co.jp/crystal-kay/

Crystal Kay Williams (クリスタル・ケイ・ウィリアムズ, Kurisutaru Kei Wiriamuzu; born February 26, 1986) is a Japanese singer, songwriter, actress and radio host.

After releasing her first single, "Eternal Memories" (1999), Crystal Kay gained fame for her third studio album, Almost Seventeen (2002), which debuted at number 2 on the Japanese Oricon charts. Almost Seventeen eventually sold over 400,000 copies and was certified platinum by the Recording Industry Association of Japan. Crystal Kay, formerly signed to Epic Records, a sub-label of Sony Music Japan for 12 years, suddenly transferred to Delicious Deli Records, a sub-label of Universal Music Japan in 2011.

As of April 2021, she has released thirteen albums. Her seventh studio album, All Yours (2007) became Crystal Kay's only number-one release in her career when it debuted on top of the Oricon chart in June 2007. Throughout her career, Crystal Kay has collaborated with M-Flo and BoA, Chemistry as well as other well-known recording artists. With over 5 million records sold to date, Crystal Kay is one of the best-selling musicians in Japan.

== Early life and education ==
Crystal Kay was born and raised in Yokohama in Kanagawa Prefecture to a South Korean mother and an African-American father. Her father was a bassist from New Jersey and a sailor in the United States Navy stationed in Yokosuka, Japan. Her mother was a 23-year-old professional singer with one album while her father played music as a hobby. As a child, Crystal Kay met artists such as Diana Ross and Bobby Brown through her parents taking her to shows.

Crystal Kay attended Nile C. Kinnick High School at the Yokosuka military base, and Sophia University. She briefly studied the Korean language in Seoul, learning how to read and write hangul, but does not speak Korean. Crystal Kay is fluent in English and Japanese, the latter influencing and making a regular appearance in her songs. She has also studied French. Crystal Kay has cited Janet Jackson, Brandy, Aaliyah and Michael Jackson as her biggest influences. In Japan she cites the acts of producer Tetsuya Komuro as her J-pop influences, particularly Speed and Namie Amuro.

== Recording career ==
=== 1999–2001: Debut and subsequent image change ===
Crystal Kay began singing for TV commercials as child from the age of 4. At the age of 11 years old, Crystal Kay signed to the label Epic Records in Japan when a jingle she recorded for TV CM for Vitamin water garnered attention. One year later the jingle was expanded into her debut single "Eternal Memories", on July 1, 1999. Despite peaking at number 47, "Eternal Memories" has since become Crystal Kay's eighth best-selling single. 1999 saw the release of two more singles, "Teenage Universe (Chewing Gum Baby)" on September 8 and "Komichi no Hana" on November 3, the former peaking at number 47 and the latter at number 80.

Crystal Kay's first studio album, C.L.L Crystal Lover Light was released on March 23, 2000. This album is noted by fans to have a more indie and acoustic feel as opposed to her later albums which mainly come under the genres of pop and R&B. Crystal Kay was only 13 years old when this album was released.

C.L.L Crystal Lover Light debuted at number 60 on the Oricon charts. A fourth single was released on the same day as C.L.L Crystal Lover Light, "Shadows of Desire". Because of its release date it became Crystal Kay's first single to fail to chart. "Shadows of Desire" was Crystal Kay's first A-side to be sung entirely in English.

After a year-long period of inactivity, Crystal Kay returned to the music scene with the single "Lost Child". The single, which was a collaboration with Shinichi Osawa and Hiroshi Fujiwara was released on February 15, 2001, and reached number 55 on its debut week. Despite Crystal Kay only being credited as a featured artist on the song, it was still featured on her next album, 637: Always and Forever. Her fifth single "Girl's Night" came three months later on May 9, 2001. The single saw the introduction of urban influences in Crystal Kay's music. Despite this new style, the single peaked at number 100. One of the b-sides, "Make Me Whole" was a cover of the Amel Larrieux song of the same name. Crystal Kay's next single, "Ex-Boyfriend", was released on July 4, 2001. It featured rapper Verbal of M-Flo. The single was a success for Crystal Kay, peaking at number 44, and became her best selling single at the time of its release. Crystal Kay released her sophomore effort on August 22, 2001, 637: Always and Forever. The album became Crystal Kay's first album to reach the top twenty of the Oricon chart when it debuted at number 19, and sold 15,640 copies in its first week. Crystal Kay finished off 2001 with her seventh single, "Think of U", released on November 28, 2001. The single was Christmas-themed. It debuted and peaked at number 60.

=== 2002–2006: Rise in popularity ===
Nine months after her last single, Crystal Kay released her eighth single, "Hard to Say", on August 7, 2002, and sold over double than her previous best selling single, "Ex-Boyfriend". It became her first top thirty single when it debuted peaked at number 26 on the Oricon chart. The single was followed by the release of Crystal Kay's next single "Girl U Love" and her third studio album Almost Seventeen, on October 23, 2002. Almost Seventeen became Crystal Kay's breakthrough album, exceeding expectations and debuting at number 2 on the charts behind Mai Kuraki, selling 51,360 in its first week. The album spent a year on the charts, quickly being certified platinum by RIAJ. Three months later Crystal Kay released "Boyfriend (Part II)" on January 22, 2003. It peaked at number 23. Her next single came five months later, and was another collaboration with M-Flo. The single, called "I Like It", was released as "Crystal Kay loves m-flo" and was notably the first in a long-running hit series for m-flo. It was also Crystal Kay's first top ten hit.

"I Like It" peaked at number 8, becoming Crystal Kay's first top ten hit and eventually sold around 50,000 copies. Another single, "Candy" was released a month before her fourth studio album, 4 Real, on October 22, 2003. "Candy" debuted inside the top thirty of the Oricon charts at number 21, her fourth single in-a-row to do so. 4 Real was released on November 27, 2003, along with Crystal Kay's thirteenth single, "Can't Be Stopped". 4 Real debuted at number 6 on the charts behind household names in Japan such as Aiko, Do As Infinity and Mika Nakashima and sold 86,310 copies in its first week.

Crystal Kay's first English-language album, Crystal Kay (released as Natural: World Premiere Album in Japan), was released several weeks before 4 Real on November 7, 2003, in Asian territories including South Korea, Taiwan, Hong Kong and Thailand. The album was her first to be released outside Japan, and compiled English language songs from her previously released albums and singles, and covers of Gladys Knight, Cyndi Lauper and Judy Garland songs. Crystal Kay performed at the 2003 Mnet Music Video Festival in Seoul, South Korea to promote its release. It was her first performance outside Japan.

On May 12, 2004, released her fourteenth single, "Motherland", the first of two that year. "Motherland" was used as the third ending theme for the anime adaption of Fullmetal Alchemist. It was the ending theme from episodes 26 to 41. The single debuted at number 9 on the Oricon chart, her second single to debut in the top ten. Just under two months after "Motherland", Crystal Kay released her first compilation album, CK5, which was released on June 30, 2004, featuring a selection of tracks from Crystal Kay's four previous studio albums, as well as her latest single, "Motherland". The album celebrates Crystal Kay's fifth anniversary since the release of her debut single "Eternal Memories" in 1999, hence the title. CK5 peaked at number 2 on the weekly chart and charted for 49 weeks, eventually being certified platinum by RIAJ. Another single, "Bye My Darling!" was released on November 17, and peaked at number 40 on the Oricon chart. It was Crystal Kay's final release of 2004.

The single "Kiss" started off 2005 for Crystal Kay. It was released on January 26, 2005, and peaked at number 10 on the Oricon chart. The single had longevity at eventually became her second best-selling single. "Kiss" was the CM song for NTT DoCoMo "Music Porter". "Kiss" was written by the same songwriter of the ballad "Yuki no Hana" by Mika Nakashima. Crystal Kay's fifth studio album, Crystal Style followed two months later on March 2, 2005. The album debuted at number 2 and sold 296,756 copies. The album was the 44th best-selling album of 2005 in Japan. Crystal Kay released her seventeenth single, "Koi ni Ochitara", on May 18, 2005, which was used as the theme song for the drama Koi ni Ochitara: Boku no Seikō no Himitsu. The single is currently the best-selling single of her career, selling 295,456 copies, and Crystal Kay has sai that it changed the focus of her career away from R&B and towards J-Pop. In its first week it sold 73,717 copies, in its second week it dropped to number 4 and sold 51,546 copies, and in the third week it fell one place to number 5, selling a further 38,302 copies. Crystal Kay's next single was a collaboration with the R&B duo Chemistry called "Two as One". The single was released on October 5, 2005, and peaked at number 2 on the Oricon charts, much like "Koi ni Ochitara" earlier that year. "Two as One" was released as Crystal Kay × Chemistry.

On February 8, 2006, Crystal Kay released "Kirakuni" / "Together", her nineteenth single and the second A-side to be sung entirely in English. This single was recorded in the U.S. with producers Jam & Lewis, who are known for working with the likes of Crystal Kay's idol Janet Jackson and Mariah Carey. Crystal Kay has stated that working with them was the personal highlight of her career and was landed on Crystal Kay as a surprise by her management. The recording took place over a hectic 3 nights in Los Angeles. The second A-side "Together" was used as the theme song in Japan for the 2006 Winter Olympics in Turin. The single debuted at number 27. Two weeks later Crystal Kay released her sixth studio album Call Me Miss... on February 22, 2006. In its first week, Call Me Miss... debuted at number 2 on the Oricon chart as well as number 9 on the World Album Chart, selling 116,050 copies that week. It has since been certified platinum by RIAJ and was the 50th best selling album of 2006 in Japan.

=== 2007–2008: First number-one ===
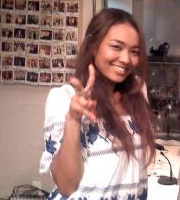
Crystal Kay at a radio station in 2008

After about a year's break, Crystal Kay released the single "Kitto Eien ni" on January 17, 2007. "Kitto Eien ni" was used as the ending theme of the film Boku wa Imōto ni Koi o Suru, starring Jun Matsumoto. The single debuted at number 12 and charted for seven weeks, selling 19,615 copies. Crystal Kay's twenty-first single, "Konna ni Chikaku de...", was released on February 28, 2007. It was used as the ending theme to the anime adaption of the manga Nodame Cantabile. The single debuted at number 14 on the Oricon chart and charted for eight weeks, selling 15,158 copies to date. "Konna ni Chikaku de..." was performed live for the special Nodame Orchestra concert at the Tokyo International Forum on the single's release date. Another single, "Anata no Soba de", was released on May 16, 2007. The single only featured one track and thus was sold at the lower price of ¥525 in Japan. This single was the CM song for Menard Facial Salon. Crystal Kay released her seventh studio album All Yours a month later on June 20, 2007.

The album's theme was love. The track "Lonely Girl" was featured on the Japanese airings of the American dramatic television series Lost and featured on the soundtrack to the third series in Japan. The second track on All Yours, "Dream World", was used to promote the "Barista's Special" for Tully's Coffee. The album debuted at number 1, selling 51,211 copies in its first week. All Yours was Crystal Kay's first number one release. The album has sold 136,841 copies and charted for nine weeks.

On November 28, 2007, Crystal Kay released her first EP, Shining. The EP had a Christmas theme and featured the title track "Shining" as well as a second new track "Snowflake" and the previously released tracks "Happy 045 Xmas" and "No More Blue Christmas", originally featured on Natural: World Premiere Album. It debuted at number 21 on the Oricon chart. "Shining" was used as the CM song for "PARCO X'MAS 2007" throughout the Christmas period. Crystal Kay also starred in the commercial, in which she was seen "flying" on a reindeer.

On March 3, 2008, it was revealed that Crystal Kay was chosen to sing the theme song to the 2008 Pokémon film Giratina to Sora no Hanataba: Sheimi. She also played the voice of "Nurse Joy's Chansey" in the film. The film's producers had apparently been considering the singer since 2001, when she sang "Lost Child" with Shinichi Osawa and Hiroshi Fujiwara for the soundtrack of the film Satorare. As expected a single was released. However, it was not the recently announced Pokémon theme song, but a different single entitled "Namida no Saki ni". "Namida no Saki ni" was released on June 11, 2008. It was Crystal Kay's first single in over a year, since the release of the single "Anata no Soba de" on May 16, 2007. "Namida no Saki" was used as the CM song for Tully's Coffee commercials throughout June 2008. This song exhibited a new, pop-rock sound for the singer. The single debuted at number 29 on the Oricon daily chart and eventually debuted at number 42 on the weekly chart. To date, the single has sold 3,587 copies. One month later on July 16, 2008, the Pokémon single, "One", was finally released. "One" debuted at number 25 on the daily chart and debuted at number 32 on the weekly chart, selling 2,237 copies. To date, "One" has sold 6,522 copies. Crystal Kay graduated in sociology from Sophia University in 2008, allowing her to concentrate on her career full-time. For her eighth studio album Color Change! Crystal Kay had songs produced by Bloodshy & Avant and Jam & Lewis. Crystal Kay had previously worked with Jam & Lewis in 2006. The album was released on August 6, 2008. The title Color Change! reflected from Crystal Kay's graduation from Sophia University that year. Color Change! peaked at number 6 on the Oricon daily chart and number 8 on the weekly chart, selling 15,519 copies in its first week. The album sold 33,290 copies after seven weeks on the charts. Color Change! was eventually certified gold by RIAJ. Color Change! was the 289th best selling album of 2008 in Japan.

=== 2009–2010: Ten years in the industry ===
On February 18, 2009, Crystal Kay was a featured artist with Verbal of M-Flo on the song "Universe" with South Korean singer BoA from her single Eien/Universe/Believe in Love. The single peaked at number 8 and has sold 21,789 copies. On May 15, 2009, it was announced that Crystal Kay and Jin Akanishi, from the boyband KAT-TUN, had written a duet called "Wonder". The song was first performed by Akanishi on the KAT-TUN's concert tour in 2009. This was the second time that Crystal Kay sang with him, the first being during her second appearance on KAT-TUN's variety show, Cartoon KAT-TUN. On August 12, Crystal Kay released her twenty-fourth single, "After Love (First Boyfriend)" / "Girlfriend". The single was announced on Crystal Kay's official website on July 1, 2009, which marks the tenth anniversary since the release of Crystal Kay's debut single in 1999. "After Love (First Boyfriend)" features Kaname from the J-pop duo Chemistry. "After Love (First Boyfriend)" is a follow-up to Crystal Kay's 2003 single "Boyfriend (Part II)" and used as the CM song for Tully's Coffee commercials throughout July 2009. "After Love" was written by Craig McConnell and Canadian artist Shobha, with Japanese lyrics by Crystal Kay. "Girlfriend", featuring the Korean artist BoA with whom Crystal Kay is reportedly close friends, was used as the image song for the Japanese dubbed release of the feature film He's Just Not That Into You starring Jennifer Aniston and Ben Affleck. The single's b-side, "Deaeta Kiseki", was released digitally in December 2008 and was also used as the CM song for Tully's Coffee that month. "After Love (First Boyfriend)" / "Girlfriend" was Crystal Kay's second double A-side single, and her first since "Kirakuni" / "Together" in 2006. The single landed on the Oricon Daily Chart at peak position number 21 and on the Oricon Weekly Chart at number 31. On September 2, 2009, Crystal Kay released her second compilation album, entitled Best of Crystal Kay. The collection featured over thirty tracks from her discography. Best of Crystal Kay was also released with a "limited edition" disc containing four new songs, including "Step by Step", produced by Yasutaka Nakata of Capsule. It was used as the theme song for "Janguru Taitei" which aired from September 5, 2009. Another new song, entitled "Over and Over" will also be in the CD. It is currently used in a commercial for NTT's "Live On FLET'S". Crystal Kay did not star in this advert. "Over and Over" was produced by Taku Takahashi of M-Flo. The fourth track "Helpless Night" is a collaboration between Crystal Kay and Jin Akanishi of KAT-TUN and is performed almost entirely in English. The collection debuted at number 2 on the Oricon Daily Chart, and sold almost 30,000 copies that day alone, and ultimately dropped to number 3 on the Weekly Chart, behind Superfly's Box Emotions and the second week sales of Arashi's All the Best! 1999–2009. It sold 87,669 copies that week. This is Crystal Kay's best peak position on the Oricon Chart since All Yours in 2007, as well as her best first week sales since Call Me Miss... in 2006. Crystal Kay finished off the year by releasing her first remix album The Best Remixes of CK on December 16, 2006.

In 2010, Crystal Kay starred in her first role in a drama series. She played the character of Kokusho Akira, a genius hacker who has carried out many crimes all over the world in the Nippon Television drama Hidarime Tantei Eye, which stars Hey! Say! JUMP member Ryosuke Yamada. The drama began airing on January 23, 2010. On February 24, Crystal Kay released a brand new song, "Flash" on Recochoku Chaku-Uta. "Flash" was featured in the commercial for Canon IXY Digital cameras, which began airing on February 19. Crystal Kay also released a new song called "Victoria". It was being used as the commercial song for Tully's Coffee. Both of these new songs were featured in Crystal Kay's second mini album Flash, which was released on June 16. The mini album also included a tribute to Michael Jackson, and a song written by herself. She also released Crystal Kay Live In NHK Hall: 10th Anniversary Tour CK10 on the same day. It will be her first concert DVD. On June 22, it was announced that Crystal Kay would sing both the opening and ending theme songs, "Time of Love" and "Cannonball" respectively, to the NHK drama Jūnen Saki mo Kimi ni Koishite, starring Aya Ueto. The drama began airing on August 31. Crystal Kay released her next single "Journey (Kimi to Futari de)" on November 24, followed by her ninth studio album on December 8.

=== 2011–2021: Transfer to Universal ===
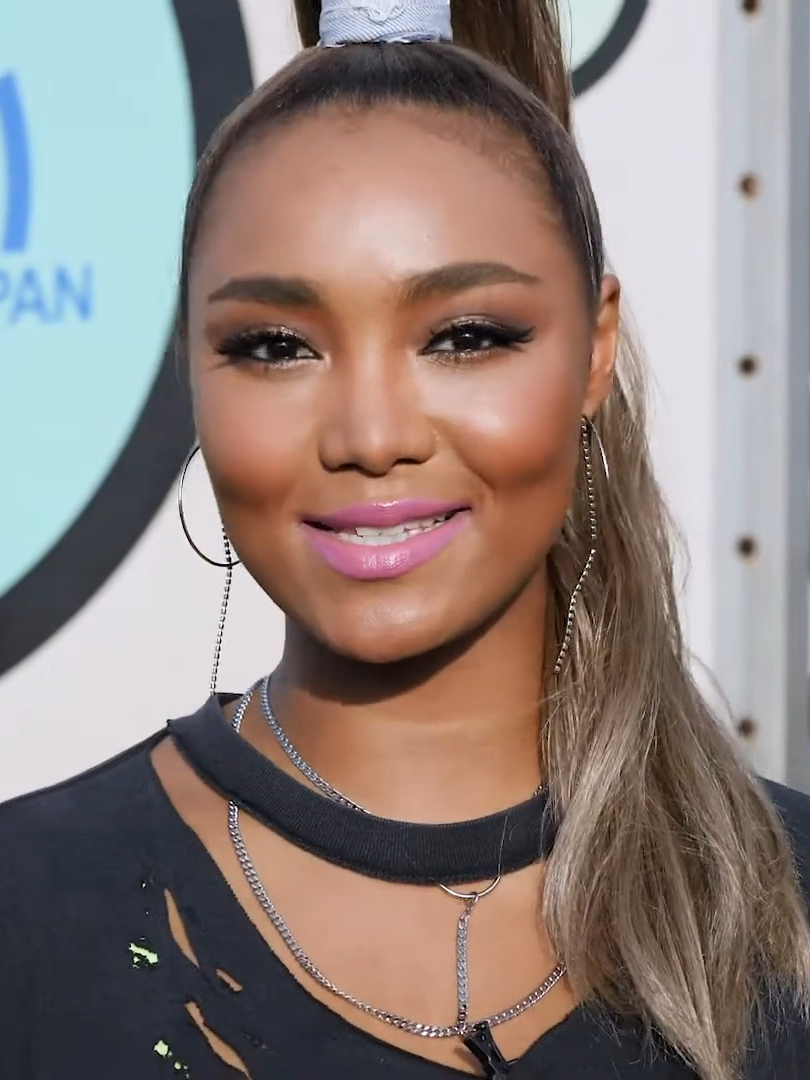
Kay at the 41st Annual Friendship Day Festival, 2017

Crystal Kay's Spin the Music tour was planned to have nine shows across Japan starting February 5 and ending March 29, 2011. Her tour was cancelled after she went to the hospital complaining of sickness and was diagnosed with Acute Nephritis. Crystal Kay was advised not to go on with the tour in order to rest and recover from her illness. Her record label offered refunds through the tour's website. Crystal Kay later performed at the August 2011 MTV Zushi Fes music festival. On April 29, Crystal Kay held a Q&A on her blog and answered her fans' questions, with one question regarding a possible Korean debut. Considering her mother is of Korean ancestry, she has stated: "I can speak just a teeny bit of Korean (lol). My reading and writing are perfect, but learning vocabulary is sooo hard! It's no good that I don't do listening or speaking. I'll think about a Korean debut! I'd like to be able to sing in Korean." On October 5, Universal Music Group subsidiary label Delicious Deli Records posted an announcement that after twelve years Crystal Kay had left Sony Music Japan and signed to them.

In 2012, Crystal Kay recorded a cover of "Eyes on Me" for the Final Fantasy Orchestra Album, becoming the latest in a series of notable artists to cover the song, including Angela Aki, MayBee and Kanon.

In 2013, the singer participated in Dance Earth Party's debut single "Inochi no Rhythm". In March of the same year, she moved to New York, United States, in order to start her international career.

On February 14, 2014, she officially released her US debut music video via MTV Iggy, "Busy Doing Nothing". On July 1, she celebrated her 15th debut anniversary. In November of the same year, the singer announced that she moved her management to LDH.

In January 2015, the singer returned to Japan after a final acoustic concert in New York. Looking back at the time she lived in the United States, she described the experience as a turning point in her life: "It was the first time I lived alone in New York and the first time I lived abroad. I went there because I wanted to try my hand at music, and although it didn't lead to my debut in the end, I think I learned a lot there and was able to plant some seeds. Anyway, it was a journey to face myself and become stronger. Going to New York was the first time I was able to face my identity crisis, which I had been dealing with since I was a child. I think it was a good thing that I was able to think, 'I should have more confidence in my identity'. The other thing is that people in their late twenties have unique problems. Especially for women, it's the age when they have to worry about work, marriage, and childbirth." In terms of music, she succeeded in refining her skills despite not being able to make her international debut: "My goal was to get a record deal there, but I thought it would be better to actually live there, join the local community, and get to know the producers, so I decided to take the plunge. But it was difficult because I didn't have any connections. I went into the studio every day and wrote over 60 songs, but I was an unknown singer over there. For two years, I went back and forth to Japan, meeting with producers, doing sessions, voice training, dancing, and so on." Besides working on her musical career, she also went to acting classes and took an "overcoming anthropophobia course" in New York. On June 3, she released her first single under LDH's management and 30th single overall, "Kimi ga Ita Kara", being also her first single after three years since the release of "Forever". On September 16, she released her 31st single "Revolution", with its title track featuring Namie Amuro. On December 16, Crystal Kay released her 11th studio album Shine.

The Japanese version of Seasons used her song "Eversolving" for the theme song.

From February 12 to March 23, 2016, she held her 9th live tour Crystal Kay Live Tour 2016 "Shine". On March 23, Crystal Kay released her 32nd single "Sakura". On September 14, she released her 33rd single "Lovin' You".

On February 13, 25 and March 13, 2017, she held her first Billboard Live concerts in Tokyo and Osaka.

On June 13, 2018, she released her 12th studio album For You. In 2019, she starred as "Leading Player" in the Japanese version of the Broadway musical Pippin, and subsequently won the Best Actress award at the 27th Yomiuri Theater Awards in 2020.

In spring 2020, played the role of "Motormouth Maybelle" in the Japanese version of the musical Hairspray. On March 17, Kay released her first cover album in fall 2020. "March 9", a beloved graduation song in Japan, was pre-released on March 18 as the first track of the album. On April 24, the musical Hairspray was cancelled due to COVID-19 pandemic in Japan.

On April 21, 2021, she released her first cover album I Sing, which celebrates the 20th anniversary since her debut. Previously, three songs of the album, "Sangatsu Kokonoka", "Utautai no Ballad" and "I Love...", had been released as digital singles over the course of 2020. In the same month as the release of the cover album, she was appointed as the brand ambassador to celebrate the 75th anniversary of JBL. Later that year, she participated in the first season of The Masked Singer Japan under the stage name "Miss Television" and finished the show as the runner-up. On November 5, she released her 12th digital single "Hitori ja nai Kara", which was used as the theme song for the movie Dancing Mary. On November 18, she released her 5th English digital single "Say My Name" in collaboration with the producer Testsu.

=== 2022–present: Rising international profile, more theater roles, and 25th anniversary ===
On March 29, 2022, Kay performed the national anthem and halftime show for the NBA match "Washington Wizards vs Chicago Bulls" together with the professional dance team Rize Dancers at Capital One Arena, the home of the Washington Wizards, for an event called "JAPAN NIGHT". RIZE, a Japanese NBA tour planning and dance team production company, was approached by the Washington Wizards about "JAPAN NIGHT" and offered the event to Crystal Kay. Kay, who herself played on the basketball team in junior high and high school and actively performs at basketball events, including singing the national anthem at NBA games in Japan, decided to participate in this special event because of her passion for the NBA. On July 6, she released the collaboration single "Gimme Some" together with Japanese Hip-Hop artist Daichi Yamamoto. From August to September, she reprised her role as "Leading Player" in the Japanese version of the Broadway musical Pippin. On November 11, she released the collaboration single "No Pressure" together with singer-songwriter and producer VivaOla. On December 7, she released her 15th digital single "Love Me".

In February 2023, Kay released her first English EP, Start Again EP, a collection of three original jazz tracks and one cover. All four songs were featured in the Amazon Prime Video original Japanese drama series A2Z. That same month, the action role-playing video game Wild Hearts was released, which featured Kay in her first video game voice acting role. She previously appeared in the U.S. and European versions of Bust a Groove in 1998, as the uncredited singer of the song "Shorty and the EZ Mouse" prior to her debut.

In June 2023, Ghanaian-American singer Amaarae released her album Fountain Baby to widespread critical acclaim. Crystal Kay is one of the writers of third single, "Wasted Eyes," which also features her spoken Japanese vocals. In August 2023, Crystal Kay announced two shows in Los Angeles, one acoustic and one with a full band, both of which sold out. In September 2023, Crystal performed with collaborators Jimmy Jam and Terry Lewis at the Pittsburgh International Jazz Festival.

2024 marked the 25th anniversary of Crystal Kay's debut in 1999. On January 29, 2024, Kay released her 16th digital single "That Girl" produced by Taku Takahashi (M-Flo). In April 2024, Kay performed for the first time in Korean, a duet with South Korean singer Sung Si-kyung for his YouTube channel. They previously collaborated on his 2018 Japanese album, You Are Here. From August to September 2024, she played the role of Maureen Johnson in the joint Japan-U.S. production of the Broadway musical Rent. There were 30 shows in Tokyo and Osaka, which were performed entirely in English with Japanese subtitles.

In October and November 2024, Kay embarked on the Crystal Kay Billboard 2024 tour. A special 25th anniversary concert in Crystal's hometown of Yokohama was held in December 2024. That month, Crystal was also the musical guest at Anime Weekend Atlanta. In February 2025, Crystal appeared on South Korea's Hanil Top Ten Show, performing Koi ni Ochitara and Lee Sun-hee's "Fate," her first televised performance in Korean.

Kay's fourth greatest hits album, All Time Best 25th Anniversary, was released on June 25, 2025. Following its release, she announced CK25 The Tour, her first North American tour.

== Influence ==
Crystal Kay is considered a pioneer for interracial acts in Japan and across the world. She debuted in 1999 when R&B began to take off in Japan thanks to local acts MISIA, Double and Hikaru Utada. Her success paved the way for many mixed-race artists such as Thelma Aoyama, R&B singer AISHA, Emi Maria, Miss Universe Japan Aisha Harumi Tochigi, Saarah of J-pop group BananaLemon, and enka singer Jero. Crystal Kay has also been cited as inspiration to artists outside of Japan like Joyce Wrice and UMI.

== Personal life ==
In 2009, Crystal Kay said, "There is still some racial thing going on, [but] people are getting used to it. You can see a lot more mixed people on TV, and even (among) models in magazines." At a summer festival that year, the half-Japanese half-Papua New Guinean singer Emi Maria left Crystal Kay a demo and a note saying, "You're my idol, I'm sad I couldn't meet you in person." Nevertheless, Crystal Kay has said, "I consider myself a Japanese artist because I was born and raised here, but nationality-wise I look, and am, foreign."

In her life, Crystal Kay had been struggling with her identity and didn't want to stand out: "I was born and raised in Japan, but I don't have any Japanese blood in my veins (my father is American and my mother is Korean), so I had always had a complex.", "There was only one senior I knew who was Korean and Black [...]. They (the others) were all Black and Japanese, or White and Japanese, or half-Japanese. [...] I thought of myself as a minority among the majority." However, living in New York between 2013 and 2015 helped her accept her multi-ethnical identity: "I had this complex that made me shrink back. But when I talked about it in New York, people would say, 'What are you talking about? You're carrying three cultures on your shoulders, and you're building a good career in Japan, isn't that great? You should be more proud of yourself.' I thought, 'That's right'." As for her future, she dreams of becoming a "bridge between countries": "It could be through music, a musical, or a movie. I'm also very interested in acting, so I want to be a bridge through entertainment in any genre."

== Discography ==
- C.L.L Crystal Lover Light (2000)
- 637: Always and Forever (2001)
- Almost Seventeen (2002)
- 4 Real (2003)
- Crystal Style (2005)
- Call Me Miss... (2006)
- All Yours (2007)
- Color Change! (2008)
- Spin the Music (2010)
- Vivid (2012)
- Shine (2015)
- For You (2018)
- I Sing (2021)

== Filmography ==
Dramas
Year	Title	Role	Notes
2010	Hidarime Tantei EYE	Kokusho Akira	Supporting role
2016	Non-Mama Hakusho	Guest at the bar	Cameo, sang theme song, "Lovin' You"
2024	YUMING STORIES	Maeda	Supporting role, Episode 2
Movies
Year	Title	Role	Notes
2008	Pokémon: Giratina and the Sky Warrior	Lucky (voice) (Nurse Joy's Chansey)	Sang ending theme song, "One"
2009	Yamagata Scream	Casey	
2009	Jungle Emperor Leo a.k.a. Kimba the White Lion	Researcher (voice)	
2011	Happy Feet Two	Gloria (voice)	Japanese dubbed version.
2013	Hikayat Hang Kway Teow	Tan Tee Jah	Malay short-film
2015	Seoul Searching	Jamie	
2019	The Earthquake Bird	Nightclub singer	
2023	Between the White Key and the Black Key	Lisa	
Video games
Year	Title	Role	Notes
1998	Bust a Groove	Vocalist	(Uncredited) U.S. and European versions only
2023	Wild Hearts	Suzuran (voice)	English version
Stage
Year	Title	Role	Notes
2013	DANCE EARTH 〜Seimei no Kodō〜	herself	Support guest
2019–2022	Pippin	Leading Player	Supporting role
2024	Rent	Maureen Johnson	Lead role, English performance
