= Tully's Coffee =

American specialty coffee brand

- Product type: Coffee
- Current owner: Keurig Dr Pepper
- Country: U.S.
- Introduced: 1992; 34 years ago

Tully's Coffee is an American specialty coffee manufacturing brand owned by Keurig Dr Pepper, which acquired Tully's brand and wholesale business in 2009.

Tully's branded coffee continues to be sold by Keurig in its K-Cup format and as bagged ground coffee.

At the time of the Keurig wholesale acquisition, the "Tully's" name and retail-store rights were retained by the now-defunct original retailer and wholesaler chain of coffee shops based in Seattle, Washington, which had been originated by Tom "Tully" O'Keefe in 1992. Its stores served specialty coffees, espresso, baked goods, pastries, and coffee-related supplies. The U.S. chain permanently closed in September 2018.

The coffee-shop chain also has overseas licensing agreements in Japan, which since 2006 have been owned by Ito En, Inc. The brand name is used for over 760 Tully's coffee houses in Japan (as of April 2022).

Tully's coffee shops were well known for once following an expansion strategy of opening stores adjacent to those of the considerably larger coffee chain Starbucks, also based in Seattle.

== History ==
=== Inception ===
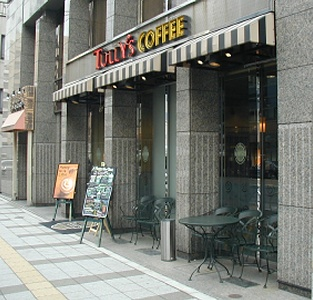
Typical Tully's Coffee store

Tully's opened its first store in Kent, Washington in September 1992.

The founder of Tully's Coffee, Tom "Tully" O'Keefe, who retired from the company in 2010, planned to rival the quickly expanding Starbucks coffee. Tully's quickly developed into a strong regional specialty coffee retailer concentrated in Puget Sound, where coffee loyalty is so deep there is one coffee shop for every 4,000 people. In 2006, Tully's made its first net profit. Tully's focus was no longer on competing against Starbucks but on serving hand-crafted coffee in its local Seattle area retail coffee shops. The company had franchisees and grocery chain coffee shops in the U.S. and Asia.

It operated stores in the Greater Puget Sound area of Washington, California, Idaho, Arizona, Colorado, and licensed its brand for use in South Korea and Japan. It had also opened stores in Singapore, Metro Manila, Beijing and Stockholm, Sweden.

Tully's opened its first Japanese outlet in Ginza, Tokyo, in 1997. Tully's opened in Japan after a 33-year-old Sanwa Bank employee, Kota Matsuda, personally appealed to O'Keefe to open a chain of high-quality coffee shops in Japan. Matsuda became the CEO of Tully's Coffee Japan, a joint venture between Tully's, Matsuda and several outside investors. Unlike its rival Starbucks, which chose to run its stores in Japan directly, Tully's expanded in Japan through franchising. Tully's sold a portfolio of intellectual property to TCJ in August 2005 for over $13 million, and the Japanese tea maker Ito En acquired TCJ in 2006.

In August 2007, plans for an IPO were placed on hold by the company, citing a "volatile market." This decision was made right after the company was advised by its bankers to refrain from going forward with the IPO due to a tremendously declining stock market. The company pursued alternative sources of capital and sought all strategic investment or sale opportunities as a result. Fiscal 2006 losses amounted to $9.7 million.

=== Sale of wholesale coffee-bean distribution business, brand, and roasting operation ===
Tully sold its North American wholesale coffee-bean distribution business, brand (which it licensed back for $1/year in perpetuity), and roasting operation to Green Mountain Coffee Roasters in 2009, earning $40.3 million in the deal, allowing the company to pay off 100% of its debt, including trade debt, make a cash distribution to shareholders, and maintain substantial cash reserves for the expansion of its retail business. Tully's retained all retail rights for North America, and all wholesale and retail rights for the balance of the world, excluding Japan.

In 2010, Tully's Coffee International and DK Retail Co., Ltd. entered into a Master Licensing Agreement to develop up to 100 retail stores in South Korea.

Founder and Chairman Tom T. O'Keefe retired in 2010.

=== US coffeeshop closures ===
The Tully's Coffee board and management filed for chapter 11 bankruptcy in October 2012, citing low cash reserves and the need to renegotiate leases with landlords. At the time of the filing, Tully's had recently closed or was about to close 17 unprofitable company-owned stores. Global Baristas, an investment group led by actor Patrick Dempsey had the highest bid of US$9.15 million to buy Tully's at a bankruptcy auction on January 3, 2013. U.S. Bankruptcy Court Judge Karen Overstreet subsequently approved the sale to Global Baristas, rejecting objections from Starbucks and other prospective buyers. The deal became final on June 30, with all employees keeping their jobs and getting a bonus of two vacation days as a "thank you" for their commitment to the company. Dempsey later backed out of the partnership and filed a lawsuit against his former partner and attorney Michael Avenatti.

In September 2017, Tully's Coffee announced it would close 12 locations in the Puget Sound region that were located inside Boeing facilities, including the Everett and Renton assembly factories. They had originally opened in 2006 as part of an agreement between the two companies.

On March 8, 2018, Tully's announced that it was closing its remaining stores temporarily due to a lack of coffee. Later that month, many Tully's locations remained closed with eviction notices posted by landlords indicating the lack of payment.

In April 2018, Tully's coffee was sued by Daytona International Speedway.

Tully's US coffeehouse business was officially closed when Keurig and Global Baristas entered a permanent injunction in September 2018. Global Baristas agreed to never operate a coffee chain, or any other food or beverage business, under the name again, and Keurig will continue to sell Tully's branded coffee.

An involuntary Chapter 7 bankruptcy liquidation petition was filed against Global Baristas in October 2018.

Tully's still operates overseas through franchise agreements, with 760 stores in Japan as of April 2022.
