= Delicious Deli Records =

Defunct Japanese record label

- Parent company: Universal Music Japan
- Founded: April 20, 2009
- Founder: Kimitaka Kato
- Defunct: 2016
- Status: Defunct; carried into Virgin Music
- Distributor: Universal Music Japan
- Genre: Pop; rock; electronica
- Country of origin: Japan
- Official website: universal-music.co.jp/delideli/

Delicious Deli Records (Japanese: デリシャス・デリ・レコーズ, Hepburn: Derishiyasu Deri Rekozu) was a Japanese record label owned by Universal Music Japan. It originally founded in 2009 under Universal Japan's western division, Universal International. Its headquarters were located in Akasaka, Tokyo, Japan. In August 2014, the label became an imprint of Virgin Music. In 2016, Universal Japan announced Delicious Deli would merge with Virgin Music.

== Artists ==
=== Japan ===
- Abcho
- Crystal Kay
- D'espairsRay
- Honeymoon (ハネムーン, Hanemun)
- KAM
- Kim Hyun-joong
- MACO
- Mari Sekine
- Mumtaz Wonder
- Nanase
- Rola
- Sotenbo (想天坊)
- Vamps (2008-2017)

=== International ===
- Far East Movement
