= Honeyz discography =

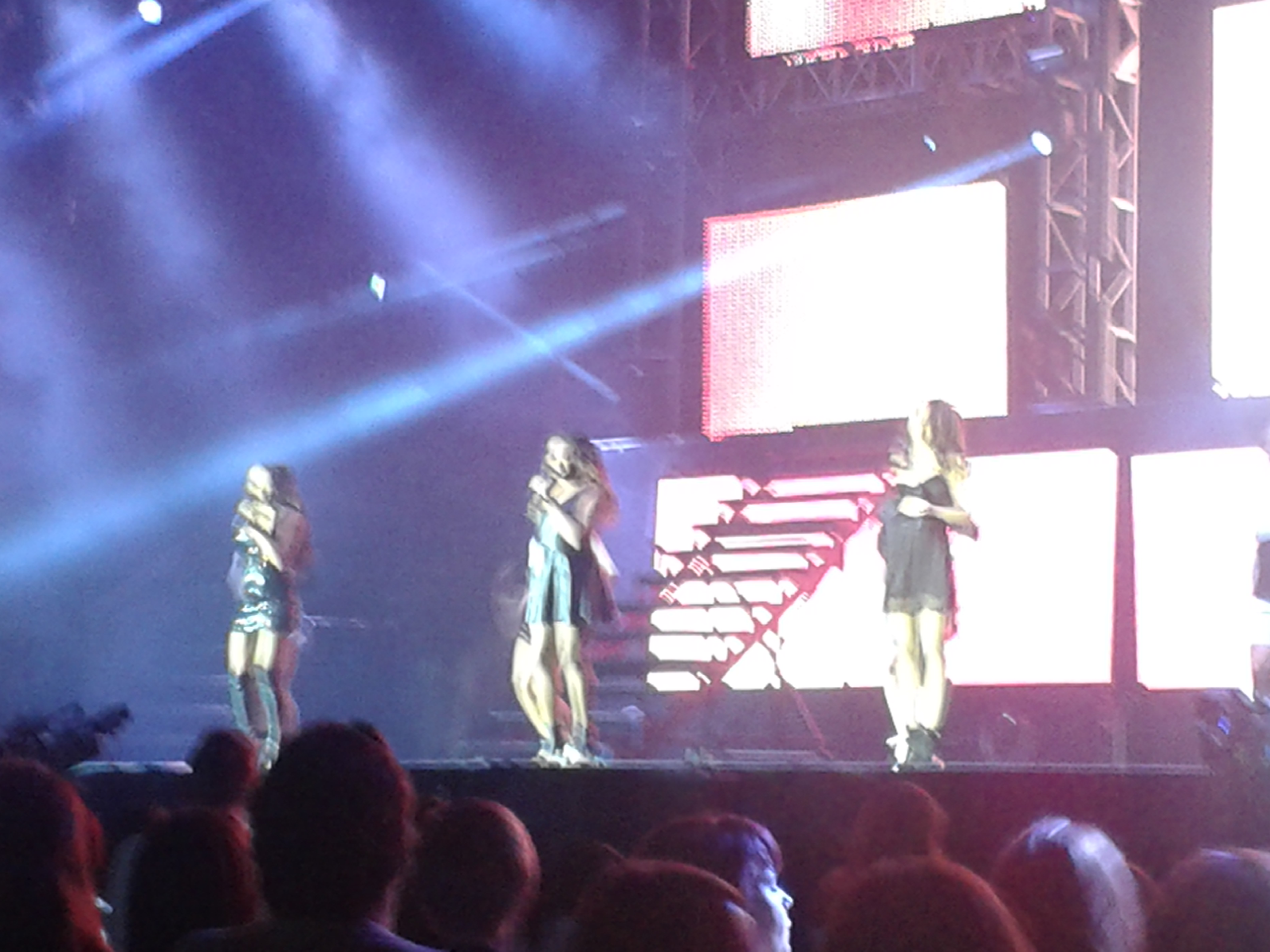
- Honeyz in 2013
- Studio albums: 1
- Compilation albums: 1
- Singles: 7
- Music videos: 7

British girl group Honeyz released one studio album, seven singles and one compilation album. The group, formed in 1998 consisting of Célena Cherry, Heavenli Abdi, Naima Belkhiati, and later Mariama Goodman, had five UK top 10 hits between 1998 and 2000, with "Finally Found" (1998), "End of the Line" (1998), "Love of a Lifetime" (1999), "Never Let You Down" (2000) and "Won't Take It Lying Down" (2000).

== Albums ==
=== Studio albums ===
List of albums, with selected chart positions and certifications
Title	Album details	Peak chart positions			Certifications
Title	Album details	UK	AUS	SCO	Certifications
Wonder No.8	Released: 23 November 1998; Label: Mercury; Format: CD, cassette	33	94	61	BPI: Gold

=== Compilation albums ===
List of albums
Title	Album details
The Collection	Released: 23 October 2006; Label: Spectrum Music; Format: CD, digital download

== Singles ==
=== As lead artist ===
List of singles, with selected chart positions and certifications
Title	Year	Peak chart positions								Certifications	Album
Title	Year	UK	UK R&B	AUS	IRL	NL	NZ	SCO	SWE	Certifications	Album
"Finally Found"	1998	4	1	3	4	21	12	8	6	BPI: Gold; ARIA: Platinum	Wonder No.8
"End of the Line"	1998	5	1	24	7	—	—	8	35	BPI: Silver	Wonder No.8
"Love of a Lifetime"	1999	9	4	64	26	—	—	13	—		Wonder No.8
"Never Let You Down"	1999	7	2	—	—	—	—	19	—		Wonder No.8
"Won't Take It Lying Down"	2000	7	2	—	30	—	—	10	—		Wonder No.8
"Not Even Gonna Trip"	2000	24	5	—	46	—	—	35	—		Nutty Professor II: The Klumps
"I Don't Know"	2001	28	11	—	—	—	—	33	—		Non-album single
"—" denotes releases that did not chart or were not released in that territory.

=== As featured artist ===
List of singles, with selected chart positions
Title	Year	Peak chart positions		Album
Title	Year	UK	IRE	Album
"I Wish It Could Be Christmas Everyday" (among The Big Reunion cast)	2013	21	82	Non-album single

=== Promotional singles ===
Title	Year	Album
"In the Street"	1998	Wonder No.8
"Definitely Something"	2015	Non-album single
