= CK5 =

Compilation album by Crystal Kay
- Released: June 30, 2004
- Recorded: 1999–2004
- Genres: Pop, R&B
- Length: 1:03:11
- Languages: Japanese, English
- Label: Epic

Crystal Kay chronology
4 Real (2003)	CK5 (2004)	Crystal Style (2005)

Singles from CK5
- 1. "Motherland" Released: May 12, 2004

CK5 is a compilation album by Japanese contemporary R&B singer Crystal Kay, released on June 30, 2004. It commemorates the five years since her debut as a musician in 1999. On the same day, CK 99—04 Music Clips, a video album compiling her music videos was released.

== Background ==
In 2001, Crystal Kay started to collaborate with the hip-hop/R&B group M-Flo, with Verbal featured on her single "Ex-boyfriend", and Taku Takahashi producing her singles "Hard to Say" (2002) and "Boyfriend (Part II)" (2003). In 2003, Crystal Kay collaborated on with them on two singles, "Reeewind!" and "I Like It". November saw the release of an Asia-wide English language album Crystal Kay (released as Natural in Japan) and her fourth studio album 4 Real.

In May 2004, Crystal Kay released "Motherland", a ballad written for the anime Fullmetal Alchemist, which became her second top ten single. In June, she announced on her official website that she had graduated high school.

== Contents ==
In April 2004, Crystal Kay's official site ran a poll to find out what the most popular songs of Crystal Kay's were for her fans. The resulting top 10 songs became the basis for the track list of CK5. Three songs that were not on the list made it onto the album: "Motherland", which was the preceding single for the album, "Over the Rainbow", which was used in commercials for Tokyo Mode that featured Crystal Kay personally, and "Lead Me to the End", which had been used as a theme song for a Fuji Television new years drama, Guchi 2.

The album compiles songs from her previously released studio albums, as well the single "Motherland". Half of the album is taken from her fourth studio 4 Real (2003) which had been released seven months ago, as well as two songs from Almost Seventeen (2002) ("Think of U" and "Hard to Say"), three from 637: Always and Forever (2001) ("Ex-Boyfriend", "Tsuki no Nai Yoru, Michi no Nai Basho" and "Lost Child") and one from C.L.L Crystal Lover Light (2000), her debut single "Eternal Memories" (1999).

== Promotion and release ==
The album was announced in early May, 2004. To promote the release, Crystal Kay made appearances on radio stations throughout July, and was featured in magazines such as Nylon Japan, What's In?, CanCam, Blenda, Woofin and Teen Girl. On May 29, Crystal Kay made an appearance on the red carpet for the MTV Video Music Awards Japan 2004. On July 6, Crystal Kay performed an in-store acoustic live set at HMV Shibuya for 150 applicants who had purchased both the album and the DVD.

The album's June 30, 2004 release is one day before the five year anniversary of "Eternal Memories", which was originally released on July 1, 1999.

== Track listing ==
No.	Title	Lyrics	Music	Arranger(s)	Length
1.	"Motherland"	H.U.B.	Yanagiman	Ken Matsubara	4:31
2.	"Eternal Memories"	Hiroshi Ichikura, Crystal Kay	Yoko Kanno	Kanno	5:08
3.	"Ex-Boyfriend" (featuring Verbal)	Verbal	T. Kura, Michico	T. Kura	5:12
4.	"Tsuki no Nai Yoru, Michi no Nai Basho" (月のない夜 道のない場所, "A Moonless Night, a Pathless Place")	Saeko Nishio	U-suke Asada	Asada	4:24
5.	"Lost Child" (Hiroshi Fujiwara+Shinichi Osawa featuring Crystal Kay)	Nishio	Osawa, Fujiwara	Osawa	6:40
6.	"Think of U"	Crystal Kay, Nishio	Michico, T.Kura	T.Kura	4:54
7.	"Hard to Say"	Taku Takahashi, H.U.B., Sphere of Influence, Crystal Kay	Takahashi	Takahashi	4:50
8.	"I Like It" (Crystal Kay loves M-Flo)	M-Flo, Crystal Kay	M-Flo, Crystal Kay	M-Flo	5:45
9.	"Over the Rainbow" (Judy Garland cover)	E.Y. Harburg	Harold Arlen	Shin Kono	3:54
10.	"Lead Me to the End"	Masumi Kawamura	Solaya	Solaya	4:00
11.	"Can't Be Stopped"	Nishio	Marcus Dernulf	Octopussy	4:29
12.	"Kataomoi" (片想い, "One Way Love")	Nishio, 51-Goichi-, Arkitec, Coyass	Takahashi	Takahashi	4:24
13.	"Boyfriend (Part II)"	Nishio	Reed Vertelney	Takahashi	5:00
Total length:					1:03:11

DVD
No.	Title	Length
1.	"Eternal Memories~Curious (live)"

== Charts ==
Chart (2003)	Peak position
Japan Oricon weekly albums	2

=== Sales and certifications ===
Chart	Amount
Oricon physical sales	282,000
RIAJ physical shipping certification	Platinum (250,000+)

== Release history ==
Region	Date	Format	Distributing Label	Catalogue codes
Japan	June 30, 2004	CD, CD/DVD, digital download	Epic	ESCL-2686, ESCL-2578~9
South Korea	August 17, 2004	CD, Digital download	Sony Music	2294281
Japan	July 17, 2005	CD	Epic	ESCL-2686
