= The Big Reunion (concerts) =

2013 concert tour

- Tour by Five, 911, Atomic Kitten, B*Witched, Honeyz, Liberty X and Blue
- Promotional image for the tour
- Start date: 26 February 2013
- End date: 15 December 2013
- Legs: 2
- No. of shows: 24 in the UK; 1 in Ireland; 25 total

The Big Reunion is a 2013 series of concerts featuring British pop groups Five, 911, Atomic Kitten, Honeyz, Liberty X and Blue, and Irish group B*Witched. The groups, who were big names in the UK pop music scene in the late 1990s and early 2000s, reunited for the ITV2 reality-documentary series The Big Reunion (apart from Blue, who had already been reunited since 2011), a show which follows them meeting again for the first time in a decade and rehearsing ahead of their comeback performance.

Although the bands were initially only to perform a single concert at London's Hammersmith Apollo on 26 February 2013, high demand for tickets and the popularity of the series led to a full arena tour being announced. The arena tour consisted of 14 shows that took place during May 2013, although Blue only performed at four of these shows due to their own tour commitments. A leg called "Christmas Party Tour" was later announced with seven gigs in December 2013.

== Background ==
On 18 October 2012, it was announced that pop groups Five, 911, Atomic Kitten, B*Witched, Honeyz and Liberty X—who were big names in the UK pop music scene in the mid-to-late 1990s and early 2000s—would be reuniting for an ITV2 documentary series and a comeback performance at some point in 2013.

On 21 February 2013, it was revealed that a seventh band, Blue, would be joining The Big Reunion gig as well. When asked why they chose to join The Big Reunion, Blue said: "Phil Mount, the Big Reunion's producer, has always been a long time supporter of the band, giving us our first TV break, he really wanted us to be surprise special guests announced halfway through the series and to perform on the Hammersmith Apollo show. This sounded like a lot of fun, giving us the perfect chance to perform together again in the UK for our fans and reconnect with the other acts, many of whom friends of ours and started out around the same time as us. For us the 'Big Reunion' is a great chance for all of us bands to come together for one BIG party on Tuesday night!"

The bands were originally only supposed to perform a one-off concert at London's Hammersmith Apollo on 26 February 2013, but when the entire show sold out in under five minutes shortly after the premiere of the first episode on 31 January 2013, rumours circulated that the show may become a full arena tour around the UK. On 11 February, it was confirmed that, following high ticket demands and the popularity of The Big Reunion, a full 12-date UK tour would be taking place from 3–14 May 2013. On 14 February shows were added in Dublin and Belfast, bringing the tour to a total of 14 shows. Blue will only be taking part in four of the 14 shows due to headlining their own arena tour.

On 27 March 2013, it was announced that the bands would perform a mini Christmas tour in December 2013. Five, Atomic Kitten, B*Witched, 911, Honeyz and Liberty X will all be taking part, but Blue will not as they will be headlining their own comeback tour. Three additional shows were announced on 23 April 2013.

== Broadcast and recordings ==
The original Hammersmith Apollo show in February was recorded and parts of the concert, as well as backstage footage, aired on ITV2 on 28 March 2013 as The Big Reunion finale. The full concert was also released on DVD on 1 April 2013.

== Setlist ==
26 February
1. Medley: "We Will Rock You"/"Everybody Get Up" – Five
2. "C'est la Vie" – B*Witched
3. "Bodyshakin'" – 911
4. "Just a Little" – Liberty X
5. "All Rise" – Blue
6. "Finally Found" – Honeyz
7. "Right Now" – Atomic Kitten
8. "Keep On Movin'" – Five
9. "Rollercoaster" – B*Witched
10. Medley: "Thinking It Over"/"Got to Have Your Love" – Liberty X
11. "The Tide Is High (Get the Feeling)" – Atomic Kitten
12. "A Little Bit More" – 911
13. Medley: "Love of a Lifetime"/"End of the Line" – Honeyz
14. "Sorry Seems to Be the Hardest Word" – Blue
15. "Blame It on the Weatherman" – B*Witched
16. "More Than a Woman" – 911
17. "Won't Take It Lying Down" – Honeyz
18. "Being Nobody" – Liberty X
19. "One Love" – Blue
20. "If Ya Gettin' Down" – Five
21. "Whole Again" – Atomic Kitten

== Tour dates ==
Date	City	Country	Venue
Original single show
26 February 2013	London	England	Hammersmith Apollo
Leg 1
3 May 2013	Sheffield	England	Motorpoint Arena Sheffield
4 May 2013	Manchester	England	Manchester Arena
5 May 2013	Newcastle	England	Metro Radio Arena
6 May 2013	Aberdeen	Scotland	Aberdeen Exhibition and Conference Centre
7 May 2013	Glasgow	Scotland	Scottish Exhibition and Conference Centre
8 May 2013	Liverpool	England	Echo Arena Liverpool
9 May 2013	Nottingham	England	Capital FM Arena
10 May 2013	Bournemouth	England	Bournemouth International Centre
11 May 2013	Cardiff	Wales	Motorpoint Arena Cardiff
12 May 2013	Birmingham	England	LG Arena
13 May 2013	Brighton	England	Brighton Centre
14 May 2013	London	England	The O_{2} Arena
16 May 2013	Dublin	Ireland	The O_{2}
17 May 2013	Belfast	Northern Ireland	Odyssey Arena
28 June 2013^{[A]}	Newmarket	England	Newmarket Racecourse
18 August 2013	York	England	Castle Howard
Leg 2 – Christmas Party Tour
7 December 2013^{[B]}	Minehead	England	Butlins Minehead
11 December 2013	Nottingham	England	Capital FM Arena
12 December 2013	Birmingham	England	LG Arena
13 December 2013	Sheffield	England	Motorpoint Arena Sheffield
14 December 2013^{[C]}	London	England	The O_{2} Arena
15 December 2013^{[D]}	Manchester	England	Manchester Arena

Notes
^{A} Five, Blue, and Liberty X only. Part of Newmarket Nights' "Big Pop Party"
^{B} Blue will not be performing. Part of Butlin's "Back Together" music weekend.
^{C} Matinee and evening concerts

== Reception ==
Almost 4,000 people attended the sold-out show at the Hammersmith Apollo on 26 February, for which tickets sold out almost immediately after going on sale. The entire 14-date arena tour quickly sold out as well.

The arena tour has received highly positive reviews from critics. Denise Evans gave the show in Manchester on 4 May, four out of five stars. "It was like watching a Smash Hits Poll Winners Party of old or an episode of Top of the Pops, which ultimately is exactly what the majority people singing and dancing along in the arena wanted. A bit of nostalgia.", she said. After attending the show in Nottingham on 10 May, Jayne Garfitt of thisisnottingham.com said "When it comes to revisiting the bands of your childhood the experience tends to tread a thin line between legendary and tragic. But that was not the case with the Big Reunion Tour. From the minute 5ive stepped on stage to the opening bars of Queen's "We Will Rock You", the atmosphere at the Capital FM Arena was electric. They might all be older and wiser but there is no doubt that these bands still have what it takes – slick dance moves, catchy lyrics and a great big sense of fun. Brilliant."
