= Crystal Kay (album) =

- Japanese release cover

Compilation album by Crystal Kay
- Released: November 7, 2003
- Recorded: 1999–2003
- Genres: J-pop, R&B
- Length: 43:08; 53:01 (Japan edition)
- Label: Epic

Crystal Kay chronology
Almost Seventeen (2002)	Crystal Kay (2003)	4 Real (2003)

Crystal Kay is a compilation album by Japanese R&B singer Crystal Kay. It compiles Crystal Kay's English language songs, and was released across Asia in November 2003. It was re-released in Japan on December 17, 2003, under the name Natural: World Premiere Album.

== Contents ==
The album features six cover songs and six original compositions of Crystal Kay's. All of the songs on the album had been previously released, except for three: "Can't Be Stopped ('Til the Sun Comes Up)", "I'm Not Alone" and the English version of "Boyfriend (Part II)", "Boyfriend (What Makes Me Fall in Love)". The already released songs are mostly composed of B-sides from Crystal Kay's singles between 1999 and 2003, including "Fly Away" from her debut single, "Eternal Memories". The song "Couldn't Care Less" was originally from 637: Always and Forever (2001), and "Love of a Lifetime" originated on Almost Seventeen (2003).

Two songs are exclusive to the Japanese edition of the album, "Liberty", a Masayuki Suzuki cover, and "No More Blue Christmas'", a Natalie Cole cover. "Liberty" was later compiled on Suzuki Mania: Suzuki Masayuki Tribute Album released in February 2004, and "No More Blue Christmas'" on Crystal Kay's 2007 extended play Shining and her 2011 compilation album Love Song Best.

== Release and promotion ==
In November 2003, the album was released in Asian territories including South Korea, Taiwan, Hong Kong and Thailand. After Crystal Kay's fourth Japanese studio album, 4 Real, was released on November 27, 2003, a Japanese edition of Crystal Kay entitled Natural was released in Japan on December 17, 2003, featuring two bonus tracks. To promote the release, Crystal Kay appeared at the 2003 Mnet Asian Music Awards in Seoul, South Korea on November 27, 2003, performing the English version of "Can't Be Stopped ('Til the Sun Comes Up)". This was her first live performance outside Japan.

== Critical reception ==
Miwako Koyama of Shinko Music felt that the experience of listening to this album was different to listening to a regular Western release, despite all of the songs being sung in English. Because of how many songs were covers of songs from the 1980s, she felt as if she was being "immersed in the feeling of happiness" of a person playing their favorite songs for someone else. Tomoe Sato writing for Tower Records' in-store magazine Bounce praised the English language versions of "Can't Be Stopped" and "Boyfriend (Part II)", feeling that the English language version emphasized the songs' quality and Crystal Kay's singing voice. She felt that all of the album's cover songs had "refreshing" and "lovely" arrangements, and that the album should be listened together with her studio album 4 Real as a set.

== Track listing ==
No.	Title	Lyrics	Music	Arranger(s)	Length
1.	"Can't Be Stopped (Til the Sun Comes Up)"	Marcus Per Börje Dernulf, Andreas Bengt Christian Levander, Jonas Hand Nordelius	Dernulf, Levander, Nordelius	Octopussy	4:28
2.	"Boyfriend (What Makes Me Fall in Love)" (Gladys Knight cover)	Sylvia Bennett-Smith, Reed Vertelney	Bennett-Smith, Vertelney	Bennett-Smith, Vertelney	4:57
3.	"Time After Time" (Cyndi Lauper cover)	Cyndi Lauper, Rob Hyman	Lauper, Hyman	Hiroshi Okamoto	4:04
4.	"Make Me Whole" (Amel Larrieux cover)	Amel Larrieux, Guesly Larrieux	A. Larrieux, G. Larrieux	Okamoto	5:40
5.	"Good Morning Sue"	Shanti Snyder	Yoko Kanno	Kanno	2:02
6.	"Love of a Lifetime" (Honeyz cover)	Bennett-Smith, Laney Stewart	Bennett-Smith, Stewart	Naoichiro Yamamoto	3:57
7.	"I'm Not Alone"	Keri Hilson	Hilson	T.Kura	5:18
8.	"Couldn't Care Less"	Fredrik "Franciz" Anders Jernberg, Pontus "Lepont" Wennerberg	Jernberg, Wennerberg	Jernberg	3:49
9.	"Over the Rainbow" (Judy Garland cover)	Yip Harburg	Harold Arlen		3:56
10.	"Fly Away"	Snyder	Yasushi Ishii	Ishii	4:59
Total length:					43:08

Japanese bonus tracks
No.	Title	Lyrics	Music	Length
11.	"Liberty" (Masayuki Suzuki cover)	Minnie Shady, Aki	Minako Yoshida	5:22
12.	"No More Blue Christmas'" (Natalie Cole cover)	Gerry Goffin	Michael Masser	4:31
Total length:				53:01

== Charts and sales ==
Chart (2003)	Peak position
Japan Oricon weekly singles	34

=== Sales ===
Chart	Amount
Oricon physical sales	30,000

== Release history ==
Region	Date	Format	Distributing Label	Catalogue codes
South Korea	November 7, 2003	CD	Epic	2281144
South Korea	November 8, 2003	Digital download	Epic	2281144
Japan	December 17, 2003	CD, digital download	Epic	ESCL-2480
Japan	November 2, 2006	Rental CD	Epic	ESCL-2480
