= ALA.NI =

British singer

Alani Gibbon, known professionally as ALA.NI, is a musician from London, England.

== Career ==
The Spanish magazine Dust and Soul described her as "almost a renaissance-type woman: she started as a dancer, studied fashion, did some poetry and is now mostly dedicated to music." In the late 1990s, she was part of the British R&B trio Kleshay, which had two top 40 hits in 1998 and 1999, but was dropped by the label after these two singles. Gibbon and her cousin, Honeyz lead singer Célena Cherry then recorded as Anotherside and released a dance track titled "This Is Your Night" released in 2003 on V2 Records. Although "trained in musical theatre and opera", she does not follow any disciplined vocal exercise like warm-ups. As a singer, she also worked with Glen Scott, Nitin Sawhney, Benjamin Clementine, and Damon Albarn, as well as Westlife and Andrea Bocelli.

The first album of her own as ALA.NI, You & I, was released in 2017 on No Format!. All songs on the album were written a cappella on her iPad. The always slow-tempered ballads of the self-produced album were recorded in London; several instruments like steel drums and a Hohner Guitaret she played herself. In style, the whole album follows in the vain of her great uncle Leslie Hutchinson, who lived in Harlem and was mentored by Cole Porter, before he became a cabaret star in the 1930s, working in London and Paris. "It feels like I'm living a bit of his spirit," she said in an interview.

Her second album came out in 2020 titled Acca, pointing to the pure vocal nature of the recording, her voice accompanied by a beat boxer and male vocals, among others Iggy Pop and LaKeith Stanfield, with only sparse additional instrumentation. Her third album Sunshine Music was released in 2025 again on No Format, a year before Adrian Younge featured her in front of a jazz orchestra (Linear Labs: São Paulo).

== Personal life ==
ALA.NI's parents are both originally from Grenada. As a child, she attended the Corona Theatre School in Hammersmith, followed by Sylvia Young Theatre School. In 1989, she appeared as one of the Pink Windmill Kids on EMU-TV.

== Weblinks ==
- YouTube channel by ALA.NI
- NPR Tiny Desk Concert by ALA.NI with Marvin Dolly on guitar uploaded on Aug 21, 2017 on YouTube
