= Mariama Goodman =

British singer

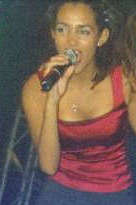
- Born: Mariama Christiana Goodman; 25 December 1977 (age 48); London, England
- Occupations: Singer; songwriter; dancer
- Years active: 1995–present
- Spouse: Andrew-Lee Potts (m. 2014; div. 2020)
- Children: 2
- Musical career
- Genres: R&B; pop; teen pop; soul
- Instrument: Vocals
- Labels: Jive; Mercury; 1st Avenue
- Formerly of: Honeyz; Solid HarmoniE

Mariama Christiana Goodman (born 25 December 1977) is an English singer, songwriter, and dancer. She is best known for being a former member of the girl group Honeyz, from which she departed in October 2024, as well as a former member of the girl group Solid HarmoniE, which she departed from in early 1999 to join Honeyz.

== Biography ==
=== Solid HarmoniE ===
Goodman started her pop career in 1996 signed to Jive Records in the US with Solid HarmoniE. The group had the same management as, and toured regularly with NSYNC and the Backstreet Boys. The group disbanded in 2000, but reunited (without Goodman) in 2013.

=== Honeyz ===
When Solid HarmoniE split, Goodman returned to her home country and was invited to join the Honeyz along with Célena Cherry and Naima Belkhiati. Former member Heavenli Abdi had left the Honeyz after two singles. The album Wonder No. 8 went gold and spawned five top ten singles: "Won't Take It Lying Down", "Never Let You Down", "Love of a Lifetime", "End of the Line" and "Finally Found". At the Maxim Awards in 2000, they won the prize for "Best British Girl Band" and were also nominated in that year's BRIT and MOBO Awards. Heavenli Abdi returned to the Honeyz when Goodman left and they released two more singles which charted at number 24 and 28. The band then split.

Despite Celena Cherry insisting in 2009 that there was "zero" chance of Honeyz getting back together, it was confirmed in October 2012 that Honeyz would be reuniting for The Big Reunion documentary on ITV2 in January 2013. Although Belkhiati was in the original lineup, she decided not to take part in the reformation, so Goodman took her place. The series began airing on 31 January 2013 and followed the group rehearsing for two weeks ahead of one major comeback performance at the London Hammersmith Apollo on 26 February 2013. The bands also went on an arena tour.

=== Non-musical career ===
Goodman moved to the US for two years, and when she returned to her home country she began her training in midwifery. She graduated with a First Class Honours degree and is working as a midwife.

== Personal life ==
She has a daughter, born in 2011.

Mariama married actor Andrew-Lee Potts on 20 August 2014. The couple had a son in 2016. Goodman and Potts have since divorced.
