= Never Let Me Down (disambiguation) =

Never Let Me Down is a 1987 album by David Bowie.

Never Let Me Down may also refer to:

- "Never Let Me Down" (David Bowie song), 1987
- "Never Let Me Down" (Kanye West song), 2004
- "Never Let Me Down" (VIZE & Tom Gregory song), 2020
- "Never Let Me Down", B-side to Sophie Ellis-Bextor's song "Murder on the Dancefloor", 2001
- "Never Let Me Down", a 2012 song by Lukas Graham from Lukas Graham

== See also ==
- "Never Let Me Down Again", 1987 single by Depeche Mode
- "Never Let You Down", 1999 song by the Honeyz
