= I Wanna Love You =

I Wanna Love You may refer to:

- "I Wanna Love You" (Akon song), 2006
- "I Wanna Love You" (Jade song), 1992
- "I Wanna Love You", a song by Estelle from The 18th Day
- "I Wanna Love You", a song by Solid HarmoniE from Solid HarmoniE
