= Got 2 Have Ya =

Single by Solid HarmoniE
- Released: 19 September 1996
- Recorded: 1996
- Genre: Dance-pop
- Length: 3:50
- Label: Ultrapop
- Songwriter(s): Alex Trime; Sven Jordan; Heavenli Abdi; Gary Carolla
- Producer(s): Trime'n DELgado

Solid HarmoniE singles chronology
"Got 2 Have Ya" (1996)	"I'll Be There for You" (1997)

"Got 2 Have Ya" is the debut single by British pop girl group Solid HarmoniE. The song was released in 1996 by Ultrapop as an eventual non-album track. It was written by Alex Trime, Sven Jordan, Heavenli Abdi and Gary Carolla. It was produced by Trime'n DELgado.

== Commercial performance ==
"Got 2 Have Ya" was merely released in Germany under the Edel sublabel Ultrapop. It did not chart in the German monthly singles charts in 1996. Despite this it was included on two compilation albums in Germany, namely Bravo Hits 15 and Hot Hits, both released late 1996.

== Music video ==
The music video accompanying the track was shot partially in black and white and partially in colour. The colour segments of the music video feature the members performing between mannequins and disco lights. The black and white segments show the girls judging men, which they all reject after careful consideration, in the auspicious of three men in suits. At the end of the video a waiter in the back drops a glass bottle, catching the attention of the girls. The girls decide to pick him after which Mariama kisses one of the suited men goodbye.

== Formats and track listings ==
Maxi single
No.	Title	Writer(s)	Length
1.	"Got 2 Have Ya (Radio Version)"	Alex Trime, Sven Jordan, Haevenli Abdi, Gary Carolla	3:53
2.	"Got 2 Have Ya (Short Club Mix)"	Alex Trime, Sven Jordan, Haevenli Abdi, Gary Carolla	3:44
3.	"Got 2 Have Ya (Club Mix)"	Alex Trime, Sven Jordan, Haevenli Abdi, Gary Carolla	6:11
Total length:			13:48

12-inch single
No.	Title	Writer(s)	Length
1.	"Got 2 Have Ya (S/M Swingbeat Radio Edit)"	Alex Trime, Sven Jordan, Haevenli Abdi, Gary Carolla	3:50
2.	"Got 2 Have Ya (S/M Swingbeat Club Mix)"	Alex Trime, Sven Jordan, Haevenli Abdi, Gary Carolla	6:12
3.	"Got 2 Have Ya (S/M Swingloop Radio Edit)"	Alex Trime, Sven Jordan, Haevenli Abdi, Gary Carolla	3:50
4.	"Got 2 Have Ya (S/M Swingloop Radio Mix)"	Alex Trime, Sven Jordan, Haevenli Abdi, Gary Carolla	5:47
Total length:			19:39

== Release history ==
Country	Release date	Format(s)	Label
Germany	1996	Maxi single, 12-inch single	Ultrapop
