= 4 Real =

Studio album by Crystal Kay
- Released: November 27, 2003
- Recorded: 2002–03
- Genres: J-pop; R&B
- Length: 51:52
- Label: Epic

Crystal Kay chronology
Crystal Kay (2003)	4 Real (2003)	CK5 (2004)

Singles from 4 Real
- 1. "Boyfriend: Part II" Released: January 22, 2003; 2. "I Like It (Crystal Kay loves M-Flo)" Released: June 18, 2003; 3. "Candy" Released: October 22, 2003; 4. "Can't Be Stopped" Released: November 27, 2003

4 Real is the fourth studio album by Japanese recording artist Crystal Kay. It was released via Epic Records Japan on November 27, 2003, and was made available as a stand-alone CD and for digital consumption. The title 4 Real is a play on the phrase "for real"—signifying the singer's fourth record. It contains primarily contemporary R&B influences and saw contributions from various songwriters and producers, including M-Flo, Yoshika and Keri Hilson, among others. The album spawned four singles, which were all released over the course of 2003.

Commercially, 4 Real peaked at number six on the Oricon Albums Chart and became her second top-ten album in Japan, following the top-three release Almost Seventeen (2002). The album continued to chart for a total of 25 weeks in the country. Within a month of the album's release, it was certified gold by the Recording Industry Association of Japan (RIAJ) for physical shipments of over 250,000 units. It went on to sell over 246,000 copies in 2004, and was ranked the 59th best-selling album of the year in Japan.

== Track listing ==
Track listing for 4 Real
No.	Title	Lyrics	Music	Length
1.	"Boyfriend: Part II"	Saeko Nishio	Sylvia Bennett-Smith, Reed Vertelney	4:59
2.	"I Like It (Crystal Kay loves M-Flo)"	M-Flo, Crystal Kay	M-Flo, Crystal Kay	5:44
3.	"Nice and Slow"	Saeko Nishio	Reed Vertelney	3:34
4.	"I'm Not Alone"	T. Kura, Keri Hilson, Emi K. Lynn	T. Kura, Keri Hilson, Emi K. Lynn	5:20
5.	"What Time Is It"	T. Kura, Michico	T. Kura, Michico	4:06
6.	"Candy"	Yoshika	Octopussy	4:20
7.	"Can't Be Stopped"	Saeko Nishio	Andreas Levander, Marcus Dermulf, Jonas Nordelius	4:29
8.	"Lead Me to the End"	Masumi Kawamura	Solaya	3:58
9.	"Kataomoi (片想い; Unrequited Love)"	Saeko Nishio, 51 -GOICHI-, Arkitec, Coyass	Taku Takahashi	4:23
10.	"Over the Rainbow"	Yip Harburg	Harold Arlen	3:58
11.	"Do U Like It (by Fantastic Plastic Machine) Extended Mix"	M-Flo, Crystal Kay	M-Flo, Crystal Kay	7:01

== Charts ==
=== Album ===
Chart (2003–04)	Peak position
Japanese Weekly Albums (Oricon)	6
Japanese Yearly Albums (Oricon)	59

=== Singles ===
Release date	Title	Peak position	Sales / certifications	Ref.
January 22, 2003	"Boyfriend (Part II)"	3	33,000 (Gold)	
June 18, 2003	"I Like It"	8	58,000	
October 22, 2003	"Candy"	2	15,000	
November 27, 2003	"Can't Be Stopped"	146	1,000	

== Sales and certifications ==
Sales and certifications for 4 Real
Region	Certification	Certified units/sales
Japan (RIAJ)	Platinum	250,000^{^}
^{^} Shipments figures based on certification alone.

== Release history ==
Release history for 4 Real
Country	Date	Label	Format	Catalogue #
Japan	November 27, 2003	Epic	Compact disc	ESCL-2470
