= Kleshay =

British R&B band (1997-2000)

- Origin: London, England
- Genres: R&B
- Years active: 1997–2000
- Label: Jerv Records
- Past members: Alani Gibbon; Candace Cherry; Leah Charles-King

Kleshay were an all-female British R&B trio from the 1990s, who had two top 40 hits. Their first track "Reasons" was produced by K-Gee, reaching number 33 on the UK Singles Chart in 1998; this got them onto Trevor Nelson's lick pick of the week. Their second single, "Rush", was even more successful and peaked at number 19, and thus they appeared on many different TV shows to promote the track including MTV's Select and SMTV Live.

Dropped by their record label, the group then went their separate ways. Alani Gibbon formed a short-lived duo with her cousin, the ex-Honeyz member Célena Cherry called Anotherside, and went on to make a solo career as ALA.NI. Cherry provided backing vocals for a while for some established artists, and Leah Charles-King became a television presenter.

== Discography ==
=== Singles ===
- "Reasons" (September 1998) - UK #33
- "Rush" (February 1999) - UK #19
