= I'll Be There for You (Solid HarmoniE song) =

Single by Solid HarmoniE

from the album Solid HarmoniE
- Released: 1997
- Genre: Dance-pop
- Length: 3:09
- Label: Jive
- Songwriters: Max Martin; Kristian Lundin
- Producers: Kristian Lundin; Max Martin

Solid HarmoniE singles chronology
"Got 2 Have Ya" (1996)	"I'll Be There for You" (1997)	"I Want You to Want Me" (1998)

Music video
- "I'll Be There For You" on YouTube

"I'll Be There for You" is a song by British-American girl group Solid HarmoniE, released in 1997 by Jive Records as the lead single from the group's only album, Solid HarmoniE (1997). Produced by Swedish producers and songwriters Kristian Lundin and Max Martin, who also wrote it, it remains the group's most successful song, peaking within the top 10 in the Netherlands and Sweden. Additionally, it was a top-20 hit in Denmark and the United Kingdom. In the United States, "I'll Be There for You" reached number 23 on the Billboard Bubbling Under Hot 100 chart. Two music videos were also produced, both directed by Gerry Wenner.

== Critical reception ==
Pan-European magazine Music & Media wrote, "There's a real international aspect to this US pop/dance quartet, A&R'ed out of the Netherlands, with Swedish producers; a female counterpart of the Backstreet Boys, perhaps? They have in common some really strong vocal harmonies and—if this example is anything to go by—some very convincing material. Frans van Dun, one of the programmers at leading Dutch AC network Sky Radio 100.7 FM/Hilversum, believes the comparison is an apt one. "They have a lot in common with the Backstreet Boys, who are very popular over here," he suggests. Van Dun continues: "It's the kind of pleasant, inoffensive track that's easy to programme and although it didn't test that well, we've stuck with it since it started to chart 11 weeks ago." Van Dun concludes: "For one reason or another, people do seem to like this thing, because it spent seven weeks in the singles Top 10."

Music Week gave the song three out of five, adding, "Three Brits make up this funky Orlando-based female pop foursome managed by Donna Wright. Not All Saints, but not bad either." A reviewer from Sunday Mirror said that "they'll never change the world with bubblegum pop tunes" like "I'll Be There For You", "but they might just make you smilte."

== Track listings ==
- 12-inch single, UK (1997)
1. "I'll Be There for You" (Matthias Remix) – 6:45
2. "I'll Be There for You" (Poptastic Full on Mix) – 3:36
3. "I'll Be There for You" (Red 5 Remix) – 6:02
4. "I'll Be There for You" (Original Version) – 3:09
- CD single, Europe (1997)
1. "I'll Be There for You" (Single Edit) – 3:09
2. "I'll Be There for You" (Matthias Remix) – 6:45
- CD maxi, Europe (1997)
1. "I'll Be There for You" (Single Edit) – 3:09
2. "I'll Be There for You" (Matthias Remix) – 6:45
3. "I'll Be There for You" (Red 5 Remix) – 6:02
4. "I'll Be There for You" (Matthias Radio Edit) – 3:56

== Charts ==
=== Weekly charts ===
Weekly chart performance for "I'll Be There for You"
Chart (1997–1998)	Peak position
Australia (ARIA)	83
Belgium (Ultratip Bubbling Under Flanders)	12
Denmark (IFPI)	12
Europe (Eurochart Hot 100)	44
France (SNEP)	83
Netherlands (Dutch Top 40)	7
Netherlands (Single Top 100)	9
Scotland (OCC)	20
Sweden (Sverigetopplistan)	9
UK Singles (OCC)	18
US Bubbling Under Hot 100 (Billboard)	23

=== Year-end charts ===
Year-end chart performance for "I'll Be There for You"
Chart (1997)	Position
Sweden (Topplistan)	77

Chart (1998)	Position
Netherlands (Dutch Top 40)	48
Netherlands (Single Top 100)	32
Sweden (Hitlistan)	88
