= Melissa Graham =

English singer-songwriter (born 1975)

- Also known as: Queenie, Diva, Wiggy, Maggie
- Born: Melissa Ashley Graham; 25 October 1975 (age 51); Coventry, West Midlands, England
- Genres: Pop, dance
- Occupations: Singer, dancer, TV presenter, paramedic
- Instruments: Vocals, piano, guitar
- Years active: 1995–present
- Labels: Edel Records. Jive Records 1997–1999 (girl band); Zomba Records 2000–2003 (solo)

Melissa Ashley Graham (born 25 October 1975) is an English singer and songwriter, best known as a member and lead singer of the 1990s British girl group, Solid HarmoniE.

== History ==
=== 1995–1999: Solid HarmoniE ===
Graham joined Solid HarmoniE as an original member in 1995 and signed their first record deal in New York with Jive/Zomba records. They had success in the following few years. The band enjoyed considerable success and popularity in Germany, Netherlands, Philippines, Japan, and Malaysia, where they had toured on different occasions during 1997 until 1998. They released one album and five singles until the group split up in 1999. During this time they sold over two million records and toured with the Backstreet Boys, NSYNC, and Peter Andre amongst others.

In 2014, she reunited with band members Beki Onslow and Elisa Cariera for a reunion tour and they released a new single called "Circus", which was written by Melissa Graham and Tim Laws.

=== 2000–2003: Solo ===
Graham started a solo career in 1999 and started a new album in the Netherlands where her former band had been cordially received by the fans. Her first single "Bulletproof" was released on 6 November 2000 in Germany and it was recorded to reach 89 of German top 100. Shortly after two more singles "Welcome to my World" and "Hello World" (Belle Perez cover) were released which were reasonable successful in the Netherlands. She was still to finish her solo album as of 2003, but her album was never released due to some unresolved issues with her recording company. She was also the face of Italian clothing company Freesoul. She also appeared in a 6-page feature in FHM, making the 'Girls of Summer' Special edition 2001.

Graham and Solid HarmoniE have appeared on The National Lottery, Top of the Pops and she featured on BBC2's Never Mind the Buzzcocks with Kriss Akabusi, Katy B, Johnny Borrell, Alex Brooker and was hosted by Jack Whitehall.

=== Songwriting and composition ===
Graham then went on to write a number one single for the girl band Raffish with "Plaything". She also co-wrote the title track to The Afroz album, called "Ain't It Funny".

In 2015, she co-wrote and sang on Warriors of the Dystotheque's first album The Future Is Ours. The track was called "Atom Vibe". This album was played on BBC Radio 2 and BBC Radio 6 Music, as well as on Across the Line, Electric Mainline, RTÉ 2XM and BBC CWR.

In 2017, she was commissioned to write and produce the title track and incidental music for sitcom LaLas Ladiesz, which stars Kulvinder Ghir.

=== Academic life ===
She studied Paramedic Science at the University of Coventry and was awarded a First Class Honours Degree in Emergency Practice from Derby University. She still holds a paramedic licence. In 2020, Graham became a Non-Medical Prescriber and continues to study Advanced Clinical Practice at masters level.

=== Acting ===
Graham has attended the BSA (Birmingham School of Acting) and started her acting career in a few short films. She took a small but pertinent role in the short sci fi film I.R.I.S. with film director Hazraf 'HaZ' Dullul

In 2016, she starred in Mera Mahi NRI alongside actors Kulvinder Ghir (Goodness Gracious Me) and Hardy Sandu. This was released early in 2017.

She also took a featured role in the upcoming sci fi thriller The Beyond, which is the brain child of Hazraf 'HaZ' Dulull. She was credited as assistant production manager and casting director for this movie.

In 2024, She played Dr Shah in the BBC's Waterloo Road.

In 2026, she played the attending physician in the remake of Konami's 'Return to Silent Hill', which was directed by Christophe Gans. https://www.imdb.com/title/tt22868010/?ref_=nm_flmg_job_1_accord_1_cdt_t_1

=== DJing ===
Graham started DJing in 2016 and produced her first EP as one half of the EAT VEGANS collective. She favours deep and progressive house but plays a few different genres and played at Sol House Ibiza in 2016, the monastery, AA live and Miss Moneypennys. She released her first EP with Repeat After Me records under the pseudonym 'CattoniC'.

=== As writer ===
Graham has contributed to Dr Marianne Trent's Book The Grief Collective and was acknowledged for helping Dr FFione Davies produce the footage in Emergency Care of Minor Trauma in Children: A Practical Handbook.

In 2020, she started writing her first screenplay.
