= Wonder No.8 =

- 1998 cover featuring Heavenli Abdi

Studio album by Honeyz
- Released: 23 November 1998
- Genre: R&B
- Labels: Mercury; Polygram
- Producers: Steve Levine; Steve Robson; Simon Climie; Ignorants

Alternative cover
- 1999 cover featuring Mariama Goodman

Alternative cover
- Japanese version

Singles from Wonder No.8
- 1. "Finally Found" Released: 24 August 1998; 2. "End of the Line" Released: 7 December 1998; 3. "Love of a Lifetime" Released: 12 April 1999; 4. "Never Let You Down" Released: 11 October 1999; 5. "Won't Take It Lying Down" Released: 28 February 2000

Wonder No.8 is the only album by British R&B girl group Honeyz. It was first released on 23 November 1998 and then re-released on 1 November 1999 with new artwork, a slightly altered track listing and two new tracks.

Three singles were released from the original version with founding member Heavenli Abdi ("Finally Found", "End of the Line" and "Love of a Lifetime") and two more from the re-released version with new member Mariama Goodman ("Never Let You Down" and "Won't Take It Lying Down"). All five singles reached the top ten of the UK Singles Chart, whilst the album was certified gold.

== Track listing ==
=== Standard version ===
No.	Title	Writer(s)	Length
1.	"Honeyz Intro"	Honeyz; Steve Levine	0:24
2.	"Finally Found"	Honeyz; Yoyo Olugbo; Henry Binns	4:47
3.	"Do Me Baby"	Honeyz; Olugbo; Binns	3:59
4.	"Keep Me Hanging On"	Olugbo; Binns	3:55
5.	"Love of a Lifetime" (Rude Boy Mix)	Sylvia Bennet-Smith; Laney Stewart	3:48
6.	"Just Let Go"	Bennet-Smith; Eric Jackson	6:02
7.	"In the Street" (Ignorants Mix)	Honeyz; Ignorants	5:26
8.	"Seems Like"	Olugbo; Binns	3:54
9.	"Good Love"	Rhett Lawrence; Travon Potts; Sharlotte Gibson	3:34
10.	"Somebody to Love Me"	Babyface	4:46
11.	"Summertime"	Honeyz; Levine; Paul Meehan; JP Esq	3:50
12.	"Wonder No. 8"	Dean McTaggart; David Tyson	4:44
13.	"What Does She Look Like?"	Honeyz; Olugbo; Binns; Natalie John	4:37
14.	"End of the Line" (Rude Boy Mix)	Paul Begaud	4:56
15.	"Finally Found" (Reprise)	Olugbo; Binns	0:59

Japanese bonus tracks
No.	Title	Writer(s)	Length
16.	"Love of a Lifetime" (DJ Watarai Remix)	Bennet-Smith; Stewart	3:39
17.	"Finally Found" (U-Nam Remix)	Honeyz; Olugbo; Binns	4:35

=== Re-released version ===
No.	Title	Writer(s)	Length
1.	"Finally Found"	Honeyz; Olugbo; Binns	4:49
2.	"Never Let You Down"	Sara Eker; Dawn Joseph; Lucy Abbott; Steve Robson; Peter Kearney	3:33
3.	"Won't Take It Lying Down"	Simon Climie; Arnthor Birgisson; Anders Bagge	4:13
4.	"Do Me Baby"	Honeyz; Olugbo; Binns	3:47
5.	"Keep Me Hanging On"	Olugbo; Binns	3:32
6.	"Love of a Lifetime" (Rude Boy Mix)	Bennet-Smith; Stewart	3:51
7.	"Just Let Go"	Bennet-Smith; Jackson	4:52
8.	"In the Street" (Ignorants Mix)	Honeyz; Ignorants	5:27
9.	"Seems Like"	Olugbo; Binns	3:57
10.	"Good Love"	Lawrence; Potts; Gibson	3:23
11.	"Somebody to Love Me"	Babyface	4:28
12.	"Summertime"	Honeyz; Levine; Meehan; JP Esq	3:51
13.	"Wonder No. 8"	McTaggart; Tyson	4:45
14.	"What Does She Look Like?"	Honeyz; Olugbo; Binns; John	4:38
15.	"End of the Line" (Rude Boy Mix)	Begaud	5:00

Note

- The re-released version includes videos for "Finally Found", "End of the Line", and "Never Let You Down." It also removes the hidden interlude at the start of "Just Let Go."

== Personnel ==
Standard version

Adapted from the liner notes for the standard version of Wonder No.8 and corresponding track numbers.

Musicians

- Honeyz (Célena Cherry, Heavenli Abdi, Naima Belkhiati) – vocals
- Jerry Brown – drums (tracks 5, 14)
- Terl Bryant – percussion (tracks 2, 6, 10, 12–14), drum overdubs (tracks 4, 9)
- Matt Cheadle – guitar (tracks 6, 8, 14)
- Danny G – keyboards (tracks 5, 14)
- Francis Hilton – bass guitar (track 2)
- Ignorants – rap (track 7)
- JP Esq – rap (track 11)
- Paul Lancaster – bass guitar (tracks 3, 4, 8, 9)
- Dean McIntosh – arrangement (track 2)
- Rob May – keyboards (tracks 3, 4, 9)
- Paul Meehan – keyboards (track 2)
- Trevor Nelson – spoken introduction (track 6)
- Chris Offen – acoustic guitar (track 2), guitar (tracks 3, 4, 13)
- Reyvon – additional vocals (track 7)
- Freddie Thompson – bass guitar (track 5)
- Zak – guitar (track 7)

Technical

- Andy Bradfield – mix engineer (tracks 5, 14)
- Steve "Barney" Chase – mix engineer (tracks 2–4, 6, 8–13)
- Marcellus Fernandes – mix engineer (track 7)
- John Holliday – additional remixing (tracks 5, 14)
- Ignorants – producer (track 7), mixing (track 7)
- Steve Levine – producer (tracks 2–6, 8–14), programming (tracks 2–6, 8–13)
- Rob May – programming (track 8)
- Paul Meehan – programming (tracks 3–6, 9–13)
- Rude Boy – mixing (tracks 2–6, 8–14)
- Trevor Steel – additional remixing (tracks 5, 14)
- Darius Zickus – programming (tracks 2, 6)
- Packaging design by Bruce 2 at Green Ink
- Photography by Uli Weber

Re-released version additional tracks & artwork

Adapted from the liner notes for the re-released version of Wonder No.8.

- "Never Let You Down": produced by Steve Robson; additional production & mix by Denis Ingoldsby; mix engineering by Andy Bradfield
- "Won't Take It Lying Down": produced by Simon Climie; engineered by Adam Brown; mixed by Alar Suurna
- Packaging design by Bruce 2 at Green Ink
- Photography by Steve Shaw

== Charts ==
Chart performance for Wonder No. 8
Chart (1999)	Peak position
Australian Albums (ARIA)	94
Scottish Albums (Official Charts)	61
UK Albums (Official Charts)	33
UK R&B Albums (Official Charts)	8

== Certifications ==
Certifications for Wonder No. 8
Region	Certification	Certified units/sales
United Kingdom (BPI)	Gold	100,000^{^}
^{^} Shipments figures based on certification alone.
