= Not Even Gonna Trip =

2000 single by Honeyz

Single by Honeyz

from the album Nutty Professor II: The Klumps
- Released: 9 October 2000
- Genre: R&B
- Label: Mercury; 1st Avenue
- Songwriter: Gregory Charley
- Producer: Gregory Charley

Honeyz singles chronology
"Won't Take It Lying Down" (2000)	"Not Even Gonna Trip" (2000)	"I Don't Know" (2001)

Alternative cover
- UK CD2 cover

"Not Even Gonna Trip" is a song by British girl group Honeyz from the soundtrack Nutty Professor II: The Klumps. It was released in 2000 as their sixth single, and was the first with returning member Heavenli Abdi since "Love of a Lifetime".

== Track listing ==
UK Part I

1. "Not Even Gonna Trip" (radio edit)
2. "Finally Found" (Rude Boy Mix)
3. "Good Love" (radio edit)
- Enhanced CD includes "Not Even Gonna Trip" video

UK Part II

1. "Not Even Gonna Trip" (radio edit)
2. "Not Even Gonna Trip" (Ed Case Remix)
3. "Seems Like"
- Includes a limited edition poster

UK promo

1. "Not Even Gonna Trip" (radio edit)

== Charts ==
Chart (2000)	Peak position
Scotland (OCC)	35
UK Singles (OCC)	24
UK Airplay (Music Week)	35
UK Hip Hop/R&B (OCC)	5
