= I Want You to Want Me (Solid Harmonie song) =

1998 single by Solid HarmoniE

Single by Solid HarmoniE

from the album Solid HarmoniE
- Released: 9 March 1998
- Genre: Pop
- Length: 3:28
- Label: Jive
- Songwriters: Jacob Schutze; Max Martin
- Producers: Kristian Lundin; Max Martin

Solid HarmoniE singles chronology
"I'll Be There for You" (1997)	"I Want You to Want Me" (1998)	"I Wanna Love You" (1998)

Music video
- "I Want You to Want Me" on YouTube

"I Want You to Want Me" is a song by British-American girl group Solid HarmoniE, released in March 1998 by Jive Records as the second single from the group's only album, Solid HarmoniE (1997). The song was produced by Swedish producers Kristian Lundin and Max Martin, who also co-wrote it with Jacob Schutze, and peaked within the top 10 in Finland, the Netherlands and Sweden. Additionally, it was a top-20 hit in Denmark, Norway, Scotland and the UK. On the Eurochart Hot 100, it reached number 23 in April 1998. The accompanying music video was directed by Roger Pomphrey.

== Critical reception ==
British Birmingham Evening Mail named "I Want You to Want Me" Single of the week, writing, "More top pop sounds from the four girl group should see them holding their own despite all the competition around these days." Retrospectively, Can't Stop the Pop complimented the hooks of the song as "unmistakeably Max Martin through and through." They added that the "glorious pre-chorus ("We've got to stop this game, tell me do you feel the same?") is arguably the highlight of the song. It's an effortless snapshot of pop music at its most uplifting and sunniest". A reviewer from Music Week stated that the group "should have no problems notching up their second hit with this melodic mid-tempo chugger. Co-written by former heavy metal man Max Martin, who has also penned some of the Backstreet Boys' most memorable tunes, it has sweet and very tight harmonies from the girls, some a little redolent of Abba — and that can't be bad." Sunday Mirror complimented the song as "gnawingly good pop which should have you all on solids by the end of the week."

== Track listing ==
- 12" single, Italy
1. "I Want You to Want Me" (Original Radio Edit) – 3:28
2. "I Want You to Want Me" (Original Extended) – 5:01
3. "I Want You to Want Me" (Barbarus Club Remix) – 6:57
4. "I Want You to Want Me" (Colour System Inc. Remix) – 6:10
5. "I Want You to Want Me" (Kay Cee Remix) – 5:59
- CD single, Europe
1. "I Want You to Want Me" (Original Radio Version) – 3:28
2. "I Want You to Want Me" (Original Extended Version) – 5:01
- CD maxi, Europe
1. "I Want You to Want Me" (Original Radio Version) – 3:28
2. "I Want You to Want Me" (Original Extended Version) – 5:01
3. "I Want You to Want Me" (Barbarus Remix) – 6:57
4. "I Want You to Want Me" (Colour System Inc. Remix) – 6:10
5. "I Want You to Want Me" (Kay Cee Remix) – 5:59
6. "I Want You to Want Me" (Colour System Dub) – 7:09

== Charts ==
=== Weekly charts ===
Weekly chart performance for "I Want You to Want Me"
Chart (1998)	Peak position
Belgium (Ultratop 50 Flanders)	48
Denmark (IFPI)	18
Europe (Eurochart Hot 100)	23
Finland (Suomen virallinen lista)	10
Germany (GfK)	64
Latvia (Latvijas Top 50)	16
Netherlands (Dutch Top 40)	4
Netherlands (Single Top 100)	4
Norway (VG-lista)	14
Scotland Singles (Official Charts)	18
Sweden (Sverigetopplistan)	10
Switzerland (Schweizer Hitparade)	39
UK Singles (Official Charts)	16
UK Independent Singles (OCC)	2

=== Year-end charts ===
Year-end chart performance for "I Want You to Want Me"
Chart (1998)	Position
Europe Border Breakers (Music & Media)	37
Latvia (Latvijas Top 50)	108
Netherlands (Dutch Top 40)	35
Netherlands (Single Top 100)	51
Sweden (Hitlistan)	72
