= Almost Seventeen =

Studio album by Crystal Kay
- Released: October 23, 2002
- Recorded: 2001–2002
- Genres: J-pop, R&B
- Length: 56:21
- Label: Epic
- Producers: VERBAL, T-Kura, MICHICO, Paul Epworth

Crystal Kay chronology
637: Always and Forever (2001)	Almost Seventeen (2002)	Crystal Kay (2003)

Singles from Almost Seventeen
- 1. "Think of U" Released: November 28, 2001; 2. "Hard to Say" Released: August 7, 2002; 3. "Girl U Love" Released: October 23, 2002

Almost Seventeen is the third album by Japanese singer and actress Crystal Kay. It is her second R&B dominant album and is produced by a similar team who worked on 637: Always and Forever. A large part of the record was written and produced by Michico and T-Kura of Giant Swing Productions. She also worked with the TinyVoice production company and Takahashi Taku from m-flo to produce "Hard to Say". "Love of a Lifetime" is a cover of the 1999 single by British girl group Honeyz. Kay also released her ninth single "Girl U Love" alongside the album. The first pressings of Almost Seventeen were released at a lower price, and later prints received a new catalog number and a raised price.

The album reached No. 2 on the weekly Oricon chart. This was a huge career milestone for Kay, with her last album peaking at No. 19. In 2003, Almost Seventeen sold 213,023 copies, making it the sixty-second best-selling album of the year. It is Kay's best-selling album.

== Track listing ==
No.	Title	Length
1.	"Hard to Say"	4:47
2.	"Missin' U, Baby"	4:13
3.	"Girl U Love"	4:23
4.	"Shooting Stardust"	4:32
5.	"Boyfriend (What Makes Me Fall in Love)"	4:12
6.	"Hide'n'Seek"	3:50
7.	"You're My Fate"	5:08
8.	"Love of a Lifetime"	3:57
9.	"Attitude"	3:16
10.	"Move On"	4:11
11.	"A Song for You"	4:39
12.	"Think of U"	4:53
13.	"Feel the Same"	4:20

== Charts ==
Release	Chart	Peak position	First week sales	Sales total	Chart run
October 23, 2002	Oricon Daily Charts				
October 23, 2002	Oricon Weekly Charts	2		354,910	58 weeks
October 23, 2002	Oricon Monthly Charts				
October 23, 2002	Oricon Yearly Charts	#62			

== Release history ==
Country	Date	Label	Format	Catalogue #
Japan	October 23, 2002	Epic	Compact disc	ESCL-2356
