= I Don't Know (Honeyz song) =

2000 single by Honeyz

Single by Honeyz
- B-side: "Why You Wanna Lie on Me?"
- Released: 6 August 2001
- Recorded: 2000
- Genre: Pop
- Length: 3:28
- Label: Mercury; 1st Avenue
- Songwriters: Shaunna Bolton; Alex Cantrall; Charles Giscombe; Joe Priolo
- Producers: Steve Robson; Paul Meehan; The Collective

Honeyz singles chronology
"Not Even Gonna Trip" (2000)	"I Don't Know" (2001)

"I Don't Know" is a song by Honeyz. The single was originally intended to be the lead single from the group's second studio album, Harmony, although the album was later cancelled. The single later featured on the group's 2006 compilation album The Collection. "I Don't Know" peaked at number 28 on the UK Singles Chart and number 11 on the UK R&B Chart in 2001. The song contains vocals from former member Mariama Goodman, though released after her departure from the group.

== Track listing ==
UK Part I

1. "I Don't Know" (radio edit)
2. "I Don't Know" (Almighty Mix)
3. "Why You Wanna Lie on Me?"
4. "I Don't Know" (video)
- Enhanced CD includes "I Don't Know" video

UK Part II

1. "I Don't Know" (radio edit)
2. "In the Street" (2001 Mix)
3. "I Don't Know" (Sound Mindz Mix)
- Included poster

UK Promo

1. "I Don't Know" (radio edit)

UK 12" promo

1. "I Don't Know" (Almighty Mix)
2. "I Don't Know" (Sleazesisters Anthem Mix)
3. "I Don't Know" (Sound Mindz Mix)

UK promo CD

1. "I Don't Know" (Almighty Mix)
2. "I Don't Know" (Sleazesisters Mix)
3. "I Don't Know" (Sound Mindz Mix)

== Credits and personnel ==
Credits adapted from Discogs and YouTube.

- Steve Roberson – production
- The Collective – additional production
- Paul Meehan – production
- James Loughrey – percussion
- Mark Linderman – guitar
- Celena Cherry – vocals
- Naima Belkhiati – vocals
- Mariama Goodman – vocals
- Alex Cantrall – writing
- Joe Priollo – writing
- Chuck Giscomb – writing
- Shaunna Bolton – writing

== Charts ==
Chart (2001)	Peak position
Scotland (OCC)	33
UK Singles (OCC)	28
UK Hip Hop/R&B (OCC)	11
