= Solid HarmoniE =

British girl group

Solid Harmonie
- Also known as: SHE
- Origin: United Kingdom
- Genres: Pop; teen pop
- Years active: 1996–2000, 2014, 2025–present
- Label: Jive
- Members: Rebecca Onslow; Melissa Graham; Elisa Cariera
- Past members: Mariama Goodman; Jenilca Giusti

Solid Harmonie (stylised as Solid HarmoniE, also known as SHE) are a British-American pop girl group that was moderately successful, releasing five singles and one album titled Solid HarmoniE before disbanding in 2000. They had the most success in the Netherlands where their album went to No. 2 and was certified Gold. The single "I Want You to Want Me" peaked at No. 4 in the Dutch singles chart. The group sold over a million records worldwide.

== History ==
=== 1996–1997: Formation ===
Solid Harmonie was formed in 1996 by Lou Pearlman as a female opposite of his earlier created boy bands such as NSYNC and Backstreet Boys. They were signed to Jive Records in the United States. Initially, the band was made up of the trio Rebecca Onslow, Melissa Graham, who was playing in a popular Irish band called Calvary in 1996, and Mariama Goodman. They released their debut single, "Got 2 Have Ya" in 1996, before Goodman left in 1997 to care for her ill mother.

=== 1997–1998: Goodman's first departure and Solid HarmoniE ===
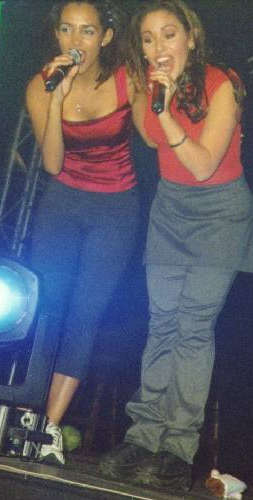
Mariama Goodman (left) and Elisa Cariera in 1998

Goodman was immediately replaced by American Elisa Cariera in 1997. However, Goodman rejoined the band later in the year and the group became a four-piece. The group was successful, releasing the four singles "I'll Be There for You", "I Want You to Want Me", "I Wanna Love You" and "To Love Once Again" preceded by their self-titled debut album release "Solid Harmonie". The album includes all their hits except "Got 2 Have Ya", which was only released as a CD single in Europe, and the Christmas song "Give Love on Christmas Day" (originally recorded by the Jackson 5), which can be found exclusively on a Christmas compilation from the German magazine Bravo entitled Bravo Christmas Vol. 3 (1996/9).

=== 1998–2000: Goodman's second departure, Graham's departure and disbandment ===
Goodman left once again and then joined R&B girl group Honeyz. Graham also left and pursued a solo career. After their departures, Onslow and Cariera decided to stay with Solid Harmonie and went back to Orlando, Florida in 1999 where they had several successful tours. Soon Puerto Rican Jenilca Franchesca Giusti joined the band in 1999 after an audition held in Cariera's hometown Orlando, Florida and started briefly recording for the second studio album. The new Solid Harmonie trio was on the cover of TeenFaces magazine on its October issue. Their second album was never released as they could not come to an agreement with their record label, or find a new one once they were without a label. After legal issues, the group lost their recording contract and disbanded. The band eventually disbanded in the early 2000s to embark on solo careers.

=== 2014–present: "Circus" and Two ===
In 2014, Solid HarmoniE released a single, "Circus", with the lineup of Graham, Onslow and Cariera. However, they did not release any further singles, and no album materialised.

In July 2022, a newly mastered version of Solid HarmoniE's shelved second album (recorded by Onslow, Cariera and Giusti) was released under the title Two. This included the tracks "Make Me" (later recorded by Jennifer Paige), "World Without You" (originally recorded by Trine Rein and later by Wild Orchid and Tammin), "Over the Edge" (later recorded by 3 of Hearts) and "Intuition" (later recorded by Liz).

In April 2025, Graham, Onslow and Cariera announced on Dutch national radio station Qmusic the official comeback of Solid HarmoniE. Also, there will be released new music as well as new performances coming up. Solid HarmoniE now is under exclusive management by Dutch Entertainment Group and Milestone Bookings.

On 27 November 2025 a brand new single, "Once Again It's Christmas", was released on Solid HarmoniE Records. This was followed in June 2026 by the single "The Last Time", a cover of the song by the Swedish girl group Sheelah.

== Musical style ==
Solid Harmonie's debut album was heavily influenced by similar teen pop acts from that period, which was made famous and popular by similar artists such as the more successful Spice Girls, credited for being the pioneers that paved the way for the commercial breakthrough of teen pop in the late 1990s, Backstreet Boys or NSYNC. Teen pop songwriter pioneer Max Martin wrote all of the singles on that album. The shelved follow-up album, Two, had more of an R&B influence but was still very pop-leaning.

== Members ==
Members	1996	1997	1998	1999	2000	2014	2025
Rebecca Onslow (1996–2000, 2013–2014; 2025–present)							
Melissa Graham (1996–1999, 2013–2014; 2025–present)							
Elisa Cariera (1997–2000, 2013–2014; 2025–present)							
Mariama Goodman (1996–1997, 1997–1999)							
Jenilca Giusti (1999–2000)							

== Discography ==
=== Albums ===
List of albums, with selected chart positions
Title	Album details	Peak chart positions						
Title	Album details	UK	BEL	FIN	JPN	NLD	NOR	SWE
Solid HarmoniE	Released: 1997; Formats: CD, cassette	111	33	4	22	2	40	12
Two	Released: 2022; Formats: Digital, limited CD	—	—	—	—	—	—	—

=== Singles ===
List of singles, with selected chart positions
Title	Year	Peak chart positions										Album
Title	Year	UK	AUS	BEL (FL)	FIN	FRA	GER	NLD	NOR	SWE	SWI	Album
"Got 2 Have Ya"	1996	—	—	—	—	—	65	—	—	—	—	Non-album single
"I'll Be There for You"	1997	18	83	—	—	83	—	9	—	9	—	Solid HarmoniE
"I Want You to Want Me"	1998	16	—	48	10	—	64	4	14	10	39	Solid HarmoniE
"I Wanna Love You"	1998	20	—	—	—	—	93	30	—	39	—	Solid HarmoniE
"To Love Once Again"	1998	55	—	—	—	—	—	46	—	—	—	Solid HarmoniE
"Circus"	2014	—	—	—	—	—	—	—	—	—	—	Non-album single
Once Again It's Christmas	2025											Non-album single
"—" denotes singles that did not chart or were not released in that territory

=== Music videos ===
Year	Title	Director(s)
1996	"Got 2 Have Ya"	—
1997	"I'll Be There for You"	Gerry Wenner
1998	"I Want You to Want Me"	Roger Pomphrey
1998	"I Wanna Love You"	Max & Dania
1998	"To Love Once Again"	Paul Morgans
