= Nutty Professor II: The Klumps (soundtrack) =

Nutty Professor II: The Klumps – Soundtrack

Soundtrack album to Nutty Professor II: The Klumps by various artists
- Released: July 11, 2000
- Recorded: 1999–2000
- Studio: various: Manhattan Center (New York, NY); A Touch Of Jazz Studios (Philadelphia, PA); The Edge; Mirror Image Recorders (New York, NY); The Hit Factory Criteria; Backroom Studios (Glendale, CA); Sound on Sound Studios (New York, NY); Soundtrack Studios (New York, NY); Quad Recording Studios (New York, NY); The Hit Factory (New York, NY); Sony Music Studios (New York, NY); Sound Stage Studios (Nashville, TN); Darkchild Studios (Pleasantville, NJ); Record Plant (Los Angeles, CA); Rockin' Reel Recording Studios (New York, NY); 54 Sound (Ferndale, MI); Rockland Studios (Chicago, IL)
- Genres: R&B; hip hop
- Length: 1:11:26
- Label: Def Jam
- Producers: Brian McKnight; Carvin & Ivan; Christopher "Deep" Henderson; Darkchild; Erick Sermon; Janet Jackson; Jimmy Jam and Terry Lewis; JoJo Brim; Montell Jordan; P. Killer Trackz; P. King; Redhead Kingpin; R. Kelly; Sisqó; Teflon; Tim & Bob; Timbaland

Singles from Nutty Professor II: The Klumps
- 1. "Doesn't Really Matter" Released: May 23, 2000; 2. "Hey Papi" Released: July 11, 2000; 3. "Not Even Gonna Trip" Released: July 12, 2000; 4. "Just Friends (Sunny)" Released: August 29, 2000; 5. "Even If" Released: January 8, 2001; 6. "Missing You" Released: February 20, 2001

Professional ratings
Review scores
Source	Rating
AllMusic	3/5 stars
Entertainment Weekly	B+
RapReviews	7/10
The New Zealand Herald	2/5 stars

Nutty Professor II: The Klumps – Soundtrack is the soundtrack album to Peter Segal's 2000 comedy film Nutty Professor II: The Klumps. It was released on July 11, 2000, through Def Jam Recordings, as a sequel to 1996 The Nutty Professor Soundtrack, and mainly composed of R&B and hip hop music.

Recording sessions took place at Manhattan Center, Mirror Image Recorders, Sound on Sound Studios, Soundtrack Studios, Quad Recording Studios, The Hit Factory, Sony Music Studios and Rockin' Reel Recording Studios in New York City, at A Touch Of Jazz Studios in Philadelphia, at The Edge, at The Hit Factory Criteria, at Backroom Studios in Glendale, at Sound Stage Studios in Nashville, at Darkchild Studios in Pleasantville, at Record Plant in Los Angeles, at 54 Sound in Ferndale, and at Rockland Studios in Chicago.

Production was handled by Tim & Bob, Erick Sermon, Brian McKnight, Carvin & Ivan, Christopher "Deep" Henderson, Janet Jackson, Jimmy Jam and Terry Lewis, JoJo Brim, Montell Jordan, P. Killer Trackz, P. King "The Specialist", Redhead Kingpin, R. Kelly, Rodney Jerkins, Sisqó, Howard Perl, Teflon and Timbaland, with Brian Grazer, Gary Jones, Happy Walters, Harry Garfield, Kevin Liles and Lyor Cohen serving as executive producers.

It features contributions from Amil, Brian McKnight, Case, DMX, Dyme, Eminem, Eve, Foxy Brown, Janet Jackson, Jay-Z, Jazz, Kandice Love, Memphis Bleek, Method Man, Montell Jordan, Musiq Soulchild, Redman, R. Kelly, Shorty 101 and Sisqó.

In the United States, the album debuted at number 4 on the Billboard 200 and topped the Top R&B/Hip-Hop Albums. It was certified Platinum by the Recording Industry Association of America on August 24, 2000.

The album was supported with six singles. Its lead single, "Doesn't Really Matter" topped the Billboard Hot 100 and later appeared in Janet Jackson's seventh studio album All for You (2001). The second single of the soundtrack, "Hey Papi", made it to number 76 on the US Hot 100. "Just Friends (Sunny)" peaked at number 31 on the US Hot 100 and later was featured in Musiq's debut studio album Aijuswanaseing (2000). The song "Not Even Gonna Trip" by British R&B group Honeyz was recorded for the UK version of the album and released as a single, which peaked at number 24 on the UK Singles Chart, but was not included in the film. The song "Even If", which also wasn't featured in the film, was not a success, reaching only number 118 on the US Hot R&B/Hip-Hop Songs. The album's final single, "Missing You", peaked at number 4 on US Hot 100 and received a Grammy Award for Best Male R&B Vocal Performance nomination, but was replaced in UK/European editions of the compilation with Jayo Felony's "Hotta Than Fish Grease". Nevertheless, neither "Missing You" nor "Hotta Than Fish Grease" were featured in the film.

== Track listing ==
No.	Title	Writer(s)	Producer(s)	Length
1.	"Doesn't Really Matter" (performed by Janet Jackson)	Janet Jackson; James Harris III; Terry Lewis	Janet Jackson; Jimmy Jam and Terry Lewis	4:56
2.	"Hey Papi" (performed by Jay-Z, Memphis Bleek and Amil)	Shawn Carter; Malik Cox; Timothy Mosley	Timbaland	4:28
3.	"Just Friends (Sunny)" (performed by Musiq Soulchild)	Taalib Johnson; Carvin Haggins; Ivan Barias; Robert Von Hebb; Vidal Davis	Carvin & Ivan	4:05
4.	"Missing You" (performed by Case)	Joseph Thomas; Joshua Paul Thompson; Tim Kelley; Bob Robinson	Tim & Bob	4:45
5.	"Even If" (performed by Method Man)	Clifford Smith; Peter Francis; Corey Woods; Dennis Coles; Gary Grice; Jason Hunter; Lamont Hawkins; Robert Diggs; Russell Jones	P. King; Erick Sermon (add.)	2:58
6.	"I'm Gonna Crawl" (performed by DMX and Dyme)	Earl Simmons; Anthony Fields	P. Killer Trackz	4:10
7.	"Thinkin' 'Bout Me" (performed by Brian McKnight)	Brian McKnight	Brian McKnight	4:18
8.	"Here With Me" (performed by Jazz)	Christopher Henderson	Christopher "Deep" Henderson; Nokio (add.)	4:56
9.	"No You Didn't Say" (performed by Kandice Love)	Karen Anderson; David Guppy	Redhead Kingpin	4:29
10.	"Let Me Be" (performed by Eve)	Eve Jeffers; Sheldon Harris	Teflon; Rich Keller (add.)	3:50
11.	"Get With Me" (performed by Shorty 101)	Rodney Jerkins; LaShawn Daniels; Mischke Butler	Darkchild	4:08
12.	"Do You Remember (Once Upon a Time)" (performed by Montell Jordan)	Montell Jordan; Joseph Brim	Montell Jordan; JoJo "Joey Bangs" Brim	4:10
13.	"Thong Song (Uncensored)" (performed by Sisqó and Foxy Brown)	Mark Andrews; Kelley; Robinson; Robert Edward Rosa Suárez; John Charles Barrett; Joseph Longo	Sisqó; Tim & Bob	4:11
14.	"Off the Wall" (performed by Redman and Eminem)	Reginald Noble; Marshall Mathers; Erick Sermon	Erick Sermon	3:56
15.	"Just a Touch" (performed by R. Kelly)	Robert Kelly	R. Kelly	4:15

Bonus
No.	Title	Length
16.	"Sneak Preview from LL Cool J's New Album G.O.A.T."	7:51
Total length:		1:11:26

UK version
No.	Title	Writer(s)	Producer(s)	Length
17.	"Not Even Gonna Trip" (performed by Honeyz)	Gregory Charley	Gregory Charley	3:50

Sample credits

- Track 3 contains elements from "Sunny" written by Bobby Hebb.
- Track 5 contains elements from "Protect Ya Neck" written by Wu-Tang Clan.

== Charts ==
=== Weekly charts ===
Chart (2000)	Peak position
Australian Albums (ARIA)	42
Dutch Albums (Album Top 100)	99
German Albums (Offizielle Top 100)	67
New Zealand Albums (RMNZ)	32
Swiss Albums (Schweizer Hitparade)	95
UK R&B Albums (Official Charts)	21
US Billboard 200	4
US Top R&B/Hip-Hop Albums (Billboard)	1

=== Year-end charts ===
Chart (2000)	Position
Canadian Albums (Nielsen SoundScan)	125

== Certifications ==
Region	Certification	Certified units/sales
United States (RIAA)	Platinum	1,000,000^{^}
^{^} Shipments figures based on certification alone.

== See also ==
- List of Billboard number-one R&B albums of 2000
