= Finally Found =

1998 single by Honeyz

Single by Honeyz

from the album Wonder No. 8
- B-side: "In the Street"; "Summertime"
- Released: 24 August 1998
- Genre: Nu-soul
- Length: 4:47 (album version); 4:09 (Rude Boy Mix)
- Label: Mercury; 1st Avenue
- Songwriters: Yoyo Olugbo; Henry Binns; Honeyz
- Producer: Steve Levine

Honeyz singles chronology
"Finally Found" (1998)	"End of the Line" (1998)

Music video
- "Finally Found" on YouTube

"Finally Found" is the debut single of British girl group Honeyz. It was released on 24 August 1998 by Mercury and 1st Avenue Records as the lead single from their debut album, Wonder No. 8 (1998). The song was their most successful single in the UK and worldwide, peaking at number four on the UK Singles Chart and earning platinum status in Australia, where it peaked at number three. It reached the top 20 in Denmark, Ireland, New Zealand, and Sweden.

The song was given a slightly different mix for single release, titled the "Rude Boy Mix". This mix adds background instrumentation and more backing vocals during the song while omitting the instrumental intro and spoken French towards the end of the album version. The single was digitized, along with all other official Honeyz singles, for release on digital music stores and streaming services on 14 May 2021. The "Finally Found" single included all officially released versions of the song, plus a previously unused "radio edit" which is a different mix from both the single and album versions.

The group performed the song in 2005 for the ITV series Hit Me, Baby, One More Time, performed with the original lineup (Célena Cherry, Heavenli Denton and Naima Belkhiati).

== Critical reception ==
Scottish Daily Record described the song as a "London-style swing beat tune". Caroline Sullivan from The Guardian felt it "faithfully reproduces the well-mannered nu-soul sound of the current American charts." Music Week named it Single of the Week, writing, "The debut single from former MW Ones To Watch, the Honeyz - namely Heavenli, Celena and Niama - is a real beauty, suggesting this act will be strong contenders in the pop R&B stakes. The song showcases the girls' vocal ability, riding a laidback melody that becomes increasingly addictive on each listen. The song has rightly achieved Radio One B-list status, and promises much more to come." Matt Bell from Sound on Sound praised it as "a smooth gospel‑tinged ballad decked out with crystalline multitracked block harmonies". Ian Hyland from Sunday Mirror gave "Finally Found" seven out of ten, adding, "Naff name but everyonez moneyz on these soul ladies to make it big. Nice tummyz."

== Track listings ==
- UK and Australian CD1
1. "Finally Found" (Rude Boy Mix) – 4:09
2. "In the Street" (Ignorants Mix) – 5:29
3. "Summertime" – 3:49
- UK and Australian CD2
1. "Finally Found" (Rude Boy Mix) – 4:09
2. "Summertime" (Booker T Summer Groove Mix) – 5:53
3. "Summertime" (Booker T Summer Groove Dub) – 5:53
- UK cassette single and European CD single
1. "Finally Found" (Rude Boy Mix) – 4:09
2. "In the Street" (Ignorants Mix) – 5:29
- 2021 digital release
1. "Finally Found" (radio edit) – 3:43
2. "Finally Found" (Rude Boy Mix) – 4:09
3. "Finally Found" (U-Nam Remix) – 4:37
4. "Finally Found" (backing track / competition version) – 3:45
5. "In the Street" (Ignorants Mix) – 5:28
6. "In the Street" (2001 Mix) – 5:34
7. "Summertime" – 3:50
8. "Summertime" (Booker T Summer Groove Mix) – 5:54
9. "Summertime" (Booker T Summer Groove Dub) – 5:55
10. "Summertime" (Love to Infinity's Stingray Mix) – 3:34

Note: Tracks 1 and 10 were previously unreleased commercially. Tracks 4 and 6 were originally released on "Love of a Lifetime" CD2 and "I Don't Know" CD2 respectively.

== Charts ==
=== Weekly charts ===
Chart (1998–1999)	Peak position
Australia (ARIA)	3
Denmark (IFPI)	20
Europe (Eurochart Hot 100)	20
Iceland (Íslenski Listinn Topp 40)	24
Ireland (IRMA)	4
Netherlands (Dutch Top 40)	21
Netherlands (Single Top 100)	23
New Zealand (Recorded Music NZ)	12
Scotland Singles (OCC)	8
Sweden (Sverigetopplistan)	6
UK Singles (OCC)	4
UK Airplay (Music Week)	7
UK Hip Hop/R&B (OCC)	1

=== Year-end charts ===
Chart (1998)	Position
Australia (ARIA)	22
Sweden (Hitlistan)	44
UK Singles (OCC)	36

Chart (1999)	Position
Netherlands (Dutch Top 40)	183

== Certifications ==
Region	Certification	Certified units/sales
Australia (ARIA)	Platinum	70,000^{^}
Sweden (GLF)	Gold	15,000^{^}
United Kingdom (BPI)	Gold	400,000^{^}
^{^} Shipments figures based on certification alone.
