= Solid HarmoniE (album) =

Studio album by Solid HarmoniE
- Released: 7 April 1998
- Recorded: 1996–1997
- Genre: Pop
- Length: 48:56
- Labels: Sony BMG, Jive (Zomba Music Group)
- Producers: Max Martin; Kristian Lundin; Jacob Schulze; TTW; Per Magnusson; David Krueger; Timmy Allen; Larry "Rock" Campbell

Solid HarmoniE chronology
Solid HarmoniE (1998)	Two (2022)

Singles from Solid HarmoniE
- 1. "I'll Be There for You" Released: 1997; 2. "I Want You to Want Me" Released: 1998; 3. "I Wanna Love You" Released: 1998; 4. "To Love Once Again" Released: 9 November 1998

Professional ratings
Review scores
Source	Rating
Music Week	(favorable)

Solid HarmoniE is the only album by the British-American girl group Solid HarmoniE, released in 1998, by Jive Records. It features their two biggest hit singles "I'll Be There For You" and "I Want You To Want Me". It was certified Gold in the Netherlands where it peaked at number 2 and spent 24 weeks in the album chart. It peaked in the top 5 in Finland.

The album spawned four singles: "I'll Be There for You", "I Want You to Want Me", "I Wanna Love You", and "To Love Once Again". The former three peaked in the top 20 in their native United Kingdom.

== Track listing ==
Solid HarmoniE track listing
No.	Title	Writer(s)	Producer(s)	Length
1.	"I'll Be There for You"	Max Martin; Kristian Lundin	Max Martin; Kristian Lundin	3:12
2.	"I Want You to Want Me"	Max Martin; Jacob "Jake" Schulze	Max Martin; Jacob "Jake" Schulze	3:31
3.	"To Love Once Again"	Max Martin; Kristian Lundin	Max Martin; Kristian Lundin	3:30
4.	"Come and Get It"	Kim Sanders; Hubert Nitsch	TTW	3:34
5.	"Walk Away"	Keith Beauvais; Dave James	Per Magnusson; David Krueger	4:24
6.	"You Got the Flava"	Mark Topham; Karl Twigg	TTW	3:49
7.	"He's Playing Hard to Get"	Timmy Allen; W. Walton	Timmy Allen; Larry "Rock" Campbell	4:24
8.	"Forever I Do"	J. Skinner; Veit Renn	Veit Renn	4:37
9.	"I Wanna Love You"	Max Martin; Kristian Lundin	Kristian Lundin	4:17
10.	"Fantasy"	Veit Renn	Veit Renn	4:41
11.	"I Gotta Get My Groove On"	J. Skinner; Veit Renn	Veit Renn	4:08
12.	"When We Kiss (Missing You)"	Timmy Allen; J. Skinner; A. Smith; L. Campbell; J. St. James	Timmy Allen; Larry "Rock" Campbell	4:49
Total length:				48:56

Japanese edition bonus tracks
No.	Title	Writer(s)	Producer(s)	Length
13.	"The Right Way"	Topham; Twigg	TTW	2:52
14.	"Live a Little"	J. Skinner; Veit Renn	Veit Renn	4:06
Total length:				55:54

== Charts ==
Chart (1998)	Peak position
Belgian Albums Chart (Flanders)	33
Dutch Albums Chart	2
Finnish Albums Chart	4
Norwegian Albums Chart	40
Swedish Albums Chart	12
UK Albums Chart	111

== Certifications ==
Region	Certification	Certified units/sales
Japan (RIAJ)	Gold	100,000^{^}
Netherlands (NVPI)	Gold	50,000^{^}
^{^} Shipments figures based on certification alone.
