= C.L.L Crystal Lover Light =

C.L.L. Crystal Lover Light

Studio album by Crystal Kay
- Released: March 23, 2000
- Recorded: 1999–2000
- Genre: J-pop; indie; R&B; acoustic; electronica
- Length: 51:59
- Language: Japanese
- Label: Epic

Crystal Kay chronology
C.L.L. Crystal Lover Light (2000)	637: Always and Forever (2001)

Singles from C.L.L Crystal Lover Light
- 1. "Eternal Memories" Released: July 1, 1999; 2. "Teenage Universe: Chewing Gum Baby" Released: September 8, 1999; 3. "Komichi no Hana" Released: November 3, 1999; 4. "Shadows of Desire" Released: March 23, 2000

C.L.L Crystal Lover Light is Crystal Kay's first album. The album was released when she was 14 years old. Unlike her later albums, this release contains other styles of music than urban pop, with several songs being acoustic and containing a blues vibe. The song "Shadows of Desire" was released as a single, simultaneously with the album. This album reached #60 on the weekly Oricon chart, and stayed on the chart for four weeks. In all, the album sold a total of 19,930 copies.

== Track listing ==
No.	Title	Length
1.	"Interlude P.P.P."	1:10
2.	"Eternal Memories"	5:08
3.	"こみちの花 (Komichi no Hana)"	4:01
4.	"More Lovin'"	4:12
5.	"Teenage Universe: Chewing Gum Baby"	4:01
6.	"レッツすいかどろぼう (Let's Suika Dorobo)"	5:06
7.	"タカ・タカ・タカ (Taka Taka Taka)"	3:42
8.	"ダーリン P.P.P. (Darling P.P.P.)"	4:02
9.	"トゥデー・フレンド・ザ・デコレーション・ケーキ・かうかう・Go (Today Friend The Decoration Cake Kau Kau Go)"	2:50
10.	"つれないギター (Tsunerai Guitar)"	1:08
11.	"パパどんピ (Papa Donpi)"	4:36
12.	"Rainy Blue Day"	4:15
13.	"C'mon Babe"	3:51
14.	"Shadows of Desire"	3:55

== Charts ==
Release	Chart	Peak position	First week sales	Sales total	Chart Run
March 23, 2000	Oricon Daily Charts				
March 23, 2000	Oricon Weekly Charts	60		19,390	
March 23, 2000	Oricon Monthly Charts				
March 23, 2000	Oricon Yearly Charts				

== Release history ==
Country	Date	Label	Format	Catalogue #
Japan	March 23, 2000	Epic	Compact disc	ESCB-2042
