= Never Let You Down =

1999 single by Honeyz

Single by Honeyz

from the album Wonder No. 8
- B-side: "Summertime"; "The Way You Make Me Feel"
- Released: 11 October 1999
- Length: 3:33
- Label: Mercury; 1st Avenue
- Songwriters: Dawn Joseph; Lucy Abbott; Peter Kearney; Sara Eker; Steve Robson
- Producers: Steve Robson; Denis Ingoldsby

Honeyz singles chronology
"Love of a Lifetime" (1999)	"Never Let You Down" (1999)	"Won't Take It Lying Down" (2000)

Alternative cover
- UK CD2 cover

"Never Let You Down" is a song by British R&B girl group Honeyz. It was released in October 1999 as the fourth single from their debut studio album, Wonder No. 8 (1998). It was their first single to feature vocals from new member Mariama Goodman.

== Track listings ==
UK CD1

1. "Never Let You Down"
2. "Summertime"
3. "The Way You Make Me Feel"

UK CD2

1. "Never Let You Down" (radio edit)
2. "Never Let You Down" (Honky Mix)
3. "Never Let You Down" (Can 7 Low Tide Mix)
4. "Never Let You Down" (video)
- Mislabels the first track as the video

UK cassette single

1. "Never Let You Down"
2. "The Way You Make Me Feel"

Australian CD single

1. "Never Let You Down"
2. "What Does She Look Like?"
3. "Keep Me Hanging On"
4. "Never Let You Down" (Honky Mix)
5. "Never Let You Down" (Can 7 Low Tide Mix)

== Charts ==
=== Weekly charts ===
Chart (1999)	Peak position
Europe (Eurochart Hot 100)	32
Scottish Singles Sales (Official Charts)	19
UK Singles (Official Charts)	7
UK Airplay (Music Week)	14
UK Hip Hop/R&B (Official Charts)	2

=== Year-end charts ===
Chart (1999)	Position
UK Singles (OCC)	180
