= 637: Always and Forever =

Studio album by Crystal Kay
- Released: August 22, 2001
- Recorded: 2001
- Genre: J-pop, R&B
- Length: 48:22
- Label: Epic

Crystal Kay chronology
C.L.L Crystal Lover Light (2000)	637: Always and Forever (2001)	Almost Seventeen (2002)

Singles from 637: Always and Forever
- 1. "Lost Child (with Shinichi Osawa and Hiroshi Fujiwara)" Released: February 15, 2001; 2. "Girl's Night" Released: May 9, 2001; 3. "Ex-Boyfriend (feat. Verbal (M-Flo)" Released: July 4, 2001

637: Always and Forever is the second album by Japanese singer and actress Crystal Kay. It is her first R&B record; After the release of her debut album C.L.L Crystal Lover Light, Crystal started to move towards her new sound and made the transition with the single "Girl's Night". The album 637 features songs produced by well-known Japanese urban musicians Verbal, T-Kura, and Michico.

The album reached #19 on the weekly Oricon chart, and continued to rank for eight weeks. In all selling a total of 48,550 copies.

== Track listing ==
No.	Title	Length
1.	"Girl's Night"	4:22
2.	"Interlude: My Ex"	0:26
3.	"Ex-Boyfriend feat. Verbal (M-Flo)"	5:10
4.	"Curious"	4:19
5.	"He Will Be Mine"	4:30
6.	"Another Best Thing"	4:20
7.	"Guardian Angel"	4:20
8.	"Interlude: Conditioner"	0:55
9.	"Honey Glue"	5:29
10.	"月のない夜 道のない場所 (Tsuki no Nai Yoru, Michi no Nai Bashou)"	4:23
11.	"Holiday Fighter"	4:04
12.	"Couldn't Care Less"	3:48
13.	"Lost Child (with Shinichi Osawa and Hiroshi Fujiwara)"	6:38

== Charts ==
Release	Chart	Peak position	Sales total
August 22, 2001	Oricon Weekly Charts	19	48,550

== Release history ==
Country	Date	Label	Format	Catalogue #
Japan	August 22, 2001	Epic	Compact disc	ESCB-2257
