= Won't Take It Lying Down =

2000 single by Honeyz

Single by Honeyz

from the album Wonder No. 8
- B-side: "What Does She Look Like?", "Keep Me Hanging On"
- Released: 28 February 2000
- Length: 4:13
- Label: Mercury, 1st Avenue
- Songwriters: Anders Bagge, Arnthor Birgisson, Simon Climie
- Producer: Simon Climie

Honeyz singles chronology
"Never Let You Down" (1999)	"Won't Take It Lying Down" (2000)	"Not Even Gonna Trip" (2000)

Alternative cover
- UK CD2 cover

"Won't Take It Lying Down" is a song by British-based girl group Honeyz, released as the group's fifth single from their debut studio album, Wonder No. 8 (1998). It was their last single with member Mariama Goodman, who was later replaced by original member Heavenli Abdi.

== Track listings ==
UK CD1

1. "Won't Take It Lying Down" (Ollie Twist mix)
2. "What Does She Look Like?"
3. "Keep Me Hanging On"
4. "Won't Take It Lying Down" (Ollie Twist mix video)

UK CD2

1. "Won't Take It Lying Down" (Ollie Twist mix)
2. "Won't Take It Lying Down" (LA mix)
3. "Won't Take It Lying Down" (Twist Future mix)

UK cassette single

1. "Won't Take It Lying Down" (Ollie Twist mix)
2. "What Does She Look Like?"

European maxi-CD single

1. "Won't Take It Lying Down" (Ollie Twist mix)
2. "Won't Take It Lying Down" (LA mix)
3. "What Does She Look Like?"
4. "Won't Take It Lying Down" (Ollie Twist mix video)

== Charts ==
=== Weekly charts ===
Chart (2000)	Peak position
Europe (Eurochart Hot 100)	30
Ireland (IRMA)	30
Netherlands (Dutch Top 40 Tipparade)	6
Scottish Singles Sales (Official Charts)	10
UK Singles (Official Charts)	7
UK Airplay (Music Week)	7
UK Hip Hop/R&B (Official Charts)	2

=== Year-end charts ===
Chart (2000)	Position
UK Singles (OCC)	140
UK Airplay (Music Week)	46
