= End of the Line (Honeyz song) =

1998 single by Honeyz

Single by Honeyz

from the album Wonder No. 8
- B-side: "Keep Me Hanging On"; "Don't Run Away"
- Released: 7 December 1998
- Length: 4:50 (original mix); 4:58 (Rude Boy mix); 4:08 (Rude Boy mix edit)
- Label: Mercury; 1st Avenue
- Songwriter: Paul Begaud
- Producer: Steve Levine

Honeyz singles chronology
"Finally Found" (1998)	"End of the Line" (1998)	"Love of a Lifetime" (1999)

"End of the Line" is a song by British girl group Honeyz. It was released as the group's second single on 7 December 1998 and peaked at number five on the UK Singles Chart, spending 16 weeks in the top 100 to become Honeyz' longest-charting single. It also reached number one on the UK R&B Chart and became the group's second top-40 hit in Australia, Iceland, Ireland, and Sweden. The single has sold 360,000 copies in the UK alone. On 27 March 2015, the Official Charts Company inducted "End of the Line" into their Pop Gem Hall of Fame, which celebrates "overlooked classics and huge hits of yesteryear". The song was chosen as the "Ultimate Goodbye Song".

== Versions ==
The song was remixed by Rude Boy, similarly to the album's third single "Love of a Lifetime", and this is the version included on both the single and album. The original mix remained unreleased commercially until 2006's The Collection album. A 4:30 promo edit of the original was later released on 14 May 2021 when all of the Honeyz original single releases were digitized for release on digital music stores and streaming services.

Composed by Australian songwriter Paul Begaud, the song was first recorded a year earlier in 1997, included on the 1997 Jelita compilation album by Warner Music Malaysia and titled "Di Akhir Garisan" ("At the End of the Line") sung by Malaysians Ziana Zain, Ning Baizura and Nora; and Indonesian Dessy Fitri. The Malay version was unique with Dessy's whistle note during her part.

== Track listings ==
UK CD1

1. "End of the Line" (Rude Boy mix) – 4:58
2. "Keep Me Hanging On" – 3:32
3. "Don't Run Away" – 4:46

UK CD2

1. "End of the Line" (Rude Boy mix) – 4:58
2. "End of the Line" (Ignorants club mix) – 5:52
3. "End of the Line" (Rude Boy mix edit) – 3:59
4. "End of the Line" (video)

UK cassette single and European CD single

1. "End of the Line" (Rude Boy mix) – 4:58
2. "Keep Me Hanging On" – 3:32

Australian CD1

1. "End of the Line" (Rude Boy mix) – 4:58
2. "Keep Me Hanging On" – 3:32
3. "Don't Run Away" – 4:46
4. "End of the Line" (Ignorants club mix) – 5:52

Australian CD2

1. "End of the Line" (Rude Boy mix) – 4:58
2. "End of the Line" (Ignorants club mix) – 5:52
3. "End of the Line" (Rude Boy mix edit) – 3:59
4. "End of the Line" (Cas Roc mix) – 6:31
5. "End of the Line" (Cas Roc instrumental) – 6:31
6. "End of the Line" (enhanced video)

== Charts ==
=== Weekly charts ===
Chart (1998–1999)	Peak position
Australia (ARIA)	24
Europe (Eurochart Hot 100)	27
Germany (GfK)	90
Iceland (Íslenski Listinn Topp 40)	12
Ireland (IRMA)	7
Netherlands (Dutch Top 40 Tipparade)	17
Netherlands (Single Top 100)	93
Scottish Singles Sales (Official Charts)	8
Sweden (Sverigetopplistan)	35
UK Singles (Official Charts)	5
UK Airplay (Music Week)	3
UK Hip Hop/R&B (Official Charts)	1

=== Year-end charts ===
Chart (1998)	Position
UK Singles (OCC)	73

Chart (1999)	Position
UK Singles (OCC)	161

== Certifications ==
Region	Certification	Certified units/sales
United Kingdom (BPI)	Silver	360,000
