= Love of a Lifetime (Honeyz song) =

1999 single by Honeyz

Single by Honeyz

from the album Wonder No. 8
- B-side: "Do Me Baby"
- Released: 12 April 1999
- Length: 3:33 (original mix); 3:49 (Rude Boy mix); 3:28 (Rude Boy remix)
- Label: Mercury; 1st Avenue
- Songwriters: Sylvia Bennett-Smith; Laney Stewart
- Producer: Steve Levine

Honeyz singles chronology
"End of the Line" (1998)	"Love of a Lifetime" (1999)	"Never Let You Down" (1999)

Alternative cover
- Australian cover featuring Mariama Goodman

"Love of a Lifetime" is a song by English girl group Honeyz, released as the group's third single from their debut studio album, Wonder No.8 (1998), on 12 April 1999. It was their last single at the time with co-founding member Heavenli Abdi, following her departure weeks before the song's release. The song reached number nine on the UK Singles Chart, number 26 in Ireland and number 64 in Australia. The "Rude Boy" remix was released as a single, and a slightly different Rude Boy mix was included on both the original 1998 album and 1999 reissue, however the original version was released for the first time on the group's 2006 The Collection album.

== Music video ==
The official music video was directed by Bille Woodruff. It features a large group of young people dancing in a room, whilst the Honeyz perform in the foreground. There are also scenes featuring the group singing against a red backdrop and on a stage in front of a gold wall, as well as Naima Belkhiati and Célena Cherry in black leather catsuits with a man each.

Multiple versions of the video were released. Initially, the video featured founding member Heavenli Abdi. A second cut was released where she was heavily edited out of the video, due to her abrupt departure from the group prior to the video's official release. A third version was then released with scenes featuring new member Mariama Goodman, who joined the group following Heavenli Abdi's departure.

== Track listings ==
UK CD1

1. "Love of a Lifetime" (Rude Boy remix) – 3:28
2. "Do Me Baby" – 3:59
3. "Love of a Lifetime" (Ignorantz remix) – 5:04

UK CD2

1. "Love of a Lifetime" (Rude Boy remix) – 3:28
2. "Love of a Lifetime" (live at Club Avenue mix) – 3:44
3. "Finally Found" (backing track/competition version) – 3:44

UK cassette single and German CD single

1. "Love of a Lifetime" (Rude Boy remix) – 3:28
2. "Do Me Baby" – 3:59

Australian CD single

1. "Love of a Lifetime" (Rude Boy remix)
2. "Love of a Lifetime" (Stevie J remix)
3. "Love of a Lifetime" (Yearning 4 Your Love remix)
4. "Love of a Lifetime" (Ignorantz extended club mix)
5. "Love of a Lifetime" (live at Club Avenue mix)
6. "Love of a Lifetime" (Submission mix)

Digital download

1. "Love of a Lifetime" – 3:34
2. "Love of a Lifetime" (Rude Boy remix) – 3:31
3. "Love of a Lifetime" (Rude Boy mix) – 3:49
4. "Love of a Lifetime" (Ignorantz remix) – 5:05
5. "Love of a Lifetime" (Ignorantz extended club mix) – 5:07
6. "Love of a Lifetime" (Club Avenue mix) – 3:34
7. "Love of a Lifetime" (Submission mix) – 5:05
8. "Love of a Lifetime" (Stevie J remix) – 3:57
9. "Love of a Lifetime" (Yearning 4 Your Love remix) – 3:48
10. "Love of a Lifetime" (DJ Watarai remix) – 3:39
11. "Love of a Lifetime" (club mix 12-inch) – 4:35
12. "Do Me Baby" – 3:59

== Charts ==
=== Weekly charts ===
Chart (1999)	Peak position
Australia (ARIA)	64
Europe (Eurochart Hot 100)	37
Ireland (IRMA)	26
Scotland (OCC)	13
UK Singles (OCC)	9
UK Airplay (Music Week)	6
UK Hip Hop/R&B (OCC)	4

=== Year-end charts ===
Chart (1999)	Position
UK Singles (OCC)	156
