= Honeyz =

British girl group

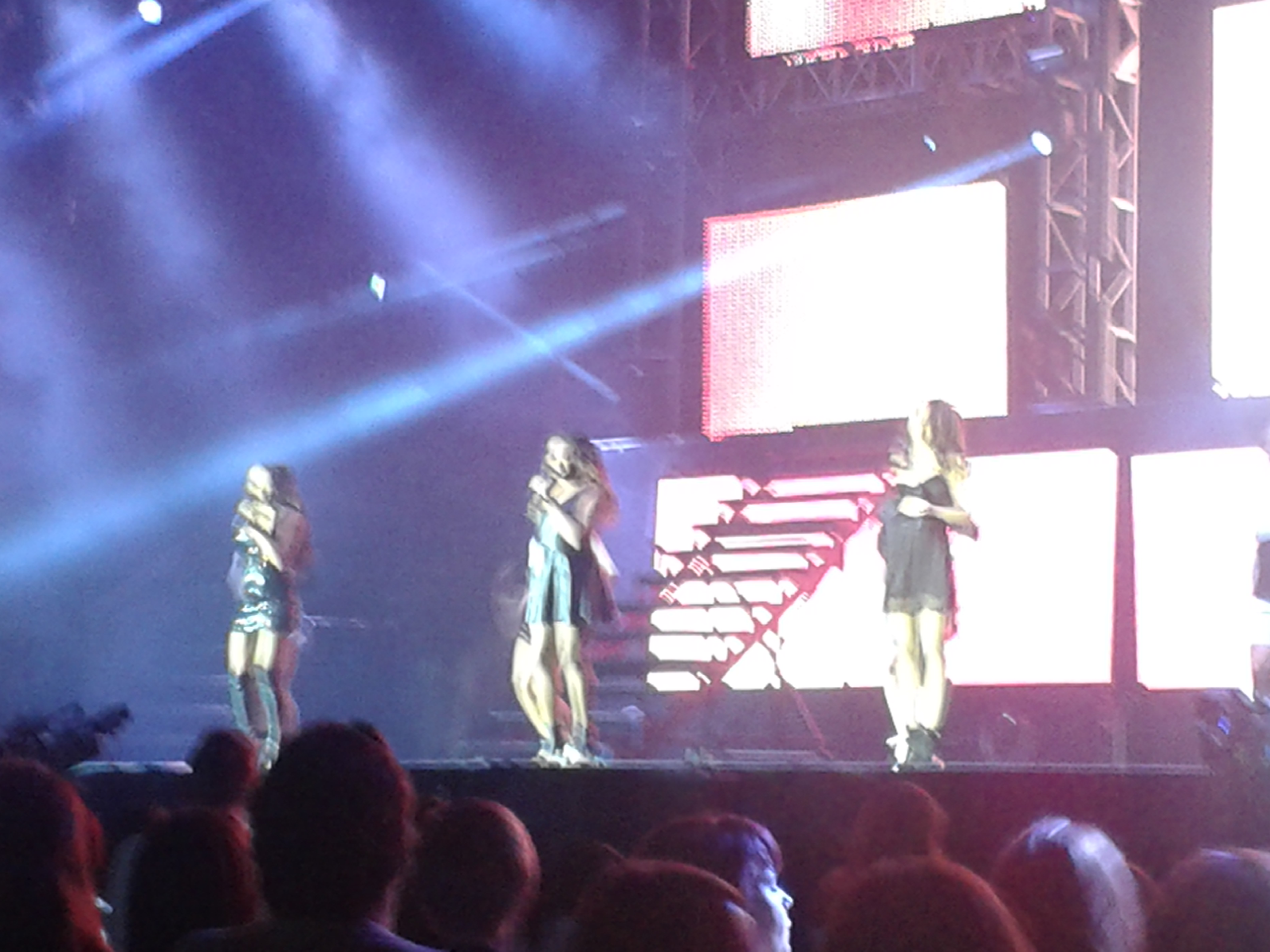
- Honeyz performing in 2013 (L–R): Heavenli Abdi, Celena Cherry and Mariama Goodman

Background information
- Origin: London, England
- Genres: R&B; pop; soul
- Years active: 1997–2003; 2005–2010; 2012–present
- Labels: Mercury; 1st Avenue; Def Jam
- Members: Célena Cherry; Heavenli Abdi, Candice Cherry
- Past members: Naima Belkhiati; Mariama Goodman

Honeyz are a British R&B girl group currently composed of members Célena Cherry, Heavenli Abdi, and Cherry's sister Candace Cherry as a touring member. The group had five UK top-10 hits from 1998 to 2000: "Finally Found" (1998), "End of the Line" (1998), "Love of a Lifetime" (1999), "Never Let You Down" (1999) and "Won't Take It Lying Down" (2000). Their only album, Wonder No.8, was certified gold by the BPI. Honeyz formed in 1997 with the original line-up of Célena Cherry, Heavenli Abdi and Naima Belkhiati. Former Solid Harmonie member Mariama Goodman replaced Abdi from April 1999 until her departure in August 2000, with Abdi rejoining to replace her, before the group disbanded for the first time in 2003.

The original line-up briefly reformed to appear on the ITV show Hit Me, Baby, One More Time in 2005, before the group returned officially in 2006 for a tour. Despite the 2005 appearance, Belkhiati did not want to return because she was focused on an acting career and was replaced by Candace. Abdi left the group for the second time in August 2006 and was once again replaced by Goodman. They performed together on tour until 2010.

Cherry, Abdi and Goodman re-formed for the 2013 ITV 'reality' show The Big Reunion, marking the first time Abdi and Goodman appeared in the same line-up. The show first aired in January 2013 and followed six groups meeting for the first time since they split, and rehearsing for a comeback performance at the Hammersmith Apollo. They went on to perform in the successful 14-date Big Reunion arena tour in May 2013. Abdi once again left the group in 2014 and the group continued to perform gigs as a duo, until Abdi's return in 2023. Goodman quit the group in late 2024 and was replaced by Candace.

== History ==
=== 1997–2000: Formation, Wonder No.8 and Abdi's first departure ===
In 1997, Célena Cherry heard through a friend that First Avenue Management were holding auditions to form a girl group, that friend convinced her to audition for the group. Cherry was selected, and along with Heavenli Abdi, who was already signed to the management company, formed a duo, before signing to Mercury Records under the name Essence. The duo were hailed as an R&B alternative to the Spice Girls and intended as a direct rival to American girl group Destiny's Child. According to Abdi, "We felt that there was a place for a younger, vibey kind of 'pop R&B' group. We were looking at En Vogue as someone that we would like to aspire to." Cherry admitted that Essence was "an okay name, but it wasn't really hitting it". One night, when Abdi and Cherry were departing from the nightclub Subterranea, a man exclaimed at them, "Mm mm, check out those honeys over there!", thus inspiring the group's new name. First Avenue Management soon added a third member to the group, French-born Naima Belkhiati. During the group's reunion in 2013 on The Big Reunion, Abdi remarked her disappointment at Belkhiati joining the group upon discovering that she was not a particularly good singer, as management prioritised looks over Abdi's and Cherry's ambitions of producing a three-part vocal harmony, and cast Cherry as the lead singer.

Their debut single and most popular hit "Finally Found", released in August 1998, peaked at number four in the UK Singles Chart, introducing the trio to the public and selling over 350,000 copies. The follow-up "End of the Line" notched up similar sales figures, peaking at number five. Their debut album Wonder No.8 went gold in the UK with sales of over 200,000 copies. Aside from their success in the United Kingdom, they performed with a full live orchestra in the Netherlands and 8,000 people at ChildLine in Dublin, duetted with Lionel Richie in Italy, and saw their first two singles, "Finally Found" and "End of the Line", go 2× platinum in Australia. In the United States, they signed to Def Jam/Island. The group ended up being featured on the French release of Foxy Brown's single "J.O.B." from her second album Chyna Doll, and they also worked with producer Stevie J (Toni Braxton, Deborah Cox, Puff Daddy).

Between the video shoot for the group's third single "Love of a Lifetime" in New York and their second promotional trip to Australia in March 1999, Belkhiati and Cherry heard that Abdi had decided to quit the group for personal reasons, including newly creative differences with Cherry, homesickness, unhappiness with touring internationally, and wanting to start a solo career and spend more time with her boyfriend, Matthew Marsden. Belkhiati remarked: "Of course, it was a big shock. But we respect her decision, and we wish her a lot of luck in whatever she decides to do." As a result of Adbi's sudden departure, the group lost their US deal with Def Jam, but Abdi's departure opened an opportunity for former Solid HarmoniE vocalist Mariama Goodman to join the group. Her arrival was announced exclusively on BBC One's Live & Kicking on 10 April 1999. The new line-up continued promotion for "Love of a Lifetime" which reached number 9 in the UK charts, and performed over the summer of 1999, at venues including London's Mardi Gras and Capital Radio's Party in the Park concert in Hyde Park in July. At the radio extravaganza, performing in front of 100,000 people, the Honeyz sang their hits "Finally Found" and "End of the Line", before duetting with Another Level on the Help A London Child single "Holding Back the Years". This was followed later in the month by a performance at the 'Wicked Women' concert in Hyde Park, in aid of Breast Cancer Research. In September, the Honeyz supported Five at London's Brixton Academy and Manchester Apollo, in special one-off events organised in conjunction with Cadburys and MTV.

October 1999 saw the release of their fourth single, "Never Let You Down", a new track recorded for inclusion on a repackaged version of Wonder No.8, and the first single to feature Goodman's vocals. The single entered into the UK Singles Chart at number 7, making it a fourth consecutive top 10 hit for the group.

Honeyz performed another newly recorded album track, "Won't Take It Lying Down", at the prestigious MOBO Awards, held on 6 October 1999 in the Royal Albert Hall, where they had picked up two nominations in the 'Best Newcomer' and 'Best R&B Act' categories. "Won't Take It Lying Down" went on to be released at the end of February 2000, reaching number 7. It became the last top 10 single the Honeyz would achieve. At the 2000 Maxim awards, they picked up the award for The Best British Girl Band, beating the Spice Girls, Hepburn, Thunderbugs and Eternal to the title. They were also nominated for Best British Breakthrough Act at the 2000 Brit Awards.

=== 2000–2003: Abdi's return, cancelled album and split ===
By the summer of 2000, a new song had been recorded, which was confirmed as not only the first single to be taken from a planned forthcoming new album but also a chosen single from the Nutty Professor II: The Klumps original soundtrack, with the Honeyz featuring on the UK version alongside Sisqó and Janet Jackson. The single was called "Not Even Gonna Trip" and was initially scheduled for release in late September 2000.

It was during the run-up to the single release, in August, that Goodman announced her departure from Honeyz, due to constant clashing with Belkhiati. As Cherry and Belkhiati were faced with an uncertain future, their management decided to bring Abdi back into the group. During the group's 2013 reunion, it was revealed that this occurred against the wishes of Abdi, Cherry and Belkhiati, and the group was threatened with being dropped by their management if they did not agree to the decision. Abdi's vocals for the new single "Not Even Gonna Trip" was recorded and the official announcement of the renewed line-up was made on ITV's flagship children's programs SMTV Live and CD:UK, on Saturday 19 August 2000, along with a performance of "Finally Found", poignant in that it was the first-ever performance by a band on CD:UK on its launch almost two years earlier to the day, on 20 August 1998. "Not Even Gonna Trip" failed to reach the top 20 by the time it was released in late October, peaking at number 24. After this, the group worked hard on their second album, Harmony.

Almost a year after Abdi's return, the group released a new single "I Don't Know" on 5 August 2001, but with minimal exposure and promotion, the track did not chart as high as their previous single, stalling at number 28.

The group released another single – a song titled "Talk to the Hand" – in November 2001. A video was filmed and was played on major channels such as MTV Hits. However, Mercury decided to simply drop the group, canceling the release of Harmony as a result. Following this and a departure from their management, the group would perform independently until splitting in late 2003.

=== 2005–2010: First reunion ===
In January 2005, the original line-up made a special appearance on the ITV singing contest Hit Me, Baby, One More Time, performing their debut single "Finally Found" and a cover of Nickelback's hit "How You Remind Me". The group returned officially in 2006 for a tour. Despite the appearance in 2005, Belkhiati did not want to return because she was focused on an acting career and was replaced by Cherry's sister, Candace. Abdi left the band for the second time in August 2006 and was once again replaced by Goodman. They performed together on tour until 2010.

=== 2012–2015: Second reunion ===
Despite Cherry insisting there was "zero" chance of Honeyz ever getting back together, it was confirmed in October 2012 that Honeyz, along with Atomic Kitten, Liberty X, B*Witched, Five and 911, would be reuniting for the ITV2 reality-documentary series The Big Reunion on ITV2 at some time in 2013. Although Belkhiati was in the original line-up and was with the group throughout their musical career, she decided not to take part in the re-formation in order to focus on her solo career, so Cherry contacted both Abdi and Goodman via management to form a new line-up with them, marking the first time both women would work together in the same line-up. The series, which began airing on 31 January 2013, followed the groups rehearsing for two weeks ahead of one major comeback performance at the London Hammersmith Apollo on 26 February 2013.

In the Honeyz episode, on 14 February 2013, Cherry, Abdi and Goodman discussed their time in the group and the reasons for the line-up changes. The episode ended with an emotional reunion between Abdi and Cherry, who had not spoken together since Abdi left the group for the second time in 2006. However, elements of The Big Reunion were largely scripted for dramatic effect, and on 16 February 2013 Abdi herself discussed the way the Honeyz storylines were portrayed on the show on her Twitter page: "Adaptations of the truth... some actual, some factual, others spun into villain/victim stories for TV drama! #BigReunion amusing!"

The bands were originally only supposed to perform a one-off concert at London's Hammersmith Apollo on 26 February 2013, but, when the entire show sold out in under five minutes shortly after the premiere of the first episode on 31 January 2013, rumours circulated that show producers were planning to tour the concert around the UK. On 11 February, it was confirmed that due to high demands for tickets and the popularity of the show, a full 12-date tour around the country would be taking place from 3–12 May 2013. Two further dates in Ireland and Northern Ireland were later added as well. On 27 March 2013 it was announced that the bands would perform a mini Christmas tour in December 2013.

Following an interview with The Vault in March 2013, the group confirmed that they were planning to record new material in the near future. During the arena tour, Honeyz revealed a new song, "Price You Pay", which they say they hope to release in Autumn 2013.

On 16 September 2013 Honeyz attended the 2013 National Reality Television Awards, where The Big Reunion was up for several awards. On 7 February 2014, they posted on their Facebook page that they were "Putting pen to paper and writing some great songs..." On 31 July the group announced that Abdi decided to quit the band for the third time, leaving Cherry and Goodman to continue as a duo.

On 20 November 2015, Honeyz released "Definitely Something", their first single in 14 years and first release as a duo.

=== 2018–present: TV appearances ===
In 2018, Cherry auditioned for the twelfth series of Britain's Got Talent with her husband Danny: their audition was shown on spin-off show Britain's Got More Talent. Judge Alesha Dixon, who was a member of fellow girl group Mis-Teeq, recognised her. Asked by Simon Cowell to tell the judges about themselves, Cherry said: "I used to be in a girl group called the Honeyz", implying that the group had disbanded. However, in summer 2018, Cherry and Goodman resumed performing at UK gigs as Honeyz.

In January 2022, the duo appeared on series 7 of E4's Celebrity Coach Trip, joining fellow celebrity travellers in Portugal like Matt Richardson, Honey G, Paul Danan, Ginny Lemon and Birds of a Feather stars Linda Robson and Lesley Joseph. The duo were the first couple to be voted off the coach, receiving the red card and leaving in episode 5 after spending the day in Porto and Figueira da Foz.

On 3 September 2022, the duo appeared as a team on BBC's quiz show Pointless Celebrities, competing against other teams composed of fellow celebrity musicians.

On 17 August 2023, former member Abdi announced that she had rejoined the group ahead of the group's 25th anniversary via her personal Instagram account. On 24 August 2023, when asked during an Instagram live stream about why former member Belkhiati did not rejoin the group for the 25th anniversary, Cherry explained that she had unsuccessfully asked Belkhiati to rejoin the group many times, but said that the door would always be open for her to rejoin.

In October 2024, the group began performing gigs as a trio consisting of Abdi, Cherry, and Cherry's sister, Candace. Abdi stated that Goodman had chosen to quit the group due to personal reasons, though said that the door would also be open for her to rejoin.

On 30 July 2026, Cherry announced that the group's new single "Butterflies", their first song to contain vocals from Candace, would be released on 3 August.

== Members ==
=== Current members ===
- Célena Cherry (1998–2003, 2005–2010, 2012–present)
- Heavenli Abdi (1998–1999, 2000–2003, 2005–2006, 2012–2014, 2023–present)

=== Past members ===
- Naima Belkhiati (1998–2003, 2005)
- Mariama Goodman (1999–2000, 2006–2010, 2012–2024)

=== Touring members ===
- Candace Cherry (2006–2010, 2024–present)

== Discography ==
Studio albums

- Wonder No.8 (1998)

== Tours ==
Co-headlining

- Smash Hits Tour (with various artists) (2000)
- The Big Reunion Tour (with The Big Reunion cast) (2013)
- 90s Pop Baby Tour (with various artists) (2022)
