= Célena Cherry =

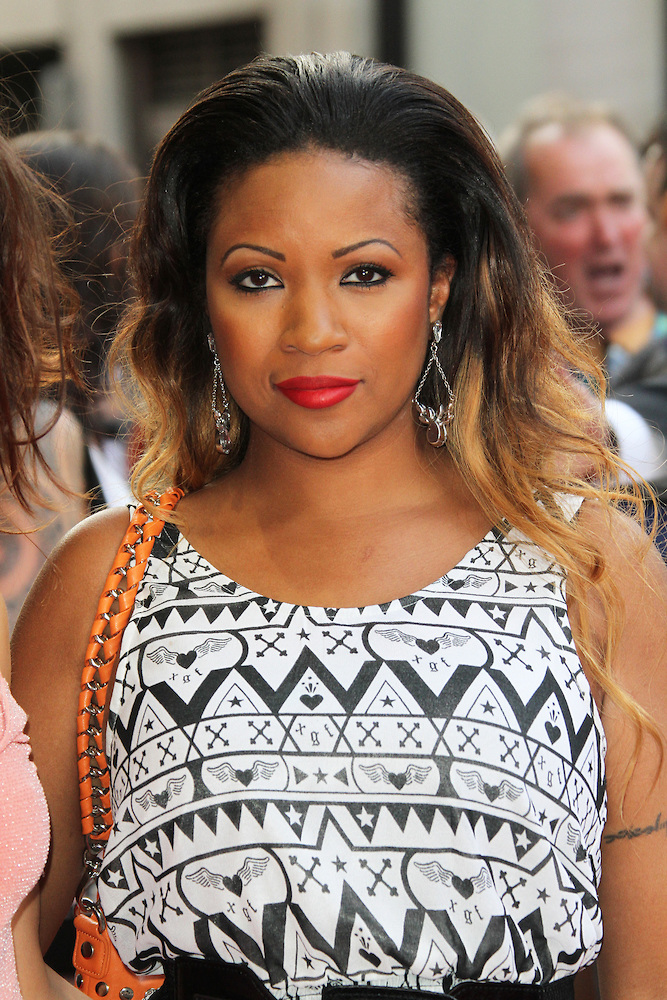
- Cherry at the premiere of Bula Quo! in 2013

Background information
- Born: Célena Francine Alexandra Cherry; 26 April 1977 (age 49); Hammersmith, London, England
- Genres: R&B; soul
- Occupations: Singer; songwriter
- Years active: 1995–present
- Labels: 1st Avenue; Mercury; Def Jam
- Member of: Honeyz

Célena Francine Alexandra Cherry (born 26 April 1977) is a British singer and songwriter. She is the lead singer of the girl group Honeyz.

== Early life and career ==
Cherry was born to parents from Grenada and St Lucia. Originally intending to become an actress, she attended Corona Theatre School in Kew, London between the ages of 4 and 16.

Before forming Honeyz, she was in another girl group called Illusion.

== Solo career ==
After the failure of the second Honeyz album, Cherry teamed up with her cousin Alani (former Kleshay singer) under the name Anotherside. They released one single together, "This Is Your Night", through V2 Records.

In 2005, Cherry released her first solo album, Celena Cherry, through her official website. This exclusive limited edition CD featured new interpretations of some of her Honeyz hits, plus some new material and personal favourites along with a selection of festive songs.

Cherry has also pursued an acting career, appearing in the soap operas Hollyoaks and Doctors. In an interview with Just Celebrity Magazine, she said she would love to get back into acting. Celena also attended the launch of a new stage school in Harpenden on Friday 13 September 2013 (part of Top Hat Stage & Screen School).

According to Cherry's official website, Honeyz are currently recording a new album as a group. She is at the same time working on her second solo album. Three songs, "Gave You My Love", "Tell Me Why" and "Conscience Calling", are on her Myspace page.

She has provided showbiz gossip for UK TV channel GB News.

== Personal life ==
Cherry has two children, Sienna and Michael. In 2018, Cherry and her husband auditioned for the twelfth series of Britain's Got Talent; the audition was shown on spin-off show Britain's Got More Talent.

== Discography ==
=== Albums ===
Year	Title	UK	Comment
2005	Celena Cherry	–	Self-released
2008	Devil in Disguise	–	Shelved

=== Singles ===
Year	Title	UK
2003	"This Is Your Night"	41
