= Sister Sledge discography =

This discography documents albums and singles released by American vocal group Sister Sledge.

== Albums ==
=== Studio albums ===
Year	Album	Peak chart positions							Certifications	Record label
Year	Album	US	US R&B	AUS	CAN	NLD	NZ	UK	Certifications	Record label
1975	Circle of Love	—	56	—	—	—	—	—		Atco
1977	Together	—	—	—	—	—	—	—		Cotillion
1979	We Are Family	3	1	37	4	33	45	7	RIAA: Platinum; BPI: Gold	Cotillion
1980	Love Somebody Today	31	7	—	—	—	—	—		Cotillion
1981	All American Girls	42	13	—	—	31	—	—		Cotillion
1982	The Sisters	69	17	—	—	—	—	—		Cotillion
1983	Bet Cha Say That to All the Girls	169	35	—	—	—	—	—		Cotillion
1985	When the Boys Meet the Girls	—	52	—	—	—	34	19	BPI: Silver	Atlantic
1998	African Eyes	—	—	—	—	—	—	—		Fahrenheit
2003	Style	—	—	—	—	—	—	—		Empowerment
"—" denotes a recording that did not chart or was not released in that territory.

=== Compilation albums ===
==== Charting compilations ====
Year	Album	Peak chart positions		Certifications	Record label
Year	Album	NLD	UK	Certifications	Record label
1987	Freak Out: The Greatest Hits of Chic and Sister Sledge	—	72		Atlantic
1992	And Now...Sledge...Again	73	—		Arcade
1993	The Very Best of Sister Sledge 1973–93	—	19	BPI: Gold	Rhino
"—" denotes a recording that did not chart or was not released in that territory.

==== Additional compilations ====
- The Best of Sister Sledge (1973–1985) (1992, Rhino)
- The Very Best of Chic & Sister Sledge (1999, WEA Int'l)
- The Essentials (2002, Rhino)
- Good Times: The Very Best of the Hits & the Remixes (with Chic) (2005, WEA Int'l)
- The Definitive Groove Collection (2006, Rhino)
- Original Album Series (2011, Rhino)
- We Are Family: The Essential (2012, Music Club)
- An Introduction to Sister Sledge (2018, Rhino)
- Thinking Of You: The Atco/Cotillon/Atlantic Recordings 1973-1985 (2020, Soulmusic)

== Singles ==
Year	Single	Peak chart positions										Certifications	Album
Year	Single	US	US R&B	US Dan	US A/C	AUS	CAN	IRE	NLD	NZ	UK	Certifications	Album
1971	"Time Will Tell"	—	—	—	—	—	—	—	—	—	—		—N/a
1973	"The Weatherman"	—	—	—	—	—	—	—	—	—	—		—N/a
1973	"Mama Never Told Me"	—	—	—	—	—	—	—	—	—	20		—N/a
1974	"Love Don't You Go Through No Changes on Me"	92	31	5	—	—	—	—	—	—	—		Circle of Love
1975	"Protect Our Love"	—	—	7	—	—	—	—	—	—	—		Circle of Love
1975	"Pain Reliever"	—	—	7	—	—	—	—	—	—	—		Circle of Love
1975	"Circle of Love (Caught in the Middle)"	—	—	—	—	—	—	—	—	—	—		Circle of Love
1975	"Love Has Found Me"	—	—	—	—	—	—	—	—	—	—		—N/a
1976	"Thank You for Today"	—	78	—	—	—	—	—	—	—	—		—N/a
1977	"Cream of the Crop"	—	100	—	—	—	—	—	—	—	—		—N/a
1977	"Blockbuster Boy"	—	61	—	—	—	—	—	—	—	—		Together
1977	"Baby, It's the Rain"	—	—	—	—	—	—	—	—	—	—		Together
1978	"I've Seen Better Days"	—	—	—	—	—	—	—	—	—	—		—N/a
1979	"He's the Greatest Dancer"	9	1	1	—	22	6	20	18	17	6	BPI: Gold	We Are Family
1979	"We Are Family"	2	1	1	30	19	1	20	16	6	8	RIAA: Platinum; BPI: Platinum	We Are Family
1979	"Lost in Music"	—	35	1	—	—	—	30	12	—	17		We Are Family
1979	"Got to Love Somebody"	64	6	34	—	—	—	—	31	—	34		Love Somebody Today
1980	"Reach Your Peak"	101	21	34	—	—	—	—	—	—	—		Love Somebody Today
1980	"Let's Go on Vacation"	—	63	—	—	—	—	—	—	—	—		Love Somebody Today
1980	"Easy Street"	—	—	—	—	—	—	—	—	—	—		Love Somebody Today
1981	"All American Girls"	79	3	6	—	—	—	—	8	—	41		All American Girls
1981	"He's Just a Runaway (A Tribute to Bob Marley)"	—	32	6	—	—	—	—	9	—	—		All American Girls
1981	"Next Time You'll Know"	82	28	—	—	—	—	—	—	—	—		All American Girls
1982	"My Guy"	23	14	—	2	50	—	—	—	5	—		The Sisters
1982	"All the Man I Need"	—	45	—	—	—	—	—	—	—	—		The Sisters
1983	"B.Y.O.B. (Bring Your Own Baby)"	—	22	—	—	—	—	—	—	—	—		Bet Cha Say That to All the Girls
1983	"Gotta Get Back to Love"	—	56	—	—	—	—	—	—	—	—		Bet Cha Say That to All the Girls
1984	"Thinking of You"	—	—	—	—	—	—	20	—	—	11	BPI: Gold	We Are Family
1984	"Lost in Music" (1984 Remix by Nile Rodgers)	—	—	—	—	—	—	6	4	—	4	BPI: Gold	—N/a
1984	"We Are Family" (1984 Remix by Bernard Edwards)	—	—	—	—	—	—	27	25	—	33		—N/a
1985	"Frankie"	75	32	—	15	10	—	1	10	3	1	BPI: Gold	When the Boys Meet the Girls
1985	"Dancing on the Jagged Edge"	—	71	—	—	—	—	22	—	—	50		When the Boys Meet the Girls
1985	"You're Fine"	—	—	—	—	—	—	—	—	—	—		When the Boys Meet the Girls
1986	"When the Boys Meet the Girls"	—	—	—	—	—	—	—	—	—	89		When the Boys Meet the Girls
1986	"Here to Stay (Anthem from Playing for Keeps)"	—	—	—	—	—	—	—	—	—	78		Playing for Keeps
1993	"We Are Family" (Sure Is Pure Remix)	—	—	31	—	—	—	6	—	—	5		The Very Best of Sister Sledge 1973–93
1993	"Lost in Music" (Sure Is Pure Remix)	—	—	—	—	—	—	10	—	—	14		The Very Best of Sister Sledge 1973–93
1993	"Thinking of You" (RAMP Radio Mix)	—	—	—	—	88	—	21	—	—	17		—N/a
2004	"We Are Family" (re-release)	—	—	—	—	—	—	—	—	—	93		—N/a
"—" denotes a recording that did not chart or was not released in that territory.
