= Kim Sledge =

American singer (born 1957)

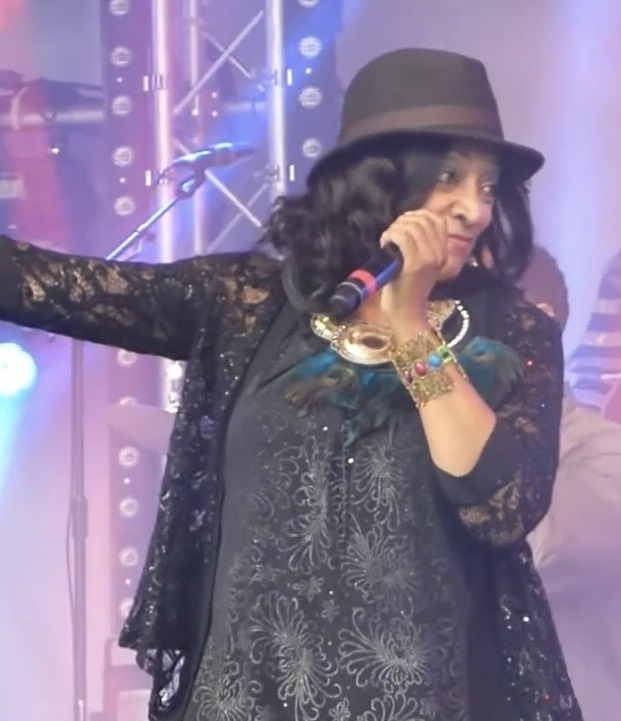
- Kim Sledge performing in 2017
- Born: Kim Yvonne Sledge; August 21, 1957 (age 69); Philadelphia, Pennsylvania, U.S.
- Education: Temple University
- Occupations: Singer; songwriter; music producer; minister
- Years active: 1965–present
- Spouses: Bernard Hopewell (m. 1979; div. 1982) Mark D. Allen (m. 1984)
- Children: 3
- Relatives: Debbie Sledge (sister); Joni Sledge (sister); Kathy Sledge (sister)
- Musical career
- Genres: Gospel; R&B; disco; pop; soul
- Instrument: Vocals
- Labels: Malaju; Atco; Cotillion; Atlantic

Kim Sledge (born August 21, 1957) is an American singer–songwriter, music producer, and evangelist. She rose to fame in the 1970s as a member of Sister Sledge, one of the highest-selling female groups of the 1970s.

In 2000, she departed from the group to focus on her ministry. In 2002, she released a gospel album Peaceful, on her own record label Malaju Records. She obtained her ministry license from International Fellowship of Christian Ministries in 2003 and further pursued her evangelism. In 2011, she rejoined Sister Sledge for an international tour lasting to early 2012. She rejoined the group again in 2015 and left in 2019.

== Early life ==
Kim Yvonne Sledge was born in Philadelphia, Pennsylvania, on August 21, 1957. Her mother, Florez Sledge (née Williams), was an actress, while her father, Edwin Edgar Sledge, was a Broadway performer and member of tap dance duo Fred and Sledge. Her sisters Carol, Debbie, Joni, and Kathy, are also singers. Her maternal grandmother, Viola Williams, was an opera singer.

Kim attended Olney High School and graduated in 1975. She later attended Temple University, majoring in Pan African studies and economics.

== History ==
=== 1965–2000: Sister Sledge ===
In 1965, Sledge formed the female group The Sledge Sisters; alongside her sisters Debbie Sledge, Joni Sledge, and Kathy Sledge. The group performed in local clubs. In 1971, they debuted as Sisters Sledge, releasing their first single "Time Will Tell" on New York City-based record label Money Back Records. In 1973, they began performing as Sister Sledge and signed with Atco Records, a subsidiary of Atlantic Records. They released two singles, "The Weatherman" and "Mama Never Told Me", the latter of which had minor success on the UK singles chart. In 1975, Sister Sledge released their debut album Circle of Love, which peaked at number 56 on Billboard's Soul LP's chart. In mid-1970s, Atco Records began focusing more on hard rock acts and some British and European bands. As a result, Sister Sledge changed label rosters to Cotillion Records, another subsidiary of Atlantic Records.

Sister Sledge released their second album Together in 1977, which spawned a minor hit song "Blockbuster Boy". After the album's commercial failure, Cotillion Records paired the group with music producers Nile Rodgers and Bernard Edwards of disco group Chic. The group's third album, We Are Family, was released in January 1979 and peaked number three on the US Billboard 200, later achieving platinum status in the country. The record spawned the singles "He's the Greatest Dancer", "We Are Family", and "Lost in Music"; the former two topped the US Hot Soul Singles chart and charted within the top ten on the Billboard Hot 100. "We Are Family" received a nomination for Best R&B Performance by a Duo or Group with Vocals at the 1980 Grammy Awards. Sister Sledge went on to release four more albums on Cotillion Records: Love Somebody Today (1980), All American Girls (1981), The Sisters (1982), and Bet Cha Say That to All the Girls (1983).

In 1985, Cotillion Records became a defunct and Sister Sledge moved its parent label roster Atlantic Records. They released an album When the Boys Meet the Girls, which experienced mainstream success in the United Kingdom. Following the release of their greatest hits compilation Freak Out: The Greatest Hits of Chic and Sister Sledge in 1987, Sister Sledge took a hiatus. Following Kathy's departure, Kim took on the role of performing her parts in concerts. In 1998, Sister Sledge released their ninth album African Eyes, on which Kim sang lead on three songs.

=== 2000–2003: Solo career and evangelism ===
In early 2000, Kim departed from the group to focus on becoming an ordained minister. In December 2000, she performed alongside the group at the White House for the President and First Lady at the final Christmas party of the Clinton administration. In the aftermath of September 11 attacks, she took part in the re-recording of "We Are Family" alongside other popular singers and musicians at the request of Tommy Boy Records president Tom Silverman. She also appeared in the accompanying documentary The Making and Meaning of We Are Family. In November 2001, she also performed with the group at the Denim and Diamonds Gala at Planet Hollywood benefiting the G&P Foundation for Cancer Research.

In 2002, Sledge released her debut album Peaceful on her independent record label Malaju Records. In February 2003, Sledge reunited with Sister Sledge and performed "We Are Family" during the halftime of the game between the Los Angeles Clippers and the New York Knicks at Madison Square Garden on in New York City. The group released an album titled Style in 2003; which featured all of the original members, although the album only received a limited-edition release. She later departed from the group again to continue focusing on her evangelism and was replaced by her niece Camille Sledge.

=== 2011–2019: Return to Sister Sledge ===
In April 2011, Kim rejoined the group for a televised performance of "We Are Family" on The Oprah Winfrey Show. In late 2011, she co-founded the Paradise Project. In January 2012, Sledge and the Paradise Project performed at the gospel concert called "Glory Light - Fire Life" in Lower Makefield Township, Pennsylvania. She also continued to tour with Sister Sledge until mid-2012. In 2015, she re-joined Sister Sledge and continued performing alongside Debbie until the spring of 2019. In late 2019, she joined Kathy's version of Sister Sledge; performing alongside Kathy, her daughter Kristen Gabrielle, and Kim's daughter Julie Sledge.

=== 2020–present: Recent activities ===
In November 2020, Sledge released her own version of "We Are Family".. In January 2021, she performed at the Bucks County Playhouse for a holiday concert called Kim Sledge: Home for the Holidays. In April 2022, she released a children's book titled Jul & Dre.

== Personal life ==
In May 1979, Kim married Pennsylvania-native Bernard Hopewell, a then-executive director of Chester, Pennsylvania YMCA. The wedding was officiated by singer Teddy Pendergrass. The couple divorced in the early 1980s. In mid-1980s, she remarried to Mark D. Allen, an orthopedic surgeon. Together, they have three children: Mark Allen, Laura Allen, and Julie Allen (sometimes referred to as Julie Sledge). In 2003, Sledge obtained her credentials as an ordained minister from International Fellowship of Christian Ministries.

In October 2010, Kim contracted the H1N1 virus. Four months later while being treated for the virus, she contracted pneumonia and was admitted to intensive care unit in February 2011. She later contracted coccidioidomycosis. Sledge attributes her recovery to her Christian faith.

== Discography ==
Albums

- Peace (2002)

== Books ==
- Jul & Dre (2022)
