= Debbie Sledge =

American singer (born 1954)

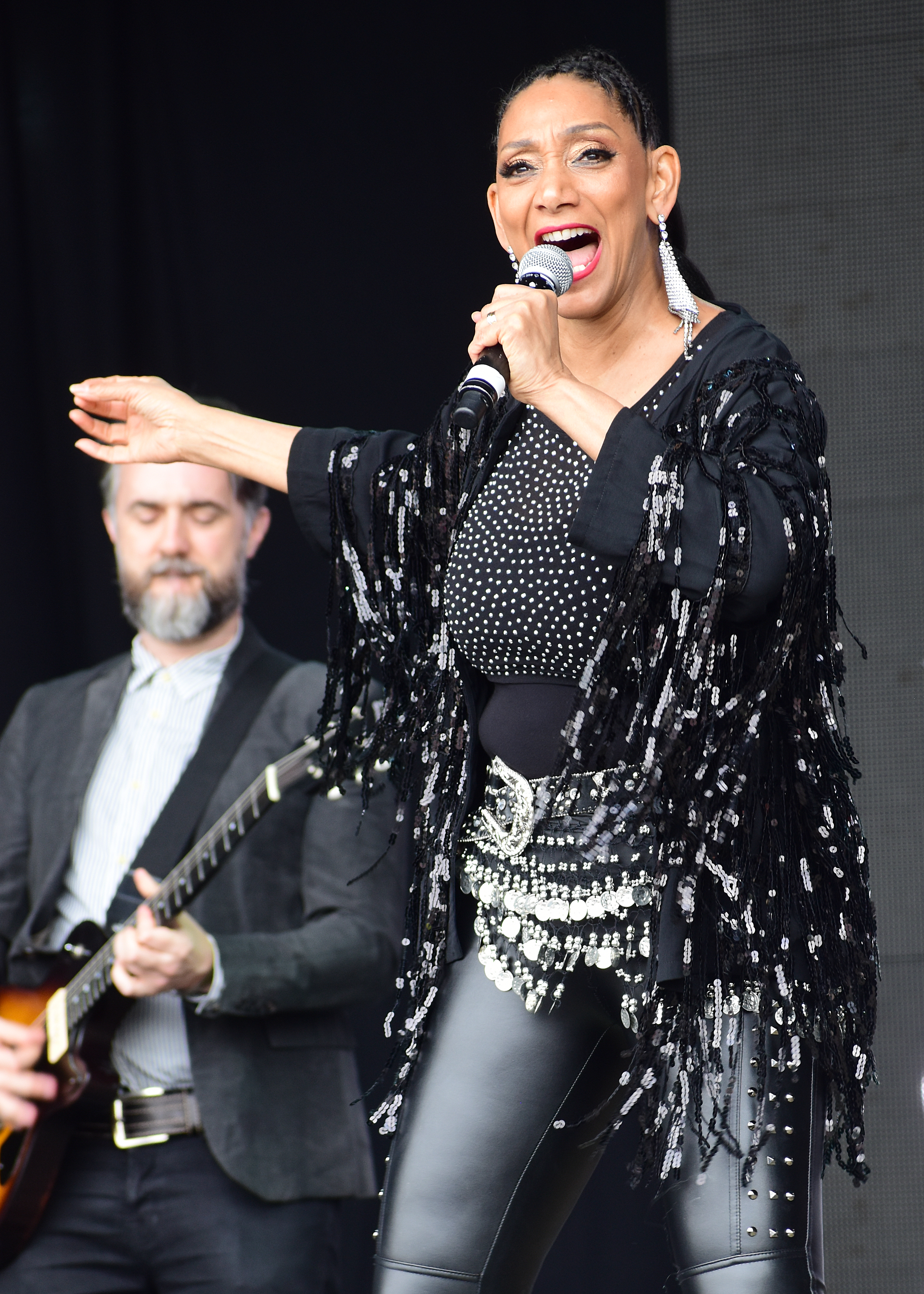
- Sledge performing in July 2021
- Born: Debra Edwina Sledge; July 9, 1954 (age 72); Philadelphia, Pennsylvania, U.S.
- Other name: Debbie Sledge-Young
- Education: Temple University
- Occupations: Singer; songwriter
- Years active: 1965–present
- Spouses: Bernard Young (m. 1977–?); divorced; Jeroen Debruine (m. 1993)
- Children: 6
- Relatives: Joni Sledge (sister); Kim Sledge (sister); Kathy Sledge (sister)
- Musical career
- Genres: Jazz; R&B; disco; soul
- Instrument: Vocals
- Labels: Atco; Cotillion; Atlantic
- Website: www.debbiesledge.com

Debra Edwina Sledge (born July 9, 1954), known professionally as Debbie Sledge, is an American singer–songwriter. She rose to fame in the 1970s as a member of Sister Sledge, one of the highest-selling female groups of the 1970s. In 2021, she formed a spinoff called Sister Sledge featuring Sledgendary.

== Career ==
=== 1965–2013: Sister Sledge ===
In 1965, Sledge formed the female group The Sledge Sisters; alongside her younger sisters Joni Sledge, Kim Sledge, and Kathy Sledge. The group performed in local clubs. In 1971, they debuted as Sisters Sledge, releasing their first single "Time Will Tell" on New York City-based record label Money Back Records. In 1973, they began performing as Sister Sledge and signed with Atco Records, a subsidiary of Atlantic Records. They released two singles, "The Weatherman" and "Mama Never Told Me", the latter of which had minor success on the UK singles chart. In 1975, Sister Sledge released their debut album Circle of Love, which peaked at number 56 on Billboard's Soul LP's chart. In mid-1970s, Atco Records began focusing more on hard rock acts and some British and European bands. As a result, Sister Sledge changed label rosters to Cotillion Records, another subsidiary of Atlantic Records.

Sister Sledge released their second album Together in 1977, which spawned a minor hit song "Blockbuster Boy". After the album's commercial failure, Cotillion Records paired the group with music producers Nile Rodgers and Bernard Edwards of disco group Chic. The group's third album, We Are Family, was released in January 1979 and peaked number three on the US Billboard 200, later achieving platinum status in the country. The record spawned the singles "He's the Greatest Dancer", "We Are Family", and "Lost in Music"; the former two topped the US Hot Soul Singles chart and charted within the top ten on the Billboard Hot 100. "We Are Family" received a nomination for Best R&B Performance by a Duo or Group with Vocals at the 1980 Grammy Awards. Sister Sledge went on to release four more albums on Cotillion Records: Love Somebody Today (1980), All American Girls (1981), The Sisters (1982), and Bet Cha Say That to All the Girls (1983).

In 1985, Cotillion Records became defunct and Sister Sledge moved to its parent label Atlantic Records. They released an album When the Boys Meet the Girls, which experienced mainstream success in the United Kingdom. Following the release of their greatest hits compilation Freak Out: The Greatest Hits of Chic and Sister Sledge in 1987, Sister Sledge took a hiatus. Sledge remained with the group as they continued releasing albums including And Now...Sledge...Again (1992), African Eyes (1998), and Style (2003). Over the next decade, she continued to tour with Sister Sledge alongside Joni Sledge.

=== 2014–present: Solo projects and Sister Sledge featuring Sledgendary ===
In 2014, Sledge released her debut solo album Unsung. Despite having her solo performances, she continued touring and performing with Sister Sledge. In 2016, she released a live jazz album Debbie Sledge w/ the Niels Lan Doky Trio – Live at The Standard. In 2019, she released a single titled "Never Change". In July 2020, she released her second live album Sledge Sings Simone, a tribute album to American singer Nina Simone. By 2021, Kim Sledge had left Sister Sledge, leaving Debbie Sledge as the only original member of the group. She later rebranded her lineup as Sister Sledge featuring Sledgendary; a group consisting of her, and two of her children Camille Young and David Young, Joni Sledge's son Thaddeus Sledge (born Thaddeus Whyte IV), and Tanya Ti-et.

== Personal life ==
In the 1970s, she married Bernard Young, an art professor from Kentucky. She has a total of six children; including: Amber Young (often credited as Amber Sledge), Camille Young (often credited as Camille Sledge), and David Young (often credited as David Sledge). They later divorced and she remarried to a man named Jeroen Debruine.

== Discography ==
Albums

- Unsung (2014)
- Debbie Sledge w/ the Niels Lan Doky Trio – Live at The Standard (2016)
- Sledge Sings Simone (2020)
