= Joni Sledge =

American singer (1956–2017)

- Sledge, 1979.
- Born: Joan Elise Sledge; September 13, 1956; Philadelphia, Pennsylvania, U.S.
- Died: March 10, 2017 (aged 60); Phoenix, Arizona, U.S.
- Resting place: Ivy Hill Cemetery; Philadelphia, Pennsylvania, U.S.
- Education: Temple University
- Occupations: Singer; songwriter; producer
- Years active: 1965–2016
- Spouse: Thaddeus E. Whyte III (m. 1992; div. 2000)
- Children: 1
- Relatives: Debbie Sledge (sister); Kim Sledge (sister); Kathy Sledge (sister)
- Musical career
- Genres: R&B; disco; pop; soul
- Instrument: Vocals
- Labels: Atco; Cotillion; Atlantic

Joan Elise Sledge (September 13, 1956 – March 10, 2017), known professionally as Joni Sledge was an American singer–songwriter and music producer. She rose to fame in the 1970s as a member of the family vocal group Sister Sledge, one of the highest-selling female groups of the 1970s. Sledge sang lead on their US Top 10 songs "Lost in Music" and "Reach Your Peak". In 1984, a remix of "Lost in Music" peaked at number 4 on the UK Singles chart and also earned a silver-certification by the British Phonographic Industry (BPI). She co-wrote and co-produced Sister Sledge's ninth album African Eyes (1998). Sledge continued to tour and perform with the group throughout the years. Her final performance with Sister Sledge was in October 2016.

== Early life ==
Joan Elise Sledge was born the third of five daughters in Philadelphia, Pennsylvania, to Edwin Sledge, a tap dancer, and his actress wife, Florez (née Williams). Described as a warm extrovert, Sledge attended Olney High School, graduating in 1974. Sledge majored in communications while in college and began acting in school productions at Temple University. During her sophomore year at Temple, she directed her first stage-play "Wild Flower", written by Hazel Bright and produced by Ron Alexander.

== History ==
In 1965, Sledge formed the female group The Sledge Sisters; alongside her sisters Debbie Sledge, Kim Sledge, and Kathy Sledge. The group performed in local clubs. In 1971, they debuted as Sisters Sledge, releasing their first single "Time Will Tell" on New York City-based record label Money Back Records. In 1973, they began performing as Sister Sledge and signed with Atco Records, a subsidiary of Atlantic Records. They released two singles, "The Weatherman" and "Mama Never Told Me", the latter of which had minor success on the UK singles chart. In 1975, Sister Sledge released their debut album Circle of Love, which peaked at number 56 on Billboard's Soul LP's chart. In mid-1970s, Atco Records began focusing more on hard rock acts and some British and European bands. As a result, Sister Sledge changed label rosters to Cotillion Records, another subsidiary of Atlantic Records.

Sister Sledge released their second album Together in 1977, which spawned a minor hit song "Blockbuster Boy". After the album's commercial failure, Cotillion Records paired the group with music producers Nile Rodgers and Bernard Edwards of disco group Chic. The group's third album, We Are Family, was released in January 1979 and peaked number three on the US Billboard 200, later achieving platinum status in the country. The record spawned the singles "He's the Greatest Dancer", "We Are Family", and "Lost in Music"; the latter of which Sledge sang lead vocals on and peaked at number 17 on the UK Singles chart. "We Are Family" received a nomination for Best R&B Performance by a Duo or Group with Vocals at the 1980 Grammy Awards. The group followed up with another disco album titled Love Somebody Today (1980). Sledge sang lead on the album's second single "Reach Your Peak", which peaked at number 21 on the US Hot Soul Singles chart. Sister Sledge went on to release three more albums on Cotillion Records: All American Girls (1981), The Sisters (1982), and Bet Cha Say That to All the Girls (1983).

In 1985, Cotillion Records became a defunct and Sister Sledge moved its parent label roster Atlantic Records. They released an album When the Boys Meet the Girls, which experienced mainstream success in the United Kingdom. Following the release of their greatest hits compilation Freak Out: The Greatest Hits of Chic and Sister Sledge in 1987, Sister Sledge took a hiatus. After Kathy left the group 1989, Joni began alternating lead vocals with Kim. During the recording of African Eyes (1998), she took an more active role in the album's production, as she wrote and sang lead on most of the songs on the album.

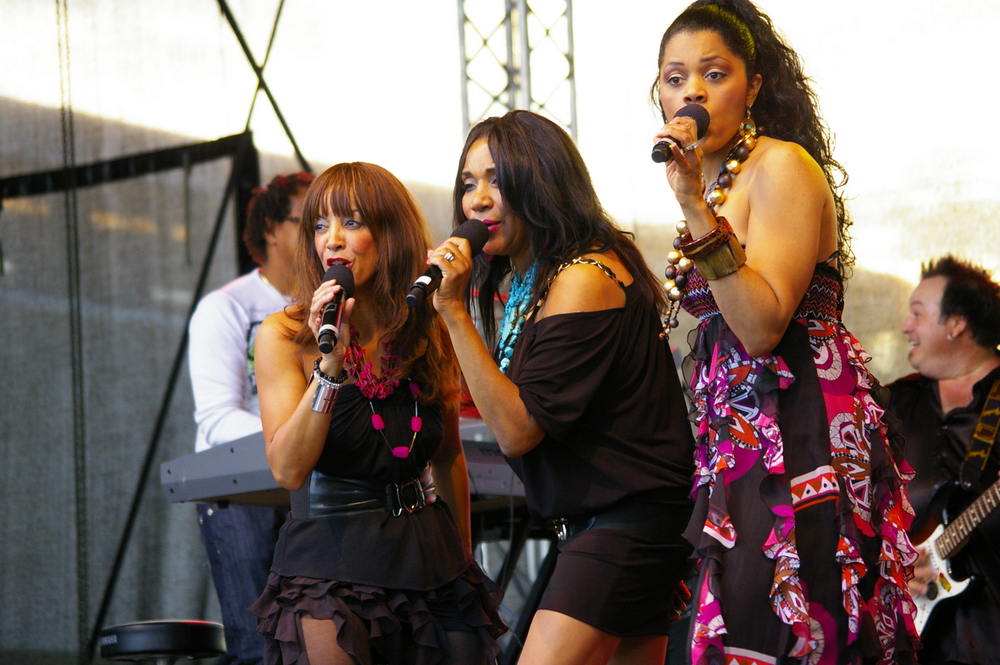
Chele' Davis, Joni Sledge (middle), and Amber Sledge performing in Vienna, Austria, 2008.

In December 2000, all four members performed at the White House for the President and First Lady at the final Christmas party of the Clinton administration. In the aftermath of September 11 attacks, Sister Sledge re-recorded "We Are Family" alongside other popular singers and musicians at the request of Tommy Boy Records president Tom Silverman. They also appeared in the accompanied documentary The Making and Meaning of We Are Family. In November 2001, they performed at the Denim and Diamonds Gala at Planet Hollywood benefiting the G&P Foundation for Cancer Research. In February 2003, the original members performed "We Are Family" during the halftime of the game between the Los Angeles Clippers and the New York Knicks at Madison Square Garden on in New York City. The group released an album titled Style in 2003; which featured all of the original members, although the album only received a limited-edition release. In mid-2003, Debbie and Joni began touring as the lineup of Sister Sledge, often adding Debbie's younger daughter Camille Young (credited as Camille Sledge) as the third member in place of Kim. By 2008, a lineup of Joni Sledge, Amber Sledge, and family friend Chele' Davis (replacing Debbie) began touring as Sister Sledge, with Debbie Sledge periodically performing in the lineup.

In 2009, she released her solo album Joni (also called Tru), exclusively available as a digital download through her website. In April 2011, she performed alongside Debbie, Kim, and Kathy for a televised performance of "We Are Family" on The Oprah Winfrey Show. Sledge continued to tour with the group until 2016. In 2016, although a formal statement was not released, Sledge was said to be in failing health. She continued to make special appearances with the group involving television, galas, and certain festival performances but ultimately refrained from extensively touring with Sister Sledge, leaving the group's longtime collaborator Tanya Ti-et to fill in for her.

== Death ==
On March 11, 2017, Sledge was found dead by a friend at her home in Phoenix, Arizona, aged 60. Her death was originally attributed to unknown circumstances as she had no known illnesses, according to close family sources. On March 14, 2017, Sledge's cause of death was ruled "natural causes" related to a pre-existing condition.

A private memorial service was held in Scottsdale, Arizona, on March 22. Her younger sister Kathy Sledge performed "There's Something About That Name" by Bill and Gloria Gaither and was later joined by her other sisters Debbie Sledge and Kim Sledge. Condolences were read from Flavor Flav, Aretha Franklin, Elton John, and Ruth Pointer. The March 25 Homegoing Service was held at Deliverance Evangelistic Church in Philadelphia. She laid to rest at Ivy Hill Cemetery in Philadelphia.

== Personal life ==
Sledge had a son named Thaddeus Everett Whyte IV from her marriage to Thaddeus E. Whyte III which was from 1992 until 2000. Sometime during her career, Sledge briefly lived in Paris, France and studied at Sorbonne University.

== Discography ==
Albums

- Joni (2009)

== Filmography ==
- 1980: The John Davidson Show — Herself (1 episode)
- 1981: Kids Are People, Too — Herself (1 episode)
- 1982: Fridays — Herself (1 episode)
- 1984: The Jeffersons — Joni Satin (Season 10, Episode 16; My Guy, George)
- 2000: 100 Greatest Dance Songs of Rock & Roll — Herself
- 2006: Archive Footage:Be My Baby: The Girl Group Story — Herself (uncredited)
- 2008: Soul Power — Herself (with Sister Sledge) (uncredited; 1974 concert series from "The Rumble in the Jungle" between Muhammad Ali and George Foreman in Zaire)
