= Kathy Sledge =

American singer–songwriter and producer (born 1959)

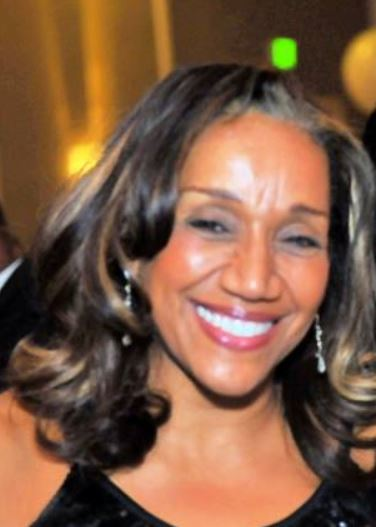
- Sledge in 2015
- Born: January 6, 1959 (age 67); Philadelphia, Pennsylvania, U.S.
- Other name: Kathie Sledge
- Education: Temple University
- Occupations: Singer; songwriter; music producer
- Years active: 1965–present
- Spouse: Philip Lightfoot (m. 1981)
- Children: 2
- Relatives: Debbie Sledge (sister); Joni Sledge (sister); Kim Sledge (sister)
- Musical career
- Genres: R&B; disco; house; pop; soul
- Instrument: Vocals
- Labels: Atco; Cotillion; Atlantic
- Website: https://www.kathysledge.com/

Kathy Sledge (born January 6, 1959) is an American singer–songwriter and music producer. She rose to fame in the 1970s as a member of Sister Sledge, one of the highest-selling female groups of the 1970s.

Sledge sang lead on their US top 10 songs "He's the Greatest Dancer" and "We Are Family", the latter of which received a nomination for Best R&B Performance by a Duo or Group with Vocals at the 22nd Annual Grammy Awards in 1980. She also sang lead on their UK number-one song "Frankie. She continued performing with group until 1989.

In 1989, Sledge pursued her solo career, releasing her debut album Heart on Epic Records in 1992. The album's lead single, "Take Me Back to Love Again", peaked atop of the Hot Dance Music/Club Play chart. In 1997, she featured on an international hit song "Freedom" with Robert Miles. From 1993 to 2011, Sledge occasionally reunited with Sister Sledge in one-off performances. In 2011, Sledge began collaborating with several music producers and releasing songs that have found success on the US Dance Club Songs chart. In 2021, Sledge began touring with her own spin-off group Sister Sledge featuring Kathy Sledge.

== Early life ==
Katherine Sledge was born in Philadelphia, Pennsylvania, on January 6, 1959. Her mother, Florez Sledge (née Williams), was an actress, while her father, Edwin Edgar Sledge, was a Broadway performer and member of tap dance duo Fred and Sledge. Her elder sisters Norma Carol, Debbie, Joni, and Kim, are also singers. Her maternal grandmother, Viola Williams, was an opera singer.

Her vocals were discovered by her grandmother at the age of six. Sledge's interest in music and performing grew after she competed in local talent shows at the age of six. She also performed at her family church Williams Temple Christian Methodist Episcopal Church. During her teenage years, she enrolled in Olney High School, where she graduated from in 1977.

== Career ==
=== 1965–1989: Sister Sledge ===
In 1965, Sledge formed the female group The Sledge Sisters; alongside her sisters Debbie Sledge, Joni Sledge, and Kim Sledge. The group performed in local clubs. In 1971, they debuted as Sisters Sledge, releasing their first single "Time Will Tell" on New York City-based record label Money Back Records. In 1973, they began performing as Sister Sledge and signed with Atco Records, a subsidiary of Atlantic Records. They released two singles, "The Weatherman" and "Mama Never Told Me", the latter of which had minor success on the UK singles chart. In 1975, Sister Sledge released their debut album Circle of Love, which peaked at number 56 on Billboard's Soul LP's chart. In mid-1970s, Atco Records began focusing more on hard rock acts and some British and European bands. As a result, Sister Sledge changed label rosters to Cotillion Records, another subsidiary of Atlantic Records.

Sister Sledge released their second album Together in 1977, which spawned a minor hit song "Blockbuster Boy". After the album's commercial failure, Cotillion Records paired the group with music producers Nile Rodgers and Bernard Edwards of disco group Chic. The group's third album, We Are Family, was released in January 1979 and peaked number three on the US Billboard 200, later achieving platinum status in the country. The record spawned the singles "He's the Greatest Dancer", "We Are Family", and "Lost in Music"; the former two topped the US Hot Soul Singles chart and charted within the top ten on the Billboard Hot 100. "We Are Family" received a nomination for Best R&B Performance by a Duo or Group with Vocals at the 1980 Grammy Awards. Sister Sledge went on to release four more albums on Cotillion Records: Love Somebody Today (1980), All American Girls (1981), The Sisters (1982), and Bet Cha Say That to All the Girls (1983).

In 1985, Cotillion Records became a defunct and Sister Sledge moved its parent label roster Atlantic Records. They released an album When the Boys Meet the Girls, which experienced mainstream success in the United Kingdom. Following the release of their greatest hits compilation Freak Out: The Greatest Hits of Chic and Sister Sledge in 1987, Sister Sledge took a hiatus.

=== 1989–1997: Heart and subsequent releases ===
In 1989, Sledge embarked a solo career and signed with Epic Records. In February 1992, she released her debut single "Take Me Back to Love Again", which peaked atop of the US Hot Dance Club Play chart. Sledge released debut solo album, Heart, on March 17, 1992. The album peaked at number 86 on the US Top R&B Albums chart. The single "Heart" peaked at number sixteen on the US Hot Dance Club Play chart. With the album's final single, "All of My Love", only reaching at number 56 on the US Hot R&B Singles chart, Sledge left Epic Records in 1993.

In January 1993, she re-joined Sister Sledge for a European Tour. The group also performed on British television programs Later... with Jools Holland and Top of the Pops. By 1994, she had parted ways with Sister Sledge again and moved further with her solo career. In January 1995, she released a cover version of Stevie Wonder's "Another Star" on house music record label Narcotic Records, which peaked at number 54 on the UK Singles Chart and number two on the UK Dance Singles chart. She released a follow-up single, "Another Day", which peaked at number 85 on the UK Singles Chart and number eight on the UK Dance Singles chart. Sledge featured on Swiss-Italian musician Robert Miles' song "Freedom" for his album 23am (1997). The single peaked at number three in Italy, and also peaked within the top twenty of other European countries.

=== 1998–2002: Reunion with Sister Sledge ===
In December 2000, Sledge briefly reunited with Sister Sledge for Christmas performance at the White House for former-President Bill Clinton. In 2001, Sledge toured with the group and also appeared alongside the group during the 2001 version of "We Are Family". In the same year, she featured on Sylk 130's song "Rising", which peaked at number twenty on the US Dance Club Songs chart. In February 2003, Sledge performed "We Are Family" alongside Sister Sledge during the halftime of the game between the Los Angeles Clippers and the New York Knicks at Madison Square Garden on in New York City. She recorded another album with Sister Sledge titled Style in 2003; which featured all of the original members, although the album only received a limited-edition release.

=== 2005–present: Sister Sledge featuring Kathy Sledge ===
By 2005, Sledge had formed her own version of Sister Sledge; which included her daughter Kristen Gabrielle and friend Su Wingate. Billed as "Kathy Sledge" or "Sister Sledge, they began performing together throughout the following years. In April 2011, Kathy rejoined the original group for a one-off televised performance of "We Are Family" on The Oprah Winfrey Show. In June 2011, Sledge released a single, "Give Yourself Up", with Adam Barta on Universal Records. The song peaked at number twenty on the US Dance Club Songs chart. In 2012, she reformed her own version of Sister Sledge and began booking performances. Billed as Sister Sledge, the group performed at several events including the Etam Spring/Summer 2012 Fashion Show. In July 2013, Debbie Sledge and Joni Sledge sued Kathy for misuse of the Sister Sledge, resulting in Kathy only being able to use the name as a "factually descriptive term".

In September 2013, Sledge was the first artist to sign with the newly formed Pacific Electronic Music record label by Jerry L. Greenberg, Max Martire, and Lenny Ibizarre. On September 25, 2013, Sledge received an "Outstanding Contribution to Music" award at the 16th Annual DJ Awards at Pacha, Ibiza. In 2014, she released two singles: Aristofreeks remix of "We Are Family" and "Keep It Moving", the latter of which peaked at number two on the US Dance Club Songs chart. Later that year, she was bestowed the Linda Creed Shining Star Award from The Artists United. In 2015, she continued to release songs with the Aristofreeks including "Thinking of You" and "Get On Up", the latter of which peaked at number eight on the US Dance Club Songs chart. In 2020, Sledge and her daughter Kristen launched their own web-series talk show FamilyRoom. In 2021, Sledge began performing as Sister Sledge featuring Kathy Sledge after acquiring the "Sister Sledge" trademark name back in 2017.

== Artistry ==
=== Voice and musical style ===
Sledge's voice is classified as a contralto. Several publications have described her voice as "distinctive" and "unique". Christian John Wikane of PopMatters described Sledge's voice as "tonic for the soul." American musician and music producer Narada Michael Walden adds "Kathy is raw, rugged, and rough, tough and ready for all singing occasions." Her music includes various styles of musical genres such as contemporary R&B, disco, house, and jazz. Although her debut album Heart (1992) followed a contemporary R&B sound, Sledge primarily shifted into house music in 2014.

=== Influences ===
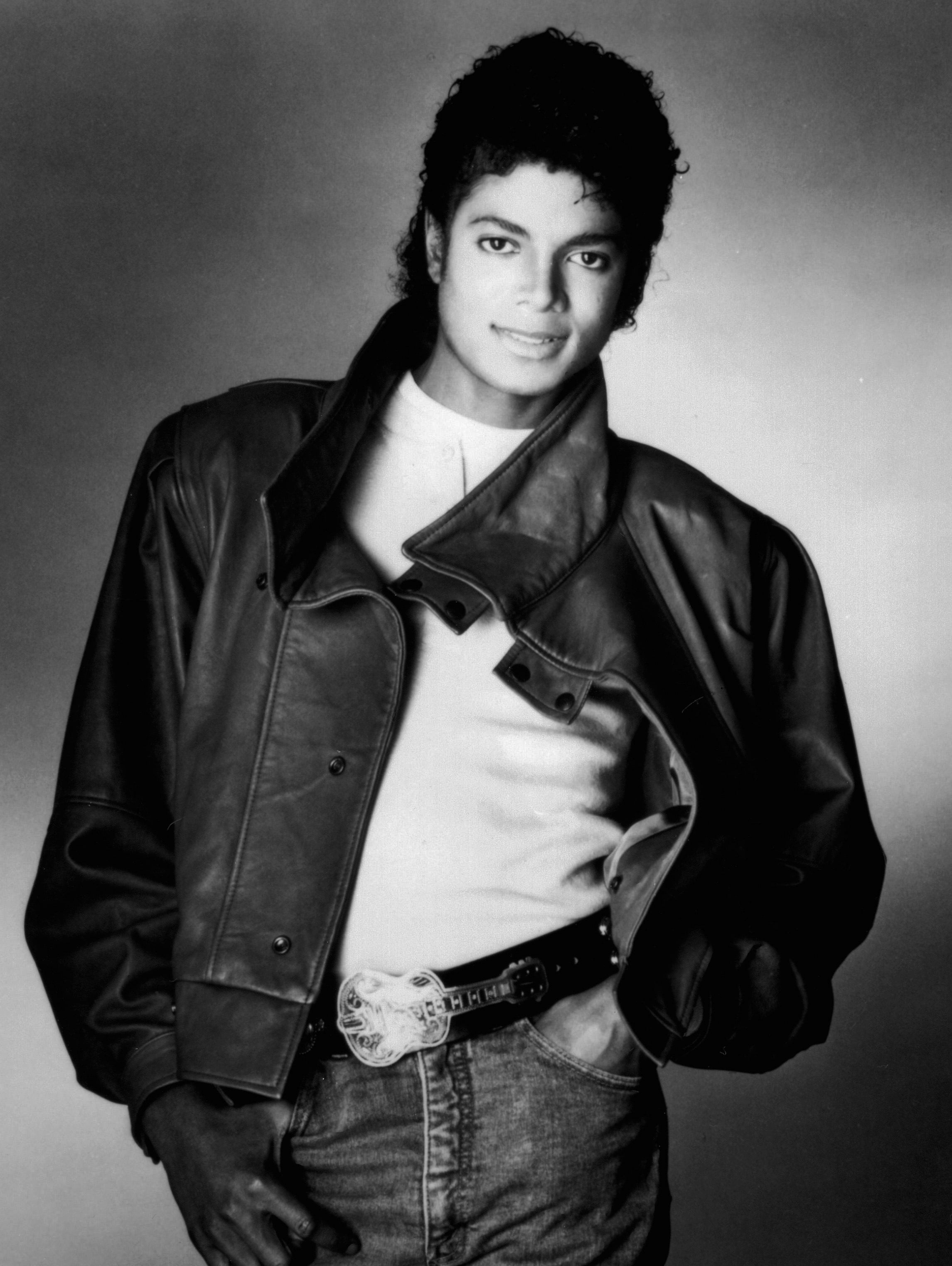
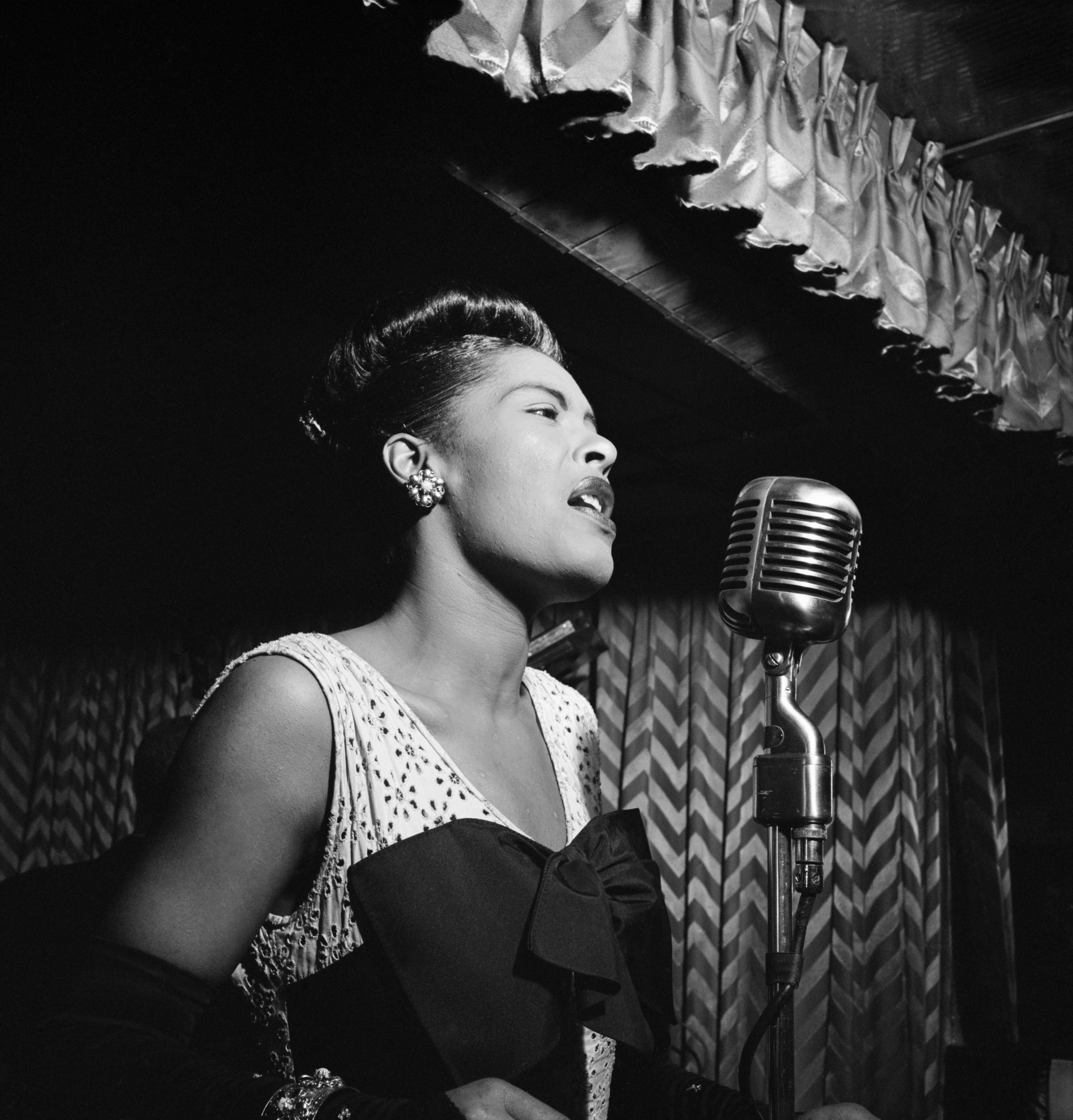
Sledge's major influences include Michael Jackson (left) and Billie Holiday (right).

Sledge has named Michael Jackson as one of her greatest musical influences. Sledge recalled being accompanied a record store on Market Street in West Philadelphia, by her elder sister Carol, to buy the 7-inch single "I'll Be There" by The Jackson 5 after hearing the song on the radio. Sledge toured alongside The Jacksons during their Destiny World Tour in 1979. She has also credited Billie Holiday as her favorite jazz artist. In 2010, Sledge created a tribute show to Holiday titled The Brighter Side of Day: A Tribute to Billie Holiday.

Other artists that Sledge has mentioned as inspirations include James Brown, Prince, Stevie Wonder, Diana Ross, and Mavis Staples. She has cited Gladys Knight's vocal style—especially on her song "Midnight Train to Georgia"—as an early influence that inspired her to practice phrasing.

== Philanthropy ==
Sledge served one of the board of directors for the nonprofit organization We Are Family Foundation. She retired from that position after becoming an honorary trustee. In December 2015, Sledge became the first celebrity ambassador for the Halo Foundation.

== Personal life ==
Sledge has been married to musician Philip Lightfoot since 1981 and together they have two children, Kristen (b. 1983) and Phillip Jr. (b. 1985).

== Discography ==
=== Albums ===
Title	Album details	Peak chart positions
Title	Album details	US R&B
Heart	Released: 1992; Labels: Epic; Formats: CD, cassette LP	86

=== Singles ===
As main artist

Title	Year	Peak chart positions			Album
Title	Year	US R&B	US Dance	UK	Album
"Take Me Back to Love Again"	1992	24	1	62	Heart
"Heart"	1992	—	16	—	Heart
"All of My Love"	1992	57	—	—	Heart
"Another Star"	1995	—	—	54	Non-album singles
"Another Day"	1995	—	—	85	Non-album singles
"Good Times"	1995	—	—	—	Non-album singles
"Do You Want to Know a Secret"	2014	—	—	—	Non-album singles
"A Little a Lot"	2014	—	—	—	Non-album singles
"Love Will"	2014	—	—	—	Non-album singles
"Falling Deep in Love" (with Horse Meat Disco)	2019	—	—	—	Non-album singles
"Jump into the Light" (with Horse Meat Disco)	2020	—	—	—	Non-album singles
"Good Times Are Coming Back Around"	2020	—	—	—	Non-album singles

As a featured artist

Title	Year	Peak chart positions		Album
Title	Year	US Dance	US Electronic	Album
"Freedom" (Robert Miles featuring Kathy Sledge)	1997	—	—	23am
"Rising" (Sylk 130 featuring Kathy Sledge)	2001	25	—	Non-album single
"Give Yourself Up (To the Music)" (Adam Barta featuring Kathy Sledge)	2011	20	—	Non-album single
"Keep It Movin" (Aristofreeks featuring Kathy Sledge)	2014	2	24	Non-album single
"We Are Family" (Aristofreeks featuring Kathy Sledge)	2014	—	—	Non-album single
"Thank You" (Aristofreeks featuring Kathy Sledge)	2014	—	—	Non-album single
"Thinking of You" (Aristofreeks featuring Kathy Sledge)	2015	—	—	Non-album single
"Get On Up" (Aristofreeks featuring Kathy Sledge)	2015	8	33	Non-album single

== Filmography ==
- 1975, 1977, 1982, 1983, 1992: Soul Train — Herself (5 episodes)
- 1979: American Bandstand — Herself (1 episode)
- 1982: Fridays — Herself (1 episode)
- 1984: The Jeffersons — Kathy Satin (1 episode)
- 1992: It's Showtime at the Apollo — Herself (1 episode)
- 2000: 100 Greatest Dance Songs of Rock & Roll — Herself
- 2006: Archive Footage:Be My Baby: The Girl Group Story — Herself (uncredited)
- 2008: Soul Power — Herself with Sister Sledge (uncredited; 1974 concert series from the "Rumble in the Jungle" between Muhammad Ali and George Foreman in Zaire)

== See also ==
- List of number-one dance hits (United States)
- List of artists who reached number one on the US Dance chart
