= All American Girls (song) =

1981 single by Sister Sledge

Single by Sister Sledge

from the album All American Girls
- B-side: "Happy Feeling"
- Released: March 1981
- Recorded: 1980
- Genre: Disco; R&B; Pop
- Label: Cotillion Records
- Songwriter(s): Allee Willis; Joni Sledge; Lisa Walden
- Producer(s): Narada Michael Walden

Sister Sledge singles chronology
"Let's Go on Vacation" (1980)	"All American Girls" (1981)	"Next Time You'll Know" (1981)

"All American Girls" is a song by the American group Sister Sledge. It was originally released in 1981 as a single. The song became an international hit.

It was written by songwriter Allee Willis along with Joni Sledge and Narada Michael Walden's then wife Lisa Walden. Released in January 1981, the song peaked at number three on the R&B/Soul charts and 79 on the Hot 100 charts in late March 1981. It was also a Top 10 hit in the Low Countries, reaching number eight in the Netherlands and number six in Belgium (Flanders). It also charted in Germany (number 27), Italy (number 34) and the UK (number 41).

The song is a patriotic hymn to feminism and the right of American women to receive the same professional and social recognition as men; the song was regarded as a patriotic and propaganda piece by Ronald Reagan's then newly elected conservative government and is often used as a soundtrack for feminist parades of black women's rights.

== Track listings ==
7" single "All American Girls"

A. "All American Girls"

(Allee Willis, Joni Sledge, Lisa Walden)

B. "Happy Feeling"

(Kathy Sledge)

Cotillion Records 46007

== Charts ==
=== Weekly charts ===
Chart (1981)	Peak position
Belgium (Ultratop 50 Flanders)	6
Italy (FIMI)	34
Netherlands (Dutch Top 40)	6
Netherlands (Single Top 100)	8
UK Singles (OCC)	41
US Billboard Hot 100	79
US Hot R&B/Hip-Hop Songs (Billboard)	3
West Germany (GfK)	27

=== Year-end charts ===
Chart (1981)	Position
Belgium (Ultratop Flanders)	47
Italy (FIMI)	94
Netherlands (Dutch Top 40)	64
Netherlands (Single Top 100)	89
US Hot R&B/Hip-Hop Songs (Billboard)	37
