= When the Boys Meet the Girls =

When the Boys Meet the Girls may refer to:

- When the Boys Meet the Girls (film), a 1965 American musical film
- When the Boys Meet the Girls (album), a 1985 album by Sister Sledge
