= We Are Family (album) =

Studio album by Sister Sledge
- Released: January 22, 1979
- Recorded: August–November 1978
- Studios: Power Station, New York City
- Genres: Disco, R&B
- Length: 43:56
- Label: Cotillion
- Producers: Nile Rodgers, Bernard Edwards

Sister Sledge chronology
Together (1977)	We Are Family (1979)	Love Somebody Today (1980)

Singles from We Are Family
- 1. "He's the Greatest Dancer" Released: February 3, 1979; 2. "We Are Family" Released: April 1979; 3. "Lost in Music" Released: August 1979; 4. "Thinking of You" Released: June 1984

We Are Family is the third album by the American vocal group Sister Sledge. It was released on January 22, 1979, by Cotillion Records. Following their 1977 album Together, Sister Sledge enlisted a new array of collaborators, including Chic musicians and producers Bernard Edwards and Nile Rodgers who shifted the group away from their Philly soul roots, emphasizing disco and R&B music instead.

We Are Family is widely considered Sister Sledge's breakthrough album. It debuted at number 142 on the US Billboard 200, and later peaked at number 3. The album went on to become certified platinum by the Recording Industry Association of America (RIAA) for shipments of over a million units in the US. Four singles were produced—"He's the Greatest Dancer", "We Are Family", "Lost in Music", and "Thinking of You". "He's the Greatest Dancer" and "We Are Family" became Sister Sledge's first two top-ten US Billboard Hot 100 songs as well as their first two US Hot Soul Singles and US National Disco Action chart toppers.

According to music magazine Billboard, We Are Family was the fourth best-selling album of 1979, making Sister Sledge the sixth most successful music act of 1979. The song "We Are Family" earned a nomination for Best R&B Performance by a Duo or Group with Vocals at the 22nd Annual Grammy Awards (1980).

== Background ==
After the minor success of their previous album Together (1977), the group grew disappointed about lack of breakthrough success. According to Joni Sledge, the group has contemplated leaving the music industry and pursuing other careers. During this time, Kim Sledge had already enrolled in law school. Atlantic Records decided that Sister Sledge should record a disco album to reflect the genre's mainstream popularity. To bolster the group's profile, Atlantic Records paired the group with Chic musicians and producers Nile Rodgers and Bernard Edwards who had just achieved success with their albums Chic (1977) and C'est Chic (1978); the latter of which spawned the number-one hit "Le Freak".

== Recording and production ==
The recording of the album took place over a four-month period. Sister Sledge recorded the album at Power Station, a recording studio in New York City frequently used by Bernard Edwards and Nile Rodgers for recording albums. Edwards and Rodgers wrote and produced the entire album. During the record sessions, Sister Sledge member Debbie Sledge and Bernard Edwards often disagreed on harmonies, sometimes resulting in one or both them leaving out of the studio with Nile Rodgers mediating the disagreement. When Edwards and Rodgers produced "Lost in Music", Debbie Sledge felt the song was too repetitive.

Much of what Edwards and Rodgers wrote and produced was kept secret from Sister Sledge, only showing the lyrics to the group once they were in front of the studio microphones as Rodgers wanted "spontaneity" in the music. The song "We Are Family" was written by Edwards and Rodgers for Sister Sledge after working with them. In an interview with UK national radio station Smooth Radio, Kathy Sledge recalled "[Atlantic Records president] Jerry started describing my sisters and myself [to Bernard Edwards and Nile Rodgers]: 'You gotta meet these girls, they're family. They flock together like birds of a feather.'" The song "We Are Family" was recorded in one take.

== Release and promotion ==
We Are Family was released on January 22, 1979, by Cotillion Records. On April 30, 1979, it was released in the United Kingdom. To promote We Are Family, Sister Sledge appeared on various television and award shows throughout 1979. Sister Sledge performed the album's singles "He's the Greatest Dancer" and "We Are Family" on American Bandstand in March 1979. In May 1979, they appeared on Dutch television program TopPop to perform "He's the Greatest Dancer" and "We Are Family". Also in the same month, they performed "He's the Greatest Dancer" on The Merv Griffin Show. They returned in June 1979 to perform "We Are Family" for TROS Top 50. In August 1979, they performed "We Are Family" on The Merv Griffin Show.

In September 1979, Sister Sledge performed "Thinking of You" on The Merv Griffin Show. Later that month, they returned to the Netherlands to perform "Lost in Music" on TopPop. In 1980, they performed "We Are Family" on new Italian pop music show Popcorn.

In 1995, We Are Family was digitally remastered and reissued on CD by Rhino Records. The remastered edition featured two remixed versions of "Lost in Music" and "We Are Family"; both of which had been previously released outside of the United States as remixed singles in 1984 and 1993, respectively.

=== Singles ===
"He's the Greatest Dancer" was released as the lead single from We Are Family on February 3, 1979, to positive reviews. A commercial success, it peaked at number 9 on the US Billboard Hot 100 and atop US Hot Soul Singles and US National Disco Action charts. Internationally, it peaked in the top-ten on the UK Singles Chart, being certified gold by the British Phonographic Industry (BPI). The accompanying music video for "He's the Greatest Dancer" aired on several TV stations. The music video was eventually uploaded to Rhino Records' YouTube channel on February 18, 2025.

"We Are Family" was released as the second single from the album in April 1979 and received widespread critical acclaim. It was a commercial success, peaking at number 2 on the US Billboard Hot 100 on June 16, 1979, and spent seven weeks in the top ten. It peaked atop the US Hot Soul Singles and US National Disco Action charts, becoming their second song to achieve this on both charts. "We Are Family" received a gold certification by the Recording Industry Association of America (RIAA). Internationally, it reached the top position in Canada and the top-ten in European countries New Zealand, Switzerland, and the United Kingdom; the latter of which earned a platinum certification by the British Phonographic Industry (BPI). Two accompanying performance videos were released for "We Are Family", one of which only features Joni, Kim, and Kathy.

"Lost in Music", featuring lead vocals by Joni Sledge, was released as the third single from We Are Family in August 1979. Although not as successful as its predecessors, the song peaked atop of the US National Disco Action chart. It also peaked at number 17 on the UK Singles chart. A remix of the song was released in September 1984, which peaked at number 4 on the UK Singles chart. It earned a gold certification by the British Phonographic Industry (BPI). The song again charted in March 1993 after another remix was released, which peaked at number 14 on the UK Singles chart.

Although "Thinking of You" was not released as a single during that time period, the song was released as a single in May 1984. It peaked at number 11 on the UK Singles chart. A remix of the song was released in June 1993, which peaked at number 17 on the UK Singles chart.

=== Tour ===
The group toured as the opening act for the Jacksons on the Destiny World Tour. In May 1979, Debbie Sledge went on maternity leave. During most of the tour and several televised performances, she was replaced by her elder sister Carol Sledge, who had also replaced her in 1977. Aside from this, Sister Sledge also performed part of the tour as a trio with Joni Sledge, Kim Sledge, and Kathy Sledge.

== Commercial performance ==
We Are Family debuted at number 142 on the US Billboard 200 on February 24, 1979. We Are Family also marked their debut on the Billboard 200. On April 10, 1979, We Are Family earned a gold certification by the Recording Industry Association of America (RIAA). We Are Family gradually rose up the chart and entered the top-ten at number 8 on May 12, 1979. On May 23, 1979, it received a platinum certification by the Recording Industry Association of America (RIAA). On June 16, 1979, We Are Family peaked at number 3 and remained there the following week. Over the ongoing weeks, the album fell down the chart while still maintaining a top-ten position until July 14, 1979, where it fell to number 14. After thirty-three weeks on the Billboard 200, the album fell off the charts in October 1979. We Are Family also topped the US Top Soul LP's chart, becoming their first album to achieve this. By the end of 1979, the album became the fourth best-selling album of that year in the United States.

Internationally, We Are Family was met with similar success. In Canada, it reached number 4 on the Canadian Albums Chart, staying at the position for two weeks. In the United Kingdom, We Are Family entered the UK Albums Chart a total of three times. In its first run, it debuted at number 15 on the UK Albums Chart on May 12, 1979. We Are Family gradually moved down the charts to its final position at number 74 on August 4, 1979. It fell off the charts the following week. On September 1, 1979, We Are Family re-entered the chart at number 73, due to the success of the album's third single "Lost in Music". Marking its second chart run, it rose to number 36 on September 22, 1979, before falling back down the charts again. On October 20, 1979, it rose up again to number 37 but then fell to number 75 the following week and fell off the charts for the second time. We Are Family re-entered the chart at number 15 for the third time in September 1984, due to the streamline release of successful singles "Thinking of You" and remixes of "Lost in Music" and "We Are Family". The following week on October 6, 1984, We Are Family peaked at number 7 on the UK Albums Chart, staying at the position for two weeks. The British Phonographic Industry (BPI) certified the album gold for shipping 100,000 units.

== Critical reception ==
Professional ratings
Review scores
Source	Rating
AllMusic	4.5/5 stars
Christgau's Record Guide	B+
Mojo	4/5 stars
Pitchfork	8.6/10
The Rolling Stone Album Guide	3/5 stars
Smash Hits	7/10
The Virgin Encyclopedia of R&B and Soul	3/5 stars

We Are Family received generally positive reviews from music critics. The New York Times wrote that Edwards and Rodgers "have distilled disco down to its seductive essentials... The result is a spare, spacious elegance." Andy Kellman of AllMusic felt that although the album is "very Chic-sounding", he also stated that "Both creatively and commercially, We Are Family is Sister Sledge's crowning achievement".

== Accolades and legacy ==
In 2008, "We Are Family" was inducted into the Grammy Hall of Fame. In 2017, "We Are Family" was inducted into the National Recording Registry by the Library of Congress. Nile Rodgers stated that although he has written and produced many albums for different music acts, he felt that We Are Family was his best-produced album.

=== Listicles ===
Listicles for We Are Family
Year	Publication	List	Position	Ref.
1979	Billboard	Top Overall New Artists	3	
1979	Billboard	Top Overall Female Artists	4	
1979	Billboard	Top Overall Soul Artists	5	
1979	Billboard	Top Disco Acts of the Year	6	
1979	Billboard	Top Overall Pop Groups	21	
1979	Billboard	Top Single Artists	12	
1979	Billboard	Honor Roll of New Album Artists	6	
1979	Billboard	Top Albums (1979)	4	
1979	Billboard	Top Albums Artist	5	
1979	Billboard	Top Single Groups	10	
1979	Billboard	Top Album of the Year	49	
1979	Billboard	Top Single Artists of the Year	17	
2013	NME	The 500 Greatest Albums of All Time	340	

== Track listing ==
All songs written by Bernard Edwards and Nile Rodgers.

1. "He's the Greatest Dancer" – 6:16
2. "Lost in Music" – 4:52
3. "Somebody Loves Me" – 4:59
4. "Thinking of You" – 4:31
5. "We Are Family" – 8:24
6. "Easier to Love" – 5:05
7. "You're a Friend to Me" – 5:31
8. "One More Time" – 3:17

=== Remastered CD bonus tracks ===
The remastered CD was released in 1995.

1. "We Are Family" (Sure Is Pure Remix) – 8:05
2. "We Are Family" (Steve Anderson DMC Remix) – 8:13
3. "Lost in Music" (Sure Is Pure Remix) – 8:38
4. "Lost in Music" (1984 Bernard Edwards and Nile Rodgers Remix) – 6:37

== Personnel ==
Sister Sledge

- Debbie Sledge – lead vocals (7), backing vocals (1–6, 8)
- Joni Sledge – lead vocals (2, 6), backing vocals (1, 3–5, 7–8)
- Kathy Sledge – lead vocals (1, 3, 4, 5), backing vocals (2, 6, 7, 8)
- Kim Sledge – lead vocals (8), backing vocals (1–7)

Studio musicians

- Nile Rodgers – guitar, production
- Bernard Edwards – bass
- Tony Thompson – drums
- Robert Sabino – piano, clavinet
- Raymond Jones – keyboards, Rhodes piano
- Andy Schwartz – piano
- Sammy Figueroa – percussion
- Jon Faddis – trumpet
- Ellen Seeling – trumpet
- Barry Rogers – trombone
- Jean Fineberg – saxophone
- Alex Foster – saxophone, flute
- Gene Orloff – concertmaster
- Cheryl Hong – strings
- Marianne Carroll – strings
- Karen Milne – strings
- Luther Vandross – backing vocals
- Norma Jean Wright – backing vocals
- David Lasley – backing vocals
- Alfa Anderson – backing vocals
- Diva Gray – backing vocals
- Simon Le Bon – additional vocals on "Lost in Music" (1984 mix)
- Andy Taylor – additional vocals on "Lost in Music" (1984 mix)

Technical

- Bob Defrin – art direction
- Jim Houghton – photography

== Charts ==
=== Weekly charts ===
Chart (1979–85)	Peak position
Australian Albums (Kent Music Report)	37
Canada Top Albums/CDs (RPM)	4
Dutch Albums (Album Top 100)	33
New Zealand Albums (RMNZ)	45
UK Albums (Official Charts)	7
US Billboard 200	3
US Top R&B/Hip-Hop Albums (Billboard)	1

=== Year-end charts ===
Chart (1979)	Position
Canada Top Albums/CDs (RPM)	28
US Billboard 200	37
US Top R&B/Hip-Hop Albums (Billboard)	4

== See also ==
- List of number-one R&B albums of 1979 (U.S.)
- List of number-one dance singles of 1979 (U.S.)
- List of number-one R&B singles of 1979 (U.S.)
