= Sister Sledge =

American vocal group

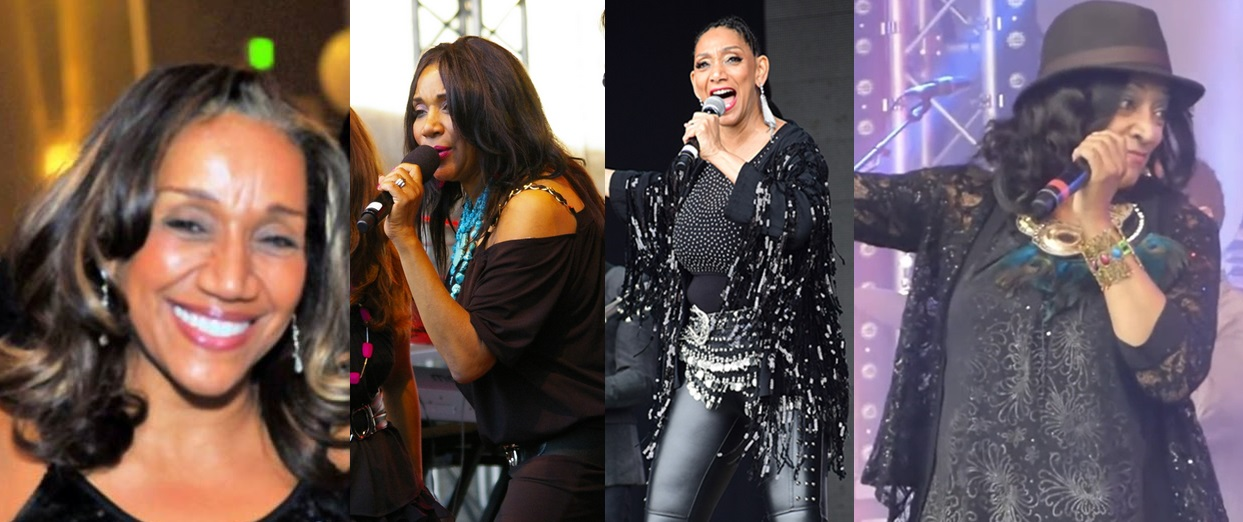
- Members: Kathy, Joni, Debbie, Kim (left to right)

Background information
- Origin: Philadelphia, Pennsylvania, U.S.
- Genres: R&B; disco; pop; Philly soul
- Works: discography
- Years active: 1965–2020
- Labels: Atco; Cotillion; Atlantic
- Past members: Debbie Sledge; Joni Sledge; Kim Sledge; Kathy Sledge
- Website: sistersledgelive.com sistersledge.com

Sister Sledge was an American vocal group composed of members of the Sledge family. The group was formed in Philadelphia, Pennsylvania, in 1965, and originally consisted of sisters Debbie, Joni, Kim, and Kathy Sledge. Their music crosses genres of R&B, disco, pop, rock and Philly soul.

Sister Sledge first performed in talent shows and clubs in Philadelphia and eventually signed with Money Back Records. In 1972, they left Money Back Records and signed with Atlantic Records subsidiary label Atco Records, where they released two Top 10 dance songs "Love Don't You Go Through No Changes on Me" (1974) and "Pain Reliever" (1975). The group were moved to another subsidiary label Cotillion Records in 1976. They released six studio albums between 1977 and 1983, including the successful albums We Are Family (1979) and Love Somebody Today (1980) and singles "He's the Greatest Dancer" (1979), "We Are Family" (1979), "Lost in Music" (1979), "All American Girls" (1981), and "My Guy" (1982). In mid-1980s, they experienced a resurgence in mainstream popularity after the release of their single "Thinking of You" and a remix of their earlier single "Lost in Music" peaked at number 4 in the United Kingdom. In 1985, their single "Frankie" topped the UK Singles chart for four consecutive weeks and became the fifth highest-selling single in the UK for that year.

In 1989, lead singer Kathy Sledge left the group and pursued a successful solo career. The three remaining members released the poorly received And Now...Sledge...Again compilation album in 1992, which featured several re-recordings of their earlier hit songs. In 1993, Kathy rejoined with the group for a European Tour after several dance remixes of their singles "We Are Family", "Lost in Music", and "Thinking of You" began charting in the UK Top 40. From 2000 to 2003, the four original members reunited on special occasions, among them was for the We Are Family Foundation. Following this, Sister Sledge went through different incarnations of the group composed of several family members and friends began performing in the group. After Joni's death in 2017 and Kim's exit in 2019, different factions of Sister Sledge surfaced. By 2021, Kathy Sledge began performing as Sister Sledge featuring Kathy Sledge, and Debbie Sledge began performing as Sister Sledge featuring Sledgendary. As of 2025, Kathy Sledge holds the rights to the trademark name "Sister Sledge".

Sister Sledge have sold over 20 million records worldwide, making them one of the highest-selling female groups of the 1970s. In 2017, they were inducted into the Philadelphia Music Alliance Walk of Fame. Their song "We Are Family" was inducted into the Grammy Hall of Fame and the National Recording Registry.

== History ==
=== 1965–1971: Formation and early years ===
In 1965, Philadelphia siblings Debbie Sledge (born 1954), Joni Sledge (1956–2017), Kim Sledge (born 1957), and Kathy Sledge (born 1959) formed the female group the Sledge Sisters. Vocally trained by their grandmother and opera singer Viola Williams, and managed by their mother Florez "Flo" Sledge, the group began performing regularly at their family's church Williams Temple Christian Methodist Episcopal and soon began performing in local clubs and political events throughout their hometown of Philadelphia. Over the early years of their career, they went through several name changes, becoming A Group Called Sledge, and the Brand New Generation. In 1971, they debuted as Sisters Sledge, releasing their first single "Time Will Tell" on New York City-based record label Money Back Records.

=== 1972–1975: Atco Records ===
In 1972, the group began performing as Sister Sledge and signed with Atco Records, a subsidiary of Atlantic Records. In 1973, they released two singles, "The Weatherman" and "Mama Never Told Me", the latter of which peaked at number 20 on the UK singles chart. In 1974, the group released another single titled "Love Don't Go Through No Changes On Me", which became a moderately successful song on the charts.

In 1975, Sister Sledge released their debut album Circle of Love. The album peaked at number 56 on Billboard's Soul LP's chart. The album spawn the singles "Love Has Found Me", "Circle of Love (Caught in the Middle)", and "Pain Reliever"; the latter of which peaked at number 7 on the US National Disco chart. By the mid-1970s, Atco Records began focusing more on hard rock acts and some British and European bands. As a result, Sister Sledge changed label rosters to Cotillion Records, another subsidiary of Atlantic Records.

=== 1976–1988: Cotillion Records and commercial breakthrough ===
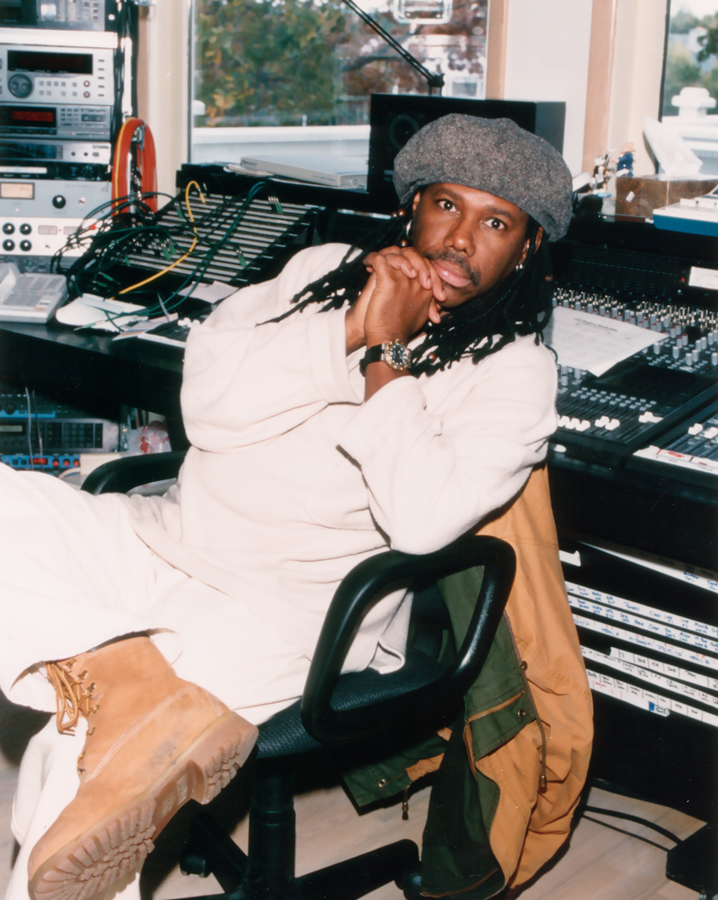
Nile Rodgers co-produced two of Sister Sledge's disco albums We Are Family (1979) and Love Somebody Today (1980).

In 1976, the group released two singles "Thank You for Today" and "Cream of the Crop", both of which failed to make a huge impact on the charts. In August 1977, the group released their second album Together. The album was considered a commercial failure as the album did not chart. The album's lead single, "Blockbuster Boy", also failed to reach the Top 40 and only peaked at number 61 on the US Hot Soul Singles chart. During this time, Debbie Sledge went on maternity leave and briefly replaced by her elder sister Carol Sledge for televised performances. To bolster the group's profile, Atlantic Records paired the group with Chic musicians and producers Nile Rodgers and Bernard Edwards to record a disco album as disco was rising in mainstream popularity.

The group's third album, We Are Family, was released in January 1979 and peaked number 3 on the US Billboard 200, later achieving platinum status in the United States for selling over a million copies. The album spawned the singles "He's the Greatest Dancer", "We Are Family", and "Lost in Music"; the former two both topped the US Hot Soul Singles chart and charted within the Top 10 on the Billboard Hot 100. "We Are Family" was certified gold by the RIAA, and received a nomination for Best R&B Performance by a Duo or Group with Vocals at the 1980 Grammy Awards.

During the group's Destiny World Tour with The Jacksons in mid-1979, Debbie Sledge went on maternity leave and was replaced again by her elder sister Carol Sledge. In 1980, they released their follow-up fourth album, Love Somebody Today, which was also produced by Nile Rodgers and Bernard Edwards. Four singles were issued from the album: the lead single "Got to Love Somebody", followed by "Reach Your Peak", "Let's Go on Vacation", and "Easy Street"; the first single hit number 7 on the Billboard R&B chart.

The group started shifting away from disco music as the genre began to decline in popularity. They began working with American musician Narada Michael Walden and songwriter Allee Willis on the recording on their next album. In February 1981, they released their fifth album All American Girls. The lead single and title-track, "All American Girls", followed the album's release and peaked at number 3 on the US Hot Soul Singles chart. "He's Just a Runaway", the second single from the album, spent peaked at number 6 on the US Dance chart. Having written or produced songs earlier songs in their career, the group began to take a more active role in the production of their next album. Released in January 1982, their sixth album The Sisters spawned a cover version of Mary Wells' song "My Guy". The song peaked at number 23 on the Billboard Hot 100, their highest-charting song since "We Are Family" in 1979.

After the release of their album Bet Cha Say That to All the Girls in 1983, the group's popularity began to fade as the album's singles "B.Y.O.B. (Bring Your Own Baby)" and "Gotta Get Back to Love" achieve minor success. In May 1984, the group experienced a resurgence of popularity in the United Kingdom when Cotillion Records re-issued their single "Thinking of You", which peaked at number 11 on the UK Singles chart. In September 1984, a remix of their song "Lost in Music" was released and peaked at number 4 on the UK Singles chart. "Thinking of You" and "Lost in Music" earned a gold certifications by the British Phonographic Industry (BPI) in the United Kingdom.

By 1985, Cotillion Records began closing down and as a result, Sister Sledge was moved to their parent label Atlantic Records. When the Boys Meet the Girls, the group's seventh studio album, was released on June 7, 1985, by Atlantic Records. The album became an instant success and earned a Silver certification within a month of its release by the British Phonographic Industry (BPI) in the United Kingdom. Much of the album's success was fueled by the lead single "Frankie" which peaked atop of the UK Singles chart and held the top position for four weeks. The song also earned a gold certification by the British Phonographic Industry (BPI) in the United Kingdom. In late 1987, Atlantic Records released a compilation album titled Freak Out: The Greatest Hits of Chic and Sister Sledge, which included successful hit songs by Sister Sledge and American disco group Chic. Following the release of the album, Sister Sledge left Atlantic Records in 1988.

=== 1989–2018: Lineup changes ===
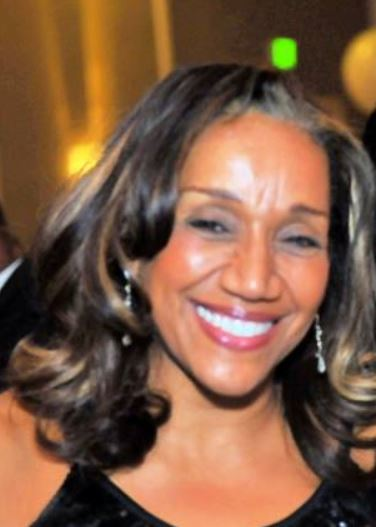
Lead singer Kathy Sledge left the group in 1989.

In 1989, lead singer Kathy Sledge departed from the group to pursue her solo career, leaving Sister Sledge to continue on as a trio. She signed to Epic Records and released her debut solo album Heart in 1992. In the same year, the remaining members of Sister Sledge recorded a compilation album titled And Now...Sledge...Again, which featured newly recorded songs as well as re-recorded versions of their earlier songs. In 1993, Kathy Sledge returned to the group for a European Tour after a remix of "We Are Family" by British group Sure Is Pure began charting in the United Kingdom, eventually peaking at number 5 on the UK Singles chart. Although Joni was not part of the European tour, she re-joined the group in 1994.

In November 1993, American singer Linda Howard performed in place of Kim Sledge during Sister Sledge's performance with the female group Jade during the A 70's Celebration: The Beat Is Back at the Wiltern Theatre in Los Angeles, California. In April 1996, they joined Chic for concert performance at Nippon Budokan in Chiyoda, Tokyo. The performance was recorded and released as a concert film titled Live at the Budokan. Sister Sledge returned to the studio later that year to record another album. Joni Sledge took on a more active role in the album's production, writing most of the songs on the album. Their ninth album African Eyes, was released in February 1998 on independent label Fahrenheit Records.

In early 2000, Kim departed from the group to focus on becoming an ordained minister. In December 2000, all four members performed at the White House for the President and First Lady at the final Christmas party of the Clinton administration. In the aftermath of September 11 attacks, Sister Sledge re-recorded "We Are Family" alongside other popular singers and musicians at the request of Tommy Boy Records president Tom Silverman. They also appeared in the accompanied documentary The Making and Meaning of We Are Family. In November 2001, they performed at the Denim and Diamonds Gala at Planet Hollywood benefiting the G&P Foundation for Cancer Research.

In 2002, Kim released her debut album Peaceful on independent record label Malaju Records. In February 2003, the original lineup performed "We Are Family" during the halftime of the game between the Los Angeles Clippers and the New York Knicks at Madison Square Garden on in New York City. The group released an album titled Style in 2003; which featured all of the original members, although the album only received a limited-edition release. In mid-2003, Debbie and Joni began touring as the lineup of Sister Sledge, often adding Debbie's younger daughter Camille Young (credited as Camille Sledge) as the third member in place of Kim.

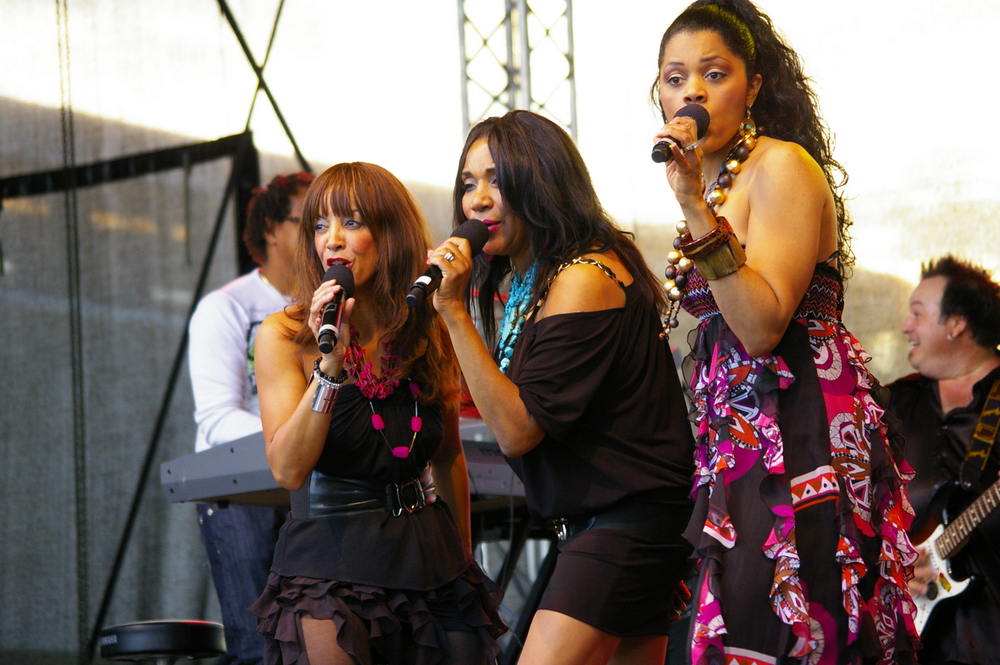
Chele' Davis, Joni Sledge, and Amber Sledge performing in Vienna. Austria

In May 2006, Debbie's eldest daughter Amber Young (credited as Amber Sledge) joined the touring lineup. By 2008, a lineup of Joni Sledge, Amber Sledge, and family friend Chele' Davis (replacing Debbie) began touring as Sister Sledge, with Debbie Sledge periodically performing in the lineup. In August 2009, a lineup of Kathy Sledge, her daughter Kristen Gabrielle, Amber Sledge, and Su Wingate performed as Sister Sledge at the first annual Rewind Festival in Henley-on-Thames. In October 2010, Kim contracted the H1N1 virus. Four months later while being treated for the virus, she contracted pneumonia and was admitted to intensive care unit in February 2011. In April 2011, Kim and Kathy rejoined the group for a televised performance of "We Are Family" on The Oprah Winfrey Show.

Kim continued to perform with Sister Sledge from late 2011 until early 2012, opting to continue with her evangelism during the time in which she created the Paradise Project, a separate gospel and ministry tour consisting of her, her children, and several special guest. In February 2012, Sister Sledge filed suit in federal court against Warner Music Group, alleging they had been cheated out of millions of dollars based on improper calculations of revenue from digital music sales. The lawsuit was settled out of court with Sister Sledge receiving a substantial payout.

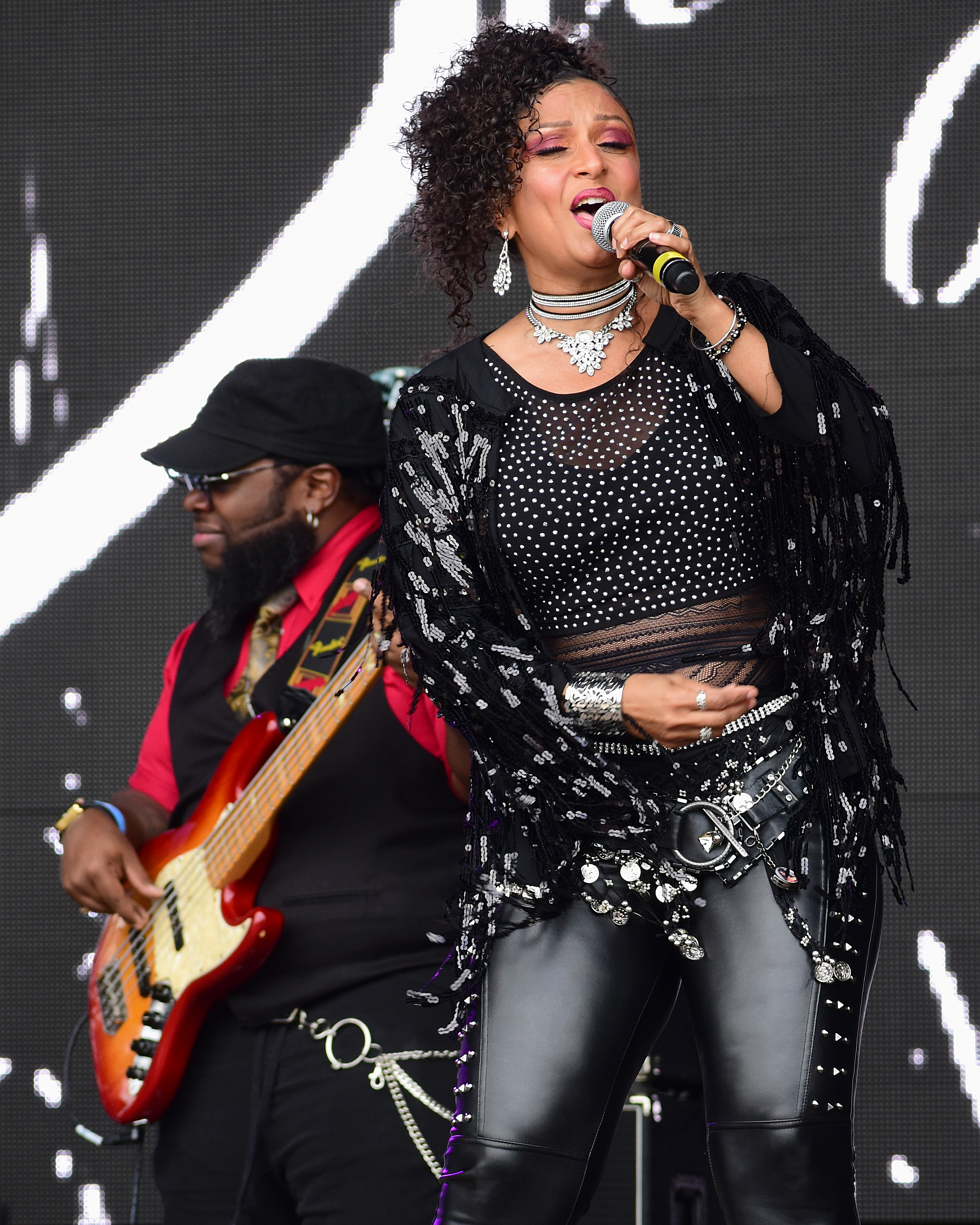
Tanya Ti-et began touring with the group in 2012.

In the summer of 2012, American singer Tanya Ti-et was added to the group, often standing in for either Joni or Kim Sledge. With Kim rejoining in 2015, Sister Sledge (Debbie, Joni, and Kim) began touring internationally and eventually performed at a large-scale charity benefit in London for Save the Children. They were invited to perform for Pope Francis at the World Festival of Families in Philadelphia at Eakins Oval on September 26, 2015. According to a representative of Kathy Sledge, Kathy had requested to join the group for the event but the other members refused to allow her to participate in the performance. In December 2015, Debbie Sledge had announced that group was working on another album titled Nothing is Greater Than Love, although the album never materialized.

On March 10, 2017, Joni Sledge died of natural causes at her home in Phoenix, Arizona, at age 60. Following Joni's death, Debbie and Kim announced that they will continue to perform as Sister Sledge, and Tanya Ti-et who throughout 2016 had been performing in place of Joni would continue with the group as a touring member. In July 2018, Kim Sledge announced that she was developing a feature film titled Life Song, which would chronicle the career and stardom of Sister Sledge. In 2019, Kim Sledge departed from the group again and was replaced by Camille Sledge.

=== 2019–present: Spinoff groups ===
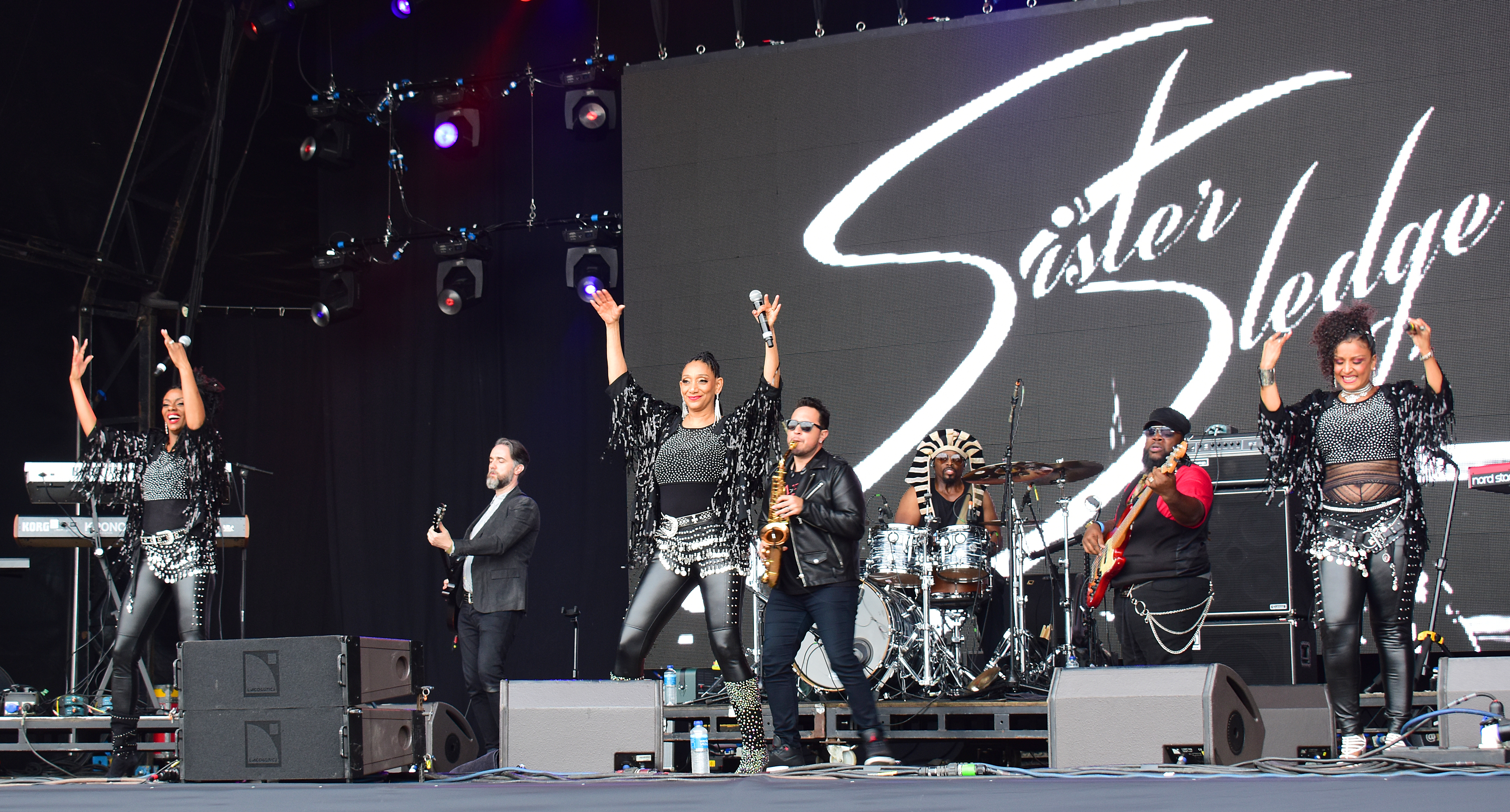
Camille, Debbie, and Tanya performing as Sister Sledge featuring Sledgendary (2021)

Kim joined Kathy's lineup of Sister Sledge, which had previously consisted of Kathy's daughter Kristen Gabrielle, and friend Su Wingate whom had been touring as Sister Sledge as early as 2005. For the late duration of 2019, Kathy and Kim toured together and billed themselves as Sister Sledge, adding their daughters Kristen and Julie to the lineup.

By 2021, Debbie Sledge had rebranded her lineup as Sister Sledge featuring Sledgendary; a group consisting of her, two of her children Camille Sledge (born Camille Young) and David Sledge (David Young), Joni Sledge's son Thaddeus Sledge (born Thaddeus Whyte IV), and Tanya Ti-et. In the same year, Kathy Sledge began performing as Sister Sledge featuring Kathy Sledge, which included her and rotating background singers and dancers. In February 2022, Sister Sledge featuring Sledgendary released their debut single titled "Free".

== Artistry ==
=== Musical styles and themes ===
Sister Sledge primarily recorded R&B and soul material in their early career. In the group's original lineup, Kathy was the primarily lead vocalist, Joni was the second lead vocalist, with Debbie and Kim doing the harmonies. Despite this, each member performed lead vocals on different songs on the album. Following Kathy's departure, Kim performed most of Kathy's parts in performances. As a trio, Joni became the primarily lead singer on their album African Eyes (1998), with Kim becoming the second lead vocalist. In reviewing their debut album Circle of Love (1975), music critic Alex Henderson of AllMusic compared the group to sounding like "a younger version of the Three Degrees". On their album We Are Family (1979), all four members sang lead on the album. During the rise of disco music in the 1970s, Sister Sledge shifted their sound to disco, becoming one of the most popular music acts in disco music. After disco music began to decline in 1981, the group moved away from the genre, opting for a more pop-infused rock sound, starting with their album All American Girls (1981).

=== Influences ===
Members of Sister Sledge cited music acts such as James Brown, Prince, Stevie Wonder, Diana Ross, and Mavis Staples. Kathy has cited Gladys Knight's vocal style—especially on her song "Midnight Train to Georgia"—as an early influence that inspired her to practice phrasing.

== Lawsuits ==
In 1983, the group and their mother/manager Flo Sledge trademarked the "Sister Sledge" name, giving each sister a quarter interest. After the registration lapsed, Joni Sledge attempted to renew the trademark alone, without her sisters, in February 1998. Debbie, Kim, and Kathy opposed the application as it only included Joni's name. In 2006, Debbie, Joni, Kim, and Kathy formed Sister Sledge LLC with each member receiving a share. They later applied for and obtained the "Sister Sledge" federal trademark in 2009. In 2012, Debbie and Joni voted to remove Kathy from using the Sister Sledge name, followed by Kim relinquishing her rights to the name. In 2013, Debbie and Joni sued Kathy for infringing on the trademark because it was used to advertise her solo performances. In the settlement agreement, Kathy agreed not to use the trademark "Sister Sledge" except as a "factually descriptive term". Further terms to the settlement agreement were not listed in online documents of the case.

By 2016, the trademark name lapsed again and failed to be renewed due to Joni's failing health in 2016. After Joni died in 2017, Debbie was left as the owner of Sister Sledge LLC. The same year, the trademark was successfully renewed through federal registration by Kathy. After Kathy proceeded to perform shows in the United States as "Sister Sledge", Debbie filed another lawsuit against Kathy in 2018, arguing that Kathy violated the settlement agreement of their previous lawsuit. However in May 2019, Kim and Kathy reinstated themselves as managers of Sister Sledge LLC and removed Debbie from her sole company manager role. They also resolved that any member of the group may use the "Sister Sledge" name for live performances.

In August 2023, Kathy filed a lawsuit against Debbie, arguing that her group Sister Sledge featuring Sledgendary are a false advertisement of Sister Sledge and that group creates market confusion due its lineup of its other members her [Debbie's] children, nephew and another performer are not company members of Sister Sledge LLC. Debbie filed a counterclaim, stating that a member of Sister Sledge LLC, she is a holder of the trademark name "Sister Sledge" and allowed to create the spinoff group Sledgendary. She further filed a counterclaim to invalidate Kathy's 2017 federal trademark registration. Both cases were dismissed by the United States District Judge Diane J. Humetewa. As of 2025, Kathy Sledge holds the rights to the trademark name "Sister Sledge".

== Legacy and recognition ==
"First time anybody had ever name checked fashion designers. We did that because we wanted Sister Sledge to be part of this new black movement which was called the Buppie movement, the black urban professions. We wanted Chic and Sister Sledge and everybody who was attached to us to be a part of that movement. So of course, they would know about fashion, of course they would understand the finer things."

— Nile Rodgers commenting on the impact of Sister Sledge

Sister Sledge have sold over 20 million records worldwide, making them one of the highest-selling female groups of the 1970s. In 2008, their song "We Are Family" was inducted into the Grammy Hall of Fame. In 2017, they were inducted into the Philadelphia Music Alliance Walk of Fame. Later that year, "We Are Family" was inducted into the National Recording Registry by the Library of Congress. In 2019, Sister Sledge were the recipients of the Timeless Icon Award at CineFashion Film Awards.

Sister Sledge are amongst the first group to namecheck different fashion designers in music. American Chic musician and music producer Nile Rodgers stated, "They didn't even know what we were talking about when we wrote the lyric 'Halston, Gucci, Fiorucci'. First time anybody had ever name checked fashion designers. Now in black music and pop music you can’t listen to a record without them saying 'Lamborghini' this and that. We did it one time! Once! Now it’s a thing."

Sister Sledge has been cited as a musical influence or source of inspiration by numerous musical acts, such as En Vogue, Spice Girls, TLC, and Destiny's Child.

== Members timeline ==
=== Original members ===
- Debbie Sledge (1965–1979, 1980–2008, 2009, 2011–2020)
- Kathy Sledge (1965–1989, 1993, 2000–2001, 2003, 2011)
- Kim Sledge (1965–2001, 2003, 2011, 2015–2019)
- Joni Sledge (1965–1993, 1994–2016) (died 2017)

=== Former touring members ===
- Carol Sledge (1977, 1979–1980)
- Camille Sledge (2003–2009, 2019–2020)
- Amber Sledge (2006–2009)
- Chele' Davis (2008–2010)
- Tanya Ti-et (2012–2015, 2016–2020)
- Julie Sledge (2018)

== Discography ==
=== Studio albums ===
- Circle of Love (1975)
- Together (1977)
- We Are Family (1979)
- Love Somebody Today (1980)
- All American Girls (1981)
- The Sisters (1982)
- Bet Cha Say That to All the Girls (1983)
- When the Boys Meet the Girls (1985)
- African Eyes (1998)
- Style (2003)

== See also ==
- List of artists who reached number one on the US Dance chart
- List of number-one dance hits (United States)
