= Thinking of You (Sister Sledge song) =

Single by Sister Sledge

from the album We Are Family
- B-side: "We are Family"; "He's the Greatest Dancer"
- Released: June 1984
- Recorded: 1978
- Studio: Power Station, New York City, New York, US
- Genre: Disco; funk; soul; R&B
- Length: 4:15 (single version); 4:31 (LP version)
- Label: Cotillion
- Songwriters: Nile Rodgers; Bernard Edwards
- Producers: Nile Rodgers; Bernard Edwards

Sister Sledge singles chronology
"All the Man That I Need" (1982)	"Thinking of You" (1984)	"Frankie" (1985)

Official audio
- "Thinking of You" on YouTube

"Thinking of You" is a song released as a single by American musical vocal group Sister Sledge in 1984 that became a hit in the UK. It was originally recorded for their third album, We Are Family (1979), and was included as the B-side to their UK top 20 single "Lost in Music". "Thinking of You" was written and produced by Nile Rodgers and Bernard Edwards, and, like many Sister Sledge hits, was built on the rhythmic foundations of their guitar and bass line arrangements.

== Chart performance ==
Sister Sledge's 1983 album Bet Cha Say That to All the Girls had failed to chart in any of the major territories. The belated issue in 1984 of "Thinking of You" peaked at number 11 on the UK Singles Chart and number 20 in Ireland, reviving interest in the group in both countries, paving the way for a re-issue of "Lost in Music" in September 1984, when it reached number four in the UK, and their only UK number one hit, "Frankie", in June 1985. "Thinking of You" was remixed in 1993 after the success of the "We Are Family" remix, reaching number 17 in the UK, number 21 in Ireland, and number 88 in Australia in 1994.

== Charts ==
=== Weekly charts ===
Chart (1984)	Peak position
Ireland (IRMA)	20
UK Singles (OCC)	11

Chart (1993–94)	Peak position
Australia (ARIA)	88
Europe (Eurochart Hot 100)	54
Ireland (IRMA)	21
UK Singles (OCC)	17
UK Airplay (Music Week)	15
UK Club Chart (Music Week)	1

=== Year-end charts ===
Chart (1984)	Position
UK Singles (Gallup)	81

== Certifications ==
Region	Certification	Certified units/sales
New Zealand (RMNZ)	Gold	15,000^{‡}
United Kingdom (BPI)	Gold	400,000^{‡}
^{‡} Sales+streaming figures based on certification alone.

== Cover versions ==
2 Brothers on the 4th Floor, a Dutch rap duo, released a cover version in 1997 titled "I'm Thinkin' of U".

Australian singer Lisa Maxwell also covered "Thinking of You" on her album Wish in 1997 (NZ number 50 and Japan's J-Wave chart number eight.)

Blacknuss (featuring vocals by Nai-Jee-Ria) released a house version of the song in 2000.

Paul Weller covered this song on his 2004 album, Studio 150. This version made number 18 in the UK and later appeared on the 2005 Echo compilation album by various artists, Acoustic 05.

Scottish pop singer Joesef released a cover of the song in 2020 for Spotify's Singles x Pride campaign.

== In popular culture ==
In 2020, the Dimitri from Paris mix became one of the theme songs to D-Nice's Club Quarantine DJ sets on Instagram Live.
