= Love Somebody Today =

Studio album by Sister Sledge
- Released: March 16, 1980
- Recorded: November 1979 – February 1980
- Studios: Power Station, New York City
- Genres: R&B; disco; pop; soul
- Length: 38:44
- Label: Cotillion
- Producers: Nile Rodgers; Bernard Edwards

Sister Sledge chronology
We Are Family (1979)	Love Somebody Today (1980)	All American Girls (1981)

Singles from Love Somebody Today
- 1. "Got to Love Somebody" Released: December 18, 1979; 2. "Reach Your Peak" Released: March 12, 1980; 3. "Let's Go on Vacation" Released: June 1980; 4. "Easy Street" Released: 1980

Love Somebody Today is the fourth album by the American vocal group Sister Sledge. It was released on March 16, 1980, by Cotillion Records.

The album saw the return of Chic musicians Bernard Edwards and Nile Rodgers, who produced several disco, R&B and soul songs. Love Somebody Today also featured several different vocal arrangements. Kathy Sledge sings lead on half of the album, while the remaining songs are led by other sisters.

Love Somebody Today was promoted in mid-1980 by television performances and concert tours, such as Sister Sledge's headlining European tour. The album received moderately positive reviews by music critics. It was their second album to peak within the Top 10 on the US Top Soul LP's chart. The album spawned four singles–"Got to Love Somebody", "Reach Your Peak", "Let's Go on Vacation", and "Easy Street". Love Somebody Today was the group's final album to feature disco music, as the genre began to decline in popularity.

== Recording and production ==
Sister Sledge began recording the album in November 1979. Wanting to capitalize off of the success of their previous album and continue their success in disco music, Cotillion Records brought in Chic musicians Bernard Edwards and Nile Rodgers once again to produce Sister Sledge's album. Other Chic members Alfa Anderson, Luci Martin, and Fonzi Thornton were also brought in to provide background vocals on the album. They recorded the album at Power Station in New York City.

== Release and promotion ==
Following the release of the lead single and title track "Got to Love Somebody", Sister Sledge performed the song on several televised shows including Discoring, Soul Train, Top of the Pops, and TopPop; where they announced their upcoming album. Love Somebody Today was released by Cotillion Records on March 16, 1980.

In mid-1980, Sister Sledge performed "Reach Your Peak" on NBC's The Big Show. During their European Tour, they performed song on Dutch music shows Plattenküche and TopPop. In 2007, Love Somebody Today was remastered and reissued by Warner Bros. Records.

=== Singles ===
"Got to Love Somebody" was released as the album's lead single on December 18, 1979. "Got to Love Somebody" peaked at 64 on the Billboard Hot 100. The song was more successful on the US Hot Soul Singles chart, peaking at number 6. It also peaked at number 34 on the US Disco chart. The accompanying music video for "Got to Love Somebody" premiered on several television shows.

On March 12, 1980, they released "Reach Your Peak" as the second single. The pop-genre song features Joni Sledge on lead vocals. Despite heavy promotion and televised performances, the song was commercially less successful than its predecessor, only peaking at number 21 on the Hot Soul Singles chart. "Let's Go on Vacation", led by Debbie Sledge, was released as the album's third single and failed to make Top 40 on any chart, only peaking at 63 on the Hot Soul Singles chart. Despite releasing "Easy Street", a disco song led by Kim, as the album's final single, it failed to chart as disco began to decline in late 1980.

== Critical reception ==
Professional ratings
Review scores
Source	Rating
AllMusic	3/5 stars
Robert Christgau	B+
Smash Hits	7/10
The Tuscaloosa News	4/5 stars

Music critic Amy Hanson of AllMusic compared the album to its predecessor We Are Family and remarked, "much of Love Somebody Today sounds flat in comparison. But still, the sounds of Sister Sledge at the peak of their star power are better than much of the pap that passed for pop at the time." Dave Marsh of The Tuscaloosa News gave the album a four-star rating, stating that the album's "combination of the Sisters' exhilarating vocal interplay and the sophisticated production of Chic's Bernard Edwards and Nile Rodgers results in some pretty nice pop-soul confections."

== Commercial performance ==
Love Somebody Today peaked at number 31 on the US Billboard 200. It peaked at number 7 on the Top Soul LP's chart. The album remained on the charts for over nineteen weeks, gradually moving down several positions each week until ultimately dropping off the charts.

== Track listing ==
All songs written by Bernard Edwards and Nile Rodgers.

1. "Got to Love Somebody" – 6:53
2. "You Fooled Around" – 4:28
3. "I'm a Good Girl" – 4:11
4. "Easy Street" – 4:34
5. "Reach Your Peak" – 4:55
6. "Pretty Baby" – 4:03
7. "How to Love" – 4:32
8. "Let's Go on Vacation" – 5:08

== Personnel ==
Sister Sledge

- Kathy Sledge – lead vocals (1, 2, 6, 7)
- Joni Sledge – lead vocals (3, 5, 6)
- Kim Sledge – lead vocals (4, 6)
- Debbie Sledge – lead vocals (6, 8)

with:

- Alfa Anderson – backing vocals
- Michelle Cobbs – backing vocals
- Luci Martin – backing vocals
- Fonzi Thornton – backing vocals
- Nile Rodgers – guitar
- Raymond Jones – keyboards, Fender Rhodes
- Andy Schwartz – keyboards, Fender Rhodes electric piano
- Robert Sabino – piano, Hohner clavinet
- Bernard Edwards – bass guitar
- Tony Thompson – drums
- Sammy Figueroa – percussion
- Eddie Daniels – saxophone
- Meco Monardo – tenor saxophone
- Jon Faddis – trumpet
- Ellen Seeling – trumpet
- Bob Milliken – trombone
- The Chic Strings:
  - Marianne Carroll – strings
  - Cheryl Hong – strings
  - Karen Milne – strings
- Gene Orloff – concertmaster

== Production ==
- Bernard Edwards – producer for Chic Organization Ltd.
- Nile Rodgers – producer for Chic Organization Ltd.
- Bob Clearmountain – sound engineer
- Bill Scheniman – engineer
- Larry Alexander – engineer
- Garry Rindfuss – assistant engineer
- Jeff Hendrickson – assistant engineer
- Peter Robbins – assistant engineer
- Ray Willard – assistant engineer
- Joe Gastwirt – mastering
- All songs recorded and mixed at Power Station Studios, New York
