= Together (Sister Sledge album) =

Studio album by Sister Sledge
- Released: August 9, 1977
- Recorded: September 1976 – April 1977
- Studio: Power Station, New York City
- Genre: Disco; R&B; soul; funk
- Length: 48:16
- Label: Cotillion
- Producer: Michael Kunze; Sylvester Levay

Sister Sledge chronology
Circle of Love (1975)	Together (1977)	We Are Family (1979)

Singles from Together
- 1. "Blockbuster Boy" Released: May 26, 1977; 2. "Baby, It's the Rain" Released: November 1977; 3. "As (Promo 12")" Released: November 1977

Professional ratings
Review scores
Source	Rating
AllMusic	3/5 stars
The Rolling Stone Album Guide	2/5 stars

Together is the second studio album by the American R&B vocal group Sister Sledge, released on August 9, 1977, by Cotillion Records. The album was the group's first release on the Cotillion label after parting from Atco Records.

== Background ==
Following two unsuccessful non-album singles in 1976 for the sisters, Cotillion paired them up with Silver Convention's Sylvester Levay and Michael Kunze in the search for a hit. Although only 4 recordings had initially been planned, Cotillion eventually decided to turn it into a full LP. The sisters flew to Munich to record the album, consisting of 6 Levay/Kunze-compositions of which they had previously recorded "Baby It's the Rain" with Ramona Wulf (1975), "Hands Full of Nothing" with Jerry Rix (1976). "My Favourite Song" had initially been recorded (but never released) by Silver Convention and submitted as one of three choices for their Eurovision Song Contest 1977 entry for Germany ("Telegram" was eventually chosen). 3 tunes were contributed by Kathy & Joni Sledge, and finally there were 3 cover versions - 2 Stevie Wonder songs, "As" and "I Was Made to Love Him", and Lee Dorsey's "Sneakin' Sally Through the Alley".

"Blockbuster Boy" was the first single released late May 1977 prior to the album's release. It could only muster an R&B charting at #61. "Baby, It's The Rain" followed as the second single in November but failed to chart altogether. The sisters would make an appearance on Soul train December 24, 1977, performing "Baby, It's The Rain" and "As" which had been released on a promotional 12" disco single by Atlantic Records.

Disappointed with the continued lack of success, the sisters released another flop single "I've Seen Better Days" in 1978 before teaming up with Chic for their third album, We Are Family.

== Track listing ==
1. "Blockbuster Boy" (Kunze, Levay) – 3:56
2. "Do the Funky Do" (Don Freeman, Kathy Sledge) – 4:33
3. "I Was Made to Love Him" (Henry Cosby, Lula Mae Hardaway, Sylvia Moy, Stevie Wonder) – 3:04
4. "Hold On to This Feeling" (Joni Sledge) – 4:01
5. "As" (Stevie Wonder) – 4:56
6. "Sneaking Sally Through the Alley" (Allen Toussaint) – 3:32
7. "Funky Family" (Kunze, Levay) – 4:19
8. "Baby, It's the Rain" (Kunze, Levay) – 3:34
9. "Can't Mess Around with Love" (Kathy Sledge) – 4:15
10. "My Favorite Song" (Kunze, Levay) – 3:45
11. "Hands Full of Nothing" (Kunze, Levay) – 4:05
12. "Moondancer" (Kunze, Levay) – 4:16

== Personnel ==
Sister Sledge

- Kathy Sledge – lead vocals, backing vocals
- Debbie Sledge – lead vocals, backing vocals
- Joni Sledge – lead vocals, backing vocals
- Kim Sledge – lead vocals, backing vocals

with:

- Siegfried "Sigi" Schwab – guitar
- Nick Woodland – guitar
- Sylvester Levay – keyboards, saxophone, arrangements
- Gary Unwin – bass
- Martin Harrison – drums
- Joseph Spector – percussion
- Gabor Kristof – trumpet
- Georges Delagaye – trombone
- Dino Solera – flute
- Fritz Sonnleitner and His Friends – strings

== Charts ==
=== Singles ===
Year	Single	Chart positions
Year	Single	US R&B
1977	"Blockbuster Boy"	61
