= Freak Out: The Greatest Hits of Chic and Sister Sledge =

Greatest hits album by Chic & Sister Sledge
- Released: 1988
- Recorded: 1973–1987
- Genre: Disco; funk; R&B; jazz; samba
- Label: Atlantic
- Producer: Various

Freak Out: The Greatest Hits of Chic and Sister Sledge is a greatest hits album of recordings by American R&B bands Chic and Sister Sledge, released by Atlantic Records in 1988. The compilation was one of the first to be released on Compact Disc, and includes remixes of "We Are Family" and "Lost In Music" (by Bernard Edwards and Nile Rodgers themselves) and "Le Freak" (by Stock Aitken Waterman/PWL's Phil Harding).

== Track listing ==
All tracks written by Bernard Edwards and Nile Rodgers unless otherwise noted.

1. Chic: "Le Freak" (7" Edit) - 3:32
2. Chic: "I Want Your Love" (7" Edit) - 3:21
3. Sister Sledge: "He's the Greatest Dancer" (7" Edit) - 4:08
4. Chic: "Everybody Dance" (7" Edit) (Bernard Edwards, Kenny Lehman, Nile Rodgers) - 4:00
5. Sister Sledge: "We Are Family" (Bernard Edwards 1984 Remix, 7" Edit) - 3:21
6. Sister Sledge: "Thinking of You" - 4:20
7. Chic: "My Forbidden Lover" - 4:42
8. Sister Sledge: "All American Girls" (7" Edit) (Narada Michael Walden, Lisa Walden, Allee Willis, Joni Sledge) - 4:42
9. Sister Sledge: "Lost in Music" (Bernard Edwards & Nile Rodgers 1984 Remix, 7" Edit) - 4:41
10. Sister Sledge: "Frankie" (Denise Rich) - 3:54
11. Chic: "Good Times" (7" Edit) - 3:57
12. Sister Sledge: "Mama Never Told Me" (Phil Hurtt, Anthony Bell) - 3:18
13. Chic: "Dance, Dance, Dance (Yowsah, Yowsah, Yowsah)" (7" Edit) (Bernard Edwards, Kenny Lehman, Nile Rodgers) - 3:41
14. Chic: "My Feet Keep Dancing" (7" Edit) - 4:16
15. Sister Sledge: "Got To Love Somebody" (7" Edit) - 3:35
16. Chic: "Jack Le Freak" ("Le Freak" 1987 Remix, 7" Edit) - 4:37

== Production ==
- Bernard Edwards - producer for Chic Organization Ltd.
- Nile Rodgers - producer for Chic Organization Ltd.
- Kenny Lehman - co-producer (tracks 4 & 13)
- Narada Michael Walden - producer (track 8)
- LeBaron Taylor, Phil Hurtt, Anthony Bell (The Young Professionals) - producers (track 12)
- Phil Harding - mix, post-production (track 16)
- Ian Curnow - mix, post production/programming (track 16)
