= The Sisters (album) =

Studio album by Sister Sledge
- Released: January 18, 1982
- Recorded: 1981
- Studios: Starship, Sigma Sound Studios, Philadelphia, Pennsylvania
- Genres: R&B; disco
- Length: 42:27
- Label: Cotillion
- Producer: Sister Sledge

Sister Sledge chronology
All American Girls (1981)	The Sisters (1982)	Bet Cha Say That to All the Girls (1983)

Professional ratings
Review scores
Source	Rating
AllMusic	2.5/5 stars
Smash Hits	8½/10

The Sisters is the sixth studio album by American R&B vocal group Sister Sledge, released in 1982 by Cotillion Records. The album is the group's first self-production. It contains a remake of the Mary Wells hit "My Guy". The Sisters peaked at No. 14 on the Top R&B/Hip-Hop Albums chart as well as No. 69 on the Billboard 200 chart.

== Track listing ==
1. "Super Bad Sisters" (Art Austin, Robert Allen, Debbie Sledge Young, Joni Sledge, Kathy Sledge Lightfoot, Kim Sledge) – 4:38
2. "My Guy" (William "Smokey" Robinson Jr.) – 3:46
3. "Lightfootin'" (Kathy Sledge Lightfoot, Phillip Lightfoot) – 3:59
4. "My Special Way" (Mark Moulin) – 5:03
5. "Grandma" (Art Austin, Robert Allen) – 3:50
6. "Get You in Our Love" (Michael Clark) – 3:53
7. "Il Mácquillage Lady" (Joni Sledge) – 3:57
8. "Everybody's Friend" (Kathy Sledge Lightfoot, Timothy J. Tobias) – 4:33
9. "All the Man I Need" (Dean Pitchford, Michael Gore) – 4:41
10. "Jacki's Theme: There's No Stopping Us" (Carol Conners, William Goldstein) – 4:07
- Note: The song, "All the Man That I Need", would go on to be re-recorded (in a shortened, re-arranged version) by Whitney Houston, and would become an across-the-board smash hit in America, reaching the top spot on the Billboard Hot 100, the Adult Contemporary, the Hot R&B/Hip-Hop Songs and the Cash Box Hot 100. Houston's spin on the song nixes the guitar solo, opting instead for a screaming sax break by Kenny G.

== Personnel ==
Sister Sledge

- Kathy Sledge Lightfoot – lead vocals (2, 3, 6, 9), vocals (all)
- Joni Sledge – lead vocals (4, 7), vocals (all)
- Debbie Sledge Young – lead vocals (8), vocals (all)
- Kim Sledge – vocals (all)

with:

- James Williams, Kenneth Williams – rap (1)
- David Simmons – additional vocals (9)
- Nick Mundy – rhythm guitar (1–9), lead guitar (2, 5, 7–9)
- James "Herb" Smith – lead & rhythm guitar (10)
- Steve Gold – keyboards, synthesizer (1, 5)
- Jack Ebbert – keyboards (2, 4, 6, 9)
- Timothy J. Tobias – keyboards (8)
- Nathaniel Wilkie – keyboards (10)
- Robert (Bob) Allen – bass (1, 3, 5)
- Jimmy Williams – bass (2, 4, 6–8)
- Howard (CJ) Clark – bass (9)
- Jimmy "Funky" Williams – bass (10)
- Darryl Birgee – drums (1, 2–9)
- Phillip Lightfoot – drums (3, 10), electronic drums (10)
- Drew Henderson – percussion (1–8)
- Larry Washington – percussion (10)

== Production ==
- Arranged by Phillip Lightfoot (co-arrangement on track 3), Sister Sledge (all)
- Produced by Sister Sledge
- Horns & strings arranged by Jack Faith (1, 5), Jack Ebbert (2, 6, 9), Roscoe Gill (4)
- Recording engineers: Arthur Stoppe, Dirk Devlin, Jim Gallagher, Joe Tarcia, Peter Humpheys
- Assistant recording engineers: Joe Bees, John Wisner, Michael Tarcia, Michael Spitz, Scott MacMin, Vince Warsavage
- Tracks 2, 7 and 8 mixed by Power Station Studios (New York City) by Scott Litt; assisted by Malcolm Pollack
- All other tracks mixed at Sigma Sound Studios (Philadelphia) by Joe Tarsia; Tarsia is also responsible for re-mixing all tracks
- Art direction by Bob Defrin
- Photography by Harry Langdon

== In popular culture ==
- CBS Sports used "Jacki's Theme: There's No Stopping Us" as the theme for its highlights of the 1982 NCAA Division I men's basketball tournament following the championship game.
- Daft Punk sampled "Il Macquillage Lady" for their track "Aerodynamic", from the album Discovery.
