= Bet Cha Say That to All the Girls =

Bet Cha Say That to All The Girls

Studio album by Sister Sledge
- Released: April 18, 1983
- Recorded: 1982
- Studios: Record Plant, Los Angeles, California; Le Gonks West, West Hollywood, California; Lion Share, Los Angeles, California
- Genres: R&B; soul; disco; funk
- Length: 39:50
- Label: Cotillion
- Producer: George Duke

Sister Sledge chronology
The Sisters (1982)	Bet Cha Say That to All The Girls (1983)	When The Boys Meet The Girls (1985)

Singles from Bet Cha Say That to All The Girls
- 1. "B.Y.O.B (Bring Your Own Baby)" Released: 1983; 2. "Gotta Get Back to Love" Released: 1983; 3. "Thank You for the Party" Released: 1983

Professional ratings
Review scores
Source	Rating
AllMusic	2/5 stars

Bet Cha Say That to All The Girls is the seventh studio album by American R&B and pop girl group Sister Sledge. It was released in 1983 on the Cotillion Records label. Singles from the album included "B.Y.O.B (Bring Your Own Baby)", "Gotta Get Back to Love", "Thank You for the Party". The album peaked at number 169 on the Billboard 200 chart and number 35 on the Top R&B Albums chart in 1983.

== Track listing ==
Side A
No.	Title	Writer(s)	Length
1.	"B.Y.O.B (Bring Your Own Baby)"	Michael Garvin; Tom Shapiro	3:46
2.	"Lifetime Lover"	Derek Graves; Sister Sledge	4:30
3.	"Once in Your Life"	Jay Levy; Terry Shaddick	3:43
4.	"Shake Me Down"	Crystal Blake; David Paul Bryant; Mitch Kaplan; Peter Rafeson	4:15
5.	"Dream On"	Geoff Leib; John Keller	4:00
Total length:			19:34

Side B
No.	Title	Writer(s)	Length
1.	"Let Him Go"	George Duke	3:50
2.	"Smile"	Kathy Sledge Lightfoot; Phil Lightfoot	5:10
3.	"Bet Cha Say That to All the Girls"	David "Hawk" Wolinski	4:21
4.	"Gotta Get Back to Love"	Kerry Hatch; Tom Kelly	3:39
5.	"Thank You for the Party"	Dominic Bugatti; Frank Musker	3:56
Total length:			20:16

== Charts ==
Chart (1983)	Peak position
US Billboard Top LPs & Tape	169
US Billboard Black LPs	35

== Personnel ==
Personnel adapted from liner notes.

Sister Sledge

- Kathy Sledge Lightfoot – Lead vocals (tracks 1, 2, 4, 6–10)
- Joni Sledge – Lead vocals (tracks 2, 8)
- Debbie Sledge Young – Lead vocals (tracks 2, 3)
- Kim Sledge – Lead vocals (tracks 2, 5)

with:

- Al Jarreau – rap (track 8)
- Jeffrey Osborne – backing vocals (track 10)
- George Duke – keyboards, LinnDrum, Linn LM-1
- Charles Fearing – guitar (track 2)
- Peter Rafelson – guitar (track 4)
- Mike Sembello – guitar
- Louis Johnson – bass
- Freddie Washington – bass (tracks 1, 6)
- Nathan Watts – bass (track 2)
- David Paul Bryant – Moog bass (track 4)
- Ricky Lawson – drums
- Paulinho Da Costa – percussion
- Larry Williams – flute, tenor & baritone saxophone
- Ronnie Laws– soprano saxophone (track 3)
- Gary Grant, Jerry Hey – trumpet & flugelhorn
- Lou McGreary – trombone, bass trombone
- Dorothy Remsen – harp
- Assa Dori, Brenton B. Banks, George Kast, Gerald Vinci, Irma Neumann, Joy Lyle, Marylin R. Graham, Reg Hill, Robert Shushel, Sherril C. Baptist, Stuart V. Canin, Thomas R. Buffum – violin
- Allan Harshman, David Schwartz, Rollice E. Dale, Samuel Boghosian – viola
- Barbara Hunter, Earl S. Madison, Frederick Seykora, Raymond S. Kelley – cello

Production

- Producer: George Duke
- Assistant producer: Cheryl R. Brown
- Vocal arrangements by George Duke & Sister Sledge
- Horn arrangements by George Duke (tracks: A5, B3) & Jerry Hey (tracks: A1 to A4, B1, B2, B4, B5)
- Strings conductor & string arrangements: George Del Barrio
- Strings contractor: Bill Hughes
- Recording & remix engineer: Tommy Vicari
- Additional engineering: Erik Zobler
