= All American Girls =

Studio album by Sister Sledge
- Released: February 2, 1981
- Recorded: September 1980 – January 1981
- Studio: The Automatt, San Francisco, California; Davlen, North Hollywood, California; Power Station, New York City
- Genre: R&B; soul; funk; pop; disco
- Length: 40:04
- Label: Cotillion
- Producer: Narada Michael Walden; Sister Sledge

Sister Sledge chronology
Love Somebody Today (1980)	All American Girls (1981)	The Sisters (1982)

Singles from All American Girls
- 1. "All American Girls" Released: January 30, 1981; 2. "Next Time You'll Know" Released: April 24, 1981; 3. "If You Really Want Me" Released: May 8, 1981; 4. "He's Just a Runaway" Released: June 30, 1981

Professional ratings
Review scores
Source	Rating
AllMusic	3/5 stars

All American Girls is the fifth studio album by the American R&B vocal group Sister Sledge, released on February 2, 1981, by Cotillion Records. Unlike their previous albums, the group served as co–producers, with Kathy Sledge and Joni Sledge writing the songs.

== Background ==
Released in February 1981, this album was aimed at breaking Sister Sledge out of the disco sound that had launched them to popularity; consequentially, the group chose not to work with their frequent collaborators Nile Rodgers or Bernard Edwards. Instead, Narada Michael Walden was hired. Four singles were released, all of which showcased a post-disco influence.

The first single and biggest hit from the album was "All American Girls", written by songwriter Allee Willis along with Joni Sledge and Narada Michael Walden's then–wife Lisa Walden. Released in January 1981, The song peaked at number three on the R&B/Soul charts and 79 on the Hot 100 charts in late–March 1981. It was also a Top 10 hit in the Low Countries, reaching number eight in The Netherlands and number six in Belgium. It also charted in Germany (#27) and the UK (#41).

The follow–up single was "Next Time You'll Know" which was released in April 1981. The single peaked at number 82 on the Hot 100 charts by mid–May 1981. In August 1981, the third single "If You Really Want Me" written by the youngest member Kathy Sledge was released, and "He's Just a Runaway" in late 1981.

== Track listing ==
1. "All American Girls" (Allee Willis, Joni Sledge, Lisa Walden) – 4:42
2. "He's Just a Runaway" (Narada Michael Walden, Allee Willis) – 3:57
3. "If You Really Want Me" (Narada Michael Walden, Kathy Sledge) – 4:37
4. "Next Time You'll Know" (Narada Michael Walden, Allee Willis) – 3:57
5. "Happy Feeling" (Narada Michael Walden, Gary Cooke, Kathy Sledge) – 3:35
6. "Ooh, You Caught My Heart" (Allee Willis, Narada Michael Walden) – 4:25
7. "Make a Move" (Bob Allen, Joni Sledge) – 3:47
8. "Don't Let Me Lose It" (Narada Michael Walden, Allee Willis) – 2:53
9. "Music Makes Me Feel Good" (Phillip Lightfoot, Kathy Sledge) – 4:29
10. "I Don't Want to Say Goodbye" (Narada Michael Walden, Jeffrey Cohen) – 3:39

== Personnel ==
Sister Sledge

- Kathy Sledge – lead vocals (1, 2, 3, 4, 6, 8, 9)
- Joni Sledge – lead vocals (7)
- Kim Sledge – lead vocals (10)
- Debbie Sledge – lead vocals (5)

with:

- Bob Castell-Blanch – guitar
- Frank Martin – keyboards
- Randy Jackson – bass guitar
- Narada Michael Walden – drums
- The See America Horns:
  - Marc Russo – saxophone
  - Dave Grover – trumpet, trombone
  - Bill Lamb – trumpet, trombone
  - Wayne Wallace – trombone

== Production ==
- Narada Michael Walden – producer
- Sister Sledge – co–producer
- Bob Clearmountain – sound engineer
- Humberto Gatica – engineer
- Ken "Kessanova" Kessie – engineer
- David Greenberg – assistant engineer
- Laertes "Doc" Muldrow – assistant engineer
- Maureen Droney – assistant engineer
- Bob Ludwig – mastering
- All songs recorded and mixed at The Automatt, Davlen Studios & Power Station
