= Circle of Love (Sister Sledge album) =

Studio album by Sister Sledge
- Released: January 29, 1975
- Recorded: October, 1974–January, 1975
- Studio: Mediasound, New York City, New York
- Genre: R&B; soul; funk; disco
- Length: 33:35
- Label: Atco
- Producer: Bert DeCoteaux; Tony Silvester

Sister Sledge chronology
Circle of Love (1975)	Together (1977)

Singles from Together
- 1. "Love Don't You Go Through No Changes on Me" Released: February 23, 1975; 2. "Circle of Love (Caught in the Middle)" Released: April 8, 1975

Professional ratings
Review scores
Source	Rating
AllMusic	3/5 stars
The Rolling Stone Album Guide	2/5 stars

Circle of Love is the debut studio album by the American vocal group Sister Sledge, released in 1975 by Atco Records. Featuring Kathy Sledge on vocals, the album includes the songs "Circle of Love (Caught in the Middle)" and "Love Don't Go Through No Changes on Me". The album was described as a mix of pop and soul in a 1975 Billboard Magazine review.

== Background ==
At the time of this release, all members of the group were still teenagers; the oldest member Debbie Sledge was nineteen years old, studying at Tyler College of Art, Joni Sledge was an eighteen-year-old college freshman at Temple University, Kim Sledge was in her senior year of high school at Olney High School in their hometown of Philadelphia; and the youngest, Kathy, was a 15-year-old 10th–grader. This album gained moderate commercial success, Their single "Love Don't You Go Through No Changes on Me", reached number thirty–one on the Hot R&B/Soul Singles charts by mid 1975. The song was performed along with "Circle of Love (Caught in the Middle)" on an episode of Soul Train, which aired in April 1975.

== Track listing ==
All tracks composed by Gwen Guthrie and Haras Fyre (pen name: Patrick Grant); except where indicated:

1. "Circle of Love (Caught in the Middle)" (Fay Hauser, Patrick Adams) – 3:30
2. "Cross My Heart" – 3:22
3. "Protect Our Love" – 4:10
4. "Give In to Love" (Linda Creed, Thom Bell) – 4:55
5. "Love Don't You Go Through No Changes On Me" – 3:24
6. "Don't You Miss Him Now" – 3:15
7. "Pain Reliever" – 3:30
8. "You're Much Better Off Loving Me" – 3:17
9. "Fireman" (Guthrie, Fyre/Grant, Charles Sampson) – 3:40

== Personnel ==
- Debbie Sledge, Joni Sledge, Kathy Sledge, Kim Sledge – vocals
- Bert "Super Charts" DeCoteaux – arrangements, conductor
- Bob Defrin – art direction
- Bob Babbitt, Haras Fyre (as Patrick Grant) – bass guitar
- Billy King, Carlos Martin – bongos
- Kermit Moore, Seymour Barab – cello
- Billy King, Carlos Martin – congos
- Jimmy Young – drums
- Bob Clearmountain, Tony Bongiovi – engineer
- Ellen Libman, Ron St. Germain – assistant engineer
- Donald Corrado, Jim Buffington – French horn
- Jeff Mironov, Jerry Friedman, John Tropea – guitar
- Derek Smith, Pat Rebillot, Ricky Hughric – keyboards
- Dennis King – mastering
- David Carey, George Devens, Joe Venuto, Phil Kraus – percussion
- Armen Kachaturian – cover photography
- Buzz Brauner, Frank Wess, George Marge – reeds, woodwind
- Al Cobbs, Alan Raph, Garnett Brown, Jack Jeffers – trombone
- Ernie Royal, James Sedlar, Jimmy Owens – trumpet
- Alfred Brown, Julien Barber, Seymour Berman – viola
- Gene Orloff, Harold Kohon, Irving Spice, Isadora Kohon, Louis Haber, Louis Stone, Michael Comins, Noel DaCosta, Sanford Allen – violin
