= When the Boys Meet the Girls (album) =

Studio album by Sister Sledge
- Released: June 7, 1985
- Studio: The Power Station, New York City; Record Plant, Los Angeles; Atlantic Studios, New York City
- Genre: R&B
- Length: 42:02
- Label: Atlantic
- Producer: Nile Rodgers

Sister Sledge chronology
Bet Cha Say That to All the Girls (1983)	When the Boys Meet the Girls (1985)	And Now…Sledge…Again (1992)

Singles from When the Boys Meet the Girls
- 1. "Frankie" Released: May 1985; 2. "Dancing on the Jagged Edge" Released: August 10, 1985

Professional ratings
Review scores
Source	Rating
AllMusic	2.5/5 stars

When the Boys Meet the Girls is the eighth studio album by the American R&B vocal group Sister Sledge, released on June 7, 1985, by Atlantic Records, their first release on that label.

== Background ==
Prior to this album, the group's releases had been released under the Cotillion label, a subsidiary of Atlantic which became defunct in 1985. Produced by Nile Rodgers, this album reached number nineteen on the UK charts. The two singles released from this album charted in the UK; "Frankie", released in June 1985 peaked at number one and spent seventeen weeks on the charts. The single was later certified gold by the BPI in July 1985. The other single, "Dancing on the Jagged Edge", released in August 1985, peaked at number 50 in the UK.

== Track listing ==
1. "When the Boys Meet the Girls" (Mary Unobsky, Danny Irinstone) – 5:26
2. "Dancing on the Jagged Edge" (David Bryant, Dennis Herring, Lorelei McBroom) – 5:44
3. "Frankie" (Joy Denny) – 4:17
4. "You're Fine" (Dave Conley, Bernard Jackson, David Townsend) – 5:21
5. "Hold Out Poppy" (Kathy Sledge, Charles Kelly) – 3:56
6. "The Boy Most Likely" (Nile Rodgers) – 4:12
7. "You Need Me" (Kathy Sledge, Tony Maiden) – 4:47
8. "Following the Leader" (Kathy Sledge, Philip Lightfoot) – 5:02
9. "Peer Pressure" (Joni Sledge, Tony Maiden) – 3:19

== Personnel ==
=== Musicians ===
Sister Sledge

- Kathy Sledge Lightfoot – vocals
- Joni Sledge – vocals
- Debbie Sledge Young – vocals
- Kim Sledge – vocals

with:

- Nile Rodgers – guitar; Synclavier (tracks 1, 2, 4, 6), vocals (track 4), Roland Juno-60 synthesizer (tracks 6, 8), bass (tracks 6, 7)
- Herbie Hancock – Yamaha DX7 (track 5)
- Raymond Jones – piano (track 9), Yamaha DX7 & Oberheim OB-8 synthesizers (tracks 2, 3, 9)
- Rob Sabino – Yamaha DX7 bass (tracks 1, 2, 4), Prophet-5 synthesizer (tracks 3, 7), Prophet-7 synthesizer (track 1)
- James Farber – Synclavier bass (track 8)
- Tommy "Rock" Jymi (alias Nile Rodgers) – bass & Synclavier piano (track 8)
- Jimmy Bralower – drums & percussion
- Mac Gollehon – trumpet (tracks 2–4, 6 7)
- The Borneo Horns:
  - Stan Harrison – alto saxophone (track 7)
  - Lenny Pickett – flute, tenor saxophone solo (track 7)
  - Steve Elson – flute, baritone saxophone (track 7)
- Horns arranged and conducted by Nile Rodgers
- Synclavier programming by Kevin Jones

== Production ==
- Recorded and mixed by James Farber
- Sound engineer – Eric Mohler
- Additional engineering by Malcolm Pollack and Bobby Warner
- Additional second engineers – Eddie Delena, Garry Rindfuss and Ira McLaughlin
- Production managers – Budd Tunick & Kevin Jones
- Art direction by Bob Defrin
- Photography by Roy Volkmann
- Recorded and mixed at Power Station, New York
- Additional recording at Record Plant, L.A., California and Atlantic Studios, N.Y.
