= We Are Family (song) =

1979 single by Sister Sledge

- Side A of US 7-inch single

Single by Sister Sledge

from the album We Are Family
- B-side: "Easier to Love"
- Released: April 1979
- Studio: Power Station, New York City, New York, US
- Genre: Disco; R&B; soul
- Length: 8:19 (12-inch/album version); 3:36 (single version)
- Label: Cotillion
- Songwriters: Bernard Edwards; Nile Rodgers
- Producers: Nile Rodgers; Bernard Edwards

Sister Sledge singles chronology
"He's the Greatest Dancer" (1979)	"We Are Family" (1979)	"Lost in Music" (1979)

Music video
- "We Are Family" on YouTube

"We Are Family" is a song recorded by American sibling vocal group Sister Sledge. Composed by Bernard Edwards and Nile Rodgers, they both offered the song to Atlantic Records; although the record label initially declined, the track was released in April 1979 as a single from the album of the same name (1979) and began to gain club and radio play, eventually becoming the group's signature song.

"We Are Family" went gold, becoming the number one R&B and number two pop song on the American charts in 1979 (behind "Hot Stuff" by Donna Summer). Along with the tracks "He's the Greatest Dancer" and "Lost in Music", "We Are Family" reached number one on the Billboard Dance Club Songs. It has been re-released two times in new remixes; in 1984 and 1993. In 2017, the song was selected for preservation in the National Recording Registry by the Library of Congress as being "culturally, historically, or aesthetically significant". Billboard magazine named the song number 20 on their list of "100 Greatest Girl Group Songs of All Time" same year. In 2023, the magazine included it in their "Best Pop Songs of All Time".

== Origins and meaning ==
"We Are Family" was the first song that Nile Rodgers and Bernard Edwards wrote for any act other than their own band Chic. After their first hit, "Dance, Dance, Dance (Yowsah, Yowsah, Yowsah)", Atlantic Records President Jerry L. Greenberg encouraged the pair to write and produce for other acts on the label. However, Rodgers and Edwards did not feel confident enough to work with big, established recording artists and performers. They also felt that if they worked as Greenberg had suggested, the label would not give them proper credit for their work. To build up their reputation, the pair asked Greenberg to let them work with the least established act he had signed; if they got a hit record, then they could take on the challenge of writing for someone bigger.

According to Rodgers, the verses were mostly verbatim based on how Greenberg described Sister Sledge to him and Edwards when first commissioning the work. Rodgers/Edwards then simply walked immediately to the studio, rearranged their notes from the meeting into lyrics, and wrote a song melody underneath them. The chorus (and therefore the title) makes reference to the fact that the group are the four sisters of a family, and sought to reintroduce the group to mainstream audiences after their two unsuccessful prior albums.

The song has since gone on to be used more generally as an expression of solidarity in various contexts, as the anthem of the We Are Family Foundation, which is named after it. The lead vocals were recorded in a single take by then-19-year-old Kathy Sledge.

In an episode of the Deep Hidden Meaning podcast, Rodgers claims that Sister Sledge wanted to re-record the song with changed lyrics, but he refused to release his consent. No more detail is provided.

== Critical reception ==
=== Original version ===
American magazine Billboard wrote that "We Are Family" has "an upbeat, catchy melody" and "heavy bass, funky guitar and pulsating percussion." Cash Box said that the song has "caressing, exuberant lead vocals backed by Sister Sledge's infectious harmony vocals." Richard Smith from Melody Maker commented, "Everybody from the women's movement to troupes of cheerleaders claimed the mighty "We Are Family" as their own anthem, but it's always had a special place in the hearts of gay men. Appropriation or intention? Chic were quite canny – it was New York's gay clubs that had broken them and songs like this were a way of paying back the debt."

=== 1993 remix ===
In his weekly UK chart commentary, James Masterton wrote, "Your eyes do not deceive you. At a time when the 1970s are suddenly hip again, one of the best soul disco records ever made return in a new set of mixes for 1993." Paul Lester from Melody Maker felt it's "perfunctorily remixed", adding, "It remains the last word in identikit-robot-girls-sing-gospel-tinged-melodies-over-machine-beats pop and proves that rock crits have always had guilty consciences about the records they (claim to) like." Alan Jones from Music Week stated that the song "gets a new treatment from the Sure Is Pure dream team. The result, while less distinctive than the original with much of Chic's sterling instrumental work suppressed, is a hot and contemporary garage track." Another Music Week editor, Andy Beevers, named it Pick of the Week in the category of Dance, adding, "This most enduring and endearing of club classics should make the Top 40 for the third time thanks to a wonderful and suitably reverential remix by Sure Is Pure."

== Music video ==
A music video was filmed in 1979 to promote the single, featuring the group wearing red outfits and dancing to the song in an urbanesque setting. It was later made available on YouTube in 2013 and had generated more than 10 million views as of January 2025.

== Impact and legacy ==
The 1979 World Series Champion Pittsburgh Pirates used "We Are Family" as their official theme song. It was chosen by Willie Stargell as the team waited out a rain delay on June 1, prior to a game in which they would mount a ninth-inning comeback to win. After the team adopted the song, it rose to second on the charts, whereas previously it had not gone above fourth.

In 2000, VH1 ranked "We Are Family" No. 3 in their list of "100 Greatest Dance Songs". In 2008, the 1979 release of the song on the Cotillion / Atlantic label was inducted into the Grammy Hall of Fame. In 2009, it was ranked No. 66 on Entertainment Weekly's "The 100 Greatest Summer Songs", saying, "Disco never sounds better than during the midyear months, and this one even makes family get-togethers tolerable." In 2016, Billboard magazine ranked it No. 18 in their list of "The 35 Best Disco Songs Ever" and No. 20 in their list of "100 Greatest Girl Group Songs of All Time" in 2017. In 2022, Rolling Stone ranked the song No. 34 in their list of "200 Greatest Dance Songs of All Time". In 2023, Billboard ranked "We Are Family" No. 444 in their "Best Pop Songs of All Time". In 2024, Forbes ranked it No. 11 in their list of "The 30 Greatest Disco Songs of All Time". In 2025, Billboard ranked it No. 79 in their "The 100 Greatest LGBTQ+ Anthems of All Time"-list.

== Charts ==
=== Weekly charts ===
Chart (1979–1980)	Peak position
Australia (Kent Music Report)	19
Belgium (VRT Top 30 Flanders)	20
Canada Top Singles (RPM)	1
Canada Top Dance Singles (RPM)	1
France (SNEP)	95
Ireland (IRMA)	20
Italy (Musica e dischi)	19
Netherlands (Dutch Top 40)	14
Netherlands (Single Top 100)	16
New Zealand (Recorded Music NZ)	6
Switzerland (Schweizer Hitparade)	6
UK Singles (Official Charts)	8
US Billboard Hot 100	2
US Adult Contemporary (Billboard)	30
US Dance Club Songs (Billboard)	1
US Cash Box Top 100	2
West Germany (GfK)	26

Chart (1984)	Peak position
Ireland (IRMA)	27
Netherlands (Dutch Top 40)	39
Netherlands (Single Top 100)	25
UK Singles (OCC)	33

Chart (1993)	Peak position
Europe (Eurochart Hot 100)	16
Europe (European Dance Radio)	6
Finland (Suomen virallinen lista)	10
Ireland (IRMA)	6
UK Singles (OCC)	5
UK Airplay (Music Week)	7
UK Dance (Music Week)	1
UK Club Chart (Music Week)	4
US Hot Dance Club Play (Billboard)	31

=== Year-end charts ===
Chart (1979)	Position
Canada Top Singles (RPM)	55
New Zealand (Recorded Music NZ)	41
US Billboard Hot 100	53
US Cash Box Top 100	21

Chart (1993)	Position
UK Club Chart (Music Week)	55

== Certifications and sales ==
Region	Certification	Certified units/sales
Greece	—	3,500
New Zealand (RMNZ)	Platinum	30,000^{‡}
United Kingdom (BPI)	Platinum	600,000^{‡}
United States (RIAA)	Gold	1,000,000^{^}
^{^} Shipments figures based on certification alone.^{‡} Sales+streaming figures based on certification alone.

== Cover versions ==
Many artists have covered the song. Among the more notable versions is one by Babes in Toyland, which was a dance club hit in the U.S. It peaked at number 22 on the Billboard Hot Dance Music/Club Play chart in 1995. In addition, Nile Rodgers organized a re-recording of the song in 2001 as a benefit record for the September 11 attacks. This in turn led to his co-creation of the We Are Family Foundation, a global charity named for the song and designed to inspire and educate young people to find solutions to problems such as hunger and illiteracy that impede world peace.

Rodgers also produced a version featuring characters from popular TV shows from PBS Kids, Nickelodeon and Disney Channel such as Sesame Street, Between the Lions, Bear in the Big Blue House, Barney & Friends, etc. This version aired on Disney Channel, and its early programming block Playhouse Disney, Nickelodeon, and PBS Kids on March 11, 2002, and subsequently was commercially released on DVD in 2005 as a public service announcement to promote diversity and tolerance, which triggered a response from a right-wing evangelical group which felt that SpongeBob SquarePants promoted homosexuality. In December 2007, the song was announced as one of the 2008 inductees to the Grammy Hall of Fame.
