= Lost in Music =

Single by Sister Sledge

from the album We Are Family
- B-side: "Thinking of You"
- Released: July 11, 1979
- Recorded: 1978
- Studio: Power Station, New York City, New York, US
- Genre: Disco; funk; soul; R&B
- Length: 3:24 (single version); 4:47 (album version)
- Songwriters: Nile Rodgers; Bernard Edwards
- Producers: Nile Rodgers; Bernard Edwards

Sister Sledge singles chronology
"We Are Family" (1979)	"Lost in Music" (1979)	"Got to Love Somebody" (1979)

"Lost in Music" is a song by American vocal group Sister Sledge, released in July 1979 as the third single from their third studio album, We Are Family (1979), an album entirely written, produced, and arranged by Nile Rodgers and Bernard Edwards (of the group Chic). The song was a No. 35 hit on the American R&B chart. In 1984 and 1993, "Lost in Music" was re-released in new remixes. In 2025, Billboard magazine included it in their list of "The 100 Best Dance Songs of All Time".

== Chart performance ==
"Lost in Music" was one of the group's biggest hits, charting at No. 35 on the US Billboard R&B chart (then called the Hot Soul Singles chart). It also reached the UK top twenty in three separate decades. The original version reached No. 17 in 1979, a remixed version reached No. 4 in 1984, and another remix reached No. 14 in 1993.

== Reception ==
=== Original version ===
Cash Box described the song as a "very Chic tune" with "sparse, elegant instrumentation and a "fascinating" hook. Richard Smith from Melody Maker wrote, "'Lost in Music' was a slice of pure pop heaven. A song about the simple thrill of going out dancing, every bit as thrilling as the feeling it was trying to describe." Record World said that the "clear clean production, snappy percussion, & choir-like vocals are overwhelming."

The Atlantic said, "People did a lot of cocaine to this song, but it doesn't sound like cocaine. It sounds natural and compassionate and connected: piano-gushes; a warm rush of strings; breathy, confiding vocals. The message is uncompromising: Get out on the dance floor, because the Protestant work ethic will kill you."

=== 1993 remix ===
Alan Jones from Music Week gave the 1993 remix three out of five, adding that "once again the original Chic hallmarks are ditched to turn the track into an edgy, percussive rattling slab of Nineties dance music."

== Legacy ==
In March 2025, Billboard magazine ranked "Lost in Music" number 91 in their list of "The 100 Best Dance Songs of All Time", writing, "While brimming with musical signatures from the era's überproducer duo of Bernard Edwards and Nile Rodgers, nothing hides the glory of the Sledges' mellifluous mirrorball harmonies."

== Charts ==
Chart (1979)	Peak position
Belgium (Ultratop)	14
Ireland (IRMA)	30
Netherlands (Dutch Top 40)	15
Netherlands (Single Top 100)	12
UK Singles (OCC)	17
US Hot Soul Singles (Billboard)	35

1984 Nile Rodgers remix

Chart (1984)	Peak position
Ireland (IRMA)	6
Netherlands (Dutch Top 40)	6
Netherlands (Single Top 100)	4
UK Singles (OCC)	4

1993 Sure Is Pure remix

Chart (1993)	Peak position
Europe (Eurochart Hot 100)	48
Europe (European Dance Radio)	4
Ireland (IRMA)	10
UK Singles (OCC)	14
UK Airplay (Music Week)	24
UK Dance (Music Week)	2

== Certifications ==
Region	Certification	Certified units/sales
United Kingdom (BPI)	Gold	400,000^{‡}
^{‡} Sales+streaming figures based on certification alone.

== Cover versions ==
A cover version of the song appeared on British post-punk band the Fall's 1993 album The Infotainment Scan; their "radically different" version has been read as a critique of the "unfair derision of the disco genre".

Anita Lane also covered the song on her album Dirty Pearl.
