= Cotillion Records =

Former American record label

- Late-1970s/early 1980s logo
- Parent company: Warner Music Group
- Founded: 1968
- Defunct: 1985
- Status: Defunct
- Distributor: Atlantic Records
- Genre: Various
- Country of origin: U.S.
- Location: New York City

Cotillion Records was a subsidiary of Atlantic Records (from 1971 part of WEA) and was active from 1968 through 1985. The label was formed as an outlet for soul, R&B, funk, pop, and jazz. Its first single, Otis Clay's version of "She's About a Mover", reached the R&B charts. Cotillion's catalog quickly expanded to include progressive rock, folk-rock, gospel, jazz and comedy. In 1976, the label started focusing on disco and R&B. At that point, Cotillion's catalog albums outside those genres were reissued on Atlantic.

Among its acts were the post-Curtis Mayfield Impressions; Slave; Brook Benton; Sister Sledge; Stacy Lattisaw; The Fatback Band; Young-Holt Unlimited; Freddie King; Jean Knight; Mass Production; Garland Green; The Dynamics; The Fabulous Counts; Lou Donaldson; The Velvet Underground; Danny O'Keefe; Mylon LeFevre; Stevie Woods; Johnny Gill; Emerson, Lake & Palmer; Slade; and Screaming Lord Sutch Herbie Mann recorded for them, and had his own record label subsidiary there, Embryo Records, in the 1970s.

Cotillion is also responsible for launching the career of Luther Vandross, who was in a three-member group called Luther (the rights now lay with his estate as he had bought them back when he was alive preventing reissues until 2024). The label also released music from the Woodstock festival in 1970.

Cotillion was closed down in 1986 and Stacy Lattisaw, Slave, and Sister Sledge were moved to its parent label Atlantic Records.

For Record Store Day 2013, Rhino Records released the 7-inch boxset Cotillion Records: Soul 45s (1968–1970), with ten 45 rpm singles from Darrell Banks, Otis Clay, Moses Smith, and Baby Washington. The release was a limited edition of 2500 copies worldwide.

== See also ==
- List of record labels
