= Chic discography =

- Studio albums: 9
- Soundtrack albums: 1
- Live albums: 2
- Compilation albums: 12
- Singles: 27

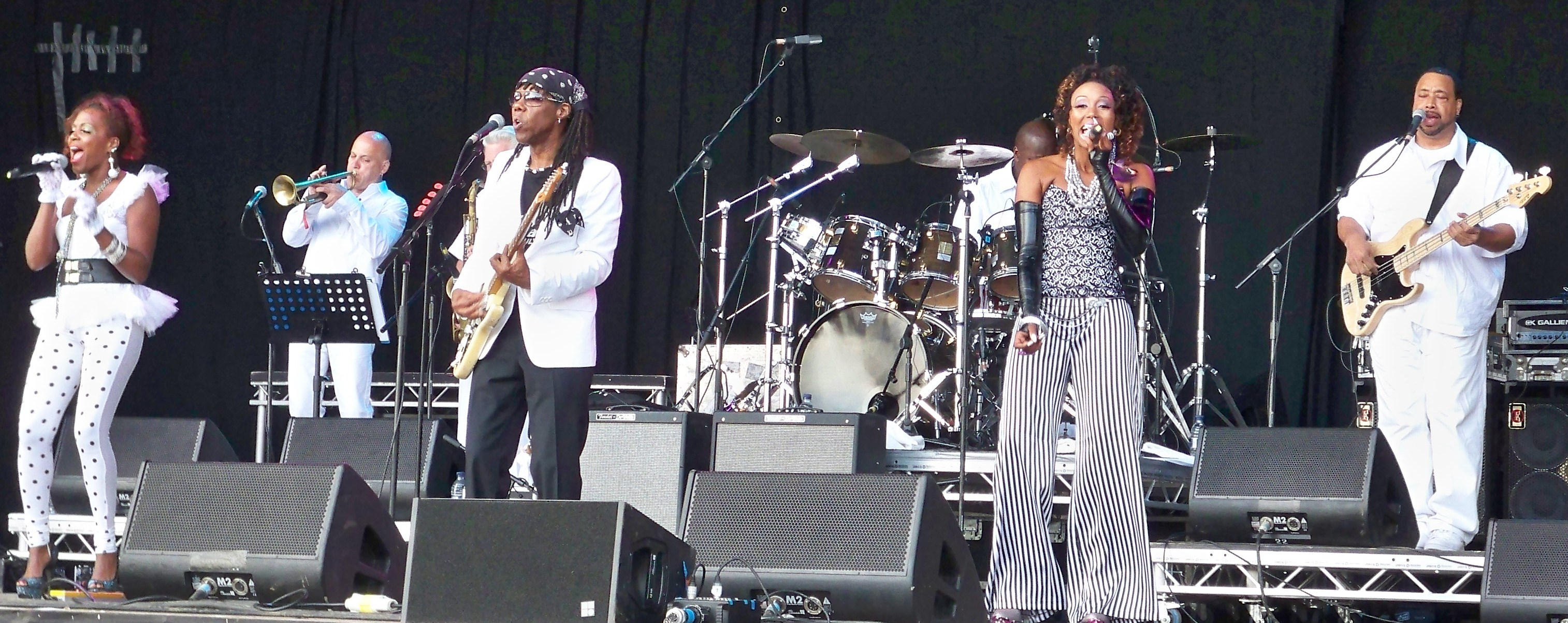
Chic at Guilfest 2012.

American disco group Chic released a number of albums in the period 1977 to 1983. After 1983's Believer the group did not record a studio album until 1992's Chic-Ism. The band has since continued to tour and release live and compilation albums. The group's first studio album in 26 years, titled It's About Time was released in September 2018. Nile Rodgers and Bernard Edwards produced for a series of artists in the years 1978 to 1982. They sometimes produced under the name 'The Chic Organization'.

== Albums ==
=== Studio albums ===
Year	Album details	Peak chart positions										Certifications
Year	Album details	US	US R&B	AUS	AUT	CAN	GER	NLD	NOR	SWE	UK	Certifications
1977	Chic: Released: November 22, 1977; Label: Atlantic	27	12	67	—	25	—	—	—	—	—	RIAA: Gold
1978	C'est Chic: Released: August 11, 1978; Label: Atlantic	4	1	18	21	5	10	9	20	16	2	RIAA: Platinum; BPI: Gold; MC: Platinum
1979	Risqué: Released: July 30, 1979; Label: Atlantic	5	2	75	—	15	—	—	—	37	29	RIAA: Platinum; BPI: Silver
1980	Real People: Released: June 30, 1980; Label: Atlantic	30	8	—	—	—	—	—	33	19	—	
1981	Take It Off: Released: November 16, 1981; Label: Atlantic	124	36	—	—	—	—	—	—	—	—	
1982	Tongue in Chic: Released: November 1, 1982; Label: Atlantic	173	47	—	—	—	—	—	—	—	—	
1983	Believer: Released: November 14, 1983; Label: Atlantic	—	—	—	—	—	—	14	—	—	—	
1992	Chic-ism: Released: March 3, 1992; Label: Warner Bros.	—	39	—	—	—	55	44	—	42	—	
2018	It's About Time: Released: September 28, 2018; Label: Virgin EMI	—	—	—	—	—	72	66	—	—	10	
"—" denotes a recording that did not chart or was not released in that territory.

=== Live albums ===
- Live at the Budokan (1999)
- A Night in Amsterdam (2006)

=== Compilation albums ===
Charting compilations

Year	Album details	Peak chart positions				Certifications
Year	Album details	US	US R&B	NLD	UK	Certifications
1979	Les Plus Grands Succès De Chic: Chic's Greatest Hits: Released: December 1979; Label: Atlantic	88	44	47	30	
1987	Freak Out: The Greatest Hits of Chic and Sister Sledge: Released: 1987; Label: Atlantic/WEA	—	—	—	72	
2013	Nile Rodgers presents The Chic Organization: Up All Night: Released: 2013; Label: Rhino	—	—	—	2*	BPI: Gold
"—" denotes a recording that did not chart or was not released in that territory.

* Compilation albums chart.

Complete list

- Les Plus Grands Succès De Chic: Chic's Greatest Hits (1979, Atlantic Records)
- Freak Out: The Greatest Hits of Chic and Sister Sledge (1988, Atlantic Records/WEA)
- Megachic: Best of Chic (1990, Warner Music/Atlantic Records)
- Dance, Dance, Dance: The Best of Chic (1991, Atlantic Records/Rhino Records/Warner Music), BPI: Silver
- The Best of Chic, Volume 2 (1992, Atlantic Records/Rhino Records/Warner Music)
- Everybody Dance (1995, Rhino Records/Warner Music)
- Chic Freak and More Treats (1996, A440 Music Group)
- Dance, Dance, Dance & Other Hits (1997, Rhino Records/Warner Music)
- The Very Best of Chic & Sister Sledge (1999, Rhino Records/Warner Music)
- The Very Best of Chic (2000, Rhino Records/Warner Music)
- Good Times: The Very Best of the Hits & the Remixes (Chic & Sister Sledge) (2005, Warner Music)
- The Definitive Groove Collection (2006, Rhino Records/Warner Music), BPI: Silver
- Nile Rodgers presents The Chic Organization: Vol.1 Savoir Faire (box set, 2010, Rhino Records, reissued 2013)
- Original Album Series: Chic + C'est Chic + Risqué + Real People + Take It Off (2011, Rhino Records/Atlantic Records)
- Magnifique: The Very Best of Chic (2011, Music Club Deluxe)
- Nile Rodgers presents The Chic Organization: Up All Night (2013, Rhino Records)
- The Chic Organization, 1977–1979 (2018)

All of the combined Chic and Sister Sledge compilations also contain some Sister Sledge material without Chic's involvement. The two "Nile Rodgers presents The Chic Organization" collections contain "Chic Organization" productions for other artists alongside Chic's own material.

== Singles ==
Year	Title	Peak chart positions										Certifications	Album
Year	Title	US	US R&B	US Dan	US CB	AUS	CAN	GER	IRE	NLD	UK	Certifications	Album
1977	"Dance, Dance, Dance (Yowsah, Yowsah, Yowsah)"	6	6	1	6	28	6	40	11	22	6	RIAA: Gold; BPI: Silver	Chic
1978	"Everybody Dance"	38	12	1	49	—	45	—	6	—	9	BPI: Silver	Chic
1978	"You Can Get By"	—	—	1	—	—	—	—	—	—	—		Chic
1978	"Le Freak"	1	1	1	1	1	1	5	20	2	7	RIAA: 5× Platinum; BPI: Platinum; MC: 2× Platinum	C'est Chic
1978	"I Want Your Love"	7	5	1	10	81	10	27	20	14	4	RIAA: Gold	C'est Chic
1978	"Chic Cheer"	—	—	1	—	—	—	—	—	—	—		C'est Chic
1979	"Good Times"	1	1	3	1	48	2	36	21	17	5	RIAA: Gold; BPI: Silver	Risqué
1979	"My Forbidden Lover"	43	33	3	—	—	—	47	28	23	15		Risqué
1979	"My Feet Keep Dancing"	101	42	3	—	—	—	—	18	—	21		Risqué
1980	"Rebels Are We"	61	8	29	77	—	—	—	—	—	—		Real People
1980	"Real People"	79	51	29	—	—	—	—	—	—	—		Real People
1980	"Chip off the Old Block"	79	—	29	—	—	—	—	—	—	—		Real People
1981	"Stage Fright"	—	34	—	—	—	—	—	—	—	—		Take It Off
1982	"Soup for One"	80	14	—	—	—	—	—	—	—	—		Soup for One
1982	"Hangin'"	—	48	—	—	—	—	—	—	40	64		Tongue in Chic
1983	"Give Me the Lovin'"	—	57	—	—	—	—	—	—	—	—		Believer
1984	"You Are Beautiful"	—	—	—	—	—	—	—	—	6	—		Believer
1984	"Party Everybody"	—	—	—	—	—	—	—	—	43	—		Believer
1984	"Chic Cheer" (1984 Mix)	—	—	—	—	—	—	—	—	—	81		—N/a
1987	"Jack Le Freak"	—	—	15	—	—	—	—	13	6	19		—N/a
1988	"Good Times" (New Single Mix '88)	—	—	—	—	—	—	—	—	63	—		—N/a
1990	"MegaChic - Chic Medley"	—	—	—	—	—	—	—	—	—	58		—N/a
1992	"Chic Mystique"	—	48	1	—	82	—	25	—	19	48		Chic-Ism
1992	"Your Love"	—	—	3	—	—	—	91	—	73	80		Chic-Ism
2015	"I'll Be There"	—	—	1	—	—	—	—	—	—	68		—N/a
2018	"Till the World Falls" (featuring Mura Masa, Cosha and Vic Mensa)	—	—	—	—	—	—	—	—	—	—		It's About Time
2018	"Sober" (featuring Craig David and Stefflon Don)	—	—	—	—	—	—	—	—	—	—		It's About Time
"—" denotes a recording that did not chart or was not released in that territory.

=== As featured performer ===
Year	Title	Artist	Peak chart positions			Album
Year	Title	Artist	FIN	NLD	UK	Album
1982	"Together"	Odyssey	—	—	—	Happy Together
2006	"Sensitivity"	Shapeshifters	18	21	40	Sound Advice
"—" denotes a recording that did not chart or was not released in that territory.

- "Happy Together" is written and played by Rodgers and Edwards, with regular Chic member Robert Sabino also appearing, but produced by Jimmy Douglass.
- "Sensitivity" samples an unreleased Chic track, "Love and Be Loved", with additional guitar by Rodgers.

== Artists produced by Chic ==
=== Albums ===
Year	Artist	Album details	Peak chart positions			Certifications (sales thresholds)
Year	Artist	Album details	US	US R&B	UK	Certifications (sales thresholds)
1978	Norma Jean Wright	Norma Jean: Label: Bearsville/Warner Bros.	—	—	—	
1979	Sister Sledge	We Are Family: Label: Cotillion/Atlantic	3	1	7	RIAA: Platinum; BPI: Gold
1980	Sheila and B. Devotion	King of the World: Label: Mirage/Atco/Atlantic	—	—	—	
1980	Sister Sledge	Love Somebody Today: Label: Cotillion/Atlantic	31	7	—	
1980	Diana Ross	diana: Label: Motown/MCA	2	1	12	RIAA: Platinum; BPI: Gold
1981	Debbie Harry	Koo Koo: Label: Chrysalis/CBS	28	—	6	RIAA: Gold; BPI: Silver
1981	Johnny Mathis	I Love My Lady: Label: Columbia/CBS; Recorded 1981, released 2017	—	—	—	
1982	Fonzi Thornton	Untitled: Label: Unreleased	—	—	—	
1982	Various Artists (soundtrack album)	Soup for One: Label: Warner Bros.	168	42	—	

The title of the Fonzi Thornton album is given by several websites as Frostbite, though there is no known official source for this.

The core members of Chic (Edwards, Rodgers and Thompson, together with keyboard player Robert Sabino) also performed together on Madonna's 1984 album Like a Virgin, which was produced by Rodgers, though it is not officially a Chic Organization work.

=== Singles ===
Year	Artist	Title	Peak chart positions					Album
Year	Artist	Title	US	US R&B	US Dan	US A/C	UK	Album
1978	Norma Jean Wright	"Saturday"	—	15	10	—	—	Norma Jean
1979	Sister Sledge	"He's The Greatest Dancer"	9	1	1	—	6	We Are Family
1979	Sister Sledge	"We Are Family"	2	1	1	30	8	We Are Family
1979	Sister Sledge	"Lost in Music"	—	35	1	—	17	We Are Family
1979	Norma Jean Wright	"High Society"	—	19	92	—	—	—N/a
1980	Sheila & B. Devotion	"Spacer"	—	28	44	—	18	King of the World
1980	Sister Sledge	"Got to Love Somebody Today"	64	6	34	—	34	Love Somebody Today
1980	Sister Sledge	"Reach Your Peak"	—	21	34	—	—	Love Somebody Today
1980	Sister Sledge	"Let's Go on Vacation"	—	63	—	—	—	Love Somebody Today
1980	Diana Ross	"Upside Down"	1	1	1	18	2	diana
1980	Diana Ross	"I'm Coming Out"	5	5	1	—	13	diana
1980	Diana Ross	"My Old Piano"	—	—	—	—	5	diana
1981	Debbie Harry	"Backfired"	43	71	29	—	32	Koo Koo
1981	Debbie Harry	"The Jam Was Moving"	82	—	—	—	—	Koo Koo
1982	Diana Ross	"Tenderness"	—	—	—	—	73	diana
1982	Carly Simon	"Why"	74	—	—	—	10	Soup for One
1984	Sister Sledge	"Thinking of You"	—	—	—	—	11	We Are Family
1984	Sister Sledge	"Lost In Music" (1984 Remix by Nile Rodgers)	—	—	—	—	4	We Are Family
1984	Sister Sledge	"We Are Family" (1984 Remix by Bernard Edwards)	—	—	—	—	33	We Are Family
1993	Sister Sledge	"Thinking of You" ('93 Mixes by RAMP)	—	—	—	—	21	The Very Best of Sister Sledge (1973–1993)
1993	Sister Sledge	"Lost In Music" (Sure Is Pure Remixes)	—	—	—	—	14	The Very Best of Sister Sledge (1973–1993)
1993	Sister Sledge	"We Are Family" ('93 Mixes by Sure Is Pure)	—	—	31	—	5	The Very Best of Sister Sledge (1973–1993)
