= Dance, Dance, Dance & Other Hits =

Compilation album by Chic
- Released: 1997
- Recorded: 1977–1982
- Genre: Disco, funk, R&B
- Label: Rhino; Warner
- Producer: Nile Rodgers, Bernard Edwards

Dance, Dance, Dance & Other Hits is a compilation album by American R&B band Chic, released by Rhino Records/Warner Music in 1997. The album is a re-release of 1995's Everybody Dance with the tracks in re-arranged order and new artwork.

It was rated three stars by AllMusic.

== Track listing ==
All tracks written by Bernard Edwards and Nile Rodgers unless otherwise noted.

1. "Le Freak" - 5:31
  - From 1978 album C'est Chic
2. "Rebels Are We" (7" Edit) - 3:20
  - Original version appears on 1980 album Real People
3. "Soup for One" (7" Edit) - 3:07
  - Original version appears 1982 soundtrack album Soup For One
4. "Everybody Dance" - 6:40
  - From 1977 album Chic
5. "Dance, Dance, Dance (Yowsah, Yowsah, Yowsah)" (Edwards, Lehman, Rodgers) - 8:22
  - From 1977 album Chic
6. "Good Times" - 8:13
  - From 1979 album Risqué
7. "My Forbidden Lover" - 4:42
  - From 1979 album Risqué
8. "Real People" (7" Edit) - 3:46
  - Original version appears on 1980 album Real People
9. "Chip off the Old Block" - 5:00
  - From 1980 album Real People
10. "I Want Your Love" - 6:55
  - From 1978 album C'est Chic

== Production ==
- Bernard Edwards - producer for Chic Organization Ltd.
- Nile Rodgers - producer for Chic Organization Ltd.
