= The Very Best of Chic =

Greatest hits album by Chic
- Released: March 14, 2000
- Recorded: 1977–1982
- Genre: Disco, funk, R&B
- Length: 74:53
- Label: Atlantic
- Producer: Nile Rodgers, Bernard Edwards

Professional ratings
Review scores
Source	Rating
Allmusic	5/5 stars

The Very Best of Chic is a compilation album of recordings by American R&B band Chic, released by Rhino Records/Warner Music in 2000. The compilation covers the band's hits and best-known album tracks recorded between the years 1977 and 1982. All selections are original full-length album versions.

== Track listing ==
All tracks written by Bernard Edwards and Nile Rodgers unless otherwise noted.

1. "Dance, Dance, Dance (Yowsah, Yowsah, Yowsah)" - 8:21 (Edwards/Rodgers/Lehman)
  - From 1977 album Chic
2. "Everybody Dance" - 6:42
  - From 1977 album Chic
3. "Le Freak" – 5:23
  - From 1978 album C'est Chic
4. "I Want Your Love" - 6:45
  - From 1978 album C'est Chic
5. "Good Times" - 8:13
  - From 1979 album Risqué
6. "My Forbidden Lover" - 4:42
  - From 1979 album Risqué
7. "What About Me" - 4:14
  - From 1979 album Risqué
8. "My Feet Keep Dancing" - 6:46
  - From 1979 album Risqué
9. "Rebels Are We" - 4:56
  - From 1980 album Real People
10. "Real People" - 5:20
  - From 1980 album Real People
11. "Stage Fright" - 3:57
  - From 1981 album Take It Off
12. "Just Out of Reach" - 3:46
  - From 1981 album Take It Off
13. "Soup for One" - 5:35
  - From 1982 soundtrack album Soup For One

== Production ==
- Bernard Edwards - producer for Chic Organization Ltd.
- Nile Rodgers - producer for Chic Organization Ltd.
