= The Best of Chic, Volume 2 =

Greatest hits album by Chic
- Released: Nov 10, 1992
- Recorded: 1979–1983
- Genre: Disco, funk, R&B
- Length: 71:16
- Label: Atlantic, Rhino, Warner Bros.
- Producer: Nile Rodgers, Bernard Edwards

Professional ratings
Review scores
Source	Rating
AllMusic	4.5/5 stars

The Best of Chic, Volume 2 is a greatest hits album of recordings by American R&B band Chic, released by Atlantic Records/Rhino Records/Warner Music in 1992. The compilation focuses on single releases and album tracks from the band's later career, 1979–1983.

== Track listing ==
All tracks written by Bernard Edwards and Nile Rodgers.

1. "Rebels Are We" (7" Edit) - 3:21
  - Original version appears on 1980 album Real People
2. "What About Me" - 4:18
  - From 1979 album Risqué
3. "26" - 4:04
  - From 1980 album Real People
4. "Will You Cry (When You Hear This Song)" - 4:09
  - From 1979 album Risqué
5. "Stage Fright" (7" Edit) - 3:39
  - Original version appears on 1981 album Take It Off
6. "Real People" (7" Edit) - 3:45
  - Original version appears on 1980 album Real People
7. "Hangin'" (7" Edit) - 3:45
  - Original version appears on 1982 album Tongue in Chic
8. "Give Me the Lovin'" (7" Edit) - 3:38
  - Original version appears on 1983 album Believer
9. "At Last I Am Free" - 7:11
  - From 1978 album C'est Chic
10. "Just Out Of Reach" - 3:47
  - From 1981 album Take It Off
11. "When You Love Someone" - 5:08
  - From 1982 album Tongue in Chic
12. "Your Love Is Cancelled" - 3:47
  - From 1981 album Take It Off
13. "Believer" - 5:08
  - From 1983 album Believer
14. "You Are Beautiful" - 4:15
  - From 1983 album Believer
15. "Flash Back" (Edwards, Rodgers) - 4:30
  - From 1981 album Take It Off
16. "You Can't Do It Alone" - 5:07
  - From 1980 album Real People
17. "Tavern on the Green" - 2:14
  - From 1982 soundtrack album Soup For One

== Production ==
- Bernard Edwards - producer for Chic Organization Ltd.
- Nile Rodgers - producer for Chic Organization Ltd.
