= The Definitive Groove Collection =

Compilation album by Chic
- Released: August 8, 2006
- Recorded: 1977–1992
- Genre: Disco, funk, R&B
- Length: 155:40
- Label: Rhino/Warner Music
- Producer: Nile Rodgers, Bernard Edwards

Professional ratings
Review scores
Source	Rating
Allmusic	4.5/5 stars

The Definitive Groove Collection is a compilation album of recordings by American R&B band Chic, released by Rhino Records/Warner Music in 2006. The Definitive Groove Collection is the first two-disc Chic compilation to be released and contains all the band's hits and best known album tracks from 1977's Chic to 1992's Chic-Ism in (near) chronological order.

== Track listing ==
All tracks written by Bernard Edwards and Nile Rodgers unless otherwise noted.

Disc one:

1. "Dance, Dance, Dance (Yowsah, Yowsah, Yowsah)" (Edwards, Lehman, Rodgers) - 8:21
2. "Everybody Dance" - 6:42
3. "Strike Up the Band" (Edwards, Lehman, Rodgers) - 4:34
  - Tracks 1–3 from 1977 album Chic
4. "Le Freak" - 5:31
5. "Savoir Faire" - 5:04
6. "Chic Cheer" - 4:44
7. "At Last I Am Free" - 7:13
8. "I Want Your Love" - 6:56
  - Tracks 4–8 from 1978 album C'est Chic
9. "Good Times" - 8:15
10. "My Forbidden Lover" - 4:42
11. "What About Me" - 4:13
12. "My Feet Keep Dancing" - 6:41
  - Tracks 9–12 from 1979 album Risqué
13. "Chip off the Old Block" - 5:00
  - From 1980 album Real People

Disc two:

1. "Rebels Are We" (7" Edit) - 3:21
2. "Real People" (7" Edit) - 3:45
  - Tracks 1 & 2 from 1980 album Real People
3. "Will You Cry (When You Hear This Song)" - 4:09
  - From 1979 album Risqué
4. "26" - 4:06
5. "You Can't Do It Alone" - 4:47
  - Tracks 4 & 5 from 1980 album Real People
6. "Stage Fright" (7" Edit) - 3:39
7. "Just out of Reach" - 3:47
8. "Flash Back" - 4:29
9. "Your Love Is Cancelled" - 4:16
  - Tracks 6–9 from 1981 album Take It Off
10. "Soup for One" - 5:36
  - From 1982 album Soup For One (soundtrack)
11. "When You Love Someone" - 5:09
12. "Hangin'" (7" Edit) - 3:38
  - Tracks 11 & 12 from 1982 album Tongue in Chic
13. "Give Me the Lovin'" (7" Edit) - 3:32
14. "Believer" - 5:07
15. "You Are Beautiful" - 4:37
  - Tracks 13–15 from 1983 album Believer
16. "Chic Mystique" (Edwards, Princesa, Rodgers) - 6:39
17. "Your Love" - 5:57
  - Tracks 16 & 17 from 1992 album Chic-ism

== Certifications ==
Certifications and sales for The Definitive Groove Collection
Region	Certification	Certified units/sales
United Kingdom (BPI)	Silver	60,000^{‡}
^{‡} Sales+streaming figures based on certification alone.
