= The Very Best of Chic & Sister Sledge =

Greatest hits album by Chic
- Released: Sep 27, 1999
- Recorded: 1977–1979, 1985, 1993, 1999
- Genre: Disco, funk, R&B, jazz, samba
- Label: Rhino; Warner Music
- Producer: Nile Rodgers, Bernard Edwards

Professional ratings
Review scores
Source	Rating
Allmusic	3/5 stars

The Very Best of Chic & Sister Sledge is a compilation album of recordings by American R&B bands Chic and Sister Sledge, released by Rhino Records/Warner Music in 1999. An expanded two-disc edition of the compilation was released by Warner Music in 2005, under the title Good Times: The Very Best of the Hits & the Remixes.

== Track listing ==
All tracks written by Bernard Edwards and Nile Rodgers unless otherwise noted.

1. "We Are Family" (7" Edit) - 3:21
  - Performed by: Sister Sledge. Original version appears on 1979 album We Are Family
2. "Good Times" (7" Edit) - 3:38
  - Performed by: Chic. Original version appears on 1979 album Risqué
3. "Lost in Music" (7" Edit) - 3:21
  - Performed by: Sister Sledge. Original version appears on 1979 album We Are Family
4. "Le Freak" (7" Edit) - 3:32
  - Performed by: Chic. Original version appears on 1978 album C'est Chic
5. "He's the Greatest Dancer" - 6:10
  - Performed by: Sister Sledge. From 1979 album We Are Family
6. "I Want Your Love" (7" Edit) - 3:23
  - Performed by: Chic. Original version appears on 1978 album C'est Chic
7. "Everybody Dance" (7" Edit) - 4:09
  - Performed by: Chic. Original version appears on 1977 album Chic
8. "Dance, Dance, Dance (Yowsah, Yowsah, Yowsah)" (7" Edit) (Edwards, Lehman, Rodgers) - 3:40
  - Performed by: Chic. Original version appears on 1977 album Chic
9. "Thinking of You" - 4:27
  - Performed by: Sister Sledge. From 1979 album We Are Family
10. "Frankie" (Denny) - 3:52
  - Performed by: Sister Sledge. From 1985 album When The Boys Meet The Girls
11. "We Are Family" (Sure Is Pure Remix, Radio Edit) - 3:57
  - Performed by: Sister Sledge. Original version appears on 1979 album We Are Family
12. "Lost in Music" (Sure Is Pure Remix) - 5:02
  - Performed by: Sister Sledge. Original version appears on 1979 album We Are Family
13. "I Want Your Love" (Stonebridge Remix) - 8:43
  - Performed by: Chic. Original version appears on 1978 album C'est Chic
14. "Good Times" (A Touch of Jazz Remix) - 5:15
  - Performed by: Chic. Original version appears on 1979 album Risqué
15. "He's the Greatest Dancer" (Brutal Bill Remix) - 5:29
  - Performed by: Sister Sledge. Original version appears on 1979 album We Are Family
16. "Thinking of You" (Ramp Remix) - 7:28
  - Performed by: Sister Sledge. Original version appears on 1979 album We Are Family

== Production ==
- Bernard Edwards - producer for Chic Organization Ltd.
- Nile Rodgers - producer for Chic Organization Ltd.
