= Everybody Dance =

Everybody Dance may refer to:

== Film and television ==
- Everybody Dance (film), a 1936 British film
- Everybody Dance! (TV series), a Ukrainian television program

== Music ==
- Everybody Dance (album), a compilation album by Chic
- "Everybody Dance" (Chic song), a 1978 song by Chic
- "Everybody Dance" (Evolution song), a 1993 song by Evolution
- "Everybody Dance" (Ta Mara and the Seen song)
- "Everybody Dance (The Horn Song)" by Barbara Tucker
- "Everybody Dance", by Moka Only and S-Roc from The Desired Effect, 2005

== Software ==
- Everybody Dance (video game), a 2011 PlayStation 3 video game
