= Soup for One (soundtrack) =

1982 soundtrack album by the Chic Organization

Soundtrack album by Chic
- Released: May 2, 1982
- Recorded: 1978–1982
- Genre: Disco, funk, R&B
- Length: 36:46
- Label: Mirage
- Producer: Nile Rodgers, Bernard Edwards

Chic chronology
| Take It Off (1981) | Soup for One (1982) | Tongue in Chic (1982) |

Singles from Soup for One
- 1. "Soup for One" Released: 1982; 2. "Why" Released: 1982

Soup for One is the soundtrack album to the movie Soup for One produced by American R&B band Chic, and released by Mirage Records in 1982. The album reached number 168 on the Billboard 200 albums chart and number 42 on the R&B chart. Besides three previously released tracks; Chic's "I Want Your Love" from their 1978 album C'est Chic, Sister Sledge's "Let's Go On Vacation" from their 1980 album Love Somebody Today and "Jump Jump" from Debbie Harry's 1981 album KooKoo, the album contains five songs specifically written and produced by Bernard Edwards and Nile Rodgers for the movie.

The work was produced as Chic was transitioning to using more digital technologies. The album features programmed drums along with analogue-played bass, guitar, piano and synth.

Chic's title track stalled at number 80 on the US Pop chart, but was a Top 20 hit on the R&B singles chart, peaking at number 14, making it their best R&B chart entry since 1980s "Rebels Are We".

"Why" by Carly Simon was only moderately successful on its initial release in the US (Pop No. 74, September 1982), but the song turned out to be a surprise hit in Europe, where it reached number 10 on the UK singles chart. Later, the extended 12" remix (featuring additional vocals by Chic's Alfa Anderson and Luci Martin) also became something of an underground club classic in the US. An instrumental version of the song (without Simon's vocals, and credited simply to Chic) was released as the B-side of the 7" single, and an extended instrumental version was included on the 12" single. Paradoxically, "Why" was the biggest hit single from the album but was not actually featured in the film.

The Soup for One album also includes Chic's one and only collaboration with soul singer Teddy Pendergrass, the ballad "Dream Girl". Pendergrass had a small role as a nightclub singer performing the song in the movie, however it was never issued as a single.

Long-standing Chic vocalist Fonzi Thornton's track "I Work for a Livin'" is taken from what was planned to be his first solo project. The album, entitled Frostbite, was written and produced by Edwards and Rodgers and recorded in 1981/82 but remains unreleased. Chic also wrote the track "Riding", performed by Thornton, which appeared in the film, but was not included on the soundtrack album (and was another cut intended for Thornton's unreleased solo project).

"Tavern on the Green" is an instrumental acoustic guitar piece, and another instrumental Chic track, "Open Up" (from their 1980 album Real People), also appeared in the film but was not included on the soundtrack album.

== Legacy ==
A Tribe Called Quest sampled "Why" for their 1990 hit "Bonita Applebum", as did British rapper Glamma Kid in 1999, taking the song back up to number 10 on the UK Singles Chart.

Chic's song "Soup for One" was sampled by French dance act Modjo for their 2000 song "Lady (Hear Me Tonight)", a number 1 hit in most of Europe.

The Soup for One soundtrack album was reissued on compact disc in 2015, featuring two extra tracks: the extended 12" versions of Chic's "Soup For One" and Carly Simon's "Why".

Despite UK popularity, the album is relatively unknown in the US. According to a Drowned in Sound interview with Chic co-founder Nile Rogers, this is because "Carly Simon had done something to piss off the rock hierarchy…we don’t know what that was!"

== Track listing ==
All tracks written by Bernard Edwards and Nile Rodgers unless otherwise noted.

Side A

1. Chic - "Soup for One" - 5:35
2. Carly Simon - "Why" - 4:06
3. Teddy Pendergrass - "Dream Girl" - 4:10
4. Fonzi Thornton - "I Work for a Livin'" - 3:31

Side B

1. Chic - "I Want Your Love" - 6:58
2. Sister Sledge - "Let's Go On Vacation" - 5:09
3. Chic - "Tavern on the Green" - 2:15
4. Deborah Harry - "Jump Jump" (Debbie Harry, Chris Stein) - 4:04

Bonus tracks on the CD and digital versions

- Chic - "Soup For One" (12" version) - 7:58
- Carly Simon - "Why" (12" version) - 8:14

== Personnel ==
- Bernard Edwards - lead vocals, bass guitar
- Carly Simon - lead vocals
- Teddy Pendergrass - lead vocals
- Fonzi Thornton - lead vocals
- Alfa Anderson - lead vocals
- Debbie Sledge (Sister Sledge) - lead vocals
- Joni Sledge (Sister Sledge) - vocals
- Kathy Sledge (Sister Sledge) - vocals
- Kim Sledge (Sister Sledge) - vocals
- Deborah Harry - lead vocals
- Nile Rodgers - guitar, vocals
- Tony Thompson - drums
- Luci Martin - vocals
- Michelle Cobbs - vocals
- Jocelyn Brown - vocals
- Diva Gray - vocals
- Robin Clark - vocals
- Raymond Jones - keyboards
- Andy Schwartz - keyboards
- Sammy Figueroa - percussion
- Meco Monardo - horns
- Robert Millikan - horns
- Eddie Daniels - horns
- José Rossi - tubular bells
- Chic Strings - strings

=== Production ===
- Bernard Edwards - record producer for Chic Organization Ltd.
- Nile Rodgers - producer for Chic Organization Ltd.
- Bob Clearmountain - sound engineer
- Bill Scheniman - engineer
- Scott Litt - engineer
- Jason Corsaro - assistant engineer
- Jeff Hendrickson - assistant engineer
- Josh Abbey - assistant engineer
- Dave "The Rave" Greenberg - assistant engineer
- Barry Bongiovi - assistant engineer
- Recorded and mixed at Power Station NYC
- Mastered at Atlantic Studios NYC

== Single releases ==
All tracks written by Bernard Edwards and Nile Rodgers.

7" Chic: "Soup For One". Mirage Records (US)/WEA Records (Europe), July 1982.

- "Soup For One" (7" Edit) - 3:08 / "Burn Hard" (7" Edit) - 3:39

12" Chic: "Soup For One". Mirage/WEA, July 1982.

- "Soup For One" (12" Mix) - 7:58 / "Burn Hard" (Album Version) - 5:12

7" Carly Simon: "Why". Mirage/WEA, August 1982.

- "Why" (7" Edit) - 3:33 / "Why" (7" Instrumental) - 3:33

12" Carly Simon/Chic: "Why". Mirage/WEA, August 1982.

- Carly Simon: "Why" (12" Mix) - 8:11 / Chic: "Why" (12" Instrumental) - 7:06
