= I'll Be There (Chic song) =

Single by Chic featuring Nile Rodgers
- Released: March 20, 2015
- Recorded: 2014
- Genre: Disco, dance-pop, electrofunk, house
- Length: 5:13
- Label: Warner Bros Records
- Songwriters: Bernard Edwards; Nile Rodgers
- Producers: Bernard Edwards; Nile Rodgers

Chic singles chronology
""Get Lucky" (with Daft Punk and Pharrell Williams)" (2013)	"I'll Be There" (2015)	"Back In the Old School" (2015)

Nile Rodgers singles chronology
"Number 1" (2014)	"I'll Be There" (2015)	"Magic" (2015)

"I'll Be There" is a song by the band CHIC featuring Nile Rodgers. It was produced by Rodgers and Bernard Edwards. It was intended to be the lead single for the band's album It's About Time, but due to the deaths of Prince and David Bowie, the album changed over the following years. Since Rodgers is the act's founder and only original member, he received billing credit on the song.

== Song background ==
The single pays tribute to the disco era and makes references to Chic-related songs and artists produced by the group. Among the referenced tracks (and acts) mentioned and sampled:

- "Got To Love Somebody" by Sister Sledge (using the song's multiple elements)
- "Everybody Dance" (sampled vocal lyrics)
- "Good Times" (sampled vocal lyrics)
- "We Are Family" by Sister Sledge (Sound effects from the extended version)

== Chart performance ==
The song reached number one on Billboard's Hot Dance Club Songs chart in its June 20, 2015 issue, and was the act's fourth number one overall, and their first number-one single in nearly 23 years when "Chic Mystique" peaked at number one, in 1992.

=== Weekly charts ===
Chart (2015)	Peak position
Belgium (Ultratip Bubbling Under Flanders)	9
Belgium Dance (Ultratop Flanders)	27
Belgium (Ultratip Bubbling Under Wallonia)	8
Belgium Dance Bubbling Under (Ultratop Wallonia)	11
France (SNEP)	78
Israel International Airplay (Media Forest)	1
Japan (ZIP Dance Hits 20)	1
UK Singles (OCC)	68
US Dance Club Songs (Billboard)	1

=== Year-end charts ===
Chart (2015)	Position
US Dance Club Songs (Billboard)	19

== See also ==
- List of number-one dance singles of 2015 (U.S.)
