= Norma Jean Wright =

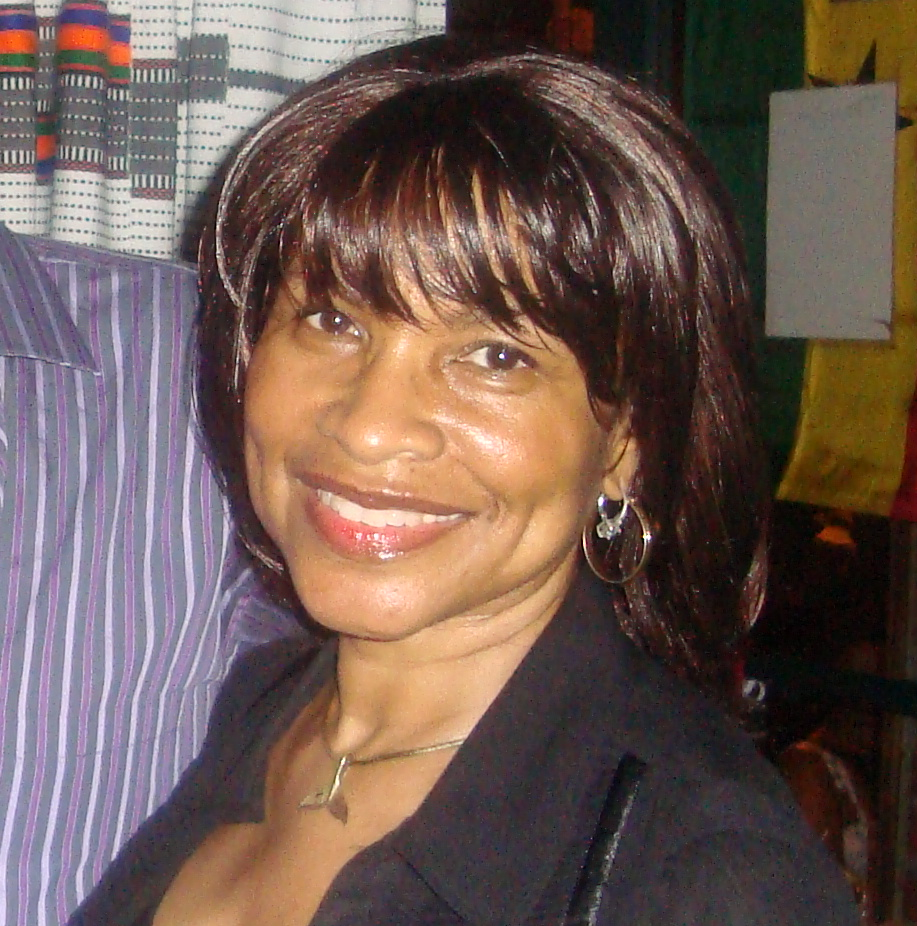
- Wright in 2010

Background information
- Born: July 15, 1950 (age 76); Ripley, Tennessee, U.S.
- Origin: Elyria, Ohio, U.S.
- Genres: Disco, soul, funk
- Occupation: Singer
- Years active: 1976–present
- Website: www.officialnormajeanwright.com

Norma Jean Wright (born July 15, 1950) is an American singer and was the lead vocalist of the American group Chic, a soul, R&B and disco band, from 1977 to 1978.

== Early life ==
Norma Jean Wright was born in Ripley, Tennessee. At young age, she relocated to Elyria, Ohio, with her family. She attended Ohio State University.

== Career ==
Wright sang in the female trio, the Topettes, and toured for a short time with The Spinners. In 1977, she joined Chic, a soul, R&B and disco band.

Most notably, she sang lead vocal on Chic's debut album, Chic (1977), which includes the hits "Dance, Dance, Dance (Yowsah, Yowsah, Yowsah)" (#6 Pop, #6 R&B in January 1978) and "Everybody Dance" (#38 Pop, #12 R&B in April 1978).

She left Chic in 1978 to begin a solo career, billed as Norma Jean. In July 1978, she scored her first R&B Top 20 hit, "Saturday" (#15), from her debut album, Norma Jean on the Bearsville Records label, produced by Bernard Edwards and Nile Rodgers. In January 1980, she scored her second (and last) R&B Top 20 hit, "High Society" (#19), also produced by the Chic team.

Her first album included several popular songs: "Sorcerer", "Having a Party", and "I Like Love." Later popular songs were "Hold Me Lonely Boy" (1979), "Love Attack" (1983), "Shot in the Dark" (1984), and "Every Bit of This Love" (1985). In 2004, "I Like Love" was sampled by the British dance project Solitaire for their club hit "I Like Love (I Love Love)."

Wright has sung as a backing vocalist with C+C Music Factory, Constina, Randy Crawford, Will Downing, Aretha Franklin, Fantasy, Debbie Gibson, Nelson Rangell, Luther Vandross, Madonna, Sister Sledge, Nick Scotti & Freddie Jackson. She frequently appears in a duo with Luci Martin, another former Chic vocalist. In 2018, Wright joined and toured with the female group First Ladies of Disco. In March 2019, Wright released the single "Don't Stop Me Now" with the group.

In 2019, she received The Culture News Award for Lifetime Achievement by David Serero.

In 2024, Norma Jean Wright released her first EP entitled "Living And Loving Life." That same year, she released two new singles, "Around Me" and "In Love Again," written and produced by David Serero.

== Discography ==
=== Studio albums ===
- Norma Jean (1978)

=== EP ===
- Living And Loving Life (2024)

=== Singles ===
Year	Title	Peak chart positions		
Year	Title	US Pop	US R&B	US Dance
1978	"Saturday"	103	15	10
1978	"Sorcerer"	―	―	10
1978	"Having a Party"	―	83	10
1978	"I Like Love"	―	―	10
1979	"High Society"	―	19	92
1983	"Love Attack"	―	―	―
1984	"Shot in the Dark"	―	―	―
1985	"Every Bit of This Love"	―	―	―
2004	"You Lift Me Up"	―	―	―
2024	"Living And Loving Life"	―	―	―
2024	"Around Me"	―	―	―
2024	"In Love Again"	―	―	―
