= Tony Thompson (drummer) =

American drummer (1954–2003)

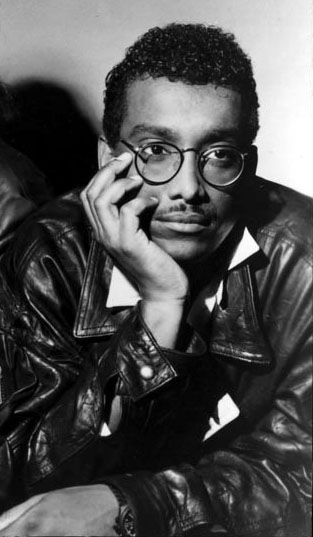
- Promotional photo of Thompson, 1985

Background information
- Born: Anthony Theodore Thompson; November 15, 1954; New York City, U.S.
- Died: November 12, 2003 (aged 48) Los Angeles, California, U.S.
- Genres: New wave, alternative rock, hard rock, pop rock, disco, hip hop, funk, R&B, soul
- Occupation: Drummer

Anthony Theodore Thompson (November 15, 1954 – November 12, 2003) was an American session drummer best known as the drummer of the Power Station and a member of Chic.

== Early life and education ==
Thompson was raised in the middle-class community of Springfield Gardens, in Queens, New York, New York. His mother was Trinidadian and father was of Antiguan descent.

He was influenced to pick up the drums by rock musicians, and was influenced early on by Ringo Starr, Mitch Mitchell, Ginger Baker, and John Bonham, later being influenced by Steve Gadd and Billy Cobham.

== Music career ==
=== Chic ===
Thompson first drummed for the group Labelle, and then for a short while was a member of the soul/disco band Ecstasy, Passion & Pain. This was followed by a long tenure with Chic, where he helped create hits such as "Dance, Dance, Dance (Yowsah, Yowsah, Yowsah)," "Le Freak," and "Good Times". He also performed with members of Chic on "We Are Family" and "He's the Greatest Dancer" by Sister Sledge and "Upside Down" and "I'm Coming Out" by Diana Ross.

Following the temporary disbanding of Chic in 1983, Chic's former guitarist and bassist, Nile Rodgers and Bernard Edwards became prolific producers, and Thompson's drumming was much in demand among their clients. Thompson appeared with numerous artists such as Jody Watley, Madonna (on her 1984 album Like a Virgin), Rod Stewart, Robert Palmer and David Bowie.

=== Other bands ===
Thompson was also a member of the band the Power Station along with Robert Palmer, and John Taylor and Andy Taylor of Duran Duran. The Live Aid charity benefit concert in 1985 saw Thompson playing with the Power Station as well as joining the remaining members of Led Zeppelin on stage (along with Phil Collins) at John F. Kennedy Stadium. Page, Plant and Jones then invited Thompson in England for rehearsals for a Led Zeppelin reunion which was canceled by Jimmy Page after Thompson was badly injured in a car crash.

He went on to join groups such as the Distance and Crown of Thorns with Jean Beauvoir (playing on their first album Crown of Thorns before leaving the band and subsequently replaced by Hawk Lopez). Thompson was also a founding member of the band That Hideous Strength. In the mid-1990s he rejoined Power Station for their 1996 reunion album Living in Fear and subsequent tour. Thompson's final project was called Non-Toxic which he formed with bassist Michael Paige (Crown of Thorns) and guitarist Dave Scott and Vocalist John Zarifis; Thompson died before finishing the project's first album.

He played with David Bowie on the Serious Moonlight Tour.

== Death and legacy ==
Thompson died, aged 48, on November 12, 2003, in Los Angeles, within a month of being diagnosed with renal cell carcinoma (kidney cancer), two months after the death of the Power Station bandmate Robert Palmer from a heart attack. Thompson was a member of the band Non-Toxic at the time of his death. He was survived by his wife, two children, and his sister, Cookie. On September 19, 2005, like his former band member Bernard Edwards, Thompson was honoured posthumously along with the rest of the Chic band members by being inducted into the Dance Music Hall of Fame.

== Discography ==
=== with Chic ===
- Chic (1977)
- C'est Chic (1978)
- Risqué (1979)
- Real People (1980)
- Take It Off (1981)
- Tongue in Chic (1982)
- Believer (1983)

=== with Sister Sledge ===
- We Are Family (1979)
- Love Somebody Today (1980)

=== with Diana Ross ===
- Diana (1980)

with Madonna

- Like A Virgin (1984)

=== with Power Station ===
- The Power Station (1985)
- Living in Fear (1996)

=== with Distance ===
- Under the One Sky (1989)

=== with Crown of Thorns ===
- The Black CD EP (1991)
- Crown of Thorns (1994)

=== Guest appearances ===
- Debbie Harry (Artist) KooKoo (Album) (1981)
- David Bowie (Artist) Let’s Dance (Album) (1983)
- The Serious Moonlight Tour (performed live with David Bowie) (1983)
- "Like a Virgin", "Material Girl", "Love Don’t Live Here Anymore", "Shoo-Bee-Doo" (from the Madonna album, Like a Virgin) (1984)
- "Rock and Roll", "Whole Lotta Love", "Stairway to Heaven" (performed live with Led Zeppelin & Phil Collins at Live Aid) (1985)
- Belouis Some (Artist) Some People (Album) (1985)
- "Hard Woman" (from the Mick Jagger album, She's the Boss) (1985)
- "Hyperactive", "Addicted To Love", "I Didn't Mean to Turn You On", "Riptide" (from the Robert Palmer album, Riptide) (1985)
- "Lost in You", "Forever Young", "The Wild Horse", "Dynamite", "Try a Little Tenderness", "When I Was Your Man" (from the Rod Stewart album, Out of Order) (1988)
- Adam Ant (Artist) Persuasion (Adam Ant album) (Album) (1992)
- "I Wanna Take You Higher" (from the Duran Duran album, Thank You) (1995)
- "What It Takes" (with Bobby Kimball from the compilation album, Tribute to Aerosmith: Let the Tribute Do the Talkin') (2001)
- The Fragile (Nine Inch Nails)
- Material (Artist) One Down (Album)(1982)

== Film appearances ==
- Appeared with Distance as the club band in the Whoopi Goldberg movie, Burglar (1987)
