= Stage Fright (Chic song) =

Single by Chic

from the album Take It Off
- Released: December 1981
- Recorded: 1981
- Genre: Funk
- Length: 3:39
- Label: Atlantic 3887
- Songwriter(s): Bernard Edwards; Nile Rodgers
- Producer(s): Bernard Edwards; Nile Rodgers

Chic singles chronology
"Real People" (1980)	"Stage Fright" (1981)	"Soup for One" (1982)

"Stage Fright" is the first and only single taken from Chic's fifth studio album Take It Off. The song features a solo lead vocal by Luci Martin.

== Reception ==
Record World said that "the recurring chorus hook and a kinetic rhythm section surround Luci Martin's lead vocal enthusiasm."

== Chart positions ==
Chart (1981)	Peak position
U.S. Billboard Hot Black Singles	34

== Track listings ==
Atlantic 7" 3887, 1981

- A. "Stage Fright" (7" Edit) - 3:39
- B. "So Fine" - 4:10

Atlantic promo 12" DMD 306, 1981

- A. "Stage Fright" 3:55
- B. "So Fine" - 4:10
