= A Night in Amsterdam =

Live album by Chic
- Released: June 20, 2006
- Recorded: 2005
- Genre: Disco, funk, R&B, jazz, samba
- Label: Universe Italy
- Producer: Nile Rodgers Stephen Singer

Chic chronology
Live at the Budokan (1999)	A Night in Amsterdam (2006)	It's About Time (2018)

Professional ratings
Review scores
Source	Rating
Allmusic	

A Night in Amsterdam is a CD/DVD live album by American R&B band Chic, released in 2006.
The album was recorded at Amsterdam's Paradiso on July 17, 2005 and features Nile Rodgers and the current formation of the band performing Chic's best known songs as well as tracks from the albums written and produced for Sister Sledge and Diana Ross. The album was re-released as Greatest Hits Live in Concert in 2006.

== Track listing ==
All songs written by Bernard Edwards and Nile Rodgers unless otherwise noted.

=== CD ===
1. "Intro" – 1:58
2. "Everybody Dance" – 5:57
3. "I Want Your Love" – 8:57
4. "I'm Coming Out" – 3:28
5. "Upside Down" – 1:56
6. "He's the Greatest Dancer" – 2:31
7. "We Are Family" – 7:46
8. "At Last I Am Free" – 12:59
9. "My Forbidden Lover" – 5:44
10. "Le Freak" – 9:42
11. "Good Times" – 9:24
12. "Chic Cheer" – 8:55

=== DVD ===
1. "Everybody Dance"
2. "Dance Dance Dance (Yowsah Yowsah Yowsah)" (Edwards, Lehman, Rodgers)
3. "I Want Your Love"
4. "Diana Ross Medley: I'm Coming Out/Upside Down/Sister Sledge Medley: He's The Greatest Dancer/We Are Family"
5. "At Last I Am Free"
6. "Thinking of You"
7. "Meet the Band/Jam with Chic"
8. "My Forbidden Lover"
9. "Le Freak"
10. "Good Times"
11. Bonus Material
