= Soup for One (song) =

Single by Chic

from the album Soup for One (soundtrack)
- B-side: "Burn Hard"
- Released: 1982
- Genre: Funk rock, post-disco
- Length: 5:35 (album version); 3:08 (single version)
- Label: Mirage
- Songwriters: Bernard Edwards; Nile Rodgers
- Producers: Bernard Edwards; Nile Rodgers

Chic singles chronology
"Stage Fright" (1981)	"Soup for One" (1982)	"Hangin'" (1982)

"Soup for One" is a song performed by the band Chic. The song is written in A minor and is featured on the soundtrack album Soup for One. The song went to No. 14 on the Billboard Soul singles chart and No. 80 on the Hot 100.

== Personnel ==
- Bernard Edwards - lead vocals, bass
- Nile Rodgers - electric guitar, backing vocals
- Tony Thompson - drums
- Luci Martin - backing vocals
- Alfa Anderson - backing vocals

Additional personnel

- Raymond Jones - synthesizer
- Andy Schwartz - synthesizer, electric piano

== Track listings ==
US Mirage 7", WTG 4032 (1982)

- A. "Soup for One" (edit) - 3:08
- B. "Burn Hard" (edit) - 3:39

US Mirage 12", DM 4827 (1982)

- A. "Soup for One" (extended) - 7:58
- B. "Burn Hard" (album version) - 5:12

== Chart positions ==
Chart (1982)	Peak position
US Billboard Hot 100	80
US Billboard Hot Soul Singles	14

== Sampling ==
In 2000, the song was sampled by French house duo Modjo for their single "Lady (Hear Me Tonight)". Since 2009, Chic has added the song to their concert setlist, which is often performed as a mash-up with "Soup for One".
