= Rebels Are We =

Single by Chic

from the album Real People
- B-side: "Open Up"
- Released: July 1980
- Recorded: 1980
- Genre: Disco, funk, new wave
- Length: 5:20 (album version); 3:19 (single version)
- Label: Atlantic 3665
- Songwriters: Bernard Edwards, Nile Rodgers
- Producers: Bernard Edwards, Nile Rodgers

Chic singles chronology
"My Feet Keep Dancing" (1979)	"Rebels Are We" (1980)	"Real People" (1980)

"Rebels Are We" is a song by American R&B band Chic. It was the first single from their fourth studio album, 1980's Real People. The song, featuring a solo lead vocal by Luci Martin, marked a change of direction for the band; incorporating harder rock/new wave elements into their signature funk sound. The song peaked at number 8 on Billboard's "Hot Soul/Black Singles" chart and number 61 on Billboard's "Hot 100" chart). The song has been included in many compilation albums such as The Best of Chic, Volume 2 and The Very Best of Chic.

Record World said that "Luci Martin's vocal is superb."

== Track listings ==
Atlantic 7" 3665 June 13 1980

- A. "Rebels Are We" (7" Edit) - 3:19
- B. "Open Up" 3:58

Atlantic promo 12" DMD 241, 1980

- A. "Rebels Are We" - 4:53
- B. "Rebels Are We" (7" Edit) - 3:19

== Chart positions ==
Chart (1980)	Peak position
US Billboard Hot 100	61
U.S. Billboard Disco Top 100	29
U.S. Billboard Hot Soul Singles	8
