= Sammy Figueroa =

American percussionist (born 1948)

- Born: November 16, 1948 (age 77); The Bronx, New York, United States
- Genres: Jazz, Afro-Cuban jazz, Latin jazz, world fusion, jazz fusion, soul, funk, disco
- Occupation: Percussionist
- Years active: 1967–present
- Website: Official website

Sammy Figueroa (born November 16, 1948) is an American percussionist of Puerto Rican descent. At 18, he joined the band of bassist Bobby Valentín and also co-led the Brazilian-Latin fusion group Raíces. He is known as an extremely prolific session player, having played on nearly 400 albums, including ten platinum records.

== Early years ==
Figueroa was born in the Bronx in 1948. He started singing at an early age, following in the footsteps of his father, Charlie Figueroa, whom he never met. However, Sammy later decided that he wanted to be an instrumentalist. By his teenage years, he was focusing almost entirely on percussion. Figueroa moved to Puerto Rico as a child to live with his grandparents amidst rising gang violence in The Bronx and, at 17 years old, joined the band Raíces (not to be confused with the Argentinian rock band of the same name).

== Move back to New York ==
Raíces had a difficult time making a name for themselves and Figueroa left the group and returned to New York City, where he took a job at a Sam Goody record store. Figueroa eventually rejoined Raíces and recorded an album with them in Miami, but moved back to New York again when the group broke up a few years later. While working at the record store, Figueroa met prominent jazz flutist Herbie Mann, who was impressed by Figueroa’s knowledge of music and record recommendations. Upon learning that Figueroa was a percussionist, Mann invited him to sit in at a club gig and, later, offered him a spot in his band. Soon thereafter, Figueroa began working with Average White Band, The Brecker Brothers, and The Mahavishnu Orchestra.

== Session work ==
Figueroa soon became one of the 'top calls' in New York as a session percussionist. Over the course of his career, he worked with a wide range of jazz, rock, pop, soul, fusion, and Latin musicians, including Miles Davis, Sonny Rollins, George Benson, Chet Baker, Al Foster, Stanley Clarke, Art Farmer, Quincy Jones, Grover Washington Jr., Houston Person, Al Jarreau, Lena Horne, Joe Williams, Tony Williams, Stanley Turrentine, Freddie Hubbard, Arturo Sandoval, Dave Weckl, John Scofield, Don Cherry, Yoko Ono, Pat Metheny, Vinnie Colaiuta, Steve Gadd, Jaco Pastorius, Aretha Franklin, Diana Ross, Dionne Warwick, Whitney Houston, Ben E. King, Peter Tosh, Chaka Khan, Mariah Carey, Mick Jagger, David Bowie, The Bee Gees, Blondie, Bette Middler, Celine Dion, Patti Smith, Narada Michael Walden, David Lee Roth, Roberta Flack, Sister Sledge, Tom Jones, James Taylor, Carole King, Natalie Merchant, Luther Vandross, Anita Baker, Joe Cocker, Stevie Ray Vaughan, Steven Van Zandt, Ashford & Simpson, Hall & Oates, Gladys Knight & The Pips, Chic, The Yellowjackets, Steve Winwood, Fabrizio Sotti, Nestor Torres, Chico O’Farrell, Paquito D’Rivera, Ruben Blades, Eddie Palmieri, Rafel Cortijo, Tania Maria, and many others.

== Move to Miami and solo career ==
In 1989, Figueroa met producer Rachel Faro at a benefit for Pat Mikell, co-proprietor of Mikell’s jazz club. The two became a production team and went on to produce various Cuban and Puerto Rican artists and bands including Lazaro Roz con Mezcla, Fania All-Star Yomo Toro, a capella group Vocal Sampling, and fusion band Cuarto Espacio. Faro founded the label Ashé Records in 1998 and moved the label to Miami shortly after. Figueroa followed her there in 2002, quickly forming the band Sammy Figueroa and His Latin Jazz Explosion, which debuted at the 2002 Hollywood (Florida) Jazz Festival and held a regular performance slot at the Van Dyke Café in Miami Beach for several years. Figueroa also leads Sally’s Tomato, a Cal Tjader tribute group, as a side project. He has cited Bill Fitch, who played conga with Tjader, as a longtime influence on his own playing. To date, Figueroa has released seven albums as a band leader or co-leader. His most recent album Searching For A Memory/Busco Tu Recuerdo (Ashe, 2023) a tribute to his father, was produced by Faro with Cuban pianist Gonzalo Rubalcaba and Cuban singer Aymée Nuviola. The production was made possible by a Creativity Residency Grant from SouthArts Jazz Road initiative. In 2024, the album was nominated for a Latin Grammy in the category of "Best Latin Jazz/Jazz Album."

== Awards ==
Figueroa's first two solo albums, "...and Sammy Walked In" (Savant, 2006, SCD 2066) and "The Magician" (Savant, 2007, SCD 2079) were nominated for the Grammy for 'Best Latin Jazz Album'. In September 2024, "Searching For A Memory/Busco Tu Recuerdo" (Ashé, 2023, received a Latin Grammy Nomination for "Best Jazz/Latin Jazz Album." By the time it received its Latin Grammy nomination, "Searching For A Memory/Busco Tu Recuerdo" had already received a "Production of the Year" award from Puerto Rico's Fundacion Nacional para La Cultura Popular six months prior.

Figueroa has also been awarded three Recording Academy (NARAS) awards for 'Percussionist of the Year,' the title of "Best Jazz Artist" in the Miami New Times "Best Of Miami" awards in 2003, and a Drum! Magazine "Drummie" Award for "Best Jazz Fusion Percussionist" in 2008. He received a Jazz Journalists Association award in 2012 and was a runner-up for another in 2015.

== Gear ==
Figueroa endorses Pearl percussion, Sabian cymbals, Vic Firth drumsticks, and Shure microphones. His gear setup includes:

- Pearl Elite Congas:
  - 11x30” Quinto
  - 11.75x30” Conga
  - 12.5x30” Tumba
- Pearl Marc Quiñones Timbales
- Pearl Elite Bongos
- Sabian 17” HHX Special FX Thin Hand Crash
- Sabian 14” HHX Special FX Thin Splash
- Pearl PBL-30 Clave Block
- Pearl New Yorker Cha Cha Bell
- Pearl 32-Bar Chimes
- Pearl Shekere
- Pearl Maracas
- Pearl Cabasa
- Pearl Guiro

== Selected discography ==
=== As leader or co-leader ===
Solo

- Talisman (Savant, 2014, SCD 2144) with Glaucia Nasser
- Memory of Water (Ashé, 2015)
- Imaginary World (Savant, 2015, SCD 2151)
- Searching For A Memory/Busco Tu Recuerdo (Ashe, 2023)

With Sammy Figueroa & His Latin Jazz Explosion

- ...and Sammy Walked In (Savant, 2006, SCD 2066)
- The Magician (Savant, 2007, SCD 2079)
- Urban Nature (Senator, 2011, SEN-1001)

With Raíces

- Raíces (Nemperor, 1975)

=== As sideman ===
With Ashford & Simpson

- Solid (Capitol, 1984)
- Real Love (Capitol, 1986)

With Average White Band

- AWB (Atlantic, 1974)
- Cupid's in Fashion (RCA, 1982)
- Soul Tattoo (Harbour, 1996)

With Bee Gees

- E.S.P. (Warner Bros., 1987)

With George Benson

- In Your Eyes (Warner Bros., 1983)

With Blondie

- The Hunter (Chrysalis, 1982)

With Blues Traveler

- Straight On till Morning (A&M, 1997)

With Tommy Bolin

- Teaser (Nemperor, 1975)

With David Bowie

- Let's Dance (EMI, 1983)
- Tonight (EMI, 1984)

With The Brecker Brothers

- Back to Back (Arista, 1976)
- Don't Stop the Music (Arista, 1977)
- Straphangin' (Arista, 1981)

With Paul Carrack

- Groove Approved (Chrysalis, 1989)

With Don Cherry

- Hear And Now (Atlantic, 1976)

With Chic

- Chic (Atlantic, 1977)
- C'est Chic (Atlantic, 1978)
- Risqué (Atlantic, 1979)
- Real People (Atlantic, 1980)
- Take It Off (Atlantic, 1981)
- Tongue in Chic (Atlantic, 1982)

With Joe Cocker

- Unchain My Heart (Capitol, 1987)

With Miles Davis

- The Man with the Horn (Columbia, 1981)

With Joey DeFrancesco

- Where Were You? (Columbia, 1990)
- In the Key of the Universe (Mack Avenue, 2019)

With Deodato

- Very Together (MCA, 1976)

With Will Downing

- Invitation Only (Mercury Records, 1997)

With Paquito D'Rivera

- Havana Café (Chesky, 1991)

With Enchantment

- Enchanted Lady (Columbia, 1982)

With Al Foster

- Mr. Foster (Better Days, 1979)

With Nnenna Freelon

- Maiden Voyage (Concord, 1998)

With Hiroshi Fukumura

- Hot Shot (Morning, 1985)

With Debbie Gibson

- Body, Mind, Soul (Atlantic, 1993)

With Dave Grusin

- West Side Story (DTS, 1997)

With Gwen Guthrie

- Just for You (Island, 1985)

With Hall & Oates

- Ooh Yeah! (Arista, 1988)

With Major Harris

- How Do You Take Your Love (RCA Victor, 1978)

With Debbie Harry

- KooKoo (Chrysalis, 1981)

With Nicole Henry

- The Very Thought of You (Banister, 2008)

With Whitney Houston

- Whitney (Arista, 1987)

With Grayson Hugh

- Road to Freedom (MCA, 1992)

With Dr. John

- Anutha Zone (Parlophone, 1998)

With Etta Jones

- Christmas with Etta Jones (Muse, 1990)
- Reverse the Charges (Muse, 1992)

With France Joli

- Now! (Prelude, 1982)

With Stanley Jordan

- Magic Touch (Blue Note, 1985)

With Chaka Khan

- Chaka (Warner Bros., 1979)
- Naughty (Warner Bros., 1980)
- Chaka Khan (Warner Bros., 1982)

With Ben E. King

- Music Trance (Atlantic, 1980)

With Carole King

- City Streets (Capitol, 1989)

With Morgana King

- Everything Must Change (Muse, 1979)

With Earl Klugh

- Crazy For You (Nautilus, 1981)
- Wishful Thinking (Capitol, 1986)

With Gladys Knight & the Pips

- Touch (Columbia, 1981)

With Jean Knight

- Keep It Comin (Cotillion, 1981)

With Melissa Manchester

- Hey Ricky (Arista, 1982)

With Herbie Mann

- Surprises (Atlantic, 1976)
- Mellow (Atlantic, 1981)
- Peace Pieces - The Music of Bill Evans (Lightyear, 1995)

With Jay McShann

- The Big Apple Bash (Arista, 1979)

With Bette Midler

- Thighs and Whispers (Atlantic, 1979)

With Stephanie Mills

- Tantalizingly Hot (Casablanca, 1982)

With Charles Mingus

- Me, Myself an Eye (Atlantic, 1979) (Mingus does not play on this posthumous recording)

With Bob Mintzer Big Band

- Departure (DMP, 1993)

With Idris Muhammad

- Boogie To The Top (Kudu, 1978)

With Mark Murphy

- What a Way to Go (Muse, 1990)
- I'll Close My Eyes (Muse, 1991)

With Odyssey

- Hang Together (RCA Victor, 1980)

With Yoko Ono

- It's Alright (I See Rainbows) (Polydor, 1982)

With John Pizzarelli

- Meets the Beatles (RCA, 1998)

With Jimmy Ponder

- Come On Down (Muse, 1991)

With Sonny Rollins

- Road Shows, Vol. 1 (Doxy/EmArcy, 2008)
- Road Shows, Vol. 2 (Doxy/EmArcy, 2011)
- Road Shows, Vol. 3 (Doxy/EmArcy, 2014)

With David Lee Roth

- Crazy from the Heat (Warner Bros., 1985)
- Eat 'Em and Smile (Warner Bros., 1986)

With Diana Ross

- The Boss (Motown, 1979)
- Red Hot Rhythm & Blues (EMI, 1987)

With Leo Sayer

- World Radio (Chrysalis, 1982)

With John Scofield

- Who's Who? (Arista/Norvus, 1979)

With Sister Sledge

- We Are Family (Cotillion, 1979)
- Love Somebody Today (Cotillion, 1980)

With O. C. Smith

- After All Is Said and Done (Triune, 1993)

With Patti Smith

- Dream of Life (Arista, 1988)

With Spyro Gyra

- Three Wishes (GRP, 1992)

With Billy Squier

- Tell the Truth (Capitol, 1993)

With Candi Staton

- Candi Staton (Warner Bros., 1980)

With Peter Tosh

- Mystic Man (EMI, 1979)

With Luther Vandross

- Forever, for Always, for Love (Epic, 1982)

With Narada Michael Walden

- Garden of Love Light (Arista, 1976)
- I Cry, I Smile (Arista, 1977)

With Dionne Warwick

- How Many Times Can We Say Goodbye (Arista, 1983)

With Steven Van Zandt

- Men Without Women (EMI, 1982)
