= Robert Sabino =

- Born: New York City, U.S.
- Genres: Disco; rock
- Occupations: Musician; composer
- Instrument: Keyboards

Robert Sabino is an American rock keyboardist. He was born and raised in the Bronx on Decatur Avenue. Although classically trained, he became a rock performer.

In 1975, Sabino became a professional composer and session keyboardist, most notably recording and touring with artists such as Bryan Adams, Laurie Anderson, Ashford & Simpson, Philip Bailey, Jeff Beck, David Bowie, Kim Carnes, Rosanne Cash, Chic, Rodney Crowell, Peter Frampton, Ace Frehley (Kiss), Art Garfunkel, Herbie Hancock, Debbie Harry, Warren Haynes (Allman Brothers Band), Mick Jagger, Mick Jones, Madonna, Johnny Mathis, Tim Moore, Odyssey, Teddy Pendergrass, Power Station, Diana Ross, Todd Rundgren, John Sebastian, Nick Seeger, Charlie Sexton, Jules Shear, The Simms Brothers Band, Carly Simon, Paul Simon, Simon and Garfunkel, Sister Sledge, Chris Spedding, Fonzi Thornton, Tin Huey, and Steve Winwood. He was also a permanent member of the disco group Chic, playing on such records as "Dance Dance Dance" and "Le Freak". He also played on such records Sister Sledge's "We Are Family" and playing keyboards and synths on Madonna's Like a Virgin album.

Throughout the 1980s, he toured and wrote songs for these musicians. He wrote songs for the Care Bears soundtrack with John Sebastian, and wrote tracks for Peter Frampton. He last toured with Todd Rundgren in 1991 on his "2nd Wind" tour.

Sabino is the musical director of his local church, Holy Trinity Parish, and teaches a rock history class at UC Davis. He also teaches both kids and adults choir at Holy Trinity School while teaching about music and doing liturgical band.

For more than a decade Sabino has been a member of the Ain't Got No Time (Blues and Rock) Band. Featuring musicians Matt Retz, Ben Retz, Eric Rosander, Dave Manoucheri, Kevin Mooney and Sabino. He has recorded two albums with the band, "Wind of Change" (2024) and "One Rough Year" (2025). He is also the keyboardist on a solo album by the guitarist Dave Manoucheri called "When the Giants Fell" (2019) and on Manoucheri's "Songs for the Sheik" (2025) in tribute to his father, Jeff Manoucheri.
