= Real People (song) =

Single by Chic

from the album Real People
- Released: 1980
- Recorded: 1980
- Genre: Disco, soul, rock
- Length: 5:20 (album version); 3:45 (single version)
- Label: Atlantic 3768
- Songwriters: Bernard Edwards, Nile Rodgers
- Producers: Bernard Edwards, Nile Rodgers

Chic singles chronology
"Rebels Are We" (1980)	"Real People" (1980)	"Stage Fright" (1981)

Professional ratings
Review scores
Source	Rating
Billboard	(unrated)

"Real People" is a song from American band Chic's fourth album Real People. It was the second single from this album and like its predecessor, featured a solo lead vocal by Luci Martin.

== Background ==
Exploring new directions in the post-Disco era, Chic continued incorporating harder rock elements into their sound as evident by Nile Rodgers' blaring guitar solos which kick-off and end the song. Audiences were caught off guard by the new Chic sound. Prompting some radio programmers to flip the single and play the more upbeat/danceable B-side "Chip Off The Old Block" instead of the A-side. This, combined with other factors, resulted in the single not making much impact on the charts.

== Reception ==
Record World said it has "impeccable" taste, "stylish production," "topical lyrics," "a sweltering guitar solo" and "vocal perfection."

== Chart performance ==
"Real People" only peaked at number 51 on Billboard's "Hot Soul/Black Singles" chart and number 79 on Billboard's "Hot 100" chart. It failed to chart in the UK, as the song "26" was released as a single, in lieu of "Real People".

== Track listings ==
Atlantic 3768, September 29, 1980

- A. "Real People" (7" Edit) - 3:45
- B. "Chip Off The Old Block" - 4:56

Atlantic promo 12" DMD 247, 1980

- A. "Real People" - 5:20
- B. "Real People" (7" Edit) - 3:45
