= Le Freak =

1978 song by Chic

- One of the US editions

Single by Chic

from the album C'est Chic
- B-side: "You Can Get By"; "Savoir Faire"
- Released: September 21, 1978
- Recorded: January 1978
- Studio: Power Station, New York City
- Genre: Disco; funk
- Length: 5:23 (LP version); 3:30 (7-inch/video edit)
- Label: Atlantic (3519)
- Songwriters: Bernard Edwards; Nile Rodgers
- Producers: Bernard Edwards; Nile Rodgers

Chic singles chronology
"Everybody Dance" (1978)	"Le Freak" (1978)	"I Want Your Love" (1979)

Music video
- "Le Freak" on YouTube

"Le Freak" is a funk-disco song by American disco band Chic, released in September 1978 by Atlantic Records as the first single from their second album, C'est Chic (1978). It was written and produced by Bernard Edwards and Nile Rodgers, and became the band's third single and first US Billboard Hot 100 and R&B number-one hit song. Along with the tracks "I Want Your Love" and "Chic Cheer", "Le Freak" scored number one on the disco charts for seven weeks. The single achieved sales of 7 million and also peaked at number seven in the UK Singles Chart. Billboard magazine ranked it as the number three song for 1979 and number 21 on the magazine's top 100 songs of the first 55 years of the Hot 100. In 2018, "Le Freak" was selected for preservation in the National Recording Registry by the Library of Congress as being "culturally, historically, or aesthetically significant".

== Lyrics ==
The lyrics mention "Stompin' at the Savoy", a 1933 song composed by Edgar Sampson. They also invite the listener to "Come on down to 54", referencing Studio 54, which was a popular New York City nightclub at the time. In the repeated line "Le freak, c'est chic", the chorus provides the album title.

== History ==
This song commemorates Studio 54 in New York City for its notoriously long customer waiting lines, exclusive clientele, and discourteous doormen. According to guitarist Nile Rodgers, the song was devised during New Year's Eve 1977, as a result of his and bassist Bernard Edwards' being refused entrance to Studio 54, where they had been invited by Grace Jones, due to her failure to notify the nightclub's staff. He said the lyrics of the refrain were originally "Fuck off!" rather than "Freak out!"; for the documentary How to Make It in the Music Business, he said that "fuck off" was what the doorman had said to him when he slammed the door on them; first it was changed to "freak off" after Rodgers mused that they would not be able to say "fuck off" on the radio, but that sounded "terrible", so he changed it to "freak out". This song is written in the key of A minor.

"Le Freak" was the first song to score the number one position on the Billboard Hot 100 three separate times. It spent a total of six non-consecutive weeks at the position.

In 1987, an acid house-styled re-mix was issued under the title "Jack Le Freak". It reached number 18 in the United Kingdom, becoming Chic's last top 40 hit to date in that country. This remix was done by British producer Phil Harding, who had access to the original DAT tapes for "Le Freak". Due to him producing a similar remix for Mel and Kim's "F.L.M." (known as the "Two Grooves Under One Nation" remix, which samples "Le Freak") that same year, he included a cappella samples taken from their songs "Showing Out (Get Fresh at the Weekend)", "Respectable" and "F.L.M." during the breakdown.

MC Lyte sampled the song "Woo Woo (Freak Out)" featuring Nicci Gilbert of the group Brownstone, which first appeared on the soundtrack to the 1998 movie Woo and was also included on her album Seven & Seven, titled "Woo Woo (Party Time)", which released three months later.

== Reception and legacy ==
Upon the release, Cash Box described it as "a handclapping disco song bolstered by solid bass work and airy vocals." In 2000, VH1 ranked "Le Freak" No. 26 in their list of "100 Greatest Dance Songs". In 2012, Rolling Stone ranked it No. 10 in their list of "The Best Disco Songs of All Time". In 2013, the song was ranked No. 21 on Billboard magazine's top 100 songs of the first 55 years of the Hot 100 chart. In 2015, the 1978 recording of the song by Chic on Atlantic Records was inducted into the Grammy Hall of Fame. In 2018, it was selected for preservation in the National Recording Registry by the Library of Congress as being "culturally, historically, or aesthetically significant". In 2022, Rolling Stone ranked "Le Freak" No. 81 in their "200 Greatest Dance Songs of All Time" list. In 2024, Forbes ranked it No. 27 in their list of "The 30 Greatest Disco Songs of All Time".

== Track listing and formats ==
- Atlantic 7" 3519, September 21, 1978

A. "Le Freak" (7" Edit) – 3:30
B. "Savoir Faire" – 4:57

- Atlantic promo 12" DSKO 131, 1978 / Atlantic 12" DK 4700, 1978

A. "Le Freak" – 5:23
B. "Savoir Faire" – 4:57

- Atlantic 12" DK 4620, 1978 / Atlantic Oldies promo 12" DSKO 178, 1979

A. "Le Freak" – 5:23
B. "You Can Get By" – 5:36

== Personnel ==
- Alfa Anderson – lead vocals
- Diva Gray – lead vocals
- David Lasley – vocals
- Luci Martin – vocals
- Luther Vandross – vocals
- Nile Rodgers – guitar, vocals
- Raymond Jones or Andy Schwartz – Fender Rhodes electric piano
- Robert Sabino – acoustic piano, clavinet, electric piano
- Bernard Edwards – bass guitar, vocals
- Tony Thompson – drums
- Sammy Figueroa – percussion
- The Chic Strings:
  - Marianne Carroll – violin
  - Cheryl Hong – violin
  - Karen Milne – violin
- Gene Orloff – concert master

Production staff

- Nile Rodgers - producer
- Bernard Edwards - producer
- Bob Clearmountain - engineer

== Charts ==
=== Weekly charts ===
Chart (1978–1979)	Peak position
Australia (Kent Music Report)	1
Austria (Ö3 Austria Top 40)	6
Belgium (Ultratop 50 Flanders)	2
Canada Top Singles (RPM)	1
Canada Adult Contemporary (RPM)	1
Canada Dance Songs (RPM)	1
Canada Top 15 12inch (RPM)	1
France (SNEP)	2
Ireland (IRMA)	20
Netherlands (Dutch Top 40)	2
Netherlands (Single Top 100)	5
New Zealand (Recorded Music NZ)	1
Norway (VG-lista)	9
South Africa (Springbok Radio)	1
Sweden (Sverigetopplistan)	6
Switzerland (Schweizer Hitparade)	2
UK Singles (OCC)	7
US Billboard Hot 100	1
US Adult Contemporary (Billboard)	48
US Hot Soul Singles (Billboard)	1
US Dance Club Songs (Billboard) (with "I Want Your Love" and "Chic Cheer")	1
US Cash Box Top 100	1
West Germany (GfK)	5

Chart (1987) (Jack Le Freak)	Peak position
Ireland (IRMA)	13
UK Singles (OCC)	19
US Dance Club Songs (Billboard)	15
US Dance/Electronic Singles Sales (Billboard)	21
Chart (2013)	Peak position
France (SNEP)	192

=== Year-end charts ===
Chart (1978)	Ranking
Canada Top Singles (RPM)	132

Chart (1979)	Ranking
Australia (Kent Music Report)	8
Canada Top Singles (RPM)	42
New Zealand (Recorded Music NZ)	8
South Africa (Springbok Radio)	8
US Billboard Hot 100	3
US Cash Box Top 100	1

=== All-time charts ===
Chart (1958–2018)	Position
US Billboard Hot 100	24

== Certifications ==
Region	Certification	Certified units/sales
Canada (Music Canada)	2× Platinum	448,000
France (SNEP)	Gold	500,000^{*}
Italy (FIMI)	Gold	50,000^{‡}
New Zealand (RMNZ)	Platinum	30,000^{‡}
United Kingdom (BPI)	Platinum	600,000^{‡}
United States (RIAA)	5× Platinum	4,000,000
Summaries
Worldwide	—	7,000,000
^{*} Sales figures based on certification alone.^{‡} Sales+streaming figures based on certification alone.

== In popular culture ==
This song was used in a 2010 film Toy Story 3 scene in which Ken models his outfits for Barbie. This song was also used in the 2010 film Diary of a Wimpy Kid during the Mother and Son Sweetheart Dance scene. It was also heard in the 2004 film Shrek 2, when the fairytale creatures were partying in Shrek's Swamp. This song also appears in the 1995 film Heavyweights during one of Tony Perkis’ exercise regimens with the struggling campers. It is also used in Walmart commercials. The song also appears in the video game Just Dance (2009). It is also parodied in Great Wolf Lodge commercials as part of their "Wolf Out!" advertising campaign.

== See also ==
- List of Billboard number-one disco singles of 1978

== Bibliography ==
- Bronson, Fred (1997). The Billboard Book of Number One Hits. Billboard Books. ISBN 9780823076413.
