= Take It Off (album) =

Studio album by Chic
- Released: November 16, 1981
- Recorded: 1981
- Studio: Power Station, New York City
- Genre: Post-disco, funk
- Label: Atlantic
- Producer: Nile Rodgers, Bernard Edwards

Chic chronology
Real People (1980)	Take It Off (1981)	Soup for One (1982)

Singles from Take It Off
- 1. "Stage Fright" Released: December 1981

Take It Off is the fifth studio album by American band Chic. It was released on Atlantic Records in November 16, 1981. It includes the single "Stage Fright", which reached number 35 on the US R&B chart, but was the first Chic single failing to enter the US Pop charts, and this album only proved to be moderately successful as well, stalling at number 124 on the US albums chart and number 36 on the R&B chart.

Take It Off was one of three albums written and produced by Bernard Edwards and Nile Rodgers in 1981, the other two being Blondie lead singer Debbie Harry's debut solo album Koo Koo and Johnny Mathis' I Love My Lady.

Take It Off was transferred to CD and re-released by Atlantic Records/Warner Music in 1991. It was digitally remastered and reissued by Wounded Bird Records in 2006.

== Reception ==
Professional ratings
Review scores
Source	Rating
AllMusic	3/5 stars
Robert Christgau	A−
The Rolling Stone Album Guide	4/5 stars

Writing in The Boston Phoenix, Milo Miles said that the album "marks the welcome return of Chic as a team. ... In a period of black music dominated by sporadic upheavals of singles from the underground and cautiously bland albums from the mainstream, Take It Off stands out as a collection of 10 distinct cuts that hang together with formidable consistency."

== Track listing ==
All tracks written by Bernard Edwards and Nile Rodgers.

=== Side A ===
1. "Stage Fright" – 3:55
2. "Burn Hard" – 5:12
3. "So Fine" – 4:10
4. "Flash Back" – 4:28
5. "Telling Lies" – 2:28

=== Side B ===
1. "Your Love Is Cancelled" – 4:12
2. "Would You Be My Baby" – 3:34
3. "Take It Off" – 5:12
4. "Just Out of Reach" – 3:45
5. "Baby Doll" – 3:10

== Personnel ==
- Luci Martin – lead vocals (A1, A2, A5, B3)
- Alfa Anderson – lead vocals (B2, B4)
- Jocelyn Brown – vocals
- Michelle Cobbs – vocals
- Fonzi Thornton – vocals
- Nile Rodgers – guitar; lead vocals (B1)
- Raymond Jones – keyboards
- Rob Sabino – keyboards
- Bernard Edwards – bass guitar; lead vocals (A4, B3, B4)
- Tony Thompson – drums
- Manolo Badrena – percussion
- Sammy Figueroa – percussion
- Roger Squitero – percussion
- Michael Brecker – saxophone
- Ronnie Cuber – saxophone
- Lenny Pickett – saxophone
- Vinny Della Rocca – saxophone
- Randy Brecker – trumpet, flugelhorn
- Ray Maldonado – trumpet, flugelhorn

=== Production ===
- Bernard Edwards – producer for Chic Organization Ltd.
- Nile Rodgers – producer for Chic Organization Ltd.
- Bill Scheniman – sound engineer
- Jason Corsaro – sound engineer
- Dennis King – mastering
- Sandi Young – art direction
- Tony Wright – cover art
- Recorded and mixed at The Power Station, NYC.
- Mastered at Atlantic Studios, NYC.

== Chart performance ==
Chart (1982)	Peak position
US Billboard 200	124
US Top R&B/Hip-Hop Albums (Billboard)	36
