= Chic (album) =

Studio album by Chic
- Released: November 22, 1977
- Recorded: 1977
- Studio: Electric Lady, New York City; Power Station, New York City
- Genre: Disco; R&B
- Length: 38:33
- Label: Atlantic
- Producer: Nile Rodgers; Bernard Edwards; Kenny Lehman

Chic chronology
Chic (1977)	C'est Chic (1978)

Singles from Chic
- 1. "Dance, Dance, Dance (Yowsah, Yowsah, Yowsah)" Released: 30 September 1977; 2. "Everybody Dance" Released: March 1978

Professional ratings
Review scores
Source	Rating
AllMusic	3.5/5 stars
Christgau's Record Guide	B−
Pitchfork	7.6/10

Chic is the debut album by Chic, released on Atlantic Records in 1977. The cover art featured two models, Valentine Monnier (left) and Alva Chinn (right), uncredited in a photograph taken by Frank Laffitte.

== Release ==
It includes the hit singles "Dance, Dance, Dance (Yowsah, Yowsah, Yowsah)" - originally released on Buddah Records - (US Hot 100 #6, R&B #6, US Club Play #1, UK #6) and "Everybody Dance" (US Hot 100 #38, R&B #12, US Club Play #1, UK #9). Chic's debut album reached #27 on the US Pop charts, #12 on the R&B charts and was certified Gold by the RIAA, selling more than half a million copies.

Chic was released on compact disc by Atlantic Records/Warner Music in 1991. The album was digitally remastered and re-issued by Wounded Bird Records in 2006 and by Warner Music Japan in 2011.

== Track listing ==
All tracks written by Bernard Edwards and Nile Rodgers, except "Dance, Dance, Dance (Yowsah, Yowsah, Yowsah)" and "São Paulo" by Edwards, Rodgers and Kenny Lehman.

Side one
No.	Title	Length
1.	"Dance, Dance, Dance (Yowsah, Yowsah, Yowsah)"	8:21
2.	"São Paulo"	5:01
3.	"You Can Get By"	5:36

Side two
No.	Title	Length
1.	"Everybody Dance"	6:41
2.	"Est-ce que c'est Chic?"	3:53
3.	"Falling in Love with You"	4:29
4.	"Strike Up the Band"	4:32

== Personnel ==
- Norma Jean Wright - lead vocals (B1, B2, B3)
- Bernard Edwards - lead vocals (A3), bass guitar
- Nile Rodgers - guitar, vocals
- Tony Thompson - drums
- Luther Vandross - vocals
- Alfa Anderson - vocals
- David Lasley - vocals
- Robin Clark - vocals
- Diva Gray - vocals
- Kenny Lehman - woodwinds
- David Friedman - orchestral bells, vibraphones
- Raymond Jones - keyboards
- Robert Sabino - keyboards
- Andy Schwartz - keyboards
- Tom Coppola - keyboards
- Jeremy Wall - keyboards
- George Young - flute, tenor saxophone
- Vito Rendace - flute, tenor saxophone on "Dance, Dance, Dance (Yowsah, Yowsah, Yowsah)"
- Jon Faddis - trumpet
- Jay Beckenstein - saxophone on São Paulo
- Barry Rogers - trombone
- Gerardo Velez - percussion
- Sammy Figueroa - percussion
- Alfred Brown - strings contractor
- Gloria Agostini - harp
- Bernard Edwards, Nile Rodgers, Kenny Lehman - arrangements

== Production ==
- Bernard Edwards - record producer
- Nile Rodgers - producer
- Kenny Lehman - co-producer (track B1)
- Bob Clearmountain - sound engineer
- Bob Drake - engineer
- Michael Frondelli - engineer
- Ron Johnsen - engineer
- Tom Savarese - engineer
- Marc Kreiner, Tom Cossie - executive producers
- Bob Defrin - art direction
- Lynn Dresse Breslin - design
- Recorded at Electric Lady Studios, New York; vocals and mixed at Power Station, New York

== Charts ==
=== Weekly charts ===
Chart (1977–1978)	Peak position
US Billboard 200	27
US Top R&B/Hip-Hop Albums (Billboard)	12

=== Year-end charts ===
Chart (1978)	Position
US Billboard 200	37
US Top R&B/Hip-Hop Albums (Billboard)	34

== Certifications and sales ==
Region	Certification	Certified units/sales
United States (RIAA)	Gold	500,000^{^}
^{^} Shipments figures based on certification alone.
