= I Want Your Love (Chic song) =

1979 single by Chic

Single by Chic

from the album C'est Chic
- B-side: "(Funny) Bone"
- Released: January 29, 1979
- Recorded: 1978
- Studio: Power Station, New York City
- Genre: Disco
- Length: 6:55 (LP version); 3:28 (7" edit)
- Label: Atlantic
- Songwriters: Bernard Edwards; Nile Rodgers
- Producers: Nile Rodgers; Bernard Edwards

Chic singles chronology
"Le Freak" (1978)	"I Want Your Love" (1979)	"Good Times" (1979)

"I Want Your Love" is a song by American band Chic from their second studio album C'est Chic (1978). Featuring a solo lead vocal by Alfa Anderson, the song became a very successful follow-up to their hit single "Le Freak".

According to Kathy Sledge, the song was originally slated to be recorded by Sister Sledge; their background vocals were kept on the final track. Sister Sledge ended up recording "He's the Greatest Dancer", which was supposed to be recorded by Chic.

In the United States, "I Want Your Love" reached number one on the Billboard Dance Club Songs chart in November 1978 and number five on the Hot R&B/Hip-Hop Songs chart in April 1979. It also peaked at number seven on the Billboard Hot 100 in May 1979 and remained on the chart for 19 weeks. In the United Kingdom, it reached number four on the UK Singles chart (the highest position of any Chic singles) and spent 11 weeks on the chart.

== Critical reception ==
"[The song] swirls around a tricky horn-and-strings riff that builds and builds until the track practically levitates", Rolling Stone wrote. AllMusic's Jason Birchmeier called the song a "timeless floor-filler" and a "dancefloor anthem." Amy Hanson of AllMusic described it as a "sonic masterpiece" that is often better than "Le Freak," dominated by a four-note riff and a repeated "slightly melancholy refrain" of "I want your love, I need your love."

Billboard rated the song as a strong follow-up to "Le Freak" with a "catchy, rhythmic hook." Cash Box said it has "funky rhythm guitar work, a sophisticated arrangement of horns, strings, piano and tubular bells, rippling bass work and excellent female vocals." Record World said it was "more laid back [than 'Le Freak'] without compromising [Chic's] distinctive sound."

== Track listing and formats ==
- 7" vinyl single
1. A. "I Want Your Love" – 3:28 (edit)
2. B. "(Funny) Bone" – 3:41
- 12" vinyl single
1. A. "I Want Your Love" – 6:53
2. B. "(Funny) Bone" – 3:41

== Charts ==
=== Weekly charts ===
Chart (1979)	Peak position
Australia (Kent Music Report)	81
Belgium (Ultratop 50 Flanders)	21
Canada Top Singles (RPM)	10
Canada Top Disco Singles (RPM)	3
Germany (GfK)	27
Ireland (IRMA)	20
Netherlands (Dutch Top 40)	14
Netherlands (Single Top 100)	14
New Zealand (Recorded Music NZ)	15
UK Singles (Official Charts)	4
US Billboard Hot 100	7
US Adult Contemporary (Billboard)	9
US Dance Club Songs (Billboard)	1
US Hot R&B/Hip-Hop Songs (Billboard)	5

=== Year-end charts ===
Chart (1979)	Rank
Canada Top Singles (RPM)	78
UK Singles (Official Charts Company)	40
US Billboard Hot 100	62

== Certifications and sales ==
Region	Certification	Certified units/sales
United Kingdom (BPI) 2006 release	Silver	200,000^{‡}
United States (RIAA)	Gold	1,000,000^{^}
^{^} Shipments figures based on certification alone.^{‡} Sales+streaming figures based on certification alone.

== Jody Watley version ==
"I Want Your Love"
- The Remixes cover

Single by Jody Watley

from the album The Makeover
- Released: May 4, 2007
- Recorded: 2006
- Genre: Disco, house
- Length: 4:20
- Label: Avitone Records
- Songwriters: Bernard Edwards, Nile Rodgers
- Producer: DJ Spinna

Jody Watley singles chronology
"Borderline" (2006)	"I Want Your Love" (2007)

Singer Jody Watley recorded "I Want Your Love" as part of her 2006 album The Makeover. Watley's version was released as a single in 2007 and reached number 1 on the Hot Dance Music/Club Play chart for the week of June 16, 2007. It was produced by DJ Spinna and featured Nile Rodgers on guitar. Bernard Edwards, Chic's co-founder (and co-writer of "I Want Your Love"), had previously produced a huge hit for Watley in the form of her 1987 single "Don't You Want Me".

=== Track listings ===
US digital download

1. "I Want Your Love" (Soulcast Icon mix)
2. "I Want Your Love" (Masi and Mellow Late Night vocal mix)
3. "I Want Your Love" (Morgan Page Sunset Strip mix)
4. "I Want Your Love" (Angel Manuel Dirty vox mix)
5. "I Want Your Love" (Zoned Out Vintage vox mix)
6. "I Want Your Love" (Shawn Q Soltribe mix)
7. "I Want Your Love" (Cristian Paduraru vocal mix)
8. "I Want Your Love" (Danny Krivit edit)
9. "I Want Your Love" (Chin Digital House Party mix)
10. "I Want Your Love" (Soulcast radio edit)

US CD single

1. "I Want Your Love" (Soulcast Icon mix)
2. "I Want Your Love" (Morgan Page Sunset Strip mix)
3. "I Want Your Love" (Masi + Mello Late Nite vocal mix)
4. "I Want Your Love" (Danny Krivitz's original re-edit)
5. "I Want Your Love" (Soulcast Icon radio edit)

UK CD single

1. "I Want Your Love" (Soulcast UK radio edit)
2. "I Want Your Love" (Soulcast Icon mix)
3. "I Want Your Love" (Wideboy's club mix)
4. "I Want Your Love" (Wideboy's Miami mix)
5. "I Want Your Love" (Thomas Gold remix)

=== Charts ===
Chart (2007)	Peak position
US Dance Club Songs (Billboard)	1

== Other versions ==
Former Frankie Goes to Hollywood member Paul Rutherford released his version in 1989 as the second single from his debut solo album Oh World. It reached No. 82 on the UK Singles Chart.

In 2015, the song was performed in a new version by Lady Gaga for a fashion campaign by Tom Ford.

== See also ==
- List of Billboard number-one disco singles of 1978
- List of Billboard number-one dance singles of 2007
