= C'est Chic =

Studio album by Chic
- Released: November 1978
- Recorded: 1978
- Studios: Power Station, New York City
- Genres: Disco; R&B
- Length: 41:23
- Label: Atlantic
- Producers: Nile Rodgers, Bernard Edwards

Chic chronology
Chic (1977)	C'est Chic (1978)	Risqué (1979)

Cover of Très Chic

Singles from C'est Chic
- 1. "Le Freak" Released: September 21, 1978; 2. "I Want Your Love" Released: January 29, 1979; 3. "Chic Cheer (1984 Mix by Bernard Edwards)" Released: November 1984

Le Freak
Chic's "Le Freak" from C'est Chic

C'est Chic is the second studio album by American band Chic, released on Atlantic Records in 1978.

== Release ==
C'est Chic includes the band's signature hit "Le Freak", which topped the US Hot 100 chart, US R&B, and US Club Play in October 1978, selling six million copies in the US. The album also contains the hit single "I Want Your Love" (number 5 R&B, number 7 Pop, number 4 UK).

C'est Chic was the band's most commercially successful album, reaching number 4 on Billboard's album chart and topping the US R&B chart for eleven weeks. C'est Chic was Billboard's 1979 R&B Album of the Year, claiming the number one spot on Billboard's Year End Review. The album was certified platinum by the RIAA, selling over a million copies. In the UK it peaked at number 2 and has been certified Gold by the BPI.

The European version was originally called Très Chic, with the cover featuring a woman wrapped around a neon light tube. It was withdrawn and replaced with the C'est Chic version with a less risqué cover. Très Chic had a different track listing.

C'est Chic was released on compact disc by Atlantic Records/Warner in 1991 (catalogue number 7567-81552-2). The album has been digitally remastered and re-issued twice: first in 2011 by Warner Music Japan and then in 2018 at Abbey Road Studios by Atlantic.

== Critical reception ==
Professional ratings
Review scores
Source	Rating
AllMusic	4.5/5 stars
Christgau's Record Guide	B
The Encyclopedia of Popular Music	4/5 stars
Pitchfork	8.4/10
Rolling Stone	4.5/5 stars
The Rolling Stone Album Guide	4/5 stars
Spin Alternative Record Guide	9/10

The Globe and Mail deemed C'est Chic "a sleekly elegant variation" of disco. The Los Angeles Times opined that, aside from "Le Freak", the album "consists of pedestrian disco pieces and plodding R&B ballads."

== Track listing ==
All songs written by Bernard Edwards and Nile Rodgers; except where indicated.

=== C'est Chic ===
Side one

1. "Chic Cheer" – 4:42
2. "Le Freak" – 5:27 Sample
3. "Savoir Faire" – 5:01
4. "Happy Man" – 4:17

Side two

1. "I Want Your Love" – 6:55 Sample
2. "At Last I Am Free" – 7:08
3. "Sometimes You Win" – 4:26
4. "(Funny) Bone" – 3:41
  - (LP only hidden track – moog solo)

=== Très Chic ===
Side one

1. "Chic Cheer" – 4:42
2. "Le Freak" – 5:23 Sample
3. "I Want Your Love" – 6:55 Sample
4. "Happy Man" – 4:17
5. "Dance, Dance, Dance (Yowsah, Yowsah, Yowsah)" (Edwards, Kenny Lehman, Rodgers) – 3:35

Side two

1. "Savoir Faire" – 5:01
2. "At Last I Am Free" – 7:08
3. "Sometimes You Win" – 4:26
4. "(Funny) Bone" – 3:41
5. "Everybody Dance" – 3:22

== Personnel ==
Musicians

- Alfa Anderson – lead vocals (A2, B1, B2, B3)
- Diva Gray – lead vocals (A2)
- David Lasley – vocals
- Luci Martin – vocals
- Luther Vandross – vocals
- Robin Clark – backing vocals on "Dance, Dance, Dance" and "Everybody Dance"
- Nile Rodgers – guitar, vocals
- Raymond Jones – Fender Rhodes electric piano
- Robert Sabino – acoustic piano, clavinet, electric piano
- Andy Schwartz – clavinet, acoustic piano, electric piano on "Le Freak" (uncertain) and "At Last I Am Free"
- Bernard Edwards – bass guitar; lead vocals (A4, B3)
- Tony Thompson – drums
- Sammy Figueroa – percussion
- Jon Faddis – trumpet
- Ellen Seeling – trumpet
- Alex Foster – saxophone
- Jean Fineberg – saxophone
- Barry Rogers – trombone
- Jose Rossy – tubular bells
- The Chic Strings:
  - Marianne Carroll – strings
  - Cheryl Hong – strings
  - Karen Milne – strings
- Gene Orloff – concert master

Production

- Bernard Edwards – producer for The Chic Organization Ltd.
- Nile Rodgers – producer for The Chic Organization Ltd.
- Marc Kreiner, Tom Cossie – associate producers
- Bob Clearmountain – sound engineer
- Burt Szerlip – engineer
- Jeff Hendrickson – assistant engineer
- Ray Willard as "Positively No Way Ray (Willard?)" – assistant engineer
- Bob Defrin – art direction
- Joel Brodsky – photography
- All songs recorded and mixed at Power Station in New York. Mastered at Atlantic Studios, N.Y.

== Charts ==
=== Weekly charts ===
Chart (1978–1979)	Peak position
Austrian Albums (Ö3 Austria)	21
Dutch Albums (Album Top 100)	9
German Albums (Offizielle Top 100)	10
Norwegian Albums (VG-lista)	20
Swedish Albums (Sverigetopplistan)	16
US Billboard 200	4
US Top R&B/Hip-Hop Albums (Billboard)	1

Chart (2026)	Peak position
Hungarian Physical Albums (MAHASZ)	20
Hungarian Vinyl Albums (MAHASZ)	7

=== Year-end charts ===
Chart (1979)	Position
Dutch Albums (Album Top 100)	48
US Billboard 200	30
US Top R&B/Hip-Hop Albums (Billboard)	1

== Certifications and sales ==
Region	Certification	Certified units/sales
Canada (Music Canada)	Platinum	100,000^{^}
France (SNEP)	Gold	100,000^{*}
Hong Kong (IFPI Hong Kong)	Gold	10,000^{*}
United Kingdom (BPI)	Gold	100,000^{^}
United States (RIAA)	Platinum	1,000,000^{^}
^{*} Sales figures based on certification alone.^{^} Shipments figures based on certification alone.

== Cover Versions ==
Robert Wyatt had a top 20 UK Indie Chart hit with a cover of "At Last I Am Free" in 1980.

== See also ==
- List of number-one R&B albums of 1978 (U.S.)
- List of number-one R&B albums of 1979 (U.S.)
- Billboard Year-End
