= Real People (album) =

Studio album by Chic
- Released: June 30, 1980
- Recorded: 1980
- Studio: Power Station, New York City
- Genre: Disco; funk; R&B
- Length: 37:03
- Label: Atlantic
- Producer: Nile Rodgers; Bernard Edwards

Chic chronology
Les Plus Grands Succès De Chic: Chic's Greatest Hits (1979)	Real People (1980)	Take It Off (1981)

Singles from Real People
- 1. "Rebels Are We" Released: July 1980; 2. "Real People" Released: 1980; 3. "26" Released: 1980

Real People is the fourth studio album by American R&B band Chic, released on Atlantic Records in 1980. It includes the singles "Rebels Are We" (US R&B #8, Pop #61), "Real People" (#51 R&B, #79 Pop), and "26" (issued only in the UK).

The album was one of four written and produced by Bernard Edwards and Nile Rodgers in 1980, the other three being Sister Sledge's Love Somebody Today, Sheila and B. Devotion's King of the World, and Diana Ross' multi-platinum selling album Diana.

The album peaked at #30 on the US Albums chart and #8 on the US R&B chart, a modest commercial success in comparison both to the Diana Ross project and their previous albums, most likely due to the so-called "anti-disco backlash". Though in spite of the backlash, all of the album cuts peaked at #29 on the American dance charts.

Real People was released on CD by Atlantic Records/Warner Music in 1991. It was digitally remastered and reissued by Wounded Bird Records in 2003.

== Critical reception ==
Professional ratings
Review scores
Source	Rating
AllMusic	3/5 stars
Christgau's Record Guide	A
The Encyclopedia of Popular Music	4/5 stars
MusicHound R&B	3/5 stars
Record Mirror	4/5 stars
The Rolling Stone Album Guide	4/5 stars
Smash Hits	8/10
Spin Alternative Record Guide	9/10
The Village Voice	A−

In a contemporary review for The Village Voice, Robert Christgau deemed Real People a better record than Chic's Risqué (1979), even though it lacked a song as great as "Good Times". "Jumpy, scintillating rhythms fuse with elegantly abrasive textures for a funk that's not light but sharp", he wrote. "Plus post-chic words that go with the attention-grabbing heat and invention of Nile Rodgers's postrock guitar." In his year-end list for the Pazz & Jop critics poll, Christgau named it the 15th best album of 1980.

AllMusic's Alex Henderson was less impressed in a retrospective review, calling Real People a satisfactory effort but inessential, highlighted by "Rebels Are We", "I Got Protection", and "Chip Off the Old Block", none of which he said were as good as Chic's past hits.

== Track listing ==
All tracks written by Bernard Edwards and Nile Rodgers.

=== Side A ===
1. "Open Up" – 3:52
2. "Real People" – 5:20
3. "I Loved You More" – 3:06
4. "I Got Protection" – 6:22

=== Side B ===
1. "Rebels Are We" – 4:53
2. "Chip Off the Old Block" – 4:56
3. "26" – 3:57
4. "You Can't Do It Alone" – 4:39

== Personnel ==
- Luci Martin – lead vocals (A2, A3, B1)
- Alfa Anderson – lead vocals (A4, B2)
- Fonzi Thornton – lead vocals (B4)
- Michelle Cobbs – vocals
- Nile Rodgers – guitar, vocals
- Andy Schwartz – keyboards
- Raymond Jones – keyboards
- Bernard Edwards – bass guitar; lead vocals (B3)
- Tony Thompson – drums
- Sammy Figueroa – percussion
- The Chic Strings:
  - Valerie Heywood – strings
  - Cheryl Hong – strings
  - Karen Milne – strings
- Gene Orloff – concertmaster

== Production ==
- Bernard Edwards – producer for Chic Organization Ltd.
- Nile Rodgers – producer for Chic Organization Ltd.
- Bob Clearmountain – engineer
- Lucy Laurie – assistant engineer
- Jeff Hendrickson – assistant engineer
- Garry Rindfuss – assistant engineer
- Dennis King – mastering
- Bob Defrin – art direction
- Bob Kiss – photography
- All songs recorded and mixed at The Power Station, New York City.
- Mastered at Atlantic Studios, NY.
