= Everybody Dance (Chic song) =

1977 single by Chic

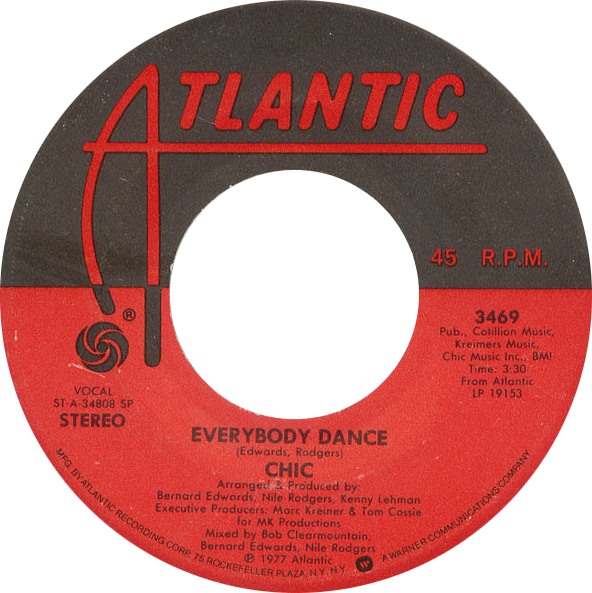
- Side A of US 7-inch single

Single by Chic

from the album Chic
- B-side: "You Can Get By"
- Released: April 1978
- Recorded: 1977
- Genre: Disco
- Length: 6:41 (album version); 3:30 (radio edit)
- Label: Atlantic
- Songwriters: Nile Rodgers; Bernard Edwards
- Producers: Rodgers; Edwards

Chic singles chronology
"Dance, Dance, Dance (Yowsah, Yowsah, Yowsah)" (1977)	"Everybody Dance" (1978)	"Le Freak" (1978)

Music video
- "Everybody Dance" on YouTube

"Everybody Dance" is a song by American band Chic. The disco song, which features Norma Jean Wright on lead vocals and Luther Vandross, Diva Gray, Robin Clark and David Lasley on background vocals, was released in April 1978 by Atlantic Records as the second single from the band's self-titled debut album, Chic (1977). According to guitarist Nile Rodgers, it was the first song specifically written for Chic, and, due to its historical status and popularity, is usually played as the opening song of the band's live set. In 1993, British group Evolution had a top-20 hit in Ireland and the UK with their cover version of "Everybody Dance". It was later heavily sampled by British group Steps on their song "Stomp" and echoed by the Manic Street Preachers on their single "(It's Not War) Just the End of Love".

The song has featured in films such as The Last Days of Disco (1998) and Summer of Sam (1999) during the orgy scene, and is also featured in the Grand Theft Auto IV expansion pack The Ballad of Gay Tony on the radio station K109. It has also been covered by Kimberley Walsh for Horrid Henry: The Movie.

According to Rodgers speaking for the BBC Four documentary "How to Make It in the Music Business", the session the song was recorded during cost the band $10, which went on bribing the elevator engineer not to tell the manager they were recording in there.

== Release ==
Unlike most Chic singles, its 12" version was not included on a regular album, nor was it widely available upon original release, with the 12" format being issued only as a promo. The extended 12" version has, however, subsequently been issued on numerous compilations. Also unlike most Chic singles, the b-side "You Can Get By" was edited down from the original album track; almost all future Chic b-sides would be presented in their full-length versions.

== Reception ==
Cash Box praised the "fine, flashy bass work, double-timing on the high-hat and handclapping." Record World said that the "good melody and arrangement" should allow the song's appeal to expand beyond Chic's previous dance audience. In 2019, American DJ and record producer Kevin Saunderson ranked "Everybody Dance" among "The 10 Best Disco Records of All Time", saying, "This was just was one of those tunes that made you wanna dance. The vocal was uplifting and hooky and gave you this energy, and the bassline was baaaaadddd. You just had to groove to it."

== Chart performance ==
"Everybody Dance" became another hit for the band in the United States, peaking at number 38 on the Billboard Hot 100 chart in 1978. In the UK Singles chart, it reached number 9 in May 1978, spending 9 weeks in the Top 40 there.

== Track listing and formats ==
- Atlantic 7" 3469, 1978

A. "Everybody Dance" (7" Edit) - 3:30
B. "Est-Ce Que C'est Chic" - 3:38

- Atlantic promo 12" DSKO 109, 1978

A. "Everybody Dance" (12" Mix) - 8:25
B. "You Can Get By" - 5:36

- Atlantic 12" DK 4621, 1978 / Atlantic Oldies promo 12" DSKO 179, 1979

A. "Everybody Dance" (12" Mix) - 8:25
B. "Dance, Dance, Dance (Yowsah, Yowsah, Yowsah)" - 8:21

== Charts ==
Chart (1978)	Peak position
Canada Top Singles (RPM)	45
Ireland (IRMA)	6
UK Singles (Official Charts)	9
US Billboard Hot 100	38
US Hot Dance Club Play (Billboard)	1
US Hot R&B (Billboard)	12

== Certifications ==
Region	Certification	Certified units/sales
United Kingdom (BPI)	Silver	200,000^{‡}
^{‡} Sales+streaming figures based on certification alone.

== Evolution version ==
"Everybody Dance"

Single by Evolution
- B-side: "Photogenic"; "Get 2 Groove"
- Released: June 1993
- Genre: Dance-pop; house
- Length: 4:01
- Label: Deconstruction; RCA
- Songwriters: Nile Rodgers; Bernard Edwards
- Producer: Evolution

Music video
- "Everybody Dance" on YouTube

In June 1993, British dance music group Evolution released their cover of "Everybody Dance" by Deconstruction and RCA Records. It was released as a single only and features lead vocals by singer Yvonne Shelton. It became a hit in clubs and also remains the group's most successful song, peaking at number 19 on the UK Singles Chart, number 12 in Ireland and number one on the Music Week UK Dance Singles chart.

=== Critical reception ===
Larry Flick from Billboard magazine wrote, "A golden page from the Chic songbook of disco evergreens is tweeked into pop/house submission by U.K. production/performing team. Fronted by singer Yvonne Shelton, track has already enjoyed heavy action on dancefloors, and is primed to twirl onto top 40 and crossover radio playlists. There are four solid remixes for programmers to dip into, as well as a pair of tasty bonus cuts, 'Photogenic' and 'Get 2 Groove'. Smells like a major breakthrough hit." Andy Beevers from Music Week gave the single four out of five and named it Pick of the Week in the category of Dance, saying, "Obvious but extremely well-crafted cover of the Chic song is currently one of the biggest club tunes around. It looks like being another hit for the Warrington-based outfit who made the Top 40 earlier this year with 'Love Thing'."

=== Track listing ===
- 7-inch vinyl, UK (1993)

A. "Everybody Dance" – 4:01
B. "Get 2 Groove" – 3:36

- 12-inch vinyl, Europe (1993)

A. "Everybody Dance" (Chic Inspirational Mix) – 6:18
B1. "Everybody Dance" (Evo Club Mix) – 7:47
B2. "Photogenic" (Supermodel Mix) – 6:35

- 12-inch vinyl, US (1993)

A1. "Everybody Dance" (Chic Inspirational Mix) – 6:18
A2. "Everybody Dance" (Evo Club Mix) – 7:47
A3. "Get 2 Groove" – 3:36
B1. "Everybody Dance" (US Mix) – 6:35
B2. "Photogenic" (Supermodel Mix) – 7:12
B3. "Everybody Dance" (US Mix Edit) – 4:01

- CD single, UK & Europe (1993)
1. "Everybody Dance" (Chic Inspirational Mix) – 6:21
2. "Everybody Dance" (Evo Club Mix) – 7:51
3. "Photogenic" (Supermodel Mix) – 7:15
4. "Get 2 Groove" – 3:36
- CD maxi-single, US (1993)
1. "Everybody Dance" (US Mix Edit) – 4:01
2. "Everybody Dance" (Chic Inspirational Mix) – 6:18
3. "Everybody Dance" (Evo Club Mix) – 7:47
4. "Everybody Dance" (US Mix) – 6:35
5. "Photogenic" (Supermodel Mix) – 7:12
6. "Get 2 Groove" (Bonus Track) – 3:36
- Cassette single, US (1993)

A. "Everybody Dance" (U.S. Mix Edit) – 4:01
B. "Get 2 Groove" – 3:36

=== Charts ===
Chart (1993)	Peak position
Belgium (Ultratop 50 Flanders)	42
Europe (Eurochart Hot 100)	56
Ireland (IRMA)	12
Israel (Israeli Singles Chart)	29
UK Singles (Official Charts)	19
UK Dance (Music Week)	1
UK Club Chart (Music Week)	7
US Maxi-Singles Sales (Billboard)	15
