= Dance, Dance, Dance (Yowsah, Yowsah, Yowsah) =

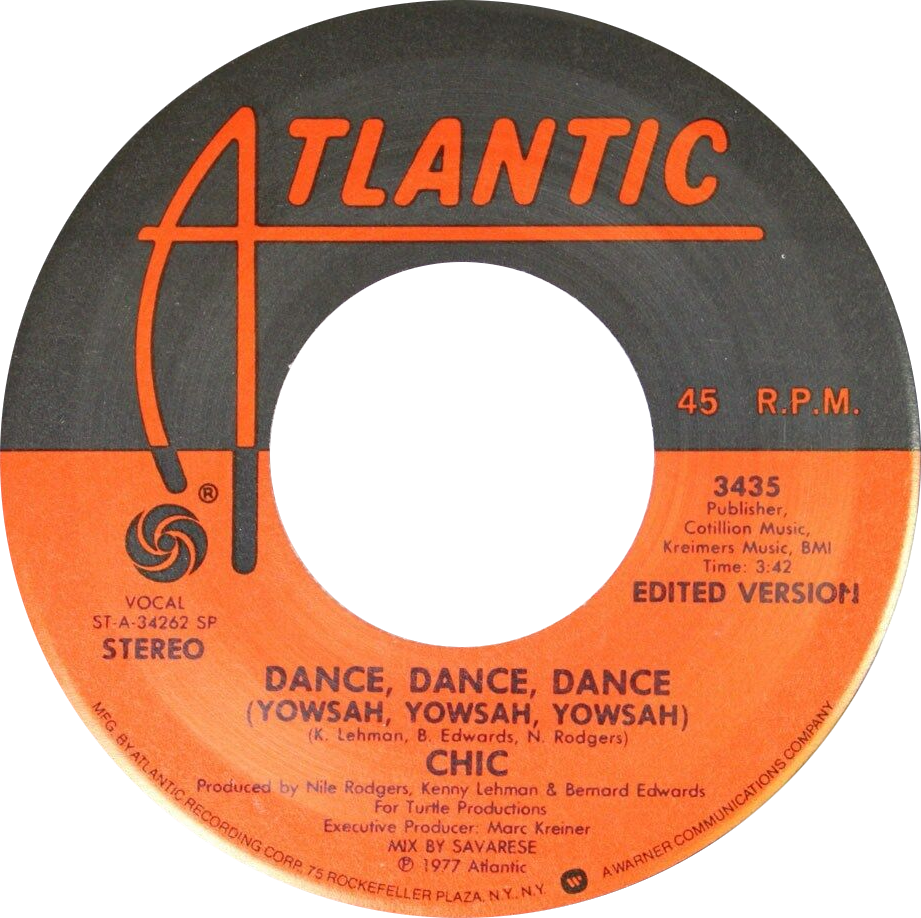
- Side A of US 7-inch single (Atlantic)

Single by Chic

from the album Chic
- B-side: "São Paulo"
- Released: September 30, 1977 (US)
- Recorded: 1977
- Studio: Power Station, New York City
- Genre: Disco; R&B
- Length: 8:21 (LP version); 3:41 (7-inch single)
- Label: Buddah (583); Atlantic (3435)
- Songwriters: Bernard Edwards; Nile Rodgers; Kenny Lehman
- Producers: Bernard Edwards; Nile Rodgers

Chic singles chronology
"Dance, Dance, Dance (Yowsah, Yowsah, Yowsah)" (1977)	"Everybody Dance" (1978)

"Dance, Dance, Dance (Yowsah, Yowsah, Yowsah)" is a song by American R&B band Chic. It was the group's first single, a hit in the United States (reaching number 6 on both the pop and R&B charts), as well as in the United Kingdom and Canada. In addition, along with the tracks "You Can Get By" and "Everybody Dance", the single reached number one on the disco chart. Luther Vandross provided backup vocals. He was working as a session vocalist at the time.

The "yowsah, yowsah, yowsah" part of the title, which appears as a spoken interjection in the middle of the song, originated with the American jazz violinist and radio personality Ben Bernie, who popularized it in the 1920s. The phrase was revived in 1969 by They Shoot Horses, Don't They?, a film about a Depression-era dance marathon.

According to co-writer Nile Rodgers,

Bernard came to my apartment one day and he had laid out the complete lyric, but we wanted to add a catch phrase, so we went through a few ideas like "23 skidoo" and "Oh, you kid" and all that stuff. We had in mind something like the old dance marathons, where the emcees made the people dance, and finally we thought of how Gig Young kept saying "Yowsah, yowsah, yowsah" in They Shoot Horses, Don't They?

== Reception ==
Record World called it "pure disco with something extra." Oakland Tribune critic Larry Kelp called it "one of the worst records of the year."

== Track listing and formats ==
Buddah 7" BDA 583, 1977 / Atlantic 7" 3435, September 30, 1977

- A. "Dance, Dance, Dance (Yowsah, Yowsah, Yowsah)" (7" Edit) - 3:41
- B. "São Paulo" - 5:01

Buddah 12" DSC 121, 1977 / Atlantic 12" DK 4600, 1977

- A. "Dance, Dance, Dance (Yowsah, Yowsah, Yowsah)" - 8:21
- B. "São Paulo" - 5:01

Atlantic 12" promo DSKO 101, 1977

- A. "Dance, Dance, Dance (Yowsah, Yowsah, Yowsah)" - 8:21
- B. "Dance, Dance, Dance (Yowsah, Yowsah, Yowsah)" (7" Edit) - 3:41

Atlantic 12" DK 4621, 1978

- A. "Dance, Dance, Dance (Yowsah, Yowsah, Yowsah)" - 8:21
- B. "Everybody Dance" (12" Mix) - 8:25

== Charts ==
Chart (1977–1978)	Peak position
Australia (Kent Music Report)	28
Canada Top Singles (RPM)	6
West Germany (GfK)	40
Ireland (IRMA)	11
Netherlands (Dutch Top 40)	37
Netherlands (Single Top 100)	22
New Zealand (Recorded Music NZ)	15
UK Singles (Official Charts)	6
US Billboard Hot 100	6
US Hot R&B/Hip-Hop Songs (Billboard)	6
US Dance Club Songs (Billboard)	1
