= Chic (band) =

American disco band

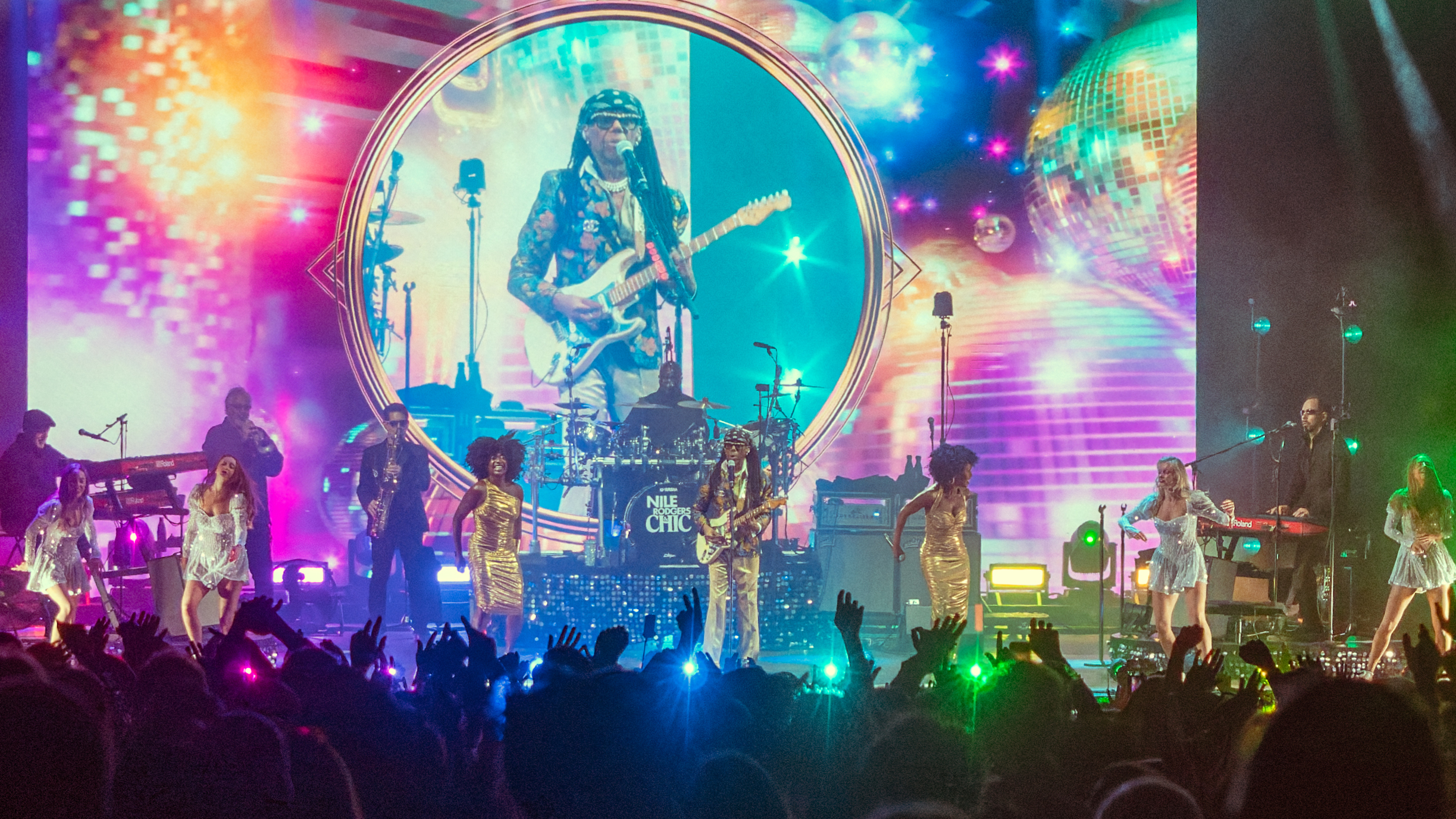
- Nile Rodgers & Chic at Crystal Palace Park in 2025

Background information
- Also known as: The Boys (1972); The Big Apple Band (1972–1977); Nile Rodgers & Chic
- Origin: New York City, New York, U.S.
- Genres: R&B; rock; funk; disco
- Years active: 1972–1983; 1990–1992; 1996–present
- Labels: Buddah; Atlantic; Warner Bros.; Sumthing Else; Virgin EMI
- Members: Nile Rodgers; Jerry Barnes; Audrey Martells; Ralph Rolle; Russell Graham; Richard Hilton; Steve Jankowski; Ken Gioffre; Naomi Rodgers
- Past members: Bernard Edwards; Norma Jean Wright; Alfa Anderson; Luci Martin; Bill Holloman; Curt Ramm; Tony Thompson; Robert Sabino; Sylver Logan Sharp; Jessie Wagner; Folami; Kimberly Davis

Chic (stylized in all caps; /ʃiːk/ SHEEK) is an American disco band founded in 1972 by guitarist Nile Rodgers and bassist Bernard Edwards. Between 1972 and 1979, Chic released several of the biggest hits of the disco era, including "Dance, Dance, Dance (Yowsah, Yowsah, Yowsah)" (1977), "Everybody Dance" (1977), "Le Freak" (1978), "I Want Your Love" (1978), and "Good Times" (1979). The group regarded themselves as a rock band for the disco movement "that made good on hippie peace, love and freedom". In 2017, Chic was nominated for induction into the Rock and Roll Hall of Fame for the eleventh time. As of 2026, Rodgers and Chic continue to perform as Nile Rodgers & Chic.

== History ==
=== 1970–1978: Origins and early singers ===
Nile Rodgers and Bernard Edwards met in 1970 as session musicians working in the New York City area. They formed a rock band initially named The Boys, but soon changed it to The Big Apple Band, and played numerous gigs around New York City. Despite interest in their demos, they never garnered a record contract. Both joined the band New York City, which had a hit record in 1973 with "I'm Doing Fine Now". The original demo tapes were made by DJ/studio engineer Robert Drake, who first played lacquer records while DJing at a New York after-hours club called Nite Owl. New York City broke up in 1976. After Walter Murphy released the single and album "A Fifth of Beethoven" under the name Walter Murphy and the Big Apple Band, Edwards and Rodgers changed their band name to Chic.

Inspired after attending a concert by English glam rock band Roxy Music, Rodgers began developing the idea for the group whose music and image would form a seamless and immersive whole, taking additional influence from the anonymous, make-up wearing American rock band Kiss. During 1977, Edwards and Rodgers recruited drummer Tony Thompson, formerly with Labelle and Ecstasy, Passion & Pain, to join the band; they performed as a trio doing cover versions at various gigs. Thompson recommended keyboardist Raymond Jones, 19, to join the band, as he had worked with him in Ecstasy, Passion & Pain. Needing a singer to become a full band, they engaged Norma Jean Wright by an agreement permitting her to have a solo career in addition to her work for the band. Using a young recording engineer, Bob Clearmountain, they created the track "Dance, Dance, Dance (Yowsah, Yowsah, Yowsah)". As a result, Chic became a support act. The title of the first song recorded as Chic was "Everybody Dance", which was on their first album.

Under contract with Atlantic Records company, during 1977, they released the self-titled debut album Chic, which was an extension of the demonstration tape. But Edwards and Rodgers were convinced that to produce the band's recording studio sound when performing live with sound and visuals, they needed to add another female singer. Wright suggested her friend Luci Martin, who became a member during late winter/early spring of 1978. Soon after the sessions ended for the debut album, the band members began to work on Wright's self-titled debut solo album Norma Jean, released during 1978. This album included the successful nightclub song "Saturday". To facilitate Wright's solo career, the band had agreed to contract her with a separate record company.

The legal details of this contract eventually forced Wright to end her relationship with the band during mid-1978, but she participated in the sessions for Chic-produced Sister Sledge album We Are Family (1979). She was replaced as a singer by Alfa Anderson, who had done back-up vocals on the band's debut album. For the Sister Sledge project, Edwards and Rodgers wrote and produced "He's the Greatest Dancer" (originally intended to be a Chic song), in exchange for "I Want Your Love" (intended originally to be performed by Sister Sledge).

=== 1978–1979: "Le Freak" and "Good Times" ===
The group endeavored to express "deep hidden meaning" in every song they wrote. During late 1978, the band released the album C'est Chic, containing one of its better-known tracks, "Le Freak". It was created in a jam session in Edwards' apartment, after they had failed on New Year's Eve 1977 to meet with Grace Jones at New York's nightclub Studio 54. The original refrain "Aaa, fuck off", intended for the doormen of Studio 54, was replaced that night with "Aaa, freak out", after trying a version with "Aaa, freak off". The resulting single was a great success, reaching No. 1 on the US charts and selling more than six million copies. It was the best-selling single ever of Atlantic's parent company, Warner Music, until Madonna's "Vogue" in 1990. On March 21, 2018 "Le Freak" was selected for preservation in the National Recording Registry by the Library of Congress as being "culturally, historically, or aesthetically significant".

The next year, the group released the Risqué album and the lead track "Good Times", one of the most influential songs of the era. The track was the basis of Grandmaster Flash's "Adventures on the Wheels of Steel" and The Sugarhill Gang's breakthrough hip hop music single "Rapper's Delight". It has been sampled since by many dance and hip hop acts, as well as being the inspiration for Queen's "Another One Bites the Dust" (1980), Blondie's "Rapture" (1981), Captain Sensible's "Wot?" (1982) and, two decades later, the bass line for Daft Punk’s "Around the World" (1997).

At the same time, Edwards and Rodgers composed, arranged, performed, and produced many influential disco and R&B records for various artists, including Sister Sledge's albums We Are Family (1979) and Love Somebody Today (1980); Sheila and B. Devotion's "Spacer"; Diana Ross's 1980 album Diana, which included the successful singles "Upside Down", "I'm Coming Out" and "My Old Piano"; Carly Simon's "Why" (from 1982 soundtrack Soup for One); and Debbie Harry's debut solo album KooKoo (1981). I Love My Lady, an album recorded with Johnny Mathis was rejected by his label and remained unreleased until 2017. As a young session vocalist, Luther Vandross sang on Chic's early albums.

=== 1980s–1990s: Disbanding, other projects, a brief reunion ===
After the anti-disco reaction at the end of the 1970s, the band struggled to obtain both airplay and sales, and during the early 1980s they disbanded. Rodgers and Edwards produced records for a variety of artists together and separately. The Chic rhythm section of Rodgers, Edwards, and Thompson provided instrumental back-up for the successful 1980 album Diana for Diana Ross that ended up selling over ten million albums internationally, with Rodgers and Edwards producing. It yielded the four weeks at number-one single "Upside Down" and the top ten song "I'm Coming Out". "My Old Piano" was a top ten single for Ross in the United Kingdom. Rodgers co-produced David Bowie's 1983 album Let's Dance and was also responsible largely for the early success of Madonna during 1984 with her Like a Virgin album, which again reunited Rodgers, Thompson, and Edwards, with keyboardist Rob Sabino and collaborators Jeff Bova, Jimmy Bralower and Oren Bar. During 1984, Rodgers was involved with a project of the band The Honeydrippers and helped produce that band's only EP.

Thompson and Edwards worked with the group Power Station on its successful 1985 album, as well as Power Station main singer Robert Palmer's solo success Riptide that same year, both of which Edwards produced. 1985 saw Rodgers producing the Thompson Twins successful Here's to Future Days album, and appearing live with them and Madonna at Live Aid in Philadelphia. During 1986, Rodgers produced the fourth album from Duran Duran, Notorious. Bernard Edwards later gave Duran Duran's bassist John Taylor the bass guitar he played on many of Chic's songs. Taylor had long been a Chic fan, his style influenced greatly by Edwards' playing.

After a 1989 birthday party where Rodgers, Edwards, Paul Shaffer, and Anton Fig played old Chic songs, Rodgers and Edwards organized a reunion of the old band. They recorded new material – a single, "Chic Mystique" (remixed by Masters at Work) and subsequent album Chic-ism (1992), both of which charted— and played live all over the world, to great audience and critical acclaim. During 1996, Rodgers was honored as the Top Producer in the World in Billboard Magazine, and was named a JT Super Producer. That year, he performed with Bernard Edwards, Sister Sledge, Steve Winwood, Simon Le Bon, and Slash in a series of commemorative concerts in Japan. His longtime musical partner Edwards died of pneumonia at age 43 during the trip on April 18, 1996. His final performance was recorded and released as Live at the Budokan (1999). Chic continued to tour with new musicians.

=== 2000–2013: Compilations, nominations, and venues ===
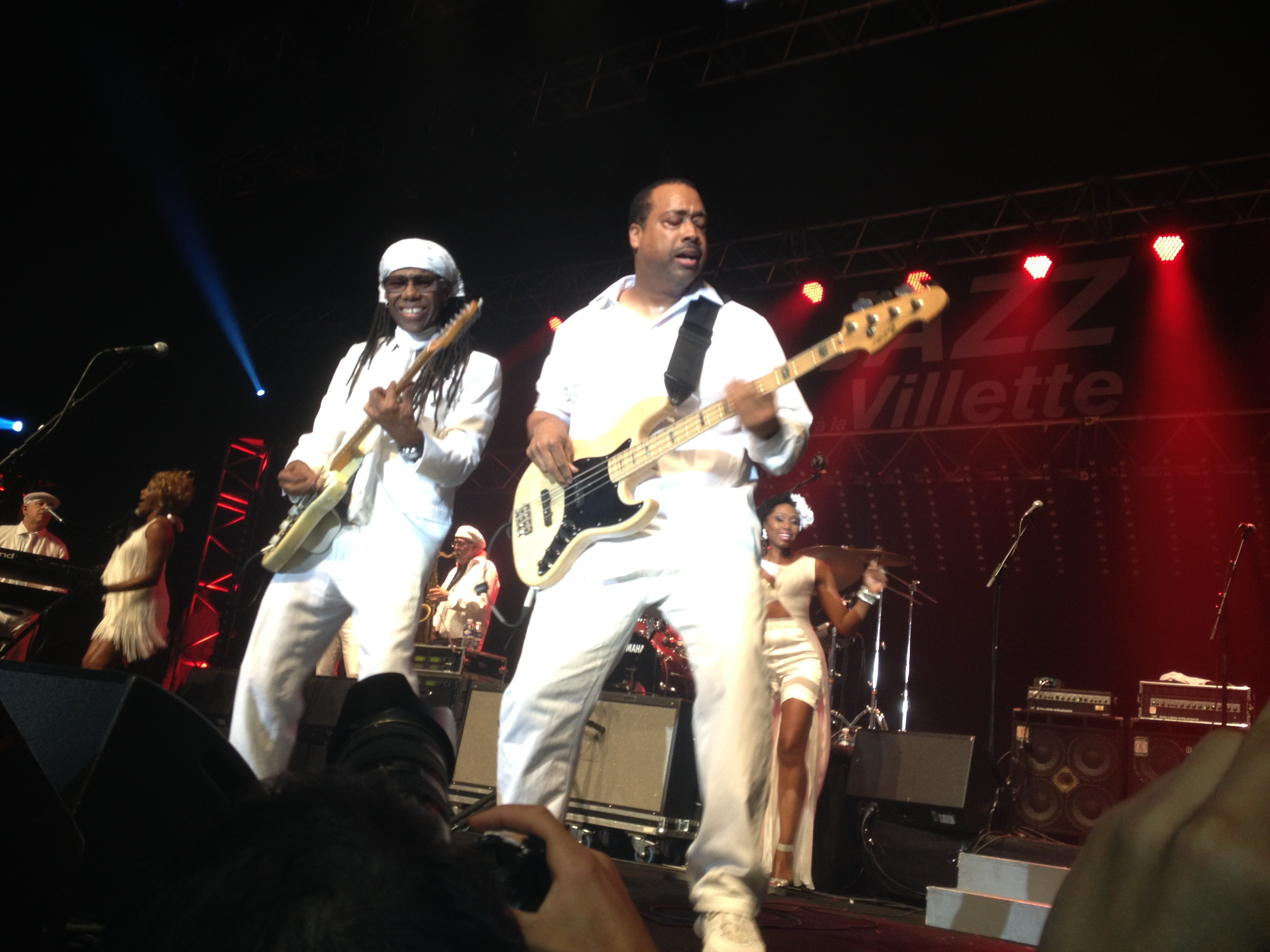
Rodgers and Barnes onstage in 2013.

Chic released four new albums during the 2000s (three compilations, and one live album): The Very Best of Chic (2000), Good Times: The Very Best of the Hits & the Remixes (2005), A Night in Amsterdam (2006), and The Definitive Groove Collection (2006). A box set, Nile Rodgers Presents The Chic Organization, Vol.1: Savoir Faire would be released in 2010, covering Rodgers and Edwards' productions both for Chic and for other artists up to the original break-up of the partnership in 1983.

Thompson died of kidney cancer on November 12, 2003, at age 48. In October 2010, Rodgers began his fight with prostate cancer. In October 2011, he released his autobiography entitled Le Freak: An Upside Down Story of Family, Disco, and Destiny. On July 29, 2013, Rodgers posted on Twitter that he was cancer free. In 2013, Chic with Nile Rodgers headlined the West Holts Stage on Friday night at the Glastonbury Festival in the UK, and played a variety of tracks both from Chic and from Nile Rodgers' extensive list of songs he had worked on for other artists. Noel Gallagher noted "My favorite act at this year's Glastonbury, when I went, was not the Rolling Stones, as great as they were; was not the Arctic Monkeys, as good as they were; was not Disclosure, as good as they were; but it was Chic. They were fucking mega. Absolutely out of this world."

A compilation album, Up All Night (2013), credited to The Chic Organization and featuring their productions for various artists between 1977 and 1982, was released the following Monday, 1 July, and entered the UK Compilation Albums Chart at number two a week later. Chic and Nile Rodgers played the iTunes Festival in London on September 14, 2013. They opened the British The X Factor live show on November 2, 2013 for Disco Week. They performed a medley of hits including "Le Freak", "He's the Greatest Dancer" and "Good Times". Rodgers announced in 2013 that he was working on a new Chic album, based on rediscovered tapes of unreleased material from the early 1980s. He also stated that Daft Punk is interested in working on at least one song of the unreleased material with him. Rodgers co-wrote and performed on three songs off Daft Punk's 2013 Grammy Award-winning Album of the Year Random Access Memories including the Grammy Record of the Year "Get Lucky" with the duo and Pharrell Williams.

=== 2014–present: It's About Time and other things ===
Chic and Nile Rodgers headlined at the 2014 Essence Festival curated by Prince. Special guests performing with Chic during a segment of the show that highlighted Chic's songwriting and production work for other artists, were Kathy Sledge for Sister Sledge's "We Are Family", Janelle Monáe for Sister Sledge's "He's the Greatest Dancer" and Prince for David Bowie's "Let's Dance". Chic and Nile Rodgers headlined Bestival on the Isle of Wight on September 7, 2014. Rodgers played tribute to his guitar technician Terry Brauer at Bestival after learning of his death from cancer. While chatting with Billboard's Kerri Mason, Rodgers announced a new Chic album and shared a never-before-heard new solo track. The upcoming album is set to feature collaborations from David Guetta and Avicii. Rodgers described how a lick he played to test a freshly-repaired guitar caught the ear of DJ Nicky Romero, ending as an important part of a "huge song" on the upcoming album. Rodgers assumed "It sounds like a pop record".

In February 2015, it was announced that Nile Rodgers had signed a new record deal with Warner Bros., with the release of a new Chic album for the first time in more than two decades. The lead single from the record, titled "I'll Be There", was released on March 20, 2015. Besides this, Warner Bros. signed a deal with Land of the Good Groove, the label formed by Rodgers and Michael Ostin, son of longtime Warner Bros. head Mo Ostin. Rodgers unveiled the track "I'll Be There" during the vernal equinox and total solar eclipse on March 20 to signify the rebirth of the Chic Organization. Rodgers received a box of lost Chic demos back in 2010, and "I'll Be There" is one of those lost tapes finished. Rodgers gave an update on his new solo material with a new track called "Do What You Wanna Do", and announced that a Chic-inspired musical is in the early stages of production. On June 25, 2017, the band performed at the Glastonbury Festival. On December 31, 2017, the band performed at New Year Live at the Methodist Central Hall in London.

On June 12, 2018, the band announced its ninth album It's About Time, which was initially scheduled for release on September 7. It was later released on September 28. The lead single, "Till the World Falls" featuring Mura Masa, Vic Mensa and Cosha, was released on June 21, 2018. The album features: Lady Gaga, Mura Masa, Vic Mensa, Cosha, Stefflon Don, Craig David, Teddy Riley, Nao, Hailee Steinfeld, Philippe Saisse, Danny L Harle, Lunchmoney Lewis, Thomas Troelsen, Emeli Sande and Elton John. In August 2018, Nile Rodgers confirmed on his Facebook account that the tenth album of Chic would follow in February 2019. He reaffirmed this scheduling on his Instagram account when he stated that the album would drop "around Valentines Day" as a gift for fans after leg one of their joint tour with Cher. The album, Executive Realness, was then pushed back to May 2019, although it did not eventuate. In September 2018, Chic and Rodgers played as the opening act for BBC One's Strictly Come Dancing. During the second and fourth legs of the American singer-actress Cher's 2019 tour, Chic served as the opening act.

== Influences and awards ==
In addition to refining a relatively minimalist disco sound, Chic helped to inspire other artists to create their own sound. For example, The Sugarhill Gang used "Good Times" as the basis for its success "Rapper's Delight" (1979), which helped initiate the hip hop recorded music format that is known today. "Good Times" was used also by Grandmaster Flash and the Furious Five on its hit "The Adventures of Grandmaster Flash on the Wheels of Steel", which was used in the end sequence of the first hip-hop movie, Wild Style, from 1982. Blondie's 1980 US number-one song "Rapture" was not only influenced by "Good Times" but was a direct tribute to Chic, and main singer Deborah Harry's 1981 debut solo album KooKoo was produced by Edwards and Rodgers.

Chic was cited as an influence by many successful bands from Great Britain during the 1980s. John Taylor, the bassist from Duran Duran claims the bass part of their top 10 single "Rio" (1982) was influenced by Edwards' work with Chic. Even Johnny Marr of The Smiths has cited the group as a formative influence. Rodgers' guitar work has been so emulated as to become commonplace, and Edwards' lyrical bass is also much-cited in music circles, as is Thompson's recorded drum work. Queen got the inspiration for its single "Another One Bites the Dust" (1980) from Bernard Edwards' familiar bass guitar riff on "Good Times" after John Deacon met the band at the Power Station recording studio.

The French duo Modjo used the guitar sample from Chic's "Soup for One", as the basic theme for their single, "Lady (Hear Me Tonight)". Chic influenced the vocal and music style of the Italian-American disco band Change, which had a series of successes during the early 1980s. The two acts also had a couple of things in common: Chic alumnus Luther Vandross was also Change's vocalist upon the latter's formation, and Change, like Chic, were signed to Atlantic through its distributed RFC label.

On September 19, 2005, the group was honored at the Dance Music Hall of Fame ceremony in New York when they were inducted in three categories: 1) Artist Inductees, 2) Record Inductees for "Good Times," and 3) Producers Inductees, Nile Rodgers and Bernard Edwards.

Chic has been nominated for inclusion in the Rock and Roll Hall of Fame 11 times: 2003, 2006, 2007, 2008, 2009, 2011, 2013, 2014, 2015, 2016 and 2017. In 2017, the Rock and Roll Hall of Fame inducted Nile Rodgers for Musical Excellence. The group was not nominated for induction in 2018. Rodgers and Chic continue to perform to major audiences worldwide as Nile Rodgers & Chic.

In 2019, Chic received a nomination for the Brit Award for International Group.

== Members ==
Original line-up

- Nile Rodgers – guitar, vocals
- Bernard Edwards – bass, vocals
- Tony Thompson – drums
- Norma Jean Wright – lead vocals
- Luci Martin – lead vocals

Current line-up

- Nile Rodgers – guitar, vocals
- Jerry Barnes – bass, vocals
- Ralph Rolle – drums, vocals
- Naomi Rodgers – lead vocals
- Audrey Martells – lead vocals
- Richard Hilton – keyboards
- Russell Graham – keyboards, vocals
- Brandon Wright – horns
- Steve Jankowski – horns
- Ken Gioffre – horns

Former members

- Alfa Anderson – vocals
- Karen Milne – strings
- Marianne Carroll – strings
- Valerie Heywood – strings
- Cheryl Hong – strings
- Karen Karlsrud – strings
- Gene Orloff – strings
- Jean Fineberg – saxophone, flute
- Ellen Seeling – trumpet, flugelhorn
- Fonzi Thornton – vocals
- Michele Cobbs – vocals
- Ullanda McCullough – vocals
- Luther Vandross – vocals
- Jocelyn Brown – vocals
- Sylver Logan Sharp – vocals
- Jill Jones – vocals
- Jessie Wagner – vocals
- Jenn Thomas – vocals
- David Lasley – vocals
- Cherie Mitchell – vocals, keyboards
- Raymond Jones – keyboards
- Robert Sabino – keyboards
- Andy Schwartz (Barrett) – keyboards
- Nathaniel S. Hardy, Jr. – keyboards
- Selan Lerner – keyboards
- Sammy Figueroa – percussion
- Gerardo Velez – percussion
- Don Harris – horns
- Omar Hakim – drums
- Mac Gollehon – trumpet
- Phillipe Saisse – keyboards
- Christopher Max – vocals
- Folami – lead vocals
- Bill Holloman – horns
- Curt Ramm – horns
- Kimberly Davis – lead vocals

== Discography ==
=== Studio albums ===
- Chic (1977)
- C'est Chic (1978)
- Risqué (1979)
- Real People (1980)
- Take It Off (1981)
- Tongue in Chic (1982)
- Believer (1983)
- Chic-ism (1992)
- It's About Time (2018)

== Hall of Fame ==
Chic has been nominated eleven times for the Rock and Roll Hall of Fame, but has yet to receive enough votes to become an inductee. They officially became the most nominated act in the Hall's history to not earn induction.

== See also ==
- List of Billboard number-one singles
- List of artists who reached number one on the Hot 100 (U.S.)
- List of number-one dance hits (United States)
- List of artists who reached number one on the U.S. Dance chart

== Bibliography ==
- Everybody Dance: Chic and the Politics of Disco, Daryl Easlea, Helter Skelter Publishing (October 24, 2004), ISBN 1-900924-56-0
