= Bernard Edwards =

American bassist (1952–1996)

Background information
- Born: October 31, 1952; Greenville, North Carolina, U.S.
- Died: April 18, 1996 (aged 43) Tokyo, Japan
- Genres: R&B; funk; soul; disco; rock
- Occupations: Bassist; songwriter; record producer
- Instruments: Bass guitar; vocals
- Years active: 1972–1996
- Label: Atlantic

Bernard Edwards (October 31, 1952 – April 18, 1996) was an American bassist known primarily for his work in disco with guitarist Nile Rodgers, with whom he co-founded Chic. In 2017, Edwards was selected as the 53rd greatest bassist of all time by Bass Player magazine.

== Biography ==
Edwards was born in Greenville, North Carolina, and grew up in Brooklyn, New York, where he met Nile Rodgers in the early 1970s. At the time, Edwards was working at a post office with the mother of Rodgers's girlfriend. The two formed the Big Apple Band (active 1972–1976) and then united with drummer Tony Thompson to eventually form Chic together with singer Norma Jean Wright.

With Chic (active 1976–1983), Edwards created era-defining hits such as "Dance, Dance, Dance", "Everybody Dance", "Le Freak", "I Want Your Love" and "Good Times". Edwards also worked with Nile Rodgers to produce and write for other artists, using Chic to perform everything musically and vocally except lead vocals. Those productions with Norma Jean Wright, Sister Sledge, Sheila and B. Devotion, Diana Ross, Johnny Mathis, Debbie Harry and Fonzi Thornton led to more hits such as "Saturday", "He's The Greatest Dancer", "We Are Family", "Spacer", "Upside Down", "I'm Coming Out" and "Backfired". In the song "We Are Family," Kathy Sledge gives Edwards a brief shout-out, singing "Yeah, come on Bernard, play...play your funky bass, boy!". As a lone songwriter/producer, he gave Diana Ross her Top 15 hit, "Telephone" from her 1985 platinum "Swept Away" album released on RCA and Ross' international label, Capitol-EMI.

Edwards released a solo album, Glad to Be Here in 1983, and in 1985 he was instrumental in the formation of the supergroup the Power Station. The band's first album was produced by Edwards and featured Chic drummer Tony Thompson, and Duran Duran members John and Andy Taylor as well as singer Robert Palmer. Edwards followed this by producing Robert Palmer's hit album Riptide. He continued to produce artists throughout the 1980s and 90s, including Diana Ross, Adam Ant, Rod Stewart, Jody Watley, Grayson Hugh, Air Supply, ABC and Duran Duran.

Edwards was the father of multi-platinum record producer Bernard "Focus..." Edwards, Jr. who has produced songs for Jennifer Lopez, Beyoncé, Busta Rhymes, Bishop Lamont, Tony Yayo and more.

Edwards teamed up with Nile Rodgers again for the Chic reunion in the early 1990s and released the album Chic-Ism in 1992.

== Death ==
In 1996, Edwards and Nile Rodgers were in Japan participating in "J.T. Super Producers '96," a concert series sponsored by Japan Tobacco. Just before the concert at the Budokan Arena in Tokyo, Edwards fell ill, but despite Rodgers' insistence, refused to cancel the gig. He managed to perform but had to be helped at times. At one point, Edwards blacked out for a few seconds before resuming his playing. Rodgers assumed the absence of bass was a deliberate improvisation and did not learn the truth until after the show. After the concert, Rodgers went to check on Edwards and asked how he was doing, to which he replied "I'm fine, I just need to rest." This was the last time Rodgers spoke to Edwards. Edwards retired to his hotel room where he was later found dead by Rodgers. The medical examiner determined the cause of death was pneumonia. Edwards's final performance was issued in 1999 as the album Live at the Budokan.

== Influence ==
His bass line from the Chic hit "Good Times" has become one of the most copied pieces of music in history, and had a huge influence on musicians of many genres when released and was the inspiration for "Another One Bites the Dust" by Queen.

"Good Times" was credited on Sugarhill Gang's "Rapper's Delight" in 1979 (the vinyl label reads "based on the music from the song 'Good Times' N. Rogers / B. Edwards") – the first rap song to become a mainstream hit. The following decades saw it sampled by artists of diverse genres, from rap to punk and techno to pop. Duran Duran bassist John Taylor often played the song in homage during his solo performances and cited Edwards as his primary influence.

Edwards was nominated for four Grammy Awards for his work with Chic, Sister Sledge, Diana Ross, and Robert Palmer.

On September 19, 2005, Edwards was honored posthumously for his outstanding achievement as a producer, when he was inducted into the Dance Music Hall of Fame at a ceremony held in New York.

== Selected discography ==
=== Chic ===
- Chic (1977)
- C'est Chic (1978)
- Risqué (1979)
- Real People (1980)
- Take It Off (1981)
- Tongue in Chic (1982)
- Believer (1983)
- Dance, Dance, Dance: The Best of Chic (1991)
- Chic-Ism (1992)
- The Best of Chic, Volume 2 (1992)
- Live at the Budokan (1999)

=== Solo ===
- Glad to Be Here (1983)

=== Production ===
- Norma Jean, Norma Jean Wright (1978)
- We Are Family, Sister Sledge (1979)
- King of the World, Sheila and B. Devotion (1980)
- Love Somebody Today, Sister Sledge (1980)
- diana, Diana Ross (1980)
- I Love My Lady, Johnny Mathis (1981, released in 2017)
- Koo Koo, Debbie Harry (1981)
- unknown title, Fonzi Thornton (1982) (unreleased)
- Swept Away, Diana Ross (1984)
- The Power Station, The Power Station (1985)
- "A View to a Kill" (single), Duran Duran (1985)
- The Heat, Nona Hendryx (1985)
- Riptide, Robert Palmer (1985)
- "Round, Round", Belouis Some (1985)
- Cocker, Joe Cocker (1986)
- Color in Your Life, Missing Persons (1986)
- Hearts in Motion, Air Supply (1986)
- Alphabet City, ABC (1987)
- If, Hollywood Beyond (1987)
- Contact, Platinum Blonde (1987)
- Jody Watley, Jody Watley (1987)
- Out of Order, Rod Stewart (1988)
- Under the One Sky, Distance (1989)
- Step into the Heat, James Freud (1989)
- YUI Orta, Ian Hunter/The Hunter Ronson Band (1990)
- Break the Silence, The Triplets (1990)
- Vagabond Heart, Rod Stewart (1991)
- Persuasion, Adam Ant (1991) (unreleased)
- Road to Freedom (Grayson Hugh album), Grayson Hugh (1992)
- Living in Fear, The Power Station (1996)

== Collaborations ==
- KooKoo – Debbie Harry (1981)
- Let's Dance – David Bowie (1983)
- Hearts and Bones – Paul Simon (1983)
- Like a Virgin – Madonna (1984)
- Riptide – Robert Palmer (1985)
- She's the Boss – Mick Jagger (1985)
- Cocker – Joe Cocker (1986)
- She – Dalbello (1987)
- Out of Order – Rod Stewart (1988)
- Move to This – Cathy Dennis (1990)
- Vagabond Heart – Rod Stewart (1991)
- A Spanner in the Works – Rod Stewart (1995)
