= This House =

This House may refer to:

== Music ==
- "This House" (Alison Moyet song), 1991
- "This House" (Tracie Spencer song), 1990
- "This House" / "Paradise", a single by Diana Ross, 1989
- "This House", a song by Japanese Breakfast from Soft Sounds from Another Planet, 2017
- "This House", a song by Gary Barlow from Since I Saw You Last, 2013
- "This House", a song by Sara Groves from Fireflies and Songs, 2009
- This House, a 1971 album by Mark Spoelstra
- This House, a 2025 opera by Ricky Ian Gordon

== Other uses ==
- This House (film), a 2022 Canadian film
- This House (play), a 2012 play by James Graham
- House of Commons of the United Kingdom, as referred to by Members of Parliament
