= Hangin =

Hangin may be

- John Gombojab Hangin (1921–1989), scholar of Mongolian studies
- An alternative spelling of Hanjin, South Korean company
- Hangin', 1982 album by Chic
- Hangin' (Bastille song), 2015 pop song by Bastille

== See also ==
- Hanging
