= The Land Before Time (soundtrack) =

The Land Before Time (Original Motion Picture Soundtrack)

Soundtrack album by various artists
- Released: November 21, 1988
- Genre: Soundtrack
- Length: 57:49 (original release); 74:00 (2020 expansion)
- Labels: MCA Records (1988); Geffen Records (2013); Intrada Records (2020)
- Producer: James Horner

Don Bluth Music of Films chronology
An American Tail (1986)	The Land Before Time (Original Motion Picture Soundtrack) (1988)	All Dogs Go to Heaven (1989)

Singles from The Land Before Time (Original Motion Picture Soundtrack)
- 1. "If We Hold on Together" Released: November 5, 1988

The Land Before Time (Original Motion Picture Soundtrack) is the film score to the 1988 film The Land Before Time directed by Don Bluth. The film score is composed by James Horner and released through MCA Records on November 21, 1988, featuring seven cues from Horner's score. An expanded edition was re-issued by Intrada Records in October 2020, which also includes the song "If We Hold On Together" performed by Diana Ross and written by Horner and Will Jennings, and was earlier released as the lead single from the soundtrack on November 5, 1988, despite not being included in the original release.

== Background ==
James Horner, who composed music for Bluth's An American Tail (1986), reunited with the director for The Land Before Time. The score was performed by the London Symphony Orchestra and the Choir of King's College. Horner said that a minor portion of the film works without music and had to be tightly timed to understand what the characters are doing, and had to include an array of emotions and cinematic things, despite being an animated film, so that it could work with a wider audience. He added, "There were some really nice scenes in that. I don't respond to animation quite like I do live action. It doesn't hit me the same way. There's a suspension of reality. Writing for something real and writing for something that's not real and pretending is a little different." Besides composing the score, Horner co-wrote the theme song "If We Hold on Together", with Will Jennings, performed by Diana Ross and produced by Peter Asher.

== Release ==
"If We Hold On Together" was released as the lead single from the soundtrack on November 5, 1988; the song peaked at number 23 on the US adult contemporary charts and was also successful in Japanese charts. Ross then included it on her 1991 album The Force Behind the Power.

The soundtrack was released through MCA Records on November 21, 1988 through audio cassette and vinyl record, and later on CDs. The album featured seven cues from the film score, composed by James Horner; the song "If We Hold On Together" was not included. The album was digitally released through Geffen Records on January 22, 2013. An expanded version of the soundtrack album was released by Intrada Records on October 27, 2020. The release featured newly remastered versions of the music on the original album, as well as 15 minutes of previously unreleased material. The song "If We Hold On Together" was also featured in the album.

== Track listing ==
=== Original release ===
No.	Title	Length
1.	"The Great Migration"	7:49
2.	"Sharptooth And The Earthquake"	10:33
3.	"Whispering Winds"	9:00
4.	"If We Hold On Together"	4:07
5.	"Foraging For Food"	7:15
6.	"The Rescue / Discovery Of The Great Valley"	12:43
7.	"End Credits"	6:22
Total length:		57:49

=== Expanded edition ===
No.	Title	Artist(s)	Length
1.	"The Great Migration"		7:50
2.	"Sharptooth And The Earthquake"		10:33
3.	"Whispering Winds"		9:00
4.	"Foraging For Food"		7:16
5.	"Journey Of The Dinosaurs"		8:30
6.	"Separate Paths"		7:14
7.	"The Rescue / Discovery Of The Great Valley"		12:44
8.	"End Credits"		6:21
9.	"If We Hold on Together"	Diana Ross	4:07
Total length:			74:00

=== Complete Score edition ===
No.	Title	James Horner	Length
1.	"The Great Migration Film Version"		3:40
2.	"Ducky, Cera and Littlefoot Are Born Film Version"		4:14
3.	"Wasteland Film Version"		2:22
4.	"Littlefoot Meets Cera Film Version"		3:32
5.	"Sharptooth And The Earthquake Film Version"		4:42
6.	"Littlefoot's Mom Dies / Littlefoot Meets Rooter Movie Version"		3:45
7.	"Battle for the Cherries Film Version"		1:03
8.	"Whispering Winds Film Version"		4:19
9.	"Littlefoot meets Ducky / Foraging For Food / meets Petrie Movie Version"		2:56
10.	"Sharptooth Is Alive / Let's Fly Movie Version"		3:17
11.	"Spike Was Hatched / Journey Of The Dinosaurs Movie Version"		4:33
12.	"Green Leaves Movie Version"		1:43
13.	"There Isn't any Sharptooth Movie Version"		2:27
14.	"Bedtime / Sharptooth Attack Movie Version"		3:18
15.	"Separate Paths"		3:21
16.	"The Rescue"		4:47
17.	"Defeat Sharptooth"		2:37
18.	"Discovery Of The Great Valley"		4:01
19.	"End Credits"		6:21
20.	"If We Hold on Together"	Diana Ross	4:07
Total length:			85:20

== Reception ==
Peter Fawthrop of AllMusic wrote "The Land Before Time would hardly have come across as eloquently and mystical had it not been for James Horner's spectacular orchestral score which in another time would have made many classical greats take notice. So full of beauty is it, so commanding of our attention, that it works without the visual footage in the same way the classic music behind Fantasia does. Horner, The London Sympony Orchestra and The King's College Choir of England bring an all-encompassing sense of wonder [...] The film, helped greatly by the music, seems almost like a face-to-face meeting between Creation and Evolution, though both sides will agree on one thing: it is amazing." Filmtracks wrote "Aside from the arguably lackluster conclusion to the score, The Land Before Time is an otherwise outstanding children's genre work that is always a joy to hear on album [...] The massive symphonic ambience of the soundtrack as a whole is perhaps its best attribute for the casual listener. Horner's long cues and countless takes of each one allowed the musicians to really emote in their performances; the London Symphony Orchestra proves its credentials in these regards as not a single major flub is to be heard. Even aside from the clear and potentially obnoxious Prokofiev emulations that will raise memories of "Peter and the Wolf" without fail, The Land Before Time is among Horner's most "classical" scores, not just in the length of his cues but in the smooth development of each idea for great lengths. The work does have a few well-placed synchronization points, blasts from brass that unsettle the listening experience, but they are not frequent."

James Southall of Movie Wave wrote "The Land Before Time is one of James Horner's very finest achievements - all of his scores for animations are good, a couple are great, but this one is something else. It stands alongside his greatest contributions to film music and is an essential ingredient in any Horner fan's collection." Jonathan Broxton of Movie Music UK wrote "The Land Before Time is easily one of James Horner's most accomplished works, and is an essential for anyone wanting to understand why his music remains so beloved." Sophie Monks Kaufman of Little White Lies wrote "James Horner's music is the sound of an absence made present. It is the sound of a bond that by all rational accounts should be severed but is saved by the depth of its impression on memory." Sean Wilson of Den of Geek listed it as one of the best scores, adding "Horner was tailor-made to score The Land Before Time, conjuring a wrenching tapesty of happiness and sadness in which the choral work in particular really gets the water-works going."
