= If We Hold On Together =

"If We Hold on Together"

Single by Diana Ross

from the album The Land Before Time Original Motion Picture Soundtrack and The Force Behind the Power
- B-side: "If We Hold on Together (Instrumental)"
- Released: November 5, 1988
- Recorded: 1988
- Genre: R&B; pop; soul
- Length: 4:07
- Label: MCA; Geffen; Motown
- Songwriters: James Horner; Will Jennings
- Producer: Peter Asher

Diana Ross singles chronology
"Mr. Lee" (1988)	"If We Hold on Together" (1988)	"Workin' Overtime" (1989)

"If We Hold on Together" is the theme song to the 1988 film The Land Before Time, and is performed by American singer Diana Ross. Played during the film's ending credits, it was released on the film's soundtrack as well on Ross' nineteenth studio album, The Force Behind the Power (1991). It was also released as the soundtrack's first and only single on November 5, 1988 by MCA Records. The song was written by James Horner and Will Jennings, and produced by Peter Asher. It reached number 23 on the US adult contemporary chart and became Ross' biggest hit song in Japan (No. 1). Having not been released as a single in Europe in tandem with the film's release, the track was belatedly released there in 1992 following a strong response to previous singles from The Force Behind the Power, peaking at No. 11 in the UK.

== Critical reception ==
Peter Fawthrop from AllMusic described the song as "a soaring, splendid ballad", noting that it "is somewhat Biblical in its message, 'Valley mountain, there is a fountain that washes our tears all away'". Katherine Cusumano from Bustle preferred it to "My Heart Will Go On", writing that "it's shamelessly sappy, but it perfectly suits the dinosaur tearjerker it appears in". James Masterton declared it as Ross' "welcome return to the slushy soul ballads only she can do properly". Pan-European magazine Music & Media stated: "Ross is the boss when it comes to romantic ballads. This one will have to share the air with all those flying angels during the Christmas period". Rotoscopers said it was the "cherry on top to this great musical score" from James Horner. The site also said it brings the same "endearing" qualities as "Somewhere Out There" from An American Tail.

== Notable covers and collaborations ==
"If We Hold on Together" was covered by Anndi McAfee and Aria Curzon, the voices of Cera and Ducky in The Land Before Time series, for The Land Before Time: Sing-Along Songs in 1997. The song was also covered by multi-Na Hoku Hanohano award-winning Hawaiian music artist Keali'i Reichel on his 1994 debut album Kawaipunahele. Jordin Sparks, a winner of American Idol season 6 also covered this song. Filipino singer Manilyn Reynes also covered this song from her 1989 album, Heartbeat. Japanese singer Yōko Nagayama also covered this song in 1990.

In 2026, Japanese rock star and composer Yoshiki was invited by Diana Ross to perform "If We Hold On Together" live in Tokyo and Osaka during her 2026 Japan tour.

== Personnel ==
- Diana Ross – lead vocals
- Lee Sklar – bass
- Russ Kunkel – drums
- Waddy Wachtel – guitar
- Guy Moon, Randy Kerber – keyboards
- Michael Fisher – percussion
- David Campbell – BGV arrangements, orchestra arrangements and conductor
- Gavyn Wright – orchestra leader
- Isobel Griffiths – orchestra contractor
- Kate Markowitz, Valerie Carter – backing vocals

== Charts ==
Chart (1988–1989)	Peak position
US Adult Contemporary (Billboard)	23

Chart (1992–1993)	Peak position
Europe (European Hot 100 Singles)	44
Ireland (IRMA)	25
Netherlands (Dutch Top 40)	35
Netherlands (Single Top 100)	36
UK Singles (Official Charts)	11
UK Airplay (Music Week)	29

== Certifications ==
Region	Certification	Certified units/sales
Japan (RIAJ) 1990 physical release	4× Platinum	456,000
