= An American Tail (soundtrack) =

An American Tail: Music from the Motion Picture Soundtrack

Soundtrack album by various artists
- Released: November 21, 1986 (original); February 12, 2019 (expansion)
- Genre: Soundtrack
- Length: 49:04 (original release); 78:28 (2019 expansion)
- Labels: MCA Records (1986); Geffen Records (2013); Intrada Records (2019)
- Producer: James Horner

Don Bluth Music of Films chronology
The Secret of NIMH (1982)	An American Tail: Music from the Motion Picture Soundtrack (1986)	The Land Before Time (1988)

Singles from An American Tail: Music from the Motion Picture Soundtrack
- 1. "Somewhere Out There" Released: 1986

An American Tail: Music from the Motion Picture Soundtrack is the soundtrack album to the 1986 film An American Tail directed by Don Bluth. It was released on November 21, 1986, through MCA Records and featured original score composed by James Horner and songs composed by Cynthia Weil and Barry Mann, in collaboration with Horner. The song "Somewhere Out There", a duet performed by Linda Ronstadt and James Ingram, won two Grammy Awards for Song of the Year and Best Song Written Specifically for a Motion Picture or for Television, and was one of the popular songs from an animated feature film since the 1950s. The album was digitally released through Geffen Records in February 2013, while an expanded edition was released by Intrada Records in February 2019, featuring 26 tracks.

== Development ==
"There is no way you could put a score like this in any other kind of film. It would only work in animation or if I wrote a ballet. I loved doing it".

— James Horner

Steven Spielberg, who worked as an executive producer, stated that the original vision for the film was as a musical; referencing the popular song "Heigh-Ho" from Disney's Snow White and the Seven Dwarfs (1937), he wanted a similar song for the film. Initially, Jerry Goldsmith who composed for The Secret of NIMH (1982), also directed by Bluth, was considered to be working on this film, but had to be opted out due to a busy schedule. James Horner was then approached for composing the score who eventually agreed. After completing Aliens (1986), Horner then worked on the score at the EMI/Abbey Road Studios in London, performed by the London Symphony Orchestra and the Choir of King's College.

Two excerpts of period music also appear in the film: The Stars and Stripes Forever by John Philip Sousa and Poor Wand'ring One from the 1880 comic opera The Pirates of Penzance by Gilbert and Sullivan. There is also a musical reference to the 1947 song Galway Bay popularized by Bing Crosby, and "Give Me Your Tired, Your Poor" is a choral interpretation of a portion of Emma Lazarus's sonnet "The New Colossus". Initially, Bluth and his team were disappointed with the first score recording, but once edited, they found the music worked quite well. The final score became one of the film's strongest points.

The initial songs were written by Tom Bahler, who had worked as a music supervisor and composer. Bahler left the project, in which Cynthia Weil and Barry Mann were later brought on to compose new songs, collaborating with Horner. They were instructed to complete four songs for the film, in a four-week timeframe. After the first round of songs were written, it was decided a special song would be written which Spielberg felt the song had Top 40 hit potential and the composers "felt no pressure to come up with a radio-friendly hit". The song, titled "Somewhere Out There", was performed by Linda Ronstadt and James Ingram and produced by Peter Asher. The film version was performed by Phillip Glasser and Betsy Cathcart in the characters of the anthropomorphic mice Fievel and Tanya Mousekewitz.

== Release ==
An official soundtrack containing 14 tracks from the film was first released on November 21, 1986, by MCA Records, and was made available on audio cassette, vinyl record, and CD. It was later released digitally by Geffen Records on February 5, 2013. An expanded edition of the score was released by February 12, 2019, consisting of previously unreleased cues and demos.

== Track listing ==
=== Original release ===
No.	Title	Artist(s)	Length
1.	"Main Title"		5:07
2.	"The Cossack Cats"		2:15
3.	"There Are No Cats in America"	Nehemiah Persoff, John Guarnieri & Warren Hays	3:00
4.	"The Storm"		3:59
5.	"Give Me Your Tired, Your Poor"		2:44
6.	"Never Say Never"	Christopher Plummer; Phillip Glasser	2:25
7.	"The Market Place"		3:02
8.	"Somewhere Out There"	Glasser; Betsy Cathcart	2:41
9.	"Somewhere Out There"	Linda Ronstadt; James Ingram	3:58
10.	"Releasing the Secret Weapon"		3:38
11.	"A Duo"	Glasser; Dom DeLuise	2:38
12.	"The Great Fire"		2:54
13.	"Reunited"		4:44
14.	"Flying Away and End Credits"		6:01
Total length:			49:06

=== Expanded edition ===
No.	Title	Artist(s)	Length
1.	"Main Title"		5:13
2.	"The Cossack Cats"		2:21
3.	"Dissolve to Sea/Lullaby"		1:03
4.	"There Are No Cats in America"	Nehemiah Persoff; John Guarnieri; Warren Hays	3:03
5.	"The Storm"		4:02
6.	"Give Me Your Tired, Your Poor"		2:50
7.	"Never Say Never"	Christopher Plummer; Glasser	2:28
8.	"Warren T. Rat/It Will Go Away"		4:11
9.	"Train Trestle"		2:00
10.	"The Market Place"		3:06
11.	"The Rumble"		1:56
12.	"Honest John and Gussie Mausheimer"		3:03
13.	"Somewhere Out There"	Glasser; Cathcart	2:46
14.	"Building the Mouse of Minsk"		2:52
15.	"Down in the Sewer/Chase in the Mauler's Den"		1:36
16.	"Gussie's Plan"		2:10
17.	"A Duo"	Dom DeLuise; Glasser	2:41
18.	"Fievel's Escape"		3:17
19.	"Releasing the Secret Weapon"		3:42
20.	"The Great Fire"		2:59
21.	"Reunited"		4:49
22.	"Flying Away and End Credits"		6:03
23.	"Somewhere Out There"	Ronstadt; James Ingram	4:04
24.	"Poor Wandering One"	Gilbert and Sullivan	0:59
25.	"The Rally" (Source)		1:12
26.	"Somewhere Out There" (Instrumental)		4:01
Total length:			78:27

== Reception ==
Evan Cater of AllMusic summarized "Horner's lush and tuneful orchestrations often emulate Spielberg's favorite composer, John Williams. His songs, co-written with Barry Mann and Cynthia Weil, pale slightly in comparison with the instrumental score. But they are charmingly performed by actors like Philip Glasser, Christopher Plummer and Dom DeLuise, and Weil's lyrics are quite clever, especially on "There Are No Cats in America" and "Never Say Never."" A reviewer from Filmtracks wrote "All put together, An American Tail stands among Horner's most effective works in the children's genre, eclipsing most of what he produced for similar topics in subsequent years [...] Few people give the composer credit for writing and nurturing six themes in this score, instead getting hung up on the classical music references or other aspects typical to Horner's writing. The composer, however, packages this effort well enough to transcend these traits and offer a score that, if only better songs had accompanied it, might have merited a five star rating."

Jonathan Broxton of Movie Music UK wrote "Despite the superficial childishness of the film it accompanies, do not be fooled into thinking that the score for An American Tail is somehow a lighter, lesser work. This score represents James Horner at his 1980s best, writing music that drips with emotion, embraces rich orchestrations, and engages in intelligent interplay between three or four memorable recurring themes. Add to this some unexpectedly dense and vibrant action music that will appeal to fans of Krull and Willow, and a handful of decent songs, and An American Tail is a winner all the way." James Southall of Movie Wave wrote "What makes Horner's scores for animations so good is that they really don't sound like scores for animations. That may seem a curious thing to say, but he genuinely takes the best aspects of animation music – memorable tunes, a great sense of fun, strong drama – but instead of the usual Mickey Mousing, he paints in broad dramatic strokes, just as he does in his other scores, and ends up with music that flows beautifully, moves dramatically from one point to another, and – most remarkably of all – still comes in reasonably lengthy tracks which feel like complete pieces of music in their own right. This is what makes it such a pity that he doesn't do animation any more; but still, at least we’ve still got the likes of An American Tail to savour."

Billboard (Joe Lynch), The Hollywood Reporter, USA Today (Patrick Ryan) and The Guardian (Andrew Pulliver) ranked the album as one of his ten best scores. Sean Wilson of Den of Geek wrote "The first step in Horner's longstanding collaboration with animator Don Bluth signalled his intuitive flair for family film scoring. With the very nature of animated soundtracks requiring long sequences of music hitting a great number of specific cue points, Horner found a perfect outlet for his warm and effusive style, able to range from light menace to heart-melting beauty in the course of just a few seconds."

== Accolades ==
The song "Somewhere Out There" has been nominated for AFI's 100 Years...100 Songs, a list of top 100 songs from the American cinema by the American Film Institute.

Award	Category	Nominee(s)	Result	Ref.
Academy Awards	Best Original Song	"Somewhere Out There"; Music by James Horner and Barry Mann; Lyrics by Cynthia Weil	Nominated	
ASCAP Film and Television Music Awards	Most Performed Songs from a Motion Picture	"Somewhere Out There"; Music by James Horner and Barry Mann; Lyrics by Cynthia Weil	Won	
BMI Film & TV Awards	Most Performed Song from a Film	"Somewhere Out There"; Music by James Horner and Barry Mann; Lyrics by Cynthia Weil	Won	
Golden Globe Awards	Best Original Song	"Somewhere Out There"; Music by James Horner and Barry Mann; Lyrics by Cynthia Weil	Nominated	
Grammy Awards	Song of the Year	"Somewhere Out There"; James Horner, Barry Mann, and Cynthia Weil	Won	
Grammy Awards	Best Pop Performance by a Duo or Group with Vocals	"Somewhere Out There"; Linda Ronstadt and James Ingram	Nominated	
Grammy Awards	Best Album of Original Instrumental Background Score Written for a Motion Picture or Television	James Horner	Nominated	
Grammy Awards	Best Song Written Specifically for a Motion Picture or for Television	"Somewhere Out There"; James Horner, Barry Mann, and Cynthia Weil	Won	
Saturn Awards	Best Music	James Horner	Nominated	

== Bibliography ==
- Cawley, John (1991). "An American Tail". The Animated Films of Don Bluth. Image Pub of New York. pp. 85–102. ISBN 0-685-50334-8.
