= Live at the Budokan (Chic album) =

Live album by Chic
- Released: February 23, 1999
- Recorded: April 17, 1996
- Venue: Budokan (Tokyo)
- Genres: Disco, funk, R&B, jazz, samba, pop, pop rock, rock
- Length: 66:53
- Label: Sumthing Else
- Producer: Nile Rodgers

Chic chronology
Chic Freak and More Treats (1996)	Live at the Budokan (1999)	A Night in Amsterdam (2006)

Alternative cover
- Re-release with alternative cover.

Professional ratings
Review scores
Source	Rating
AllMusic	3/5 stars
Robert Christgau	(2-star Honorable Mention)

Live at the Budokan is a live album by American band Chic, released on Nile Rodgers' label Sumthing Else in 1999.

The album contains the concert at Tokyo's Budokan on April 17, 1996, that was to be the last performance by fellow Chic member Bernard Edwards who died the following day. The concert was a celebration of the Chic legacy and featured an all-star line-up with guest appearances by Sister Sledge, Slash from Guns N' Roses and Steve Winwood and was released three years after its recording, in unedited form including the spoken introductions by both Edwards and Rodgers.

The concert was released on DVD in 2004 and the Budokan album has been re-issued as Chic in Japan and Live in Japan.

== Track listing ==
1. Bernard Introduction – 1:09
2. Band Introduction – 0:33
3. "Le Freak" (Bernard Edwards, Nile Rodgers) – 5:14
  - Performed by Chic & Slash
4. "Dance Dance Dance (Yowsah, Yowsah, Yowsah)" (Intro) (Edwards, Kenny Lehman, Rodgers) – 0:31
5. "Dance, Dance, Dance (Yowsah, Yowsah, Yowsah)" (Edwards, Lehman, Rodgers) – 7:04
6. "I Want Your Love" (Edwards, Rodgers) – 6:17
7. Sister Sledge (Intro) – 0:12
8. "He's the Greatest Dancer" (Edwards, Rodgers) – 4:37
  - Performed by: Chic & Sister Sledge
9. We Are Family (Intro) – 0:22
10. "We Are Family" (Edwards, Rodgers) – 10:06
  - Performed by: Chic & Sister Sledge
11. "Do That Dance" (Garrett Oliver, Tanya Ramtulla, Rodgers) – 3:24
12. Good Times (Intro) – 0:15
13. "Good Times"/"Rapper's Delight" (Edwards, Rodgers) – 7:12
14. Stone Free (Intro) – 0:21
15. "Stone Free" (Jimi Hendrix) – 4:22
  - Performed by Chic, Steve Winwood & Slash
16. "Chic Cheer" (Edwards, Rodgers) – 14:20
17. Backstage – 0:23
18. Bernard #2 – 0:31

== Personnel ==
- Sylver Logan Sharp – lead vocals
- Sister Sledge (Debbie, Joni & Kim Sledge) – lead vocals (tracks 7 to 10)
- Steve Winwood – lead vocals, organ (track 15)
- Christopher Max – backing vocals
- Jill Jones – backing vocals
- Slash – lead guitar (tracks 3 & 15)
- Nile Rodgers – guitar, vocals
- Philippe Saisse – piano
- Richard Hilton – keyboards
- Bernard Edwards – bass guitar, vocals
- Omar Hakim – drums
- Gerardo Velez – percussion
- Bill Holloman – saxophone
- Mac Gollehon – trumpet

== Production ==
- Producer – Nile Rodgers
- Recorded & mixed by Gary Tole
- Recorded live at the Budokan and mixed at Wonder Station Studios, Tokyo, Japan
- Mastered at Sterling Sound, New York
- Mastered by George Marino
