= Chic Mystique =

Single by Chic

from the album Chic-ism
- B-side: "Remix"
- Released: January 30, 1992
- Recorded: 1991
- Genre: Disco
- Length: 4:04
- Label: Warner Bros. Records
- Songwriters: Bernard Edwards; Nile Rodgers; Princesa
- Producers: Bernard Edwards; Nile Rodgers; Roger Sanchez

Chic singles chronology
"Hangin'" (1982)	"Chic Mystique" (1992)	"Get Lucky" (2013)

"Chic Mystique" is a song by American disco and R&B act Chic. Written and produced by guitarist Nile Rodgers and bass-player Bernard Edwards, it was released in January 1992 by Warner Bros. Records as the second single from their eight album, Chic-Ism (1992). The song was a number-one hit on the US Billboard Hot Dance Club Play chart, but didn't reach the Billboard Hot 100. It also achieved moderate success in many European countries where it was a top-25 hit.

== Track listings ==
- CD single / 7" single
1. "Chic Mystique" – 4:04
2. "Chic Mystique" (lovely radio edit w/out rap) – 4:42
- CD maxi
1. "Chic Mystique" (single without rap) – 4:04
2. "Chic Mystique" (lovely radio edit without rap) – 4:42
3. "Chic Mystique" (4 AM mix) – 7:03
4. "Chic Mystique" (album version) – 6:40
5. "Chic Mystique" (club mix) – 7:59
6. "Chic Mystique" (lovely club mix) – 6:46
7. "Chic Mystique" (bonus a cappella) – 1:24
- CD maxi
1. "Chic Mystique" (single version)
2. "Chic Mystique" (club mix)
3. "Chic Mystique" (brothers in rhythm 12" mix)
4. "Chic Mystique" (reprise album version)
5. "Chic Mystique" (lovely club mix)
6. "Chic Mystique" (4 AM mix)
7. "Chic Mystique" (12" remix extended album version)
8. "Chic Mystique" (taramasalta and jam dub)
9. "Chic Mystique" (club dub)
- 12" maxi
1. "Chic Mystique" (album version) – 6:40
2. "Chic Mystique" (4 AM mix) – 7:03
3. "Chic Mystique" (brothers in rhythm 12" mix) – 7:41
4. "Chic Mystique" (club mix) – 7:59
5. "Chic Mystique" (lovely club mix) – 6:46
- 12" maxi
1. "Chic Mystique" (club mix) – 7:59
2. "Chic Mystique" (club dub) – 8:06
3. "Chic Mystique" (bonus a cappella) – 1:24
4. "Chic Mystique" (12" remix extended album version) (6:50
5. "Chic Mystique" (lovely club mix) – 6:46
6. "Chic Mystique" (4 AM mix) – 7:03

== Credits ==
- Engineered by Doug DeAngelis
- Keyboards by James Preston
- Mixed by Doug DeAngelis and Roger S.
- Remixed by Roger S.
- Saxophone by Deji Coker
- Backing vocals by Robin Clark and Fonzi Thornton

== Charts ==
=== Weekly charts ===
Chart (1992)	Peak position
Australia (ARIA)	82
Austria (Ö3 Austria Top 40)	20
Belgium (Ultratop 50 Flanders)	33
Europe (European Dance Radio)	3
Finland (Suomen virallinen lista)	10
France (SNEP)	25
Germany (GfK)	25
Netherlands (Dutch Top 40)	21
Netherlands (Single Top 100)	19
Switzerland (Schweizer Hitparade)	22
UK Singles (OCC)	48
UK Airplay (Music Week)	17
UK Dance (Music Week)	14
UK Club Chart (Music Week)	10
US Hot Dance Club Play (Billboard)	1
US Hot R&B/Hip Hop Songs (Billboard)	48

=== Year-end charts ===
Chart (1992)	Position
Europe (European Dance Radio)	19
UK Club Chart (Music Week)	82

== Cover and sample versions ==
The lyrics were used in Manix's 2013 song "Rave Fantasy", which is where the title came from.
