= Workin' Overtime (song) =

Single by Diana Ross

from the album Workin' Overtime
- Released: April 24, 1989
- Genre: New jack swing; dance-pop; R&B
- Length: 4:17
- Label: Motown
- Songwriters: Nile Rodgers; Christopher Max
- Producer: Nile Rodgers

Diana Ross singles chronology
"If We Hold on Together" (1988)	"Workin' Overtime" (1989)	"This House" / "Paradise" (1989)

Music video
- "Workin' Overtime" on YouTube

"Workin' Overtime" is a song recorded by American singer Diana Ross for her seventeenth studio album of the same name (1989). The song was written by Christopher Max and Nile Rodgers and produced by Rodgers. It was released as the album's lead single on April 24, 1989, by Motown Records.

== Background and release ==
In 1988, Ross left RCA Records and returned to Motown, where she once started and which she left in the early 80s due to creative lack of freedom. Now, the singer became a co-owner of the company. Ross decided to record a new album in the mainstream sound – new jack swing. Nile Rodgers was involved in the production. He also became the producer of the song "Workin' Overtime", as well as the author together with Christopher Max.

Initially, the label planned the song "Bottom Line" as the first single from the new album, but Ross insisted that "Workin' Overtime" be released first. It was released on April 24, 1989. In the United States, the song failed to chart on the Billboard Hot 100, but it became a huge hit on the Hot Black Singles chart, reaching the third position and remaining on the chart for 13 weeks. The song showed a good result on the Hot Dance Club Play chart, rising to 11th place. A warmer reception on the pop charts for the singer was in Ireland and the United Kingdom, where the single took 28th and 32nd places, respectively.

== Music video ==
A music video was also shot to promote "Workin' Overtime". The video got into the heavy rotation of the BET TV channel; however, the video was criticized for the fact that Diana Ross "is trying to look too young."

== Critical reception ==
Jerry Smith of Music Week said this "slick and sprightly dance track that could well get Ross back into the charts."

== Track listing ==
- 7" single
1. "Workin' Overtime» – 4:18
2. "Workin' Overtime" (Instrumental) – 4:16
- 7" single
1. "Workin' Overtime» – 4:16
2. "Workin' Overtime" (Instrumental) – 6:10
- 12" single
1. "Workin' Overtime" (Extended Version) – 7:31
2. "Workin' Overtime" (7" Version) – 4:17
3. "Workin' Overtime" (House Mix) – 7:00
- CD single
1. "Workin' Overtime" (Radio Edit) – 5:16
2. "Workin' Overtime" (Extended Version) – 7:39
3. "Workin' Overtime" (7" Version) – 4:17
- 12" single [Dancin' Danny D Remix]
1. "Workin' Overtime" (The Boss Mix) – 8:50
2. "Workin' Overtime" (The Boss Instrumental) – 4:37
3. "Workin' Overtime" (The Boss Beat) – 3:59
4. "Workin' Overtime" (The Bossapella) – 2:20
- 12" single [Promo]
1. "Workin' Overtime" (Radio Edit) – 5:15
2. "Workin' Overtime" (Extended Version) – 7:40
3. "Workin' Overtime" (7" Version) – 4:17
4. "Workin' Overtime" (House Mix) – 7:00
5. "Workin' Overtime" (Club Dub) – 6:20
6. "Workin' Overtime" (Instrumental) – 6:15

== Charts ==
=== Weekly charts ===
Chart (1989)	Peak position
Australia (ARIA)	96
Europe (European Hot 100 Singles)	90
Finland (Suomen virallinen lista)	20
Ireland (IRMA)	28
UK Singles (OCC)	32
US Cash Box R&B Singles	9
US Dance Club Songs (Billboard)	11
US Hot R&B/Hip-Hop Songs (Billboard)	3

=== Year-end charts ===
Chart (1989)	Position
US Dance Club Songs (Billboard)	48
US Hot R&B/Hip-Hop Songs (Billboard)	94
