= Chic Freak and More Treats =

Studio album by Chic/Nile Rodgers
- Released: 1996/2003
- Recorded: 1996
- Studio: Le Crib Studios (Westport, Connecticut); Sony Studios (New York City); Right Track Recording (New York City)
- Genre: Disco, funk, R&B, jazz, samba
- Label: Video Arts, Japan; A 440 Music Group
- Producer: Nile Rodgers, Chazz Oliver

Chic/Nile Rodgers chronology
| Chic-Ism (1992) | Chic Freak and More Treats (1996) | Live at the Budokan (1999) |

Alternative cover
- International re-release.

Professional ratings
Review scores
| Source | Rating |
|---|---|
| AllMusic | 3/5 stars |

Chic Freak and More Treats is a studio album originally released in Japan in 1996 as a solo project by Nile Rodgers, and internationally re-issued as Chic in 2003. The album contains re-interpretations of some of Chic's greatest hits and also some of the tracks produced by Rodgers and Bernard Edwards for David Bowie, Sister Sledge and Diana Ross. Chic Freak and More Treats features guest vocals by Duran Duran's Simon Le Bon, Ashford & Simpson and Taja Sevelle and was to be Edwards' last studio project.

== Track listing ==
All tracks written by Bernard Edwards and Nile Rodgers unless otherwise noted.

1. "Everybody Dance" (feat. Sylver Logan Sharp) – 5:05
2. "Dance Dance Dance" (feat. Sylver Logan Sharp) (Edwards, Kenny Lehman, Rodgers) – 4:38
3. "Let's Dance" (feat. Christopher Max) (David Bowie) – 4:43
4. "Le Freak" (feat. Sylver Logan Sharp) – 4:35
5. "Upside Down" (feat. Ashford & Simpson) – 3:44
6. "Do That Dance" (feat. Simon Le Bon, Sylver Logan Sharp, The Crowell Sisters) (Le Bon, Garrett Oliver, Tanya Ramtulla, Rodgers) – 3:56
7. "He's the Greatest Dancer" (feat. Taja Sevelle) – 4:18
8. "Good Times" (feat. Sylver Logan Sharp) – 4:48
9. "I Want Your Love" (feat. Sylver Logan Sharp) – 5:26
10. "Music Is My House" (feat. Christopher Max & Sylver Logan Sharp) (Oliver, Rodgers) – 4:09
11. "We Are Family" (feat. Sylver Logan Sharp) – 5:54
12. "Do That Dance" (Dancehall Rap) (feat. Wayne Thompson) (Le Bon, Oliver, Ramtulla, Rodgers) – 3:51
13. "Just One World" (feat. Christopher Max & Sylver Logan Sharp) (Gordon, Oliver, Rodgers) – 4:20

== Personnel ==
- Ashford & Simpson (Nickolas Ashford & Valerie Simpson) – lead vocals (track 5)
- The Crowell Sisters – lead vocals (track 6)
- Simon Le Bon – lead vocals (track 6)
- Christopher Max – lead vocals (tracks 3, 10, 13)
- Taja Sevelle – lead vocals (track 7)
- Sylver Logan Sharp – lead vocals (tracks 1, 2, 4, 8–10, 13)
- Wayne Thompson – rapping (track 12)
- Christine Gordon – backing vocals
- Suzette Henry – backing vocals
- Jill Jones – backing vocals
- Audra Lomax Parker – backing vocals
- Tanya Ramtulla – backing vocals
- Nile Rodgers – guitar, backing vocals
- Bernard Edwards – bass guitar
- Chazz Oliver – keyboards, programming
- Richard Hilton – keyboards, programming
- Omar Hakim – drums

== Production ==
- Nile Rodgers – producer
- Chazz Oliver – producer
- Gary Tole – sound engineer
- Alec Head – additional engineer
- Carl Glanville – additional engineer
- Richard Hilton – additional engineer
- Roger Arnold – additional engineer
- Recorded at Le Crib, Sony Studios and Right Track Recording
- Mixed at Right Track Recording by Gary Tole, Pat Dillett, Larry Alexander
- Mastering by Howie Weinberg at Masterdisk NYC
