= Believer (Chic album) =

Studio album by Chic
- Released: November 14, 1983
- Recorded: April – August 1983
- Studio: Power Station, New York City
- Genre: Post-disco, new wave
- Length: 37:42
- Label: Atlantic
- Producer: Nile Rodgers; Bernard Edwards

Chic chronology
| Tongue in Chic (1982) | Believer (1983) | Chic-Ism (1992) |

Singles from Believer
- 1. "Give Me the Lovin'" Released: October 1983; 2. "You Are Beautiful" Released: January 1984; 3. "Party Everybody" Released: April 1984

Professional ratings
Review scores
| Source | Rating |
|---|---|
| AllMusic | 3/5 stars |
| Robert Christgau | B+ |

Believer is the seventh studio album by American band Chic, their last for the Atlantic Records label, and the last featuring the classic line-up of Nile Rodgers, Bernard Edwards, Alfa Anderson, Luci Martin, and Tony Thompson. The album includes the singles "Give Me the Lovin'" (No. 57 US R&B), "You Are Beautiful" (issued only in France, the Netherlands, and Scandinavia), and "Party Everybody" (issued only in Canada, Germany, and the Netherlands). The album failed to make much of an impact and shortly after its release the group disbanded.

1983 had seen Nile Rodgers releasing his first solo album, Adventures in the Land of the Good Groove - also largely overlooked, at least on a strictly commercial level. The following production assignment for David Bowie's Let's Dance (1983) album was to change the future for both Rodgers and his colleague Bernard Edwards completely.

Believer was transferred to compact disc and re-released by Atlantic Records/Warner Music in 1991. The album was digitally remastered and re-issued by Wounded Bird Records in 2006.

== Track listing ==
All tracks written by Bernard Edwards and Nile Rodgers.

Side A

1. "Believer" – 5:06
2. "You Are Beautiful" – 4:34
3. "Take a Closer Look" – 4:38
4. "Give Me the Lovin'" – 4:52

Side B

1. "Show Me Your Light" – 3:57
2. "You Got Some Love for Me" – 4:52
3. "In Love with Music" – 3:52
4. "Party Everybody" – 4:51

== Personnel ==
- Alfa Anderson – lead vocals (A1, A2, A4, B1, B3)
- Luci Martin – lead vocals (A1, A2, A3, B1)
- Curtis King – vocal
- Fonzi Thornton – vocals
- Brenda White – vocals
- Nile Rodgers – guitar; lead vocals/rap (B4)
- Rob Sabino – keyboards
- Bernard Edwards – bass guitar, vocals
- Tony Thompson – drums

=== Production ===
- Bernard Edwards – producer for Chic Organization Ltd.
- Nile Rodgers – producer for Chic Organization Ltd.
- Jason Corsaro – sound engineer
- Lynn Dreese Breslin – art direction
- Pater Sato – illustration

== US Singles ==
=== "Give Me the Lovin'" ===
Atlantic 7" 89725, 1983

- A. "Give Me the Lovin'" (7" Edit) – 3:38
- B. "You Got Some Love" – 4:52

Atlantic promo 12" DMD 693, 1983

- A. "Give Me the Lovin" – 4:52
- B. "Give Me the Lovin'" (7" Edit) – 3:38
