= Chic-ism =

Studio album by Chic
- Released: March 3, 1992
- Recorded: August–December 1991
- Studios: Power Station, New York City; Skyline, New York City
- Genres: Disco, funk, R&B
- Length: 62:47
- Label: Warner Bros.
- Producers: Bernard Edwards; Nile Rodgers

Chic chronology
Believer (1983)	Chic-ism (1992)	Chic Freak and More Treats (1996)

Singles from Chic-Ism
- 1. "Chic Mystique" Released: February 1992; 2. "Your Love" Released: April 1992

Professional ratings
Review scores
Source	Rating
AllMusic	2/5 stars
Chicago Tribune	3/4 stars
Robert Christgau	(2-star Honorable Mention)
Entertainment Weekly	B+
Rolling Stone	3.5/5 stars
Spin	(favourable)

Chic-ism is the eighth studio album by American R&B band Chic, released on the Warner Bros label in 1992.

The album includes singles "Chic Mystique" (No. 1 US Club Play, No. 48 R&B) and "Your Love" (No. 3 US Club Play). Nine years after Chic's final 1983 album Believer, during which Nile Rodgers and Bernard Edwards had worked as songwriters and producers for artists such as David Bowie, Madonna, Duran Duran, Robert Palmer, and the B-52's, and the Chic back catalogue and its musical legacy had been re-evaluated by both music critics and the general public, Edwards and Rodgers reunited for a long-awaited eighth Chic album and the following years would see the two touring the world with their new line-up of the band.

Chic-ism was digitally remastered and re-issued by Wounded Bird Records in 2006.

== Track listing ==
All songs written by Nile Rodgers and Bernard Edwards except as indicated.

1. "Chic Mystique" – 6:27 (Nile Rodgers/Bernard Edwards/Princesa)
2. "Your Love" – 5 :54
3. "Jusagroove" – 3:41
4. "Something You Can Feel" – 4:31 (Rodgers/Edwards/Princesa)
5. "One and Only One" – 4:27
6. "Doin' That Thing to Me" – 4:05
7. "Chicism" – 4:06 (Rodgers/Edwards/Princesa)
8. "In It to Win It" – 5:45
9. "My Love's for Real" – 4:52
10. "Take My Love" – 5:36
11. "High" – 4:29
12. "M.M.F.T.C.F." – 4:36
13. "Chic Mystique (Reprise)" – 4:05 (Rodgers/Edwards/Princesa)

== Personnel ==
- Sylver Logan Sharp – lead vocals (tracks 1–3, 5, 7–9, 11, 13)
- Jenn Thomas – lead vocals (tracks 1, 3, 6–8, 10, 11, 13)
- Princessa (Jennece S. Moore) – lead vocals/rap (tracks 1, 4, 7, 13)
- Tawatha Agee – vocals
- Briz – vocals
- Michelle Cobbs – vocals
- Dennis Collins – vocals
- Fonzi Thornton – vocals
- Brenda White King – vocals
- Nile Rodgers – guitar, vocals
- Richard Hilton – keyboards, programming
- Andreas Levin – programming
- Bernard Edwards – bass guitar, vocals
- Sterling Campbell – drums
- Sonny Emory – drums
- Geraldo Velez – percussion
- Stan Harrison – alto & tenor saxophone
- Steve Elson – alto, tenor & baritone saxophone
- Mac Gollehon – trumpet, flugelhorn, piccolo trumpet
- Alfred Brown – strings
- Elena Barere – strings
- Fred Zlotkin – strings
- Gerald Tarack – strings
- Julien Barber – strings
- Juliet Haffner – strings
- Marti Sweet – strings
- Matthew Raimondi – strings
- Max Ellen – strings
- Mitsue Takayama – strings
- Regis Iandiorio – strings
- Richard Locker – strings
- Richard Sortomme – strings
- Winterton Garvey – strings
- Gene Orloff – conductor (strings)

Production

- Bernard Edwards – producer
- Nile Rodgers – producer
- Bob Ludwig – mastering
- Dave O'Donell – mixing
- Jon Goldberger – mixing
- Jeff Gold, Robin Lynch – art direction and design
- Stéphane Sednaoui – photography

== Charts ==
Chart (1992)	Peak position
U.S. Billboard Top R&B Albums	39
UK Blues & Soul Top British Soul Albums	35

Singles
Year	Single	Chart	Position
"Chic Mystique"	U.S. Billboard Dance/Club Play Songs	1	
"Chic Mystique"	U.S. Billboard Dance Singles Sales	4	
"Chic Mystique"	RPM Canadian Dance/Urban Songs	7	
"Chic Mystique"	U.S. Billboard Hot R&B Singles	48	
"Your Love"	U.S. BillboardDance/Club Play Songs	3	
"Your Love"	U.S. Billboard Dance Singles Sales	6	
