= Greatest Hits Live (Diana Ross album) =

Live album by Diana Ross
- Released: 1989
- Recorded: 1989
- Genre: Soul; R&B
- Length: 67:18
- Label: EMI
- Producer: Diana Ross

Diana Ross chronology
Workin' Overtime (1989)	Greatest Hits Live (1989)	The Force Behind the Power (1991)

Professional ratings
Review scores
Source	Rating
AllMusic	2/5 stars

Greatest Hits Live is a 1989 live album released by Diana Ross in the UK on the EMI label. The album saw Ross performing material from throughout her career, from The Supremes days up to several tracks from her recent album Workin' Overtime.

The album reached #34 in the UK album charts, and was certified Gold for sales in excess of 100,000 copies.

== Track listing ==
1. "Intro - Dirty Diana" - 1:24
2. "I'm Coming Out" (Bernard Edwards, Nile Rodgers) - 1:31
3. "Upside Down" (Edwards, Rodgers) - 2:26
4. "What Can One Person Do?" (Rodgers, Smith) - 2:28
5. "Missing You" (Lionel Richie) - 4:45
6. "Mirror Mirror" (Dennis Matkosky, Michael Sembello) - 3:49
7. "Chain Reaction" (Barry Gibb, Maurice Gibb, Robin Gibb) - 3:57
8. "Muscles" (Michael Jackson) - 3:37
9. "Dirty Looks" (Scher, Golden) - 2:22
10. "Love Hangover" (Marilyn McLeod, Pam Sawyer) - 2:51
11. "The Man I Love" (George Gershwin, Ira Gershwin) - 3:45
12. "Do You Know Where You're Going To (Theme From Mahogany)" (Gerry Goffin, Michael Masser) - 2:28
13. "Ain't No Mountain High Enough" (Nickolas Ashford, Valerie Simpson) - 2:55
14. "Paradise" (Rodgers, Smith) - 3:29
15. "This House" (Rodgers) - 4:03
16. "Workin' Overtime" (Rodgers) - 3:26
17. "Supremes Medley" ("Baby Love"/"Stop! In the Name of Love"/"You Can't Hurry Love"/"You Keep Me Hangin' On"/"Love Is Like an Itching in My Heart") (Holland-Dozier-Holland) - 6:51
18. "Why Do Fools Fall in Love" (George Goldner, Frankie Lymon) - 3:11
19. "Endless Love" (Richie) - 4:16
20. "Reach Out and Touch (Somebody's Hand)" (Ashford, Simpson) - 3:44

== Charts ==
Chart (1989–90)	Peak position
Dutch Albums (Album Top 100)	72
UK Albums (OCC)	34

== Certifications ==
Region	Certification	Certified units/sales
United Kingdom (BPI)	Gold	100,000^{^}
^{^} Shipments figures based on certification alone.

== Personnel ==
- Diana Ross - vocals
- Bobby Glenn - background vocals
- Kevin Chokan - guitar
- Walt Fowler - trumpet, keyboards
- David Goldblatt - keyboards, music direction
- Rocq-E-Harrell - background vocals
- John Pena - bass
- Eric Persing - synthesizer programming
- Ron Powell - percussion
- Mark Ellis Stephens - keyboards
- Steve Tavaglione - saxophone
- Michael Warren - guitar
