= B-Movie Matinee =

Studio album by Nile Rodgers
- Released: June 1985
- Recorded: 1985
- Studio: Power Station, Atlantic Studios, New York City
- Genre: R&B, post-disco
- Length: 37:20
- Label: Warner Bros.
- Producer: Nile Rodgers, Tommy "Rock" Jymi

Nile Rodgers chronology
Adventures in the Land of the Good Groove (1983)	B-Movie Matinee (1985)	Outloud (1987)

Professional ratings
Review scores
Source	Rating
AllMusic	4/5 stars

B-Movie Matinee is the second solo studio album by American R&B guitarist and producer Nile Rodgers. As with his first album, it failed to make the Billboard 200 (its highest position bubbled under at No. 206). The single "Let's Go Out Tonight" remains Rodgers' only solo single to make the Billboard Hot 100, reaching number 88. Both "Let's Go Out Tonight" and "State Your Mind" had promotional videos made for their single releases.

== Cover artwork ==
The album features a 3D cover, designed by Mick Haggerty. Both the original vinyl release and the CD released in 2001 were sold with a small pair of 3D glasses with which to view it.

== Track listing ==
All tracks written by Nile Rodgers, except where stated.

Side A

1. "Plan-9" – 4:16 (Nile Rodgers, Jimmy Bralower)
2. "State Your Mind" – 5:47 (Martin Celay)
3. "The Face in the Window" – 4:17 (Eric Lowen, Rick Boston, Dan Navarro)
4. "Doll Squad" – 3:54

Side B

1. "Let's Go Out Tonight" – 5:19
2. "Groove Master" – 4:42
3. "Wavelength" – 3:53
4. "Stay Out of the Light" – 5:12

== Personnel ==
- Nile Rodgers: Lead and backing vocals, guitars, keyboards
- Alfa Anderson: lead and backing vocals
- Frank Simms, George Simms, David Spinner, Curtis King: backing vocals
- Tommy Jymi, Rob Sabino: keyboards
- Jimmy Bralower: Guitars, bass, drums
- Shizuko Orishige: Japanese spoken words

=== Production ===
Recorded and mixed at The Power Station and Atlantic Recording Studios, New York

- Nile Rodgers and Tommy "Rock" Jymi – producers
- James Farber – recording and mix
- Eric Mahler – second engineer
- Bobby Warner, Malcolm Pollack, Josh Abbey – additional engineers
- Steve Rinkoff, Dave Greenberg, Ira McLaughlin, Dan Nash – additional second engineers
- Joe Sidore, Gus "Nan Desuka" Skinas – digital engineering
- Budd Tunnick, Kevin Jones – production managers
- Bob Ludwig, at Masterdisk – mastering
