= Hangin' =

Single by Chic

from the album Tongue in Chic
- B-side: "City Lights"
- Released: 1982
- Recorded: 1982
- Genre: R&B
- Length: 3:39
- Label: Atlantic 89954
- Songwriters: Bernard Edwards; Nile Rodgers
- Producers: Bernard Edwards; Nile Rodgers

Chic singles chronology
"Soup For One" (1982)	"Hangin'" (1982)	"Chic Mystique" (1992)

"Hangin'" is a single from the sixth studio album by the Chic, Tongue in Chic.

It was the first single from this album and it reached #64 on the UK singles chart in March 1983, spending 1 week on the chart. It was Chic's first chart position in the UK for three and a half years. It just failed to enter US Billboard R&B chart top 40 (peaked at #48).

Billboard said that "street feel is the main suit here, starting with spoken banter and slipping into the crisply syncopated arrangement."

== Track listing ==
Atlantic 7" 89954 October 12, 1982

- A. "Hangin'" (7" Edit) - 3:35
- B. "City Lights" - 4:26

Atlantic promo 12" DMD 371, 1982

- A. "Hangin'" - 5:13
- B. "Hangin'" (7" Edit) - 3:35
