= Workin' Overtime =

Studio album by Diana Ross
- Released: June 6, 1989
- Recorded: 1988–1989
- Studios: Atlantic Studios, Skyline Studios and Soundtrack Studios (New York City, New York); Record Plant (Los Angeles, California)
- Genre: New jack swing
- Length: 39:53
- Label: Motown
- Producer: Nile Rodgers

Diana Ross chronology
Red Hot Rhythm & Blues (1987)	Workin' Overtime (1989)	Greatest Hits Live (1989)

Singles from Workin' Overtime
- 1. "Workin' Overtime" Released: April 24, 1989; 2. "This House" / "Paradise" Released: July 23, 1989; 3. "Bottom Line" Released: September 14, 1989

Workin' Overtime is the eighteenth studio album by American singer Diana Ross, released on June 6, 1989, by Motown Records. Her first Motown album with new material since To Love Again (1981) after a short stint with RCA Records, Ross reunited with frequent collaborator Nile Rodgers, chief producer of her most successful album to date Diana (1980), to make this album which was an attempt to gear her to a much younger audience bringing in new jack swing productions and house music.

Upon its release, Workin' Overtime received negative reviews from music critics and failed commercially despite the title track reaching number three on the Billboard Hot R&B/Hip-Hop Songs. The album reached the top thirty in Sweden and the United Kingdom and peaked at number 116 on the US Billboard 200, earning the distinction of becoming the lowest-charting studio album of Ross' entire solo career. Additional singles "This House" and "Bottom Line" were issued, as well as a Shep Pettibone remix of "Paradise", but all failed to revive the album's sales. The album was supported by a concert tour, the Workin' Overtime World Tour.

== Background ==
Following the release of her album Red Hot Rhythm & Blues (1987), Ross gave birth to her son Ross and became pregnant with Evan, which caused her to go on a hiatus from work. "I stayed off work for about a year... I was having my babies, and during that time I spent a lot of time watching BET on television, the kids doing the hip-hop and so on... and, you know, I’m a risk taker," Ross said.

Workin' Overtime marked Ross' first Motown album with new material since To Love Again (1981), after Ross left the label for a then record breaking $20 million deal with RCA. Upon Diana's return to the label, Motown founder Berry Gordy, Jr. had sold the label to MCA Records and had positioned Jheryl Busby to the head of Motown. Ross was at first reluctant to return to her old label, but Gordy promised her a lot for her return: Not only would Ross return to Motown as a recording act, but she would be the label's part-owner.

== Critical reception ==
Professional ratings
Review scores
Source	Rating
AllMusic	2/5 stars
Robert Christgau	C+
Los Angeles Times	2.5/4 stars

AllMusic editor Ron Wynn wrote that "this album was the first product of that new contract, and the results weren't very encouraging. There were no moderate or even small hits, and the album quickly dropped off both the R&B and pop charts within a couple of weeks of its release. Ross sounded completely lost, and the production, arrangements, and compositions sounded weak and thin next to the dominant New Jack and hip-hop works." Despite this review the album did spend 19 weeks on the Billboard R&B albums chart.

Spin said, "Missing from her new LP is everything I've ever liked about her. Also missing is everything I've ever disliked about her. It's truly strange — she doesn't sound like herself, but like a disembodied, androgynous soul voice. She's uncompromisingly or accidentally self-effacing."

== Track listing ==
All songs produced by Nile Rodgers.

No.	Title	Writer(s)	Length
1.	"Workin' Overtime"	Nile Rodgers; Christopher Max	4:17
2.	"Say We Can"	Rodgers; Cathy Block	4:20
3.	"Take the Bitter with the Sweet"	Preston Glass; Steven Ray; Steve Birch	3:51
4.	"Bottom Line"	Glass	4:05
5.	"This House"	Rodgers	5:34
6.	"Paradise"	Rodgers; Greg Smith	3:54
7.	"Keep On (Dancin')"	Rodgers; Smith	4:33
8.	"What Can One Person Do"	Rodgers; Smith	3:18
9.	"Goin' Through the Motions"	Glass; Ray; Birch	3:54
10.	"We Stand Together"	Rodgers; Smith	5:07

== Credits and personnel ==
Credits adapted from the album's liner notes.

Performers

- Diana Ross – vocals
- Richard Hilton – musician, synthesizer programming
- Andres Levin – musician, synthesizer programming
- Christopher Max – musician, synthesizer programming, backing vocals
- Nile Rodgers – musician, synthesizer programming, backing vocals
- Greg Smith – musician, synthesizer programming
- Dennis Collins – backing vocals
- Curtis King – backing vocals
- Lazet Michaels – backing vocals
- Peggy Taft – backing vocals
- Fonzi Thornton – backing vocals

Design

- Herb Ritts – photography
- Sue Reilly – art direction, design

Production

- Diana Ross – co-executive producer
- Nile Rodgers – co-executive producer, producer
- Tom Durack – engineer, mix engineer (4, 6)
- Richard Hilton – engineer
- Alan Meyerson – mix engineer (7)
- Keith Freedman – mixing (7), additional engineer
- Greg Smith – mixing (7)
- Steve Beltran – additional mixing (7)
- Patrick Dillett – additional engineer
- Paul Angelli – second engineer
- Karen Bohanon – second engineer
- Ed Brooks – second engineer
- David Michael Dill – second engineer
- Katherine Miller – second engineer
- Paul Wertheimer – second engineer
- Frank Cardello – second engineer (4, 6)
- Bob Ludwig – mastering at Masterdisk (New York City, New York)
- Jack Skinner – mastering at Europadisk (New York City, New York)
- Renee Bell – production coordinator
- Budd Tunick – production coordinator

== Charts ==
Chart (1989)	Peak position
Australia (ARIA Charts)	85
Dutch Albums (Album Top 100)	43
European Albums (Music & Media)	84
German Albums (Offizielle Top 100)	64
Swedish Albums (Sverigetopplistan)	22
UK Albums (Official Charts)	23
US Billboard 200	116

== Certifications ==
Certifications for Workin' Overtime
Region	Certification	Certified units/sales
United Kingdom (BPI)	Silver	60,000^{^}
^{^} Shipments figures based on certification alone.
