= Tongue in Chic =

Studio album by Chic
- Released: November 1, 1982
- Recorded: April – August 1982
- Studio: Power Station, New York City
- Genre: Post-disco, R&B
- Length: 32:42
- Label: Atlantic
- Producer: Nile Rodgers, Bernard Edwards

Chic chronology
Soup for One (1982)	Tongue in Chic (1982)	Believer (1983)

Alternative cover

Singles from Tongue in Chic
- 1. "Hangin'" Released: November 1982; 2. "I Feel Your Love Comin' On" Released: December 1982

Professional ratings
Review scores
Source	Rating
AllMusic	2.5/5 stars
Robert Christgau	A−
The Encyclopedia of Popular Music	3/5 stars
The Rolling Stone Album Guide	3.5/5 stars
Spin Alternative Record Guide	6/10

Tongue in Chic is the sixth studio album by American R&B band Chic, released on Atlantic Records in 1982. The album includes the singles "Hangin'" (R&B #48) and "I Feel Your Love Comin' On" (issued only in the Netherlands). Tongue in Chic peaked at No. 173 on the Billboard 200.

The album was the second of two projects to be written and produced by Bernard Edwards and Nile Rodgers in 1982, the other being the soundtrack to movie Soup for One.

Tongue in Chic was transferred to compact disc and re-released by Atlantic Records/Warner Music in 1991. The album was digitally remastered and re-issued by Wounded Bird Records in 2003.

== Critical reception ==
The Spin Alternative Record Guide wrote that the album "offers some extended nasty grooves that would soon be watered down for Bowie's Let's Dance, but the songwriting falters halfway."

== Track listing ==
All tracks written by Bernard Edwards and Nile Rodgers.

Side A

1. "Hangin'" – 5:12
2. "I Feel Your Love Comin' On" – 6:52
3. "When You Love Someone" – 5:06

Side B

1. "Chic (Everybody Say)" – 4:46
2. "Hey Fool" – 3:40
3. "Sharing Love" – 2:40
4. "City Lights" – 4:26

== Personnel ==
- Alfa Anderson – lead vocals (A3, B2)
- Jocelyn Brown – vocals
- Michelle Cobbs – vocals
- Luci Martin – vocals
- Dolette McDonald – vocals
- Fonzi Thornton – vocals
- Nile Rodgers – guitar, vocals
- Marty Celay – additional guitar on "When You Love Someone"
- Raymond Jones – keyboards
- Rob Sabino – keyboards
- Bernard Edwards – bass guitar; lead vocals (A1, A2, B3)
- Tony Thompson – drums
- Sammy Figueroa – percussion
- Robert Aaron – saxophone
- Ray Maldonado – trumpet
- Gene Orloff – strings

=== Production ===
- Bernard Edwards – producer for Chic Organization Ltd.
- Nile Rodgers – producer for Chic Organization Ltd.
- Bill Scheniman – sound engineer
- Jason Corsaro, Dave "The Rave" Greenberg – second engineer
- Scott Litt – sound mix
- Bob Ludwig – mastering
- Bob Defrin – art direction
- Herbert Schulz – photography
- Recorded and mixed at Power Station NYC.
- Mastered at Atlantic Studios NYC.
