= This House / Paradise =

"This House" / "Paradise"

Single by Diana Ross

from the album Workin' Overtime
- Released: July 23, 1989
- Label: Motown (US); EMI (World)
- Songwriter(s): Nile Rodgers
- Producer(s): Nile Rodgers

Diana Ross singles chronology
"Workin' Overtime" (1989)	"This House" / "Paradise" (1989)	"Bottom Line" (1989)

"This House" / "Paradise" is a double single from the album Workin' Overtime by American singer Diana Ross, released on July 23, 1989, in the United States by Motown. Worldwide distribution was handled by EMI, though the single was split into two releases in other regions: "This House" and "Paradise" were released separately. Both tracks were written and produced by Nile Rodgers.

It was initially planned for "This House" to be the lead single from the album; however, Ross opted to release "Workin' Overtime" instead. Despite this, "This House" did not achieve significant commercial success, peaking at number 64 on the Hot Black Singles chart. In contrast, "Paradise" gained more traction, particularly in the dance music scene, due in part to remixes by Shep Pettibone. It reached number 11 on the Dance Club Play chart in September 1989.

Both songs were included in the setlist for Ross's Workin' Overtime World Tour.

== Critical reception ==
AllMusic highlighted the track "This House" as one of the most notable on the album. The European magazine Music & Media referred to "Paradise" as the best track on the album. Muff Fitzgerald from Record Mirror remarked that "This House," a "juicy ballad," and "Paradise," with its "spicy remixes" by Shep Pettibone, were the standout tracks. Stereo Review magazine observed that tracks like "This House" contributed to the album's overall appeal. Frank Kogan of Spin also noted "Paradise" as one of the stronger dance tracks on the album.

== Charts ==
Chart performance for "This House" / "Paradise"
Chart (1989)	Peak position
US Hot R&B/Hip-Hop Songs (Billboard)	64

Chart performance for "Paradise"
Chart (1989)	Peak position
UK Singles (OCC)	61
US Dance Club Songs (Billboard)	11
