= The Secret of NIMH (soundtrack) =

The Secret of NIMH (Original Motion Picture Soundtrack)

Soundtrack album by various artists
- Released: July 2, 1982 (original release); August 17, 2015 (special edition); July 22, 2025 (expanded)
- Recorded: 1982
- Genre: Film soundtrack
- Length: 48:17 (original); 63:09 (special edition); 125:28 (expanded)
- Label: Varèse Sarabande (original); Intrada Records (special edition & expanded)
- Producer: Jerry Goldsmith

Jerry Goldsmith chronology
Poltergeist (1982)	The Secret of NIMH (1982)	The Challenge (1982)

The Secret of NIMH (Original Motion Picture Soundtrack) is the soundtrack to the 1982 animated film The Secret of NIMH directed by Don Bluth. The film score is composed by Jerry Goldsmith and performed by the National Philharmonic Orchestra. The film also featured two original songs from Paul Williams and performed by Williams and Sally Stevens. It was released through Varèse Sarabande on July 2, 1982, the same date as the film. Intrada Records reissued a special edition on August 17, 2015 and Expanded edition Remastered on July 22, 2025

== Development ==
The Secret of NIMH was Goldsmith's major composition for an animated feature, which he admitted it as a departure from his normal live-action films. He treated this project as a live action score, employing the same kind of extended themes and structural development. However, composing the unfinished scenes were challenging, and Goldsmith had to constantly keep in touch with them. He said "My dupe [copy of the film] was in black and white, and they'd bring their color copy over so I could see it. They were constantly adding footage, and it was constantly, 'What's going on here?' and 'What's happening here?'"

David M. Horton spent a year on the sound design for the film, which was supervised by Goldman. Goldman found the sound work by Horten his second favorite part of the production process, recalling that some of his "most beautiful efforts" had to make way for the recordings of Goldsmith's music: "I remember hearing David's orchestration of ambient sounds and specific sound effects for the 8-minute tractor sequence without Jerry's music cue. It was amazing. But then, so was Jerry's 8-minute music cue, it remains extremely powerful. We were able to combine a lot of David's sounds, treating them like part of the orchestra. It came out great, but I couldn't help but feel empathy for David".

== Release ==
The album was released on July 2, 1982, on vinyl and a re-released reissue on March 3, 1995, on CD with a rearranged track listing. Intrada Records issued a remastered limited-edition album on CD on August 17, 2015, with one previously unreleased cue ("At Your Service", running 3:39) and three demos of "Flying Dreams" (as performed by Sally Stevens, Paul Williams and as a piano duet) totaling 10:09. Varese Sarabande did release the soundtrack on CD prior to the 1995 re-released reissue in 1986 with the artwork as the same as the LP jacket, but with a black background and a different track arrangement.

== Track listing ==
=== Original release ===
No.	Title	Artist(s)	Length
1.	"Main Title"		3:15
2.	"Allergic Reaction / Athletic Type"		2:42
3.	"Flying Dreams" (Lullaby)	Sally Stevens	3:18
4.	"The Tractor"		3:00
5.	"The Sentry Reel / The Story Of NIMH"		6:05
6.	"Escape From NIMH / In Disguise"		5:02
7.	"Flying Dreams"	Paul Williams	3:21
8.	"Step Inside My House"		4:43
9.	"No Thanks"		2:03
10.	"Moving Day"		8:00
11.	"The House Raising"		4:36
12.	"Flying High / End Title"		2:39
Total length:			48:25

=== Special edition ===
No.	Title	Artist(s)	Length
1.	"Main Title"		3:15
2.	"Allergic Reaction / Athletic Type"		2:42
3.	"Flying Dreams" (Lullaby)	Sally Stevens	3:18
4.	"The Tractor"		3:00
5.	"The Sentry Reel / The Story Of NIMH"		6:05
6.	"At Your Service"		3:39
7.	"Escape From NIMH / In Disguise"		5:02
8.	"Flying Dreams"	Paul Williams	3:21
9.	"Step Inside My House"		4:43
10.	"No Thanks"		2:03
11.	"Moving Day"		8:00
12.	"The House Raising"		4:36
13.	"Flying High / End Title"		2:39
14.	"Flying Dreams" (End Title Demo)	Sally Stevens	3:15
15.	"Flying Dreams" (Demo) (Vocal)	Paul Williams	3:21
16.	"Flying Dreams" (Demo) (Piano Duet)		3:24
Total length:			62:23

=== Expanded edition ===
Total CD 1 Time 75:46

No.	Title	Length
1.	"Main Title (Film Version)"	3:21
2.	"Potion*"	1:42
3.	"Allergic Reaction (Film Version)"	2:14
4.	"Athletic Type (Film Version)"	0:40
5.	"Flying Dreams (Vocal By Sally Stevens) (Film Version)"	3:21
6.	"The Tractor"	3:02
7.	"No Thanks"	2:06
8.	"Step Inside My House"	4:46
9.	"In Disguise (Film Version)"	(2:47)
10.	"The Sentry Reel (Film Version)**"	(2:33)
11.	"At Your Service"	(3:42)
12.	"Tied Up*"	(1:34)
13.	"Be Brief*"	(0:42)
14.	"The Story Of NIMH (Film Version)"	(4:06)
15.	"Escape From NIMH (Film Version)"	(2:24)
16.	"New Resolve*"	(2:10)
17.	"In Disguise*"	(1:32)
18.	"A Better Mousetrap*"	(1:09)
19.	"Moving Day"	(8:01)
20.	"House Raising"	(4:38)
21.	"Flying High/Flying Dreams (Film Version)/End Title (Film Version)**"	(5:45)
22.	"Flying Dreams – Demo (Piano Duet)"	(3:25)
23.	"Flying Dreams – End Title Demo (Vocal By Sally Stevens)"	(3:17)
24.	"Flying Dreams – Demo (Vocal By Paul Williams)"	(3:21)
25.	"Flying Dreams – End Title Foreign Language Version (Vocal By Sally Stevens)*"	(3:29)
Total length:		75:46

- Previously Unreleased
  - Includes Previously Unreleased Material

== Critical reception ==
Jason Ankeny of AllMusic wrote "Listeners raised on a steady diet of post-Little Mermaid Disney soundtracks may have no idea what to make of The Secret of NIMH, but Goldsmith enthusiasts will discover much to savor here. Its sweeping melodies and vivid choral passages are well-matched to the fantasy genre, buoyed by Goldsmith's artful pacing and unerring flair for the dramatic." Filmtracks wrote "Ultimately, Goldsmith fans may be disappointed by the lack of a true dynamic soundscape in many parts of this score, but you cannot discount the number of people who fondly recall the effect that The Secret of N.I.M.H. had on them or their children. It's a solid entry all around that only its relatively archival sound quality restrains. Outside of the lovely primary theme and some of the deep brass action pieces, however, it's not quite as impressive as James Horner's scores for Bluth's subsequent ventures."

Sean Wilson of MFiles wrote "The Secret of NIMH truly is a remarkable piece of work, one of Goldsmith's finest scores and one of the finest ever composed for an animation. That Goldsmith was able to sustain such dramatic tension in a genre renowned for musical "mickey-mousing" was an incredible achievement, and helped pave the way for animated scores to follow." He also ranked it as one of the best film scores of Goldsmith, in his Den of Geek adding "Defying the approach taken by his contemporaries, Goldsmith never mickey-mouses the action or attempts to make it overly cutesy, instead creating a gripping dramatic undercurrent that plays to the story’s themes of family, magic and betrayal."

== Bibliography ==
- Cawley, John (1991). "The Secret of NIMH". The Animated Films of Don Bluth. Image Pub of New York. pp. 37–56. ISBN 0-685-50334-8.
