= Somewhere Out There (An American Tail song) =

1986 single by Linda Ronstadt and James Ingram

Single by Linda Ronstadt and James Ingram

from the album An American Tail: Music from the Motion Picture Soundtrack
- B-side: "Somewhere Out There" (instrumental)
- Released: 1986
- Length: 3:54
- Label: MCA
- Songwriters: James Horner; Barry Mann; Cynthia Weil
- Producers: Peter Asher; Steve Tyrell

Linda Ronstadt singles chronology
| "I Love You for Sentimental Reasons" (1986) | "Somewhere Out There" (1986) | "To Know Him Is to Love Him" (1987) |

James Ingram singles chronology
| "Never Felt So Good" (1986) | "Somewhere Out There" (1986) | "Better Way" (1987) |

Audio
- "Somewhere Out There (From "An American Tail" Soundtrack)" on YouTube

"Somewhere Out There" is a song released by MCA Records and recorded by American singers Linda Ronstadt and James Ingram for the soundtrack of the animated feature film An American Tail (1986). The song was written by James Horner, Barry Mann, and Cynthia Weil, and produced by Peter Asher and Steve Tyrell. It reached number eight in the United Kingdom, number six in Ireland, and number two in both the United States and Canada.

== Background ==
Steven Spielberg, the film's producer, invited songwriters Barry Mann and Cynthia Weil to collaborate with James Horner on four songs for its soundtrack, to be completed in a four-week timeframe. The composers "felt no pressure to come up with a radio-friendly hit" and were surprised when Spielberg felt the song had Top 40 hit potential and recruited world-renowned recording artists, Linda Ronstadt and James Ingram, to record a pop version of it for the film's closing credits. In the main body of the film, the song was performed by Phillip Glasser and Betsy Cathcart in the characters of the anthropomorphic mice Fievel and Tanya Mousekewitz.

Produced by Ronstadt's regular producer Peter Asher, the single release of the Ronstadt/Ingram track made its debut at number 31 on the Adult Contemporary chart in Billboard dated November 15, 1986, crossing over to the Billboard Hot 100 dated December 20, 1986, with a number 83 debut. In January 1987, the song returned Ronstadt to the top 40 after a four-year absence, eventually peaking at number two on the week of March 14.

== Music video ==
The music video for the song was written, directed, and produced by Jeffrey Abelson. It was filmed on a stage in Hollywood, designed to look like a pair of animator lofts in New York City. The video features Ronstadt and Ingram, each at an animation desk in their own studio in opposite buildings, with a moon-lite bridge connecting them. As they paint scenes from the film, the video cuts to corresponding clips from the movie. At one point they rise, and gaze out their windows, just like Fievel and Tanya do in the movie. Then Linda and James join each other on the bridge, and sing their hearts out, as the movie mice characters sing and reunite as well.

== Theme ==
The lyrics convey the love felt by two people separated by vast distances, but comforted by the belief that their love will eventually reunite them. In the context of the film, the fictional brother-and-sister characters Fievel and Tanya Mousekewitz sing the song, while the love they share is described as familial. However, in the end title pop version of it, the love is described as more romantic.

== Awards ==
At the 30th Grammy Awards, the song won two awards, one for Song of the Year and the other for Best Song Written Specifically for a Motion Picture or Television. It also garnered Ronstadt and Ingram a Grammy nomination for Best Pop Performance by a Duo or Group with Vocal.

It earned nominations for Best Original Song at the 44th Golden Globe Awards and the 59th Academy Awards, but lost both to "Take My Breath Away" from Top Gun. At the Academy Awards ceremony, Natalie Cole performed the song live with Ingram standing in for Ronstadt.

== Charts ==
=== Weekly charts ===
Weekly chart performance for "Somewhere Out There"
| Chart (1986–1987) | Peak position |
|---|---|
| Australia (Australian Music Report) | 31 |
| Canada Top Singles (RPM) | 2 |
| Canada Adult Contemporary (RPM) | 2 |
| Europe (Eurochart Hot 100) | 42 |
| Ireland (IRMA) | 6 |
| Netherlands (Dutch Top 40 Tipparade) | 8 |
| Netherlands (Single Top 100) | 51 |
| Sweden (Sverigetopplistan) | 15 |
| UK Singles (Official Charts) | 8 |
| US Billboard Hot 100 | 2 |
| US Adult Contemporary (Billboard) | 4 |

=== Year-end charts ===
Year-end chart performance for "Somewhere Out There"
| Chart (1987) | Position |
|---|---|
| Canada Top Singles (RPM) | 20 |
| UK Singles (OCC) | 83 |
| US Billboard Hot 100 | 39 |

== Certifications ==
Certifications and sales for "Somewhere Out There"
| Region | Certification | Certified units/sales |
|---|---|---|
| United States (RIAA) | Gold | 500,000^{^} |
^{^} Shipments figures based on certification alone.

== Covers ==
In early 1987, singer Liza Minnelli performed, in the words of music critic Stephen Holden of The New York Times, "a stunning rendition" of the song at Carnegie Hall for her three-week concert engagement at the historic music venue. The concert was recorded by Telarc Records and released in late 1987. In 2013, during Julio Iglesias' concert in Jakarta, Ingram performed the song live with Sherina Munaf.
