= The Force Behind the Power =

Studio album by Diana Ross
- Released: September 10, 1991
- Studio: Bill Schnee Studios (North Hollywood, California); Conway Studios (Hollywood, California); Studio F, Wonderland Studios, Westlake Audio, Off Meleose Recording Studio and The Complex (Los Angeles, California); Cal Harris Studios (Woodland Hills, California); The Sandbox Studios (Easton, Connecticut); The Hit Factory (New York City, New York); Bubble Hill Studios (Englewood, New Jersey); E.F. Cutting Studios (New Jersey); Abbey Road Studios (London, England)
- Genre: New jack swing; R&B
- Length: 47:33; 56:51
- Label: Motown
- Producer: Stevie Wonder; Al B. Sure!; James Anthony Carmichael; Peter Asher; Kyle West

Diana Ross chronology
Greatest Hits Live (1989)	The Force Behind the Power (1991)	Stolen Moments: The Lady Sings... Jazz and Blues (1993)

Singles from The Force Behind the Power
- 1. "If We Hold on Together" Released: November 5, 1988; 2. "No Matter What You Do (Duet w/ Al B. Sure)" Released: February 20, 1991; 3. "When You Tell Me That You Love Me" Released: August 20, 1991; 4. "You're Gonna Love It" Released: October 15, 1991; 5. "The Force Behind The Power" Released: January 15, 1992; 6. "One Shining Moment" Released: July 1992; 7. "Heart (Don't Change My Mind)" Released: September 1992

Professional ratings
Review scores
Source	Rating
AllMusic	2/5 stars
Chicago Tribune	2/4 stars
Robert Christgau	(dud)
Entertainment Weekly	C
Los Angeles Times	1.5/4 stars
NME	5/10

The Force Behind the Power is the nineteenth studio album by American singer Diana Ross, released on September 10, 1991, by Motown Records. The album reached No. 11 on the UK Albums chart and became the biggest selling studio album of her career there, selling over half a million copies in the UK alone.

== Singles ==
The album spun off five hit singles in the UK — most successfully "When You Tell Me That You Love Me" which reached No. 2 on the UK Singles chart (and No. 26 on the Billboard Adult Contemporary chart), earning a BPI Silver disc for UK sales of over 200,000 copies. "One Shining Moment" and the album's Stevie Wonder-produced title track reached numbers 10 and 27 on the UK singles chart, respectively.

"If We Hold on Together" reached No. 11 on the UK singles chart, while a cover of Barbra Streisand's "Heart (Don't Change My Mind)" reached No. 31 on the UK singles chart.

"No Matter What You Do", a duet with Al B. Sure!, peaked at number 4 on the Billboard Hot R&B Singles chart, while "You're Gonna Love It" written by Cydney Davis and Lloyd Tolbert reached No. 24 on the US Dance/Club Play chart.

"If We Hold on Together" was originally recorded for Don Bluth's 1988 animated adventure film The Land Before Time. It rose to prominence after it was released as a single worldwide in the latter part of 1988 (most prominently in Japan in 1990, after it was used as the theme song for the TBS drama Omoide ni Kawaru Made). It reached No. 1 on the Japanese International single charts for 12 weeks making it the biggest selling record by a foreign artist; and in total, sold over 465,000 copies.

== Commercial reception ==
In the UK the album certified platinum for sales exceeding 300,000 copies.

== Track listings ==
US edition

1. "Change of Heart" (Terry Britten, Graham Lyle) – 4:02
2. "When You Tell Me That You Love Me" (John Bettis, Albert Hammond) – 4:13
3. "Battlefield" (Paul Carrack, Nick Lowe) – 3:35
4. "Blame It on the Sun" (Stevie Wonder, Syreeta Wright) – 3:55
5. "Heavy Weather" (Michael Sembello) – 4:59
6. "The Force Behind the Power" (Stevie Wonder) – 4:45
7. "Heart (Don't Change My Mind)" (Robbie Buchanan, Diane Warren) – 4:19
8. "Waiting in the Wings" (Andy Hill, Pete Sinfield) – 4:52
9. "One Shining Moment" (Vaneese Thomas) – 4:48
10. "You're Gonna Love It" (Cydney Davis, Lloyd Tolbert) – 5:11
11. "If We Hold on Together" (James Horner, Will Jennings) – 4:09

International edition

1. "Change of Heart" (Britten, Lyle) – 4:03
2. "When You Tell Me That You Love Me" (Bettis, Hammond) – 4:13
3. "Battlefield" (Carrack, Lowe) – 3:35
4. "Blame It on the Sun" (Wonder, Wright) – 3:55
5. "You're Gonna Love It" (Davis, Tolbert) – 5:11
6. "Heavy Weather" (Sembello) – 4:59
7. "The Force Behind the Power" (Wonder) – 4:42
8. "Heart (Don't Change My Mind)" (Buchanan, Warren) – 4:19
9. "Waiting in the Wings" (Hill, Sinfield) – 4:52
10. "You and I" (Dormer, Goldo, Vigil) – 4:09
11. "One Shining Moment" (Thomas) – 4:48
12. "If We Hold on Together" (James Horner, Barry Mann, Will Jennings) – 4:13
13. "No Matter What You Do" (duet with Al B. Sure!) (Brown, West) – 5:09

== Personnel ==
- Diana Ross – vocals
- John Barnes – keyboards (1, 5, 9), synthesizers (1, 5, 6, 9), synthesizer programming (1, 5, 6, 9), Synclavier (1, 5, 6, 9), Synclavier programming and arrangements (1, 5, 6, 9)
- Lloyd Tolbert – keyboards (1, 5, 9), synthesizer programming (1, 5, 6, 9), arrangements (1, 5, 9)
- Kevin Perry – additional programming (1, 5, 6, 9)
- Andrew Scheps – additional programming (1, 5, 6, 9)
- James Anthony Carmichael – arrangements (1, 5, 6, 9), keyboards (6), synthesizers (6)
- Robbie Buchanan – keyboards (2–4, 8, 9)
- Andrew Gold – organ (3), acoustic guitar (3)
- Stevie Wonder – all instruments (7), arrangements (7), choir arrangements (7)
- Rob Arbittier – programming (7)
- Atle Bakken – programming (7)
- Malcolm Cecil – programming (7)
- Randy Kerber – keyboards (12)
- Guy Moon – keyboards (12)
- Al B. Sure! – keyboards (13), vocals (13), backing vocals (13)
- Kyle West – keyboards (13)
- Carlos Rios – guitars (1, 5, 6, 9)
- Michael Landau – guitars (2–4, 8, 11)
- Waddy Wachtel – guitars (12)
- Freddie Washington – bass (2–4, 8)
- Larry Klein – bass (11)
- Leland Sklar – bass (12)
- Carlos Vega – drums (2–4, 8, 9)
- Russ Kunkel – drums (12)
- Michael Fisher – percussion (2–4, 8, 9, 11), vibraphone (3)
- Nathaniel Kunkel – percussion (9)
- Warren Ham – harmonica (3, 6)
- John Helliwell – saxophone (8)
- David Campbell – BGV arrangements, orchestra arrangements and conductor (2–4, 8, 11, 12)
- Gavyn Wright – orchestra leader (2–4, 8, 11, 12)
- Isobel Griffiths – orchestra contractor (2–4, 8, 11, 12)
- Marva King – backing vocals (1, 5, 6, 9)
- Arnold McCuller – backing vocals (1, 5, 6, 9)
- Deborah Thomas – backing vocals (1, 5, 6, 9)
- Fred White – backing vocals (1, 5, 6, 9)
- Peter Asher – backing vocals (2), tambourine (3), drum and percussion programming (11)
- Valerie Carter – backing vocals (2–4, 8, 11, 12)
- Kate Markowitz – backing vocals (2–4, 8, 11, 12)
- Cydney Davis – backing vocals (5)
- The Andraé Crouch Singers – choir (7)
- Tabitha Brace – backing vocals (13)
- Craig Derry – backing vocals (13)

== Production ==
- Diana Ross – executive producer, design concepts
- Debbie Sandridge – A&R direction
- James Anthony Carmichael – producer (1, 5, 6, 9)
- Peter Asher – producer (2–4, 8, 10–12)
- Stevie Wonder – producer (7)
- Nathan Watts – associate producer (7)
- Al B. Sure! – producer (13)
- Kyle West – producer (13)
- Stephanie Andrews – project coordinator (7)
- Marylata E. Jacob – album coordinator
- Dennis Woloch – art direction
- Painting – Barry Kamen
- Herb Ritts – photography
- Rosanne Shelnutt – marketing direction
- Judith Service – assistant to Diana Ross

Technical credits

- Chris Bellman – mastering at Bernie Grundman Mastering (Hollywood, California)
- Calvin Harris – recording (1, 5, 6, 9), mixing (1, 5, 6, 9)
- Jack Rouben – recording (1, 5, 6, 9)
- Frank Wolf – recording (2–4, 8, 10–12), mixing (2–4, 8, 10–12)
- Steve Van Arden – recording (7), mixing (7)
- Larry Alexander – recording (13)
- Eddie F – recording (13)
- Mark Harder – recording (13)
- Roey Shamir – recording (13)
- Eric Stark – recording (13)
- Al B. Sure! – recording (13)
- Mark Hagen – assistant engineer (1, 5, 6, 9)
- Andrew Scheps – assistant engineer (1, 5, 6, 9)
- Bryant Arnett – assistant engineer (2–4, 8, 10–12)
- Darren Godwin – assistant engineer (2–4, 8, 10–12)
- Mike Harlow – assistant engineer (2–4, 8, 10–12)
- Nathaniel Kunkel – assistant engineer (2–4, 8, 10–12)
- Ken Lauber – assistant engineer (2–4, 8, 10–12)
- Gil Morales – assistant engineer (2–4, 8, 10–12)
- Jimmy Sandweiss – assistant engineer (7)
- R.R. Harlan – digital editing (7)
- Keith Evans – recording assistant (13)
- Michael Gilbert – recording assistant (13)
- Marnie Riley – mix assistant (13)

== Charts ==
Chart performance for The Force Behind the Power
Chart (1991–1992)	Peak position
Australian Albums (ARIA)	100
Dutch Albums (Album Top 100)	32
European Top 100 Albums (Music & Media)	30
Swedish Albums (Sverigetopplistan)	43
Swiss Albums (Schweizer Hitparade)	37
UK Albums (OCC)	11
US Billboard 200	102
US Cashbox Top 200 Pop Albums	55

== Certifications ==
Region	Certification	Certified units/sales
United Kingdom (BPI)	Platinum	300,000^{^}
^{^} Shipments figures based on certification alone.
