= Adventures in the Land of the Good Groove =

Studio album by Nile Rodgers
- Released: 11 March 1983
- Recorded: 1983
- Studio: Power Station, New York City
- Genre: Funk; worldbeat
- Length: 41:39
- Label: Mirage Music, Atlantic
- Producer: Nile Rodgers

Nile Rodgers chronology
Adventures in the Land of the Good Groove (1983)	B-Movie Matinee (1985)

Adventures in the Land of the Good Groove is the first solo studio album by American R&B guitarist, producer and founder of band Chic, Nile Rodgers. Following a number of commercial failures with Chic, Rodgers struck out on his own writing and producing his first solo album. The album was not a commercial success.

== Background ==
Years later in his autobiography, Rodgers described his feelings about the album at the time "I knew it was a flop right away. I'd been so afraid of being labelled a disco musician that I was too tentative about the album's direction. And the songs weren't hooky enough. Over all, I wasn't clear philosophically or sure what I was trying to say."

== Cover ==
The cover shows a faux antique map of the 17th century which uses Lower Manhattan to represent ‘The Land of the Good Groove’. dog latin is used. For example, Brooklyn is labelled Terra Incognita and New Jersey is Nova Joisea. Some of Lower Manhattan's streets and avenues are shown as Twenty-Thirdium, Houstanus, Canalus and Via Broadicus. Other areas include Tribeccium, Terra Financicus and Villagius Easticus.

== Reception ==
Professional ratings
Review scores
Source	Rating
Allmusic	3/5 stars
Robert Christgau	A−
Smash Hits	10/10

Smash Hits gave the album a rare 10/10 score calling it "Amazing! Incredible!...the best thing I've heard in five years. If David Bowie's LP is half as good it will be excellent". Greg Tate of Record commented that the album "comes closer to breaking a syncopated sweat than any recent Chic productions, and is also looser, raunchier and more fun to listen to than Chic usually is." However, while he was very complimentary to the album in terms of pure groove, he felt that it was lacking in passion and somewhat "contrived", particularly in comparison to other recent funk albums by The Time and Steve Arrington's Hall of Fame, while Rolling Stone's Barry Michael Cooper wrote "Perhaps Adventures in the Land of the Good Groove will revive the semiconscious Chic, whose career is at a low point, and transport Nile Rodgers and Bernard Edwards back to the top of the charts with their next album."

The album ended up having the opposite effect, contributing to Chic's disbanding as Rodgers and Edwards pursued their personal projects. However, upon reviving Chic in 2015, Rodgers created the "Land of the Good Groove" record label.

== Track listing ==
All tracks written by Nile Rodgers.

Side A
No.	Title	Length
1.	"The Land of the Good Groove"	5:05
2.	"Yum-Yum"	5:36
3.	"Beet"	4:13
4.	"Get Her Crazy"	6:14

Side B
No.	Title	Length
5.	"It's All in Your Hands"	4:50
6.	"Rock Bottom"	5:50
7.	"My Love Song for You"	4:24
8.	"Most Down"	5:37

2008 Remaster
No.	Title	Length
9.	"The Land of the Good Groove" (Extended Version)	6:42
10.	"Yum-Yum" (Extended Version)	6:57

== Personnel ==
- Nile Rodgers – lead and backing vocals, drums, guitar, keyboards
- Sarah Dash – lead vocals
- Carmine Rojas, Curtis King, David Spinner, Eddie Martinez, Fonzi Thornton, Frank Simms, George Simms, John Wright, Kenny Williams, Phillip Balou, Rachel Sweet – backing vocals
- Bernard Edwards – bass guitar, backing vocals
- Tony Thompson – drums, backing vocals
- Jeremy Steele – guitar
- Raymond Jones – piano, keyboards
- Rob Sabino – keyboards

=== Production ===
Recorded and mixed at The Power Station

- Nile Rodgers – producer
- Jason Corsaro – sound engineer
- Bob Ludwig, at Masterdisk – mastering
