= Sylver Logan Sharp =

- Born: New York, United States
- Occupations: Singer, Songwriter, Producer, Jewelry Designer
- Formerly of: Chic
- Website: sylverlogansharp.com

Sylver Logan Sharp is an American singer, songwriter and actress, she was the lead vocalist with Nile Rodgers and Chic since the early 1990s and continued to tour with them until 2010.

In 2005, her song "All This Time", written by Jonathan Peters, became a huge hit in clubs and dance stations in large cities such as WKTU in New York, KNHC in Seattle or KNGY in San Francisco.

The following year, in 2006, Sharp released a new single entitled Don't Give Up (On You), which was in digital-format only and not released to radio. It is available on iTunes.

In between gigs, she manages and creates designs her own line of custom jewelry - Sylverwear - in Washington, DC.

Celebrity clients include: Chaka Khan, Roberta Flack, Grace Jones, Yolanda Adams, Kirk Franklin, Seal, Elton John, Angie Stone, Kid Rock, Linda Dano, Erika Slezak and soap stars of ABC's One Life to Live and CBS' Guiding Light.

== Discography ==
=== Albums ===
- Place To Begin (2009)
- The Groovement (2017)

=== Singles ===
- Right Through Me (2004)
- All this Time (2005) #1 on Hot Dance Airplay
- Don't Give Up (2007)
- Little Things (2015)
- Find Me (2016)
