= Nile Rodgers =

American guitarist (born 1952)

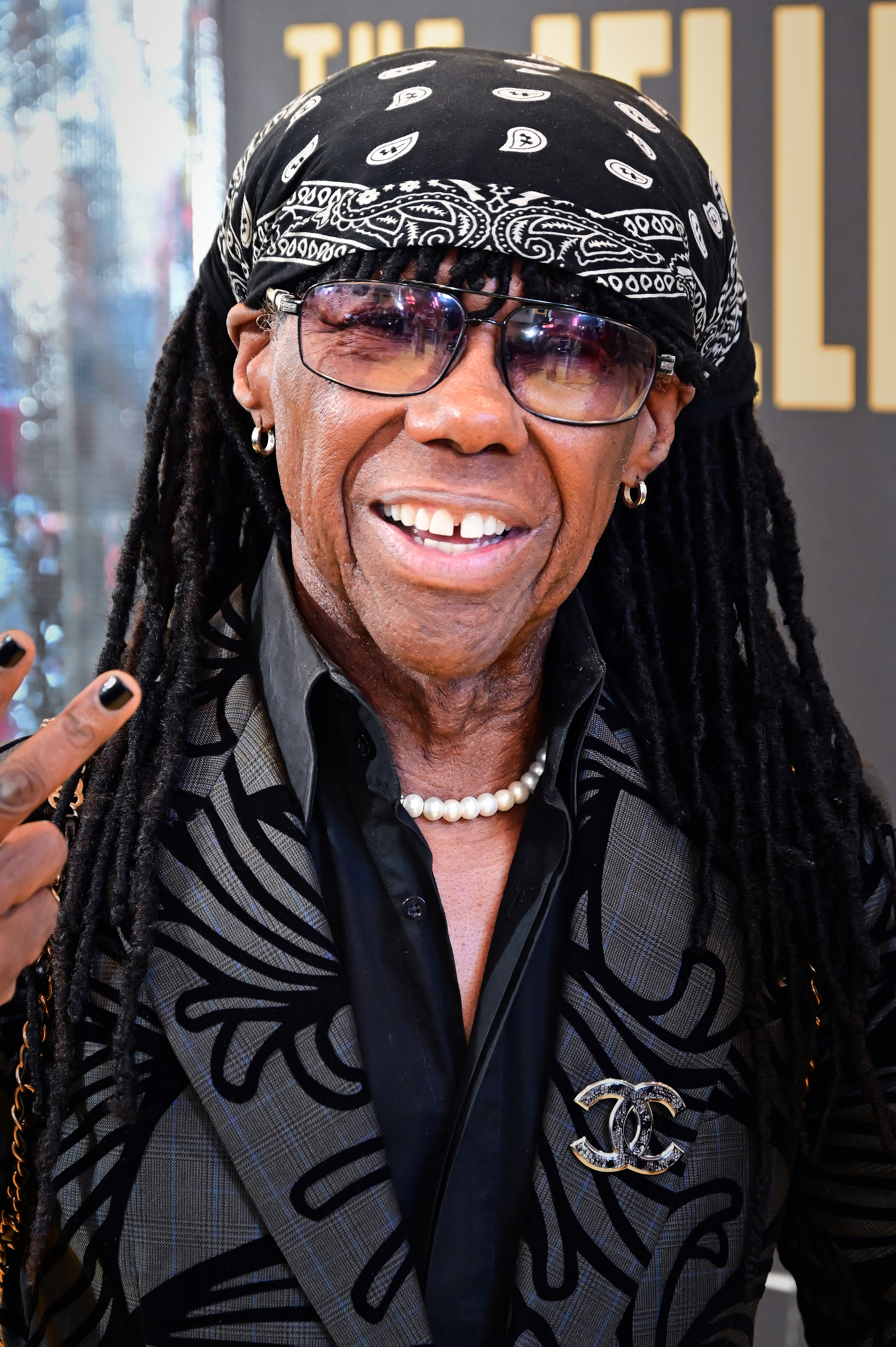
- Rodgers in 2026

Background information
- Born: Nile Gregory Rodgers Jr. September 19, 1952 (age 74); New York City, U.S.
- Genres: Disco; soul; R&B; rock; funk
- Occupations: Guitarist; songwriter; record producer; philanthropist
- Instruments: Guitar; vocals
- Years active: 1972–present
- Labels: Warner; Sumthing; Atlantic; Virgin; Mirage
- Member of: Chic
- Website: nilerodgers.com

Nile Gregory Rodgers Jr. (born September 19, 1952) is an American guitarist. The co-founder of Chic, he has written, produced, and performed on records that have sold more than 750 million albums and 100 million singles worldwide.

Formed as the Big Apple Band in 1972 with bassist Bernard Edwards, Chic released their self-titled debut album in 1977; it featured the hit singles "Dance, Dance, Dance (Yowsah, Yowsah, Yowsah)" and "Everybody Dance". The 1978 album C'est Chic included "I Want Your Love" and "Le Freak", with the latter selling more than seven million singles worldwide. The song "Good Times" from the 1979 album Risqué was a number one single on the pop and soul charts, and became one of the most-sampled songs of all time.

With Edwards, Rodgers wrote and produced music for other artists, including the songs "He's the Greatest Dancer" and "We Are Family" (for Sister Sledge) and "I'm Coming Out" and "Upside Down" (for Diana Ross). After Chic's breakup in 1983, Rodgers produced albums and singles for other artists, including David Bowie's Let's Dance; "Original Sin" by INXS; Duran Duran's "The Reflex" and "Notorious"; and Madonna's Like a Virgin. He also worked with artists including Kylie Minogue, the B-52s, Keith Urban, Jeff Beck, Avicii, Kygo, Daft Punk, Mick Jagger, Coldplay, Bryan Ferry, Christina Aguilera, Lady Gaga, George Michael and Beyoncé. He won three Grammy Awards in 2014 for his work on Daft Punk's Random Access Memories, and two in 2023 for his work with Beyoncé on her album Renaissance. He is the co-founder of We Are Family Foundation, a nonprofit founded following the September 11 attacks.

Rodgers is a Songwriters Hall of Fame inductee and was inducted into the Rock and Roll Hall of Fame via the Award for Musical Excellence. He has received the Grammy Lifetime Achievement/Special Merit Award. Known for his chucking guitar style, Rolling Stone placed Rodgers 7th on a list of the 250 greatest guitarists of all time, writing: "There's 'influential,' then there's 'massively influential', then there's Nile Rodgers... a true innovator who never slows down, still making history with his guitar." He appeared on the New York Times list of the greatest living American songwriters in 2026.

== Early life ==
Rodgers was born on September 19, 1952, in New York City on the Lower East Side of Manhattan, to Beverly Goodman. She gave birth to Rodgers when she was 14. His biological father, Nile Rodgers Sr., was a travelling percussionist who specialized in Afro-Cuban beats and was rarely present as Rodgers grew up; although influential in his life, Rodgers saw his father only a "handful" of times prior to his death in 1970. In 1959, Goodman married Bobby Glanzrock. Rodgers described Glanzrock in his 2011 autobiography as a "beatnik PhD, whose observations had angles that would make Miles Davis contemplate his cool." Richard Pryor, Thelonious Monk, and Lenny Bruce often visited their home in Greenwich Village. Glanzrock and Goodman were addicted to heroin, and Rodgers began using drugs at 13.

Before learning to play the guitar at 16, Rodgers played the flute and the clarinet. As a teenager, he played guitar with African, Persian, Latin, jazz and Boogaloo bands. He became a subsection leader of the Lower Manhattan branch of the New York Black Panther Party. He was raised as a Catholic.

Rodgers' cousin, trumpeter Robert "Spike" Mickens, was a member of Kool & the Gang from 1964 to 1986.

== Career ==
=== 1970s: Formation of Chic, "Le Freak", Sister Sledge ===
Rodgers met bassist Bernard Edwards in 1970 while working as a touring musician for the Sesame Street stage show. Together they formed The Big Apple Band and initially worked as back-up musicians for the vocal group New York City ("I'm Doin' Fine Now"). New York City's one hit allowed them to tour extensively, opening for The Jackson 5 on the American leg of their first world tour in 1973. The band dissolved after their second album failed to yield a hit.

Rodgers and Edwards subsequently joined forces with drummer Tony Thompson to form the Boys, playing gigs up and down the East Coast. Although there was label interest, record companies passed on the band after discovering its members were Black, believing that Black rock artists would be too hard to promote.

As the Big Apple Band, Rodgers and Edwards worked with Ashford & Simpson and Luther Vandross, among others. Since another New York artist, Walter Murphy, had a band called The Big Apple Band, in 1977 Rodgers and Edwards changed the band's name to Chic.

Inspired by Roxy Music, Chic developed a sound that was a fusion of jazz, soul, and funk grooves with melodies and lyrics with a European influence. Between gigs, they recorded the song "Dance, Dance, Dance", with then-boss Luther Vandross on vocals. Originally released by Buddah Records, it was a hit when it was re-released by Atlantic in the summer of 1977. Atlantic picked up an album option with Rodgers and Edwards, who quickly wrote more songs, and Chic's self-titled debut was released in November.

The band scored numerous top ten hits, including "Le Freak", "I Want Your Love", "Everybody Dance", "Dance, Dance, Dance (Yowsah, Yowsah, Yowsah)", "My Forbidden Lover", and "Good Times" becoming club/pop/R&B standards. "Le Freak" was Atlantic Records' only triple platinum selling single at the time, and "Good Times" shot to No. 1 in August 1979 despite that year's "Disco Sucks" campaign.

The success of Chic's first singles led Atlantic to offer Rodgers and Edwards the opportunity to produce any act on its roster. They chose Sister Sledge, whose 1979 album, We Are Family, hit No. 3 on the Billboard chart, charting well into 1980. The first two singles, "He's the Greatest Dancer" and the title cut "We Are Family" both reached No. 1 on the R&B chart, and No. 6 and No. 2, respectively on the pop chart. In April 2018, "We Are Family" was selected to be preserved in the Library of Congress.

=== 1980s: Diana Ross, David Bowie, INXS, Madonna, Duran Duran ===
The 1979 disco backlash derailed Chic, and Edwards retreated from work, while Rodgers' drug use accelerated. Rodgers and Edwards delivered their final Atlantic album under contract, Believer, in 1982. They completed one of their last projects together in 1980, writing and producing the album Diana for Diana Ross, which yielded the hits "Upside Down" and "I'm Coming Out". They produced Deborah Harry's 1981 solo album Koo Koo, and produced the hit "Spacer" for the French disco act Sheila and B. Devotion. During the same time period, Chic's song "Good Times" was sampled on the Sugarhill Gang's "Rapper's Delight", the first multiple-platinum hip hop single. The song continued to influence the sounds of others, including Queen's 1980 No. 1 hit "Another One Bites the Dust", and Blondie, who had a No. 1 hit with "Rapture". Following Chic's breakup, Rodgers released his first solo album, Adventures in the Land of the Good Groove.

With Chic no longer occupying most of his time, Rodgers was free to focus on working with other artists. He produced David Bowie's biggest selling album, Let's Dance, which yielded the hit singles "Let's Dance", "China Girl", and "Modern Love". He produced the single "Original Sin" by INXS, and in 1984, he produced Madonna's album Like a Virgin, which scored four hit singles including its title track, "Material Girl", and "Dress You Up". He worked extensively with Duran Duran, remixing their biggest-selling single, "The Reflex", producing "Wild Boys" on their 1984 live album, Arena, and co-producing the album Notorious.

In 1985, Rodgers produced albums for Sheena Easton, Jeff Beck, Thompson Twins, Mick Jagger, and others, and performed at Live Aid with Madonna and the Thompson Twins. He was named the No. 1 Singles Producer in the World by Billboard at the end of the year. At the end of the decade, he produced albums for Grace Jones, Al Jarreau (L is for Lover), Earth Wind and Fire's vocalist Philip Bailey, and performed on "Higher Love" with Steve Winwood, as well as on records for Cyndi Lauper, and others. In 1989, he co-produced the B-52's multi-platinum album Cosmic Thing; it reached No. 4 on the Billboard 200 album chart, and yielded the singles "Love Shack", and "Roam". He produced Workin' Overtime, Diana Ross' return to Motown, and the soundtracks for Alphabet City, Gremlins, White Nights, and The Fly. He later composed an orchestral soundtrack, his first, for the film Coming to America.

Rodgers formed the short-lived experimental band Outloud in 1987, with David Letterman's guitarist, composer, and vocalist Felicia Collins and French session musician, producer, composer, and keyboardist Philippe Saisse; the trio released a single album, Out Loud, on Warner Bros. Records.

=== 1990s: Production, reformed Chic and death of Edwards, Sumthing Else ===
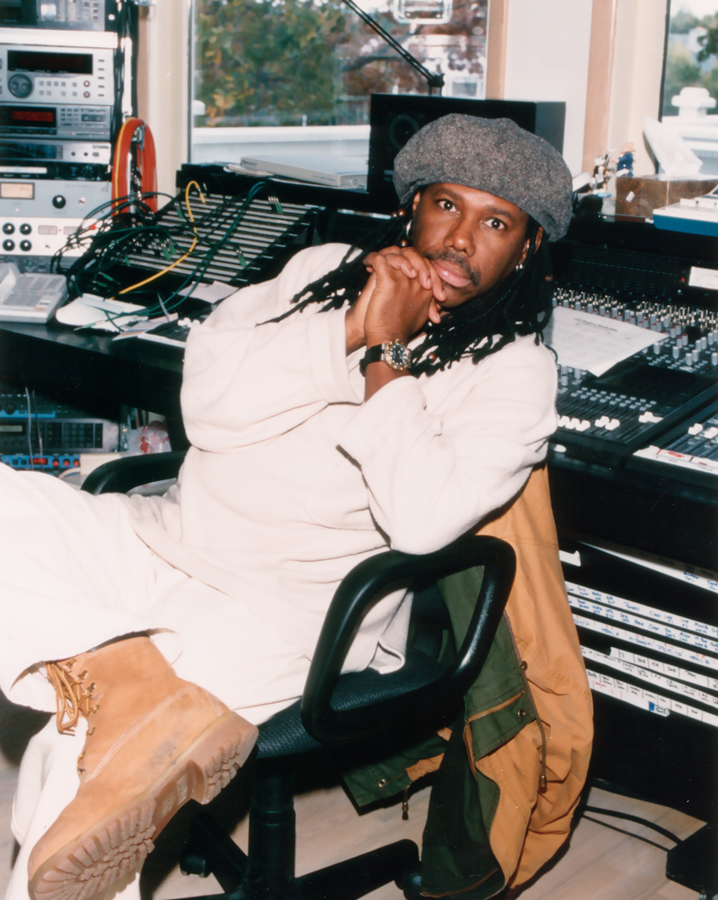
Rodgers at his Le Crib Studios, 1999

In September 1990, shortly after the death of Stevie Ray Vaughan, the Rodgers-produced Vaughan Brothers album Family Style was released. He produced records for David Bowie, Eric Clapton, the B-52s, David Lee Roth, Ric Ocasek, the Stray Cats and others early in the decade, and worked on the soundtracks for Thelma and Louise, Cool World, and The Beavis and Butt-head Experience.

Rodgers and Edwards reformed Chic in 1992 and recorded new material for the album Chic-Ism. In 1996, they released a Japan-only album consisting of old Chic material rerecorded with guest vocalists, Chic Freak and More Treats. Edwards and Rodgers performed with Sister Sledge, Steve Winwood, and Slash in a series of commemorative concerts in Japan.

Edwards died following a concert on April 17, 1996. Rodgers discovered his body. He later said that he "cried like a baby and suffered intensely but eventually realised the best tribute to him would be to carry on and be the best I could be." A year later, Rodgers returned to Japan to pay homage to Edwards, and in 1999, Rodgers released Live at the Budokan, a live recording of Edwards' final performance. The album was not overdubbed or changed in order to keep the recording pure.

Rodgers started playing live concerts again while composing and producing music for the film soundtracks Beverly Hills Cop III, Blue Chips, The Flintstones and Feeling Minnesota, working with Bob Dylan, among others. He played guitar on Seal's cover of "Fly Like an Eagle" for the Space Jam soundtrack, which hit #10 on the Billboard Hot 100 in 1996.

In 1997, The Notorious B.I.G. released "Mo Money Mo Problems" sampling Rodgers and Edwards' song "I'm Coming Out" from Diana Ross's platinum album Diana. "Mo Money, Mo Problems" topped the Billboard Hot 100 for two weeks and was nominated for the 1998 Grammy Award for Best Rap Performance by a Duo or Group.

In 1998, Rodgers founded Sumthing Else Music Works record label and Sumthing Distribution, an independent music label distributor. Sumthing focused on distributing video game soundtracks, and released the world's first 5.1 surround DVD game-soundtrack album. Its titles include the Halo, Resident Evil, Gears of War and Borderlands series.

=== 2000s: Film and video game soundtracks, We Are Family Foundation ===
In the early 2000s, Rodgers worked extensively on film and video game soundtracks, including Halo 2, Rush Hour 2, Snow Dogs, and Semi-Pro starring Will Ferrell, who co-wrote the title song "Love Me Sexy" with Rodgers.

In 2002, Rodgers returned to work again with the original five members of Duran Duran when he co-produced Astronaut. The album rose to No. 3 in the UK.

Following the September 11 attacks, Rodgers brought together more than 200 musicians and celebrities to record "We Are Family". It was recorded in New York at Avatar Studios (previously The Power Station, where the original recording of "We Are Family" took place in 1978), and in Los Angeles at the Record Plant. The accompanying music video was directed by Spike Lee. An 80-minute documentary, The Making and Meaning of We Are Family, directed by Danny Schechter, premiered at the Sundance Film Festival in 2002. In a collaboration between Disney, Nickelodeon and PBS, more than 100 children's television characters participated in a "We Are Family" children's music video, and on March 11, 2002, Disney Channel, Nickelodeon and PBS aired the video to promote tolerance and diversity on the 6-month anniversary of 9/11. In July 2002, Rodgers co-founded the We Are Family Foundation with his life partner, Nancy Hunt. A non-profit organization that promotes "cultural diversity while nurturing and mentoring the vision, talents, and ideas of young people who are positively changing the world", it is dedicated to the vision of a global family.

=== 2010s: Autobiography, Daft Punk, Songwriters Hall of Fame, It's About Time ===
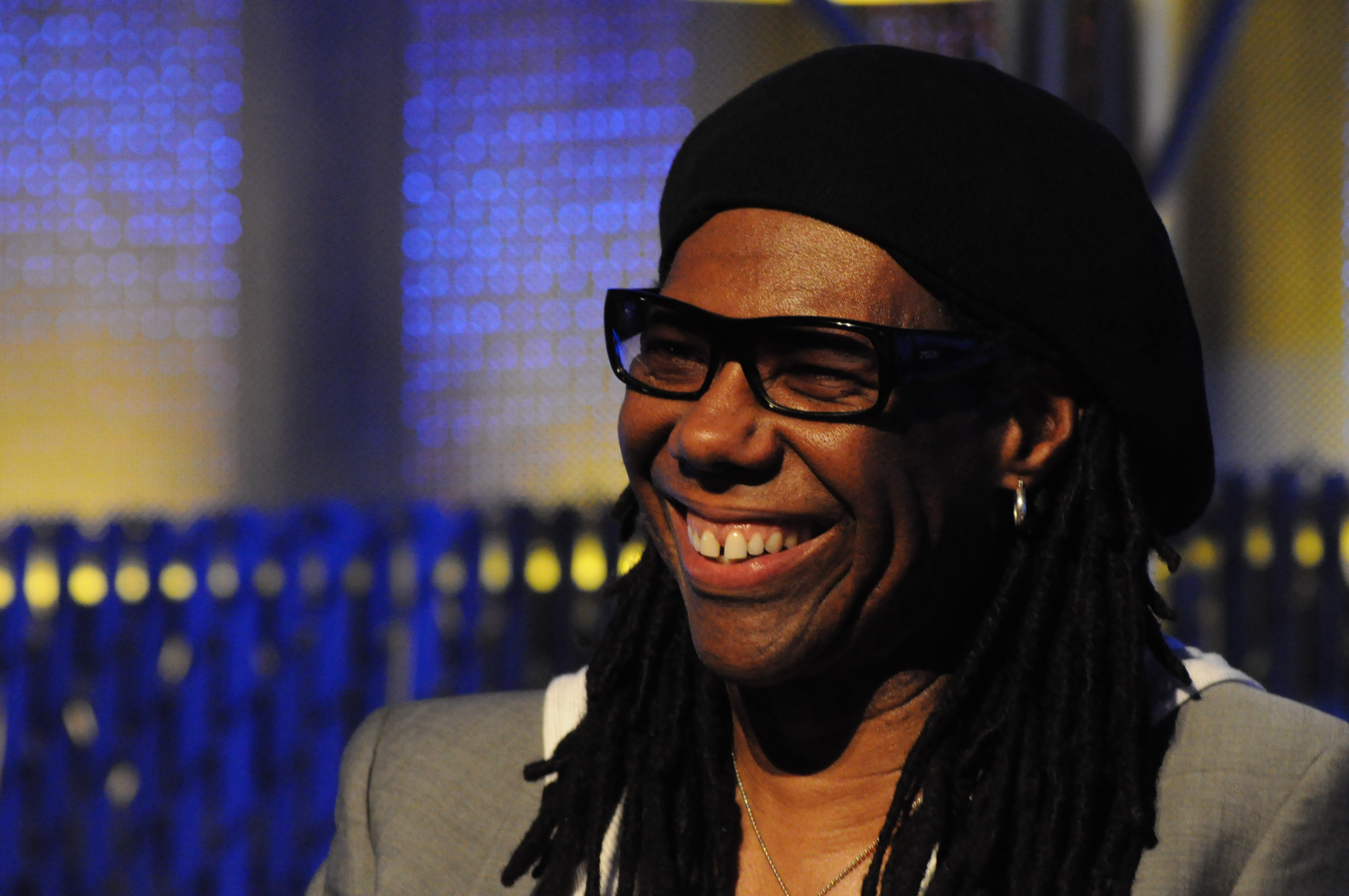
Rodgers in 2010

In 2010, Rhino Records released a four-CD box set, Nile Rodgers Presents The Chic Organization, Volume 1: Savoir Faire, which for the first time collected tracks from all of the acts produced by The Chic Organization up to their original break-up in 1983. Rodgers provided liner notes for the set, which was also reissued in 2013.

Rodgers' critically acclaimed autobiography, Le Freak: An Upside Down Story of Family, Disco, and Destiny was published by Spiegel & Grau, a Random House imprint, in late 2011. It was named one of the top 10 of the 25 Greatest Rock Memoirs of All Time by Rolling Stone.

In February 2012, Rodgers announced that he was collaborating with electronic band Daft Punk for their latest album, "teasing out their R&B influences". The record, Random Access Memories was released in 2013. Rodgers co-wrote and played guitar on three tracks: "Give Life Back to Music", "Lose Yourself to Dance", and "Get Lucky". In April, "Get Lucky" entered the UK Singles Chart at No. 3, only 24 hours after its release, and two weeks later rose to No. 1. In an interview with Official Charts Company, Rodgers said, "I've had big records and Number 1s; I have had records that were Number 1 in the United States but nowhere else ... I've had records which have done well [in the UK], but not in the States. But to have this ubiquitous record, that is a hit everywhere ... It's amazing to me! I'm out on the road and I can hear it wherever I go. I'm flabbergasted!" "Get Lucky" became one of the UK's biggest-selling singles of all time.

Rhino Records released Nile Rodgers Presents The Chic Organization Up All Night (The Greatest Hits), a compilation album featuring songs written, played or produced by Rodgers and Bernard Edwards for Chic and various artists, including Diana Ross, Sister Sledge, Carly Simon, Debbie Harry, Johnny Mathis, Sheila & B. Devotion and Norma Jean Wright. Up All Night reached No. 2 on the UK Compilation Album Chart for the week ending July 13, 2013. In October 2013, Rhino released Nile Rodgers Presents The Chic Organization Up All Night (The Greatest Hits Disco Edition), which included a medley taken from Chic ft. Nile Rodgers' live performance at the 2013 Glastonbury Festival.

Rodgers and Bernard Edwards were nominated to the Songwriters Hall of Fame in October 2013. In January 2014, Rodgers performed "Get Lucky" with Daft Punk on the Grammy Awards, along with Pharrell Williams and Stevie Wonder, with a medley including elements of Chic's "Le Freak" and Wonder's "Another Star". Rodgers won three Grammy Awards for his work with Daft Punk on Random Access Memories, including Best Pop Duo/Group Performance, Record of the Year and Album of the Year. In March, Rolling Stone named Rodgers one of the 50 Most Important People in EDM, stating, "The full scope of Nile Rodgers' career is still hard to fathom, and it's not just ongoing, it's in overdrive." In December, NARAS announced that "Le Freak" would be inducted into The Grammy Hall of Fame.

Rodgers' solo single "Do What You Wanna Do (IMS Anthem)" was released on August 10, 2014 to benefit the We Are Family Foundation. A year later, in March 2015, Rodgers released Chic's first single in more than 23 years, "I'll Be There", with a live streamed concert from The Roundhouse in London. The song was produced using original Chic outtake tapes from the 70s, with Bernard Edwards, Tony Thompson, and vocalists Alfa Anderson and Luci Martin. The song went to No. 1 on Billboard's Dance Music Chart on June 20, 2015. In August, Rodgers launched FOLD Festival (FreakOut! Let's Dance), a multi-day event with a diverse line-up of artists including Beck, Duran Duran, Chaka Khan, Keith Urban, Janelle Monáe, Ginger Minj, Chic and others.

Rodgers collaborated with Lady Gaga to remake Chic's hit, "I Want Your Love" for Tom Ford's Spring/Summer 2016 collection video in lieu of a fashion show.

Rodgers and Bernard Edwards were inducted into the Songwriters Hall of Fame on June 9, 2016. In 2017, after 11 nominations for Chic, Rodgers was inducted into the Rock and Roll Hall of Fame with an award for Musical Excellence. "It's sort of bittersweet," says Rodgers. "I'm quite flattered that they believed that I was worthy, but my band Chic didn't win. They plucked me out of the band and said, 'You're better than Chic.' That's wacky to me ... I am flattered and I think it's cool, but I feel like somebody put me in the lifeboat and told my family they can't get in."

On 25 June 2017, Rodgers and Chic returned to the Glastonbury Festival on the Pyramid Stage. In September of the same year, a version of George Michael's song "Fantasy" was released, credited to "George Michael featuring Nile Rodgers." The track, released as a B-side by Michael's label in 1990, was reworked by Rodgers and featured him prominently on guitar.

In June 2018, "Till the World Falls", the first single from Nile Rodgers & Chic's first album since 1992, It's About Time, was released. The song featured Mura Masa, Cosha and Vic Mensa. The album was released in September 2018, and hit the Top 10 in the UK. It was the first Chic record to hit the Top 10 in 25 years. Two singles from the album were subsequently released: "Sober" featuring Craig David and Stefflon Don, and "Do You Wanna Party" featuring LunchMoney Lewis. In December 2018, Nile Rodgers & Chic began their first UK arena tour. They were nominated for a Brit Award in the "Best International Group Category", in January 2019.

In July 2018, Rodgers co-founded Hipgnosis Songs Fund with Merck Mercuriadis. An IP investment and song management company, Hipgnosis Songs Fund went public later that year.

In November 2018, to mark the 40th anniversary of "Le Freak", Rhino/Atlantic released The Chic Organisation 1977-79, a 6-CD box set containing Chic's first three albums, Sister Sledge's We Are Family and a collection of rarities, including a facsimile of Chic's first single – a 12″ promo for "Dance, Dance, Dance (Yowsah, Yowsah, Yowsah)" released by Buddah Records in 1977.

In January 2019, Rodgers offered 600 free tickets to furloughed US Federal workers during the US Government Shutdown to the Nile Rodgers & Chic concert at the MGM National Harbor in Washington, DC. He played at Cardiff Castle on July 12, 2019, and on February 17, 2020, he participated in Eric Clapton's tribute concert for Ginger Baker.

=== 2020s: Keith Urban, Beyoncé, Grammys, Coldplay ===
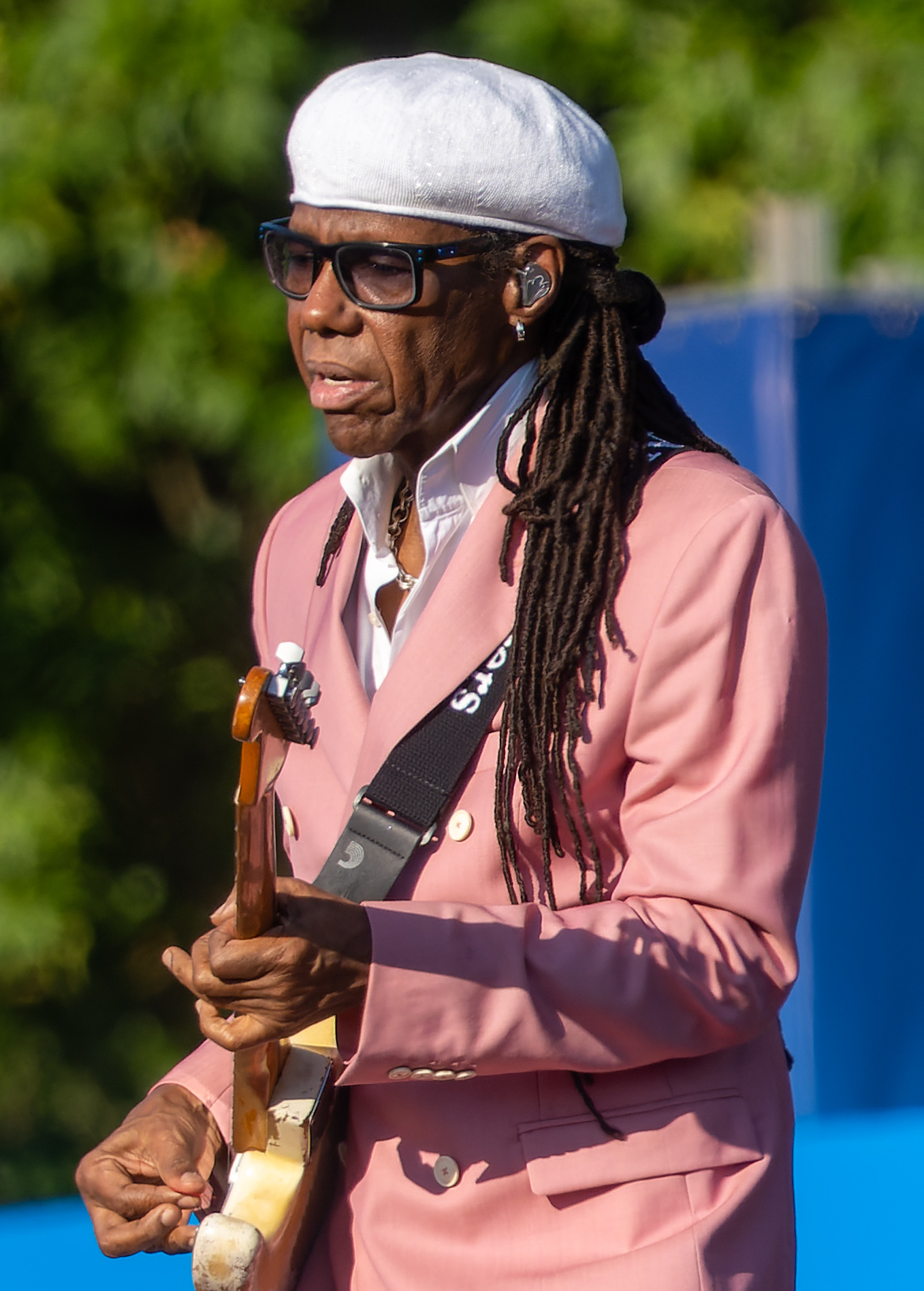
Rodgers performing at BST Hyde Park 2022

Rodgers at the 2024 World Economic Forum

Rodgers has hosted a podcast on Apple Music since August 2020. Titled Deep Hidden Meaning, he has interviewed guests including David Foster, Carole Bayer Sager, Bryan Adams, Timbaland, and Paul McCartney. It was nominated for a British Podcast Award in 2024.

On November 13, 2020, Rodgers was featured on "Stop Crying Your Heart Out" as part of the BBC Radio 2's Allstars' Children in Need charity single. The single debuted at number 7 on the Official UK Singles Chart and number 1 on both the Official UK Singles Sales Chart and the Official UK Singles Download Chart.

Among other artists, in 2021, Rodgers worked with Jack Savoretti (for his album Europiana) and Keith Urban. In April 2021 he teamed with Urban and Breland on the music video for "The Cage", a track from Urban's 2020 album The Speed of Now Part 1. He produced The Big Decider, the first album by The Zutons 13 years.

In the summer of 2021, Rodgers, with Constellation Immersive, launched DiscOasis, an ongoing 1970s-themed disco and roller skating pop-up party at the South Coast Botanic Garden in Rancho Palos Verdes. Developed in part to provide an outside experience during the COVID-19 pandemic, DJs select music from crates of records that Rodgers hand picked from his personal collection.

In July 2022, Hipgnosis Songs Fund was valued at US $2.69 billion.

An asteroid approximately 300 million miles away from Earth was named nilerodgers (191911) in honor of Rodgers' 70th birthday in 2022. Rodgers donated $1 million to the We Are Family Foundation, the organization he co-founded, to mark both his birthday and the foundation's 20th anniversary.

Rodgers performed "Modern Love" and "Let's Dance" with Josh Homme, Omar Hakim and Gaz Coombes at the Taylor Hawkins Tribute Concert at Wembley Stadium on September 3, 2022.

In 2023, Rodgers won two Grammy Awards, for Best Electronic/Dance Album and Best R&B Song ("Cuff It"), for his work with Beyoncé on her 2022 album Renaissance; in the same occasion, he also received the Grammy Lifetime Achievement Award. In the same year, he was featured on the title track of South Korean girl group Le Sserafim's album Unforgiven. He also collaborated with Duran Duran on their single "Black Moonlight", one of three original songs on Duran Duran's Halloween-inspired album Danse Macabre. He also starred in the 2023 Chanel eyewear campaign.

In October 2023, he re-united with Chic for a live performance at NPR's Tiny Desk Concert: the half-hour set included "Le Freak". "Let's Dance", "Get Lucky" and "Soul Glo", a fake commercial jingle Rodgers wrote for the 1988 film Coming to America.

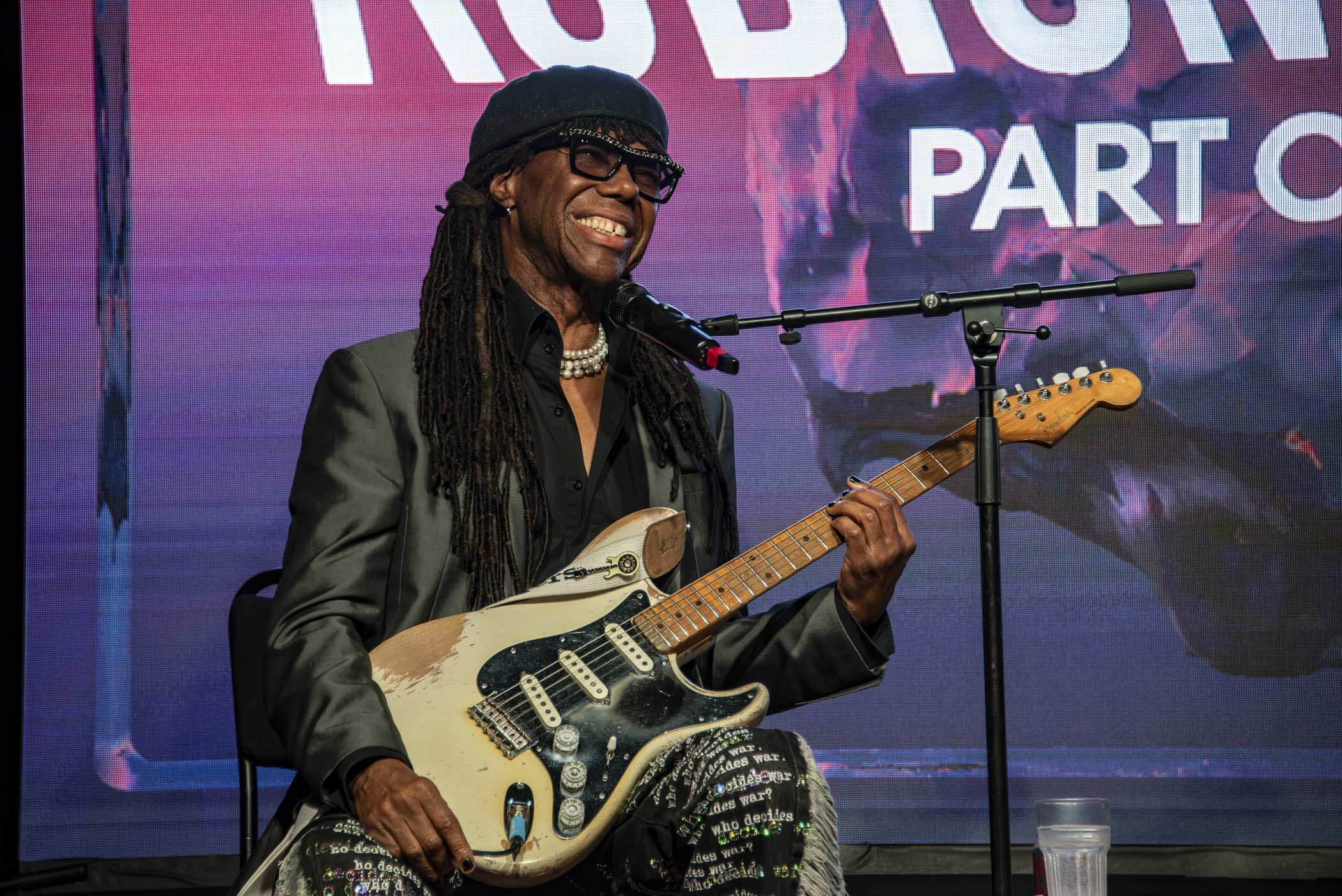
Rodgers at SXSW London 2025.

In January 2024, the World Economic Forum announced that Rodgers would receive its 2024 Crystal Award. Presented during the opening session of the event, the announcement stated that Rodgers would be honored for his "efforts to make the world a more peaceful, equal and inclusive place through his music, his commitment to fighting systemic racism, inequality and injustice, and by championing innovative youth voices." In March, he was named Polar Music Prize Laureate, together with Esa-Pekka Salonen. He was among many star guitarists to contribute to a new version of Mark Knopfler's "Going Home: Theme of the Local Hero" in aid of the Teenage Cancer Trust, produced the song "Electric Energy" (with Ariana DeBose and Boy George) for Maetthew Vaughn's film Argylle, and worked with Alfie Templeman on his second studio album, Radiosoul, featuring on the track "Just A Dance". He provided guitar on Norwegian DJ Kygo's self-titled fifth studio album, on the track "For Life", also featuring English singer Zak Abel. He also provided additional guitar on British pop rock band Coldplay's song "Good Feelings", which features vocals from Nigerian singer Ayra Starr. The song was included on the band's tenth studio album Moon Music.

Nile Rodgers & CHIC performing at the Baloise Session 2026.

Rodgers again worked with Beyoncé on her 2024 album, Cowboy Carter. He was nominated for a 2025 Grammy Award for Best Pop Duo/Group Performance as a writer of "Levii's Jeans" (featuring Post Malone). Rodgers featured on "Talk To Me", with Damiano David and Tyla, which was released in September 2025.

Before the Moment with Nile Rodgers, a podcast from IHeartMedia's Ruby Studio and Lincoln, launched in September 2026. A conversation between Rodgers and his guests about the pivotal moments in their lives and careers, the first episodes in the series feature artists including Sienna Spiro, John Legend, Alex Warren, Miguel, and the Goo Goo Dolls.

== Television and film ==
=== Soundtracks and scores ===
In 1982, Rodgers and Edwards produced the soundtrack for the movie Soup for One. As Chic, they wrote and performed three songs, including the film's title track. Edwards and Rodgers also wrote and produced Carly Simon's "Why", a top 10 hit in the UK that helped resurrect Simon's career. The soundtrack, which also featured Sister Sledge, Debbie Harry, and Teddy Pendergrass, was a bigger hit than the film.

Rodgers became increasingly in-demand as a producer and composer for film and television following the success of the Soup for One soundtrack. In 1984, he produced Al Jarreau's theme for the television series Moonlighting; he wrote, produced and scored the soundtrack for Alphabet City, and in 1986 and worked with Laurie Anderson on her concert film, Home of the Brave. In 1988, in addition to producing the soundtrack for Earth Girls Are Easy, he composed the orchestral score for Eddie Murphy's Coming to America. He also served as the film's music supervisor, and wrote and produced its title track, a hit for The System, and wrote the jingle for the Soul Glo commercial, "the most iconic fake ad in cinematic history."

In 1999, Rodgers executive-produced, scored, music-supervised and appeared in Public Enemy, a documentary about the Black Panthers. In a review of the soundtrack, critic Maria Blandford wrote: "The disc realistically supports the conflicting and controversial nature of this historical period, and opens the arena for present-day discussion and evaluation...this recording is an examination of the American conscience."

Between the mid-1980s and the late 2000s, songs written, produced or performed by Rodgers (and/or Chic) were included in the films or on the soundtracks for Shrek 2 ("Le Freak"), Thelma and Louise, Rush Hour 2, Cool World, Beavis and Butthead Do America, The Flintstones (in collaboration with the B-52s), Summer of Sam, Feeling Minnesota (with Bob Dylan), Curdled, Bowie's Cool World, Snow Dogs, White Hot, Gremlins, That's Dancing! and The Fly, among others. He scored the film Blue Chips, and reunited with Murphy to score Beverly Hills Cop III. He also produced a remake of "Axel F", from the first Beverly Hills Cop, which he performed with Richard Hilton. In 2008, he cowrote Semi-Pro's "Love Me Sexy" with Will Ferrell, who starred in the movie.

In the 2010s, music by Rodgers was featured in movies including Arctic Tale, Trolls and Bridget Jones's Baby, as well as on the TV shows Vinyl, The Get Down, and Horrid Henry, among others. In 2019, he collaborated with Andrew Lloyd Webber on the soundtrack for the film Cats. In 2023 it was announced that he and The-Dream were co-writing music for the Mark Anthony Green horror film, Opus.

=== Television and film appearances ===
Since his 1978 debut with Chic on American Bandstand, Rodgers has performed on more than 150 television programs. He has been the subject of documentaries including the BBC's Nile Rodgers: The Hitmaker, Front and Center: Songwriters Hall of Fame: Nile Rodgers on PBS, Arte France's Nile Rodgers: Secrets of a Hitmaker, and the short film Composing America: The Musical Talents of Nile Rodgers. The BBC also broadcast Nile Rodgers: How To Make It in the Music Business, a three-hour, three part special. In 2018, Once in a Lifetime Sessions with Nile Rodgers premiered on Netflix.

Rodgers has appeared in documentaries about David Bowie, Diana Ross, Elton John, Michael Jackson, Rick James, George Michael, Duran Duran, Daft Punk, Public Enemy, Madonna, Avicii, Studio 54, the Seventies, the Eighties, the Nineties, recorded music, girl groups, the disco era, disco, house music, funk, and soul music. He was featured in the 2023 BBC documentary about Little Richard, Little Richard: King and Queen of Rock’n’Roll.

Rodgers most frequently plays Fender Stratocasters, as well as Gibson Les Pauls and archtop guitars such as the Gibson ES-300 and D'Angelico New Yorker. He auctioned more than 100 guitars and bass guitars from his personal collection to benefit We Are Family Foundation in December 2021.

=== The Hitmaker ===
Rodgers plays a 1960 Fender Stratocaster with a 1959 neck, nicknamed The Hitmaker, which he acquired as a trade-in at a shop in Miami Beach, Florida. Exceptionally light, it has a maple fingerboard and a worn white finish. Rodgers claims it has a unique sound. After Rodgers purchased the guitar, Edwards taught him how to play it in a chop chord style, which he called "chucking". In his autobiography, Rodgers wrote: "He fingered the chords with his left hand, and his right hand would continuously play sixteen notes to the bar while accenting the main parts of the rhythm ... One lesson was all I needed. For the next few nights straight, while my roommate pursued all manner of trysts, I was having a love affair in the bathroom with my new ax. In just a few days, I'd emerge as a chucking funk guitarist who knew more jazz chord inversions than most of my R&B counterparts."

The Fender Custom Shop introduced a limited edition Nile Rodgers Hitmaker Stratocaster, a recreation of Rodgers' guitar, in January 2014.

== Personal life ==
In the early 1990s, Rodgers woke up in the hospital to learn that his heart had stopped eight times and he was alive due only to the actions of the doctor who was filling out his death certificate. He stopped using drugs and alcohol in 1994 after a friend showed him a tape of a performance during which he was inebriated.

Rodgers was diagnosed with an aggressive form of prostate cancer in October 2010. He documented his illness on a blog called Walking on Planet C. He was given the all-clear in 2013. In 2017, a growth on his right kidney was diagnosed as two different cancers within one mass. The mass was surgically removed in November 2017. He said he expected a 100% recovery. At his performance at the Hollywood Bowl, on July 4, 2019, Rodgers announced that he was "100% cancer-free".

Rodgers lived in Westport, Connecticut, until July 2021 when he moved to Miami, Florida, with his life partner, Nancy Hunt.

== Works ==
=== Selected discography ===
Chic

- Chic (1977)
- C'est Chic (1978)
- Risqué (1979)
- Real People (1980)
- Take It Off (1981)
- Soup for One (soundtrack, Chic/various artists) (1982)
- Tongue in Chic (1982)
- Believer (1983)
- Chic-ism (1992)
- It's About Time (2018)

Solo

- Adventures in the Land of the Good Groove (1983)
- B-Movie Matinee (1985)
- Chic Freak and More Treats (1996)

Outloud

- Outloud (1987)

Soundtracks

- Soup for One (1982)
- Alphabet City (1984)
- Coming to America (1988)
- Earth Girls Are Easy (1988)
- White Hot (1989)
- Beverly Hills Cop III (1994)
- Blue Chips (1994)
- Curdled (1996)
- Public Enemy (1999)
- Rise of Nations (2003) Game
- Halo 2 Soundtrack (2004) Game
- Conker: Live & Reloaded (2005) Game
- Perfect Dark Zero (2005) Game
- Halo 3 Soundtrack (2007) Game

Live albums

- Live at the Budokan (1999)
- Up All Night (Chic, various artists) (2013)

==== Selected production discography ====
- Norma Jean, Norma Jean Wright (1978)
- We Are Family, Sister Sledge (1979)
- King of the World, Sheila B. Devotion (1980)
- Love Somebody Today, Sister Sledge (1980)
- diana, Diana Ross (1980)
- I Love My Lady, Johnny Mathis (1981, released in 2017)
- KooKoo, Debbie Harry (1981)
- Let's Dance, David Bowie (1983)
- Talkback, Spoons (1983)
- "Trash It Up", Southside Johnny (1983)
- "Original Sin", INXS (1984)
- Like a Virgin, Madonna (1984)
- "The Reflex", "The Wild Boys", Duran Duran (1984)
- "Out Out'", Peter Gabriel (1984)
- Flash, Jeff Beck (1985)
- She's the Boss, Mick Jagger (1985)
- Here's to Future Days, Thompson Twins, (1985)
- Do You, Sheena Easton (1985)
- When The Boys Meet The Girls, Sister Sledge (1985)
- "Invitation to Dance", Kim Carnes (1985)
- Home of the Brave, Laurie Anderson (1986)
- Notorious, Duran Duran (1986)
- Inside Story, Grace Jones (1986)
- Cosmic Thing, The B-52's (1989)
- Workin' Overtime, Diana Ross (1989)
- Family Style, Vaughan Brothers (1990)
- "Real Cool World", David Bowie (1992)
- Good Stuff, The B-52's (1992)
- Black Tie White Noise, David Bowie (1993)
- Your Filthy Little Mouth, David Lee Roth (1994)
- "We Are Family", Nile Rodgers All Stars (We Are Family Foundation) (2001)
- Only a Woman Like You, Michael Bolton (2002)
- Astronaut, Duran Duran (2004)
- "Hotel Room Service" (Songwriter for Pitbull) (2009)
- "Shady", Adam Lambert ft. Sam Sparro and Nile Rodgers (2012)
- "Get Lucky" ft. Pharrell Williams and Nile Rodgers, Random Access Memories, Daft Punk (2013)
- "Give Life Back to Music", Random Access Memories, Daft Punk (2013)
- "Lose Yourself to Dance" ft. Pharrell Williams and Nile Rodgers, Random Access Memories, Daft Punk (2013)
- "Lay Me Down", Avicii featuring Adam Lambert and Nile Rodgers True, (2013)
- "The Other Boys", NERVO ft. Kylie Minogue, Jake Shears and Nile Rodgers, Collateral (2015)
- "Pressure Off", Duran Duran ft. Janelle Monáe and Nile Rodgers, Paper Gods (2015)
- "Sun Don't Let Me Down", Keith Urban ft. Nile Rodgers & Pitbull (2016)
- "Telepathy", Christina Aguilera ft. Nile Rodgers (2016)
- "Fantasy", George Michael ft. Nile Rodgers (2017)
- "Le Canzoni alla Radio", Max Pezzali ft. Nile Rodgers (2017)
- "Till the World Falls", Nile Rodgers, Chic, Mura Masa ft. Cosha & Vic Mensa (2018)
- "Sober", Nile Rodgers, Chic, ft. Craig David & Stefflon Don (2018)
- "Do You Wanna Party", Nile Rodgers, Chic, ft. LunchMoney Lewis (2018)
- "Emotional", Michelle Treacy (2019)
- "Summer Lover", Oliver Heldens ft. Devin & Nile Rodgers (2019)
- "Roses", Adam Lambert ft. Nile Rodgers (2020)
- "Cielo", Manuel Medrano ft. Nile Rodgers (2020)
- "One More", Times, SG Lewis (2020)
- "Agua", Daddy Yankee ft. Rauw Alejandro & Nile Rodgers (2022)
- "When Someone Loves You", Emeli Sandé & Nile Rodgers (2022)
- "Unforgiven", Le Sserafim ft. Nile Rodgers (2023)
- "Freak 54 (Freak Out)", Pitbull with Nile Rodgers (2023)
- "lock / unlock", j-hope of BTS with Benny Blanco & Nile Rodgers (2024)
- "Levii's Jeans" with Beyoncé and Post Malone (2024)
- "Exodus - Blue Nile Mix" Akiko Moriyako ft. Nile Rodgers (2024)
- "For Life", Kygo ft. Zak Abel and Nile Rodgers (2024)

=== Autobiography ===
- Nile Rodgers (2011). Le Freak: An Upside Down Story of Family, Disco, and Destiny. Spiegel & Grau. ISBN 978-0-385-52965-5.

== Collaborations ==
- Diana — Diana Ross (1980)
- King of the World — Sheila and B. Devotion (1980)
- KooKoo — Debbie Harry (1981)
- Let's Dance — David Bowie (1983)
- Hearts and Bones — Paul Simon (1983)
- Like a Virgin — Madonna (1984)
- Do You — Sheena Easton (1985)
- Boys and Girls — Bryan Ferry (1985)
- She's the Boss — Mick Jagger (1985)
- L Is for Lover — Al Jarreau (1986)
- True Colors — Cyndi Lauper (1986)
- So — Peter Gabriel (1986)
- Inside Story — Grace Jones (1986)
- Inside Out — Philip Bailey (1986)
- Workin' Overtime — Diana Ross (1989)
- Move to This — Cathy Dennis (1990)
- Mariah Carey — Mariah Carey (1990)
- Other Voices — Paul Young (1990)
- Family Style — Vaughan Brothers (1990)
- Fireball Zone — Ric Ocasek (1991)
- Hat Full of Stars — Cyndi Lauper (1993)
- Black Tie White Noise — David Bowie (1993)
- Mamouna — Bryan Ferry (1994)
- HIStory: Past, Present and Future, Book I — Michael Jackson (1995)
- Fly Like an Eagle — Seal (1996)
- Blood on the Dance Floor: HIStory in the Mix — Michael Jackson (1997)
- Mind Body & Soul — Joss Stone (2004)
- Olympia — Bryan Ferry (2010)
- Les chansons de l'innocence retrouvée — Etienne Daho (2013)
- "Lay Me Down" — Avicii and Adam Lambert (2014)
- Avonmore — Bryan Ferry (2014)
- Velvet — Adam Lambert (2020) ("Roses")
- "Out The Cage" — Keith Urban and Breland (2020)
- "Nothing Left but Family" — Rebecca Ferguson (2020)
- "No Words Needed" — Rebecca Ferguson (2021)
- "Up All Night" — The Ramona Flowers (2021)
- "Who's Hurting Who" — Jack Savoretti (2021)
- "Cuff It" — Beyoncé (2022)
- Legendaddy — Daddy Yankee (2022)
- "Passion" — Roosevelt (2022)
- Pre-Code Hollywood — Jonathan Bree (2023)
- Unforgiven — LE SSERAFIM (2023)
  - "Unforgiven – Le Sserafim ft. Nile Rodgers
- Hope on the Street Vol. 1 — J-Hope (2024)
  - "Lock / Unlock" (with Benny Blanco and Nile Rodgers) – J-Hope (2024)
- "For Life" — Kygo, Zak Abel and Nile Rodgers (2024)
- "Radiosoul" — Alfie Templeman (2024)
- "Honey Boy" – Purple Disco Machine and Benjamin Ingrosso ft. Shenseea and Nile Rodgers (2024)
- "This is the Moment" (ft. Nile Rodgers) – Son Mieux (2024)
- "Talk to Me" – Damiano David, Tyla and Nile Rodgers (2025)

== Recognition ==
Year	Organization	Award	Notes
2005	Dance Music Hall of Fame	Inductee	
2005	National Academy of Recording Arts and Sciences; NY Chapter	Governor's Lifetime Achievement Award	
2011	We Are Family Foundation	Humanitarian Award	
2011	New Dramatists	Frederick Loewe Award	For the musical, Double Time, as composer
2012	Drexel University	Honorary Doctorate of Human Letters	
2014	National Academy of Recording Arts and Sciences	Grammy Award	With Daft Punk: Album of the Year; Random Access Memories
2014	National Academy of Recording Arts and Sciences	Grammy Award	With Daft Punk: Record of the Year "Get Lucky"
2014	National Academy of Recording Arts and Sciences	Grammy Award	With Daft Punk; Best Pop Duo/Group Performance "Get Lucky"
2014	Canadian Music Week Festival	The Nile Rodgers Global Creators Award	Presented by Paul Williams
2014	Ivor Novello Awards	Special International Award	Presented by Johnny Marr
2014	International Music Summit	IMS Legends Award	Presented by Simon Le Bon
2014	National Academy of Records Arts and Sciences	Grammy Hall of Fame Inductee	Chic's "Le Freak"
2015	Golden Camera	Lifetime Achievement	
2015	Grammy Hall of Fame	Inductee	Chic's "Le Freak"
2015	BMI	BMI R&B/Hip Hop Icon Award	
2015	National Academy of Recording Arts and Sciences	Honoree of the Producers and Engineers Wing	
2015	Horzu	Goldene Kamera award for musical lifetime achievement	
2016	Songwriters Hall of Fame	Inductee	With Bernard Edwards
2016	British GQ	ICON of the Year	
2016	BBC	BBC Music Day Ambassador	
2016	Ebony	Ebony Icon Award	
2017	Rock and Roll Hall of Fame	11th nomination for Induction	Chic
2017	Rock and Roll Hall of Fame	Inductee	Musical Excellence
2017	National Recording Registry	"We Are Family" recognized for "cultural, artistic and historical importance to American society and the nation's audio heritage."	
2018	Songwriters Hall of Fame	Appointed Chairman	Unanimously elected
2018	Berklee College of Music	Honorary Doctor of Music Degree	
2018	Abbey Road Studios	Appointed Chief Creative Adviser	
2018	Liverpool Institute for the Performing Arts	Companion Award	Presented by Sir Paul McCartney
2018	Global Gift Foundation	Humanitarian Award	
2018	National Recording Registry	"Le Freak" recognized for "cultural, artistic and historical importance to American society and the nation's audio heritage."	
2018	Music Business Association Nashville	Chairman's Award for Sustained Creative Achievements	
2018	Les Paul Foundation	Les Paul Spirit Award	
2019	Artist and Manager Awards (UK)	Artists' Artist Award	
2020	Royal Northern College of Music	Honorary professorship	
2020	Sky Arts	Portrait of the Year	Portrait by Christabel Blackburn displayed at Royal Albert Hall
2021	Songwriters Hall of Fame	Unanimously re-elected Chairman for 2nd three-year term	
2023	National Academy of Recording Arts and Sciences	Lifetime Achievement/Special Merit Award	
2023	National Academy of Recording Arts and Sciences	Grammy Award	With Beyoncé: Best R&B Song "Cuff It"
2023	National Academy of Recording Arts and Sciences	Grammy Award	With Beyoncé: Best Dance/Electronic Album; Renaissance
2023	The Radio Academy	ARIAS Award Best Music Special	Deep Hidden Meaning With Nile Rodgers
2024	World Economic Forum	Crystal Award	
2024	Muhammad Ali Center	Muhammad Ali Global Citizenship Award	For his work with We Are Family Foundation
2024	Polar Music	Polar Music Prize	
2024	Rolling Stone UK	Global Icon Award	
2025	Grammis - Sweden	Song of the Year for "Honey Boy"	for "Honey Boy" (Purple Disco Machine and Benjamin Ingrosso with Shenseea and Rodgers)
2026	Glaucoma Foundation	Chairman’s Spotlight Award	
2026	Paid in Full Foudation	Quincy Jones Achievement Award	
