= Sheila discography =

- Studio albums: 27
- Live albums: 7
- Compilation albums: 17
- Singles: 97
- Video albums: 5
- Box sets: 10

This is the discography of French singer Sheila, including as part of Sheila and B. Devotion.

== Albums ==
=== Studio albums ===
Title	Album details	Peak chart positions					
Title	Album details	FRA	AUS	BEL (WA)	QUE	SWE	SWI
Le Sifflet des copains	Released: November 1963; Label: Philips; Formats: LP	40	—	—	1	—	—
Écoute ce disque	Released: November 1964; Label: Philips; Formats: LP	60	—	—	—	—	—
Tous les deux	Released: November 1965; Label: Philips; Formats: LP	45	—	—	—	—	—
L'heure de la sortie – Bang-bang	Released: November 1966; Label: Philips; Formats: LP	35	—	—	—	—	—
Dans une heure	Released: November 1967; Label: Carrere; Formats: LP	4	—	—	—	—	—
Long sera l'hiver – La vamp	Released: October 1968; Label: Carrere; Formats: LP	5	—	—	—	—	—
Oncle Jo	Released: November 1969; Label: Carrere; Formats: LP, MC	3	—	—	—	—	—
Reviens je t'aime	Released: December 1970; Label: Carrere; Formats: LP, MC	5	—	—	—	—	—
Love	Released: November 1971; Label: Carrere; Formats: LP, MC	—	—	—	7	—	—
Poupée de porcelaine	Released: December 1972; Label: Carrere; Formats: LP, MC	—	—	—	—	—	—
Spécial Sheila – Ringo	Released: October 1973; Label: Carrere; Formats: LP, MC; Split with Ringo	6	—	—	—	—	—
Sheila – Ringo	Released: October 1974; Label: Carrere; Formats: LP, MC; Split with Ringo	—	—	—	—	—	—
Quel tempérament de feu	Released: November 1975; Label: Carrere; Formats: LP, MC	8	—	—	—	—	—
L'amour qui brûle en moi	Released: November 1976; Label: Carrere; Formats: LP, MC	2	—	—	—	—	—
Singin' in the Rain – Love Me Baby	Released: September 1977; Label: Carrere; Formats: LP, MC, 8-track; As Sheila B. Devotion	2	48	—	7	8	—
King of the World	Released: 27 June 1980; Label: Carrere; Formats: LP, MC; As Sheila and B. Devotion	199 (Note: Chart position is from 2016.)	—	21 (Note: Chart position is from 2020.)	—	—	—
Pilote sur les ondes	Released: 24 September 1980; Label: Carrere; Formats: LP, MC	—	—	—	—	—	—
Little Darlin'	Released: 4 November 1981; Label: Carrere; Formats: LP, MC	—	—	59 (Note: Chart position is from 2021.)	—	—	—
On dit...	Released: 13 April 1983; Label: New Era 83; Formats: LP, MC	—	—	—	—	—	—
Je suis comme toi	Released: 13 November 1984; Label: Carrere; Formats: LP, MC	—	—	—	—	—	—
Tendances	Released: 18 October 1988; Label: Zoé Production/Marshe; Formats: CD, LP, MC	—	—	—	—	—	—
Le meilleur de Sheila	Released: January 1998; Label: Flarenasch/Arcade; Formats: CD, MC	33	—	—	—	—	—
Dense	Released: 9 November 1999; Label: EMI/Marshe; Formats: CD, MC	56	—	—	—	—	—
Seulement pour toi	Released: 4 September 2002; Label: Warner Music; Formats: CD	47	—	—	—	—	—
Solide	Released: 7 December 2012; Label: WEA/Warner Music; Formats: CD	53	—	52	—	—	—
Venue d'ailleurs	Released: 2 April 2021; Label: Warner Music; Formats: CD, LP, MC, digital download	11	—	4	—	—	25
À l'avenir	Released: 4 April 2025; Label: Warner Music; Formats: CD, LP, digital download	—	—	12	—	—	—
"—" denotes releases that did not chart or were not released in that territory.

=== Live albums ===
Title	Album details	Peak chart positions	
Title	Album details	FRA	BEL (WA)
Sheila au Zénith	Released: 1985; Label: Carrere/New Era 83; Formats: 2×LP, MC	—	—
Je suis venue te dire que je m'en vais – Ses plus grands succès	Released: 1989; Label: Zoé Production; Formats: CD, 2×LP, MC	—	—
Sheila live à l'Olympia 98	Released: 1998; Label: Flarenasch/Wagram Music; Formats: 2×CD, MC	—	—
Sheila en concert à l'Olympia 2002 – Jamais deux sans toi	Released: 5 May 2003; Label: Sony Music; Formats: 2×CD	54	—
C'est écrit	Released: 21 January 2008; Label: WEA/Marshe; Formats: CD+DVD	56	64
Live au Casino de Paris	Released: 27 April 2018; Label: Warner Music; Formats: 2×CD	81	172
Live à Bruxelles	Released: 20 October 2023; Label: Warner Music; Formats: 2×CD	26	19
"—" denotes releases that did not chart or were not released in that territory.

=== Compilation albums ===
Title	Album details	Peak chart positions	
Title	Album details	FRA	BEL (WA)
The Yé Yé Girl	Released: August 1964; Label: Philips; Formats: LP; US-only release	—	—
Le disque d'or de Sheila – Volume 1	Released: November 1967; Label: Philips; Formats: LP	6	—
Le disque d'or de Sheila – Volume 2	Released: 1970; Label: Carrere; Formats: LP	—	—
Super Hits	Released: 1973; Label: Philips; Formats: LP	—	—
Ne fais as tanguer le bateau	Released: 1975; Label: Carrere; Formats: 2×LP	147 (Note: Chart position is from 2006.)	—
L'arche de Noé	Released: May 1977; Label: Carrere; Formats: LP, MC	10	—
Disque d'or	Released: 1979; Label: Carrere; Formats: LP, MC; As Sheila and B. Devotion	141 (Note: Chart position is from 2019.)	—
Et ne la ramène pas – Disque d'or	Released: 1981; Label: Carrere; Formats: LP, MC	—	—
Les plus grands succès de Sheila	Released: 1989; Label: Carrere; Formats: CD, LP, MC	—	—
Les années yéyé vol. 1	Released: 28 April 1995; Label: EastWest; Formats: CD, MC	—	—
Les années disco vol. 2	Released: 28 April 1995; Label: EastWest; Formats: CD, MC	—	—
Les incontournables de Sheila	Released: January 1998; Label: EastWest; Formats: 2×CD, MC	—	—
Juste comme ça	Released: October 2006; Label: EastWest; Formats: CD, 2×CD, 3×CD	82	64
On sait pas s'aimer	Released: 14 May 2007; Label: WEA/Warner Music/Rhino; Formats: CD	148	—
The Disco Singles	Released: 8 June 2007; Label: WEA/Warner Music/Rhino; Formats: CD, 2×CD; As Sheila and B. Devotion	109	—
Rétrospective	Released: 21 October 2016; Label: Warner Music; Formats: 3×CD	26	93
Anthologie 1983/2012	Released: 19 May 2017; Label: Warner Music; Formats: CD	—	—
Pop – 60 ans	Released: 18 November 2022; Label: Warner Music; Formats: CD	—	131
Yéyé – 60 ans	Released: 18 November 2022; Label: Warner Music; Formats: CD	—	165
Love – 60 ans	Released: 18 November 2022; Label: Warner Music; Formats: CD	—	139
Disco – 60 ans	Released: 18 November 2022; Label: Warner Music; Formats: CD	—	163
Remixes – 60 ans	Released: January 2023; Label: Warner Music; Formats: CD	—	178
On the Rocks – 60 ans	Released: January 2023; Label: Warner Music; Formats: CD	—	185
From Paris to Los Angeles	Released: November 2023; Label: Warner Music; Formats: CD	50	47
"—" denotes releases that did not chart or were not released in that territory.

=== Box sets ===
Title	Album details	Peak chart positions
Title	Album details	FRA
13 + 3x2 – 28 chansons, 28 succès	Released: 1984; Label: Carrere; Formats: 2×LP, MC	—
1962–1992	Released: 1992; Label: Carrere; Formats: 4×CD, 2×CD, MC	—
Juste comme ça	Released: 30 October 2006; Label: WEA; Formats: 18×CD	—
L'integrale des singles de 1962 à 1969	Released: 31 March 2008; Label: WEA/Warner Music; Formats: 24×CD	—
L'integrale des singles de 1970 à 1980	Released: 30 June 2008; Label: Carrere; Formats: LP, MC	—
L'integrale des singles de 1980 à 2008	Released: 20 September 2008; Label: WEA/Warner Music/Rhino; Formats: 35×CD	—
Toutes ces vies	Released: 6 October 2008; Label: WEA/Rhino; Formats: 3×CD	—
5 albums originaux	Released: 5 August 2016; Label: Warner Music; Formats: 5×CD	—
Le coffret essentiel	Released: 14 October 2016; Label: Warner Music; Formats: 10×CD	170
Le coffret essentiel vol. 2 – Les années New Chance	Released: 27 October 2017; Label: Warner Music; Formats: 14×CD	—
"—" denotes releases that did not chart or were not released in that territory.

=== Video albums ===
Title	Album details
Je suis venue te dire que je m'en vais – Ses plus grands succès	Released: 1989; Label: PolyGram Music Video/Zoé Production/Marshe; Formats: CDV
Sheila à l'Olympia 98	Released: 1999; Label: Marshe; Formats: VHS
Sheila en concert à l'Olympia 2002 – Jamais deux sans toi	Released: 5 May 2003; Label: Sony Music; Formats: 2×CD
Rétrospective	Released: 21 October 2016; Label: Warner Music; Formats: 2xDVD
Vous les copains	Released: 2021; Label: RDM Édition; Formats: 2xDVD

== Singles and EPs ==
On the table below, until 1970, in France, Wallonia and Spain, the majority of Sheila's releases were EPs (represented in italics) of which many were also released as 7-inch promo jukebox singles. However, in some countries, where singles were more commonly released, the titles refer to the single release of the EP.

Title	Year	Peak chart positions									
Title	Year	FRA	AUS	BEL (FL)	BEL (WA)	GER	QUE	SPA	SWI	UK	US
Sheila (Note: The title track is a French-language version of the Tommy Roe song of the same name.)	1962	9	—	—	7	—	—	—	—	—	—
L'école est finie	1963	1	—	—	2	—	1	10	9	—	—
Pendant les vacances (Note: The title track is a French-language version of "All I Have to Do Is Dream", originally by the Everly Brothers.)	1963	1	—	—	3	—	—	—	—	—	—
Le sifflet des copains	1963	2	—	—	12	—	14	—	—	—	—
Hello petite fille (Note: Despite not being the first track on the EP (which is "Oui, c'est pour lui"), "Hello petite fille" was the most successful song and is a cover of the Beatles' "Hello Little Girl".)	1964	4	—	—	19	—	30	—	—	—	—
Chaque instant de change jour (Note: The title track is a French-language version of "Any Old Time of Day", originally by Dionne Warwick.)	1964	1	—	—	4	—	—	—	—	—	—
Écoute ce disque	1964	1	—	—	3	—	30	—	—	—	—
"Vous les copains" (Note: "Vous les copains" and "À la fin de la soirée" were both released as singles in Quebec, whereas in France they were included on the EP Écoute ce disque.)	1964	—	—	—	—	—	1	—	—	—	—
Toujours des beaux jours (Note: The title track is a French-language version of the Cliff Richard and the Shadows song "I Could Easily Fall (In Love with You)".)	1965	1	—	—	10	—	—	—	—	—	—
"À la fin de la soirée"	1965	—	—	—	—	—	1	—	—	—	—
C'est toi que j'aime	1965	1	—	—	13	—	—	—	—	—	—
Devant le juke box (with Akim) (Note: The title track is a French-language version of "If I Didn't Have a Dime (To Play the Jukebox)", originally by Gene Pitney.)	1965	1	—	—	8	—	2	—	—	—	—
Tous les deux	1965	1	—	—	1	—	—	—	—	—	—
"Le folklore américain" (Note: "Le folklore américain" was released as a single in several countries, whereas in France it was included on the EP Tous les deux.)	1965	—	—	8	—	—	26	—	—	—	—
Le cinéma	1966	1	—	5	1	—	7	—	15	—	—
"Prends la vie comme elle vient" (Note: "Prends la vie comme elle vient" was released as a single in Canada, whereas in France it was included on the EP Le cinéma. It is a French-language version of "Do What You Do Do Well" by Ned Miller.)	1966	—	—	—	—	—	29	—	—	—	—
Bang–bang (Note: The title track is a French-language version of "Bang Bang (My Baby Shot Me Down)" by Cher.)	1966	1	—	—	4	—	—	8	14	—	—
"Le pipeau" (Note: "Le pipeau" was released as a single in Canada, whereas in France it was included on the EP Bang–bang. It is a French-language version of "The Pied Piper" by the Changin' Times.)	1966	—	—	—	—	—	11	—	—	—	—
L'heure de la sortie	1966	1	—	—	5	—	48	—	—	—	—
La famille	1967	2	—	—	7	—	—	—	—	—	—
"Pamela" (Note: "Pamela" was released as a single in Canada, whereas in France it was included on the EP La famille. It is a French-language version of "Pamela, Pamela" by Wayne Fontana.)	1967	—	—	—	—	—	9	—	—	—	—
Adios amor	1967	1	—	16	2	—	22	—	—	—	—
Le kilt (Un sou c'est un sou...)	1967	1	—	—	4	—	—	—	—	—	—
Quand une fille aime un garçon	1968	1	—	—	6	—	—	—	—	—	—
"Dalila" (Note: "Dalila" was released as a single in Canada, whereas in France it was included on the EP Quand une fille aime un garçon. It is a French-language version of "Delilah" by Tom Jones.)	1968	—	—	—	—	—	29	—	—	—	—
Petite fille de français moyen	1968	1	—	—	5	—	—	—	—	—	—
Long sera l'hiver	1968	2	—	—	12	—	—	—	—	—	—
Arlequin	1969	4	—	—	12	—	—	—	—	—	—
Love, Maestro, Please	1969	10	—	—	21	—	—	—	—	—	—
Oncle Jo	1969	6	—	—	5	—	—	—	—	—	—
Julietta	1970	3	—	—	9	—	—	—	—	—	—
"Ma vie à t'aimer"	1970	11	—	—	27	—	—	—	—	—	—
"Reviens, je t'aime"	1970	2	—	—	6	—	30	—	—	—	—
"Les rois mages"	1971	1	—	2	1	—	—	—	—	—	—
"Blancs, jaunes, rouges, noirs"	1971	4	—	—	20	—	1	—	—	—	—
"Los reyes magos"	1971	—	—	—	—	—	—	16	—	—	—
"J'adore" (with Aldo Maccione)	1971	12	—	—	22	—	—	—	—	—	—
"Samson et Dalila"	1972	14	—	—	12	—	8	—	—	—	—
"Le mari de mama"	1972	6	—	—	6	—	—	—	—	—	—
"Poupée de porcelaine"	1972	3	—	—	6	—	—	—	—	—	—
"Les gondoles à Venise" (with Ringo)	1973	1	—	—	2	—	—	—	—	—	—
"Adam et Eve"	1973	4	—	—	9	—	—	—	—	—	—
"Mélancolie"	1973	3	—	—	2	—	—	—	—	—	—
"Le couple"	1974	5	—	—	15	—	—	—	—	—	—
"Tu es le soleil"	1974	2	—	—	3	—	34	—	—	—	—
"Ne fais pas tanguer le bateau"	1974	1	—	—	5	—	7	—	—	—	—
"C'est le cœur (Les ordres du docteur)"	1975	2	—	—	1	—	—	—	—	—	—
"Aimer avant de mourir"	1975	7	—	—	3	—	6	—	—	—	—
"Quel tempérament de feu"	1975	2	—	—	1	—	13	—	—	—	—
"Un prince en exil"	1976	3	—	—	1	—	—	—	—	—	—
"Personne d'autre que toi" (Canada-only release)	1976	—	—	—	—	—	9	—	—	—	—
"Patrick, mon chéri"	1976	3	—	—	3	—	17	—	—	—	—
"Les femmes"	1976	2	—	—	5	—	—	—	—	—	—
"L'amour qui brûle en moi"	1977	3	—	—	7	—	26	—	—	—	—
"L'arche de Noë"	1977	2	—	—	5	—	35	—	—	—	—
"Love Me Baby" (as Sheila B. Devotion)	1977	1	—	14	1	9	5	13	23	—	—
"Singin' in the Rain" (as Sheila B. Devotion)	1977	1	23	2	1	6	6	14	23	11	—
"I Don't Need a Doctor" / "Hôtel de la plage" (as Sheila B. Devotion)	1978	3	—	— 20	—	—	34	—	—	—	—
"You Light My Fire" (as Sheila B. Devotion)	1978	9	—	—	—	36	36	—	—	44	—
"Kennedy Airport"	1978	3	—	—	—	—	—	—	—	—	—
"Seven Lonely Days" (as Sheila B. Devotion)	1979	8	—	—	—	50	—	—	—	—	—
"No No No No" (as S.B. Devotion)	1979	28	—	—	—	—	—	—	—	—	—
"Spacer" (as Sheila and B. Devotion)	1979	3	95	14	—	9	—	—	18	18	—
"King of the World" (as Sheila and B. Devotion)	1980	11	—	—	—	—	—	—	—	—	—
"Your Love Is Good" (as Sheila and B. Devotion; US-only release)	1980	—	—	—	—	—	—	—	—	—	—
"Pilote sur les ondes"	1980	20	—	—	—	—	27	—	—	—	—
"Les sommets blancs de Wolfgang"	1981	42	—	—	—	—	—	—	—	—	—
"Et ne la ramène pas"	1981	4	—	—	—	—	—	—	—	—	—
"Une affaire d'amour"	1981	33	—	—	—	—	—	—	—	—	—
"Little Darlin'"	1981	35	—	—	—	—	—	—	—	—	49
"Runner"	1982	—	—	—	—	—	—	—	—	—	—
"La tendresse d'un homme"	1982	46	—	—	—	—	—	—	—	—	—
"Glori-Gloria"	1982	8	—	—	—	—	9	—	—	—	—
"Tangue au"	1983	29	—	—	—	—	—	—	—	—	—
"Vis va" (12"-only single)	1983	—	—	—	—	—	—	—	—	—	—
"Jeanie"	1983	63	—	—	—	—	—	—	—	—	—
"Plus de problème"	1984	—	—	—	—	—	—	—	—	—	—
"Film à l'envers"	1984	47	—	—	—	—	—	—	—	—	—
"Je suis comme toi"	1985	43	—	—	—	—	—	—	—	—	—
"Chanteur de funky"	1985	—	—	—	—	—	—	—	—	—	—
"Comme aujourd'hui"	1987	37	—	—	—	—	48	—	—	—	—
"C'est ma vie"	1987	—	—	—	—	—	—	—	—	—	—
"Fragile"	1988	—	—	—	—	—	—	—	—	—	—
"Partir"	1988	—	—	—	—	—	—	—	—	—	—
"Pour te retrouver"	1988	—	—	—	—	—	—	—	—	—	—
"Le tam tam du vent"	1989	45	—	—	—	—	—	—	—	—	—
"On s'dit plus rien"	1992	—	—	—	—	—	—	—	—	—	—
"Spacer" (Remix 1992; as Sheila B. Devotion)	1992	—	—	—	—	—	—	—	—	—	—
"Spacer" (Remix 1998)	1998	86	—	—	—	—	—	—	—	—	—
"Les rois mages 98"	1998	89	—	—	—	—	—	—	—	—	—
"Medley Disco"	1998	—	—	—	—	—	—	—	—	—	—
"Love Will Keep Us Together"	2000	—	—	—	—	—	—	—	—	—	—
"L'amour pour seule prière"	2006	—	—	—	—	—	—	—	—	—	—
"Pour sauver l'amour"	2012	126	—	—	—	—	—	—	—	—	—
"Loin d'ici"	2016	—	—	—	—	—	—	—	—	—	—
"Little Darlin'" (2018 New Remixes)	2018	—	—	—	—	—	—	—	—	—	—
"Septième continent"	2020	—	—	—	—	—	—	—	—	—	—
"—" denotes releases that did not chart or were not released in that territory.
