= List of number-one singles of 1963 (France) =

This is a list of the French Singles & Airplay Chart Reviews number-ones of 1963.

== Summary ==
=== Singles Chart ===
Week	Issue Date	Artist	Single
1	5 January	Johnny Hallyday	"L'idole des Jeunes"
2	12 January	Johnny Hallyday	"L'idole des Jeunes"
3	19 January	Johnny Hallyday	"L'idole des Jeunes"
4	26 January	Françoise Hardy	"Tous les garçons et les filles"
5	2 February	Françoise Hardy	"Tous les garçons et les filles"
6	9 February	The Tornados	"Telstar"
7	16 February	Françoise Hardy	"Tous les Garçons et les Filles"
8	23 February	Françoise Hardy	"Tous les Garçons et les Filles"
9	2 March	Françoise Hardy	"Tous les Garçons et les Filles"
10	9 March	Françoise Hardy	"Tous les Garçons et les Filles"
11	16 March	Françoise Hardy	"Tous les Garçons et les Filles"
12	23 March	Françoise Hardy	"Tous les Garçons et les Filles"
13	30 March	Françoise Hardy	"Tous les Garçons et les Filles"
14	6 April	Françoise Hardy	"Tous les Garçons et les Filles"
15	13 April	Françoise Hardy	"Tous les Garçons et les Filles"
16	20 April	Sheila	"L'école est finie"
17	27 April	Sheila	"L'école est finie"
18	4 May	Sheila	"L'école est finie"
19	11 May	Sheila	"L'école est finie"
20	18 May	Claude François	"Dis-Lui"
21	25 May	Claude François	"Dis-Lui"
22	1 June	Claude François	"Dis-Lui"
23	8 June	Claude François	"Dis-Lui"
24	15 June	Claude François	"Dis-Lui"
25	22 June	Sheila	"L'école est Finie"
26	29 June	Sheila	"L'école est Finie"
27	6 July	Enrico Macias	"Enfants de Tous Pays"
28	13 July	Johnny Hallyday	"Da Dou Ron Ron"
29	20 July	Claude François	"Pauvre Petite Fille Riche"
30	27 July	Claude François	"Pauvre Petite Fille Riche"
31	3 August	Claude François	"Pauvre Petite Fille Riche"
32	10 August	Claude François	"Pauvre Petite Fille Riche"
33	17 August	Sylvie Vartan	"Watching You"
34	24 August	Claude François	"Pauvre Petite Fille Riche"
35	31 August	Claude François	"Pauvre Petite Fille Riche"
36	7 September	Claude François	"Pauvre Petite Fille Riche"
37	14 September	Elvis Presley	"(You're the) Devil in Disguise"
38	21 September	Claude François	"Pauvre Petite Fille Riche"
39	28 September	Richard Anthony	"C'est ma Fête"
40	5 October	Richard Anthony	"C'est ma Fête"
41	12 October	Richard Anthony	"C'est ma Fête"
42	19 October	Johnny Hallyday	"Ma Guitarre"
43	26 October	Trini Lopez	"If I Had a Hammer"
44	2 November	Trini Lopez	"If I Had a Hammer"
45	9 November	Trini Lopez	"If I Had a Hammer"
46	16 November	Johnny Hallyday	"Pour Moi la Vie Va Commencer"
47	23 November	Johnny Hallyday	"Pour Moi la Vie Va Commencer"
48	30 November	Johnny Hallyday	"Pour Moi la Vie Va Commencer"
49	7 December	Johnny Hallyday	"Pour Moi la Vie Va Commencer"
50	14 December	Sylvie Vartan	"Si Je Chante"
51	21 December	Sylvie Vartan	"Si Je Chante"
52	28 December	Claude François	"Si J'avais un Marteau"

== See also ==
- 1963 in music
- List of number-one hits (France)
