= List of number-one singles of 1973 (France) =

This is a list of the French Singles & Airplay Chart Reviews number-ones of 1973.

== Summary ==
=== Singles Chart ===
| Week | Date | Artist | Single |
|---|---|---|---|
| 1 | 1 January | Mort Shuman | "Le lac majeur" |
| 2 | 8 January | Mort Shuman | "Le lac majeur" |
| 3 | 15 January | Mort Shuman | "Le lac majeur" |
| 4 | 22 January | Mort Shuman | "Le lac majeur" |
| 5 | 29 January | The Osmonds | "Crazy Horses" |
| 6 | 5 February | The Osmonds | "Crazy Horses" |
| 7 | 12 February | The Osmonds | "Crazy Horses" |
| 8 | 19 February | The Osmonds | "Crazy Horses" |
| 9 | 26 February | The Osmonds | "Crazy Horses" |
| 10 | 5 March | Sheila & Ringo | "Les gondoles à Venise" |
| 11 | 12 March | Sheila & Ringo | "Les gondoles à Venise" |
| 12 | 19 March | Sheila & Ringo | "Les gondoles à Venise" |
| 13 | 26 March | Sheila & Ringo | "Les gondoles à Venise" |
| 14 | 2 April | Mike Brant | "Rien qu'une larme" |
| 15 | 9 April | Mike Brant | "Rien qu'une larme" |
| 16 | 16 April | Mike Brant | "Rien qu'une larme" |
| 17 | 23 April | Mike Brant | "Rien qu'une larme" |
| 18 | 30 April | Frédéric François | "Un chant d'amour, un chant d'été" |
| 19 | 7 May | Crazy Horse | "Et surtout ne m'oublie pas" |
| 20 | 14 May | Crazy Horse | "Et surtout ne m'oublie pas" |
| 21 | 21 May | Crazy Horse | "Et surtout ne m'oublie pas" |
| 22 | 28 May | Crazy Horse | "Et surtout ne m'oublie pas" |
| 23 | 4 June | Michel Sardou | "La maladie d'amour" |
| 24 | 11 June | Michel Sardou | "La maladie d'amour" |
| 25 | 18 June | Michel Sardou | "La maladie d'amour" |
| 26 | 25 June | Michel Sardou | "La maladie d'amour" |
| 27 | 2 July | Johnny Hallyday & Sylvie Vartan | "J'ai un problème" |
| 28 | 9 July | Johnny Hallyday & Sylvie Vartan | "J'ai un problème" |
| 29 | 16 July | Johnny Hallyday & Sylvie Vartan | "J'ai un problème" |
| 30 | 23 July | Johnny Hallyday & Sylvie Vartan | "J'ai un problème" |
| 31 | 30 July | Michel Sardou | "La maladie d'amour" |
| 32 | 6 August | Johnny Hallyday & Sylvie Vartan | "J'ai un problème" |
| 33 | 13 August | Johnny Hallyday & Sylvie Vartan | "J'ai un problème" |
| 34 | 20 August | Michel Sardou | "La maladie d'amour" |
| 35 | 27 August | Johnny Hallyday & Sylvie Vartan | "J'ai un problème"' |
| 36 | 3 September | Mike Brant | "Tout donné, tout repris" |
| 37 | 10 September | Mike Brant | "Tout donné, tout repris" |
| 38 | 17 September | Mike Brant | "Tout donné, tout repris" |
| 39 | 24 September | Mike Brant | "Tout donné, tout repris" |
| 40 | 1 October | Mike Brant | "Tout donné, tout repris" |
| 41 | 8 October | Christian Vidal | "Angélique" |
| 42 | 15 October | Christian Vidal | "Angélique" |
| 43 | 22 October | Christian Vidal | "Angélique" |
| 44 | 29 October | Christian Vidal | "Angélique" |
| 45 | 5 November | Frédéric François | "Viens te perdre dans mes bras" |
| 46 | 12 November | The Rolling Stones | "Angie" |
| 47 | 19 November | Frédéric François | "Viens te perdre dans mes bras" |
| 48 | 26 November | Michel Sardou | "Les vieux mariés" |
| 49 | 3 December | Johnny Hallyday | "Noël interdit" |
| 50 | 10 December | Johnny Hallyday | "Noël interdit" |
| 51 | 17 December | Johnny Hallyday | "Noël interdit" |
| 52 | 24 December | Johnny Hallyday | "Noël interdit" |

== See also ==
- 1973 in music
- List of number-one hits (France)
