= List of number-one singles of 1977 (France) =

This is a list of the French Singles & Airplay Chart Reviews number-ones of 1977.

== Summary ==
=== Singles Chart ===
Week	Date	Artist	Single
1	7 January	Gérard Lenorman	"Voici les clés"
2	14 January	Gérard Lenorman	"Voici les clés"
3	21 January	Gérard Lenorman	"Voici les clés"
4	28 January	Gérard Lenorman	"Voici les clés"
5	4 February	Gérard Lenorman	"Voici les clés"
6	11 February	Gérard Lenorman	"Voici les clés"
7	18 February	Joe Dassin	"À toi"
8	25 February	Joe Dassin	"À toi"
9	4 March	Boney M.	"Sunny"
10	11 March	La Bande à Basile	"Les chansons françaises"
11	18 March	Jennifer	"Do It for Me"
12	25 March	Jennifer	"Do It for Me"
13	1 April	La Bande à Basile	"Les chansons françaises"
14	8 April	La Bande à Basile	"Les chansons françaises"
15	15 April	La Bande à Basile	"Les chansons françaises"
16	22 April	La Bande à Basile	"Les chansons françaises"
17	29 April	Boney M.	"Sunny"
18	6 May	La Bande à Basile	"Les chansons françaises"
19	13 May	Marie Myriam	"L'oiseau et l'enfant"
20	20 May	Marie Myriam	"L'oiseau et l'enfant"
21	27 May	Marie Myriam	"L'oiseau et l'enfant"
22	3 June	Marie Myriam	"L'oiseau et l'enfant"
23	10 June	Marie Myriam	"L'oiseau et l'enfant"
24	17 June	Laurent Voulzy	"Rockollection"
25	24 June	Laurent Voulzy	"Rockollection"
26	1 July	Laurent Voulzy	"Rockollection"
27	8 July	Laurent Voulzy	"Rockollection"
28	15 July	Laurent Voulzy	"Rockollection"
29	22 July	Laurent Voulzy	"Rockollection"
30	29 July	Laurent Voulzy	"Rockollection"
31	5 August	Sheila and Black Devotion	"Love Me Baby"
32	12 August	Sheila and Black Devotion	"Love Me Baby"
33	19 August	Sheila and Black Devotion	"Love Me Baby"
34	26 August	Sheila and Black Devotion	"Love Me Baby"
35	2 September	Boney M.	"Ma Baker"
36	9 September	Boney M.	"Ma Baker"
37	16 September	Boney M.	"Ma Baker"
38	23 September	Boney M.	"Ma Baker"
39	30 September	Mireille Mathieu	"Mille colombes"
40	7 October	Santa Esmeralda	"Don't Let Me Be Misunderstood"
41	14 October	Michel Sardou	"La Java de Broadway"
42	21 October	Michel Sardou	"La Java de Broadway"
43	28 October	Michel Sardou	"La Java de Broadway"
44	4 November	Michel Sardou	"La Java de Broadway"
45	11 November	Michel Sardou	"La Java de Broadway"
46	18 November	Sheila and Black Devotion	"Singin' in the Rain Part 1"
47	25 November	Sheila and Black Devotion	"Singin' in the Rain Part 1"
48	2 December	Sheila and Black Devotion	"Singin' in the Rain Part 1"
49	9 December	Adriano Celentano	"Don't Play That Song"
50	16 December	Jairo	"Es la Nostalgia"
51	23 December	Jairo	"Es la Nostalgia"
52	30 December	Michel Sardou	"La Java de Broadway"

== See also ==
- 1977 in music
- List of number-one hits (France)
