= List of number-one singles of 1975 (France) =

This is a list of the French Singles & Airplay Chart Reviews number-ones of 1975.

== Summary ==
=== Singles Chart ===
| Week | Date | Artist | Single |
|---|---|---|---|
| 1 | 4 January | Bimbo Jet | "El Bimbo" |
| 2 | 11 January | Bimbo Jet | "El Bimbo" |
| 3 | 18 January | Dave | "Vanina" |
| 4 | 25 January | Dave | "Vanina" |
| 5 | 1 February | Billy Swan | "I Can Help" |
| 6 | 8 February | Billy Swan | "I Can Help" |
| 7 | 15 February | Billy Swan | "I Can Help" |
| 8 | 22 February | Billy Swan | "I Can Help" |
| 9 | 1 March | Nino Ferrer | "Le sud" |
| 10 | 8 March | Nino Ferrer | "Le sud" |
| 11 | 15 March | Nino Ferrer | "Le sud" |
| 12 | 22 March | Nino Ferrer | "Le sud" |
| 13 | 29 March | Nino Ferrer | "Le sud" |
| 14 | 5 April | Alain Barrière & Noëlle Cordier | "Tu t'en vas" |
| 15 | 12 April | Alain Barrière & Noëlle Cordier | "Tu t'en vas" |
| 16 | 19 April | Alain Barrière & Noëlle Cordier | "Tu t'en vas" |
| 17 | 26 April | Alain Barrière & Noëlle Cordier | "Tu t'en vas" |
| 18 | 3 May | Alain Barrière & Noëlle Cordier | "Tu t'en vas" |
| 19 | 10 May | Alain Barrière & Noëlle Cordier | "Tu t'en vas" |
| 20 | 17 May | Alain Barrière & Noëlle Cordier | "Tu t'en vas" |
| 21 | 24 May | Alain Barrière & Noëlle Cordier | "Tu t'en vas" |
| 22 | 31 May | Alain Barrière & Noëlle Cordier | "Tu t'en vas" |
| 23 | 7 June | Alain Barrière & Noëlle Cordier | "Tu t'en vas" |
| 24 | 14 June | Joe Dassin | "L'été indien" |
| 25 | 21 June | Joe Dassin | "L'été indien" |
| 26 | 28 June | Michel Sardou | "Un accident" |
| 27 | 5 July | Michel Sardou | "Un accident" |
| 28 | 12 July | Michel Sardou | "Un accident" |
| 29 | 19 July | Joe Dassin | "L'été indien" |
| 30 | 26 July | Joe Dassin | "L'été indien" |
| 31 | 2 August | Martin Circus | "Marylène - Loin d’ici" |
| 32 | 9 August | Martin Circus | "Marylène - Loin d’ici" |
| 33 | 16 August | Joe Dassin | "L'été indien" |
| 34 | 23 August | Joe Dassin | "L'été indien" |
| 35 | 30 August | Joe Dassin | "L'été indien" |
| 36 | 6 September | Saint Preux | "Your Hair" |
| 37 | 13 September | Saint Preux | "Your Hair" |
| 38 | 20 September | The Rubettes | "Foe-Dee-O-Dee" |
| 39 | 27 September | Jean-Claude Borelly | "Dolannes Mélodie" |
| 40 | 4 October | Jean-Claude Borelly | "Dolannes Mélodie" |
| 41 | 11 October | Jean-Claude Borelly | "Dolannes Mélodie" |
| 42 | 18 October | Jean-Claude Borelly | "Dolannes Mélodie" |
| 43 | 25 October | Jean-Claude Borelly | "Dolannes Mélodie" |
| 44 | 1 November | Jean-Claude Borelly | "Dolannes Mélodie" |
| 45 | 8 November | Michel Sardou | "Le France" |
| 46 | 15 November | Michel Sardou | "Le France" |
| 47 | 22 November | Michel Sardou | "Le France" |
| 48 | 29 November | Michel Sardou | "Le France" |
| 49 | 6 December | Michel Sardou | "Le France" |
| 50 | 13 December | Daniel Guichard | "Je t'aime, tu vois..." |
| 51 | 20 December | Daniel Guichard | "Je t'aime, tu vois..." |
| 52 | 27 December | Daniel Guichard | "Je t'aime, tu vois..." |

== See also ==
- 1975 in music
- List of number-one hits (France)
