= List of number-one singles of 1965 (France) =

This is a list of the French Singles & Airplay Chart Reviews number-ones of 1965.

== Summary ==
=== Singles Chart ===
Week	Issue Date	Artist	Title
1	2 January	France Gall	"Sacré Charlemagne"
2	9 January	Salvatore Adamo	"Vous permettez, Monsieur?"
3	16 January	France Gall	"Sacré Charlemagne"
4	23 January	France Gall	"Sacré Charlemagne"
5	30 January	France Gall	"Sacré Charlemagne"
6	6 February	France Gall	"Sacré Charlemagne"
7	13 February	France Gall	"Sacré Charlemagne"
8	20 February	France Gall	"Sacré Charlemagne"
9	27 February	Enrico Macias	"Les Filles de mon Pays"
10	6 March	Enrico Macias	"Les Filles de mon Pays"
11	13 March	Enrico Macias	"Les Filles de mon Pays"
12	20 March	Enrico Macias	"Les Filles de mon Pays"
13	27 March	Sheila	"Toujours des Beaux Jours"
14	3 April	Claude François	"Les Choses de la Maison"
15	10 April	Salvatore Adamo	"La Nuit"
16	17 April	Salvatore Adamo	"La Nuit"
17	24 April	Salvatore Adamo	"La Nuit"
18	1 May	Salvatore Adamo	"La Nuit"
19	8 May	Salvatore Adamo	"La Nuit"
20	15 May	Salvatore Adamo	"La Nuit"
21	22 May	Salvatore Adamo	"La Nuit"
22	29 May	Salvatore Adamo	"La Nuit"
23	5 June	Salvatore Adamo	"La Nuit"
24	12 June	Salvatore Adamo	"La Nuit"
25	19 June	Salvatore Adamo	"La Nuit"
26	26 June	Mikis Theodorakis	"La Danse de Zorba"
27	3 July	Mikis Theodorakis	"La Danse de Zorba"
28	10 July	Mikis Theodorakis	"La Danse de Zorba"
29	17 July	Mikis Theodorakis	"La Danse de Zorba"
30	24 July	Mikis Theodorakis	"La Danse de Zorba"
31	31 July	Mikis Theodorakis	"La Danse de Zorba"
32	7 August	Sheila	"C'est Toi Que J'aime"
33	14 August	Salvatore Adamo	"Mes Mains Sur Tes Hanches"
34	21 August	Salvatore Adamo	"Mes Mains Sur Tes Hanches"
35	28 August	Salvatore Adamo	"Mes Mains Sur Tes Hanches"
36	4 September	Salvatore Adamo	"Mes Mains Sur Tes Hanches"
37	11 September	Christophe	"Aline"
38	18 September	Christophe	"Aline"
39	25 September	Salvatore Adamo	"Mes Mains Sur Tes Hanches"
40	2 October	Salvatore Adamo	"Mes Mains Sur Tes Hanches"
41	9 October	Salvatore Adamo	"Mes Mains Sur Tes Hanches"
42	16 October	Salvatore Adamo	"Mes Mains Sur Tes Hanches"
43	23 October	Salvatore Adamo	"Mes Mains Sur Tes Hanches"
44	30 October	Salvatore Adamo	"Mes Mains Sur Tes Hanches"
45	6 November	Salvatore Adamo	"Mes Mains Sur Tes Hanches"
46	13 November	Sheila	"Le Folklore Américain"
48	20 November	Claude François	"Même Si Tu Revenais"
47	27 November	Claude François	"Même Si Tu Revenais"
49	4 December	Claude François	"Même Si Tu Revenais"
50	11 December	Enrico Macias	"Mon Cœur d'attache"
51	18 December	Enrico Macias	"Mon Cœur d'attache"
52	25 December	Enrico Macias	"Mon Cœur d'attache"

== See also ==
- 1965 in music
- List of number-one hits (France)
