= List of number-one singles of 1974 (France) =

This is a list of the French Singles & Airplay Chart Reviews number-ones of 1974.

== Summary ==
=== Singles Chart ===
Week	Date	Artist	Single
1	1 January	Michel Delpech	"Les divorcés"
2	8 January	Michel Delpech	"Les divorcés"
3	15 January	Michel Delpech	"Les divorcés"
4	22 January	Michel Delpech	"Les divorcés"
5	29 January	Michel Delpech	"Les divorcés"
6	5 February	Tweety & Sylvester	"Titi à la neige"
7	12 February	Tweety & Sylvester	"Titi à la neige"
8	19 February	Tweety & Sylvester	"Titi à la neige"
9	26 February	Tweety & Sylvester	"Titi à la neige"
10	5 March	Tweety & Sylvester	"Titi à la neige"
11	12 March	Tweety & Sylvester	"Titi à la neige"
12	19 March	Tweety & Sylvester	"Titi à la neige"
13	26 March	Tweety & Sylvester	"Titi à la neige"
14	2 April	Gérard Lenorman	"Quelque chose et moi"
15	9 April	Gérard Lenorman	"Quelque chose et moi"
16	16 April	Gérard Lenorman	"Quelque chose et moi"
17	23 April	Gérard Lenorman	"Quelque chose et moi"
18	30 April	ABBA	"Waterloo"
19	7 May	ABBA	"Waterloo"
20	14 May	ABBA	"Waterloo"
21	21 May	ABBA	"Waterloo"
22	28 May	ABBA	"Waterloo"
23	4 June	Patrick Green & Olivier Lejeune	"Pot pour rire Mr le Président"
24	11 June	Patrick Green & Olivier Lejeune	"Pot pour rire Mr le Président"
25	18 June	Patrick Green & Olivier Lejeune	"Pot pour rire Mr le Président"
26	25 June	Patrick Green & Olivier Lejeune	"Pot pour rire Mr le Président"
27	2 July	Patrick Green & Olivier Lejeune	"Pot pour rire Mr le Président"
28	9 July	Patrick Green & Olivier Lejeune	"Pot pour rire Mr le Président"
29	16 July	Patrick Green & Olivier Lejeune	"Pot pour rire Mr le Président"
30	23 July	Patrick Green & Olivier Lejeune	"Pot pour rire Mr le Président"
31	30 July	Patrick Green & Olivier Lejeune	"Pot pour rire Mr le Président"
32	6 August	Patrick Green & Olivier Lejeune	"Pot pour rire Mr le Président"
33	13 August	Patrick Green & Olivier Lejeune	"Pot pour rire Mr le Président"
34	20 August	Patrick Green & Olivier Lejeune	"Pot pour rire Mr le Président"
35	27 August	Patrick Green & Olivier Lejeune	"Pot pour rire Mr le Président"
36	3 September	Waldo de los Ríos	"Nabucco"
37	10 September	Waldo de los Ríos	"Nabucco"
38	17 September	Waldo de los Ríos	"Nabucco"
39	24 September	Waldo de los Ríos	"Nabucco"
40	1 October	Claude François	"Le téléphone pleure"
41	8 October	Claude François	"Le téléphone pleure"
42	15 October	Claude François	"Le téléphone pleure"
43	22 October	Claude François	"Le téléphone pleure"
44	29 October	Claude François	"Le téléphone pleure"
45	5 November	Claude François	"Le téléphone pleure"
46	12 November	Carl Douglas	"Kung Fu Fighting"
47	19 November	Sheila	"Ne fais pas tanguer le bateau"
48	26 November	Sheila	"Ne fais pas tanguer le bateau"
49	3 December	Claude François	"Le téléphone pleure"
50	10 December	Claude François	"Le téléphone pleure"
51	17 December	Claude François	"Le téléphone pleure"
52	24 December	Claude François	"Le téléphone pleure"

== See also ==
- 1974 in music
- List of number-one hits (France)
