= List of number-one singles of 1968 (France) =

This is a list of the French Singles & Airplay Chart Reviews number-ones of 1968.

== Summary ==
=== Singles Chart ===
Week	Issue date	Artist	Single
1	6 January	Mireille Mathieu	La Dernière Valse
2	13 January	Mireille Mathieu	La Dernière Valse
3	20 January	Mireille Mathieu	La Dernière Valse
4	27 January	Mireille Mathieu	La Dernière Valse
5	3 February	Mireille Mathieu	La Dernière Valse
6	10 February	Mireille Mathieu	La Dernière Valse
7	17 February	David McWilliams	Days of Pearly Spencer
8	24 February	David McWilliams	Days of Pearly Spencer
9	2 March	David McWilliams	Days of Pearly Spencer
10	9 March	David McWilliams	Days of Pearly Spencer
11	16 March	The Moody Blues	Nights in White Satin
12	23 March	The Moody Blues	Nights in White Satin
13	30 March	Georgette Plana	Riquita
14	6 April	Georgette Plana	Riquita
15	13 April	Georgette Plana	Riquita
16	20 April	The Moody Blues	Nights in White Satin
17	27 April	Georgette Plana	Riquita
18	4 May	Georgette Plana	Riquita
19	11 May	Tom Jones	Delilah
20	18 May	Tom Jones	Delilah
21	25 May	Tom Jones	Delilah
22	1 June	Tom Jones	Delilah
23	8 June	Tom Jones	Delilah
24	15 June	Tom Jones	Delilah
25	22 June	Engelbert Humperdinck	A man without love
26	29 June	Engelbert Humperdinck	A man without love
27	6 July	Engelbert Humperdinck	A man without love
28	13 July	Sheila	Petite fille de français moyen
29	20 July	Sheila	Petite fille de français moyen
30	27 July	Aphrodite's Child	Rain and Tears
31	3 August	Aphrodite's Child	Rain and Tears
32	10 August	Aphrodite's Child	Rain and Tears
33	17 August	Aphrodite's Child	Rain and Tears
34	24 August	Aphrodite's Child	Rain and Tears
35	31 August	Aphrodite's Child	Rain and Tears
36	7 September	Aphrodite's Child	Rain and Tears
37	14 September	Aphrodite's Child	Rain and Tears
38	21 September	Aphrodite's Child	Rain and Tears
39	28 September	Peter Holm	Monia
40	5 October	Peter Holm	Monia
41	12 October	Peter Holm	Monia
42	19 October	Peter Holm	Monia
43	26 October	Peter Holm	Monia
44	4 November	Peter Holm	Monia
45	9 November	Peter Holm	Monia
46	16 November	Peter Holm	Monia
47	23 November	Peter Holm	Monia
48	30 November	Dalida	Le temps des Fleurs
49	7 December	Dalida	Le temps des Fleurs
50	14 December	Joe Dassin	Ma bonne étoile
51	21 December	Joe Dassin	Ma bonne étoile
52	28 December	Joe Dassin	Ma bonne étoile

== See also ==
- 1968 in music
- List of number-one hits (France)
