= List of number-one singles of 1983 (France) =

This is a list of the French Singles & Airplay Chart Reviews number-ones of 1983.

== Summary ==
=== Singles Chart ===
Week	Date	Artist	Single
1	8 January	Dorothée	"Hou! La menteuse"
2	15 January	Dorothée	"Hou! La menteuse"
3	22 January	Dorothée	"Hou! La menteuse"
4	29 January	Dorothée	"Hou! La menteuse"
5	5 February	Rose Laurens	"Africa"
6	12 February	Rose Laurens	"Africa"
7	19 February	Rose Laurens	"Africa"
8	26 February	Rose Laurens	"Africa"
9	5 March	Rose Laurens	"Africa"
10	12 March	Rose Laurens	"Africa"
11	19 March	Rose Laurens	"Africa"
12	26 March	Rose Laurens	"Africa"
13	2 April	Les Forbans	"Chante"
14	9 April	Les Forbans	"Chante"
15	16 April	Les Forbans	"Chante"
16	23 April	Culture Club	"Do You Really Want to Hurt Me"
17	30 April	Culture Club	"Do You Really Want to Hurt Me"
18	7 May	Michael Jackson	"Billie Jean"
19	14 May	Michael Jackson	"Billie Jean"
20	21 May	Michael Jackson	"Billie Jean"
21	28 May	Michael Jackson	"Billie Jean"
22	4 June	Toto Cutugno	"L'Italiano"
23	11 June	Toto Cutugno	"L'Italiano"
24	18 June	Toto Cutugno	"L'Italiano"
25	25 June	Toto Cutugno	"L'Italiano"
26	2 July	Toto Cutugno	"L'Italiano"
27	9 July	Toto Cutugno	"L'Italiano"
28	16 July	Toto Cutugno	"L'Italiano"
29	23 July	Toto Cutugno	"L'Italiano"
30	30 July	Toto Cutugno	"L'Italiano"
31	6 August	Toto Cutugno	"L'Italiano"
32	13 August	Toto Cutugno	"L'Italiano"
33	20 August	Toto Cutugno	"L'Italiano"
34	27 August	Toto Cutugno	"L'Italiano"
35	3 September	Eurythmics	"Sweet Dreams (Are Made of This)"
36	10 September	Eurythmics	"Sweet Dreams (Are Made of This)"
37	17 September	Eurythmics	"Sweet Dreams (Are Made of This)"
38	24 September	Eurythmics	"Sweet Dreams (Are Made of This)"
39	1 October	Irene Cara	"Flashdance... What a Feeling"
40	8 October	Irene Cara	"Flashdance... What a Feeling"
41	15 October	Irene Cara	"Flashdance... What a Feeling"
42	22 October	Irene Cara	"Flashdance... What a Feeling"
43	29 October	Irene Cara	"Flashdance... What a Feeling"
44	5 November	Irene Cara	"Flashdance... What a Feeling"
45	12 November	Irene Cara	"Flashdance... What a Feeling"
46	19 November	Irene Cara	"Flashdance... What a Feeling"
47	26 November	Irene Cara	"Flashdance... What a Feeling"
48	3 December	Irene Cara	"Flashdance... What a Feeling"
49	10 December	Irene Cara	"Flashdance... What a Feeling"
50	17 December	Claude Barzotti	"Le Rital"
51	24 December	Irene Cara	"Flashdance... What a Feeling"
52	31 December	Renaud	"Dès que le vent soufflera"

== See also ==
- 1983 in music
- List of number-one hits (France)
