= Alain Barrière =

French singer (1935–2019)

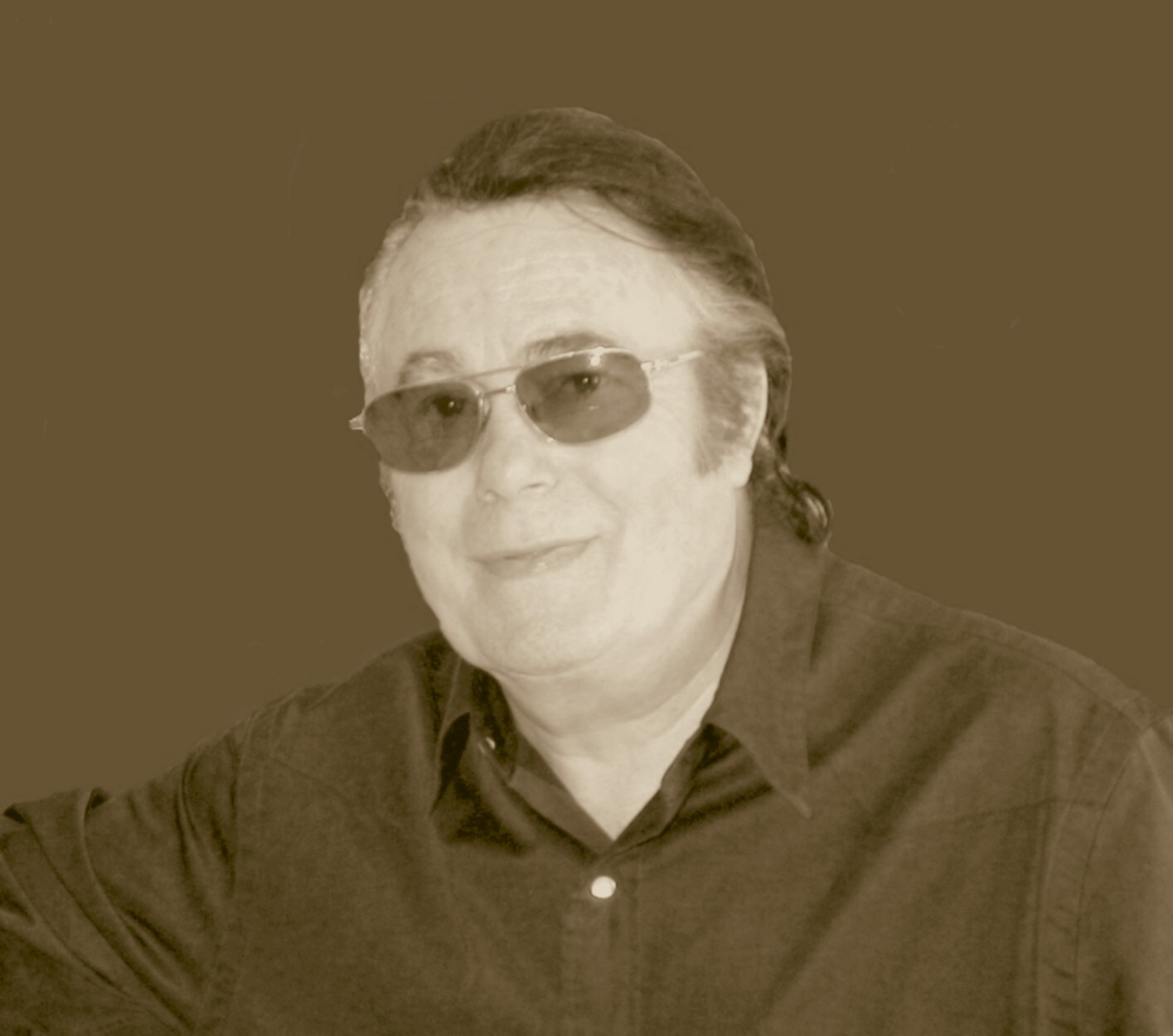

Background information
- Born: Alain Bellec; 18 November 1935; La Trinité-sur-Mer, Brittany, France
- Died: 18 December 2019 (aged 84) Carnac, Morbihan, France
- Genres: Pop, Chanson
- Occupation: Singer
- Labels: RCA, Barclay

Alain Barrière (French pronunciation: [alɛ̃ baʁjɛʁ]; born Alain Bellec; 18 November 1935 – 18 December 2019) was a French singer, who was active from the 1950s until his death and was known for participating in the Eurovision Song Contest 1963.

== Early life ==
After growing up in a small town on the coast of Brittany, in 1955 Barrière enrolled in the École nationale supérieure d'arts et métiers in Angers. As a student he bought a guitar and started to write songs. After graduating in engineering in 1960, he moved to Paris to take up employment, and started to perform in the evenings at small clubs around the capital. He won a song contest in 1961 with the self-penned song "Cathy"; his style was chanson-based with no concession to the burgeoning yé-yé scene, but nonetheless he was soon signed to a recording contract and started to release singles regularly, enabling him to give up his job and make at least a modest living from music.

== Eurovision Song Contest ==
In 1963, Barrière's song "Elle était si jolie" ("She Was So Pretty") was chosen as the French representative in the eighth Eurovision Song Contest which took place on 23 March in London. "Elle était si jolie" finished fifth of 16 entries.

== Success ==
"Elle était si jolie" turned out to be by far the biggest seller of Barrière's career to that point. He released his first album, Ma vie, in 1964 and the title-track became a hit. In 1965 he was offered, and accepted, a leading role in a heist thriller, Pas de panique, alongside Pierre Brasseur. This would be his only venture into acting, but his singing career reached its peak in the latter part of the decade with a string of hits making him one of France's biggest stars and a sell-out live attraction.

== 1970s ==
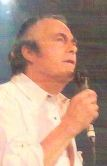
Alain Barrière

Barrière had gained a reputation for being uncompromising and at times difficult to work with. In the early 1970s he left his record company to set up his own label. He kept his fanbase, which ensured his records and concerts continued to provide a good living, despite his being overlooked by sections of the French broadcast media. "Tu t'en vas", a 1975 duet with fellow Eurovision veteran Noëlle Cordier, topped the French chart, and was the third biggest-selling single of the year in Switzerland.

Barrière had a role in composing the song "Du gehst fort" with Eckart Hachfeld. Artists Marion & Antony worked with producer Fritz Muschler and the song, backed with "Ein Mädchen in Athen" was released on Ariola 16 222 AT in 1975. It became a hit for the duo, making it to no. 15 on the German charts and it stayed in the charts for thirteen weeks.

Barrière married in 1975, and he and his wife opened a nightclub-restaurant in a converted castle in Brittany. Although it proved a successful and popular venue, Barrière soon found himself facing severe tax problems as a result of dubious advice. In 1977 he took his family to the United States, where they remained for four years.

== Later life ==
After returning to France, Barrière made several comeback attempts, to little avail. After another period spent overseas, this time in Quebec, the family were back in Brittany when Barrière's career was unexpectedly rejuvenated by the 1997 release of a CD containing remastered versions of his old hits, which proved to be a money-spinner. Shortly afterwards, Barrière released an album of new material, which also sold well.

He published an autobiography in 2006 and continued to release both retrospective and newly recorded albums.

Barrière died of cardiac arrest on 18 December 2019 at the age of 84.

== Discography ==
=== Singles ===
- 1963: "Elle était si jolie"
- 1963: "Plus je t'entends"
- 1964: "Ma vie"
- 1968: "Emporte-moi"
- 1968: "Tout peut recommencer"
- 1969: "C'était aux premiers jours d'avril"
- 1969: "Viva ouagadougou"
- 1970: "À regarder la mer"
- 1971: "Si tu ne me revenais pas"
- 1971: "La Mer"
- 1972: "Elle"
- 1973: "Pour la dernière fois"
- 1974: "Le Bel amour"
- 1974: "Séduction 13"
- 1975: "Tu t'en vas" (with Noëlle Cordier)
- 1975: "Celtina"
- 1975: "Mon improbable amour"
- 1976: "Si tu te souviens"
- 1978: "Et tu fermes les yeux"
- 1978: "Amoco

Preceded by Isabelle Aubret with Un premier amour	France in the Eurovision Song Contest; 1963	Succeeded by Rachel with Le Chant de Mallory
