= List of number-one singles of 1957 (France) =

This is a list of the French singles & airplay chart reviews number-ones of 1957.

== Number-ones by week ==
=== Singles chart ===
Week	Issue date	Artist(s)	Song	Ref.
1	4 January	Darío Moreno	"Je vais revoir ma blonde"	
2	11 January	Doris Day	"Whatever Will Be, Will Be (Que Será, Será)"	
3	18 January	Doris Day	"Whatever Will Be, Will Be (Que Será, Será)"	
4	25 January	Doris Day	"Whatever Will Be, Will Be (Que Será, Será)"	
5	1 February	Doris Day	"Whatever Will Be, Will Be (Que Será, Será)"	
6	8 February	Doris Day	"Whatever Will Be, Will Be (Que Será, Será)"	
7	15 February	Doris Day	"Whatever Will Be, Will Be (Que Será, Será)"	
8	22 February	Doris Day	"Whatever Will Be, Will Be (Que Será, Será)"	
9	1 March	Doris Day	"Whatever Will Be, Will Be (Que Será, Será)"	
10	8 March	Doris Day	"Whatever Will Be, Will Be (Que Será, Será)"	
11	15 March	Doris Day	"Whatever Will Be, Will Be (Que Será, Será)"	
12	22 March	Doris Day	"Whatever Will Be, Will Be (Que Será, Será)"	
13	29 March	Doris Day	"Whatever Will Be, Will Be (Que Será, Será)"	
14	5 April	Dalida	"Bambino"	
15	12 April	Dalida	"Bambino"	
16	19 April	Dalida	"Bambino"	
17	26 April	Dalida	"Bambino"	
18	3 May	Dalida	"Bambino"	
19	10 May	Dalida	"Bambino"	
20	17 May	Dalida	"Bambino"	
21	24 May	Dalida	"Bambino"	
22	31 May	Dalida	"Bambino"	
23	7 June	Dalida	"Bambino"	
24	14 June	Dalida	"Bambino"	
25	21 June	Dalida	"Bambino"	
26	28 June	Dalida	"Bambino"	
27	5 July	Dalida	"Bambino"	
28	12 July	Dalida	"Bambino"	
29	19 July	Dalida	"Bambino"	
30	26 July	Dalida	"Bambino"	
31	2 August	Dalida	"Bambino"	
32	9 August	Dalida	"Bambino"	
33	16 August	Dalida	"Bambino"	
34	23 August	Dalida	"Bambino"	
35	30 August	Dalida	"Bambino"	
36	6 September	Dalida	"Bambino"	
37	13 September	Dalida	"Bambino"	
38	20 September	Dalida	"Bambino"	
39	27 September	Dalida	"Bambino"	
40	4 October	Dalida	"Bambino"	
41	11 October	Dalida	"Bambino"	
42	18 October	Dalida	"Bambino"	
43	25 October	Dalida	"Bambino"	
44	1 November	Dalida	"Bambino"	
45	8 November	Dalida	"Tu n'as pas très bon caractère"	
46	15 November	The Platters	"Only You (And You Alone)"	
47	22 November	The Platters	"Only You (And You Alone)"	
48	29 November	The Platters	"Only You (And You Alone)"	
49	6 December	The Platters	"Only You (And You Alone)"	
50	13 December	The Platters	"Only You (And You Alone)"	
51	20 December	The Platters	"Only You (And You Alone)"	
52	27 December	The Platters	"Only You (And You Alone)"	

== See also ==
- 1957 in music
- List of number-one hits (France)
