= Viens boire un p'tit coup à la maison =

Single by Licence IV
- B-side: "Instrumental"
- Released: March 1987
- Recorded: France, 1986
- Genre: Pop
- Length: 3:27
- Label: Charles Talar
- Songwriter(s): Olivier Guillot; Jean-Jacques Lafon; Francis Vacher
- Producer(s): Alain Mouyseet

"Viens boire un p'tit coup à la maison" (Come home for a little drink) is a 1987 song recorded by the French band Licence IV. Released as a single in March 1987, the song achieved a huge success in France, becoming one of the best-selling singles of the 1980s in France. The band did not release another song, nor any album.

== Music and lyrics ==
This drinking song was composed by Jean-Jacques Lafon under the pseudonym of J.Falon. This French singer has had a smash hit in 1986 with "Le Géant de papier". Very popular, the song deals with the tasting of the wine and the sausage, in company with some friends, in a festive atmosphere. Licence IV was a male duet composed of Olivier Guillot and Francis Vacher, who were respectively the secretary and the artistic director of Patrick Sébastien. Gillou - Pierre Perret's accordionist -, who is mentioned in the lyrics, also participated in the composition of the song.

== Chart performance ==
In France, "Viens boire un p'tit coup à la maison" debuted at number 27 on 10 October 1987, reached the top ten two weeks later and became number one in its sixth week, staying atop for consecutive 13 weeks, which was at the time the record of the most weeks at the top for a single (this record was also carried out the previous year by the band Images with their hit "Les Démons de minuit"). The single totaled 23 weeks in the top ten and 32 weeks in the top 50, and was certified Platinum disc by the Syndicat National de l'Édition Phonographique. On the combined Music & Media's Pan-European Hot 100 Singles, the song debuted at number 76 on 28 March 1987, reached a peak of number 34 in its 11th week, and fell off the chart after a 28 weeks of presence.

== Cover versions ==
A parody named Viens fumer un p'tit joint à la maison was released in 2003 by Bruno Blum. The song was covered by Les Enfoirés on their album 2011: Dans l'œil des Enfoirés, and included in the medley "Troisième Sexe". The song was performed by Lorie, Alizée, Claire Keim, Nolwenn Leroy, Amel Bent, Mimie Mathy, Jenifer Bartoli, Tina Arena, Patricia Kaas, Pascal Obispo, Jean-Louis Aubert, Grégoire, Kad Merad, Patrick Bruel, MC Solaar, Christophe Maé, Jean-Jacques Goldman and Sébastien Loeb.

== Track listings ==
7" single

1. "Viens boire un p'tit coup à la maison" — 3:27
2. "Viens boire un p'tit coup à la maison" (instrumental) — 4:12

== Charts ==
=== Weekly charts ===
Weekly chart performance for "Viens boire un p'tit coup à la maison"
Chart (1987)	Peak position
Europe (European Hot 100)	34
France (SNEP)	1

=== Year-end charts ===
1987 year-end chart performance for "Viens boire un p'tit coup à la maison"
Chart (1987)	Position
Europe (European Hot 100)	35
France (SNEP)	1

=== Certifications ===
Certifications for "Viens boire un p'tit coup à la maison"
Region	Certification	Certified units/sales
France (SNEP)	Platinum	1,000,000^{*}
^{*} Sales figures based on certification alone.

== See also ==
- List of number-one singles of 1987 (France)
