= List of number-one singles of 1981 (France) =

This is a list of the French Singles & Airplay Chart Reviews number-ones of 1981.

== Summary ==
=== Singles chart ===
Week	Date	Artist	Single
1	2 January	Barbra Streisand	"Woman in Love"
2	9 January	Barbra Streisand	"Woman in Love"
3	16 January	Eddy Mitchell	"Couleur menthe a l'eau"
4	23 January	Eddy Mitchell	"Couleur menthe a l'eau"
5	30 January	Richard Sanderson	"Reality"
6	6 February	Richard Sanderson	"Reality"
7	13 February	Richard Sanderson	"Reality"
8	20 February	Richard Sanderson	"Reality"
9	27 February	Richard Sanderson	"Reality"
10	6 March	Richard Sanderson	"Reality"
11	13 March	Richard Sanderson	"Reality"
12	20 March	Richard Sanderson	"Reality"
13	27 March	Jona Lewie	"Stop the Cavalry"
14	3 April	Jona Lewie	"Stop the Cavalry"
15	10 April	Jona Lewie	"Stop the Cavalry"
16	17 April	Alain Bashung	"Vertige de l'amour"
17	24 April	Jona Lewie	"Stop the Cavalry"
18	1 May	Jona Lewie	"Stop the Cavalry"
19	8 May	Jona Lewie	"Stop the Cavalry"
20	15 May	Phil Collins	"In the Air Tonight"
21	22 May	Phil Collins	"In the Air Tonight"
22	29 May	Herbert Léonard	"Pour le plaisir"
23	5 June	Herbert Léonard	"Pour le plaisir"
24	12 June	Herbert Léonard	"Pour le plaisir"
25	19 June	Herbert Léonard	"Pour le plaisir"
26	26 June	Herbert Léonard	"Pour le plaisir"
27	3 July	Herbert Léonard	"Pour le plaisir"
28	10 July	Elton John	"Je Veux De La Tendresse"
29	17 July	Elton John	"Je Veux De La Tendresse"
30	24 July	Kim Carnes	"Bette Davis Eyes"
31	31 July	Kim Carnes	"Bette Davis Eyes"
32	7 August	Kim Carnes	"Bette Davis Eyes"
33	14 August	Kim Carnes	"Bette Davis Eyes"
34	21 August	Kim Carnes	"Bette Davis Eyes"
35	28 August	Kim Carnes	"Bette Davis Eyes"
36	4 September	Kim Carnes	"Bette Davis Eyes"
37	11 September	Kim Carnes	"Bette Davis Eyes"
38	18 September	Kim Carnes	"Bette Davis Eyes"
39	25 September	Kim Carnes	"Bette Davis Eyes"
40	2 October	Jean Schultheis	"Confidence Pour Confidence"
41	9 October	Jean Schultheis	"Confidence Pour Confidence"
42	16 October	Jean Schultheis	"Confidence Pour Confidence"
43	23 October	Kim Carnes	"Bette Davis Eyes"
44	30 October	J.J. Lionel	"La danse des canards"
45	6 November	Michel Berger	"Mademoiselle Chang"
46	13 November	Michel Berger	"Mademoiselle Chang"
47	20 November	Jean Schultheis	"Confidence Pour Confidence"
48	27 November	Ennio Morricone	"Chi Mai"
49	4 December	Ennio Morricone	"Chi Mai"
50	11 December	Ennio Morricone	"Chi Mai"
51	18 December	Oscar Benton	"Bensonhurst Blues"
52	25 December	Nana Mouskouri	"Je chante avec toi, liberté"

== See also ==
- 1981 in music
- List of number-one hits (France)
