= Jean-Jacques Lafon =

French singer-songwriter and painter (born 1955)

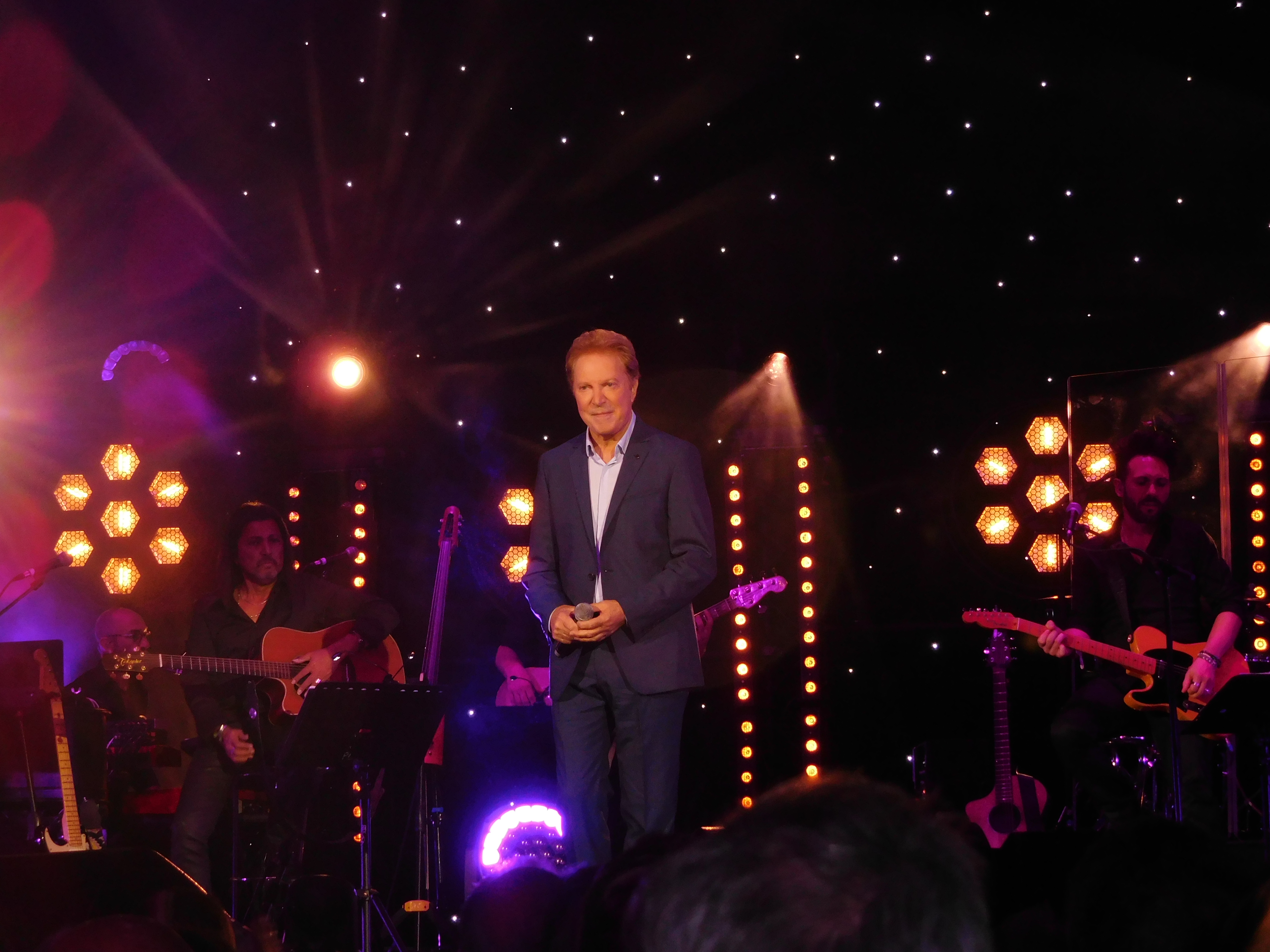

Background information
- Born: Jean-Jacques Lafon; 5 October 1955 (age 70)
- Origin: Occitanie, France
- Genres: Pop
- Occupations: Singer, songwriter
- Years active: Since 1982
- Website: jean-jacques-lafon.com

Jean-Jacques Lafon (born 5 October 1955) is a French singer-songwriter and painter. He remains known for his 1985 one-hit wonder "Le géant de papier", which peaked at No. 6 on the SNEP singles chart and earned a Silver disc. Lafon is also the writer of the 1987 hit "Viens boire un p'tit coup à la maison" for Licence IV, under the pseudonym of Falon.

== Discography ==
=== Albums ===
- 1988 : Mourir à Toulouse
- 1993 : Les Années Caroline
- 1996 : Autoportrait
- 2010 : Le Jardin de mon père

=== Singles ===
- 1982 : "Sa différence"
- 1984 : "C'est beaucoup mieux comme ça"
- 1985 : "Le Géant de papier" – No. 6 in France, Silver
- 1986 : "Si t'as besoin de moi, fais-moi signe"
- 1986 : "Un Mot pour un autre"
- 1987 : "Elle voit"
- 1987 : "Le Diable au cœur"
- 1988 : "Ne laissez pas le soleil se coucher"
- 1988 : "Mourir à Toulouse"
- 1990 : "Seulement te dire..."
- 1991 : "Les Années Caroline"
