= Sheila and B. Devotion =

Disco group

- Origin: France
- Genres: Disco, Eurodisco, pop, R&B
- Years active: 1977–1980
- Label: Carrere Records
- Past members: Sheila; Dany Mac Farlane; Freddy Stracham; Arthur Wilkins

Sheila and B. Devotion (also credited as "Sheila B. Devotion", "Sheila and the Black Devotion" or "S.B. Devotion") was a disco group fronted by French singer Sheila between 1977 and 1980. This formation briefly reached popularity in Europe and to a lesser extent in the US club circuit during the disco era. The group recorded two albums (Singin' in the Rain and King of the World) before dissolving in 1980, when Sheila returned to her solo career.

== History ==
=== Formation ===
Before the group's formation, Sheila (born Annie Chancel in Créteil, France on August 16, 1945) scored numerous hits in her homeland during the 1960s and the 1970s. Among her chart toppers were "L'école est finie" (1963), "Vous les copains" (the French cover version of the Exciters' "Do Wah Diddy Diddy" in 1964), "'Petite Fille de Français Moyens" (1968) and "Les Rois Mages" (the cover of "Tweedle Dee Tweedle Dum" originally performed by Middle of the Road in 1971). Her success helped her producer Claude Carrere to launch his label Carrere Records. The Yé-yé artist was initially presented as a girl next door. In 1977, she completely changed her public image when Sheila & B Devotion was formed. She attempted to convey a more mature style in her music. Three American back-up singers/dancers (Dany Mac Farlane, Freddy Stracham and Arthur Wilkins) known as B. Devotion were hired to accompany her. She updated her bubblegum repertoire by performing disco tracks sung in English.

=== Breakthrough and success ===
==== "Love Me Baby" ====
As Sheila had been a major success as a bubblegum yé-yé singer, the record company Polydor did not want to shock Sheila's public and the French media "Love Me Baby" was released anonymously in May 1977 in France. The first pressings of the record mentioned the obscure name of S.B Devotion. When the song became a radio and club hit in France, the identity of the group was rapidly revealed and the song was attributed to the quartet as Sheila B. Devotion. It was also promoted in the States as by Sheila and B. Devotion. "Love Me Baby" became a mainstream Top 10 hit in Europe with high chart success particularly in German Singles Chart reaching number 9 and the Italian Singles Chart where it reached number 3. It was also a hit in the Netherlands making it to number 24 on the Dutch Top 40.

==== Other hits ====
The follow-up single was a disco version of "Singin' in the Rain" and was more successful. In early 1978, it was licensed to Casablanca Records to be released in the United States where it became a club hit.

The group name was altered in some markets to "Sheila & B. Devotion", while in others the name Sheila B. Devotion was maintained. Essentially, the US market knew the act as "Sheila & B. Devotion", while Canada, Australia, the UK, Ireland and the European markets stuck with the name Sheila B. Devotion. In 1979, the name was officially changed to Sheila & B. Devotion across all markets internationally. In the meantime, the Love Me Baby album (featuring the two above-mentioned hits) came out. The group promoted their records on the major European TV shows (Musikladen, Disco and Top of the Pops).

Sheila & B. Devotion scored other songs on the charts including "I Don't Need A Doctor", "Hôtel De La Plage", "You Light My Fire" and "Seven Lonely Days."

=== Collaboration with Chic ===
In 1979, Sheila collaborated with Nile Rodgers and Bernard Edwards of Chic on the King of the World album. The album featured "Spacer", which peaked at #18 on the UK Singles Chart.

=== Break-up ===
Shortly after the release of the "King Of The World" single, Sheila & B. Devotion disbanded. Due to the disco backlash, Sheila chose a pop-rock style and recorded in 1981 an album, Little Darlin', produced by Keith Olsen. It was her last international project.

=== Legacy ===
Swedish band Alcazar's 2000 song "Crying at the Discoteque" samples "Spacer". "Crying at the Discoteque" topped the dance charts in some countries, and was covered by British singer Sophie Ellis-Bextor in 2020.

"Spacer" was played at 2024 Paris Olympics opening ceremony.

== Discography ==
=== Studio albums ===
Title	Album details	Peak chart positions			
Title	Album details	AUS	BEL (WA)	FRA (Note: French chart positions are from 1984 or later.)	SWE
Singin' in the Rain or Love Me Baby	Released: 1977; Label: Carrere	48	—	168	8
King of the World	Released: 1980; Label: Carrere	—	21	199	—

=== Compilation albums ===
Title	Album details	Peak chart positions
Title	Album details	FRA
Disque d'Or	Released: 1979; Label: Carrere	141
The Disco Singles	Released: 2007; Label: Warner	109

=== Charted singles ===
Title	Year	Peak chart positions								Album
Title	Year	AUS	BEL (FL)	BEL (WA)	GER	NL	SWE	UK	US Dance	Album
"Love Me Baby"	1977	—	10	16	9	19	—	—	—	Singin' in the Rain or Love Me Baby
"Singin' in the Rain"	1977	23	2	1	6	4	2	11	30	Singin' in the Rain or Love Me Baby
"You Light My Fire"	1978	—	—	—	36	—	—	44	—	Non-album singles
"Hôtel de la plage"	1978	—	20	—	—	—	—	—	—	Non-album singles
"Seven Lonely Days"	1979	—	—	—	50	—	16	—	—	Non-album singles
"Spacer"	1979	95	14	—	9	22	—	18	44	King of the World
"—" denotes a recording that did not chart or was not released in that territory.
