= List of number-one singles of 1958 (France) =

This is a list of the French singles & airplay chart reviews number-ones of 1958.

== Number-ones by week ==
=== Singles chart ===
Week	Issue date	Artist(s)	Song	Ref.
1	4 January	The Platters	"Only You (And You Alone)"	
2	11 January	The Platters	"Only You (And You Alone)"	
3	18 January	The Platters	"Only You (And You Alone)"	
4	25 January	The Platters	"Only You (And You Alone)"	
5	1 February	The Platters	"Only You (And You Alone)"	
6	8 February	The Platters	"Only You (And You Alone)"	
7	15 February	Dalida	"Gondolier"	
8	22 February	Dalida	"Gondolier"	
9	1 March	Dalida	"Gondolier"	
10	8 March	Dalida	"Gondolier"	
11	15 March	Annie Cordy	"Hello, le soleil brille"	
12	22 March	Annie Cordy	"Hello, le soleil brille"	
13	29 March	Annie Cordy	"Hello, le soleil brille"	
14	5 April	Annie Cordy	"Hello, le soleil brille"	
15	12 April	Annie Cordy	"Hello, le soleil brille"	
16	19 April	Annie Cordy	"Hello, le soleil brille"	
17	26 April	Annie Cordy	"Hello, le soleil brille"	
18	3 May	Annie Cordy	"Hello, le soleil brille"	
19	10 May	Annie Cordy	"Hello, le soleil brille"	
20	17 May	Annie Cordy	"Hello, le soleil brille"	
21	24 May	Annie Cordy	"Hello, le soleil brille"	
22	31 May	Annie Cordy	"Hello, le soleil brille"	
23	7 June	Annie Cordy	"Hello, le soleil brille"	
24	14 June	Annie Cordy	"Hello, le soleil brille"	
25	21 June	Annie Cordy	"Hello, le soleil brille"	
26	28 June	Annie Cordy	"Hello, le soleil brille"	
27	5 July	Annie Cordy	"Hello, le soleil brille"	
28	12 July	Annie Cordy	"Hello, le soleil brille"	
29	19 July	Annie Cordy	"Hello, le soleil brille"	
30	26 July	Annie Cordy	"Hello, le soleil brille"	
31	2 August	Annie Cordy	"Hello, le soleil brille"	
32	9 August	Annie Cordy	"Hello, le soleil brille"	
33	16 August	Annie Cordy	"Hello, le soleil brille"	
34	23 August	Annie Cordy	"Hello, le soleil brille"	
35	30 August	Annie Cordy	"Hello, le soleil brille"	
36	6 September	Annie Cordy	"Hello, le soleil brille"	
37	13 September	Kalin Twins	"When"	
38	20 September	Kalin Twins	"When"	
39	27 September	Kalin Twins	"When"	
40	4 October	Kalin Twins	"When"	
41	11 October	Kalin Twins	"When"	
42	18 October	Kalin Twins	"When"	
43	25 October	Kalin Twins	"When"	
44	1 November	Kalin Twins	"When"	
45	8 November	Kalin Twins	"When"	
46	15 November	Kalin Twins	"When"	
47	22 November	Kalin Twins	"When"	
48	29 November	Kalin Twins	"When"	
49	6 December	Kalin Twins	"When"	
50	13 December	Kalin Twins	"When"	
51	20 December	Kalin Twins	"When"	
52	27 December	Kalin Twins	"When"	

== See also ==
- 1958 in music
- List of number-one hits (France)
