= List of number-one singles of 1959 (France) =

This is a list of the French singles & airplay chart reviews number-ones of 1959.

== Number-ones by week ==
=== Singles chart ===
Week	Issue date	Artist(s)	Song	Ref.
1	4 January	Kalin Twins	"When"	
2	11 January	Kalin Twins	"When"	
3	18 January	Dalida	"Come prima"	
4	25 January	Dalida	"Come prima"	
5	1 February	Dalida	"Come prima"	
6	8 February	Dalida	"Come prima"	
7	15 February	Dalida	"Guitare et tambourin"	
8	22 February	Dalida	"Guitare et tambourin"	
9	1 March	Dalida	"Guitare et tambourin"	
10	8 March	Dalida	"Guitare et tambourin"	
11	15 March	Annie Cordy	"La marche des gosses"	
12	22 March	Annie Cordy	"La marche des gosses"	
13	29 March	Annie Cordy	"La marche des gosses"	
14	5 April	Annie Cordy	"La marche des gosses"	
15	12 April	Annie Cordy	"La marche des gosses"	
16	19 April	Annie Cordy	"La marche des gosses"	
17	26 April	Guy Béart	"L'Eau vive"	
18	3 May	Guy Béart	"L'Eau vive"	
19	10 May	Guy Béart	"L'Eau vive"	
20	17 May	Jean Philippe	"Oui, oui, oui, oui"	
21	24 May	Jean Philippe	"Oui, oui, oui, oui"	
22	31 May	Jean Philippe	"Oui, oui, oui, oui"	
23	7 June	Jean Philippe	"Oui, oui, oui, oui"	
24	14 June	Sacha Distel	"Ce serait dommage"	
25	21 June	Sacha Distel	"Ce serait dommage"	
26	28 June	Sacha Distel	"Ce serait dommage"	
27	5 July	Sacha Distel	"Ce serait dommage"	
28	12 July	Sacha Distel	"Ce serait dommage"	
29	19 July	Jean Phillipe	"Oui, oui, oui, oui"	
30	26 July	Jean Phillipe	"Oui, oui, oui, oui"	
31	2 August	Jean Phillipe	"Oui, oui, oui, oui"	
32	9 August	Jean Phillipe	"Oui, oui, oui, oui"	
33	16 August	Jean Phillipe	"Oui, oui, oui, oui"	
34	23 August	Jean Phillipe	"Oui, oui, oui, oui"	
35	30 August	Jean Phillipe	"Oui, oui, oui, oui"	
36	6 September	Jean Phillipe	"Oui, oui, oui, oui"	
37	13 September	Dalida	"Ciao, ciao, bambina"	
38	20 September	Dalida	"Ciao, ciao, bambina"	
39	27 September	Dalida	"Ciao, ciao, bambina"	
40	4 October	Dalida	"Ciao, ciao, bambina"	
41	11 October	Gloria Lasso	"Venus"	
42	18 October	Gloria Lasso	"Venus"	
43	25 October	Gloria Lasso	"Venus"	
44	1 November	Gloria Lasso	"Venus"	
45	8 November	Gloria Lasso	"Venus"	
46	15 November	Les Compagnons de la chanson	"Le marchand de bonheur"	
47	22 November	Les Compagnons de la chanson	"Le marchand de bonheur"	
48	29 November	Les Compagnons de la chanson	"Le marchand de bonheur"	
49	6 December	Les Compagnons de la chanson	"Le marchand de bonheur"	
50	13 December	Les Compagnons de la chanson	"Le marchand de bonheur"	
51	20 December	Les Compagnons de la chanson	"Le marchand de bonheur"	
52	27 December	Les Compagnons de la chanson	"Le marchand de bonheur"	

== See also ==
- 1959 in music
- List of number-one hits (France)
