= List of number-one singles of 1972 (France) =

This is a list of the French Singles & Airplay Chart Reviews number-ones of 1972.

== Summary ==
=== Singles Chart ===
Week	Date	Artist	Single
1	6 January	Stone & Eric Charden	"L'avventura"
2	13 January	Stone & Eric Charden	"L'avventura"
3	20 January	Stone & Eric Charden	"L'avventura"
4	27 January	Stone & Eric Charden	"L'avventura"
5	3 February	Ringo	"Elle, je ne veux qu'elle"
6	10 February	Ringo	"Elle, je ne veux qu'elle"
7	17 February	Ringo	"Elle, je ne veux qu'elle"
8	24 February	Ringo	"Elle, je ne veux qu'elle"
9	2 March	Gérard Lenorman	"De toi"
10	9 March	Gérard Lenorman	"De toi"
11	16 March	Gérard Lenorman	"De toi"
12	23 March	Middle of the Road	"Samson and Delilah"
13	30 March	Middle of the Road	"Samson and Delilah"
14	6 April	Middle of the Road	"Samson and Delilah"
15	13 April	Middle of the Road	"Samson and Delilah"
16	20 April	Middle of the Road	"Samson and Delilah"
17	27 April	Ennio Morricone	"Il était une fois la révolution"
18	4 May	Mike Brant	"Qui saura?"
19	11 May	Mike Brant	"Qui saura?"
20	18 May	Mike Brant	"Qui saura?"
21	25 May	Mike Brant	"Qui saura?"
22	1 June	C. Jérôme	"Kiss Me"
23	8 June	C. Jérôme	"Kiss Me"
24	15 June	C. Jérôme	"Kiss Me"
25	22 June	C. Jérôme	"Kiss Me"
26	29 June	Mike Brant	"Qui saura?"
27	6 July	Mike Brant	"Qui saura?"
28	13 July	Hot Butter	"Popcorn"
29	20 July	Hot Butter	"Popcorn"
30	27 July	Hot Butter	"Popcorn"
31	3 August	Hot Butter	"Popcorn"
32	10 August	Hot Butter	"Popcorn"
33	17 August	Hot Butter	"Popcorn"
34	24 August	Hot Butter	"Popcorn"
35	31 August	Michel Fugain et le Big Bazar	"Une belle histoire"
36	7 September	Michel Fugain et le Big Bazar	"Une belle histoire"
37	14 September	Michel Fugain et le Big Bazar	"Une belle histoire"
38	21 September	Michel Fugain et le Big Bazar	"Une belle histoire"
39	28 September	Mike Brant	"C'est ma prière"
40	5 October	Mike Brant	"C'est ma prière"
41	12 October	Mike Brant	"C'est ma prière"
42	19 October	Mike Brant	"C'est ma prière"
43	26 October	Mike Brant	"C'est ma prière"
44	2 November	Mike Brant	"C'est ma prière"
45	9 November	Mike Brant	"C'est ma prière"
46	16 November	Mike Brant	"C'est ma prière"
47	23 November	Mike Brant	"C'est ma prière"
48	30 November	Mike Brant	"C'est ma prière"
49	7 December	Mike Brant	"C'est ma prière"
50	14 December	Mike Brant	"C'est ma prière"
51	21 December	Mike Brant	"C'est ma prière"
52	28 December	Claude François	"Le lundi au soleil"

== See also ==
- 1972 in music
- List of number-one hits (France)
