= List of number-one singles of 1955 (France) =

This is a list of the French singles and airplay chart reviews number-ones of 1955.

== Number-ones by week ==
=== Singles chart ===
Week	Issue date	Artist(s)	Song	Ref.
40	5 October	Jacqueline François	"Les Lavandières du Portugal"	
41	12 October	Jacqueline François	"Les Lavandières du Portugal"	
42	19 October	Jacqueline François	"Les Lavandières du Portugal"	
43	26 October	Jacqueline François	"Les Lavandières du Portugal"	
44	2 November	Jacqueline François	"Les Lavandières du Portugal"	
45	9 November	Jacqueline François	"Les Lavandières du Portugal"	
46	16 November	Jacqueline François	"Les Lavandières du Portugal"	
47	23 November	Jacqueline François	"Les Lavandières du Portugal"	
48	30 November	Jacqueline François	"Les Lavandières du Portugal"	
49	7 December	Eddie and Tania Constantine	"L'Homme et l'Enfant" (lit. "The Old Man and the Little Boy")	
50	14 December	Eddie and Tania Constantine	"L'Homme et l'Enfant" (lit. "The Old Man and the Little Boy")	
51	21 December	Eddie and Tania Constantine	"L'Homme et l'Enfant" (lit. "The Old Man and the Little Boy")	
52	28 December	Eddie and Tania Constantine	"L'Homme et l'Enfant" (lit. "The Old Man and the Little Boy")	

== See also ==
- 1955 in music
- List of number-one hits (France)
