= List of number-one singles of 1987 (France) =

This is a list of the French SNEP Top 100 Singles number-ones of 1987.

== Summary ==
=== Singles chart ===
Week	Issue Date	Artist	Single
1	4 January	Elsa	"T'en va pas"
2	11 January	Elsa	"T'en va pas"
3	18 January	Elsa	"T'en va pas"
4	25 January	Elsa	"T'en va pas"
5	1 February	Elsa	"T'en va pas"
6	8 February	Elsa	"T'en va pas"
7	15 February	Elsa	"T'en va pas"
8	22 February	Elsa	"T'en va pas"
9	1 March	Francis Lalanne	"On se retrouvera"
10	8 March	Francis Lalanne	"On se retrouvera"
11	15 March	Francis Lalanne	"On se retrouvera"
12	22 March	Francis Lalanne	"On se retrouvera"
13	29 March	Francis Lalanne	"On se retrouvera"
14	5 April	Francis Lalanne	"On se retrouvera"
15	12 April	Licence IV	"Viens boire un p'tit coup à la maison"
16	19 April	Licence IV	"Viens boire un p'tit coup à la maison"
17	26 April	Licence IV	"Viens boire un p'tit coup à la maison"
18	3 May	Licence IV	"Viens boire un p'tit coup à la maison"
19	10 May	Licence IV	"Viens boire un p'tit coup à la maison"
20	17 May	Licence IV	"Viens boire un p'tit coup à la maison"
21	24 May	Licence IV	"Viens boire un p'tit coup à la maison"
22	31 May	Licence IV	"Viens boire un p'tit coup à la maison"
23	7 June	Licence IV	"Viens boire un p'tit coup à la maison"
24	14 June	Licence IV	"Viens boire un p'tit coup à la maison"
25	21 June	Licence IV	"Viens boire un p'tit coup à la maison"
26	28 June	Licence IV	"Viens boire un p'tit coup à la maison"
27	5 July	Licence IV	"Viens boire un p'tit coup à la maison"
28	12 July	Madonna	"La Isla Bonita"
29	19 July	Madonna	"La Isla Bonita"
30	26 July	Madonna	"La Isla Bonita"
31	2 August	Vanessa Paradis	"Joe le taxi"
32	9 August	Vanessa Paradis	"Joe le taxi"
33	16 August	Vanessa Paradis	"Joe le taxi"
34	23 August	Vanessa Paradis	"Joe le taxi"
35	30 August	Vanessa Paradis	"Joe le taxi"
36	6 September	Vanessa Paradis	"Joe le taxi"
37	13 September	Vanessa Paradis	"Joe le taxi"
38	20 September	Vanessa Paradis	"Joe le taxi"
39	27 September	Vanessa Paradis	"Joe le taxi"
40	4 October	Vanessa Paradis	"Joe le taxi"
41	11 October	Vanessa Paradis	"Joe le taxi"
42	18 October	Los Lobos	"La Bamba"
43	25 October	Los Lobos	"La Bamba"
44	1 November	Los Lobos	"La Bamba"
45	8 November	Los Lobos	"La Bamba"
46	15 November	Los Lobos	"La Bamba"
47	22 November	Los Lobos	"La Bamba"
48	29 November	Los Lobos	"La Bamba"
49	6 December	Los Lobos	"La Bamba"
50	13 December	Los Lobos	"La Bamba"
51	20 December	Los Lobos	"La Bamba"
52	27 December	Los Lobos	"La Bamba"

== See also ==
- 1987 in music
- List of number-one hits (France)
- List of artists who reached number one on the French Singles Chart
