= List of number-one singles of 1964 (France) =

This is a list of the French Singles & Airplay Chart Reviews number-ones of 1964.

== Summary ==
=== Singles Chart ===
Week	Issue Date	Artist	Single
1	4 January	Claude François	"Si J'avais un Marteau"
2	11 January	Sylvie Vartan	"Si Je Chante"
3	18 January	Sylvie Vartan	"Si Je Chante"
4	25 January	Sylvie Vartan	"Si Je Chante"
5	1 February	Sylvie Vartan	"Si Je Chante"
6	8 February	Sylvie Vartan	"Si Je Chante"
7	15 February	Charles Aznavour	"La Mamma"
8	22 February	Charles Aznavour	"Et Pourtant"
9	29 February	Charles Aznavour	"Et Pourtant"
10	7 March	Charles Aznavour	"Et Pourtant"
11	14 March	Charles Aznavour	"Et Pourtant"
12	21 March	Charles Aznavour	"Et Pourtant"
13	28 March	Richard Anthony	"A Présent Tu Peux T'en Aller"
14	4 April	Richard Anthony	"A Présent Tu Peux T'en Aller"
15	11 April	Richard Anthony	"A Présent Tu Peux T'en Aller"
16	18 April	Sylvie Vartan	"La Plus Belle Pour Aller Danser"
17	25 April	Sylvie Vartan	"La Plus Belle Pour Aller Danser"
18	2 May	Sylvie Vartan	"La Plus Belle Pour Aller Danser"
19	9 May	Sylvie Vartan	"La Plus Belle Pour Aller Danser"
20	16 May	Sylvie Vartan	"La Plus Belle Pour Aller Danser"
21	23 May	Sylvie Vartan	"La Plus Belle Pour Aller Danser"
22	30 May	Sylvie Vartan	"La Plus Belle Pour Aller Danser"
23	6 June	Sylvie Vartan	"La Plus Belle Pour Aller Danser"
24	13 June	Sylvie Vartan	"La Plus Belle Pour Aller Danser"
25	20 June	Sylvie Vartan	"La Plus Belle Pour Aller Danser"
26	27 June	Sylvie Vartan	"La Plus Belle Pour Aller Danser"
27	4 July	Frank Alamo	"Allo, Maillot 38-37?"
28	11 July	Johnny Hallyday	"Les Mauvais Garçons"
29	18 July	Claude François	"J'y Pense et Puis J'oublie"
30	25 July	Claude François	"J'y Pense et Puis J'oublie"
31	1 August	Claude François	"J'y Pense et Puis J'oublie"
32	8 August	Claude François	"J'y Pense et Puis J'oublie"
33	15 August	Richard Anthony	"Ce Monde"
34	22 August	Richard Anthony	"Ce Monde"
35	29 August	Richard Anthony	"Ce Monde"
36	5 September	Richard Anthony	"Ce Monde"
37	12 September	Richard Anthony	"Ce Monde"
38	19 September	Richard Anthony	"Ce Monde"
39	26 September	Salvatore Adamo	"Vous Permettez Monsieur?"
40	3 October	Salvatore Adamo	"Vous Permettez Monsieur?"
41	10 October	Salvatore Adamo	"Vous Permettez Monsieur?"
42	17 October	Johnny Hallyday	"Le Pénitencier"
43	24 October	Johnny Hallyday	"Le Pénitencier"
44	31 October	Johnny Hallyday	"Le Pénitencier"
45	7 November	Johnny Hallyday	"Le Pénitencier"
46	14 November	Johnny Hallyday	"Le Pénitencier"
47	21 November	Johnny Hallyday	"Le Pénitencier"
48	28 November	Johnny Hallyday	"Le Pénitencier"
49	5 December	Claude François	"Donna, Donna"
50	12 December	Claude François	"Donna, Donna"
51	19 December	France Gall	"Sacré Charlemagne"
52	26 December	France Gall	"Sacré Charlemagne"

== See also ==
- 1964 in music
- List of number-one hits (France)
