= List of number-one singles of 1997 (France) =

This is a list of the French SNEP Top 100 Singles number-ones of 1997.

== Summary ==
=== Singles Chart ===
Week	Date	Artist	Single
1	January 4	Gala	"Freed from Desire"
2	January 11	Gala	"Freed from Desire"
3	January 18	Gala	"Freed from Desire"
4	January 25	Madonna	"Don't Cry for Me Argentina"
5	February 1	Madonna	"Don't Cry for Me Argentina"
6	February 8	Madonna	"Don't Cry for Me Argentina"
7	February 15	Madonna	"Don't Cry for Me Argentina"
8	February 22	Gala	"Let a Boy Cry"
9	March 1	Andrea Bocelli	"Con te partirò"
10	March 8	Gala	"Let a Boy Cry"
11	March 15	Andrea Bocelli	"Con te partirò"
12	March 22	Andrea Bocelli	"Con te partirò"
13	March 29	Andrea Bocelli	"Con te partirò"
14	April 5	Andrea Bocelli	"Con te partirò"
15	April 12	Ricky Martin	"María"
16	April 19	Ricky Martin	"María"
17	April 26	Ricky Martin	"María"
18	May 3	Ricky Martin	"María"
19	May 10	Ricky Martin	"María"
20	May 17	Ricky Martin	"María"
21	May 24	Ricky Martin	"María"
22	May 31	Ricky Martin	"María"
23	June 7	Ricky Martin	"María"
24	June 14	Wes	"Alane"
25	June 21	Wes	"Alane"
26	June 28	Wes	"Alane"
27	July 5	Wes	"Alane"
28	July 12	Wes	"Alane"
29	July 19	Wes	"Alane"
30	July 26	Wes	"Alane"
31	August 2	Wes	"Alane"
32	August 9	Wes	"Alane"
33	August 16	Wes	"Alane"
34	August 23	Will Smith	"Men in Black"
35	August 30	Will Smith	"Men in Black"
36	September 6	Will Smith	"Men in Black"
37	September 13	Elton John	"Candle in the Wind 1997/Something About the Way You Look Tonight"
38	September 20	Elton John	"Candle in the Wind 1997/Something About the Way You Look Tonight"
39	September 27	Elton John	"Candle in the Wind 1997/Something About the Way You Look Tonight"
40	October 4	Elton John	"Candle in the Wind 1997/Something About the Way You Look Tonight"
41	October 11	Elton John	"Candle in the Wind 1997/Something About the Way You Look Tonight"
42	October 18	Elton John	"Candle in the Wind 1997/Something About the Way You Look Tonight"
43	October 25	Florent Pagny	"Savoir aimer"
44	November 1	Aqua	"Barbie Girl"
45	November 8	Florent Pagny	"Savoir aimer"
46	November 15	Florent Pagny	"Savoir aimer"
47	November 22	Florent Pagny	"Savoir aimer"
48	November 29	Florent Pagny	"Savoir aimer"
49	December 6	Florent Pagny	"Savoir aimer"
50	December 13	Florent Pagny	"Savoir aimer"
51	December 20	Florent Pagny	"Savoir aimer"
52	December 27	Florent Pagny	"Savoir aimer"

== See also ==
- 1997 in music
- List of number-one singles in France
- List of artists who reached number one on the French Singles Chart
