= List of number-one singles of 1994 (France) =

This is a list of the French SNEP Top 100 Singles number-ones of 1994.

== Summary ==
=== Singles Chart ===
Week	Issue Date	Artist	Single
1	January 1	Freddie Mercury	"Living on My Own"
3	February 8	Freddie Mercury	"Living on My Own"
3	January 15	Bryan Adams	"Please Forgive Me"
4	January 22	Freddie Mercury	"Living on My Own"
5	January 29	Bryan Adams	"Please Forgive Me"
6	February 5	Ace of Base	"Happy Nation"
7	February 12	Alain Souchon	"Foule sentimentale"
8	February 19	Ace of Base	"Happy Nation"
9	February 26	Ace of Base	"Happy Nation"
10	March 5	Ace of Base	"Happy Nation"
11	March 12	IAM	"Je danse le Mia"
12	March 19	IAM	"Je danse le Mia"
13	March 26	IAM	"Je danse le Mia"
14	April 2	IAM	"Je danse le Mia"
15	April 9	IAM	"Je danse le Mia"
16	April 16	Bruce Springsteen	"Streets of Philadelphia"
17	April 23	Bruce Springsteen	"Streets of Philadelphia"
18	April 30	Bruce Springsteen	"Streets of Philadelphia"
19	May 7	East 17	"It's Alright"
20	May 14	East 17	"It's Alright"
21	May 21	IAM	"Je danse le mia"
22	May 28	IAM	"Je danse le mia"
23	June 4	Bruce Springsteen	"Streets of Philadelphia"
24	June 11	IAM	"Je danse le mia"
25	June 18	Jimmy Cliff	"I Can See Clearly Now"
26	June 25	Jimmy Cliff	"I Can See Clearly Now"
27	July 2	Jimmy Cliff	"I Can See Clearly Now"
28	July 9	Reel 2 Real and The Mad Stuntman	"I Like to Move It"
29	July 16	Reel 2 Real and The Mad Stuntman	"I Like to Move It"
30	July 23	Reel 2 Real and The Mad Stuntman	"I Like to Move It"
31	July 30	Reel 2 Real and The Mad Stuntman	"I Like to Move It"
32	August 6	Reel 2 Real and The Mad Stuntman	"I Like to Move It"
33	August 13	Youssou N'Dour and Neneh Cherry	"7 Seconds"
34	August 20	Youssou N'Dour and Neneh Cherry	"7 Seconds"
35	August 27	Youssou N'Dour and Neneh Cherry	"7 Seconds"
36	September 3	Youssou N'Dour and Neneh Cherry	"7 Seconds"
37	September 10	Youssou N'Dour and Neneh Cherry	"7 Seconds"
38	September 17	Youssou N'Dour and Neneh Cherry	"7 Seconds"
39	September 24	Youssou N'Dour and Neneh Cherry	"7 Seconds"
40	October 1	Youssou N'Dour and Neneh Cherry	"7 Seconds"
41	October 8	Youssou N'Dour and Neneh Cherry	"7 Seconds"
42	October 15	Youssou N'Dour and Neneh Cherry	"7 Seconds"
43	October 22	Youssou N'Dour and Neneh Cherry	"7 Seconds"
44	October 29	Youssou N'Dour and Neneh Cherry	"7 Seconds"
45	November 5	Youssou N'Dour and Neneh Cherry	"7 Seconds"
46	November 12	Youssou N'Dour and Neneh Cherry	"7 Seconds"
47	November 19	Youssou N'Dour and Neneh Cherry	"7 Seconds"
48	November 26	Youssou N'Dour and Neneh Cherry	"7 Seconds"
49	December 3	Elton John	"Can You Feel the Love Tonight"
50	December 10	Elton John	"Can You Feel the Love Tonight"
51	December 17	Elton John	"Can You Feel the Love Tonight"
52	December 24	Elton John	"Can You Feel the Love Tonight"
53	December 31	Elton John	"Can You Feel the Love Tonight"

== See also ==
- 1994 in music
- List of number-one singles in France
- List of artists who reached number one on the French Singles Chart
