= Sacré Charlemagne =

- Cover of the EP Sacré Charlemagne

Song by France Gall

from the EP Sacré Charlemagne
- A-side: "Sacré Charlemagne" "Au clair de la lune"
- B-side: "Nounours" "Bonne nuit"
- Released: 1964
- Length: 2:50
- Label: Philips
- Composer: Georges Liferman
- Lyricist: Robert Gall

Music video
- "Sacré Charlemagne" (live on French TV, 1972) on YouTube

Professional ratings
Review scores
Source	Rating
Billboard	"Spotlight" pick

"Sacré Charlemagne" is a song by France Gall. It was released in 1964 on an EP credited to France Gall and her little friends, and later appeared as the opening track on an album known by the same name. According to the charts U.S. Billboard published in its "Hits of the World" section, the song reached no. 1 in France.

== Lyrics ==
The song's lyrics were written by Robert Gall, the singer's father. They are about medieval emperor Charlemagne, traditionally seen as the "inventor of school", since education became mandatory for all children during his reign. Because of this the narrator of the song blames Charlemagne for having to go to school.

The song reflected contempt for studying among young people.

== Reception ==
The song was France Gall's first major success, selling over 2 million copies. In addition to reaching #1 on the French music charts, the song enjoyed international success, becoming a hit in Japan. Its popularity endures as a French schoolchildren's song.

=== Charts ===
Chart (1964–65)	Peak position
France	1
Belgium (Ultratop 50 Wallonia)	4

== See also ==
- List of number-one singles of 1964 (France)
- List of number-one singles of 1965 (France)
