= Adiós Amor (Sheila song) =

Single by Sheila

from the album Dans une heure
- B-side: "La Porte En Bois"
- Released: 1967
- Label: Philips Records
- Composer(s): Claude Carrère
- Lyricist(s): Jacques Plante
- Producer(s): Sam Clayton

Sheila singles chronology
"La Famille" (1967)	"Adiós Amor" (1967)	"Le Kilt" (1967)

"Adiós Amor" is a 1967 hit French-language song by French singer Sheila. It was one of the series of four hit singles in 1967 which made her best-selling artist of the year. Lyrics were by Jacques Plante, music by Claude Carrère and the recording was produced by American Sam Clayton. The song begins "Je ressens de l'amour pour toi."

== Releases ==
On the B-side was "La Porte En Bois", a French cover of "Mr. Abercrombie Taught Me" by Murray & G. Aber, fitted to new French lyrics by Claude Carrère. An EP version included two more song "Le Jour Le Plus Beau De L'ete" by Kluger and André Salvet, and "Tout Le Monde Aime Danser", a version of the Podell song "Everybody Loves Saturday Night" arranged by Carrère and Plante. It also featured as the title track in the 1969 compilation album Adiós Amor. Sheila recorded an Italian version for the Italian market.
