= King of the World (album) =

Studio album by Sheila and B. Devotion
- Released: June 27, 1980
- Recorded: 1979
- Studio: Power Station, New York City
- Genre: Disco; funk; R&B; jazz; samba
- Length: 34:31
- Label: Mirage / Carrere / Warner
- Producer: Nile Rodgers, Bernard Edwards

Sheila and B. Devotion chronology
Sheila and B. Devotion (1979)	King of the World (1980)	Little Darlin' (1981)

King of the World is the final album by French disco act Sheila and B. Devotion, released on June 27, 1980. The album which was both written and produced by Bernard Edwards and Nile Rodgers of American R&B band Chic includes the hit "Spacer" which reached No. 18 on the UK charts in early 1980 and was a Top 10 hit in most of Europe, selling more than 5 million copies worldwide. The album displays some elements unusual in Chic productions, such as prominent guitar solos in place of the breakdowns that were normally a staple part of the Chic sound, and some unusual lyrical subject matter, such as the sci-fi themed "Spacer" and a humorous song about credit cards.

== Background ==
King of the World was one of four albums to be written and produced by Edwards and Rodgers in 1980, the other three being Sister Sledge's Love Somebody Today, Chic's fourth studio album Real People and Diana Ross' multiplatinum selling Diana.

King of the World was first released on compact disc in 1996 by both East-West Music and Rhino Records. A remastered edition was issued by Warner Music France in 2006 including bonus tracks which are remixes dating from 1992 and the unreleased US promo version of "Your Love Is Good," whose instrumental can also be found on an outtake from Chic's 2010 box set "The Chic Organization" (there was also an alternate version that featured a piano break in place of the Chic guitar riffs). The latter also had been rerecorded by Sheila on numerous occasions.

An 18 CD box-set of all Sheila's recordings was released in 2006 and a new remix of "Spacer" was included. The "Freak Out - Respect to CHIC" remix using the original instrumental and vocal tracks. Sheila re-recorded "Spacer" only once in 1998 and six remixes were released.

The original American tapes have been digitally remastered for the first time and released on a deluxe edition in October 2008 by Warner Music France. It includes a 32-page booklet with exclusive interviews of Sheila and Nile Rodgers and unknown out-takes from the recording sessions. In 2013, the two reunited for the first time since the album was released to do a brief acoustic version of "Spacer."

== Track listing ==
All tracks written by Bernard Edwards and Nile Rodgers

Side A

1. "Spacer" - 6:15
2. "Mayday" - 3:44
3. "Charge Plates and Credit Cards" - 4:26
4. "Misery" - 3:02

Side B

1. "King of the World" - 4:37
2. "Cover Girls" - 3:17
3. "Your Love Is Good" - 4:38
4. "Don't Go" - 4:32

Bonus tracks 2006 French deluxe edition

1. "Your Love Is Good" (Original US 12" Promo) - 4:50
2. "Spacer" (Lost in Space Mix) - 6:45
3. "Spacer" (Lost in Space Dub Mix) - 6:09
4. "Spacer" (Down to Earth Mix) - 7:29
5. "Spacer" (Remix Radio Edit) - 0:02
6. "Spacer" (DMC Remix) - 1:24
7. "Spacer" (Trevor Is King) - 5:49

== Personnel ==
- Sheila – lead vocals
- Alfa Anderson – backing vocals
- Fonzi Thornton – backing vocals
- Luci Martin – backing vocals
- Michelle Cobbs – backing vocals
- Bernard Edwards – bass guitar
- Tony Thompson – drums
- Nile Rodgers – guitar
- Andrew Barrett (Schwartz) – piano
- Raymond Jones – keyboards, Fender Rhodes
- Sammy Figueroa – percussion
- Cheryl Hong (The Chic Strings) – strings
- Karen Milne (The Chic Strings) – strings
- Marianne Carroll (The Chic Strings) – strings
- Gene Orloff – concert master
- Kris Bryant – lights producer, intern

== Production ==
- All songs produced by Nile Rodgers and Bernard Edwards for the CHIC Organization Ltd.
- Bob Clearmountain - sound engineer
- Bill Scheniman - engineer
- Larry Alexander - engineer
- Joe Gastwirt - mastering
- John Shaw - photography
- Recorded & mixed at Power Station Studio, New York

== "Spacer" ==
The single "Spacer" was ranked at number eight among the top "Tracks of the Year" for 1979 by NME and was sampled more than twenty years later by the team behind Europop act Army of Lovers (including Alexander Bard) for the Swedish group Alcazar. This record by Alcazar was "Crying at the Discotheque" which reached Number 13 in the UK Singles Chart and which was one of three hits by Alcazar in the UK chart to have sampled a production by The Chic Organization. In 2020, Sophie Ellis-Bextor released a cover of "Crying at the Discotheque" as the lead single from her UK Top 10 album Songs from the Kitchen Disco, while Crew 7 & Jaques Raupé released a dance version of "Spacer" on the Kontor Records label.
