= Ringo (singer) =

- Born: Guy Bayle; 11 May 1947 (age 78)
- Origin: Toulouse, Occitanie, France
- Genres: Pop music
- Occupation: Singer
- Years active: 1972–early 1980s

Guy Bayle (born 11 May 1947), known as Ringo and Ringo Willy Cat, is a French pop singer who became famous in the 1970s. According to Billboard magazine he "enjoyed a huge amount of sales" with various hits. Bayle was cited by Billboard as an example of a French artist having a big impact in exporting French songs to the international arena and creating international hits despite the language barrier which French artists face abroad. He was married to Sheila, a female French singer. Bayle's career ended in the mid–'80s.

== Early life ==
Ringo, during his high-school years in Toulouse, enjoyed reading Albert Camus as well as literary works by other authors. He also wrote and performed songs and played the guitar. As a composer he was influenced by the American music of the era. In the late '60s he met musician Pierre Groscolas and the two formed the group Chœurs. After some initial success in Toulouse, the group decided to go to Paris.

== Music career ==
Ringo was discovered in Paris by Mario Padovan, a photographer and publisher of teen-girl magazines Nous Deux and Télé Poche who suggested to the young artist that he appear in one of his magazines. It was during a photo shoot at Padovan's magazines that Ringo met his future wife, Sheila. Meeting her led to his being introduced to Claude Carrère, who became the manager of his musical career.

Carrère, a pioneer, who at the time, was France's most successful independent producer, launched Ringo's career in 1971. His first big hit under Carrère's management was Elle, je ne veux qu’elle. Carrère wanted to capture the teenage market before they were attracted by established stars. Carrère augmented his distribution network by entering into a deal with Sonopresse in 1972. Under the deal, he released his first two discs under the Sonopresse label, one of which was Trop Belle Pour Rester Seule by Ringo. At the time, he also sang Help, Get Me Some Help in French, selling over one million records in France. He also sang a rendition of the international hit, "Mamy Blue", by Los Pop Tops.

Both Ringo and Sheila were managed by Carrère. In a 1974 interview to Billboard, Carrère mentioned that the wedding of Sheila and Ringo was attended by 15,000 people at the city hall and "resembled a royal wedding". In the 1970s, Ringo sold 30 million records with hits such as Elle, je ne veux qu'elle, Ma jalousie, Les Oiseaux de Thaïlande, Rosanna fille sauvage and Goodbye Elvis. In 1973, his single Ma jalousie was featured in Billboard's Hits of the World in Belgium's and Switzerland's top 10 at No. 7, while his LP Ringo was at No. 8 in Belgium. With his then-wife Sheila, he also recorded a duet, Les gondoles à Venise, which became a big hit. In 1980, he discontinued his association with Carrère and produced Allô à l'OVNI, followed by L'ange exterminateur (L'Antéchrist) in 1982. These were followed in 1983 by J'ai toujours besoin d'amour, with Une star s'endort ainsi on the flip–side, his last records.

To this date, there has been no compilation of his hits in CD format.

== Business career ==
In 1985, he opened City Rock Café in Paris, which closed in 1993. Soon after, he left France for Florida and then after some years he returned to Toulouse, where in 2001 he opened an American-nostalgia themed restaurant named Jim Mc Mahon's world famous cafe with his current wife Annick who also functioned as the acting artistic director of the place at the time. Ringo planned to decorate the restaurant with iconic artifacts from the 1950s such as a likeness of Marilyn Monroe in the subway scene, the Creature from the Black Lagoon and the Curtiss-Wright X-19 experimental aircraft, which he wanted to import from the United States. The Toulouse restaurant was to be part of a national chain. In early 2000 this restaurant closed as well.

== Personal life ==
In 1975, he and Sheila had a son named Ludovic Chancel, who became a writer. After the couple were divorced in 1977, Ringo rarely, if ever, saw his son. In 1981, Ringo married Annick, his second wife. In 2005, Chancel published an autobiography entitled Fils de in which, among other things, he relates the details of his upbringing and his relationship with his parents. In 1982, Ringo sold his biography to France Dimanche. Ludovic died in 2017, leaving behind his daughter, Tara Rose (b. 2001)

== Discography ==
- Elle, je ne veux qu'elle (1971)
- L'Homme (1971)
- Juges (1971)
- Ma jalousie (1972)
- Trop belle pour rester seule (1972)
- Les Gondoles à Venise (1973) (with Sheila)
- Lady Banana (1973)
- Tentation (1973)
- Une bague, un collier (1973)
- Une heure, une nuit (1973)
- Accepte-moi (1974)
- Érotisme conjugal (1974)
- Remets ce disque (1974)
- Chica salvaje (1975)
- Fille sauvage (1975)
- Obsession (1975)
- Rossana(1975)
- La Rupture (1975)
- L'amour et la loi (1976)
- C'était comment? (1976)
- Cynthia (1976)
- L'Enfant de Frisco (1976)
- Little duck (1976)
- Noël, c'est Noël (1976)
- Les Oiseaux de Thaïlande (1976)
- La fille que j'aime (1977)
- Goodbye, Elvis (1977)
- Une rose en enfer (1977)
- Les violons de Verlaine (1977)
- Darlin' (1978)
- Ma Pompadour (1978)
- Je suis un vagabond (1979)
- Ma Pompadour (en concert) (1979)
- Medley (en concert) (1979)
- Qui est ce grand corbeau noir? (1979)
- Tentation (en concert) (1979)
- Allô à l'ovni (1980)
- Marilyn no se quiere casar (1980)
- Le Macho des canapés (1981)
- L'ange exterminateur (L'antéchrist) (1982)
- Drapeau (1982)
- Lolita paprika (1982)
- Michaël (1982)
- My baby avait raison (1982)
- Parano Man (1982)
- La voix du magnétophone (1982)
- J'ai toujours besoin d'amour (1983)
