= Noëlle Cordier =

French singer (born 1944)

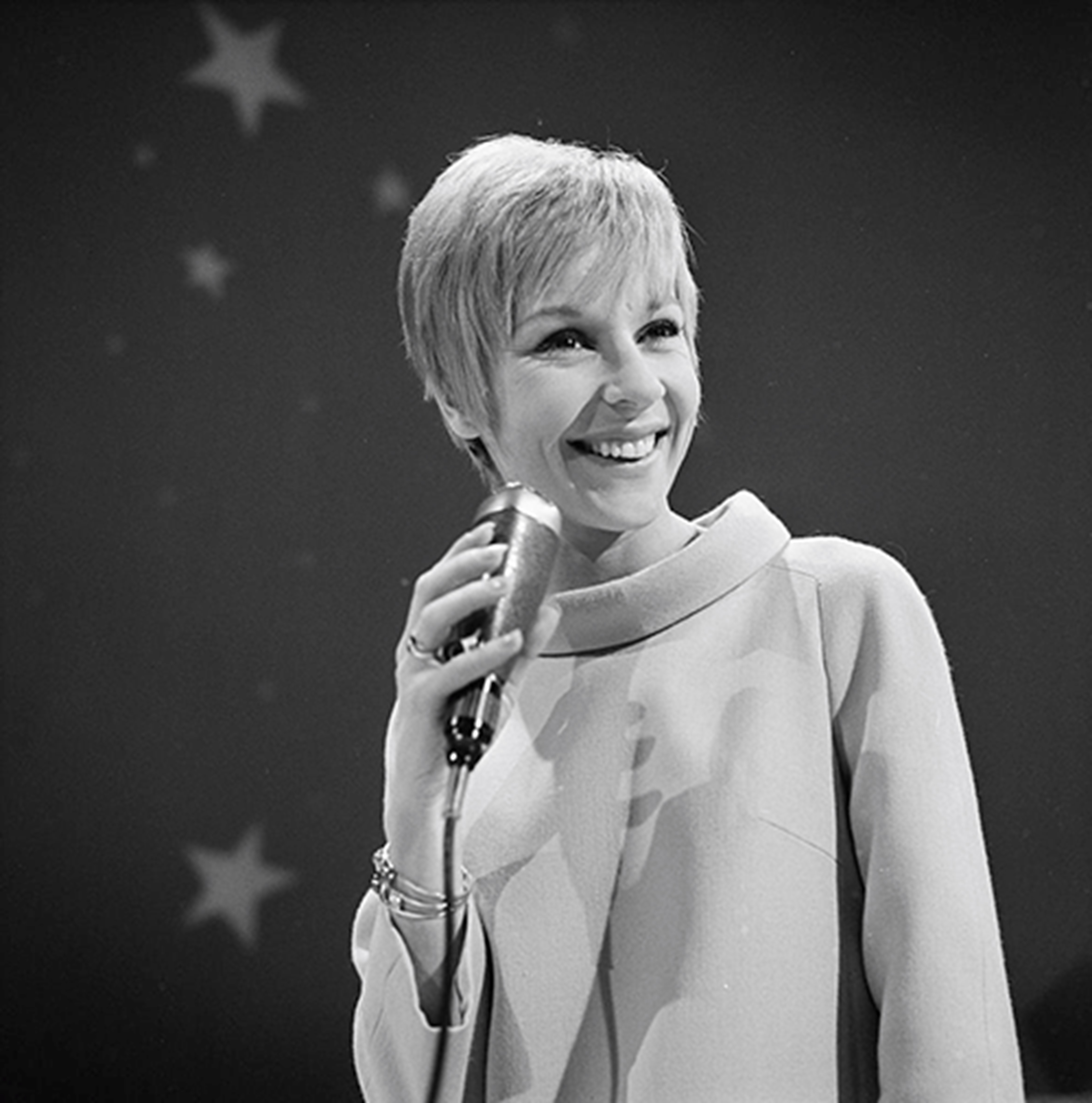
Noëlle Cordier (Dutch TV, 1967)

Noëlle Cordier (born 7 April 1944) is a French singer. She participated for France in the 1967 Eurovision Song Contest in Vienna with the song "Il doit faire beau là-bas", finishing in third place of 17 entries (behind the runaway winner Sandie Shaw for the United Kingdom, and Ireland's Sean Dunphy).

Cordier was born in the 18th arrondissement of Paris. She signed a contract with the record label Barclay shortly before being chosen for Eurovision. Cordier attempted a return to the Eurovision Song Contest in 1970 with the song "Comme en pourrait s'aimer" but it was not selected to represent France.

In 1973, she appeared in the Rock Opera "La Révolution Française" in Paris, and in 1974 she enjoyed success with the song "Tu T'En Vas", a duet with male singer Alain Barrière (who had represented France at the 1963 Eurovision Song Contest in London). Songs such as "Un Amour Comme Le Nôtre", "Aimer Comme Je T'Aime" and "Mon Cœur Pour Te Garder" also found popularity in France and Quebec. In 1978, Cordier participated in the French qualifying heat of the Eurovision Song Contest with the song "Tombe l'eau" but did not win. She retired in 1981, although she has since appeared infrequently on television shows in France.

Preceded by Dominique Walter withChez nous	France in the Eurovision Song Contest; 1967	Succeeded by Isabelle Aubret withLa source
