= L'école est finie =

Single by Sheila
- Released: 1962
- Recorded: 1962
- Genre: yé-yé
- Length: 2:35
- Label: Philips
- Songwriter: Claude Carrère

Audio
- "L'école est finie" on YouTube

"L'école est finie" (English translation: "School is out") is a song by French singer Sheila. She released it in 1962, at the age of 16. Written, published and produced by young Claude Carrère, the song sold over 1 million copies and effectively kick-started his career in the music business.

== Lyrics ==
The song reflected contempt for studying among young people and the wantings of enjoying a fun summer vacation break instead.

== Charts ==
| Chart (1963) | Peak position |
|---|---|
| Belgium (Ultratop 50 Wallonia) | 2 |
