= Sheila (French singer) =

French singer (born 1945)

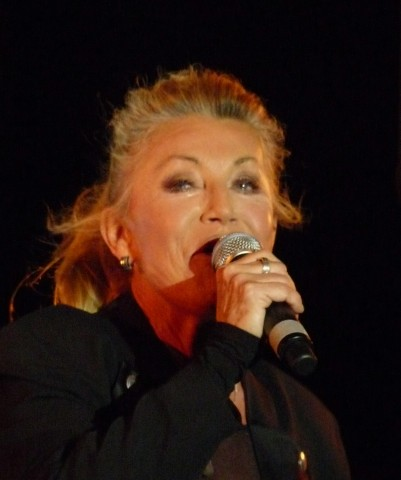
- Sheila, February 2008

Background information
- Also known as: Sheila (and) B. Devotion, SB Devotion
- Born: Annie Chancel; 16 August 1945 (age 80); Créteil, France
- Genres: Yé-yé; pop; disco; chanson
- Occupations: Singer, dancer, actress, TV presenter, author
- Years active: 1962–present
- Labels: Carrere, Warner
- Website: www.sheilahome.com

Annie Chancel (born 16 August 1945), known as Sheila, is a French pop singer who became successful as a solo artist in the 1960s and 1970s, and was also part of the duo Sheila & Ringo with her husband singer Ringo. She also fronted a disco act called Sheila and B. Devotion. Her stage name came from the title of her first release, a French cover version of "Sheila", a hit by Tommy Roe.

Throughout her career, Sheila has sold more than 85 million records worldwide.

== Career ==
Sheila started her musical career in 1962, after being noticed by Claude Carrère, a French record producer and songwriter. Her parents signed a contract with Carrère for her, when she was 16; the contract led to an artistic collaboration which lasted for more than 20 years. In 1995, a lawsuit put an end to this life-time deal. She entered into a long royalties battle against her former producer, which she won.

Sheila had numerous hits in the 1960s, 1970s and 1980s, playing the typical 'girl next door'. Her first hit was "L'école est finie" ("School is over"), in 1962 (1 million copies). It reached the #1 position in France. In 1964, she recorded and released "Vous Les Copains, Je Ne Vous Oublierai Jamais", her French adaptation of the international hit, "Do Wah Diddy Diddy" as popularized by Manfred Mann, also charted. Notably, the original pop song was sung by The Exciters from a year earlier in 1963.

In the movie, Eight Women, Ludivine Sagnier sang her 1963 hit "Papa t'es plus dans l'coup" ("Daddy, you are not in on it anymore"). Sheila's music also featured in the 1996 François Ozon film Une robe d'été (A Summer Dress). The character Sébastien is a fan of Sheila, and Sheila's version of Cher's "Bang Bang (My Baby Shot Me Down)" was on the soundtrack. "Les rois mages" also featured in "Ma vie en rose", a 1997 gender-bender film, "Love me baby", in 1978, "Attention les enfants regardent", with Alain Delon, "Spacer" in "Podium" (2004). In 1975, she sang the disco hit Les ordres du docteur, which was a localized version of Doctor's Orders.

After more than a decade of targeting the French teen music audience, mainly in French but also in Spanish, German and Italian, Sheila made a change in her career by releasing "Les Femmes (Qu'y a-t-il dans le cœur des femmes)", a song by Christine Charbonneau in 1976. "Les Femmes" climbed to number one and stayed in the chart for three months. "Les Femmes" brought to Sheila a revolution of modernity, making her one of the idols of the French pop music.

In 1977, she started singing in English as Sheila and B. Devotion (in some countries records were under the name "Sheila B. Devotion") and changed her style to disco music. Sheila was accompanied by three male dancers who made up the "Black Devotion" in her routine. She enjoyed international success with hits such as "Singin' in the Rain", "Love Me Baby", "You Light my Fire" and "Spacer" (from the album King of the World, produced by Chic). "Spacer" is one of her biggest hits with more than 5 million copies sold worldwide. According to different interviews, she often said her experience with Chic completely changed her way of working and singing. It was the beginning of a deep artistic disagreement with her French manager Carrère, which made Sheila leave France, move to New York "to start all over again" and studied at the Actors Studio.

After her disco period, in 1981, Sheila (without the "B. Devotion" gimmick) recorded the pop rock album Little Darlin', produced by Keith Olsen, and was back in the U.S. Billboard chart. The title song became her only U.S. Billboard Hot 100 hit, reaching #49 in early 1982.

She put an end to her artistic collaboration with her manager Carrère at the beginning of the 1980s, then took a brand new musical direction in 1983 when she met Yves Martin, a composer and producer who later became her husband. She recorded three albums under his direction between 1983 and 1988, and her new songs were critically acclaimed ("Tangue au", "Emmenez-moi", "Je suis comme toi", "Pour te retrouver", 'Le Tam-Tam du vent"...). Becoming disillusioned with the music business and record industry, she abandoned her music career between 1989 and 1998. During this break, she wrote three successful books, had her own regular TV show, played in a TV series and started making sculptures.

However Sheila had a successful comeback in music in 1998 with a new CD compiling re-recordings of some of her hits, along with new songs. It went gold within one month. Thanks to this unexpected success, another studio album called Dense was released a year later with brand new songs.

Sheila is still widely popular today, performing concerts in 1998 and 2002 at the Olympia, in 2006 at the Cabaret Sauvage with an unplugged concert or on tour with "La Tournée des Idoles" in 2009 and 2010. In 2005 she signed a deal with Warner Music France after many years of negotiation. All of her recordings, including her self-produced albums, can now be released on CD under the same label. Following this agreement, her complete recordings were issued in an 18 CD box set in 2006. It included more than 400 songs, unknown recordings, demos, alternative takes, duets, TV performances and German, Italian, Spanish and English versions of her hits.

In 2007, Warner Music France decided to release separately each of her albums on CD with its original artwork and bonus tracks. Most of them are also re-issued on vinyl LP format.

Her album Little Darlin' was remastered and released in Japan in January 2011 on SHM-CD. This reissue is the replica of the original LP with its Japanese cover. The pictures and artwork are completely different from other international pressings. It also contains the title "Prisoner" as on the first Japanese release in 1981 (it remained unknown on other markets until 1996).

She was one of the contestants during the Second season of Danse avec les stars (Dancing with the Stars).

Sheila celebrated her 50 years in the music industry with a show at the Paris Olympia music hall in September 2012. A brand new album "Solide" with 10 new songs was released in November 2012. In February 2013 she received a "Victoire de la Musique" award celebrating her 50-year career anniversary.

Late 2019, Sheila took part in the French version of the famous Masked Singer TV franchise, under the Squirrel costume. She was eliminated in the second episode, and unmasked to overall surprise since none of the show's panelists guessed her successfully.

== Personal life ==
She married French singer Guy Bayle known by the name Ringo or Ringo Willy Cat on 13 February 1973 in Paris at the church Notre-Dame de la Gare. The two also formed a musical duo Sheila & Ringo most famous for their hit "Les Gondoles à Venise".

In 1975, she gave birth to a son, Ludovic, who died of an overdose in 2017. She described him as "the love of my life".
