= Lists of number-one songs =

The following articles contain lists of number-one hits:

- List of Billboard number-one singles
- Lists of UK Singles Chart number ones
- List of number-one singles in Australia
- List of number-one singles in Canada
- List of number-one singles in France
- List of number-one hits (Germany)
- List of songs that reached number one on the Irish Singles Chart
- List of number-one hits (Italy)
- List of number-one songs in Norway
- List of number-one hits (Spain)
- List of number-one singles in Switzerland
- List of number-one singles in the Dutch Top 40
- List of number-one singles and albums in Sweden
- List of number-one singles (Finland)
- List of number-one hits (Belgium)
- List of number-one hits (Denmark)
- Lists of number-one singles (Austria)
- List of number-one songs (Slovakia)
- List of number-one songs (Czech Republic)
- List of Oricon number-one singles
- List of number-one singles in Poland
- List of number-one singles (Romania)

== Other ==
- Lists of UK Dance Singles Chart number ones
- Lists of UK Independent Singles Chart number ones
- List of Billboard number-one alternative hits
- List of Billboard number-one dance hits
- Lists of number-one Billboard Hot Latin Songs
- List of Billboard number-one rhythm and blues hits

== See also ==
- Lists of number-one albums
