= List of top 10 singles for 1995 in Australia =

This is a list of singles that charted in the top ten of the ARIA Charts in 1995.

== Top-ten singles ==
Key

Symbol	Meaning
◁	Indicates single's top 10 entry was also its ARIA top 50 debut
(#)	1995 Year-end top 10 single position and rank

List of ARIA top ten singles that peaked in 1995
Top ten entry date	Single	Artist(s)	Peak	Peak date	Weeks in top ten	References
Singles from 1994
5 December	"Short Dick Man" ◁	20 Fingers featuring Gillette	4	9 January	9	
19 December	"On Bended Knee"	Boyz II Men	7	2 January	6	
Singles from 1995
2 January	"Stay Another Day"	East 17	3	16 January	8	
16 January	"Here Comes the Hotstepper"	Ini Kamoze	2	13 February	12	
16 January	"Another Night" (#5)	Real McCoy	1	6 February	15	
23 January	"Pure Massacre" ◁	Silverchair	2	23 January	8	
30 January	"Self Esteem"	The Offspring	6	13 February	7	
30 January	"Hot Hot Hot"	Arrow	9	6 February	5	
6 February	"Beautiful in My Eyes"	Joshua Kadison	5	20 February	6	
13 February	"A Girl Like You"	Edwyn Collins	6	13 March	7	
20 February	"Here's Johnny!"	Hocus Pocus	1	20 March	12	
20 February	"Total Eclipse of the Heart"	Nicki French	2	27 March	12	
13 March	"Ode to My Family"	The Cranberries	5	13 March	5	
13 March	"Think Twice"	Celine Dion	2	17 April	11	
20 March	"Sorrento Moon (I Remember)"	Tina Arena	7	27 March	5	
20 March	"Sky High"	Newton	8	27 March	3	
20 March	"Someday I'll Be Saturday Night"	Bon Jovi	10	20 March	1	
27 March	"When I Come Around"	Green Day	7	3 April	3	
3 April	"Bedtime Story" ◁	Madonna	5	3 April	4	
10 April	"Sukiyaki"	4 P.M.	3	1 May	10	
10 April	"Cotton Eye Joe"	Rednex	8	10 April	6	
17 April	"Back for Good" (#9)	Take That	1	1 May	13	
17 April	"Run Away"	Real McCoy	4	1 May	8	
24 April	"Mouth" (#4)	Merril Bainbridge	1	15 May	14	
1 May	"Everybody on the Floor (Pump It)"	Tokyo Ghetto Pussy	6	8 May	5	
1 May	"Strong Enough"	Sheryl Crow	3	22 May	10	
15 May	"You Belong to Me"	JX	4	29 May	9	
15 May	"I've Got a Little Something for You"	MN8	7	29 May	6	
22 May	"Have You Ever Really Loved a Woman?" (#6) ◁	Bryan Adams	1	26 June	14	
22 May	"Baby Baby"	Corona	7	5 June	6	
5 June	"Scream" ◁	Michael Jackson and Janet Jackson	2	5 June	5	
12 June	"This Ain't a Love Song" ◁	Bon Jovi	4	12 June	7	
12 June	"Shy Guy"	Diana King	3	10 July	9	
3 July	"Hold Me, Thrill Me, Kiss Me, Kill Me" ◁	U2	1	3 July	8	
10 July	"Don't Stop (Wiggle Wiggle)"	The Outhere Brothers	5	31 July	5	
10 July	"My Love Is for Real"	Paula Abdul featuring Ofra Haza	7	10 July	3	
10 July	"This Is a Call"	Foo Fighters	9	10 July	1	
17 July	"Love & Devotion"	Real McCoy	7	24 July	4	
17 July	"Insensitive"	Jann Arden	1	14 August	12	
17 July	"This Is How We Do It"	Montell Jordan	7	31 July	3	
31 July	"Somebody's Crying"	Chris Isaak	5	7 August	7	
31 July	"U Sure Do"	Strike	9	31 July	1	
31 July	"Let Her Cry"	Hootie & the Blowfish	4	7 August	7	
7 August	"Kiss from a Rose" (#3)	Seal	1	21 August	14	
7 August	"Alice, Who the F**k Is Alice?"	The Steppers	2	4 September	11	
14 August	"Excalibur"	F.C.B.	2	14 August	7	
14 August	"Under the Water"	Merril Bainbridge	4	21 August	8	
14 August	"You Are Not Alone" (#10) ◁	Michael Jackson	7	11 September	13	
28 August	"You Oughta Know"	Alanis Morissette	4	2 October	10	
28 August	"Try Me Out"	Corona	10	28 August	1	
4 September	"Right Type of Mood"	Herbie	10	4 September	2	
18 September	"Fantasy" ◁	Mariah Carey	1	2 October	6	
18 September	"Stayin' Alive" (#2) ◁	N-Trance featuring Ricardo da Force	1	9 October	17	
18 September	"Scatman (Ski-Ba-Bop-Ba-Dop-Bop)"	Scatman John	8	2 October	4	
2 October	"Gangsta's Paradise" (#1) ◁	Coolio featuring L.V.	1	16 October	17	
9 October	"Where the Wild Roses Grow" ◁	Nick Cave and the Bad Seeds and Kylie Minogue	2	9 October	5	
9 October	"Waterfalls"	TLC	4	30 October	11	
9 October	"Mysterious Girl"	Peter Andre featuring Bubbler Ranx	8	9 October	5	
9 October	"Runaway"	Janet Jackson	8	6 November	5	
23 October	"Let's Groove" (#8) ◁	CDB	2	20 November	15	
30 October	"I'd Lie for You (And That's the Truth)" ◁	Meat Loaf	7	6 November	4	
13 November	"It's Alright"	Deni Hines	4	4 December	10	
13 November	"As I Lay Me Down"	Sophie B. Hawkins	7	13 November	2	
27 November	"Fairground"	Simply Red	7	27 November	5	
27 November	"I Kiss Your Lips"	Tokyo Ghetto Pussy	8	27 November	1	
27 November	"You'll See"	Madonna	9	27 November	3	
4 December	"Miss Sarajevo" ◁	Passengers	7	4 December	6	
11 December	"I Got Id" ◁	Pearl Jam	2	11 December	5	
11 December	"Free as a Bird" ◁	The Beatles	6	11 December	1	

=== 1994 peaks ===
List of ARIA top ten singles in 1995 that peaked in 1994
Top ten entry date	Single	Artist(s)	Peak	Peak date	Weeks in top ten	References
3 October	"Always"	Bon Jovi	2	17 October	16	
3 October	"Tomorrow"	Silverchair	1	24 October	20	
31 October	"Come Out and Play"	The Offspring	8	28 November	13	
7 November	"All I Wanna Do"	Sheryl Crow	1	5 December	12	
21 November	"Zombie" (#7)	The Cranberries	1	12 December	16	
5 December	"If I Only Knew" ◁	Tom Jones	5	5 December	6	
5 December	"Turn the Beat Around"	Gloria Estefan	8	19 December	6	

=== 1996 peaks ===
List of ARIA top ten singles in 1995 that peaked in 1996
Top ten entry date	Single	Artist(s)	Peak	Peak date	Weeks in top ten	References
6 November	"Boom Boom Boom"	The Outhere Brothers	2	8 January	14	
27 November	"One Sweet Day"	Mariah Carey and Boyz II Men	2	15 January	12	
