= List of top 10 singles for 1989 in Australia =

This is a list of singles that charted in the top ten of the ARIA Charts in 1989.

== Top-ten singles ==
Key

Symbol	Meaning
◁	Indicates single's top 10 entry was also its ARIA top 50 debut
(#)	1989 Year-end top 10 single position and rank

List of ARIA top ten singles that peaked in 1989
Top ten entry date	Single	Artist(s)	Peak	Peak date	Weeks in top ten	References
Singles from 1988
5 December	"Kokomo"	The Beach Boys	1	2 January	15	
19 December	"Handle with Care"	Traveling Wilburys	3	9 January	11	
Singles from 1989
2 January	"Especially for You" ◁	Kylie Minogue and Jason Donovan	2	2 January	7	
2 January	"Teardrops"	Womack & Womack	2	30 January	12	
9 January	"Rock and Roll Music"	Mental As Anything	5	30 January	8	
9 January	"Put a Little Love in Your Heart"	Annie Lennox and Al Green	6	16 January	2	
16 January	"I'm Gonna Be (500 Miles)" (#3)	The Proclaimers	1	13 February	15	
23 January	"She Makes My Day"	Robert Palmer	9	23 January	2	
30 January	"You Got It"	Roy Orbison	3	27 February	11	
30 January	"Tucker's Daughter"	Ian Moss	2	27 February	12	
6 February	"Orinoco Flow"	Enya	6	13 February	5	
6 February	"Kiss"	Art of Noise featuring Tom Jones	8	20 February	6	
27 February	"She Drives Me Crazy"	Fine Young Cannibals	1	27 March	13	
13 March	"Like a Prayer" (#1) ◁	Madonna	1	20 March	13	
13 March	"The Living Years"	Mike and the Mechanics	1	8 May	13	
13 March	"Soul Revival"	Johnny Diesel and the Injectors	9	13 March	5	
20 March	"Too Many Broken Hearts" ◁	Jason Donovan	7	20 March	5	
20 March	"I'm on My Way"	The Proclaimers	3	10 April	8	
27 March	"Stop!"	Sam Brown	4	8 May	10	
17 April	"One Summer"	Daryl Braithwaite	8	17 April	3	
17 April	"Lost in Your Eyes"	Debbie Gibson	7	1 May	8	
24 April	"Ring My Bell"	Collette	5	8 May	6	
24 April	"Chained to the Wheel"	The Black Sorrows	9	1 May	3	
1 May	"Stuck on You"	Paul Norton	3	15 May	6	
8 May	"Eternal Flame" (#4)	Bangles	1	22 May	14	
15 May	"Wind Beneath My Wings"	Bette Midler	1	29 May	12	
15 May	"Cry in Shame"	Johnny Diesel and the Injectors	10	15 May	1	
22 May	"Now You're in Heaven"	Julian Lennon	5	29 May	4	
29 May	"Bedroom Eyes"	Kate Ceberano	2	29 May	12	
29 May	"Hand on Your Heart" ◁	Kylie Minogue	4	29 May	7	
5 June	"The Look" (#2)	Roxette	1	26 June	13	
12 June	"Express Yourself"	Madonna	5	26 June	9	
12 June	"Good Thing"	Fine Young Cannibals	7	12 June	4	
12 June	"Pop Singer"	John Cougar Mellencamp	8	19 June	3	
19 June	"Iko Iko"	The Belle Stars	7	26 June	5	
19 June	"I Want It All"	Queen	10	19 June	1	
26 June	"Sealed with a Kiss"	Jason Donovan	8	26 June	3	
3 July	"You Got It (The Right Stuff)"	New Kids on the Block	1	7 August	10	
10 July	"Batdance"	Prince	2	21 August	10	
17 July	"Baby I Don't Care"	Transvision Vamp	3	21 August	9	
17 July	"If You Don't Know Me by Now"	Simply Red	1	28 August	10	
24 July	"Say Goodbye"	Indecent Obsession	6	7 August	3	
7 August	"Funky Cold Medina"	Tone Loc	8	21 August	4	
14 August	"I Don't Want a Lover"	Texas	4	11 September	6	
14 August	"Telephone Booth"	Ian Moss	7	14 August	1	
14 August	"Dressed for Success"	Roxette	3	4 September	10	
21 August	"I'll Be Loving You (Forever)"	New Kids on the Block	4	4 September	6	
21 August	"Right Back Where We Started From"	Sinitta	7	28 August	5	
4 September	"Right Here Waiting"	Richard Marx	1	4 September	10	
4 September	"Wouldn't Change a Thing" ◁	Kylie Minogue	6	18 September	3	
11 September	"All I Want Is You"	U2	2	18 September	8	
18 September	"Way of the World"	Max Q	8	25 September	3	
18 September	"Toy Soldiers"	Martika	5	25 September	9	
25 September	"Cherish"	Madonna	4	25 September	4	
25 September	"If I Could Turn Back Time" (#5)	Cher	1	9 October	18	
25 September	"Talk It Over"	Grayson Hugh	4	6 November	9	
25 September	"Poison"	Alice Cooper	3	23 October	15	
2 October	"Swing the Mood" ◁	Jive Bunny and the Mastermixers	1	16 October	15	
9 October	"The Best"	Tina Turner	4	23 October	7	
16 October	"She Has to Be Loved"	Jenny Morris	5	13 November	8	
30 October	"We Didn't Start the Fire"	Billy Joel	2	27 November	12	
6 November	"Listen to Your Heart"	Roxette	10	6 November	5	
13 November	"Hangin' Tough"	New Kids on the Block	8	13 November	2	
20 November	"Every Little Step"	Bobby Brown	8	27 November	6	
27 November	"That's What I Like" ◁	Jive Bunny and the Mastermixers	4	27 November	7	

=== 1988 peaks ===
List of ARIA top ten singles in 1989 that peaked in 1988
Top ten entry date	Single	Artist(s)	Peak	Peak date	Weeks in top ten	References
17 October	"The Only Way Is Up"	Yazz & the Plastic Population	2	24 October	15	
17 October	"A Groovy Kind of Love"	Phil Collins	2	31 October	13	
24 October	"Don't Worry, Be Happy" ◁	Bobby McFerrin	1	7 November	13	
31 October	"Nothing Can Divide Us" ◁	Jason Donovan	3	21 November	10	
14 November	"I Want Your Love"	Transvision Vamp	7	12 December	9	
28 November	"If I Could"	1927	4	19 December	13	

=== 1990 peaks ===
List of ARIA top ten singles in 1989 that peaked in 1990
Top ten entry date	Single	Artist(s)	Peak	Peak date	Weeks in top ten	References
13 November	"I Feel the Earth Move"	Martika	2	8 January	12	
27 November	"Love Shack"	The B-52s	1	1 January	13	
4 December	"Leave a Light On"	Belinda Carlisle	5	15 January	9	
