= List of top 10 singles for 2002 in Australia =

This is a list of singles that charted in the top ten of the ARIA Charts in 2002.

== Top-ten singles ==
Key

Symbol	Meaning
◁	Indicates single's top 10 entry was also its ARIA top 50 debut
(#)	2002 Year-end top 10 single position and rank

List of ARIA top ten singles that peaked in 2002
Top ten entry date	Single	Artist(s)	Peak	Peak date	Weeks in top ten	References
Singles from 2001
29 October	"I'm Real" ◁	Jennifer Lopez featuring Ja Rule	3	7 January	10	
3 December	"Hero" (#9)	Enrique Iglesias	1	14 January	13	
17 December	"Rapture"	iiO	3	14 January	6	
24 December	"Better Man"	Robbie Williams	6	14 January	9	
31 December	"U Got It Bad"	Usher	3	28 January	10	
31 December	"Family Affair"	Mary J. Blige	8	7 January	3	
Singles from 2002
7 January	"In the End"	Linkin Park	4	4 February	7	
14 January	"Hey Baby"	No Doubt featuring Bounty Killer	7	14 January	3	
21 January	"Insatiable" ◁	Darren Hayes	3	21 January	6	
21 January	"Cherry Lips" ◁	Garbage	7	21 January	5	
21 January	"Livin' It Up"	Ja Rule featuring Case	6	4 March	9	
28 January	"In Your Eyes" ◁	Kylie Minogue	1	28 January	2	
4 February	"Whenever, Wherever" (#2) ◁	Shakira	1	4 February	16	
4 February	"The Greatest View" ◁	Silverchair	3	4 February	1	
4 February	"Hands Clean" ◁	Alanis Morissette	9	4 February	1	
4 February	"Somethin' Stupid" ◁	Robbie Williams and Nicole Kidman	8	18 February	4	
11 February	"Superman (It's Not Easy)" ◁	Five for Fighting	2	25 February	8	
18 February	"Murder on the Dancefloor" ◁	Sophie Ellis-Bextor	3	18 February	16	
18 February	"Not Pretty Enough" (#7)	Kasey Chambers	1	18 March	13	
25 February	"Dance with Me"	112	2	25 March	7	
11 March	"Stop Calling Me"	Shakaya	5	1 April	6	
11 March	"What About Us?"	Brandy	6	18 March	4	
11 March	"Gotta Get Thru This"	Daniel Bedingfield	10	11 March	1	
18 March	"Hey Baby (Uhh, Ahh)"	DJ Ötzi	1	15 April	12	
25 March	"Freeek!" ◁	George Michael	5	25 March	1	
1 April	"Superstition"	Popstars 3 - The Final 7	7	1 April	1	
8 April	"Always on Time" ◁	Ja Rule featuring Ashanti	3	22 April	5	
8 April	"I'm Not a Girl, Not Yet a Woman" ◁	Britney Spears	7	8 April	3	
8 April	"Way Love's Supposed to Be" ◁	Selwyn	9	8 April	1	
8 April	"Don't Let Me Get Me" ◁	Pink	8	15 April	3	
15 April	"One Day in Your Life"	Anastacia	6	15 April	3	
15 April	"Wherever You Will Go"	The Calling	5	29 April	7	
15 April	"Escape"	Enrique Iglesias	7	6 May	3	
22 April	"Girlfriend (remix)" ◁	NSYNC featuring Nelly	2	22 April	8	
22 April	"Ain't It Funny"	Jennifer Lopez featuring Ja Rule	9	22 April	2	
6 May	"Underneath Your Clothes" ◁	Shakira	1	20 May	11	
13 May	"I'm Moving On" ◁	Scott Cain	1	13 May	4	
13 May	"What's Luv?" ◁	Fat Joe featuring Ashanti	4	3 June	6	
13 May	"If Tomorrow Never Comes"	Ronan Keating	3	27 May	9	
20 May	"Without You" ◁	Silverchair	8	20 May	1	
20 May	"U-Turn" ◁	Usher	7	3 June	2	
27 May	"Without Me" (#1) ◁	Eminem	1	27 May	12	
27 May	"Foolish" ◁	Ashanti	6	8 July	8	
27 May	"Nasty Girl" ◁	Destiny's Child	10	27 May	1	
3 June	"Hella Good"	No Doubt	8	3 June	2	
3 June	"Beautiful"	Disco Montego featuring Katie Underwood	9	3 June	1	
10 June	"Kiss Kiss" (#10) ◁	Holly Valance	1	10 June	9	
10 June	"Love at First Sight" ◁	Kylie Minogue	3	10 June	3	
10 June	"Wish I Didn't Miss You" ◁	Angie Stone	7	10 June	1	
17 June	"Hot in Herre" ◁	Nelly	3	22 July	11	
17 June	"Creepin' Up Slowly" ◁	Taxiride	6	2 September	5	
17 June	"When You Look at Me"	Christina Milian	7	15 July	3	
24 June	"A Little Less Conversation" (#3) ◁	Elvis vs. JXL	1	24 June	11	
24 June	"I Need a Girl (Part One)" ◁	P. Diddy featuring Usher and Loon	5	8 July	6	
24 June	"A Thousand Miles" (#6)	Vanessa Carlton	1	5 August	14	
1 July	"By the Way" ◁	Red Hot Chili Peppers	6	1 July	2	
15 July	"Get Over You"	Sophie Ellis-Bextor	4	29 July	8	
22 July	"Heaven"	DJ Sammy and Yanou featuring Do	4	12 August	9	
22 July	"Tribute"	Tenacious D	4	2 September	13	
29 July	"Complicated" (#8)	Avril Lavigne	1	19 August	10	
12 August	"Don't Turn Off the Lights"	Enrique Iglesias	8	19 August	3	
19 August	"Papa Don't Preach" ◁	Kelly Osbourne	3	19 August	4	
26 August	"Way of the World" ◁	Francesca (Belperio)	3	26 August	1	
2 September	"Two Wrongs"	Wyclef Jean featuring Claudette Ortiz	5	7 October	7	
2 September	"Just a Little"	Liberty X	4	23 September	8	
9 September	"Objection (Tango)" ◁	Shakira	2	9 September	6	
9 September	"The Logical Song"	Scooter	1	30 September	9	
9 September	"Rich Girl"	Selwyn	9	23 September	4	
16 September	"Everyday" ◁	Bon Jovi	5	16 September	2	
23 September	"Symphony of Life" ◁	Tina Arena	8	23 September	1	
30 September	"Cleanin' Out My Closet" ◁	Eminem	3	30 September	6	
30 September	"Gangsta Lovin'" ◁	Eve featuring Alicia Keys	4	30 September	6	
30 September	"BareNaked"	Jennifer Love Hewitt	6	7 October	4	
7 October	"Down Boy" ◁	Holly Valance	3	14 October	4	
14 October	"The Ketchup Song (Aserejé)" (#5) ◁	Las Ketchup	1	14 October	17	
21 October	"Dilemma" (#4) ◁	Nelly featuring Kelly Rowland	1	21 October	14	
21 October	"The Tide Is High (Get the Feeling)" ◁	Atomic Kitten	4	21 October	12	
21 October	"Like I Love You" ◁	Justin Timberlake	8	4 November	6	
28 October	"Electrical Storm" ◁	U2	5	28 October	1	
28 October	"Dirrty" ◁	Christina Aguilera featuring Redman	4	25 November	8	
28 October	"Life Goes On"	LeAnn Rimes	7	18 November	8	
4 November	"Sk8er Boi" ◁	Avril Lavigne	3	4 November	8	
4 November	"Inside Outside" ◁	Sophie Monk	5	4 November	2	
4 November	"All Seats Taken"	Bec Cartwright	10	4 November	1	
11 November	"Come Into My World" ◁	Kylie Minogue	4	11 November	1	
11 November	"Die Another Day" ◁	Madonna	5	11 November	1	
18 November	"Born to Try" ◁	Delta Goodrem	1	2 December	15	
18 November	"Boys of Summer"	DJ Sammy	9	18 November	2	
25 November	"Jenny from the Block" ◁	Jennifer Lopez featuring Jadakiss and Styles	5	30 December	8	
2 December	"Do It with Madonna"	The Androids	4	16 December	7	
9 December	"Lose Yourself" ◁	Eminem	1	9 December	14	
23 December	"Feel"	Robbie Williams	10	23 December	1	
30 December	"What's Your Flava?"	Craig David	10	30 December	1	

=== 2001 peaks ===
List of ARIA top ten singles in 2002 that peaked in 2001
Top ten entry date	Single	Artist(s)	Peak	Peak date	Weeks in top ten	References
22 October	"Smooth Criminal" ◁	Alien Ant Farm	1	5 November	12	
17 December	"Get the Party Started" ◁	Pink	1	31 December	10	

=== 2003 peaks ===
List of ARIA top ten singles in 2002 that peaked in 2003
Top ten entry date	Single	Artist(s)	Peak	Peak date	Weeks in top ten	References
23 December	"Stole"	Kelly Rowland	2	20 January	10	
