= Excalibur (song) =

- Australia & New Zealand cover art

Single by F.C.B.
- Released: 1995
- Studio: Cristofori's Studio, Roma Italy
- Length: 3:57
- Songwriters: Carlo Favilli, Maurizio Cristofori
- Producers: Maurizio Cristofori, Carlo Favilli

"Excalibur" is a song by the Italian group F.C.B. (Favilli Cristofori Bresil). Released in 1995, the song reached number two on the ARIA chart and was certified Gold.[1]

== Track listings ==
1. "Excalibur" (Radio Mix) - 3:57
2. "Excalibur" (Skitz Mix) - 6:24
3. "Excalibur" (Templar) - 5:30
4. "Merlinmelodic Song" - 5:17

== Charts ==
=== Weekly charts ===
Chart (1995)	Peak position
Australia (ARIA)	2

=== Year-end charts ===
Chart (1995)	Rank
Australia (ARIA Charts)	30

== Certifications ==
Region	Certification	Certified units/sales
Australia (ARIA)	Gold	35,000^{^}
^{^} Shipments figures based on certification alone.
