= List of top 10 singles for 1998 in Australia =

This is a list of singles that charted in the top ten of the ARIA Charts in 1998.

== Top-ten singles ==
Key

| Symbol | Meaning |
|---|---|
| ◁ | Indicates single's top 10 entry was also its ARIA top 50 debut |
| (#) | 1998 Year-end top 10 single position and rank |

List of ARIA top ten singles that peaked in 1998
| Top ten entry date | Single | Artist(s) | Peak | Peak date | Weeks in top ten | References |
Singles from 1997
| 15 December | "As Long as You Love Me" | Backstreet Boys | 2 | 12 January | 12 | |
| 15 December | "You Sexy Thing" | T-Shirt | 6 | 5 January | 14 | |
| 29 December | "Together Again" | Janet Jackson | 4 | 12 January | 12 | |
Singles from 1998
| 5 January | "Walkin' on the Sun" | Smash Mouth | 7 | 9 February | 6 | |
| 12 January | "My Heart Will Go On" | Celine Dion | 1 | 9 February | 16 | |
| 12 January | "Torn" | Natalie Imbruglia | 2 | 23 February | 11 | |
| 2 February | "It's Like That" (#2) | Run-DMC vs. Jason Nevins | 1 | 9 March | 14 | |
| 23 February | "Frozen" ◁ | Madonna | 5 | 23 February | 7 | |
| 23 February | "Too Much" | Spice Girls | 9 | 23 February | 1 | |
| 23 February | "Pash" | Kate Ceberano | 10 | 23 February | 1 | |
| 2 March | "Never Ever" (#5) | All Saints | 1 | 16 March | 15 | |
| 2 March | "Lollipop (Candyman)" | Aqua | 3 | 9 March | 10 | |
| 9 March | "All I Have to Give" | Backstreet Boys | 4 | 23 March | 10 | |
| 9 March | "Gettin' Jiggy wit It" | Will Smith | 6 | 23 March | 6 | |
| 9 March | "Cherish" | Pappa Bear featuring Van Der Toorn | 7 | 23 March | 8 | |
| 23 March | "The Unforgiven II" | Metallica | 9 | 23 March | 4 | |
| 23 March | "I Wanna Be the Only One" | Eternal featuring BeBe Winans | 10 | 23 March | 1 | |
| 30 March | "You're Still the One" (#9) | Shania Twain | 1 | 4 May | 15 | |
| 30 March | "You Make Me Wanna..." | Usher | 6 | 20 April | 8 | |
| 20 April | "Second Solution / Prisoner of Society" (#6) | The Living End | 4 | 18 May | 14 | |
| 27 April | "5, 6, 7, 8" | Steps | 1 | 1 June | 10 | |
| 4 May | "All My Life" | K-Ci & JoJo | 1 | 8 June | 14 | |
| 11 May | "Big Mistake" | Natalie Imbruglia | 6 | 8 June | 6 | |
| 11 May | "Stop" | Spice Girls | 5 | 1 June | 10 | |
| 18 May | "Ray of Light" ◁ | Madonna | 6 | 18 May | 4 | |
| 25 May | "Thinking of You" | Hanson | 6 | 25 May | 2 | |
| 1 June | "Sex and Candy" | Marcy Playground | 8 | 15 June | 3 | |
| 8 June | "The Cup of Life"/"Maria" (#1) | Ricky Martin | 1 | 15 June | 11 | |
| 15 June | "The Boy Is Mine" | Brandy and Monica | 3 | 29 June | 11 | |
| 15 June | "Iris" (#3) | Goo Goo Dolls | 1 | 27 July | 18 | |
| 22 June | "Fuel" ◁ | Metallica | 2 | 22 June | 3 | |
| 22 June | "Ghetto Supastar (That Is What You Are)" ◁ | Pras Michel featuring ODB and Introducing Mya | 2 | 3 August | 13 | |
| 22 June | "High" | Lighthouse Family | 1 | 31 August | 17 | |
| 6 July | "Last Thing on My Mind" | Steps | 5 | 17 August | 12 | |
| 13 July | "Crush on You" | Aaron Carter | 9 | 13 July | 1 | |
| 13 July | "This Is How We Party" | S.O.A.P. | 7 | 17 August | 10 | |
| 20 July | "When the Lights Go Out" ◁ | Five | 2 | 24 August | 12 | |
| 27 July | "Come with Me" | Puff Daddy featuring Jimmy Page | 10 | 27 July | 1 | |
| 3 August | "C'est la Vie" | B*Witched | 6 | 28 September | 6 | |
| 10 August | "Turn Back Time" | Aqua | 10 | 10 August | 1 | |
| 17 August | "Buses and Trains" | Bachelor Girl | 4 | 24 August | 6 | |
| 24 August | "I Don't Want to Miss a Thing" (#4) | Aerosmith | 1 | 7 September | 16 | |
| 31 August | "Viva Forever" ◁ | Spice Girls | 2 | 14 September | 11 | |
| 31 August | "The Things I Love in You" ◁ | Cold Chisel | 10 | 31 August | 1 | |
| 7 September | "Redundant"/"Good Riddance (Time of Your Life)" (#8) | Green Day | 2 | 28 September | 17 | |
| 7 September | "I'll Never Break Your Heart" | Backstreet Boys | 10 | 7 September | 1 | |
| 21 September | "From This Moment On" (#10) | Shania Twain | 2 | 2 November | 18 | |
| 28 September | "Under the Bridge" | All Saints | 5 | 12 October | 6 | |
| 5 October | "Life" | Des'ree | 8 | 5 October | 1 | |
| 5 October | "I Don't Like It" | Pauline Pantsdown | 10 | 5 October | 1 | |
| 12 October | "Crush" (#7) | Jennifer Paige | 1 | 23 November | 15 | |
| 12 October | "Everybody Get Up" | Five | 5 | 26 October | 11 | |
| 12 October | "Music Sounds Better with You" | Stardust | 4 | 19 October | 6 | |
| 19 October | "Rollercoaster" | B*Witched | 1 | 9 November | 11 | |
| 19 October | "Sway" | Bic Runga | 10 | 19 October | 1 | |
| 26 October | "Sweetest Thing" ◁ | U2 | 6 | 2 November | 4 | |
| 9 November | "Finally Found" | Honeyz | 3 | 7 December | 12 | |
| 16 November | "If You Could Read My Mind" | Stars on 54 | 3 | 23 November | 8 | |
| 23 November | "Pretty Fly (For a White Guy)" | The Offspring | 1 | 7 December | 14 | |

=== 1997 peaks ===
List of ARIA top ten singles in 1998 that peaked in 1997
| Top ten entry date | Single | Artist(s) | Peak | Peak date | Weeks in top ten | References |
|---|---|---|---|---|---|---|
| 3 November | "Tubthumping" ◁ | Chumbawamba | 1 | 1 December | 16 | |
| 10 November | "I Will Come to You" ◁ | Hanson | 2 | 8 December | 11 | |
| 10 November | "Da Ya Think I'm Sexy?" | N-Trance featuring Rod Stewart | 3 | 1 December | 15 | |
| 17 November | "Coco Jamboo" | Mr. President | 7 | 1 December | 10 | |
| 1 December | "Push" | Matchbox 20 | 8 | 1 December | 6 | |
| 8 December | "Doctor Jones" ◁ | Aqua | 1 | 22 December | 13 | |

=== 1999 peaks ===
List of ARIA top ten singles in 1998 that peaked in 1999
| Top ten entry date | Single | Artist(s) | Peak | Peak date | Weeks in top ten | References |
|---|---|---|---|---|---|---|
| 7 December | "Believe" | Cher | 1 | 18 January | 13 | |
| 14 December | "Goodbye" ◁ | Spice Girls | 3 | 11 January | 9 | |
| 28 December | "When You're Gone" | Bryan Adams featuring Melanie C | 4 | 18 January | 8 | |
| 28 December | "Jackie" | B.Z. featuring Joanne | 3 | 25 January | 11 | |
