= List of top 10 singles for 1991 in Australia =

This is a list of singles that charted in the top ten of the ARIA Charts in 1991.

== Top-ten singles ==
Key

Symbol	Meaning
◁	Indicates single's top 10 entry was also its ARIA top 50 debut
(#)	1991 Year-end top 10 single position and rank

List of ARIA top ten singles that peaked in 1991
Top ten entry date	Single	Artist(s)	Peak	Peak date	Weeks in top ten	References
Singles from 1990
26 November	"Ice Ice Baby"	Vanilla Ice	1	7 January	14	
10 December	"Cherry Pie"	Warrant	6	7 January	9	
Singles from 1991
7 January	"I'll Be Your Baby Tonight"	Robert Palmer and UB40	4	7 January	7	
7 January	"I Touch Myself"	Divinyls	1	28 January	10	
7 January	"From a Distance"	Bette Midler	8	7 January	2	
7 January	"Pray"	MC Hammer	7	28 January	5	
14 January	"Candy"	Iggy Pop	9	14 January	1	
21 January	"I've Been Thinking About You" (#8)	Londonbeat	1	11 February	11	
28 January	"Fantasy"	Black Box	3	11 February	9	
28 January	"I'm Free"	The Soup Dragons	9	4 February	4	
11 February	"Gonna Make You Sweat (Everybody Dance Now)"	C+C Music Factory featuring Freedom Williams	3	18 February	6	
11 February	"Wiggle It"	2 in a Room	3	4 March	6	
11 February	"That Ain't Bad" (#2)	Ratcat	1	29 April	14	
18 February	"Do the Bartman"	The Simpsons	1	11 March	10	
4 March	"Sadeness (Part I)"	Enigma	2	18 March	8	
4 March	"Because I Love You (The Postman Song)"	Stevie B	8	18 March	5	
4 March	"Sucker DJ (A Witch for Love)"	Dimples D	1	18 March	8	
18 March	"Falling (The Theme from Twin Peaks)"	Julee Cruise	1	1 April	7	
25 March	"Joyride" (#9)	Roxette	1	8 April	9	
25 March	"The Shoop Shoop Song (It's in His Kiss)" (#10)	Cher	4	15 April	10	
1 April	"The Horses" (#4)	Daryl Braithwaite	1	13 May	12	
8 April	"Crazy"	Seal	9	8 April	2	
8 April	"Better"	The Screaming Jets	4	29 April	10	
15 April	"Hold Me in Your Arms"	Southern Sons	9	29 April	3	
22 April	"Don't Go Now" ◁	Ratcat	1	27 May	8	
29 April	"Unbelievable"	EMF	8	29 April	6	
6 May	"How to Dance"	Bingoboys featuring Princessa	3	20 May	6	
6 May	"3 a.m. Eternal"	The KLF	3	27 May	8	
13 May	"Rhythm of My Heart"	Rod Stewart	2	3 June	9	
20 May	"Where the Streets Have No Name (I Can't Take My Eyes Off You)"	Pet Shop Boys	9	20 May	1	
27 May	"The Grease Megamix" (#3)	John Travolta and Olivia Newton-John	1	3 June	13	
27 May	"When Your Love Is Gone"	Jimmy Barnes	7	3 June	5	
3 June	"Rush Rush"	Paula Abdul	2	17 June	8	
10 June	"What Comes Naturally"	Sheena Easton	4	24 June	4	
17 June	"Baby Baby"	Amy Grant	5	24 June	5	
17 June	"Fading Like a Flower (Every Time You Leave)"	Roxette	7	17 June	3	
17 June	"Slave"	James Reyne	10	17 June	1	
24 June	"Read My Lips" (#6)	Melissa	1	8 July	11	
24 June	"Ring Ring Ring (Ha Ha Hey)"	De La Soul	4	1 July	7	
1 July	"Last Train to Trancentral"	The KLF	5	1 July	7	
1 July	"Shocked"	Kylie Minogue	7	1 July	1	
8 July	"You Could Be Mine" (#5) ◁	Guns N' Roses	3	22 July	13	
8 July	"Hot Chilli Woman"	Noiseworks	7	8 July	3	
8 July	"Love Rears Its Ugly Head"	Living Colour	10	8 July	2	
15 July	"(Everything I Do) I Do It for You" (#1) ◁	Bryan Adams	1	22 July	13	
22 July	"Things That Make You Go Hmmm..."	C+C Music Factory featuring Freedom Williams	6	5 August	7	
22 July	"Unforgettable" ◁	Natalie Cole with Nat King Cole	2	5 August	9	
29 July	"More Than Words" (#7)	Extreme	2	26 August	9	
29 July	"I Wanna Sex You Up"	Color Me Badd	4	19 August	7	
12 August	"It Ain't Over 'til It's Over"	Lenny Kravitz	10	12 August	2	
19 August	"Here I Am (Come and Take Me)"	UB40	3	9 September	9	
26 August	"Love... Thy Will Be Done"	Martika	1	7 October	10	
26 August	"Enter Sandman"	Metallica	10	26 August	2	
2 September	"Calling Elvis"	Dire Straits	8	2 September	1	
9 September	"Now That We Found Love"	Heavy D & the Boyz	6	16 September	5	
9 September	"Don't Cry" ◁	Guns N' Roses	5	16 September	4	
16 September	"Sexy (Is the Word)"	Melissa	3	30 September	6	
16 September	"Pump It (Nice an' Hard)"	Icy Blu	8	23 September	3	
23 September	"Wind of Change"	Scorpions	7	7 October	5	
30 September	"I've Got to Go Now"	Toni Childs	5	30 September	5	
30 September	"Rush"	Big Audio Dynamite II	1	14 October	8	
7 October	"Break in the Weather"	Jenny Morris	2	21 October	6	
14 October	"I Gotcha"	Jimmy Barnes	6	21 October	4	
14 October	"Gett Off"	Prince and the New Power Generation	8	21 October	2	
14 October	"Can't Stop This Thing We Started"	Bryan Adams	9	28 October	2	
21 October	"I'm Too Sexy"	Right Said Fred	1	4 November	14	
21 October	"Good Vibrations"	Marky Mark and the Funky Bunch featuring Loleatta Holloway	4	21 October	5	
21 October	"Just Like You"	Robbie Nevil	4	11 November	11	
28 October	"The Fly" ◁	U2	1	28 October	6	
4 November	"When Something Is Wrong with My Baby" ◁	Jimmy Barnes and John Farnham	3	4 November	10	
4 November	"Set Adrift on Memory Bliss"	P.M. Dawn	7	18 November	5	
11 November	"Black or White" ◁	Michael Jackson	1	25 November	15	
18 November	"All 4 Love"	Color Me Badd	9	25 November	5	
25 November	"The Unforgiven"	Metallica	10	25 November	3	
2 December	"Word Is Out"	Kylie Minogue	10	2 December	1	
9 December	"Mysterious Ways" ◁	U2	3	9 December	5	
9 December	"Stop the War in Croatia"	Tomislav Ivčić	7	9 December	4	
16 December	"Do Anything"	Natural Selection	10	16 December	1	

=== 1990 peaks ===
List of ARIA top ten singles in 1991 that peaked in 1990
Top ten entry date	Single	Artist(s)	Peak	Peak date	Weeks in top ten	References
12 November	"Unchained Melody"	The Righteous Brothers	1	19 November	15	
3 December	"Show Me Heaven"	Maria McKee	3	17 December	11	
3 December	"Burn for You"	John Farnham	5	17 December	6	
3 December	"Justify My Love"	Madonna	4	10 December	7	

=== 1992 peaks ===
List of ARIA top ten singles in 1991 that peaked in 1992
Top ten entry date	Single	Artist(s)	Peak	Peak date	Weeks in top ten	References
11 November	"Cream"	Prince and the New Power Generation	2	6 January	15	
25 November	"Let's Talk About Sex"	Salt-N-Pepa	1	20 January	15	
9 December	"Ain't No Sunshine"	Rockmelons featuring Deni Hines	5	6 January	9	
