= List of top 10 singles for 1996 in Australia =

This is a list of singles that charted in the top ten of the ARIA Charts in 1996.

== Top-ten singles ==
Key

Symbol	Meaning
◁	Indicates single's top 10 entry was also its ARIA top 50 debut
(#)	1996 Year-end top 10 single position and rank

List of ARIA top ten singles that peaked in 1996
Top ten entry date	Single	Artist(s)	Peak	Peak date	Weeks in top ten	References
Singles from 1995
6 November	"Boom Boom Boom"	The Outhere Brothers	2	8 January	14	
27 November	"One Sweet Day"	Mariah Carey and Boyz II Men	2	15 January	12	
Singles from 1996
8 January	"Be My Lover"	La Bouche	2	29 January	9	
8 January	"Wonderwall"	Oasis	1	5 February	11	
15 January	"Jesus to a Child" ◁	George Michael	1	15 January	4	
15 January	"Give Me One Reason"	Tracy Chapman	3	5 February	7	
15 January	"Apple Eyes"	Swoop	9	15 January	3	
22 January	"Tell Me"	Groove Theory	6	5 February	5	
29 January	"Boombastic"	Shaggy	1	29 January	9	
29 January	"Breakfast at Tiffany's"	Deep Blue Something	3	19 February	8	
12 February	"Don't Take It Personal (Just One of Dem Days)"	Monica	7	12 February	2	
12 February	"It's Oh So Quiet"	Björk	6	26 February	4	
12 February	"Diggin' on You"	TLC	6	4 March	6	
19 February	"One of Us" (#6)	Joan Osborne	1	4 March	10	
26 February	"Missing" (#7)	Everything but the Girl	2	11 March	13	
26 February	"Get Down on It"	Peter Andre featuring Past to Present	5	18 March	7	
4 March	"Spaceman"	Babylon Zoo	3	25 March	11	
11 March	"Real Love" ◁	The Beatles	6	11 March	1	
18 March	"Have a Little Faith" ◁	John Farnham	3	18 March	3	
18 March	"How Bizarre" (#4)	OMC	1	8 April	12	
25 March	"Father and Son"	Boyzone	2	22 April	8	
25 March	"Power of a Woman"	Eternal	8	8 April	6	
25 March	"Anything"	3T	5	22 April	8	
1 April	"California Love" ◁	2Pac featuring Dr. Dre	4	22 April	8	
8 April	"Ironic"	Alanis Morissette	3	6 May	9	
15 April	"Salvation" ◁	The Cranberries	8	6 May	4	
29 April	"Fastlove" ◁	George Michael	1	13 May	11	
6 May	"Sexual Healing"	Max-A-Million	5	20 May	9	
13 May	"X-Files' Theme (Version Dance)"	Triple X	2	3 June	12	
20 May	"Nobody Knows"	The Tony Rich Project	2	10 June	9	
20 May	"Sweet Dreams (Ola Ola E)"	La Bouche	8	20 May	2	
20 May	"Children"	Robert Miles	5	3 June	10	
27 May	"Until It Sleeps" ◁	Metallica	1	27 May	4	
27 May	"Runaway"	The Corrs	10	27 May	2	
3 June	"Ooh Aah... Just a Little Bit"	Gina G	5	10 June	9	
3 June	"Because You Loved Me" (#3)	Celine Dion	1	5 August	17	
10 June	"Theme from Mission: Impossible" ◁	Adam Clayton and Larry Mullen	2	8 July	9	
17 June	"Killing Me Softly" (#2) ◁	Fugees	1	17 June	13	
24 June	"Everything Is Good for You" ◁	Crowded House	10	24 June	1	
1 July	"Glycerine"	Bush	5	1 July	5	
8 July	"Just a Girl"	No Doubt	3	29 July	11	
15 July	"Blue"	LeAnn Rimes	10	15 July	1	
22 July	"Return of the Mack" (#8)	Mark Morrison	2	19 August	12	
22 July	"I Love to Love"	La Bouche	6	29 July	5	
29 July	"Mother Mother"	Tracy Bonham	5	12 August	10	
5 August	"Who You Are" ◁	Pearl Jam	5	5 August	2	
5 August	"Freedom" ◁	Robbie Williams	6	5 August	1	
5 August	"Forever Love" ◁	Gary Barlow	7	5 August	3	
12 August	"I Want You"	Savage Garden	4	2 September	11	
12 August	"That Girl"	Maxi Priest featuring Shaggy	7	19 August	6	
19 August	"Macarena" (#1)	Los del Río	1	26 August	15	
26 August	"Macarena"	Los del Mar featuring Pedro Castaño	2	2 September	8	
26 August	"You're Makin' Me High" (#10)	Toni Braxton	2	30 September	12	
16 September	"I'll Be There for You"	The Rembrandts	3	7 October	8	
23 September	"Hero of the Day" ◁	Metallica	2	23 September	3	
23 September	"Change the World"	Eric Clapton	8	14 October	2	
30 September	"I Love You Always Forever"	Donna Lewis	2	14 October	10	
30 September	"Lover Lover" ◁	Jimmy Barnes	6	14 October	5	
7 October	"Wannabe" (#5)	Spice Girls	1	28 October	16	
14 October	"Let's Make a Night to Remember"	Bryan Adams	7	4 November	7	
21 October	"Sometimes When We Touch"	Newton	5	25 November	8	
21 October	"It's All Coming Back to Me Now"	Celine Dion	8	4 November	7	
28 October	"What's Love Got to Do with It" (#9)	Warren G featuring Adina Howard	2	4 November	12	
4 November	"Where Do You Go"	No Mercy	2	2 December	12	
11 November	"Don't Stop Movin'"	Livin' Joy	6	9 December	8	
18 November	"I Live for You"	Chynna Phillips	9	25 November	2	
16 December	"Macarena Christmas"	Los Del Río	5	16 December	4	

=== 1995 peaks ===
List of ARIA top ten singles in 1996 that peaked in 1995
Top ten entry date	Single	Artist(s)	Peak	Peak date	Weeks in top ten	References
18 September	"Stayin' Alive" ◁	N-Trance featuring Ricardo da Force	1	9 October	17	
2 October	"Gangsta's Paradise" ◁	Coolio featuring L.V.	1	16 October	17	
23 October	"Let's Groove" ◁	CDB	2	20 November	15	
13 November	"It's Alright"	Deni Hines	4	4 December	10	
4 December	"Miss Sarajevo" ◁	Passengers	7	4 December	6	
11 December	"I Got Id" ◁	Pearl Jam	2	11 December	5	

=== 1997 peaks ===
List of ARIA top ten singles in 1996 that peaked in 1997
Top ten entry date	Single	Artist(s)	Peak	Peak date	Weeks in top ten	References
2 December	"Breathe" ◁	The Prodigy	2	10 March	24	
2 December	"To the Moon and Back"	Savage Garden	1	13 January	14	
2 December	"Wishes"	Human Nature	6	6 January	7	
9 December	"(If You're Not in It for Love) I'm Outta Here!"	Shania Twain	5	20 January	13	
9 December	"Un-Break My Heart"	Toni Braxton	6	13 January	12	
