= List of top 10 singles for 1997 in Australia =

This is a list of singles that charted in the top ten of the ARIA Charts in 1997.

== Top-ten singles ==
Key

Symbol	Meaning
◁	Indicates single's top 10 entry was also its ARIA top 50 debut
(#)	1997 Year-end top 10 single position and rank

List of ARIA top ten singles that peaked in 1997
Top ten entry date	Single	Artist(s)	Peak	Peak date	Weeks in top ten	References
Singles from 1996
2 December	"Breathe" (#9) ◁	The Prodigy	2	10 March	24	
2 December	"To the Moon and Back"	Savage Garden	1	13 January	14	
2 December	"Wishes"	Human Nature	6	6 January	7	
9 December	"(If You're Not in It for Love) I'm Outta Here!"	Shania Twain	5	20 January	13	
9 December	"Un-Break My Heart"	Toni Braxton	6	13 January	12	
Singles from 1997
6 January	"Break My Stride" (#10)	Unique II	2	13 January	12	
13 January	"Don't Speak" (#8)	No Doubt	1	3 February	13	
20 January	"Freak" ◁	Silverchair	1	20 January	12	
20 January	"I Finally Found Someone"	Barbra Streisand and Bryan Adams	2	3 February	11	
27 January	"Twisted"	Keith Sweat	9	27 January	2	
27 January	"Sexy Eyes"	Whigfield	6	24 February	12	
10 February	"Discothèque" ◁	U2	3	10 February	2	
17 February	"Don't Cry for Me Argentina"	Madonna	9	3 March	3	
10 March	"Pony"	Ginuwine	3	17 March	10	
10 March	"Last Night"	Az Yet	2	17 March	13	
10 March	"Don't Let Go (Love)"	En Vogue	3	24 March	15	
10 March	"Don't Say Goodbye" ◁	Human Nature	8	14 April	6	
17 March	"Truly Madly Deeply" (#7)	Savage Garden	1	31 March	17	
31 March	"Abuse Me" ◁	Silverchair	9	31 March	4	
7 April	"I Shot the Sheriff"	Warren G	8	7 April	3	
14 April	"2 Become 1" ◁	Spice Girls	2	28 April	12	
21 April	"Your Woman"	White Town	2	12 May	11	
28 April	"Blood on the Dance Floor" ◁	Michael Jackson	5	12 May	6	
5 May	"Secret Garden"	Bruce Springsteen	9	5 May	3	
12 May	"One More Time"	Real McCoy	3	19 May	9	
19 May	"When I Die"	No Mercy	2	9 June	9	
19 May	"You Were Meant for Me"	Jewel	3	23 June	12	
26 May	"MMMBop" (#5) ◁	Hanson	1	26 May	13	
9 June	"Ashes to Ashes" ◁	Faith No More	8	9 June	4	
9 June	"Song 2"	Blur	4	30 June	7	
23 June	"Break Me Shake Me" ◁	Savage Garden	7	23 June	1	
30 June	"The End Is the Beginning Is the End"	The Smashing Pumpkins	10	30 June	1	
7 July	"Cemetery" ◁	Silverchair	5	7 July	2	
7 July	"When Doves Cry" ◁	Quindon Tarver	3	14 July	10	
7 July	"Even When I'm Sleeping"	Leonardo's Bride	4	21 July	6	
7 July	"Hard to Say I'm Sorry"	Az Yet featuring Peter Cetera	5	14 July	11	
14 July	"Burn" ◁	Tina Arena	2	14 July	4	
14 July	"B*tch"	Meredith Brooks	2	21 July	14	
21 July	"I'll Be Missing You" (#4)	Puff Daddy and Faith Evans featuring 112	1	28 July	13	
21 July	"Alone"	Bee Gees	7	1 September	9	
28 July	"How Come, How Long"	Babyface featuring Stevie Wonder	5	18 August	10	
4 August	"Men in Black" (#6) ◁	Will Smith	1	1 September	13	
11 August	"Where's the Love" ◁	Hanson	2	11 August	12	
25 August	"Honey" ◁	Mariah Carey	8	25 August	4	
25 August	"How Do I Live"	Trisha Yearwood	3	22 September	14	
1 September	"Semi-Charmed Life"	Third Eye Blind	8	15 September	4	
15 September	"C U When U Get There"	Coolio featuring 40 Thevz	7	15 September	7	
29 September	"Something About the Way You Look Tonight"/"Candle in the Wind 1997" (#1) ◁	Elton John	1	29 September	14	
29 September	"I Say a Little Prayer"	Diana King	6	13 October	6	
29 September	"Barbie Girl" (#2)	Aqua	1	10 November	11	
6 October	"Everytime You Cry" ◁	John Farnham and Human Nature	3	20 October	10	
20 October	"Everybody (Backstreet's Back)"	Backstreet Boys	3	8 December	9	
20 October	"Got 'til It's Gone"	Janet featuring Q-Tip and Joni Mitchell	10	20 October	2	
3 November	"Tubthumping" (#3) ◁	Chumbawamba	1	1 December	16	
3 November	"Spice Up Your Life"	Spice Girls	8	3 November	5	
3 November	"Mo Money Mo Problems"	The Notorious B.I.G. featuring Puff Daddy and Mase	10	3 November	1	
10 November	"I Will Come to You" ◁	Hanson	2	8 December	11	
10 November	"Tell Him" ◁	Barbra Streisand and Celine Dion	9	10 November	1	
10 November	"Da Ya Think I'm Sexy?"	N-Trance featuring Rod Stewart	3	1 December	15	
17 November	"The Memory Remains" ◁	Metallica	6	17 November	1	
17 November	"Coco Jamboo"	Mr. President	7	1 December	10	
1 December	"Push"	Matchbox 20	8	1 December	6	
8 December	"Doctor Jones" ◁	Aqua	1	22 December	13	

=== 1996 peaks ===
List of ARIA top ten singles in 1997 that peaked in 1996
Top ten entry date	Single	Artist(s)	Peak	Peak date	Weeks in top ten	References
7 October	"Wannabe"	Spice Girls	1	28 October	16	
28 October	"What's Love Got to Do with It"	Warren G featuring Adina Howard	2	4 November	12	
4 November	"Where Do You Go"	No Mercy	2	2 December	12	
16 December	"Macarena Christmas"	Los del Río	5	16 December	4	

=== 1998 peaks ===
List of ARIA top ten singles in 1997 that peaked in 1998
Top ten entry date	Single	Artist(s)	Peak	Peak date	Weeks in top ten	References
15 December	"As Long as You Love Me"	Backstreet Boys	2	12 January	12	
15 December	"You Sexy Thing"	T-Shirt	6	5 January	14	
29 December	"Together Again"	Janet Jackson	4	12 January	12	
