= List of top 10 singles for 1994 in Australia =

This is a list of singles that charted in the top ten of the ARIA Charts in 1994.

== Top-ten singles ==
Key

Symbol	Meaning
◁	Indicates single's top 10 entry was also its ARIA top 50 debut
(#)	1994 Year-end top 10 single position and rank

List of ARIA top ten singles that peaked in 1994
Top ten entry date	Single	Artist(s)	Peak	Peak date	Weeks in top ten	References
Singles from 1993
1 November	"Boom! Shake the Room"	DJ Jazzy Jeff & the Fresh Prince	1	10 January	15	
6 December	"Shoop"	Salt-N-Pepa	2	24 January	10	
13 December	"Hero"	Mariah Carey	7	10 January	11	
Singles from 1994
3 January	"All for Love" (#10) ◁	Bryan Adams, Rod Stewart and Sting	1	17 January	10	
3 January	"Moving on Up"	M People	4	31 January	9	
10 January	"Give It Up"	Cut 'N' Move	1	31 January	11	
17 January	"Slave to the Music"	Twenty 4 Seven featuring Stay-C and Nance	2	14 February	10	
24 January	"A**hole"	Denis Leary	2	7 February	8	
31 January	"Feels Like Heaven"	Urban Cookie Collective	10	31 January	1	
7 February	"Stay (Faraway, So Close!)" ◁	U2	5	7 February	4	
14 February	"Hey Mr. D.J."	Zhané	9	14 February	1	
14 February	"Said I Loved You... But I Lied"	Michael Bolton	2	7 March	7	
21 February	"It's Alright" (#4)	East 17	1	28 February	11	
21 February	"Feelin' Alright"	EYC	7	28 February	5	
28 February	"Whatta Man" ◁	Salt-N-Pepa featuring En Vogue	2	14 March	9	
7 March	"The Power of Love" (#6)	Celine Dion	1	18 April	12	
7 March	"Sing Hallelujah!"	Dr. Alban	5	28 March	8	
14 March	"Without You"	Mariah Carey	3	28 March	12	
21 March	"Dum Da Dum"	Melodie MC	5	4 April	7	
28 March	"Streets of Philadelphia"	Bruce Springsteen	4	11 April	7	
28 March	"Things Can Only Get Better"	D:Ream	9	28 March	5	
28 March	"Loser"	Beck	8	4 April	2	
4 April	"The Sign" (#5)	Ace of Base	1	25 April	12	
11 April	"Breathe Again"	Toni Braxton	2	25 April	9	
2 May	"Right in the Night (Fall in Love with Music)"	Jam & Spoon featuring Plavka	2	30 May	11	
2 May	"The Most Beautiful Girl in the World"	Prince	1	23 May	10	
2 May	"I'll Remember"	Madonna	7	9 May	6	
9 May	"Doop"	Doop	5	30 May	6	
16 May	"One (Live)" ◁	Metallica	5	16 May	4	
16 May	"Mmm Mmm Mmm Mmm"	Crash Test Dummies	1	6 June	12	
30 May	"Stay"	Eternal	3	27 June	8	
6 June	"Around the World" ◁	East 17	4	4 July	6	
13 June	"Love Is All Around" (#1)	Wet Wet Wet	1	27 June	18	
13 June	"I'll Stand by You"	The Pretenders	8	20 June	3	
13 June	"Bizarre Love Triangle"	Frente!	7	27 June	4	
20 June	"More Wine Waiter Please"	The Poor	10	20 June	1	
27 June	"U R the Best Thing"	D:Ream	9	27 June	1	
27 June	"I Believe"	Marcella Detroit	10	27 June	1	
4 July	"I Like to Move It"	Reel 2 Real featuring The Mad Stuntman	6	4 July	8	
4 July	"Shaka Jam"	Kulcha	7	11 July	3	
4 July	"Pray"	Take That	10	4 July	1	
11 July	"100% Pure Love"	Crystal Waters	2	25 July	11	
11 July	"Baby, I Love Your Way"	Big Mountain	4	18 July	9	
11 July	"The Winner Is..."	Southend with Nik Fish	9	11 July	1	
18 July	"Absolutely Fabulous" ◁	Absolutely Fabulous	2	18 July	5	
18 July	"I Swear" (#2)	All-4-One	1	8 August	14	
18 July	"Black Hole Sun"	Soundgarden	6	15 August	7	
25 July	"You Gotta Be"	Des'ree	9	25 July	2	
25 July	"Shine"	Collective Soul	8	8 August	4	
1 August	"Son of a Gun"	JX	6	22 August	6	
15 August	"Swamp Thing"	The Grid	3	5 September	11	
22 August	"Stay (I Missed You)"	Lisa Loeb & Nine Stories	6	29 August	6	
22 August	"7 Seconds"	Youssou N'Dour and Neneh Cherry	3	26 September	10	
29 August	"Can You Feel the Love Tonight"	Elton John	9	5 September	3	
5 September	"The Rhythm of the Night"	Corona	8	12 September	2	
12 September	"Confide in Me"	Kylie Minogue	1	12 September	9	
12 September	"Hands Out of My Pocket" ◁	Cold Chisel	9	12 September	1	
12 September	"Endless Love" ◁	Luther Vandross and Mariah Carey	2	26 September	10	
19 September	"I'll Make Love to You" (#7) ◁	Boyz II Men	1	10 October	12	
19 September	"Rockin' for Myself"	Motiv 8 featuring Angie Brown	9	19 September	2	
3 October	"Always" (#3)	Bon Jovi	2	17 October	16	
3 October	"Tomorrow" (#9)	Silverchair	1	24 October	20	
3 October	"Chains"	Tina Arena	4	21 November	13	
17 October	"Secret" ◁	Madonna	5	17 October	7	
24 October	"Closer"	Nine Inch Nails	3	7 November	6	
31 October	"About a Girl (MTV Unplugged version)" ◁	Nirvana	4	31 October	1	
31 October	"Come Out and Play"	The Offspring	8	28 November	13	
7 November	"All I Wanna Do"	Sheryl Crow	1	5 December	12	
14 November	"Spin the Black Circle" ◁	Pearl Jam	3	14 November	3	
21 November	"Zombie"	The Cranberries	1	12 December	16	
5 December	"If I Only Knew" ◁	Tom Jones	5	5 December	6	
5 December	"Turn the Beat Around"	Gloria Estefan	8	19 December	6	
12 December	"All I Want for Christmas Is You"	Mariah Carey	2	19 December	3	

=== 1993 peaks ===
List of ARIA top ten singles in 1994 that peaked in 1993
Top ten entry date	Single	Artist(s)	Peak	Peak date	Weeks in top ten	References
18 October	"All That She Wants"	Ace of Base	1	1 November	14	
8 November	"Please Forgive Me" (#8) ◁	Bryan Adams	1	22 November	14	
22 November	"Creep"	Radiohead	6	6 December	8	
6 December	"The Weight"	Jimmy Barnes with The Badloves	6	13 December	5	
13 December	"Got to Get It"	Culture Beat	7	13 December	7	

=== 1995 peaks ===
List of ARIA top ten singles in 1994 that peaked in 1995
Top ten entry date	Single	Artist(s)	Peak	Peak date	Weeks in top ten	References
5 December	"Short Dick Man" ◁	20 Fingers featuring Gillette	4	9 January	9	
19 December	"On Bended Knee"	Boyz II Men	7	2 January	6	
