= List of top 10 singles for 2000 in Australia =

This is a list of singles that charted in the top ten of the ARIA Charts in 2000.

== Top-ten singles ==
Key

Symbol	Meaning
◁	Indicates single's top 10 entry was also its ARIA top 50 debut
(#)	2000 Year-end top 10 single position and rank

List of ARIA top ten singles that peaked in 2000
Top ten entry date	Single	Artist(s)	Peak	Peak date	Weeks in top ten	References
Singles from 1999
22 November	"Waiting for Tonight"	Jennifer Lopez	4	3 January	6	
13 December	"The Bad Touch"	Bloodhound Gang	5	7 February	7	
13 December	"Keep on Movin'"	Five	6	3 January	2	
13 December	"I Try"	Macy Gray	1	10 January	13	
20 December	"Don't Say You Love Me"	M2M	4	10 January	6	
Singles from 2000
3 January	"Will 2K"	Will Smith	3	3 January	3	
3 January	"Mascara"/"Leave Me Alone"	Killing Heidi	1	24 January	12	
10 January	"Better Off Alone"	Alice Deejay	4	31 January	5	
10 January	"Steal My Sunshine"	Len	3	24 January	8	
24 January	"What a Girl Wants"	Christina Aguilera	5	31 January	5	
24 January	"S Club Party"	S Club 7	2	28 February	10	
7 February	"Move Your Body" ◁	Eiffel 65	4	6 March	9	
14 February	"Bloke"	Chris Franklin	1	21 February	9	
14 February	"Pray"	Tina Cousins	8	14 February	1	
14 February	"I Wanna Love You Forever" ◁	Jessica Simpson	9	28 February	5	
21 February	"Pure Shores" ◁	All Saints	4	27 March	9	
28 February	"Candy"	Mandy Moore	2	27 March	10	
6 March	"American Pie" ◁	Madonna	1	6 March	5	
6 March	"What's a Girl to Do?" ◁	Sister2Sister	5	27 March	7	
13 March	"Bye Bye Bye" (#7) ◁	NSYNC	1	13 March	11	
27 March	"If Only"	Hanson	9	27 March	1	
27 March	"All the Small Things"	Blink-182	8	10 April	5	
3 April	"Adelante" ◁	Sash!	4	17 April	9	
10 April	"Live Without It" ◁	Killing Heidi	5	17 April	2	
17 April	"Poison" (#6) ◁	Bardot	1	17 April	6	
17 April	"Say My Name" (#5)	Destiny's Child	1	1 May	9	
17 April	"Never Be the Same Again"	Melanie C featuring Lisa "Left Eye" Lopes	2	8 May	11	
24 April	"We Think It's Love"	Leah Haywood	7	24 April	2	
24 April	"Don't Give Up"	Chicane featuring Bryan Adams	6	8 May	4	
24 April	"Ex-Girlfriend"	No Doubt	9	24 April	1	
1 May	"He Wasn't Man Enough" ◁	Toni Braxton	5	5 June	10	
1 May	"Holiday"	Naughty by Nature	8	1 May	6	
8 May	"Nothing as It Seems" ◁	Pearl Jam	7	8 May	1	
15 May	"Oops!... I Did It Again" ◁	Britney Spears	1	29 May	6	
15 May	"There You Go"	Pink	2	12 June	8	
22 May	"Shine" ◁	Vanessa Amorosi	4	22 May	7	
29 May	"It's My Life"	Bon Jovi	5	19 June	12	
29 May	"Thong Song"	Sisqó	2	19 June	12	
5 June	"Freestyler" (#3)	Bomfunk MC's	1	3 July	12	
12 June	"Who the Hell Are You" (#8) ◁	Madison Avenue	1	12 June	10	
19 June	"I'm Outta Love" (#1) ◁	Anastacia	1	24 July	15	
26 June	"Spinning Around" ◁	Kylie Minogue	1	26 June	4	
3 July	"Toca's Miracle"	Fragma	8	3 July	5	
3 July	"Day & Night"	Billie Piper	8	17 July	6	
10 July	"Shalala La"	Vengaboys	4	24 July	7	
17 July	"I Think I'm in Love with You"	Jessica Simpson	10	17 July	1	
24 July	"We Will Rock You" ◁	Five and Queen	3	21 August	8	
24 July	"Jumpin', Jumpin'"	Destiny's Child	2	7 August	9	
7 August	"Try Again"	Aaliyah	8	7 August	4	
14 August	"Breathless"	The Corrs	7	14 August	4	
21 August	"My Happiness" ◁	Powderfinger	4	21 August	1	
21 August	"Lucky"	Britney Spears	3	4 September	6	
21 August	"Life Is a Rollercoaster"	Ronan Keating	6	28 August	5	
28 August	"Music" (#4) ◁	Madonna	1	28 August	8	
28 August	"Shackles (Praise You)" (#10)	Mary Mary	2	11 September	9	
28 August	"Say It Isn't So" ◁	Bon Jovi	9	28 August	2	
28 August	"Rock DJ"	Robbie Williams	4	11 September	8	
11 September	"Most Girls"	Pink	1	2 October	10	
18 September	"On a Night Like This" ◁	Kylie Minogue	1	18 September	7	
18 September	"Fill Me In"	Craig David	6	2 October	7	
25 September	"Everything You Need" ◁	Madison Avenue	6	25 September	3	
25 September	"B-Boys & Flygirls"	Bomfunk MC's	7	2 October	6	
2 October	"Groovejet (If This Ain't Love)" (#9)	Spiller	1	23 October	12	
2 October	"Come on Over Baby (All I Want Is You)"	Christina Aguilera	9	9 October	3	
16 October	"Beautiful Day" ◁	U2	1	16 October	3	
16 October	"Teenage Dirtbag" (#2)	Wheatus	1	13 November	18	
23 October	"She Bangs" ◁	Ricky Martin	3	23 October	6	
30 October	"Holler" ◁	Spice Girls	2	30 October	6	
30 October	"Gotta Tell You"	Samantha Mumba	3	6 November	4	
6 November	"Shape of My Heart" ◁	Backstreet Boys	5	6 November	1	
6 November	"Don't You Worry"	Madasun	6	20 November	6	
6 November	"Let's Get Loud"	Jennifer Lopez	9	6 November	5	
6 November	"Graduation (Friends Forever)"	Vitamin C	2	27 November	9	
13 November	"Who Let the Dogs Out" ◁	Baha Men	1	20 November	6	
20 November	"He Don't Love You"	Human Nature	4	27 November	8	
27 November	"Don't Tell Me" ◁	Madonna	7	18 December	6	
4 December	"Independent Women Part I"	Destiny's Child	3	25 December	9	
11 December	"Lady (Hear Me Tonight)"	Modjo	10	11 December	1	
25 December	"Bruce 2000"	The Twelfth Man	5	25 December	1	

=== 1999 peaks ===
List of ARIA top ten singles in 2000 that peaked in 1999
Top ten entry date	Single	Artist(s)	Peak	Peak date	Weeks in top ten	References
18 October	"Blue (Da Ba Dee)"	Eiffel 65	1	8 November	16	
25 October	"Don't Call Me Baby" ◁	Madison Avenue	2	15 November	15	
15 November	"Bring It All Back"	S Club 7	3	29 November	8	
29 November	"Absolutely Everybody"	Vanessa Amorosi	6	6 December	14	
20 December	"The Millennium Prayer" ◁	Cliff Richard	2	20 December	3	

=== 2001 peaks ===
List of ARIA top ten singles in 2000 that peaked in 2001
Top ten entry date	Single	Artist(s)	Peak	Peak date	Weeks in top ten	References
4 December	"7 Days"	Craig David	4	1 January	10	
11 December	"Cruisin'"	Gwyneth Paltrow and Huey Lewis	1	8 January	11	
18 December	"The Itch"	Vitamin C	6	8 January	8	
18 December	"Original Prankster"	The Offspring	5	1 January	7	
