= List of top 10 singles for 1993 in Australia =

This is a list of singles that charted in the top ten of the ARIA Charts in 1993.

== Top-ten singles ==
Key

Symbol	Meaning
◁	Indicates single's top 10 entry was also its ARIA top 50 debut
(#)	1993 Year-end top 10 single position and rank

List of ARIA top ten singles that peaked in 1993
Top ten entry date	Single	Artist(s)	Peak	Peak date	Weeks in top ten	References
Singles from 1992
14 December	"Tequila"	A.L.T. & the Lost Civilization	8	11 January	10	
Singles from 1993
4 January	"You Don't Treat Me No Good" (#3)	Sonia Dada	1	22 February	16	
4 January	"December, 1963 (Oh, What a Night)"	The Four Seasons	3	22 February	11	
11 January	"In Your Room"	Toni Pearen	10	11 January	1	
18 January	"Jump!"	The Movement	7	8 February	6	
25 January	"How Do You Talk to an Angel" ◁	The Heights	3	25 January	6	
1 February	"People Everyday"	Arrested Development	6	8 February	6	
15 February	"You Ain't Thinking (About Me)"	Sonia Dada	3	8 March	8	
15 February	"Happy Birthday Helen"	Things of Stone and Wood	9	15 February	3	
22 February	"Sweet Lullaby"	Deep Forest	7	1 March	2	
1 March	"Gimme Little Sign"	Peter Andre	3	22 March	13	
1 March	"Cats in the Cradle" (#8) ◁	Ugly Kid Joe	1	22 March	14	
8 March	"Are You Gonna Go My Way" ◁	Lenny Kravitz	1	29 March	13	
8 March	"Layla (Acoustic)"	Eric Clapton	7	12 April	9	
8 March	"If I Ever Fall in Love"	Shai	4	29 March	8	
15 March	"Bed of Roses"	Bon Jovi	10	15 March	3	
22 March	"House of Love"	East 17	5	12 April	8	
22 March	"Truganini"	Midnight Oil	10	22 March	1	
29 March	"Give In to Me"	Michael Jackson	4	5 April	9	
12 April	"Mr. Wendal"/"Revolution"	Arrested Development	7	3 May	5	
12 April	"I'm Easy"	Faith No More	1	10 May	10	
3 May	"No Limit"	2 Unlimited	7	10 May	5	
3 May	"Rump Shaker"	Wreckx-n-Effect	10	3 May	1	
10 May	"That's the Way Love Goes" ◁	Janet Jackson	1	24 May	14	
10 May	"You Were There"	Southern Sons	6	31 May	5	
17 May	"Two Princes"	Spin Doctors	3	31 May	9	
17 May	"I Want You"	Toni Pearen	10	17 May	1	
24 May	"Informer" (#6)	Snow	1	31 May	13	
31 May	"Stone Cold"	Jimmy Barnes	4	7 June	8	
31 May	"The Right Kind of Love"	Jeremy Jordan	5	14 June	9	
7 June	"Tribal Dance"	2 Unlimited	5	21 June	5	
7 June	"She Kissed Me"	Terence Trent D'Arby	9	7 June	2	
7 June	"Deep"	East 17	7	14 June	4	
14 June	"The Hitman"	AB Logic	6	12 July	8	
21 June	"Can't Get Enough of Your Love" (#5)	Taylor Dayne	2	26 July	11	
21 June	"A Whole New World"	Peabo Bryson and Regina Belle	10	21 June	1	
28 June	"(I Can't Help) Falling in Love with You"	UB40	1	5 July	12	
5 July	"Oh Carolina"	Shaggy	5	5 July	6	
12 July	"Freak Me"	Silk	3	2 August	9	
19 July	"Believe"	Lenny Kravitz	8	19 July	3	
26 July	"Killing in the Name"	Rage Against the Machine	7	9 August	6	
2 August	"West End Girls"	East 17	4	9 August	5	
9 August	"Sweat (A La La La La Long)" (#4)	Inner Circle	2	23 August	14	
9 August	"The River of Dreams"	Billy Joel	1	23 August	9	
16 August	"What's Up?" (#7)	4 Non Blondes	2	6 September	11	
16 August	"In These Arms"	Bon Jovi	10	16 August	1	
23 August	"Rain"	Madonna	5	13 September	5	
23 August	"Three Little Pigs"	Green Jellÿ	6	6 September	6	
30 August	"I'd Do Anything for Love (But I Won't Do That)" (#1) ◁	Meat Loaf	1	30 August	12	
30 August	"Numb" ◁	U2	7	30 August	1	
13 September	"Everybody Hurts"	R.E.M.	6	20 September	4	
13 September	"Mr. Vain"	Culture Beat	1	25 October	11	
13 September	"The Floor"	Johnny Gill	6	4 October	7	
20 September	"Dreamlover"	Mariah Carey	7	27 September	4	
27 September	"If I Can't Have You"	Kim Wilde	3	18 October	10	
4 October	"Tease Me"	Chaka Demus & Pliers	5	4 October	6	
11 October	"Dreams"	Gabrielle	2	8 November	12	
11 October	"Soul to Squeeze"	Red Hot Chili Peppers	9	11 October	4	
18 October	"All That She Wants" (#9)	Ace of Base	1	1 November	14	
1 November	"The Key the Secret"	Urban Cookie Collective	4	29 November	9	
8 November	"Please Forgive Me" (#10) ◁	Bryan Adams	1	22 November	14	
15 November	"Lemon" ◁	U2	6	29 November	4	
15 November	"Go West"	Pet Shop Boys	10	15 November	3	
22 November	"Creep"	Radiohead	6	6 December	8	
29 November	"No Rain"	Blind Melon	8	6 December	2	
6 December	"The Weight"	Jimmy Barnes with The Badloves	6	13 December	5	
13 December	"Got to Get It"	Culture Beat	7	13 December	7	

=== 1992 peaks ===
List of ARIA top ten singles in 1993 that peaked in 1992
Top ten entry date	Single	Artist(s)	Peak	Peak date	Weeks in top ten	References
14 September	"November Rain"	Guns N' Roses	5	28 September	24	
14 September	"Achy Breaky Heart"	Billy Ray Cyrus	1	28 September	17	
12 October	"The Day You Went Away"	Wendy Matthews	2	30 November	15	
26 October	"End of the Road"	Boyz II Men	1	16 November	16	
16 November	"Accidently Kelly Street"	Frente!	4	7 December	11	
23 November	"Would I Lie to You?"	Charles & Eddie	3	7 December	12	
7 December	"I Will Always Love You" (#2)	Whitney Houston	1	14 December	18	

=== 1994 peaks ===
List of ARIA top ten singles in 1993 that peaked in 1994
Top ten entry date	Single	Artist(s)	Peak	Peak date	Weeks in top ten	References
1 November	"Boom! Shake the Room"	DJ Jazzy Jeff & the Fresh Prince	1	10 January	15	
6 December	"Shoop"	Salt-N-Pepa	2	24 January	10	
13 December	"Hero"	Mariah Carey	7	10 January	11	
