= List of top 10 singles for 1999 in Australia =

This is a list of singles that charted in the top ten of the ARIA Charts in 1999.

== Top-ten singles ==
Key

Symbol	Meaning
◁	Indicates single's top 10 entry was also its ARIA top 50 debut
(#)	1999 Year-end top 10 single position and rank

List of ARIA top ten singles that peaked in 1999
Top ten entry date	Single	Artist(s)	Peak	Peak date	Weeks in top ten	References
Singles from 1998
7 December	"Believe" (#6)	Cher	1	18 January	13	
14 December	"Goodbye" ◁	Spice Girls	3	11 January	9	
28 December	"When You're Gone"	Bryan Adams featuring Melanie C	4	18 January	8	
28 December	"Jackie"	B.Z. featuring Joanne	3	25 January	11	
Singles from 1999
4 January	"No Matter What"	Boyzone	5	1 February	16	
11 January	"Got the Feelin'"	Five	6	1 February	5	
11 January	"A Little Bit"	Pandora	10	11 January	2	
25 January	"Lullaby" ◁	Shawn Mullins	5	22 February	9	
1 February	"...Baby One More Time" (#2)	Britney Spears	1	22 February	17	
8 February	"How Do I Deal"	Jennifer Love Hewitt	8	8 February	3	
15 February	"That Don't Impress Me Much" (#8) ◁	Shania Twain	2	1 March	13	
15 February	"Can't Take My Eyes Off of You"/"Doo Wop (That Thing)"	Lauryn Hill	8	8 March	5	
22 February	"Anthem for the Year 2000" ◁	Silverchair	3	22 February	10	
1 March	"The Animal Song" ◁	Savage Garden	3	1 March	14	
1 March	"This Kiss"	Faith Hill	4	8 March	8	
8 March	"Touch It"	Monifah	5	8 March	11	
22 March	"Have You Ever?"	Brandy	8	22 March	1	
22 March	"Why Don't You Get a Job?" (#9) ◁	The Offspring	2	19 April	11	
29 March	"We Like to Party!"	Vengaboys	2	3 May	13	
29 March	"Changes"	2Pac	7	5 April	2	
29 March	"Heartbeat"/"Tragedy"	Steps	10	29 March	1	
12 April	"No Scrubs"	TLC	1	26 April	13	
19 April	"Until the Time Is Through"	Five	8	3 May	3	
26 April	"Fly Away"	Lenny Kravitz	8	26 April	2	
3 May	"Honey to the Bee"	Billie	6	7 June	6	
10 May	"I Want It That Way" ◁	Backstreet Boys	2	31 May	10	
17 May	"Look at Me" ◁	Geri Halliwell	3	17 May	7	
17 May	"Thank ABBA for the Music"	Steps, Tina Cousins, Cleopatra, B*Witched and Billie	9	31 May	4	
24 May	"Livin' la Vida Loca"	Ricky Martin	4	7 June	7	
31 May	"Kiss Me"	Sixpence None the Richer	1	14 June	12	
7 June	"9 PM (Till I Come)"	ATB	10	7 June	3	
14 June	"Sometimes" ◁	Britney Spears	2	19 July	12	
14 June	"Man! I Feel Like a Woman!" ◁	Shania Twain	4	21 June	9	
14 June	"Beautiful Stranger" ◁	Madonna	5	21 June	8	
28 June	"Last Kiss" (#4) ◁	Pearl Jam	1	26 July	17	
28 June	"If You Had My Love"	Jennifer Lopez	1	5 July	10	
28 June	"Say It Once"	Ultra	4	5 July	7	
12 July	"Don't Cry" ◁	Human Nature	5	12 July	1	
19 July	"Get Set"	Taxiride	8	19 July	2	
19 July	"Boom, Boom, Boom, Boom!!"	Vengaboys	2	16 August	11	
19 July	"Westside"	TQ	10	19 July	1	
26 July	"When You Say Nothing at All"	Ronan Keating	3	30 August	11	
2 August	"Sweet Like Chocolate"	Shanks & Bigfoot	6	23 August	7	
9 August	"If Ya Gettin' Down" ◁	Five	2	23 August	12	
16 August	"Silence"	Delerium featuring Sarah McLachlan	6	30 August	3	
16 August	"All Star"	Smash Mouth	4	6 September	9	
23 August	"Wild Wild West"	Will Smith	8	13 September	4	
30 August	"Baby Did a Bad Bad Thing"	Chris Isaak	9	30 August	2	
6 September	"Genie in a Bottle" (#10) ◁	Christina Aguilera	2	27 September	12	
6 September	"Mambo No. 5 (A Little Bit Of...)" (#1) ◁	Lou Bega	1	13 September	14	
13 September	"2 Times"	Ann Lee	4	11 October	11	
20 September	"She's So High"	Tal Bachman	8	20 September	1	
27 September	"I Knew I Loved You" ◁	Savage Garden	4	18 October	8	
27 September	"Unpretty"	TLC	3	11 October	5	
4 October	"Larger Than Life" ◁	Backstreet Boys	3	4 October	7	
11 October	"Smooth"	Santana featuring Rob Thomas	4	1 November	12	
18 October	"Blue (Da Ba Dee)" (#3)	Eiffel 65	1	8 November	16	
25 October	"Don't Call Me Baby" (#7) ◁	Madison Avenue	2	15 November	15	
25 October	"Sister"	Sister2Sister	3	6 December	10	
8 November	"Heartbreaker"	Mariah Carey	10	8 November	1	
15 November	"Bring It All Back"	S Club 7	3	29 November	8	
15 November	"Burning Down the House"	Tom Jones and The Cardigans	8	22 November	5	
29 November	"Absolutely Everybody"	Vanessa Amorosi	6	6 December	14	
29 November	"Eternal Flame"	Human Nature	8	29 November	1	
6 December	"Weir"	Killing Heidi	6	13 December	3	
20 December	"The Millennium Prayer" ◁	Cliff Richard	2	20 December	3	

=== 1998 peaks ===
List of ARIA top ten singles in 1999 that peaked in 1998
Top ten entry date	Single	Artist(s)	Peak	Peak date	Weeks in top ten	References
21 September	"From This Moment On"	Shania Twain	2	2 November	18	
12 October	"Crush"	Jennifer Paige	1	23 November	15	
9 November	"Finally Found"	Honeyz	3	7 December	12	
16 November	"If You Could Read My Mind"	Stars on 54	3	23 November	8	
23 November	"Pretty Fly (For a White Guy)" (#5)	The Offspring	1	7 December	14	

=== 2000 peaks ===
List of ARIA top ten singles in 1999 that peaked in 2000
Top ten entry date	Single	Artist(s)	Peak	Peak date	Weeks in top ten	References
22 November	"Waiting for Tonight"	Jennifer Lopez	4	3 January	6	
13 December	"The Bad Touch"	Bloodhound Gang	5	7 February	7	
13 December	"Keep on Movin'"	Five	6	3 January	2	
13 December	"I Try"	Macy Gray	1	10 January	13	
20 December	"Don't Say You Love Me"	M2M	4	10 January	6	
