= Pop Singer (John Cougar Mellencamp song) =

1989 single by John Mellencamp

Single by John Cougar Mellencamp

from the album Big Daddy
- B-side: "J.M.'s Question"
- Released: April 1989
- Length: 2:45
- Label: Mercury
- Songwriter: John Mellencamp
- Producer: John Mellencamp

John Cougar Mellencamp singles chronology
"Rave On" (1988)	"Pop Singer" (1989)	"Jackie Brown" (1989)

"Pop Singer" is a song by American singer-songwriter John Mellencamp (then under the stage name John Cougar Mellencamp), released in April 1989 from Mellencamp's tenth studio album, Big Daddy (1989). Mellencamp wrote the song himself, in response to how the music industry was attempting to hide his "real" image, which included adopting one of his previous stage names, Johnny Cougar. The single was moderately successful worldwide, reaching number one in Canada and New Zealand, number eight in Australia, and number 15 on the US Billboard Hot 100.

== Background ==
In a 1987 interview with Creem, Mellencamp said, "The most crucial thing for me is that I want it to be real." Referring to his false image in his early years as a musician, Mellencamp was upset with the choices his manager made, including performing under the stage name "Johnny Cougar". Mellencamp wanted to focus solely on his music and not his image, so he began to exert more control over his musical career. As a result, he avoided common practices that musicians undertake, including meet-and-greets and radio station concerts. Many fans appreciated this change of style, particularly the devotion he had to his work.

Mellencamp wrote "Pop Singer" in the midst of a divorce with Victoria Granucci, at which point he began to analyze what he had become as a musician, referring to his image as a "monster" in an interview with Rolling Stone magazine. He also claimed, "Things were changing. Everybody was having to kiss everybody's ass. If you want to be on MTV, then come here and do this. All these backroom deals were getting made. I was like, 'I don't want any part of this.'"

Cash Box called it "a strident declaration that Mellencamp is not a pop singer" and said that "he drives the point home with a mean-spirited guitar growling across the track."

== Track listings ==
7-inch, cassette, and mini-CD single

A. "Pop Singer" – 2:45
B. "J.M.'s Question" – 3:38

12-inch single

A1. "Pop Singer"
B1. "J.M.'s Question"
B2. "Like a Rolling Stone" (live)

CD single

1. "Pop Singer"
2. "J.M.'s Question"
3. "Like a Rolling Stone" (live)
4. "Check It Out" (live)

== Charts ==
=== Weekly charts ===
Chart (1989)	Peak position
Australia (ARIA)	8
Canada Top Singles (RPM)	1
Italy Airplay (Music & Media)	8
New Zealand (Recorded Music NZ)	1
UK Singles (Official Charts)	93
US Billboard Hot 100	15
US Mainstream Rock (Billboard)	2
West Germany (GfK)	87

=== Year-end charts ===
Chart (1989)	Position
Australia (ARIA)	93
Canada Top Singles (RPM)	27
New Zealand (RIANZ)	37

== Release history ==
Region	Date	Format(s)	Label(s)	Ref.
United States	April 1989	7-inch vinyl; cassette	Mercury	
United Kingdom	May 22, 1989	7-inch vinyl; 12-inch vinyl; CD	Mercury	
