= List of top 10 singles for 2003 in Australia =

This is a list of singles that charted in the top ten of the ARIA Charts in 2003.

== Top-ten singles ==
Key

Symbol	Meaning
◁	Indicates single's top 10 entry was also its ARIA top 50 debut
(#)	2003 Year-end top 10 single position and rank

List of ARIA top ten singles that peaked in 2003
Top ten entry date	Single	Artist(s)	Peak	Peak date	Weeks in top ten	References
Singles from 2002
23 December	"Stole"	Kelly Rowland	2	20 January	10	
Singles from 2003
6 January	"Hey Sexy Lady"	Shaggy featuring Brian and Tony Gold	4	3 February	9	
6 January	"Thug Lovin'"	Ja Rule featuring Bobby Brown	7	20 January	7	
13 January	"Work It"	Missy Elliott	6	3 February	7	
20 January	"Naughty Girl" ◁	Holly Valance	3	20 January	6	
20 January	"'03 Bonnie & Clyde" ◁	Jay-Z featuring Beyoncé Knowles	2	3 February	8	
27 January	"Big Yellow Taxi"	Counting Crows featuring Vanessa Carlton	3	10 March	11	
10 February	"Be with You"	Atomic Kitten	10	10 February	1	
17 February	"Beautiful" ◁	Christina Aguilera	1	3 March	7	
24 February	"Nu Flow"	Big Brovaz	3	24 March	10	
3 March	"Cry Me a River" ◁	Justin Timberlake	2	3 March	3	
3 March	"Don't Know Why" ◁	Norah Jones	5	3 March	4	
3 March	"She Hates Me"	Puddle of Mudd	9	3 March	2	
3 March	"One of My Kind" ◁	Rogue Traders vs. INXS	10	3 March	1	
10 March	"Lost Without You" ◁	Delta Goodrem	1	10 March	12	
10 March	"Sing for the Moment" ◁	Eminem	5	10 March	5	
17 March	"All the Things She Said" ◁	T.A.T.u.	1	17 March	7	
17 March	"All I Have" ◁	Jennifer Lopez featuring LL Cool J	2	28 April	12	
17 March	"Mesmerize" ◁	Ja Rule featuring Ashanti	5	28 April	5	
24 March	"In da Club" ◁	50 Cent	1	7 April	16	
24 March	"Bump, Bump, Bump" ◁	B2K and P. Diddy	4	28 April	10	
31 March	"You Promised Me (Tu Es Foutu)"	In-Grid	7	7 April	6	
14 April	"Lovesong"	Amiel	6	5 May	5	
14 April	"Get the Music On"	Sophie Monk	10	14 April	1	
21 April	"True Colours" ◁	Kasey Chambers	4	5 May	4	
21 April	"American Life" ◁	Madonna	7	21 April	1	
5 May	"Bring Me to Life"	Evanescence	1	19 May	17	
5 May	"Stuck"	Stacie Orrico	3	2 June	8	
5 May	"Beautiful"	Snoop Dogg featuring Pharrell and Uncle Charlie Wilson	4	19 May	7	
12 May	"Rock Your Body" ◁	Justin Timberlake	1	12 May	6	
12 May	"Landslide"	Dixie Chicks	6	12 May	2	
26 May	"Rise & Fall" ◁	Craig David featuring Sting	6	26 May	3	
2 June	"United States of Whatever" ◁	Liam Lynch	6	2 June	6	
2 June	"Intuition" ◁	Jewel	4	23 June	9	
2 June	"Scandalous"	Mis-Teeq	9	2 June	2	
9 June	"Favourite Things" ◁	Big Brovaz	3	9 June	2	
16 June	"Innocent Eyes" ◁	Delta Goodrem	1	30 June	9	
16 June	"I Know What You Want" ◁	Busta Rhymes and Mariah Carey featuring The Flipmode Squad	3	16 June	9	
16 June	"Fighter" ◁	Christina Aguilera	5	16 June	3	
23 June	"On My Mind" ◁	Powderfinger	9	23 June	1	
23 June	"Falling"	Candice Alley	5	30 June	4	
30 June	"I'm Glad" ◁	Jennifer Lopez	10	30 June	1	
7 July	"21 Questions" ◁	50 Cent featuring Nate Dogg	4	7 July	7	
7 July	"Get Me Some" ◁	Mercury4	5	7 July	1	
7 July	"Reign" ◁	Ja Rule	5	18 August	11	
14 July	"Ignition (Remix)" ◁	R. Kelly	1	14 July	10	
14 July	"Crazy in Love" ◁	Beyoncé featuring Jay-Z	2	14 July	6	
14 July	"Hope"	David Campbell	8	14 July	1	
21 July	"Feel Good Time" ◁	Pink featuring William Orbit	7	21 July	2	
21 July	"Get Busy"	Sean Paul	4	18 August	7	
4 August	"Where Is the Love?" ◁	The Black Eyed Peas	1	25 August	19	
4 August	"Angel"	Amanda Perez	2	25 August	12	
18 August	"Miss Independent"	Kelly Clarkson	3	6 October	7	
18 August	"Shake Ya Tailfeather" ◁	Nelly, P. Diddy and Murphy Lee	3	15 September	13	
18 August	"Satisfaction"	Benny Benassi presents The Biz	10	18 August	2	
25 August	"Business" ◁	Eminem	4	1 September	4	
1 September	"Unchained Melody"	Gareth Gates	9	1 September	1	
8 September	"Rubberneckin' (Paul Oakenfold remix)" ◁	Elvis Presley	3	8 September	3	
8 September	"Señorita" ◁	Justin Timberlake	6	6 October	6	
8 September	"Someday" ◁	Nickelback	4	3 November	13	
15 September	"Right Thurr"	Chingy	6	15 September	5	
15 September	"Don't Say a Word"	Emmanuel Carella	7	15 September	1	
22 September	"White Flag" ◁	Dido	1	22 September	3	
22 September	"Not Me, Not I" ◁	Delta Goodrem	1	29 September	10	
22 September	"Can't Hold Us Down" ◁	Christina Aguilera featuring Lil' Kim	5	22 September	5	
6 October	"P.I.M.P." ◁	50 Cent	2	10 November	15	
13 October	"Baby Boy" ◁	Beyoncé featuring Sean Paul	3	17 November	14	
20 October	"Rise Up" ◁	Australian Idol - The Final 12	1	20 October	4	
27 October	"Breathe"	Blu Cantrell featuring Sean Paul	8	27 October	1	
27 October	"So Yesterday"	Hilary Duff	8	3 November	6	
3 November	"Into You"	Fabolous featuring Tamia	4	24 November	7	
3 November	"Trouble" ◁	Pink	8	24 November	3	
10 November	"Slow" ◁	Kylie Minogue	1	10 November	4	
17 November	"Me Against the Music" ◁	Britney Spears featuring Madonna	1	17 November	9	
1 December	"Angels Brought Me Here" ◁	Guy Sebastian	1	1 December	5	
1 December	"Shut Up" ◁	The Black Eyed Peas	1	29 December	13	
8 December	"Predictable" ◁	Delta Goodrem	1	22 December	8	
8 December	"Behind Blue Eyes" ◁	Limp Bizkit	4	29 December	14	

=== 2002 peaks ===
List of ARIA top ten singles in 2003 that peaked in 2002
Top ten entry date	Single	Artist(s)	Peak	Peak date	Weeks in top ten	References
14 October	"The Ketchup Song (Aserejé)" ◁	Las Ketchup	1	14 October	17	
21 October	"Dilemma" ◁	Nelly featuring Kelly Rowland	1	21 October	14	
21 October	"The Tide Is High (Get the Feeling)" ◁	Atomic Kitten	4	21 October	12	
18 November	"Born to Try" ◁	Delta Goodrem	1	2 December	15	
25 November	"Jenny from the Block" ◁	Jennifer Lopez featuring Jadakiss and Styles	5	30 December	8	
2 December	"Do It with Madonna"	The Androids	4	16 December	7	
9 December	"Lose Yourself" ◁	Eminem	1	9 December	14	

=== 2004 peaks ===
List of ARIA top ten singles in 2003 that peaked in 2004
Top ten entry date	Single	Artist(s)	Peak	Peak date	Weeks in top ten	References
8 December	"Hey Ya!"	Outkast	1	19 January	11	
15 December	"It's My Life"	No Doubt	7	12 January	6	
29 December	"Be Faithful"	Fatman Scoop featuring The Crooklyn Clan	5	12 January	6	
