= List of top 10 singles for 1988 in Australia =

This is a list of singles that charted in the top ten of the ARIA Charts in 1988.

== Top-ten singles ==
Key

Symbol	Meaning
◁	Indicates single's top 10 entry was also its ARIA top 50 debut

List of ARIA top ten singles that peaked in 1988
Top ten entry date	Single	Artist(s)	Peak	Peak date	Weeks in top ten	References
Singles from 1988
20 June	"The Flame"	Cheap Trick	1	20 June	7	
20 June	"What a Wonderful World"	Louis Armstrong	1	27 June	7	
20 June	"I Want You Back"	Bananarama	3	20 June	6	
20 June	"Blue Monday 1988"	New Order	4	20 June	4	
20 June	"Underneath the Radar"	Underworld	5	20 June	8	
20 June	"Pink Cadillac"	Natalie Cole	6	20 June	6	
20 June	"(Sittin' On) The Dock of the Bay"	Michael Bolton	7	20 June	3	
20 June	"Get Outta My Dreams, Get into My Car"	Billy Ocean	8	20 June	1	
20 June	"New Sensation"	INXS	9	20 June	2	
20 June	"When Will I Be Famous?"	Bros	10	20 June	1	
27 June	"Better Be Home Soon"	Crowded House	2	11 July	12	
27 June	"Fast Car"	Tracy Chapman	4	27 June	7	
27 June	"I Saw Him Standing There"	Tiffany	10	27 June	1	
4 July	"Got to Be Certain" ◁	Kylie Minogue	1	4 July	9	
11 July	"Drop the Boy"	Bros	9	11 July	1	
18 July	"Age of Reason" ◁	John Farnham	1	25 July	11	
18 July	"Wanna Be Up"	Chantoozies	6	25 July	9	
25 July	"Motor's Too Fast"	James Reyne	6	8 August	4	
1 August	"Perfect"	Fairground Attraction	1	22 August	11	
1 August	"Simply Irresistible"	Robert Palmer	1	12 September	15	
8 August	"I Owe You Nothing" ◁	Bros	6	15 August	5	
15 August	"Doctorin' the Tardis" ◁	The Timelords	2	26 September	10	
15 August	"Don't Be Cruel"	Cheap Trick	4	12 September	9	
5 September	"All Fired Up"	Pat Benatar	2	3 October	9	
5 September	"Wild World"	Maxi Priest	8	5 September	1	
5 September	"Nothin' But a Good Time"	Poison	10	5 September	3	
12 September	"Hole in My Heart (All the Way to China)"	Cyndi Lauper	8	12 September	1	
12 September	"That's When I Think of You"	1927	6	26 September	5	
19 September	"Push It"	Salt-N-Pepa	3	17 October	7	
26 September	"Make Me Lose Control"	Eric Carmen	8	3 October	4	
3 October	"Oh Yeah"	Yello	9	3 October	2	
10 October	"Desire" ◁	U2	1	17 October	8	
10 October	"Two Strong Hearts"	John Farnham	6	17 October	4	
17 October	"Bad Medicine"	Bon Jovi	4	17 October	6	
17 October	"The Only Way Is Up"	Yazz & the Plastic Population	2	24 October	15	
17 October	"A Groovy Kind of Love"	Phil Collins	2	31 October	13	
24 October	"Don't Worry, Be Happy" ◁	Bobby McFerrin	1	7 November	13	
31 October	"Nothing Can Divide Us" ◁	Jason Donovan	3	21 November	10	
31 October	"Wild, Wild West"	The Escape Club	6	28 November	6	
7 November	"So Excellent"/"I Go, I Go"	Kylie Mole	8	7 November	3	
14 November	"When a Man Loves a Woman"	Jimmy Barnes	3	28 November	7	
14 November	"I Want Your Love"	Transvision Vamp	7	12 December	9	
28 November	"If I Could"	1927	4	19 December	13	
28 November	"Bring Me Some Water"	Melissa Etheridge	9	12 December	5	
12 December	"Don't Need Love"	Johnny Diesel and the Injectors	10	12 December	1	

=== 1989 peaks ===
List of ARIA top ten singles in 1988 that peaked in 1989
Top ten entry date	Single	Artist(s)	Peak	Peak date	Weeks in top ten	References
5 December	"Kokomo"	The Beach Boys	1	2 January	15	
19 December	"Handle with Care"	Traveling Wilburys	3	9 January	11	
