= List of top 10 albums for 2016 in Australia =

This is a list of albums that charted in the top ten on the ARIA Album Charts, an all-genre albums chart, in 2016.

== Top-ten albums ==
An asterisk (*) represents that the album is in the top ten as of the week ending on 18 December 2017.

Key

(#) - 2016 Year-end top 10 album position and rank

Top 10 Entry date	Albums		Peak		Total weeks in the top 10	References
Top 10 Entry date	Title	Artist(s)	Position	Date	Total weeks in the top 10	References
Albums from 1993
20 September	The Hits/The B-Sides ^{[G]}	Prince	4	2 May (2016)	4	
Albums from 2003
1 December	Greatest Hits	Red Hot Chili Peppers	2	1 December	17	
Albums from 2011
7 November	Christmas (#5)	Michael Bublé	1	5 December	45*	
Albums from 2014
2 June	In the Lonely Hour	Sam Smith	1	27 April (2015)	52	
30 June	X	Ed Sheeran	1	30 June	104	
3 November	1989	Taylor Swift	1	3 November	70	
Albums from 2015
31 August	Immortalized	Disturbed	1	31 August	7	
7 September	Beauty Behind the Madness	The Weeknd	1	7 September	12	
9 November	If I Can Dream	Elvis Presley and the Royal Philharmonic Orchestra	1	9 November	12	
23 November	Purpose (#9)	Justin Bieber	1	23 November	22	
23 November	Made in the A.M.	One Direction	2	23 November	5	
30 November	25 (#1)	Adele	1	30 November	71	
14 December	A Head Full of Dreams	Coldplay	2	14 December	10	
28 December	Jess & Matt	Jess & Matt	9	28 December	2	
Albums from 2016
11 January	Molly ^{[S]} (#4)	Various Artists	1	15 February	16	
18 January	Blackstar (#8)	David Bowie	1	18 January	7	
18 January	Nothing Has Changed ^{[G]}	David Bowie	3	18 January	7	
18 January	Adam Brand and the Outlaws	Adam Brand and the Outlaws	6	18 January	1	
18 January	Best of Bowie ^{[G]}	David Bowie	6	25 January	2	
25 January	Death of a Bachelor	Panic! at the Disco	3	25 January	1	
1 February	Bloom	Rüfüs	1	1 February	5	
1 February	Dystopia	Megadeth	6	1 February	1	
1 February	The Complete Greatest Hits ^{[G]}	The Eagles	10	1 February	1	
8 February	This Is Acting	Sia	1	8 February	5	
8 February	Anti	Rihanna	5	8 February	2	
8 February	Nine Track Mind	Charlie Puth	8	8 February	2	
8 February	The Astonishing	Dream Theater	10	8 February	1	
22 February	Synthia	The Jezabels	4	22 February	1	
22 February	Time of My Life	Ronan Keating	6	22 February	1	
29 February	Drinking from the Sun, Walking Under Stars Restrung	Hilltop Hoods	1	29 February	9	
29 February	Phase	Jack Garratt	9	29 February	1	
7 March	I Like It When You Sleep, for You Are So Beautiful yet So Unaware of It	The 1975	1	7 March	1	
7 March	Youth Revival	Hillsong Young & Free	3	7 March	2	
7 March	This Unruly Mess I've Made	Macklemore & Ryan Lewis	6	7 March	6	
7 March	Dissonants	Hands Like Houses	7	7 March	1	
7 March	Hills End	DMA's	8	7 March	1	
14 March	Rising with the Sun	The Cat Empire	1	14 March	2	
14 March	Untitled Unmastered	Kendrick Lamar	3	14 March	1	
14 March	Limitless	Tonight Alive	6	14 March	1	
14 March	The Past Beats Inside Me Like a Second Heartbeat	Urthboy	7	14 March	1	
21 March	Telluric	Matt Corby	1	21 March	4	
21 March	You and I	Jeff Buckley	2	21 March	2	
21 March	Incarnate	Killswitch Engage	5	21 March	1	
21 March	Have It All	Bethel Music	8	21 March	1	
28 March	Waco	Violent Soho	1	28 March	2	
28 March	This Is What the Truth Feels Like	Gwen Stefani	6	28 March	1	
28 March	Post Pop Depression	Iggy Pop	7	28 March	1	
4 April	Mind of Mine	Zayn	1	4 April	2	
4 April	The Black	Asking Alexandria	4	4 April	1	
4 April	Beautiful Lies	Birdy	10	4 April	1	
11 April	Lukas Graham	Lukas Graham	1	11 April	3	
11 April	Metal Resistance	Babymetal	7	11 April	1	
11 April	Everything You've Come to Expect	The Last Shadow Puppets	9	11 April	1	
18 April	Gore	Deftones	1	18 April	1	
18 April	Cleopatra	The Lumineers	2	18 April	1	
25 April	The Hope Six Demolition Project	PJ Harvey	7	25 April	1	
25 April	Together	Marina Prior and Mark Vincent	5	9 May	3	
2 May	Lemonade (#3)	Beyoncé	1	2 May	16	
2 May	The Very Best of Prince ^{[G]}	Prince	2	2 May	5	
2 May	Classic Carpenters	Dami Im	3	2 May	6	
2 May	Purple Rain	Prince and The Revolution	5	2 May	1	
2 May	Ultimate Prince ^{[G]}	Prince	6	2 May	1	
2 May	Seven Sonnets & a Song	Paul Kelly	9	2 May	1	
9 May	Views	Drake	1	9 May	10	
9 May	The Electric Warlock Acid Witch Satanic Orgy Celebration Dispenser	Rob Zombie	8	9 May	1	
9 May	Prayers for the Damned	Sixx:A.M.	9	9 May	1	
9 May	Stages Live	Josh Groban	10	9 May	1	
16 May	Ripcord (#2)	Keith Urban	1	16 May	26	
16 May	A Moon Shaped Pool	Radiohead	2	16 May	5	
16 May	Anthology	Kate Ceberano	9	16 May	1	
23 May	Thank You	Meghan Trainor	3	23 May	8	
23 May	Shift	The Living End	4	23 May	1	
23 May	Strange Loop	Paul Dempsey	5	23 May	1	
23 May	Eurovision Song Contest 2016 ^{[S]}	Various Artists	9	23 May	1	
30 May	Dangerous Woman	Ariana Grande	1	30 May	2	
30 May	I Still Do	Eric Clapton	10	30 May	1	
6 June	Skin	Flume	1	6 June	6	
6 June	All Our Gods Have Abandoned Us	Architects	2	6 June	1	
6 June	The Ride	Catfish and the Bottlemen	6	6 June	1	
6 June	7/27	Fifth Harmony	8	6 June	1	
13 June	Soul Searchin'	Jimmy Barnes	1	13 June	3	
13 June	This Crazy Life	The Wolfe Brothers	10	13 June	1	
20 June	Thick as Thieves	The Temper Trap	1	20 June	1	
20 June	Strange Little Birds	Garbage	9	20 June	1	
27 June	The Getaway	Red Hot Chili Peppers	1	27 June	6	
4 July	Conscious	Broods	2	4 July	1	
11 July	Wings of the Wild	Delta Goodrem	1	11 July	6	
11 July	California	Blink-182	2	11 July	5	
11 July	The Speed of Sound	In Stereo	3	11 July	1	
11 July	Christine and the Queens	Christine and the Queens	8	11 July	1	
18 July	Wildflower	The Avalanches	1	18 July	4	
18 July	Of Dirt and Grace: Live from the Land	Hillsong Worship	8	18 July	2	
18 July	Blank Face LP	Schoolboy Q	9	18 July	1	
25 July	Youth Authority	Good Charlotte	1	25 July	1	
25 July	A Version of Now	Peter Garrett	3	25 July	1	
1 August	Gimme Some Lovin': Jukebox Vol II	Human Nature	1	1 August	9	
1 August	Periphery III: Select Difficulty	Periphery	8	1 August	1	
8 August	Let Me Be Clear	Gang of Youths	2	8 August	1	
8 August	Opera Oblivia	Hellions	4	8 August	1	
8 August	Zenith	Alfie Arcuri	5	8 August	1	
8 August	Major Key	DJ Khaled	6	8 August	1	
15 August	Suicide Squad (#10) ^{[S]}	Various Artists	1	15 August	14	
15 August	Civil Dusk	Bernard Fanning	2	15 August	3	
15 August	Glorious Heights	Montaigne	4	15 August	1	
15 August	Unleashed	Skillet	7	15 August	1	
15 August	Way Down in the Jungle Room	Elvis Presley	9	15 August	1	
15 August	Encore	DJ Snake	10	15 August	1	
22 August	This Could Be Heartbreak	The Amity Affliction	1	22 August	2	
22 August	Blurryface	Twenty One Pilots	7	22 August	1	
29 August	Blonde	Frank Ocean	1	29 August	3	
29 August	Every Night the Same Dream	Ball Park Music	3	29 August	1	
29 August	Seven Mirrors	Drapht	4	29 August	1	
29 August	This Sporting Life	Roy and HG	6	29 August	3	
29 August	Pure & Simple	Dolly Parton	9	29 August	1	
5 September	Encore: Movie Partners Sing Broadway	Barbra Streisand	1	5 September	5	
5 September	Glory	Britney Spears	4	5 September	1	
5 September	Things I Carry Around	Troy Cassar-Daley	5	5 September	1	
5 September	Outlier	Twelve Foot Ninja	6	5 September	1	
5 September	Dig Your Roots	Florida Georgia Line	7	5 September	1	
12 September	Bad Vibrations	A Day to Remember	1	12 September	1	
12 September	Animal	Big Scary	5	12 September	1	
12 September	His Favourite Collection ^{[G]}	John Williamson	9	12 September	1	
12 September	Birds in the Trap Sing McKnight	Travis Scott	10	12 September	1	
19 September	Skeleton Tree	Nick Cave and the Bad Seeds	1	19 September	3	
19 September	Internal	Safia	2	19 September	1	
19 September	The Complete Trio Collection	Dolly Parton, Emmylou Harris and Linda Ronstadt	3	19 September	4	
19 September	They Don't Know	Jason Aldean	5	19 September	1	
19 September	Wild World	Bastille	7	19 September	1	
19 September	The Beatles at the Hollywood Bowl	The Beatles	8	19 September	1	
19 September	Transcendence	Devin Townsend Project	10	19 September	1	
26 September	Backbone	Anthony Callea	1	26 September	2	
26 September	Hard II Love	Usher	5	26 September	1	
26 September	Bridget Jones's Baby ^{[S]}	Various Artists	7	26 September	1	
26 September	Mount Ninji and da Nice Time Kid	Die Antwoord	9	26 September	1	
26 September	Divas and Demons	Remi	10	26 September	1	
3 October	Young as the Morning, Old as the Sea	Passenger	1	3 October	2	
3 October	Chapter and Verse	Bruce Springsteen	2	3 October	2	
3 October	Illuminate	Shawn Mendes	3	3 October	2	
3 October	Dream Lover: The Bobby Darin Musical	David Campbell	9	3 October	1	
10 October	Westway (The Glitter & the Slums)	Sticky Fingers	1	10 October	2	
10 October	22, A Million	Bon Iver	2	10 October	1	
10 October	Sorceress	Opeth	7	10 October	1	
10 October	The Altar	Banks	8	10 October	1	
17 October	Triple J Like a Version 12	Various Artists	1	17 October	5	
17 October	Revolution Radio	Green Day	2	17 October	2	
17 October	In the Now	Barry Gibb	3	17 October	4	
17 October	Day Breaks	Norah Jones	4	17 October	2	
17 October	The Last Hero	Alter Bridge	6	17 October	1	
17 October	Oh My My	OneRepublic	8	17 October	1	
17 October	The Violent Sleep of Reason	Meshuggah	9	17 October	1	
24 October	The Secret Daughter (#7) ^{[S]}	Jessica Mauboy	1	24 October	11	
24 October	Let There Be Light	Hillsong Worship	2	24 October	1	
24 October	Walls	Kings of Leon	3	24 October	2	
24 October	Chemical Miracle	Trophy Eyes	8	24 October	1	
24 October	Warriors	Lisa Mitchell	9	24 October	1	
31 October	Joanne	Lady Gaga	2	31 October	2	
31 October	Nobody but Me	Michael Bublé	2	7 November	4	
31 October	The Wonder of You	Elvis Presley	3	7 November	5	
31 October	The Serenity of Suffering	Korn	5	31 October	1	
31 October	You Want It Darker	Leonard Cohen	2	21 November	4	
31 October	Lifelines	I Prevail	8	31 October	1	
7 November	The Stage	Avenged Sevenfold	4	7 November	1	
7 November	Two Vines	Empire of the Sun	7	7 November	1	
7 November	Back from the Edge	James Arthur	8	7 November	1	
14 November	This House Is Not for Sale	Bon Jovi	1	14 November	2	
14 November	Brace	Birds of Tokyo	3	14 November	1	
14 November	The Heavy Entertainment Show	Robbie Williams	4	14 November	4	
14 November	Don't Look Down	Pez	7	14 November	1	
21 November	Two Degrees	Illy	1	21 November	1	
21 November	Friends for Christmas (#6) ^{[C]}	John Farnham and Olivia Newton-John	1	19 December	11*	
21 November	The Singles ^{[G]}	Phil Collins	6	21 November	1	
21 November	57th & 9th	Sting	9	21 November	1	
28 November	Hardwired... to Self-Destruct	Metallica	1	28 November	6	
28 November	Glory Days	Little Mix	2	28 November	1	
28 November	24K Magic	Bruno Mars	3	28 November	9	
28 November	Tradition	Kerser	4	28 November	1	
5 December	Starboy	The Weeknd	1	5 December	5	
5 December	The Very Very Best of Crowded House ^{[G]}	Crowded House	5	5 December	1	
5 December	Reclaim Australia	A.B. Original	10	5 December	1	
12 December	Blue & Lonesome	The Rolling Stones	1	12 December	8	
12 December	"Awaken, My Love!"	Childish Gambino	9	12 December	1	
19 December	4 Your Eyez Only	J. Cole	6	19 December	1	
19 December	Trolls ^{[S]}	Various Artists	1	9 January (2017)	19	

== Notes ==
^{C} It is a Christmas album
^{G} It is a greatest hits album.
^{S} It is a soundtrack of a film/TV series/etc.
