= List of top 10 singles for 2004 in Australia =

This is a list of singles that charted in the top ten of the ARIA Charts in 2004.

== Top-ten singles ==
Key

Symbol	Meaning
◁	Indicates single's top 10 entry was also its ARIA top 50 debut
(#)	2004 Year-end top 10 single position and rank

List of ARIA top ten singles that peaked in 2004
Top ten entry date	Single	Artist(s)	Peak	Peak date	Weeks in top ten	References
Singles from 2003
8 December	"Hey Ya!"	Outkast	1	19 January	11	
15 December	"It's My Life"	No Doubt	7	12 January	6	
29 December	"Be Faithful"	Fatman Scoop featuring The Crooklyn Clan	5	12 January	6	
Singles from 2004
5 January	"Baby Boy"	Big Brovaz	8	12 January	4	
19 January	"Milkshake" (#4) ◁	Kelis	2	19 January	10	
19 January	"My Immortal" (#7) ◁	Evanescence	4	19 January	11	
19 January	"Numb"	Linkin Park	10	19 January	1	
26 January	"Here Without You" ◁	3 Doors Down	2	26 January	7	
26 January	"The Voice Within" ◁	Christina Aguilera	8	2 February	3	
2 February	"What About Me" (#1) ◁	Shannon Noll	1	2 February	8	
2 February	"Superstar" (#6)	Jamelia	1	8 March	12	
9 February	"What Chu Want"	The J-Wess Project	10	9 February	1	
16 February	"Turn Me On" ◁	Kevin Lyttle featuring Spragga Benz	3	22 March	8	
16 February	"Figured You Out"	Nickelback	10	16 February	2	
23 February	"So Beautiful"	Pete Murray	9	23 February	5	
1 March	"All I Need Is You" ◁	Guy Sebastian	1	1 March	4	
1 March	"Somebody to Love"	Boogie Pimps	10	1 March	1	
8 March	"Red Blooded Woman" ◁	Kylie Minogue	4	8 March	1	
8 March	"Amazing" ◁	George Michael	6	15 March	2	
15 March	"Toxic" ◁	Britney Spears	1	15 March	6	
15 March	"The Way You Move" ◁	Outkast featuring Sleepy Brown	7	22 March	4	
22 March	"Hey Mama" ◁	The Black Eyed Peas	4	22 March	7	
22 March	"Suga Suga" (#10)	Baby Bash featuring Frankie J	3	5 April	10	
29 March	"Yeah!" ◁	Usher featuring Ludacris and Lil Jon	1	29 March	5	
29 March	"I Don't Want You Back" (#5) ◁	Eamon	1	5 April	7	
29 March	"Left Outside Alone" (#2)	Anastacia	1	10 May	13	
5 April	"Take Me to the Clouds Above" ◁	LMC vs. U2	7	5 April	1	
5 April	"Black Betty" (#3)	Spiderbait	1	24 May	12	
19 April	"With You"	Jessica Simpson	4	24 May	8	
26 April	"My Band" ◁	D12 featuring Eminem	1	3 May	7	
26 April	"Drive" ◁	Shannon Noll	4	26 April	6	
26 April	"Don't Tell Me" ◁	Avril Lavigne	10	26 April	1	
3 May	"This Love"	Maroon 5	8	3 May	2	
3 May	"Naughty Girl" ◁	Beyonce	9	3 May	4	
10 May	"When You Say You Love Me"	Human Nature	7	10 May	3	
10 May	"Thank You"	Jamelia	7	24 May	4	
17 May	"One Call Away"	Chingy featuring J. Weav	5	24 May	6	
24 May	"The Reason" ◁	Hoobastank	7	7 June	5	
31 May	"I Don't Wanna Know" ◁	Mario Winans featuring Enya and P. Diddy	2	14 June	8	
7 June	"Roses" ◁	Outkast	2	7 June	6	
7 June	"Trick Me" ◁	Kelis	5	7 June	8	
7 June	"Ms. Vanity" ◁	Rob Mills	6	7 June	1	
14 June	"F.U.R.B." ◁	Frankee	1	14 June	6	
14 June	"Tipsy" ◁	J-Kwon	5	14 June	6	
14 June	"Perfect"	Simple Plan	6	12 July	6	
21 June	"Burn" ◁	Usher	2	19 July	8	
28 June	"Everytime" ◁	Britney Spears	1	28 June	2	
28 June	"Heartbreaker" ◁	Kayne Taylor	8	28 June	1	
28 June	"Let's Get It Started" ◁	The Black Eyed Peas	2	26 July	7	
5 July	"Four to the Floor"	Starsailor	5	9 August	6	
12 July	"Learn to Fly" ◁	Shannon Noll	1	12 July	3	
12 July	"Angel Eyes" ◁	Paulini	1	19 July	9	
19 July	"Push Up"	Freestylers	2	2 August	4	
26 July	"I Believe" ◁	Fantasia	4	26 July	4	
26 July	"How Come" ◁	D12	4	2 August	5	
2 August	"My Happy Ending"	Avril Lavigne	6	9 August	7	
9 August	"Scar EP" ◁	Missy Higgins	1	9 August	11	
9 August	"Sick and Tired"	Anastacia	8	9 August	5	
16 August	"When the War Is Over" / "One Night Without You" ◁	Cosima	1	16 August	7	
16 August	"Broken" ◁	Seether featuring Amy Lee	3	6 September	10	
16 August	"Summer Rain" ◁	Slinkee Minx	5	16 August	5	
23 August	"Popular" ◁	Darren Hayes	3	23 August	1	
23 August	"She Will Be Loved" ◁	Maroon 5	1	6 September	12	
23 August	"Pieces of Me"	Ashlee Simpson	7	20 September	5	
30 August	"My Place" ◁	Nelly featuring Jaheim	1	30 August	7	
30 August	"Leave (Get Out)" ◁	JoJo	2	30 August	10	
20 September	"American Idiot" ◁	Green Day	7	4 October	7	
20 September	"Addicted"	Simple Plan	10	20 September	1	
27 September	"Confessions Part II" ◁	Usher	5	27 September	3	
27 September	"Our Lips Are Sealed"	Hilary and Haylie Duff	8	27 September	1	
4 October	"Out with My Baby" ◁	Guy Sebastian	1	4 October	4	
4 October	"These Kids" (#8) ◁	Joel Turner & the Modern Day Poets	1	29 November	15	
4 October	"Breakaway"	Kelly Clarkson	10	4 October	2	
11 October	"Car Wash" ◁	Christina Aguilera and Missy Elliott	2	11 October	6	
11 October	"These Words" ◁	Natasha Bedingfield	5	1 November	8	
18 October	"Out of the Blue" ◁	Delta Goodrem	1	18 October	9	
25 October	"Call on Me" ◁	Eric Prydz	2	25 October	7	
1 November	"My My My" ◁	Armand Van Helden	6	1 November	2	
8 November	"Just Lose It" ◁	Eminem	1	8 November	8	
8 November	"Lose My Breath" ◁	Destiny's Child	3	22 November	11	
8 November	"Welcome to My Life"	Simple Plan	7	20 December	7	
15 November	"What You Waiting For?" ◁	Gwen Stefani	1	15 November	10	
15 November	"Vertigo" ◁	U2	5	15 November	1	
15 November	"My Prerogative" ◁	Britney Spears	7	15 November	1	
22 November	"Tilt Ya Head Back" ◁	Nelly featuring Christina Aguilera	5	22 November	9	
22 November	"Pointless Relationship" ◁	Tammin	5	29 November	3	
6 December	"Listen with Your Heart" ◁	Casey Donovan	1	6 December	5	
6 December	"I Believe in You" ◁	Kylie Minogue	6	6 December	1	
13 December	"Do They Know It's Christmas?" ◁	Band Aid 20	9	13 December	1	
20 December	"The Prayer" ◁	Anthony Callea	1	20 December	9	
27 December	"C'mon Aussie C'mon" ◁	Shannon Noll	2	27 December	4	

=== 2003 peaks ===
List of ARIA top ten singles in 2004 that peaked in 2003
Top ten entry date	Single	Artist(s)	Peak	Peak date	Weeks in top ten	References
6 October	"P.I.M.P." ◁	50 Cent	2	10 November	15	
13 October	"Baby Boy" ◁	Beyonce featuring Sean Paul	3	17 November	14	
17 November	"Me Against the Music" ◁	Britney Spears featuring Madonna	1	17 November	9	
1 December	"Shut Up" (#9) ◁	The Black Eyed Peas	1	29 December	13	
8 December	"Predictable" ◁	Delta Goodrem	1	22 December	8	
8 December	"Behind Blue Eyes" ◁	Limp Bizkit	4	29 December	14	

=== 2005 peaks ===
List of ARIA top ten singles in 2004 that peaked in 2005
Top ten entry date	Single	Artist(s)	Peak	Peak date	Weeks in top ten	References
20 December	"Numb/Encore" ◁	Jay-Z and Linkin Park	3	17 January	10	
20 December	"Boulevard of Broken Dreams" ◁	Green Day	5	10 January	7	
