= List of top 10 singles for 1990 in Australia =

This is a list of singles that charted in the top ten of the ARIA Charts in 1990.

== Top-ten singles ==
Key

Symbol	Meaning
◁	Indicates single's top 10 entry was also its ARIA top 50 debut
(#)	1990 Year-end top 10 single position and rank

List of ARIA top ten singles that peaked in 1990
Top ten entry date	Single	Artist(s)	Peak	Peak date	Weeks in top ten	References
Singles from 1989
13 November	"I Feel the Earth Move"	Martika	2	8 January	12	
27 November	"Love Shack" (#10)	The B-52s	1	1 January	13	
4 December	"Leave a Light On"	Belinda Carlisle	5	15 January	9	
Singles from 1990
1 January	"I Want That Man"	Deborah Harry	2	15 January	7	
1 January	"Ride on Time"	Black Box	2	29 January	9	
8 January	"Pump Up the Jam"	Technotronic featuring Felly	4	12 February	7	
15 January	"Crying in the Chapel"	Peter Blakeley	3	12 February	10	
15 January	"When I See You Smile"	Bad English	4	29 January	9	
22 January	"Janie's Got a Gun"	Aerosmith	1	12 February	8	
29 January	"Girl I'm Gonna Miss You" (#9)	Milli Vanilli	3	12 March	10	
5 February	"Black Velvet"	Alannah Myles	3	19 February	12	
5 February	"Blue Sky Mine" ◁	Midnight Oil	8	19 March	6	
12 February	"All Around the World"	Lisa Stansfield	9	12 February	1	
19 February	"Nothing Compares 2 U" (#1)	Sinéad O'Connor	1	19 February	13	
19 February	"Don't Know Much"	Linda Ronstadt featuring Aaron Neville	2	26 February	11	
26 February	"How Am I Supposed to Live Without You" (#7)	Michael Bolton	2	5 March	13	
5 March	"Sacrifice"	Elton John	7	19 March	4	
19 March	"Love and Kisses"	Dannii Minogue	4	9 April	8	
19 March	"Blame It on the Rain"	Milli Vanilli	5	9 April	7	
26 March	"Opposites Attract" (#6)	Paula Abdul	1	16 April	11	
2 April	"Get Up! (Before the Night Is Over)"	Technotronic	7	16 April	6	
2 April	"I Don't Know Anybody Else"	Black Box	6	23 April	7	
9 April	"Lambada"	Kaoma	5	30 April	5	
30 April	"Vogue" (#3)	Madonna	1	30 April	9	
7 May	"How Can We Be Lovers"	Michael Bolton	3	14 May	6	
7 May	"Summer Rain"	Belinda Carlisle	6	14 May	5	
14 May	"Mona"	Craig McLachlan and Check 1-2	3	21 May	7	
14 May	"All I Wanna Do Is Make Love to You" (#5)	Heart	1	4 June	11	
14 May	"Sweet Surrender"	Wet Wet Wet	7	14 May	3	
14 May	"Dangerous"	Roxette	9	21 May	3	
28 May	"Infinity (1990's... Time for the Guru)"	Guru Josh	4	25 June	9	
28 May	"Cradle of Love"	Billy Idol	10	28 May	2	
4 June	"Better the Devil You Know" ◁	Kylie Minogue	4	18 June	6	
4 June	"Step by Step"	New Kids on the Block	8	11 June	7	
4 June	"I Need Your Body"	Tina Arena	3	18 June	8	
11 June	"It Must Have Been Love" (#4)	Roxette	1	2 July	10	
18 June	"I Don't Want to Be with Nobody but You"	Absent Friends featuring Wendy Matthews	4	16 July	9	
18 June	"Spin That Wheel"	Hi Tek 3 featuring Ya Kid K	5	23 July	7	
25 June	"Hold On"	Wilson Phillips	2	9 July	8	
2 July	"U Can't Touch This" (#2)	MC Hammer	1	16 July	14	
16 July	"Unskinny Bop"	Poison	7	30 July	5	
23 July	"Lay Down Your Guns" ◁	Jimmy Barnes	4	6 August	11	
30 July	"Show No Mercy"	Mark Williams	8	30 July	5	
30 July	"Joey"	Concrete Blonde	2	27 August	10	
30 July	"Epic"	Faith No More	1	20 August	10	
6 August	"Hanky Panky"	Madonna	6	13 August	5	
13 August	"Blaze of Glory" ◁	Jon Bon Jovi	1	10 September	13	
20 August	"Chain Reaction"	John Farnham	6	27 August	9	
20 August	"She Ain't Worth It"	Glenn Medeiros featuring Bobby Brown	8	27 August	5	
27 August	"Close to You"	Maxi Priest	2	17 September	9	
10 September	"Suicide Blonde" ◁	INXS	2	8 October	8	
10 September	"Vision of Love"	Mariah Carey	9	17 September	4	
24 September	"Bust a Move"	Young MC	1	22 October	9	
1 October	"King of Wishful Thinking"	Go West	6	8 October	5	
8 October	"Ooops Up"	Snap!	4	5 November	6	
8 October	"Thunderstruck"	AC/DC	4	29 October	6	
8 October	"That's Freedom"	John Farnham	6	29 October	5	
15 October	"Jukebox in Siberia"	Skyhooks	1	29 October	8	
22 October	"Groove Is in the Heart"	Deee-Lite	1	12 November	11	
29 October	"Black Cat"	Janet Jackson	6	5 November	4	
5 November	"Heart in Danger"	Southern Sons	5	5 November	4	
5 November	"Doin' the Do"	Betty Boo	3	12 November	9	
12 November	"Unchained Melody" (#8)	The Righteous Brothers	1	19 November	15	
12 November	"I'll Be Your Shelter"	Taylor Dayne	4	19 November	4	
19 November	"Tom's Diner"	DNA featuring Suzanne Vega	8	19 November	2	
19 November	"Lily Was Here"	David A. Stewart featuring Candy Dulfer	10	19 November	1	
26 November	"I'm Your Baby Tonight"	Whitney Houston	7	26 November	1	
26 November	"Step Back in Time" ◁	Kylie Minogue	5	3 December	8	
3 December	"Show Me Heaven"	Maria McKee	3	17 December	11	
3 December	"Burn for You"	John Farnham	5	17 December	6	
3 December	"Justify My Love"	Madonna	4	10 December	7	
10 December	"Miracle"	Jon Bon Jovi	8	10 December	4	

=== 1989 peaks ===
List of ARIA top ten singles in 1990 that peaked in 1989
Top ten entry date	Single	Artist(s)	Peak	Peak date	Weeks in top ten	References
25 September	"If I Could Turn Back Time"	Cher	1	9 October	18	
25 September	"Poison"	Alice Cooper	3	23 October	15	
2 October	"Swing the Mood" ◁	Jive Bunny and the Mastermixers	1	16 October	15	
30 October	"We Didn't Start the Fire"	Billy Joel	2	27 November	12	
27 November	"That's What I Like" ◁	Jive Bunny and the Mastermixers	4	27 November	7	

=== 1991 peaks ===
List of ARIA top ten singles in 1990 that peaked in 1991
Top ten entry date	Single	Artist(s)	Peak	Peak date	Weeks in top ten	References
26 November	"Ice Ice Baby"	Vanilla Ice	1	7 January	14	
10 December	"Cherry Pie"	Warrant	6	7 January	9	
