= List of top 10 singles for 2001 in Australia =

This is a list of singles that charted in the top ten of the ARIA Charts in 2001.

== Top-ten singles ==
Key

Symbol	Meaning
◁	Indicates single's top 10 entry was also its ARIA top 50 debut
(#)	2001 Year-end top 10 single position and rank

List of ARIA top ten singles that peaked in 2001
Top ten entry date	Single	Artist(s)	Peak	Peak date	Weeks in top ten	References
Singles from 2000
4 December	"7 Days"	Craig David	4	1 January	10	
11 December	"Cruisin'"	Gwyneth Paltrow and Huey Lewis	1	8 January	11	
18 December	"The Itch"	Vitamin C	6	8 January	8	
18 December	"Original Prankster"	The Offspring	5	1 January	7	
Singles from 2001
1 January	"Dance with Me"	Debelah Morgan	3	22 January	10	
1 January	"The Power"/"Every Time I Close My Eyes"	Vanessa Amorosi	8	1 January	2	
15 January	"Can't Fight the Moonlight" (#1)	LeAnn Rimes	1	22 January	13	
15 January	"Stan" (#6) ◁	Eminem featuring Dido	1	5 March	15	
22 January	"Love Don't Cost a Thing" ◁	Jennifer Lopez	4	22 January	6	
5 February	"Yellow"	Coldplay	5	19 February	8	
12 February	"Case of the Ex" ◁	Mýa	1	12 March	11	
12 February	"One Step Closer"	Linkin Park	4	26 February	7	
19 February	"Stuck in a Moment You Can't Get Out Of" ◁	U2	3	19 February	2	
19 February	"Kryptonite"	3 Doors Down	8	19 February	3	
26 February	"Operation Blade (Bass in the Place)"	Public Domain	7	26 March	7	
5 March	"The Hampsterdance Song"	Hampton the Hampster	5	12 March	3	
5 March	"Ms. Jackson" ◁	Outkast	2	26 March	10	
5 March	"Nobody Wants to Be Lonely" ◁	Ricky Martin and Christina Aguilera	8	5 March	1	
12 March	"It Wasn't Me" (#2)	Shaggy featuring Ricardo 'RikRok' Ducent	1	26 March	14	
12 March	"Reminiscing" ◁	Madison Avenue	9	12 March	1	
19 March	"You All Dat"	Baha Men	8	19 March	1	
26 March	"I'm Like a Bird" (#7)	Nelly Furtado	2	14 May	12	
26 March	"Walking Away"	Craig David	5	2 April	10	
2 April	"Bette Davis Eyes" ◁	Gwyneth Paltrow	3	2 April	9	
2 April	"One More Time"	Daft Punk	10	2 April	1	
9 April	"All for You" ◁	Janet Jackson	5	9 April	2	
16 April	"Survivor" ◁	Destiny's Child	7	16 April	2	
16 April	"Butterfly"	Crazy Town	4	11 June	12	
23 April	"Me, Myself & I" ◁	Scandal'us	1	23 April	7	
23 April	"Whole Again" (#10)	Atomic Kitten	2	28 May	11	
30 April	"Lady Marmalade" ◁	Christina Aguilera, Lil' Kim, Mýa and Pink	1	14 May	8	
30 April	"What It Feels Like for a Girl" ◁	Madonna	6	30 April	3	
14 May	"Bow Wow (That's My Name)"	Lil Bow Wow	6	28 May	7	
28 May	"With Arms Wide Open"	Creed	4	18 June	10	
4 June	"Angel" (#4) ◁	Shaggy featuring Rayvon	1	4 June	10	
4 June	"It's Raining Men" ◁	Geri Halliwell	4	9 July	8	
11 June	"Free"	Mýa	4	2 July	8	
11 June	"Let's Get Married"/"Promise"	Jagged Edge	2	2 July	11	
18 June	"Strawberry Kisses" ◁	Nikki Webster	2	18 June	9	
25 June	"What Took You So Long?"	Emma Bunton	10	25 June	1	
2 July	"Elevation" ◁	U2	6	2 July	1	
2 July	"Uptown Girl"	Westlife	6	16 July	5	
2 July	"Come What May" ◁	Nicole Kidman and Ewan McGregor	10	2 July	1	
9 July	"Follow Me"	Uncle Kracker	1	30 July	5	
9 July	"Hanging by a Moment" (#5)	Lifehouse	1	6 August	14	
16 July	"Pop" ◁	NSYNC	10	16 July	1	
23 July	"Loverboy" ◁	Mariah Carey	7	23 July	1	
30 July	"Bootylicious" ◁	Destiny's Child	4	30 July	6	
6 August	"Purple Hills"	D12	3	13 August	4	
6 August	"Don't Stop Movin'"	S Club 7	2	13 August	10	
6 August	"U Remind Me" ◁	Usher	4	27 August	7	
6 August	"Turn Off the Light"	Nelly Furtado	7	3 September	6	
13 August	"ASAP"	Bardot	5	13 August	1	
13 August	"All Rise"	Blue	3	27 August	9	
20 August	"Let's Dance" ◁	Five	3	20 August	3	
20 August	"Drops of Jupiter (Tell Me)"	Train	5	27 August	6	
27 August	"Can We Fix It?" (#9)	Bob the Builder	1	10 September	11	
3 September	"Out of Reach"	Gabrielle	9	3 September	6	
10 September	"Ride wit Me" ◁	Nelly featuring City Spud	4	10 September	7	
10 September	"Let Me Blow Ya Mind"	Eve featuring Gwen Stefani	4	1 October	9	
17 September	"Can't Get You Out of My Head" (#3) ◁	Kylie Minogue	1	17 September	8	
24 September	"Hit 'Em Up Style (Oops!)" ◁	Blu Cantrell	3	24 September	5	
1 October	"Because I Got High" ◁	Afroman	1	15 October	9	
8 October	"I'm a Believer"	Smash Mouth	9	26 November	5	
15 October	"You Rock My World" ◁	Michael Jackson	4	15 October	1	
15 October	"How You Remind Me"	Nickelback	2	26 November	14	
15 October	"Luv Me, Luv Me"	Shaggy	10	15 October	2	
22 October	"Smooth Criminal" (#8) ◁	Alien Ant Farm	1	5 November	12	
22 October	"I'm a Slave 4 U" ◁	Britney Spears	7	22 October	1	
29 October	"Mambo No. 5" ◁	Bob the Builder	2	12 November	9	
29 October	"I Need Somebody" ◁	Bardot	5	26 November	5	
5 November	"What Would You Do?"	City High	2	3 December	9	
5 November	"Fallin'"	Alicia Keys	7	12 November	6	
5 November	"That Day" ◁	Natalie Imbruglia	10	5 November	1	
12 November	"Miss California"	Dante Thomas featuring Pras	5	10 December	8	
26 November	"Too Close"	Blue	5	3 December	4	
10 December	"Walk On" ◁	U2	9	10 December	1	
17 December	"Get the Party Started" ◁	Pink	1	31 December	10	

=== 2000 peaks ===
List of ARIA top ten singles in 2001 that peaked in 2000
Top ten entry date	Single	Artist(s)	Peak	Peak date	Weeks in top ten	References
16 October	"Teenage Dirtbag"	Wheatus	1	13 November	18	
6 November	"Graduation (Friends Forever)"	Vitamin C	2	27 November	9	
20 November	"He Don't Love You"	Human Nature	4	27 November	8	
27 November	"Don't Tell Me" ◁	Madonna	7	18 December	6	
4 December	"Independent Women Part I"	Destiny's Child	3	25 December	9	

=== 2002 peaks ===
List of ARIA top ten singles in 2001 that peaked in 2002
Top ten entry date	Single	Artist(s)	Peak	Peak date	Weeks in top ten	References
29 October	"I'm Real" ◁	Jennifer Lopez featuring Ja Rule	3	7 January	10	
3 December	"Hero"	Enrique Iglesias	1	14 January	13	
17 December	"Rapture"	iiO	3	14 January	6	
24 December	"Better Man"	Robbie Williams	6	14 January	9	
31 December	"U Got It Bad"	Usher	3	28 January	10	
31 December	"Family Affair"	Mary J. Blige	8	7 January	3	
