= ARIA Streaming Tracks Chart =

Australian music streaming chart

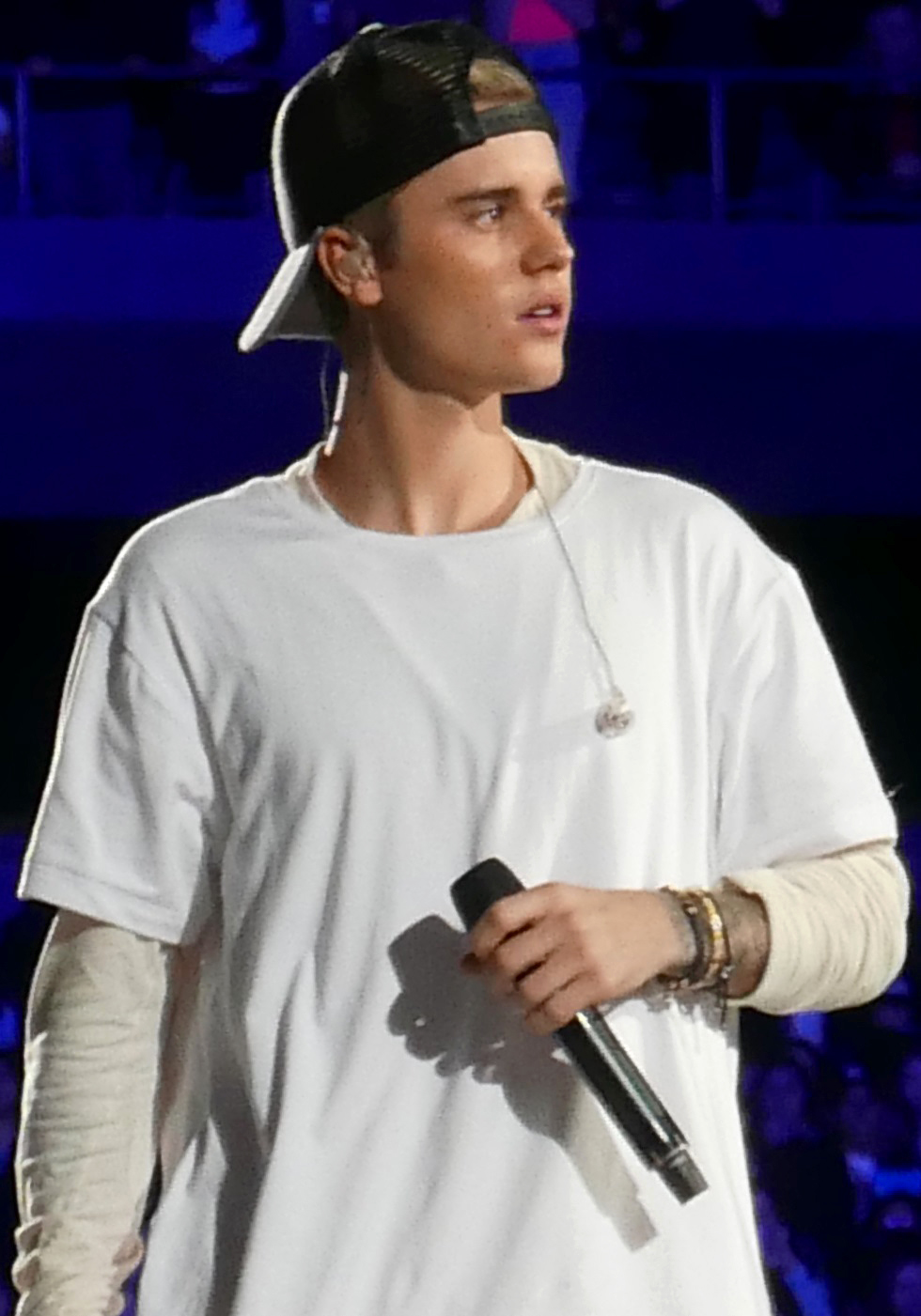
Justin Bieber holds the record for the most weeks at number one on the chart

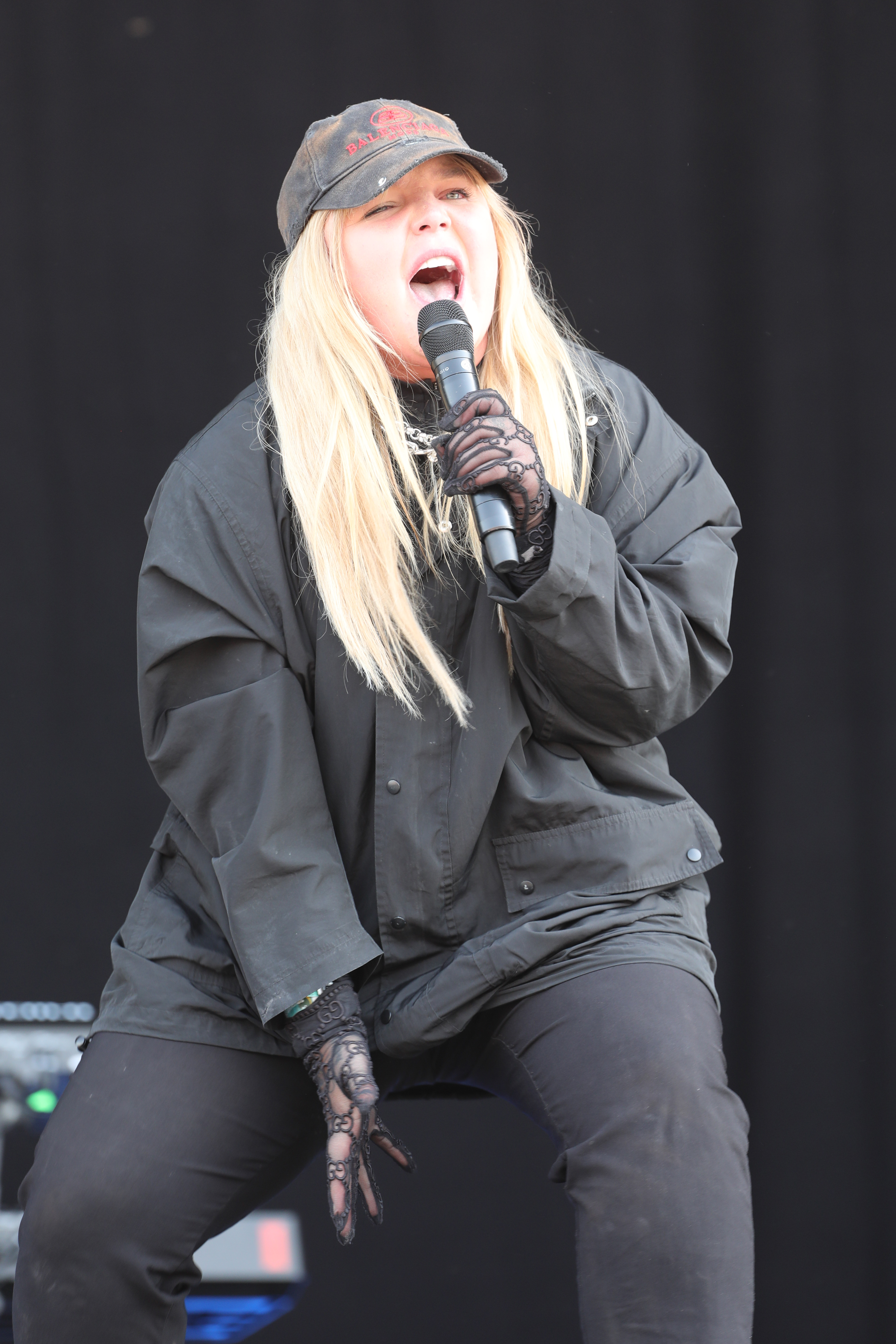
Tones and I holds the record for the most weeks at number one with one track on the chart

The ARIA Streaming Track chart ranks the highest streamed music tracks within Australia and is provided by the Australian Recording Industry Association.

== History ==
The Streaming Track Chart was established in 2012 and first published on 10 December. The chart still runs weekly as of 21 November 2025 but Subscription is required for this chart.

== Trivia ==
=== Songs with the most weeks at number one ===
23 Weeks

- Tones and I – "Dance Monkey" (2019–2020)

14 Weeks

- Ed Sheeran – "Shape of You" (2017)

13 Weeks

- Drake – "One Dance" (2016)

12 Weeks

- Luis Fonsi and Daddy Yankee featuring Justin Bieber – "Despacito" (2017)

11 Weeks

- Drake – "God's Plan" (2018)

10 Weeks

- Avicii – "Wake Me Up" (2013)
- The Chainsmokers – "Closer" (2016)
- Pharrell Williams – "Happy" (2014)

=== Cumulative weeks at number one ===
- Justin Bieber (37)
- Drake (32)
- Ed Sheeran (26)
- Pharrell Williams (23)
- Tones and I (23)
- Post Malone (18)
- Macklemore (16)

=== Artists with the most number ones ===
This list includes main artists and featured artists.

- Justin Bieber (7)
- Post Malone (6)
- Drake (4)
- Macklemore (4)
- Ed Sheeran (3)

== See also ==
- ARIA Digital Track Chart
