= List of top 25 singles for 2000 in Australia =

Top 25 singles of 2000 < 1999 2001 >

Other Australian top charts for 2000
- top 25 albums
- Triple J Hottest 100

Australian number-one charts of 2000
- albums
- singles

The following lists the top 100 singles of 2000 in Australia from the Australian Recording Industry Association (ARIA) End of Year singles chart.

"I'm Outta Love" by Anastacia was the biggest song of the year, peaking at No. 1 for five weeks and staying in the top 50 for 20 weeks. The longest stay at No. 1 was joint by Anastacia with "I'm Outta Love" which spent 5 weeks at the top spot, and it was joint by *NSYNC's "Bye Bye Bye".

#	Title	Artist(s)	Highest pos. reached	weeks at No. 1
1	"I'm Outta Love"	Anastacia	1	5
2	"Teenage Dirtbag"	Wheatus	1	4
3	"Freestyler"	Bomfunk MC's	1	3
4	"Music"	Madonna	1	4
5	"Say My Name"	Destiny's Child	1	4
6	"Poison"	Bardot	1	2
7	"Bye Bye Bye"	*NSYNC	1	5
8	"Who the Hell Are You"	Madison Avenue	1	2
9	"Groovejet (If This Ain't Love)"	Spiller feat. Sophie Ellis-Bextor	1	3
10	"Shackles (Praise You)"	Mary Mary	2	—N/a
11	"Candy"	Mandy Moore	2	—N/a
12	"Bloke"	Chris Franklin	1	2
13	"Graduation (Friends Forever)"	Vitamin C	2	—N/a
14	"Never Be the Same Again"	Melanie C feat. Lisa "Left Eye" Lopes	2	—N/a
15	"Most Girls"	Pink	1	1
16	"Shine"	Vanessa Amorosi	4	—N/a
17	"Jumpin', Jumpin'"	Destiny's Child	2	—N/a
18	"I Try"	Macy Gray	1	3
19	"She Bangs"	Ricky Martin	3	—N/a
20	"Don't You Worry"	Madasun	6	—N/a
21	"Rock DJ"	Robbie Williams	4	—N/a
22	"Who Let the Dogs Out?"	Baha Men	1	4
23	"Thong Song"	Sisqó	2	—N/a
24	"It's My Life"	Bon Jovi	5	—N/a
25	"Let's Get Loud"	Jennifer Lopez	9	—N/a
26	"Mascara / Leave Me Alone"	Killing Heidi	1	3
27	"On a Night Like This"	Kylie Minogue	1	2
28	"Spinning Around"	Kylie Minogue	1	1
29	"Lucky"	Britney Spears	3	—N/a
30	"Shape of My Heart"	Backstreet Boys	5	—N/a
31	"Come On Over Baby (All I Want Is You)"	Christina Aguilera	9	—N/a
32	"Gotta Tell You"	Samantha Mumba	3	—N/a
33	"Move Your Body"	Eiffel 65	4	—N/a
34	"We Will Rock You"	Five + Queen	3	—N/a
35	"Oops!... I Did It Again"	Britney Spears	1	2
36	"Shalala Lala"	Vengaboys	4	—N/a
37	"Holiday"	Naughty by Nature	8	—N/a
38	"S Club Party"	S Club 7	2	—N/a
39	"I Wanna Love You Forever"	Jessica Simpson	9	—N/a
40	"Absolutely Everybody"	Vanessa Amorosi	6	—N/a
41	"There You Go"	Pink	2	—N/a
42	"Day & Night"	Billie Piper	8	—N/a
43	"Pure Shores"	All Saints	4	—N/a
44	"Steal My Sunshine"	Len	3	—N/a
45	"Toca's Miracle"	Fragma	8	—N/a
46	"Breathless"	The Corrs	7	—N/a
47	"B-Boys & Flygirls"	Bomfunk MC's	7	—N/a
48	"I Turn to You"	Melanie C	11	—N/a
49	"Amazed"	Lonestar	19	—N/a
50	"Life Is a Rollercoaster"	Ronan Keating	6	—N/a
51	"Try Again"	Aaliyah	8	—N/a
52	"All the Small Things"	Blink-182	8	—N/a
53	"He Don't Love You"	Human Nature	4	—N/a
54	"Beautiful Day"	U2	1	1
55	"It's Gonna Be Me"	NSYNC	11	—N/a
56	"Bring It All Back"	S Club 7	3	—N/a
57	"The Real Slim Shady"	Eminem	11	—N/a
58	"Independent Women"	Destiny's Child	3	—N/a
59	"Blue (Da Ba Dee)"	Eiffel 65	1	9
60	"Lady (Hear Me Tonight)"	Modjo	10	—N/a
61	"Holler / Let Love Lead the Way"	Spice Girls	2	—N/a
62	"What's a Girl to Do?"	Sister2Sister	5	—N/a
63	"Could I Have This Kiss Forever"	Whitney Houston & Enrique Iglesias	12	—N/a
64	"I Think I'm in Love with You"	Jessica Simpson	10	—N/a
65	"Live Without It"	Killing Heidi	5	—N/a
66	"American Pie"	Madonna	1	1
67	"Take a Look Around"	Limp Bizkit	28	—N/a
68	"Fill Me In"	Craig David	6	—N/a
69	"Adelante"	Sash!	4	—N/a
70	"I Wanna Be with You"	Mandy Moore	13	—N/a
71	"The Brick Track vs. Gitty Up"	Salt-N-Pepa	16	—N/a
72	"He Wasn't Man Enough"	Toni Braxton	5	—N/a
73	"My Happiness"	Powderfinger	4	—N/a
74	"What a Girl Wants"	Christina Aguilera	5	—N/a
75	"Don't Give Up"	Chicane feat. Bryan Adams	6	—N/a
76	"Say It Isn't So"	Bon Jovi	9	—N/a
77	"Rip It Up"	28 Days	12	—N/a
78	"Pray"	Tina Cousins	8	—N/a
79	"We Think It's Love"	Leah Haywood	7	—N/a
80	"Ex-Girlfriend"	No Doubt	9	—N/a
81	"Why Does It Always Rain on Me?"	Travis	11	—N/a
82	"Everything You Need"	Madison Avenue	6	—N/a
83	"Don't Call Me Baby"	Madison Avenue	2	—N/a
84	"It Feels So Good"	Sonique	21	—N/a
85	"Stronger"	Britney Spears	13	—N/a
86	"Mambo Italiano"	Shaft	17	—N/a
87	"The Bad Touch"	Bloodhound Gang	5	—N/a
88	"Better Off Alone"	Alice Deejay	4	—N/a
89	"Bent"	Matchbox Twenty	19	—N/a
90	"Last One Standing"	Girl Thing	17	—N/a
91	"Do You Want My Love"	Coco Lee	14	—N/a
92	"Don't Say You Love Me"	M2M	4	—N/a
93	"Original Prankster"	The Offspring	5	—N/a
94	"Show Me the Meaning of Being Lonely"	Backstreet Boys	19	—N/a
95	"Affirmation"	Savage Garden	16	—N/a
96	"I Should've Never Let You Go"	Bardot	14	—N/a
97	"I See You Baby"	Groove Armada	11	—N/a
98	"Don't Wanna Let You Go"	Five	17	—N/a
99	"Cartoon Heroes"	Aqua	16	—N/a
100	"These Days"	Bardot	19	—N/a
