= Tiffani Wood =

- Born: Tiffany Jane Wood; 8 November 1977 (age 48); Newcastle, New South Wales, Australia
- Genres: Indie, pop rock
- Occupations: Singer, songwriter
- Years active: 2000–present
- Labels: Warner Music Australia, Mudhoney
- Member of: Bardot

Tiffany "Tiffani" Jane Wood (born 8 November 1977) is an Australian singer and songwriter, and a member of pop girl group Bardot.

== Career ==
In 1999, Wood auditioned for the first Australian season of Popstars, a reality television show which aimed to create a new girl group. After selections for the group were finalised by the judges, Wood just missed out. However, after original member Chantelle Barry departed the group shortly after its inception, Wood was selected to replace her as the group's fifth member. The group became known as Bardot.

Popstars aired in early 2000 and became a ratings success. Bardot became the first Australian act to debut at number one with both its debut single, "Poison", and self-titled debut album. Further singles "I Should've Never Let You Go", "These Days", "ASAP", "I Need Somebody" and "Love Will Find A Way" all reached the top 20 on the Australian singles chart. Bardot also promoted their music internationally, with promotional tours across Singapore, Taiwan, New Zealand, India and the United Kingdom. Following the release of their second album, Play It Like That, Bardot disbanded in May 2002.

Wood briefly signed as a solo artist to Warner Music Australia and released her debut single, "What R U Waiting 4" in March 2004. The track peaked at number 27 on the Australian singles chart. In 2005, she established her own independent record label Mudhoney Records, and released three singles – "Devil in Your Soul", "Spin the Bottle" and the Divinyls song "I Touch Myself – which featured on her debut solo album Bite Your Tongue, released in October 2006.

In 2008, following the birth of her first child, Wood released an album of lullaby music called Acoustic Dreams – Lullabies for Babies.

In 2007, Wood appeared in the stage musical Las Vegas Confidential – The Musical and in 2009, she reunited with former Bardot bandmate Katie Underwood in the stage show Valentino.

Since 2017, Wood has operated her own performing arts school in Queensland called Popstar Kidz.

In April 2020, to commemorate Bardot's 20 year anniversary, Wood reunited online with former bandmates Belinda Chapple and Katie Underwood to perform an acapella version of "Poison".

In 2024, she competed on the Nine Network reality series The Summit.

== Personal life ==
Wood was married to bodyguard Neil Cummins from 2007 to 2009. She has six children.

== Discography ==
=== Albums ===
List of albums, with selected details
Title	Details
Bite Your Tongue	Released: 14 October 2006; Format: CD, digital; Label: Mudhoney Records
Acoustic Dreams – Lullabies for Babies	Released: 2008; Format: CD, digital; Label: Destra

=== Singles ===
List of singles, with selected chart positions
Title	Year	Chart positions	Album
Title	Year	AUS	Album
"What R U Waiting 4"	2004	27	non album single
"Devil in Your Soul"	2005	—	Bite Your Tongue
"Spin the Bottle"	2006	—	Bite Your Tongue
"I Touch Myself"	2006	—	Bite Your Tongue
