= List of top 25 albums for 2000 in Australia =

Top 25 albums of 2000 < 1999 2001 >

Other Australian top charts for 2000
- top 25 singles
- Triple J Hottest 100

Australian number-one charts of 2000
- albums
- singles

The following lists the top 100 albums of 2000 in Australia from the Australian Recording Industry Association (ARIA) End of Year Albums Chart.

#	Title	Artist	Highest pos. reached	Weeks at No. 1
1.	One	The Beatles	1	9
2.	Odyssey Number Five	Powderfinger	1	3 (Note: Odyssey Number Five debuted at #1 in September, 2000 and remained in the charts until March, 2002)
3.	Affirmation	Savage Garden	1	6 (Note: Affirmation debuted at #1 in November, 1999 and also reached #1 in May, 2000 and July, 2000. It remained in the charts until April, 2001)
4.	The Power	Vanessa Amorosi	1	1
5.	Reflector	Killing Heidi	1	7
6.	Californication	Red Hot Chili Peppers	1	1
7.	On How Life Is	Macy Gray	1	8
8.	All That You Can't Leave Behind	U2	1	2
9.	Not That Kind	Anastacia	2	
10.	Play	Moby	1	3 (Note: Play in June, 1999 reaching #1 in March, 2000 and again in August, 2000. It remained in the charts until April, 2001.)
11.	In Blue	The Corrs	1	1
12.	33⅓	John Farnham	1	4
13.	The Writing's on the Wall	Destiny's Child	2	
14.	Oops!... I Did It Again	Britney Spears	2	
15.	Mad Season	Matchbox 20	1	5
16.	The Games Of The XXVII Olympiad 2000: Music from the Opening Ceremony	Various Artists		
17.	Light Years	Kylie Minogue	1	1
18.	Enema of the State	Blink-182	4	
19.	Supernatural	Santana	1	1
20.	Bardot	Bardot	1	1
21.	Significant Other	Limp Bizkit	5	
22.	Conspiracy of One	The Offspring	4	
23.	Music	Madonna	2	
24.	Chocolate Starfish and the Hot Dog Flavored Water	Limp Bizkit	1	1
25.	Black & Blue	Backstreet Boys	2	
26.	Sound Loaded	Ricky Martin	3	
27.	Crush	Bon Jovi	1	1
28.	Looking Forward Looking Back	Slim Dusty	3	
29.	The Polyester Embassy	Madison Avenue	4	
30.	The Marshall Mathers LP	Eminem	1	1
31.	Ronan	Ronan Keating	5	
32.	Can't Take Me Home	Pink	10	
33.	Mission: Impossible 2	Soundtrack	3	
34.	The Distance to Here	Live	1	1
35.	The Ultimate Collection	Barry White	5	
36.	Binaural	Pearl Jam	1	1
37.	The Greatest Hits	Cher	5	
38.	All the Way... A Decade of Song	Celine Dion	1	2
39.	It's a Party	Hi-5	4	
40.	The Man Who	Travis	8	
41.	The Captain	Kasey Chambers	11	
42.	The Platinum Album	Vengaboys	20	
43.	Soul Deeper... Songs from the Deep South	Jimmy Barnes	3	
44.	Christina Aguilera	Christina Aguilera	21	
45.	No Strings Attached	NSYNC	3	
46.	Come On Over	Shania Twain	1	20
47.	Upstyledown	28 Days	1	1
48.	Internationalist	Powderfinger	1	1
49.	The Mark, Tom, and Travis Show (The Enema Strikes Back!)	Blink-182	6	
50.	Greatest Hits	Lenny Kravitz	14	
51.	Enrique	Enrique Iglesias	11	
52.	The Best Of: Volume 1	Silverchair	16	
53.	Renegades	Rage Against the Machine	10	
54.	Human Nature	Human Nature	7	
55.	Charlie's Angels	Soundtrack	5	
56.	Born to Do It	Craig David	2	
57.	Romanza	Andrea Bocelli	2	
58.	Surrender	The Chemical Brothers	5	
59.	Buena Vista Social Club	Buena Vista Social Club	6	
60.	Do Not Talk Over Me	Guido Hatzis	11	
61.	Roll On	The Living End	15	
62.	The Best of Van Morrison	Van Morrison	1	3
63.	Whitney: The Greatest Hits	Whitney Houston	3	
64.	Pokémon: The First Movie	Soundtrack	9	
65.	Invincible	Five	5	
66.	A Day Without Rain	Enya	4	
67.	Riding with the King	B.B. King and Eric Clapton	5	
68.	Remember Cat Stevens	Cat Stevens	10	
69.	The Best of 1980–1990	U2	1	5
70.	Kid A	Radiohead	2	
71.	Halfway Between the Gutter and the Stars	Fatboy Slim	6	
72.	Ricky Martin	Ricky Martin	1	1
73.	Whatever...	Guido Hatzis	8	
74.	Forever	Spice Girls	9	
75.	More Music Live from the Panel	The Panel	10	
76.	Stiff Upper Lip	AC/DC	3	
77.	Unplugged	The Corrs	14	
78.	The Ultimate Collection	Creedence Clearwater Revival	10	
79.	Elton John One Night Only – The Greatest Hits	Elton John	32	
80.	Warning	Green Day	7	
81.	Heart and Soul: New Songs from Ally McBeal	Vonda Shepard	17	
82.	Black the Sun	Alex Lloyd	9	
83.	You've Come a Long Way, Baby	Fatboy Slim	2	
84.	It's a Wiggly Wiggly World	The Wiggles	39	
85.	Love This City	The Whitlams	3	
86.	S Club	S Club 7	17	
87.	Imaginate	Taxiride	1	1
88.	Jump and Jive with Hi-5	Hi-5	33	
89.	Legend	Bob Marley and the Wailers	14	
90.	In Stereo	Bomfunk MC's	24	
91.	There Is Nothing Left to Lose	Foo Fighters	5	
92.	Mer de Noms	A Perfect Circle	2	
93.	One	Sister2Sister	3	
94.	...Baby One More Time	Britney Spears	2	
95.	The Best of Me	Bryan Adams	18	
96.	Liquid Skin	Gomez	9	
97.	Europop	Eiffel 65	18	
98.	On the 6	Jennifer Lopez	11	
99.	Waiting for the Day	Bachelor Girl	20	
100.	Sailing to Philadelphia	Mark Knopfler	16	

Peak chart positions from 2000 are from the ARIA Charts, overall position on the End of Year Chart is calculated by ARIA based on the number of weeks and position that the records reach within the Top 50 albums for each week during 2000.
