= Sophie Monk =

Australian TV presenter (born 1979)

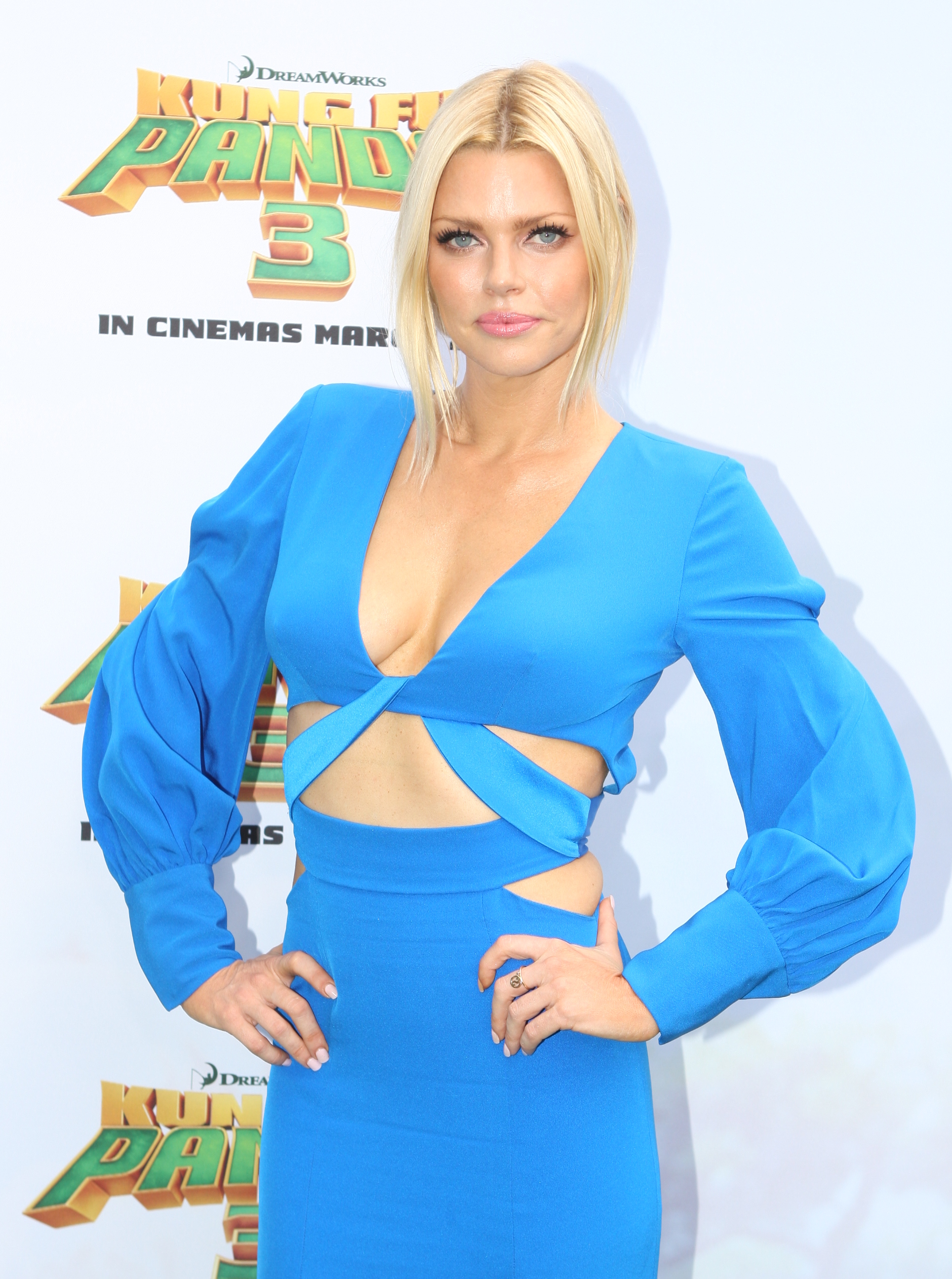
- Monk at the Australian premiere of Kung Fu Panda 3, March 2016
- Born: Sophie Charlene Akland Monk; 14 December 1979 (age 46); London, England
- Occupations: Singer; actress; television personality; model
- Years active: 1997–present
- Spouse: Joshua Gross (m. 2022)
- Musical career
- Genres: Pop; dance
- Instrument: Vocals
- Label: Warner Music Group; (2000–2004)
- Formerly of: Bardot
- Website: sophiemonk.com.au

Sophie Charlene Akland Monk (born 14 December 1979) is an Australian singer, actress, and television personality. She was a member of the pop girl group Bardot, winners of the first season of Popstars Australia in 2000. After the group disbanded in 2002, Monk released her debut solo studio album, Calendar Girl (2003). She also ventured into acting with roles in the films Date Movie (2006), Click (2006), Sex and Death 101 (2007), The Hills Run Red (2009), and Spring Breakdown (2009).

On reality television, Monk was the winner of the fourth season of The Celebrity Apprentice Australia in 2015, and in 2016, she was a judge on Australia's Got Talent. In 2017, she starred on the third season of The Bachelorette Australia, and the following year, she became the host of Love Island Australia. In 2021, Monk hosted Beauty and the Geek Australia.

== Early life ==
Sophie Monk was born in London, England to an English father and an Australian mother. In 1982 her parents moved to Australia's Gold Coast in Queensland when she was two years old. She attended Helensvale Primary School, St Hilda's, Somerset College, A.B. Paterson College and MacGregor State High School, where she graduated as school captain in 1997. She was trained in classical opera growing up. Following graduation, Monk worked as a Marilyn Monroe impersonator at Warner Bros. Movie World on the Gold Coast.

== Music career ==
=== Bardot ===
Monk's professional music career began in 1999 when she responded to an advertisement for the first Australian season of Popstars, a reality television series which aimed to create a successful new girl group. In one audition, she performed a rendition of Marilyn Monroe's famous "Happy Birthday, Mr. President", working on her previous experience as a Monroe impersonator. After several elimination rounds, Monk was selected as a member of the group, which was named Bardot.

The program aired in early 2000 and became a massive ratings success. Bardot became the first Australian act to debut at number one with both its debut single, "Poison", and self-titled debut album. Further singles "I Should've Never Let You Go", "These Days", "ASAP", "I Need Somebody" and "Love Will Find A Way" all reached the Australian top 20. Several months following the release of their second album, Play It Like That, Bardot disbanded in May 2002.

=== Solo career ===
Shortly following Bardot's disbandment, Monk signed a solo recording contract with Warner Music Australia. Her debut single "Inside Outside" was released in October 2002 and was produced by Grammy Award winning music producer Rob Davis. The track peaked at number five on the ARIA Singles Chart and was certified gold for shipments of 35,000 copies. In May 2003 Monk released her debut album Calendar Girl which peaked at number 35 on the ARIA Albums Chart. It produced two further singles, "Get the Music On" and "One Breath Away", which peaked at number 10 and number 23 respectively. In 2004, Monk parted ways with Warner Music Group to focus on a Hollywood acting career.

In April 2017, Monk performed with country singer Kasey Chambers at Byron Bay Bluesfest. In September 2021, she briefly resumed her music career with the jazz-inspired single "Nice to Meet You".

== Acting career ==
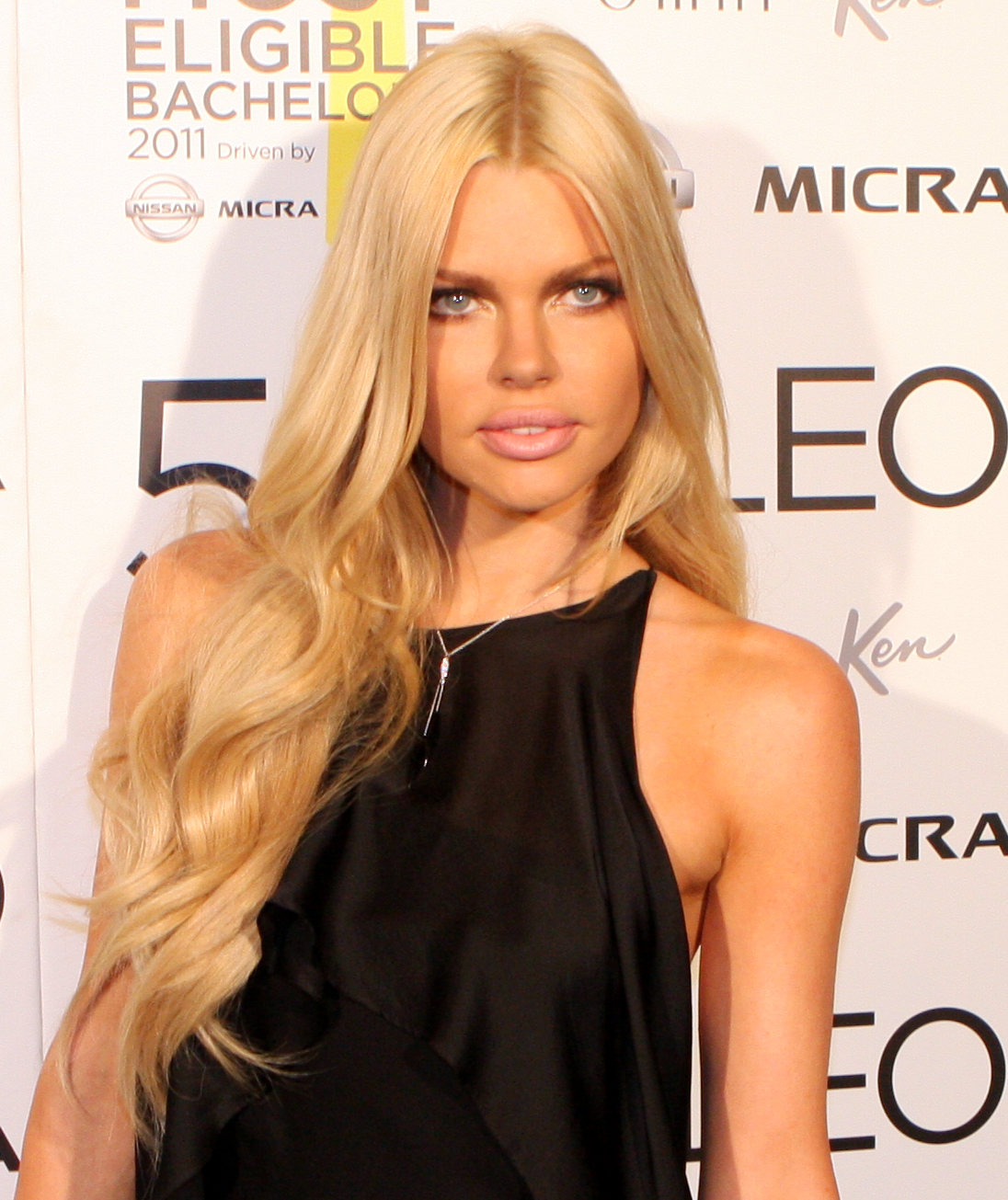
Monk in 2011

In 2004, Monk made her acting debut in a bit role on the Nine Network made-for-television film The Mystery of Natalie Wood portraying the role of Marilyn Monroe. That same year, Monk appeared in the music video Always by Pop Punk band Blink-182. Monk has had small roles in films such as Click, Murder World and Spring Break '83.

In 2005, Monk relocated to Los Angeles, California to pursue a career in acting. Monk quickly landed her break-out role in the spoof comedy film Date Movie. In July 2007, Monk made her American television debut in the HBO Comedy series Entourage. That same year she appeared in the dark comedy Sex and Death 101.

Monk starred in the Warner Premiere comedy film Spring Breakdown alongside Parker Posey and Amy Poehler. Filming took place in South Padre in 2006. Monk portrayed the role of the film's antagonist a bimbo sorority girl named Mason. The film underwent a long post-production period suffering distribution problems. The film premiered at the Sundance Film Festival to negative reviews. The film was released straight-to-DVD in June 2009.

In September 2008, Dark Castle Entertainment announced Monk was cast in the slasher horror film The Hills Run Red. Filming began at the start of 2009 in Sofia, Bulgaria and premiered at UK Frightfest. The film was released straight-to-DVD in September 2009 to mixed reviews from critics with some praising Monk's performance. In September 2008, Monk announced she was developing her own reality television series titled Bigger Than Paris. Monk filmed the pilot in January 2010 in Los Angeles, California.

In April 2013, Monk was working on a sitcom with actor Sam Worthington. Monk talked about her struggles as an actress and revealed that she has produced five television pilots for major networks, but they haven't been picked up. "Shows that were meant to get the green light, didn't, and movies that were meant to be massive, weren't, but I just keep going and going," she said. In 2015, Monk was added to the cast for the remake movie of Blood Feast.

== Other ventures ==
=== Television ===
In April 2010, Nine Network announced Monk would be a special guest presenter on the travel television program Getaway. Following her first appearance, Nine announced Monk would continue appearing on the series in a recurring form from then on. As part of her role, she has visited Hawaii, Las Vegas, Mexico.

In May 2012, Monk was announced to be one of the celebrities to have signed up for the FOX dating-show The Choice. The series is a spin-off to The Voice and sees celebrity judges sitting with their backs turned to a pool of "sexy singles" hoping to score a date with a celebrity. The series premiered on 7 June 2012.

On 28 October 2015, it was confirmed that Monk would be a new judge on Australia's Got Talent replacing Geri Halliwell for its eighth season alongside Kelly Osbourne, Eddie Perfect and Ian "Dicko" Dickson.

In 2015, Monk was declared the winner of the fourth season of The Celebrity Apprentice Australia.

In April 2017, it was announced that Monk would star on The Bachelorette Australia. In December, she was announced as the host of a brand new reality series on the Nine Network called Love Island Australia, which aired on 27 May 2018 on 9Go!.

In 2020, Monk was revealed to be a participant on the second season of The Masked Singer Australia, performing as the "Dragonfly". She was the fifth contestant eliminated, placing 8th overall.

On 16 September 2020, Monk was announced as the new host for the revival of Beauty and the Geek Australia on Nine Network in 2021.

In December 2021, Monk was announced as one of the four celebrity contestants for the Lego Masters Bricksmas Special alongside journalist Brooke Boney, radio and TV presenter Wippa and television presenter Scott Cam. She was partnered up with season one winner Henry. In 2023, she made a guest appearance on the fifth season of Lego Masters, and made additional guest appearances during its sixth and seventh seasons.

=== Radio ===
In 2013, Monk filled in for Fifi Box on Fifi and Jules whilst Box was on maternity leave.

In December 2013, Monk along with Jules Lund, Merrick Watts and Mel B were announced as the new hosts of the 2Day FM breakfast show replacing Kyle and Jackie O Show.

In October 2014, Southern Cross Austereo announced that Jules, Merrick & Sophie on 2Day FM would be axed due to poor ratings throughout the year and replaced by The Dan & Maz Show.

Since then, Monk has been a regular fixture on KIIS 1065's Kyle and Jackie O Show and has hosted The Summer Fling breakfast show with Matty Acton on KIIS 1065 and KIIS 101.1.

In January 2026, ARN announced that Monk will fill in for Will McMahon on the KIIS Network's Will & Woody for a few weeks whilst he is on paternity leave.

=== Endorsements ===
Monk has appeared in several commercials for Diet Vanilla Coke, Pepsi Max, LG Electronics, Coca-Cola and Expozay Swimwear. In 2012, she appeared in a billboard campaign for Angel Champagne on the famous La Cienega Boulevard in Hollywood.

In 2019, Monk became the brand ambassador for Australian health snack brand Slim Secrets and cosmetic brand MCO Beauty.

== Public image ==
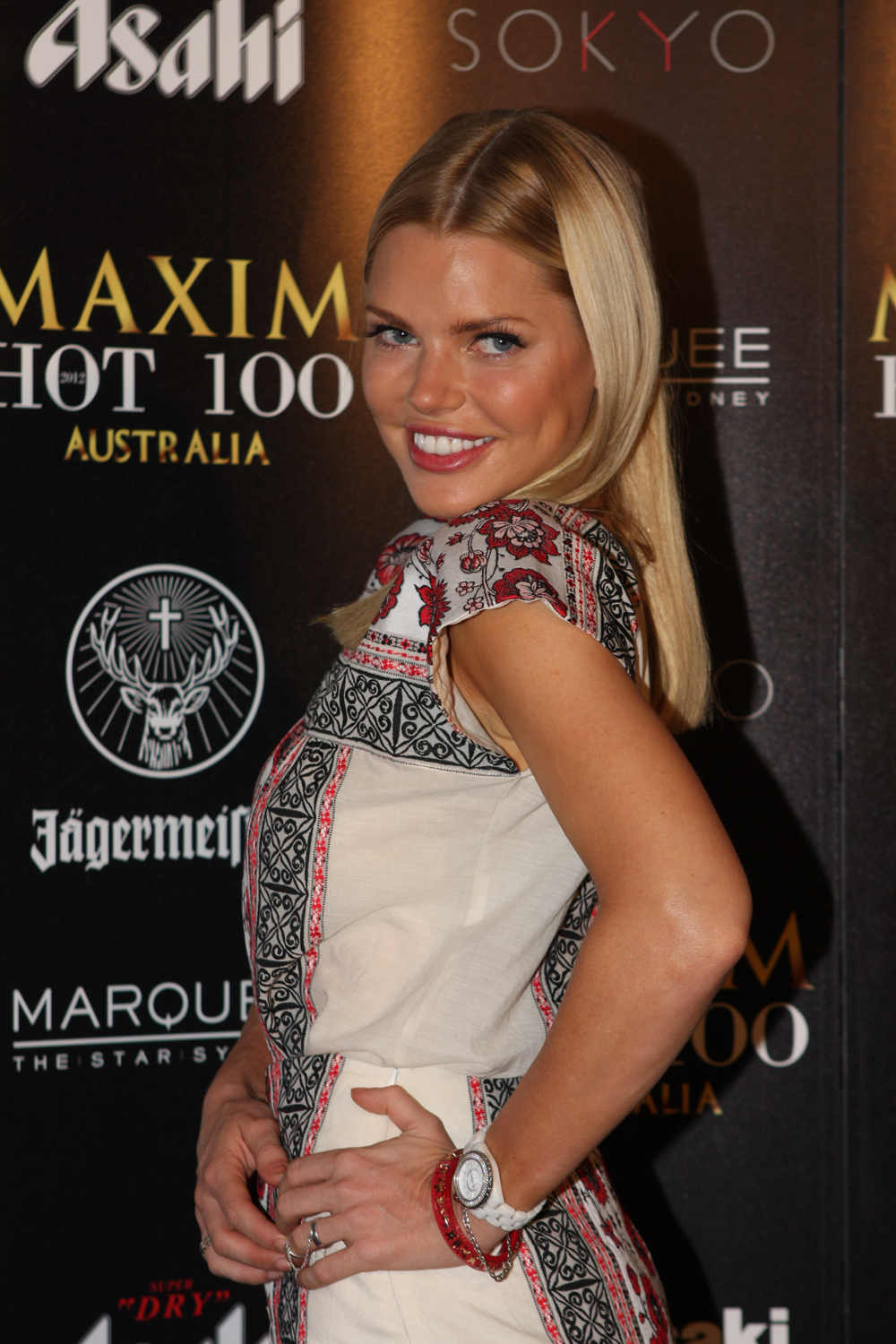
Sophie Monk at the Hot 100 Halloween Bash at Sydney's Marquee nightclub in 2012

Monk is often spotlighted for her looks. In October 2012, Monk was ranked number 7 on Maxim Australia's Hot 100. She ranked at No. 96 in the Maxim Hot 100 List of 2011. She was No. 2 in FHM's Sexiest Women List in 2003.

Monk is also well known for her modelling career and has appeared on the cover of several men's magazines, including Maxim, FHM, Stuff and Ralph. In August 2008 and again in 2011, she was offered $1 million to pose for Playboy magazine, which she declined. Monk commented about the offer, "When I was younger I was like, 'I want to be on Playboy.' My mum was a Playmate, she was hot." In 2014 she accepted an offer to be photographed for Playboy. The photos were posted exclusively for viewing on the magazine's website, Playboy Plus. Commenting about her pictorial Monk said, "Marilyn Monroe did Playboy. It's an iconic brand, and let's get real... You only live once and I don't plan on dieting forever... I miss pizza too much!"

Year	Countdown name	Rank #
2000	FHM's 100 Sexiest Women	69 AUS
2001	FHM's 100 Sexiest Women	3 AUS
2002	FHM's 100 Sexiest Women	11 AUS
2003	FHM's 100 Sexiest Women	2 AUS
2004	FHM's 100 Sexiest Women	9 AUS
2005	FHM's 100 Sexiest Women	28 AUS
2006	FHM's 100 Sexiest Women	22 AUS
2008	Who's Most Beautiful Person of 2008	1
2008	FHM's 100 Sexiest Women	72 AUS
2008	Candidates for PETA's Sexiest Vegetarian Celebrity	75
2009	FHM's 100 Sexiest Women	33 AUS
2009	AskMen's 99 Most Desirable Women	11
2010	E! Online's Beautiful Women	3
2010	AskMen's 99 Most Desirable Women	71
2011	Maxim's Hot 100	96 US
2012	Maxim's Hot 100	7 AUS

== Personal life ==
=== Relationships ===
Monk was engaged to American guitarist Benji Madden, but the couple split up in February 2008.

In January 2011, Monk announced her engagement to Jimmy Esebag. A few months later Monk announced on Chelsea Lately that she had separated from Esebag.

In October 2017, after completion of The Bachelorette Australia, Monk began a steady relationship with the winner, Stu Laundy. In January 2018, she broke off the relationship by announcing it on Instagram.

In 2022, Monk married Joshua Gross in a private ceremony at their New South Wales home after being in a relationship since 2018.

=== Health and legal issues ===
In February 2010, Monk was photographed in a wheelchair following a car crash in Los Angeles.

In 2013, Monk revealed she has had a stalker who wanted to kill her, saying, "He thought he could hear me screaming in the corner of his hospital room and thought I wanted to die. So I wrote to him and told him I was fine," she said.

In 2018, Monk was diagnosed with endometriosis.

== Discography ==
=== Albums ===
List of studio albums with selected chart positions
Title	Details	Peak positions
Title	Details	AUS
Calendar Girl	Released: 5 May 2003; Label: WEA (2564603082); Format: CD, streaming	35

=== Singles ===
List of singles, with selected chart positions and certifications, showing year released and originating album
Title	Year	Peak positions	Certifications	Album
Title	Year	AUS	Certifications	Album
"Inside Outside"	2002	5	ARIA: Gold	Calendar Girl
"Get the Music On"	2003	10		Calendar Girl
"One Breath Away"	2003	23		Calendar Girl
"Nice to Meet You"	2021	—		Non-album single
"—" denotes a recording that did not chart or was not released in that territory.

=== Other appearances ===
Song	Year	Album
"Little Drummer Boy" (live at the Carols in the Domain)	2007	Carols in the Domain: 25th Anniversary

=== Music videos ===
List of music videos, showing year released and directors
Title	Year	Director
"Inside Outside"	2002	Mark Hartley
"Get the Music On"	2003	
"One Breath Away"	2003	Mark Hartley
"Nice to Meet You"	2021	Emilio Abbonizio

== Filmography ==
=== Film ===
Year	Film	Role	Notes
2005	London	Lauren	
2006	Date Movie	Andy	
2006	Click	Stacey	
2007	Sex and Death 101	Cynthia Rose	
2009	Spring Breakdown	Mason Masters	
2009	The Hills Run Red	Alexa	
2009	Life Blood	Brooke Anchel	
2010	Hard Breakers	Lindsay Greene	
2011	National Lampoon's 301: The Legend of Awesomest Maximus	Princess Ellen	
2013	Dorfman in Love	Vronka	
2013	Spring Break '83	Brittney	
2016	Bloodfeast	Penny Ramses	Remake movie
TBD	Zombie Plane	Sophie	

=== Television ===
Year	Title	Role	Notes
1999	Monster!	Girlfriend #1	Television film
2000	Popstars Australia	Contestant	Winner of season one with Bardot
2002	Who Wants to Be a Millionaire?	Contestant	Celebrity edition
2004	The Mystery of Natalie Wood	Marilyn Monroe	Documentary
2004	Open Sesame	Herself	"Play Along With Ollie" segments
2005	Pool Guys	Janet	Television film
2007	Entourage	Juliette	Episode: "The Day Fuckers"
2008	Fear Itself	Virginia	1 episode
2008	The Merrick & Rosso Show	Herself	Guest; 1 episode
2010	Getaway	Host	
2010	The Spin Crowd	Herself	Episode: "Beauty and the Billionaire"
2011, 2017	The Project	Guest Panellist	3 episodes
2011, 2019	Talkin' 'Bout Your Generation	Contestant	2 episodes
2012	The Choice	Herself	Guest; 1 episode
2013	Dirty Laundry Live	Herself	Guest; 1 episode
2013	Rich at Night	Host	
2015	The Celebrity Apprentice Australia	Contestant	Winner of Season 4
2016	Australia's Got Talent	Judge	Season 8
2016	Accidental Heroes	Co-host	With Nick Cody
2017	The Bachelorette Australia	Herself	Season 3 Bachelorette
2017	The Living Room	Herself	Guest; 1 episode
2017	Have You Been Paying Attention?	Herself	Guest quiz master; 1 episode
2017	All Star Family Feud	Contestant	Team captain; 1 episode
2018	Talking Married	Herself	Television film
2018–present	Love Island Australia	Host	
2020	At Home Alone Together	Herself	2 episodes
2020	The Masked Singer Australia	Dragonfly / Contestant	Season 2, 8th place
2021–present	Lego Masters	Contestant / Guest / Judge	Christmas special and seasons five, six and seven
2021	Beauty and the Geek Australia	Host	
2021–present	The Hundred with Andy Lee	Panellist	
2022, 2024	RuPaul's Drag Race Down Under	Guest Judge	2 episodes
2025	Love Island USA Aftersun	Host	

=== Music videos ===
Year	Music video	Artist
2004	"Always"	Blink-182
