= List of number-one singles of 2000 (Australia) =

ARIA Charts number-one singles of 2000 < 1990s 2001 >

Other Australian number-one charts of 2000
- albums

Top Australian singles and albums of 2000
- Triple J Hottest 100
- top 25 singles
- top 25 albums

The ARIA Singles Chart ranks the best-performing singles in Australia. Its data, published by the Australian Recording Industry Association, is based collectively on each single's weekly physical and digital sales. There were 20 Number 1 singles in 2000, including "Blue (Da Ba Dee)" by Eiffel 65, which had already spent seven weeks at Number 1 in 1999.

Fourteen acts gained their first Number 1, either as a lead or featured artist: Macy Gray, Killing Heidi, Chris Franklin, *NSYNC, Bardot, Destiny's Child, Madison Avenue, Bomfunk MC's, Anastacia, Pink, Spiller, Sophie Ellis-Bextor, Wheatus and Baha Men. Both Madonna and Kylie Minogue earned two Number 1 singles during the year.

NSYNC's "Bye Bye Bye" and Anastacia's "I'm Outta Love" both spent the most weeks at Number 1 with five weeks each. Destiny's Child's "Say My Name", Madonna's "Music", and Baha Men's "Who Let the Dogs Out?" all spent four weeks at the top spot.

== Chart history ==
Key
The yellow background indicates the #1 song on ARIA's Year End Singles Chart of 2000.

Date	Song	Artist(s)	Ref.
2 January	"Blue (Da Ba Dee)"	Eiffel 65	
9 January	"Blue (Da Ba Dee)"	Eiffel 65	
16 January	"I Try"	Macy Gray	
23 January	"I Try"	Macy Gray	
30 January	"Mascara"/"Leave Me Alone"	Killing Heidi	
6 February	"Mascara"/"Leave Me Alone"	Killing Heidi	
13 February	"Mascara"/"Leave Me Alone"	Killing Heidi	
20 February	"I Try"	Macy Gray	
27 February	"Bloke"	Chris Franklin	
5 March	"Bloke"	Chris Franklin	
12 March	"American Pie"	Madonna	
19 March	"Bye Bye Bye"	*NSYNC	
26 March	"Bye Bye Bye"	*NSYNC	
2 April	"Bye Bye Bye"	*NSYNC	
9 April	"Bye Bye Bye"	*NSYNC	
16 April	"Bye Bye Bye"	*NSYNC	
23 April	"Poison"	Bardot	
30 April	"Poison"	Bardot	
7 May	"Say My Name"	Destiny's Child	
14 May	"Say My Name"	Destiny's Child	
21 May	"Say My Name"	Destiny's Child	
28 May	"Say My Name"	Destiny's Child	
4 June	"Oops!... I Did It Again"	Britney Spears	
11 June	"Oops!... I Did It Again"	Britney Spears	
18 June	"Who the Hell Are You"	Madison Avenue	
25 June	"Who the Hell Are You"	Madison Avenue	
2 July	"Spinning Around"	Kylie Minogue	
9 July	"Freestyler"	Bomfunk MC's	
16 July	"Freestyler"	Bomfunk MC's	
23 July	"Freestyler"	Bomfunk MC's	
30 July	"I'm Outta Love"	Anastacia	
6 August	"I'm Outta Love"	Anastacia	
13 August	"I'm Outta Love"	Anastacia	
20 August	"I'm Outta Love"	Anastacia	
27 August	"I'm Outta Love"	Anastacia	
3 September	"Music"	Madonna	
10 September	"Music"	Madonna	
17 September	"Music"	Madonna	
24 September	"On a Night Like This"	Kylie Minogue	
1 October	"Music"	Madonna	
8 October	"Most Girls"	Pink	
15 October	"On a Night Like This"	Kylie Minogue	
22 October	"Beautiful Day"	U2	
29 October	"Groovejet (If This Ain't Love)"	Spiller featuring Sophie Ellis-Bextor	
5 November	"Groovejet (If This Ain't Love)"	Spiller featuring Sophie Ellis-Bextor	
12 November	"Groovejet (If This Ain't Love)"	Spiller featuring Sophie Ellis-Bextor	
19 November	"Teenage Dirtbag"	Wheatus	
26 November	"Who Let the Dogs Out?"	Baha Men	
3 December	"Who Let the Dogs Out?"	Baha Men	
10 December	"Who Let the Dogs Out?"	Baha Men	
17 December	"Who Let the Dogs Out?"	Baha Men	
24 December	"Teenage Dirtbag"	Wheatus	
31 December	"Teenage Dirtbag"	Wheatus	

== Number-one artists ==
Position	Artist	Weeks at No. 1
1	*NSYNC	5
1	Anastacia	5
1	Madonna	5
2	Destiny's Child	4
2	Baha Men	4
2	Wheatus	3
3	Macy Gray	3
3	Killing Heidi	3
3	Spiller	3
3	Sophie Ellis-Bextor (as featuring)	3
3	Bomfunk MC's	3
3	Kylie Minogue	3
4	Chris Franklin	2
4	Bardot	2
4	Britney Spears	2
4	Madison Avenue	2
5	Eiffel 65	1
5	Pink	1
5	U2	1

Songs that peaked at number two include "Shackles (Praise You)" by Mary Mary, "Candy" by Mandy Moore, "Graduation (Friends Forever)" by Vitamin C, "Never Be the Same Again" by Melanie C feat. Lisa "Left Eye" Lopes and "Jumpin', Jumpin'" by Destiny's Child

Songs that peaked at number three include "She Bangs" by Ricky Martin, Lucky by Britney Spears, "Gotta Tell You" by Samantha Mumba, "We Will Rock You" by Five + Queen and "Steal My Sunshine" by Len.

Other hit songs included "Shine" by Vanessa Amorosi (4), Rock DJ By Robbie Williams (4), "It's My Life" by Bon Jovi (5), "Don't Tell Me" by Madonna (8), Let's Get Loud by Jennifer Lopez (9)
