= Belinda Chapple =

Australian singer

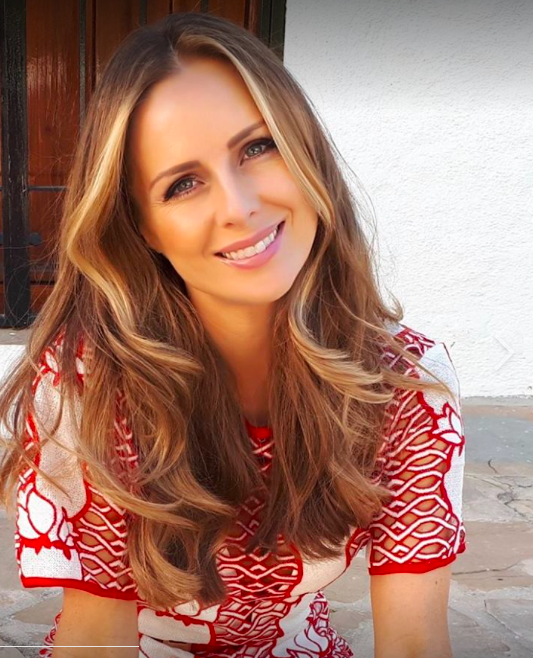
- Belinda Chapple

Background information
- Born: Belinda Barbara Chapple; 15 January 1975 (age 51)
- Genre: Dance-pop
- Occupations: Singer; model; stage director; interior designer
- Years active: 1995–present
- Member of: Bardot

Belinda Barbara Chapple (born 15 January 1975) is an Australian singer, creative director and interior designer. She is a former member of female pop group Bardot.

== Career ==
Chapple's pop music career began in 1995 during a brief stint as a member of Australian girl group GF4, following Jacqueline Cowell's departure. Chapple recorded demos with the group, but they broke up in 1996 before she had the opportunity to release music with them. In October 1999, at the age of 24, Chapple auditioned for the first Australian series of Popstars, a reality television show which sought to produce a new girl group. Chapple was selected from over 2,000 girls that auditioned across Australia, and formed part of the group Bardot.

Popstars was one of the highest-rating television programs in Australia of 2000 and with this exposure, Bardot's debut single "Poison" and self-titled debut album both entered the Australian ARIA charts at number one, achieving multi-platinum sales and three ARIA Music Award nominations. In 2001 Bardot released their second album, Play It Like That, which included the singles "ASAP" and "I Need Somebody", both which charted in the Australian top five. During their time together, Bardot performed two concert tours across Australia and made promotional visits to Singapore, Taiwan, Malaysia, New Zealand, India and the United Kingdom. In 2002, the group disbanded, leaving Chapple "shell-shocked" and "heartbroken".

After Bardot's split, Chapple released two solo singles – "Where It All Began", a ballad inspired by the Athens Olympic Games, in August 2004 and the dance track "Move Together" in April 2005. "Move Together" peaked at number 26 on the ARIA Singles Chart.

Chapple then moved onto working behind the scenes in the entertainment industry. She relocated to Singapore for several years, where she was a creative director for Ice TV's Asia's Next Top Model and Company Manager for the talent at Universal Studios Singapore. In 2014, she was creative director of the short-lived Las Vegas stage show, Sydney After Dark.

She later studied interior design at the National Design Academy in the United Kingdom and since 2017, has operated her own interior design business, House of Chapple.

In April 2020, to commemorate the 20th anniversary of Bardot's debut single "Poison", Chapple and former bandmates Tiffani Wood and Katie Underwood reunited remotely online to perform the song. In September 2021, it was announced that Chapple and Underwood would professionally reunite as a music duo under the name Ka'Bel, with their debut single "Broken Hearted" released on 15 October 2021.

In 2023 Chapple published a memoir outlining her time in Bardot called The Girl in the Band. The book became the basis of the 2023 fictional television series Paper Dolls, of which Chapple served as executive producer.

== Discography ==
=== Singles ===
List of singles, with selected chart positions
| Title | Year | Peak chart positions | Album |
| Title | Year | AUS | Album |
As lead artist
| "Where It All Began" | 2004 | — | Non-album singles |
| "Move Together" | 2005 | 26 | Non-album singles |
As part of Ka'Bel
| "Broken Hearted" | 2021 | — | Non-album singles |
| "Heartstrings" | 2022 | — | Non-album singles |
| "Follow" | 2023 | — | Non-album singles |
| "One In a Million" | 2024 | — | Non-album singles |

=== Other appearances ===
List of other appearances
| Song | Year | Album |
|---|---|---|
| "Take Me to the City" (Peachy Club Mix) | 2008 | DJ Masters Unmixed #8 |

== Notes ==
1.Ka'Bel is a collaboration between Chappel and Katie Underwood.
