= Blizzard Brothers =

Australian musical group

- Origin: Sydney, New South Wales, Australia
- Genres: Hardhouse
- Label: Shock
- Past members: Daniel Allan; Rob Brizzi

Blizzard Brothers (also known as Blizzard Brothers Inc.) were a hardhouse music duo, consisting of DJs, Daniel Allan and Rob Brizzi. They covered and remixed AC/DC's song, "Thunderstuck" and released it in Australia on 11 February 2002 as a single, which peaked at No. 30 on the ARIA Singles Chart. It also appeared on the German Singles Chart Top 100. For the track they used Peter Millwood as guest lead vocalist.

In December 2002 they issued their second single, which is a cover of "I Was Made for Lovin' You", originally by Kiss. Another track on this single, "Look at Me", was co-written by Allan and Brizzi with Carlotta Chadwick. Chadwick provided lead vocals and Allan was on backing vocals. Blizzard Brothers Inc. remixed "Alone" by Belgian dance group, Lasgo, which was released with that group's single.

Allan later went on to produce for European dance acts: Ian Van Dahl, Paps 'n' Scar and Lasgo. In Australia, he worked with Human Nature and Sophie Monk (producing a remix of "Inside Outside"). Allan also produced music for the travel and lifestyle television program, Getaway, and Channel 9's children's TV show, New MacDonalds Farm. Allan's music is featured in the 2003 Australian film, Fat Pizza.

== Discography ==
=== Singles ===
List of singles, with selected chart positions
Title	Year	Peak chart positions
Title	Year	AUS
"Thunderstuck"	2002	30
"I Was Made for Lovin' You"	2002	—
