= Chantelle Barry =

Australian musician and actress from Perth

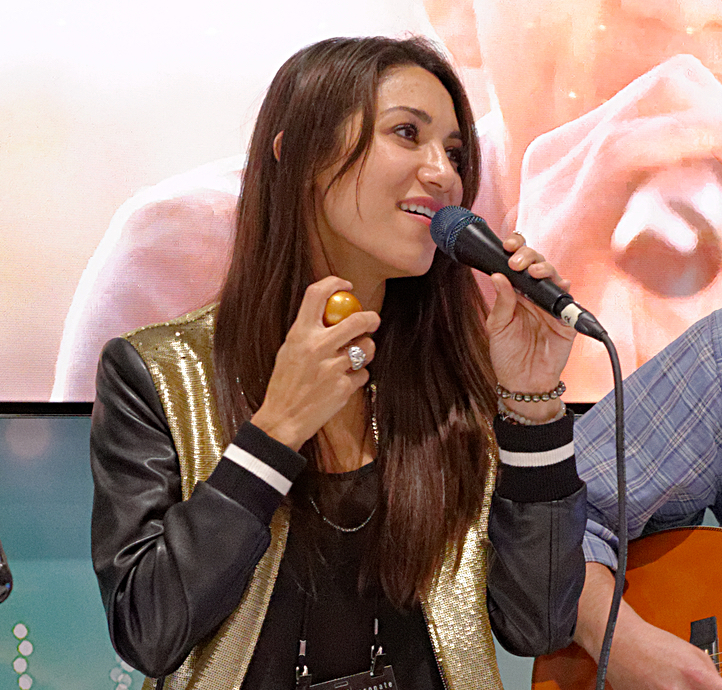
- Chantelle Barry in 2015
- Born: 18 March 1980 (age 46); Perth, Western Australia, Australia
- Occupations: Musician; actress
- Years active: 1999–present
- Spouse: Scott Whyte (m. 2018)
- Musical career
- Genre: Pop
- Years active: 1999–2000, 2005–present
- Labels: Mercury France; JOTU Collective
- Website: chantellebarry.com

Chantelle Barry (born 18 March 1980) is an Australian musician and actress from Perth, best known for being in the original line-up of girl group Bardot before leaving the group suddenly under controversial circumstances.

== Career ==
=== Music ===
In 1999, Barry auditioned for the first series of the Australian version of the talent show Popstars, competing against over 2,500 hopefuls who turned up to auditions around the country which required both singing and dancing experience. After a series of elimination rounds Barry, along with Belinda Chapple, Sophie Monk, Sally Polihronas and Katie Underwood were chosen to form a group and moved in together in Sydney to work on their debut single "Poison".

However, after only a few weeks Barry was asked to resign from the nascent, still-unnamed girl group after stealing money from Sophie Monk, but the reason for her departure was not revealed at the time. She first confirmed the circumstances around her departure in a 2006 appearance on the TV show Where Are They Now?, and further elaborated on the incident in later interviews. Barry states that she had taken Monk's weekly $100 money allowance from an envelope left in Barry's room with the intention of giving it back to her, but forgot to do so and was therefore removed from the group. Subsequently, she was paid $1000 and offered a solo record deal to leave the group and to stay silent on the matter at the time, leading to the widespread speculation over her firing. She blamed the incident on her youth and naivety, and felt burdened by it for years afterwards. She was replaced by Tiffani Wood in the final line-up of what would become Bardot. Polihronas would later state that Barry was "exploited" by the show and made out to be "the villain".

She later left Australia, and placed third in the Song of the Year songwriting contest, and reached the quarter-finals in the Music Nation online music competition.

In August 2009, she officially launched her debut solo album Simple Things in the U.S., followed by albums Songbird in 2012, and more recently, Lovers Gonna Love in 2018.

In 2020, Barry recorded her own version of "Poison".

=== Acting ===
Barry has appeared in several independent films and in small roles on the television series Water Rats, General Hospital, Entourage, How I Met Your Mother, The Paul Reiser Show and NCIS. In 2008 Barry played the recurring role of Nina, a friend of main character Naomi Clark on the television series 90210.

In 2016 she played the character of Tri in the web series Miss 2059. In 2018 Barry played the Valiant Comics character Roku, the main antagonist of the Ninjak vs. the Valiant Universe live-action miniseries.

Barry also works as a voice actor. In 2016, she played Ava Thorne in the Oculus Rift video game Edge of Nowhere, and is credited as the voice of the "Narrator" in an episode of the 2018 Netflix series Disjointed. Barry also did additional voice work for the video games Mad Max, Agents of Mayhem, Marvel's Spider-Man, Days Gone and voiced the character Chloe in Metal Gear Survive.

In 2019, Barry voiced Baphomet on the DC Universe web television series Doom Patrol, and provided the voice of Sheila in Spyro Reignited Trilogy. She voiced Ghost in 2020's Iron Man VR and Shael in 2021's Horizon Forbidden West. In 2024, Barry voiced Selina Kyle in Batman: Arkham Shadow, and Maya in Call of Duty: Black Ops 6's Zombies mode, a role she reprised in the sequel. In 2025, she voiced The Dowser in Death Stranding 2: On the Beach.

=== Other ===
Barry has appeared in two pictorials for FHM, one in the months after leaving Bardot and another in 2007.

== Personal life ==
Barry has been married to actor Scott Whyte, since December 2018. She has been based in Los Angeles since 2002.

Barry is of Burmese and Italian heritage.
