= Get the Music On =

2003 single by Sophie Monk

Single by Sophie Monk

from the album Calendar Girl
- B-side: "Shake"
- Released: 31 March 2003
- Length: 3:45
- Label: WEA
- Songwriters: Ray Hedges; Nigel Butler; Jon Pickering
- Producer: Ray Hedges

Sophie Monk singles chronology
"Inside Outside" (2002)	"Get the Music On" (2003)	"One Breath Away" (2003)

Music video
- "Get the Music On" on YouTube

"Get the Music On" is a song by Australian singer Sophie Monk, released as the second single from her debut solo album, Calendar Girl (2003). It was co-written and produced by Ray Hedges, who had previously worked with Monk on the Bardot single "I Need Somebody". "Get the Music On" was released on 31 March 2003 and peaked at number 10 on the Australian ARIA Singles Chart. Monk co-wrote the B-side, "Shake".

== Charts ==
Chart (2003)	Peak position
Australia (ARIA)	10
