= Bloke (disambiguation) =

Bloke is a slang term for a man.

Bloke may also refer to:

- Bloke (comics), a character in the Marvel Universe
- Municipality of Bloke, a municipality in southwestern Slovenia
- Bloke Plateau, a plateau in southwestern Slovenia
- "Bloke" (song), a 2000 comedy song by Chris Franklin
- "Bloke", a 2005 song by Republica from the album Republica

== See also ==
- Blokesworld, an Australian television series
- England, Half-English, only collaboration album by Billy Bragg and The Blokes
- Tim Mathieson, partner of Australian Prime Minister Julia Gillard known informally as "First Bloke"
- William Modisane or Bloke Modisane, South African writer, actor and journalist
