= Tommy Faragher =

American singer-songwriter

Thomas Edward Faragher is an American producer, composer, songwriter, singer, and arranger. He is originally from Redlands, California.

== Performer ==
Faragher started his career as a singer and keyboardist with his family, who formed a group called The Faragher Brothers. The group recorded two albums for ABC Records, The Faragher Brothers (1976) and Family Ties (1977), then two albums for Polydor Records, Open Your Eyes (1978) and The Faraghers (1979).

In 1983, Faragher became a featured artist on the soundtrack for Staying Alive, the sequel to Saturday Night Fever. Faragher earned a Grammy nomination for his work, including the song "'Look Out For Number One" and another song, "(We Dance) So Close to the Fire'" which he composed himself.

As a keyboardist and vocalist, Faragher worked over the years as a session musician contributing to artists such as, Peter Criss, Melissa Manchester, Ringo Starr, Dusty Springfield, The Pointer Sisters, Patti Austin, Chris Thompson, Randy Edelman, Lou Rawls and Robbie Nevil.

== Producer and songwriter ==
Faragher signed a publishing deal with 20th Century Fox in 1980 and wrote songs for Peter Criss and Dusty Springfield. In 1985 Faragher produced the Vanity album Skin on Skin for Motown giving him a top ten R&B single with his composition "Under the Influence" co-written with Robbie Nevil & Tony Haynes.

Signing a publishing deal with MCA Music in 1986 brought Faragher to New York where he produced records for Brenda K Starr, The Jets, Elisa Fiorillo and Arthur Baker. In 1989, Faragher wrote the top five hit "With Every Beat of My Heart" for Taylor Dayne. He produced the Paul Young number one Adult Contemporary hit "What Becomes of the Brokenhearted" for the Fried Green Tomatoes soundtrack.

Writing and producing tracks for The O'Jays, Al Green, Evelyn Champagne King and Richard Elliot for much of the first part of the 1990s, Faragher wrote and produced the top fifteen hit The Right Kind Of Love performed by Jeremy Jordan for the Beverly Hills, 90210 soundtrack. Following that, Faragher wrote and produced a top five record in England, "Oh Baby I..." for the girl group Eternal. Faragher signed a publishing deal as staff writer for Warner Chappell Music in 1996.

In 2000, Faragher was an on-screen music producer for the Australian hit TV show Pop Stars, which spawned the American Idol phenomenon. As executive music producer for the project he mixed the Bardot album which shot to number one on the Australian charts as well as the single "Poison" which also went to number one. Faragher also wrote and produced the single "I Should Have Never Let You Go" which made the top fifteen in Australia. Faragher signed a worldwide publishing deal with Sony Australia in 2001.

== Glee ==
Faragher produced a song for Glee, a cover of Katy Perry's "Teenage Dream". The song went to number one on Billboard's Digital Downloads chart on November 16, 2010. It also went to number eight on Billboard's Hot 100. The cover is Glee's biggest song to date, with 214,000 copies sold in the first week. He also did "Hey, Soul Sister" for Glee. It was a cover of the Train song of the same name.

He also produced "Bills Bills Bills," "When I Get You Alone," "SIlly Love Songs," "Animal," "Candles," "Raise Your Glass," "Misery," "What Kind Of Fool," "Somewhere Only We Know," and "Do Ya Think I'm Sexy?" for Glee. A Dalton Academy Warblers album is to be released April 19, 2011.

== Discography (Singles) ==
Song	Artist	Job	Chart Peak
"Teenage Dream (Glee Cast Version)"	Glee Cast	Producer	8 (Hot 100), 1 (Digital Downloads)
"With Every Beat of My Heart"	Taylor Dayne	Writer	5 (Hot 100)
"The Right Kind of Love"	Jeremy Jordan	Producer/Writer	4 (Airplay), 14 (Hot 100)
"What Becomes of the Broken Hearted"	Paul Young	Producer	1 (Adult Contemporary), 22 (Hot 100)
"Under the Influence"	Vanity	Producer/Writer	6 (Dance), 9 (R&B), 56 (Hot 100)
"Oh Baby I..."	Eternal	Producer/Writer	4 (Pop, UK)
"Sweet Funky Thing"	Eternal	Producer/Writer	1 (Dance, UK)
"I Should've Never Let You Go"	Bardot	Producer/Writer	4 (Australasian), 14 (Australia)
"These Days"	Bardot	Producer	19 (Australia)
"If You Want Me"	Hinda Hicks	Producer/Writer	25 (UK)
"Got to Give Me Love"	Dana Dawson	Producer/Writer	27 (UK)
"I Pray"	Alysha Warren	Producer/Writer	1 (Dance, UK)
"Stay the Night"	The Faragher Brothers	Writer	48 (Hot 100)
"Sooner or Later"	GF4	Producer	11 (Australia)
"Some People"	E. G. Daily	Producer/Writer	33 (Dance)
