= Love Will Find a Way =

Love Will Find a Way may refer to the following songs:

- "Love Will Find a Way", a song composed by Harold Fraser-Simson, with lyrics by Harry Graham, from the 1917 operetta The Maid of the Mountains
- "Love Will Find a Way", a song composed by Eubie Blake, with lyrics by Noble Sissle, from the 1921 musical Shuffle Along
- "Love Will Find a Way", the b-side to 1963 Sam Cooke single "Another Saturday Night"
- "Love Will Find a Way", a single from the 1969 Jackie DeShannon album Put a Little Love in Your Heart
- "Love Will Find a Way" (Pablo Cruise song), a 1978 single from the album Worlds Away
- "Love Will Find a Way", a song from the 1983 Lionel Richie album Can't Slow Down
- "Love Will Find a Way" (Yes song), a single from 1987 album Big Generator
- "Love Will Find a Way", a song from the 1990 Donovan live album Rising
- "Love Will Find a Way", a Dionne Warwick duet with her cousin Whitney Houston from the 1993 Dionne Warwick album Friends Can Be Lovers
- "Love Will Find a Way" (Disney song), a song from the 1998 musical film The Lion King II: Simba's Pride
- "Love Will Find a Way", a song from the 1999 Christina Aguilera album Christina Aguilera
- "Love Will Find a Way" (Bardot song), a 2002 single from the 2001 album Play It Like That
- "Love Will Find a Way" (Delirious? song) a single from the 2008 album Kingdom of Comfort

Love Will Find a Way may also refer to the following music albums:

- Love Will Find a Way (Pharoah Sanders album), a 1978 jazz album, which includes the Bedria Sanders-penned song "Love Will Find a Way"
- Love Will Find a Way (Philip Bailey album), a 2019 jazz album also featuring the Bedria Sanders-penned "Love Will Find a Way" featuring Casey Benjamin

== See also ==
- "Find a Way" (Amy Grant song), a 1985 uptempo pop song with the chorus "Love Will Find a Way"
- "Love Song" (Tesla song), a 1989 power ballad with the chorus "Love Will Find a Way"
