= List of number-one albums of 2000 (Australia) =

ARIA Charts number-one albums of 2000 < 1990s 2001 >

Other Australian number-one charts of 2000
- singles

Top Australian singles and albums of 2000
- Triple J Hottest 100
- top 25 singles
- top 25 albums

These are the Australian number-one albums of 2000, per the ARIA Charts.

Key
The yellow background indicates the #1 album on ARIA's End of Year Albums Chart of 2000.

Issue date	Album	Artist	Weeks at number one (total)
3 January	On How Life Is	Macy Gray	8 weeks
10 January	On How Life Is	Macy Gray	8 weeks
17 January	On How Life Is	Macy Gray	8 weeks
24 January	On How Life Is	Macy Gray	8 weeks
31 January	On How Life Is	Macy Gray	8 weeks
7 February	On How Life Is	Macy Gray	8 weeks
14 February	On How Life Is	Macy Gray	8 weeks
21 February	On How Life Is	Macy Gray	8 weeks
28 February	Play	Moby	3 weeks
6 March	Supernatural	Santana	2 weeks
13 March	Supernatural	Santana	2 weeks
20 March	Reflector	Killing Heidi	6 weeks
27 March	Reflector	Killing Heidi	6 weeks
3 April	Reflector	Killing Heidi	6 weeks
10 April	The Power	Vanessa Amorosi	1 week
17 April	Reflector	Killing Heidi	6 weeks
24 April	Reflector	Killing Heidi	6 weeks
1 May	Reflector	Killing Heidi	6 weeks
8 May	Bardot	Bardot	1 week
15 May	Affirmation	Savage Garden	6 weeks
22 May	Binaural	Pearl Jam	1 week
29 May	Mad Season	Matchbox Twenty	5 weeks
5 June	Crush	Bon Jovi	1 week
12 June	Mad Season	Matchbox Twenty	5 weeks
19 June	Mad Season	Matchbox Twenty	5 weeks
26 June	Mad Season	Matchbox Twenty	5 weeks
3 July	Mad Season	Matchbox Twenty	5 weeks
10 July	Affirmation	Savage Garden	6 weeks
17 July	In Blue	The Corrs	1 week
24 July	Upstyledown	28 Days	1 week
31 July	Play	Moby	3 weeks
7 August	Play	Moby	3 weeks
14 August	33⅓	John Farnham	4 weeks
21 August	33⅓	John Farnham	4 weeks
28 August	33⅓	John Farnham	4 weeks
4 September	33⅓	John Farnham	4 weeks
11 September	Odyssey Number Five	Powderfinger	3 weeks
18 September	Odyssey Number Five	Powderfinger	3 weeks
25 September	The Games of the XXVII Olympiad: Official Music from the Opening Ceremony	Various	3 weeks
2 October	The Games of the XXVII Olympiad: Official Music from the Opening Ceremony	Various	3 weeks
9 October	The Games of the XXVII Olympiad: Official Music from the Opening Ceremony	Various	3 weeks
16 October	Light Years	Kylie Minogue	1 week
23 October	Chocolate Starfish and the Hot Dog Flavored Water	Limp Bizkit	1 week
30 October	Odyssey Number Five	Powderfinger	3 weeks
6 November	All That You Can't Leave Behind	U2	2 weeks
13 November	All That You Can't Leave Behind	U2	2 weeks
20 November	1	The Beatles	9 weeks
27 November	1	The Beatles	9 weeks
4 December	1	The Beatles	9 weeks
11 December	1	The Beatles	9 weeks
18 December	1	The Beatles	9 weeks
25 December	1	The Beatles	9 weeks

== Notes ==
- Number of number one albums: 19
- Longest run at number one (during 2000): On How Life Is by Macy Gray (8 weeks)

== See also ==
- 2000 in music
- List of number-one singles in Australia in 2000
