= Made in London =

British girl group formed in 1999

Made In London
- Origin: United Kingdom
- Genres: Pop; R&B
- Years active: 2000
- Label: RCA
- Past members: Kelly Bryant; Sherene Dyer; Marianne Eide; Melissa Popo

Made in London were a girl group made up of three members, British Kelly Bryant and Sherene Dyer, and Norwegian Marianne Eide, who released several records in 2000. The band was founded by Melissa Popo and Peter Ibsen. Peter Ibsen co-wrote the whole album with the lead singer/songwriter Sherene Dyer and the band. Melissa Popo left the band before they released any of their singles.

Despite wide publicity, particularly surrounding their second single, "Shut Your Mouth", combined with a certain amount of internet-based success, their most successful chart hit was "Dirty Water" which reached number 15 in the UK Singles Chart in May 2000. Following the release of "Wishing Well", a cover version of the 1987 Terence Trent D'Arby song, the group disbanded.

Australian girl group Bardot later covered "Dirty Water" for their second album, Play It Like That.

The trio's debut album 'Perfect Storm' was planned to be released after "Shut Your Mouth". However, as "Shut Your Mouth" did not garner the anticipated chart success (UK #74), the album was cancelled prior to its release. It was eventually made available on streaming services in March 2022.

Former member, Sherene Dyer, is now known professionally as Sherii Ven Dyer and still performs as of 2023.

== Discography ==
=== Studio albums ===
- A Perfect Storm (2000)
