= Accidental Heroes =

Accidental Heroes may refer to:

- Accidental Heroes (TV series), a 2020 Australian television series
- Accidental Heroes, a novel by Danielle Steel
