= Bite Your Tongue =

Studio album by Tiffani Wood
- Released: 14 October 2006
- Recorded: 2004–2006
- Genre: Pop rock
- Label: Mudhoney Records
- Producer: Richie Goncalves; Paul Wiltshire; Michael Stangel; Tony Cvetkovski

Tiffani Wood chronology
Bite Your Tongue (2006)	Acoustic Dreams: Lullabies for Babies (2008)

Singles from Bite Your Tongue
- 1. "Devil in Your Soul" Released: 18 July 2005; 2. "Spin the Bottle" Released: 3 April 2006; 3. "I Touch Myself" Released: 9 September 2006

Professional ratings
Review scores
Source	Rating
Herald Sun	3/5 stars

Bite Your Tongue is the debut solo album by Australian singer-songwriter Tiffani Wood. It was released in Australia on 14 October 2006 through Wood's own independent record label Mudhoney Records.

== Album information ==
The album was recorded over two years during 2005 and 2006, excluding "The Mirror" which was originally released in 2004 as a b-side to Wood's debut solo single on Warner Music, "What R U Waiting 4". All songs on the album are co-written by Wood, excluding the Divinyls cover of "I Touch Myself".

Herald Sun music reporter Cameron Adams gave the album three stars, stating, "Wood hasn't got the budget for hot overseas hitmakers, but has a powerful voice and never sounds out of depth amid heavy guitars...In a word: sassy".

== Track listing ==
1. "Intro (Phone Talk)" – 0:30
2. "Devil in Your Soul" (T. Wood, R. Goncalves) – 3.41
3. "Spin the Bottle" (T. Wood, E. Sherlock) – 2.59
4. "I Touch Myself" (C. Amphlett, M. Mcentee, B. Steinberg, T. Kelly) – 3.25
5. "Wake Up" (T. Wood, E. Sherlock) – 3.31
6. "The Mirror" (T. Wood, J. Kempster) – 3.47
7. "I Told You" (T. Wood, S. Hawksley) – 3.35
8. "9 Lives" (T. Wood, P. Wiltshire, M. Stangel) – 3.22
9. "Ain't Dun Nuthin' To U" (T. Wood, R. Goncalves) – 3:19
10. "Head" (T. Wood, A. Dahal) – 3:15
11. "Free Your Mind" (T. Wood, A. Dahal) – 3:15

== Production credits ==
- Tracks 1, 2, 3, 4, 5, 7, 8, 10, 11 produced by Richie Goncalves
- Track 9 produced and mixed by Paul Wiltshire and Michael Strangel for PLW Productions
- Track 6 produced and mixed by Tony Cvetkovski
- Tracks 4, 5, 7, 9, 11 mixed by James Katski
- Tracks 2, 3, 10 mixed by Peter Mayes
- Tracks 1, 4, 5, 7, 8, 9, 11 mastered by Rick O'Neil
- Tracks 2, 3, 10 mastered by Steve Smart
- Track 8 mastered by David Macquarie
