= Play It Like That =

Studio album by Bardot
- Released: 12 November 2001
- Recorded: 2001
- Genre: Pop, R&B, dance
- Length: 45:30
- Label: Warner Music Australia
- Producer: Michael Szumowski, Michael D'Arcy, Phil Burton, Ray Hedges, Murlyn Music, Ollie J

Bardot chronology
Bardot (2000)	Play It Like That (2001)

Singles from Play It Like That
- 1. "ASAP" Released: 16 July 2001; 2. "I Need Somebody" Released: 22 October 2001; 3. "Love Will Find a Way" Released: 18 February 2002

Professional ratings
Review scores
Source	Rating
The Advertiser	3.5/5 stars
Herald Sun	3/5 stars

Play It Like That is the second and final studio album by Australian pop group Bardot, released by Warner Music Australia on 12 November 2001.

The album peaked at number 16 on the Australian album charts and produced the singles "ASAP", "I Need Somebody" – both which placed top 5 on the Australian singles chart – and "Love Will Find a Way".

== Background and release ==
Play It Like That was Bardot's first and only album as a four-piece, following Katie Underwood's departure in mid-2001. Underwood had recorded vocals on "ASAP" and the b-side "Hit 'N' Run" during the album's earlier sessions, however these vocals were removed after she left.

Recorded throughout 2001 in both Australia and the United Kingdom, Play It Like That presented a more sophisticated sound for the group with greater disco, UK garage, R&B and funk influences. Bardot worked with international producers Ray Hedges, Swedish production team Murlyn, and Ollie Jacobs. Locally they teamed up with Human Nature singer and producer Phil Burton, Michael D'Arcy, the Dowlut brothers, and Michael Szumowski. Members of the group co-wrote on four songs, which Sally Polihronas believed, “Because we’ve all put so much into this, into writing the songs and into creating a really great second album, it reveals a lot about who we are. I hear stories about myself, I hear Soph and Tiff and Belinda. So much of us is in there.”

In 2014, a demo likely recorded for the album called "He's Gotta Go" was uploaded to SoundCloud. Amanda Bloom is credited as songwriter with Michael D'Arcy credited as producer.

In January 2021, Play It Like That was released on vinyl for the very first time, along with Bardot's debut album, to mark the group's 20 year anniversary.

Dirty Water, which appears on this album, was originally released by the UK based group "Made in London" in May 2000. The single peaked at No.15 on the UK's Official Top 40 charts.

== Commercial performance ==
The album was only a modest success compared to the performance of their debut, peaking at number 16 on the Australian album charts and spending seven weeks in the top 100. It earned gold status for shipments of 35,000 copies.

== Critical reception ==
The album received positive reviews from critics. Herald Sun music editor Cameron Adams gave the album 3 stars, stating, "Bardot, more comfortable now being pop artists than just Popstars, get a big red elephant stamp for improvement with their second album." Ninemsn wrote, "they have served their apprenticeship, and deserve the success that they have worked hard for. Play It Like That will certainly launch them into the international circuit and turn heads." The Advertiser gave the album 3 1/2 stars, stating "[Bardot's] greater musical input has paid dividends. The album has a fresher, more inspired sound." Australian music site Undercover believed the album was "a mighty creative leap [...] You are forgiven for placing nil expectation of a new Bardot album, but coming from that perspective Play It Like That is a real treat."

== Track listing ==
Standard edition
No.	Title	Writer(s)	Producer(s)	Length
1.	"Play It Like That"	Ollie Jacobs; Phillip Jacobs; Mary Anne Morgan; Ron St Louis	Ollie Jacobs	3:34
2.	"I Need Somebody"	Ray Hedges; Nigel Butler; John Pickering	Hedges	3:26
3.	"Feel Right"	Sophie Monk; Sally Polihronas; Michael Szumowski	Szumowski	3:55
4.	"ASAP"	Fredrik Ödesjö; Henrik Jonback; John McLaughlin	Ödesjö	3:43
5.	"Don't Call Me, I'll Call You"	Belinda Chapple; Michael D'Arcy	D'Arcy, Phil Burton	3:38
6.	"Love Will Find a Way"	Ollie J; Phillip Jacobs; Patrick McMahon; Miki More	Ollie Jacobs	3:16
7.	"Dirty Water"	Kelly Bryant; Sherene Dyer; Marianne Eide; Pete Ibsen; Melissa Popo; Mike Steer	Szumowski	3:54
8.	"You Got Me Feeling"	Polihronas; Philippe-Marc Anquetil; Christopher Lee-Joe	Szumowski	4:05
9.	"It's Alright"	Traci Hale; Tricky Stewart; Laney Stewart; Tab	Dennis Dowlut; Darren Dowlut	4:09
10.	"Before I Let You Go"	Dowlut; Dowlut; Richard Goncalves	Dowlut; Dowlut	3:56
11.	"Girls of the Night"	Chapple; Tiffani Wood; D'Arcy	D'Arcy; Burton	4:31
12.	"When the Cat's Away"	Ödesjö; Jonback; McLaughlin	Ödesjö	3:45
Total length:				45:30

== Charts ==
Chart (2001)	Peak position
Australian Albums (ARIA)	16

== Certifications ==
Region	Certification	Certified units/sales
Australia (ARIA)	Gold	35,000^{^}
^{^} Shipments figures based on certification alone.
