= Sister (Sister2Sister song) =

1999 single by Sister2Sister

Single by Sister2Sister

from the album One
- B-side: "Wait"
- Released: 4 October 1999
- Length: 3:29
- Label: Standard
- Songwriters: Pam Reswick, Steve Werfel, Joe Muscat
- Producers: Pam Reswick, Joe Muscat

Sister2Sister singles chronology
"Sister" (1999)	"What's a Girl to Do?" (2000)

Alternative covers
- UK cover

Alternative cover
- RemixSister cover

"Sister" is the debut single by Australian pop music duo Sister2Sister, released on 4 October 1999. It reached number three in Australia, number 14 in New Zealand, number 18 on the UK Singles Chart, and number 50 in Ireland.

== Charts performance ==
In Australia, the single was a huge success. It debuted on the ARIA Singles Chart at number 14, then after several weeks climbed inside the top 10; it peaked at number three on 12 December 1999. It spent a total of 20 weeks inside the top 50.

In New Zealand, the single debuted on the RIANZ Singles Chart at number 14 and fell out quickly, spending eight weeks in the top 50. Two weeks after leaving the top 50, it re-entered at number 26, then fell and rose for a further five weeks before exiting for the last time, bringing its week total to 14.

On the UK Singles Chart, "Sister" debuted at number 18, before falling 17 places the next week. It spent two more weeks in the top 100, bringing its total weeks to four. In Ireland, the song spent one week in the top 50, reaching number 50, then dropped out the next week.

== Track listings ==
Australian CD single

1. "Sister"
2. "Wait"

Australian remix CD

1. "Sister" (Single mix)
2. "Sister" (Urban Radio Mix)
3. "Sister" (Platform 73 Mix)
4. "Sister" (La Funk Mix)
5. "Sister" (London House Mix)

UK single

1. "Sister"
2. "Sister" (Urban Radio Mix)
3. "Wait"

UK cassette single

1. "Sister"
2. "Sister" (Tuff Sister Mix)

== Charts ==
=== Weekly charts ===
Chart (1999–2000)	Peak position
Australia (ARIA)	3
Europe (Eurochart Hot 100)	73
Ireland (IRMA)	50
New Zealand (Recorded Music NZ)	14
Scottish Singles Sales (Official Charts)	18
UK Singles (Official Charts)	18
UK Indie (Official Charts)	6

=== Year-end charts ===
Chart (1999)	Position
Australia (ARIA)	28

== Certifications ==
Region	Certification	Certified units/sales
Australia (ARIA)	Platinum	70,000^{^}
^{^} Shipments figures based on certification alone.

== Release history ==
Region	Date	Format(s)	Label(s)	Ref.
Australia	4 October 1999	CD	Standard	
United Kingdom	10 April 2000	CD; cassette	Mushroom	
United States	25 July 2000	Contemporary hit radio	C2	
