= Green and Gold (Song for the Socceroos) =

Single by Freedom of Thought
- Released: May 2006
- Studio: Tiger Studios
- Label: Universal Music Australia
- Songwriter(s): Adrian Martinez, Jeremy Idiclas, Robert Lupica, Rodrigo Sandoval, Santiago Veloso

"Green and Gold (Song for the Socceroos)" is the debut and only single by Australian ensemble Freedom of Thought. The song was released in 2006 and peaked at number 26 on the ARIA Charts.

== Background and release ==
In May 2006, Julia Zemiro hosted the one-off SBS series Song for the Socceroos, a talent show in search of a theme song for the Australian Socceroos soccer team for the 2006 FIFA World Cup. The group Freedom of Thought won the competition with their song "Green and Gold".

== Track listing ==
1. "Green and Gold" (by Freedom of Thought)
2. "Here Come the Socceroos" (by Chris Franklin with John Duffin and John Brittain)

== Charts ==
Chart (2006)	Peak position
Australia (ARIA)	26
