= Paper Dolls (Australian TV series) =

2023 Australian drama television series

- Genre: Drama
- Created by: Ainslie Clouston
- Written by: Ainslie Clouston; David Hannam; Marieke Hardy; Sara Khan; Jenna Purcell
- Directed by: Erin White; Nina Buxton; Tenika Smith; Lynn-Maree Danzey
- Starring: Emalia; Courtney Clarke; Miah Madden; Courtney Monsma; Naomi Sequeira; Emma Booth; Ditch Davey; Thomas Cocquerel
- Music by: Rafael May; Janeva Burrill
- Country of origin: Australia
- Original language: English
- No. of seasons: 1
- No. of episodes: 8

Production
- Executive producer: Belinda Chapple
- Production location: Sydney
- Production company: Helium Pictures

Original release
- Network: Paramount+
- Release: 3 December 2023

Paper Dolls is an Australian drama television series created by Ainslie Clouston, based on an idea by Belinda Chapple. The series is distributed by Paramount+.

At the 2024 ARIA Music Awards, This is Harlow was nominated for Best Original Soundtrack or Musical Theatre Cat Album.

== Premise ==
The show follows five aspiring singers, who are thrust into the spotlight as the pop girl group HARLOW, after being discovered on a reality television show Pop Rush.

== Cast and characters ==
=== Main ===
- Emalia as Izzy James
- Miah Madden as Charlie Levett
- Courtney Clarke as Jade Hart
- Naomi Sequeira as Annabel Tonkin
- Courtney Monsma as Lillian Milton
- Emma Booth as Margot Murray, an executive producer for Harlow's record label who works closely with Harlow
- Thomas Cocquerel as Teddy Pearce, Harlow's manager
- Ditch Davey as Roger Levett, the head of Harlow's record label

=== Recurring ===
- Fay Du Chateau as Jenny, the group's costume stylist
- Gantanter Singh Gill as Marty, a reality show sound recordist
- Scott Lee as Rob, a reality show camera operator
- Lyndon Watts as Rory, the group's choreographer
- Ben Turland as Eli

== Episodes ==
No. overall	No. in season	Title	Directed by	Written by	Original release date
1	1	"The Reinvention of Izzy James"	Tenika Smith	Ainslie Clouston	3 December 2023
2	2	"Phoenix Rising"	Tenika Smith	Ainslie Clouston	3 December 2023
3	3	"Be a Maneater"	Nina Buxton	David Hannam	3 December 2023
4	4	"Technicolour Altar"	Nina Buxton	Marieke Hardy	10 December 2023
5	5	"Face Off"	Nina Buxton	Ainslie Clouston and Jenna Purcell	17 December 2023
6	6	"We're on Tour, Bitches"	Erin White	Sara Khan	24 December 2023
7	7	"The Fame Game"	Erin White	Thomas Wilson-White	31 December 2023
8	8	"New Millennium"	Erin White and Lynn-Maree Danzey	Ainslie Clouston	7 January 2024

== Production ==
The series is executive produced by Belinda Chapple and airs on Paramount+. Filming took place at the National Institute of Dramatic Art (NIDA) at its Sydney campus. The series debuted on 3 December 2023 and it will air on Network 10 later in 2024.

== EP Track listing ==
This is Harlow (Music from Paper Dolls)
No.	Title	Writer(s)	Length
1.	"Monster"	David Björk, Ilira Gashi, Roxanne Emery	3:23
2.	"Can't Touch"	Robby De Sá, Janeva	2:29
3.	"All Night"	E. Carmona, Tormod Løkling, Henrik Moreborg, H. Wilson	3:06
4.	"Your Body"	De Sá, Janeva	2:44
5.	"Back On Top"	Kayla Bonnici, Joel Chapman, Christian Lo Russo, Kayla Rae Haywood	2:46
6.	"Fame"	Michael Gore, Dean Pitchford	2:37
Total length:			17:09
