= Too Many Times (Sister2Sister song) =

- Australian CD1

Single by Sister2Sister

from the album One
- B-side: "My Baby"
- Released: 17 July 2000
- Recorded: 1999
- Genre: Pop
- Length: 3:16
- Label: Standard Records
- Songwriter(s): MUSCAT/ROSSER/MUSCAT/DELTITO/DALE

Sister2Sister singles chronology
"What's a Girl to Do?" (2000)	"Too Many Times" (2000)

Alternative covers
- Australian CD2

"Too Many Times" is a song by Australian pop music duo Sister2Sister, released in July 2000 as the third and final single from their debut album One.

== Track listings ==
Australian CD1

1. "Too Many Times"
2. "Too Many Times" (2 Step Radio Mix)
3. "Too Many Times" (Get It Up Radio Mix)
4. "My Baby"
5. "What's a Girl to Do?" (Urban Mix)

Australian CD2

1. "Too Many Times"
2. "What's a Girl to Do?" (Live on The Panel)
3. "Too Many Times" (2 Step radio mix)
4. "What's a Girl to Do?" (Allmighty mix)
5. "Too Many Times" (video)

== Charts ==
Chart (2000)	Peak position
Australia (ARIA)	35

== Release history ==
Country	Release date	Format	Label	Catalogue
Australia (CD1)	11 July 2000	CD single	Standard	STD7005
Australia (CD2)	11 September 2000	CD single	Standard	STR7005
