= One Breath Away =

2003 single by Sophie Monk

Single by Sophie Monk

from the album Calendar Girl
- B-side: "Come My Way" (club mix)
- Released: 21 July 2003
- Length: 3:41
- Label: WEA
- Songwriters: Paul Barry; Mark Taylor; Steve Torch
- Producers: Gary Miller (album version); Adam Reily, Bryon Jones (single version)

Sophie Monk singles chronology
"Get the Music On" (2003)	"One Breath Away" (2003)	"Nice to Meet You" (2021)

Music video
- "One Breath Away" on YouTube

"One Breath Away" is a song by Australian singer Sophie Monk, released as the third single from her debut album, Calendar Girl (2003), on 21 July 2003. The song was re-recorded and mixed for single release. The album version was produced by Garry Miller while the single version was produced by Adam Reily and Bryon Jones. The single peaked at number 23 on the Australian Singles Chart in August 2003.

== Charts ==
Chart (2003)	Peak position
Australia (ARIA)	23
