= What Are You Waiting For (Lindsay Lohan song) =

Song by Lindsay Lohan

from the album Confessions of a Teenage Drama Queen
- Released: February 17, 2004
- Genre: Pop rock
- Length: 3:19
- Label: Hollywood Records
- Songwriters: Matthew Gerrard; Bridget Benenate; Steve Booker
- Producer: Bridget Benenate

"What Are You Waiting For" is a song performed by American actress and singer Lindsay Lohan. It was included on the Confessions of a Teenage Drama Queen soundtrack, released in February 2004 through Hollywood Records. It was written by Matthew Gerrard, Bridget Benenate, and Steve Booker.

Australian singer-songwriter Tiffani Wood released a version stylised as "What R U Waiting 4" for her debut solo single, in March of the same year.

== Production and recording ==
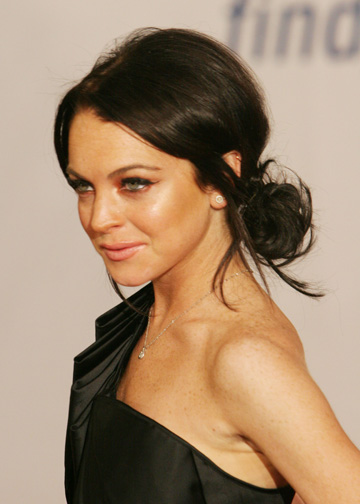
Lindsay Lohan originally performed the song.

"What Are You Waiting For" was written by Matthew Gerrard, Bridget Benenate, Steve Booker, and was produced by Benenate. It was performed by Lindsay Lohan for the soundtrack of Confessions of a Teenage Drama Queen, in which Lohan starred. It is one of four songs Lohan recorded for the soundtrack.

== Composition ==
According to the sheet music published at Musicnotes.com by Alfred Publishing, the song is written in the key of C major and is set in time signature of common time with a tempo of 92 beats per minute. Wood's vocal range spans two octaves, from G_{3} to E_{5}.

== Tiffani Wood version ==
"What R U Waiting 4"

Single by Tiffani Wood
- Released: 15 March 2004
- Genre: Pop rock
- Length: 3:28
- Label: WEA; Warner
- Songwriters: Matthew Gerrard; Bridget Benenate; Steve Booker
- Producer: Tony Cvetkovski

Tiffani Wood singles chronology
"What R U Waiting 4" (2004)	"Devil in Your Soul" (2005)

Australian singer-songwriter Tiffani Wood released a version stylised as "What R U Waiting 4" for her debut solo single in March 2004. "What R U Waiting 4" was Wood's first release following the disbandment of Australian girl group Bardot.

The single was a moderate success, peaking at number 27 and spending six weeks on the Australian top 50 singles chart.

=== Track listing ===
- CD single
1. "What R U Waiting 4" – 3:28
2. "The Mirror" – 3:49
3. "U & I" – 3:45
4. "What R U Waiting 4" (Instrumental) – 3:24

=== Charts ===
Chart (2004)	Peak position
Australia (ARIA)	27

== Other cover versions ==
"What Are You Waiting For" was used in the film Bratz: Rock Angelz (2005), and featured on its respective soundtrack under the name "Change the World".

American singer-songwriter Natalie Grant released a cover of the song on her fourth studio album Awaken in 2005.
