= One (Sister2Sister album) =

Studio album by Sister2Sister
- Released: 12 June 2000
- Genre: Pop
- Length: 37:36
- Label: Standard, Mushroom
- Producer: Joe Muscat, Pam Reswick

Singles from One
- 1. "Sister" Released: October 1999; 2. "What's a Girl to Do?" Released: February 2000; 3. "Too Many Times" Released: 11 July 2000

One is the debut and only album released by Australian pop music duo Sister2Sister. It was released in June 2000 and peaked at number 3 on the ARIA charts.

== Track listing ==
One
No.	Title	Writer(s)	Length
1.	"Sister"	Christine Muscat, Sharon Muscat, Joe Muscat, Pam Reswick, Werfel	3:26
2.	"Differently"	Muscat, Muscat, Muscat, George Merril, Shannon Rubicam	3:24
3.	"Never Like That"	Muscat, Muscat, Muscat, Parde	3:45
4.	"What's a Girl to Do?"	Muscat, Muscat, Muscat, Reswick, Werfel	3:27
5.	"Tender"	Muscat, Muscat, Muscat, Reswick, Werfel	3:52
6.	"Too Many Times"	Muscat, Muscat, Muscat, Dale, Deltito	3:16
7.	"How Could You Doubt Me?"	Muscat, Muscat, Muscat, Reswick	4:01
8.	"Friend of Mine"	Muscat, Muscat, Muscat, Juarez, Reswick	4:14
9.	"Too Close to Heaven"	Muscat, Muscat, Muscat, Reswick, Werfel	4:19
10.	"Count On Me"	Muscat, Muscat, Muscat, Rick Price	3:56

One (Limited Edition bonus disc)
No.	Title	Length
1.	"Sister" (Platform73 Mix)
2.	"Sister" (La Funk Mix)
3.	"Sister" (London House Mix)
4.	"What's a Girl to Do?" (Urban Mix)
5.	"What's a Girl to Do?" (Extended Boy Mix)

== Charts ==
=== Weekly charts ===
Chart (2000)	Peak position
Australian Albums (ARIA)	3
New Zealand Albums (RMNZ)	27

=== Year-end charts ===
Chart (2000)	Position
Australian Albums (ARIA)	93

== Certifications ==
Region	Certification	Certified units/sales
Australia (ARIA)	Gold	35,000^{^}
^{^} Shipments figures based on certification alone.

== Release history ==
Region	Date	Label	Format	Catalogue
Australia	12 June 2000	Mushroom Records	CD	(0119912MSH)
