= Accidental Heroes (TV series) =

- Genre: Light Entertainment, Comedy
- Presented by: Nick Cody; Sophie Monk
- Country of origin: Australia
- Original language: English
- No. of seasons: 1
- No. of episodes: 10

Original release
- Network: Nine Network
- Release: 9 April 2020 – present

Accidental Heroes is an Australian light entertainment series that features funny moments caught on camera, when ordinary people accidentally end up as internet viral sensations. It is produced by the Nine Network, and hosted by Nick Cody and Sophie Monk.

The series was filmed in 2017 and announced as part of its programming slate for that year, but wasn't screened. With holes in their schedule in 2020 due to the COVID-19 pandemic, the series premiered with a double episode on 9 April 2020. The series was placed on hiatus from 23 April, before returning on 13 June 2020.
