= FHM Australia =

Australian men's lifestyle magazine

For Him Magazine (FHM)

- Cover of the October 2019 issue
- Categories: Men's lifestyle
- Frequency: Monthly
- Publisher: ACP Magazines (1998-2012); Nuclear Media (2025-present)
- Founded: 1998
- First issue: April 1998 (first period); October 2025 (second period)
- Final issue: May 2012
- Company: ACP Magazines (1998-2012); Nuclear Media (2025-present)
- Country: Australia
- Based in: Sydney
- Language: English
- Website: fhmaustralia.com
- ISSN: 1440-3358

FHM is the Australian edition of the British monthly men's lifestyle magazine called FHM. The magazine was published between April 1998 and May 2012 in Australia. FHM Australia is relaunched in October 2025.

== History and profile ==
FHM Australia was first published in April 1998. The founding company was EMAP Australia. The magazine was part of and published by ACP Magazines. The company acquired EMAP Australia in 2008. The headquarters was in Sydney. Guy Mosel served as the editor-in-chief of the magazine, which was published on a monthly basis.

In 2006, Lauryn Eagle won the FHM Lara Croft Challenge involved physical challenges of shooting, running, ropes, ladders, 4-wheel driving and swimming. FHM Australia went defunct with its May 2012 issue.

== Relaunch ==
The FHM Australia magazine relaunched its print issue in October 2025, with the model Natalie Roser on its cover.

== FHM 100 Sexiest Women in the World ==
Each of FHM's international editions publish yearly rankings for the sexiest women alive based on public and editorial voting through the magazine's website. Dates of magazine issues, winners, ages of winners at the time of selection, and pertinent comments are listed below for the Australian edition.

Year	Choice	Age	Notes
2000	(United States) Jennifer Lopez	31	
2010	(Australia) Miranda Kerr	27	
2011	(England) Rosie Huntington	24	
