= Calendar Girl (Sophie Monk album) =

Studio album by Sophie Monk
- Released: 5 May 2003
- Length: 42:40
- Label: Warner
- Producers: David Caplice; Matt Medcraf

Singles from Calendar Girl
- 1. "Inside Outside" Released: 28 October 2002; 2. "Get the Music On" Released: 31 March 2003; 3. "One Breath Away" Released: 21 July 2003

Calendar Girl is the debut solo studio album by Australian recording artist Sophie Monk, released on 5 May 2003 by Warner Music. It debuted at No. 35 on the ARIA Albums Chart top 50. The album was mixed with contemporary pop as well as the religious classics tracks "Pie Jesu", "Ave Maria" (Interlude) and "Ave Maria".

The song "Come My Way" was also recorded by Japanese pop star Namie Amuro (her version was titled "Come") in Japanese and was featured in the anime InuYasha. It was released first as a single on 14 October 2003 and on the album Style on 10 December of the same year.

== Track listing ==
No.	Title	Writer(s)	Producer(s)	Length
1.	"Pie Jesu"	Michael Felix Darcy	Darcy	0:52
2.	"Come My Way"	Peter Cunnah, Jan Kask, Peter Mansson	Chili Hi Fly	4:34
3.	"Get the Music On"	Nigal Butler, Ray Hedges, John Pickering	Hedges	3:43
4.	"Don't Push It"	Rob Davis, Martin Harrington, Ash Howes	Davis	3:51
5.	"Love Thing"	Pelle Ankarberg, Niclas Molinder, Joacim Persson	Rockmelons	3:58
6.	"Anywhere with You"	Matthew Gerrard, Chris Ward	Bryon Jones	3:52
7.	"Ave Maria" (Interlude)	Darcy, Sophie Monk	Darcy	1:17
8.	"Inside Outside"	Davis, Steve Mac	Davis, Mac	4:08
9.	"Step Back to Love"	Ankarberg, Molinder, Persson, Terry Ronald	Rockmelons	3:06
10.	"Luv Me"	Monk, Steve Monopoli, Robert Parde	Shane Monopoli	3:21
11.	"You Better Not Fall"	Mark Holden, Monk	Chili Hi Fly	2:54
12.	"One Breath Away"	Paul Barry, Mark Taylor, Steve Torch	Gary Miller	3:44
13.	"Ave Maria"	Darcy, Monk	Darcy	2:44

== Charts ==
Chart (2003)	Peak position
Australian Albums (ARIA)	35

== Release history ==
Region	Date	Label	Format	Catalogue
Australia	5 May 2003	Warner Music	CD	2564603082
