= Love Will Find a Way (Bardot song) =

Single by Bardot

from the album Play It Like That
- B-side: "Hit 'N' Run"
- Released: 18 February 2002
- Recorded: 2001
- Genre: Pop
- Length: 3:16 (album version)
- Label: Warner Music Australia
- Songwriters: Ollie Jacobs; Phillip Jacobs; Patrick McMahon; Miki More
- Producer: Ollie Jacobs

Bardot singles chronology
"I Need Somebody" (2001)	"Love Will Find a Way" (2002)

Audio video
- "Love Will Find a Way" on YouTube

"Love Will Find a Way" is a song by Australian pop group Bardot and the third single from their second studio album, Play It Like That (2001). It was written by Ollie Jacobs, Phillip Jacobs, Patrick McMahon, Miki More, and produced by Ollie Jacobs.

"Love Will Find a Way" is a mid-tempo pop song with elements of acoustic and country music. It would become Bardot's final single before the group disbanded in April 2002.

== Commercial performance ==
"Love Will Find a Way" debuted at number 27 on the Australian singles chart. It would eventually peak at number 18, making it Bardot's sixth consecutive top twenty single. It spent a total of 12 weeks in the top 100.

== Track listing ==
Australian CD single (0927445412)

1. "Love Will Find a Way"
2. "Hit 'N' Run"
3. "Love Will Find a Way" (Supafly remix)
4. "Love Will Find a Way" (acoustic version)

== Charts ==
Chart (2002)	Peak Position
Australia (ARIA)	18
