= Bardot (album) =

Studio album by Bardot
- Released: 1 May 2000
- Recorded: 1999–2000
- Genre: Pop
- Length: 45:45
- Label: Warner
- Producers: Michael Szumowski; Paul Gray; Tommy Faragher; Ashley Cadell; The Rockmelons

Bardot chronology
Bardot (2000)	Play It Like That (2001)

Singles from Bardot
- 1. "Poison" Released: 17 April 2000; 2. "I Should've Never Let You Go" Released: 29 May 2000; 3. "These Days" Released: 28 August 2000

Bardot (/bɑːrˈdoʊ/ bar-DOH) is the debut studio album by Australian pop group Bardot, released by Warner Music Australia on May 1 2000.

Backed by the highly successful Popstars program on which Bardot were formed, the album was an instant success, debuting at number 1 on the Australian and the New Zealand album charts. It produced the number 1 single "Poison" and top 20 singles "I Should've Never Let You Go" and "These Days".

== Background and release ==
Bardot was recorded in late 1999 and early 2000 while a newly formed girl group – which would later be named Bardot – were being filmed for Popstars, a reality television program. Original member Chantelle Barry recorded vocals for the album, but following her sudden departure from the group, new member Tiffani Wood re-recorded Barry's parts. The album is composed of 12 pop songs, with influences from a diverse range of genres including R&B, motown, gospel, country and latin pop. Following Katie Underwood's departure in mid-2001, the album was released in the United Kingdom with an altered track listing. A new song, "ASAP", which would become the first single from Bardot's second studio album, was included on this version.

"Higher Than Heaven" had previously been recorded and released by former member of the British group Eternal, Kelle Bryan. "Higher Than Heaven" peaked at No.14 in September 1999 on the UK's Official Top 40.

In January 2021, Bardot was released on vinyl for the very first time, along with their second album Play It Like That, to mark the group's 20 year anniversary.

== Commercial performance ==
The album debuted at number one on the Australian ARIA Charts, making Bardot the first Australian act to have their debut single and debut album enter the charts at number one. The album was certified double platinum (140,000+) and became the twentieth biggest selling album in Australia of 2000. The album also sold well internationally, reaching number one in New Zealand, with a platinum certification, and peaked at #2 in Singapore where it was twelfth highest selling album of 2000. It was nominated in the Highest Selling Album category at the 2000 ARIA Music Awards but lost to Savage Garden's Affirmation.

Bardot would remain the last debut album by any girl group for six years to top the New Zealand's album charts until the Pussycat Dolls did so in June 2006 with their 2005 debut album, PCD.

== Track listing ==
Standard edition
No.	Title	Writer(s)	Producer(s)	Length
1.	"These Days"	Colin Campsie; Phil Thornalley	Tommy Faragher	3:40
2.	"I Should've Never Let You Go"	Faragher; Lotti Golden; Hinda Hicks	Faragher	4:27
3.	"Higher Than Heaven"	Alan Glass; Laura Pallas; Jodie Wilson	Faragher	3:40
4.	"Poison"	Michael Szumowski; Darryl Sims	Szumowski	3:20
5.	"Missin' Your Love"	Darren Dowlut; Dennis Dowlut	Szumowski	3:34
6.	"Down"	Nick Howard	Faragher	3:41
7.	"Other Side of Love"	Eliot Kennedy	Faragher; Paul Grey	4:14
8.	"What Have You Done"	Kennedy	Faragher	3:40
9.	"Love Me No More"	Dowlut; Dowlut	Rockmelons	4:09
10.	"Girls Do, Boys Don't"	Dow Brain; Kara DioGuardi; Brad Young	Faragher	3:26
11.	"Holding On"	Ashley Cadell	Faragher; Cadell	4:40
12.	"Got Me Where You Want Me"	Lindy Robbins; Kevin Savigar	Szumowski	3:32
Total length:				45:45

Singapore limited edition bonus disc
No.	Title	Writer(s)	Producer(s)	Length
1.	"Poison" (music video)	Szumowski; Sims	Szumowski	3:20
2.	"I Should've Never Let You Go" (music video)	Faragher; Golden; Hicks	Faragher	4:27
3.	"These Days" (music video)	Campsie; Thornalley	Faragher	3:40
4.	"Empty Room"	Elizabeth Scott	Szumowski	3:37
5.	"Do It For Love"	Paul Gray; Richard Feldman	Gray	4:11
Total length:				18:35

UK edition
No.	Title	Writer(s)	Producer(s)	Length
1.	"ASAP"	Fredrik Ödesjö; Henrik Jonback; John McLaughlin	Ödesjö	3:43
2.	"These Days"	Campsie; Thornalley	Faragher	3:40
3.	"Higher Than Heaven*"	Glass; Pallas; Wilson	Faragher	3:40
4.	"Poison"	Szumowski; Sims	Szumowski	3:20
5.	"Missin' Your Love"	Dowlut; Dowlut	Szumowski	3:34
6.	"Down"	Howard	Faragher	3:41
7.	"What Have You Done"	Kennedy	Faragher	3:40
8.	"Love Me No More"	Dowlut; Dowlut	Rockmelons	4:09
9.	"Girls Do, Boys Don't"	Brain; DioGuardi; Young	Faragher	3:26
10.	"Holding On"	Cadell	Faragher; Cadell	4:40
11.	"Got Me Where You Want Me"	Robbins; Savigar	Szumowski	3:32
13.	"Empty Room"	Scott	Szumowski	3:37
14.	"I Should've Never Let You Go" (Allstars remix)	Faragher; Golden; Hicks	Faragher	5:21
Total length:				43:32

== Charts ==
=== Weekly charts ===
Chart (2000)	Peak position
Australian Albums (ARIA)	1
New Zealand Albums (RMNZ)	1
Singapore Albums (SPVA)	2

=== Year-end charts ===
Chart (2000)	Peak position
Australia (ARIA)	20
Australian Artist (ARIA)	8
Singapore (SPVA)	12

== Certifications ==
Region	Certification	Certified units/sales
Australia (ARIA)	2× Platinum	140,000^{^}
New Zealand (RMNZ)	Platinum	15,000^{^}
Singapore (RIAS)	Platinum	15,000
^{^} Shipments figures based on certification alone.

== See also ==
- List of number-one albums of 2000 (Australia)
- List of number-one albums from the 2000s (New Zealand)
