= What's a Girl to Do? =

2000 single by Sister2Sister

- Australian cover

Single by Sister2Sister

from the album One
- B-side: "Falling for You"
- Released: 28 February 2000
- Length: 3:26 (album version) 3:05 (radio edit)
- Label: Standard; Mushroom
- Songwriter(s): Reswick; Werfel; Muscat; Rosser; Muscat

Sister2Sister singles chronology
"Sister" (1999)	"What's a Girl to Do?" (2000)	"Too Many Times" (2000)

Alternative covers
- UK CD1

Alternative cover
- UK CD2

"What's a Girl to Do?" is a song by Australian pop music duo Sister2Sister, released in February 2000 as the second single from their debut album One. The song reached number five in Australia, number 25 in New Zealand, and number 61 in the United Kingdom. It is featured in the 2000 teen film Bring It On.

== Chart performance ==
In Australia, the single debuted at number 10, staying there for two weeks before falling to number 11. It then climbed to its peak of number five and stayed there for two weeks before falling out of and rising back into the top 50. It spent a total of 20 weeks (like its predecessor) in the top 50.

In New Zealand the single debuted at number 40 before falling to number 44, then peaking at number 25 and falling out the next week. It then re-entered two weeks later at number 30, then fell out for the last time, bringing its top 50-week total to four.

In the United Kingdom, the single debuted at number 61, and fell out of the chart the following week.

== Track listings ==
Australian CD single

1. "What's a Girl to Do?"
2. "What's a Girl to Do?" (Urban Mix)
3. "Sister" (Urban Mix)
4. "Sister" (Tuff Twins Mix)
5. "Falling for You"

UK CD1

1. "What's a Girl to Do?"
2. "What's a Girl to Do?" (Allmighty Remix radio edit)
3. "Falling for You"
4. "What's a Girl to Do?" (Miami video)

UK CD2

1. "What's a Girl to Do?"
2. "What's a Girl to Do?" (John 00 Fleming Remix)
3. "What's a Girl to Do?" (Urban Mix)
4. "What's a Girl to Do?" (Australian video)

== Charts ==
=== Weekly charts ===
Chart (2000)	Peak position
Australia (ARIA)	5
New Zealand (Recorded Music NZ)	25
Scotland (OCC)	58
UK Singles (OCC)	61
UK Indie (OCC)	11

=== Year-end charts ===
Chart (2000)	Position
Australia (ARIA)	62

== Certifications ==
Region	Certification	Certified units/sales
Australia (ARIA)	Gold	35,000^{^}
^{^} Shipments figures based on certification alone.

== Release history ==
Region	Date	Format(s)	Label(s)	Ref.
Australia	28 February 2000	CD	Standard	
New Zealand	22 May 2000	CD; cassette	Standard	
United Kingdom	16 October 2000	CD; cassette	Mushroom	
