= Bloke (song) =

2000 single by Chris Franklin

Single by Chris Franklin
- B-side: "Jack Off Australia"
- Released: 2000
- Studio: Espy Records (St Kilda, Victoria)
- Length: 3:50
- Label: EMI
- Composers: Meredith Brooks; Shelly Peiken
- Lyricist: Chris Franklin
- Producers: Chris Franklin; Gavin Charles; James "Oyster" Kilpatrick

Chris Franklin singles chronology
"Bloke" (2000)	"Mullet Head" (2000)

"Bloke" is a song performed by Australian comedian Chris Franklin, released as a parody of Meredith Brooks's song "Bitch" with the lyrics changed to reflect the stereotypical Australian male lifestyle. It debuted at number 15 on the Australian Singles Chart before eventually reaching the number-one spot and staying there for two weeks, becoming the 12th-highest-selling single of the year 2000. It received a platinum certification from the Australian Recording Industry Association for shipments of over 70,000. The song was later nominated for Best Comedy Release and Highest Selling Single at the ARIA Awards.

== Awards and nominations ==
Awards and nominations for "Bloke"
Year	Award	Category	Result	Ref.
2000	ARIA Music Awards of 2000	Highest Selling Single	Nominated	
2000	ARIA Music Awards of 2000	Best Comedy Release	Nominated	

== Credits and personnel ==
Credits are lifted from the Australian CD single liner notes.

Studio

- Recorded at Espy Records (St Kilda, Victoria)

Personnel

- Chris Franklin – vocals, lyrics, production
- Meredith Brooks – music ("Bitch")
- Shelly Peiken – music ("Bitch")
- Gavin Charles – programming, arrangement, production
- James Lomas – guitar, vocals
- Fiona Lee – bass, vocals
- Crib Point Football Club 2nd 18 Choir – additional backing vocals
- James "Oysters" Kilpatrick – engineering, production
- Rod Stead – cover artwork
- Gavin Hansford – photography

== Charts ==
=== Weekly charts ===
Weekly chart performance for "Bloke"
Chart (2000)	Peak position
Australia (ARIA)	1

=== Year-end charts ===
Year-end chart performance for "Bloke"
Chart (2000)	Position
Australia (ARIA)	12

== Certifications ==
Certifications and sales for "Bloke"
Region	Certification	Certified units/sales
Australia (ARIA)	Platinum	70,000^{^}
^{^} Shipments figures based on certification alone.
