= Sister2Sister =

Australian music duo

Sister 2 Sister
- Also known as: S2S
- Origin: Sydney, New South Wales, Australia
- Genres: Pop
- Years active: 1999–2004: 2022–present
- Labels: Festival Mushroom
- Past members: Christine Muscat; Sharon Muscat
- Website: sister2sister.com.au

Sister2Sister or S2S are an Australian music duo comprising the Muscat sisters, Christine and Sharon, who are pop singers, songwriters and television presenters. Their debut album, One (June 2000), peaked at No. 3 on the ARIA Albums Chart. It provided two top five singles, "Sister" (1999) and "What's a Girl to Do?" (2000). At the ARIA Music Awards of 2000 "Sister" won Best Independent Release. From 2001 they undertook a career as television presenters, as VJs on MTV Hits, and subsequently opened the Sister2Sister School of Singing in 2004. The sisters have performed as backing vocalists for Australian singer Delta Goodrem on her Australian tours.

== Background ==
The Muscat sisters, Christine (born 27 February 1981) and Sharon (born 23 August 1984) the daughters of Maltese immigrants, are the duo that make up Sister2Sister. Their career started young when they grew up in the Sydney suburb of St. Clair, where they attended Holy Spirit Primary school and later Emmaus Catholic College in nearby Erskine Park.

Growing up in a musical family, it was during those early years that the two developed a love for music. However, they also had a knack for acting, which resulted in both of them television presenting and landing roles in TV commercials and soap operas.

At the ages of 9 and 13, Christine and Sharon joined Brent Street Studios to also study dancing. Soon after joining the school, the girls were invited to join the Brent St. Kids performance troupe and began singing and dancing all over Sydney. It was through this exposure that they attracted the attention of Tina Arena who saw their performance at the Variety Club Heart Awards. Arena mentioned the girls to her now former manager/husband. He later signed them to his management company and new record label in 1997.

== Musical career ==
=== 1999–2004: One ===
After relocating to Melbourne to write their first album, the name Sister2Sister was born. It was at this time Sharon also studied at the Victorian College of Arts. The duo also opened for Britney Spears for 6 dates on her Oops!... I Did It Again Tour in the US.

=== 2022–present: "Nothing’s Gonna Bring Us Down Now" and "Believer" ===
In August 2022, Sister2Sister released their first new song in 23 years, titled, "Nothing’s Gonna Bring Us Down Now". In October, Sister2Sister released "Love You".

== Discography ==
=== Albums ===
List of studio albums, with selected chart positions and certifications
Title	Album details	Peak chart positions		Certifications
Title	Album details	AUS	NZ	Certifications
One	Released: 12 June 2000; Label: Mushroom Records (0119912MSH); Format: CD, cassette	3	27	ARIA: Gold

=== Singles ===
Year	Title	Chart positions			Album
Year	Title	AUS	NZ	UK	Album
1999	"Sister"	3	14	18	One
2000	"What's a Girl to Do?"	5	25	61	One
2000	"Too Many Times"	35	—	—	One
2022	"Nothing’s Gonna Bring Us Down Now"	—	—	—	Non-album singles
2022	"Home for Christmas"	—	—	—	Non-album singles
2023	"Believer"	—	—	—	Non-album singles
2023	"Love You"	—	—	—	Non-album singles

== Awards and nominations ==
=== ARIA Music Awards ===
The ARIA Music Awards is an annual awards ceremony that recognises excellence, innovation, and achievement across all genres of Australian music. Sister2Sister won 1 award from 2 nominations.

Year	Nominee / work	Award	Result	Ref.
2000	"Sister"	Best Independent Release	Won	
2000	"Sister"	Highest Selling Single	Nominated	
