= Chris Franklin =

Australian comedian (born 1964)

- Born: Christopher Franklin; 16 September 1964 (age 62); Sydney, New South Wales, Australia
- Occupations: Comedian, sailor
- Years active: 1997–present

Christopher Franklin (born 16 September 1964) is an Australian stand-up comedian and former sailor for the Royal Australian Navy. He is most famous for performing the song "Bloke" (a bogan-style parody of Meredith Brooks' song "Bitch"), which was certified platinum, reached No. 1 on the ARIA Charts, and was the twelfth-biggest-selling single in Australia in 2000. He lives in Launceston, Tasmania.

== Early life ==
Franklin was born in Sydney, and he lived from age 3 to 5 on Manus Island in Papua New Guinea. As a young adult, he spent eight years in the Royal Australian Navy as a chef, and he was one of seven chosen to cook for Queen Elizabeth II during her visit to Australia in the 1980s. After this, Franklin quit the navy to take ten years off to travel Australia.

== Entertainment career ==
=== Comedy career ===
Franklin has been performing comedy since October 1997. His accomplishments include:

- PBS Radio Golden Stom Award for Best Up & Coming Comedian
- National Triple J Raw Comedy winner for Best New Comedian
- Grand Finalist National Green Faces competition in Canberra
- Third prize — The Comedy Hotel Sydney's "Night of Nights"

Franklin has performed with numerous musicians and comedians, including Jimeoin, Steady Eddy, Garry Who, Carl Barron, Richard Stubbs, Elliot Goblet, Raymond J Bartholomew, Marty Fields, The Empty Pockets, John Robertson, Peter Rowsthorn, Bob Franklin, Stevie Starr, and Mr Methane.

During 2001, Franklin toured extensively with Steady Eddy in their live show Guess Who's Pissed. Franklin has also toured with The Radiators across Australia.

In 2006, a DVD was released called Let Bogans Be Bogans; it contains Chris Franklin's stand-up routine and video clips of his parody songs.

In 2026, whilst onboard a boat with an OnlyFans model, Franklin drank VB cans and beat fellow comedians in arm wrestling

=== Music ===
Franklin's first CD single, "Bloke", a parody of Meredith Brooks' song "Bitch", was released on 31 January 2000 through EMI Music Australia. The song reached number fifteen on the charts in its first week in and subsequently achieved number-one and platinum status with more than 120,000 sales. "Bloke" was the third-highest-selling single by an Australian artist of that year. The song was nominated in two categories at the ARIA Music Awards of 2000; namely, "Best Comedy Release" and "Highest Selling Single".

Franklin released a second single entitled "Mullet Head", a parody of the hit single "Gimme Head" by The Radiators, who perform live on the single. "Mullet Head" was nominated for "Best Comedy Release" at the ARIA Music Awards of 2001.

In 2006, Franklin contributed the song "Here Come the Socceroos" as the B-side to the Freedom of Thought single "Green and Gold (Song for the Socceroos)", which peaked at number 26 on the ARIA charts.

On 7 April 2020, Franklin released the single "Stay the F*** at Home" with supergroup "Chris Franklin & The Isolators" in collaboration with various Australian music artists in response to the Coronavirus pandemic.

=== Albums ===
List of compilation albums, with selected details
Title	Album details
You Wouldn't Want Me Any Other Way	Released: April 2020; Label: A-List Entertainment; Format: Digital

=== Singles ===
List of singles, with selected chart positions
Title	Year	Peak chart positions	Certifications	Album
Title	Year	AUS	Certifications	Album
"Bloke"	2000	1	ARIA: Platinum	You Wouldn't Want Me Any Other Way
"Mullet Head"	2000	—		You Wouldn't Want Me Any Other Way
"Stay the Fuck at Home"	2020	—		You Wouldn't Want Me Any Other Way

=== Television ===
Franklin has also appeared on television, including:

- Hit & Run (Comedy Channel)
- Good News Week
- Live and Kicking (Channel 7 Melb)
- Recovery
- ABC Raw Comedy Special
- Channel 31 (Melb)
- Pizza (Fat Pizza) (SBS)
- Housos (SBS)
- The Footy Show (NRL) (Nine Network)
- The Footy Show (AFL) (Nine Network)
- Headliners (Foxtel)
- Bogan Hunters (7mate)

=== Radio ===
Franklin is a regular guest on Zinc 100.7's Rockshow with Wildy.

== Awards and nominations ==
=== ARIA Music Awards ===
The ARIA Music Awards is an annual awards ceremony that recognises excellence, innovation, and achievement across all genres of Australian music. They commenced in 1987.

Year	Nominee / work	Award	Result	Ref.
2000	"Bloke"	Highest Selling Single	Nominated	
2000	"Bloke"	Best Comedy Release	Nominated	
2001	"Mullet Head"	Best Comedy Release	Nominated	
