= Inside Outside (Sophie Monk song) =

2002 single by Sophie Monk

Single by Sophie Monk

from the album Calendar Girl
- B-side: "Luv Me"
- Released: 28 October 2002
- Studio: Sterling (New York City)
- Length: 4:10
- Label: WEA
- Songwriters: Steve Mac; Rob Davis
- Producers: Steve Mac; Rob Davis

Sophie Monk singles chronology
"Inside Outside" (2002)	"Get the Music On" (2003)

Music video
- "Inside Outside" on YouTube

"Inside Outside" is a song by Australian singer Sophie Monk. It was the first single released from her debut album, Calendar Girl (2003), on 28 October 2002. It was written and produced by Steve Mac and Rob Davis. The single debuted and peaked at number five on the Australian ARIA Singles Chart and was certified gold by the Australian Recording Industry Association (ARIA) for selling over 35,000 units. The music video features Monk in a number of different settings, including Las Vegas, Hollywood, Paris, and Hawaii.

== Charts ==
=== Weekly charts ===
Chart (2002)	Peak position
Australia (ARIA)	5

=== Year-end charts ===
Chart (2002)	Position
Australia (ARIA)	84
Australian Artists (ARIA)	18

== Certifications ==
Region	Certification	Certified units/sales
Australia (ARIA)	Gold	35,000^{^}
^{^} Shipments figures based on certification alone.
