= I Should've Never Let You Go =

2000 single by Bardot

Single by Bardot

from the album Bardot
- B-side: "Do It for Love"
- Released: 29 May 2000
- Recorded: 2000
- Studio: Tiger Recording
- Length: 4:27
- Label: WEA
- Songwriters: Tommy Faragher; Lotti Golden; Hinda Hicks
- Producer: Tommy Faragher

Bardot singles chronology
"Poison" (2000)	"I Should've Never Let You Go" (2000)	"These Days" (2000)

Audio video
- "I Should've Never Let You Go" on YouTube

"I Should've Never Let You Go" is a song by the Australian pop group Bardot. It was the second single from their debut album Bardot (2000). The song was written by Tommy Faragher, Lotti Golden and Hinda Hicks, and it was produced by Faragher.

== Commercial performance ==
"I Should've Never Let You Go" peaked at number 14 on the Australian ARIA Singles Chart and was certified gold. It became the 96th-highest-selling single in Australia in 2000. In New Zealand, the song reached number 25 on the RIANZ Singles Chart.

== Music video ==
An animated scene from the music video.

The part-animated music video, directed by Mark Hartley, had each Bardot member transform into cartoon superheroes.

== Track listing ==
Australian CD single

1. "I Should've Never Let You Go" (album version)
2. "Do It for Love"
3. "I Should've Never Let You Go" (Allstars remix)
4. "I Should've Never Let You Go" (Alex K extended dance mix)
5. "I Should've Never Let You Go" (mrTimothy.com remix)
6. "I Should've Never Let You Go" (TNT remix)

The enhanced CD component featured lyrics, a photo gallery, a screen saver and the "Poison" music video.

== Personnel ==
Personnel are adapted from the Australia CD single liner notes.

- Tommy Faragher – writing, production, mixing
- Lotti Golden – writing
- Hinda Hicks – writing
- Bardot – vocals
- Michael Szumowski – keyboards, programming
- David Hemming – mixing, engineering
- Danielle McWilliam – engineering assistance
- Vlado Meller – mastering
- Kathy Naunton – additional mastering
- Stephen Oxenbury – photography
- Kevin Wilkins – art direction

== Charts ==
=== Weekly charts ===
Chart (2000)	Peak position
Australia (ARIA)	14
New Zealand (Recorded Music NZ)	25

=== Year-end charts ===
Chart (2000)	Position
Australia (ARIA)	96

== Certifications ==
Region	Certification	Certified units/sales
Australia (ARIA)	Gold	35,000^{^}
^{^} Shipments figures based on certification alone.
