= I Need Somebody =

Single by Bardot

from the album Play It Like That
- B-side: "ASAP" (remix)
- Released: 22 October 2001
- Genre: Pop; dance
- Length: 3:30 (album version)
- Label: Warner Music Australia
- Songwriters: Ray Hedges; Nigel Butler; John Pickering
- Producer: Ray Hedges

Bardot singles chronology
"ASAP" (2001)	"I Need Somebody" (2001)	"Love Will Find a Way " (2002)

Audio video
- "I Need Somebody" on YouTube

"I Need Somebody" is a song by Australian pop group Bardot and the second single from their second studio album, Play It Like That (2001). It was written by Ray Hedges, Nigel Butler, and John Pickering, and produced by Hedges. It is an up-tempo dance–pop song influenced by disco music.

"I Need Somebody" peaked at number five on Australia's ARIA Singles Chart and was Bardot's first song to appear on the ARIA Dance Singles Chart, debuting at number one. It received a positive reception with one critic, who compared it to the dance–pop stylings of Kylie Minogue. The music video was filmed at a mansion in Sydney, directed by Simon Bookallil.

== Commercial performance ==
"I Need Somebody" debuted at number eight on the Australian ARIA Singles Chart, becoming their highest debut since "Poison" in 2000. It eventually peaked at number five, becoming Bardot's third top-five single. It spent a total of 14 weeks in the top 100 and was certified gold. On the ARIA Dance Singles Chart, "I Need Somebody" debuted at number one. "I Need Somebody" was the 59th-highest-selling single in Australia for 2001 and the fourth-highest-selling single by an Australian artist that year.

== Track listing ==
Australian CD single

1. "I Need Somebody" – 3:25
2. "I Need Somebody" (Superfly club mix) – 6:23
3. "I Need Somebody" (Le Marquis dub remix) – 7:00
4. "I Need Somebody" (Le Marquis remix) – 7:00
5. "ASAP" (KCB Klubbmix) – 3:36

== Charts ==
=== Weekly charts ===
Chart (2001)	Peak position
Australia (ARIA)	5
Australian Artist (ARIA)	1
Australia Dance (ARIA)	1

=== Year-end charts ===
Chart (2001)	Position
Australia (ARIA)	59
Australian Artist (ARIA)	4
Australia Dance (ARIA)	17

== Certifications ==
Region	Certification	Certified units/sales
Australia (ARIA)	Gold	35,000^{^}
^{^} Shipments figures based on certification alone.
