= These Days (Bardot song) =

2000 single by Bardot

Single by Bardot

from the album Bardot
- B-side: "Holding On" (live); "Higher than Heaven" (live)
- Released: 28 August 2000
- Recorded: 2000
- Studio: Tiger Recording (Sydney, Australia)
- Genre: Pop
- Length: 3:40
- Label: WEA
- Songwriters: Colin Campsie; Phil Thornalley
- Producer: Tommy Faragher

Bardot singles chronology
"I Should've Never Let You Go" (2000)	"These Days" (2000)	"ASAP" (2001)

Audio video
- "These Days" on YouTube

"These Days" is a song by Australian pop group Bardot, and was the third single from their debut album Bardot (2000). It was written by Colin Campsie and Phil Thornalley, and produced by Tommy Faragher. The single was released on two formats. CD 1 contains live recordings and an enhanced component including the music video, while CD 2 contains exclusively remixes.

"These Days" peaked at number 19 on the Australian singles chart and was certified gold, becoming Australia's 100th-highest-selling single of 2000. Bardot performed "These Days" at the 2000 ARIA Music Awards where they were nominated for three awards. In 2001, American pop singer Jennifer Paige released a cover of "These Days".

== Track listings ==
Australian CD1

1. "These Days"
2. "These Days" (Rockmelons radio remix)
3. "Holding On" (live at Sydney State Theatre)
4. "Higher than Heaven" (live at Sydney State Theatre)

This format includes an enhanced component featuring the "These Days" music video, photos and a screen saver.

Australian CD2

1. "These Days"
2. "These Days" (Recovery radio edit)
3. "These Days" (Groove Quantize Filta mix)
4. "These Days" (Sunshine mix)
5. "These Days" (DJ Clinton remix)

== Personnel ==
Personnel are adapted from the Australian CD1 liner notes.

- Bardot – vocals
- Bruce Reid – guitars
- Michael Szumowski – keyboards, programming
- Colin Campsie – writing
- Phil Thornalley – writing
- Tommy Faragher – production, mixing
- David Hemming – mixing, engineering
- Danielle McWilliam – engineering assistant
- Vlado Meller – mastering
- Kevin Wilkins – art direction

== Charts ==
=== Weekly charts ===
Weekly chart performance for "These Days"
Chart (2000)	Peak position
Australia (ARIA)	19

=== Year-end charts ===
Year-end chart performance for "These Days"
Chart (2000)	Position
Australia (ARIA)	100

== Certifications ==
Certifications for "These Days"
Region	Certification	Certified units/sales
Australia (ARIA)	Gold	35,000^{^}
^{^} Shipments figures based on certification alone.

== Jennifer Paige cover ==
"These Days"

Single by Jennifer Paige

from the album Positively Somewhere
- Released: 23 July 2001
- Length: 3:27
- Label: Edel; Hollywood
- Songwriters: Colin Campsie; Phil Thornalley
- Producers: Oliver Leiber; David Gamson

Jennifer Paige singles chronology
"Always You" (1999)	"These Days" (2001)	"Stranded" (2002)

"These Days" was covered in 2001 by American singer Jennifer Paige and was released as the first single from her second studio album, Positively Somewhere (2001). This version became a top-40 hit in Italy, where it reached number 31 in January 2003.

=== Track listings ===
Japanese maxi-CD single

1. "These Days"
2. "Stay the Night"
3. "You Get Through"

German maxi-CD single

1. "These Days" (US album mix)
2. "These Days" (Tommy D mix)
3. "You Get Through"

=== Charts ===
Weekly chart performance for "These Days"
Chart (2001–2003)	Peak position
Italy (FIMI)	31
US Adult Pop Airplay (Billboard)	34

=== Release history ===
Release dates and formats for "These Days"
Region	Date	Format(s)	Label(s)	Ref.
United States	23–24 July 2001	Top 40; hot AC radio	Edel; Hollywood	
Japan	27 March 2002	CD	Victor Entertainment	
