= ASAP (Bardot song) =

Single by Bardot

from the album Play It Like That
- Released: 23 July 2001
- Length: 3:43 (album version)
- Label: Warner Music Australia
- Songwriter(s): Fredrik Ödesjö; Henrik Jonback; John McLaughlin
- Producer(s): Fredrik Ödesjö

Bardot singles chronology
"These Days" (2000)	"ASAP" (2001)	"I Need Somebody" (2001)

Audio video
- "ASAP" on YouTube

"ASAP" is a song by Australian pop group Bardot and the first single from their second studio album, Play It Like That (2001). It was written by Murlyn Music producers Fredrik Ödesjö, Henrik Jonback, and John McLaughlin, and produced by Ödesjö. "ASAP" was Bardot's first release as a four-piece following Katie Underwood's departure in mid-2001. Initially Underwood recorded vocals on the track, however these vocals were later removed after she left the group.

== Commercial performance ==
"ASAP" became Bardot's second Australian top five and fourth gold-selling single.

== Track listings ==
Australian CD single

1. "ASAP" – 3:45
2. "ASAP" (Studio 347 dance radio edit) – 3:12
3. "ASAP" (Studio 347 r'n'b mix) – 3:17
4. "ASAP" (Studio 347 house mix extended) – 4:41

UK CD single

1. "ASAP" – 3:45
2. "Poison" – 3:20
3. "Do It for Love" – 4:09
4. "ASAP" (enhanced video)

== Charts ==
Chart (2001)	Peak position
Australia (ARIA)	5

== Certifications ==
Region	Certification	Certified units/sales
Australia (ARIA)	Gold	35,000^{^}
^{^} Shipments figures based on certification alone.
