= Bardot (Australian band) =

Australian female pop group

- Bardot as a four-piece in 2001. From left: Belinda Chapple, Tiffani Wood, Sally Polihronas and Sophie Monk.

Background information
- Origin: Australia
- Genres: Pop, dance, R&B
- Years active: 1999–2002, 2026–present
- Label: Warner Music Australia
- Members: Belinda Chapple; Sally Polihronas; Katie Underwood; Tiffani Wood
- Past members: Sophie Monk; Chantelle Barry

Bardot (/bɑːrˈdoʊ/ bar-DOH) is an Australian pop girl group which formed in 1999, consisting of Belinda Chapple, Sally Polihronas, Katie Underwood, Tiffani Wood, and formerly Sophie Monk. The group formed on the Australian reality television series Popstars, which attracted high ratings and significant media exposure. This resulted in the instant success of Bardot's debut single "Poison" and debut album Bardot (2000), both of which entered the Australian and New Zealand charts at number 1.

Following the departure of Underwood, Bardot released their second album Play It Like That (2001), featuring the top five Australian singles "ASAP" and "I Need Somebody", before parting ways in early 2002. In 2021, the compilation Greatest Hits was released to mark the group's 20 year anniversary and the group reunited for festival performances in 2026 as a four-piece without Monk.

== History ==
=== 1999–2000: Popstars and debut album success ===
Bardot formed on the Seven Network's first series of Popstars, a talent reality television show which sought to produce a five-piece girl group. The Australian series was only second to the New Zealand version which produced the group True Bliss. The act would be sponsored by the Austereo radio network, New Idea magazine and signed to Warner Music. In 1999, over 2,500 hopefuls turned up to auditions around the country, judged by radio presenter Jackie O, music executive Chris Moss, and Grant Thomas Management manager Michael Napthali, who would manage the group's career.

Bardot's original line-up, including Barry (far left).

After numerous elimination rounds, Chantelle Barry, Belinda Chapple, Sophie Monk, Sally Polihronas and Katie Underwood were selected. Shortly after the group's formation, controversy occurred when Barry departed the group with no explanation. During interviews years later, Barry clarified that she was forced to leave after taking Monk's weekly $100 money allowance, and forgetting to give it back to her. Polihronas would later state she felt Barry was "exploited" by the show and made out to be "the villain". Following her departure, judges selected Newcastle singer Tiffani Wood as the fifth member and the name "Bardot" was chosen in tribute of French actress Brigitte Bardot. Popstars began airing in February 2000 and followed Bardot during its recording sessions, photo and music video shoots, promotional activities and first live concert at the Sydney State Theatre. Considered a unique and fresh format at the time, it attracted on average more than 2.6 million viewers per episode, making it one of Australia's most successful, highest-rating programs of 2000. The series was nominated for "Most Popular Reality Program" at the 2001 Logie Awards. The success of Popstars led to widespread national media coverage and the group's instore signings attracted thousands of fans, translating into instant record sales success.

"Poison" (2000)
The first single from Bardot.

Bardot's debut single "Poison" entered the Australian singles chart at number 1, selling over 60,000 copies in its first week. It gained double platinum status, remaining in the top spot for two consecutive weeks. Their self-titled debut album also entered the charts at number 1, with Bardot setting a record by becoming the first Australian act to debut at number 1 with both its debut single and debut album. The album would go on to sell over double platinum copies and was the 20th highest selling album in Australia for 2000. Bardot repeated the same results with its debut single and album in New Zealand, where "Poison" spent three consecutive weeks at number 1.

Second single "I Should've Never Let You Go" peaked at number 14 in Australia. During this time, Bardot made a promotional trip to Singapore and other parts of south-east Asia, where the group had attracted a large fanbase. The album reached number 2 in Singapore while "I Should've Never Let You Go" reached number 1. In August 2000, Bardot embarked on its first national concert tour of Australia and released their third single "These Days", which peaked at number 19 in Australia. The group performed "These Days" at the 2000 ARIA Music Awards where they were nominated for Highest Selling Single, Highest Selling Album and Best Video.

=== 2001–2002: Departure of Underwood and Play It Like That ===
In March 2001, Bardot relocated to the United Kingdom to release "Poison" and begin work on their second album. Despite a significant promotional push including appearances on SMTV Live, Nickelodeon and Pepsi Chart, the single was only a limited success, peaking at number 45 on the UK Singles Chart. While preparing the release of "ASAP", the first single from their second album, Underwood decided to leave Bardot in pursuit of a role in the musical Hair. Ultimately the production was cancelled before it commenced due to financial pressures and shortly after, Underwood would go on to collaborate with dance act Disco Montego. "ASAP" launched Bardot as a four-piece in July 2001 and reached number 5 in Australia, becoming their fourth gold single.

"I Need Somebody" (2001)
The second single from Play It Like That.

In August 2001, Bardot performed the Village People's "Go West" at the opening ceremony of the 2001 Goodwill Games in Brisbane and in October, released the second single from their second album, "I Need Somebody". The single gained a positive reception from critics with comparisons to the dance-pop music of Kylie Minogue being made. It confirmed the group's staying power, peaking in the Australian top 5 and becoming Bardot's highest charting debut since "Poison". In November 2001, Bardot released their second album, Play It Like That, which featured co-writes by all members and received favourable reviews from critics. The album debuted at number 16 on the Australian album charts and was certified gold, but continued to drop in the weeks following, spending seven weeks in the top 100. To support the album's launch, Bardot performed at Austereo's Rumba music festivals in Melbourne and Sydney, each attended by 40,000 spectators.

In February 2002, the group released its final single, "Love Will Find a Way", which peaked at number 18. In March they embarked on their second national tour with Australian boy band Human Nature and performed at the Sydney Gay and Lesbian Mardi Gras. In April, Bardot performed at the International Indian Film Academy Awards in Malaysia, followed by a promotional tour of India.

=== 2002–2019: Break-up and post-Bardot years ===
On 16 April 2002, Bardot announced their decision to split. An official statement read the group had "...cited the need for a well earned break following what has been a phenomenal 2.5-year explosion on the Australian music scene" and that "the pace at which the group's career continued...has taken its toll." The group performed a farewell concert for Channel V and made their final appearance together for a charity event on 2 May in Sydney. The decision to break up came as a surprise to many in the industry who believed Bardot was in the process of establishing a strong and credible reputation. Rumours circulated that the split was a result of Monk's desire to begin a solo career, though she denied this. Soon after Bardot's split, Wood confirmed that at the time, both she and Chapple were the two members keen to continue as Bardot.

All members, apart from Polihronas, went on to release solo music before forging careers in different fields. Solo singles that charted in the Australian top 50 were Underwood's "Danger" (2004) and collaboration singles "Beautiful" (2002), "Magic" (2002) and "Be Together" (2006), Monk's "Inside Outside" (2002), "Get the Music On" (2003) and "One Breath Away" (2003), Wood's "What R U Waiting 4" (2004), and Chappel's "Move Together" (2005). Monk is the only member to have achieved a charting solo album with Calendar Girl (2003). In April 2004, Bardot's original management team Grant Thomas Management sued the Popstars producer Screentime and its joint venture company Five Divas, for breach of contract and loss of earnings. In November 2000, Bardot sacked Grant Thomas Management midway through a three-year contract because according to Screentime, Bardot had "lost all confidence". Grant Thomas were successfully awarded $129,561. In 2009, Wood and Underwood professionally reunited for the stage musical Valentino, based on the life of Rudolph Valentino. In 2019, after years of being commercially unavailable, both of Bardot's albums were added to streaming services.

=== 2020–present: 20th anniversary celebrations, Greatest Hits and reunion ===
In April 2020, to commemorate the 20th anniversary of their debut single "Poison", Wood, Underwood and Chapple reunited remotely online to perform the song. Barry would also release her own version of "Poison" later that year. A greatest hits album was released on vinyl in January 2021 and a further compilation containing remixes, b-sides and the previously unreleased track, "Something Worth Fighting For", was released digitally in April 2021. In June 2021, both of Bardot's studio albums were re-issued on vinyl for the first time and in July 2021, an EP of new remixes was released.

In October 2021, Underwood and Chapple professionally reunited as a duo under the name Ka'Bel, releasing their debut single "Broken Hearted". In 2023 Chapple published a memoir outlining her time in Bardot called The Girl in the Band.

On 4 February 2026, it was announced that Bardot would reunite without Monk, for a performance at the Mighty Hoopla music festival in Sydney later that month, to celebrate their 25 year anniversary. In May, they performed as part of Mighty Hoopla's London lineup.

== Lineups ==
Members	1999	2000	2001	2002	2026
Chantelle Barry (1999)					
Katie Underwood (1999–2001, 2026)					
Belinda Chapple (1999–2002, 2026)					
Sally Polihronas (1999–2002, 2026)					
Sophie Monk (1999–2002)					
Tiffani Wood (1999–2002, 2026) (Replaced Chantelle Barry)					

== Discography ==
=== Studio albums ===
List of studio albums, with selected details, chart positions and certifications
Title	Album details	Peak positions			Certifications
Title	Album details	AUS	NZ	SGP	Certifications
Bardot	Released: 1 May 2000; Label: Warner (#8573830922); Format: CD	1	1	2	ARIA: 2× Platinum; RIAS: Platinum; RMNZ: Platinum
Play It Like That	Released: 12 November 2001; Label: Warner (#0927428112); Format: CD	16	—	—	ARIA: Gold
"—" denotes releases that did not chart.

=== Compilations ===
List of compilations, with selected details and chart positions
Title	Album details	Peak positions
Title	Album details	AUS 100% Ind.
Greatest Hits	Released: 30 January 2021; Label: Point of Contact Australia (#81DBBDB0); Format: 12" vinyl, digital download, streaming	6
Remixes	Released: 23 April 2021; Label: Bardot; Format: Digital download, streaming	5

=== Extended plays ===
List of extended plays, with selected details and chart positions
Title	EP details	Peak positions	
Title	EP details	AUS 100% Ind.	AUS Ind. Label
2021 Mixes	Released: 23 July 2021; Label: Bardot; Format: Digital download, streaming	1	6

=== Singles ===
List of singles, with selected chart positions and certifications
Title	Year	Peak positions				Certifications (thresholds)	Album
Title	Year	AUS	NZL	SGP	UK	Certifications (thresholds)	Album
"Poison"	2000	1	1	4	45	ARIA: 2× Platinum; RMNZ: Platinum	Bardot
"I Should've Never Let You Go"	2000	14	29	1	—	ARIA: Gold; RIAS: Gold	Bardot
"These Days"	2000	19	—	12	—	ARIA: Gold	Bardot
"ASAP"	2001	5	—	—	—	ARIA: Gold	Play It Like That
"I Need Somebody"	2001	5	—	—	—	ARIA: Gold	Play It Like That
"Love Will Find a Way"	2002	18	—	—	—		Play It Like That
"—" denotes releases that did not chart.

=== Home videos ===
List of home videos, with selected details and certifications
Title	Details	Certification
Popstars: The Making of Bardot	Released: 22 May 2000; Label: Warner (#8573830083); Format: VHS	
Bardot: The Adventure Continues	Released: 7 August 2000; Label: Warner (#8573834193); Format: VHS	ARIA: Gold

=== Music videos ===
List of music videos, with year of release and director
Title	Year	Director
"Poison"	2000	Mark Hartley
"I Should've Never Let You Go"	2000	Mark Hartley
"These Days"	2000	Simon Bookallil
"ASAP"	2001	Mark Hartley
"I Need Somebody"	2001	Simon Bookallil
"Love Will Find a Way"	2002	Simon Bookallil

== Concert tours ==
List of concert tours, showing dates, associated album(s), countries and number of shows
Title	Dates	Associated album(s)	Country	Shows
Bardot Live in Concert	August 13, 2000 – August 26, 2000	Bardot	Australia	10
Tour dates: August 13 - Perth Entertainment Centre, Perth; August 15 - Adelaide Entertainment Centre, Adelaide; August 16 - Festival Hall, Melbourne; August 18 - Derwent Entertainment Centre, Hobart; August 19 - Silverdome, Launceston; August 21 - Royal Theatre, Canberra; August 22 - Wollongong Entertainment Centre, Wollongong; August 24 - Hordern Pavilion, Sydney; August 25 - Brisbane Festival Hall, Brisbane; August 26 - Newcastle Workers Club, Newcastle
The Here and Now Tour (with Human Nature)	March 2, 2002 – March 17, 2002	Play It Like That, Here & Now: The Best of Human Nature	Australia	10
Tour dates: March 2 - Royal Theatre, Canberra; March 3 - Queensland Performing Arts Centre, Brisbane; March 5 - Concert Hall, Perth; March 8 - Sydney State Theatre, Sydney; March 9 - Sydney State Theatre, Sydney; March 10 - Newcastle Civic Theatre, Newcastle; March 12 - Palais Theatre, Melbourne; March 13 - Palais Theatre, Melbourne; March 15 - Derwent Entertainment Centre, Hobart; March 17 - Victoria Park Racecourse, Adelaide

== Awards and nominations ==
=== ARIA Music Awards ===
The ARIA Music Awards is an annual awards ceremony that recognises excellence, innovation, and achievement across all genres of Australian music. Bardot were nominated for three awards.

Year	Nominee / work	Award	Result
2000	Bardot	Highest Selling Album	Nominated
2000	"Poison"	Highest Selling Single	Nominated
2000	"Poison" (Directed by Mark Hartley)	Best Video	Nominated

=== Logie Awards ===
The Logie Awards is an annual gathering to celebrate Australian television, sponsored and organised by magazine TV Week. The awards are presented in categories representing both public and industry voted awards.

Year	Nominee / work	Award	Result
2001	Popstars	Most Popular Reality Program	Nominated

Preceded by N/A	Australian Popstars winners 2000	Succeeded by Scandal'us
