= Poison (Bardot song) =

2000 song by Bardot

Single by Bardot

from the album Bardot
- B-side: "Empty Room"
- Released: 10 April 2000
- Recorded: 2000
- Studio: Tiger Recording (Sydney, Australia)
- Length: 3:20
- Label: WEA
- Songwriters: Michael Szumowski; Darryl Sims
- Producer: Michael Szumowski

Bardot singles chronology
"Poison" (2000)	"I Should've Never Let You Go" (2000)

Audio sample
- file; help

Audio video
- "Poison" on YouTube

"Poison" is a pop song by Australian female group Bardot and was the first single released from their self-titled debut album (2000). It was written by Darryl Sims and Michael Szumowski, who also produced the track. The single attracted much attention due to its inclusion on the high-rating Popstars program.

"Poison" debuted at number one on the Australian ARIA Singles Chart, where it stayed for two consecutive weeks, and was certified double platinum. It became the sixth-highest-selling single of Australia in 2000 and was nominated for Highest Selling Single at the 2000 ARIA Music Awards, losing to Madison Avenue's "Don't Call Me Baby". "Poison" was also a success in New Zealand, where it spent three consecutive weeks at number one and was certified platinum. It was released in the United Kingdom on 2 April 2001, debuting and peaking at number 45 the same month.

== Music video ==
The "Poison" music video was created during the filming of Popstars and therefore, the making of the video featured on the program. The video features the five members, each in their own distinct individual sets for the majority of the song – Tiffani is set in a hotel room, Sophie is set in a fairy garden, Sally is set in an authentic room made of bamboo, Katie is set in a futuristic, bright red room and Belinda is set in a disco room, surrounded by shining disco balls. Seconds before the final chorus, Tiffani, Sophie, Katie and Belinda slide down poles into Sally's set and spend the final chorus singing together. Director Mark Hartley received three nominations for Best Video at the ARIA Music Awards of 2000, including one for "Poison".

== Awards and nominations ==
Year	Nominee / work	Award	Result
2000	"Poison"	ARIA Award for Highest Selling Single	Nominated
2000	"Poison" (Directed by Mark Hartley)	ARIA Award for Best Video	Nominated

== Track listings ==
Australian CD single

1. "Poison"
2. "Empty Room"
3. "Poison" (S'N'T Club remix)
4. "Poison" (Treat Me Bad dub)
5. "Poison" (Full Phat remix)

UK CD single

1. "Poison" – 3:20
2. "Poison" (S'N'T Club remix) – 5:58
3. "Empty Room" – 3:33
4. "Poison" (enhanced video)

== Credits and personnel ==
Credits are adapted from the Australian CD single liner notes.

Studio

- Recorded and mixed at Tiger Recording (Sydney, Australia)

Personnel

- Darryl Sims – writing
- Michael Szumowski – writing, production, programming
- Bardot – vocals
- Bruce Reid – guitars
- Sam Dixon – bass
- Tommy Faragher – additional vocal production, mixing
- David Hemming – mixing, engineering
- Danielle McWilliam – engineering assistance
- Don Bartley – mastering
- Stephen Oxenbury – photography
- Kevin Wilkins – art direction

== Charts ==
=== Weekly charts ===
Chart (2000–2001)	Peak position
Australia (ARIA)	1
New Zealand (Recorded Music NZ)	1
Scotland Singles (OCC)	42
UK Singles (OCC)	45

=== Year-end charts ===
Chart (2000)	Position
Australia (ARIA)	6

== Certifications ==
Region	Certification	Certified units/sales
Australia (ARIA)	2× Platinum	140,000^{^}
New Zealand (RMNZ)	Platinum	10,000^{*}
^{*} Sales figures based on certification alone.^{^} Shipments figures based on certification alone.

== See also ==
- List of number-one singles of 2000 (Australia)
- List of number-one singles from the 2000s (New Zealand)
