= Now 02 (Australian series) =

Compilation album by Various Artists
- Released: 2 December 2002
- Label: EMI

Australian series chronology
Now 01 (2002)	Now 02 (2002)	Now 03 (2003)

Now 02 is a compilation CD released by EMI Music Australia and Warner Music Australia in 2002. The album is the #12 compilation of 2003. The album has also been referred to as 'The Rumba! Edition' to coincide with the Australian music festival of the same name. Two songs are featured as part of the Rumba! festival, a cover of "Good Times" by Chic performed by various performers of the Rumba! festival and a bonus live track from the Rumba! festival of the previous year.

== Track listing ==
1. Atomic Kitten – "The Tide Is High (Get the Feeling)" (3:25)
2. Disco Montego featuring Selwyn, Katie Underwood, Peta Morris and Jeremy Gregory – "Good Times (Are You Ready to Rumba!)" (3:00)
3. Kylie Minogue – "Love at First Sight" (3:55)
4. Liberty X – "Just a Little" (3:54)
5. Jennifer Love Hewitt – "BareNaked" (3:42)
6. Novaspace – "Time After Time" (4:35)
7. Craig David – "What's Your Flava?" (3:38)
8. Nick Carter – "Help Me" (3:09)
9. Sophie Monk – "Inside Outside" (4:08)
10. Beenie Man featuring Janet Jackson – "Feel It Boy" (3:22)
11. Britney Spears – "Boys" (3:29)
12. Kasey Chambers – "If I Were You" (4:09)
13. Dannii Minogue – "Put the Needle on It" (3:25)
14. Taxiride – "How I Got This Way" (3:30)
15. Danielle – "Tell Me If You Like It" (3:29)
16. Blue – "One Love" (3:28)
17. N.E.R.D – "Rock Star" (4:19)
18. Disco Montego featuring Katie Underwood – "Magic" (3:51)
19. Bec Cartwright – "All Seats Taken" (3:31)
20. Craig David – "7 Days" (Bonus Live Track from Rumba 2001) (3:00)
