= Serious Fun: Tales of the Rockmelons =

Serious Fun: Tales of the Rockmelons (1985–2002)

Box set by Rockmelons
- Released: 13 November 2015
- Recorded: 1985–2002
- Genres: Rock, pop, funk
- Label: The Rockmelons

Rockmelons chronology
Rockies 3 (2002)	Serious Fun: Tales of the Rockmelons (1985–2002) (2015)

Serious Fun: Tales of the Rockmelons (1985–2002) is a four-disc box set by Australian rock-pop band, Rockmelons, released in Australia in November 2015. The box set contains the band's three original studio albums, all remastered, restored and repackaged as well as a bonus disc rarities and remixes. The package contains extensive liner notes from esteemed journalist Toby Creswell.

== Background and release ==
The Rockmelons forged funk, soul, and hip-hop into a musical mix that helped change the traditional Australian rock scene during the late '80s and early '90s. Founder Ray Medhurst recruited brothers Jonathon "Jonno" Jones and Byron Jones, and with keyboardist Vinnie Dale and three vocalists—Peter Blakeley, John Kenny and Sandi Chick—the fledgling band would perform at their own dance parties in warehouses around Sydney. Guest performers often swelled the band to ten or more members on stage at any one time. The Rockmelons' debut single, "Time Out (for Serious Fun)", featured Sandi Chick on lead vocals and was issued through the independent label Phantom in 1985. The Rockmelons released three successful studio albums pushing the boundaries of early dance in Sydney in the mid eighties. The band won an ARIA Award in 1989.

== Review ==
Professional ratings
Review scores
Source	Rating
Sydney Morning Herald	3.5/5 stars

Bernard Zuel from Sydney Morning Herald gave the album 3 1/2 out of 5, saying "The brainchild of brothers Byron and Jonno Jones and Ray Medhurst, Rockmelons had a run of good, sometimes excellent and, at least once, brilliant songs in multiple genres. Spread across four discs are '70s R&B, German electro, Stock Aitken Waterman pop, reggae, soul, Italian house and hip hop. The production improved over time, the personnel shifted and the songwriting got more sophisticated but at its core remained these fans of dance music and pop with an eye for visuals and an even better ear for guest vocalists: in the power and depth of Sandi Chick and the Marvin Gaye lightness of Peter Blakely in particular they had superior voices. There's a lot to dig into here: disc 3 may be the least satisfying, but it all works even if you never did bust an embarrassing move to "Sweat It Out" back in the day."

== Track listing ==
CD 1 Tales of the City, (1988)

1. "New Groove" – 4:39
2. "What's It Gonna Be?" – 4:46
3. "Jump" – 2:31
4. "Thief" – 3:21
5. "Dreams in the Empty City" – 3:45
6. "Get Back on the Groove" – 4:56
7. "Rhymes" – 4:43
8. "Boogietron" – 4:22
9. "Money Talks" – 3:59

CD 2 Form 1 Planet, (1992)

1. "That Word (L.O.V.E.)" – 4:10
2. "Stronger Together" – 4:45
3. "Form One Planet" – 4:13
4. "It's Not Over" – 6:28
5. "Love's Gonna Bring You Home" – 5:56
6. "Rain" – 4:08
7. "More Tales of the City" – 4:35
8. "Dance Floor" – 4:19
9. "Ain't No Sunshine" – 3:17
10. "Bubble and Squeak" – 3:54

CD 3 Rockies 3, (2002)

1. "All I Want Is You" – 3:56
2. "I Ain't Playin'" – 3:48
3. "Only Love Will Take Us There" – 5:04
4. "One Good Reason" – 4:52
5. "Find My Way Home" – 5:57
6. "I Got News For You" – 4:15
7. "Game Tight" – 4:06
8. "Another Beautiful Day" – 5:00
9. "C'est L'amour (Love Is Still The Message)" – 6:59
10. "Three's a Crowd" – 3:36
11. "Interplanetary" – 5:20
12. "How Could You Say It?" – 3:59
13. "All I Want Is You" (Funk Corporation Club Mix) – 7:33
14. "I Ain't Playin'" (Funk Corporation vs. Aviators Club Mix) – 8:38

CD 4 Rare and Remixes

1. "Time Out (For Serious Fun)"
2. "Sweat It Out"
3. "Hypnoteque"
4. "Crunchy"
5. "BoogieTron" (Rob Racic Freaky Mix)
6. "That Word L.O.V.E" (Eric Kupper NY Radio Mix)
7. "It's Not Over"
8. "Stronger Together" (Eric Kupper Mix)
9. "Love's Gonna Bring You Home" (Love To Infinity Classic Paradise Mix)
10. "If Tomorrow Ever Comes" (Quieres Monkear Part 1)

== Release history ==
Region	Date	Format	Edition(s)	Label	Catalogue
Australia	13 November 2015	CD; digital download	Standard	The Rockmelons	5083907
