= Dance, Dance, Dance: The Best of Chic =

Greatest hits album by Chic
- Released: October 29, 1991
- Recorded: 1977–1982
- Genre: Disco, funk, R&B
- Length: 71:35
- Label: Atlantic
- Producer: Nile Rodgers, Bernard Edwards

Professional ratings
Review scores
| Source | Rating |
|---|---|
| Allmusic | 4.5/5 stars |

Dance, Dance, Dance: The Best of Chic is a greatest hits album of recordings by American R&B band Chic, released by Atlantic Records/Warner Music in 1991. The compilation covers the hits and best-known album tracks from the band's early career, 1977–1979, with the addition of 1982 track "Soup for One". (Note: the version used is the edited 7" version, the cover incorrectly lists the timing of the 12" mix.)

== Track listing ==
All tracks written by Bernard Edwards and Nile Rodgers unless otherwise noted.

1. "Dance, Dance, Dance (Yowsah, Yowsah, Yowsah)" (Edwards, Rodgers, Lehman) - 8:23
  - From 1977 album Chic
2. "Everybody Dance" (12" Mix) - 8:25
  - Original version appears on 1977 album Chic
3. "Strike Up the Band" (Edwards, Lehman, Rodgers) - 4:33
  - From 1977 album Chic
4. "Chic Cheer" - 4:42
  - From 1978 album C'est Chic
5. "Le Freak" – 5:31
  - From 1978 album C'est Chic
6. "I Want Your Love" - 6:55
  - From 1978 album C'est Chic
7. "Good Times" - 8:13
  - From 1979 album Risqué
8. "My Feet Keep Dancing" - 6:46
  - From 1979 album Risqué
9. "My Forbidden Lover" - 4:42
  - From 1979 album Risqué
10. "Soup for One" (NB: 7" Edit. Listed as - 7:58, the timing of the 12" mix) - 3:07
  - Original version appears on 1982 soundtrack album Soup For One
11. "Savoir Faire" - 5:01
  - From 1978 album C'est Chic

== Production ==
- Bernard Edwards - producer for Chic Organization Ltd.
- Nile Rodgers - producer for Chic Organization Ltd.
- Kenny Lehman - co-producer (tracks 1 & 3)

== Certifications ==
Certifications for Dance, Dance, Dance: The Best of Chic
| Region | Certification | Certified units/sales |
|---|---|---|
| United Kingdom (BPI) | Silver | 60,000^{‡} |
^{‡} Sales+streaming figures based on certification alone.
