= APRA Music Awards of 2003 =

Annual Australian music awards

- Date: 19 May 2003
- Location: Australia

The Australasian Performing Right Association Awards of 2003 (generally known as APRA Awards) are a series of awards which include the APRA Music Awards, Classical Music Awards, and Screen Music Awards. The APRA Music Awards were presented by APRA and the Australasian Mechanical Copyright Owners Society (AMCOS). The Classical Music Awards were distributed in July in Sydney and are sponsored by APRA and the Australian Music Centre (AMC). The Screen Music Awards were issued in November by APRA and Australian Guild of Screen Composers (AGSC).

== Awards ==
Nominees and winners with results indicated on the right.

=== APRA Music Awards ===
Song of the Year
Title	Artist	Writer	Result
"Not Pretty Enough"	Kasey Chambers	Kasey Chambers	Won
"The Greatest View"	Silverchair	Daniel Johns	Nominated
"Without You"	Silverchair	Daniel Johns	Nominated
"London Still"	The Waifs	Donna Simpson, Vikki Simpson, Joshua Cunningham	Nominated
"Chemical Heart"	Grinspoon	Patrick Davern, Phil Jamieson	Nominated
Songwriters of the Year
Writer			Result
Daniel Johns			Won
Breakthrough Songwriter
Writer			Result
Craig Nicholls			Won
Ted Albert Award for Outstanding Services to Australian Music
Name			Result
Angus Young, Malcolm Young and (posthumously) Bon Scott			Won
Most Performed Australian Work
Title	Artist	Writer	Result
"Beautiful"	Disco Montego featuring Katie Underwood	Katie Underwood, Darren Dowlut, Dennis Dowlut	Nominated
"Creepin' Up Slowly"	Taxiride	Dow Brain, Bradley Young, Jason Singh, Timothy Watson, Tim Wild	Nominated
"The Greatest View"	Silverchair	Daniel Johns	Nominated
"Insatiable"	Darren Hayes	Darren Hayes, Walter Afanasieff	Nominated
"Not Pretty Enough"	Kasey Chambers	Kasey Chambers	Won
Most Performed Australian Work Overseas
Title	Artist	Writer	Result
"I Knew I Loved You"	Savage Garden	Daniel Jones, Darren Hayes	Won
Most Performed Country Work
Title	Artist	Writer	Result
"If I Were You"	Kasey Chambers	Kasey Chambers	Nominated
"A Million Tears"	Kasey Chambers	Kasey Chambers	Nominated
"Not Pretty Enough"	Kasey Chambers	Kasey Chambers	Won
"Never Never"	Brendon Walmsley	Brendon Walmsley	Nominated
"New England Highway"	Adam Brand	Adam Bruno, Michael Carr	Nominated
Most Performed Dance Work
Title	Artist	Writer	Result
"All I Want Is You"	Rockmelons	Bryon Jones, Jonathan Jones, Raymond Medhurst, Daniel Dharumasena, Andrew De Silva, Paul Cecchinelli	Nominated
"Beautiful"	Disco Montego featuring Katie Underwood	Katie Underwood, Darren Dowlut, Dennis Dowlut	Won
"Dance All Night"	B. J. Caruana	Ashley Cadell, Rebecca Caruana	Nominated
"Give In to Me"	Rogue Traders	Jamie Appleby, Steve Davis, Josephine Armstead, Milton Middlebrook	Nominated
"Way Love's Supposed to Be"	Selwyn	Selwyn Pretorius, Audius Mtawarira, Paul Begaud	Nominated
Most Performed Foreign Work
Title	Artist	Writer	Result
"Better Man"	Robbie Williams	Robert Williams, Guy Chambers	Nominated
"Murder on the Dancefloor"	Sophie Ellis-Bextor	Sophie Ellis-Bextor, Gregg Alexander	Nominated
"Superman (It's Not Easy)"	Five for Fighting	John Ondrasik	Won
"Thousand Miles (Interlude)"	Vanessa Carlton	Vanessa Carlton	Nominated
"Wherever You Go"	The Calling	Alex Band, Aaron Kamin	Nominated
Most Performed Jazz Work
Title	Artist	Writer	Result
"Generating"	Tim Stevens	Timothy Stevens	Nominated
"Paul Bley"	James Muller	James Muller	Nominated
"Pray (In Your Own Way)"	Steve Hunter	Steve Hunter	Nominated
"Seed of Delight"	Sandy Evans	Sandra Evans	Won
"All the Wild Wonders"	Coco's Lunch	Susan Johnson, Elizabeth Honey	Nominated
=== Classical Music Awards ===
Best Composition by an Australian Composer
Title		Composer	Result
Three Miró Pieces		Richard Meale	Won
Best Performance of an Australian Composition
Title	Composer	Performer	Result
Concerto for Oboe and Orchestra	Ross Edwards	Diana Doherty	Won
Distinguished Services to Australian Music
Artist or Organisation			Result
Robert Hughes			Won
Instrumental Work of the Year
Title	Composer	Performer	Result
Arch Window	Paul Stanhope	Marshall McGuire	Nominated
Drummers of Gilgamesh	David Pye	The Drummers of Gilgamesh	Won
Perihelion Rag	Stephen Cronin	200 Guitar Duo	Nominated
Song for Emily	Ross Edwards	200 Guitar Duo	Nominated
Long-Term Contribution to the Advancement of Australian Music
Artist or Organisation			Result
Martin Wright			Won
Orchestral Work of the Year
Title	Composer	Performer	Result
End of All Journeys	Andrew Batterham	Melbourne Symphony Orchestra	Nominated
Guyuhmgan	Georges Lentz	Sydney Symphony Orchestra	Nominated
Ngangkar	Georges Lentz	Sydney Symphony Orchestra	Nominated
Three Miró Pieces	Richard Meale	Sydney Symphony Orchestra	Won
Most Distinguished Contribution to the Presentation of Australian Composition by an Individual
Individual		Work	Result
Julian Burnside			Won
Most Distinguished Contribution to the Presentation of Australian Composition by an Organisation
Organisation		Work	Result
Sydney Symphony Orchestra – Sydney Symphony Education Program		Adult Themes (2002)	Won
Most Distinguished Contribution to the Advancement of Australian Music in Education
Organisation		Work	Result
MLC School, Burwood		Ars Musica Australis	Won
Most Distinguished Contribution to the Advancement of Australian Music in a Regional Area
Organisation		Work	Result
NORPA		Northern Rivers Performing Arts	Won
Vocal or Choral Work of the Year
Title	Composer	Performer	Result
Hear the Angels Sing	Rosalind Carlson	Carlson Chorale	Nominated
Lully Lullay	Colin Brumby	Young Voices of Melbourne	Nominated
Myoon Myoon	Stephen Leek	Young Voices of Melbourne	Nominated
The True Samaritan	Nigel Butterley	The Contemporary Singers	Won
=== Screen Music Awards ===
Best Feature Film Score
Title		Composer	Result
Black and White		Cezary Skubiszewski	Nominated
The Crocodile Hunter: Collision Course		Mark McDuff, Elliott Wheeler, Peter Kaldor	Nominated
Horse Play		Nigel Westlake	Nominated
The Nugget		Nigel Westlake	Won
Best Music for an Advertisement
Title		Composer	Result
ABC Cloth		David Chapman	Nominated
Jade		Bruce Heald, Ramesh Sathiah, Adrian Wallace	Nominated
Kahlúa – "Awaken the Spirit"		John Green	Nominated
Singapore Airlines		Bruce Heald, Ramesh Sathiah, Rai Thistlethwayte	Won
Best Music for Children's Television
Title		Composer	Result
Hi-5 - "Celebrate"		Chris Harriott, Lisa Hoppe	Nominated
The Wiggles - "Lights, Camera, Action, Wiggles!"		Murray Cook, Jeffrey Fatt, Anthony Field, John Field, Gregory Page	Nominated
Pirate Islands		Danny Beckerman, Ric Formosa	Won
Worst Best Friends		Martyn Love	Nominated
Best Music for a Documentary
Title		Composer	Result
Cave in the Snow		Felicity Fox	Nominated
Chinese Takeaway		Charlie Chan	Nominated
Horses – The Story of Equus		Roger Mason	Won
Escape from the Planet of the Tapes		Brett Collery	Nominated
Best Music for an Educational, Training or Corporate Film/Video
Title		Composer	Result
SAFC: 30th Anniversary		Ashley Klose	Won
Best Music for a Mini-Series or Telemovie
Title		Composer	Result
After the Deluge		Cezary Skubiszewski	Nominated
Evil Never Dies		Nerida Tyson-Chew	Won
Martha's New Coat		Karen Leimbach	Nominated
Seconds to Spare		Guy Gross	Nominated
Best Music for a Short Film
Title		Composer	Result
Heaven		Hylton Mowday	Nominated
Hello		Jonathan Nix	Nominated
Human Contraptions		Alan John	Won
Ward 13		Christopher Gordon	Nominated
Best Music for a Television Series or Serial
Series or Serial	Episode title	Composer	Result
Farscape	"Episode 422"	Guy Gross	Nominated
Fat Cow Motel	"Episode 3"	Cameron McKenzie	Nominated
McLeod's Daughters	"Episode 47"	Alastair Ford	Nominated
MDA	"Episode 8"	Roger Mason	Won
Best Original Song Composed for a Feature Film, Telemovie, TV Series or Mini-Series
Song title	Work	Composer	Result
"As One"	Liquid Bridge	Joe Creighton, Deborah Carter	Nominated
"Changing"	A Simple Song	Scott Cameron	Nominated
"Garage Days"	Garage Days	David McCormack, Andrew Lancaster	Nominated
"Go Forward"	Whale Rider	Lisa Gerrard	Won
Best Soundtrack Album
Title		Composer	Result
After the Deluge		Cezary Skubiszewski	Won
Paradise Found		Frank Strangio	Nominated
The Tracker		Graham Tardif, Rolf de Heer	Nominated
Whale Rider		Lisa Gerrard	Nominated
Best Television Theme
Title		Composer	Result
After the Deluge		Cezary Skubiszewski	Nominated
Enough Rope with Andrew Denton		David Chapman	Won
MDA		Roger Mason	Nominated
White Collar Blue		Antony Partos	Nominated
International Achievement Award
Artist			Result
Bruce Smeaton			Won

== See also ==
- Music of Australia
