= Les Plus Grands Succès De Chic: Chic's Greatest Hits =

Greatest hits album by Chic
- Released: December 1979
- Recorded: 1977–1979
- Genre: Disco; funk; R&B; jazz; samba
- Length: 38:44
- Label: Atlantic
- Producer: Nile Rodgers; Bernard Edwards

Chic chronology
Risqué (1979)	Les Plus Grands Succès De Chic: Chic's Greatest Hits (1979)	Real People (1980)

Professional ratings
Review scores
Source	Rating
AllMusic	4/5 stars
Christgau's Record Guide	A−

Les Plus Grands Succès De Chic: Chic's Greatest Hits, also known as The Best of Chic, is a greatest hits album by the American R&B band Chic, released on Atlantic Records in late 1979. It includes the biggest hits from their first three albums: Chic (1977), C'est Chic (1978) and Risqué (1979).

The seven-track album, which omits the 1979 hit single "My Forbidden Lover" and replaces it with "Chic Cheer" and also combines three 7-inch edits and one extended 12-inch mix with three album versions, was the only compilation to be released during the band's six years on Atlantic. It reached number 88 on the US charts and number 30 in the UK in early 1980. Non-US editions dropped "Chic Cheer" for "My Forbidden Lover". The compilation was the first time that the 12" mix of "Everybody Dance" was made generally available, having previously been issued only as a promotion.

== Track listing ==
All tracks produced and written by Bernard Edwards and Nile Rodgers, except "Dance, Dance, Dance (Yowsah, Yowsah, Yowsah)" co-written by Kenny Lehman.

Side one
No.	Title	Album	Length
1.	"Le Freak" (7" edit)	C'est Chic	3:30
2.	"I Want Your Love" (7" edit)	C'est Chic	3:28
3.	"Dance, Dance, Dance (Yowsah, Yowsah, Yowsah)" (7" edit)	Chic	3:40
4.	"Everybody Dance" (12" mix)	Chic	8:25

Side two: US Editions
No.	Title	Album	Length
1.	"Chic Cheer"	C'est Chic	4:42
2.	"Good Times" (12" mix)	Risqué	8:13
3.	"My Feet Keep Dancing"	Risqué	6:46

Side two: Non-US editions
No.	Title	Album	Length
1.	"My Forbidden Lover"	Risqué	4:42
2.	"Good Times" (12" Mix)	Risqué	8:13
3.	"My Feet Keep Dancing"	Risqué	6:46

== Personnel ==
- Alfa Anderson – lead vocals (A1, A2, B2)
- Luci Martin – lead vocals (B2, B3)
- Norma Jean Wright – lead vocals (A4)
- Bernard Edwards – lead vocals (B3), bass guitar
- Nile Rodgers – guitar, vocals
- Tony Thompson – drums
- Fonzi Thornton – vocals
- Michelle Cobbs – vocals
- Ulland McCullough – vocals
- Luther Vandross – vocals
- David Lasley – vocals
- Robin Clark – vocals
- Diva Gray – lead vocals (A1)
- Sammy Figueroa – percussion
- Robert Sabino – keyboards, clavinet, acoustic piano and electric piano
- Andy Schwartz – keyboards, clavinet, acoustic and electric piano
- Raymond Jones – keyboards
- Tom Coppola – keyboards
- Jon Faddis – trumpet
- Ellen Seeling – trumpet
- Alex Foster – saxophone
- Jean Fineberg – saxophone
- Barry Rodgers – trombone
- Kenny Lehman – woodwinds
- George Young – flute, tenor saxophone
- Vito Rendace – flute, tenor saxophone
- David Friedman – orchestral bells, vibraphones
- Jose Rossy – tubular bells
- Gloria Augustini – harp
- Marianne Carroll (The Chic Strings) – strings
- Karen Karlsrud (The Chic Strings) – strings
- Cheryl Hong (The Chic Strings) – strings
- Karen Milne (The Chic Strings) – strings
- Valerie Haywood (The Chic strings) – strings
- Gene Orloff – concertmaster
- Alfred Brown – strings contractor

=== Production ===
- Bernard Edwards – producer for Chic Organization Ltd.
- Nile Rodgers – producer for Chic Organization Ltd.
- Kenny Lehman – co-producer (track A4)
- Jackson Schwartz – engineer
- Jeff Hendrickson – engineer
- Jim Galante – engineer
- Peter Robbins – engineer
- Ray Willard – engineer
- Burt Szerlip – engineer
- Dennis King – mastering
- All songs recorded and mixed at Power Station in New York. Mastered at Atlantic Studios, N.Y.

== Charts ==
Chart performance for Les Plus Grands Succès De Chic: Chic's Greatest Hits
Chart (1979–1980)	Peak position
Dutch Albums (Album Top 100)	47
UK Albums (OCC)	30
US Billboard 200	88
US Top R&B/Hip-Hop Albums (Billboard)	44
