= Up All Night (The Chic Organization album) =

Compilation album by Nile Rodgers presents The Chic Organization
- Released: 2013
- Recorded: 1977–82
- Genre: Disco / Funk / R&B / Jazz / Samba
- Label: Rhino Records
- Producer: Bernard Edwards and Nile Rodgers

Up All Night is a compilation album by Nile Rodgers and The Chic Organization, released in 2013. It contains recordings written, played and produced by Rodgers and Bernard Edwards for various artists including Sister Sledge, Diana Ross, Sheila & B. Devotion, Deborah Harry, Norma Jean Wright, Carly Simon, Johnny Mathis and their own group Chic. In its original form, the album included every UK Top 40 hit single produced by Chic, excepting remixes. The Johnny Mathis track was widely publicised as being previously unreleased, though it had in fact appeared on Mathis' own Ultimate Collection CD in 2011. The project was conceived originally in 2008 by Wayne A. Dickson, who was consulting for Warner UK at the time. It was then green-lit and shelved several times. In April 2013 when Daft Punk's 'Get Lucky' entered the UK singles chart, Dickson resubmitted the idea to Warner UK's then head of catalogue, Dan Chalmers, who then fast tracked the release for July with Dickson compiling and sequencing an abridged version of his original 3-CD concept.

The album was released in the UK and Europe at a time when interest in Rodgers and CHIC was high for various reasons: the publication of Rodgers' autobiography in 2011, the appearance of BBC television and radio documentaries about him, the popularity of his collaboration with Daft Punk, "Get Lucky" (which is referenced in the compilation's title and sleeve art), and a series of acclaimed live performances including one televised from the Glastonbury Festival on the weekend before the album's release.

All of the tracks featured are the original 12" versions and are mastered to match the pitch and tempo of the original vinyl releases; this resulted in some tracks having slightly shorter running times than on other CD issues.

Up All Night reached number 2 in the UK Compilation Albums Chart for the week ending 13 July 2013.

== Track listing ==
All tracks written and produced by Bernard Edwards and Nile Rodgers, and are the original album versions unless otherwise noted.

=== CD1 ===
1. "Le Freak" – Chic
2. "He's The Greatest Dancer" – Sister Sledge
3. "Upside Down" – Diana Ross
4. "Everybody Dance" (12" Version) – Chic
5. "We Are Family" – Sister Sledge
6. "Spacer" (12" Version) – Sheila & B. Devotion
7. "I Want Your Love" – Chic
8. "Lost In Music" – Sister Sledge
9. "Saturday" – Norma Jean Wright
10. "Dance, Dance, Dance (Yowsah, Yowsah, Yowsah)" – Chic
11. "Got To Love Somebody" – Sister Sledge
12. "My Feet Keep Dancing" – Chic

=== CD2 ===
1. "Good Times" – Chic
2. "I'm Coming Out" – Diana Ross
3. "Why" (12" Version) – Carly Simon
4. "My Forbidden Lover" (12" Version) – Chic
5. "Thinking of You" – Sister Sledge
6. "I Love My Lady" – Johnny Mathis
7. "Backfired" (12' Remix) – Debbie Harry
8. "Soup for One" (12" Version) – Chic
9. "High Society" (12" Version) – Norma Jean Wright
10. "Reach Your Peak" (12" Version) – Sister Sledge
11. "Your Love Is Good" (12" Remix Version) – Sheila
12. "My Old Piano" – Diana Ross
13. "Chic Cheer" – Chic

== The Disco Edition ==
A second version of the album was released in October 2013, omitting some of the less well-known tracks in favour of three UK number one hits produced by Nile Rodgers, a new megamix and a live medley taken from Chic's performance at the 2013 Glastonbury Festival. It was given a four-star rating by AllMusic.

=== CD1 ===
1. "Le Freak" – Chic
2. "He's The Greatest Dancer" – Sister Sledge
3. "Upside Down" – Diana Ross
4. "Everybody Dance" (12" Version) – Chic
5. "We Are Family" – Sister Sledge
6. "Spacer" (12" Version) – Sheila & B. Devotion
7. "I Want Your Love" – Chic
8. "Saturday" – Norma Jean Wright
9. "Dance, Dance, Dance (Yowsah, Yowsah, Yowsah)" – Chic
10. "Lost In Music" – Sister Sledge
11. "My Feet Keep Dancing" – Chic
12. "My Old Piano" – Diana Ross
13. "Chic Cheer" – Chic

=== CD2 ===
1. "Good Times" – Chic
2. "I'm Coming Out" – Diana Ross
3. "Why" (12" Version) – Carly Simon
4. "My Forbidden Lover" (12" Version) – Chic
5. "Thinking Of You" – Sister Sledge
6. "I Love My Lady" – Johnny Mathis
7. "Your Love Is Good" (12" Remix Version) – Sheila
8. "Like a Virgin" (Extended Dance Mix) – Madonna
9. "Frankie" – Sister Sledge
10. "The Reflex (7″ Remix)" – Duran Duran
11. "The Chic MiniMix" – The Chic Organization
12. "Medley: Lady (Hear Me Tonight)/Like a Virgin/Notorious/Let's Dance/Rapper's Delight/Good Times" (Live at Glastonbury 2013) – Chic featuring Nile Rodgers
