= Now 03 (Australian series) =

Compilation album by Various Artists
- Released: 28 April 2003
- Label: EMI

Australian series chronology
Now 02 (2002)	Now 03 (2003)	Now 04 (2003)

Now 03 is a compilation CD released under EMI Music Australia. It was released in early 2003 and contained a limited edition special bonus DVD. The album was certified gold.

== Track listing ==
1. Missy Elliott – "Work It" (4:22)
2. Craig David – "Hidden Agenda" (3:33)
3. Atomic Kitten – "Be with You" (Milky 7" Edit) (3:34)
4. Robbie Williams – "Feel" (3:39)
5. Stacie Orrico – "Stuck" (3:42)
6. Disco Montego – "U Talkin' to Me" (3:50)
7. Jeremy Gregory – "That's What's Going Down" (3:20)
8. Justin Timberlake – "Like I Love You" (Basement Jaxx Mix) (6:02)
9. The Living End – "One Said to the Other" (3:31)
10. Liberty X vs. Richard X – "Being Nobody" (3:37)
11. The Soundbluntz – "Billie Jean" (4:00)
12. Jakatta featuring Seal – "My Vision" (Joey Negro 7" Club Mix) (3:44)
13. Norah Jones – "Don't Know Why" (3:07)
14. Snoop Dogg featuring Pharrell and Uncle Charlie Wilson – "Beautiful" (3:20)
15. Coldplay – "Clocks" (4:11)
16. Who Da Funk featuring Jessica Eve – "Shiny Disco Balls" (3:14)
17. Jennifer Love Hewitt – "Can I Go Now" (3:34)
18. DJ Sneak featuring Bear Who – "Fix My Sink" (3:23)
19. Taxiride – "Afterglow" (4:07)

=== DVD ===
1. Stacie Orrico – "Stuck"
2. Disco Montego – "U Talkin' to Me"
3. Jeremy Gregory – "That's What's Going Down"
4. The Soundbluntz – "Billie Jean"
5. Jakatta – "My Vision"
6. Who Da Funk – "Shiny Disco Balls"
7. Jennifer Love Hewitt – "Can I Go Now"
8. DJ Sneak – "Fix My Sink"
9. Taxiride – "Afterglow"
