= It Could Be You (disambiguation) =

It Could Be You is a 1956-1961 American game show hosted by Bill Leyden.

It Could Be You may also refer to:

== Film and television ==
- It Could Be You (Australian game show), a 1960s game show hosted by Tommy Hanlon, Jr.
- It Could Be You (film), a 2005 British film featuring Ameet Chana
- "It Could Be You", an episode of the MTV documentary series True Life

== Music ==
- "It Could Be You", a song by Blur from The Great Escape
- "It Could Be You", a song by Def Leppard from On Through the Night
- "It Could Be You", a song by Fischer-Z from Fish's Head
- "It Could Be You", a song by Selwyn from One Way
- "It Could Be You (Instead of Him)", a song by Johnny Cash from Songs of Our Soil

== See also ==
- It Could Be Yours (disambiguation)
