= Danger (Katie Underwood song) =

Single by Katie Underwood
- B-side: "remixes"
- Released: September 2003
- Recorded: 2003
- Genre: Dance, pop
- Length: 3:23
- Label: Transistor Music
- Songwriter(s): James Dempster, Katie Underwood, Simon Hosford

Katie Underwood singles chronology
"Good Times" (2002)	"Danger" (2003)	"Be Together" (2006)

"Danger" is the debut single from Australian singer songwriter, Katie Underwood. The single was released in September 2003 and peaked at number 33 in Australia. It was the only solo single Underwood recorded, as the record label collapsed soon after its release. In a 2014 interview, Underwood said; “I kind of gave up for a while after that, I really just lost my mojo and thought "Oh what’s the point, I’m creating my guts out over here. Meanwhile my fate’s in the hands of a guy who can’t decide whether to run a record label or not"".

At the APRA Music Awards of 2004 the song was nominated for 'Most performed dance work', losing out to "U Talkin' to Me" by Disco Montego.

== Track listing ==
Australian CD Maxi

1. "Danger" (Radio Mix) - 3:23
2. "Danger" (Acoustic Mix) - 3:26
3. "Danger" (mrTimothy Pericolo Radio Edit) - 3:34
4. "Danger" (mrTimothy Club Mix) - 5:34
5. "Danger" (mrTimothy Pericolo Remix) - 4:58
6. "Danger" (Quasimodo 'Hazardhouse' 12" Ride) - 7:32

== Charts ==
Chart (2003)	Peak position
Australia (ARIA)	33
