= Now That's What I Call Music! 4 =

Now That's What I Call Music! 4 may refer to two albums such as:

- Now That's What I Call Music 4 (UK series), 1984 album
- Now That's What I Call Music! 4 (U.S. series), 2000 album
- Now 4 Australian series 2003 release
