= Meant to Be =

Meant to Be may refer to:

- Meant to Be (John Scofield album), 1991
- Meant to Be (Selwyn album), 2002
- "Meant to Be" (Bebe Rexha song), 2017
- "Meant to Be" (Sammy Kershaw song), 1996
- Meant to Be (South Korean TV series), a 2023 television drama series
- Meant to Be (Philippine TV series), a 2017 Philippine television drama series
- Meant to Be, a 2012 film starring Dean Cain
- "Meant to Be", a song by Craig David from 22 (2022)
- "Meant to Be", a song by Squirrel Nut Zippers from Hot (1996)
- "Meant to Be", a song by Testament from Para Bellum (2025)

== See also ==
- Meant to Beh, a 2017 Philippine film
