= Rock Me All Night =

2000 single by Disco Montego (Kaylan)

Single by Kaylan

from the album No Commandments
- B-side: "Never Ask for More"
- Released: March 2000
- Length: 3:59
- Label: WEA
- Songwriters: Dennis Dowlut; Darren Dowlut
- Producer: Rockmelons

Kaylan singles chronology
"Rock Me All Night" (2000)	"Shake It" (2000)

"Rock Me All Night" is a song by Australian dance music duo Kaylan (later known as Disco Montego), released as their debut single in March 2000. It served as the lead single from their first album, No Commandments (2000). The song peaked at number 14 on the Australian ARIA Singles Chart.

In an interview in September 2000, the band was asked if they were surprised with the success of the song. They replied, "I think we did really well considering we're a new band, it's hard for people to accept new bands, and especially a track that we've written ourselves."

== Critical reception ==
Brendan Swift of AllMusic (in a review of the album) said; "The opening hit single, "Rock Me All Night" an infectious R&B starter, is light and catchy entertainment".

== Track listing ==
Australian CD single

1. "Rock Me All Night" (extended mix with rap) – 3:59
2. "Never Ask for More" – 3:08
3. "Rock Me All Night" (Groovallicious mix) – 5:14
4. "Rock Me All Night" (Extended Mix [with rap]) – 4:51
5. "Rock Me All Night" (Groove Quantize mix) – 5:44

== Charts ==
Chart (2000)	Peak position
Australia (ARIA)	14

== Certifications ==
Region	Certification	Certified units/sales
Australia (ARIA)	Gold	35,000^{^}
^{^} Shipments figures based on certification alone.
