= Disco Montego (album) =

Studio album by Disco Montego
- Released: 9 September 2002
- Recorded: 2001–2002
- Genre: Pop, electronic, house
- Label: Warner Music Group
- Producer: Disco Montego, Michael Szumowski, Thruster, Rockmelons, Rob Woolf

Disco Montego chronology
No Commandments (2000)	Disco Montego (2002)	Remixes (2003)

Singles from Disco Montego
- 1. "We Got Love" Released: May 2001; 2. "Beautiful" Released: May 2002; 3. "Magic" Released: 12 August 2002; 4. "U Talkin' to Me" Released: 2 December 2002

Disco Montego is the second studio album by Australian pop duo Disco Montego. It was released in September 2002 and peaked at number 17 in Australia (see 2002 in music).

== Reviews ==
Annemarie Failla from Female said; "To get the right vibe happening on the album, Darren and Dennis set about finding fresh faces on the music scene, to lend their vocal talents. The end result is an intoxicating cocktail of surprise and delight; a musical journey spanning the 70s through to the new millennium" adding "With such a diverse collection of dance tracks, this debut album from Disco Montego is tipped to be one of the hottest and coolest albums released this year and will certainly blow your mind!".

== Track listing ==
CD

1. "Magic" (featuring Katie Underwood) -3:53
2. "All I Want" (featuring Daniel Merriweather) - 5:10
3. "Alive" (featuring Jade McRae) - 4:36
4. "We Got Love" - 5:43
5. "Beautiful" (featuring Katie Underwood) - 3:42
6. "I Belong To You" (featuring Jeremy Gregory) - 5:32
7. "Get Me Started" - 4:59
8. "If Only Tonite" (featuring Jade McRae) - 4:08
9. "Because of You" (Dance Mix) - 7:04
10. "Turning Around" (featuring Juanita Tippins) - 4:43
11. "Stand Up" (featuring Rob Woolf) - 4:49
12. "U Talkin' to Me" - 5:10

Bonus Remix disc

1. "We Got Love" (Studio 347 Mix) - 8:06
2. "Beautiful" (Disco Montego Remix) - 5:58
3. "Magic" (Mark John & Simon Grey 12" L.A.P Ride) - 8:04
4. "Beautiful" (James Ash Mix) - 6:02

== Charts ==
Chart (2002)	Peak position
Australian Albums (ARIA)	17
