= We Got Love =

We Got Love may refer to:

- We Got Love (album), a 2017 album by The Kelly Family
- "We Got Love" (Bobby Rydell song), 1959
- "We Got Love" (Disco Montego song), 2001
- "We Got Love" (Jessica Mauboy song), Australian entry in the Eurovision Song Contest 2018
- "We Got Love" (Sigala song), a 2019 Sigala song featuring Ella Henderson
- "We Got Love" (Teyana Taylor song), a 2019 Teyana Taylor song
- "We Got Love" (Real Thing), 1984
- "We Got Love", a bonus song on The Beach Boys' album Holland

== See also ==
- "We Got the Love", a 1993 song by Restless Heart
