= Now That's What I Call Music! 2 =

Now That's What I Call Music! 2 or Now 2 may refer to four "Now That's What I Call Music!" series albums.

- Now That's What I Call Music II (UK series), released on 26 March 1984
- Now That's What I Call Music! 2 (Asia), released on 9 August 1996
- Now That's What I Call Music! 2 (U.S. series), released on 27 July 1999
- Now 02 Australian series 2002 release

== See also ==
- Now That's What I Call Music! discography
