= Now That's What I Call Music! 5 =

Now That's What I Call Music! 5 or Now 5 may refer to at least three different "Now That's What I Call Music!"-series albums, including

- Now That's What I Call Music 5 (original UK series, 1985 release)
- Now That's What I Call Music! 5 (U.S. series, 2000 release)
- Now 05 (Australian series, 2004 release)
