= Now 04 (Australian series) =

Compilation album by Various Artists
- Released: 15 September 2003
- Label: EMI

Australian series chronology
Now 03 (2003)	Now 04 (2003)	Now 05 (2004)

Now 04 is a compilation CD released under EMI Music Australia in 2003. Starting with this album, the CD contained pictures on the front and back covers. The album was the #11 compilation of the year and was certified platinum.

== Track listing ==
1. Jewel – "Intuition" (3:48)
2. Stacie Orrico – "(There's Gotta Be) More to Life" (3:20)
3. Amiel Daemion – "Obsession (I Love You)" (3:53)
4. Amanda Perez – "Angel" (3:37)
5. Robbie Williams – "Something Beautiful" (4:01)
6. Sean Paul – "Get Busy" (3:32)
7. The J Wess Project – "Bang This" (3:35)
8. Chingy – "Right Thurr" (3:37)
9. Dannii Minogue – "Don't Wanna Lose This Feeling" (3:31)
10. Benny Benassi – "Satisfaction" (3:11)
11. Liam Lynch – "United States of Whatever" (1:28)
12. Panjabi MC featuring Jay-Z – "Mundian To Bach Ke (Beware of the Boys)" (3:00)
13. Missy Elliott featuring Ludacris – "Gossip Folks" (Fatboy Slim Radio Remix) (3:30)
14. Mis-Teeq – "Scandalous" (Stargate Radio Mix) (3:58)
15. Bec Cartwright – "A Matter of Time" (3:28)
16. Sophie Monk – "One Breath Away" (3:39)
17. Michael Woods featuring Imogen Bailey – "If U Want Me" (Lifestylers Edit) (3:33)
18. Matchbox Twenty – "Unwell" (3:48)
19. Coldplay – "God Put a Smile upon Your Face" (4:57)
20. Hot Action Cop – "Fever for the Flava" (3:41)
21. Mandy Kane – "Stab" (3:49)
22. Groove Terminator – "Here Comes Another One" (2:59)
