= Now That's What I Call Music! 3 =

Now That's What I Call Music! 3 may refer to at least four different Now That's What I Call Music!-series albums, including

- Now That's What I Call Music 3 (original UK series, 1984 release)
- Now That's What I Call Music! 3 (US series, 1999 release)
- Now That's What I Call Music! 3 (Asia series, 1997 release)
- Now 3 Australian series 2003 release
