= Brendon Walmsley =

Australian singer-songwriter

- Genres: country
- Occupations: Musician; singer-songwriter
- Instrument: Vocals
- Years active: 2000-present
- Labels: Festival Records

Brendon Walmsley is an Australian singer-songwriter.

In 2011, Walmsley released The Best of Brendon Walmsley, an 18-track collection, including "Remember January", a song commemorating the 2010–11 Queensland floods.

In 2013, Walmsley was cast as "The Phantom" in Andrew Lloyd Webber's hit musical The Phantom Of The Opera in the 2014 Empire Theatre stage show.

== Discography ==
=== Studio albums ===
List of studio albums
Title	Album details
A Little Time	Released: 2000; Format: Compact Disc; Label: Compass Bros., Festival Records (D32246)
Never Say Never	Released: 2001; Format: CD; Label: Compass Bros., Festival Records (D34342)
Bottle Tree Lane	Released: January 2004; Format: CD

=== Compilation albums ===
List of compilation albums
Title	Album details
The Best of Brendon Walmsley	Released: 2012; Format: Compact Disc, digital download

== Awards ==
=== APRA Awards ===
The APRA Awards are held in Australia and New Zealand by the Australasian Performing Right Association to recognise songwriting skills, sales and airplay performance by its members annually.

Year	Nominee / work	Award	Result
2003	"Never Never"	Most Performed Country Work	Nominated

=== Country Music Awards of Australia ===
The Country Music Awards of Australia (CMAA) (also known as the Golden Guitar Awards) is an annual awards night held in January during the Tamworth Country Music Festival, celebrating recording excellence in the Australian country music industry. They have been held annually since 1973.

Year	Nominee / work	Award	Result
2000	"Rose & Rodeo" by Brendon Walmsley	New Talent of the Year	Won
2001	"Last of the Big Gun Drovers" by Brendon Walmsley	Heritage Song of the Year	Won
2002	"Never Never" by Brendon Walmsley	Heritage Song of the Year	Won

=== Tamworth Songwriters Awards ===
The Tamworth Songwriters Association (TSA) is an annual songwriting contest for original country songs, awarded in January at the Tamworth Country Music Festival. They commenced in 1986. Brendon Walmsley has won five awards.

Year	Nominee / work	Award	Result (wins only)
2000	"Rose and Rodeo" by Brendon Walmsley	New Songwriter Award	Won
2001	"Last of the Big Gun Drovers" by Brendon Walmsley	Traditional Bush Ballad of the Year	Won
2005	"Patches" by Brendon and Judy Walmsley and Graeme Watt	Contemporary Song of the Year	Won
2005	"Bottle Tree Lane" by Brendon Walmsley	Country Ballad of the Year	Won
2008	"When God Takes a Photograph" by Brendon Walmsley with Merelyn and David Carter	Gospel Song of the Year	Won

== Current Work ==
Brendon is currently working as a Pastor at HumeRidge Church of Christ in Toowoomba.
