= Shake It (Kaylan song) =

2000 single by Kaylan

Single by Kaylan

from the album No Commandments
- Released: August 2000
- Length: 3:52
- Label: WEA
- Songwriters: Steve Kipper, Jack Kugell
- Producers: Steve Kipper, Jack Kugell

Kaylan singles chronology
"Rock Me All Night" (2000)	"Shake It" (2000)	"Because of You" (2001)

"Shake It" is a song by Australian dance music duo Kaylan, later known as Disco Montego. It was released in August 2000 as the second single from their debut album, No Commandments (2000). The song peaked at number 15 on the Australian ARIA Singles Chart, becoming the band's second top-20 single.

== Track listing ==
Australian CD single

1. "Shake It"
2. "Shake It" (Studio 347 R'N'B mix)
3. "Shake It" (Studio 347 Dance mix)
4. "Shake It" (Chili Hi Fly mix)

== Weekly charts ==
Chart (2000)	Peak position
Australia (ARIA)	15
