= Rockies 3 =

Studio album by Rockmelons
- Released: 14 October 2002
- Genre: Electronic music, Funk music, Soul music, Pop rock, Garage-House music
- Label: Mushroom Records
- Producer: Rockmelons, Dave Boxcar, Jazibel

Rockmelons chronology
| Form 1 Planet (1992) | Rockies 3 (2002) | Serious Fun: Tales of the Rockmelons (2015) |

Singles from Rockies 3
- 1. "All I Want Is You" Released: June 2002; 2. "I Ain't Playin" Released: September 2002

Rockies 3 is the third studio album by Australian rock band Rockmelons. It was released in October 2002.

The lead single "All I Want is You" peaked at number 41 in Australia and was nominated for 2003 APRA Most Performed Dance Work.

== Review ==
A reviewer at Femail called Rockies 3 "a diverse collection of irresistible grooves, soul-drenched melodies and infectious vocal hooks and performances. However, it's interesting to note that the Rockmelons don't set about to make a series of tunes that belong in specific genre categories, their approach seems to be more organic and a mash-up of all of the sounds that they've loved the most over the years", and adding "Rockmelons have once again managed to produce a well-balanced album that is a hybrid of their ol' school sensibilities and a soulful dancefloor spin that sounds perfect within the current musical climate."

== Track listing ==
CD/DD

1. "All I Want Is You" (featuring Jeremy Gregory) - 3:56
2. "I Ain't Playin'" (featuring Roxane LeBrasse) - 3:48
3. "Only Love Will Take Us There" (featuring Jeremy Gregory) - 5:04
4. "One Good Reason" (featuring Darren Paul) - 4:52
5. "Find My Way Home" (featuring Doug Williams) - 5:57
6. "I Got News For You" (featuring Roxane LeBrasse) - 4:15
7. "Game Tight" (featuring Roxane LeBrasse) - 4:06
8. "Another Beautiful Day" (featuring Emma Morton) - 5:00
9. "C'est L'amour (Love Is Still The Message)" (featuring Corinne Michel and Sydney Bouhaniche) - 6:59
10. "Three's a Crowd" (featuring Evelyn Rubuen) - 3:36
11. "Interplanetary" (featuring Bryon Jones) - 5:20
12. "How Could You Say It?" (featuring Cavan Te) - 3:59
13. "All I Want Is You" (Funk Corporation Club Mix) - 7:33
14. "I Ain't Playin'" (Funk Corporation vs. Aviators Club Mix) - 8:38
