= We Got Love (Disco Montego song) =

Single by Disco Montego

from the album Disco Montego
- B-side: "remixes"
- Released: May 2001
- Recorded: 2001
- Genre: Dance
- Length: 3:55
- Label: Warner Music
- Songwriter(s): Dennis Dowlut, Darren Dowlut, Ken Gold, Michael Denne, Tony Vass
- Producer(s): Groove Quantize, Rockmelons, Studio 347

Disco Montego singles chronology
"Because of You" (2001)	"We Got Love" (2001)	"Beautiful" (2002)

"We Got Love" is a dance/pop song by Australian dance duo, Disco Montego. It was released in May 2001 and was the first release by Disco Montego since changing their name from Kaylan.

The song contains a sample of "Heartache No.9" by Delegation.

It was released as the first single from their studio album, Disco Montego (2002). "We Got Love" peaked at number 98 on the ARIA Chart and number 6 on the Australian Club Chart.

== Track listing ==
Australian CD single

1. "We Got Love" (Radio Edit) - 3:55
2. "We Got Love" (Extended Mix) - 5:43
3. "We Got Love" (Studio 347 Remix) - 8:05
4. "We Got Love" (Hayden's Remix) - 7:33

12"

- A.1 We Got Love (Extended Mix) - 5:44
- A.2 We Got Love (Radio Edit) - 3:56
- B.1 We Got Love (Studio 347 Remix) - 8:08

== Charts ==
Chart (2001)	Peak position
Australia (ARIA)	98
