= On the Borderline =

Single by Bec Cartwright

from the album Bec Cartwright
- Released: April 21, 2003
- Recorded: 2003
- Genre: Pop
- Length: 3:22
- Label: Warner Music
- Songwriter(s): Matt Prime; Liz Winstanley
- Producer(s): Tony Cvetkovski

Bec Cartwright singles chronology
"All Seats Taken" (2002)	"On the Borderline" (2003)	"A Matter of Time" (2003)

"On the Borderline" is the second single from Bec Cartwright's debut album, Bec Cartwright. It peaked at #29 on the Australian Singles Chart.

== Music video ==
A music video was produced to promote the single.

== Track listing ==
1. "On the Borderline" (Radio Mix) - 3:21
2. "On the Borderline" (Real Groover Mix) - 4:43
3. "On the Borderline" (Fathead Remix) - 4:31
4. "On the Borderline" (Euph Extended Mix) - 5:03
5. "On the Borderline" (Karaoke Mix) - 3:19

== Charts ==
Chart (2003)	Peak position
Australia (ARIA)	29
