= Bec Cartwright (album) =

Studio album by Bec Cartwright
- Released: 16 June 2003
- Recorded: 2002–2003
- Genre: Pop
- Length: 34:02
- Label: East West Records, Warner Music

Singles from Bec Cartwright
- 1. "All Seats Taken" Released: 18 November 2002; 2. "On the Borderline" Released: 21 April 2003; 3. "A Matter of Time" Released: 25 August 2003

Professional ratings
Review scores
Source	Rating
Smash Hits	2/5 stars

Bec Cartwright is the first and only album by Australian actress/singer Bec Cartwright, released in Australia on 16 June 2003, by East West Records through Warner Music. Three singles were released from the album: "All Seats Taken", "On the Borderline" and "A Matter of Time" – all to top 30 success in Australia.

== Track listing ==
1. "On the Borderline" – 3:22
2. "All That Glitters" – 3:08
3. "All Seats Taken" – 3:31
4. "A Matter of Time" – 3:34
5. "Meant to Be" – 3:18
6. "Drive By" – 3:24
7. "What's Got into You" – 3:38
8. "Falling" – 3:16
9. "Need a Little Love" – 3:25
10. "He's Yours" – 3:24

== Charts ==
Chart (2003)	Peak position
Australian Albums (ARIA)	21
