= The Contemporary Singers =

The Contemporary Singers of Australia are an Australian chamber choir based in Sydney, New South Wales dedicated to the choral music of the 20th century. The group was formed in late 1986 by visiting Canadian composer David Colwell with assistance from the University of Sydney and the NSW State Conservatorium of Music. Colwell directed the Singers for their first year, passing the leadership to Antony Walker and Elliott Gyger, who directed the Singers until 1999. Many of the original members were composition students of Peter Sculthorpe including Stephen Adams, Matthew Hindson, and Canadian composer Jana Skarecky.

The Contemporary Singers varied in size between 12 and 30 voices, and developed a repertoire of over 70 works by about 55 different composers, giving Australian premiere performances of many significant works for chamber choir. Some members also sang with the Sydney Chamber Choir and subsequently with Walker's professional choir Cantillation.

The Singers' first recording, Sydney Dreaming (ABC Classics 454 510–2, 1996) showcased Anne Boyd's As I Crossed a Bridge of Dreams and Veni sancte spiritus--veni creator by Jennifer Fowler. They are featured in Raffaele Marcellino's commission for the Sydney Olympic Games, Heart of Fire (ABC 465 948–2, 2000). Their recording of Nigel Butterley's The True Samaritan on There Came a Wind Like a Bugle (Tall Poppies TD142, 2001) won the APRA Award for Best Vocal or Choral Work of the Year in 2003.

== Awards and nominations ==
=== APRA-AMC Classical Music Awards ===
The APRA-AMC Classical Music Awards are presented annually by Australasian Performing Right Association (APRA) and Australian Music Centre (AMC).

Year	Nominee / work	Award	Result
2003	The True Samaritan (Nigel Butterley) – The Contemporary Singers	Vocal or Choral Work of the Year	Won
