= Old Fort Bay =

Human settlement

- Unincorporated community
- Interactive map of Old Fort Bay
- Coordinates: 25°02′38″N 77°30′14″W
- Country: The Bahamas
- Island: New Providence
- Supervisory district: Killarney
- Time zone: UTC-5 (Eastern (EST))
  - Summer (DST): UTC-4 (EDT)
- Area code: 242

Old Fort Bay (also Old Fort Bay Club) is a private gated community, club, and former British colonial fort located in northwestern New Providence Island in The Bahamas just east of Lyford Cay.

The clubhouse itself is the site of a fort that was built by the British during the 18th century to fend off pirates. It was then used as a plantation in the 19th century before being won by James Cox Brady, Jr, the father of Nicholas F. Brady in 1920. Following Brady's death, his wife's new husband, C. Suydam Cutting took over the property and filled it with treasures from around the world. The fort was abandoned after the widow's death.

Restoration and development on a private community and club began in 2002 by British businessman Joe Lewis with the Tavistock Group and the New Providence Development Company (NPDCo). It opened a year later. H. Hunter "Terry" White III took over in 2011.

== Notable residents ==
- Bec Hewitt
- Lleyton Hewitt
- Shakira
- Shania Twain

== Old Fort Bay Town Centre ==
The Old Fort Bay Town Centre is a shopping plaza located just outside the easternmost gates of Old Fort Bay. It is also the location of Fresh Market.
