= Village Kid =

Australian musical group

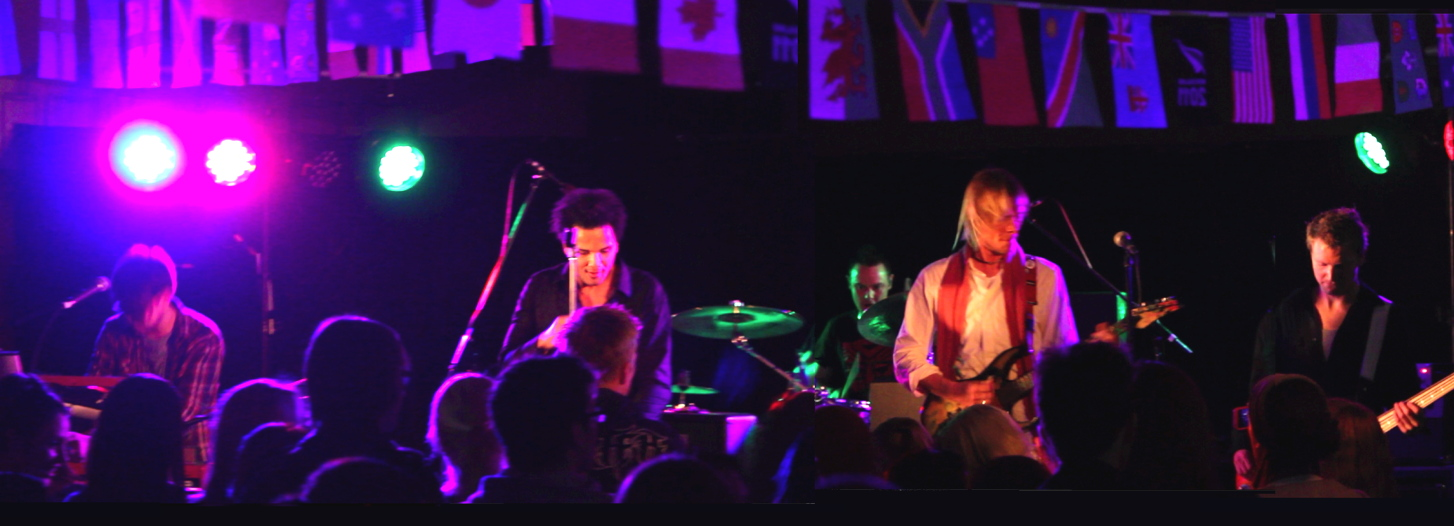

Background information
- Origin: Perth, Western Australia, Australia
- Years active: 2010–present
- Label: Independent
- Members: Jeremy Gregory; Michael Tan; Matt Bell
- Past members: Aaron Malone; Matt Bartel; Michael Burn
- Website: www.villagekidband.com

Village Kid are an Australian band based in Perth, Western Australia.

The group has released one E.P. Colourful Girl in July 2010, recorded with vocalist Aaron Malone with producer Anthony Cormican (Birds of Tokyo). The E.P. generally received favourable reviews. In September 2010, the title track from this E.P. was awarded the grand prize in the 2010 John Lennon Songwriting Contest. By late 2010, they had toured with The Black Sorrows, Thirsty Merc, Human Nature and had won Mix 94.5's contest to support Bon Jovi at Paterson's Stadium.

The E.P. sold out of the print run of 1,000 copies, however, before the second E.P. could be completed, vocalist Aaron Malone left the band to be replaced with Jeremy Gregory, who had recently returned to Perth from Los Angeles where he was signed to Warner Bros. Records. After several member changes in 2011, the line-up consisted of Jeremy Gregory, Michael Tan and Matt Bell, with producer Anthony Cormican often performing with the band as the lead guitarist, and John Sherrit as the band's sound engineer.

The band is known for an eclectic mix of R&B, classical and pop. Thirsty Merc bass player Phil Stack has described the band as sounding like "Stevie Wonder meets Debussy meets Queen".

== Members ==
- Jeremy Gregory - vocals
- Michael Tan - keyboards, synthesiser, violin, guitar, programming
- Matt Bell - synthesiser, guitar, bass, programming

== Discography ==
=== Albums/EPs ===
- Colourful Girl (July 2010)
