= No Commandments =

Studio album by Kaylan
- Released: September 2000
- Recorded: 2000
- Genre: Pop, electronic
- Label: Warner Music
- Producer: Rockmelons

Kaylan chronology
No Commandments (2000)	Disco Montego (2002)

Singles from No Commandments
- 1. "Rock Me All Night" Released: March 2000; 2. "Shake It" Released: August 2000; 3. "Because of You" Released: March 2001

No Commandments is the debut studio album by Australian pop duo Kaylan . It was released in September 2000 and peaked at number 22 in Australia (see 2000 in music).

In an interview with Girl magazine, band member Darren explained the title by saying "At the time of writing the album, we weren't living by any!"

== Reviews ==
Professional ratings
Review scores
Source	Rating
AllMusic	3/5 stars

Brendan Swift of AllMusic said; "Kaylan's debut album of R&B-pop firmly places the group in international class. The opening hit single, "Rock Me All Night" an infectious R&B starter, is light and catchy entertainment -- but where some other acts fall down, Kaylan back up their promise with an album that consistently delivers. Produced by Rockmelons, Kaylan pay homage to its influences -- Motown, Stevie Wonder, Prince and Earth, Wind and Fire -- without leaning too heavily on them. The acoustic-based "No Commandments" is funky and soulful while the second single, "Shake It" is straight-up funk. Other highlights include "Because of You," a laid-back tune in the Al Green tradition. The Dowlut brothers of Kaylan wrote eight of the 12 tracks on No Commandments, and there's a fair smattering of ballads which occasionally err on the side of average, but more often than not, they're as solid as the up-tempo numbers which shine through."

== Track listing ==
CD

1. "Rock Me All Night" - 3:59
2. "No Commandments" - 4:19
3. "Shake It" - 3:52
4. "Before I Let You Go" - 4:21
5. "Because of You" - 3:45
6. "Leave the Light On" - 4:42
7. "Chevrolet" - 5:57
8. "Hard to Let You Go" - 4:28
9. "Lift Me Up" - 4:06
10. "Forgive" - 3:59
11. "Falling" - 4:06
12. "Never Ask You for More" (Unplugged) - 3:11

Bonus Remix disc

1. "Shake It" (Studio 347 Dance Mix) - 7:46
2. "Rock Me All Night" (Rock Me Again Mix) - 4:22
3. "Chevrolet" (Hypnoteque Mix) - 5:56
4. "Lift Me Up" (Doogy Doogy Mix) - 4:18
5. "No Commandments" (The 1st Step) - 4:45

== Charts ==
Chart (2000)	Peak position
Australian Albums (ARIA)	22
