= Ashley Klose =

- Born: Adelaide, South Australia, Australia
- Occupations: Composer; Musical artist; Teacher; Sound producer

Ashley Klose is an Australian composer, musical artist, teacher and sound producer.

== Career ==
Klose's work has appeared in a range of film and television productions.

At the APRA-AGSC Screen Music Awards of 2003 Klose won the trophy for Best Music for an Educational, Training or Corporate Film/Video with his work on South Australian Film Corporation's SAFC: 30th Anniversary presentation. In 2007 he was one of twelve invited participants in the ASCAP Film and Television Scoring Workshop sponsored by American Society of Composers, Authors and Publishers (ASCAP).

=== Television and film ===
- Lockie Leonard: dialogue editor
- Errorism: A Comedy of Terrors (TV Series): sound, sound mixer
- Look Both Ways: dialogue editor, sound effects editor
- Shot of Love: supervising sound editor
- Young Blades: sound
- I Burn (short film): location sound recordist, sound designer, sound mixer
- Chuck Finn (TV series): effects editor - 17 episodes

=== Documentary ===
- The Quiet Room: (sound attachment)
- The Love Market (documentary)
- Sacred Ground (documentary)
- PictoCrime
- Moustache (short)
- Book Em (short)
- Offside (additional music)
- The Old Man Who Read Love Stories (music supervisor)
- The Quiet Room (conductor and music arranger)
