= One Way (Selwyn album) =

Studio album by Selwyn
- Released: (Australia) 1 November 2004
- Recorded: 2003–2004
- Genre: R&B/Pop
- Label: Sony BMG

Selwyn chronology
Meant to Be (2002)	One Way (2004)

One Way is the second album of Australian R&B singer Selwyn. It was released in Australia, USA and South Africa. It spawned one successful, ARIA top 20 single, "Boomin'" and one unsuccessful single, "Satisfactual". The album didn't make the ARIA top 100 chart, but peaked at number 38 on the ARIA Urban Album chart.

== Track listing ==
1. "Satisfactual"
2. "Say Hey Baby"
3. "Boomin'"
4. "Breathe"
5. "Showbiz"
6. "Cutie"
7. "King of the Jungle"
8. "Just Let Me Know"
9. "It Could Be You"
10. "Lil' Miss Thang" (featuring Israel)
11. "Hero"
12. "Definition of Music"
