= Katie Underwood =

Australian singer-songwriter (born 1975)

Katie Ashley Underwood
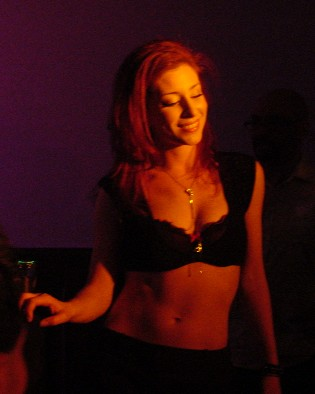

Background information
- Born: 23 December 1975 (age 50); Adelaide, South Australia, Australia
- Genres: Pop; Dance; Club; Jazz; Meditation
- Occupations: Singer; songwriter; meditation teacher; actress
- Instrument: Vocals
- Years active: 1999–present
- Member of: Bardot

Katie Ashley Underwood (born 23 December 1975) is an Australian singer-songwriter and meditation teacher. She is best known for being a member of Bardot, winners of the first Australian series of Popstars in 2000.

Since departing the group in 2001, her solo career has included numerous vocal appearances on dance tracks such as the Disco Montego Top 10 single "Beautiful", and dance act T-Funk single "Be Together".

== Career ==
=== 1999–2001: Early career and Bardot ===
In February 1999 in London, Underwood recorded a dance track with UK trance act Terra Ferma, releasing her first single "Don't Be Afraid" through Platipus Records in the UK. She also recorded three more tracks which were included on the Terra Ferma album, released in early 2000. After returning from the UK to Melbourne, Underwood began working with singer/songwriter Charlie Rooke (formerly of The Sharp) and they formed a jazz-swing band called Corduroy Lounge.

In October 1999, Underwood auditioned for the TV show Popstars, making it through to the final five. As a result, she was selected to join the girl group Bardot. The group achieved instant success with the number one hit "Poison" and number one debut album, headlined its own national tour and performed at the 2000 ARIA Awards in which it was nominated for three awards. Underwood travelled to New Zealand, Singapore, Taiwan and the UK, promoting with Bardot.

In early 2001, Underwood decided to leave the group in pursuit of a role in the Harry M. Miller's production of Hair. Unfortunately for Underwood, the production fell through due to financial problems. Underwood later spoke of the deep depression she fell into as a result of what most people thought was a foolish career decision, despite the fact that Bardot's commercial success after her departure was muted. She subsequently turned the tables and made a successful comeback, earning respect from entertainment critics for her resilience.

=== 2002–2010: Collaborations and solo releases ===
Focusing on her passion for the clubbing scene and dance music, Underwood returned to the spotlight in May 2002, collaborating with Australian dance duo Disco Montego, resulting in the top 10 ARIA hit "Beautiful" and further singles, "Magic" and "Good Times". During that same year, she starred in the reality television series Undercover Angels, which aimed to give a helping hand to people in need.

She released her first solo single "Danger" in September 2003 which peaked at number 33 on the singles chart and took a two-year break in which no music was released.

In June 2006, Underwood re-emerged with dance act T-Funk on the track "Be Together", topping the ARIA Club charts for five consecutive weeks. It peaked at number 31 on the mainstream singles chart. The music video of this track directed by Bangladeshi born Australian director Zayed Rizwan AKA Silk was nominated in the best music video category in Aria Awards 2007. In 2007, Underwood starred in a musical called Dark Angels, based on the story of a bisexual burlesque star.

In 2009, Underwood toured in a new musical, David Tydd's Valentino (about Rudolph Valentino), with fellow Bardot member Tiffani Wood and Normie Rowe.

In November 2009, Underwood self-released her debut studio album called Ain't Nobody's Baby.

During the 2010s, Underwood stepped out of the public spotlight and only made rare musical appearances in Melbourne. During this period she received multiple invites to appear as a contestant on The Voice; to humour the producers Underwood eventually accepted the invite but before reaching the blind auditions she refused to sign the contract that would have put her on the show.

During this decade, she established her own meditation business and released several meditative albums.

=== 2020–present: Ka'bel ===
In April 2020, to commemorate the 20th anniversary of the release of their debut single "Poison", Underwood and Bardot bandmates Tiffani Wood and Belinda Chapple reunited remotely online to perform the song. In September 2021, it was announced that Underwood and Chapple would professionally reunite as a duo under the name Ka'Bel, with their debut single "Broken Hearted" released on 15 October 2021.

In 2023, Underwood released two solo singles, "Feels So Good" and a re-recording of her 2003 Disco Montego collaboration, "Beautiful".

== Personal life ==
Born in Adelaide, South Australia, Underwood sang in a girls choir, and later studied Maths and Computer Science at University of Adelaide. After three years at university she dropped out and moved to Melbourne.

In June 2007, The Sydney Morning Herald printed an interview with Underwood about her bisexuality.

In July 2011, Underwood gave birth to twin daughters. She currently lives in Melbourne and is a meditation teacher and remedial massage therapist.

== Discography ==
=== Albums ===
List of studio albums
Title	Album details
Ain't Nobody's Baby	Released: 20 November 2009; Label: Empire Records; Formats: CD, digital download, streaming
Madrigal	Released: 13 February 2018; Label: Katie Underwood; Formats: CD, digital download, streaming
Journey to Mantra	Released: 1 February 2019; Label: Katie Underwood; Formats: Digital download, streaming
Awaken	Released: 23 March 2020; Label: Katie Underwood; Formats: Digital download, streaming
Elevate	Released: 6 August 2021; Label: Katie Underwood; Formats: Digital download, streaming

=== Extended plays ===
List of extended plays
Title	Album details
Mantra Dreaming	Released: 2 March 2021; Label: Katie Underwood; Formats: Digital download, streaming
Mantra Rising	Released: 2 March 2021; Label: Katie Underwood; Formats: Digital download, streaming

=== Singles ===
List of singles with selected chart positions and certifications
Single	Year	AUS peak position	Certification	Album
As lead artist
"Danger"	2003	33		Non-album single
"Awaken" (featuring Tikal De Meru)	2019	—		Awaken
"Feels So Good"	2023	—		Non-album single
"Beautiful 2023"	2023	—		Non-album single
As featured artist
"Don't Be Afraid" (Terra Ferma featuring Katie Ashley)	1999	—		The Adventures of...
"Beautiful" (Disco Montego featuring Katie Underwood)	2002	9	ARIA: Gold	Disco Montego
"Magic" (Disco Montego featuring Katie Underwood)	2002	22		Disco Montego
"Good Times" (Disco Montego featuring Selwyn, Katie Underwood, Peta Morris and Jeremy Gregory)	2002	52		Non-album singles
"Be Together" (T-Funk featuring Katie Underwood)	2006	31		Non-album singles
"Element" (Southlight featuring Katie Underwood)	2014	—		Non-album singles
"...Baby One More Time" (Greg Gould and Katie Underwood)	2022	—		1998
As part of a group
"Poison" (with Bardot)	2000	1	ARIA: 2× Platinum	Bardot
"I Should've Never Let You Go" (with Bardot)	2000	14	ARIA: Gold	Bardot
"These Days (with Bardot)	2000	19	ARIA: Gold	Bardot
"Twelve Days of Christmas" (with Dreamtime Christmas All-Stars)	2004	26		Non-album singles
"Broken Hearted" (with Ka'Bel)	2021	—		Non-album singles
"Heartstrings" (with Ka'Bel)	2022	—		Non-album singles
"Follow" (with Ka'Bel)	2023	—		Non-album singles
"One In a Million" (with Ka'Bel)	2024	—		Non-album singles

=== Other appearances ===
List of other appearances
Song	Year	Album
"Halfway" (with Evoletah)	2013	We Ache For the Moon
"Time" (with Evoletah)	2013	We Ache For the Moon
"Guillotine" (with Evoletah)	2013	We Ache For the Moon
"Black & Blue" (with Evoletah)	2013	We Ache For the Moon

== Notes ==
1.Underwood released a re-recorded solo version of "Beautiful" to mark its 20 year anniversary.
2.Underwood was credited as Katie Ashley for "Don't Be Afraid".
3.Ka'Bel is a collaboration between Underwood and Belinda Chapple.
