= Tales of the City (album) =

Studio album by Rockmelons
- Released: May 1988
- Genre: Rock
- Label: True Tone/PolyGram
- Producer: Robin Smith

Rockmelons chronology
Tales of the City (album) (1988)	Form 1 Planet (1992)

Singles from Tales of the City
- 1. "Rhymes" Released: July 1987; 2. "New Groove" Released: November 1987; 3. "What's It Gonna Be" Released: February 1988; 4. "Thief"/"Boogietron" Released: 4 July 1988; 5. "Jump" Released: October 1988

Tales of the City is the debut studio album by Australian rock band Rockmelons. It was released in May 1988 on True Tone Records and peaked at number six on the Australian album charts. The band shared the Australian Record Industry Association (ARIA) Award for 'Best Debut Album' in 1988 with 1927's album ...ish.

It was re-issued in 1992 by Mushroom Records.

The first single, "Rhymes", was a cover of Al Green's song, from his 1974 album, Al Green Is Love.

== Reception ==
Smash Hits said, "The plucky little Rockmelons finally come across with the goods, delighting their thousands of fans, confounding the doubting thomases, and failing to convert anyone else. You have a remarkably commercial album that's slightly muzak-ish and a little too jazzesque for me, but certainly like nothing else being done in Australia at the moment.

== Track listing ==
Tales of the City
No.	Title	Writer(s)	Producer(s)	Length
1.	"New Groove" (featuring John Kenny)	B. Jones; J. Jones; R. Medhurst; R. Smith	Robin Smith	4:39
2.	"What's It Gonna Be?" (featuring John Kenny)	B. Jones; J. Jones; R. Medhurst; R. Smith	Robin Smith	4:46
3.	"Jump" (featuring Wendy Matthews)	Curtis Mayfield	The Rockmelons	2:31
4.	"Thief" (featuring John Kenny)	B. Jones; J. Jones; R. Medhurst	The Rockmelons	3:21
5.	"Dreams in the Empty City" (featuring John Kenny)	B. Jones; J. Jones; R. Medhurst	The Rockmelons	3:45
6.	"Get Back on the Groove" (featuring John Kenny)	B. Jones; J. Jones; R. Medhurst; R. Smith	Robin Smith	4:56
7.	"Rhymes" (featuring John Kenny)	A. Green; M. Hodges	Robin Smith	4:43
8.	"Boogietron" (featuring John Kenny)	B. Jones; J. Jones	The Rockmelons	4:22
9.	"Money Talks" (featuring John Kenny)	B. Jones; J. Jones; R. Medhurst; R. Smith	The Rockmelons	3:59

== Personnel ==
Credited to:

Rockmelons

- Raymond Medhurst – keyboards
- Byron Jones – keyboards, bass guitar, vocals
- Jonathon Jones – keyboards, guitar, drums
- John Kenny – vocals
- Mary Azzopardi – vocals
- Wendy Matthews – vocals

Recording details

- Producer – Robin Smith
- Engineer – Barry Rudolph

== Charts ==
=== Weekly charts ===
Chart (1988)	Peak position
Australian Albums (ARIA)	14

=== Year-end charts ===
Chart (1988)	Position
Australian Albums (ARIA)	31
