= Form 1 Planet =

Studio album by Rockmelons
- Released: 24 July 1992
- Recorded: 1991
- Genre: Rock
- Label: Mushroom

Rockmelons chronology
Tales of the City (1988)	Form 1 Planet (1992)	Rockies 3 (2002)

Singles from Form 1 Planet
- 1. "Ain't No Sunshine" Released: October 1991; 2. "That Word (L.O.V.E.)" Released: April 1992; 3. "It's Not Over" Released: August 1992; 4. "Form One Planet" Released: January 1993; 5. "Stronger Together" Released: September 1994; 6. "Love's Gonna Bring You Home" Released: 1994 (Europe)

Form 1 Planet is the second studio album by Australian rock band Rockmelons. The album peaked at number 3 on the ARIA Charts and was certified platinum.

The album was re-released in 1994 under the title Stronger Together

== Track listing ==
Form 1 Planet
No.	Title	Writer(s)	Producer(s)	Length
1.	"That Word (L.O.V.E.)" (featuring Deni Hines)	B. Jones; J. Jones; R. Medhurst; R. Smith	D. Germain; The Rockmelons	4:10
2.	"Stronger Together" (featuring Doug Williams)	B. Jones; J. Jones; R. Medhurst; Nile Rogers	Nile Rogers; The Rockmelons	4:45
3.	"Form One Planet" (featuring Eric Sebastian)	B. Jones; J. Jones; R. Medhurst; John Lennon	The Rockmelons	4:13
4.	"It's Not Over" (featuring Deni Hines)	B. Jones; J. Jones; J. Kenny; R. Medhurst; R. Smith	The Rockmelons	6:28
5.	"Love's Gonna Bring You Home" (featuring Doug Williams)	B. Jones; J. Jones; R. Medhurst	The Rockmelons	5:56
6.	"Rain" (featuring (uncredited vocals by) Johanna Pigott)	B. Jones; J. Jones; R. Medhurst	Robin Smith	4:08
7.	"More Tales of the City" (featuring Doug Williams)	Marvin Gaye; B. Jones; J. Jones; R. Medhurst	The Rockmelons	4:35
8.	"Dance Floor" (featuring Doug Williams)	B. Jones; J. Jones; R. Medhurst	The Rockmelons	4:19
9.	"Ain't No Sunshine" (featuring Deni Hines)	Bill Withers	The Rockmelons	3:17
10.	"Bubble and Squeak" (featuring (uncredited vocals by) Kye)	B. Jones; J. Jones; R. Medhurst	The Rockmelons	3:53

- NB: "Form One Planet" contains an excerpt from "Power to the People" by John Lennon.

== Personnel ==
Credited to:

Rockmelons

- Raymond Medhurst – keyboards
- Byron Jones – keyboards, bass guitar, vocals
- Jonathon Jones – keyboards, guitar, drums
- John Kenny – vocals
- Doug Williams – vocals
- Deni Hines – vocals

== Charts ==
=== Weekly charts ===
Chart (1992)	Peak position
Australian Albums (ARIA)	3

=== Year-end charts ===
Chart (1992)	Position
Australian Albums Chart	21
Australian Artist Albums Chart	6

== Certifications ==
Region	Certification	Certified units/sales
Australia (ARIA)	Platinum	70,000^{^}
^{^} Shipments figures based on certification alone.
