= It's Not Over (Rockmelons song) =

Single by Rockmelons featuring Deni Hines

from the album Form 1 Planet
- Released: August 1992
- Genre: Synth-pop
- Length: 4:05 (radio edit)
- Label: Festival Mushroom Records
- Songwriters: Bryon Jones, John Kenny
- Producer: The Rockmelons

Rockmelons singles chronology
"That Word (L.O.V.E.)" (1992)	"It's Not Over" (1992)	"Form One Planet (Power to the People)" (1993)

Deni Hines singles chronology
"That Word (L.O.V.E.)" (1992)	"It's Not Over" (1992)	"It's Alright" (1995)

"It's Not Over" is a song by Australian pop group the Rockmelons featuring Deni Hines. The song was released in August 1992 as the third single from their second studio album, Form 1 Planet (1992). The single peaked at number 15 in Australia, becoming the group's third consecutive top 20 single.

== Track listings ==
CD single (D16037)

1. "It's Not Over" (radio edit) - 4:05
2. "What's It Gonna Be" - 4:45
3. "It's Not Over" (accapella) - 6:25

Vinyl (X 14397)

- A1 "It's Not Over"
- A2 "It's Not Over" (radio edit)
- A3 "It's Not Over" (accapella)
- B1 "Love's Gonna Bring You Home" (club edit)
- B2 "Love's Gonna Bring You Home" (dub)
- B3 "Love's Gonna Bring You Home" (instrumental)

== Weekly charts ==
Chart (1992)	Peak position
Australia (ARIA)	15
New Zealand (Recorded Music NZ)	17
