= Beautiful (Disco Montego song) =

2002 single by Disco Montego

Single by Disco Montego featuring Katie Underwood

from the album Disco Montego
- Released: 6 May 2002
- Length: 3:42
- Label: Bomb; WEA
- Songwriters: Dennis Dowlut; Darren Dowlut; Katie Underwood
- Producers: Kaylan; Michael Szumowski

Disco Montego singles chronology
| "We Got Love" (2001) | "Beautiful" (2002) | "Magic" (2002) |

Katie Underwood singles chronology
| "Don't Be Afraid" (1999) | "Beautiful" (2002) | "Magic" (2002) |

"Beautiful" is a song by Australian musical duo Disco Montego featuring guest vocals by Australian singer-songwriter Katie Underwood. It was released as the second single from the duo's second studio album, Disco Montego (2002), on 6 May 2002. The song reached No. 9 on the Australian ARIA Singles Chart and was certified gold. "Beautiful" was nominated for "Best Pop Release" at the 2002 ARIA Music Awards but lost to Kylie Minogue's Fever. The Michael Spiccia and Prodigy Films direct video was nominated for Best Video.

== Track listing ==
Australian CD single

1. "Beautiful" (radio edit) – 3:42
2. "Beautiful" (Thruster mix) – 6:24
3. "Beautiful" (T Vass Latin club mix) – 7:15
4. "Beautiful" (Studio 347 mix) – 5:51
5. "Beautiful" (James Ash mix) – 6:02

== Charts ==
=== Weekly charts ===
| Chart (2002–2003) | Peak position |
|---|---|
| Australia (ARIA) | 9 |
| Australian Club Chart (ARIA) | 1 |
| Australian Dance (ARIA) | 1 |
| Poland (Polish Airplay Chart) | 24 |

=== Year-end charts ===
| Chart (2002) | Position |
|---|---|
| Australia (ARIA) | 67 |
| Australian Club Chart (ARIA) | 17 |
| Australian Dance (ARIA) | 10 |

== Certifications ==
| Region | Certification | Certified units/sales |
|---|---|---|
| Australia (ARIA) | Gold | 35,000^{^} |
^{^} Shipments figures based on certification alone.
