= Magic (Disco Montego song) =

2002 single by Disco Montego

Single by Disco Montego featuring Katie Underwood

from the album Disco Montego
- Released: 12 August 2002
- Length: 3:53
- Label: Bomb, WEA
- Songwriter(s): Dennis Dowlut, Darren Dowlut, Katie Underwood, Michael Szumowski
- Producer(s): Disco Montego, Michael Szumowski

Disco Montego singles chronology
"Beautiful" (2002)	"Magic" (2002)	"Good Times" (2002)

Katie Underwood singles chronology
"Beautiful" (2002)	"Magic" (2002)	"Good Times" (2002)

"Magic" is a song by Australian musical duo Disco Montego featuring guest vocals from Australian singer-songwriter Katie Underwood. It was released as the third single from the duo's second album, Disco Montego (2002), on 12 August 2002. The song reached No. 22 on the Australian ARIA Singles Chart that September.

== Track listing ==
Australian CD single

1. "Magic"
2. "Magic" (Thruster Spell remix)
3. "Magic" (Funk Corporation's Sleight of Hand club mix)
4. "Beautiful" (Disco Montego remix)

== Charts ==
Chart (2002)	Peak position
Australia (ARIA)	22
