= A Matter of Time (Bec Cartwright song) =

Single by Bec Cartwright

from the album Bec Cartwright
- Released: 25 August 2003
- Recorded: 2003
- Genre: Pop
- Length: 3:30
- Label: Warner Music
- Songwriter(s): Matthew Gerrard, Christopher Ward
- Producer(s): Tony Cvetkovski

Bec Cartwright singles chronology
"On the Borderline" (2003)	"A Matter of Time" (2003)

"A Matter of Time" is the third and final single from Bec Cartwright's eponymous debut album. The song peaked at #26 on the Australian Singles Chart.

== Track listing ==
1. "A Matter of Time" (radio mix) - 3:30
2. "A Matter of Time" (Quazimodo Rolex 12-inch remix) - 5:14
3. "A Matter of Time" (karaoke mix) - 3:22
4. "All Seats Taken" (music video)
5. "On the Borderline" (music video)

== Charts ==
Chart (2003)	Peak position
Australia (ARIA)	26
