= Risqué (album) =

Studio album by Chic
- Released: July 30, 1979
- Recorded: 1978–1979
- Studios: Power Station, New York City
- Genres: Disco; soul; funk
- Length: 36:46
- Label: Atlantic
- Producers: Nile Rodgers; Bernard Edwards

Chic chronology
| C'est Chic (1978) | Risqué (1979) | Les Plus Grands Succès De Chic: Chic's Greatest Hits (1979) |

Singles from Risqué
- 1. "Good Times" Released: June 1979; 2. "My Forbidden Lover" Released: September 1979; 3. "My Feet Keep Dancing" Released: December 1979

Risqué is the third studio album by American disco band Chic, released on Atlantic Records on July 30, 1979. One of the records that defined the disco era, the album became highly influential not only within the movement, but also in other styles such as hip hop, art rock and new wave. In 2020, Rolling Stone ranked the album at number 414 on their list of the 500 Greatest Albums of All Time.

== Release ==
Risqué includes three classic Chic hits; "Good Times" (#1 US Pop, #1 US R&B June 23, 1979, #5 UK), "My Forbidden Lover" (#33 US R&B, #43 US Pop October 13, 1979, #15 UK) and "My Feet Keep Dancing" (#42 US R&B, #101 US Pop December 8, 1979, #21 UK). Risqué reached #5 on the US albums chart and #2 on the US R&B chart. It has been certified Platinum by the RIAA for sales over 1 million copies. It peaked at #29 in the UK and was certified Silver by the BPI.

Risqué was released on compact disc by Atlantic Records/Warner Music in 1991 (catalogue number 7567-80406-2). The album was digitally remastered and re-issued by Warner Music Japan in 2011.

== Critical reception ==
Professional ratings
Review scores
| Source | Rating |
|---|---|
| AllMusic | 4.5/5 stars |
| Christgau's Record Guide | A− |
| The Encyclopedia of Popular Music | 4/5 stars |
| Mojo | 5/5 stars |
| MusicHound Rock: The Essential Album Guide | 3.5/5 stars |
| Pitchfork | 9.4/10 |
| The Rolling Stone Album Guide | 4/5 stars |
| Smash Hits | 8½/10 |
| Sounds | 4/5 stars |
| Spin Alternative Record Guide | 9/10 |

Risqué received widespread critical acclaim for its lyrics and tone. The Bay State Banner wrote that "one hears lyrics that are sometimes almost indictments and other times reflective... The beat is more aggressive, the sound tougher and the vocals—while still repetitive and delivered flatly—are arranged and produced so that they demand attention and focus in quickly on a song's sentiments."

In a review for BBC, Daryl Easlea called the album "one of the greatest exhibits in the case for disco's defence," and saying that it was "Chic's most sustained artistic statement, a celebration of a 70s that was collapsing under its own excess and hedonism."

== Legacy ==
"Good Times" has been extensively sampled in other artists' works, most notably in the first top 40 rap single, "Rapper's Delight" by Sugarhill Gang, that same year. "Will You Cry" was sampled in "Just a Moment" by Nas from the 2004 album Street's Disciple.

=== Accolades ===
| Publication | Country | Accolade | Year | Rank |
|---|---|---|---|---|
| Blender | United States | The 100 Greatest American Albums of All time | 2008 | 36 |
| Dave Marsh and Kevin Stein | United States | Top 40 Chartmakers - 1979 | 1981 | 7 |
| Robert Dimery | United States | 1001 Albums You Must Hear Before You Die | 2005 | * |
| Rolling Stone | United States | The Essential Rock Collection | 1997 | * |
| Rolling Stone | United States | The 500 Greatest Albums of All Time | 2020 | 414 |
| The Guardian | United Kingdom | Alternative Top 100 | 1999 | 34 |
| The Guardian | United Kingdom | 1000 Albums to Hear Before You Die | 2007 | * |
| The Guardian | United Kingdom | My Favourite Album Series | 2011 | * |
| The Guardian | United Kingdom | Guardian Writers' Favourite Albums Ever | 2013 | * |
| Mojo | United Kingdom | Mojo 1000, the Ultimate CD Buyers Guide | 2001 | * |
| Mojo | United Kingdom | The Mojo Collection | 2003 | * |
| Paul Morley | United Kingdom | 100 Greatest Albums of All Time | 2003 | * |
| NME | United Kingdom | Albums of the Year | 2016 | 23 |
| NME | United Kingdom | NME's The 500 Greatest Albums of All Time | 2013 | 208 |
| Q | United Kingdom | The 50 Best Albums of the 70s | 1998 | 45 |
| The Rough Guide | United Kingdom | Soul: 100 Essential CDs | 2000 | * |
| Gilles Verlant | France | 300+ Best Albums in the History of Rock | 2013 | * |
| Les Inrockuptibles | France | 50 Years of Rock'n'Roll | 2004 | * |
| Philippe Manœuvre | France | 100 Necessary Albums | 2014 | * |
| Rock & Folk | France | The 300 Best Albums from 1965-1995 | 1995 | * |
| Rock & Folk | France | The Best Albums from 1963 to 1999 | 1999 | * |
| Rock & Folk | France | 555 Albums from 1954-2014 | 2014 | * |
| Télérama | France | The Best Albums of All Time | 1993 | * |
(*) designates lists that are unordered.

== Track listing ==
All tracks are written by Bernard Edwards and Nile Rodgers.

Side one
| No. | Title | Length |
|---|---|---|
| 1. | "Good Times" | 8:08 |
| 2. | "A Warm Summer Night" | 6:10 |
| 3. | "My Feet Keep Dancing" | 6:38 |

Side two
| No. | Title | Length |
|---|---|---|
| 4. | "My Forbidden Lover" | 4:39 |
| 5. | "Can't Stand to Love You" | 2:56 |
| 6. | "Will You Cry (When You Hear This Song)" | 4:06 |
| 7. | "What About Me?" | 4:09 |

== Personnel ==
- Alfa Anderson – lead vocals (1, 4, 6, 7)
- Luci Martin – lead vocals (1, 3, 4, 5)
- Fonzi Thornton – vocals
- Michelle Cobbs – backing vocals
- Ullanda McCullough – backing vocals
- Raymond Jones – keyboards
- Robert Sabino – keyboards
- Andrew Barrett (Schwartz) – piano
- Nile Rodgers – guitars, vocals
- Bernard Edwards – bass guitar, lead vocals (3)
- Tony Thompson – drums
- Sammy Figueroa – percussion
- Jean Fineberg – saxophones
- Alex Foster – saxophones
- Barry Rogers – trombone
- Jon Faddis – trumpet
- Ellen Seeling – trumpet
- The Chic Strings:
  - Valerie Heywood – strings
  - Cheryl Hong – strings
  - Karen Karlsrud – strings
  - Karen Milne – strings
- Gene Orloff – concertmaster

Tap Dancers on "My Feet Keep Dancing"

- Eugene Jackson
- Fayard Nicholas
- Sammy Warren

== Production ==
- Bernard Edwards – producer for Chic Organization Ltd., arrangements and conductor
- Nile Rodgers – producer for Chic Organization Ltd., arrangements and conductor
- Bob Clearmountain – sound engineer
- Jim Galante – assistant engineer
- Jeff Hendrickson – assistant engineer
- Peter Robbins – assistant engineer
- Jackson Schwartz – assistant engineer
- Raymond Willard – assistant engineer
- Dennis King – mastering
- Carin Goldberg – art direction
- Ken Ambrose – photography
- All songs recorded and mixed at The Power Station (New York, NY)
- Additional recording at Electric Lady Studios (New York, NY) and Kendun Recorders (Burbank, CA)
- Mastered at Atlantic Studios (New York, NY)

== Charts ==
| Chart (1979) | Peak position |
|---|---|
| Australian Albums (Kent Music Report) | 75 |
| Canada Top Albums/CDs (RPM) | 15 |
| Swedish Albums (Sverigetopplistan) | 37 |
| UK Albums (Official Charts) | 29 |
| US Billboard 200 | 5 |
| US Top R&B/Hip-Hop Albums (Billboard) | 2 |

== Certifications ==
| Region | Certification | Certified units/sales |
|---|---|---|
| United Kingdom (BPI) | Silver | 60,000^{^} |
| United States (RIAA) | Platinum | 1,000,000^{^} |
^{^} Shipments figures based on certification alone.
