= All Seats Taken =

2002 single by Bec Cartwright

Single by Bec Cartwright

from the album Bec Cartwright
- Released: 21 October 2002
- Recorded: 2002
- Genre: Pop
- Label: East West Australia
- Songwriter(s): Fredrik Thomander; Anders Wikström
- Producer(s): Tony Cvetkovski

Bec Cartwright singles chronology
"All Seats Taken" (2002)	"On the Borderline" (2003)

"All Seats Taken" is the debut single of Australian actress and singer Bec Cartwright, taken from her first album, Bec Cartwright. The track peaked at number 10 on the Australian Singles Chart in November 2002. The song was originally penned for the female finalists of Popstars 3. However, because none of them won the series, it was given to Cartwright instead.

== Music video ==
The music video was filmed in a former roller skating rink in Petersham, an Inner West suburb of Sydney. The location is now a mixed residential and commercial complex.

== Track listing ==
Australian CD single

1. "All Seats Taken"
2. "All Seats Taken" (Fat Head remix)
3. "All Seats Taken" (extended mix)
4. "All Seats Taken" (karaoke)

== Charts ==
=== Weekly charts ===
Chart (2002–2003)	Peak position
Australia (ARIA)	10

=== Year-end charts ===
Chart (2002)	Position
Australia (ARIA)	74
Australian Artists (ARIA)	16

== Certification ==
Region	Certification	Certified units/sales
Australia (ARIA)	Gold	35,000^{^}
^{^} Shipments figures based on certification alone.
