= That Word (L.O.V.E.) =

1992 single by Rockmelons

Single by Rockmelons featuring Deni Hines

from the album Form 1 Planet
- Released: 13 April 1992
- Length: 3:51
- Label: Mushroom
- Songwriters: Rashad Smith; Bryon Jones; Jonathan Jones; Raymond Medhurst
- Producers: Donovan Germain; Rockmelons

Rockmelons singles chronology
"Ain't No Sunshine" (1991)	"That Word (L.O.V.E.)" (1992)	"It's Not Over" (1992)

"That Word (L.O.V.E.)" is a song by Australian pop group Rockmelons featuring Deni Hines. It was written by group member Bryon Jones, his brother Jonathan Jones, and Raymond Medhurst with Rashad Smith. It was released in April 1992 as the second single from their second studio album, Form 1 Planet (1992). The single peaked at number four on the Australian Singles Chart and number five on the New Zealand Singles Chart, giving the group their highest-charting single in both countries.

== Background ==
In 1991, Rockmelons were joined by the song's lead vocalist, Deni Hines, to record three tracks for their second studio album, Form 1 Planet (1992). The group's line-up was Bryon Jones on keyboards, bass guitar and backing vocals; his brother Jonathon Jones on keyboards, guitar and drums; and Raymond Medhurst on keyboards.

"That Word (L.O.V.E)" was their second single with Hines and was released in April 1992. It was co-written by the group's members with Rashad Smith, and co-produced by Donovan Germain and the band. It peaked at number four on the Australian Singles Chart and number five on the New Zealand Singles Chart, which are the group's highest positions in each market.

== Track listings ==
All tracks were written by Rashad Smith, Bryon Jones, Jonathan Jones, and Raymond Medhurst.

7-inch single

1. "That Word (L.O.V.E.)" – 3:51
2. "That Word (L.O.V.E.)" (extended toasted mix) – 4:39

CD and 12-inch single

1. "That Word (L.O.V.E.)" – 3:51
2. "That Word (L.O.V.E.)" (extended toasted mix) – 4:39
3. "That Word (L.O.V.E.)" (Penthouse of Joy mix) – 4:28

UK maxi-CD

1. "That Word (L.O.V.E.)" (toasted) – 4:11
2. "That Word (L.O.V.E.)" (untoasted) – 3:52
3. "That Word (L.O.V.E.)" (New York radio mix) – 4:16
4. "That Word (L.O.V.E.)" (Mafia & Fluxy mix) – 4:12

== Charts ==
=== Weekly charts ===
Chart (1992)	Peak position
Australia (ARIA)	4
New Zealand (Recorded Music NZ)	5

=== Year-end charts ===
Chart (1992)	Position
Australia (ARIA)	26
New Zealand (RIANZ)	13

== Certifications ==
Region	Certification	Certified units/sales
Australia (ARIA)	Gold	35,000^{^}
New Zealand (RMNZ)	Gold	5,000^{*}
^{*} Sales figures based on certification alone.^{^} Shipments figures based on certification alone.

== Release history ==
Region	Date	Format(s)	Label(s)	Ref.
Australia	13 April 1992	12-inch vinyl; CD; cassette	Mushroom	
Australia	8 June 1992	7-inch vinyl	Mushroom	
United Kingdom	19 September 1994	7-inch vinyl; 12-inch vinyl; CD; cassette	Mushroom	
