= Meant to Be (Selwyn album) =

Studio album by Selwyn
- Released: 30 August 2002
- Recorded: 2001–2002
- Genre: R&B; pop
- Length: 53:06
- Label: Sony BMG
- Producer: Audius Mtawarira; Paul Begaud; Rudy; Tod Deeley

Selwyn chronology
Meant to Be (2002)	One Way (2004)

Meant to Be is the 2002 debut studio album from Australian R&B singer Selwyn. It was released in Australia, the United States, and South Africa. The album spawned three top 20 singles on the ARIA charts, those being "Buggin' Me", a cover of Hall & Oates' "Rich Girl", and "Way Love's Supposed to Be". The album peaked at number 9 on the ARIA Albums Chart.

== Track listing ==
=== Disc 1 ===
All tracks written by Audius Mtawarira and Selwyn Pretorius except where noted.

1. "Intro" – 0:29
2. "Buggin' Me" – 3:31
3. "She Said" – 3:49
4. "My Thang" – 3:49
5. "Way Love's Supposed to Be" (Mtawarira/Pretorius/Paul Begaud) – 4:24
6. "Negative Things" (Audius Mtawarira) – 4:31
7. "Rich Girl" (Daryl Hall) – 3:58
8. "Like This, Like That" – 3:35
9. "Take My Time" – 4:29
10. "Way You Make Me Feel" (Mtawarira/Pretorius/Paul Begaud) – 5:15
11. "AM Call" (Audius Mtawarira) – 4:00
12. "Tell Me What You Like / Funky Cold Medina / Thank You" – 11:16

=== Disc 2 (Bonus edition) ===
1. "Rich Girl" (Rudy Remix) – 3:27
2. "Buggin' Me" (Hype Music Extended Mix) – 3:47
3. "Way Love's Supposed to Be" (Bsyde West Coast Mix) – 4:21
4. "Your Booty Is Buggin' Me" (U.W.M.S.C. Mix) – 4:02
5. "Rich Girl" (Anna Nicole Mix) – 3:38
6. "Way Love's Supposed to Be" (Isaac James Edit) – 3:49
7. "Rich Girl" (K-Warren 12") – 5:34
8. "Way Love's Supposed to Be" (By the Way) – 3:58
9. Multimedia (3 videos, 4 biographies and "On the Road" home movie)

== Charts ==
Chart (2002)	Peak position
Australian Albums (ARIA)	9

== Certifications ==
Region	Certification	Certified units/sales
Australia (ARIA)	Gold	35,000^{^}
^{^} Shipments figures based on certification alone.
