= Now 05 (Australian series) =

Compilation album by Various artists
- Released: 15 March 2004
- Label: EMI

Australian series chronology
Now 04 (2003)	Now 05 (2004)	Now 06 (2004)

Now 05 is a compilation album released by EMI Music Australia and Warner Music Australia in 2004.

== Track listing ==
1. Kelis – "Milkshake" (3:08)
2. Kylie Minogue – "Slow" (3:15)
3. Jamelia – "Superstar" (3:36)
4. Kevin Lyttle – "Turn Me On" (3:21)
5. Hilary Duff – "So Yesterday" (3:36)
6. Fabolous featuring Tamia – "Into You" (4:55)
7. Chingy featuring Ludacris and Snoop Dogg – "Holidae In" (4:33)
8. Atomic Kitten featuring Kool & the Gang – "Ladies Night" (3:07)
9. Boogie Pimps – "Somebody to Love" (Saltshaker Remix) (3:00)
10. J-Wess – "What Chu Want" (3:48)
11. Sean Paul – "Like Glue" (3:55)
12. Missy Elliott – "Pass That Dutch" (3:42)
13. Basement Jaxx featuring Lisa Kekaula – "Good Luck" (4:28)
14. Jet – "Are You Gonna Be My Girl" (3:37)
15. Jewel – "Stand" (3:13)
16. Michelle Branch – "Breathe" (3:34)
17. Robbie Williams – "Sexed Up" (4:23)
18. Matchbox Twenty – "Bright Lights" (3:56)
19. Solitaire – "I Like Love (I Love Love)" (3:48)
20. Linus Loves featuring Sam Obernik – "Stand Back" (3:23)
21. Tom Novy featuring Lima – "Without Your Love" (3:43)

== Charts ==
Year	Chart	Peak position
2004	ARIA Compilations Chart	1

== Certifications ==
Region	Certification	Certified units/sales
Australia (ARIA)	Platinum	70,000^{^}
^{^} Shipments figures based on certification alone.
