= Selwyn (singer) =

Australian singer

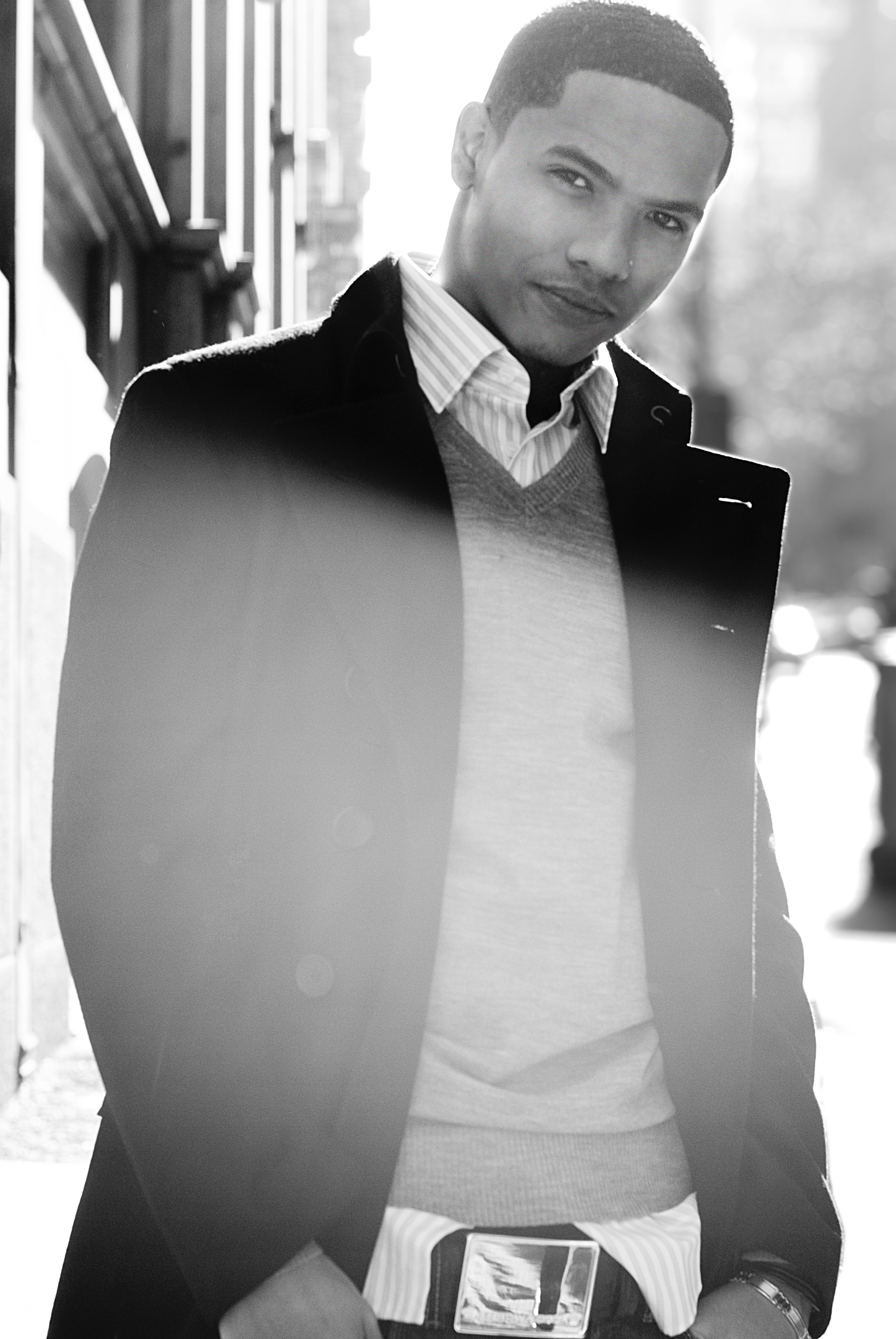

Background information
- Born: Perth, Western Australia
- Origin: Sydney, Australia
- Genres: Pop, R&B
- Years active: 1998–2017
- Labels: Sony BMG (2001–2004), Epic

Selwyn (born Selwyn Pretorius, 1982, in Durban, South Africa) is an R&B singer from Perth, Western Australia. He was a contestant on the Australian reality series Popstars 2, but did not make it through to the final group lineup. He was re-discovered while working at a shopping centre as a trolley boy. Producer Audius Mtawarira overheard him singing and offered to produce him.

== Career ==
In August 2004, Selwyn released "Boomin'". It was written by Paul Rein for Selwyn's second studio album, One Way. Australian singer Israel contributed to the production of the song, which according to Kathy McCabe of The Daily Telegraph is "beefed-up". Selwyn described it as a "different track" with a "different feel". It was promoted through the clothing store Jay Jays, where customers would receive a physical copy of the single after spending $40 at the store. For the week of 19 August 2004, "Boomin'" was the third-most added track to the playlists of Australian radio stations. It entered the Australian Singles Chart at No.28 and spent six weeks within the chart.

== Discography ==
=== Albums ===
List of albums, with selected details, chart positions and certifications
Title	Details	Peak positions	Certifications (thresholds)
Title	Details	AUS	Certifications (thresholds)
Meant to Be	Released: 30 August 2002; Label: Epic (508361200); Format: CD, cassette	7	ARIA: Gold
One Way	Released: 25 July 2004; Label: Epic (517640200); Format: CD, cassette	—	

=== Singles ===
List of singles, with selected chart positions and certifications
Title	Year	Peak positions	Certifications	Album
Title	Year	AUS	Certifications	Album
"Buggin' Me"	2001	19	ARIA: Gold	Meant to Be
"Way Love's Supposed to Be"	2002	9	ARIA: Gold	Meant to Be
"Rich Girl"	2002	9	ARIA: Gold	Meant to Be
"Like This, Like That"	2002	44		Meant to Be
"Good Times" (with Disco Montego) (featuring Katie Underwood, Peta Morris and Jeremy Gregory)	2002	52		single only
"Boomin'"	2004	28		One Way
"Satisfactual"	2004	—		One Way
