= It Could Be Yours =

It Could Be Yours may refer to:

- "It Could Be Yours", a 2003 song by Blackmail from the album Friend or Foe?
- "It Could Be Yours", a 2005 song by the Bratz Rock Angelz from the album Rock Angelz
