= U Talkin' to Me =

2002 single by Disco Montego

Single by Disco Montego

from the album Disco Montego
- Released: 2 December 2002
- Length: 3:52
- Label: Bomb; WEA
- Songwriters: Dennis Dowlut; Darren Dowlut; Robert Woolf
- Producer: Disco Montego

Disco Montego singles chronology
"Good Times" (2002)	"U Talkin' to Me" (2002)	"Hearts on Fire" (2010)

"U Talkin' to Me" is a song by Australian dance music duo Disco Montego. It was released on 2 December 2002 as the fourth and final single from their second studio album, Disco Montego (2002). "U Talkin' to Me" peaked at number 17 on the Australian ARIA Singles Chart. The song won an Australasian Performing Right Association (APRA) Award for Most Performed Dance Work during 2003 at the APRA Awards of 2004.

== Track listing ==
Australian CD single

1. "U Talkin' to Me" – 3:46
2. "U Talkin' to Me" (JP's Cheap Talkin' mix) – 5:00
3. "U Talkin' to Me" (Mark John vs On the 1 & 2's Quazimodo 12-inch ride) – 6:00
4. "U Talkin' to Me" (a cappella) – 3:46

== Charts ==
=== Weekly charts ===
Chart (2003)	Peak position
Australia (ARIA)	17
Australian Dance (ARIA)	2

=== Year-end charts ===
Chart (2003)	Position
Australian Dance (ARIA)	9
