= Bec Hewitt =

Australian actress, television presenter and singer (born 1983)

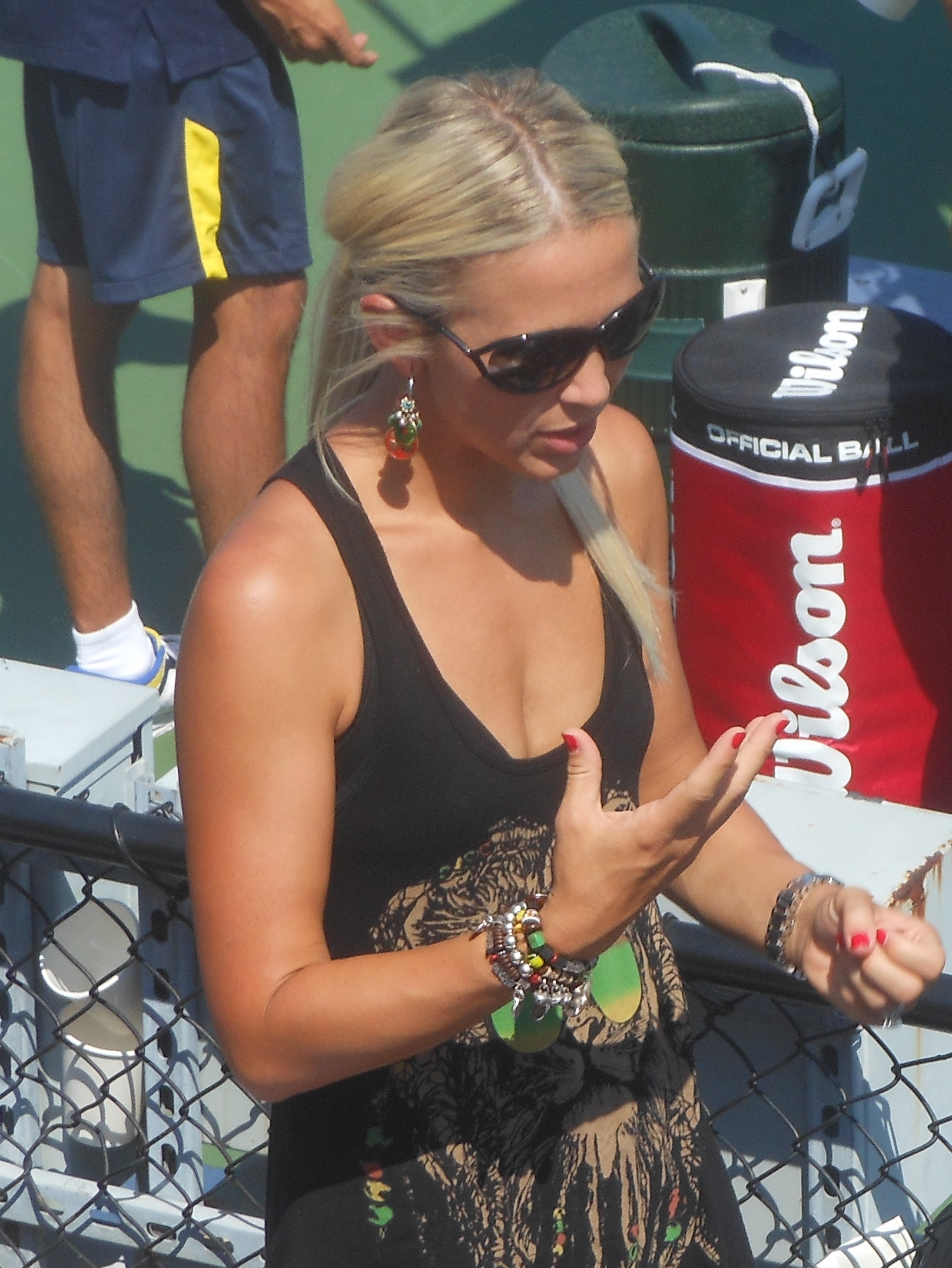
- Cartwright in 2012
- Born: Rebecca June Cartwright; 23 July 1983 (age 43); Sydney, New South Wales, Australia
- Other name: Bec Cartwright
- Occupations: Actress; television presenter; singer
- Years active: 1988–2006; 2018–present
- Spouse: Lleyton Hewitt (m. 2005)
- Children: 3, including Cruz
- Relatives: Jaslyn Hewitt-Shehadie (sister-in-law); Glynn Hewitt (father-in-law)
- Musical career
- Genres: Pop; power pop
- Label: Warner Music Australia

Rebecca June Hewitt (née Cartwright; born 23 July 1983) is an Australian actress, television presenter and singer. From 1998 to 2005, Hewitt played Hayley Smith Lawson on the soap opera Home and Away. As Bec Cartwright, Hewitt released an eponymous pop music album in 2002. In 2005, she married professional tennis player Lleyton Hewitt.

== Career ==
Cartwright began her acting career at age 5 for television commercials. In 1992, she made her mainstream television debut on an episode of Police Rescue. She has also guest starred in Water Rats and Roar.

She won her breakout role and best-known role to date in 1998, portraying Hayley Smith Lawson on Home and Away. Cartwright became a series fan favourite and earned herself numerous Logie Award nominations until 2005. In the same year, Cartwright earned a Most Popular Actress win. She coincidentally fell pregnant within months of her 'Home and Away' character, and then left the series to become a full-time mother. For a short period of time, Ella Scott Lynch replaced her as Hayley before the character departed the series in the 2005 season finale.

In 2002, Cartwright signed a recording contract with Warner Music Australia and East West Records. Her debut single "All Seats Taken" was released 18 November 2002 and peaked at 10 on the ARIA Music Charts. Her follow-up singles "On the Borderline" and "A Matter of Time" both failed to match the same success, both charting only the Top 30. Her self-titled debut album was released on 16 June 2003 and, despite high expectations, charted only at 21 and was certified Gold. The album was met with mixed reviews, with Smash Hits giving the album two out of five stars. In 2004, Cartwright ended her partnership with Warner Music.

Cartwright was announced as a contestant in the first season of Dancing with the Stars. She and her partner Michael Miziner won the first season on 23 November 2004. The couple returned in an opening performance in a dance routine during the second-season premiere.

She hosted Abba Mania, which premiered in November 2006 on Nine Network. The special was met with controversy surrounding the fact that the only celebrity performers were Nine Network personalities. Hewitt's performance was met with largely negative reviews.

In 2018, Hewitt announced her return to television, 13 years since she left Home and Away, with the new Nine Network travel series Helloworld for the first two seasons. The series premiered on 7 October with Hewitt hosting in Episode 1 in Queensland – Hamilton Island.

== Personal life ==
Cartwright was born in Sydney on 23 July 1983, the youngest child of Darrel and Michelle Cartwright. She has an older brother and sister.

After a four-year relationship with fellow Home and Away co-star Beau Brady, Cartwright and Brady were briefly engaged.

Soon after the end of her engagement, Cartwright began a relationship with tennis player Lleyton Hewitt. On 5 May 2005, the couple announced they were expecting their first child. The pair married on 21 July 2005; the wedding was at the Sydney Opera House, and their reception took place at Taronga Zoo. The event attracted much media attention, with Bec and Lleyton selling exclusive coverage of the day to magazine New Idea. Fellow actresses and friends Ada Nicodemou and Kate Ritchie were bridesmaids. Commemorative stubby holders were given as gifts to all guests.

On 29 November 2005, Cartwright gave birth to a daughter at Sydney's North Shore Private Hospital. Before her birth, a contract was made with women's magazine Woman's Day involving regular diaries from Bec and exclusive photos and interviews of the family for the first two years of Mia's life. The couple attracted much criticism for the observation that they had effectively "sold" their daughter to the highest bidder. On 11 December 2008, Hewitt gave birth to a baby boy whom the couple named Cruz Lleyton Hewitt. Their third child, a daughter, was born on 19 October 2010.

In February 2009, after revelations about Hewitt's previously unknown offshore income and bank accounts were revealed during a legal battle with his former management company, Octagon Sports Marketing, the couple relocated to a $3.8 million home at the Old Fort Bay estate in Nassau, Bahamas.

== Filmography ==
=== Television ===
Year	Title	Role	Notes
1992	Police Rescue	Emma	Season 2, episode 9
1997	Water Rats	School Girl	Season 2, episode 8
1997	Roar	Young Caitlin	Season 1, episode 9
1998–2005	Home and Away	Hayley Smith / Hayley Lawson	Season 11–18 (main role)
2002	Home and Away: Secrets and the City	Hayley Smith / Hayley Lawson	Video special
2004; 2021	Dancing with the Stars	Contestant	Season 1 (winner); season 18
2004	Home and Away: Hearts Divided	Host	Video special
2005	Home and Away: Romances	Herself	Video special
2018	Endless Summer: 30 Years of Home and Away	Herself	TV special
2018	Helloworld	Presenter	Season 1, episode 1
2022	This Is Your Life: Ray Meagher	Herself	11 October 2022
2023	Time & Place	Kylie	TV series

=== Film ===
Year	Title	Role	Notes
2024	13th Summer	Kate Robinson	Film

== Discography ==
=== Albums ===
List of studio albums
Title	album details	Peak chart positions
Title	album details	AUS
Bec Cartwright	Released 16 June 2003; Label: East West Records (2564604002); Formats: Compact Disc, streaming	21

=== Singles ===
Year	Song	Peak Positions	Certifications	Album
Year	Song	AUS	Certifications	Album
2002	"All Seats Taken"	10	ARIA: Gold	Bec Cartwright
2003	"On the Borderline"	29		Bec Cartwright
2003	"A Matter of Time"	26		Bec Cartwright

== Awards and nominations ==
Year	Award	Category	Work	Result	Ref.
2001	Logie Awards	Most Popular Actress	Home and Away (Season 13)	Nominated	
2004	Logie Awards	Most Popular Actress	Home and Away (Season 16)	Nominated	
2005	Logie Awards	Most Popular Actress	Home and Away (Season 17)	Won	
2005	Logie Awards	Most Popular Personality on Australian Television	Home and Away (Season 17)	Nominated	
2006	Logie Awards	Most Popular Actress	Home and Away (Season 18)	Nominated	
2006	Logie Awards	Most Popular Personality on Australian Television	Home and Away (Season 18)	Nominated	

Preceded by N/A	Dancing with the Stars (Australia) winner Season 1 (Late 2004 with Michael Miziner)	Succeeded by Tom Williams & Kym Johnson
