= Rockmelons =

Australian musical group

- Also known as: Rockies
- Origin: Sydney, Australia
- Genres: Pop, electronic, R&B
- Years active: 1983–2002
- Labels: Phantom, Festival, True Tone, Mushroom
- Past members: Raymond Medhurst; Bryon Jones; Jonathon Jones

Rockmelons, often referred to as the Rockies, were an Australian pop/dance/R&B group formed in 1983 in Sydney. Primary members are Bryon Jones, his brother Jonathon Jones and Raymond Medhurst. They had two Australian top five hit singles in the early 1990s with "Ain't No Sunshine" and "That Word (L.O.V.E.)", both sung by Deni Hines. The associated album, Form 1 Planet, peaked at number 3 on the ARIA albums chart in 1992, and was certified platinum in Australia.

== Career ==
=== 1983–1986: Formation and early singles ===
The group concept was formed in 1983 at a warehouse party in Sydney when Raymond Medhurst (keyboards) wanted a band to perform for a private party. He contacted the Jones brothers Bryon (keyboards, bass guitar, backing vocals) and Jonathon (keyboards, guitar, drums) and Medhurst's schoolmate, Vincent Dale (keyboards) to join.

Sandi Chick (lead vocals) and Peter Kennard (guitar, percussion) entered in late 1983 and were followed closely by Geoffrey Stapleton (keyboards, guitar, percussion) (later in GANGgajang) in early 1984. Stapleton had worked with the Jones brothers when they were in Les Ukeleles and No Heavy Lifting by recording their songs. Vocalists Peter Blakeley and John Kenny (known to Stapleton in Adelaide) were brought in and with Stephen Allkins (operated turntables at gigs) made them a ten-piece.

The group's first single, "Time Out (For Serious Fun)", was released on Phantom Records on 4 February 1985 with lead vocals by Chick. A second single, "Sweat It Out" was released in September of the same year with vocals by Blakeley. Chick and Stapleton left that year.

=== 1987–1990: Tales of the City ===
1987 saw the arrival of Mary Azzopardi (backing vocals) and Wendy Matthews (vocals). The pattern of using different vocalists continued during the recording of their debut album. In June 1987, the group released "Rhymes", a cover of a 1974 song by Al Green with vocals by John Kenny. In November 1987, the group released "New Groove", which was followed by "What's It Gonna Be" in February 1988. All three singles peaked inside the Australian top 50. The album Tales of the City was released in May 1988 and peaked at number 9 on the Australian charts. Three further singles were released from the album in 1988.

At the ARIA Music Awards of 1989, Rockmelons shared the ARIA Award for Breakthrough Artist – Album with 1927's album ...ish. The album peaked at number 6 on the Australian charts.

By 1990 the Rockmelons were down to Medhurst and the Jones brothers after all others including founding member Dale had left.

=== 1991–2000: Form 1 Planet ===
In 1991, Rockmelons recruited vocalist Deni Hines and recorded their cover of Bill Withers' "Ain't No Sunshine", which reached number 5 in Australia in January 1992, and was certified gold. Their follow-up single "That Word (L.O.V.E.)" (written by B. Jones, J. Jones, Medhurst and Robin Smith) reached number 4 in Australia, and was also certified gold. By 1992, Doug Williams had joined as a vocalist whilst Hines left to have success as a solo artist, with the "It's Alright" single (1995) peaking at #4 in Australia. Rockmelons were nominated for ARIA Album of the Year award in 1993 for Form 1 Planet, which peaked at number 3 in Australia in August 1992 and was certified platinum by ARIA.

=== 2001–2005: Rockies 3 ===
Rockmelons' third album, Rockies 3 was released in October 2002. Rockmelons used eight different vocalists on the album. The Jeremy Gregory lead single "All I Want Is You" was nominated for 2003 APRA Most Performed Dance Work. Other vocalist were: Roxane LeBrasse, Darren Paul, Doug Williams, Emma Morton, Sydney Bouchaniche, and Evelyn Rubuen.

== Producers ==
Collectively, the trio of Medhurst, B. Jones and J. Jones (as Rockmelons) have produced (or co-produced): Time of Our Lives for Marcia Hines, "Hook Me Up" and "Let it Whip" for CDB, No Commandments for Kaylan, and two tracks for Disco Montego for Disco Montego (aka Kaylan). The Rockmelons have also produced music for Sophie Monk.

Bryon Jones, also known as Bry Jones, has worked as a producer for artists, especially Australian Idol contestants including Guy Sebastian, Shannon Noll, Anthony Callea, Casey Donovan, Jessica Mauboy, Damien Leith, Kate DeAraugo, Stan Walker, and Wes Carr. He has also produced The Voice artists Rachael Leahcar, Harrison Craig, and Fatai; and The X Factor artist Jason Owen. Bryon also produced the music and soundtrack for the Australian movie The Sapphires, featuring Jessica Mauboy.

Jonathon Jones remixed "Love & Glory" for Tina Harrod.

== Discography ==
=== Studio albums ===
List of albums, with selected chart positions
Title	Album details	Peak chart positions		Certifications (sales thresholds)
Title	Album details	AUS	NZ	Certifications (sales thresholds)
Tales of the City	Released: May 1988; Label: True Tone/Polygram; Formats: CD, cassette	6	—	
Form 1 Planet	Released: July 1992; Label: Mushroom; Formats: CD, cassette	3	14	ARIA: Platinum
Rockies 3	Released: October 2002; Label: Festival; Formats: CD	208	—	
"—" denotes releases that did not chart.

=== Compilation albums ===
List of compilation albums, with selected details
Title	Details
Serious Fun: Tales of the Rockmelons (1985–2002)	Released: November 2015; Label: The Rockmelons; Formats: CD, digital download

=== Singles ===
Year	Title	Lead vocalist	Peak chart positions			Album
Year	Title	Lead vocalist	AUS	NZ	UK	Album
1985	"Time Out (For Serious Fun)"	Sandi Chick	81	—	—	Singles only
1985	"Sweat It Out"	Peter Blakeley	—	—	—	Singles only
1987	"Rhymes"	John Kenny	26	—	—	Tales of the City
1987	"New Groove"	John Kenny	21	—	—	Tales of the City
1988	"What's It Gonna Be"	John Kenny	41	—	—	Tales of the City
1988	"Thief"/"Boogietron"	John Kenny	81	—	—	Tales of the City
1988	"Jump" (As Rockmelons featuring Wendy Matthews)	Wendy Matthews	78	—	—	Tales of the City
1991	"Ain't No Sunshine" (As Rockmelons featuring Deni Hines)	Deni Hines	5	8	—	Form 1 Planet
1992	"That Word (L.O.V.E.)" (As Rockmelons featuring Deni Hines)	Deni Hines	4	5	90	Form 1 Planet
1992	"It's Not Over" (As Rockmelons featuring Deni Hines)	Deni Hines	15	17	—	Form 1 Planet
1993	"Form One Planet (Power to the People)" (As Rockmelons featuring Eric Sebastian)	Eric Sebastian	73	—	—	Form 1 Planet
1994	"Stronger Together"	Doug Williams	96	—	80	Form 1 Planet
1994	"Love's Gonna Bring You Home" (As Rockmelons featuring Doug Williams)	Doug Williams	promo	promo	—	Form 1 Planet
2002	"All I Want Is You" (As Rockmelons featuring Jeremy)	Jeremy Gregory	41	—	—	Rockies 3
2002	"I Ain't Playin'" (As Rockmelons featuring Roxane)	Roxane LeBrasse	79	—	—	Rockies 3
2002	"Police Woman 2002" (with Groove Quantize)	N/A	promo	promo	—	Variations to a Theme
"—" denotes releases that did not chart or were not released in that territory.

== Awards and nominations ==
=== APRA Awards ===
The APRA Awards are presented annually from 1982 by the Australasian Performing Right Association (APRA).

Year	Nominee / work	Award	Result
2003	All I Want Is You" (Bryon Jones, Jonathan Jones, Raymond Medhurst, Daniel Dharumasena, Andrew De Silva, Paul Cecchinelli)	Most Performed Dance Work	Nominated

=== ARIA Music Awards ===
The ARIA Music Awards is an annual awards ceremony that recognises excellence, innovation, and achievement across all genres of Australian music.

Year	Nominee / work	Award	Result
1989	Tales of the City	Breakthrough Artist – Album	Won
1995	"Stronger Together"	Best Dance Release	Nominated
