= My Forbidden Lover =

Single by Chic

from the album Risqué
- B-side: "What About Me?"
- Released: 1979
- Recorded: 1979
- Studio: Power Station, New York City
- Genre: Funk, disco
- Length: 4:39 (album version); 3:30 (single version)
- Label: Atlantic (3620)
- Songwriter(s): Bernard Edwards; Nile Rodgers
- Producer(s): Bernard Edwards; Nile Rodgers

Chic singles chronology
"Good Times" (1979)	"My Forbidden Lover" (1979)	"My Feet Keep Dancing" (1979)

"My Forbidden Lover" is the second single from Chic's 1979 album Risqué. From the funk/soul genre, and in the style of disco, the song was written and produced by Chic's two frontmen, Bernard Edwards and Nile Rodgers.

The song's backing track has been sampled in the subsequent years, including in the 1999 Nerio's Dubwork song "Sunshine and Happiness", the 2001 Alcazar song "Sexual Guarantee", the 2006 Luther Vandross song "Shine" (along with its cover by Booty Luv), the Darryl Pandy song "Sunshine & Happiness", and the 2010 Black Eyed Peas song "Fashion Beats". Canadian producer deadmau5 sampled this song in one of his early works, "I Don't Want No Other", released on his SectionZ page in 2001.

Billboard described "My Forbidden Lover" as following its #1 soul music hit "Good Times" with "another impeccably produced rhythm number." Cash Box said it was similar to "Good Times," "striking the same groove without being totally repetitive." Record World called it a "gem" and "a typically marvelous Chic dance song with trademark falsetto lead & harmony vocals."

== Charts ==
"My Forbidden Lover" reached #15 on the UK singles chart in October 1979, spending 8 weeks on the chart. On US disco chart, along with the tracks, "Good Times" and "My Feet Keep Dancing", "My Forbidden Lover" went to #3. It didn't reach the US Billboard top 40 pop chart (#43).

Chart (1979)	Peak position
United Kingdom	15
Belgium	19
Netherlands	23
Ireland	28
United States	43
Germany	47

== Track listings ==
Atlantic 7" 3620 September 18, 1979

- A. "My Forbidden Lover" (7" Edit) - 3:30
- B. "What About Me?" - 4:10

Atlantic promo 12" DSKO 207, 1979

- A. "My Forbidden Lover" (Extended 12" Mix) - 6:29
- B. "What About Me?" - 4:10
