= Disco Montego =

Australian music trio

- Also known as: Kaylan, Studio 347
- Origin: Melbourne, Victoria, Australia
- Genres: R&B, dance
- Years active: 1995–2005, 2010
- Past members: Darren Dowlut; Dennis Dowlut; Tony Vass

Disco Montego (earlier known as Kaylan) were an Australian R&B and dance music trio. The Dowlut brothers Dennis and Darren, together with Tony Vass formed Kaylan in Melbourne in 1995. They released an R&B album No Commandments in 2000, which reached No. 23 in Australia and spawned three top 50 singles. In May 2001, they became the studio based group Disco Montego, and released further singles followed by Disco Montego in September 2002. Their production work included remixing Mariah Carey's "Boy (I Need You)" in 2004.

The trio's music career was cut short when Darren died of cancer on 5 August 2005, six weeks after being diagnosed with a chest tumour. In 2010, Dennis Dowlut revived the Disco Montego name with Michael Abdul and released "Hearts on Fire" to celebrate the FIFA World Cup. In 2010, Dennis Dowlut's new band, Electric Empire, released their album independently. Electric Empire have sold over 30,000 copies of their debut album worldwide, with releases in the UK, Japan and France.

== History ==
Dennis Dowlut was born c. 1974 in the United Kingdom; his younger brother, Darren, was born c. 1978 in Mauritius. The Dowlut family relocated to Melbourne, Australia. By 1995, Dennis and Darren formed Kaylan as an R&B performance group; it was named for a nephew. Their parents returned to Mauritius. In 1996, the band signed with Warner Records.

From 1998, Kaylan started recording tracks with Rockmelons' Ray Medhurst, Bryon Jones and Jon Jones producing. Their first release was "Rock Me All Night" in March 2000, which peaked at No. 14 on the Australian Recording Industry Association (ARIA) Singles Chart. "Shake It" followed in August (No. 15) with the album, No Commandments (No. 23 on the ARIA Albums Chart), appearing in September. A third single, "Because of You" was released in March 2001 (No. 50). While working on No Commandments, the Dowlut brothers also wrote two tracks for Bardot (2000) the debut album by winner of reality TV contest Popstars, the pop group Bardot. They performed a dance role for Baz Luhrmann's film Moulin Rouge! (2001). Kaylan toured nationally in support of Vengaboys, then Destiny's Child and followed with a tour supporting Bardot. A bonus disc of five tracks remixed by Studio 347 (Darren Dowlut, Dennis Dowlut and Tony Vass) was released with No Commandments in Australia. Studio 347 remixed tracks, "These Days" and "ASAP" for Bardot and "When We Were Young" for pop vocal group Human Nature.

By May 2001, Kaylan was renamed as Disco Montego, a dance music group, and released "We Got Love" in mid-year, well ahead of their album Disco Montego which appeared on WEA in September 2002. Kaylan's song "Because of You" was re-recorded and remixed by Disco Montego, Studio 347 programmed and remixed tracks. Two songs feature Katie Underwood (ex-Bardot) on vocals, including the single "Beautiful" released in May. It reached No. 9 and was certified as gold by ARIA. The track reached No. 10 on the ARIA Dance Singles Chart for 2002. The duo joined with Underwood to perform on the Rumba festival which toured Australia and New Zealand in September, headlined by Bon Jovi.

"Magic", the next single, also featured Underwood, reached No. 22. The final single "U Talkin' to Me" peaked at No. 17. "Beautiful" was nominated as 'Best Pop Release' and 'Best Video' at the 2002 ARIA Awards. "U Talkin' to Me" won an Australasian Performing Right Association (APRA) Award for 'Most Performed Dance Work' during 2003 at APRA Awards of 2004. The track "Autumn Breeze", written by the Dowluts, was recorded by German pop group No Angels for their second album Now... Us! (2002), which achieved popularity in Europe.

The Dowlut brothers ran Bomb Music with partner George Said and were developing the career of Jeremy Gregory (ex-Rockmelons) who signed to Warner Music in the US. The group remixed a Mariah Carey track "Boy (I Need You)" from her 2002 album Charmbracelet after Carey was aware of their Australian success. They performed a remix of "Sorry Seems to Be the Hardest Word" by Elton John and Blue in 2003. They wrote "What Will They Say" for Jimmy Barnes' album Double Happiness (2005) (a duet with his brother John Swan) and also produced the track.

Disco Montego were planning to relocate in 2005 to Los Angeles to take advantage of their higher profile. However, Darren Dowlut was diagnosed with a chest tumour and died six weeks later on 5 August of the cancer, aged 27. Carey was among performers who sent condolences.

In 2009, Dennis Dowlut, Jason Heerah and Aaron Mendoza created a funk, R&B and jazz fusion band, Electric Empire, which released their debut album, Electric Empire in September 2010. In June, Dowlut revived the Disco Montego name with the help of friend and fellow music producer Michael Abdul. They released "Hearts on Fire", a celebration of the 2010 FIFA World Cup in association with Nando's to raise awareness for the 'United Against Malaria' campaign, which was distributed through Varrasso PR.

== Members ==
Kaylan (1995–2001), Studio 347 (2000–2002), Disco Montego (2001–2005, 2010)

- Darren Dowlut – vocals, song writing, programming, mixing, producing, guitar (1995–2005) (d 5 August 2005)
- Dennis Dowlut – vocals, song writing, programming, mixing, producing (1995–2005, 2010)
- Tony Vass – production (2000–2002) as member of Studio 347

== Discography ==
List of albums, with selected chart positions
Title	Album details	Peak chart positions
Title	Album details	AUS
as Kaylan
No Commandments	Released: 17 September 2000; Label: Warner Bros. Records; Format: CD, Cassette	23
as Disco Montego
Disco Montego	Released: 9 September 2002; Label: Warner Bros. Records; Format: CD	17

=== Singles ===
List of singles, with selected chart positions and certifications
Title	Year	Peak chart positions	Certifications	Album
Title	Year	AUS	Certifications	Album
as Kaylan
"Rock Me All Night"	2000	14		No Commandments
"Shake It"	2000	15		No Commandments
"Because of You"	2001	50		No Commandments
as Disco Montego
"We Got Love"	2001	98		Disco Montego
"Beautiful" (featuring Katie Underwood)	2002	9	AUS: Gold	Disco Montego
"Magic" (featuring Katie Underwood)	2002	22		Disco Montego
"Good Times" (featuring Katie Underwood, Selwyn, Peta Morris, Jeremy Gregory)	2002	52		Non-album single
"U Talkin' to Me"	2002	17		Disco Montego
"Hearts on Fire"	2010	-		Non-album single

== Awards and nominations ==
=== APRA Awards ===
The APRA Awards are presented annually from 1982 by the Australasian Performing Right Association (APRA).

Year	Nominee / work	Award	Result
2003	"Beautiful" – Disco Montego featuring Katie Underwood (Katie Underwood, Darren Dowlut, Dennis Dowlut)	Most Performed Dance Work	Won
2004	"U Talkin' to Me" – Disco Montego (Darren Dowlut, Dennis Dowlut, Robert Woolf)	Most Performed Dance Work	Won

=== ARIA Awards ===
The annual ARIA Music Awards are presented by the Australian Recording Industry Association since 1987. Disco Montego has received three nominations.

Year	Nominee / work	Award	Result
2002	"Beautiful"	Best Pop Release	Nominated
2002	"Beautiful"	Best Video	Nominated
2003	Disco Montego	Best Dance Release	Nominated
