= Good Times (Chic song) =

1979 single by Chic

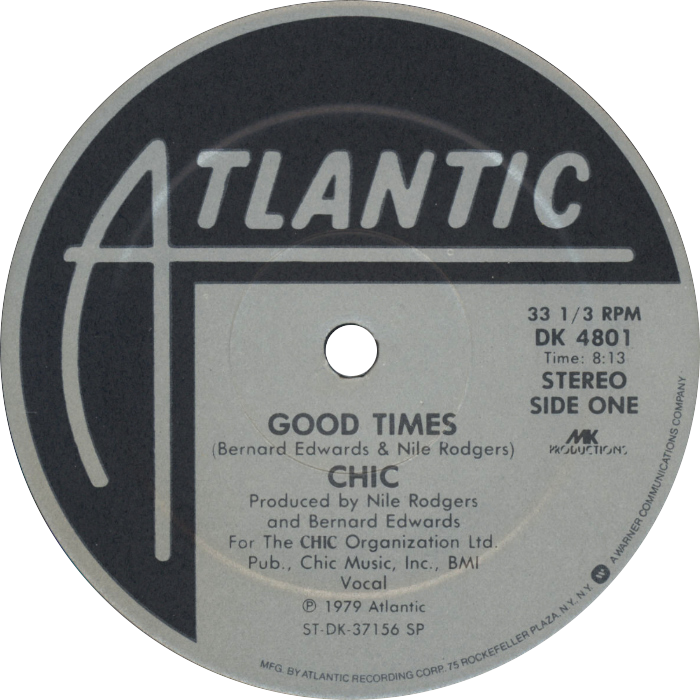
- Side one of US 12-inch single

Single by Chic

from the album Risqué
- B-side: "A Warm Summer Night"
- Released: June 4, 1979
- Recorded: 1978
- Studio: Power Station, New York City
- Genre: Funk; disco
- Length: 8:13 (LP version); 3:42 (7-inch edit)
- Label: Atlantic (3584)
- Songwriters: Bernard Edwards; Nile Rodgers
- Producers: Bernard Edwards; Nile Rodgers

Chic singles chronology
"I Want Your Love" (1979)	"Good Times" (1979)	"My Forbidden Lover" (1979)

Music video
- "Good Times - Chic" on YouTube

"Good Times" is a disco soul song by American R&B band Chic, released in June 1979 by Atlantic Records as the first single from their third album, Risqué (1979). It was both written and produced by Bernard Edwards and Nile Rodgers, and peaked at number one on the US Billboard Hot 100 on August 18, 1979. In Europe, the song peaked at number five on the UK Singles Chart and was a top-20 hit in Belgium, the Netherlands and Sweden. "Good Times" ranks 68th on Rolling Stone's list of the "500 Greatest Songs of All Time", and has become one of the most sampled songs in music history, most notably in hip hop music. Originally released with "A Warm Summer Night" on the B-side, it was reissued in 2004 with "I Want Your Love" on the B-side, a version which was certified Silver in the UK.

== Lyrics and inspiration ==
The lyrics include a reference to Milton Ager's "Happy Days Are Here Again". It also contains lines based on lyrics featured in "About a Quarter to Nine" made famous by Al Jolson. Nile Rodgers has stated that these Great Depression-era lyrics were used as a hidden way to comment on the then-current economic conditions in the United States.

It encourages listeners to don their roller skates and "participate", which alludes to the roller disco trend that peaked in 1979.

In a 2015 interview Rodgers stated that "Good Times" was partly inspired by the 1974 Kool & The Gang song "Hollywood Swinging".

== Reception ==
Cash Box praised the "excellent production" and "bright, sassy female vocals." Record World said that "cuddly vocals, crystalline piano & production equal 'good times.'"

== Chart performance ==
The song hit number-one on the US Billboard Hot 100 on August 18, 1979, before being ousted by The Knack's smash hit "My Sharona" the following week. Along with the songs "My Forbidden Lover" and "My Feet Keep Dancing", "Good Times" reached #3 on the disco chart. It reportedly sold more than 5 million copies, making it, at the time, the best-selling 45 rpm single in the history of Atlantic Records. Billboard named "Good Times" the number one soul single of 1979.

== Impact and legacy ==
In 1998, DJ Magazine ranked "Good Times" No. 70 in their list of "Top 100 Club Tunes". In 2000, VH1 ranked it No. 44 in their list of "100 Greatest Dance Songs". In 2003, English music journalist Paul Morley included it in his list of "Greatest Pop Single of All Time". In 2005, Stylus Magazine included its bassline at No. 3 in their list of "Top 50 Basslines of All Time", while Mixmag featured it in their "The Best Basslines in Dance Music" in 2020. In 2009, "Good Times" was ranked No. 41 on Entertainment Weekly's "The 100 Greatest Summer Songs", saying, "The sinfully infectious bass line alone was enough to fill a sweltering dance floor in 100-degree weather." In 2020, Slant Magazine ranked it No. 60 in their list of "The 100 Best Dance Songs of All Time". In 2022 and 2024, Rolling Stone ranked it No. 3 and No. 68 in their lists of "200 Greatest Dance Songs of All Time" and "500 Greatest Songs of All Time". In 2024, Forbes ranked "Good Times" No. 18 in their list of "The 30 Greatest Disco Songs of All Time". In March 2025, Billboard magazine ranked it No. 10 in their list of "The 100 Best Dance Songs of All Time", writing, "It remains a song that brings people to the dancefloor no matter the occasion or format."

== Track listing and formats ==
- 7" vinyl single

A. "Good Times" – 3:42
B. "A Warm Summer Night" – 6:08

- 12" vinyl single

A. "Good Times" – 8:10
B. "A Warm Summer Night" – 6:08

- Promo 12" vinyl single

A. "Good Times" – 8:08
B. "Good Times" – 3:42

- 12" 2004 reissue

A. "Good Times" – 8:15
B. "I Want Your Love" – 6:53

== Charts ==
=== Weekly charts ===
Chart (1979)	Peak position
Australia (Kent Music Report)	48
Belgium (Ultratop 50 Flanders)	18
Canada Top Singles (RPM)	2
Canada Top Disco Singles (RPM)	1
Ireland (IRMA)	21
Netherlands (Dutch Top 40)	17
Netherlands (Single Top 100)	22
New Zealand (Recorded Music NZ)	8
Sweden (Sverigetopplistan)	16
UK Singles (Official Charts)	5
US Billboard Hot 100	1
US Adult Contemporary (Billboard)	28
US Hot Soul Singles (Billboard)	1
US Dance Club Songs (Billboard)	3
US Cash Box Top 100	1
West Germany (GfK)	36

Chart (2013)	Peak position
France (SNEP)	107

=== Year-end charts ===
Chart (1979)	Rank
Canada Top Singles (RPM)	40
US Billboard Hot 100	20
US Hot Soul Singles (Billboard)	1
US Cash Box Top 100	12

== Certifications ==
Region	Certification	Certified units/sales
New Zealand (RMNZ)	Gold	15,000^{‡}
United Kingdom (BPI) 2004 reissue	Silver	200,000^{‡}
United States (RIAA)	Gold	1,000,000^{^}
^{^} Shipments figures based on certification alone.^{‡} Sales+streaming figures based on certification alone.

== Personnel ==
- Vocals: Alfa Anderson
- Piano: Andrew Barrett (Schwartz)
- Bass guitar, vocals: Bernard Edwards
- Strings: Cheryl Hong
- Vocals: Fonzi Thornton
- Strings: Karen Karlsrud
- Strings: Karen Milne
- Vocals: Luci Martin
- Vocals: Michele Cobbs
- Guitar: Nile Rodgers
- Keyboards: Raymond Jones
- Keyboards: Robert Sabino
- Percussion: Sammy Figueroa
- Drums: Tony Thompson
- Vocals: Ullanda McCullough
- Strings: Valerie Haywood
- Writers: Bernard Edwards, Nile Rodgers
- Producers: Bernard Edwards, Nile Rodgers
- Engineer: Bob Clearmountain
- Masterer: Dennis King

== Disco Montego version ==
"Good Times"

Single by Disco Montego featuring Selwyn, Katie Underwood, Peta Morris and Jeremy Gregory
- B-side: "Disco Montego Megamix"
- Released: November 4, 2002
- Recorded: 2002
- Length: 4:01
- Label: Bomb; WEA
- Songwriters: Bernard Edwards; Nile Rodgers

Disco Montego singles chronology
"Magic" (2002)	"Good Times" (2002)	"U Talkin' to Me" (2003)

Selwyn singles chronology
"Like This, Like That" (2002)	"Good Times" (2002)	"Boomin'" (2004)

Katie Underwood singles chronology
"Magic" (2002)	"Good Times" (2002)	"Danger" (2003)

Peta Morris singles chronology
"The Sound of Breaking Up" (2001)	"Good Times" (2002)	"Sunshine Eyes" (2005)

Jeremy Gregory singles chronology
"Good Times" (2002)	"That's What's Goin' Down" (2003)

"Good Times" was covered by Australian musicians Disco Montego, Selwyn, Katie Underwood, Peta Morris, and Jeremy Gregory and released on November 4, 2002. It was released as part of Australia's 'Rumba' music festival, which took place in November and December 2002 across Australia. The song peaked at number 52 on the ARIA Singles Chart in December 2002.

=== Track listing ===
CD single

1. "Good Times"
2. "Good Times" (karaoke version)
3. "Disco Montego Megamix"
4. "Good Times" (extended mix)

=== Charts ===
Chart (2002)	Peak position
Australia (ARIA)	52

== Sampling and motifs ==
The bass line of "Good Times" was recreated in the Sugarhill Gang's 1979 single "Rapper's Delight", a key track in the development of hip hop. Nile Rodgers and Bernard Edwards threatened legal action over copyright, which resulted in a settlement and their being credited as co-writers. Rodgers said that he was originally upset with the song, but later declared it to be "one of his favorite songs of all time" and his favorite of all the tracks that sampled Chic (the song used samples of the strings, and an interpolation of the bass line). He also stated that "as innovative and important as 'Good Times' was, 'Rapper's Delight' was just as much, if not more so." Traditionally, Chic's live performances of "Good Times" incorporate a portion of "Rapper's Delight" including audience participation call-and-response.

UK garage group Da Click's 1999 debut single "Good Rhymes" interpolated the song's bassline and chorus along with vocals from Luther Vandross' "Never Too Much".

Queen's John Deacon reportedly used the song's bass line as inspiration for his own bass line for the band's 1980 single "Another One Bites the Dust". The lines were so similar that the press accused Chic of ripping off the line from Queen even though "Good Times" was recorded and released earlier. Both Rodgers and Edwards said that Deacon was hanging around them when "Good Times" was recorded. Years later, Queen guitarist Brian May acknowledged Chic's influence on Deacon's playing, saying, "It's very Nile Rodgers. John absolutely adored him — we all do. John was very influenced by him, without a doubt. What an amazing guy Nile Rodgers is."

Man Enough by Def Leppard, from their 2015 album Def Leppard, has been described by Classic Rock as ripping off Another One Bites the Dust (which itself took influence from Chic's "Good Times").
