= My Feet Keep Dancing =

Single by Chic

from the album Risqué
- B-side: "Will You Cry (When You Hear This Song)"
- Released: December 1979
- Recorded: 1979
- Studio: Power Station, New York City
- Genre: Disco
- Length: 6:38 (album version); 3:51 (single version)
- Label: Atlantic (3683)
- Songwriters: Bernard Edwards; Nile Rodgers
- Producers: Bernard Edwards; Nile Rodgers

Chic singles chronology
"My Forbidden Lover" (1979)	"My Feet Keep Dancing" (1979)	"Rebels Are We" (1980)

"My Feet Keep Dancing" is the third single from Chic's third studio album Risqué. It features a co-lead vocal by Luci Martin and Bernard Edwards and a tap dance solo by Fayard Nicholas (of the Nicholas Brothers), Eugene Jackson (of Our Gang), and Sammy Warren.

Cash Box described it as an "ear-catching dance concoction, with its rhythmic use of strings." Record World called it "a fine example of how Chic sets the standards for today's dance music."

== Track listings ==
Atlantic 7" 3638, 1979

- A. "My Feet Keep Dancing" (7" Edit) - 3:51
- B. "Will You Cry (When You Hear This Song)" - 4:05

Atlantic promo 12" DSKO 220

- A. "My Feet Keep Dancing" - 6:38
- B. "Will You Cry (When You Hear This Song)" - 4:05

== Chart ==
The song reached #21 on the UK singles chart in January 1980, spending 9 weeks on the chart. It failed to enter US Billboard R&B chart top 40, peaking at #42. On the Dance Club Songs chart, "My Feet Keep Dancing," along with "Good Times" and "My Forbidden Lover," peaked at #3.
