= Jeremy Gregory =

Jeremy Gregory is a South-African born, Australian singer and musician. He has recorded with Australian bands The Rockmelons and Disco Montego, co-written minor commercial hits including "Let It Go" by Will Young, as well as performing his own work "That's What's Going Down", which was in the Australian Top 40 singles charts for three weeks, peaking at #31. As of March 2011, Gregory is a member of the Australian band Village Kid.

== Discography ==
=== As lead artist ===
Year	Title	Peak position	Album
Year	Title	AUS	Album
2002	"All I Want Is You" (Rockmelons featuring Jeremy Gregory)	41	Rockies 3
2003	"That's What's Goin' Down"	31	
2011	"Song Iz My Diary"		
2016	"Seasons"		
2017	"Dream"		
2020	"Novocaine"		
2021	"Credit for Love"		
2022	"Don't Force It"		
2023	"Birds Eye View"		

== Awards and nominations ==
=== Vanda & Young Global Songwriting Competition ===
The Vanda & Young Global Songwriting Competition is an annual competition that "acknowledges great songwriting whilst supporting and raising money for Nordoff-Robbins" and is coordinated by Albert Music and APRA AMCOS. It commenced in 2009.

Year	Nominee / work	Award	Result	Ref.
2025	"Close to Me" (with Bailey Pickles)	Vanda & Young Global Songwriting Competition	Finalist	
