= Vanessa Amorosi discography =

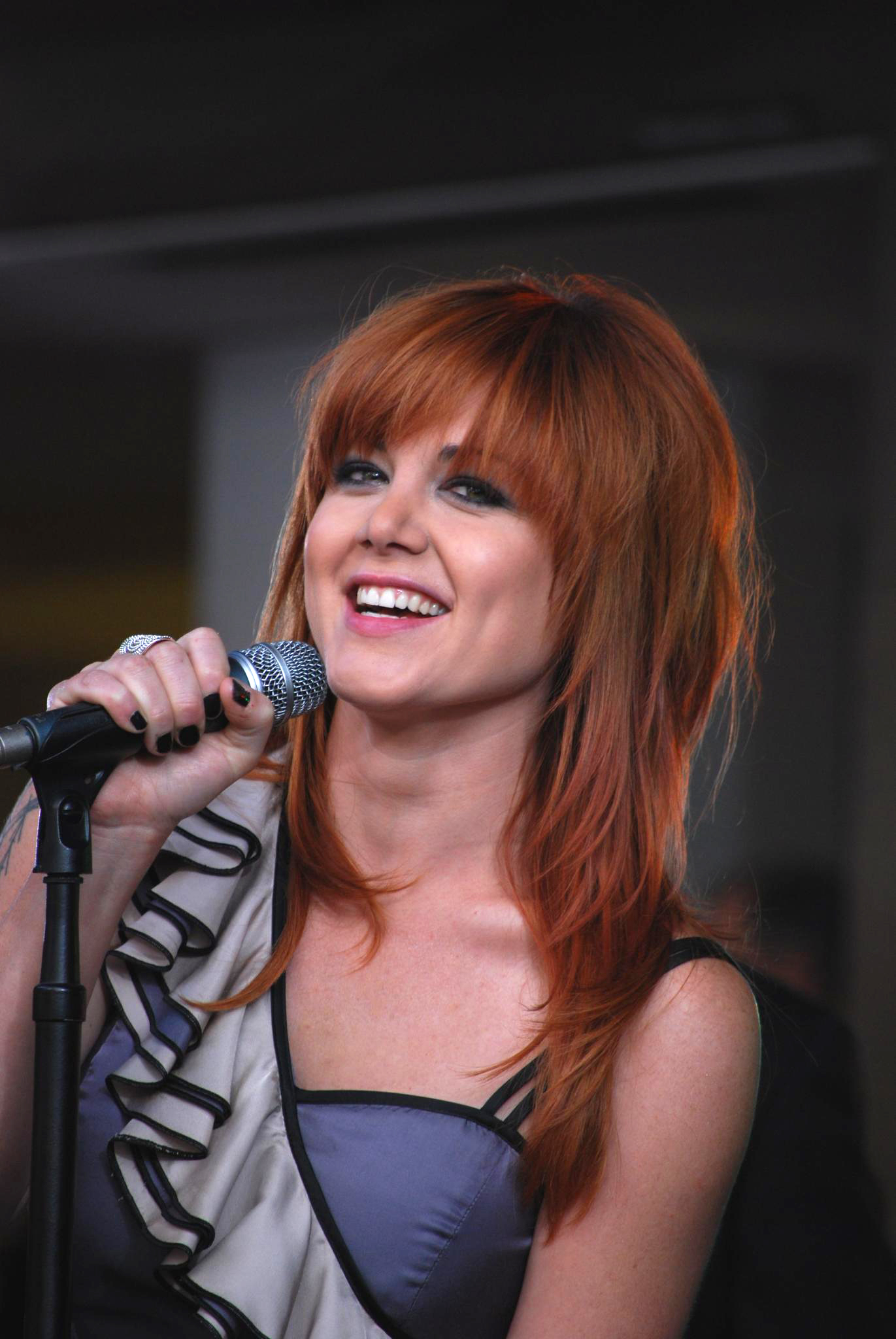
- Amorosi performing in October 2009
- Studio albums: 8
- Extended plays: 2
- Compilation albums: 2
- Singles: 38
- Music videos: 25

The discography of Vanessa Amorosi, an Australian pop singer, consists of eight studio albums, two compilation albums and thirty-eight singles. In Australia, Amorosi signed a recording contract with BMG in 1999, she was also signed with Universal from 2006 to 2012.

Amorosi's debut album The Power was released in April 2000. The album reached number one on the Australian albums chart and was certified platinum four times by the Australian Recording Industry Association (ARIA). It also went top ten in Germany where it was certified gold. The album's most successful single "Absolutely Everybody" was a top ten hit throughout Europe, reaching number seven in the United Kingdom, and remains her most successful single worldwide. In 2001, a compilation of rarities called Turn to Me was released in Australia. Her second album Change was released in Germany in November 2002, but for unknown reasons skipped an Australian release. After several years from the spotlight, Amorosi returned in 2008 with the release of her third album Somewhere in the Real World which debuted at number four in Australia and achieved gold status. The album produced Amorosi's third platinum accredited single "Perfect". Her fourth album, Hazardous was released in November 2009 which later was certified Platinum by ARIA. In November 2011, Amorosi was set to release her fifth studio album V, but the album was delayed indefinitely following the commercial under-performance of its two singles "Gossip" and "Amazing". Amorosi later left Universal Music, leaving the album shelved.

== Albums ==
=== Studio albums ===
| Title | Album details | Peak chart positions | | | | | Certifications |
| Title | Album details | AUS | AUT | GER | JPN | SWI | Certifications |
|---|---|---|---|---|---|---|---|
| The Power | Released: 3 April 2000; Formats: CD; Label: BMG | 1 | 21 | 7 | 93 | 15 | ARIA: 4× Platinum; IFPI GER: Gold |
| Change | Released: 18 November 2002 (Germany only); Formats: CD; Label: Universal | —N/a | — | 64 | — | — | |
| Somewhere in the Real World | Released: 24 May 2008; Formats: CD, digital download; Label: Universal | 4 | — | — | — | — | ARIA: Gold |
| Hazardous | Released: 6 November 2009; Formats: CD, digital download; Label: Universal | 7 | — | — | — | — | ARIA: Gold |
| Back to Love | Released: 8 November 2019; Formats: digital download, streaming; Label: Angel Works Productions, Universal | 84 | — | — | — | — | |
| The Blacklisted Collection | Released: 26 June 2020; Formats: digital download, streaming; Label: Vanessa Amorosi | 79 | — | — | — | — | |
| City of Angels | Released: 18 March 2022; Formats: CD, digital download, streaming; Label: Scream Louder | 7 | — | — | — | — | |
| Memphis Love | Released: 17 November 2023; Formats: CD, digital download, streaming; Label: Bay Street | — | — | — | — | — | |
"—" denotes releases that did not chart or were not released in that country.

=== Unreleased albums ===
| Title | Album details |
|---|---|
| V | Planned: 28 October 2011; Formats: CD, digital download; Label: Universal |

=== Compilation albums ===
| Title | Album details | Peak chart positions |
| Title | Album details | AUS |
|---|---|---|
| Turn to Me | Released: 21 October 2001; Formats: CD; Label: BMG | 21 |
| The Best of Vanessa Amorosi | Released: 24 November 2005; Formats: CD/DVD; Label: Rajon | — |
"—" denotes releases that did not chart or were not released in that country.

== Extended plays ==
| Title | Details |
|---|---|
| Vol. 1 | Released: 26 March 2021; Formats: digital; Label: Vanessa Amorosi |
| Vol. 2 | Released: 11 June 2021; Formats: digital; Label: Vanessa Amorosi |
| Celebrating 25 Years Live | Released: 30 October 2026; Formats: digital; Label: Chasing Bullets |

== Singles ==
| Title | Year | Peak chart positions | | | | | | | | Certifications | Album |
| Title | Year | AUS | AUT | BEL (FL) | GER | NZ | SWE | SWI | UK | Certifications | Album |
|---|---|---|---|---|---|---|---|---|---|---|---|
| "Have a Look" | 1999 | 13 | — | — | 73 | — | — | 72 | — | ARIA: Gold | The Power |
| "Absolutely Everybody" | 1999 | 6 | 3 | 10 | 5 | 10 | 42 | 8 | 7 | ARIA: Platinum; IFPI GER: Gold; RMNZ: Gold | The Power |
| "Shine" | 2000 | 4 | 46 | — | 38 | — | — | 19 | — | ARIA: Platinum | The Power |
| "The Power" | 2000 | 8 | — | — | — | — | — | — | — | ARIA: Gold | The Power |
| "Everytime I Close My Eyes" | 2000 | 8 | 11 | — | 23 | — | — | 73 | — | | The Power |
| "Champagne, Champagne" (Note: Released as a single in France only.) | 2001 | — | — | — | — | — | — | — | — | | Absolument Fabuleux |
| "Turn to Me" | 2001 | 80 | — | — | — | — | — | — | — | | Turn to Me |
| "One Thing Leads 2 Another" | 2002 | — | — | — | 67 | — | — | 62 | — | | Change |
| "Spin (Everybody's Doin' It)" | 2002 | 34 | — | — | — | — | — | — | — | | Change |
| "True to Yourself" (Note: Released as a single in Germany only.) | 2003 | — | — | — | 99 | — | — | — | — | | Change |
| "Kiss Your Mama!" | 2007 | 15 | — | — | — | — | — | — | — | | Somewhere in the Real World |
| "Perfect" | 2008 | 4 | — | — | — | — | — | — | — | ARIA: Platinum | Somewhere in the Real World |
| "The Simple Things (Something Emotional)" | 2008 | 36 | — | — | — | — | — | — | — | | Somewhere in the Real World |
| "The Letter" (with Hoobastank) | 2009 | 39 | — | — | — | — | — | — | — | | For(n)ever |
| "This Is Who I Am" | 2009 | 1 | — | — | — | — | — | — | — | ARIA: 2× Platinum | Hazardous |
| "Hazardous" | 2009 | 29 | — | — | — | — | — | — | — | | Hazardous |
| "Mr. Mysterious" | 2010 | 4 | — | — | — | — | — | — | — | ARIA: Platinum | Hazardous |
| "Holiday" | 2010 | 42 | — | — | — | — | — | — | — | | Hazardous |
| "Gossip" | 2011 | 113 | — | — | — | — | — | — | — | | V (unreleased) |
| "Amazing" | 2011 | 83 | — | — | — | — | — | — | — | | V (unreleased) |
| "Heavy Lies the Head" | 2019 | — (Note: "Heavy Lies the Head" did not enter the ARIA Top 100 Singles Chart, but peaked at number 33 on the ARIA Digital Track Chart.) | — | — | — | — | — | — | — | | Back to Love |
| "Hello Me" | 2019 | — (Note: "Hello Me" did not enter the ARIA Top 100 Singles Chart, but peaked at number 37 on the ARIA Digital Track Chart.) | — | — | — | — | — | — | — | | Back to Love |
| "Lessons of Love" | 2020 | — | — | — | — | — | — | — | — | | Back to Love |
| "Coming Down Off You" | 2020 | — | — | — | — | — | — | — | — | | The Blacklisted Collection |
| "Sweet Mirage" | 2020 | — | — | — | — | — | — | — | — | | The Blacklisted Collection |
| "15,000 Revs" | 2020 | — | — | — | — | — | — | — | — | | The Blacklisted Collection |
| "Isolation" | 2020 | — | — | — | — | — | — | — | — | | The Blacklisted Collection |
| "Crazy Jealous" | 2020 | — | — | — | — | — | — | — | — | | The Blacklisted Collection |
| "Devil Monster" | 2020 | — | — | — | — | — | — | — | — | | The Blacklisted Collection |
| "Make Love Not War" | 2020 | — | — | — | — | — | — | — | — | | The Blacklisted Collection |
| "I Don't Know How to Be Happy" | 2020 | — | — | — | — | — | — | — | — | | The Blacklisted Collection |
| "The Light" | 2020 | — | — | — | — | — | — | — | — | | The Blacklisted Collection |
| "Muhammad" | 2021 | — | — | — | — | — | — | — | — | | Vol. 2 |
| "City of Angels" | 2022 | — | — | — | — | — | — | — | — | | City of Angels |
| "Crash Now Burn" | 2022 | — | — | — | — | — | — | — | — | | City of Angels |
| "Good Times Are Coming" | 2022 | — | — | — | — | — | — | — | — | | Non-album single |
| "Wolf" | 2023 | — | — | — | — | — | — | — | — | | Memphis Love |
| "How Long" | 2023 | — | — | — | — | — | — | — | — | | Memphis Love |
| "Lift Us Up" | 2024 | — | — | — | — | — | — | — | — | | Memphis Love |
"—" denotes a recording that did not chart or was not released in that territory.

== Music videos ==
| Year | Song | Director(s) |
|---|---|---|
| 1999 | "Have a Look" | |
| 1999 | "Absolutely Everybody" | The Allix Brothers |
| 2000 | "Absolutely Everybody" (Australian Millennium version) | |
| 2000 | "Shine" | |
| 2000 | "The Power" | |
| 2000 | "Everytime I Close My Eyes" | Clive Sacke |
| 2000 | "Absolutely Everybody" (European version) | |
| 2000 | "Absolutely Everybody" (Party version) | |
| 2001 | "Have a Look" (European version) | |
| 2001 | "Shine" (European version) | |
| 2001 | "Turn to Me" (Animated video) | |
| 2002 | "One Thing Leads 2 Another" | Markus Walter |
| 2002 | "Spin (Everybody's Doin' It)" | |
| 2007 | "Kiss Your Mama!" | Stuart Gosling |
| 2008 | "Perfect" | Stuart Gosling |
| 2008 | "The Simple Things (Something Emotional)" | |
| 2008 | "My House" | Simon Bookallil |
| 2009 | "The Letter" (with Hoobastank) | Paul R. Brown |
| 2009 | "This Is Who I Am" | Christopher R. Watson |
| 2009 | "Hazardous" | Paul R. Brown |
| 2010 | "Mr. Mysterious" | Stuart Gosling |
| 2010 | "This Is Who I Am" (European version) | Phil Griffin |
| 2010 | "Holiday" | Dan Ruttley |
| 2011 | "Gossip" | Stuart Gosling |
| 2011 | "Amazing" | Stuart Gosling |
| 2011 | "Summer Paradise" (tour video by Simple Plan featuring K'naan; Amorosi makes a cameo) | Mark Staubach |
| 2019 | "Wolf" | Jesse Davey |
| 2019 | "Heavy Lies the Head" | |
| 2019 | "Hello Me" | |
| 2021 | "Muhammad" | |
| 2022 | "Crash Now Burn" | |
| 2023 | "Wolf" | |
| 2023 | "How Long" | |
| 2024 | "Lift Us Up" | |

== Guest appearances ==
| Year | Song | Album |
|---|---|---|
| 1998 | "Get Here" | Sydney Central Plaza promo single |
| 1999 | "Home for Christmas" | The Spirit of Christmas 1999 |
| 1999 | "Feeling Alright" (Kate Ceberano with Vika & Linda & Vanessa Amorosi) | True Romantic: The Best of Kate Ceberano (2 CD limited edition) |
| 2000 | "Heroes Live Forever" | 2000 Olympics: Music from the Opening Ceremony |
| 2000 | "Shine" (live and acoustic) | More Music Live from The Panel |
| 2001 | "Santa Claus Is Coming to Town" | The Spirit of Christmas 2001 |
| 2002 | "Gimme Tonight" (Sash! featuring Vanessa Amorosi) | S4! (Promo) |
| 2008 | "Piece of My Heart" | Concert for Max – Benefit Concert for Max Merritt |
| 2008 | "It's a Long Way to the Top (If You Wanna Rock 'n' Roll)" | Concert for Max – Benefit Concert for Max Merritt |
| 2009 | "Get Off of My Cloud" (Duet with Ashley Naylor) | The RocKwiz Duets: The Beat Goes On – Volume 3 |
| 2010 | "Each Tear" (Mary J. Blige featuring Vanessa Amorosi) | Stronger with Each Tear (Australian version) |
| 2010 | "I Wish Christmas Would Last A Year" | The Spirit of Christmas 2010 |
| 2011 | "Private Number" (Jon Stevens featuring Vanessa Amorosi) | Testify! |
| 2013 | "Drugs Taught Me a Lesson" (featuring Vanessa Amorosi & The Ringmaster's Choir) | Lucky Numbers (Dave Stewart album) |
| 2013 | "How to Ruin a Romance" (featuring Vanessa Amorosi) | Lucky Numbers (Dave Stewart album) |
| 2013 | "What's Wrong with Me?" (featuring Vanessa Amorosi & The Ringmaster's Choir) | Lucky Numbers (Dave Stewart album) |
| 2017 | "Something Bout You" (Jon Stevens featuring Vanessa Amorosi) | Starlight |
| 2023 | "True to Yourself" (with Olivia Newton-John) | Just the Two of Us: The Duets Collection (Vol. 1) |
