= David Franj =

Australian singer-songwriter (born 1975)

- Also known as: David Franciosa
- Born: David Frangiosa; 23 September 1975 (age 51); Melbourne, Australia
- Genres: Pop, pop rock
- Occupation: Singer-songwriter
- Years active: 2002–present
- Labels: Shock, Standard Publishing

David Frangiosa (born 23 September 1975), known professionally as David Franj, is an Australian singer-songwriter. Frangiosa had three singles on the ARIA Singles Chart top 40: "Oxygen" (March 2002), "Never Be Amazing" (August) and "God Only Knows" (February 2003). All appeared on his debut album, Wrong Place, Wrong Time (March 2003), which reached the ARIA Albums Chart top 60.

He co-wrote the song "Perfect" (April 2008) with its performer, Vanessa Amorosi, which reached No. 4 on the ARIA Charts and is certified double platinum. It was nominated as the Most Played Australian Work at the APRA Music Awards of 2009.

== Biography ==
David Franj, was born as David Frangiosa, and was raised in Melbourne.

Franj's first single, "Oxygen", was released to radio in early 2002 and peaked at No. 25 on the ARIA Singles Chart in April. It was followed by "Never Be Amazing", which reached the Top 40 in August. His third single, "God Only Knows", also reached the top 40, in February 2003. His debut album, Wrong Place, Wrong Time, reached No. 53 on the ARIA Albums Chart.

In December 2003, Franj provided "I Want to Wake Up with You" for the soundtrack of the Australian comedy film, The Wannabes.

Vanessa Amorosi released "Perfect" in April 2008, the second single from her second studio album, Somewhere in the Real World. It was co-written by Franj with Amorosi and peaked at No. 4. By the end of that year it was certified platinum for shipment of 70,000 units. At the APRA Music Awards of 2009 "Perfect" was nominated for Most Played Australian Work.

== Discography ==
=== Albums ===
List of albums, with selected chart positions
Title	Album details	Peak chart positions
Title	Album details	AUS
Wrong Place, Wrong Time...	Released: March 2003; Format: CD; Label: Standard (STD1203)	98

=== Singles ===
List of singles, with selected chart positions
Title	Year	Peak chart positions	Album
Title	Year	AUS	Album
"Oxygen"	2002	25	Wrong Place, Wrong Time...
"Never Been Amazing"	2002	33	Wrong Place, Wrong Time...
"God Only Knows"	2003	37	Wrong Place, Wrong Time...
"Teresa"/"Yellow Flowers"	2003	—	Wrong Place, Wrong Time...
"I Want to Wake Up with You"	2003	—	The Wannabes
