= Somewhere in the Real World =

Studio album by Vanessa Amorosi
- Released: 24 May 2008
- Length: 50:04
- Label: Universal Music Australia
- Producer: Ron Aniello

Vanessa Amorosi chronology
| The Best of Vanessa Amorosi (2005) | Somewhere in the Real World (2008) | Hazardous (2009) |

Singles from Somewhere in the Real World
- 1. "Kiss Your Mama!" Released: 8 September 2007; 2. "Perfect" Released: 26 April 2008; 3. "The Simple Things (Something Emotional)" Released: 20 September 2008

Somewhere in the Real World is the third studio album by Australian artist, Vanessa Amorosi. It was released in Australia on 24 May 2008.

== Background ==
The album was recorded in Los Angeles in 2007. Amorosi said "I think this album represents me finally. When I listen to "Absolutely Everybody" and "Shine" now, I sound like a baby, because I was a baby. Somewhere in the Real World represents who I am now and I believe it's still recognisable. You can't change your soul, but I have matured and have had life experiences that brought out these songs I took a long time making sure that every song on the album meant something to me. I wanted it to be one of those albums you buy, where you listen to it from the beginning to the end and it takes you on a journey. Somewhere in the Real World is a journal of what I've been doing." Amorosi explained why her album is titled Somewhere in the Real World saying "As an entertainer and as a person, I am always searching for what is real."

== Singles ==
"Kiss Your Mama!" was released as the first single from the album on 8 September 2007. It reached the top twenty of the ARIA Singles Chart. "Perfect" was released as the album's second single in April 2008. The song peaked at number 4 on the ARIA singles chart, achieved Platinum accreditation and was the most played Australian song on Australian radio for 2008. "Perfect" was used in the Seven Network's promotion for Bionic Woman. "The Simple Things (Something Emotional)" was released as the album's third single in September 2008 and peaked at number 36. Additionally, "Start It" was chosen by the Australian Football League (AFL) to be their theme song in 2008.

== Critical reception ==
Professional ratings
Review scores
| Source | Rating |
|---|---|
| Allmusic | . |

AllMusic editor Matthew Chisling called the album "infectious" and wrote. "Amorosi's impressive vocal range and sexy Anastacia-esque tone carry her to new heights on this versatile, accessible album of slick pop tracks and cooing ballads [...] The album boasts beyond-impressive maturity for a singer/songwriter of such a young age, and Somewhere in the Real World picks up from where her first major album, The Power, left off, establishing a pop star whose grace and maturity reflect dollops of potential. This is a truly impeccable album in terms of balancing credibility, poise, maturity, and all the other things that glorify a true pop artist.".

== Chart performance ==
Somewhere in the Real World was scheduled for release in September 2007, but was delayed due to releases of follow pop artists' Delta Goodrem and Kylie Minogue. It debuted at four on the ARIA Albums Chart, becoming Amorosi's highest-charting album since her debut, The Power.

== Track listing ==
Somewhere in the Real World track listing
| No. | Title | Writer(s) | Producer(s) | Length |
|---|---|---|---|---|
| 1. | "Start It" | Vanessa Amorosi; Ron Aniello | Aniello | 2:55 |
| 2. | "Perfect" | Amorosi; David Franj | Clif Magness | 4:47 |
| 3. | "A Little Love" | Amorosi; David Tyson | Greg Wells | 3:53 |
| 4. | "Kiss Your Mama!" | Amorosi; Aniello; David Kopp; Silya Nymoen | Aniello | 3:07 |
| 5. | "The Simple Things (Something Emotional)" | Amorosi; Pam Reswick | Aniello | 4:30 |
| 6. | "Somewhere in the Real World" | Amorosi; Aniello | Aniello | 4:30 |
| 7. | "19 Turning Point" | Amorosi; Magness | Magness | 3:41 |
| 8. | "Send Me the Manual" | Amorosi; Reswick | Wells | 3:19 |
| 9. | "I Thought We'd Stay Together" | Amorosi; Aniello | Aniello | 3:10 |
| 10. | "My House" | Amorosi; Reswick | Wells | 3:31 |
| 11. | "My Problem Is You" | Amorosi; Adrian Hannan; Barbara Hannan; Abby "Skye" Loidl | David Tyson | 4:06 |
| 12. | "I Want Your Fire" | Amorosi; Aniello | Aniello | 3:14 |
| 13. | "Who Am I?" | Amorosi; Josh Abrahams | Aniello | 5:21 |

iTunes bonus track
| No. | Title | Writer(s) | Producer(s) | Length |
|---|---|---|---|---|
| 14. | "Perfect" (Acoustic) | Amorosi; Franj | Clif Magness | 5:54 |

== Charts ==
=== Weekly charts ===
Weekly chart performance for Somewhere in the Real World
| Chart (2008) | Peak position |
|---|---|
| Australian Albums (ARIA) | 4 |

=== Year-end charts ===
Year-end chart performance for Somewhere in the Real World
| Chart (2008) | Position |
|---|---|
| Australian Albums Chart | 69 |
| Australian Artist Albums Chart | 17 |

== Certifications ==
Certifications for Somewhere in the Real World
| Region | Certification | Certified units/sales |
|---|---|---|
| Australia (ARIA) | Gold | 35,000^{^} |
^{^} Shipments figures based on certification alone.

== Release history ==
Release history for Somewhere in the Real World
| Region | Date | Label | Catalogue | Ref. |
|---|---|---|---|---|
| Australia | 24 May 2008 | Universal Music Australia | CD 1720309 | |
