= Turn to Me =

Compilation album by Vanessa Amorosi
- Released: 29 October 2001
- Label: Transistor Music; CBK Produktions; BMG Australia
- Producer: Axel Breitung; Adrian Hannan; Barbara Graham

Vanessa Amorosi chronology
The Power (2000)	Turn to Me (2001)	Change (2002)

Singles from Turn to Me
- 1. "Turn to Me" Released: 3 December 2001

Turn to Me is a compilation album released by Vanessa Amorosi in 2001. The packaging contains bonus multi-media components "Have a Look" (German video), "Shine" (UK video) and a hidden video of "The Power" (Oz Outtakes) which is not credited on the insert. Also included is a photo gallery and screen saver.

Turn to Me contained both new original tracks (Tracks 1, 2, 4, 6, 8, 9, 10) as well as a compilation of tracks that were unreleased in Australia along with remixes of popular songs from both "Turn to Me" and "The Power". It also includes Vanessa's new cover of "Get Here", which she first covered as a promotional single in 1998 for Sydney Central Plaza. "Rise Up" was covered by the final 12 of the first season of Australian Idol in 2003, and reached number one on the ARIA Singles Chart.

== Chart performance ==
Turn to Me peaked at number 21 on the Australian Albums Chart.

== Track listing ==
Turn to Me track listing
No.	Title	Writer(s)	Producer(s)	Length
1.	"Turn to Me"	Vanessa Amorosi; Paul Cecchinelli; Rod Bustos	Axel Breitung	3:38
2.	"Rise Up"	Amorosi; Breitung; Holden; Shane Monopoli	Breitung	3:22
3.	"Steam"	Amorosi; Breitung; Holden	Breitung	3:47
4.	"Take Me as I Am"	Amorosi; Barbara Graham	Adrian Hannan; Graham	3:14
5.	"Every Time I Close My Eyes"	Amorosi; Holden; Wiltshire	Breitung	4:03
6.	"Tent by the Sea"	Amorosi	Hannan; Graham	2:57
7.	"Get Here"	Brenda Russell	Breitung	3:47
8.	"Sun's Up"	Amorosi; Graham	Hannan; Graham	3:32
9.	"By My Side"	Mark Holden	Hannan; Graham	3:30
10.	"Heroes Live Forever"	John Gillard; Trevor White	Wiltshire	4:35
11.	"Turn to Me" (Alternative Version)	Amorosi; Cecchinelli; Bustos	Breitung	3:38
12.	"Rise Up" (Alternative Version)	Amorosi; Breitung; Holden; Monopoli	Breitung	3:38
13.	"Absolutely Everybody" (UK Mix)	Anthony Hicks; Holden; James Ingram	Breitung	3:32

== Charts ==
Chart performance for Turn to Me
Chart (2001)	Peak position
Australian Albums (ARIA)	21

== Release history ==
Release history for Turn to Me
Region	Date	Label	Catalogue	Ref.
Australia	29 October 2001	CBK Produktions; Transistor Music	CCBK7047	
