= Heavy Lies the Head =

Single by Vanessa Amorosi

from the album Back to Love
- Released: 5 April 2019
- Length: 3:28
- Label: Angel Works Productions, Universal Music Australia
- Songwriter(s): Vanessa Amorosi, Aleena Gibson, Trevor Muzzy
- Producer(s): Aleena Gibson, Trevor Muzzy

Vanessa Amorosi singles chronology
"Amazing" (2011)	"Heavy Lies the Head" (2019)	"Hello Me" (2019)

Music videos
- "Heavy Lies the Head" on YouTube

"Heavy Lies the Head" is a song by Australian singer Vanessa Amorosi, released on 5 April 2019 as the lead single from her forthcoming fifth studio album, Back to Love. Amorosi told the Daily Telegraph: "The song's message is if you're a bad person you need to live with that. I can sleep at night. I'm a big believer in karma. I'd be really bitter if I wasn't. As you get older, you start to let things go and think that life will sort things out."

A snippet of the song was uploaded onto Amorosi's Facebook page on 30 March 2019.

== Background ==
Vanessa Amorosi released her debut single "Have a Look" in 1999, which became a Top 20 hit and went gold in Australia. She recorded four studio albums throughout the 2000s but by 2011, she grew weary of what the industry required. Amorosi said, "I was pretty burnt out, I didn't really evolve for a few years there. I really needed to rejuvenate myself and think about where I wanted to be." In 2011, Amorosi moved to Los Angeles to develop her music career in different ways. In Los Angeles, Amorosi met Dave Stewart of Eurythmics, who heard her voice, decided he wanted to work with her and became her musical mentor. Amorosi and Stewart have been working on the album since April 2015. Amorosi has signed with indie label Angel Works Productions, which is distributed by Universal Music Australia, who will release her first single in almost nine years.

== Charts ==
Chart (2019)	Peak position
Australia Digital Tracks (ARIA)	33
