= The Power (Vanessa Amorosi song) =

2000 single by Vanessa Amorossi

Single by Vanessa Amorosi

from the album The Power
- A-side: "Every Time I Close My Eyes"
- Released: 11 December 2000
- Length: 3:27
- Label: Transistor Music
- Songwriters: Vanessa Amorosi; Paul Wiltshire; Mark Holden; Anthony Hicks
- Producer: Axel Breitung

Vanessa Amorosi singles chronology
"Shine" (2000)	"The Power" / "Every Time I Close My Eyes" (2000)	"Champagne, Champagne" (2001)

"The Power" is the fourth single from Australian recording artist Vanessa Amorosi's debut album, The Power. In Australia, the single was released as a double A-side with "Every Time I Close My Eyes" on 11 December 2000. The single became Amorosi's third consecutive top-10 single on the Australian Singles Chart.

== Track listing ==
Australian CD single

1. "The Power" (single version) – 3:26
2. "Every Time I Close My Eyes" (single version) – 3:45
3. "The Power" (album version) – 3:26
4. "The Power" (Spiced Mix) – 3:26
5. "Absolutely Everybody" (UK club video clip)

== Charts ==
=== Weekly chart ===
Chart (2000–2001)	Peak position
Australia (ARIA) with "Every Time I Close My Eyes"	8

=== Year-end charts ===
Chart (2001)	Position
Australia (ARIA)	87

== Certifications ==
Region	Certification	Certified units/sales
Australia (ARIA)	Gold	35,000^{^}
^{^} Shipments figures based on certification alone.

== Release history ==
Region	Date	Format	Label	Catalogue	Ref.
Australia	11 December 2000	CD	Transistor Music	SCBK645	
