= Back to Love (Vanessa Amorosi album) =

Studio album by Vanessa Amorosi
- Released: 8 November 2019
- Length: 35:33
- Label: Angel Works Productions; Universal Music Australia
- Producer: David Gamson; Aleena Gibson; Jon Lavine; Andrew Lowden; Trevor Muzzy; Jordan Palmer; Albert Van Diemen

Vanessa Amorosi chronology
Hazardous (2009)	Back to Love (2019)	The Blacklisted Collection (2020)

Singles from Back to Love
- 1. "Heavy Lies the Head" Released: 5 April 2019; 2. "Hello Me" Released: 6 September 2019; 3. "Lessons of Love" Released: 7 February 2020

Back to Love is the fifth studio album by the Australian singer-songwriter Vanessa Amorosi. It was released by Angel Works Productions on 8 November 2019. Amorosi's first album in 10 years, it peaked at number 84 on the ARIA Charts.

== Singles ==
"Heavy Lies the Head" was released as the album's lead single on 5 April 2019. The song peaked at number 33 on the ARIA Digital Track Chart.

"Hello Me" was released on 6 September 2019. The song peaked at number 37 on the ARIA Digital Track Chart.

In January 2020, "Lessons of Love" was announced as a competing song in Eurovision - Australia Decides, in an attempt to represent Australia in the Eurovision Song Contest 2020. A single edit version song was released on 7 February, the day before Eurovision - Australia Decides as the album's third single.

== Track listing ==
Back to Love track listings
No.	Title	Writer(s)	Producer(s)	Length
1.	"Hello Me"	Vanessa Amorosi; Erika Ceruti; Aleena Gibson; Trevor Muzzy	Gibson; Muzzy	3:27
2.	"Better Off"	Amorosi; Jordan Palmer; John Roach	Palmer	3:15
3.	"Heavy Lies the Head"	Amorosi; Gibson; Muzzy	Gibson; Muzzy	3:27
4.	"Gimme Your Love"	Amorosi; Gibson; Muzzy	Gibson; Muzzy	3:00
5.	"The Truth Will Set You Free"	Amorosi; Gibson; Muzzy	Gibson; Muzzy	3:09
6.	"Back to Love"	Amorosi; Andrew Lowden	Lowden; Albert van Diemen	3:14
7.	"Run"	Amorosi; Albert Van Diemen	van Diemen	3:19
8.	"Lessons of Love"	Amorosi; Gibson; Muzzy	Gibson; Muzzy	3:10
9.	"BTW"	Amorosi; David Gamson; Roach	Gamson	3:15
10.	"Personal"	Amorosi; Gibson; Muzzy	Gibson; Muzzy	3:06
11.	"Love Me Like You Mean It"	Amorosi; Jon Levine; Sarah Soloway	Levine	3:11
Total length:				35:33

== Charts ==
Chart performance for Back to Love
Chart (2019)	Peak position
Australian Albums (ARIA)	84

== Release history ==
Release history for Back to Love
Region	Date	Format	Label
Australia	8 November 2019	Digital download; streaming	Angel Works Productions; Universal Music Australia
