= City of Angels (Vanessa Amorosi album) =

Studio album by Vanessa Amorosi
- Released: 18 March 2022
- Length: 71:17
- Label: Scream Louder
- Producer: Vanessa Amorosi

Vanessa Amorosi chronology
The Blacklisted Collection (2020)	City of Angels (2022)

Singles from City of Angels
- 1. "City of Angels" Released: 4 February 2022; 2. "Crash Now Burn" Released: 18 March 2022

City of Angels is the seventh studio album by Australian singer-songwriter Vanessa Amorosi. It was released through her own label Scream Louder on 18 March 2022. The album peaked at number 7 on the ARIA Charts, becoming Amorosi's fourth top-ten album and first since Hazardous in 2009. At the 2022 ARIA Music Awards, the album was nominated for Best Soul/R&B Release.

== Background ==
City of Angels is Vanessa's first self-produced album. In speaking with Sydney Sentinel, Amorosi said she considers it the "most Vanessa Amorosi album", saying: "This is going to make people understand who I am." On TV program Sunrise, Amorosi added, "This is the album that I've always wanted to get to people, so it's an exciting time," and one she describes as 'one hundred percent me." Amorosi said she hopes her fans "feel something" and "go through a journey" when they listen to her latest material.

== Reception ==
Danny Waterson from The Sydney Sentinel called the album "a sonically daring song cycle featuring lush production, exquisite musicianship and some of Amorosi's most personal lyrics to date, it's led by gospel-rock and features myriad musical styles, including Middle Eastern instrumentals." Waterson said "one of the standout tracks is the '80s rock-tinged synth anthem 'Muhammad'" and highlighting "the feel[-]good sing-along song 'Take it Easy'".

== Track listing ==
City of Angels track listing
No.	Title	Writer(s)	Producer(s)	Length
1.	"Crash Now Burn"	Vanessa Amorosi; Tony Featherstone	Amorosi	4:36
2.	"Just Let It Go"	Amorosi; Featherstone	Amorosi	4:32
3.	"Everybody Cries Hallelujah"	Amorosi; Rodrigo Bustos	Amorosi	4:14
4.	"Take It Easy" (featuring Lena Byrd Miles)	Amorosi; Featherstone	Amorosi	3:57
5.	"City of Angels"	Amorosi; Featherstone	Amorosi	4:53
6.	"As the World Falls Down"	Amorosi; Featherstone	Amorosi	4:28
7.	"God Didn't Make Us All the Same" (featuring Anthony Evans)	Amorosi; Featherstone	Amorosi	4:46
8.	"Do You Mean What You Say"	Amorosi; Featherstone	Amorosi	4:30
9.	"Muhammad"	Amorosi; Featherstone	Amorosi	3:40
10.	"Human"	Amorosi; Featherstone	Amorosi	3:56
11.	"Are You Happy Now"	Amorosi; Featherstone	Amorosi	3:22
12.	"Lie to Me"	Amorosi; Melissa O'Connor	Amorosi	4:50
13.	"Tell Me Something Good"	Amorosi; Featherstone	Amorosi	4:41
14.	"Ice Cold Heart"	Amorosi; Featherstone	Amorosi	4:02
15.	"You Did a Number On Me"	Amorosi; Bustos	Amorosi	4:48
16.	"Best Days"	Amorosi; Maurice D'Andre Fonville	Amorosi; Fonville	4:36
17.	"I'll Be There"	Amorosi; Featherstone	Amorosi	2:07
Total length:				71:17

== Charts ==
Chart performance for City of Angels
Chart (2020)	Peak position
Australian Albums (ARIA)	7
Australian Independent Albums (AIR)	1

== Release history ==
Release history and formats for City of Angels
Region	Date	Format	Label	Catalogue	Ref.
Australia	18 March 2022	CD; digital download; streaming	Scream Louder	SLR001	
