= Mr. Mysterious =

Single by Vanessa Amorosi featuring Seany B

from the album Hazardous
- Released: 23 April 2010 (Australia)
- Recorded: Fishhead Music Studios, Gothenburg, Sweden
- Genre: Pop rock, electropop, dance-pop
- Label: Universal
- Songwriters: Vanessa Amorosi, MachoPsycho (Robin Lynch & Niklas Olovson)

Vanessa Amorosi singles chronology
"Hazardous" (2009)	"Mr. Mysterious" (2010)	"Holiday" (2010)

Music videos
- "Mr. Mysterious" on YouTube

"Mr. Mysterious" is a song by Australian recording artist Vanessa Amorosi featuring Seany B, who is best known for being the performer of the TV Rock hit "Flaunt It". "Mr. Mysterious" was released in April 2010 as the third single from Amorosi's fourth studio album Hazardous.

Amorosi describes the song as "a cheeky track about the guy you know nothing about but you can't get out of your head".

Before release as a digital single, the song was used in the ads by the Network Ten for the British television drama series Merlin.

== Promotion ==
"Mr. Mysterious" was first performed live on TV at the 2009 Perth Telethon on 3 October 2009. Amorosi filmed the video for "Mr. Mysterious" in February 2010.

In 2010, Amorosi performed "Mr. Mysterious" on Hey Hey It's Saturday.

== Music video ==
The video clip for "Mr. Mysterious" was shot in February by director Stuart Gosling. Gosling's Motion Cubism FX is used intensively throughout the video creating a fluid and mesmerising visual performance. Digital Pictures spent three weeks of post production to get the FX right. The video premiered on The Today Show and on Mornings with Kerri-Anne on 26 March 2010.

== Track listing ==
Music download
Preorder 'Single'

1. "Mr. Mysterious" (Single version)
2. "Mr. Mysterious" (Dance Dude Macho Club Mix)

GetMusic

1. "Mr. Mysterious" (Single version)
2. "This Is Who I Am" (The Lonewolf version)

iTunes

1. "Mr. Mysterious" (feat. Seany B) — 3:45
2. "Hazardous" (Kill Bill version)— 5:14

== Charts ==
=== Weekly charts ===
Chart (2009)	Peak position
Australia (ARIA)	4

=== Year-end chart ===
Chart (2010)	Position
Australia (ARIA)	80

== Certifications ==
Region	Certification	Certified units/sales
Australia (ARIA)	Platinum	70,000^{^}
^{^} Shipments figures based on certification alone.

== Release history ==
Region	Date	Label	Catalogue
Australia	April 2010	Universal Music Australia	2737405
