= Loco (Joel Fletcher song) =

Single by Joel Fletcher and Seany B
- Released: 28 March 2014
- Recorded: 2013
- Genre: Electro house
- Length: 3:22 (radio edit)
- Label: Ministry of Sound Australia
- Songwriters: Joel Fletcher, Sean Berchik, Luke Calleja, Tanya Prasida

Joel Fletcher singles chronology
"Swing" (2013)	"Loco" (2014)	"Back 2 Front" (2014)

Seany B singles chronology
"Kill the Robots" (2013)	"Loco" (2014)	"Killin It" (2015)

"Loco" is a song recorded by Australian producer Joel Fletcher and features the vocals of Seany B. The song was digitally released on 28 March 2014.

== Background ==
Following the success of Fletcher's triple platinum-selling single "Swing" featuring Savage, Fletcher teamed up with fellow Melbournite Seany B to produce the follow-up "Loco".

== Track listing ==
- Digital download
1. "Loco" – 3:22
- Digital download (remixes)
1. "Loco" (Vinai Remix) – 3:18
2. "Loco" (Tom Size Festival Trap Remix) – 2:53
3. "Loco" (Combo Remix) – 4:48
4. "Loco" (Kronic Remix) – 3:52

== Weekly charts ==
"Loco" debuted on the ARIA singles chart at #13 on the 13th of April 2014.

Chart (2014)	Peak position
Australia (ARIA)	13

=== Year-end chart ===
Chart (2014)	Rank
Australian Artist Singles Chart	39

== Certification ==
Region	Certification	Certified units/sales
Australia (ARIA)	Gold	35,000^{^}
^{^} Shipments figures based on certification alone.
