= Hello Me =

Single by Vanessa Amorosi

from the album Back to Love
- Released: 6 September 2019
- Length: 3:27
- Label: Angel Works Productions, Universal Music Australia
- Songwriters: Vanessa Amorosi, Aleena Gibson, Trevor Muzzy, Erika Ceruti
- Producers: Aleena Gibson, Trevor Muzzy

Vanessa Amorosi singles chronology
"Heavy Lies the Head" (2019)	"Hello Me" (2019)

Music videos
- "Hello Me" on YouTube

"Hello Me" is a song by the Australian singer Vanessa Amorosi, released on 6 September 2019 as the second single from her fifth studio album, Back to Love. Amorosi performed the song live on Sunrise on 9 September 2019.

Amorosi said the song is a "raw, intimate song about setting boundaries and making choices".

== Charts ==
Chart (2019)	Peak position
Australia Digital Tracks (ARIA)	37
