= Rise Up (Vanessa Amorosi song) =

2001 song by Vanessa Amorosi

Song by Vanessa Amorosi

from the album Turn to Me
- Released: 2001
- Length: 3:22
- Label: Transistor Music; CBK Produktions
- Songwriters: Vanessa Amorosi; Axel Breitung; Mark Holden; Shane Monopoli
- Producer: Axel Breitung

"Rise Up" is a song written by Vanessa Amorosi, Axel Breitung, Mark Holden and Shane Monopoli, originally recorded by Amorosi for her second album, Turn to Me (2001).

== Australian Idol 2003 cover ==
"Rise Up"

Single by Australian Idol – The Final 12

from the album Australian Idol: The Final 12 – Cast Album
- B-side: "Movin' On"
- Released: 13 October 2003
- Recorded: 2003
- Length: 3:48
- Label: BMG
- Songwriters: Vanessa Amorosi; Axel Breitung; Mark Holden; Shane Monopoli
- Producers: Axel Breitung; Mark Holden

In 2003, the song was performed by the top 12 finalists of the first season of the reality series Australian Idol, on which Holden served as a judge. This version was released as a single in Australia on 13 October 2003. It reached number one on Australia's ARIA Singles Chart and stayed on top for three weeks.

=== Charts ===
==== Weekly charts ====
Weekly chart performance for "Rise Up"
Chart (2003)	Peak position
Australia (ARIA)	1

==== Year-end charts ====
Year-end chart performance for "Rise Up"
Chart (2003)	Position
Australia (ARIA)	63

=== Certifications ===
Certifications for "Rise Up"
Region	Certification	Certified units/sales
Australia (ARIA)	Gold	35,000^{^}
^{^} Shipments figures based on certification alone.
