= Turn to Me (song) =

Single by Vanessa Amorosi

from the album Turn to Me
- Released: 3 December 2001
- Length: 3:36
- Label: Transistor
- Songwriters: Vanessa Amorosi; Paul Cecchinelli; Rod Bustos
- Producer: Axel Breitung

Vanessa Amorosi singles chronology
"Champagne, Champagne" (2001)	"Turn to Me" (2001)	"One Thing Leads 2 Another" (2002)

"Turn to Me" is a song by Australian singer-songwriter, Vanessa Amorosi, released in December 2001 as the lead single from her second album, Turn to Me. The song peaked at number 80 on the Australian ARIA Singles Chart.

== Track listing ==
CD single

1. "Turn to Me" (Single Version) – 3:36
2. "Turn to Me" (Alternative Version) – 3:37
3. "Turn to Me" (Extended Version) – 5:34
4. "Turn to Me" (Animated Video Clip) – 3:43

== Charts ==
Chart (2001)	Peak position
Australia (ARIA)	80

== Release history ==
Region	Date	Label	Catalogue
Australia	3 December 2001	Transistor	SCBK656
