= Holiday (Vanessa Amorosi song) =

Single by Vanessa Amorosi

from the album Hazardous
- Released: 13 August 2010
- Recorded: Fishhead Music Studios, Gothenburg, Sweden
- Genre: Dance-pop
- Label: Universal
- Songwriter(s): Vanessa Amorosi, MachoPsycho (Robin Lynch & Niklas Olovson)
- Producer(s): MachoPsycho

Vanessa Amorosi singles chronology
"Mr. Mysterious" (2010)	"Holiday" (2010)	"Gossip" (2011)

Music videos
- "Holiday" on YouTube

"Holiday" is a song by Australian recording artist, Vanessa Amorosi. "Holiday" was released in Australia as the fourth and final single from Amorosi's fourth studio album Hazardous (2009). It was digitally released on 13 August 2010.

On Sunday, 22 August 2010 Amorosi performed the song as special guest live on the Australian light entertainment reality show "Dancing with the Stars" on Channel Seven.

Amorosi said "Holiday' is one of her favourite tracks on the album: Holiday is inspired by a fantasy of escaping to a far off island, warm weather, with sand at my feet, partying all night and dancing till dawn".

The accompanying video was shot in the UK and directed by Dan Ruttley.

== Track listing ==
Music download – EP

1. "Holiday" – 3:16
2. "Holiday" (Buzz Junkies remix) [Radio edit] – 3:51
3. "Mr. Mysterious" (Dance Dude Macho Psycho remix) – 4:09

== Charts ==
Chart (2010)	Peak position
Australia (ARIA)	42

== Release history ==
Country	Release date	Format	Label
Australia	12 July 2010	Radio	Universal
Australia	13 August 2010	Digital single	Universal
