= The Simple Things (Something Emotional) =

Single by Vanessa Amorosi

from the album Somewhere in the Real World
- Released: 20 September 2008
- Recorded: 2008
- Genre: Soul/Rock
- Length: 4:30
- Label: Universal Music
- Songwriter(s): Vanessa Amorosi, Pam Reswick
- Producer(s): Pam Reswick

Vanessa Amorosi singles chronology
"Perfect" (2008)	"The Simple Things (Something Emotional)" (2008)	"The Letter" (2009)

"The Simple Things (Something Emotional)" is a song by Australian recording artist Vanessa Amorosi, released in September 2008 as the third and final single from Amorosi's third studio album Somewhere in the Real World.

Amorosi performed the song on the Australian Idol live decider on 29 September 2008.

== Track listing ==
#	"The Simple Things (Something Emotional)"	Time
1.	"The Simple Things (Something Emotional)" (Radio version)	03:35
2.	"The Simple Things (Something Emotional)" (Album version)	04:30
3.	"Hello"	04:15
4.	"Perfect" (T-Funk remix)	03:27
5.	"The Simple Things (Something Emotional)" (Instrumental)	04:33

#	"The Simple Things (Something Emotional)" (iTunes Digital Single)	Time
1.	"The Simple Things (Something Emotional)" (Radio version)	3:35
2.	"Perfect" (Paolos San Terenzo Remix)	4:00

== Charts ==
Chart (2008)	Peak position
Australia (ARIA)	36

== Release history ==
Region	Date	Label	Catalogue
Australia	September 2008	Universal Music Australia	1781992
