= The Power (album) =

Studio album by Vanessa Amorosi
- Released: 3 April 2000
- Label: CBK; Transistor
- Producer: Axel Breitung; Steve Mac; Paul L. Wiltshire

Vanessa Amorosi chronology
The Power (2000)	Turn to Me (2001)

Singles from The Power
- 1. "Have a Look" Released: 12 July 1999; 2. "Absolutely Everybody" Released: 15 November 1999; 3. "Shine" Released: 15 May 2000; 4. "The Power/Everytime I Close My Eyes" Released: 11 December 2000; 5. "Everytime I Close My Eyes" Released: January 2001

Alternative cover
- International cover

The Power is the debut studio album by Australian pop singer Vanessa Amorosi. It was released on 3 April 2000 on CBK Produktions and Transistor Music Australia. The album debuted at number 1 on the Australian Albums Chart and was certified 4× platinum by the Australian Recording Industry Association (ARIA). An international version was released with different album art and track listing.

== Critical reception ==
Professional ratings
Review scores
Source	Rating
AllMusic	2.5/5 stars
MTV Asia	5/10

AllMusic editor Brendan Swift called The Power a "solid debut release." He found that the album has her flexing "impressive vocals among a range of standard pop, dance, and rock tracks. Her strong and soulful voice doesn't always sound at home among the more lightweight pop [...] The Power is characterized by consistency rather than standout songs – a glimpse of Vanessa Amorosi's promise, rather than the best of Vanessa Amorosi." Irene Kanaris of Melbourne radio station 3FOX-FM called the album "one of the best" Australian pop album in years. Jodie Prudames from MTV Australia found that The Power was "fresh and shows off her great voice."

== Accolades ==
At the ARIA Music Awards of 2000, the album was nominated for two awards: Highest Selling Album and Breakthrough Release.

== Track listing ==
The Power track listing
No.	Title	Writer(s)	Producer(s)	Length
1.	"U R Mine"	Mark Holden; Paul Wiltshire	Axel Breitung	4:15
2.	"Absolutely Everybody"	Anthony Hicks; Holden; James Ingram	Breitung	3:42
3.	"Shine"	Vanessa Amorosi; Holden; Robert Parde	Breitung	3:53
4.	"Have a Look"	Amorosi; Holden; Shaun Imrei	Steve Mac	3:35
5.	"Pray for Love"	Hicks; Holden; Ingram	Breitung	3:35
6.	"Every Time I Close My Eyes"	Amorosi; Holden; Wiltshire	Breitung	3:45
7.	"How Y' Livin'"	Amorosi; Holden; Wiltshire	Breitung	4:01
8.	"The Power"	Amorosi; Hicks; Holden; Ingram	Breitung	3:34
9.	"I Wanna Be Your Everything"	Amorosi; Holden; Imrei	Mac	3:36
10.	"You Were Led On"	Amorosi; Wiltshire	Wiltshire	4:42
11.	"Pray for Love" (Club Mix)	Hicks; Holden; Ingram	Breitung	3:26
12.	"The Power" (Spiced Mix)	Amorosi; Hicks; Holden; Ingram	Breitung	3:33
13.	"Absolutely Everybody" (Latino Mix)	Hicks; Holden; Ingram	Breitung	3:27

International version
No.	Title	Writer(s)	Producer(s)	Length
1.	"U R Mine"	Holden; Wiltshire	Breitung	4:15
2.	"Absolutely Everybody"	Hicks; Holden; Ingram	Breitung	3:42
3.	"Shine"	Amorosi; Holden; Robert Parde	Breitung	3:53
4.	"I Wanna Be Your Everything"	Amorosi; Holden; Imrei	Mac	3:36
5.	"How Y' Livin'"	Amorosi; Holden; Wiltshire	Breitung	4:01
6.	"Every Time I Close My Eyes"	Amorosi; Holden; Wiltshire	Breitung	3:45
7.	"Pray for Love"	Hicks; Holden; Ingram	Breitung	3:35
8.	"The Power"	Amorosi; Hicks; Holden; Ingram	Breitung	3:34
9.	"Steam"	Amorosi; Breitung; Holden	Breitung	3:47
10.	"Turn to Me"	Amorosi; Paul Cecchinelli; Rod Bustos	Breitung	3:36
11.	"You Were Led On"	Amorosi; Wiltshire	Wiltshire	4:42
12.	"Have a Look"	Amorosi; Holden; Imrei	Mac	3:35

International version (Japanese bonus tracks)
No.	Title	Writer(s)	Producer(s)	Length
13.	"Rise Up"	Amorosi; Holden; Breitung; Shane Monopoli	Breitung	3:22
14.	"Second Chance"	Amorosi; Holden; Wiltshire	Breitung	3:40

== Charts ==
=== Weekly charts ===
Weekly chart performance for The Power
Chart (2000–2001)	Peak position
Australian Albums (ARIA)	1
Australian Dance Albums (ARIA)	1
Austrian Albums (Ö3 Austria)	21
German Albums (Offizielle Top 100)	7
Swiss Albums (Schweizer Hitparade)	15

=== Year-end charts ===
Year-end chart performance for The Power
Chart (2000)	Position
Australian Albums (ARIA)	4
Chart (2001)	Position
Australian Albums (ARIA)	54
German Albums (Offizielle Top 100)	39
Swiss Albums (Schweizer Hitparade)	96

=== Decade-end charts ===
Decade-end chart performance for The Power
Chart (2000–2009)	Position
Australian Albums (ARIA)	81

== Certifications ==
Certifications for The Power
Region	Certification	Certified units/sales
Australia (ARIA)	4× Platinum	280,000^{^}
Germany (BVMI)	Gold	150,000^{^}
^{^} Shipments figures based on certification alone.

== Release history ==
Release history for The Power
Region	Date	Label	Catalogue
Australia	3 April 2000	CBK Produktions; Transistor Music	CCBK7042
United Kingdom	2 October 2000	Mercury	159 914-2
Japan	18 October 2000	Transistor Music	UICO 2002
Germany	27 November 2000	Island; Universal Music	159 409-2

== See also ==
- List of number-one albums of 2000 (Australia)
- List of top 25 albums for 2000 in Australia
