= Perfect (Vanessa Amorosi song) =

2008 single by Vanessa Amorossi

Single by Vanessa Amorosi

from the album Somewhere in the Real World
- Released: 26 April 2008
- Recorded: 2008
- Genre: Soul, rock
- Length: 4:47 (album version); 3:20 (radio edit)
- Label: Universal Music
- Songwriters: David Franj, Vanessa Amorosi
- Producer: Clif Magness

Vanessa Amorosi singles chronology
"Kiss Your Mama!" (2007)	"Perfect" (2008)	"The Simple Things (Something Emotional)" (2008)

"Perfect" is a song by Australian recording artist Vanessa Amorosi. "Perfect" was released in April 2008 as the second single from Amorosi's third studio album, Somewhere in the Real World.

Amorosi co-wrote "Perfect" with Australian songwriter David Franj

"Perfect" was the most played song by an Australian artist on the 2008 National Airplay Chart (The Music Network – 22 December 2008). The track also hit number one on the Australian iTunes Store on 6 June 2008.

Before release as a single, "Perfect" was featured in promotions by the Seven Network for the American show Bionic Woman. It will also be used in a commercial campaign for jeans by Calvin Klein in Australia.

== Awards and nominations ==
Year	Ceremony	Category	Result
2009	APRA Awards	Most Played Australian Work	Nominated

== Track listings ==
CD single/digital EP

1. "Perfect" — 04:49
2. "Perfect" (Radio version) — 03:20
3. "Perfect" (Soulful version) — 06:09
4. "Perfect" (Instrumental) — 04:52

iTunes single

1. "Perfect" — 04:49
2. "(You Make Me Feel Like) A Natural Woman" (Live from Bluesfest 2007) — 05:17

== Charts ==
=== Weekly chart ===
Chart (2008)	Peak position
Australia (ARIA)	4

=== Year-end charts ===
Chart (2008)	Position
Australia (ARIA)	35

== Certifications ==
Region	Certification	Certified units/sales
Australia (ARIA)	Platinum	70,000^{^}
^{^} Shipments figures based on certification alone.

== Release history ==
Region	Date	Label	Catalogue	Ref.
Australia	26 April 2008	Universal Music Australia	1763772	
