= Hazardous (album) =

Studio album by Vanessa Amorosi
- Released: 6 November 2009
- Recorded: Fishhead Music Studios, Gothenburg, Sweden; The Lab, Los Angeles
- Genres: Pop rock, Electropop
- Label: Universal Music Australia
- Producer: MachoPsycho

Vanessa Amorosi chronology
| Somewhere in the Real World (2008) | Hazardous (2009) | Back to Love (2019) |

Singles from Hazardous
- 1. "This Is Who I Am" Released: 9 October 2009; 2. "Hazardous" Released: 11 December 2009; 3. "Mr. Mysterious" Released: 23 April 2010; 4. "Off on My Kiss" Released: 24 May 2010; 5. "Holiday" Released: 13 August 2010

Hazardous is the fourth studio album by Vanessa Amorosi, released in Australia on 6 November 2009 to critical and commercial success, debuting at number 7 on the ARIA Albums Chart and Gold accreditation in Australia. The album's lead single, "This Is Who I Am", became Amorosi's first and only number one-charting single, reaching number 1 on the ARIA Singles Chart in its first week of release.

== Background ==
Hazardous was released in November 2009, less than 18 months after her previous studio album, Somewhere in the Real World. On working with songwriting team Machopsycho, she said: "It was literally pouring out of us. It's such a crazy thing when you have the right magic and chemistry going on – the songs tend to write themselves and really quickly."

"This album is so raw and edgy and out-there... it might scare people who've bought my albums in the past," she said. "The whole album is all the stuff I've never wanted to talk about, and I've only now had the courage to put it out there. I had a lot to say with this album, that's why it came so quickly. I think a lot of people thought I'd take my time again, which I was nervous about. We were going to head to Europe with the last album, but then it would've been another two years, and people would've thought 'I'm tired of buying her records, she pisses off after each one'."

Compared to the more soul and soft rock-influenced pop of Somewhere in the Real World, Hazardous features a more electropop and pop-rock sound. The album notably is Amorosi's first to feature a rap verse in one of her songs, that being Seany B's appearance in "Mr. Mysterious".

== Singles ==
- "This Is Who I Am"

Released in October 2009, the song debuted at number 1 on the Australian Singles Chart, becoming Amorosi's first-ever number one single. It spent two weeks atop the chart, and has been certified 2× platinum for sales in excess of 140,000 copies.

- "Hazardous"

Released in December 2009, the song peaked at number 29 on the Australian Singles Chart.

- "Mr. Mysterious"

"Mr. Mysterious" was released in April as the album's third single. It debuted at number 65, eventually rising up the charts. On 9 May 2010, "Mr. Mysterious" had peaked at the position of number 4 on the Australian Singles Chart.

- "Off on My Kiss"

Released as a digital single on 14 May 2010 in the UK. It includes an additional remix; "Off on My Kiss" (Buzz Junkies Remix).

- "Holiday"

"Holiday" was released in Australia on 13 August 2010.

== Critical reception ==
Professional ratings
Review scores
| Source | Rating |
|---|---|
| AllMusic | 4/5 stars |

Matthew Chisling of AllMusic lauded Hazardous, calling it "ruthless and exciting", and Amorosi's vocals "roof-raising". He also noted the album's mainstream sound, pointing out how the album was "even more radio accessible [than Somewhere in the Real World]", and said that "It's no surprise that any of the tracks could be as popular as the two first singles". Whilst he felt the album's upbeat sound "impedes on the presence of ballads as beautiful as Amorosi's previous number one single, "Perfect", he felt the album complemented Somewhere in the Real World as "two parts of a glorious release".

== Track listing ==
Hazardous track listing
| No. | Title | Writer(s) | Producer(s) | Length |
|---|---|---|---|---|
| 1. | "This Is Who I Am" | Vanessa Amorosi; MachoPsycho | MachoPsycho | 3:25 |
| 2. | "Mr. Mysterious" (featuring Seany B) | Amorosi; MachoPsycho | MachoPsycho | 4:00 |
| 3. | "Holiday" | Amorosi; MachoPsycho | MachoPsycho | 3:17 |
| 4. | "Hazardous" | Stefanie Ridel; Stuart Crichton; Thomas James | MachoPsycho | 3:26 |
| 5. | "Off on My Kiss" | Amorosi; MachoPsycho | MachoPsycho | 3:31 |
| 6. | "Show Me How to Love" | Amorosi; Pam Reswick | MachoPsycho | 4:04 |
| 7. | "Aliens and U.F.O.s" | Amorosi; MachoPsycho | MachoPsycho | 3:15 |
| 8. | "Summer Nights" | Amorosi; MachoPsycho | MachoPsycho | 2:53 |
| 9. | "Touch Me" | Amorosi; MachoPsycho | MachoPsycho | 3:05 |
| 10. | "Baby's on Ice" | Amorosi; MachoPsycho | MachoPsycho | 3:32 |
| 11. | "Sleep with That" | Amorosi; MachoPsycho | Matthew Gerrard | 3:26 |
| 12. | "Higher Ground" | Amorosi; Reswick | MachoPsycho | 3:50 |
| 13. | "Blow Me Away" | Amorosi; Gerrard; Steve Diamond | Gerrard | 3:32 |
| 14. | "Snitch" (featuring Vince Colosimo) | Amorosi; MachoPsycho | MachoPsycho | 3:27 |

Australian iTunes edition
| No. | Title | Writer(s) | Producer(s) | Length |
|---|---|---|---|---|
| 15. | "This Is Who I Am" (Macho Psycho Euro Tech Remix) | Amorosi; MachoPsycho | MachoPsycho | 4:02 |

English iTunes edition
| No. | Title | Writer(s) | Producer(s) | Length |
|---|---|---|---|---|
| 16. | "Off on My Kiss" (Buzz Junkies Remix) | Amorosi; MachoPsycho | MachoPsycho; Buzz Junkies (add.) | 3:30 |

== Personnel ==
- Produced by MachoPsycho. Recorded at Fishhead studios, Gothenburg, Sweden
- Track 11 and 13 produced by Matthew Gerrard. Recorded at The Lab, Los Angeles
- Vocals on track 6 and 12 recorded by Pam Reswick
- Mixed by Chris Lord Alge at Mix L.A. studios, Los Angeles
- Mastered by Tom Sterling at Sterling sound, New York City
- A&R: Ralph Carr
- Executive producers: Ralph Carr and Vanessa Amorosi
- Management: Ralph Carr for RCM
- Photography and art: Pierre Baroni

== Charts ==
=== Weekly charts ===
Weekly chart performance for Hazardous
| Chart (2009–2010) | Peak position |
|---|---|
| Australian Albums (ARIA) | 7 |

=== Year-end charts ===
Year-end chart performance for Hazardous
| Chart (2009) | Position |
|---|---|
| Australian Albums (ARIA) | 78 |
| Australian Artist Albums (ARIA) | 22 |
| Chart (2010) | Position |
| Australian Albums (ARIA) | 70 |
| Australian Artist Albums (ARIA) | 20 |

== Certifications ==
Certifications for Hazardous
| Region | Certification | Certified units/sales |
|---|---|---|
| Australia (ARIA) | Gold | 35,000^{^} |
^{^} Shipments figures based on certification alone.

== Release history ==
Release history for Hazardous
| Region | Date | Format | Label | Catalogue | Ref. |
|---|---|---|---|---|---|
| Australia | 6 November 2009 | Digital download; CD | Universal | 2724567 | |
| Germany | 13 July 2010 | Digital download | Universal | 2724567 | |
| Germany | 23 July 2010 | CD | Universal | 2724567 | |
| United Kingdom | 26 July 2010 | Digital download; CD | Island | 2724567 | |
