= Gossip (Vanessa Amorosi song) =

Single by Vanessa Amorosi

from the album V (Unreleased)
- Released: 1 July 2011 (Australia)
- Genre: Pop rock, electropop, dance-pop
- Label: Universal
- Songwriters: Vanessa Amorosi, MachoPsycho (Robin Lynch & Niklas Olovson)
- Producer: Machopsycho

Vanessa Amorosi singles chronology
"Holiday" (2010)	"Gossip" (2011)	"Amazing" (2011)

Music videos
- "Gossip" on YouTube

"Gossip" was digitally released on 1 July 2011. It was slated to be the first single from Vanessa Amorosi's fifth studio album, V, but the album was not released due to poor sales of this and her subsequent single "Amazing". The song peaked at number 113 on the ARIA chart.

The song "Gossip" was inspired by nights out partying in London where the girls gossiped in the nightclub bathrooms on websites like Facebook. "These days people are no longer giving out their phone numbers, they are giving out their Facebook names", Amorosi explained. The video clip for "Gossip" was filmed at Melbourne's Labassa mansion by director Stuart Gosling.

== Track listing ==
Music download

1. "Gossip" – 3:02

CD single (Cat.No. 2778619)

1. "Gossip" – 3:02
2. "Gossip" (Macho Psycho Alternate Radio Mix) – 3:59
3. "Gossip" (Buzz Junkies Remix) – 3:17
4. "Gossip" (Buzz Junkies Club Mix) – 5:08

Buzz Junkies Remix Single

1. "Gossip" (Buzz Junkies Remix) – 3:17

== Charts ==
The song was the #1 most added track to Australian radio for the week commencing 11 July 2011.

Chart (2011)	Peak position
Australia (ARIA)	113
Australian Airplay Chart	28

== Release history ==
Country	Release date	Format	Label	Catalogue
Australia	1 July 2011	Digital single	Universal	
Australia	5 August 2011	Maxi single CD	Universal	2778619

== Sources ==
- NovaFM Photo Gallery: Behind the scenes of Vanessa Amorosi's "Gossip"
- The Music Network: Vanessa Amorosi aims for social media takeover
- The Music Network: Vanessa Amorosi spreads the Gossip
- SoundCloud: Vanessa Amorosi - Gossip (Stafford Brothers Remix) by staffordbrothers
- SoundCloud: Vanessa Amorosi - Gossip (Buzz Junkies Remix) by buzzjunkies
