= Kiss Your Mama! =

Single by Vanessa Amorosi

from the album Somewhere in the Real World
- Released: September 8, 2007
- Recorded: 2007
- Genre: Pop rock
- Length: 3:07
- Label: Universal
- Songwriter(s): Ron Aniello; David Kopp; Silya Nymoen; Vanessa Amorosi
- Producer(s): Ron Aniello

Vanessa Amorosi singles chronology
"True To Yourself" (2003)	"Kiss Your Mama!" (2007)	"Perfect" (2008)

"Kiss Your Mama!" is a song by Australian recording artist Vanessa Amorosi. The song was released in September 2007 as the lead single from Amorosi's third studio album Somewhere in the Real World. The single was serviced to radio on 3 August 2007, with a commercial 2-track single released 8 September 2007.

"Kiss Your Mama!" is a nu-skool guitar rock groove with a blend of vintage soul. Vanessa co-wrote "Kiss Your Mama!", inspired by the belief of her gal pals that a guy who shows respect to his mother will treat his lady loves right too.

The video was shot in Melbourne with London director Stuart Gosling (Good Charlotte, Roni Size, Feeder). Says Vanessa.. "I wanted it based around a performance - with no acting or showing much skin to be sexy. I feel sexy onstage anyway. We shot it in an old building which had an amazing vibe inside.

== Track listing ==
#	"Kiss Your Mama!"	Time
1.	"Kiss Your Mama!"	3:07
2.	"Dirty Face"	3:31

#	"Kiss Your Mama!" (iTunes Digital Single)	Time
1.	"Kiss Your Mama!"	3:07
2.	"Kiss Your Mama!" (Tommy Trash Remix)	6:08

== Charts ==
Chart (2007)	Peak position
Australia (ARIA)	15

== Release history ==
Region	Date	Label	Catalogue
Australia	8 September 2007	Universal Music Australia	1744857
