= The Blacklisted Collection =

Studio album by Vanessa Amorosi
- Released: 26 June 2020
- Length: 50:22
- Label: Self-released

Vanessa Amorosi chronology
Back to Love (2019)	The Blacklisted Collection (2020)	City of Angels (2022)

Singles from The Blacklisted Collection
- 1. "Coming Down Off You" Released: 30 March 2020; 2. "Sweet Mirage" Released: 6 April 2020; 3. "15,000 Revs" Released: 13 April 2020; 4. "Isolation" Released: 20 April 2020; 5. "Crazy Jealous" Released: 27 April 2020; 6. "Devil Monster" Released: 4 May 2020; 7. "Make Love Not War" Released: 11 May 2020; 8. "I Don't Know How to Be Happy" Released: 18 May 2020; 9. "The Light" Released: 25 May 2020

The Blacklisted Collection is the sixth studio album by Australian singer-songwriter Vanessa Amorosi. It was released on 26 June 2020 and is Amorosi's first independent release.

== Background ==
The album features re-recorded songs and demos that were not included on previous albums. Speaking to The Music Network, Amorosi commented on the decision to release these tracks, stating, "It's interesting why they might not have been included: didn't the sound work? Were the lyrics too intense? Didn't it make sense for them to be included on a pop record?" She described releasing the collection as "so liberating for me because I'd been wanting to get these songs out for such a long time." The album also includes some songs that were written and released within a week.

== Promotion ==
The album was launched through an exclusive one-night event, live-streamed on 27 June 2020 via the online platform Tix Presents. The Blacklisted Collection was preceded by nine singles, which were released weekly in the lead-up to the album's release. Amorosi commented on this rapid release schedule, stating, "Now that we have released nine singles every Monday I can understand why it is not done. Because it is really hard."

== Reception ==
Christie Eliezer of The Music Network described The Blacklisted Collection as "Amorosi's most compelling record to date, one which provides what she calls 'a missing link' to her art, and underlines her grasp for melodies and turning stories into narrative and anthemic arcs." Eliezer noted that the album's mood "shifts from the radio-friendly '15,000 Revs' to the gorgeous sweet-grooved soul ballads 'Nobody Talks to You Like That' and 'The Last Goodbye' to the thrilling gospel workouts of 'The Light' and 'Sweet Mirage'."

== Track listing ==
The Blacklisted Collection track listing
No.	Title	Writer(s)	Length
1.	"Isolation"		3:45
2.	"15,000 Revs"		3:42
3.	"Devil Monster"		3:10
4.	"Crazy Jealous"		3:36
5.	"The Light"		3:10
6.	"Make Love Not War"		3:05
7.	"Coming Down Off You"		3:19
8.	"Sweet Mirage"		4:13
9.	"Winning"		3:35
10.	"I Don't Know How to Be Happy"		4:09
11.	"The First Step Is Letting Go"		3:36
12.	"Nobody Talks to You Like That"		3:56
13.	"The Last Goodbye"		3:27
14.	"I Go to Sleep" (Kate Ceberano live stream)	Ray Davies	3:39
Total length:			50:22

== Charts ==
Chart performance for The Blacklisted Collection
Chart (2020)	Peak position
Australian Albums (ARIA)	79
Australian Independent Albums (AIR)	6

== Release history ==
Release history for The Blacklisted Collection
Region	Date	Format	Label	Catalogue	Ref.
Australia	26 June 2020	Digital download; streaming	Vanessa Amorosi	VA01	
