= Every Time I Close My Eyes (Vanessa Amorosi song) =

2000 song by Vanessa Amorosi

Single by Vanessa Amorosi

from the album The Power
- A-side: "The Power"
- B-side: "Turn to Me"; "By Your Side"
- Released: 11 December 2000
- Length: 4:04
- Label: Transistor Music
- Songwriters: Vanessa Amorosi; Paul Wiltshire; Mark Holden
- Producer: Axel Breitung

Vanessa Amorosi singles chronology
| "Shine" (2000) | "The Power" / "Every Time I Close My Eyes" (2000) | "Champagne, Champagne" (2001) |

"Every Time I Close My Eyes" is the fifth and final single from Australian recording artist Vanessa Amorosi's debut album, The Power (2000). In Australia, it was released as a double A-side single with "The Power" in December 2000 and peaked at number eight on the ARIA Singles Chart. The following year, "Every Time I Close My Eyes" was released in Japan and Europe, reaching the top 40 in Austria and Germany.

== Track listings ==
Australian CD single

1. "The Power" (single version) – 3:26
2. "Every Time I Close My Eyes" (single version) – 3:45
3. "The Power" (album version) – 3:26
4. "The Power" (Spiced Mix) – 3:26
5. "Absolutely Everybody" (UK club video clip)

Japanese CD single

1. "Every Time I Close My Eyes" (album version)
2. "Every Time I Close My Eyes" (single version)
3. "Absolutely Everybody" (Millennium version)

European CD single

1. "Every Time I Close My Eyes" (single version)
2. "Turn to Me"
3. "By Your Side"
4. "Every Time I Close My Eyes" (album version)

== Charts ==
=== Weekly chart ===
| Chart (2000–2002) | Peak position |
|---|---|
| Australia (ARIA) with "The Power" | 8 |
| Austria (Ö3 Austria Top 40) | 11 |
| Europe (Eurochart Hot 100) | 75 |
| Germany (GfK) | 23 |
| Switzerland (Schweizer Hitparade) | 72 |

=== Year-end charts ===
| Chart (2001) | Position |
|---|---|
| Australia (ARIA) | 87 |

| Chart (2002) | Position |
|---|---|
| Austria (Ö3 Austria Top 40) | 40 |
| Germany (Media Control) | 77 |

== Certifications ==
| Region | Certification | Certified units/sales |
|---|---|---|
| Australia (ARIA) | Gold | 35,000^{^} |
^{^} Shipments figures based on certification alone.

== Release history ==
| Region | Date | Format | Label | Catalogue | Ref. |
|---|---|---|---|---|---|
| Australia | 11 December 2000 | CD | Transistor Music | SCBK645 | |
| Japan | 16 May 2001 | CD | Universal Music Japan | UICO-5507 | |
