= Seany B =

- Birth name: Sean Berchik
- Also known as: Seany B
- Born: 2 January 1980 (age 45); Melbourne, Victoria, Australia
- Genres: Electro house, dance, pop
- Occupation(s): Singer, songwriter, MC, record producer, DJ
- Website: facebook.com/SeanyB.official

Sean Berchik (born 2 January 1980), known professionally as Seany B, is an Australian singer, songwriter, MC, record producer and DJ, who is best known for featuring on TV Rock's 2006 hit "Flaunt It" which topped the ARIA Charts for 5 weeks and went on to win two ARIA Awards for Best Dance Single as well as Highest Selling Single in 2006 as well as featured on Vanessa Amorosi's Mr Mysterious, which peaked at No. 4 in 2010 and was certified platinum. He has toured America and Europe

== Discography ==
=== Singles ===
As lead and featured artist

Title	Year	Peak chart positions	Certifications	Label
Title	Year	AUS	Certifications	Label
"Me Likey" (with Erick Decks)	1999	—	—	Sume Music
"Flaunt It" (TV Rock featuring Seany B)	2006	1	2× Platinum	Sony Music Australia
"Breathe" (Dylan Rhymes & Jono Fernandez featuring Seany B)	2007	—	—	Lot49
"B Good 2 Me"	2008	—	—	Sony Music Australia
"Speaker Freakers" (Stafford Brothers featuring Seany B)	2010	—		Ministry of Sound
"Mr Mysterious" (Vanessa Amorosi featuring Seany B)	2010	4	Platinum	Universal Music Australia
"Rollin' Deep" (with D.O.N.S.)	2010	—	—	Central Station Records
"Gadunk" (Rob Pix featuring Seany B)	2011	—	—	Ministry of Sound
"Everybody Get Up" (with Jam Xpress)	2011	—		OneLove
"Get Stoopid" (with Bombs Away)	2012	—	—	Central Station Records
"Keep Talking" (with Jamie Vlahos)	2013	—	—	OneLove
"Disco Ain't Dead" (with Hoxton Whores)	2013	—	—	Suckmusic
"Kill the Robots" (with Dirt Cheap)	2013	—	—	Bombsquad
"Loco" (with Joel Fletcher)	2014	13	Gold	Ministry of Sound
"Killin It" (with Who Killed Mickey and Zoolanda)	2015	—	—	OneLove
"Bed Springs" (with Sprenda C)	2015	—	—	Downright Recordings
"Me Still Likey" (with Erick Decks)	2015	—	—	Housesessions Records

== Awards ==
Seany B was nominated for three ARIA Music Awards at the 2006 ceremony. He won two both with TV Rock.

Year	Nominee / work	Award	Result
2006	"Flaunt It" TV Rock feat. Seany B	Best Dance Release	Won
2006	"Flaunt It" TV Rock feat. Seany B	Highest Selling Single	Won
