= Champagne, Champagne =

Single by Vanessa Amorosi

from the album Absolument fabuleux
- Released: 28 August 2001
- Genre: Pop
- Length: 2:58
- Label: Universal / Polydor Records
- Songwriter(s): Robert Goldman

Vanessa Amorosi singles chronology
"Every Time I Close My Eyes" (2001)	"Champagne, Champagne" (2001)	"Turn to Me" (2001)

"Champagne, Champagne" is a song by Australian recording artist Vanessa Amorosi. The song was released in France only to promote the French comedy film Absolument fabuleux which was an adaptation of the British television comedy series, Absolutely Fabulous.

== Track listing ==
CD single

1. "Champagne, Champagne" (Radio Edit) - 2:58
2. "Champagne, Champagne" (Album Version) - 4:27

== Release history ==
Region	Date	Label	Catalogue
France	28 August 2001	Universal Music / Polydor	015228-2
