= Hazardous (song) =

Single by Vanessa Amorosi

from the album Hazardous
- Released: 11 December 2009 (Australia)
- Recorded: Fishhead Music Studios, Gothenburg, Sweden
- Genre: Pop rock, electropop, dance-pop
- Label: Universal
- Songwriter(s): V. Amorosi, Stefanie Ridel, Stuart Crichton, T. James

Vanessa Amorosi singles chronology
"This Is Who I Am" (2009)	"Hazardous" (2009)	"Mr. Mysterious" (2010)

Music videos
- "Hazardous" on YouTube

"Hazardous" is the title track and second single from Vanessa Amorosi's fourth studio album Hazardous. "Hazardous" was released on 11 December 2009 in Australia.

== Track listing ==
CD single

1. "Hazardous" – 3:26
2. "This Is Who I Am" (The Lonewolf Version) – 5:54
3. "Hazardous" (The MachoString Remix) – 3:41
4. "Hazardous" (The MotorPsycho Club Remix) – 3:57

== Charts ==
Chart (2009)	Peak position
Australia (ARIA)	29

== Release history ==
Country	Release date	Format	Label	Catalogue
Australia	11 December 2009	CD single, digital download	Universal	2729648
