= Amazing (Vanessa Amorosi song) =

Single by Vanessa Amorosi

from the album V (Unreleased)
- Released: 9 September 2011 (Australia)
- Genre: Pop rock
- Label: Universal
- Songwriter(s): Vanessa Amorosi, Jamie Hartman, Andy Stochansky
- Producer(s): John Fields

Vanessa Amorosi singles chronology
"Gossip" (2011)	"Amazing" (2011)	"Heavy Lies the Head" (2019)

Music videos
- "Amazing" on YouTube

"Amazing" is the second single from Vanessa Amorosi's unreleased fifth studio album V. It was digitally released on 9 September 2011.

Amorosi said that "Amazing" is an empowering and feelgood kind of track, and allows her to keep loved ones top of mind. "The story behind it is I have lost a few family members over the last five years through cancer but you still carry them with you."

The accompanying video for "Amazing" was filmed at Half Moon Bay in Victoria (Australia) and was directed and produced by Stuart Gosling.

On 29 September 2011, Vanessa Amorosi performed with Simple Plan the song "Jet Lag" and her own song "Amazing" live on the AFL Grand Final Footy Show, which was held at Rod Laver Arena in Melbourne. On 6 October 2011, Amorosi appeared on Sunrise and on The Morning Show to perform the song. For the Today Network she also did an acoustic version of her song "Amazing" and a cover of Alanis Morissette's song "Ironic". She also performed the song live on the X Factor results show on 11 October 2011.

== Track listing ==
Music download

1. "Amazing" – 3:33
2. "Soldier Man" – 3:23

Other versions

1. "Amazing" (Almighty Mix) – 6:25 (part of Almighty Essentials: Volume 4)

== Charts ==
The song was the #7 most added track to Australian radio.

Chart (2011)	Peak position
ARIA Singles Chart	83

== Sources ==
- Vimeo: Vanessa Amorosi – "Amazing" official video clip
- Getmusic: Vanessa Amorosi Videos – "Amazing" (Acoustic)
- Vanessa Amorosi – "Ironic" cover (Acoustic)
- Vanessa Amorosi – "Amazing" (Acoustic)
- Vanessa Amorosi's sounds on SoundCloud
