= Shine (Vanessa Amorosi song) =

2000 single by Vanessa Amorosi

Single by Vanessa Amorosi

from the album The Power
- B-side: "Steam"
- Released: 15 May 2000
- Length: 3:52
- Label: Transistor Music
- Songwriters: Vanessa Amorosi; Robert Parde; Mark Holden
- Producer: Axel Breitung

Vanessa Amorosi singles chronology
"Absolutely Everybody" (1999)	"Shine" (2000)	"The Power" / "Everytime I Close My Eyes" (2000)

"Shine" is the third single from Australian singer-songwriter Vanessa Amorosi's debut album, The Power (2000). After its release on 15 May 2000, the ballad debuted and peaked at number four on the Australian Singles Chart and earned a platinum disc from the Australian Recording Industry Association. On 29 January 2001, it was released in Europe, reaching the top 50 in Austria, Germany, and Switzerland. "Shine" won an APRA Award in 2001 for Most Performed Australian Work.

"Shine" was adopted by airline Ansett Australia for their final advertising campaign before the company went bankrupt and had to shut down. "I jinxed them with my song!" Amorosi said. "That was heartbreaking, actually. We had some little goodbye parties and stuff. It was horrible". Mark Holden covered the song in 2004 for his Live at the George Ballroom DVD/EP. In 2023, the song was featured in the film Beau Is Afraid.

== Background ==
The original lyrics to "Shine" were much darker. Mark Holden was responsible for the success of her song "Shine", which Amorosi wrote for a friend from high school who committed suicide. Amorosi says:

"Mark changed a line in it. He said the song didn't work, or that one particular line in it didn't work. The line went 'Everyone you see, everyone you know is gonna die' and he didn't like the word 'die'. He thought it was just wrong. We were all sitting around trying to find a substitute, and we were all stuck on the word 'try'. But Mark came up with the idea of changing it to 'shine' and it all came together. That's Mark's magic. He has a great ear for music. He knows exactly what makes a hit. I think it was a good outcome, because something that was tragic became positive, but... I could never go back to changing it to 'die' now. It is what it is. A lot of my music on The Power was very personal, because I suppose that's what sets me apart from the other songwriters. I'm very blunt and honest with melodies and lyrics. I like to get straight to the point. So I think with "Shine" I tried to make it uplifting but it was very, very personal - and quite an upsetting song."

== Live performances ==
Amorosi sang "Shine" at the Opening Ceremony of the 2000 Sydney Paralympics, which was broadcast in 80 countries. She also performed "Shine" at the 2002 Commonwealth Games closing ceremony in Manchester.

== Track listings ==
Australian CD single

1. "Shine" (radio version) – 3:52
2. "Shine" (extended radio version) – 5:06
3. "Shine" (R&B version) – 3:56
4. "Shine" (extended R&B version) – 5:30
5. "Shine" (unplugged version) – 3:36
6. "Steam" – 3:47

European CD single

1. "Shine" (extended mix radio edit) – 3:56
2. "Shine" – 3:52
3. "Shine" (Tung N Groov remix) – 3:59
4. "Absolutely Everybody" (Sydney 2000 version) – 6:23

== Charts ==
=== Weekly chart ===
Chart (2000–2001)	Peak position
Australia (ARIA)	4
Austria (Ö3 Austria Top 40)	46
Europe (Eurochart Hot 100)	81
Germany (GfK)	38
Poland Airplay (Music & Media)	20
Switzerland (Schweizer Hitparade)	18

=== Year-end charts ===
Chart (2000)	Position
Australia (ARIA)	16

== Certifications ==
Region	Certification	Certified units/sales
Australia (ARIA)	Platinum	70,000^{^}
^{^} Shipments figures based on certification alone.

== Release history ==
Region	Date	Format(s)	Label(s)	Ref.
Australia	15 May 2000	CD	Transistor Music	
Europe	29 January 2001	CD	Universal	
United States	28 August 2001	Contemporary hit radio	Universal	
United States	4 September 2001	Adult contemporary; hot adult contemporary radio	Universal	
