= This Is Who I Am (song) =

2009 single by Vanessa Amorosi

Single by Vanessa Amorosi

from the album Hazardous
- Released: 9 October 2009
- Studio: Fishhead Music (Gothenburg, Sweden)
- Length: 3:25
- Label: Universal
- Songwriters: Vanessa Amorosi, Robin Mortensen Lynch, Niklas "Nikey" Olovson
- Producer: MachoPsycho

Vanessa Amorosi singles chronology
"The Letter" (2009)	"This Is Who I Am" (2009)	""Hazardous"" (2009)

Music video
- "This Is Who I Am" (Official video) on YouTube

"This Is Who I Am" is a song by Australian recording artist Vanessa Amorosi. It was released in Australian on 9 October 2009 as the lead single from Amorosi's fourth studio album Hazardous. The song debuted at number 1 on the ARIA charts; becoming Amorosi's first number one single. When she heard this, Amorosi said "I am completely overwhelmed when I heard 'This Is Who I Am' came in at number one. I am so excited and thrilled to have the support from both the media and my fans. It is my first number one single and I will absolutely treasure this moment."

== Promotion ==
"This Is Who I Am" made its radio debut on the Kyle & Jackie O show on 28 August 2009 on the Fox FM radio station in Melbourne.

On 26 September 2009, Amorosi performed "This Is Who I Am" live on Channel 9's AFL Grand Final Breakfast. On 3 October 2009, Amorosi performed the song during Telethon in Perth.

== Music video ==
The video clip for "This Is Who I Am" was shot in Los Angeles and directed by Christopher R. Watson. The video was shot on green screen and was launched on 14 September 2009.

The video premiered on Take 40 Australia and The Hot Hits' web pages a few days before its official release.

== Track listing ==
CD single

No.	Title	Writer(s)	Length
1.	"This Is Who I Am"	Amorosi, MachoPsycho	3:25
2.	"This Is Who I Am" (Wideboys remix)	Amorosi, MachoPsycho	5:32
3.	"This Is Who I Am" (Wideboys remix – radio edit)	Amorosi, MachoPsycho	3:25
4.	"This Is Who I Am" (Wideboys remix – dub)	Amorosi, MachoPsycho	5:03

== Charts ==
"This Is Who I Am" is Amorosi's first number-one single in Australia. Her single is also the first Australian female artist's single to debut at number one since Kylie Minogue's "2 Hearts" back in 2007, and the first debut number-one single since Flo Rida's "Right Round".

=== Weekly charts ===
Chart (2009)	Peak position
Australia (ARIA)	1

=== Year-end charts ===
Chart (2009)	Position
Australia (ARIA)	30

== Certifications ==
Region	Certification	Certified units/sales
Australia (ARIA)	2× Platinum	140,000^{^}
^{^} Shipments figures based on certification alone.

== Release history ==
Region	Date	Label	Catalogue
Australia	9 October 2009	Universal Music Australia	2719761

== See also ==
- List of number-one singles in Australia in 2009
