= Have a Look =

1999 single by Vanessa Amorossi

Single by Vanessa Amorosi

from the album The Power
- Released: 12 July 1999
- Length: 3:34
- Label: Transistor Music
- Songwriters: Vanessa Amorosi; Mark Holden; Shaun Imrei
- Producer: Steve Mac

Vanessa Amorosi singles chronology
"Have a Look" (1999)	"Absolutely Everybody" (1999)

"Have a Look" is a song by Australian singer-songwriter Vanessa Amorosi, released as her debut single in July 1999. The track was co-written by Amorosi with Australian Idol judge Mark Holden and Shaun Imrei, and it was produced by Steve Mac. The song reached No. 13 on the Australian Singles Chart and achieved gold status in seven weeks.

With a limited budget, its Australian video clip features Amorosi travelling around the Sydney train network and walking around Bondi Junction and Liverpool plaza shopping complex. "Have a Look" was later included on Amorosi's debut album, The Power, in 2000 and was released as the album's third European single the following year, reaching the top 75 in Germany and Switzerland.

== Track listings ==
Australian CD single

1. "Have a Look" (radio mix) – 3:34
2. "Have a Look" (extended mix) – 4:55
3. "Have a Look" (instrumental) – 3:30

European CD single

1. "Have a Look" (7th District radio edit) – 3:47
2. "Have a Look" (album version) – 3:34

European maxi-CD single

1. "Have a Look" (7th District radio edit) – 3:47
2. "Have a Look" (album version) – 3:34
3. "Heroes Live Forever" – 4:31
4. "Rise Up" – 3:36
- A limited-edition version of this maxi-single also contains a video of an acoustic version of "Have a Look" recorded live at MTV.

== Charts ==
=== Weekly chart ===
Chart (1999–2001)	Peak position
Australia (ARIA)	13
Germany (GfK)	73
Switzerland (Schweizer Hitparade)	72

=== Year-end charts ===
Chart (1999)	Position
Australia (ARIA)	64

== Certifications ==
Region	Certification	Certified units/sales
Australia (ARIA)	Gold	35,000^{^}
^{^} Shipments figures based on certification alone.

== Release history ==
Region	Date	Format	Label	Catalogue	Ref.
Australia	12 July 1999	CD	Transistor Music	SCBK606	
Europe	2001	CD	Universal	015 083–2	
Europe	2001	Maxi-CD	Universal	015 030–2	
Europe	2001	Limited-edition maxi-CD	Universal	015 031–2	
