= Trevor Muzzy =

- Origin: San Francisco, CA
- Genres: Pop, Hip-Hop, Pop-Rock, Dance-Pop, Rock, Alternative
- Occupation(s): Mixer, Engineer, Producer, Songwriter, Guitarist, Bassist
- Years active: 2009 - Present
- Website: www.trevormuzzy.com

Trevor Muzzy (born May 22) is an American mixer, producer, songwriter, engineer, guitarist, and bassist, known for his work with Jennifer Lopez, Lady Gaga, Jason Derulo, Pitbull, Alejandro Sanz, and Nicki Minaj. He has engineered and mixed tracks that have gone multi-platinum like “On The Floor” (JLo feat. Pitbull), “Starships” (Nicki Minaj), “Judas” (Lady Gaga), and more.

== Career ==
=== Beginnings ===
Originally from the bay area of California, Trevor Muzzy began his career learning bass guitar as a teen. He continued his studies at The University of California San Diego where he majored in Interdisciplinary Computing In The Arts, with a focus on music. In 2009, Muzzy met RedOne, an international music producer, through a friend, and was hired as an engineer and vocal editor. Muzzy also began playing guitar on songs and eventually began mixing them. During these years he engineered, played on, and mixed songs recorded and released by Lady Gaga, JLo, Pitbull, Enrique Igelsias, Kelly Rowland, Jason Derulo, Nicole Scherizinger, Nicki Minaj, and more.

== Discography ==
=== Notable productions ===
- SonReal - "The Aaron LP" (album), "Have A Nice Day" (single), "Last Year" (single), "Parachutes" (single), "Healing (feat. Jessie Reyez)", "Bank On Me" (single), "Ride" (single)

=== Notable mixes ===
- Alejandro Sanz - "Mi Persona Favorita (feat. Camila Cabello)" (single), "#ElDisco" (album), "No Tengo Nada" (single)
- Ricky Martin - "Tiburones" (single)
- SonReal - "Can I Get A Witness" (single), "No Warm Up" (single)
- Pablo Alborán - Prometo (album)
- Lady Gaga - Born This Way (album), "Angel Down (Work Tape)"
- Nicki Minaj - "Starships" (single), "Pound The Alarm" (single)
- Jennifer Lopez - "On The Floor (feat. Pitbull)" (single), "Love?" (album), "Live It Up (feat. Pitbull)" (single), "A.K.A." (album),
- Jason Derulo - "Fight For You" (single), "Talk Dirty" (album)
- Fonseca - Agustín (album)

== Awards ==
Year	Award Type	Award	Song/Album	Artist	Nomination / Win
2020	GRAMMY	Best Latin Pop Album	#ElDisco	Alejandro Sanz	Win
2019	Latin GRAMMY	Record of the Year	Mi Persona Favorita feat. Camilla Cabello	Alejandro Sanz	Win
2019	Latin GRAMMY	Record of the Year / Song of the Year	No Tengo Nada	Alejandro Sanz	Nomination
2019	Latin GRAMMY	Best Traditional Pop Vocal Album	Augustín	Fonseca	Nomination
2018	GRAMMY	Best Latin Pop Album	Prometo	Pablo Alborán	Nomination
2018	Latin GRAMMY	Album of the Year / Best Traditional Pop Vocal Album	Prometo	Pablo Alborán	Nomination
2012	GRAMMY	Album of the Year / Best Pop Vocal Album	Born This Way	Lady Gaga	Nomination
