= Absolutely Everybody =

1999 single by Vanessa Amorosi

Single by Vanessa Amorosi

from the album The Power
- Released: 15 November 1999
- Length: 3:42
- Label: Transistor
- Songwriters: Mark Holden; James Roy Ingram; Anthony John Hicks
- Producer: Axel Breitung

Vanessa Amorosi singles chronology
"Have a Look" (1999)	"Absolutely Everybody" (1999)	"Shine" (2000)

Music videos
- "Absolutely Everybody" (Millennium version) on YouTube
- "Absolutely Everybody" (Club version) on YouTube

"Absolutely Everybody" is a song by Australian singer-songwriter Vanessa Amorosi, released as the second single from her debut album, The Power (2000), on 15 November 1999 by Transistor Music Australia. The song reached number six in Australia and number 10 in New Zealand, and when released in Europe the following year, it peaked at number seven in the United Kingdom, number one in Hungary, and the top 10 in five other countries.

== Song information ==
"Absolutely Everybody" debuted and peaked at number six on the Australia ARIA Single Charts, her fourth-highest-charting single to date. It was the 74th-best-selling single of 1999 and the 40th-best-selling single for 2000 in that country. It remained in the ARIA Singles Chart for over six months after its release. In New Zealand, the single peaked at number 10 on 14 May 2000 and spent 27 weeks in the top 50. Shortly after her performances at the 2000 Summer Olympics in Sydney, the song was released internationally and reached the top 10 in the United Kingdom and throughout Europe. The song's highest peak was in Hungary, where it reached number one.

For her service to music, Amorosi was later awarded the Australian Centenary Medal by the Government of Australia. "Absolutely Everybody", with its positive lyrics, became an unofficial theme song for various cultural events. The song had four different music videos. The first was released in Australia in 1999, followed by the Australian Millennium version; the other two videos were made for the British and German markets, respectively, in 2000.

== Track listings ==
Australian and Japanese CD single

1. "Absolutely Everybody" (radio version) – 3:42
2. "Absolutely Everybody" (Latino version) – 3:27
3. "Absolutely Everybody" (extended version) – 5:16
4. "Absolutely Everybody" (Latino extended) – 5:22

UK CD single

1. "Absolutely Everybody" (radio version)
2. "Absolutely Everybody" (Latino version)
3. "Absolutely Everybody" (Almighty Mix)
4. "Absolutely Everybody" (video)

UK cassette single

1. "Absolutely Everybody" (radio version)
2. "Absolutely Everybody" (Almighty Mix)

European CD single

1. "Absolutely Everybody" (radio edit) – 3:42
2. "Absolutely Everybody" (Latino version) – 3:27

== Charts ==
=== Weekly charts ===
Chart (1999–2001)	Peak position
Australia (ARIA)	6
Austria (Ö3 Austria Top 40)	3
Belgium (Ultratop 50 Flanders)	10
Belgium (Ultratip Bubbling Under Wallonia)	6
Europe (Eurochart Hot 100)	17
Germany (GfK)	5
Hungary (Mahasz)	1
Ireland (IRMA)	2
New Zealand (Recorded Music NZ)	10
Poland Airplay (Music & Media)	14
Scottish Singles Sales (Official Charts)	5
Sweden (Sverigetopplistan)	42
Switzerland (Schweizer Hitparade)	8
UK Singles (Official Charts)	7

Chart (2025)	Peak position
Poland (Polish Airplay Top 100)	67

=== Year-end charts ===
Chart (1999)	Position
Australia (ARIA)	74

Chart (2000)	Position
Australia (ARIA)	40
Germany (Media Control)	53
Ireland (IRMA)	26
New Zealand (RIANZ)	12
Switzerland (Schweizer Hitparade)	71
UK Singles (OCC)	139

Chart (2001)	Position
Austria (Ö3 Austria Top 40)	46
Belgium (Ultratop 50 Flanders)	68

== Certifications ==
Region	Certification	Certified units/sales
Australia (ARIA)	Platinum	70,000^{^}
Germany (BVMI)	Gold	250,000^{^}
New Zealand (RMNZ)	Gold	15,000^{‡}
United Kingdom	—	113,000
^{^} Shipments figures based on certification alone.^{‡} Sales+streaming figures based on certification alone.

== Release history ==
Region	Date	Format(s)	Label(s)	Ref.
Australia	15 November 1999	CD	Transistor Music	
United Kingdom	11 September 2000	CD; cassette	Universal	
Japan	20 September 2000	CD	Universal	
United States	9 April 2001	Hot adult contemporary radio	Universal	
United States	10 April 2001	Contemporary hit; rhythmic contemporary radio	Universal	
