= Vanessa Amorosi =

Australian singer-songwriter and recording artist (born 1981)

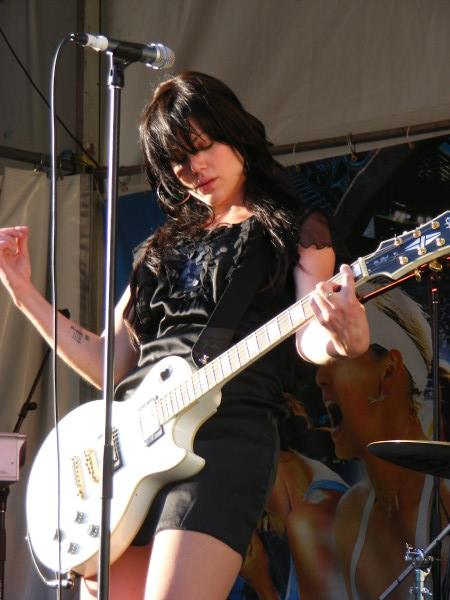
- Amorosi performing live in 2008

Background information
- Born: Vanessa Joy Amorosi; 8 August 1981 (age 45); Melbourne, Victoria, Australia
- Genres: Rock; pop; acoustic; soul; gospel
- Occupations: Singer-songwriter, recording artist
- Years active: 1998–present
- Labels: Sony BMG; Universal; Angel Works
- Spouse: Rod Busby (m. 2017)
- Children: 1
- Website: vanessaamorosi.com

Vanessa Joy Amorosi (born 8 August 1981) is an Australian singer-songwriter and recording artist. She has sold at least two million units in albums or singles worldwide.

Amorosi rose to fame in 1999 when her debut single, "Have a Look", reached gold status in Australia. The following year, she achieved international success with her debut studio album, The Power. She performed at both the 2000 Olympic Games opening ceremony and its accompanying closing ceremony in Sydney. Her performance of "Heroes Live Forever" at the opening ceremony gained international acclaim. Performed at the closing ceremony, "Absolutely Everybody", which became the anthem of the games, went on to be a major hit in Australia and many European countries including the United Kingdom and Germany. After releasing her second studio album, Change, in 2002 and taking a break from the spotlight, Amorosi returned in 2008 with the release of her third studio album Somewhere in the Real World. The album's most successful single, "Perfect", marked her comeback to the ARIA top 5 singles and was the most played Australian song on Australian radio for 2008. Her fourth studio album, Hazardous, followed in 2009 and is Amorosi's second-best selling album in Australia behind her debut, The Power. It produced her first number one-charting single, "This Is Who I Am".

She subsequently released three more albums: Back to Love (2019), Blacklisted Collection (2020) and City of Angels (2022).

To date, Amorosi has received a total of 16 ARIA and APRA nominations. She has won an APRA award with "Shine", a VIVA Comet Award for "Best International Newcomer" and an ARIA No.1 Chart Award with "This Is Who I Am".

== Early life ==
Amorosi was born in Melbourne, in a Roman Catholic family of partial Italian origin, the daughter of singers Frank and Joy Amorosi. When she was four, she and her younger sisters, Mellissa and Natasha, went to rap, jazz and classical ballet classes run by her uncle. She attended Emerald Primary School and Emerald Secondary College. At the age of 12, Amorosi started to perform in shopping centres and local council concerts under the supervision of her family. She also performed on Young Talent Time. Amorosi was discovered performing at Matrioshka, a Russian restaurant in Carnegie, by Jack Strom (after being referred by Leigh Hope) and signed a recording contract in 1997. After being signed to MarJac Productions (co-owned by managers Mark Holden and Jack Strom) and recording a promo CD titled "Get Here", she secured a deal with Transistor Music Australia.

== Career ==
=== 1999–2002: The Power ===
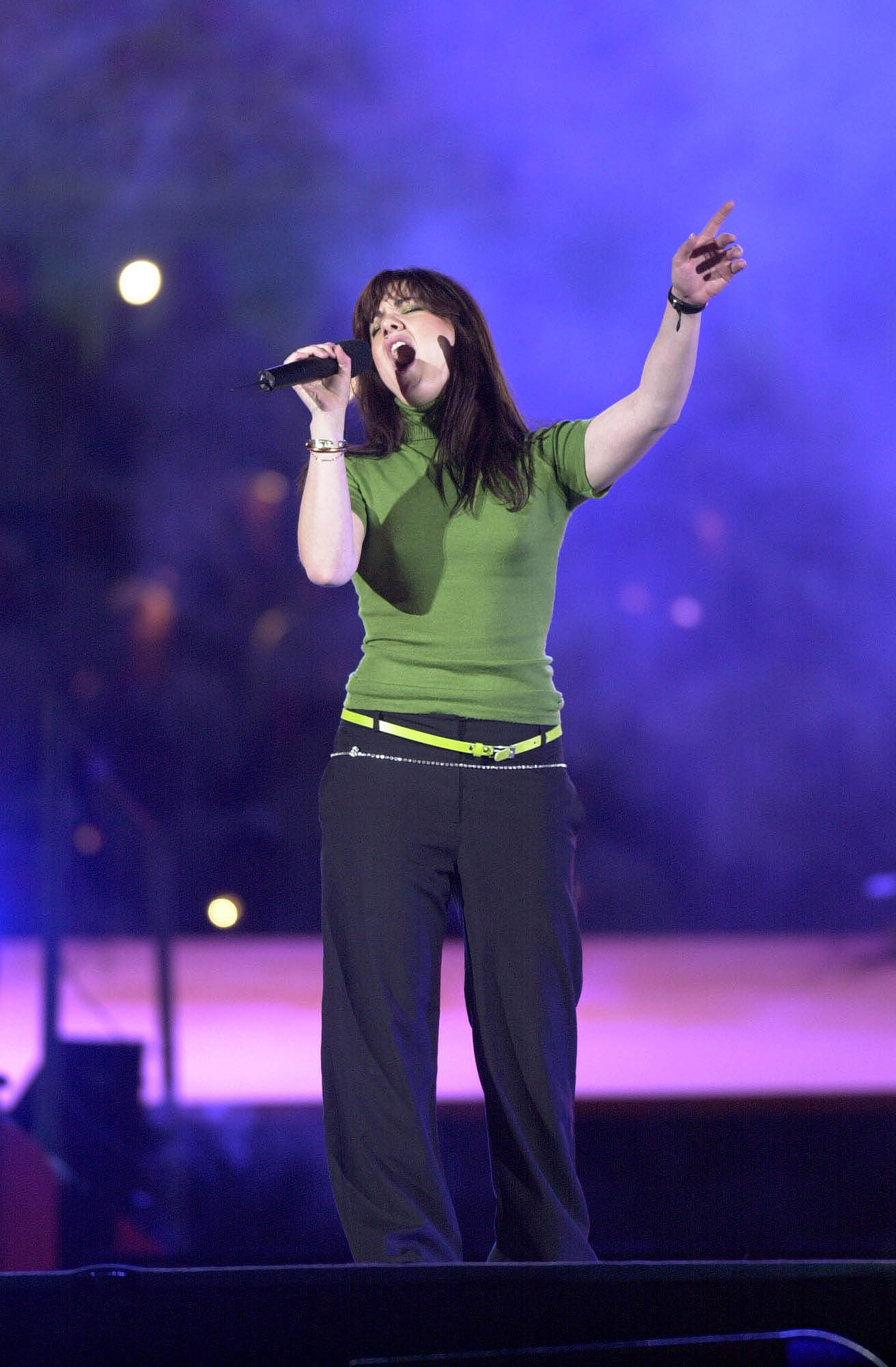
Amorosi shown singing at the opening ceremony of the 2000 Summer Paralympics in Sydney, Australia

In 1999, Amorosi released her debut single "Have a Look" which became a Top 20 hit and went gold in Australia. At the end of this year she performed at Carols in the Domain. "Have a Look" was followed by her second single "Absolutely Everybody", an anthemic dance song, which reached the Top 10. It was certified double platinum and became the longest charting Australian single by an Australian female artist. It remained in the ARIA Top 50 Singles Chart for over six months after its release. "Absolutely Everybody" was released internationally and reached the Top 10 in many European countries including the UK and Germany where it received a gold certification. Amorosi performed at many large events such as the NRL Grand Final, the opening of the Motorcycle Grand Prix at Phillip Island and the new millennium on New Year's Eve at Darling Harbour.

Following the success of the first two singles, Amorosi released two more singles in 2000. "Shine" and the double A-sided single "The Power"/"Every Time I Close My Eyes" became major Australian hits. Both were accredited gold by the ARIA Australian music industry. The rights to create a remixed version of "Shine" were purchased by the airline Ansett Australia, who used this version for a commercial. Amorosi was one of many celebrities to appear in the commercial. In Europe, "Every Time I Close My Eyes" was released as the fourth single from The Power and became her most successful song in Germany behind "Absolutely Everybody".

From 29 April to 25 May, Amorosi supported Savage Garden for 16 shows on the Australian leg of their Affirmation World Tour.

Her album The Power reached number one on the Australian album charts. Amorosi received six ARIA nominations in the year 2000 awards and The Power was nominated for "Best Female Artist" and "Best Pop Release" in the ARIA Music Awards of 2001. Her largest audience came in September 2000 with performances at the opening and closing ceremonies of the 2000 Sydney Olympics and at the Paralympic Games. At the opening ceremony of the aforementioned Olympics she sang the Olympic song titled "Heroes Live Forever". Amorosi won the APRA Award in 2001 for "Most Played Song" on Australian Radio with "Shine", and received international acclaim in Germany where she won "Best International Newcomer" at the 2001 VIVA Comet Awards. Later that year she also made a special appearance at the Goodwill Games opening and closing ceremonies in Brisbane. In 2001, she performed at the AFL Grand Final.

In October 2001, Amorosi released Turn to Me, a compilation album with new songs and tracks from The Power, which were previously unreleased in Australia. It also contains the studio version of the Olympic song "Heroes Live Forever". Turn to Me was released in Australia only and achieved a top 30 peak. The same titled lead single from the album reached number 80 on the ARIA singles chart.

In August 2002, Amorosi traveled to Manchester where she was one of the stars of the Commonwealth Games Hand-Over Ceremony, performing her single "Shine" and a new song written especially for the event, "I'll Always Be a Melbourne Girl".

=== 2002–2003: Change ===
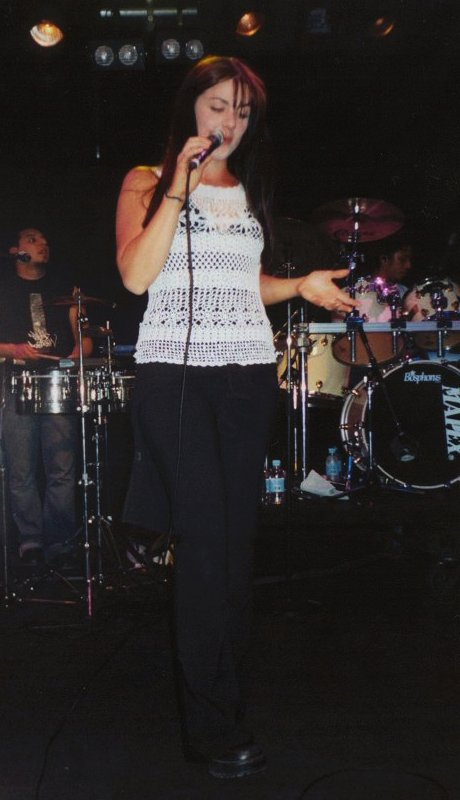
Amorosi performing in 2002

On 18 November 2002, Amorosi released her second studio album Change. It was released in Germany only and contains the previous released singles "One Thing Leads 2 Another", which debuted at No. 67 on the German Singles Chart and the Australian exclusive single-release "Spin (Everybody's Doin' It)", which became a top 50 hit on the ARIA Charts. The album peaked at number 64 on the German Top 100.

In February 2003, Amorosi performed her blues set for the first time at the Melbourne International Music and Blues Festival and traveled to Germany to perform her third single "True To Yourself" from the album Change on Top of the Pops and the long-running show Wetten, dass..? which screens throughout Europe. The single was released on 24 February 2003 and peaked at number 99 on the German Singles Chart.

Change was set to be released in Australia later in 2003, but it remains unreleased there for unknown reasons.

=== 2003–2009: Somewhere in the Real World ===
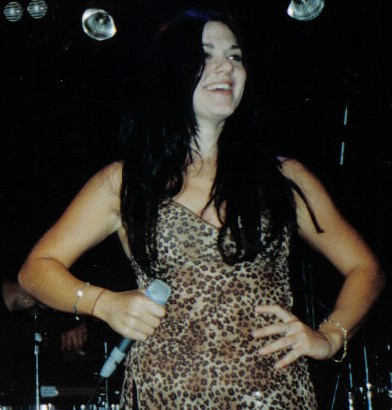
Amorosi in 2004

On 25 January 2006, it was revealed that Amorosi signed with manager Ralph Carr, having completed her seven-year management with MarJac Productions. She is quoted on the website as saying, "I have been with my previous management for seven years and thought both parties had gone as far as we could together... Moving over to Ralph Carr Management seemed like a natural progression, given the acts he has successfully managed. I am excited and enthused." On 22 November, it was announced that Amorosi had signed to Universal Music Australia.

Amorosi's involvement with Kids Help Line and the Variety Club led to a number of honours, including a 2003 nomination for Australian of the Year. She still has the farm where endangered animals can find refuge, although she does not get to visit much; her friends run it for her. She supported Kiss on their 2008 tour of Australia.

In 2008, Amorosi released the album Somewhere in the Real World, through Universal Music Australia, on 24 May 2008. The album tracks "Perfect" and "Start It" have both been used in promotions for the Seven Network. "Start It" is Channel 7's AFL song for 2008 and was used again in 2009. Released digitally and in stores on 24 May 2008, Somewhere in the Real World reached gold sales in Australia.

The single "Kiss Your Mama!" was serviced to radio on 3 August and released 8 September 2007.

On a special edition of Australian Idol she sang her hit song "Kiss Your Mama!". This marked Amorosi's returned to the ARIA charts the first single in many years to be released, the song peaked at No. 15.

Amorosi released her second single, "Perfect", digitally on 5 April and physically on 26 April 2008. The single made it to number 1 on the digital iTunes charts on 7 June 2008, and a then equal highest charting singles of her career at No. 4. "Perfect" reached Platinum sales in Australia and was the most played Australian song on Australian radio for 2008. "Perfect" was nominated for the 2009 APRA awards for 'Most Played Australian Work'.

Following the success of her first two singles a third single was released from the album, the song "The Simple Things (Something Emotional)" was released on 20 September 2008. The Song received a video and achieved a top 40 peak. In December 2008 a video for the song "My House" was released onto her website, but never released as a single.

On 20 April 2009, an Amorosi fan website revealed details of a collaboration with US band Hoobastank on a single titled "The Letter". The website also provided the duet to be streamed in full. Amorosi also appears in the video which was shot in Los Angeles at Lacy Street Studio with director Paul Brown (Alicia Keys, Jack White). The video and single was serviced to Australian media on 4 May. The single was released in Australia on 19 June 2009.

=== 2009–2010: Hazardous ===
Amorosi's album Hazardous became her third ARIA Top 10 album. Debuting at No. 7, it was also the week's highest album debut by an Australian artist and has been accredited platinum by the Australian Recording Industry Association. The album has produced the singles "This Is Who I Am" (Amorosi's first No. 1), top 30 hit "Hazardous" and third single "Mr. Mysterious" featuring Seany B. Amorosi released the album to the German market in early June 2010.

On 28 August 2009, Amorosi's new song "This Is Who I Am" was serviced to Australian radio. On 31 August 2009, Universal Music Australia released a press release for Amorosi's new single with details of new single and album.

The first single to spawn from her forthcoming album is the fierce pop-rock song "This Is Who I Am". The undoubtable hit single was produced by MachoPsycho (Pink) and mixed by Chris Lord-Alge (Green Day) and was serviced to Australian radio this week. The video for "This Is Who I Am" was recently shot in Los Angeles and directed by Christopher R Watson. The video was predominately shot on green screen and will launch on 14 September.

"This Is Who I Am" debuted at number 1 on the ARIA Charts for the week beginning 18 October 2009. This is Amorosi's first number 1 single. The single held the top spot for a second week in a row – becoming the first Australian artist to debut at No. 1 and hold No. 1 single since Silverchair's "Straight Lines" in 2007. "This Is Who I Am" has achieved 2× platinum sales in Australia making it her most successful single to date in her homeland.

With the success of her album and first single "This Is Who I Am", Amorosi released her second single and title track from the album Hazardous. Amorosi flew to Los Angeles to film the video for "Hazardous" with director Paul Brown (Prince, Alicia Keys), which was serviced Thursday, 17 December 2009. The single peaked at No. 29 on the ARIA Charts – a solid follow-up single to her first number 1.

It was announced that Amorosi would collaborate with Mary J. Blige, so Amorosi flew to Los Angeles on 1 February to film the music video for her duet with Mary J. Blige for the upcoming single "Each Tear". The new version of the track will feature on an international re-release of Blige's latest record Stronger with Each Tear.

On 4 March 2010, Amorosi announced "Mr. Mysterious" as the third single from the Hazardous album via newsletter. During March 2010 Vanessa Amorosi supported Rob Thomas on his Australian leg of the Cradlesong Tour, as well as performing headline shows for her fans separately.

"Holiday" was released as the fourth single off Hazardous and charted in the top 50 on the ARIA charts. The song is one of her favourite tracks on the album: "Holiday is inspired by a fantasy of escaping to a far off island, warm weather, with sand at my feet, partying all night and dancing till dawn", Amorosi explains.

=== 2010–2012: V and its delays ===
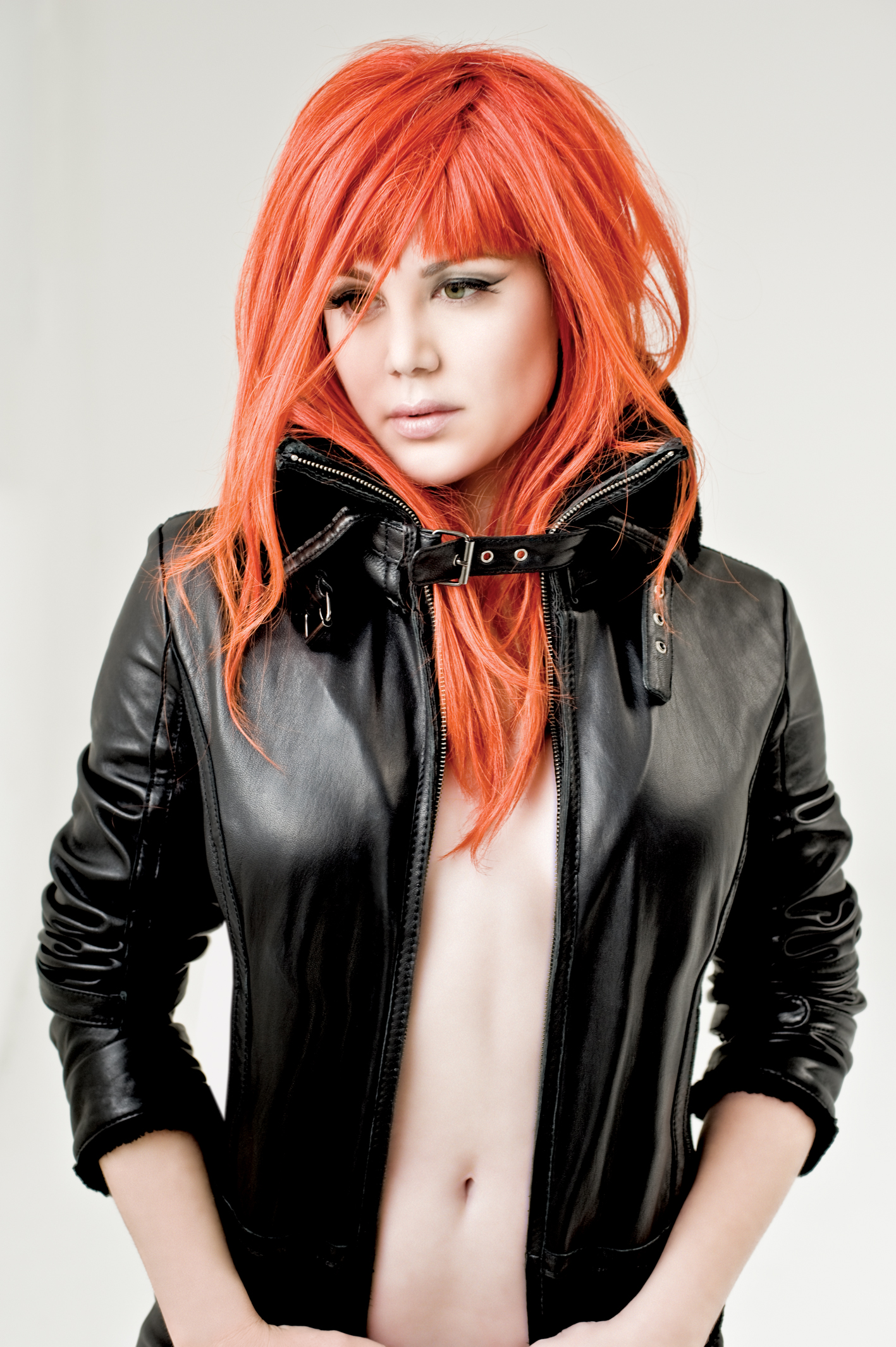
Amorosi in 2011

In September 2010, Amorosi revealed on her official Twitter account she was back in the studio again with MachoPsycho in London. In October 2010, she wrote to her mailing list announcing she was writing and recording in Los Angeles for her new studio album, which is described to "push boundaries" and "may even shock people".

Amorosi's first single "Gossip" from her forthcoming album V was released on 1 July 2011 and became the No. 1 added song on Australian radio in the first week, but did not chart in the ARIA Top 100 Singles. The second single "Amazing" was released 9 September 2011 and peaked at No. 83 on the ARIA Singles Chart. The song was featured on Channel 7's AFL Grand Final ad which also resulted in Vanessa Amorosi performing at the AFL Grand Final in 2011. 2011 also saw Amorosi work on such campaigns as Proactiv, Headspace and Kids Helpline.

The tracklist and previews were already available in the Australian iTunes store, but on 3 November 2011, Amorosi announced her album due for release on 11 November would be delayed until further notice. In August 2012, Amorosi announced she was no longer with Universal Music, and would be looking to rebuild her career as an album artist. The album is still unreleased to this day.

=== 2012–2018: Dave Stewart projects ===
In 2012, Amorosi began played several shows with former Eurythmics frontman Dave Stewart. After Amorosi's performance on the "Dave Stewart & Friends" show at the Troubadour in 2012, both became friends and later they talked about her love for gospel music and gospel arranging, as Stewart said in an interview with Noise11.com. She also appeared as a featured vocalist on Stewart's 2013 album Lucky Numbers.

In a June 2014 interview with APN, Amorosi said she was working on a gospel album and her fifth studio album, which she revealed would be "completely different" to her previous releases.

In August 2014, Amorosi was one of the stars of the Dave Stewart organized tribute event "The Beatles' 50th Anniversary at the Hollywood Bowl", performing the songs "Roll Over Beethoven", "Twist and Shout", "Get Back", and "Let It Be". Stewart announced on his website in April 2015, that he was writing new material with Vanessa Amorosi.

In 2017, Amorosi was featured on a duet with Australian singer-songwriter Jon Stevens entitled "Something 'Bout You", from his album Starlight, co-written and produced by Dave Stewart. Stevens was introduced to Stewart by Amorosi. She was also featured in the song "Delicious" with Canadian singer-songwriter Daniel Powter.

Amorosi recorded her new album in October 2016, at Royal Studios in Memphis, with Dave Stewart serving as the producer. She was in Los Angeles on 11 March 2017 for a photo shoot for the album, and has returned to Hollywood for post-production of the album. On 13 April 2018, it was announced by director Jesse Davey that post-production had begun on Amorosi's music video titled "Wolf". This album would not be finished and released until 2023.

=== 2019: Back to Love ===
In January 2019, a list of artists that contributed to Vanessa's upcoming Back to Love album were announced. These artists include Aleena Gibson, Trevor Muzzy, Louis Schoorl, Jordan Palmer, Sarah Solovay, David Gamson, and Jon Levine.

In April 2019, Amorosi released "Heavy Lies the Head" as the lead single from her upcoming fifth studio album. Its release confirmed she was still signed to Universal Music Australia under a distribution deal, with a new independent label Angel Works involved as well.

In August 2019, Amorosi announced the single "Hello Me", which was released on 6 September. The name of her fifth studio album Back to Love was also announced, which was released on 8 November 2019.

In November 2019, it was announced that Amorosi would be competing in Eurovision - Australia Decides in hopes of representing Australia in the Eurovision Song Contest 2020. Her song "Lessons of Love" finished 3rd.

=== 2020–2021: The Blacklisted Collection ===
On 30 March 2020, Amorosi released "Coming Down Off You", the first of a series of new songs, released weekly, every Monday, leading to release of The Blacklisted Collection on 26 June 2020.

On 26 March 2021, Amorosi released the EP Vol. 1, featuring six tracks of soul and gospel music. A second EP was released in June 2021.

=== 2022: City of Angels and Sydney Gay and Lesbian Mardi Gras ===
On 4 February 2022, Amorosi announced the released City of Angels, scheduled for release on 18 March 2022.

On 5 March 2022, Amorosi performed "Absolutely Everybody" at the Sydney Gay and Lesbian Mardi Gras as part of American Express's float.

On 5 August 2022, Amorosi released "Good Times Are Coming", a stand-alone single to coincide with her performance of "Amazing" at the 2022 Commonwealth Games Closing Ceremony.

=== 2022–present: Memphis Love ===
In December 2022, Amorosi was seen recording with Dave Stewart at Bay Street Records in Nassau, Bahamas. In January 2023, she again confirmed that she will be releasing her upcoming record through Bay Street Records.

On 1 September 2023, Amorosi released "Wolf", the lead single from her eighth studio album, Memphis Love, scheduled for release in November 2023.

== Personal life ==
Following the release of Hazardous in 2009, Amorosi relocated to Los Angeles, California, where she lives. In October 2017, she married martial arts trainer Rod Busby in The Two Pines Chapel (Lancaster, California), which was used in the film Kill Bill. The couple have a son, Killian, born in 2016. In August 2024, she won a court battle against her mother, who she sued to seize control of property she claimed was rightfully hers.

== Discography ==
Studio albums

- The Power (2000)
- Change (2002)
- Somewhere in the Real World (2008)
- Hazardous (2009)
- Back to Love (2019)
- The Blacklisted Collection (2020)
- City of Angels (2022)
- Memphis Love (2023)

== Awards and nominations ==
=== APRA Awards ===
The APRA Awards have been presented annually from 1982 by the Australasian Performing Right Association (APRA), "honouring composers and songwriters".

Year	Nominee / work	Award	Result
2001	Most Performed Australian Work	"Shine"	Won
2001	Song of the Year	"Shine"	Nominated
2009	Most Played Australian Work	"Perfect"	Nominated

=== ARIA Awards ===
The ARIA Music Awards, hosted by the Australian Recording Industry Association (ARIA), recognise "excellence and innovation across all genres" of music in Australia.

Year	Nominee / work	Award	Result
2000	Highest Selling Single	"Absolutely Everybody"	Nominated
2000	Best Female Artist	"Absolutely Everybody"	Nominated
2000	Best Pop Release	"Absolutely Everybody"	Nominated
2000	Breakthrough Artist - Single	"Have a Look"	Nominated
2000	Highest Selling Album	The Power	Nominated
2000	Breakthrough Artist - Album	The Power	Nominated
2001	Best Female Artist	The Power	Nominated
2001	Best Pop Release	The Power	Nominated
2010	Most Popular Australian Artist	herself	Nominated
2010	Most Popular Australian Album	Hazardous	Nominated
2010	Most Popular Australian Single	"This Is Who I Am"	Nominated
2010	Most Popular Australian Single	"Mr. Mysterious"	Nominated
2022	Best Soul/R&B Release	City of Angels	Nominated

=== Australian Women in Music Awards ===
The Australian Women in Music Awards is an annual event that celebrates outstanding women in the Australian Music Industry who have made significant and lasting contributions in their chosen field. They commenced in 2018.

Year	Nominee / work	Award	Result	Ref.
2023	Vanessa Amorosi	Inspiration Award	Won	

=== Nickelodeon Australian Kids' Choice Awards ===
Year	Nominee / work	Award	Result
2010	Fave Aussie Musos	Herself	Nominated

=== VIVA Comet Awards ===
Year	Nominee / work	Award	Result
2001	Best International Newcomer	Herself	Won
