= List of top 25 singles for 1999 in Australia =

Top 25 singles of 1999 < 1998 2000 >

Other Australian top charts for 1999
- top 25 albums
- Triple J Hottest 100

Australian number-one charts of 1999
- albums
- singles

The following lists the top 100 singles of 1999 in Australia from the Australian Recording Industry Association (ARIA) End of Year singles chart.

"Mambo No. 5" by Lou Bega was the biggest song of the year, peaking at #1 for eight weeks and staying in the top 50 for 17 weeks. The longest stay at #1 was by Britney Spears with "...Baby One More Time" which spent 9 weeks at the top spot.

#	Title	Artist	Highest pos. reached	Weeks at No. 1
1.	"Mambo No. 5"	Lou Bega	1	8 (Note: "Mambo No. 5" entered the charts at No. 7 on 12 September 1999 and reached No. 1 on 19 September 1999, where it remained for eight weeks. The song stayed in the charts for 17 weeks.)
2.	"...Baby One More Time"	Britney Spears	1	9 (Note: "...Baby One More Time" entered the charts at No. 20 on 31 January 1999 and reached No. 1 on 28th February 1999, where it remained for nine weeks. The song stayed in the charts for 23 weeks.)
3.	"Blue (Da Ba Dee)"	Eiffel 65	1	9 (Note: "Blue (Da Ba Dee)" spent seven weeks at the top spot in 1999 and two weeks in 2000. The song stayed in the charts for a total of 24 weeks.)
4.	"Last Kiss"	Pearl Jam	1	7
5.	"Pretty Fly (For a White Guy)"	The Offspring	1	6 (Note: "Pretty Fly (For a White Guy)" reached No. 1 in December, 1998 and remained in that spot for six weeks until January, 1999. The song stayed in the charts for 22 weeks.)
6.	"Believe"	Cher	1	5
7.	"Don't Call Me Baby"	Madison Avenue	2	
8.	"That Don't Impress Me Much"	Shania Twain	2	
9.	"Why Don't You Get a Job"	The Offspring	2	
10.	"Genie in a Bottle"	Christina Aguilera	2	
11.	"Smooth"	Santana ft. Rob Thomas	4	
12.	"No Scrubs"	TLC	1	7
13.	"If Ya Gettin' Down"	Five	2	
14.	"Bring It All Back"	S Club 7	3	
15.	"When You Say Nothing at All"	Ronan Keating	3	
16.	"If You Had My Love"	Jennifer Lopez	1	3
17.	"We Like to Party"	The Vengaboys	2	
18.	"The Animal Song"	Savage Garden	3	
19.	"Kiss Me"	Sixpence None the Richer	1	3
20.	"2 Times"	Ann Lee	4	
21.	"Livin' La Vida Loca"	Ricky Martin	4	
22.	"Sometimes"	Britney Spears	2	
23.	"The Millennium Prayer"	Cliff Richard	2	
24.	"Boom Boom Boom Boom"	The Vengaboys	2	
25.	"I Want It That Way"	Backstreet Boys	2	
26.	"Larger than Life"	Backstreet Boys	3	
27.	"I Knew I Loved You"	Savage Garden	4	
28.	"Sister"	Sister2Sister	3	
29.	"Anthem for the Year 2000"	Silverchair	3	
30.	"Touch It"	Monifah	5	
31.	"All Star"	Smash Mouth	4	
32.	"Waiting for Tonight"	Jennifer Lopez	4	
33.	"Jackie"	B.Z. feat. Joanne	3	
34.	"Beautiful Stranger"	Madonna	5	
35.	"Silence"	Delerium	6	
36.	"Weir"	Killing Heidi	6	
37.	"Unpretty"	TLC	3	
38.	"9 PM (Till I Come)"	ATB	10	
39.	"This Kiss"	Faith Hill	4	
40.	"Thank ABBA for the Music"	Steps, Tina Cousins, Cleopatra, B*Witched and Billie	9	
41.	"(You Drive Me) Crazy"	Britney Spears	12	
42.	"Lullaby"	Shawn Mullins	5	
43.	"Shimmer"	Fuel	16	
44.	"Man! I Feel Like a Woman!"	Shania Twain	4	
45.	"Goodbye"	Spice Girls	3	
46.	"Sweet like Chocolate"	Shanks & Bigfoot	6	
47.	"Have You Ever?"	Brandy	8	
48.	"Honey to the Bee"	Billie	6	
49.	"Wild Wild West"	Will Smith	8	
50.	"Heartbreaker"	Mariah Carey	10	
51.	"Look at Me"	Geri Halliwell	3	
52.	"Fly Away"	Lenny Kravitz	8	
53.	"No Matter What"	Boyzone	5	
54.	"She's So High"	Tal Bachman	8	
55.	"Bailamos"	Enrique Iglesias	13	
56.	"Zorba's Dance"	LCD	13	
57.	"Angel of Mine"	Monica	12	
58.	"Eternal Flame"	Human Nature	8	
59.	"Baby Did a Bad Bad Thing"	Chris Isaak	9	
60.	"Say It Once"	Ultra	4	
61.	"How Do I Deal"	Jennifer Love Hewitt	8	
62.	"Every Morning"	Sugar Ray	17	
63.	"Forever"	Tina Cousins	14	
64.	"Have a Look"	Vanessa Amorosi	13	
65.	"Strong Enough"	Cher	11	
66.	"Freak on a Leash"	Korn	22	
67.	"Can't Take My Eyes Off You"	Lauryn Hill	8	
68.	"Everywhere You Go"	Taxiride	15	
69.	"Scar Tissue"	Red Hot Chili Peppers	15	
70.	"Got the Feelin'"	Five	6	
71.	"American Woman"	Lenny Kravitz	14	
72.	"Keep on Movin'"	Five	6	
73.	"You Get What You Give"	New Radicals	13	
74.	"Absolutely Everybody"	Vanessa Amorosi	6	
75.	"I Want You Back"	NSYNC	11	
76.	"Westside"	TQ	10	
77.	"How Deep Is Your Love"	Dru Hill	13	
78.	"My Name Is"	Eminem	13	
79.	"Swear It Again"	Westlife	12	
80.	"You Don't Know Me"	Armand Van Helden feat. Duane Harden	15	
81.	"Don't Cry"	Human Nature	5	
82.	"Burning Down the House"	Tom Jones and The Cardigans	8	
83.	"When You're Gone"	Bryan Adams feat. Melanie C	4	
84.	"A Little Bit"	Pandora	10	
85.	"Ana's Song (Open Fire)"	Silverchair	14	
86.	"Last to Know"	Human Nature	14	
87.	"She's All I Ever Had"	Ricky Martin	28	
88.	"That's the Way It Is"	Celine Dion	14	
89.	"Shake Your Bon-Bon"	Ricky Martin	27	
90.	"Got the Life"	Korn	26	
91.	"You've Got a Way"	Shania Twain	28	
92.	"Heartbeat/Tragedy"	Steps	10	
93.	"All Torn Down"	The Living End	12	
94.	"Heartbreak Hotel"	Whitney Houston feat. Faith Evans and Kelly Price	17	
95.	"If I Let You Go"	Westlife	13	
96.	"The Hardest Thing"	98 Degrees	24	
97.	"Get Set"	Taxiride	8	
98.	"When I Grow Up"	Garbage	22	
99.	"The Bad Touch"	Bloodhound Gang	5	
100.	"Tearin' Up My Heart"	NSYNC	20	
