= List of top 25 albums for 1995 in Australia =

Top 25 albums of 1995 < 1994 1996 >

Other Australian top charts for 1995
- top 25 singles
- Triple J Hottest 100

Australian number-one charts of 1995
- albums
- singles

These are the top 50 albums of 1995 in Australia from the Australian Recording Industry Association (ARIA) End of Year Albums Chart.

#	Title	Artist	Highest pos. reached	Weeks at No. 1
1.	Don't Ask	Tina Arena	1	1
2.	The Colour of My Love	Celine Dion	1	4
3.	No Need to Argue	The Cranberries	1	1
4.	HIStory: Past, Present and Future, Book I	Michael Jackson	1	3
5.	Forrest Gump	Soundtrack	1	3
6.	Design of a Decade: 1986–1996	Janet Jackson	2	
7.	Frogstomp	Silverchair	1	3
8.	Throwing Copper	Live	1	7
9.	Daydream	Mariah Carey	1	1
10.	Dookie	Green Day	1	3
11.	Smash	The Offspring	1	3
12.	Pulp Fiction	Soundtrack	4	
13.	MTV Unplugged in New York	Nirvana	1	3
14.	Tuesday Night Music Club	Sheryl Crow	1	2
15.	Painted Desert Serenade	Joshua Kadison	2	
16.	Forever Blue	Chris Isaak	2	
17.	The Memory of Trees	Enya	1	2
18.	Beatles Anthology	The Beatles	1	2
19.	Something to Remember	Madonna	1	1
20.	Greatest Hits (1985-1995)	Michael Bolton	6	
21.	Bizarre Fruit II	M People	14	
22.	These Days	Bon Jovi	1	2
23.	Cracked Rear View	Hootie & the Blowfish	7	
24.	Permanent Shade of Blue	Roachford	2	
25.	One Hot Minute	Red Hot Chili Peppers	1	2
26.	Cross Road	Bon Jovi	1	2
27.	The Garden	Merril Bainbridge	5	
28.	The Celts	Enya	7	
29.	Greatest Hits	Bruce Springsteen	1	1
30.	Dangerous Minds	Soundtrack	1	2
31.	Vitalogy	Pearl Jam	1	1
32.	The Lion King	Soundtrack	3	
33.	Love Songs	Elton John	7	
34.	Another Night	Real McCoy	6	
35.	Nevermind	Nirvana	2	
36.	The Hits	Garth Brooks	2	
37.	II	Boyz II Men	4	
38.	Merry Christmas	Mariah Carey	2	
39.	Hell Freezes Over	Eagles	23	
40.	Three Legged Dog	The Cruel Sea	1	2
41.	Batman Forever	Soundtrack	6	
42.	Made in Heaven	Queen	3	
43.	She	Harry Connick Jr.	3	
44.	All You Can Eat	k.d. lang	3	
45.	Gold: Greatest Hits	ABBA	1	2
46.	The Very Best of Cat Stevens	Cat Stevens	6	
47.	Ballbreaker	AC/DC	1	1
48.	Priscilla, Queen of the Desert	Soundtrack	1	4
49.	Ten	Pearl Jam	11	
50.	Everybody Else Is Doing It, So Why Can't We?	The Cranberries	16	

Peak chart positions from 1995 are from the ARIA Charts, overall position on the End of Year Chart is calculated by ARIA based on the number of weeks and position that the records reach within the Top 50 albums for each week during 1995.
