= List of top 25 singles for 1998 in Australia =

Top 25 singles of 1998 < 1997 1999 >

Other Australian top charts for 1998
- top 25 albums
- Triple J Hottest 100

Australian number-one charts of 1998
- albums
- singles

The following list ranks the top 100 singles of 1998 in Australia from the Australian Recording Industry Association (ARIA) End of Year singles chart.

"The Cup of Life/María" by Ricky Martin was the biggest song of the year, peaking at #1 for six weeks and staying in the top 50 for 27 weeks. The longest stay at #1 was by Aerosmith with "I Don't Want to Miss a Thing" which spent nine weeks at the top spot.

#	Title	Artist	Highest pos. reached	Weeks at No. 1
1.	"La Copa De La Vida (The Cup of Life) / Un, Dos, Tres (María)"	Ricky Martin	1	6 (Note: "Cup of Life" took fifteen weeks before it reached No. 1 in June, 1998 where it remained in that position for six consecutive weeks before dropping out of the charts six weeks later.)
2.	"It's Like That"	Run DMC vs. Jason Nevins	1	1 (Note: "It's Like That" first entered the charts in November, 1997 and didn't reach #1 until March, 1998. The song stayed in the charts for 37 weeks.)
3.	"Iris"	Goo Goo Dolls	1	5
4.	"I Don't Want to Miss a Thing"	Aerosmith	1	9 (Note: "I Don't Want to Miss a Thing" entered the charts in August, 1998 and reached No. 1 five weeks later where it remained for an unbroken nine weeks. The song stayed in the charts for 30 weeks.)
5.	"Never Ever"	All Saints	1	7
6.	"Second Solution / Prisoner of Society"	The Living End	4	
7.	"Crush"	Jennifer Paige	1	2
8.	"Good Riddance (Time of Your Life) / Redundant"	Green Day	2	
9.	"You're Still the One"	Shania Twain	1	4
10.	"From This Moment On"	Shania Twain	2	
11.	"High"	Lighthouse Family	1	1
12.	"All My Life"	K-Ci & JoJo	1	1
13.	"Ghetto Supastar (That Is What You Are)"	Pras feat. Mýa	2	
14.	"My Heart Will Go On"	Celine Dion	1	4
15.	"5, 6, 7, 8"	Steps	1	1
16.	"Pretty Fly (For a White Guy)"	The Offspring	1	6 (Note: "Pretty Fly (For a White Guy)" reached No. 1 in December, 1998 and remained in that spot for six weeks until January, 1999. The song stayed in the charts for 22 weeks.)
17.	"The Boy Is Mine"	Brandy & Monica	3	
18.	"Last Thing on My Mind"	Steps	5	
19.	"Lollipop (Candyman)"	Aqua	3	
20.	"Doctor Jones"	Aqua	1	7 (Note: "Doctor Jones" reached No. 1 in the last week of December, 1997 and remained in that spot for a further six weeks until February, 1998. The song stayed in the charts for a total of 15 weeks.)
21.	"Rollercoaster"	B*Witched	1	2
22.	"Finally Found"	Honeyz	3	
23.	"Viva Forever"	Spice Girls	2	
24.	"If You Could Read My Mind"	Stars on 54	3	
25.	"When the Lights Go Out"	Five	2	
26.	"C'est la Vie"	B*Witched	6	
27.	"Together Again"	Janet Jackson	4	
28.	"As Long as You Love Me"	Backstreet Boys	2	
29.	"Buses and Trains"	Bachelor Girl	4	
30.	"You Sexy Thing"	T.Shirt	6	
31.	"Everybody Get Up"	Five	5	
32.	"All I Have to Give"	Backstreet Boys	4	
33.	"I'll Never Break Your Heart"	Backstreet Boys	10	
34.	"Horny '98"	Mousse T. feat. Hot 'n' Juicy	13	
35.	"This Is How We Party"	S.O.A.P.	7	
36.	"Music Sounds Better with You"	Stardust	4	
37.	"Torn"	Natalie Imbruglia	2	
38.	"Life"	Des'ree	8	
39.	"Stop"	Spice Girls	5	
40.	"Kung Fu Fighting"	Bus Stop	15	
41.	"Cherish	Pappa Bear	7	
42.	"Big Mistake"	Natalie Imbruglia	6	
43.	"Believe"	Cher	1	5
44.	"Frozen"	Madonna	5	
45.	"Under the Bridge"	All Saints	5	
46.	"Tubthumping"	Chumbawamba	1	3
47.	"You Make Me Wanna..."	Usher	6	
48.	"The Way"	Fastball	14	
49.	"Thank U"	Alanis Morissette	15	
50.	"Turn Back Time"	Aqua	10	
51.	"Fight for Your Right (To Party)"	N.Y.C.C.	12	
52.	"Gettin' Jiggy wit It"	Will Smith	6	
53.	"Brick"	Ben Folds Five	13	
54.	"The Impression That I Get"	The Mighty Mighty Bosstones	11	
55.	"Sweetest Thing"	U2	6	
56.	"Twisted (Excuse Me)"	Wayne G	19	
57.	"Ray of Light"	Madonna	6	
58.	"Sway"	Bic Runga	10	
59.	"Sex and Candy"	Marcy Playground	8	
60.	"No Matter What"	Boyzone	5	
61.	"Pash"	Kate Ceberano	10	
62.	"Come with Me	Puff Daddy feat. Jimmy Page	10	
63.	"Gotta Be...Movin' on Up"	P.M. Dawn feat. Ky-Mani	13	
64.	"The Unforgiven II"	Metallica	9	
65.	"Casanova"	Ultimate Kaos	18	
66.	"I Wanna Be the Only One"	Eternal	10	
67.	"Polyester Girl"	Regurgitator	14	
68.	"Outside"	George Michael	13	
69.	"Crush on You"	Aaron Carter	9	
70.	"When You're Gone"	Bryan Adams	4	
71.	"One Week"	Barenaked Ladies	16	
72.	"I'm Your Angel"	Celine Dion & R. Kelly	31	
73.	"All Cried Out"	Allure	11	
74.	"Ladidi Ladida"	S.O.A.P.	15	
75.	"Too Much"	Spice Girls	9	
76.	"Fuel"	Metallica	2	
77.	"Cruel"	Human Nature	14	
78.	"The Things I Love in You"	Cold Chisel	10	
79.	"When You Believe"	Mariah Carey & Whitney Houston	13	
80.	"Pushing Buttons"	Grinspoon	13	
81.	"Turn the Page"	Metallica	11	
82.	"Feel It"	The Tamperer featuring Maya	19	
83.	"Too Close"	Next	12	
84.	"Weird"	Hanson	12	
85.	"I Know Where It's At"	All Saints	12	
86.	"Coco Jamboo"	Mr. President	7	
87.	"Grease: The Remix EP"	Olivia Newton-John & John Travolta	27	
88.	"It's Tricky"	Run-DMC vs. Jason Nevins	15	
89.	"I Don't Like It"	Pauline Pantsdown	10	
90.	"Cry"	The Mavis's	13	
91.	"Uh La La La"	Alexia	17	
92.	"Now I Can Dance"	Tina Arena	13	
93.	"Jackie"	B.Z. feat. Joanne	3	
94.	"Can't Get Enough of You Baby"	Smash Mouth	14	
95.	"Walkin' on the Sun"	Smash Mouth	7	
96.	"Thinking of You"	Hanson	6	
97.	"Just the Two of Us"	Will Smith	27	
98.	"Because We Want To"	Billie	19	
99.	"Goodbye"	Spice Girls	3	
100.	"Addicted to Bass"	Josh Abrahams & Amiel Daemion	15	
