= List of top 25 albums for 1998 in Australia =

Top 25 albums of 1998 < 1997 1999 >

Other Australian top charts for 1998
- top 25 singles
- Triple J Hottest 100

Australian number-one charts of 1998
- albums
- singles

The following lists the top 100 albums of 1998 in Australia from the Australian Recording Industry Association (ARIA) End of Year Albums Chart.

#	Title	Artist	Highest pos. reached	Weeks at No. 1
1.	Yourself or Someone Like You	Matchbox 20	1	6
2.	Aquarium	Aqua	1	2
3.	Titanic	Soundtrack	1	11
4.	Backstreet's Back	Backstreet Boys	2	
5.	Left of the Middle	Natalie Imbruglia	1	3
6.	The Best of 1980–1990	U2	1	5 (Note: The Best of 1980–1990 debuted at #1 in November, 1998 and reached #1 again in January, 1999)
7.	Come On Over	Shania Twain	1	20 (Note: Come On Over debuted on the charts in November, 1997 reaching #1 in February–March, 1999, in May, 1999 and again in August–September, 1999. It remained in the charts until September, 2000.)
8.	Highlights from The Main Event	John Farnham, Olivia Newton-John, Anthony Warlow	1	2
9.	Spiceworld	Spice Girls	2	
10.	Ray of Light	Madonna	1	1
11.	Let's Talk About Love	Celine Dion	1	5 (Note: Let's Talk About Love debuted at #1 in November, 1997 and reached #1 again in January, 1998. It remained in the charts until November, 1998.)
12.	Romanza	Andrea Bocelli	2	
13.	Chef Aid: The South Park Album	Soundtrack	1	1
14.	All Saints	All Saints	4	
15.	Hits	Phil Collins	2	
16.	Ladies and Gentlemen ... The Best of	George Michael	2	
17.	The Wedding Singer	Soundtrack	1	1
18.	Supposed Former Infatuation Junkie	Alanis Morissette	2	
19.	Songs from Ally McBeal	Vonda Shepard	1	1
20.	Unit	Regurgitator	4	
21.	The Last Wave of Summer	Cold Chisel	1	1
22.	Americana	The Offspring	1	5 (Note: Americana debuted on the charts in November, 1998 reaching #1 in January–February, 1999. It remained in the charts until October, 1999.)
23.	Eternal Nightcap	The Whitlams	14	
24.	5ive	Five	8	
25.	Grease	Soundtrack	1	4 (Note: Grease entered the charts in May, 1991 reaching #1 in July, 1991. It remained in the charts until December, 1991. It re-entered the charts in May, 1998 and peaked at #1 in August, 1998 where it remained in the charts until November, 1998)
26.	Vuelve	Ricky Martin	2	
27.	City of Angels	Soundtrack	1	2
28.	Yield	Pearl Jam	1	1
29.	The Living End	The Living End	1	2
30.	B*Witched	B*Witched	5	
31.	Impossible Princess	Kylie Minogue	4	
32.	Urban Hymns	The Verve	9	
33.	Postcards from Heaven	Lighthouse Family	2	
34.	Talk on Corners	The Corrs	3	
35.	Step One	Steps	5	
36.	Garage Inc.	Metallica	2	
37.	Sumo	The Superjesus	2	
38.	Spice	Spice Girls	3	
39.	Sultans of Swing: The Very Best of Dire Straits	Dire Straits	4	
40.	On Eagle's Wings	Michael Crawford	5	
41.	Pieces of You	Jewel	5	
42.	VH1 Divas Live	Celine Dion, Mariah Carey, Gloria Estefan, Aretha Franklin, Shania Twain	12	
43.	#1's	Mariah Carey	6	
44.	Try Whistling This	Neil Finn	1	2
45.	These Are Special Times	Celine Dion	6	
46.	Dude Ranch	Blink-182	25	
47.	Adore	The Smashing Pumpkins	1	1
48.	Whatever and Ever Amen	Ben Folds Five	8	
49.	Follow the Leader	Korn	1	1
50.	Lemon Parade	Tonic	12	
51.	The Full Monty	Soundtrack	3	
52.	Sketches for My Sweetheart the Drunk	Jeff Buckley	1	1
53.	Mezzanine	Massive Attack	1	1
54.	Slightly Odway	Jebediah	7	
55.	Backstreet Boys	Backstreet Boys	6	
56.	Nimrod	Green Day	3	
57.	Spirit	Jewel	5	
58.	The Best That I Could Do 1978–1988	John Mellencamp	5	
59.	My Best Friend's Wedding	Soundtrack	1	4
60.	Savage Garden	Savage Garden	1	19
61.	Hat Town	Lee Kernaghan	7	
62.	Songs from the South	Paul Kelly	2	
63.	Live on Two Legs	Pearl Jam	4	
64.	Guide to Better Living	Grinspoon	11	
65.	Godzilla: The Album	Soundtrack	8	
66.	Internationalist	Powderfinger	1	1
67.	Paint the Sky with Stars	Enya	10	
68.	Who Cares a Lot? The Greatest Hits	Faith No More	4	
69.	The Best of Nick Cave and The Bad Seeds	Nick Cave and the Bad Seeds	2	
70.	Hello Nasty	Beastie Boys	1	1
71.	The Greatest Hits	INXS	2	
72.	20,000 Watt R.S.L.	Midnight Oil	1	1
73.	Anthology 1: Greatest Hits 1986–1997	John Farnham	1	1
74.	Viaggio Italiano	Andrea Bocelli	15	
75.	Reload	Metallica	2	
76.	Mechanical Animals	Marilyn Manson	1	1
77.	Let's Face It	The Mighty Mighty Bosstones	27	
78.	Armageddon: The Album	Soundtrack	5	
79.	I'm Telling You for the Last Time	Jerry Seinfeld	11	
80.	3 Car Garage	Hanson	3	
81.	Version 2.0	Garbage	5	
82.	The Velvet Rope	Janet Jackson	4	
83.	Celebrity Skin	Hole	4	
84.	Eat Your Peas	Martin/Molloy	27	
85.	In Deep	Tina Arena	1	3
86.	OK Computer	Radiohead	7	
87.	The Best of Van Morrison	Van Morrison	1	3
88.	Waiting for the Day	Bachelor Girl	20	
89.	Premonition	John Fogerty	25	
90.	The Ultimate Collection	Creedence Clearwater Revival	10	
91.	The Wedding Singer 2	Soundtrack	8	
92.	The Best of Wham!: If You Were There...	Wham!	29	
93.	In My Life	George Martin	7	
94.	Back to Titanic	James Horner	7	
95.	The Very Best of the Bee Gees	Bee Gees	7	
96.	No. 4 Record	You Am I	1	1
97.	Chisel	Cold Chisel	3	
98.	Ixnay on the Hombre	The Offspring	2	
99.	Led Zeppelin Remasters	Led Zeppelin	1	1
100.	(Songbook) A Collection of Hits	Trisha Yearwood	22	

Peak chart positions from 1998 are from the ARIA Charts, overall position on the End of Year Chart is calculated by ARIA based on the number of weeks and position that the records reach within the Top 50 albums for each week during 1998.
