= List of number-one singles in Australia during the 1990s =

Australian number-one singles of the 1990s < 1980s 2000 >

Triple J Hottest 100
- 1990 1991 1993 1994; 1995 1996 1997 1998 1999

Australian top 25 singles
- 1990 1991 1992 1993 1994; 1995 1996 1997 1998 1999

Australian top 25 albums
- 1990 1991 1992 1993 1994; 1995 1996 1997 1998 1999

The following lists the number one singles on the Australian Singles Chart, along with other substantial hits, during the 1990s. The source for this decade is the ARIA Charts.

Key
The yellow background indicates the #1 song on ARIA's End of Year Chart (Note: Annual charts are sourced from the ARIA.com.au website:)
The light blue background indicates the #1 song on ARIA's End of Decade Chart

== 1990 ==
Date	Artist	Single	Weeks at number one
6 January	The B-52's	"Love Shack"	8 weeks
13 January	The B-52's	"Love Shack"	8 weeks
20 January	The B-52's	"Love Shack"	8 weeks
27 January	The B-52's	"Love Shack"	8 weeks
3 February	The B-52's	"Love Shack"	8 weeks
10 February	The B-52's	"Love Shack"	8 weeks
17 February	Aerosmith	"Janie's Got a Gun"	1 week
24 February	Sinéad O'Connor	"Nothing Compares 2 U"	8 weeks
3 March	Sinéad O'Connor	"Nothing Compares 2 U"	8 weeks
10 March	Sinéad O'Connor	"Nothing Compares 2 U"	8 weeks
17 March	Sinéad O'Connor	"Nothing Compares 2 U"	8 weeks
24 March	Sinéad O'Connor	"Nothing Compares 2 U"	8 weeks
31 March	Sinéad O'Connor	"Nothing Compares 2 U"	8 weeks
7 April	Sinéad O'Connor	"Nothing Compares 2 U"	8 weeks
14 April	Sinéad O'Connor	"Nothing Compares 2 U"	8 weeks
21 April	Paula Abdul	"Opposites Attract"	2 weeks
28 April	Paula Abdul	"Opposites Attract"	2 weeks
5 May	Madonna	"Vogue"/"Keep It Together"	5 weeks
12 May	Madonna	"Vogue"/"Keep It Together"	5 weeks
19 May	Madonna	"Vogue"/"Keep It Together"	5 weeks
26 May	Madonna	"Vogue"/"Keep It Together"	5 weeks
2 June	Madonna	"Vogue"/"Keep It Together"	5 weeks
9 June	Heart	"All I Wanna Do Is Make Love to You"	4 weeks
16 June	Heart	"All I Wanna Do Is Make Love to You"	4 weeks
23 June	Heart	"All I Wanna Do Is Make Love to You"	4 weeks
30 June	Heart	"All I Wanna Do Is Make Love to You"	4 weeks
7 July	Roxette	"It Must Have Been Love"	2 weeks
14 July	Roxette	"It Must Have Been Love"	2 weeks
21 July	MC Hammer	"U Can't Touch This"	5 weeks
28 July	MC Hammer	"U Can't Touch This"	5 weeks
4 August	MC Hammer	"U Can't Touch This"	5 weeks
11 August	MC Hammer	"U Can't Touch This"	5 weeks
18 August	MC Hammer	"U Can't Touch This"	5 weeks
25 August	Faith No More	"Epic"	3 weeks
1 September	Faith No More	"Epic"	3 weeks
8 September	Faith No More	"Epic"	3 weeks
15 September	Jon Bon Jovi	"Blaze of Glory"	6 weeks
22 September	Jon Bon Jovi	"Blaze of Glory"	6 weeks
29 September	Jon Bon Jovi	"Blaze of Glory"	6 weeks
6 October	Jon Bon Jovi	"Blaze of Glory"	6 weeks
13 October	Jon Bon Jovi	"Blaze of Glory"	6 weeks
20 October	Jon Bon Jovi	"Blaze of Glory"	6 weeks
27 October	Young MC	"Bust a Move"	1 week
3 November	Skyhooks	"Jukebox in Siberia"	2 weeks
10 November	Skyhooks	"Jukebox in Siberia"	2 weeks
17 November	Deee-Lite	"Groove Is in the Heart"	1 week
24 November	The Righteous Brothers	"Unchained Melody"	7 weeks
1 December	The Righteous Brothers	"Unchained Melody"	7 weeks
8 December	The Righteous Brothers	"Unchained Melody"	7 weeks
15 December	The Righteous Brothers	"Unchained Melody"	7 weeks
22 December	The Righteous Brothers	"Unchained Melody"	7 weeks
29 December	The Righteous Brothers	"Unchained Melody"	7 weeks

Top 5 singles by Australian and New Zealand artists

1. "Better the Devil You Know" – Kylie Minogue
2. "Mona" – Craig McLachlan and Check 1–2
3. "I Need Your Body" – Tina Arena
4. "Crying in the Chapel" – Peter Blakeley
5. "Lay Down Your Guns" – Jimmy Barnes
6. "Show No Mercy" – Mark Williams

Other hits
Songs which peaked at number two included "I Feel the Earth Move" by Martika, "I Want That Man" by Deborah Harry, "Ride On Time" by Black Box, "Don't Know Much" by Linda Ronstadt featuring Aaron Neville, "How Am I Supposed to Live Without You" by Michael Bolton, "Hold On" by Wilson Phillips, "Joey" by Concrete Blonde, "Close to You" by Maxi Priest, and "Suicide Blonde" by INXS.

Songs which peaked at number three were "Crying in the Chapel" by Peter Blakeley, "Black Velvet" by Alannah Myles, "Girl I'm Gonna Miss You" by Milli Vanilli, "How Can We Be Lovers?" by Michael Bolton, "Mona" by Craig McLachlan & Check 1–2, "I Need Your Body" by Tina Arena, "Doin' the Do" by Betty Boo, and "Show Me Heaven" by Maria McKee.

Other major hits (with their peak positions noted) included "Lay Down Your Guns" (4) by Jimmy Barnes, "I Don't Want to Be with Nobody but You" (4) by Absent Friends, "Pump Up the Jam" (4) by Technotronic featuring Felly, "Love and Kisses" (4) by Dannii Minogue, "Justify My Love" (4) by Madonna, "Lambada" (5) by Kaoma, "Chain Reaction" (6) by John Farnham, "Summer Rain" (6) by Belinda Carlisle, "Sacrifice" (7) by Elton John, "Hanky Panky" (6) by Madonna, "Blue Sky Mine" (8) by Midnight Oil, "Step by Step" (8) by New Kids on the Block and "Vision of Love" (9) by Mariah Carey.

== 1991 ==
Date	Artist	Single	Weeks at number one
5 January	The Righteous Brothers	"Unchained Melody"	7 weeks
12 January	Vanilla Ice	"Ice Ice Baby"	3 weeks
19 January	Vanilla Ice	"Ice Ice Baby"	3 weeks
26 January	Vanilla Ice	"Ice Ice Baby"	3 weeks
2 February	Divinyls	"I Touch Myself"	2 weeks
9 February	Divinyls	"I Touch Myself"	2 weeks
16 February	Londonbeat	"I've Been Thinking About You"	4 weeks
23 February	Londonbeat	"I've Been Thinking About You"	4 weeks
2 March	Londonbeat	"I've Been Thinking About You"	4 weeks
9 March	Londonbeat	"I've Been Thinking About You"	4 weeks
16 March	The Simpsons	"Do the Bartman"	1 week
23 March	Dimples D.	"Sucker DJ (A Witch for Love)"	2 weeks
30 March	Dimples D.	"Sucker DJ (A Witch for Love)"	2 weeks
6 April	Julee Cruise	"Falling"	1 week
13 April	Roxette	"Joyride"	3 weeks
20 April	Roxette	"Joyride"	3 weeks
27 April	Roxette	"Joyride"	3 weeks
4 May	Ratcat	Tingles EP	2 weeks
11 May	Ratcat	Tingles EP	2 weeks
18 May	Daryl Braithwaite	"The Horses"	2 weeks
25 May	Daryl Braithwaite	"The Horses"	2 weeks
1 June	Ratcat	"Don't Go Now"	1 week
8 June	Olivia Newton-John and John Travolta	"The Grease Megamix"	5 weeks
15 June	Olivia Newton-John and John Travolta	"The Grease Megamix"	5 weeks
22 June	Olivia Newton-John and John Travolta	"The Grease Megamix"	5 weeks
29 June	Olivia Newton-John and John Travolta	"The Grease Megamix"	5 weeks
6 July	Olivia Newton-John and John Travolta	"The Grease Megamix"	5 weeks
13 July	Melissa	"Read My Lips"	2 weeks
20 July	Melissa	"Read My Lips"	2 weeks
27 July	Bryan Adams	"(Everything I Do) I Do It for You"	11 weeks
3 August	Bryan Adams	"(Everything I Do) I Do It for You"	11 weeks
10 August	Bryan Adams	"(Everything I Do) I Do It for You"	11 weeks
17 August	Bryan Adams	"(Everything I Do) I Do It for You"	11 weeks
24 August	Bryan Adams	"(Everything I Do) I Do It for You"	11 weeks
31 August	Bryan Adams	"(Everything I Do) I Do It for You"	11 weeks
7 September	Bryan Adams	"(Everything I Do) I Do It for You"	11 weeks
14 September	Bryan Adams	"(Everything I Do) I Do It for You"	11 weeks
21 September	Bryan Adams	"(Everything I Do) I Do It for You"	11 weeks
28 September	Bryan Adams	"(Everything I Do) I Do It for You"	11 weeks
5 October	Bryan Adams	"(Everything I Do) I Do It for You"	11 weeks
12 October	Martika	"Love... Thy Will Be Done"	1 week
19 October	Big Audio Dynamite	"Rush"	2 weeks
26 October	Big Audio Dynamite	"Rush"	2 weeks
2 November	U2	"The Fly"	1 week
9 November	Right Said Fred	"I'm Too Sexy"	3 weeks
16 November	Right Said Fred	"I'm Too Sexy"	3 weeks
23 November	Right Said Fred	"I'm Too Sexy"	3 weeks
30 November	Michael Jackson	"Black or White"	8 weeks
7 December	Michael Jackson	"Black or White"	8 weeks
14 December	Michael Jackson	"Black or White"	8 weeks
21 December	Michael Jackson	"Black or White"	8 weeks
28 December	Michael Jackson	"Black or White"	8 weeks

Top 5 singles by Australian and New Zealand artists

1. Tingles (EP) – Ratcat
2. "The Horses" – Daryl Braithwaite
3. "Read My Lips" – Melissa
4. "I Touch Myself" – Divinyls
5. "Better" – The Screaming Jets

Other hits
Songs which peaked at number two included "Sadeness (Part I)" by Enigma, "Rhythm of My Heart" by Rod Stewart, "Rush Rush" by Paula Abdul, "Unforgettable" by Natalie Cole and Nat King Cole, "More Than Words" by Extreme, and "Break in the Weather" by Jenny Morris.

Songs which peaked at number three were "Fantasy" by Black Box, "Gonna Make You Sweat (Everybody Dance Now)" by C+C Music Factory, "Wiggle It" by 2 in a Room, "How to Dance" by Bingoboys featuring Princessa, "3 a.m. Eternal" by The KLF, "You Could Be Mine" by Guns N' Roses, "Here I Am (Come and Take Me)" by UB40, "Sexy (Is the Word)" by Melissa, "When Something Is Wrong with My Baby" by John Farnham and Jimmy Barnes, and "Mysterious Ways" by U2.

Other major hits (with peak positions shown), included "Better" (4) by The Screaming Jets, "The Shoop Shoop Song (It's in His Kiss)" (4) by Cher, "I Wanna Sex You Up" (4) by Color Me Badd, "I've Got To Go Now" (5) by Toni Childs, "Ain't No Sunshine" (5) by the Rockmelons featuring Deni Hines, "Burn for You" (5) by John Farnham, "Black Cat" (6) by Janet Jackson, "When Your Love Is Gone" (7) by Jimmy Barnes, "Set Adrift on Memory Bliss" (7) by P.M. Dawn, "From a Distance" (8) by Bette Midler, "Can't Stop This Thing We Started" (9) by Bryan Adams, "Where the Streets Have No Name (I Can't Take My Eyes off You)" (9) by the Pet Shop Boys, "Crazy" (9) by Seal, "It Ain't Over 'til It's Over" (10) by Lenny Kravitz, "Treaty" (11) by Yothu Yindi, "Where Are You Now?" (13) by Roxus.

== 1992 ==
Date	Artist	Single	Weeks at number one
4 January	Michael Jackson	"Black or White"	8 weeks
11 January	Michael Jackson	"Black or White"	8 weeks
18 January	Michael Jackson	"Black or White"	8 weeks
25 January	Salt-N-Pepa	"Let's Talk About Sex"	4 weeks
1 February	Salt-N-Pepa	"Let's Talk About Sex"	4 weeks
8 February	Salt-N-Pepa	"Let's Talk About Sex"	4 weeks
15 February	Salt-N-Pepa	"Let's Talk About Sex"	4 weeks
22 February	Euphoria	"Love You Right"	2 weeks
29 February	Euphoria	"Love You Right"	2 weeks
7 March	Julian Lennon	"Saltwater"	4 weeks
14 March	Julian Lennon	"Saltwater"	4 weeks
21 March	Julian Lennon	"Saltwater"	4 weeks
28 March	Julian Lennon	"Saltwater"	4 weeks
4 April	The Twelfth Man featuring MCG Hammer	"Marvellous!"	2 weeks
11 April	The Twelfth Man featuring MCG Hammer	"Marvellous!"	2 weeks
18 April	Red Hot Chili Peppers	"Under the Bridge"	4 weeks
25 April	Red Hot Chili Peppers	"Under the Bridge"	4 weeks
2 May	Red Hot Chili Peppers	"Under the Bridge"	4 weeks
9 May	Red Hot Chili Peppers	"Under the Bridge"	4 weeks
16 May	Mr. Big	"To Be with You"	3 weeks
23 May	Mr. Big	"To Be with You"	3 weeks
30 May	Mr. Big	"To Be with You"	3 weeks
6 June	Euphoria	"One in a Million"	1 week
13 June	Girlfriend	"Take It from Me"	2 weeks
20 June	Girlfriend	"Take It from Me"	2 weeks
27 June	Kris Kross	"Jump"	3 weeks
4 July	Kris Kross	"Jump"	3 weeks
11 July	Kris Kross	"Jump"	3 weeks
18 July	Vanessa Williams	"Save the Best for Last"	1 week
25 July	Richard Marx	"Hazard"	3 weeks
1 August	Richard Marx	"Hazard"	3 weeks
8 August	Richard Marx	"Hazard"	3 weeks
15 August	José Carreras and Sarah Brightman	"Amigos Para Siempre"	6 weeks
22 August	José Carreras and Sarah Brightman	"Amigos Para Siempre"	6 weeks
29 August	José Carreras and Sarah Brightman	"Amigos Para Siempre"	6 weeks
5 September	José Carreras and Sarah Brightman	"Amigos Para Siempre"	6 weeks
12 September	José Carreras and Sarah Brightman	"Amigos Para Siempre"	6 weeks
19 September	José Carreras and Sarah Brightman	"Amigos Para Siempre"	6 weeks
26 September	Bobby Brown	"Humpin' Around"	1 week
3 October	Billy Ray Cyrus	"Achy Breaky Heart"	7 weeks
10 October	Billy Ray Cyrus	"Achy Breaky Heart"	7 weeks
17 October	Billy Ray Cyrus	"Achy Breaky Heart"	7 weeks
24 October	Billy Ray Cyrus	"Achy Breaky Heart"	7 weeks
31 October	Billy Ray Cyrus	"Achy Breaky Heart"	7 weeks
7 November	Billy Ray Cyrus	"Achy Breaky Heart"	7 weeks
14 November	Billy Ray Cyrus	"Achy Breaky Heart"	7 weeks
21 November	Boyz II Men	"End of the Road"	4 weeks
28 November	Boyz II Men	"End of the Road"	4 weeks
5 December	Boyz II Men	"End of the Road"	4 weeks
12 December	Boyz II Men	"End of the Road"	4 weeks
19 December	Whitney Houston	"I Will Always Love You"	10 weeks
26 December	Whitney Houston	"I Will Always Love You"	10 weeks

Top 5 singles by Australian and New Zealand artists

1. "The Day You Went Away" by Wendy Matthews
2. "Take It from Me" – Girlfriend
3. "Ordinary Angels" (Clunk (EP)) – Frente!
4. "Way Out West" – James Blundell and James Reyne
5. "Love You Right" – Euphoria

Other hits
Songs which peaked at number two included "Cream" by Prince and The New Power Generation, "Rocket Man" by Kate Bush, "Get Ready for This" by 2 Unlimited, "Way Out West" by James Blundell and James Reyne, "Please Don't Go" by KWS, "Life Is a Highway" by Tom Cochrane, "The Best Things in Life Are Free" by Janet Jackson and Luther Vandross, and "The Day You Went Away" by Wendy Matthews.

Songs which peaked at number three were "Don't Let the Sun Go Down on Me" by Elton John and George Michael, "Justified & Ancient (Stand by The JAMs)" by The KLF, "Dizzy" by Vic Reeves and The Wonder Stuff, "Stay" by Shakespears Sister, Clunk (EP) by Frente!, "Too Funky" by George Michael, "Rhythm Is a Dancer" by Snap!, "Love Is in the Air" by John Paul Young, and "Would I Lie to You?" by Charles & Eddie.

Other major hits (with their peak positions noted) included As Ugly as They Wanna Be (EP) (4) by Ugly Kid Joe, "That Word (L.O.V.E.)" (4) by the Rockmelons featuring Deni Hines, "Erotica" (4) by Madonna, "November Rain" (5) by Guns N' Roses, "Smells Like Teen Spirit" (5) by Nirvana, "Cry" (5) by Lisa Edwards, "In the Closet" (5) and "Remember the Time" (6) by Michael Jackson, "Not a Day Goes By" (5) and "Heaven Knows" (6) by Rick Price, "Everything's Alright" (6) by John Farnham, Kate Ceberano and Jon Stevens, "Be My Baby" (6) by Teen Queens, "Damn I Wish I Was Your Lover" (7) by Sophie B. Hawkins, "I Can Feel It" (7) by Radio Freedom, "Gett Off" (8) by Prince and The New Power Generation and "This Used to Be My Playground" (9) by Madonna.

== 1993 ==
Date	Artist	Single	Weeks at number one
2 January	Whitney Houston	"I Will Always Love You"	10 weeks
9 January	Whitney Houston	"I Will Always Love You"	10 weeks
16 January	Whitney Houston	"I Will Always Love You"	10 weeks
23 January	Whitney Houston	"I Will Always Love You"	10 weeks
30 January	Whitney Houston	"I Will Always Love You"	10 weeks
6 February	Whitney Houston	"I Will Always Love You"	10 weeks
13 February	Whitney Houston	"I Will Always Love You"	10 weeks
20 February	Whitney Houston	"I Will Always Love You"	10 weeks
27 February	Sonia Dada	"You Don't Treat Me No Good"	4 weeks
6 March	Sonia Dada	"You Don't Treat Me No Good"	4 weeks
13 March	Sonia Dada	"You Don't Treat Me No Good"	4 weeks
20 March	Sonia Dada	"You Don't Treat Me No Good"	4 weeks
27 March	Ugly Kid Joe	"Cats in the Cradle"	1 week
3 April	Lenny Kravitz	"Are You Gonna Go My Way"	6 weeks
10 April	Lenny Kravitz	"Are You Gonna Go My Way"	6 weeks
17 April	Lenny Kravitz	"Are You Gonna Go My Way"	6 weeks
24 April	Lenny Kravitz	"Are You Gonna Go My Way"	6 weeks
1 May	Lenny Kravitz	"Are You Gonna Go My Way"	6 weeks
8 May	Lenny Kravitz	"Are You Gonna Go My Way"	6 weeks
15 May	Faith No More	"Easy"	2 weeks
22 May	Faith No More	"Easy"	2 weeks
29 May	Janet Jackson	"That's the Way Love Goes"	1 week
5 June	Snow	"Informer"	5 weeks
12 June	Snow	"Informer"	5 weeks
19 June	Snow	"Informer"	5 weeks
26 June	Snow	"Informer"	5 weeks
3 July	Snow	"Informer"	5 weeks
10 July	UB40	"(I Can't Help) Falling in Love with You"	7 weeks
17 July	UB40	"(I Can't Help) Falling in Love with You"	7 weeks
24 July	UB40	"(I Can't Help) Falling in Love with You"	7 weeks
31 July	UB40	"(I Can't Help) Falling in Love with You"	7 weeks
7 August	UB40	"(I Can't Help) Falling in Love with You"	7 weeks
14 August	UB40	"(I Can't Help) Falling in Love with You"	7 weeks
21 August	UB40	"(I Can't Help) Falling in Love with You"	7 weeks
28 August	Billy Joel	"The River of Dreams"	1 week
4 September	Meat Loaf	"I'd Do Anything for Love (But I Won't Do That)"	8 weeks
11 September	Meat Loaf	"I'd Do Anything for Love (But I Won't Do That)"	8 weeks
18 September	Meat Loaf	"I'd Do Anything for Love (But I Won't Do That)"	8 weeks
25 September	Meat Loaf	"I'd Do Anything for Love (But I Won't Do That)"	8 weeks
2 October	Meat Loaf	"I'd Do Anything for Love (But I Won't Do That)"	8 weeks
9 October	Meat Loaf	"I'd Do Anything for Love (But I Won't Do That)"	8 weeks
16 October	Meat Loaf	"I'd Do Anything for Love (But I Won't Do That)"	8 weeks
23 October	Meat Loaf	"I'd Do Anything for Love (But I Won't Do That)"	8 weeks
30 October	Culture Beat	"Mr. Vain"	1 week
6 November	Ace of Base	"All That She Wants"	3 weeks
13 November	Ace of Base	"All That She Wants"	3 weeks
20 November	Ace of Base	"All That She Wants"	3 weeks
27 November	Bryan Adams	"Please Forgive Me"	7 weeks
4 December	Bryan Adams	"Please Forgive Me"	7 weeks
11 December	Bryan Adams	"Please Forgive Me"	7 weeks
18 December	Bryan Adams	"Please Forgive Me"	7 weeks
25 December	Bryan Adams	"Please Forgive Me"	7 weeks

Top 5 singles by Australian and New Zealand artists

1. "Gimme Little Sign" – Peter Andre
2. "Stone Cold" – Jimmy Barnes
3. "This Is It" – Dannii Minogue
4. "You Were There" – Southern Sons
5. "Accidently Kelly Street" – Frente!

Other hits
Songs which peaked at number two were "Can't Get Enough of Your Love" by Taylor Dayne, "Sweat (A La La La La Long)" by Inner Circle, "What's Up?" by 4 Non Blondes, and "Dreams" by Gabrielle.

Songs which peaked at number 3 were "How Do You Talk to an Angel" by The Heights, "December 1963 (Oh, What a Night)" (Remix) by Frankie Valli and the Four Seasons, "You Ain't Thinking (About Me)" by Sonia Dada, "Gimme Little Sign" by Peter Andre, "Two Princes" by Spin Doctors, "Freak Me" by Silk, and "If I Can't Have You" by Kim Wilde.

Other major hits (with peak positions noted) included "Accidently Kelly Street" (4) by Frente!, "House of Love" (4) by East 17, "Give In to Me" (4) by Michael Jackson, "Dreams" (4) by Gabrielle, "The Key: The Secret" (4) by Urban Cookie Collective, "Would I Lie to You?" (4) by Charles & Eddie, "Oh Carolina" (4) by Shaggy, "Rain" (5) by Madonna, "Sexy MF" (5) and "My Name Is Prince" (9) by Prince and The New Power Generation, "The Floor" (5) by Johnny Gill, "Creep" (6) by Radiohead, "Everybody Hurts" (6) by R.E.M., "Dreamlover" (7) by Mariah Carey, "Believe" (8) by Lenny Kravitz and "Go West" (10) by the Pet Shop Boys.

Hits by Australasian artists also included "The Weight" (6) by Jimmy Barnes and The Badloves, "I Want You" (10) and "In Your Room" (10) both by Toni Pearen, "You're So Vain" (11) by Chocolate Starfish and "Funky Junky" (13) by Peter Andre.

== 1994 ==
Date	Artist	Single	Weeks at number one
1 January	Bryan Adams	"Please Forgive Me"	7 weeks
8 January	Bryan Adams	"Please Forgive Me"	7 weeks
15 January	DJ Jazzy Jeff & The Fresh Prince	"Boom! Shake the Room"	1 week
22 January	Bryan Adams, Rod Stewart and Sting	"All for Love"	2 weeks
29 January	Bryan Adams, Rod Stewart and Sting	"All for Love"	2 weeks
5 February	Cut 'N' Move	"Give It Up"	4 weeks
12 February	Cut 'N' Move	"Give It Up"	4 weeks
19 February	Cut 'N' Move	"Give It Up"	4 weeks
26 February	Cut 'N' Move	"Give It Up"	4 weeks
5 March	East 17	"It's Alright"	7 weeks
12 March	East 17	"It's Alright"	7 weeks
19 March	East 17	"It's Alright"	7 weeks
26 March	East 17	"It's Alright"	7 weeks
2 April	East 17	"It's Alright"	7 weeks
9 April	East 17	"It's Alright"	7 weeks
16 April	East 17	"It's Alright"	7 weeks
23 April	Celine Dion	"The Power of Love"	1 week
30 April	Ace of Base	"The Sign"	4 weeks
7 May	Ace of Base	"The Sign"	4 weeks
14 May	Ace of Base	"The Sign"	4 weeks
21 May	Ace of Base	"The Sign"	4 weeks
28 May	Prince	"The Most Beautiful Girl in the World"	2 weeks
4 June	Prince	"The Most Beautiful Girl in the World"	2 weeks
11 June	Crash Test Dummies	"Mmm Mmm Mmm Mmm"	3 weeks
18 June	Crash Test Dummies	"Mmm Mmm Mmm Mmm"	3 weeks
25 June	Crash Test Dummies	"Mmm Mmm Mmm Mmm"	3 weeks
2 July	Wet Wet Wet	"Love Is All Around"	6 weeks
9 July	Wet Wet Wet	"Love Is All Around"	6 weeks
16 July	Wet Wet Wet	"Love Is All Around"	6 weeks
23 July	Wet Wet Wet	"Love Is All Around"	6 weeks
30 July	Wet Wet Wet	"Love Is All Around"	6 weeks
6 August	Wet Wet Wet	"Love Is All Around"	6 weeks
13 August	All-4-One	"I Swear"	5 weeks
20 August	All-4-One	"I Swear"	5 weeks
27 August	All-4-One	"I Swear"	5 weeks
3 September	All-4-One	"I Swear"	5 weeks
10 September	All-4-One	"I Swear"	5 weeks
17 September	Kylie Minogue	"Confide in Me"	4 weeks
24 September	Kylie Minogue	"Confide in Me"	4 weeks
1 October	Kylie Minogue	"Confide in Me"	4 weeks
8 October	Kylie Minogue	"Confide in Me"	4 weeks
15 October	Boyz II Men	"I'll Make Love to You"	2 weeks
22 October	Boyz II Men	"I'll Make Love to You"	2 weeks
29 October	Silverchair	"Tomorrow"	6 weeks
5 November	Silverchair	"Tomorrow"	6 weeks
12 November	Silverchair	"Tomorrow"	6 weeks
19 November	Silverchair	"Tomorrow"	6 weeks
26 November	Silverchair	"Tomorrow"	6 weeks
3 December	Silverchair	"Tomorrow"	6 weeks
10 December	Sheryl Crow	"All I Wanna Do"	1 week
17 December	The Cranberries	"Zombie"	8 weeks
24 December	The Cranberries	"Zombie"	8 weeks
31 December	The Cranberries	"Zombie"	8 weeks

Top 5 singles by Australian and New Zealand artists

1. "Tomorrow" – Silverchair
2. "Confide in Me" – Kylie Minogue
3. "Chains" – Tina Arena
4. "Mountain" – Chocolate Starfish
5. "Lonely"/"Bizarre Love Triangle" – Frente!

Other hits
Songs which peaked at number two were "Shoop" by Salt-N-Pepa, "Asshole" by Denis Leary, "Slave to the Music" by Twenty 4 Seven, "Said I Loved You...But I Lied" by Michael Bolton, "Whatta Man" by Salt-N-Pepa with En Vogue, "Breathe Again" by Toni Braxton, "Right in the Night (Fall in Love with Music)" by Jam & Spoon featuring Plavka, "Absolutely Fabulous" by Absolutely Fabulous (Pet Shop Boys), "100% Pure Love" by Crystal Waters, "Endless Love" by Mariah Carey and Luther Vandross, "Always" by Bon Jovi, and "All I Want for Christmas Is You" by Mariah Carey.

Songs which peaked at number three were "Without You" by Mariah Carey, "Stay" by Eternal, "Swamp Thing" by The Grid, "7 Seconds" by Youssou N'Dour and Neneh Cherry, "Closer" by Nine Inch Nails, and "Spin the Black Circle" by Pearl Jam.

Other major hits (with peak positions noted) included "Chains" (4) by Tina Arena, "Streets of Philadelphia" (4) by Bruce Springsteen, "Closer" (4) by Nine Inch Nails, "Doop" (4) by Doop, "Around the World" (4) by East 17, "Secret" (5) by Madonna, "Moving on Up" (5) by M People, "Stay (I Missed You)" (5) by Lisa Loeb, "One" (live) (5) by Metallica, "On Bended Knee" (7) by Boyz II Men, "I'll Remember" (7) by Madonna, "Come Out and Play" (8) by The Offspring, "Can You Feel the Love Tonight" (9) by Elton John and "Things Can Only Get Better" (9) by D:Ream.

Hits by Australasian artists also included "Hands Out of My Pocket" (9) by Cold Chisel, "The Winner Is..." (9) by Southend with Nik Fish and "More Wine Waiter Please" (10) by The Poor.

== 1995 ==
Date	Artist	Single	Weeks at number one
7 January	The Cranberries	"Zombie"	8 weeks
14 January	The Cranberries	"Zombie"	8 weeks
21 January	The Cranberries	"Zombie"	8 weeks
28 January	The Cranberries	"Zombie"	8 weeks
4 February	The Cranberries	"Zombie"	8 weeks
11 February	Real McCoy	"Another Night"	6 weeks
18 February	Real McCoy	"Another Night"	6 weeks
25 February	Real McCoy	"Another Night"	6 weeks
4 March	Real McCoy	"Another Night"	6 weeks
11 March	Real McCoy	"Another Night"	6 weeks
18 March	Real McCoy	"Another Night"	6 weeks
25 March	Hocus Pocus	"Here's Johnny!"	6 weeks
1 April	Hocus Pocus	"Here's Johnny!"	6 weeks
8 April	Hocus Pocus	"Here's Johnny!"	6 weeks
15 April	Hocus Pocus	"Here's Johnny!"	6 weeks
22 April	Hocus Pocus	"Here's Johnny!"	6 weeks
29 April	Hocus Pocus	"Here's Johnny!"	6 weeks
6 May	Take That	"Back for Good"	2 weeks
13 May	Take That	"Back for Good"	2 weeks
20 May	Merril Bainbridge	"Mouth"	6 weeks
27 May	Merril Bainbridge	"Mouth"	6 weeks
3 June	Merril Bainbridge	"Mouth"	6 weeks
10 June	Merril Bainbridge	"Mouth"	6 weeks
17 June	Merril Bainbridge	"Mouth"	6 weeks
24 June	Merril Bainbridge	"Mouth"	6 weeks
1 July	Bryan Adams	"Have You Ever Really Loved a Woman?"	1 week
8 July	U2	"Hold Me, Thrill Me, Kiss Me, Kill Me"	6 weeks
15 July	U2	"Hold Me, Thrill Me, Kiss Me, Kill Me"	6 weeks
22 July	U2	"Hold Me, Thrill Me, Kiss Me, Kill Me"	6 weeks
29 July	U2	"Hold Me, Thrill Me, Kiss Me, Kill Me"	6 weeks
5 August	U2	"Hold Me, Thrill Me, Kiss Me, Kill Me"	6 weeks
12 August	U2	"Hold Me, Thrill Me, Kiss Me, Kill Me"	6 weeks
19 August	Jann Arden	"Insensitive"	1 week
26 August	Seal	"Kiss from a Rose"	6 weeks
2 September	Seal	"Kiss from a Rose"	6 weeks
9 September	Seal	"Kiss from a Rose"	6 weeks
16 September	Seal	"Kiss from a Rose"	6 weeks
23 September	Seal	"Kiss from a Rose"	6 weeks
30 September	Seal	"Kiss from a Rose"	6 weeks
7 October	Mariah Carey	"Fantasy"	1 week
14 October	N-Trance	"Stayin' Alive"	1 week
21 October	Coolio featuring L.V.	"Gangsta's Paradise"	13 weeks
28 October	Coolio featuring L.V.	"Gangsta's Paradise"	13 weeks
4 November	Coolio featuring L.V.	"Gangsta's Paradise"	13 weeks
11 November	Coolio featuring L.V.	"Gangsta's Paradise"	13 weeks
18 November	Coolio featuring L.V.	"Gangsta's Paradise"	13 weeks
25 November	Coolio featuring L.V.	"Gangsta's Paradise"	13 weeks
2 December	Coolio featuring L.V.	"Gangsta's Paradise"	13 weeks
9 December	Coolio featuring L.V.	"Gangsta's Paradise"	13 weeks
16 December	Coolio featuring L.V.	"Gangsta's Paradise"	13 weeks
23 December	Coolio featuring L.V.	"Gangsta's Paradise"	13 weeks
30 December	Coolio featuring L.V.	"Gangsta's Paradise"	13 weeks

Top 5 singles by Australian and New Zealand artists

1. "Mouth" – Merril Bainbridge
2. "Let's Groove" – CDB
3. "Tomorrow" – Silverchair
4. "Mysterious Girl" – Peter Andre
5. "Under the Water" – Merril Bainbridge

Other hits
Songs which peaked at number two were "Pure Massacre" by Silverchair, "Here Comes the Hotstepper" by Ini Kamoze, "Total Eclipse of the Heart" by Nicki French, "Think Twice" by Celine Dion, "Scream" by Michael Jackson and Janet Jackson, "Excalibur" by F.C.B., "Alice, Who the Fuck Is Alice?" by The Steppers, "Where the Wild Roses Grow" by Nick Cave and the Bad Seeds and Kylie Minogue, "Let's Groove" by CDB, and Merkin Ball ("I Got Id") by Pearl Jam.

Songs which peaked at number three were "Stay Another Day" by East 17, "Sukiyaki" by 4 P.M., "Strong Enough" by Sheryl Crow, and "Shy Guy" by Diana King.

Other major hits (with peak positions noted) included "Waterfalls" (4) by TLC, "You Oughta Know" (4) by Alanis Morissette, "Short Dick Man" (4) by 20 Fingers featuring Gillette, "This Ain't a Love Song" (4) by Bon Jovi, "Under the Water" (4) by Merril Bainbridge, "It's Alright" (4) by Deni Hines, "Somebody's Crying" (5) by Chris Isaak, "Don't Stop (Wiggle Wiggle)" (5) by The Outhere Brothers, "Ode to My Family" (5) by The Cranberries, "Bedtime Story" (5) by Madonna, "Self Esteem" (6) by The Offspring, "A Girl Like You" (6) by Edwyn Collins, "You Are Not Alone" (7) by Michael Jackson, "When I Come Around" (7) by Green Day, "As I Lay Me Down" (7) by Sophie B. Hawkins, "Runaway" (8) by Janet Jackson, "Cotton Eye Joe" (8) by Rednex, "Baby Did a Bad, Bad Thing" (9) by Chris Isaak and "You'll See" (9) by Madonna.

Hits by Australasian artists also included "Sorrento Moon (I Remember)" (7) by Tina Arena and "Put Yourself in My Place" (11) by Kylie Minogue.

== 1996 ==
Date	Artist	Single	Weeks at number one
6 January	Coolio featuring L.V.	"Gangsta's Paradise"	13 weeks
13 January	Coolio featuring L.V.	"Gangsta's Paradise"	13 weeks
20 January	George Michael	"Jesus to a Child"	2 weeks
27 January	George Michael	"Jesus to a Child"	2 weeks
3 February	Shaggy	"Boombastic"	4 weeks
10 February	Oasis	"Wonderwall"	1 week
17 February	Shaggy	"Boombastic"	4 weeks
24 February	Shaggy	"Boombastic"	4 weeks
2 March	Shaggy	"Boombastic"	4 weeks
9 March	Joan Osborne	"One of Us"	5 weeks
16 March	Joan Osborne	"One of Us"	5 weeks
23 March	Joan Osborne	"One of Us"	5 weeks
30 March	Joan Osborne	"One of Us"	5 weeks
6 April	Joan Osborne	"One of Us"	5 weeks
13 April	OMC	"How Bizarre"	5 weeks
20 April	OMC	"How Bizarre"	5 weeks
27 April	OMC	"How Bizarre"	5 weeks
4 May	OMC	"How Bizarre"	5 weeks
11 May	OMC	"How Bizarre"	5 weeks
18 May	George Michael	"Fastlove"	4 weeks
25 May	George Michael	"Fastlove"	4 weeks
1 June	Metallica	"Until It Sleeps"	1 week
8 June	George Michael	"Fastlove"	4 weeks
15 June	George Michael	"Fastlove"	4 weeks
22 June	Fugees	"Killing Me Softly"	7 weeks
29 June	Fugees	"Killing Me Softly"	7 weeks
6 July	Fugees	"Killing Me Softly"	7 weeks
13 July	Fugees	"Killing Me Softly"	7 weeks
20 July	Fugees	"Killing Me Softly"	7 weeks
27 July	Fugees	"Killing Me Softly"	7 weeks
3 August	Fugees	"Killing Me Softly"	7 weeks
10 August	Celine Dion	"Because You Loved Me"	3 weeks
17 August	Celine Dion	"Because You Loved Me"	3 weeks
24 August	Celine Dion	"Because You Loved Me"	3 weeks
31 August	Los del Río	"Macarena"	9 weeks
7 September	Los del Río	"Macarena"	9 weeks
14 September	Los del Río	"Macarena"	9 weeks
21 September	Los del Río	"Macarena"	9 weeks
28 September	Los del Río	"Macarena"	9 weeks
5 October	Los del Río	"Macarena"	9 weeks
12 October	Los del Río	"Macarena"	9 weeks
19 October	Los del Río	"Macarena"	9 weeks
26 October	Los del Río	"Macarena"	9 weeks
2 November	Spice Girls	"Wannabe"	11 weeks
9 November	Spice Girls	"Wannabe"	11 weeks
16 November	Spice Girls	"Wannabe"	11 weeks
23 November	Spice Girls	"Wannabe"	11 weeks
30 November	Spice Girls	"Wannabe"	11 weeks
7 December	Spice Girls	"Wannabe"	11 weeks
14 December	Spice Girls	"Wannabe"	11 weeks
21 December	Spice Girls	"Wannabe"	11 weeks
28 December	Spice Girls	"Wannabe"	11 weeks

Top 5 singles by Australian and New Zealand artists

1. "How Bizarre" – OMC
2. "I Want You" – Savage Garden
3. "Ooh Aah... Just a Little Bit" – Gina G
4. "Get Down on It" – Peter Andre featuring Past to Present
5. "Apple Eyes" – Swoop

Other hits
Songs which peaked at number two were "Boom Boom Boom" by The Outhere Brothers, "One Sweet Day" by Mariah Carey and Boyz II Men, "Be My Lover" by La Bouche, "Missing" by Everything but the Girl, "Father and Son" by Boyzone, "X-Files Theme" by Triple X, "Nobody Knows" by The Tony Rich Project, "Theme from Mission: Impossible" by Adam Clayton and Larry Mullen, "Return of the Mack" by Mark Morrison, "Macarena" by Los del Mar, "Hero of the Day" by Metallica, "You're Makin' Me High" by Toni Braxton, "I Love You Always Forever" by Donna Lewis, "What's Love Got to Do with It" by Warren G featuring Adina Howard, and "Where Do You Go" by No Mercy.

Songs which peaked at number three were "Give Me One Reason" by Tracy Chapman, "Breakfast at Tiffany's" by Deep Blue Something, "Have a Little Faith" by John Farnham, "Spaceman" by Babylon Zoo, "Ironic" by Alanis Morissette, "Just a Girl" by No Doubt, and "I'll Be There for You" by The Rembrandts.

Other major hits (with peak positions noted) included "I Want You" (4) by Savage Garden, "California Love" (4) by 2Pac featuring Dr. Dre and Roger Troutman, "Sometimes When We Touch" (5) by Newton, "Ooh Aah... Just a Little Bit" (5) by Gina G, "Children" (5) by Robert Miles, "Mother Mother" (5) by Tracy Bonham, "Glycerine" (5) by Bush, "It's Oh So Quiet" (6) by Björk, "Diggin' on You" (6) by TLC, "That Girl" (7) by Maxi Priest with Shaggy, "Let's Make a Night to Remember" (7) by Bryan Adams, "Blue" (10) by LeAnn Rimes and "Lump" (11) by The Presidents of the United States of America.

Hits by Australasian artists also included "Get Down on It" (5) by Peter Andre, "Apple Eyes" (9) by Swoop, "Lover Lover" (6) by Jimmy Barnes, "Have a Little Faith (In Us)" (3) by John Farnham, and "Wishes" (6) by Human Nature.

== 1997 ==
Date	Artist	Single	Weeks at number one
5 January	Spice Girls	"Wannabe"	11 weeks
12 January	Spice Girls	"Wannabe"	11 weeks
19 January	Savage Garden	"To the Moon and Back"	1 week
26 January	Silverchair	"Freak"	2 weeks
2 February	Silverchair	"Freak"	2 weeks
9 February	No Doubt	"Don't Speak"	8 weeks
16 February	No Doubt	"Don't Speak"	8 weeks
23 February	No Doubt	"Don't Speak"	8 weeks
2 March	No Doubt	"Don't Speak"	8 weeks
9 March	No Doubt	"Don't Speak"	8 weeks
16 March	No Doubt	"Don't Speak"	8 weeks
23 March	No Doubt	"Don't Speak"	8 weeks
30 March	No Doubt	"Don't Speak"	8 weeks
6 April	Savage Garden	"Truly Madly Deeply"	8 weeks
13 April	Savage Garden	"Truly Madly Deeply"	8 weeks
20 April	Savage Garden	"Truly Madly Deeply"	8 weeks
27 April	Savage Garden	"Truly Madly Deeply"	8 weeks
4 May	Savage Garden	"Truly Madly Deeply"	8 weeks
11 May	Savage Garden	"Truly Madly Deeply"	8 weeks
18 May	Savage Garden	"Truly Madly Deeply"	8 weeks
25 May	Savage Garden	"Truly Madly Deeply"	8 weeks
1 June	Hanson	"MMMBop"	9 weeks
8 June	Hanson	"MMMBop"	9 weeks
15 June	Hanson	"MMMBop"	9 weeks
22 June	Hanson	"MMMBop"	9 weeks
29 June	Hanson	"MMMBop"	9 weeks
6 July	Hanson	"MMMBop"	9 weeks
13 July	Hanson	"MMMBop"	9 weeks
20 July	Hanson	"MMMBop"	9 weeks
27 July	Hanson	"MMMBop"	9 weeks
3 August	Puff Daddy and Faith Evans featuring 112	"I'll Be Missing You"	5 weeks
10 August	Puff Daddy and Faith Evans featuring 112	"I'll Be Missing You"	5 weeks
17 August	Puff Daddy and Faith Evans featuring 112	"I'll Be Missing You"	5 weeks
24 August	Puff Daddy and Faith Evans featuring 112	"I'll Be Missing You"	5 weeks
31 August	Puff Daddy and Faith Evans featuring 112	"I'll Be Missing You"	5 weeks
7 September	Will Smith	"Men in Black"	4 weeks
14 September	Will Smith	"Men in Black"	4 weeks
21 September	Will Smith	"Men in Black"	4 weeks
28 September	Will Smith	"Men in Black"	4 weeks
5 October	Elton John	"Something About the Way You Look Tonight"/ "Candle in the Wind 1997"	6 weeks
12 October	Elton John	"Something About the Way You Look Tonight"/ "Candle in the Wind 1997"	6 weeks
19 October	Elton John	"Something About the Way You Look Tonight"/ "Candle in the Wind 1997"	6 weeks
26 October	Elton John	"Something About the Way You Look Tonight"/ "Candle in the Wind 1997"	6 weeks
2 November	Elton John	"Something About the Way You Look Tonight"/ "Candle in the Wind 1997"	6 weeks
9 November	Elton John	"Something About the Way You Look Tonight"/ "Candle in the Wind 1997"	6 weeks
16 November	Aqua	"Barbie Girl"	3 weeks
23 November	Aqua	"Barbie Girl"	3 weeks
30 November	Aqua	"Barbie Girl"	3 weeks
7 December	Chumbawamba	"Tubthumping"	3 weeks
14 December	Chumbawamba	"Tubthumping"	3 weeks
21 December	Chumbawamba	"Tubthumping"	3 weeks
28 December	Aqua	"Doctor Jones"	7 weeks

Top 5 singles by Australian and New Zealand artists

1. "Truly Madly Deeply" – Savage Garden
2. "To the Moon and Back" – Savage Garden
3. "Freak" – Silverchair
4. "Every Time You Cry" – John Farnham and Human Nature
5. "Burn" – Tina Arena

Other hits
Songs which peaked at number two were "Break My Stride" by Unique II, "I Finally Found Someone" by Barbra Streisand and Bryan Adams, "Breathe" by The Prodigy, "Last Night" by Az Yet, "2 Become 1" by Spice Girls, "Your Woman" by White Town, "When I Die" by No Mercy, "Burn" by Tina Arena, "Bitch" by Meredith Brooks, and "Where's the Love" and "I Will Come to You" by Hanson.

Songs which peaked at number three were "Discothèque" by U2, "Pony" by Ginuwine, "Don't Let Go (Love)" by En Vogue, "One More Time" by Real McCoy, "You Were Meant for Me" by Jewel, "When Doves Cry" by Quindon Tarver, "How Do I Live" by Trisha Yearwood, "Every Time You Cry" by John Farnham and Human Nature, "Do Ya Think I'm Sexy?" by N-Trance, and "Everybody (Backstreet's Back)" by Backstreet Boys.

Other major hits (with peak positions noted) included "Even When I'm Sleeping" (4) by Leonardo's Bride, "Everybody (Backstreet's Back)" (4) by Backstreet Boys, "Song 2" (4) by Blur, "How Come, How Long" (5) by Babyface featuring Stevie Wonder, "Blood on the Dance Floor" (5) by Michael Jackson, "Sexy Eyes" (6) by Whigfield, "Alone" (6) by the Bee Gees, "Don't Cry for Me Argentina" (7) by Madonna, "Honey" (8) by Mariah Carey, "Semi-Charmed Life" (8) by Third Eye Blind, "Got 'til It's Gone" (10) by Janet Jackson featuring Q-Tip and Joni Mitchell, "The End Is the Beginning Is the End" (10) by The Smashing Pumpkins, "Mo Money Mo Problems" (10) by The Notorious B.I.G. featuring Puff Daddy and Mase and "Lovefool" (11) by The Cardigans.

Hits by Australasian artists also included "Break Me Shake Me" (7) by Savage Garden, "Don't Say Goodbye" (8) by Human Nature, "Abuse Me" (9) and "Cemetery" (5) by Silverchair, "Calypso" (13) by Spiderbait, "All I Wanna Do" (11) by Dannii Minogue and "Did It Again" (15) by Kylie Minogue.

== 1998 ==
Date	Artist	Single	Weeks at number one
4 January	Aqua	"Doctor Jones"	7 weeks
11 January	Aqua	"Doctor Jones"	7 weeks
18 January	Aqua	"Doctor Jones"	7 weeks
25 January	Aqua	"Doctor Jones"	7 weeks
1 February	Aqua	"Doctor Jones"	7 weeks
8 February	Aqua	"Doctor Jones"	7 weeks
15 February	Celine Dion	"My Heart Will Go On"	4 weeks
22 February	Celine Dion	"My Heart Will Go On"	4 weeks
1 March	Celine Dion	"My Heart Will Go On"	4 weeks
8 March	Celine Dion	"My Heart Will Go On"	4 weeks
15 March	Run–D.M.C. vs. Jason Nevins	"It's Like That"	1 week
22 March	All Saints	"Never Ever"	7 weeks
29 March	All Saints	"Never Ever"	7 weeks
5 April	All Saints	"Never Ever"	7 weeks
12 April	All Saints	"Never Ever"	7 weeks
19 April	All Saints	"Never Ever"	7 weeks
26 April	All Saints	"Never Ever"	7 weeks
3 May	All Saints	"Never Ever"	7 weeks
10 May	Shania Twain	"You're Still the One"	4 weeks
17 May	Shania Twain	"You're Still the One"	4 weeks
24 May	Shania Twain	"You're Still the One"	4 weeks
31 May	Shania Twain	"You're Still the One"	4 weeks
7 June	Steps	"5,6,7,8"	1 week
14 June	K-Ci & JoJo	"All My Life"	1 week
21 June	Ricky Martin	"The Cup of Life"/"María"	6 weeks
28 June	Ricky Martin	"The Cup of Life"/"María"	6 weeks
5 July	Ricky Martin	"The Cup of Life"/"María"	6 weeks
12 July	Ricky Martin	"The Cup of Life"/"María"	6 weeks
19 July	Ricky Martin	"The Cup of Life"/"María"	6 weeks
26 July	Ricky Martin	"The Cup of Life"/"María"	6 weeks
2 August	Goo Goo Dolls	"Iris"	5 weeks
9 August	Goo Goo Dolls	"Iris"	5 weeks
16 August	Goo Goo Dolls	"Iris"	5 weeks
23 August	Goo Goo Dolls	"Iris"	5 weeks
30 August	Goo Goo Dolls	"Iris"	5 weeks
6 September	Lighthouse Family	"High"	1 week
13 September	Aerosmith	"I Don't Want to Miss a Thing"	9 weeks
20 September	Aerosmith	"I Don't Want to Miss a Thing"	9 weeks
27 September	Aerosmith	"I Don't Want to Miss a Thing"	9 weeks
4 October	Aerosmith	"I Don't Want to Miss a Thing"	9 weeks
11 October	Aerosmith	"I Don't Want to Miss a Thing"	9 weeks
18 October	Aerosmith	"I Don't Want to Miss a Thing"	9 weeks
25 October	Aerosmith	"I Don't Want to Miss a Thing"	9 weeks
1 November	Aerosmith	"I Don't Want to Miss a Thing"	9 weeks
8 November	Aerosmith	"I Don't Want to Miss a Thing"	9 weeks
15 November	B*Witched	"Rollercoaster"	2 weeks
22 November	B*Witched	"Rollercoaster"	2 weeks
29 November	Jennifer Paige	"Crush"	2 weeks
6 December	Jennifer Paige	"Crush"	2 weeks
13 December	The Offspring	"Pretty Fly (for a White Guy)"	6 weeks
20 December	The Offspring	"Pretty Fly (for a White Guy)"	6 weeks
27 December	The Offspring	"Pretty Fly (for a White Guy)"	6 weeks

Top 5 singles by Australian and New Zealand artists

1. "Second Solution"/"Prisoner of Society" – The Living End
2. "Buses and Trains" – Bachelor Girl
3. "Torn" – Natalie Imbruglia
4. "Big Mistake" – Natalie Imbruglia
5. "Sway" – Bic Runga

Other hits
Songs which peaked at number two were "As Long as You Love Me" by Backstreet Boys, "Torn" by Natalie Imbruglia, "Fuel" by Metallica, "Ghetto Supastar (That Is What You Are)" by Pras Michel featuring Ol' Dirty Bastard and introducing Mýa, "When the Lights Go Out" by Five, "Viva Forever" by Spice Girls, "Good Riddance (Time of Your Life)"/"Redundant" by Green Day, and "From This Moment On" by Shania Twain.

Songs which peaked at number three were "Lollipop (Candyman)" by Aqua, "The Boy Is Mine" by Brandy and Monica, "If You Could Read My Mind" by Stars on 54, and "Finally Found" by Honeyz.

Other major hits (with peak positions noted) included "Second Solution"/"Prisoner of Society" (4) by The Living End, "Together Again" (4) by Janet Jackson, "All I Have to Give" (4) by Backstreet Boys, "Music Sounds Better with You" (4) by Stardust, "Buses and Trains" (4) by Bachelor Girl, "Last Thing on My Mind" (5) by Steps, "Stop" (5) by Spice Girls, "Frozen" (5) by Madonna, "Under the Bridge"/"Lady Marmalade" (5) by All Saints, "Ray of Light" (6) by Madonna, "You Make Me Wanna..." (6) by Usher, "Everybody Get Up" (6) by Five, "Gettin' Jiggy wit It" (6) by Will Smith, "Big Mistake" (6) by Natalie Imbruglia, "This Is How We Party" (7) by S.O.A.P., "Walkin' on the Sun" (7) by Smash Mouth, "Life" (8) by Des'ree, "Crush on You" (9) by Aaron Carter and "I'll Never Break Your Heart" (10) by the Backstreet Boys.

Hits by Australasian artists also included "Pash" (10) by Kate Ceberano, "Polyester Girl" (14) by Regurgitator, "Cruel" (14) by Human Nature, "The Things I Love in You" (10) by Cold Chisel, Pushing Buttons (EP) (13) by Grinspoon, "I Don't Like It" (10) by Pauline Pantsdown, "Now I Can Dance" (13) by Tina Arena, "Cry" (13) by The Mavis's and "Addicted to Bass" (15) by Josh Abrahams and Amiel Daemion.

== 1999 ==
Date	Artist	Single	Weeks at number one
3 January	The Offspring	"Pretty Fly (for a White Guy)"	6 weeks
10 January	The Offspring	"Pretty Fly (for a White Guy)"	6 weeks
17 January	The Offspring	"Pretty Fly (for a White Guy)"	6 weeks
24 January	Cher	"Believe"	5 weeks
31 January	Cher	"Believe"	5 weeks
7 February	Cher	"Believe"	5 weeks
14 February	Cher	"Believe"	5 weeks
21 February	Cher	"Believe"	5 weeks
28 February	Britney Spears	"...Baby One More Time"	9 weeks
7 March	Britney Spears	"...Baby One More Time"	9 weeks
14 March	Britney Spears	"...Baby One More Time"	9 weeks
21 March	Britney Spears	"...Baby One More Time"	9 weeks
28 March	Britney Spears	"...Baby One More Time"	9 weeks
4 April	Britney Spears	"...Baby One More Time"	9 weeks
11 April	Britney Spears	"...Baby One More Time"	9 weeks
18 April	Britney Spears	"...Baby One More Time"	9 weeks
25 April	Britney Spears	"...Baby One More Time"	9 weeks
2 May	TLC	"No Scrubs"	7 weeks
9 May	TLC	"No Scrubs"	7 weeks
16 May	TLC	"No Scrubs"	7 weeks
23 May	TLC	"No Scrubs"	7 weeks
30 May	TLC	"No Scrubs"	7 weeks
6 June	TLC	"No Scrubs"	7 weeks
13 June	TLC	"No Scrubs"	7 weeks
20 June	Sixpence None the Richer	"Kiss Me"	3 weeks
27 June	Sixpence None the Richer	"Kiss Me"	3 weeks
4 July	Sixpence None the Richer	"Kiss Me"	3 weeks
11 July	Jennifer Lopez	"If You Had My Love"	3 weeks
18 July	Jennifer Lopez	"If You Had My Love"	3 weeks
25 July	Jennifer Lopez	"If You Had My Love"	3 weeks
1 August	Pearl Jam	"Last Kiss"	7 weeks
8 August	Pearl Jam	"Last Kiss"	7 weeks
15 August	Pearl Jam	"Last Kiss"	7 weeks
22 August	Pearl Jam	"Last Kiss"	7 weeks
29 August	Pearl Jam	"Last Kiss"	7 weeks
5 September	Pearl Jam	"Last Kiss"	7 weeks
12 September	Pearl Jam	"Last Kiss"	7 weeks
19 September	Lou Bega	"Mambo No. 5 (A Little Bit Of...)"	8 weeks
26 September	Lou Bega	"Mambo No. 5 (A Little Bit Of...)"	8 weeks
3 October	Lou Bega	"Mambo No. 5 (A Little Bit Of...)"	8 weeks
10 October	Lou Bega	"Mambo No. 5 (A Little Bit Of...)"	8 weeks
17 October	Lou Bega	"Mambo No. 5 (A Little Bit Of...)"	8 weeks
24 October	Lou Bega	"Mambo No. 5 (A Little Bit Of...)"	8 weeks
31 October	Lou Bega	"Mambo No. 5 (A Little Bit Of...)"	8 weeks
7 November	Lou Bega	"Mambo No. 5 (A Little Bit Of...)"	8 weeks
14 November	Eiffel 65	"Blue (Da Ba Dee)"	9 weeks
21 November	Eiffel 65	"Blue (Da Ba Dee)"	9 weeks
28 November	Eiffel 65	"Blue (Da Ba Dee)"	9 weeks
5 December	Eiffel 65	"Blue (Da Ba Dee)"	9 weeks
12 December	Eiffel 65	"Blue (Da Ba Dee)"	9 weeks
19 December	Eiffel 65	"Blue (Da Ba Dee)"	9 weeks
26 December	Eiffel 65	"Blue (Da Ba Dee)"	9 weeks

Top 5 singles by Australian and New Zealand artists

1. "Don't Call Me Baby" – Madison Avenue
2. "The Animal Song" – Savage Garden
3. "I Knew I Loved You" – Savage Garden
4. "Absolutely Everybody" – Vanessa Amorosi
5. "Jackie" – B.Z. featuring Joanne

Other hits
Songs which peaked at number two were "That Don't Impress Me Much" by Shania Twain, "Why Don't You Get a Job?" by The Offspring, "We Like to Party" and "Boom, Boom, Boom, Boom!!" by Vengaboys, "I Want It That Way" by Backstreet Boys, "Sometimes" by Britney Spears, "If Ya Gettin' Down" by Five, "Genie in a Bottle" by Christina Aguilera, "Don't Call Me Baby" by Madison Avenue, and "The Millennium Prayer" by Cliff Richard.

Songs which peaked at number three were "Goodbye" by Spice Girls, "Jackie" by B.Z. featuring Joanne, "Anthem for the Year 2000" by Silverchair, "The Animal Song" by Savage Garden, "Look at Me" by Geri Halliwell, "Larger than Life" by Backstreet Boys, "When You Say Nothing at All" by Ronan Keating, "Unpretty" by TLC, "Bring It All Back" by S Club 7, and "Sister" by Sister 2 Sister.

Other major hits (with peak positions noted) included "When You're Gone" (4) by Bryan Adams and Melanie C, "I Knew I Loved You" (4) by Savage Garden, "Livin' la Vida Loca" (4) by Ricky Martin, "2 Times" (4) by Ann Lee, "This Kiss" (4) by Faith Hill, "All Star" (4) by Smash Mouth, "Touch It" (5) by Monifah, "No Matter What" (5) by Boyzone, "Absolutely Everybody" (5) by Vanessa Amorosi, "Lullaby" (5) by Shawn Mullins, "Beautiful Stranger" (5) by Madonna, "Sweet Like Chocolate" (6) by Shanks & Bigfoot, "Honey to the Bee" (6) by Billie Piper, "Silence" (6) by Delerium featuring Sarah McLachlan, "(7) "Changes" by 2Pac, "Got the Feelin'" (6) and Until the Time Is Through" (8) by Five, "Doo Wop (That Thing)" (8) by Lauryn Hill, "Wild Wild West" (8) by Will Smith featuring Dru Hill and Kool Moe Dee, "Fly Away" (8) by Lenny Kravitz, "Thank ABBA for the Music" (9) by B*Witched, Steps, Cleopatra, Tina Cousins and Billie Piper and "Heartbreaker" (10) by Mariah Carey featuring Jay-Z.

Hits by Australasian artists also included "Sister" (3) by Sister2Sister, "Weir" (6) by Killing Heidi, "Eternal Flame"/"Shake You Outta My Head" (8), "Don't Cry" (5) and "Last to Know" (14) by Human Nature, "Have a Look" (13) by Vanessa Amorosi and "Everywhere You Go" (15) by Taxiride.

== See also ==
- Music of Australia
- List of UK Singles Chart number ones of the 1990s
- List of Billboard number-one singles
- List of number-one singles from the 1990s (New Zealand)
- List of artists who reached number one on the Australian singles chart
