= List of number-one albums in Australia during the 1990s =

Australian number-one albums of the 1990s < 1980s 2000 >

Triple J Hottest 100
- 1990 1991 1993 1994; 1995 1996 1997 1998 1999

Australian top 25 singles
- 1990 1991 1992 1993 1994; 1995 1996 1997 1998 1999

Australian top 25 albums
- 1990 1991 1992 1993 1994; 1995 1996 1997 1998 1999

The following lists the number-one albums on the Australian Albums Chart, during the 1990s. The source for this decade is the ARIA Charts.

Key
The yellow background indicates the #1 album on the ARIA End of Year Chart
The light blue background indicates the #1 album on the ARIA End of Decade Chart

== 1990 ==
Date	Artist	Album	Weeks at number one
7 January	Jive Bunny and the Mastermixers	Jive Bunny: The Album	2 weeks
14 January	Jive Bunny and the Mastermixers	Jive Bunny: The Album	2 weeks
21 January	The B-52's	Cosmic Thing	3 weeks
28 January	The B-52's	Cosmic Thing	3 weeks
4 February	The B-52's	Cosmic Thing	3 weeks
11 February	Aerosmith	Pump	3 weeks
18 February	Aerosmith	Pump	3 weeks
25 February	Aerosmith	Pump	3 weeks
4 March	The 12th Man	The 12th Man Again!	1 week
11 March	Midnight Oil	Blue Sky Mining	2 weeks
18 March	Midnight Oil	Blue Sky Mining	2 weeks
25 March	Sinéad O'Connor	I Do Not Want What I Haven't Got	1 week
1 April	Milli Vanilli	All or Nothing	5 weeks
8 April	Milli Vanilli	All or Nothing	5 weeks
15 April	Milli Vanilli	All or Nothing	5 weeks
22 April	Milli Vanilli	All or Nothing	5 weeks
29 April	Milli Vanilli	All or Nothing	5 weeks
6 May	Michael Bolton	Soul Provider	3 weeks
13 May	Paula Abdul	Forever Your Girl	1 week
20 May	Michael Bolton	Soul Provider	3 weeks
27 May	Michael Bolton	Soul Provider	3 weeks
3 June	Madonna	I'm Breathless: Music from and Inspired by the Film Dick Tracy	3 weeks
10 June	Madonna	I'm Breathless: Music from and Inspired by the Film Dick Tracy	3 weeks
17 June	Madonna	I'm Breathless: Music from and Inspired by the Film Dick Tracy	3 weeks
24 June	The Angels	Beyond Salvation	2 weeks
1 July	The Angels	Beyond Salvation	2 weeks
8 July	Various artists	Pretty Woman Soundtrack	4 weeks
15 July	Various artists	Pretty Woman Soundtrack	4 weeks
22 July	Various artists	Pretty Woman Soundtrack	4 weeks
29 July	Various artists	Pretty Woman Soundtrack	4 weeks
5 August	Gloria Estefan	Cuts Both Ways	2 weeks
12 August	Gloria Estefan	Cuts Both Ways	2 weeks
19 August	Van Morrison	The Best of Van Morrison	3 weeks
26 August	Van Morrison	The Best of Van Morrison	3 weeks
2 September	Van Morrison	The Best of Van Morrison	3 weeks
9 September	Jimmy Barnes	Two Fires	4 weeks
16 September	Jimmy Barnes	Two Fires	4 weeks
23 September	Jimmy Barnes	Two Fires	4 weeks
30 September	Jimmy Barnes	Two Fires	4 weeks
7 October	John Farnham	Chain Reaction	5 weeks
14 October	John Farnham	Chain Reaction	5 weeks
21 October	INXS	X	2 weeks
28 October	INXS	X	2 weeks
4 November	John Farnham	Chain Reaction	5 weeks
11 November	John Farnham	Chain Reaction	5 weeks
18 November	John Farnham	Chain Reaction	5 weeks
25 November	The Three Tenors	The Three Tenors in Concert	4 weeks
2 December	Madonna	The Immaculate Collection	5 weeks
9 December	Madonna	The Immaculate Collection	5 weeks
16 December	Madonna	The Immaculate Collection	5 weeks
23 December	The Three Tenors	The Three Tenors in Concert	4 weeks
30 December	The Three Tenors	The Three Tenors in Concert	4 weeks

== 1991 ==
Date	Artist	Album	Weeks at number one
6 January	The Three Tenors	The Three Tenors in Concert	4 weeks
13 January	Madonna	The Immaculate Collection	5 weeks
20 January	Madonna	The Immaculate Collection	5 weeks
27 January	Elton John	The Very Best of Elton John	1 week
3 February	Janet Jackson	Janet Jackson's Rhythm Nation 1814	4 weeks
10 February	Billy Joel	Souvenir: The Ultimate Collection	1 week
17 February	Janet Jackson	Janet Jackson's Rhythm Nation 1814	4 weeks
24 February	Janet Jackson	Janet Jackson's Rhythm Nation 1814	4 weeks
3 March	Janet Jackson	Janet Jackson's Rhythm Nation 1814	4 weeks
10 March	Hothouse Flowers	Home	1 week
17 March	Black Box	Dreamland	3 weeks
24 March	Black Box	Dreamland	3 weeks
31 March	Black Box	Dreamland	3 weeks
7 April	Angelo Badalamenti	Soundtrack from Twin Peaks	1 week
14 April	Eurythmics	Greatest Hits	7 weeks
21 April	Eurythmics	Greatest Hits	7 weeks
28 April	Eurythmics	Greatest Hits	7 weeks
5 May	Eurythmics	Greatest Hits	7 weeks
12 May	Eurythmics	Greatest Hits	7 weeks
19 May	Eurythmics	Greatest Hits	7 weeks
26 May	Eurythmics	Greatest Hits	7 weeks
2 June	Ratcat	Blind Love	3 weeks
9 June	Ratcat	Blind Love	3 weeks
16 June	Jimmy Barnes	Two Fires	1 week
23 June	Ratcat	Blind Love	3 weeks
30 June	Various artists	Grease: The Original Soundtrack from the Motion Picture	13 weeks^{1}
7 July	Various artists	Grease: The Original Soundtrack from the Motion Picture	13 weeks^{1}
14 July	Various artists	Grease: The Original Soundtrack from the Motion Picture	13 weeks^{1}
21 July	Noiseworks	Love Versus Money	1 week
28 July	Rod Stewart	Vagabond Heart	1 week
4 August	Natalie Cole	Unforgettable... with Love	6 weeks
11 August	Natalie Cole	Unforgettable... with Love	6 weeks
18 August	Natalie Cole	Unforgettable... with Love	6 weeks
25 August	Metallica	Metallica	1 week
1 September	Natalie Cole	Unforgettable... with Love	6 weeks
8 September	Natalie Cole	Unforgettable... with Love	6 weeks
15 September	Natalie Cole	Unforgettable... with Love	6 weeks
22 September	Dire Straits	On Every Street	1 week
29 September	Guns N' Roses	Use Your Illusion II	3 weeks
6 October	Guns N' Roses	Use Your Illusion II	3 weeks
13 October	Guns N' Roses	Use Your Illusion II	3 weeks
20 October	Bryan Adams	Waking Up the Neighbours	4 weeks
27 October	Bryan Adams	Waking Up the Neighbours	4 weeks
3 November	Bryan Adams	Waking Up the Neighbours	4 weeks
10 November	Bryan Adams	Waking Up the Neighbours	4 weeks
17 November	Jimmy Barnes	Soul Deep	3 weeks
24 November	Jimmy Barnes	Soul Deep	3 weeks
1 December	U2	Achtung Baby	1 week
8 December	Michael Jackson	Dangerous	6 weeks
15 December	Michael Jackson	Dangerous	6 weeks
22 December	Michael Jackson	Dangerous	6 weeks
29 December	Michael Jackson	Dangerous	6 weeks

- ^{1} The Grease soundtrack spent nine of its weeks at number one in 1978, and four in the 1990s—three in 1991 and one in 1998.

== 1992 ==
Date	Artist	Album	Weeks at number one
5 January	Michael Jackson	Dangerous	6 weeks
12 January	Michael Jackson	Dangerous	6 weeks
19 January	Jimmy Barnes	Soul Deep	3 weeks
26 January	Prince and The New Power Generation	Diamonds and Pearls	1 week
2 February	Baby Animals	Baby Animals	6 weeks
9 February	Baby Animals	Baby Animals	6 weeks
16 February	Baby Animals	Baby Animals	6 weeks
23 February	Baby Animals	Baby Animals	6 weeks
1 March	Baby Animals	Baby Animals	6 weeks
8 March	Baby Animals	Baby Animals	6 weeks
15 March	Diesel	Hepfidelity	4 weeks
22 March	Diesel	Hepfidelity	4 weeks
29 March	Diesel	Hepfidelity	4 weeks
5 April	Diesel	Hepfidelity	4 weeks
12 April	Def Leppard	Adrenalize	2 weeks
19 April	Def Leppard	Adrenalize	2 weeks
26 April	Red Hot Chili Peppers	Blood Sugar Sex Magik	2 weeks
3 May	Red Hot Chili Peppers	Blood Sugar Sex Magik	2 weeks
10 May	The Cure	Wish	1 week
17 May	Neil Diamond	The Greatest Hits: 1966–1992	2 weeks
24 May	Neil Diamond	The Greatest Hits: 1966–1992	2 weeks
31 May	Michael Crawford	Michael Crawford Performs Andrew Lloyd Webber	3 weeks
7 June	Michael Crawford	Michael Crawford Performs Andrew Lloyd Webber	3 weeks
14 June	Michael Crawford	Michael Crawford Performs Andrew Lloyd Webber	3 weeks
21 June	Lionel Richie	Back to Front	6 weeks
28 June	Lionel Richie	Back to Front	6 weeks
5 July	Lionel Richie	Back to Front	6 weeks
12 July	Lionel Richie	Back to Front	6 weeks
19 July	Lionel Richie	Back to Front	6 weeks
26 July	Lionel Richie	Back to Front	6 weeks
2 August	1992 Australian Cast	Jesus Christ Superstar	10 weeks
9 August	1992 Australian Cast	Jesus Christ Superstar	10 weeks
16 August	1992 Australian Cast	Jesus Christ Superstar	10 weeks
23 August	1992 Australian Cast	Jesus Christ Superstar	10 weeks
30 August	1992 Australian Cast	Jesus Christ Superstar	10 weeks
6 September	1992 Australian Cast	Jesus Christ Superstar	10 weeks
13 September	1992 Australian Cast	Jesus Christ Superstar	10 weeks
20 September	1992 Australian Cast	Jesus Christ Superstar	10 weeks
27 September	1992 Australian Cast	Jesus Christ Superstar	10 weeks
4 October	1992 Australian Cast	Jesus Christ Superstar	10 weeks
11 October	Billy Ray Cyrus	Some Gave All	2 weeks
18 October	Billy Ray Cyrus	Some Gave All	2 weeks
25 October	Prince and The New Power Generation	Love Symbol Album	1 week
1 November	Madonna	Erotica	2 weeks
8 November	Madonna	Erotica	2 weeks
15 November	Bon Jovi	Keep the Faith	1 week
22 November	AC/DC	AC/DC Live	2 weeks
29 November	AC/DC	AC/DC Live	2 weeks
6 December	Simple Minds	Glittering Prize 81/92	1 week
13 December	ABBA	Gold: Greatest Hits	4 weeks
20 December	ABBA	Gold: Greatest Hits	4 weeks
27 December	ABBA	Gold: Greatest Hits	4 weeks

== 1993 ==
Date	Artist	Album	Weeks at number one
3 January	ABBA	Gold: Greatest Hits	4 weeks
10 January	The 12th Man	Still the 12th Man	3 weeks
17 January	The 12th Man	Still the 12th Man	3 weeks
24 January	The 12th Man	Still the 12th Man	3 weeks
31 January	Whitney Houston and various artists	The Bodyguard: Original Soundtrack Album	5 weeks
7 February	Whitney Houston and various artists	The Bodyguard: Original Soundtrack Album	5 weeks
14 February	Whitney Houston and various artists	The Bodyguard: Original Soundtrack Album	5 weeks
21 February	Whitney Houston and various artists	The Bodyguard: Original Soundtrack Album	5 weeks
28 February	Whitney Houston and various artists	The Bodyguard: Original Soundtrack Album	5 weeks
7 March	Eric Clapton	Unplugged	8 weeks
14 March	Eric Clapton	Unplugged	8 weeks
21 March	Eric Clapton	Unplugged	8 weeks
28 March	Eric Clapton	Unplugged	8 weeks
4 April	Eric Clapton	Unplugged	8 weeks
11 April	Eric Clapton	Unplugged	8 weeks
18 April	Lenny Kravitz	Are You Gonna Go My Way	4 weeks
25 April	Lenny Kravitz	Are You Gonna Go My Way	4 weeks
2 May	Lenny Kravitz	Are You Gonna Go My Way	4 weeks
9 May	Lenny Kravitz	Are You Gonna Go My Way	4 weeks
16 May	Kenny G	Breathless	1 week
23 May	Eric Clapton	Unplugged	8 weeks
30 May	Eric Clapton	Unplugged	8 weeks
6 June	Spin Doctors	Pocket Full of Kryptonite	2 weeks
13 June	Spin Doctors	Pocket Full of Kryptonite	2 weeks
20 June	Janet Jackson	janet.	4 weeks
27 June	Janet Jackson	janet.	4 weeks
4 July	Janet Jackson	janet.	4 weeks
11 July	Led Zeppelin	Remasters	1 week
18 July	U2	Zooropa	4 weeks
25 July	U2	Zooropa	4 weeks
1 August	U2	Zooropa	4 weeks
8 August	U2	Zooropa	4 weeks
15 August	UB40	Promises and Lies	1 week
22 August	Diesel	The Lobbyist	1 week
29 August	Billy Joel	River of Dreams	4 weeks
5 September	Billy Joel	River of Dreams	4 weeks
12 September	Billy Joel	River of Dreams	4 weeks
19 September	Billy Joel	River of Dreams	4 weeks
26 September	Meat Loaf	Bat Out of Hell II: Back into Hell	4 weeks
3 October	Meat Loaf	Bat Out of Hell II: Back into Hell	4 weeks
10 October	Meat Loaf	Bat Out of Hell II: Back into Hell	4 weeks
17 October	Meat Loaf	Bat Out of Hell II: Back into Hell	4 weeks
24 October	Michael Crawford	A Touch of Music in the Night	2 weeks
31 October	Pearl Jam	Vs.	1 week
7 November	John Farnham	Then Again...	1 week
14 November	Michael Crawford	A Touch of Music in the Night	2 weeks
21 November	Bryan Adams	So Far So Good	14 weeks
28 November	Bryan Adams	So Far So Good	14 weeks
5 December	Guns N' Roses	"The Spaghetti Incident?"	1 week
12 December	Bryan Adams	So Far So Good	14 weeks
19 December	Bryan Adams	So Far So Good	14 weeks
26 December	Bryan Adams	So Far So Good	14 weeks

== 1994 ==
Date	Artist	Album	Weeks at number one
2 January	Bryan Adams	So Far So Good	14 weeks
9 January	Bryan Adams	So Far So Good	14 weeks
16 January	Bryan Adams	So Far So Good	14 weeks
23 January	Bryan Adams	So Far So Good	14 weeks
30 January	Bryan Adams	So Far So Good	14 weeks
6 February	Bryan Adams	So Far So Good	14 weeks
13 February	Bryan Adams	So Far So Good	14 weeks
20 February	Bryan Adams	So Far So Good	14 weeks
27 February	Bryan Adams	So Far So Good	14 weeks
6 March	Soundgarden	Superunknown	1 week
13 March	Michael Bolton	The One Thing	2 weeks
20 March	Michael Bolton	The One Thing	2 weeks
27 March	Mariah Carey	Music Box	18 weeks
3 April	Pantera	Far Beyond Driven	1 week
10 April	Mariah Carey	Music Box	18 weeks
17 April	Pink Floyd	The Division Bell	3 weeks
24 April	Pink Floyd	The Division Bell	3 weeks
1 May	Pink Floyd	The Division Bell	3 weeks
8 May	Mariah Carey	Music Box	18 weeks
15 May	Mariah Carey	Music Box	18 weeks
22 May	Mariah Carey	Music Box	18 weeks
29 May	Mariah Carey	Music Box	18 weeks
5 June	Mariah Carey	Music Box	18 weeks
12 June	Mariah Carey	Music Box	18 weeks
19 June	Mariah Carey	Music Box	18 weeks
26 June	Stone Temple Pilots	Purple	1 week
3 July	Mariah Carey	Music Box	18 weeks
10 July	Mariah Carey	Music Box	18 weeks
17 July	Mariah Carey	Music Box	18 weeks
24 July	Mariah Carey	Music Box	18 weeks
31 July	The Rolling Stones	Voodoo Lounge	1 week
7 August	Mariah Carey	Music Box	18 weeks
14 August	Mariah Carey	Music Box	18 weeks
21 August	Mariah Carey	Music Box	18 weeks
28 August	Mariah Carey	Music Box	18 weeks
4 September	Garth Brooks	In Pieces	1 week
11 September	The Three Tenors	The Three Tenors in Concert 1994	1 week
18 September	Mariah Carey	Music Box	18 weeks
25 September	Various artists	The Adventures of Priscilla, Queen of the Desert: Original Motion Picture Soundtrack	4 weeks
2 October	Various artists	The Adventures of Priscilla, Queen of the Desert: Original Motion Picture Soundtrack	4 weeks
9 October	Various artists	The Adventures of Priscilla, Queen of the Desert: Original Motion Picture Soundtrack	4 weeks
16 October	Various artists	The Adventures of Priscilla, Queen of the Desert: Original Motion Picture Soundtrack	4 weeks
23 October	Bon Jovi	Cross Road	2 weeks
30 October	Bon Jovi	Cross Road	2 weeks
6 November	Madonna	Bedtime Stories	1 week
13 November	Nirvana	MTV Unplugged in New York	3 weeks
20 November	Nirvana	MTV Unplugged in New York	3 weeks
27 November	Nirvana	MTV Unplugged in New York	3 weeks
4 December	Various artists	Forrest Gump: The Soundtrack	3 weeks
11 December	Various artists	Forrest Gump: The Soundtrack	3 weeks
18 December	Pearl Jam	Vitalogy	1 week
25 December	The 12th Man	Wired World of Sports II	4 weeks

== 1995 ==
Date	Artist	Album	Weeks at number one
1 January	The 12th Man	Wired World of Sports II	4 weeks
8 January	The 12th Man	Wired World of Sports II	4 weeks
15 January	The 12th Man	Wired World of Sports II	4 weeks
22 January	Various artists	Forrest Gump: The Soundtrack	1 week
29 January	The Cranberries	No Need to Argue	1 week
5 February	The Offspring	Smash	3 weeks
12 February	The Offspring	Smash	3 weeks
19 February	The Offspring	Smash	3 weeks
26 February	Janet Jackson	janet.	4 weeks
5 March	You Am I	Hi Fi Way	1 week
12 March	Bruce Springsteen	Greatest Hits	1 week
19 March	Green Day	Dookie	3 weeks
26 March	Green Day	Dookie	3 weeks
2 April	Green Day	Dookie	3 weeks
9 April	Silverchair	Frogstomp	3 weeks
16 April	Silverchair	Frogstomp	3 weeks
23 April	Silverchair	Frogstomp	3 weeks
30 April	The Cruel Sea	Three Legged Dog	2 weeks
7 May	The Cruel Sea	Three Legged Dog	2 weeks
14 May	Celine Dion	The Colour of My Love	8 weeks
21 May	Celine Dion	The Colour of My Love	8 weeks
28 May	Celine Dion	The Colour of My Love	8 weeks
4 June	Celine Dion	The Colour of My Love	8 weeks
11 June	Sheryl Crow	Tuesday Night Music Club	2 weeks
18 June	Sheryl Crow	Tuesday Night Music Club	2 weeks
25 June	Pink Floyd	Pulse	1 week
2 July	Michael Jackson	HIStory: Past, Present and Future, Book I	3 weeks
9 July	Michael Jackson	HIStory: Past, Present and Future, Book I	3 weeks
16 July	Bon Jovi	These Days	2 weeks
23 July	Bon Jovi	These Days	2 weeks
30 July	Celine Dion	The Colour of My Love	8 weeks
6 August	Celine Dion	The Colour of My Love	8 weeks
13 August	Live	Throwing Copper	7 weeks
20 August	Live	Throwing Copper	7 weeks
27 August	Live	Throwing Copper	7 weeks
3 September	Live	Throwing Copper	7 weeks
10 September	Celine Dion	The Colour of My Love	8 weeks
17 September	Celine Dion	The Colour of My Love	8 weeks
24 September	Red Hot Chili Peppers	One Hot Minute	2 weeks
1 October	Red Hot Chili Peppers	One Hot Minute	2 weeks
8 October	AC/DC	Ballbreaker	1 week
15 October	Mariah Carey	Daydream	1 week
22 October	Various artists	Dangerous Minds: Music from the Motion Picture	2 weeks
29 October	Various artists	Dangerous Minds: Music from the Motion Picture	2 weeks
5 November	The Smashing Pumpkins	Mellon Collie and the Infinite Sadness	2 weeks
12 November	The Smashing Pumpkins	Mellon Collie and the Infinite Sadness	2 weeks
19 November	Tina Arena	Don't Ask	1 week
26 November	Madonna	Something to Remember	1 week
3 December	The Beatles	Anthology 1	2 weeks
10 December	The Beatles	Anthology 1	2 weeks
17 December	Enya	The Memory of Trees	4 weeks
24 December	Enya	The Memory of Trees	4 weeks
31 December	Enya	The Memory of Trees	4 weeks

== 1996 ==
Date	Artist	Album	Weeks at number one
7 January	Enya	The Memory of Trees	4 weeks
14 January	Live	Throwing Copper	7 weeks
21 January	Live	Throwing Copper	7 weeks
28 January	Live	Throwing Copper	7 weeks
4 February	Oasis	(What's the Story) Morning Glory?	5 weeks
11 February	Oasis	(What's the Story) Morning Glory?	5 weeks
18 February	Oasis	(What's the Story) Morning Glory?	5 weeks
25 February	Oasis	(What's the Story) Morning Glory?	5 weeks
3 March	Oasis	(What's the Story) Morning Glory?	5 weeks
10 March	Alanis Morissette	Jagged Little Pill	10 weeks
17 March	Alanis Morissette	Jagged Little Pill	10 weeks
24 March	Celine Dion	Falling into You	4 weeks
31 March	Alanis Morissette	Jagged Little Pill	10 weeks
7 April	Alanis Morissette	Jagged Little Pill	10 weeks
14 April	Alanis Morissette	Jagged Little Pill	10 weeks
21 April	Alanis Morissette	Jagged Little Pill	10 weeks
28 April	Alanis Morissette	Jagged Little Pill	10 weeks
5 May	Alanis Morissette	Jagged Little Pill	10 weeks
12 May	The Cranberries	To the Faithful Departed	1 week
19 May	Alanis Morissette	Jagged Little Pill	10 weeks
26 May	George Michael	Older	1 week
2 June	Soundgarden	Down on the Upside	1 week
9 June	Alanis Morissette	Jagged Little Pill	10 weeks
16 June	Metallica	Load	2 weeks
23 June	Metallica	Load	2 weeks
30 June	Celine Dion	Falling into You	4 weeks
7 July	You Am I	Hourly, Daily	1 week
14 July	Celine Dion	Falling into You	4 weeks
21 July	Crowded House	Recurring Dream: The Very Best of Crowded House	10 weeks
28 July	Crowded House	Recurring Dream: The Very Best of Crowded House	10 weeks
4 August	Crowded House	Recurring Dream: The Very Best of Crowded House	10 weeks
11 August	Crowded House	Recurring Dream: The Very Best of Crowded House	10 weeks
18 August	Celine Dion	Falling into You	4 weeks
25 August	The Corrs	Forgiven, Not Forgotten	3 weeks
1 September	Pearl Jam	No Code	2 weeks
8 September	Pearl Jam	No Code	2 weeks
15 September	The Corrs	Forgiven, Not Forgotten	3 weeks
22 September	R.E.M.	New Adventures in Hi-Fi	1 week
29 September	The Corrs	Forgiven, Not Forgotten	3 weeks
6 October	Toni Childs	The Very Best of Toni Childs	6 weeks
13 October	Nirvana	From the Muddy Banks of the Wishkah	1 week
20 October	Toni Childs	The Very Best of Toni Childs	6 weeks
27 October	Jimmy Barnes	Barnes Hits Anthology	1 week
3 November	Toni Childs	The Very Best of Toni Childs	6 weeks
10 November	Toni Childs	The Very Best of Toni Childs	6 weeks
17 November	Toni Childs	The Very Best of Toni Childs	6 weeks
24 November	Toni Childs	The Very Best of Toni Childs	6 weeks
1 December	Michael Jackson	HIStory: Past, Present and Future, Book I	3 weeks
8 December	Crowded House	Recurring Dream: The Very Best of Crowded House	10 weeks
15 December	Crowded House	Recurring Dream: The Very Best of Crowded House	10 weeks
22 December	Crowded House	Recurring Dream: The Very Best of Crowded House	10 weeks
29 December	Crowded House	Recurring Dream: The Very Best of Crowded House	10 weeks

== 1997 ==
Date	Artist	Album	Weeks at number one
5 January	Crowded House	Recurring Dream: The Very Best of Crowded House	10 weeks
12 January	Crowded House	Recurring Dream: The Very Best of Crowded House	10 weeks
19 January	Various artists	William Shakespeare's Romeo + Juliet: Music from the Motion Picture	9 weeks
26 January	Various artists	William Shakespeare's Romeo + Juliet: Music from the Motion Picture	9 weeks
2 February	Various artists	William Shakespeare's Romeo + Juliet: Music from the Motion Picture	9 weeks
9 February	Various artists	William Shakespeare's Romeo + Juliet: Music from the Motion Picture	9 weeks
16 February	Silverchair	Freak Show	1 week
23 February	Various artists	William Shakespeare's Romeo + Juliet: Music from the Motion Picture	9 weeks
2 March	Various artists	William Shakespeare's Romeo + Juliet: Music from the Motion Picture	9 weeks
9 March	Various artists	William Shakespeare's Romeo + Juliet: Music from the Motion Picture	9 weeks
16 March	U2	Pop	1 week
23 March	Various artists	William Shakespeare's Romeo + Juliet: Music from the Motion Picture	9 weeks
30 March	Various artists	William Shakespeare's Romeo + Juliet: Music from the Motion Picture	9 weeks
6 April	Savage Garden	Savage Garden	19 weeks
13 April	Savage Garden	Savage Garden	19 weeks
20 April	Savage Garden	Savage Garden	19 weeks
27 April	Savage Garden	Savage Garden	19 weeks
4 May	Savage Garden	Savage Garden	19 weeks
11 May	Savage Garden	Savage Garden	19 weeks
18 May	Savage Garden	Savage Garden	19 weeks
25 May	Savage Garden	Savage Garden	19 weeks
1 June	Savage Garden	Savage Garden	19 weeks
8 June	Savage Garden	Savage Garden	19 weeks
15 June	Savage Garden	Savage Garden	19 weeks
22 June	Savage Garden	Savage Garden	19 weeks
29 June	Faith No More	Album of the Year	1 week
6 July	Savage Garden	Savage Garden	19 weeks
13 July	The Prodigy	The Fat of the Land	1 week
20 July	Savage Garden	Savage Garden	19 weeks
27 July	Savage Garden	Savage Garden	19 weeks
3 August	Savage Garden	Savage Garden	19 weeks
10 August	Hanson	Middle of Nowhere	2 weeks
17 August	Hanson	Middle of Nowhere	2 weeks
24 August	Tina Arena	In Deep	3 weeks
31 August	Oasis	Be Here Now	1 week
7 September	Savage Garden	Savage Garden	19 weeks
14 September	Tina Arena	In Deep	3 weeks
21 September	Tina Arena	In Deep	3 weeks
28 September	Mariah Carey	Butterfly	1 week
5 October	Savage Garden	Savage Garden	19 weeks
12 October	Savage Garden	Savage Garden	19 weeks
19 October	John Farnham	Anthology 1: Greatest Hits 1986–1997	1 week
26 October	Midnight Oil	20,000 Watt R.S.L.	1 week
2 November	Various artists	My Best's Friend Wedding: Music from the Motion Picture	4 weeks
9 November	Various artists	My Best's Friend Wedding: Music from the Motion Picture	4 weeks
16 November	Various artists	My Best's Friend Wedding: Music from the Motion Picture	4 weeks
23 November	Various artists	My Best's Friend Wedding: Music from the Motion Picture	4 weeks
30 November	Celine Dion	Let's Talk About Love	5 weeks
7 December	Celine Dion	Let's Talk About Love	5 weeks
14 December	Celine Dion	Let's Talk About Love	5 weeks
21 December	The 12th Man	Bill Lawry... This Is Your Life	2 weeks
28 December	The 12th Man	Bill Lawry... This Is Your Life	2 weeks

== 1998 ==
Date	Artist	Album	Weeks at number one
4 January	Celine Dion	Let's Talk About Love	5 weeks
11 January	Celine Dion	Let's Talk About Love	5 weeks
18 January	Aqua	Aquarium	2 weeks
25 January	Aqua	Aquarium	2 weeks
1 February	James Horner	Titanic: Music from the Motion Picture	11 weeks
8 February	James Horner	Titanic: Music from the Motion Picture	11 weeks
15 February	Pearl Jam	Yield	1 week
22 February	James Horner	Titanic: Music from the Motion Picture	11 weeks
1 March	James Horner	Titanic: Music from the Motion Picture	11 weeks
8 March	James Horner	Titanic: Music from the Motion Picture	11 weeks
15 March	Madonna	Ray of Light	1 week
22 March	James Horner	Titanic: Music from the Motion Picture	11 weeks
29 March	James Horner	Titanic: Music from the Motion Picture	11 weeks
5 April	James Horner	Titanic: Music from the Motion Picture	11 weeks
12 April	James Horner	Titanic: Music from the Motion Picture	11 weeks
19 April	James Horner	Titanic: Music from the Motion Picture	11 weeks
26 April	James Horner	Titanic: Music from the Motion Picture	11 weeks
3 May	Massive Attack	Mezzanine	1 week
10 May	Various artists	The Wedding Singer: Music from the Motion Picture	1 week
17 May	Jeff Buckley	Sketches for My Sweetheart the Drunk	1 week
24 May	Matchbox 20	Yourself or Someone Like You	6 weeks
31 May	Matchbox 20	Yourself or Someone Like You	6 weeks
7 June	You Am I	You Am I's #4 Record	1 week
14 June	The Smashing Pumpkins	Adore	1 week
21 June	Various artists	City of Angels: Music from the Motion Picture	2 weeks
28 June	Neil Finn	Try Whistling This	2 weeks
5 July	Neil Finn	Try Whistling This	2 weeks
12 July	Various artists	City of Angels: Music from the Motion Picture	2 weeks
19 July	Beastie Boys	Hello Nasty	1 week
26 July	Matchbox 20	Yourself or Someone Like You	6 weeks
2 August	Matchbox 20	Yourself or Someone Like You	6 weeks
9 August	Matchbox 20	Yourself or Someone Like You	6 weeks
16 August	Various artists	Grease: The Original Soundtrack from the Motion Picture	1 week
23 August	Natalie Imbruglia	Left of the Middle	3 weeks
30 August	Korn	Follow the Leader	1 week
6 September	Natalie Imbruglia	Left of the Middle	3 weeks
13 September	Matchbox 20	Yourself or Someone Like You	6 weeks
20 September	Powderfinger	Internationalist	1 week
27 September	Marilyn Manson	Mechanical Animals	1 week
4 October	Kiss	Psycho Circus	1 week
11 October	Vonda Shepard	Songs from Ally McBeal	1 week
18 October	Cold Chisel	The Last Wave of Summer	1 week
25 October	The Living End	The Living End	2 weeks
1 November	Natalie Imbruglia	Left of the Middle	3 weeks
8 November	The Living End	The Living End	2 weeks
15 November	U2	The Best of 1980–1990	5 weeks
22 November	U2	The Best of 1980–1990	5 weeks
29 November	U2	The Best of 1980–1990	5 weeks
6 December	U2	The Best of 1980–1990	5 weeks
13 December	Various artists	Chef Aid: The South Park Album	1 week
20 December	Olivia Newton-John, John Farnham and Anthony Warlow	Highlights from The Main Event	2 weeks
27 December	Olivia Newton-John, John Farnham and Anthony Warlow	Highlights from The Main Event	2 weeks

== 1999 ==
Date	Artist	Album	Weeks at number one
3 January	U2	The Best of 1980–1990	5 weeks
10 January	The Offspring	Americana	5 weeks
17 January	The Offspring	Americana	5 weeks
24 January	The Offspring	Americana	5 weeks
31 January	The Offspring	Americana	5 weeks
7 February	The Offspring	Americana	5 weeks
14 February	Shania Twain	Come on Over	20 weeks
21 February	Shania Twain	Come on Over	20 weeks
28 February	Shania Twain	Come on Over	20 weeks
7 March	Shania Twain	Come on Over	20 weeks
14 March	Shania Twain	Come on Over	20 weeks
21 March	Silverchair	Neon Ballroom	1 week
28 March	Shania Twain	Come on Over	20 weeks
4 April	Bee Gees	One Night Only	6 weeks
11 April	Bee Gees	One Night Only	6 weeks
18 April	Bee Gees	One Night Only	6 weeks
25 April	Bee Gees	One Night Only	6 weeks
2 May	Bee Gees	One Night Only	6 weeks
9 May	Shania Twain	Come on Over	20 weeks
16 May	Bee Gees	One Night Only	6 weeks
23 May	Ricky Martin	Ricky Martin	1 week
30 May	Human Nature	Counting Down	1 week
6 June	Various artists	Songs from Dawson's Creek	6 weeks
13 June	Various artists	Songs from Dawson's Creek	6 weeks
20 June	Red Hot Chili Peppers	Californication	1 week
27 June	Jamiroquai	Synkronized	1 week
4 July	Various artists	Songs from Dawson's Creek	6 weeks
11 July	Various artists	Songs from Dawson's Creek	6 weeks
18 July	Various artists	Songs from Dawson's Creek	6 weeks
25 July	Various artists	Songs from Dawson's Creek	6 weeks
1 August	Shania Twain	Come on Over	20 weeks
8 August	Shania Twain	Come on Over	20 weeks
15 August	Shania Twain	Come on Over	20 weeks
22 August	Shania Twain	Come on Over	20 weeks
29 August	Shania Twain	Come on Over	20 weeks
5 September	Shania Twain	Come on Over	20 weeks
12 September	Shania Twain	Come on Over	20 weeks
19 September	Shania Twain	Come on Over	20 weeks
26 September	Shania Twain	Come on Over	20 weeks
3 October	Shania Twain	Come on Over	20 weeks
10 October	Shania Twain	Come on Over	20 weeks
17 October	Live	The Distance to Here	1 week
24 October	Shania Twain	Come on Over	20 weeks
31 October	Taxiride	Imaginate	1 week
7 November	Savage Garden	Affirmation	6 weeks
14 November	Savage Garden	Affirmation	6 weeks
21 November	Savage Garden	Affirmation	6 weeks
28 November	Korn	Issues	1 week
5 December	Metallica with Michael Kamen conducting the San Francisco Symphony	S&M	1 week
12 December	Savage Garden	Affirmation	6 weeks
19 December	Shania Twain	Come on Over	20 weeks
26 December	Celine Dion	All the Way... A Decade of Song	2 weeks^{2}

- ^{2} Celine Dion's All the Way... A Decade of Song officially spent two weeks at number one, but as this page lists week ending dates (Sundays) and the pages pertaining to the 2000s lists week beginning dates (Mondays), the second week is not listed on the number-one albums of 2000.

== See also ==
- Music of Australia
- List of UK Albums Chart number ones of the 1990s
