= List of top 25 singles for 1996 in Australia =

Top 25 singles of 1996 < 1995 1997 >

Other Australian top charts for 1996
- top 25 albums
- Triple J Hottest 100

Australian number-one charts of 1996
- albums
- singles

The following lists the top 100 singles of 1996 in Australia from the Australian Recording Industry Association (ARIA) End of Year Singles Chart.

#	Title	Artist	Highest pos. reached	Weeks at No. 1
1.	"Macarena"	Los del Río	1	9
2.	"Killing Me Softly"	Fugees (Refugee Camp)	1	7 (Note: "Killing Me Softly" a cover of the Roberta Flack song, debuted a #1 in June, 1996 and remained in that spot for seven consecutive weeks.)
3.	"Because You Loved Me"	Celine Dion	1	3
4.	"How Bizarre"	OMC	1	5
5.	"Wannabe"	Spice Girls	1	6 (Note: "Wannabe" entered the charts in September, 1996 and reached No. 1 in November, 1996 where it remained until the first week in January, 1997. It remained in the charts until April, 1997.)
6.	"One of Us"	Joan Osborne	1	5
7.	"Missing" (The Remix EP)	Everything but the Girl	2	—
8.	"Return of the Mack"	Mark Morrison	2	—
9.	"What's Love Got to Do with It"	Warren G	2	—
10.	"You're Makin' Me High"	Toni Braxton	2	—
11.	"X-Files Theme"	Triple X	2	—
12.	"I Want You"	Savage Garden	4	—
13.	"I Love You Always Forever"	Donna Lewis	2	—
14.	"Macarena"	Los del Mar feat. Pedro Castano	2	—
15.	"Give Me One Reason"	Tracy Chapman	3	—
16.	"Boombastic"	Shaggy	1	4
17.	"Sexual Healing"	Max-A-Million	5	—
18.	"Be My Lover"	La Bouche	2	—
19.	"Wonderwall"	Oasis	1	1 (Note: "Wonderwall" entered the charts in December, 1995 and reached No. 1 in February, 1996. It remained in the charts until May, 1996.)
20.	"Fastlove"	George Michael	1	4
21.	"Theme from Mission: Impossible"	Larry Mullen and Adam Clayton	2	—
22.	"Just a Girl"	No Doubt	3	—
23.	"Ooh Aah... Just a Little Bit"	Gina G	5	—
24.	"I'll Be There for You"	The Rembrandts	3	—
25.	"Ironic"	Alanis Morissette	3	—
26.	"Where Do You Go"	No Mercy	2	—
27.	"Runaway"	The Corrs	10	—
28.	"Father and Son"	Boyzone	2	—
29.	"1, 2, 3, 4 (Sumpin' New)"	Coolio	12	—
30.	"Spaceman"	Babylon Zoo	3	—
31.	"Anything"	3T	5	—
32.	"Children"	Robert Miles	5	—
33.	"Nobody Knows"	Tony Rich Project	2	—
34.	"California Love"	2Pac	4	—
35.	"Sometimes When We Touch"	Newton	5	—
36.	"Let's Make a Night to Remember"	Bryan Adams	7	—
37.	"Boom Boom Boom"	The Outhere Brothers	2	—
38.	"Breakfast at Tiffany's"	Deep Blue Something	3	—
39.	"Tha Crossroads"	Bone Thugs-n-Harmony	15	—
40.	"One Sweet Day"	Mariah Carey with Boyz II Men	2	—
41.	"Diggin' on You"	TLC	6	—
42.	"It's All Coming Back to Me Now"	Celine Dion	8	—
43.	"Get Down on It"	Peter Andre feat. Past to Present	5	—
44.	"Until It Sleeps"	Metallica	1	1
45.	"That Girl"	Maxi Priest feat. Shaggy	7	—
46.	"Mother Mother"	Tracy Bonham	5	—
47.	"Sweet Dreams"	La Bouche	8	—
48.	"Wrap Me Up"	Alex Party	11	—
49.	"I Live for You"	Chynna Phillips	9	—
50.	"Blue"	LeAnn Rimes	10	—
51.	"I Love to Love"	La Bouche	6	—
52.	"Hero of the Day"	Metallica	2	—
53.	"Power of a Woman"	Eternal	8	—
54.	"Don't Take It Personal (Just One of Dem Days)"	Monica	7	—
55.	"Tell Me"	Groove Theory	6	—
56.	"Glycerine"	Bush	5	—
57.	"Don't Stop Movin'"	Livin' Joy	6	—
58.	"Peaches"	The Presidents of the United States of America	13	—
59.	"Change the World"	Eric Clapton	8	—
60.	"Wishes"	Human Nature	6	—
61.	"It's Oh So Quiet"	Björk	6	—
62.	"Head over Feet"	Alanis Morissette	12	—
63.	"Waterfalls"	TLC	4	—
64.	"Always Be My Baby"	Mariah Carey	17	—
65.	"Beautiful Life"	Ace of Base	11	—
66.	"I Feel It"	DJ Darren Briais vs. DJ Peewee Ferris	20	—
67.	"'Til You Do Me Right"	After 7	16	—
68.	"Hey Lover"	LL Cool J	11	—
69.	"Apple Eyes"	Swoop	9	—
70.	"In Too Deep"	Belinda Carlisle	11	—
71.	"They Don't Care About Us"	Michael Jackson	16	—
72.	"To the Moon and Back"	Savage Garden	1	1
73.	"Who Do U Love"	Deborah Cox	11	—
74.	"Lover Lover"	Jimmy Barnes	6	—
75.	"How Do U Want It"	2Pac feat. K-Ci & JoJo	24	—
76.	"Naked and Sacred"	Chynna Phillips	15	—
77.	"Pepper"	Butthole Surfers	15	—
78.	"Movin' Up"	Dreamworld	12	—
79.	"Salvation"	The Cranberries	8	—
80.	"Let's Groove"	CDB	2	—
81.	"The Only Thing That Looks Good on Me Is You"	Bryan Adams	19	—
82.	"Santa Monica"	Everclear	25	—
83.	"I Am Blessed"	Eternal	14	—
84.	"Who You Are"	Pearl Jam	5	—
85.	"Closer to Free"	BoDeans	11	—
86.	"Lump"	The Presidents of the United States of America	11	—
87.	"(If You're Not in It for Love) I'm Outta Here!"	Shania Twain	5	—
88.	"Not an Addict"	K's Choice	22	—
89.	"There's Nothing I Won't Do"	JX	26	—
90.	"Jesus to a Child"	George Michael	1	2
91.	"Kitty"	The Presidents of the United States of America	19	—
92.	"Hand in My Pocket"	Alanis Morissette	13	—
93.	"Automatic Lover (Call for Love)"	Real McCoy	18	—
94.	"1979"	The Smashing Pumpkins	16	—
95.	"Un-Break My Heart"	Toni Braxton	6	—
96.	"It's Alright"	Deni Hines	4	—
97.	"Se a vida é (That's the Way Life Is)"	Pet Shop Boys	11	—
98.	"Falling into You"	Celine Dion	12	—
99.	"Ready or Not"	Fugees	24	—
100.	"How Deep Is Your Love"	Take That	12	—

Peak chart positions from 1996 are from the ARIA Charts, overall position on the End of Year Chart is calculated by ARIA based on the number of weeks and position that the song reached within the Top 50 singles for each week during 1996.
