= List of top 25 albums for 1999 in Australia =

Top 25 albums of 1999 < 1998 2000 >

Other Australian top charts for 1999
- top 25 singles
- Triple J Hottest 100

Australian number-one charts of 1999
- albums
- singles

The following lists the top 100 albums of 1999 in Australia from the Australian Recording Industry Association (ARIA) End of Year Albums Chart.

#	Title	Artist	Highest pos. reached	Weeks at No. 1
1.	Come On Over	Shania Twain	1	20 (Note: Come On Over debuted on the charts in November, 1997 reaching #1 in February–March, 1999, in May, 1999 and again in August–September, 1999. It remained in the charts until September, 2000.)
2.	One Night Only	Bee Gees	1	6
3.	Americana	The Offspring	1	5 (Note: Americana debuted on the charts in November, 1998 reaching #1 in January–February, 1999. It remained in the charts until October, 1999.)
4.	Affirmation	Savage Garden	1	6 (Note: Affirmation debuted at #1 in November, 1999 and also reached #1 in May, 2000 and July, 2000. It remained in the charts until April, 2001.)
5.	Songs from Dawson's Creek	Soundtrack	1	6
6.	Ricky Martin	Ricky Martin	1	1
7.	Baby One More Time	Britney Spears	2	
8.	ABBA Gold	ABBA	1	2 (Note: ABBA Gold entered the charts in 1992 and debuted at #1 in December, 1992. It re-entered the charts for five months (between November, 1994 and March, 1995). It re-entered the charts for a third time in May, 1999 peaking at #2 in June, 1999 remaining for a further six months. It re-entered the charts again in 2000, 2008 and 2009.)
9.	Californication	Red Hot Chili Peppers	1	1
10.	You've Come a Long Way, Baby	Fatboy Slim	2	
11.	Millennium	Backstreet Boys	2	
12.	Songs from Ally McBeal	Vonda Shepard	1	1
13.	The Living End	The Living End	1	2 (Note: The Living End debuted at #1 in October, 1998 and remained in the charts until November, 1999)
14.	Follow the Leader	Korn	1	1 (Note: Follow the Leader debuted at #1 in August, 1998 and remained in the charts until October, 1999. It briefly re-entered the charts in 2000.)
15.	All the Way... A Decade of Song	Celine Dion	1	2 (Note: All the Way... entered the charts in December, 1999 and reached #1 at the end of the month remaining in the #1 spot in the first week in January, 2000. It remained in the charts until June, 2000. It briefly re-entered the charts in 2000.)
16.	Neon Ballroom	Silverchair	1	1
17.	Internationalist	Powderfinger	1	1
18.	Issues	Korn	1	2
19.	Ladies and Gentlemen ... The Best of	George Michael	2	
20.	The Party Album	Vengaboys	4	
21.	Spirit	Jewel	5	
22.	Notting Hill	Soundtrack	4	
23.	Believe	Cher	13	
24.	Highlights from The Main Event	John Farnham, Olivia Newton-John, Anthony Warlow	1	2
25.	Talk on Corners	The Corrs	9	
26.	Supernatural	Santana	1	1
27.	Sogno	Andrea Bocelli	3	
28.	The Best of 1980–1990	U2	1	5
29.	Counting Down	Human Nature	1	1
30.	Chef Aid: The South Park Album	Soundtrack	1	1
31.	On How Life Is	Macy Gray	1	8
32.	Sacred Arias	Andrea Bocelli	7	
33.	5ive	Five	8	
34.	Soul's Core	Shawn Mullins	11	
35.	The Battle of Los Angeles	Rage Against the Machine	2	
36.	The Distance to Here	Live	1	1
37.	Imaginate	Taxiride	1	1
38.	Significant Other	Limp Bizkit	5	
39.	Romanza	Andrea Bocelli	2	
40.	True Romantic	Kate Ceberano	9	
41.	Invincible	Five	5	
42.	S&M	Metallica	1	1
43.	B*Witched	B*Witched	5	
44.	Stepping Stones	Wendy Matthews	4	
45.	Celebrity Skin	Hole	4	
46.	The Miseducation of Lauryn Hill	Lauryn Hill	2	
47.	FanMail	TLC	15	
48.	Pokémon: The First Movie	Soundtrack	9	
49.	Reload	Tom Jones	3	
50.	By Request	Boyzone	3	
51.	Live at the Regent Theatre – 1st July 1999	John Farnham	7	
52.	Austin Powers: The Spy Who Shagged Me	Soundtrack	5	
53.	A Little Bit of Mambo	Lou Bega	19	
54.	Yourself or Someone Like You	Matchbox Twenty	1	6
55.	Enema of the State	Blink-182	4	
56.	The Greatest Hits	Cher	5	
57.	Wide Open Spaces	Dixie Chicks	35	
58.	The Ultimate Collection	Creedence Clearwater Revival	10	
59.	Sultans of Swing: The Very Best of Dire Straits	Dire Straits	4	
60.	Michael Hutchence	Michael Hutchence	3	
61.	Ray of Light	Madonna	1	1
62.	Breathing Tornados	Ben Lee	13	
63.	Synkronized	Jamiroquai	1	1
64.	Life Is Peachy	Korn	26	
65.	Easy	Grinspoon	4	
66.	The Matrix: Music from the Motion Picture	Soundtrack	5	
67.	Chisel	Cold Chisel	3	
68.	Left of the Middle	Natalie Imbruglia	1	3
69.	Love This City	The Whitlams	3	
70.	Of Someday Shambles	Jebediah	2	
71.	Rainbow	Mariah Carey	4	
72.	Greatest Hits	2Pac	11	
73.	Pokémon 2.B.A. Master	Soundtrack	20	
74.	Songs from the Last Century	George Michael	12	
75.	Dizzy Up the Girl	Goo Goo Dolls	17	
76.	Korn	Korn	46	
77.	5	Lenny Kravitz	17	
78.	Love Will Always Win	Faith Hill	20	
79.	On the 6	Jennifer Lopez	11	
80.	Afterglow	Crowded House	36	
81.	The Ultimate Collection	Neil Diamond	30	
82.	Sunburn	Fuel	16	
83.	...art	Regurgitator	2	
84.	Nimrod	Green Day	3	
85.	Charlotte Church	Charlotte Church	41	
86.	The Way It Is	John Williamson	10	
87.	Without You I'm Nothing	Placebo	14	
88.	Heart and Soul: New Songs from Ally McBeal	Vonda Shepard	17	
89.	Live on Two Legs	Pearl Jam	4	
90.	Jump and Jive with Hi-5	Hi-5	33	
91.	VH1 Divas Live	Celine Dion, Gloria Estefan, Aretha Franklin, Shania Twain, & Mariah Carey	12	
92.	Music Live from the Panel	The Panel	15	
93.	Do Not Talk Over Me	Guido Hatzis	11	
94.	Version 2.0	Garbage	5	
95.	Never Say Never	Brandy	13	
96.	South Park: Bigger, Longer & Uncut	Soundtrack	6	
97.	Family Values Tour '98	Family Values Tour	8	
98.	Unplugged	The Corrs	14	
99.	Schizophonic	Geri Halliwell	22	
100.	Astro Lounge	Smash Mouth	29	

Peak chart positions from 1999 are from the ARIA Charts, overall position on the End of Year Chart is calculated by ARIA based on the number of weeks and position that the records reach within the Top 50 albums for each week during 1999.
