= List of top 25 singles for 1997 in Australia =

Top 25 singles of 1997 < 1996 1998 >

Other Australian top charts for 1997
- top 25 albums
- Triple J Hottest 100

Australian number-one charts of 1997
- albums
- singles

The following lists the top 100 singles of 1997 in Australia from the Australian Recording Industry Association (ARIA) End of Year Singles Chart.

#	Title	Artist	Highest pos. reached	Weeks at No. 1
1.	"Candle in the Wind 1997"	Elton John	1	6 (Note: "Candle in the Wind" debuted at No. 1 in October, 1997 remaining in that position for six consecutive weeks and in the top ten for a further eight weeks.)
2.	"Barbie Girl"	Aqua	1	3 (Note: "Barbie Girl" entered the charts in September, 1997 and reached No. 1 in the middle of November, 1997, where it remained until the end of that month. Two weeks later Aqua's second single, "Doctor Jones" reclaimed the #1 spot.)
3.	"Tubthumping"	Chumbawamba	1	3
4.	"I'll Be Missing You"	Puff Daddy and Faith Evans	1	5
5.	"MMMBop"	Hanson	1	9 (Note: "Mmmm Bop" debuted at No. 1 in the first week of June, 1997 where it remained until the last week in July.)
6.	"Men in Black"	Will Smith	1	4
7.	"Truly, Madly, Deeply"	Savage Garden	1	8
8.	"Don't Speak"	No Doubt	1	8
9.	"Breathe"	The Prodigy	2	—N/a
10.	"Break My Stride"	Unique II	2	—N/a
11.	"Da Ya Think I'm Sexy"	N-Trance	3	—N/a
12.	"How Do I Live"	Trisha Yearwood	3	—N/a
13.	"Where's the Love"	Hanson	2	—N/a
14.	"Doctor Jones"	Aqua	1	7 (Note: "Doctor Jones" entered the charts in the first week of December, 1997 reaching the #1 spot in the last week of the year, where it remained until the second week of February, 1998.)
15.	"I Will Come to You"	Hanson	2	—N/a
16.	"Bitch"	Meredith Brooks	2	—N/a
17.	"To the Moon and Back"	Savage Garden	1	1
18.	"Don't Let Go (Love)"	En Vogue	3	—N/a
19.	"Sexy Eyes"	Whigfield	6	—N/a
20.	"Freak"	Silverchair	1	2
21.	"I Finally Found Someone"	Bryan Adams and Barbra Streisand	2	—N/a
22.	"Pony"	Ginuwine	3	—N/a
23.	"Last Night"	Az Yet	2	—N/a
24.	"Coco Jamboo"	Mr. President	7	—N/a
25.	"You Were Meant for Me"	Jewel	3	—N/a
26.	"Everybody (Backstreet's Back)"	Backstreet Boys	3	—N/a
27.	"How Come, How Long"	Babyface	5	—N/a
28.	"Everytime You Cry"	John Farnham & Human Nature	3	—N/a
29.	"One More Time"	Real McCoy	3	—N/a
30.	"When I Die"	No Mercy	2	—N/a
31.	"Hard to Say I'm Sorry"	Az Yet	5	—N/a
32.	"2 Become 1"	Spice Girls	2	—N/a
33.	"Push"	Matchbox Twenty	8	—N/a
34.	"Un-Break My Heart"	Toni Braxton	6	—N/a
35.	"Your Woman"	White Town	2	—N/a
36.	"Spice Up Your Life"	Spice Girls	8	—N/a
37.	"I Say a Little Prayer"	Diana King	6	—N/a
38.	"When Doves Cry"	Quindon Tarver	3	—N/a
39.	"Alone"	Bee Gees	7	—N/a
40.	"As Long as You Love Me"	Backstreet Boys	2	—N/a
41.	"Burn"	Tina Arena	2	—N/a
42.	"Song 2"	Blur	4	—N/a
43.	"Twisted"	Keith Sweat	9	—N/a
44.	"What's Love Got to Do with It"	Warren G	2	—N/a
45.	"Say You'll Be There"	Spice Girls	12	—N/a
46.	"Tell Him"	Celine Dion	9	—N/a
47.	"Foolish Games"	Jewel	12	—N/a
48.	"(If You're Not in It for Love) I'm Outta Here!"	Shania Twain	5	—N/a
49.	"You Sexy Thing"	T.Shirt	6	—N/a
50.	"Honey"	Mariah Carey	8	—N/a
51.	"Mo Money Mo Problems"	The Notorious B.I.G.	10	—N/a
52.	"Lovefool"	The Cardigans	11	—N/a
53.	"C U When U Get There"	Coolio	7	—N/a
54.	"Even When I'm Sleeping"	Leonardo's Bride	4	—N/a
55.	"Break Me Shake Me"	Savage Garden	7	—N/a
56.	"Don't Cry for Me Argentina"	Madonna	9	—N/a
57.	"Don't Say Goodbye"	Human Nature	8	—N/a
58.	"I Shot the Sheriff"	Warren G	8	—N/a
59.	"Semi-Charmed Life"	Third Eye Blind	8	—N/a
60.	"One Headlight"	The Wallflowers	14	—N/a
61.	"Wannabe"	Spice Girls	1	9
62.	"Bitter Sweet Symphony"	The Verve	11	—N/a
63.	"No Diggity"	Blackstreet	21	—N/a
64.	"Walkin' on the Sun"	Smash Mouth	7	—N/a
65.	"Professional Widow"	Tori Amos	17	—N/a
66.	"Secret Garden"	Bruce Springsteen	9	—N/a
67.	"Step by Step"	Whitney Houston	12	—N/a
68.	"Young Hearts Run Free"	Kym Mazelle	11	—N/a
69.	"I Need You"	3T	17	—N/a
70.	"Around the World"	Daft Punk	11	—N/a
71.	"Remember Me"	Blue Boy	17	—N/a
72.	"Abuse Me"	Silverchair	9	—N/a
73.	"The Memory Remains"	Metallica	6	—N/a
74.	"Got 'til It's Gone"	Janet Jackson	10	—N/a
75.	"Fire Water Burn"	Bloodhound Gang	13	—N/a
76.	"Blood on the Dance Floor"	Michael Jackson	5	—N/a
77.	"Cemetery"	Silverchair	5	—N/a
78.	"All I Wanna Do"	Dannii	11	—N/a
79.	"Ashes to Ashes"	Faith No More	8	—N/a
80.	"I Am, I Feel"	Alisha's Attic	18	—N/a
81.	"Macarena Christmas"	Los del Río	5	—N/a
82.	"Where Do You Go"	No Mercy	2	—N/a
83.	"Love Rollercoaster"	Red Hot Chili Peppers	19	—N/a
84.	"Sunday Morning"	No Doubt	21	—N/a
85.	"Gimme Gimme"	Whigfield	14	—N/a
86.	"Gone Away"	The Offspring	16	—N/a
87.	"Insomnia"	Faithless	16	—N/a
88.	"If You Could Only See"	Tonic	20	—N/a
89.	"The Beautiful People"	Marilyn Manson	42	—N/a
90.	"The End Is the Beginning Is the End"	The Smashing Pumpkins	10	—N/a
91.	"4 Seasons of Loneliness"	Boyz II Men	13	—N/a
92.	"Nightmare"	Brainbug	14	—N/a
93.	"Runnin'"	2Pac & The Notorious B.I.G.	12	—N/a
94.	"Wishes"	Human Nature	6	—N/a
95.	"Mama / Who Do You Think You Are"	Spice Girls	13	—N/a
96.	"Together Again"	Janet Jackson	4	—N/a
97.	"Discothèque"	U2	3	—N/a
98.	"Calypso"	Spiderbait	13	—N/a
99.	"Forever"	Damage	13	—N/a
100.	"C'mon N' Ride It (The Train)"	Quad City DJ's	13	—N/a

Peak chart positions from 1997 are from the ARIA Charts, overall position on the End of Year Chart is calculated by ARIA based on the number of weeks and position that the song reached within the Top 50 singles for each week during 1997.
