= List of top 25 albums for 1996 in Australia =

Top 25 albums of 1996 < 1995 1997 >

Other Australian top charts for 1996
- top 25 singles
- Triple J Hottest 100

Australian number-one charts of 1996
- albums
- singles

The following lists the top 50 albums of 1996 in Australia from the Australian Recording Industry Association (ARIA) End of Year Albums Chart.

#	Title	Artist	Highest pos. reached	Weeks at No. 1
1.	Jagged Little Pill	Alanis Morissette	1	10 (Note: Jagged Little Pill entered the chart in August, 1995 but didn't peak at #1 until March, 1996.)
2.	Falling into You	Celine Dion	1	4
3.	Forgiven, Not Forgotten	The Corrs	1	3
4.	(What's the Story) Morning Glory?	Oasis	1	5 (Note: Morning Glory entered the chart in October, 1995 but didn't peak at #1 until February, 1996.)
5.	The Very Best of Toni Childs	Toni Childs	1	6
6.	Recurring Dream	Crowded House	1	8 (Note: Recurring Dream debuted at #1 in July, 1995 and peaked again at #1 in December, 1996 - January, 1997.)
7.	The Presidents of the United States of America	The Presidents of the United States of America	3	(Note: Presidents of the United States of America entered the chart in November, 1995 but didn't peak until February, 1996.)
8.	Throwing Copper	Live	1	7 (Note: Throwing Copper entered the chart in September, 1994, peaking at #1 in August, 1995 and again in January, 1996.)
9.	Daydream	Mariah Carey	1	1 (Note: Daydream debuted at #1 in October, 1995 and remained in the charts until August, 1996.)
10.	Romeo's Heart	John Farnham	2	
11.	The Memory of Trees	Enya	1	2 (Note: The Memory of Trees peaked at #1 in December, 1995 and remained in the charts until September, 1996.)
12.	Barnes Hits Anthology	Jimmy Barnes	1	1
13.	HIStory: Past, Present and Future, Book I	Michael Jackson	1	3 (Note: HIStory debuted at #1 in July, 1995 and peaked again at #1 in December, 1996.))
14.	Mellon Collie and the Infinite Sadness	The Smashing Pumpkins	1	2 (Note: Mellon Collie and the Infinite Sadness debuted at #1 in November, 1995 and remained in the charts until April, 1997.)
15.	Older	George Michael	1	1
16.	Riverdance	Bill Whelan	4	
17.	New Beginning	Tracy Chapman	6	
18.	Sixteen Stone	Bush	5	
19.	Don't Ask	Tina Arena	1	1 (Note: Don't Ask entered the charts in November, 1994, peaked at #1 in November, 1995 and remained in the charts until July, 1996.)
20.	Tennessee Moon	Neil Diamond	2	
21.	Load	Metallica	1	2
22.	The Colour of My Love	Celine Dion	1	8 (Note: The Colour of My Love entered the charts in March, 1994, peaked at #1 in 1995 and remained in the charts until April, 1996.)
23.	To the Faithful Departed	The Cranberries	1	1
24.	Blue	LeAnn Rimes	5	
25.	18 til I Die	Bryan Adams	2	
26.	No Code	Pearl Jam	1	2
27.	Garbage	Garbage	4	
28.	Something to Remember	Madonna	1	1
29.	From the Muddy Banks of the Wishkah	Nirvana	1	1
30.	Greatest Hits (1985–1995)	Michael Bolton	6	
31.	CrazySexyCool	TLC	5	
32.	Greatest Hits	Simply Red	4	
33.	Enzso	Enzso	4	
34.	One Hot Minute	Red Hot Chili Peppers	1	2
35.	Don't Bore Us, Get to the Chorus!	Roxette	10	
36.	Frogstomp	Silverchair	1	3
37.	II	The Presidents of the United States of America	3	
38.	The Score	Fugees	5	
39.	All Time Greatest Hits	Elvis Presley	7	
40.	Cracked Rear View	Hootie & the Blowfish	7	
41.	Life	Simply Red	7	
42.	The Greatest Hits: 1966–1992	Neil Diamond	1	2
43.	Sweet Dreams	La Bouche	10	
44.	Double Allergic	Powderfinger	4	
45.	Sparkle and Fade	Everclear	9	
46.	Songs in the Key of X: Music from and Inspired by the X-Files	Soundtrack	8	
47.	Love Songs	Elton John	7	
48.	MTV Unplugged in New York	Nirvana	1	3
49.	Nevermind	Nirvana	2	
50.	The Very Best of the Eagles	Eagles	2	

Peak chart positions from 1996 are from the ARIA Charts, overall position on the End of Year Chart is calculated by ARIA based on the number of weeks and position that the records reach within the Top 50 albums for each week during 1996.
