= List of top 25 albums for 1997 in Australia =

Top 25 albums of 1997 < 1996 1998 >

Other Australian top charts for 1997
- top 25 singles
- Triple J Hottest 100

Australian number-one charts of 1997
- albums
- singles

The following lists the top 100 albums of 1997 in Australia from the Australian Recording Industry Association (ARIA) End of Year Albums Chart.

#	Title	Artist	Highest pos. reached	Weeks at No. 1
1.	Savage Garden	Savage Garden	1	19
2.	Romeo + Juliet	Soundtrack	1	9
3.	Middle of Nowhere	Hanson	1	2
4.	Spice	Spice Girls	3	
5.	Let's Talk About Love	Celine Dion	1	5 (Note: Let's Talk About Love debuted at #1 in November, 1997 and again in January, 1998)
6.	Tragic Kingdom	No Doubt	3	
7.	Pieces of You	Jewel	5	
8.	In Deep	Tina Arena	1	3
9.	Falling into You	Celine Dion	1	4 (Note: Falling into You debuted at #1 in March 1996 and again in July, 1996 remaining in the charts until November, 1997)
10.	Songs from the South	Paul Kelly	2	
11.	Telling Everybody	Human Nature	7	
12.	Secret Samadhi	Live	2	
13.	Anthology 1: Greatest Hits 1986-1997	John Farnham	1	1
14.	Freak Show	Silverchair	1	1
15.	Spiceworld	Spice Girls	2	
16.	Diana, Princess of Wales: Tribute	Various Artists		
17.	Bill Lawry... This Is Your Life	The Twelfth Man	1	2
18.	Forgiven, Not Forgotten	The Corrs	1	3 (Note: Forgiven, Not Forgotten entered the charts in March, 1996 and reached #1 in August, 1996 and again in September, 1996 remaining in the charts until March, 1998)
19.	My Best Friend's Wedding	Soundtrack	1	4
20.	Ixnay on the Hombre	The Offspring	2	
21.	Still Waters	Bee Gees	4	
22.	Recurring Dream	Crowded House	1	8 (Note: Recurring Dream debuted at #1 in July, 1996 and again in December, 1996 through to January 1997 remaining in the charts until October, 1997)
23.	The Fat of the Land	The Prodigy	1	1
24.	My Promise (Note: My Promise was released in the United States as No Mercy but was retitled for its Australian release)	No Mercy	4	
25.	Snowed In	Hanson	3	
26.	Jagged Little Pill	Alanis Morissette	1	10
27.	Butterfly	Mariah Carey	1	1
28.	20,000 Watt R.S.L.	Midnight Oil	1	1
29.	Album of the Year	Faith No More	1	1
30.	Song Review: A Greatest Hits Collection	Stevie Wonder	4	
31.	The Dance	Fleetwood Mac	4	
32.	Reload	Metallica	2	
33.	The Full Monty	Soundtrack	3	
34.	Talk on Corners	The Corrs	3	
35.	The Ultimate Collection	Creedence Clearwater Revival	10	
36.	Secrets	Toni Braxton	11	
37.	Ivy and the Big Apples	Spiderbait	3	
38.	Blue Moon Swamp	John Fogerty	8	
39.	Pop	U2	1	1
40.	Yourself or Someone Like You	Matchbox Twenty	1	6
41.	Paint the Sky with Stars	Enya	10	
42.	The Velvet Rope	Janet Jackson	4	
43.	Aquarium	Aqua	1	2
44.	Romeo + Juliet Volume 2	Soundtrack	2	
45.	Men in Black: The Album	Soundtrack	4	
46.	Drag	k.d. lang	4	
47.	Travelling Without Moving	Jamiroquai	6	
48.	Greatest Hits	Simply Red	4	
49.	Evita	Soundtrack	5	
50.	Led Zeppelin Remasters	Led Zeppelin	1	1
51.	Future Road	The Seekers	4	
52.	The Best That I Could Do 1978–1988	John Mellencamp	5	
53.	Double Allergic	Powderfinger	4	
54.	Ænima	Tool	6	
55.	Throwing Copper	Live	1	7
56.	Anthology 2: Classic Hits 1967–1985 (Recorded Live)	John Farnham	12	
57.	Be Here Now	Oasis	1	1
58.	Pipe Dream	John Williamson	6	
59.	You Light Up My Life: Inspirational Songs	LeAnn Rimes	12	
60.	The Woman in Me	Shania Twain	17	
61.	The Big Picture	Elton John	5	
62.	18 til I Die	Bryan Adams	2	
63.	Barnes Hits Anthology	Jimmy Barnes	1	1
64.	Music for the Jilted Generation	The Prodigy	9	
65.	Blood on the Dance Floor: HIStory in the Mix	Michael Jackson	2	
66.	HIStory: Past, Present and Future, Book I	Michael Jackson	1	3
67.	The Wiggles Movie Soundtrack	Soundtrack	36	
68.	Backstreet Boys	Backstreet Boys	6	
69.	Fashion Nugget	Cake	9	
70.	Urban Hymns	The Verve	9	
71.	Unchained Melody: The Early Years	LeAnn Rimes	4	
72.	OK Computer	Radiohead	7	
73.	Butterfly Kisses (Shades of Grace)	Bob Carlisle	10	
74.	Something for Everybody (Baz Luhrmann album)	Baz Luhrmann	14	
75.	Songs in the Key of Springfield	The Simpsons	26	
76.	Az Yet	Az Yet	24	
77.	Higher Ground	Barbra Streisand	14	
78.	The Very Best of Sting & The Police	Sting & The Police	22	
79.	All Time Greatest Hits	Elvis Presley	7	
80.	The Colour and the Shape	Foo Fighters	5	
81.	Bringing Down the Horse	The Wallflowers	9	
82.	Amanda Marshall	Amanda Marshall	15	
83.	The Day	Babyface	14	
84.	Blur	Blur	22	
85.	The Very Best of the Bee Gees	Bee Gees	7	
86.	Greatest Hits Volume III	Billy Joel	12	
87.	Anthology 3: Rarities	John Farnham	20	
88.	Forrest Gump	Soundtrack	1	3
89.	Destination Anywhere	Jon Bon Jovi	4	
90.	Blue	LeAnn Rimes	5	
91.	Evolution	Boyz II Men	6	
92.	Unplugged	Bryan Adams	28	
93.	Unit	Regurgitator	4	
94.	Guide to Better Living	Grinspoon	11	
95.	Spawn: The Album	Soundtrack	15	
96.	Angel Blood	Leonardo's Bride	25	
97.	Eternal Nightcap	The Whitlams	14	
98.	Tango	Julio Iglesias	16	
99.	No Way Out	Puff Daddy	17	
100.	December Moon	Tania Kernaghan	30	

Peak chart positions from 1997 are from the ARIA Charts, overall position on the End of Year Chart is calculated by ARIA based on the number of weeks and position that the records reach within the Top 50 albums for each week during 1997.
