= Human Nature discography =

- Studio albums: 13
- Extended plays: 1
- Compilation albums: 3
- Singles: 23
- Video albums: 5
- Music videos: 32

Australian pop vocal group Human Nature has released thirteen studio albums, three compilation albums, five video albums, one extended play (EP), twenty-three singles and thirty-two music videos.

== Albums ==
=== Studio albums ===
List of studio albums, with selected chart positions and certifications
Title	Album details	Peak chart positions			Certifications
Title	Album details	AUS	GER	NZ	Certifications
Telling Everybody	Released: 29 November 1996; Label: Sony, Columbia; Formats: CD, cassette, digital download	7	82	—	ARIA: 4× Platinum
Counting Down	Released: 14 May 1999; Label: Sony, Columbia; Formats: CD, cassette, digital download	1	—	—	ARIA: Platinum
Human Nature	Released: 1 December 2000; Label: Sony, Columbia; Formats: CD, cassette, digital download	7	—	—	ARIA: Platinum
Walk the Tightrope	Released: 23 April 2004; Label: Sony, Columbia; Formats: CD, cassette digital download	12	—	—	ARIA: Gold
Reach Out: The Motown Record	Released: 6 November 2005; Label: Sony BMG, Columbia; Formats: CD, digital download	1	—	2	ARIA: 6× Platinum; RMNZ: Gold
Dancing in the Street: The Songs of Motown II	Released: 14 October 2006; Label: Sony BMG, Columbia; Formats: CD, digital download	1	—	—	ARIA: 4× Platinum
Get Ready	Released: 17 November 2007; Label: Sony BMG, Columbia; Formats: CD, digital download	2	—	—	ARIA: Platinum
A Symphony of Hits	Released: 8 November 2008; Label: Sony BMG, Columbia; Formats: CD, digital download	10	—	—	ARIA: Platinum
Vegas: Songs from Sin City	Released: 12 November 2010; Label: Sony; Formats: CD, digital download	21	—	—	ARIA: Gold
The Christmas Album	Released: 8 November 2013; Label: Sony; Formats: CD, digital download	4	—	—	ARIA: 2× Platinum
Jukebox	Released: 24 October 2014; Label: Sony; Formats: CD, digital download	2	—	—	ARIA: 2× Platinum
Gimme Some Lovin': Jukebox Vol II	Released: 22 July 2016; Label: Sony; Formats: CD, digital download	1	—	—	ARIA: Gold
Romance of the Jukebox	Released: 17 August 2018; Label: Sony; Formats: CD, digital download, streaming	2	—	—	
"—" denotes releases that did not chart or were not released in that country.

=== Compilation albums ===
List of compilation albums, with selected chart positions and certifications
Title	Album details	Peak chart positions		Certifications
Title	Album details	AUS	NZ	Certifications
Here & Now: The Best of Human Nature	Released: 16 November 2001; Label: Sony, Columbia; Formats: CD, cassette, digital download	11	—	ARIA: Platinum
The Essential Human Nature	Released: 19 November 2010; Label: Sony, Columbia; Formats: CD	—	—	
Still Telling Everybody: 30 Years of Hits	Released: 22 November 2019; Label: Sony; Formats: CD, digital download, streaming	3	—	
"—" denotes releases that did not chart or were not released in that country.

=== Box sets ===
List of box sets, with selected chart positions
Title	Album details	Peak chart positions
Title	Album details	AUS
The Motor City Collection	Released: 19 April 2008; Label: Sony BMG, Columbia; Formats: CD/DVD	18

== Extended plays ==
List of EPs
Title	EP details
Good Good Life	Released: 4 June 2021; Label: Sony; Formats: CD, digital download, streaming

== Singles ==
List of singles, with selected chart positions and certifications
Title	Year	Peak chart positions			Certifications	Album
Title	Year	AUS	NZ	UK	Certifications	Album
"Got It Goin' On"	1996	19	30	—		Telling Everybody
"Tellin' Everybody"	1996	30	—	—		Telling Everybody
"Wishes"	1997	6	—	44	ARIA: Platinum	Telling Everybody
"Don't Say Goodbye"	1997	8	—	—	ARIA: Gold	Telling Everybody
"Whisper Your Name"	1997	18	—	53		Telling Everybody
"Everytime You Cry" (with John Farnham)	1997	3	—	—	ARIA: Platinum	Anthology 1: Greatest Hits; 1986–1997 and Counting Down
"People Get Ready"	1997	35	—	—		Telling Everybody
"Cruel"	1998	14	—	—	ARIA: Gold	Counting Down
"Last to Know"	1999	14	—	—	ARIA: Gold	Counting Down
"Don't Cry"	1999	5	—	—	ARIA: Gold	Counting Down
"Eternal Flame / Shake You Outta My Head"	1999	8	—	—	ARIA: Gold	Counting Down
"Be There with You"	2000	40	—	—		Counting Down
"He Don't Love You"	2000	4	—	18	ARIA: Platinum	Human Nature
"When We Were Young"	2001	21	—	43		Human Nature
"Don't Come Back"	2001	46	—	—		Human Nature
"Always Be with You"	2001	29	—	—		Here & Now: The Best of Human Nature
"When You Say You Love Me"	2004	7	—	—	ARIA: Gold	Walk the Tightrope
"Guilty (One in a Million)" (featuring Kelly K.A.E.)	2004	33	—	—		Walk the Tightrope
"Uptight (Everything's Alright)"	2007	—	—	—		Dancing in the Street: The Songs of Motown II
"Little More Love"	2018	—	—	—		Romance of the Jukebox
"Nobody Just Like You"	2020	— (Note: "Nobody Just Like You" did not enter the ARIA Top 100 Singles Chart, but peaked at number 28 on the ARIA Digital Track Chart.)	—	—		Good Good Life
"Broken Humans" (with Guy Sebastian)	2021	— (Note: "Broken Humans" did not enter the ARIA Top 100 Singles Chart, but peaked at number 31 on the ARIA Digital Track Chart.)	—	—		Good Good Life
"Upside Down"	2025	—	—	—		Non-album single
"—" denotes releases that did not chart or were not released in that country.

== Music videos ==
Year	Single	Director
1996	"Got It Goin' On"	
1996	"Tellin' Everybody"	
1996	"Wishes"	
1997	"Don't Say Goodbye"	Ross Wood
1997	"People Get Ready"	
1997	"Whisper Your Name"	
1997	"Everytime You Cry"	Mark Hartley
1998	"Cruel"	Mark Hartley
1999	"Last to Know"	Mark Hartley
1999	"Don't Cry"	Mark Hartley
1999	"Eternal Flame"	Mark Hartley
2000	"Be There with You"	
2000	"He Don't Love You"	
2001	"When We Were Young"	Anthony Rose
2001	"Don't Come Back"	
2001	"Always Be with You"	
2004	"When You Say You Love Me"	
2004	"Guilty"	
2005	"Reach Out I'll Be There"	
2006	"Dancing in the Street"	
2006	"Uptight (Everything's Alright)"	
2007	"Baby I Need Your Loving"	
2007	"Get Ready"	
2008	"People Get Ready"	
2013	"Christmas (Baby Please Come Home)"	
2013	"Santa Claus Is Coming to Town"	
2013	"Winter Wonderland"	
2013	"Have Yourself a Merry Little Christmas"	
2013	"Silent Night"	
2013	"White Christmas"	
2014	"Runaround Sue"	
2014	"Will You Love Me Tomorrow"	
2015	"Let it Snow, Let it Snow, Let it Snow"	
2016	"Gimme Some Lovin'"	
2016	"Be My Baby"	
2016	"Forgive Me Now"	
2018	"Love Train"	
2018	"Little More Love"	
2021	"Broken Humans" (with Guy Sebastian)	

== Video albums ==
Title	Details	Certification
Telling Everybody... The Story	Released: 1997; Label: Columbia	
Here & Now: The Best of Human Nature	Released: 2001; Label: Columbia	
Reach Out: The Motown Record	Released: 2006; Label: Columbia	
Reach Out: Live at the Capitol	Released: 2007; Label: Columbia	ARIA: 2× Platinum
Human Nature Sings Motown (With Special Guest Smokey Robinson)	Released: 6 March 2012; Label: UMe	
