= Still Telling Everybody: 30 Years of Hits =

Greatest hits album by Human Nature.
- Released: 22 November 2019
- Recorded: 1996–2019
- Length: 97:47
- Label: Sony

Human Nature. chronology
Romance of the Jukebox (2018)	Still Telling Everybody: 30 Years of Hits (2019)

Still Telling Everybody: 30 Years of Hits is a greatest hits album by Australian vocal group Human Nature. The album was released in November 2019 to coincide with the group's induction into the ARIA Hall of Fame. Still Telling Everybody: 30 Years of Hits peaked at number 3 on the ARIA Charts.

== Background and release ==
Human Nature started as the 4 Trax in Sydney in late 1989 and signed with Sony before changing their name to Human Nature in 1995. In March 1996, Human Nature released their debut single "Got It Goin' On" which peaked at number 19 on the ARIA Singles Chart. Since then, Human Nature have released 13 studio albums, 4 of which have peaked at number 1 in Australia, and 15 top 20 singles. In Australia, the group have album sales in excess of 2.5 million units.

In early 2019, Human Nature were awarded the Medal of the Order of Australia (OAM) for their service to the performing arts and entertainment field. In November 2019, the group were announced as the ARIA Hall of Fame inductees at the ARIA Music Awards of 2019.

== Track listing ==
CD1

No.	Title	Writer(s)	Album	Length
1.	"Don't Say Goodbye" (reimagined version)	Paul Begaud; Andrew Tierney; Michael Tierney	new recording, original on Telling Everybody	3:29
2.	"Tellin' Everybody"	Begaud; A. Tierney; M. Tierney	Telling Everybody	4:03
3.	"Wishes"	Alan Glass; Andrew Klippel	Telling Everybody	4:05
4.	"Everytime You Cry" (with John Farnham)	Gregg Sutton; Shelly Peiken	Counting Down	4:45
5.	"Cruel"	Klippel; Shep Solomon	Counting Down	5:17
6.	"Last to Know"	Steve Kipner; Dane Deviller; Sean Hosein	Counting Down	4:27
7.	"Don't Cry"	Klippel; Glass	Counting Down	4:01
8.	"Eternal Flame"	Susanna Hoffs; Tom Kelly; Billy Steinberg	Counting Down	3:19
9.	"He Don't Love You"	Steve Mac; Wayne Hector	Human Nature	3:11
10.	"When You Say You Love Me"	Darren Hayes; Rick Nowels	Walk the Tightrope	4:00
11.	"Always Be with You"	Kevin Spencer; Leon Foster Sylvers; A. Tierney; M. Tierney	Here & Now: The Best of Human Nature	3:47
12.	"Little More Love"		Romance of the Jukebox	3:16
13.	"People Get Ready"	Curtis Mayfield	Telling Everybody	4:20

CD2

No.	Title	Writer(s)	Album	Length
1.	"This Old Heart of Mine" (30th Anniversary version)	Holland–Dozier–Holland; Sylvia Moy	new recording	3:10
2.	"Reach Out I'll Be There"	Brian Holland, Lamont Dozier, Edward Holland, Jr.	Reach Out: The Motown Record	3:14
3.	"Baby I Need Your Loving"	Holland; Dozier; Holland	Reach Out: The Motown Record	3:09
4.	"Ain't No Mountain High Enough"	Nickolas Ashford, Valerie Simpson)	Dancing in the Street: The Songs of Motown II	2:45
5.	"Uptight (Everything's Alright)"	Stevie Wonder; Sylvia Moy; Henry Cosby	Dancing in the Street: The Songs of Motown II	3:11
6.	"Ooo Baby Baby"	Smokey Robinson; Warren "Pete" Moore	Get Ready	2:44
7.	"Runaround Sue"	Dion DiMucci; Ernie Maresca	Jukebox	2:56
8.	"Will You Love Me Tomorrow"	Gerry Goffin; Carole King	Jukebox	2:48
9.	"Gimme Some Lovin'"	Steve Winwood; Spencer Davis; Muff Winwood	Gimme Some Lovin': Jukebox Vol II	3:07
10.	"Be My Baby"	Jeff Barry; Ellie Greenwich; Phil Spector	Gimme Some Lovin': Jukebox Vol II	3:30
11.	"Love Train"	Kenny Gamble; Leon Huff	Romance of the Jukebox	2:43
12.	"Bridge Over Troubled Water"	Paul Simon	Romance of the Jukebox	3:45
13.	"White Christmas"	Irving Berlin	The Christmas Album	2:53
14.	"Please Come Home for Christmas"	Charles Brown; Gene Redd	The Christmas Album	2:49
15.	"Let It Snow! Let It Snow! Let It Snow!" (featuring Delta Goodrem)	Sammy Cahn; Jule Styne	The Christmas Album	3:03

== Charts ==
=== Weekly charts ===
Chart (2019)	Peak position
Australian Albums (ARIA)	3

=== Year-end charts ===
Chart (2019)	Position
Australian Artist Albums (ARIA)	37

== Release history ==
Region	Date	Format	Label	Catalogue
Australia	22 November 2019	2xCD; digital download; streaming	Sony Music Australia	19439707222
