= Gimme Some Lovin': Jukebox Vol II =

Studio album by Human Nature
- Released: 22 July 2016
- Genre: Doo-wop, traditional pop
- Label: Sony

Human Nature chronology
Jukebox (2014)	Gimme Some Lovin': Jukebox Vol II (2016)	Romance of the Jukebox (2018)

Gimme Some Lovin': Jukebox Vol II is the twelfth studio album by Australian pop vocal group Human Nature, released on 22 July 2016. The album was announced on 29 April 2016. The album debuted at number one on the ARIA charts, becoming the band's fourth in Australia and first since Dancing in the Street: The Songs of Motown II in October 2006.

The album was re-released on 4 November 2016 as the Australian Tour Edition. This came with a bonus DVD of 29 greatest hits video clips, spanning the group's entire career.

== Background and release ==
In 2014, Human Nature released Jukebox; an album of 1950s and 60s pop standards. The album peaked at number 2 on the ARIA Charts and was certified platinum. Gimme Some Lovin' is the follow-up to Jukebox.

Promotional videos were released for "Gimme Some Lovin'", "Be My Baby" and "Forgive Me Now" throughout July 2016.

== Review ==
Jessica Mule from Renowned for Sound gave the album 3 stars out of 5 saying; "Human Nature had a mission. And that mission was to recreate and cover the perfect old school jukebox playlist for the second time round" but at time pondered if she'd heard them do these songs before. Mule complemented on the sole original track on the album, "Forgive Me Now" saying it's "An echoed plea of apology, with quite a beautiful tone and build up, starting with an acoustic plucked guitar and vocal, before adding in the background harmonies, drums, and strings. It just goes to remind us that Human Nature can perform more than just covers.

== Track listing ==
No.	Title	Writer(s)	Length
1.	"Gimme Some Lovin'"	Steve Winwood, Spencer Davis, Muff Winwood	3:46
2.	"Be My Baby"	Jeff Barry, Ellie Greenwich, Phil Spector	3:28
3.	"Then She Kissed Me"	Jeff Barry, Ellie Greenwich, Phil Spector	2:54
4.	"Why Do Fools Fall In Love"	Frankie Lymon, Herman Santiago, Jimmy Merchant	3:40
5.	"You've Lost That Lovin' Feelin'"	Phil Spector, Barry Mann, Cynthia Weil	4:03
6.	"Rescue Me"		3:53
7.	"(Your Love Keeps Lifting Me) Higher and Higher"	Gary Jackson, Carl Smith	4:18
8.	"You Send Me"	Sam Cooke	3:04
9.	"Forgive Me Now"		5:00
10.	"Twistin' the Night Away"	Sam Cooke	2:48
11.	"Save the Last Dance for Me"	Doc Pomus, Mort Shuman	4:30
12.	"I Saw Her Standing There"	Paul McCartney John Lennon	2:44
13.	"Don't Worry Baby"	Brian Wilson, Roger Christian	3:36
14.	"At Last"	Mack Gordon, Harry Warren	4:42
15.	"Shout"		3:26

Australian Tour Edition DVD
No.	Title	Length
1.	"Got it Goin' On" (Music video)
2.	"Tellin' Everybody" (Music video)
3.	"Wishes" (Music video)
4.	"Don't Say Goodbye" (Music video)
5.	"Whisper Your Name" (Music video)
6.	"Everytime You Cry" (Music video)
7.	"People Get Ready" (Music video)
8.	"Cruel" (Music video)
9.	"Last to Know" (Music video)
10.	"Don't Cry" (Music video)
11.	"Eternal Flame" (Music video)
12.	"Be There With You" (Music video)
13.	"He Don't Love You" (Music video)
14.	"When We Were Young" (Music video)
15.	"Don't Come Back" (Music video)
16.	"Always Be With You" (Music video)
17.	"When You Say You Love Me" (Music video)
18.	"Guilty (One In A Million)" (Music video)
19.	"Reach Out I'll Be There" (Music video)
20.	"Baby I Need Your Loving" (Music video)
21.	"Uptight (Everything's Alright)" (Music video)
22.	"Dancing in the Street" (Music video)
23.	"Runaround Sue" (Music video)
24.	"Will You Love Me Tomorrow" (Music video)
25.	"Gimme Some Lovin'" (Music video)
26.	"Forgive Me Now" (Music video)
27.	"Be My Baby" (Music video)
28.	"White Christmas" (Music video)
29.	"Let It Snow! Let It Snow! Let It Snow! (with Delta Goodrem)" (Music video)

== Charts ==
=== Weekly charts ===
Chart (2016)	Peak position
Australian Albums (ARIA)	1

=== Year-end charts ===
Chart (2016)	Position
Australian Albums (ARIA)	25

== Certifications ==
Region	Certification	Certified units/sales
Australia (ARIA)	Gold	35,000^{^}
^{^} Shipments figures based on certification alone.

== Release history ==
Region	Date	Format	Edition(s)	Label	Catalogue
Australia	22 July 2016	CD; digital download	Standard	Sony Music Australia	88985338142
Australia	4 November 2016	CD / DVD	Tour Edition	Sony Music Australia	88985387562

== See also ==
- List of number-one albums of 2016 (Australia)
- List of top 25 albums for 2016 in Australia
