= Here & Now: The Best of Human Nature =

Greatest hits album by Human Nature
- Released: 16 November 2001
- Recorded: 1996–2001
- Genre: Pop
- Label: Sony/Columbia
- Producer: Andrew Klippel, Paul Begaud

Human Nature chronology
Human Nature (2000)	Here & Now: The Best of Human Nature (2001)	Walk the Tightrope (2004)

Singles from Here & Now: The Best of Human Nature
- 1. "Always Be with You" Released: November 2001

Here & Now: The Best of Human Nature is a greatest hits album by Australian vocal group Human Nature released on 16 November 2001.

== Track listing ==
1. "Always Be with You"
2. "Don't Cry"
3. "Got It Goin' On"
4. "He Don't Love You"
5. "Wishes"
6. "Whisper Your Name"
7. "Don't Say Goodbye"
8. "Shout"
9. "Cruel"
10. "Last to Know"
11. "Everytime You Cry" (with John Farnham)
12. "Be There with You"
13. "Eternal Flame"
14. "When We Were Young"
15. "Tellin' Everybody"
16. "People Get Ready"
17. "Sign Your Name"

== Charts ==
=== Weekly charts ===
Chart (2001/02)	Peak position
Australian Albums (ARIA)	11

=== Year-end chart ===
Chart (2001)	Position
Australian Albums (ARIA)	91
Chart (2002)	Position
Australian Albums (ARIA)	78

== Certifications ==
Region	Certification	Certified units/sales
Australia (ARIA)	Platinum	70,000^{^}
^{^} Shipments figures based on certification alone.
