= A Symphony of Hits =

Studio album by Human Nature
- Released: 8 November 2008
- Recorded: 2008
- Genre: Pop
- Length: 54:25
- Label: Sony, Columbia
- Producer: Eliot Kennedy

Human Nature chronology
The Motor City Collection (2008)	A Symphony of Hits (2008)	Vegas: Songs from Sin City (2010)

A Symphony of Hits is the eighth studio album by Australian pop vocal group Human Nature. The album includes reworking of some of their past hits and several new cover versions all with arrangements by Prague Philharmonic Orchestra. Australian superstar Darren Hayes is featured on "When You Say You Love Me", a re-working of the group's 2004 hit which Hayes wrote.

To celebrate the release of the album Human Nature performed the brand new versions of their multi-platinum hits with the Sydney Symphony Orchestra at Sydney Opera House on 12 and 13 December conducted by Guy Noble.

They then performed in February 2009 with the Melbourne Symphony Orchestra and the West Australian Symphony Orchestra.

== Track listing ==
1. "People Get Ready" (Curtis Mayfield) 4:22
2. "Everytime You Cry" (Peiken, Sutton) 4:22
3. "Wishes" (Alan Glass, Andrew Klippel) 4:14
4. "All Out of Love" (Graham Russell, Clive Davis) 4:04
5. "Got to Get You into My Life" (John Lennon, Paul McCartney) 2:36
6. "She's Leaving Home" (John Lennon, Paul McCartney) 3:36
7. "Eternal Flame" (Susanna Hoffs, Tom Kelly, Billy Steinberg) 3:16
8. "When You Say You Love Me" (Darren Hayes, Rick Nowels) 4:27
9. "Don't Say Goodbye" (Andrew Tierney, Paul Begaud, Michael Tierney) 4:21
10. "Reach Out (I'll Be There)" (Lamont Dozier, Brian Holland, Edward Holland, Jr.) 3:32
11. "The Tracks of My Tears" (Pete Moore, Smokey Robinson, Marv Tarplin) 3:05
12. "Cruel" (Andrew Klippel, Shep Solomon) 4:53
13. "Danny Boy" (Frederic Weatherly) 4:14
14. "Last Christmas" (George Michael) 3:23

== Charts ==
Chart (2008)	Peak position
Australian Albums (ARIA)	10

=== Certifications ===
Region	Certification	Certified units/sales
Australia (ARIA)	Platinum	70,000^{^}
^{^} Shipments figures based on certification alone.
