= Echo Point =

- Genre: Soap opera Drama
- Written by: Pim Hendrix; Jason Herbison
- Directed by: Helen Gaynor; Steve Mann; Alan Coleman
- Starring: Jessica Napier; Melissa Tkautz; Rose Byrne; Liddy Clark; John Clayton; Louise Crawford; Victoria Nicolls; Diarmid Heidenreich; Martin Henderson; Roxane Wilson; David E Woodley
- Theme music composer: Paul Begaud; Andrew Tierney; Michael Tierney
- Country of origin: Australia
- Original language: English
- No. of seasons: 1
- No. of episodes: 130

Production
- Running time: 30 minutes
- Production company: Southern Star Group

Original release
- Network: Network Ten
- Release: 1 June – 1 December 1995

Echo Point is an Australian television soap opera produced by Southern Star Group for Network Ten on 1 June 1995 until 1 December 1995.

The series was devised as an attempt by the Ten Network to rival the opposition soap Home and Away on the Seven Network. The series focused on several families and teenagers in a coastal community, and a key on-going storyline concerned renewed interest in a long-unsolved local murder mystery.

== Production ==
In February 1995, John Burfitt of TV Week reported that production on the 26-part series was set to commence in Sydney on 3 April. The series was originally known as Bells Point and billed as "E Street meets Summer Bay". Burfitt confirmed that casting auditions were underway for "a strong teen cast, equally balanced with experienced, mature actors." The series centres on a small community in a settlement across the bay from a "thriving" metropolis. Four families – the Lomans, Brennans, Wintons, and O'Connors – provided the basis for the series, with Daniel Blake returning to the town after a long absence, following the murder of his parents. Echo Point was produced by Southern Star Productions.

== Broadcast ==
Echo Point originally aired at 7:00pm weeknights in direct competition with Home and Away to low ratings. Fewer viewers watched the show compared to the repeats of Roseanne that it replaced, while Home and Away's viewership increased. Having attracted audiences of 501,000 and 339,000 viewers for its first two episodes, Echo Point had the worst soap opera debut since Nine Network's Family and Friends in 1990. Ten soon moved the series to the 6.00pm weeknight timeslot, but ratings continued to decline. Ten then moved it to the 11.30pm graveyard slot, and after six months and 130 episodes, Echo Point ended.

The show was later sold to Germany, where it became so successful that it sparked a rumour about it being revived in Australia to help Network Ten's local drama content quota.

In the UK, only two ITV stations purchased the series. Grampian Television started screening the series from 1 September 1997 as a replacement for Paradise Beach, shown Monday to Wednesday at 17:10–17:40, until November 1997. The series reappeared in early August 1998 when it was broadcast at 10.30am each weekday, From November 1998, it was screened each weekday at 04.30am alongside Shortland Street to clear off the episodes. Central Television screened the series Tuesday to Thursday at 13:00–13:30 as the replacement for A Country Practice from Tuesday, 1 September 1998 and completed the series in June 1999.

TV3 in New Zealand picked up the series for just a few weeks in 1996, but then later cancelled the show, which featured former Shortland Street actor Martin Henderson.

== Theme song ==
"Echo Point (Theme)" also known as "Down By The Water" was written by songwriters Paul Begaud, Andrew Tierney and Michael Tierney. The Tierneys are both members of the vocal group Human Nature. "Down By The Water" was recorded by Australian singer Nick Howard and released as the B-side to his single "Who Fell In Love?" on BMG records in 1995. Begaud also produced the song. The show's producers chose the song from 140 submissions, including two from Howard himself.

== Cast ==
=== Original cast ===
- Martin Henderson as Zac Brennan, troubled man
- Jessica Napier as Edwina Amadio, Zac's girlfriend
- Kimberley Davenport as Holly Winton, nurse, dating Gordon
- Allan Lovel as Gordon Amadio, Edwina's father, local timberyard owner
- Phillip Gordon as Daniel Blake, sinister figure who possibly murdered his parents
- Roxane Wilson as Coral O'Connor, single mother, dating Hooper
- Rose Byrne as Belinda O'Connor, Coral's daughter
- Diarmid Heidenreich as Dean Loman, schoolboy
- David Woodley as Hooper Hadley, Trish's heartthrob brother
- Rebecca Murphy as Frannie Loman, Dean and Lisa's intelligent sister
- Sean Scully as Neville Loman, father of Dean, Frannie, Lisa
- Victoria Nicolls as Trish Loman, mother of Dean, Frannie, Lisa, runs the marina café
- Tom Long as Dave Campbell
- Mick Innes as Darcy Brennan
- Louise Crawford as Shelley Radcliffe, Holly's unhinged niece
- Jack Ellis as Marty Radcliffe, Holly's sensitive nephew
- Hayley Phillips as Lisa Loman, Dean and Frannie's spirited sister
- John Clayton as Maurie Barnard

=== Guests ===
- Liddy Clark as Iris Delaney
- Rowena Wallace as Elizabeth O'Connor, Coral's mother
- Scott McGregor as Clive McInery

== Reception ==
In 2020, Fiona Byrne of the Herald Sun included Echo Point in her feature about "long forgotten Australian TV dramas that made viewers switch off." Byrne stated: "Put simply the show was a flop and instead of pulling viewers away from Home and Away, the ratings of the 7 show actually increased. It was axed after one season."
