= Whisper Your Name =

Single by Human Nature

from the album Telling Everybody
- A-side: "Whisper Your Name"
- Released: July 1997
- Recorded: Studios 301, Sydney, Australia
- Genre: Pop
- Length: 3:47
- Label: Sony Music Records, Columbia Records
- Songwriter(s): Andrew Tierney, Michael Tierney
- Producer(s): Paul Begaud

Human Nature singles chronology
"Don't Say Goodbye" (1997)	"Whisper Your Name" (1997)	"Everytime You Cry" (1997)

"Whisper Your Name" is a song by Australian group Human Nature. It was released in July 1997 as the fifth single from the debut studio album Telling Everybody (1996). The song peaked at No. 18 in Australia.

== Track listing ==
CD single (664593 2)

1. "Whisper Your Name" (Radio Edit) - 3:47
2. "Wishes" (Carl McIntosh's R&B Mix)
3. "Wishes" (Carl McIntosh's Urban Alternative Mix) - 4:50

Limited Edition Australian Tour Pack CD Maxi (664593.9)

1. "Whisper Your Name" (Radio Edit) - 3:47
2. "Whisper Your Name" (Peewee Ferris's 7" Remix) - 3:25
3. "Whisper Your Name" (Peewee's Club Mix) - 5:38
4. "Whisper Your Name" (Ignorant's Master Mix) - 5:15
5. "People Get Ready" (Live In Oslo) - 2:51
6. "Stomp" (Live In Oslo) - 4:48
7. "Wishes" (Live In Oslo) - 4:03
8. "Tellin' Everybody" (Live In Oslo) - 4:03
- Tracks 5 to 8 recorded live in Oslo on the Michael Jackson Tour of Europe.

== Charts ==
=== Weekly charts ===
"Whisper Your Name" debuted at No. 47 in Australia before rising to a peak of No. 18 in October.

Chart (1997)	Peak position
Australia (ARIA)	18
UK Singles (OCC)	53
