= When We Were Young (Human Nature song) =

Single by Human Nature

from the album Human Nature
- Released: March 2001
- Recorded: Sydney, Australia
- Genre: Pop
- Length: 3:28
- Label: Sony, Columbia
- Songwriters: Andrew Tierney, Eliot Kennedy, Michael Tierney, Mike Percy, Phil Burton, Tim Lever, Tim Woodcock
- Producer: Steelworks

Human Nature singles chronology
"He Don't Love You" (2000)	"When We Were Young" (2001)	"Don't Come Back" (2001)

"When We Were Young" is a song by Australian pop band Human Nature, released in March 2001 as the second single from their third album Human Nature.

== Track listing ==
=== European single ===
1. "When We Were Young" (UK single version) – 3:28
2. "When We Were Young" (Studio 347 Radio Remix) – 3:38

=== Enhanced CD 1 ===
1. "When We Were Young" – 3:28
2. "When We Were Young" (Studio 347 Extended Remix) – 4:11
3. "Eternal Flame" (Susanna Hoffs, Tom Kelly, Billy Steinberg)
4. "When We Were Young" (video) – 3:27

=== Enhanced CD 2 ===
1. "When We Were Young" (UK single version) – 3:28
2. "When We Were Young" (Studio 347 Radio Remix) – 3:38
3. "He Don't Love You (Amen Radio Remix) – 3:33
4. "Wishes" (Alan Glass, Andrew Klippel) – 4:02
5. "When We Were Young" (video) – 3:27

=== UK Cassette single ===
1. "When We Were Young" – 3:28
2. "When We Were Young" (Studio 347 Extended Remix) – 4:11
3. "Eternal Flame"

=== 12" single ===
1. "When We Were Young" (Studio 347 Extended Remix) – 4:11
2. "When We Were Young" (Studio 347 Radio Remix) – 3:38

== Charts ==
Chart (2001)	Peak position
Australia (ARIA)	21
Scotland Singles (Official Charts)	41
UK Singles (Official Charts)	43
