= Haunted (Human Nature song) =

Single by Room 2012

from the album Elevator
- Released: 14 December 2007
- Length: 3:57
- Label: Starwatch; Warner
- Songwriters: Andrew Tierney; Michael Tierney; Vince DeGiorgio
- Producers: Hallgeir Rustan; Ronny Svendsen

Room 2012 singles chronology
"Haunted" (2007)	"Naughty But Nice" (2008)

"Haunted" is a song originally recorded by the Australian pop vocal group Human Nature for their 2004 album Walk the Tightrope. In 2007, the song was covered by the German pop quartet Room 2012 and released as the first single from their debut album, Elevator (2007). The Room 2012 version charted at number 10 in Germany, number 21 in Austria and number 23 in Switzerland.

== Track listings ==
CD single (2-track)
No.	Title	Writer(s)	Producer(s)	Length
1.	"Haunted" (radio edit)	Andrew Tierney; Michael Tierney; Vince DeGiorgio	Hallgeir Rustan; Ronny Svendsen	3:57
2.	"First Thing" (radio edit)	Geoffrey Williams; Marc Zibung; Adrian Zagoritis	Rustan; Svendsen	3:37

== Charts ==
Chart performance for "Haunted"
Chart (2007)	Peak position
Austria (Ö3 Austria Top 40)	21
Germany (GfK)	10
Switzerland (Schweizer Hitparade)	23
