= Human Nature (Human Nature album) =

Studio album by Human Nature
- Released: 1 December 2000
- Genre: Pop
- Label: Sony/Columbia
- Producers: Paul Begaud, Steelworks, Steve Mac, Carl Sturken, Evan Rogers, David Kreuger, Per Magnusson, Douglas Carr, Jörgen Elofsson

Human Nature chronology
Counting Down (1999)	Human Nature (2000)	Here & Now: The Best of Human Nature (2001)

Singles from Human Nature
- 1. "He Don't Love You" Released: November 2000; 2. "When We Were Young" Released: March 2001; 3. "Don't Come Back" Released: July 2001

Human Nature is the third studio album by Australian boy band and pop vocal group Human Nature released on 1 December 2000. The album marked a change in style for the group, from the previous smooth R&B/pop sound, to a more upbeat, electronic sound, similar to contemporaries NSYNC.

== Making of the album ==
The album was recorded just after the 2000 Summer Olympics and achieved major success all around Australia. The lead song, "He Don't Love You", was released a month earlier and was filmed at Avalon Airport. For two of their video clips, they flew to Bali (When We Were Young) and the UK (Don't Come Back).

== Track listing ==
1. "He Don't Love You" (Steve Mac, Wayne Hector) – 3:10
2. "Don't Come Back" (Andrew Tierney, Michael Tierney, Paul Begaud) – 3:20
3. "When We Were Young" (Tierney, Eliot Kennedy, Tierney, Mike Percy, Phil Burton, Tim Lever, Tim Woodcock) – 3:28
4. "It's Gonna Be a Long Night" (Tierney, Tierney, Gary Barlow) – 3:40
5. "House of Cards" (Hector, S. Ellis) – 4:22
6. "Everytime" (Paul Begaud, V. Corish) – 4:28
7. "Whisper Your Name (The Only One)" (David Kreuger, Per Magnusson, Jörgen Elofsson, Max Martin) – 3:12
8. "If I Only Had the Heart" (Tierney, Kennedy, Tierney, Percy, Burton, Toby Allen, Lever, Tim Woodcock)– 3:44
9. "Trash" (Tierney, Tierney) – 3:41
10. "Baby Come Back to Me" (Tierney, Tierney, Paul Begaud)– 3:32
11. "Angel of Your Heart" (A. Tierney, Elofsson) – 4:01
12. "Love Is a Fire" (Elofsson, M. Venge) – 3:12

== Charts ==
=== Weekly charts ===
Chart (2000/01)	Peak position
Australian Albums (ARIA)	7

=== End of Year Chart ===
Chart (2000)	Position
Australian Albums (ARIA Charts)	54

=== Certifications ===
Region	Certification	Certified units/sales
Australia (ARIA)	Platinum	70,000^{^}
^{^} Shipments figures based on certification alone.

== Credits ==
- A&r – John O'Donnell, Simon Moore
- Arranged [Additional] – Andrew Tierney (tracks: 2, 9, 10), Michael Tierney (tracks: 2, 9, 10)
- Creative Director – Yoon Kim
- Engineer – Ben Coombs (tracks: 3, 4, 8)
- Engineer [Assistant] – David O'Hagan (tracks: 3, 4, 8)
- Executive Producer – David Caplice
- Instruments [All] – Paul Begaud (tracks: 2, 6, 9, 10)
- Mastered – Tom Coyne (tracks: 1, 3 to 5, 7 to 12)
- Mixed – Bernard Löhr (tracks: 7, 11, 12), Paul Begaud (tracks: 2, 6, 9)
- Other [Choreography] – Kelley Abbey
- Producer – Paul Begaud (tracks: 2, 6, 9, 10), Steelworks (tracks: 3, 4, 8)
- Recorded – Matt Lovell (tracks: 2, 6, 9, 10), Paul Begaud (tracks: 2, 6, 9, 10)
