= Counting Down =

Studio album by Human Nature
- Released: 14 May 1999
- Recorded: 1997–1999
- Genre: Pop
- Label: Sony/Columbia
- Producers: Paul Begaud; Andrew Klippel; Human Nature; Ross Fraser; John Farnham

Human Nature chronology
Telling Everybody (1996)	Counting Down (1999)	Human Nature (2000)

Singles from Counting Down
- 1. "Cruel" Released: August 1998; 2. "Last to Know" Released: March 1999; 3. "Don't Cry" Released: June 1999; 4. "Eternal Flame" Released: October 1999; 5. "Be There with You" Released: March 2000

Counting Down is the second studio album by Australian boy band and pop vocal group Human Nature, released on 14 May 1999.

== Track listing ==
1. "Last to Know" (Steve Kipner, Sean Hosein, Dane DeViller) – 4:26
2. "Cruel" (Andrew Klippel, Shep Solomon) – 5:16
3. "Mary's Garden" (Andrew Tierney, Klippel, Michael Tierney) – 4:00
4. "Counting Down" (Tierney, Klippel, Tierney) – 3:24
5. "Don't Cry" (U.S. Radio Remix) (Klippel, Glass) – 3:59
6. "Depend on Me" (Tierney, Paul Begaud, Tierney) – 4:42
7. "Be There With You" (Tierney, Paul Begaud, Tierney) – 3:50
8. "Bring Her Back" (Klippel, Werfel, Reswick) – 4:45
9. "Send It in a Letter" (Klippel, Tierney, Toby Allen, Phil Burton, Tierney, Glass) – 3:58
10. "7 Lonely Days" (Tierney, George Merril, Tierney) – 3:54
11. "Now That I Found You" (Paul Begaud, Vanessa Corish, JD Martin) – 3:28
12. "Temperature Rising" (Klippel, Glass) – 4:29
13. "Everytime You Cry" (with John Farnham) (Peiken, Sutton) – 4:45
14. "Eternal Flame" (Susanna Hoffs, Tom Kelly, Billy Steinberg) – 3:20 / "We Can Fly Away" (hidden track) (Burton, G. Cunningham) – 3:00

=== Bonus disc tracks ===
1. "Everytime You Cry"
2. "Eternal Flame"
3. "Last to Know" (Radio Remix)
4. "Last to Know" (VV Club Remix)
5. "Cruel" (Radio Remix)

== Personnel ==
- Arrangement (additional) – Andrew Tierney (tracks: 1, 6, 7, 11), Michael Tierney (tracks: 1, 6, 7, 11), Rod Temperton (track 5)
- Arrangement (vocals) – Andrew Klippel (tracks: 1 to 5, 8 to 10, 12, 13), Human Nature (tracks: 1 to 13, 15), Phil Burton (tracks: 1 to 13, 15), Rod Temperton (track 3)
- Arrangement (strings) – Jamie Muhoberac, Larry Muhoberac (track 2)
- Design (booklet design) – Erica McIntyre
- Design (cover design) – New Moon
- Engineering (additional) – Andrew Scheps (tracks: 2, 3, 10, 12), John Paterno (tracks: 3, 5, 10, 12), Nick Brophy (track 2, 10)
- Engineering (mix) – Doug Brady (track 6)
- Guitar – Alan Kato (tracks: 3, 5, 9, 10), Peter Northcote (tracks: 1, 6, 7, 11), Shep Solomon (track 2), Christopher Bruce (track 4), Paul Begaud (track 11), Tim Pierce (track 12)
- Mastering – Vlado Meller
- Mixing – Dave Way (tracks: 1, 3, 14), David Sussman (tracks: 8 to 10, 12), Mick Guzauski (track 2, 7), Carmen Rizzo (track 4), David Hemming (track 11), Paul Begaud (track 11)
- Photography – Tony Duran
- Producer – Andrew Klippel (tracks: 2 to 5, 8 to 10, 12, 14), Paul Begaud (tracks: 1, 6, 7, 11)
- Producer (additional vocals) – Andrew Tierney, George Merrill, Michael Tierney (track 10)
- Programming – Andrew Klippel (tracks: 2 to 5, 8 to 10, 12), Paul Begaud (tracks: 1, 6, 7, 11)
- Programming (additional) – Dane DeViller, Sean Hosein, Steve Kipner (track 1)
- Recording – David Hemming (tracks: 1, 6, 7, 11, 14)
- Recording (vocals) – David Hemming (tracks: 2, 3, 5, 9, 10, 12), Arabella Rodriguez (track 4, 8)
- Synthesizer (additional) – Jamie Muhoberac (tracks: 2 to 5)
- Talkbox effects – Cameron Hanly
- Additional drums – Damien Wagner
- Additional drum programming and mixing – Angela Piva (track 5)
- "Everytime You Cry"
  - Assistant engineer – Aaron Humphries
  - Producer – John Farnham, Ross Fraser
  - Producer [Human Nature vocals] – Andrew Klippel
  - Mixing – Doug Brady
  - Vocals – John Farnham
  - Vocal engineer – Arabella Rodriguez
  - Assistant vocal engineer – Richard Woodcraft
- "We Can Fly Away"
  - Recording – Vince Pizzinga
  - Piano – Phil Burton
  - Mixing – Doug Brady
  - Producer – Human Nature

== Charts ==
=== Weekly charts ===
Weekly chart performance for Counting Down
Chart (1999–2000)	Peak position
Australian Albums (ARIA)	1
Japanese Albums (Oricon)	74

=== Year-end chart ===
Weekly chart performance for Counting Down
Chart (1999)	Position
Australian Albums (ARIA)	29

== Certifications ==
Certifications for Counting Down
Region	Certification	Certified units/sales
Australia (ARIA)	Platinum x 2	0^{^}
^{^} Shipments figures based on certification alone.
