= Don't Come Back =

2001 single by Human Nature

Single by Human Nature

from the album Human Nature
- Released: July 2001
- Recorded: Mangrove Studios, Sydney, Australia
- Genre: Pop
- Length: 3:37
- Label: Sony, Columbia
- Songwriter(s): Andrew Tierney, Michael Tierney, Paul Begaud
- Producer(s): Paul Begaud

Human Nature singles chronology
"When We Were Young" (2001)	"Don't Come Back" (2001)	"Always Be With You" (2001)

"Don't Come Back" is a song by Australian pop band Human Nature, released as the third and final single from their third album Human Nature in 2001.

The song is referenced in the Eskimo Joe song "Losing Friends Over Love", from their 2009 album Inshalla.

== Track listing ==
CD single (671413.2)

1. "Don't Come Back" (Murlyn Radio Remix) -3:37
2. "Don't Come Back" (Amen Radio Edit) -3:23
3. "Don't Come Back" (Amen Club Mix) -7:15
4. "When We Were Young" (Studio 347 Radio Remix) - 3:38
5. Enhanced video medley: "When We Were Young"/"He Don't Love You" (TV Week Logie Awards 2001 Performance)

Promo

1. "Don't Come Back" (Amen Club Mix)
2. "Don't Come Back" (Amen Radio Edit)
3. "Don't Come Back" (Dub Mix)

== Charts ==
Chart (2001)	Peak position
Australia (ARIA)	46
