= When You Say You Love Me =

"When You Say You Love Me" may refer to:

- "When You Say You Love Me", a song by Josh Groban from Closer
- "When You Say You Love Me" (Human Nature song), 2004
