= Always Be with You =

Always Be with You may refer to:

- Always Be with You (song), a 2001 song by Human Nature
- Always Be with You (film), a 2017 Hong Kong horror film
