= It's Gonna Be a Long Night =

It's Gonna Be a Long Night may refer to:

- "It's Gonna Be a Long Night", a song by Human Nature
- "It's Gonna Be a Long Night", a song by Ween
