= The Motor City Collection =

Box set by Human Nature
- Released: 19 April 2008
- Genre: Motown, pop
- Label: Sony/Columbia

Human Nature chronology
| Get Ready (2007) | The Motor City Collection (2008) | A Symphony of Hits (2008) |

The Motor City Collection is a box set by Australian pop vocal group Human Nature, which was issued on 19 April 2008 and peaked at No. 18 on the ARIA Albums Chart. It comprises three CDs of cover versions by the band of Motown artists' material and a live DVD.

The box set was released to coincide with a performance by Human Nature with Mary Wilson of the Supremes on the TV show It Takes Two on 22 April 2008. It includes the complete set of Human Nature's successful Motown trilogy, the three #1 albums, Reach Out, Dancing in the Street and Get Ready as well as their #1 DVD Reach Out – Live at the Capitol.

== Track listing ==
=== Disc 1; Reach Out: The Motown Record ===
1. "Reach Out I'll Be There"
2. "You Keep Me Hangin' On"
3. "Baby I Need Your Loving"
4. If You Don't Know Me By Now
5. I Heard It Through The Grapevine
6. Twenty-five Miles
7. I'll Be There
8. My Girl
9. I Want You Back
10. Stop! In The Name of Love
11. You Are Every Thing
12. "The Tracks of My Tears"

=== Disc 2; Dancing in the Street: the Songs of Motown II ===
1. Dancing in the Street
2. Ain't No Mountain High Enough
3. ABC
4. Signed, Sealed, Delivered I'm Yours
5. "You Can't Hurry Love"
6. Ain't To Proud To Beg
7. What's Going On
8. Uptight (Every Thing's Alright)
9. Please Mr. Postman
10. I Can't Get Next To You
11. Midnight Train To Georgia
12. I Can't Help Myself (Sugar Pie Honey Bunch)
13. What Becomes of the Broken Hearted
14. Just My Imagination (Running Away With Me)

=== Disc 3; Get Ready ===
1. Get Ready (with Smokey Robinson)
2. River Deep Mountain High (with Mary Wilson of the Supremes)
3. The Way You Do the Things You Do (with The Temptations)
4. Ain't Nothing Like The Real Thing
5. It Takes Two (with Mary Wilson of the Supremes)
6. Easy
7. Do You Love Me
8. Tears of a Clown (with Smokey Robinson)
9. It's the Same Old Song
10. How Sweet It Is (To Be Loved by You)
11. "(I Know) I'm Losing You"
12. (Love Is Like A) Heatwave (with Martha Reeves)
13. I'm Gonna Make You Love Me
14. "Ooo Baby Baby"
15. Jingle Bells [Bonus Christmas Track]

=== Disc 4 (DVD); Reach Out: Live at the Capital ===
1. Dancing in the Street
2. You Keep Me Hangin' On
3. Baby I Need Your Loving
4. I Heard It Through The Grapevine
5. If You Don't Know Me By Now
6. How Sweet It Is (To Be Loved By You)
7. Stop! In The Name of Love
8. You Are Every Thing
9. Every Time You Cry
10. Wishes
11. Tellin' Everybody
12. When You Say You Love Me
13. People Get Ready
14. I Want You Back
15. I Can't Help Myself (Sugar Pie, Honey Bunch)
16. What's Going On
17. The Tracks of My Tears
18. My Girl
19. I'll Be There
20. ABC
21. I Can't Get Next To You
22. Uptight (Every Thing's Alright)
23. Twenty-five Miles
24. Ain't No Mountain High Enough
25. Reach Out I'll Be There

== Charts ==
| Chart (2008) | Peak position |
|---|---|
| Australian Albums (ARIA) | 18 |
