= Telling Everybody =

Studio album by Human Nature
- Released: 29 November 1996
- Recorded: 1995–1996
- Genre: Pop
- Label: Sony/Columbia
- Producers: Paul Begaud, Andrew Klippel and Human Nature

Human Nature chronology
Telling Everybody (1996)	Counting Down (1999)

Singles from Telling Everybody
- 1. "Got It Goin' On" Released: March 1996; 2. "Tellin' Everybody" Released: July 1996; 3. "Wishes" Released: October 1996; 4. "Don't Say Goodbye" Released: March 1997; 5. "Whisper Your Name" Released: July 1997; 6. "People Get Ready" Released: December 1997

Telling Everybody is the debut album by Australian boy band and pop vocal group Human Nature released on 2 December 1996 by Columbia Records owned by Sony Music Entertainment Australia.

== Track listing ==
1. "Tellin' Everybody" (Andrew Tierney, Paul Begaud, Michael Tierney)– 4:01
2. "Got it Goin' On" (Tierney, Paul Begaud, Tierney) – 3:50
3. "Whisper Your Name" (Tierney, Paul Begaud, Tierney) – 4:19
4. "Wishes" (Andrew Klippel, Glass) – 4:04
5. "Something in the Way" (Klippel, Glass, Benedict, Tierney, Tierney) – 3:41
6. "Party (Feels So Fine)" (Tierney, Paul Begaud, Tierney) – 4:52
7. "Don't Say Goodbye" (Tierney, Paul Begaud, Tierney) – 4:22
8. "Can I Do You" (Klippel, Tierney, Phil Burton, Tierney, Toby Allen) – 4:58
9. "Sleepin' Alone" (Tierney, Kee, Tierney) – 3:57
10. "September Girl" (Tierney, Tierney) – 3:53
11. "Love Unconditional" (Klippel, Benedict, Lawrie) – 3:51
12. "People Get Ready" (Curtis Mayfield) – 3:18

=== Bonus CD tracks ===
1. "Wishes (AK's Comfort Zone Mix)" – 4:54
2. "Last Christmas (A Capella)" – 3:09
3. "Tellin' Everybody (On the Floor)" – 6:08
4. "Wishes (A Capella)" – 3:48
5. "Got It Goin' On (Nuff Club Mix)" – 7:21

== Charts ==
=== Weekly charts ===
Chart (1996–97)	Peak position
Australian Albums (ARIA)	7
German Albums (GfK Entertainment Charts)	82
Japanese Albums (Oricon)	93

=== Year-end chart ===
Chart (1997)	Position
Australian Albums (ARIA Charts)	11

== Certifications ==
Region	Certification	Certified units/sales
Australia (ARIA)	4× Platinum	280,000^{‡}
^{‡} Sales+streaming figures based on certification alone.

== Credits ==
- Vocal arrangements by Human Nature (tracks: 1 to 10, 12), Phil Burton (tracks: 1 to 10, 12)
- Design – Kevin Wilkins
- Engineer – Carmen Rizzo (tracks: 1, 2, 7, 10), Louie Shelton (tracks: 4, 5, 8, 11), James Cadsky (track 3), David Hemming (track 12)
- Guitar – Paul Begaud (tracks: 1, 2, 6, 10), Louie Shelton (tracks: 8, 9), Chris Bruce (track 5)
- Mastered by Carmen Rizzo, Chris Bellman
- Scratches – DJ A.S.K. (track 9)
- Mixed by Carmen Rizzo (tracks: 1 to 5, 8, 10, 11), Mick Guzauski (track 7), David Hemming (track 12)
- Photography – Vicki Ballard
- Producer – Andrew Klippel (tracks: 4, 5, 8, 11), Paul Begaud (tracks: 1 to 3, 6, 7, 9, 10)
- Programmed by Andrew Klippel (tracks: 4, 5, 8, 11), Paul Begaud (tracks: 1 to 3, 6, 7, 9, 10)
