= Jukebox (Human Nature album) =

Studio album by Human Nature
- Released: 10 October 2014
- Recorded: Las Vegas, Calgary, Toronto
- Genre: Doo-wop, traditional pop
- Label: Sony
- Producer: David Pierce & Bob Rock

Human Nature chronology
The Christmas Album (2013)	Jukebox (2014)	Gimme Some Lovin': Jukebox Vol II (2016)

Jukebox is the eleventh studio album by Australian pop vocal group Human Nature released in October 2014. It contains covers from the 1950s and 1960s, alongside one original song, "End of Days".

Group member Andrew Tierney said of 'End of Days'; "It's really become a highlight on the record. It goes back to those soul ballads, and it's also got a contemporary edge to it because it's a new song. It's such a thrill to have our own song alongside these classics and part of our own Jukebox."

== Background ==
Following the success of The Christmas Album, Human Nature returned to the studio to record a new album; this time, an album of covers from the 1950s and 60's. In 1989, the first song Human Nature ever sang together was Earth Angel by The Penguins. Group member Toby Allen said; "For us…the 'Jukebox' record is kind of going back to our roots and revisiting it…that classic doo-wop stuff was what we did when we got together." He continued, "We've developed enough over the years that we can go back to the past in a confident manner."

The album will be supported by a national tour in April/May 2015.

== Promotion ==
Human Nature performed Earth Angel live on Sunrise on September 1.

Human Nature performed "Will You Love Me Tomorrow" and "Runaound Sue" live on Dancing with the Stars on October 28.

Human Nature released a music video for Runaround Sue on October 10 and Will You Love Me Tomorrow on October 17 via their VEVO account.

== Track listing ==
No.	Title	Writer(s)	Length
1.	"Will You Love Me Tomorrow"	Gerry Goffin and Carole King	2:47
2.	"Runaround Sue"	Dion DiMucci and Ernie Maresca	2:55
3.	"Under the Boardwalk"	Kenny Young and Arthur Resnick	3:16
4.	"Stand by Me"	Ben E. King, Jerry Leiber and Mike Stoller	3:14
5.	"Good Lovin'"	Rudy Clark and Arthur Resnick	2:42
6.	"Unchained Melody"	Alex North and Hy Zaret	3:56
7.	"Stay"	Maurice Williams and the Zodiacs	3:15
8.	"Wonderful World"	Lou Adler, Herb Alpert and Sam Cooke	2:54
9.	"Only You (And You Alone)"	Buck Ram	3:37
10.	"Little Bitty Pretty One"	Bobby Day	2:33
11.	"I Only Have Eyes for You"	Harry Warren and Al Dubin	3:11
12.	"End of Days"	Human Nature	4:00
13.	"Twist and Shout"	Phil Medley and Bert Berns	2:41
14.	"Earth Angel"	Curtis Williams, Jesse Belvin and Gaynel Hodge	3:11

== Critical reception ==
A writer from smoothfm described Jukebox as a "brilliant collection" and that Human Nature "takes a trip back to the glory days of popular music". Kirsten Maree from Renowned For Sound gave the album four out of five stars. She also praised the group's vocals, saying "what I love most about Andrew, Michael, Toby and Phil is their unwavering dedication not to out-do the classics, but pay tribute to them. This kind of project in anyone else's hands may not be worth it, but with Human Nature, we have a winner."

== Tour ==
In October 2014, Human Nature announced a 5-date Australian tour, commencing in Perth on April 28, 2015 An additional Sydney show was added in November.

Date	Location	Venue
28 April 2015	Perth	Perth Convention and Exhibition Centre
29 April 2015	Adelaide	Adelaide Entertainment Centre
1 May 2015	Gold Coast	Jupiters Hotel and Casino
6 May 2015	Sydney	State Theatre
7 May 2015	Sydney	State Theatre
9 May 2015	Melbourne	Hamer Hall

== Charts ==
=== Weekly charts ===
Chart (2014)	Peak position
Australian Albums (ARIA)	2

=== Year-end charts ===
Chart (2014)	Position
Australian Albums Chart	10
Chart (2015)	Position
Australian Albums Chart	48

== Certifications ==
Region	Certification	Certified units/sales
Australia (ARIA)	2× Platinum	140,000^{^}
^{^} Shipments figures based on certification alone.

== See also ==
- List of top 25 albums for 2014 in Australia
