= The Christmas Album (Human Nature album) =

Studio album by Human Nature
- Released: 8 November 2013
- Genre: Christmas
- Label: Sony
- Producer: Harvey Mason Jr. / Damon Thomas

Human Nature chronology
| The Essential Human Nature (2010) | The Christmas Album (2013) | Jukebox (2014) |

The Christmas Album is the tenth studio album and first Christmas album by Australian pop vocal group Human Nature, released in November 2013.

The album was re-released with four additional tracks in November 2015.

== Background ==
The album was recorded in Los Angeles and Las Vegas and features cover version of successful Christmas songs such as "White Christmas", "Winter Wonderland" and a medley consisting of "Silent Night" mixed with "O Holy Night". The Christmas Album includes two duets; one with Australian singer Jessica Mauboy and the other with Smokey Robinson. The album was supported by a national tour in December 2013, accompanied by a 16-piece band.

== Music videos ==
Human Nature released 6 music videos via their Vevo account throughout November and December 2013. "Let It Snow, Let It Snow, Let It Snow" featuring Delta Goodrem was released in November 2015, to support the deluxe edition of the album.

| Year | Date | Title |
|---|---|---|
| 2013 | 19 November | "Christmas Baby Please Come Home" |
| 2013 | 21 November | "Santa Claus Is Coming to Town" |
| 2013 | 28 November | "Winter Wonderland" |
| 2013 | 1 December | "Have Yourself a Merry Little Christmas" |
| 2013 | 3 December | "Silent Night" |
| 2013 | 5 December | "White Christmas" |
| 2015 | 12 November | "Let It Snow, Let It Snow, Let It Snow" |

== Critical reception ==
Andrew Le of Renowned for Sound gave the album 3.5 out of 5 stars, saying that the tone is generally upbeat and "soulful vocals with retro touches and rich, heavenly harmonies are what Human Nature do best".

== Track listing ==
| No. | Title | Writer(s) | Length |
|---|---|---|---|
| 1. | "White Christmas" | Irving Berlin | 2:53 |
| 2. | "Christmas (Baby Please Come Home)" | Jeff Barry / Ellie Greenwich / Phil Spector | 3:00 |
| 3. | "Sleigh Ride" (featuring Jessica Mauboy) | Leroy Anderson | 3:00 |
| 4. | "Have Yourself a Merry Little Christmas" | Hugh Martin / Ralph Blane | 3:27 |
| 5. | "Winter Wonderland" | Felix Bernard / Richard B. Smith | 3:03 |
| 6. | "Please Come Home for Christmas" (featuring Smokey Robinson) | Charles Brown / Gene Redd | 2:49 |
| 7. | "Silent Night / O Holy Night" | Franz Xaver Gruber / Joseph Mohr / John Freeman Young / Adolphe Adam | 4:30 |
| 8. | "Rudolph the Red-Nosed Reindeer" | Johnny Marks | 2:19 |
| 9. | "Christmas Without You" | Andrew Tierney / Damon Thomas / Harvey Mason, Jr. / Kenneth Crouch | 2:55 |
| 10. | "Give Love on Christmas Day" | Berry Gordy / Alphonzo Mizell / Christine Perren / Freddie Perren / Deke Richards | 3:27 |
| 11. | "Santa Claus Is Coming to Town" | John Frederick Coots / Haven Gillespie | 3:25 |
| 12. | "This Christmas" | Nadine McKinnor / Donny Pitts | 3:10 |
| 13. | "Amazing Grace" (featuring Prague Philharmonic Orchestra) | John Newton / William Walker | 3:58 |
| 14. | "Mary's Boy Child" | Jester Hairston | 2:43 |

2015 – Deluxe edition bonus tracks
| No. | Title | Writer(s) | Length |
|---|---|---|---|
| 15. | "Let It Snow! Let It Snow! Let It Snow!" (featuring Delta Goodrem) | Sammy Cahn / Jule Styne | 3:06 |
| 16. | "Run Rudolph Run" | Johnny Marks / Marvin Brodie |
| 17. | "I'll Be Home for Christmas" | Bing Crosby |
| 18. | "A Holly Jolly Christmas" | Johnny Marks |

== Tour ==
"We can’t wait to get back home for Christmas! We’re thrilled to be able to perform some of the best holiday classics to our loyal Aussie fans at such a special time of the year. We’ll definitely have crowds rockin’ around the Christmas tree at these shows!"

— Human Nature's Andrew Tierney

Human Nature announced a 10-day Australian tour to promote the album, commencing in Melbourne on 5 December 2013.

| Date | Location | Venue |
|---|---|---|
| 5–8 December 2013 | Melbourne | The Palms at Crown |
| 13–14 December 2013 | Gold Coast | Jupiter Theatre |
| 17–18 December 2013 | Sydney | The State Theatre |
| 19 December 2013 | Adelaide | Festival Hall |
| 20 December 2013 | Perth | The Perth Zoo |

== Charts ==
The album debuted on the Australian ARIA charts at number 12 and climbed three spots to 9 the following week and was certified Platinum. In the third week, it climbed another three spots to number 6. It peaked at number 4 in its fifth week.

=== Weekly charts ===
| Chart (2013–20) | Peak position |
|---|---|
| Australian Albums (ARIA) | 4 |
| US Heatseekers Albums (Billboard) | 13 |

=== Year-end charts ===
| Chart (2013) | Position |
|---|---|
| Australian Albums (ARIA) | 16 |
| Chart (2015) | Position |
| Australian Albums (ARIA) | 42 |

=== Decade-end charts ===
| Chart (2010–2019) | Position |
|---|---|
| Australian Albums (ARIA) | 68 |
| Australian Artist Albums (ARIA) | 12 |

== Sales and certifications ==
| Region | Certification | Certified units/sales |
|---|---|---|
| Australia (ARIA) | 2× Platinum | 140,000^{^} |
^{^} Shipments figures based on certification alone.

== See also ==
- List of top 25 albums for 2013 in Australia
