= Got It Goin' On =

Single by Human Nature

from the album Telling Everybody
- B-side: "Sleepin' Alone"
- Released: 1 March 1996
- Recorded: 1995–1996; Sydney, Australia
- Genre: Pop
- Length: 3:53
- Label: Sony, Columbia
- Songwriter(s): Paul Begaud, Andrew Tierney, Michael Tierney
- Producer(s): Paul Begaud

Human Nature singles chronology
"Got It Goin' On" (1996)	"Tellin' Everybody" (1996)

International cover
- The same artwork showing the track's name; "You Got It"

"Got It Goin' On" is the debut single by Australian group Human Nature. The song peaked at No. 19 in Australia and No. 30 in New Zealand.

It was released internationally under the name "You Got It".

== Track listing ==
CD single (662472 2)

1. "Got It Goin' On" – 3:53
2. "Sleepin' Alone" – 3:58
3. "Got It Goin' On" (Nuff Club Mix) – 7:22
4. "Got It Goin' On" (Lounge Mix) – 4:41
5. "Got It Goin' On" (Nuff Dub Mix) – 7:19

== Charts ==
"Got It Goin' On" debuted at No. 48 in Australia before rising to a peak of No. 19.

Chart (1996)	Peak position
Australia (ARIA)	19
New Zealand (Recorded Music NZ)	30

== Awards ==
"Got It Goin' On" delivered Human Nature its first ARIA Award for “Best New Talent” at the 1996 awards. It lost out to "Fool for You" by Monique Brumby.

Year	Nominee / work	Award	Result
1996	"Got It Goin' On"	Best New Talent	Nominated
