= Guilty (Barbra Streisand and Barry Gibb song) =

1980 vocal duet

Single by Barbra Streisand and Barry Gibb

from the album Guilty
- B-side: "Life Story"
- Released: October 1980
- Recorded: 1980
- Studio: Middle Ear (Miami)
- Genre: Lounge-pop; yacht rock
- Length: 4:23
- Label: Columbia (US); CBS (UK)
- Songwriter: Barry, Robin & Maurice Gibb
- Producer: Gibb-Galuten-Richardson

Barbra Streisand singles chronology
| "Woman in Love" (1980) | "Guilty" (1980) | "What Kind of Fool" (1981) |

Barry Gibb singles chronology
| "Woman in Love" (1980) | "Guilty" (1980) | "What Kind of Fool" (1981) |

Audio
- "Barbra Streisand - Guilty (Official Audio) ft. Barry Gibb" on YouTube

"Guilty" is a vocal duet between Barbra Streisand and Barry Gibb. The song was written by all three Bee Gees: Barry, Robin & Maurice Gibb. Released as a single from Streisand's 1980 album of the same name, "Guilty" peaked at No. 3 on the US Billboard Hot 100 chart and No. 5 on the adult contemporary chart. In the UK, the song reached No. 34 on the UK Singles Chart. The single was certified gold by the RIAA. In addition, "Guilty" won a Grammy Award in the category Best Pop Vocal Performance, Duo or Group. The song also appeared on the 2001 Bee Gees compilation, Their Greatest Hits: The Record.

There is also a version by Tom Jones and Gladys Knight.

== Reception ==
Record World said that "Barbra's vocal glistens like an early morning dewdrop while Barry adorns with plush harmonies" In 2023, American Songwriter and The Guardian both named "Guilty" as Streisand's second-greatest song.

== Personnel ==
- Barbra Streisand – lead vocals
- Barry Gibb – lead and backing vocals, guitar, horn and string arrangement
- George Terry – guitar
- Cornell Dupree – guitar
- Richard Tee – electric piano
- George Bitzer – electric piano
- Harold Cowart – bass
- Steve Gadd – drums
- Joe Lala – percussion

== Charts ==
=== Weekly charts ===
| Chart (1980–1981) | Peak position |
|---|---|
| Australia (KMR) | 37 |
| Belgium (Ultratop 50 Flanders) | 9 |
| Canada RPM Top Singles | 13 |
| Ireland (IRMA) | 21 |
| Netherlands (Single Top 100) | 15 |
| New Zealand (Recorded Music NZ)[ | 12 |
| Norway (VG-lista) | 4 |
| Spain (PROMUSICAE) | 11 |
| UK Singles (Official Charts) | 34 |
| US Billboard Hot 100 | 3 |
| US Adult Contemporary (Billboard) | 5 |
| US Cash Box Top 100 | 8 |
| West Germany (GfK) | 15 |

=== Year-end charts ===
| Chart (1980) | Rank |
|---|---|
| US Cash Box | 82 |

| Chart (1981) | Rank |
|---|---|
| US Billboard Hot 100 | 29 |

== Certifications ==
| Region | Certification | Certified units/sales |
|---|---|---|
| United Kingdom (BPI) | Silver | 200,000^{‡} |
^{‡} Sales+streaming figures based on certification alone.

== Human Nature version ==
"Guilty (One in a Million)"

Single by Human Nature

from the album Walk the Tightrope
- Released: August 2004
- Recorded: Sydney, Australia
- Genre: Pop
- Length: 3:50
- Label: Sony BMG
- Songwriter: Barry, Robin & Maurice Gibb

Human Nature singles chronology
| "When You Say You Love Me" (2001) | "Guilty (One in a Million)" (2004) | "Uptight (Everything's Alright)" (2007) |

Australian band Human Nature, released a cover version of the song as the second single from their album Walk the Tightrope. It introduced rapper Kelly K.A.E. The song peaked at No. 33 in Australia.

=== Music video ===
A music video was released to promote the song; with the group and Kelly K.A.E. singing the song in a studio. At one point, you see them flicking through vinyl records, one of which is the album “Guilty” by Streisand.

=== Track listing ===
CD single

1. "Guilty"
2. "Guilty" (Instrumental)
3. "When You Say You Love Me" (Ben Hudson Drums Mix)
4. "Haunted"

=== Charts ===
| Chart (2004) | Peak position |
|---|---|
| Australia (ARIA) | 33 |

== Barry Gibb version ==
"Guilty"

Song by Barry Gibb

from the album The Guilty Demos
- Released: November 2006
- Recorded: October 1979 at Criteria Studios, Miami
- Length: 4:02
- Songwriter: Barry, Robin & Maurice Gibb
- Producer: Barry Gibb

"Guilty" is a song originally recorded by Barry Gibb as a guideline to Barbra Streisand for her album Guilty. Gibb performs on guitar, Blue Weaver on keyboard and Albhy Galuten on synthesizer.

The demo however sounds like the others, and since Gibb sings it in falsetto throughout he had probably not yet decided to make it a duet. (By contrast, parts of "What Kind of Fool" are natural voice.) It was said to have been the last song submitted for the album.

=== Personnel ===
- Barry Gibb – vocals, guitar
- Blue Weaver – keyboard
- Albhy Galuten – synthesizer, drum machine
