= Be There with You =

"Be There With You"

Single by Human Nature

from the album Counting Down
- A-side: "Be There With You"
- B-side: "remixes"
- Released: March 2000
- Recorded: Studios 301, 1998
- Genre: Pop music
- Length: 3:53
- Label: Sony Music Records, Columbia Records
- Songwriter(s): Paul Begaud, Andrew Tierney, Michael Tierney
- Producer(s): Paul Begaud

Human Nature singles chronology
"Eternal Flame" (1999)	"Be There With You" (2000)	"He Don't Love You" (2000)

"Be There With You" is a song by Human Nature, released as the fifth and final single from their album second studio album Counting Down (1999). The song peaked at No. 40 in Australia.

== Track listing ==
CD single (667424.2)

1. "Be There With You" (Radio Version) - 3:53
2. "Be There With You" (Patric Berger Mix) - 3:58
3. "Be There With You" (Trouser Enthusiasts' Electric Ecstasy Mix) - 4:36
4. "Counting Down" (Acoustic) - 3:25
5. "Earth Angel" (Live Version) - 6:08
6. VIDEO "Don't Cry"
- Track 5 originally released on "Happy Days, The Arena Mega Musical".

== Charts ==
=== Weekly charts ===
Chart (2000)	Peak position
Australia (ARIA)	40
