= Romance of the Jukebox =

Studio album by Human Nature
- Released: 17 August 2018
- Label: Sony
- Producer: Steve Fitzmaurice & Ben Parker

Human Nature chronology
| Gimme Some Lovin': Jukebox Vol II (2016) | Romance of the Jukebox (2018) | Still Telling Everybody: 30 Years of Hits (2019) |

Romance of the Jukebox is the thirteenth studio album by Australian pop vocal group Human Nature set for release in August 2018.

The album was supported by a "one night only" concert on 21 August 2018 at The Star in Sydney.

== Track listing ==
| No. | Title | Writer(s) | Length |
|---|---|---|---|
| 1. | "Love Is All Around" | Reg Presley | 3:52 |
| 2. | "I'm a Believer" | Neil Diamond | 3:11 |
| 3. | "Little More Love" | | 3:14 |
| 4. | "Crazy Love" | | 3:16 |
| 5. | "Love Train" | Kenny Gamble, Leon Huff | 2:42 |
| 6. | "Bridge Over Troubled Water" | Paul Simon | 3:43 |
| 7. | "Can't Buy Me Love" | Lennon–McCartney | 2:35 |
| 8. | "To Love Somebody" | Barry Gibb, Robin Gibb | 2:50 |
| 9. | "Love Hurts" | Boudleaux Bryant | 2:36 |
| 10. | "These Arms of Mine" | Otis Redding | 2:37 |
| 11. | "I Say a Little Prayer" (featuring Dami Im) | Burt Bacharach, Hal David | 2:53 |
| 12. | "All You Need Is Love" | Lennon–McCartney | 3:15 |

== Charts ==
| Chart (2018) | Peak position |
|---|---|
| Australian Albums (ARIA) | 2 |
