= Walk the Tightrope =

Studio album by Human Nature
- Released: 26 April 2004
- Genres: Pop, disco
- Length: 45:48
- Label: Sony/Columbia

Human Nature chronology
Here & Now: The Best of Human Nature (2001)	Walk the Tightrope (2004)	Reach Out: The Motown Record (2005)

Singles from Walk the Tightrope
- 1. "When You Say You Love Me" Released: 12 April 2004; 2. "Guilty (One in a Million)" Released: August 2004

Professional ratings
Review scores
Source	Rating
Undercover Media	link

Walk the Tightrope is the fourth studio album by Australian boy band and pop vocal group Human Nature released on 26 April 2004. After a three-year absence since their greatest hits album, Here & Now: The Best of Human Nature, the group returned with a more adult-contemporary sound, presaging their future move to nostalgia type covers.

== Making of the album ==
The first single "When You Say You Love Me" was written by Darren Hayes, formerly of Savage Garden, and reached the top 10 in Australia in April 2004 (the song was also covered by Clay Aiken). The music video was shot at a petrol station in Homebush, New South Wales, in the dead of night.

The album also features a cover version of "To Be with You", a 1992 hit by glam metal band Mr. Big.

Andrew Tierney of the band says on the group's official website that performing an unrecorded Bee Gees song given to the band by Barry Gibb was a particular thrill. "The Bee Gees were, without a doubt, the major inspiration for this record. We looked at them, and above their image and what they wore, the thing that kept them current was the fact they consistently came up with incredible songs. Great songs sustain a career. So with this record, we just wanted great songs."

== Track listing ==
Composer in brackets.

1. "Walk the Tightrope"
2. "To Be With You" (David Grahame, Eric Martin)
3. "She's Back (Again)"
4. "When You Say You Love Me" (Darren Hayes/Rick Nowels)
5. "Haunted"
6. "Deja Vu"
7. "She"
8. "Woke Up in Love" (a vocal interlude)
9. "Meant to Be"
10. "Life Just Gets Better"
11. "Raining in California"
12. "Love Is Blind" (Barry Gibb/Maurice Gibb/Robin Gibb)
13. "Guilty (One in a Million)" (ft. Kelly K.A.E.)

== Charts ==
=== Weekly charts ===
Chart (2004)	Peak position
Australian Albums (ARIA)	12

=== Year-end charts ===
Chart (2004)	Position
Australian Albums (ARIA)	98

== Certifications ==
Region	Certification	Certified units/sales
Australia (ARIA)	Gold	35,000^{^}
^{^} Shipments figures based on certification alone.
