= Vegas: Songs from Sin City =

Studio album by Human Nature
- Released: 12 November 2010
- Recorded: Palms Studio, Paradise, Nevada
- Genre: Pop
- Length: 41:48
- Label: Sony
- Producer: Harvey Mason Jr

Human Nature chronology
A Symphony of Hits (2008)	Vegas: Songs from Sin City (2010)	The Essential Human Nature (2010)

Vegas: Songs from Sin City is the ninth studio album by Australian pop vocal group Human Nature released on 12 November 2010. For the first time in their career, bass singer Toby Allen features on lead vocals, on both "A Little Less Conversation" and on "Sway". The track listing below is the way the songs are ordered on the Australian release. The US release features most of the songs in a different order, and a different song for the last track, which is "Are You Lonesome Tonight / Love Me Tender" instead of "That's Life".

The album was recorded at the Studio at the Palms, Paradise, Nevada and produced by Harvey Mason Jr (Jennifer Hudson, Whitney Houston, Britney Spears, E-17 and Michael Jackson).

== Track listing ==
1. "Sin City" (Angus Young, Malcolm Young, Bon Scott) 4:11
2. "The Lady Is a Tramp" (Richard Rodgers, Lorenz Hart) 3:34
3. "Viva Las Vegas" (Doc Pomus, Mort Shuman) 2:42
4. "It's Not Unusual" (Les Reed, Gordon Mills) 3:30
5. "Can't Take My Eyes Off You" (Bob Crewe, Bob Gaudio) 3:57
6. "A Little Less Conversation" (Mac David, Billy Strange) 3:47
7. "Could It Be Magic / Mandy" (featuring Barry Manilow) (Barry Manilow, Adrienne Anderson / Scott English, Richard Kerr) 5:06
8. "Sway" (Pablo Beltrán Ruiz, Norman Gimbel) 2:53
9. "She's a Lady" (Paul Anka) 2:48
10. "Danke Schoen" (Bert Kaempfert, Kurt Schwabach, Milton Gabler) 3:12
11. "Jump Jive an' Wail" (Louis Prima) 2:51
12. "That's Life" (a cappella) (Kelly Gordon, Dean Kay) 3:17

== Charts ==
=== Weekly charts ===
Chart (2010)	Peak position
Australian Albums (ARIA)	21

=== Year-end charts ===
Chart (2010)	Position
Australian Albums (ARIA)	83

=== Certifications ===
Region	Certification	Certified units/sales
Australia (ARIA)	Gold	35,000^{^}
^{^} Shipments figures based on certification alone.
