= Always Be with You (song) =

Single by Human Nature

from the album Here & Now: The Best of Human Nature
- Released: 5 November 2001
- Recorded: 2001
- Length: 3:47
- Label: Sony Music, Columbia
- Songwriter(s): Andrew Tierney; Michael Tierney; Kevin Spencer; Leon Foster Sylvers
- Producer(s): Ray Hedges; Andrew Tierney; Michael Tierney

Human Nature singles chronology
"Don't Come Back" (2001)	"Always Be with You" (2001)	"When You Say You Love Me" (2004)

"Always Be with You" is a song by Australian group Human Nature. It was released as the first and only single from their first greatest hits album Here & Now: The Best of Human Nature (2001). The song peaked at No. 29 in Australia.

== Track listing ==
CD single (672115.2)

1. "Always Be with You" – 3:47
2. "Always Be with You" (Club Mix) – 6:22
3. "Always Be with You" (Club Radio Mix) – 4:08
4. "If I Only Had the Heart" – 3:46
5. "Counting Down" – 3:24

== Charts ==
Chart performance for "Always Be with You"
Chart (2001)	Peak position
Australia (ARIA)	29
