= Tellin' Everybody =

Single by Human Nature

from the album Telling Everybody
- A-side: "Tellin' Everybody"
- B-side: "Party (Feels So Fine)"
- Released: July 1996
- Recorded: Studios 301, Sydney, Australia
- Genre: Pop
- Length: 4:02
- Label: Sony Music Records, Columbia Records
- Songwriter(s): Paul Begaud, Andrew Tierney, Michael Tierney
- Producer(s): Paul Begaud

Human Nature singles chronology
| "Got It Goin' On" (1996) | "Tellin' Everybody" (1996) | "Wishes" (1997) |

"Tellin' Everybody" is a song by Australian group Human Nature. It was released as the second single from the debut studio album Telling Everybody. The song peaked at No. 30 in Australia and No. 82 in Germany.

== Track listing ==
CD single (663615 1)

1. "Tellin' Everybody" - 4:02
2. "Party (Feels So Fine)" - 4:52

CD maxi (663266 2)

1. "Tellin' Everybody" - 4:02
2. "Party (Feels So Fine)" - 4:52
3. "Tellin' Everybody (On the Floor)" - 6:07

== Charts ==
=== Weekly charts ===
"Tellin' Everybody" debuted at No. 32 in Australia before rising to a peak of No. 31.

| Chart (1996) | Peak position |
|---|---|
| Australia (ARIA) | 30 |
| Germany (GfK) | 82 |
