= Get Ready (Human Nature album) =

Studio album by Human Nature
- Released: 17 November 2007
- Recorded: 2007
- Genre: Pop
- Label: Sony BMG/Columbia
- Producer: Paul Wiltshire

Human Nature chronology
Dancing in the Street: the Songs of Motown II (2006)	Get Ready (2007)	The Motor City Collection (2008)

Get Ready is the seventh studio album by Australian pop vocal group Human Nature and third in their series Motown covers release. It was released on 17 November 2007.

The album features guest appearances by Motown legends Smokey Robinson, The Temptations, Mary Wilson of The Supremes, and Martha Reeves.

The final installment of the Motown trilogy was recorded in Detroit, Las Vegas and Los Angeles over the summer of 2007.

On 24 November 2007 Get Ready hit number two on the ARIA Australian albums chart.

== Track listing ==
1. "Get Ready" (with Smokey Robinson) (Smokey Robinson)
2. "River Deep – Mountain High" (with Mary Wilson) (Jeff Barry, Ellie Greenwich, Phil Spector)
3. "The Way You Do the Things You Do" (with The Temptations) (Robinson, Bobby Rogers)
4. "Ain't Nothing Like the Real Thing" (Nickolas Ashford, Valerie Simpson)
5. "It Takes Two" (with Mary Wilson) (Mickey Stevenson, Sylvia Moy)
6. "Easy" (Lionel Richie)
7. "Do You Love Me" (Berry Gordy)
8. "The Tears of a Clown" (with Smokey Robinson) (Robinson, Hank Cosby, Stevie Wonder)
9. "It's the Same Old Song" (Brian Holland, Lamont Dozier, Eddie Holland)
10. "How Sweet It Is (To Be Loved by You)" (Holland, Dozier, Holland)
11. "(I Know) I'm Losing You" (Cornelius Grant, Norman Whitfield, Eddie Holland)
12. "(Love Is Like A) Heat Wave" (with Martha Reeves) (Holland, Dozier, Holland)
13. "I'm Gonna Make You Love Me" (Kenny Gamble, Leon Huff, Jerry Ross)
14. "Ooo Baby Baby" (Robinson, Pete Moore)
15. "Jingle Bells" (bonus track)

== Charts ==
Chart (2007)	Peak position
Australian Albums (ARIA)	2

== Certifications ==
Region	Certification	Certified units/sales
Australia (ARIA)	Platinum	70,000^{^}
^{^} Shipments figures based on certification alone.
