= Phil Burton =

- Born: Phillip Andrew Burton; 13 March 1974 (age 52); Sydney, New South Wales, Australia
- Genres: Pop, vocal
- Occupation: Musician
- Instruments: Vocals, guitar, piano
- Years active: 1989–present
- Label: Sony
- Member of: Human Nature
- Website: Official Site

Phillip Andrew Burton OAM (born 13 March 1974) is an Australian musician best known as a member of the Australian pop vocal band Human Nature with Toby Allen, Andrew Tierney and his brother Michael Tierney since 1989.

With Human Nature, he has won an ARIA Music Award for Reach Out: The Motown Record. Phil has also competed in Dancing with the Stars Australia coming in first place and winning the mirror ball trophy with his dance partner Ash-Leigh Hunter.

== Biography ==
Phil Burton grew up in Sydney, New South Wales and studied at Hurlstone Agricultural High School where he met Toby Allen and Andrew Tierney. The three were in the same year level and worked in the school productions of Godspell and Grease. They formed a band named, 4Trax, and performed for the first time in 1989 at a schools' combined concert singing "Earth Angel".

With Human Nature, Burton has won a Highest Selling Album ARIA Music Award for Reach Out: The Motown Record in 2006. As from 2009, the band has had 16 ARIA nominations. During 2009, the band performed in Las Vegas at the Imperial Palace Hotel and Casino. They returned to Australia in November and performed with Smokey Robinson at the Wyndham Estate in the Hunter Valley in December.

In May 2023, it was announced that Burton would be participating in the twentieth series of Dancing with the Stars. He was paired with Ash-Leigh Hunter. Announced on the 23 July, Phil and Ashley won the mirror ball trophy for their freestyle dance. Awarded 39 points out of the possible 40, the pair came equal first however won the audience vote, crowing them the winner of Dancing with the Stars Australia 2023.

In 2024, Burton began to regularly fill in for Larry Emdur on The Morning Show on the Seven Network.

== Personal life ==
Burton married Justine Smith, who had worked in marketing and communications for a financial company. The couple lived in Belrose, New South Wales, before moving to Las Vegas in 2009. As of October 2016, they have two children: Ash Burton (born 2008) and Xavier Burton (born 2014). Burton and his family moved back to Sydney, Australia in October 2020, and they currently reside in the North Shore area.
