= He Don't Love You =

2000 single by Human Nature

Single by Human Nature

from the album Human Nature
- Released: 5 November 2000
- Recorded: Sydney, Australia
- Genre: Pop
- Length: 3:11
- Label: Sony BMG
- Songwriters: Steve Mac, Wayne Hector
- Producer: Steve Mac

Human Nature singles chronology
"Be There With You" (2000)	"He Don't Love You" (2000)	"When We Were Young" (2001)

"He Don't Love You" is a song by Human Nature, released as the first single from their self-titled album Human Nature. The song peaked at No. 4 in Australia, and at No. 18 in the UK.

The Mark Hartley directed music video was nominated for Best Video at the ARIA Music Awards of 2001.

== Music video ==
There were two versions filmed: one was the Australian version set in a factory, whilst the UK version was almost the same, but featured Neighbours star Holly Valance. The video also contains video and photo shoots by media. The cover of their self-titled album is a still from towards the end of the music video.

== Track listing ==
=== UK CD single ===
1. "He Don't Love You" – 3:09
2. "He Don't Love You" (Amen UK Club Remix) – 5:48
3. "Wishes" (new version) (Alan Glass, Andrew Klippel) – 4:02
4. "He Don't Love You" (UK video) – 3:13

=== UK Cassette single ===
1. "He Don't Love You" – 3:09
2. "He Don't Love You" (Amen UK Radio Remix) – 3:33
3. "Wishes" (new version)

=== Australian single ===
1. "He Don't Love You" – 3:09
2. "Angel of Your Heart" (Andrew Tierney, Jörgen Elofsson) – 4:01
3. "Don't Cry" (US Radio Mix) (Alan Glass, Andrew Klippel) – 3:59

Note: "Angel of Your Heart" is incorrectly titled "Angel of My Heart".

=== UK and European single ===
1. "He Don't Love You" – 3:09
2. "He Don't Love You" (Amen UK Club Remix) – 5:48

== Charts ==
=== Weekly charts ===
Chart (2000/01)	Peak position
Australia (ARIA)	4
Europe (Eurochart Hot 100)	77
Scottish Singles Sales (Official Charts)	20
UK Singles (Official Charts)	18

=== Year-end charts ===
Chart (2000)	Position
Australia (ARIA)	53

== Certifications ==
Region	Certification	Certified units/sales
Australia (ARIA)	Platinum	70,000^{^}
^{^} Shipments figures based on certification alone.
