= Last to Know (Human Nature song) =

Single by Human Nature

from the album Counting Down
- A-side: "Last to Know"
- B-side: "She's Taken My Words"/ "Ride Away"
- Released: 12 March 1999
- Recorded: 1998
- Genre: Pop
- Length: 4:11
- Label: Sony Music Records, Columbia Records
- Songwriter(s): Steve Kipner, Dane Deviller, Sean Hosein
- Producer(s): Paul Begaud

Human Nature singles chronology
"Cruel" (1998)	"Last to Know" (1999)	"Don't Cry" (1999)

"Last to Know" is a song by Human Nature, released as the second single from their second studio album Counting Down (1999). The song peaked at No. 14 in Australia and was certified Gold.

== Track listing ==
- CD single (666927.2)
1. "Last To Know" – 4:29
2. "She's Taken My Words" – 6:06
3. "Ride Away" – 5:11
- CD Maxi
1. "Last To Know" – 4:29
2. "She's Taken My Words" – 6:06
3. "Ride Away" – 5:11
4. "Last To Know" (Radio Remix) – 4:05
5. "Last To Know" (VV Radio Edit) – 3:36
6. "Last To Know" (VV Club Remix) – 6:42

== Charts ==
=== Weekly charts ===
Chart (1999)	Peak position
Australia (ARIA)	14

=== Year-end charts ===
Chart (1999)	Position
Australia (ARIA)	86

== Sales and certifications ==
Region	Certification	Certified units/sales
Australia (ARIA)	Gold	35,000^{^}
^{^} Shipments figures based on certification alone.
