= Don't Say Goodbye (Human Nature song) =

Single by Human Nature

from the album Telling Everybody
- B-side: "September Girl"
- Released: 9 March 1997
- Recorded: 1996
- Genre: Pop
- Length: 4:22
- Label: Sony Music Records, Columbia Records
- Songwriters: Paul Begaud, Michael Tierney, Andrew Tierney
- Producer: Paul Begaud

Human Nature singles chronology
"Wishes" (1996)	"Don't Say Goodbye" (1997)	"Whisper Your Name" (1997)

Music video
- "Don't Say Goodbye" on YouTube

"Don't Say Goodbye" is a song by Human Nature, released as the fourth single from their album Telling Everybody on 9 March 1997 by Sony Music Records and Columbia Records. It was one of two singles by the group nominated for the 1997 ARIA Music Award for Highest Selling Single, along with "Wishes", but lost to Savage Garden's "Truly Madly Deeply". The song peaked at No. 8 in Australia, becoming their second top ten single.

== Track listing ==
=== Australian CD single ===
1. "Don't Say Goodbye" – 4:22
2. "Wishes" (Ak's Comfort Zone Mix) – 4:53
3. "September Girl" (US Acoustic Remix) – 3:51
- Barcode: 9399700031874

=== Australian remix single ===
1. "Don't Say Goodbye"
2. "Don't Say Goodbye" (Peewee Ferris Remix (Radio Edit))
3. "Don't Say Goodbye" (Pee Wee Ferris Remix)
4. "September Girl" (US acoustic remix)
- Barcode: 9399700036213

== Charts ==
=== Weekly charts ===
"Don't Say Goodbye" debuted at No. 10 in Australia in the week commencing March 16, 1997, peaking at No. 8 on April 20, 1997.

Chart (1997)	Peak position
Australia (ARIA)	8

=== Year-end charts ===
Chart (1997)	Position
Australia (ARIA)	57

== Sales and certifications ==
Region	Certification	Certified units/sales
Australia (ARIA)	Gold	35,000^{^}
^{^} Shipments figures based on certification alone.

== Awards ==
"Don't Say Goodbye" was nominated for an ARIA Music Award at the 1997 ceremony. It lost to "Truly Madly Deeply" by Savage Garden.

Year	Nominee / work	Award	Result
1997	"Don't Say Goodbye"	Highest Selling Single	Nominated
