= Don't Cry (Human Nature song) =

Single by Human Nature

from the album Counting Down
- A-side: "Don't Cry"
- B-side: "What If I Said"
- Released: June 1999
- Recorded: Studios 301, 1998
- Genre: Pop music
- Length: 4:01
- Label: Sony Music Records, Columbia Records
- Songwriters: Andrew Klippel, Alan Glas
- Producer: Andrew Klippel

Human Nature singles chronology
"Last to Know" (1999)	"Don't Cry" (1999)	"Eternal Flame" (1999)

"Don't Cry" is a song by Human Nature, released in June 1999 as the third single from their second studio album Counting Down (1999). The song peaked at No. 5 in Australia and was certified Gold.

== Track listing ==
CD single (666535.2)

1. "Don't Cry" (US Radio Remix) - 4:01
2. "What If I Said" - 3:49
3. "Last To Know" (Brothers Radio Remix) - 4:03
4. "Last To Know" (Discothèque Club Remix) - 6:43
5. "Don't Cry" (DIY Mix) - 4:27

== Charts ==
=== Weekly charts ===
Chart (1999)	Peak position
Australia (ARIA)	5

=== Year-end charts ===
Chart (1999)	Position
Australia (ARIA)	81

== Sales and certifications ==
Region	Certification	Certified units/sales
Australia (ARIA)	Gold	35,000^{^}
^{^} Shipments figures based on certification alone.
