= When You Say You Love Me (Human Nature song) =

2004 single by Human Nature

Single by Human Nature

from the album Walk the Tightrope
- Released: 12 April 2004
- Recorded: Sydney, Australia
- Genre: Pop
- Length: 4:01
- Label: Columbia
- Songwriter(s): Darren Hayes, Rick Nowels
- Producer(s): Rick Nowels

Human Nature singles chronology
"Always Be With You" (2001)	"When You Say You Love Me" (2004)	"Guilty (One in a Million)" (2004)

"When You Say You Love Me" is a song by Australian vocal group Human Nature, released as the first single from their fourth studio album, Walk the Tightrope (2004). It was written by Darren Hayes from Savage Garden and Rick Nowels, who also produced the track. The song was originally recorded in 2003 by Clay Aiken for his album Measure of a Man. Released on 12 April 2004, the song peaked at number seven in Australia.

== Music video ==
A music video was released to promote the song; with the group on a bus and performing the song at a petrol station.

== Track listing ==
Australian CD single

1. "When You Say You Love Me"
2. "When You Say You Love Me" (remix)

== Charts ==
=== Weekly charts ===
Chart (2004)	Peak position
Australia (ARIA)	7

=== Year-end charts ===
Chart (2004)	Position
Australia (ARIA)	56

== Certifications ==
Region	Certification	Certified units/sales
Australia (ARIA)	Gold	35,000^{^}
^{^} Shipments figures based on certification alone.
