= Dancing in the Street: The Songs of Motown II =

Studio album by Human Nature
- Released: 14 October 2006
- Recorded: 2006
- Genre: Pop
- Label: Sony BMG, Columbia

Human Nature chronology
| Reach Out: The Motown Record (2005) | Dancing in the Street: The Songs of Motown II (2006) | Get Ready (2007) |

Singles from Walk the Tightrope
- 1. "Uptight (Everything's Alright)" Released: 2007

Dancing in the Street: The Songs of Motown II is the sixth studio album by Australian pop vocal group Human Nature and second Motown covers release. It was released on 14 October 2006.

== Reception ==
Professional ratings
Review scores
| Source | Rating |
|---|---|
| AllMusic | 3.5/5 stars |

AllMusic's brief review said that the album achieved "a nice balance between updating the classic Motown sound for contemporary dance-pop fans while still remaining faithful to the original recordings."

== Track listing ==
1. "Dancing in the Street" (Marvin Gaye, William "Mickey" Stevenson, Ivy Jo Hunter) – 2:56
2. "Ain't No Mountain High Enough" (Nickolas Ashford, Valerie Simpson) – 2:44
3. "ABC" (Berry Gordy, Jr., Alphonso Mizell, Freddie Perren, Deke Richards) – 3:02
4. "Signed, Sealed, Delivered I'm Yours" (Stevie Wonder, Lee Garrett, Syreeta Wright, Lula Mae Hardaway) – 3:04
5. "You Can't Hurry Love" (Holland-Dozier-Holland) – 3:04
6. "Ain't Too Proud to Beg" (Norman Whitfield, Edward Holland, Jr.) – 2:56
7. "What's Going On" (Al Cleveland, Renaldo Benson, Marvin Gaye) – 3:52
8. "Uptight (Everything's Alright)" (Stevie Wonder, Sylvia Moy, Henry Cosby) – 3:11
9. "Please Mr. Postman" (Georgia Dobbins, William Garrett, Brian Holland, Robert Bateman, Freddie Gorman) – 2:48
10. "I Can't Get Next to You" (Norman Whitfield, Barrett Strong) – 2:54
11. "Midnight Train to Georgia" (Jim Weatherly) – 4:34
12. "I Can't Help Myself (Sugar Pie, Honey Bunch)" (Holland-Dozier-Holland) – 2:44
13. "What Becomes of the Broken Hearted" (William Weatherspoon, Paul Riser, James Dean) – 3:42
14. "Just My Imagination (Running Away With Me)" (Whitfield, Strong) – 3:46

== Personnel ==
- Glenn A. Baker – Liner Notes
- Ian Bell – Trombone
- Jessica Bell – Violin
- Grecco Buratto – Guitar
- Paul Bushnell – Bass
- David Caplice – Management
- David Champion – Management
- David Paul Jr. Collins – A&R
- Kieran Conrau – Trombone
- Jim Cox – Keyboards
- Tom Coyne – Mastering
- Shane Gillard – Trumpet
- Cameron Hill – Violin
- Hilbert Ho – Art Direction, Design
- Rachel Homburg – Violin
- Edwina Hookey – Violin
- Hannah Hookey – String Coordinator
- Helen Ireland – Viola
- Christina Katsimbardis – Violin
- Kylie Liang – Violin
- Benjamin Northey – Flute, Sax (Baritone), Sax (Soprano), String Arrangements, Brass Arrangement
- Michael Brooks Reid – Violin
- Forrester Savell – Bass Engineer, Drum Engineering
- Rafael Serrano – Assistant Engineer
- Gregg Spence – Trumpet
- Jay Dee Springbett – A&R
- Dave Way – Mixing
- Paul L. Wiltshire – Keyboards, Producer
- Jonathan Wong – Violin
- Victoria Wu – Producer, Vocal Editing

== Charts ==
| Chart (2006) | Peak position |
|---|---|
| Australian Albums (ARIA) | 1 |

== Certifications ==
| Region | Certification | Certified units/sales |
|---|---|---|
| Australia (ARIA) | 4× Platinum | 280,000^{‡} |
^{‡} Sales+streaming figures based on certification alone.
