= Reach Out: The Motown Record =

Studio album by Human Nature
- Released: 6 November 2005
- Recorded: Australia, United States
- Genre: Pop, R&B
- Label: Sony BMG, Columbia
- Producer: Paul Wiltshire

Human Nature chronology
Walk the Tightrope (2004)	Reach Out: The Motown Record (2005)	Dancing in the Street: the Songs of Motown II (2006)

Professional ratings
Review scores
Source	Rating
Allmusic	link

Reach Out: The Motown Record is Human Nature's fifth studio album released on 6 November 2005 by Sony BMG Music Entertainment. It won the 2006 ARIA Music Award for Highest Selling Album. It debuted at number #6 on the Australian ARIA Album Chart but worked its way up to #1. On the album, the band perform their own renditions of twelve soul music classics. The tracks include renditions of The Four Tops' "Reach Out I'll Be There", The Temptations' "My Girl", The Supremes' "Stop! In the Name of Love", The Jackson 5's "I'll Be There" and Marvin Gaye's "I Heard It Through the Grapevine". Produced by Paul Wiltshire for PLW Productions. Following an appearance on the New Zealand edition of Dancing with the Stars, the album debuted at #4 on the New Zealand albums chart more than a year after its release, climbing to its peak of #2 the following week.

The album represented a major new musical direction for the group, which had previously performed boy-band style pop. The change re-invigorated their popularity, resulting in their best sales in a decade.

== Track listing ==
#	Title	Composer(s)	Original Artist
1.	"Reach Out I'll Be There"	Brian Holland, Lamont Dozier, Edward Holland, Jr.	Four Tops
2.	"You Keep Me Hangin' On"	Holland, Dozier, Holland	The Supremes
3.	"Baby I Need Your Loving"	Holland, Dozier, Holland	Four Tops
4.	"If You Don't Know Me by Now"	Kenneth Gamble, Leon Huff	Harold Melvin & the Blue Notes
5.	"I Heard It Through the Grapevine"	Norman Whitfield, Barrett Strong	Gladys Knight & the Pips/Marvin Gaye
6.	"Twenty-Five Miles"	Edwin Starr, Harvey Fuqua, Johnny Bristol	Edwin Starr
7.	"I'll Be There"	Berry Gordy, Hal Davis, Willie Hutch, Bob West	The Jackson 5
8.	"My Girl"	Smokey Robinson, Ronnie White	The Temptations
9.	"I Want You Back"	The Corporation	The Jackson 5
10.	"Stop! In the Name of Love"	Holland, Dozier, Holland	The Supremes
11.	"You Are Everything"	Thom Bell, Linda Creed	The Stylistics/Marvin Gaye & Diana Ross
12.	"The Tracks of My Tears"	Marvin Tarplin, Robinson, Warren Moore	The Miracles

== Charts and certifications ==
=== Weekly charts ===
Chart (2005–2012)	Peak position
Australian Albums (ARIA)	1
New Zealand Albums (RMNZ)	2
US Billboard 200	120
US Heatseekers Albums (Billboard)	1

=== Year-end charts ===
Chart (2005)	Position
Australian Albums (ARIA)	29
Chart (2006)	Position
Australian Albums (ARIA)	3

=== Decade-end chart ===
Chart (2000–2009)	Position
Australian Albums (ARIA)	31

=== Certifications ===
Region	Certification	Certified units/sales
Australia (ARIA)	6× Platinum	420,000^{^}
New Zealand (RMNZ)	Gold	7,500^{^}
^{^} Shipments figures based on certification alone.

== See also ==
- List of top 25 albums for 2006 in Australia

== See also ==
- Young Divas
