= Everytime You Cry =

Single by John Farnham & Human Nature

from the album Anthology 1 and Counting Down
- Released: 1997
- Genre: Pop
- Length: 4:47
- Label: Sony BMG, RCA, Gotham
- Songwriters: Gregg Sutton, Shelly Peiken
- Producers: Ross Fraser, John Farnham & Andrew Klippel

John Farnham & Human Nature singles chronology
"All Kinds of People" (1997)	"Everytime You Cry" (1997)	"Trying to Live My Life Without You" (2000)

Human Nature singles chronology
"Whisper Your Name" (1997)	"Everytime You Cry" (1997)	"People Get Ready" (1997)

"Everytime You Cry" is a song by John Farnham and Human Nature. It was released as the lead single from John Farnham's Anthology 1 and also included on Human Nature's 1999 album, Counting Down. It was nominated for the 1998 ARIA Music award for Highest Selling Single but lost to The Living End's Second Solution / Prisoner of Society. It peaked at No. 3 on the ARIA Singles Chart. "Everytime You Cry" is Human Nature's highest-charting single in Australia.

The song was originally recorded during sessions for Romeo's Heart but left unfinished. It was finished for Anthology 1 with additional backing vocal overdubs from Human Nature, who recorded their vocals in London.

It was nominated for an ARIA Award in 1998, for highest selling single.

== Track listing ==
The CD single was released in 1997.

1. "Everytime You Cry" performed by John Farnham & Human Nature
2. "Everything Is Out of Season" performed by John Farnham
3. "You're the Voice" (swing version) performed by John Farnham with Melbourne Symphony Orchestra.

== Music video ==
The video had a retro feel, with a family watching Farnham and Human Nature performing the song on a television set, whilst eating a meal.

== Charts ==
=== Weekly charts ===
Chart (1997–1998)	Peak position
Australia (ARIA)	3
Germany (GfK)	84

=== Year-end chart ===
Chart (1997)	Position
Australia (ARIA)	28

== Certifications ==
Region	Certification	Certified units/sales
Australia (ARIA)	Platinum	70,000^{^}
^{^} Shipments figures based on certification alone.
