= Cruel (Human Nature song) =

Single by Human Nature

from the album Counting Down
- B-side: "Without You"
- Released: August 1998
- Recorded: 1998
- Genre: Pop
- Length: 4:11
- Label: Sony Music Records, Columbia Records
- Songwriter(s): Andrew Klippel, Shep Solomon
- Producer(s): Andrew Kippel

Human Nature singles chronology
"People Get Ready" (1996)	"Cruel" (1998)	"Last to Know" (1999)

Music video
- "Cruel" on YouTube

"Cruel" is a song by Human Nature, released as the lead single from their album second studio album Counting Down. The song peaked at No. 14 in Australia and was certified Gold. Human Nature performed the song live at the ARIA Music Awards of 1998 and on Hey Hey It's Saturday.

== Track listing ==
1. Cruel (Single Edit) (4:11)
2. Without You (LA Demo Session)
3. Cruel (Album Version) (5:16)

== Charts ==
=== Weekly charts ===
"Cruel" debuted and peaked at No. 14 in Australia.

Chart (1998)	Peak position
Australia (ARIA)	14

=== Year-end charts ===
Chart (1998)	Position
Australia (ARIA)	77
Australian Artist (ARIA)	8

== Sales and certifications ==
Region	Certification	Certified units/sales
Australia (ARIA)	Gold	35,000^{^}
^{^} Shipments figures based on certification alone.

== Credits ==
- Arranged By [Strings] – Jamie Muhoberac, Larry Muhoberac
- Drums [Additional] – Damien Wagner
- Engineer [Additional] – Nick Brophy
- Guitar – Joel, Shep Solomon
- Mixed By – Mick Guzauski
