= Wishes (Human Nature song) =

Single by Human Nature

from the album Telling Everybody
- B-side: "You Know"
- Released: October 1996
- Recorded: 1996; Sydney, Australia
- Genre: Pop
- Length: 4:06
- Label: Sony Music Records, Columbia Records
- Songwriters: Alan Glass, Andrew Klippel
- Producer: Andrew Klippel

Human Nature singles chronology
"Tellin' Everybody" (1996)	"Wishes" (1996)	"Don't Say Goodbye" (1997)

"Wishes" is a song by Human Nature, released as the third single from their album Telling Everybody. The song peaked at No. 6 in Australia, becoming their first top ten single, and peaked at No. 44 in the UK.

== Track listing ==
=== Australian single ===
1. "Wishes" (written by: Alan Glass & Andrew Klippel)
2. "Last Christmas" (written by: George Michael)
3. "You Know" (written by: Michael Tierney, Andrew Tierney & Paul Begaud)
4. "Wishes II" (written by: Alan Glass & Andrew Klippel)

=== European single ===
1. "Wishes"
2. "You Know" (written by: Michael Tierney, Andrew Tierney & Paul Begaud)

=== UK single ===
1. "Wishes" (album version) – 4:04
2. "Wishes" (Carl Mcintosh's R & B Mix) – 4:32
3. "Wishes" (Carl Mcintosh's Urban Alternative Mix) – 4:17
4. "Wishes" (Ak's Comfort Zone Mix) – 4:54
5. "Wishes" (a cappella) – 3:49

== Charts ==
=== Weekly charts ===
"Wishes" debuted at No. 43 in Australia in the week commencing October 27, 1996, before rising to a peak of No. 6 on January 12, 1997.

Chart (1996–97)	Peak position
Australia (ARIA)	6
Germany (GfK)	68
UK Singles (OCC)	44

=== Year-end charts ===
Chart (1996)	Position
Australia (ARIA)	60
Chart (1997)	Position
Australia (ARIA)	94

== Sales and certifications ==
Region	Certification	Certified units/sales
Australia (ARIA)	Platinum	70,000^{^}
^{^} Shipments figures based on certification alone.

== Awards ==
"Wishes" was nominated for an ARIA music award at the 1997 ceremony. It lost to "Truly Madly Deeply" by Savage Garden.

Year	Nominee / work	Award	Result
1997	"Wishes"	Highest Selling Single	Nominated
