= Human Nature (band) =

Australian boy band

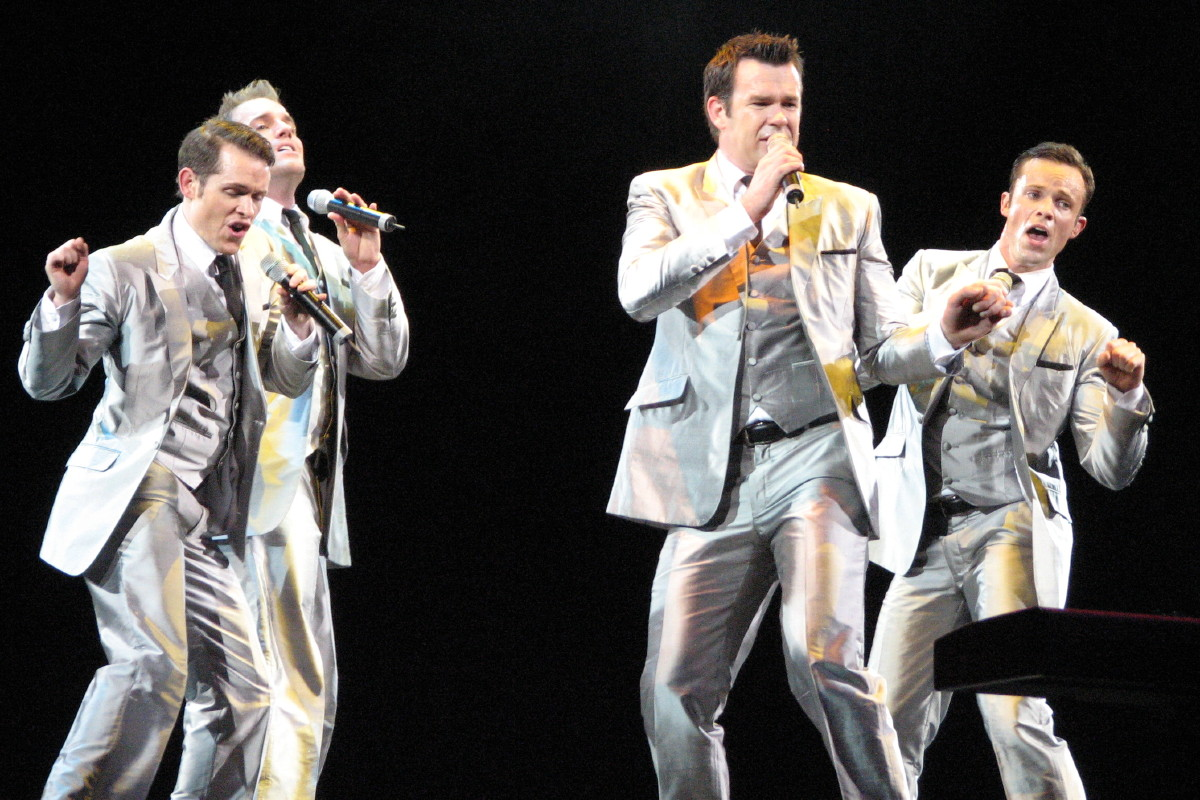
- Human Nature performing in Canberra, June 2007

Background information
- Also known as: The 4 Trax
- Origin: Sydney, New South Wales, Australia
- Genres: Doo-wop; pop; harmony pop
- Years active: 1989–present
- Labels: Sony; Columbia
- Members: Toby Allen; Phil Burton; Andrew Tierney; Michael Tierney
- Website: humannaturelive.com

Human Nature are an Australian pop vocal group which formed in 1989. They are a quartet featuring Toby Allen, Phil Burton and brothers, Andrew and Mike Tierney. Originally they were established as a doo-wop group called the 4 Trax, when the members were schoolmates.

After signing with Sony Music as Human Nature, they released their debut album, Telling Everybody, in 1996. Four of their albums have reached number one on the ARIA Albums Charts, Counting Down (May 1999), Reach Out: The Motown Record (November 2005), Dancing in the Street: The Songs of Motown II (October 2006) and Gimme Some Lovin': Jukebox Vol II (August 2016). Three other albums reached number two, Get Ready (November 2007), Jukebox (October 2014), and Romance of the Jukebox (August 2018).

Their top 10 hits on the related ARIA Singles Chart are "Wishes" (October 1996), "Don't Say Goodbye" (March 1997), "Everytime You Cry" (duet with John Farnham, October 1997), "Don't Cry" (July 1999), "Eternal Flame" (October 1999), "He Don't Love You" (November 2000) and "When You Say You Love Me" (April 2004). Three of their albums received multi-platinum certification from ARIA, while four others have received platinum, with a total shipment of over 1.6 million records in Australia, as of April 2011.

The group have toured both nationally and internationally including as a support act for Celine Dion on her Falling Into You Around the World Tour (March 1996, June 1997) and Let's Talk About Love World Tour (1998). They also opened for Michael Jackson on the HIStory World Tour (December 1996, early to mid-1997). At the ARIA Music Awards of 2006 they won Highest Selling Album for Reach Out: The Motown Record. In May 2009 they began a residency performing a Motown-themed show on the Las Vegas Strip and in April 2014 they completed their 1000th show. In November 2019 Human Nature were inducted into the ARIA Hall of Fame.

== History ==
=== Early career: The 4 Trax ===
Human Nature started as the 4 Trax in Sydney in late 1989 when Toby Allen (born 1973) and Phil Burton (born 1974) joined with brothers Andrew Tierney (born 1974) and Michael Tierney (born 1977). They represented Hurlstone Agricultural High School as well as a public school in Sydneys west, in a combined regional schools concert, the Schools Spectacular at the Bankstown Town Hall, on 27 November 1989. This event is still held annually featuring around 6000 NSW Public School students. All four members had choir backgrounds and were inspired by groups from the Motown era, including the Four Tops. In Bankstown, they had sung The Penguins' hit "Earth Angel". Andrew later told Megan Riggs of What's on Highway Radio that it was the only song they knew and they were encouraged to listen to more Motown groups.

After the elder three members had finished high school, Allen worked as a perfume salesman and studied courses in accounting and geology; Andrew studied physiotherapy for two years; and Burton was studying to be a music teacher. Mike, the youngest member of the group, was doing his Higher School Certificate in his final year of secondary school. The 4 Trax initially gave street performances in the doo-wop style, and after winning some talent quests, they began singing professionally in clubs and built a following. The group sent demo recordings to record labels. On a visit to Sony CEO, Denis Handlin, they performed an a cappella version of "People Get Ready", and landed a contract.

By 1995 the group felt the 4 Trax name was dated, so they brainstormed, thinking of alternatives: Mike suggested Human Nature. Allen said, "At first we thought it was probably a bit obvious, because it's such a well-used term, but then the more we lived with that we realized that it suited us. We were singing a cappella at the time, and it represented what we were about: Singing was our human nature."

=== Telling Everybody album (1996–1997) ===
On 1 March 1996 Human Nature released their first single, "Got It Goin' On", which reached No. 19 on the ARIA Singles Chart. It was co-written by the Tierney brothers with their producer, Paul Begaud. At the ARIA Music Awards of 1996 they received their first nomination, for Best Talent for "Got It Goin' On". In July 1996, they followed up with "Tellin' Everybody", again written by Andrew Tierney, Michael Tierney and producer Paul Begaud, which reached the top 30. The third single, "Wishes" (27 September), peaked at No. 6 and gave them their first platinum certification from ARIA. "Wishes" was co-written by Alan Glass with its producer, Andrew Klippel (ex-member of Euphoria).

They had opened for Celine Dion on the Australian leg of her Falling Into You Around the World Tour in March 1996. They were a support act for the tour's European leg: visiting Ireland, England, France, Belgium, Austria and Switzerland in June 1997. They opened for her next world tour, Let's Talk About Love, in 1998, at the concerts in South Korea and Japan.

On 2 December 1996, Human Nature released their debut album, Telling Everybody, which reached No. 7 on the ARIA Albums Chart and remained in the top 50 for 64 weeks. It also reached the top 100 on both the German and the Japanese Albums Charts. Eight of its twelve tracks were produced by Paul Begaud and the other four by Klippel. According to Australian musicologist, Ian McFarlane, it "brimmed with silky smooth dance-pop and blue-eyed soul." On the ARIA End of Year Albums Chart it reached No. 11. Christie Eliezer of Billboard listed the album at number 9 in his top 10 for the year, declaring that it had "Stunning R&B vocals." He opined that outside Australia the group's "three strongest markets outside are Japan, Germany and Taiwan."

Human Nature received attention from Sony label mate, Michael Jackson (they were an opening act for the Australian leg of the HIStory World Tour in November and December 1996). Mike Tierney told G Mintern of The Times in November, "Well its totally amazing, and a real coup for us and a great opportunity to showcase our music to a large number of people." They continued opening for Jackson on the European leg through early 1997. They sang at venues numbering over 100,000 people, and at Wembley Stadium for three nights. In an interview in July 2009 with Radar Online's reporter, Andrew described touring with Jackson: "[it] was an incredible break for us ... We learned so much from seeing him perform that many times and experienced things that have shaped us into the entertainers we are today. He was the ultimate artist and so inspiring." In April and May 1997 they toured United Kingdom supporting local girl group Eternal. In June 1998 they issued a VHS, Human Nature – Telling Everybody... The Story, produced and directed by Ross Wood, which contained footage of their European and Japanese 1997 tours supporting Dion, Jackson and Eternal.

Additional singles from Telling Everybody are "Don't Say Goodbye" (March 1997, Peaking at No. 8), "Whisper Your Name" (with both songs having been co-written by Andrew Tierney, Michael Tierney, Paul Begaud) and produced by Begaud. (August, No. 18), and "People Get Ready" (November, top 40). The album achieved triple-platinum status in 1997. At the ARIA Music Awards of 1997 they received nominations for Best Pop Release and Producer of the Year (Paul Begaud) for "Telling Everybody", Highest Selling Single for both "Don't Say Goodbye" and "Wishes", and Breakthrough Artist – Album for Telling Everybody. At the ceremony, in September, they debuted their single, "Everytime You Cry", which was a duet with John Farnham. In the following month Human Nature undertook their own national concert tour.

=== Counting Down album (1998–1999) ===
Human Nature and Farnham's duet single, "Every Time You Cry", peaked at No. 3 and stayed for 15 weeks in the ARIA top 50. The group received a nomination at the ARIA Music Awards of 1998 for Producer of the Year for Paul Begaud's work on "Whisper Your Name" and another for Highest Selling Single (with Farnham) for "Every Time You Cry". They later performed with Farnham on his I Can't Believe He's 50 Tour in April–May 1999. In December 1998 they supported Janet Jackson's tour of Australia.

Their second album, Counting Down, was released on 25 May 1999, which consists of sessions recorded in Sydney, London, and Los Angeles, and used the production team from the first album, along with international songwriters and producers. It debuted at Number One (#1) on the ARIA charts, remained in the top 50 for 26 weeks and was certified platinum by the end of the following year. McFarlane described it as "smooth R&B pop". Eliezer declared that its number-one status "sent the right signal to other territories about the vocal quartet."

"Every Time You Cry" was included on the album and five other singles charted in the ARIA top 40: "Cruel" (September 1998, No. 1 "Last to Know" (March 1999, No. 14), "Don't Cry" (July, No. 5), "Eternal Flame" (October, No. 8) – a cover version of the 1989 hit by The Bangles – and "Be There with You", the later was again written by the Tierney brothers and Paul Begaud and produced by Begaud. (April 2000, No. 40) Andrew and Michael co-wrote "She's Taken My Words" – the B-side for "Last to Know" – which was used as the theme song for Australian feature film, Paperback Hero (March 1999). Human Nature were the first Australian group, and as of October 2007, the only one to have six top 40 hits from the one album. All except "Be There with You" received gold certification in Australia.

Human Nature went on an Australian concert tour of symphonic versions of Beatles' songs, conducted by George Martin. In October 1999 they had roles in a stage version of Happy Days: The Arena Mega-Musical, playing a 1950s vocal group, the Naturals. At the ARIA Music Awards of 1999 they were nominated for Best Pop Release for Counting Down; Producer of the Year (Paul Begaud) for "Now That I Found You", "Depend on Me", "Last to Know", "Be There with You"; and Highest Selling Single for "Last to Know".

=== Self-titled and greatest hits albums (2000–2003) ===
Human Nature's third album was eponymously titled and released on 1 December 2000. It was recorded in Sydney, London, Stockholm, Los Angeles and New York. It included "It's Gonna Be a Long Night" which was co-written by the Tierney brothers with Gary Barlow of Take That. Its lead single, "He Don't Love You" (November 2000), reached the Top 20 in the UK Singles Chart and No. 7 in Australia to become the second best selling Australasian single for that year. Tim Cashmere of Undercover Media described their "clean cut image that appeals to teens with full parental approval."

On 15 September Human Nature performed the Australian National Anthem at the opening ceremonies of the 2000 Summer Olympics with singer Julie Anthony and musician James Morrison. In November they made a guest appearance on the Australian TV soap opera, Neighbours, where they sang "He Don't Love You" at Erinsborough High's debutante ball, and "Wishes" a cappella at the ball's after party.

On 16 November 2001 Human Nature released their first greatest hits album, Here & Now: The Best of Human Nature, featuring 17 tracks, three of which had not been on previous albums. It reached No. 11 on the ARIA Albums Chart. Their single, "Always Be With You", peaked in the top 30. Its related music video featured a comic character, Guido Hatzis. At the ARIA Music Awards of 2001 "He Don't Love You" was nominated for Highest Selling Single and Best Video (directed by Mark Hartley).

From August 2002 to early 2003 Allen portrayed the Emcee in a production of the musical, Cabaret. He used temporary tattoos and dyed black hair; in a stark contrast to the "clean-cut" image associated with the group. Jo Roberts of The Age described how "he prowls around the stage like a wild animal on heat; muscular, handsome and lascivious with dyed black hair, tattoos and androgynous, wet, red lips. He's an eye magnet, whether centre stage or lurking in the shadows with an expression of wicked intent." Allen won a Helpmann Award for his performance. For the duration of the musical play's run Human Nature were in hiatus. On 25 June 2003 the group sang the national anthem at Game 2 of the Rugby League State of Origin match at Stadium Australia.

=== Walk the Tightrope, Motown cover albums (2004–2007) ===
Human Nature released their fourth studio album, Walk the Tightrope, on 26 April 2004, which reached No. 12. Andrew explained, "With this record, we wanted to take a bit of a chance, do things we haven't done before. Break the Human Nature mould." Cashmere felt that while it is "littered with great vocal harmonization... it's just a bummer about the songs... they haven't exactly pushed the boundaries of artistic endeavor, but they have once again laid down some magnificent vocals backed by some of the world's top production." Amazon.com's editor opined that they "have never sounded better. A blend of Bee Gees groove inspired dance floor tracks, upbeat pop numbers and gorgeous ballads."

Its first single "When You Say You Love Me", co-written by Darren Hayes (ex-Savage Garden) and Rick Nowels, is a cover version of Clay Aiken's album track. In April 2004 it reached No. 7 in Australia. The track, "Love Is Blind", was written by the Bee Gees in 1998, but it had not been previously released by any artist. The album also features a reworking of "Guilty (One in a Million)" by Barry Gibb and Barbra Streisand, and a cover of "To Be with You", a 1992 hit by glam metal band Mr. Big. "Guilty" reached the top 40.

In May 2005 Allen portrayed Kenickie in, another musical, Grease The Arena Spectacular. John Shand of The Sydney Morning Herald declared that Allen "seemed wasted" in his role.

For their fifth studio album, Reach Out: The Motown Record (7 November 2005), the group focused on Motown cover versions. AllMusic's Matt Collar found the tracks were "well-produced and reverent reworkings of the original '60s versions that should appeal to both aficionados of Motown soul and longtime Human Nature fans." Eliezer, now writing for In Music & Media, described it as "nannabait" which provided "something of a late-career revival." Burton explained their development, "We've gone through the Telling Everybody and the boy band phase – as you said – but now we're showing everyone how we got to where we are and that's by listening to this type of music. It really suits us."

Reach Out debuted at No. 6, and, five weeks later, reached number one on the ARIA Album Chart; it remained in the top 50 for 56 weeks. It peaked at No. 2 in New Zealand – their highest-charting album outside Australia. It received 6× Platinum certification in 2007 from ARIA for shipment of over 420,000 units. In 2006 they performed across Australia on their Motown Show Tour with special guest, Doug Parkinson.

Both Allen and Burton have appeared in reality TV shows: Allen in the fourth season of Channel 7's Dancing with the Stars (May 2006) – finishing third – Burton in the second season of Nine Network's Celebrity Overhaul (January 2007). Both Allen and Burton appeared on 19 March 2006 episode of Channel 10's Australia's Brainiest series where they competed for the title of Australia's Brainiest Musician: Burton won and Allen was a runner-up.

On 29 October 2006 Human Nature won the ARIA Award for Highest Selling Album for Reach Out: The Motown Record. It was their first win from 15 nominations in their 18 years together. Human Nature performed at the ceremony, ARIA provided a summary, "[the] lads delivered a fine medley of Motown hits and, in their sharp blue suits, were easily the best-dressed blokes in the room."

With the success of Reach Out, Human Nature continued with the Motown theme by releasing their sixth studio album, Dancing in the Street: the Songs of Motown II, on 13 October 2006. Collar noticed that they "find a nice balance between updating the classic Motown sound for contemporary dance-pop fans while still remaining faithful to the original recordings." Eliezer reported that with its predecessor "Motown tunes revive Human Nature." It debuted at number one on the ARIA Album Chart and was certified 3× Platinum for 2006. Dancing in the Street was nominated at the ARIA Music Awards of 2007 for Best Selling Album. They followed the album with an Australian arena tour in June and July 2007, with pop singer, Paulini, as the support act.

On 24 November 2007 Human Nature released their third Motown-themed album, Get Ready, which featured appearances by several original Motown artists: Smokey Robinson, Martha Reeves and Mary Wilson (The Supremes, The Temptations). Robinson flew to Australia for its release, and performed with the group on Dancing with the Stars and Sunrise. The album reached number two on the ARIA Albums Chart and was certified platinum. Their three Motown-themed albums, with a total of ten platinum certifications, have shipped over 700,000 copies in Australia.

=== American breakthrough (2008–2013) ===
In 2008 Human Nature performed for the first time in the United States, with a two-month engagement at Atlantic City's Tropicana Casino. In April they performed with Mary Wilson on the Australian TV show, It Takes Two, where they sang two duets from their Get Ready album: "It Takes Two" and "River Deep, Mountain High". Sony issued a compilation box set, The Motor City Collection, on 19 April 2008 – to coincide with Wilson's duets – which peaked at No. 18.

The group teamed with their previous producer Eliot Kennedy to record their ninth studio album, A Symphony of Hits, with the Prague Philharmonic Orchestra. It was released on 10 November 2008, which peaked at No. 10. Adam Greenberg of AllMusic explained that "[t]he vocals are consistently strong, though they are undeniably of the boy band variety. There's melodramatic emotion pumped into everything here. While it works well for some of the ballads (the Bangles' 'Eternal Flame' in particular comes off well), it can seem a little much for the bouncier tracks." Three performances at the Sydney Opera House were next in mid-December, fronting the Sydney Symphony Orchestra and conducted by Guy Noble. They performed with the Melbourne Symphony Orchestra in Melbourne (February 2009), and the West Australian Symphony Orchestra in Perth (February–March).

In May 2009 Human Nature became the second Australian group to have a residency on the Las Vegas Strip (The Four Kinsmen were the first, from 1996) when they began a year-long engagement at the Imperial Palace Hotel and Casino. At the premiere of the show, Smokey Robinson Presents: Human Nature, Robinson told Las Vegas Weekly reporter, Robin Leach that "They were bigger than the Beatles in Australia, New Zealand and Asia. I've never met four harder working, finely tuned singers. They are set to become major stars here now, and I'm proud to present them in Vegas."

On 12 December they returned to Australia for a homecoming show with Robinson and Jessica Mauboy at the Wyndham Estate winery in the Hunter Region. In May 2010 the Imperial Palace extended the group's engagement by two years, and also renamed their venue, as Human Nature Theatre. Las Vegas mayor, Oscar Goodman, also decreed that 11 May 2010 is to be known as Human Nature Day.

Human Nature released their ninth studio album, Vegas: Songs from Sin City, in November 2010, which reached the ARIA top 30. Vegas contains cover versions that are either about the city or have been performed by headliners past and present. It includes a duet with current Vegas headliner, Barry Manilow. On 27 November they performed two Elvis Presley covers, "A Little Less Conversation" and "Viva Las Vegas", complete with Vegas showgirls, on the final episode of Australian TV show, Hey Hey It's Saturday. They received a presentation award which coincided with their 21st anniversary of performing.

In December 2010 the band embarked on the Direct from Las Vegas! Australian Symphony Tour where they visited five state capital cities and played with the associated state symphony orchestra. Again, they worked with the Sydney, Melbourne, and West Australian Symphony Orchestras. Also, for the first time, they performed with the Adelaide, Tasmanian and Queensland Symphony Orchestras.

In celebration of their 500th show at the Imperial Palace on 30 June 2011, Human Nature recorded a full-length PBS concert special, Human Nature Sings Motown with Special Guest Smokey Robinson at the Paris Theatre at Paris Las Vegas on 6–7 July. The special was produced by Ken Ehrlich, and was broadcast in December 2011 on 85% of the country's PBS stations. Andrew comments in their article for Las Vegas Review-Journal, "Basically, ever since we started working in Vegas, everyone was telling us we should do a PBS special." and that "We'd like more people when they arrive in Vegas to have heard of Human Nature."

On 6 March 2012 Human Nature released a DVD of the PBS concert, and also their first US album, The Motown Record, featuring more Motown tracks. Allen told Brian McCollum of the Detroit Free Press, "Everybody loves (Motown), which is testament to what it achieved. As Berry Gordy would say, they didn't seek to make just black music – they wanted to make music for everybody. I look out at our shows, and it's people from all over the world, all genders and ages. It's pretty remarkable." and that "to have (Smokey Robinson) get involved so heavily with what we were doing was such a big justification for us, that we were doing something OK with this music and not ruining it." The album reached number 120 on the Billboard Top 200, but reached number one on the Motown Chart, and number one on the Billboard Heatseeker Chart.

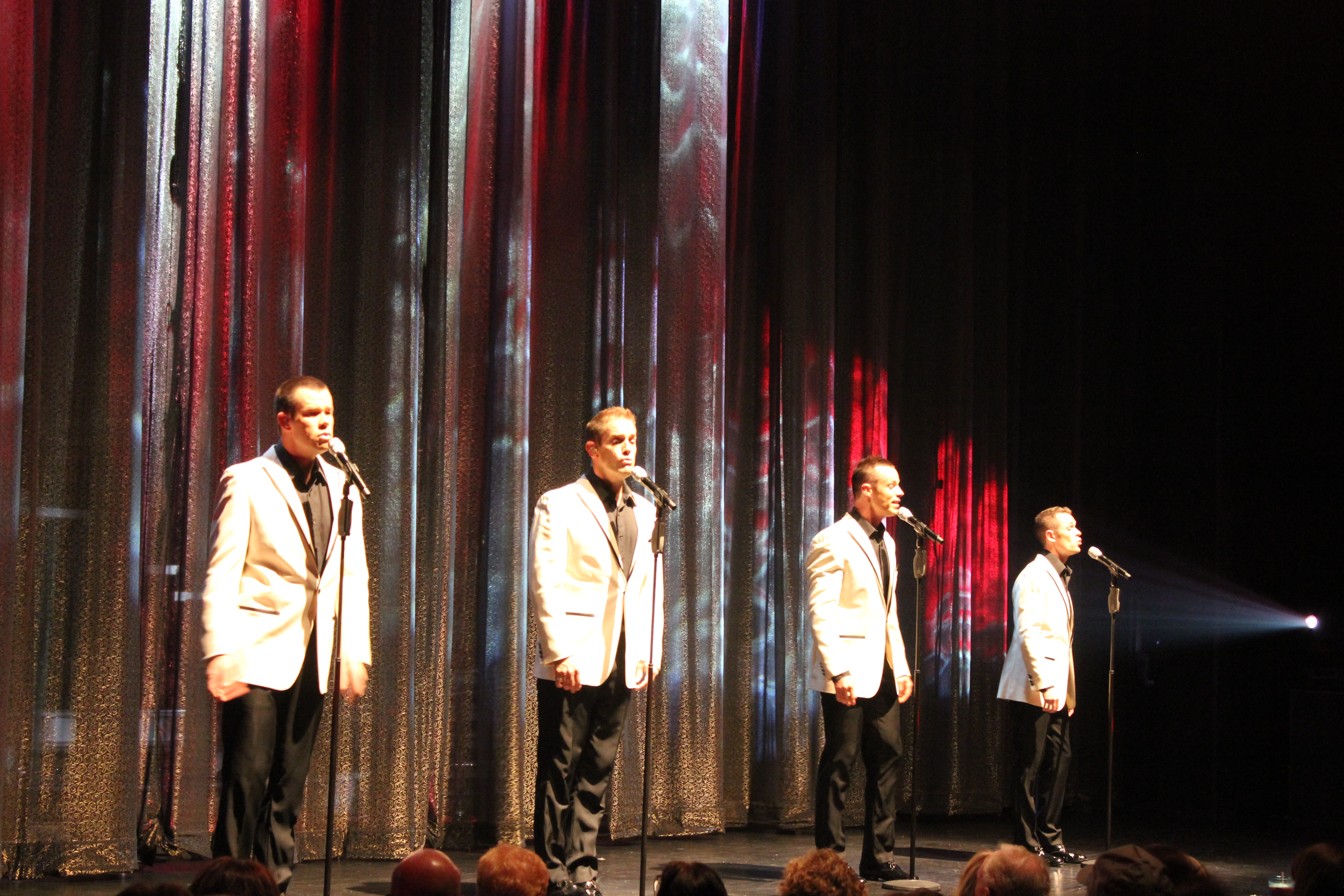
Performing in Las Vegas, May 2012

After the releases, there was a tour to raise money for PBS affiliates and to improve awareness of the group in America. Their first stop, on 24 March, was at Detroit, the original home of Motown, at the Fisher Theatre. They appeared on the 23 April broadcast of the American ABC's Dancing with the Stars, alongside Motown artists, Robinson, Martha Reeves and the Temptations. The tour included visits to Chicago, Washington D.C., Boston and New York City. For the east coast tour they used their Vegas backing band, the Funk Foundation.

In December 2012 the group toured Australia, again teaming up with symphony orchestras including the Adelaide and Melbourne Symphony Orchestras; they performed in Sydney and the Gold Coast with Philharmonia Australia.

Human Nature signed a two-year deal with Venetian Hotel and Casino beginning a residency there in January 2013. The group performed the Smokey Robinson presents Human Nature: The Motown Show five nights a week at the Sands Showroom.

=== The Christmas Album & Jukebox albums (2013–2018) ===
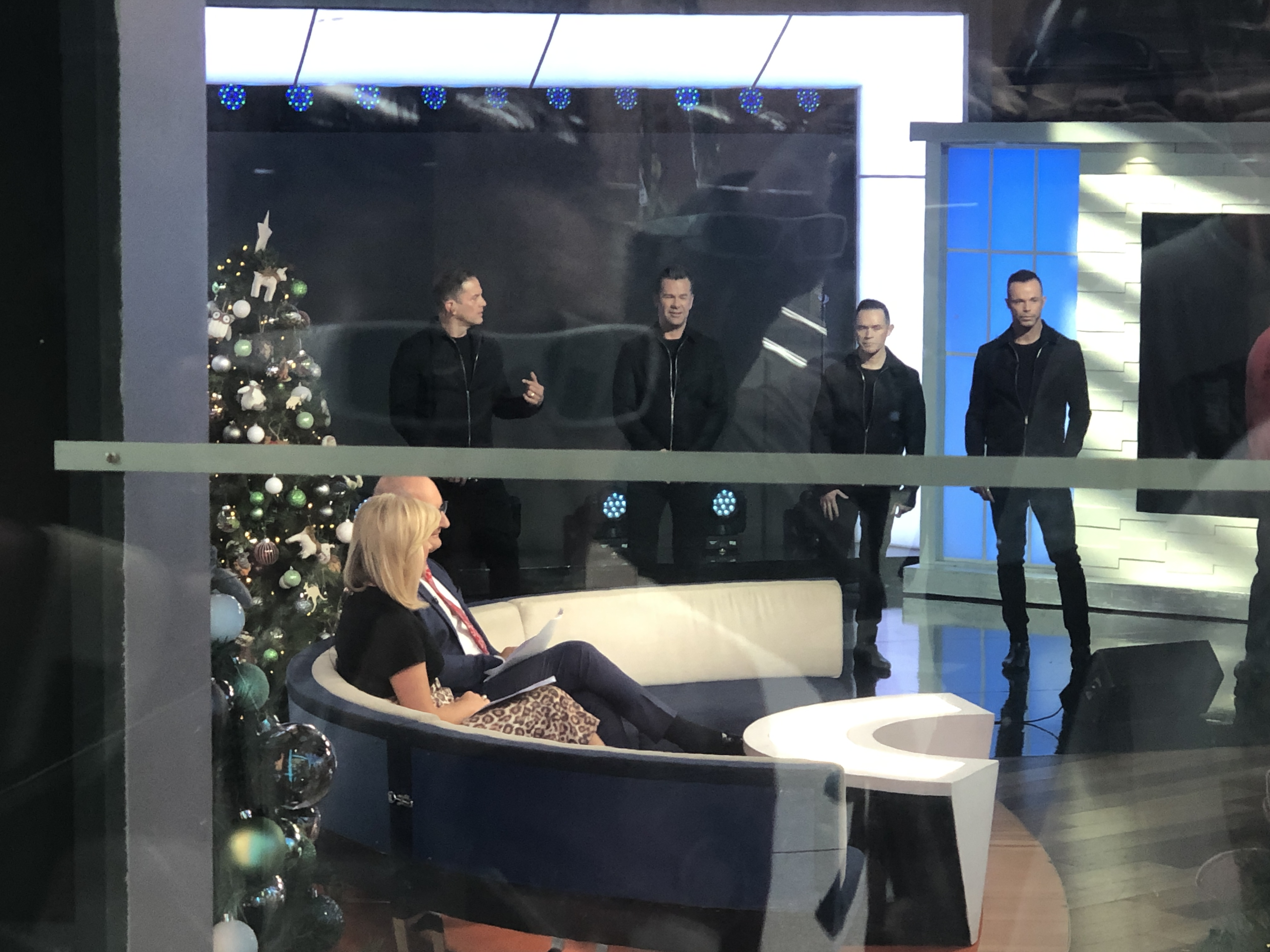
The band performing on Sunrise in 2019.

In November 2013 Human Nature released The Christmas Album, which reached No. 4 on the ARIA Albums Chart, and No. 13 on the Billboard Top Heatseekers. They promoted it with a 10-date Australian tour in December. On 10 April 2014 they played their 1000th show in Vegas, with Robinson joining them on stage. In September they appeared on Australian TV's Sunrise to promote their concept album, Jukebox, featuring cover versions of tracks from the 1950s and 1960s. It debuted at No. 2. In 2016, the band released Gimme Some Lovin': Jukebox Vol II. In August 2018 the band released their thirteenth studio album, Romance of the Jukebox, which peaked at number 2 on the ARIA Charts.

=== Order of Australia and ARIA Hall of Fame (2019) ===
At the 2019 Australia Day Honours, each of the four members of Human Nature received the Medal of the Order of Australia (General Division), with the citation, "for service to the performing arts as an entertainer." In April 2019 Human Nature celebrated their 30th anniversary with a Little More Love tour. It provided their biggest live shows and commenced in the Gold Coast and concluded in Sydney. In November of that year the group were inducted into the ARIA Hall of Fame and sang a medley of their tracks, "Don't Say Goodbye", "He Don't Love You", "Dancing in the Street", and "Everytime You Cry". A compilation album, titled Still Telling Everybody: 30 Years of Hits was released in November 2019 and peaked at number 3 on the ARIA Charts.

On 2 February 2020, the group premiered a brand new single titled "Nobody Just Like You" at the 2020 Australian Open men's final.

== Band members ==
- Toby Allen – bass vocals (1989–present)
- Phil Burton – baritone vocals, keyboard, guitar (1989–present)
- Andrew Tierney – lead vocals, keyboard (1989–present)
- Michael Tierney – tenor vocals (1989–present)

== Discography ==
Studio albums

- Telling Everybody (1996)
- Counting Down (1999)
- Human Nature (2000)
- Walk the Tightrope (2004)
- Reach Out: The Motown Record (2005)
- Dancing in the Street: the Songs of Motown II (2006)
- Get Ready (2007)
- A Symphony of Hits (2008)
- Vegas: Songs from Sin City (2010)
- The Christmas Album (2013)
- Jukebox (2014)
- Gimme Some Lovin': Jukebox Vol II (2016)
- Romance of the Jukebox (2018)

== Tours ==
All Human Nature tours in Australia.

=== Main tours ===
- Here and Now (with Bardot) (2002)
- Reach Out (2006)
- Gimme Some Lovin' (2017)
- Romance (2019)

=== Woolworths' Carols in the Domain ===
In 2006, Human Nature were at Carols in the Domain at The Domain, Sydney.

== Awards ==
=== ARIA Awards ===
The ARIA Music Awards is an annual awards ceremony held by the Australian Recording Industry Association to recognise excellence, innovation, and achievement across all genres of Australian music. Human Nature has achieved one win (in 2006) from sixteen nominations. In 2019 they were inducted into the ARIA Hall of Fame.

Year	Nominee / work	Award	Result	reference
1996	"Got It Goin' On"	Best New Talent	Nominated	
1997	Telling Everybody	Breakthrough Artist – Album	Nominated	
1997	Telling Everybody	Best Pop Release	Nominated	
1997	Telling Everybody – Paul Begaud	Producer of the Year	Nominated	
1997	"Don't Say Goodbye"	Highest Selling Single	Nominated	
1997	"Wishes"	Highest Selling Single	Nominated	
1998	"Every Time You Cry" (John Farnham and Human Nature)	Highest Selling Single	Nominated	
1998	"Whisper Your Name" – Paul Begaud	Producer of the Year	Nominated	
1999	"Last to Know"	Highest Selling Single	Nominated	
1999	Counting Down	Best Pop Release	Nominated	
1999	"Now That I Found You", "Depend on Me", "Last to Know", "Be There with You" – Paul Begaud (and for other work)	Producer of the Year	Nominated	
2001	"He Don't Love You"	Highest Selling Single	Nominated	
2001	"He Don't Love You" – Mark Hartley (and for other work)	Best Video	Nominated	
2006	Reach Out: The Motown Record	Highest Selling Album	Won	
2006	Reach Out: The Motown Record	Best Adult Contemporary Album	Nominated	
2007	Dancing in the Street: The Songs of Motown II	Highest Selling Album	Nominated	
2019	Human Nature	ARIA Hall of Fame	Inducted	

=== Helpmann Awards ===
The Helpmann Awards is an awards show, celebrating live entertainment and performing arts in Australia, presented by industry group Live Performance Australia since 2001. Note: 2020 and 2021 were cancelled due to the COVID-19 pandemic.

Year	Nominee / work	Award	Result	Ref.
2006	The Motown Show	Best Performance in an Australian Contemporary Concert	Nominated	

=== Medal of the Order of Australia ===
For the 2019 Australia Day Honours, on 26 January, each of the four members of Human Nature received the Medal of the Order of Australia (General Division), with the citation, "for service to the performing arts as an entertainer."

=== Mo Awards ===
The Australian Entertainment Mo Awards (commonly known informally as the Mo Awards), were annual Australian entertainment industry awards. They recognise achievements in live entertainment in Australia from 1975 to 2016. Human Nature won six awards in that time.

Year	Nominee / work	Award	Result (wins only)
1992	The 4 Trax	Johnny O'Keefe Encouragement Award	Won
1994	The 4 Trax	Variety Group of the Year	Won
1994	The 4 Trax	Variety Performer of the Year	Won
1997	Human Nature	Australian Performer of the Year	Won
2001	Human Nature	Contemporary Rock Performer of the Year	Won
2002	Human Nature	Contemporary Rock Performer of the Year	Won
