= Paul Begaud =

Australian singer/songwriter

Paul Begaud OAM
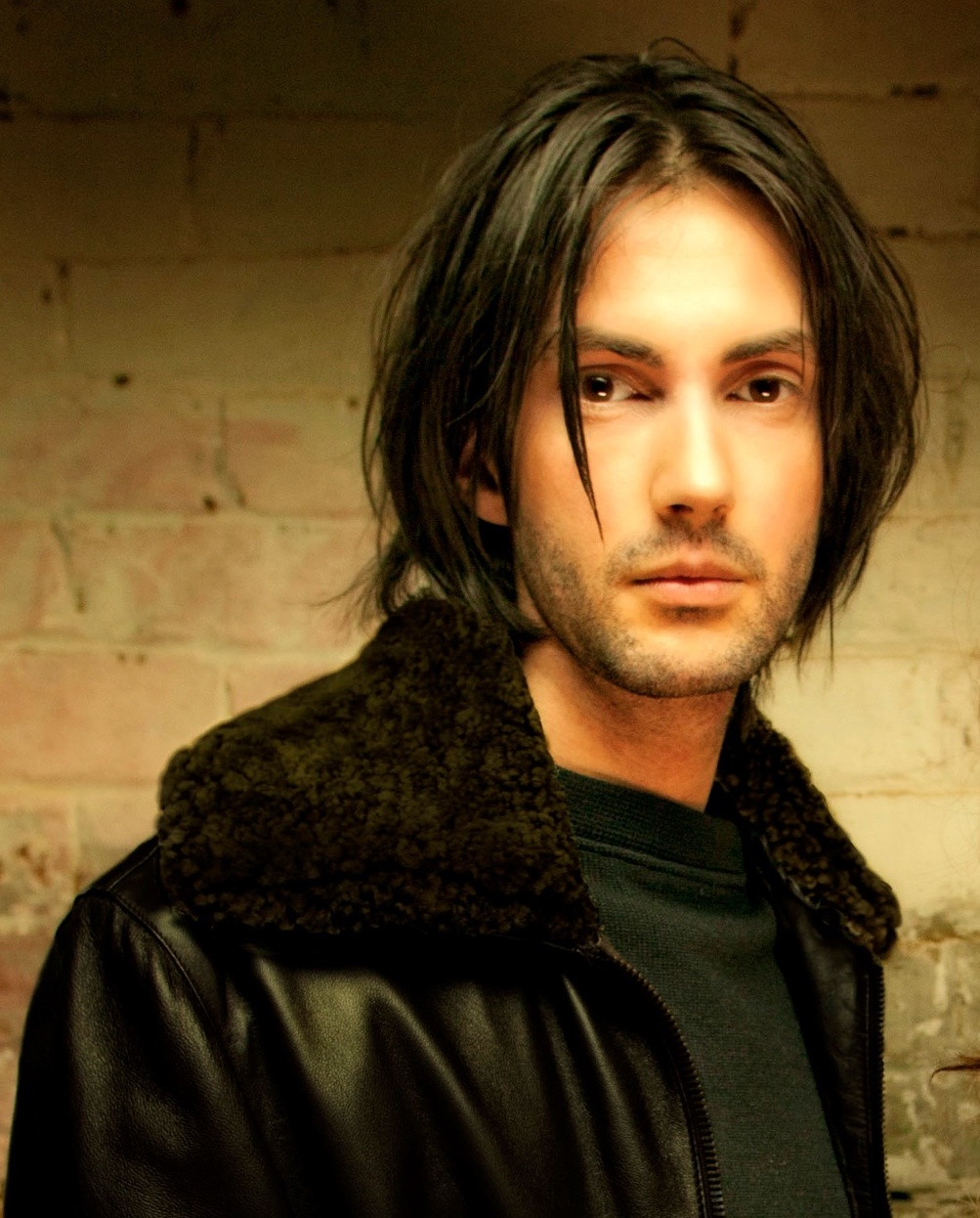

Background information
- Also known as: Paul Bennett
- Born: Sydney, New South Wales, Australia
- Genres: Pop; rock; R&B; country
- Occupations: Songwriter; record producer; singer
- Years active: 1993–present
- Labels: Sony; EMI; Universal; BMG

Paul Begaud is an Australian singer, songwriter, and record producer. He has written and/or produced songs for artists including Delta Goodrem, Tina Arena, Human Nature, Terri Clark, Honeyz, R&B Singer Selwyn, Donny Osmond and country hall of fame star Wynonna Judd. Begaud's most notable songs include the US Country #1 "Now That I Found You" recorded by Terri Clark and the UK R&B #1 "End of the Line" (UK top 5) recorded by British girl group Honeyz. Begaud also composed the song "Dare to Dream" for the Sydney Olympic Games Opening Ceremony performed by Olivia Newton-John and John Farnham before a global audience of 4.5 billion. Begaud is a 3 x ARIA Producer of the Year nominee.

== Early life ==
Begaud started singing and performing professionally at age twelve as a member of Australian children's group the Keane Kids. The group performed in clubs and on television throughout Australia. Other notable members of the group included TV celebrity Toni Pearen.

== Career ==
Begaud went on to sign a solo recording contract with the Ariola label of BMG releasing music in Australia and also under the pseudonym Paul Bennett (Bennett is Begaud's mother's maiden name) in Asia and Germany, and leading to a nomination for the Bravo Otto award for best male singer alongside Michael Jackson and Prince. His best known song is "Forevermore" which was a massive hit in Asia. "Forevermore" has amassed more than 4 million views on YouTube. "Forevermore" was covered by Filipino singer Jed Madela on his 2007 album Only Human.

Begaud's debut solo single, released under his real name, was the track "Everybody (Celebrate the Night Away)" on the BMG label. The accompanying maxi-CD and 12" vinyl featured a selection of New York remixes by Acar S. Key, also renowned for his work with artists like Whitney Houston, Mariah Carey, Alicia Keys, and C+C Music Factory. The release also included the song "Run and Hide", an original composition written and produced by Begaud.

Begaud's other solo releases (under the pseudonym Paul Bennett) include the singles "This Is Real Love", "I Don't Wanna Cry Again", as well as the full-length album Forevermore, which was also accompanied by the single of the same name.

== Record producing and songwriting ==
Begaud's first success as a record producer came with Australian boy band Human Nature. Begaud worked with the group for a year before they were signed to Sony Music, co-writing their songs and developing their sound. Human Nature's first album "Telling Everybody" went 4 x platinum and was a major success for the band and Begaud. Begaud co-wrote and produced 7 tracks on the album, including hit singles "Got It Goin' On", "Tellin' Everybody", "Whisper Your Name" and "Don't Say Goodbye". "Don't Say Goodbye" was nominated for Highest Selling Single at the ARIA Music Awards. Begaud has contributed on several Human Nature hit albums.

Begaud's American Country number one hit "Now That I Found You" (Terri Clark) was co-written with songwriters Vanessa Corish and JD Martin. The song was awarded ASCAP and BMI (Broadcast Music, Inc.) performance awards along with the prestigious BMI Million-Air award which denotes in excess of 1 million airplays in the US alone.

Begaud, along with Corish and Wayne Tester composed "Dare to Dream" especially for the Sydney Olympic Games Opening Ceremony. Olivia Newton-John and John Farnham walked among the Olympic competitors in what is remembered as a memorable and emotional Olympic moment.

Begaud, again along with writing partner Vanessa Corish composed and produced the Song Of Peace for the 2006 Asian Games held in Doha, Qatar. The song entitled "Reach Out" was performed at the Opening Ceremony by renowned Bollywood playback singer Sunidhi Chauhan. The Asian Games are the largest sporting event in the world after the Summer Olympic Games. The Opening Ceremony held in Qatar were watched by an estimated three billion people across Asia and the world, making the Ceremonies of the Doha 2006 Asian Games the biggest branding exercise ever undertaken by any Arab nation.

Begaud has also written and/or produced songs for a number of Australia's top selling country artists including Golden Guitar winners Troy Cassar-Daley, Melinda Schneider, and Felicity Urquhart.

On 27 March 2015 Begaud's song "End of the Line" (Honeyz) was selected by UK's Official Charts website as the number one "Ultimate Goodbye Song". Runner-up songs on the list included Beyonce's "Irreplaceable", Mariah Carey's "Always Be My Baby", Spice Girls "Goodbye" and N-Sync's "Bye Bye Bye". "End of the Line" climbed to the number one position on the UK R&B Chart and was a top five hit on the UK singles chart, spending 16 weeks in the top 100 to become Honeyz' longest-charting single.

In 2023, Australian Indigenous singer Jess Hitchcock recorded and released Begaud's song "I Don't Have the Heart", co-written with Vanessa Corish and Tina Arena. The song was the first single from Hitchcock's album Unbreakable and was described by The Music as "an arena sized pop ballad".

== Music executive and A&R consultant ==
Begaud has provided A&R consultancy services to major music labels, discovering new talent, offering creative advice and developing artists.

== Awards and nominations ==
On 26 January 2025, Paul Begaud was appointed a Member of the Order of Australia and awarded the Medal of the Order of Australia (OAM) in the 2025 Australia Day Honours "For service to the music industry as a songwriter and producer."

- ARIA 3 x Producer Of the Year Nominee
- BMI (Broadcast Music, Inc.) Performance Award Winner "Now That I Found You"
- BMI (Broadcast Music, Inc.) Million-Air Award Recipient "Now That I Found You" (BMI Million-Air Awards are given to the songwriters whose works have achieved the rare feat of surpassing one million broadcast performances on U.S. radio)
- APRA Most Performed Australian Work Nominee
- APRA Most Performed Dance Work Nominee
- ASCAP Country Music Award Winner
- Australian Country Music People's Choice Awards Winner for 'Best Song' for "Story Of My Life (2003)"
- ARIA, CRIA, BPI, RIAA Certified Multi-Gold and Multi-Platinum Records, Various Countries
