= Michael Tierney (musician) =

Michael Tierney OAM
- Born: Michael John Tierney; 18 January 1977 (age 49); Sydney, New South Wales, Australia
- Genres: Pop, adult contemporary
- Instrument: Vocals
- Years active: 1996–present
- Label: Sony
- Member of: Human Nature

Michael John Tierney OAM (born 18 January 1977), is a member of Australian band Human Nature and younger brother of fellow member Andrew Tierney.

Mike Tierney grew up in Sydney, New South Wales, with older brother Andrew Tierney, and studied at Hurlstone Agricultural High School, where they met Toby Allen and Phil Burton, and formed a group called the 4Trax; they performed for the first time in 1989 at a Combined Schools Concert singing "Earth Angel".

Tierney is married to Andrea (née Pope) who is the younger sister of Heather Tierney (née Pope, Andrew's wife). They announced the birth of a daughter in 2010 in Nevada.

== Discography ==
=== Albums ===
Title	Details
Soundtrack of My Life (as Tierney Brothers)	Scheduled: 14 March 2025; Label: Tierney Brothers, Sony; Formats: Digital download, CD

=== Singles ===
Title	Year	Album
"Lemonade" (as The Tierney Brothers)	2024	Soundtrack of My Life
"Praying" (as The Tierney Brothers)	2024	Soundtrack of My Life
"Shining Star" (as The Tierney Brothers)	2024	Soundtrack of My Life
"Story Isn't Over" (as The Tierney Brothers)	2025	Soundtrack of My Life
