= Andrew Tierney =

- Born: Andrew James Tierney; 20 June 1974 (age 52); Sydney, New South Wales, Australia
- Genres: Pop, adult contemporary
- Instruments: Vocals, piano, keyboard
- Years active: 1996–present
- Label: Sony
- Member of: Human Nature
- Website: Official Site

Andrew James Tierney OAM (born 20 June 1974) is an Australian singer-songwriter and musician, who is a member of the music group Human Nature.

He is the brother of fellow band member Michael Tierney, and he and his wife live in Las Vegas.

In 2018, Tierney released an album titled Finding Faith as Finding Faith, a collaboration with a worship pastor, Timothy Dunfield.

== Discography ==
=== Albums ===
Title	Details
Finding Faith (as Finding Faith)	Released: 1 June 2018; Label: Andrew Tierney and Timothy Dunfield; Formats: Digital download
Soundtrack of My Life (as Tierney Brothers)	Scheduled: 14 March 2025; Label: Tierney Brothers, Sony; Formats: Digital download, CD

=== Singles ===
Title	Year	Album
"Lemonade" (as The Tierney Brothers)	2024	Soundtrack of My Life
"Praying" (as The Tierney Brothers)	2024	Soundtrack of My Life
"Shining Star" (as The Tierney Brothers)	2024	Soundtrack of My Life
"Story Isn't Over" (as The Tierney Brothers)	2025	Soundtrack of My Life
