= The Presidents of the United States of America discography =

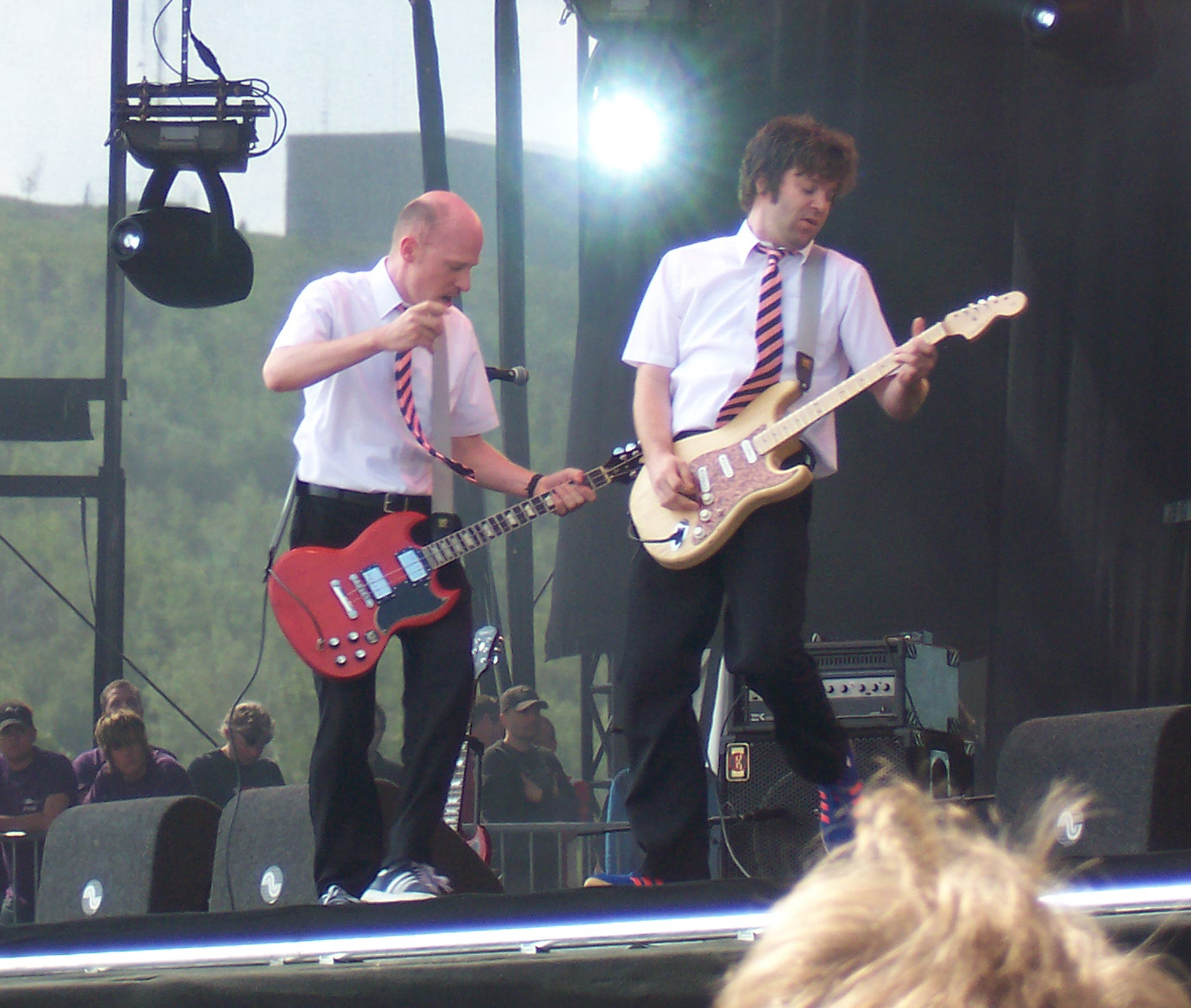
- The Presidents of the United States of America in concert in 2005.
- Studio albums: 6
- Extended plays: 2
- Live albums: 1
- Compilation albums: 2
- Singles: 16
- Video albums: 1
- Music videos: 3
- Demo album: 1

The discography of The Presidents of the United States of America, an American alternative rock group formed in Seattle, Washington in 1993, consists of six studio albums, sixteen singles, three extended plays, one video album, two compilation albums and a live album. The group's self-titled debut album was released on PopLlama Records in 1995 and re-released on Columbia Records in 1995, with the singles "Kitty" and "Lump" bringing them exposure on the United States charts, as well as in Canada, Europe, the United Kingdom and Australia. Since then, The Presidents of the United States of America released five further albums, sometimes on different labels, none of which have been received as commercially or critically well as their debut album. The band broke up in 2016.

== Albums ==
=== Studio albums ===
Title	Details	Peak chart positions											Certifications (sales threshold)
Title	Details	US	AUS	CAN	FIN	FRA	NL	NOR	NZ	SWE	SWI	UK	Certifications (sales threshold)
The Presidents of the United States of America	Release date: March 10, 1995; Re-release: July 25, 1995; Label: PopLlama Records, Columbia Records (re-release); Formats: CD, cassette, LP	6	3	5	25	40	18	—	3	18	—	14	RIAA: 3× Platinum; ARIA: 4× Platinum; BPI: Gold; MC: 4× Platinum; RMNZ: Platinum
II	Release date: November 5, 1996; Label: Columbia Records; Formats: CD, cassette, vinyl	31	3	71	30	43	64	35	20	29	50	36	RIAA: Gold; ARIA: Platinum; MC: Gold
Freaked Out and Small	Release date: September 12, 2000; Label: Music Blitz; Formats: CD, cassette	—	—	—	—	—	—	—	—	—	—	—	
Love Everybody	Release date: August 17, 2004; Label: PUSA Music; Formats: CD, download	—	—	—	—	—	—	—	—	—	—	—	
These Are the Good Times People	Release date: March 11, 2008; Label: TNL Records; Formats: CD, download	—	—	—	—	—	—	—	—	—	—	—	
Kudos to You!	Release date: February 14, 2014; Label: PUSA Music; Formats: CD, download, vinyl	—	—	—	—	—	—	—	—	—	—	—	
"—" denotes releases that did not chart or was not released in that territory.

=== Compilation albums ===
Title	Details	Peak positions
Title	Details	UK
Rarities	Release date: November 1, 1997; Label: Columbia Records; Formats: CD, cassette	—
Pure Frosting	Release date: March 10, 1998; Label: Columbia Records; Formats: CD, cassette	198
Lump	Release date: January 2000; Label: Sony Music Entertainment; Formats: CD, cassette	—
"—" denotes releases that did not chart or was not released in that territory.

=== Live albums ===
Title	Details
Thanks for the Feedback	Release date: 2014; Label: Sony Music Entertainment; Formats: CD, music download

== Extended plays ==
Title	Details
Froggystyle	Release date: 1994; Label: PUSA Music; Formats: Cassette
Peaches & Live	Release date: 1996; Label: Sony Music Entertainment; Formats: CD, cassette
Munky River	Release date: 2005; Label: PUSA Inc.; Formats: CD, music download
More Bad Times	Release date: 2009; Label: Tooth & Nail Records; Formats: CD, music download

== Singles ==
Year	Single	Peak chart positions										Certifications	Album
Year	Single	US	US Alt.	US Main.	AUS	CAN	FRA	ICE	IRE	NZ	UK	Certifications	Album
1994	"Fuck California"	—	—	—	—	—	—	—	—	—	—		Non-album singles
1994	"Naked and Famous"	—	—	—	—	—	—	—	—	—	—		Non-album singles
1995	"Kitty"	67 (Note: "Kitty" did not enter the Billboard Hot 100, but peaked at number 67 on the US Radio Songs chart.)	13	—	19	—	—	—	—	30	—		The Presidents of the United States of America
1995	"Lump"	21 (Note: "Lump" did not enter the Billboard Hot 100, but peaked at number 21 on the US Radio Songs chart.)	1	7	11	21	10	—	27	8	15	ARIA: Gold; BPI: Silver; RMNZ: Platinum	The Presidents of the United States of America
1996	"Peaches"	29	8	24	13	15	34	1	17	9	8	ARIA: Gold; RMNZ: Platinum	The Presidents of the United States of America
1996	"Ça Plane Pour Moi"	—	—	—	—	—	24	—	—	—	—		Rarities
1996	"Dune Buggy"	—	—	—	16	—	—	2	29	—	15		The Presidents of the United States of America
1996	"Mach 5"	68 (Note: "Mach 5" did not enter the Billboard Hot 100, but peaked at number 68 on the US Radio Songs chart.)	11	24	29	29	—	7	—	48	29		II
1996	"Supersonics"	—	—	—	—	—	—	—	—	—	—		II
1997	"Volcano"	—	38	—	55	—	—	—	—	—	—		II
1997	"Tiki God"	—	—	—	—	—	—	—	—	—	—		II
1998	"Video Killed the Radio Star"	—	—	—	—	—	—	—	—	—	52		Pure Frosting
2000	"Tiny Explosions"	—	—	—	—	—	—	—	—	—	—		Freaked Out & Small
2001	"Last Girl on Earth"	—	—	—	—	—	—	—	—	—	—		Freaked Out & Small
2004	"Some Postman"	—	—	—	—	—	—	—	—	—	—		Love Everybody
2005	"Love Everybody"	—	—	—	—	—	—	—	—	—	—		Love Everybody
"—" denotes releases that did not chart or was not released in that territory.

== Music videos ==
Year	Video	Director
1995	"Lump"	Roman Coppola
1995	"Kitty"	Roman Coppola
1996	"Peaches"	Roman Coppola
1996	"Dune Buggy"	Roman Coppola
1996	"Mach 5"	Roman Coppola
1997	"Volcano"	Mark Kohr
1997	"George of the Jungle"	—N/a
1998	"Video Killed the Radio Star"	Doug Craig
2000	"Tiny Explosions"	—N/a
2004	"Some Postman"	Grant Marshall
2005	"Zero Friction"	—N/a
2008	"Mixed Up S.O.B."	"Weird Al" Yankovic
2011	"Can't Stop (Catchin' 'Em All)"	Chase Jarvis
2014	"Poor Little Me"	Martin Ballew
