= Roman Coppola =

American filmmaker (born 1965)

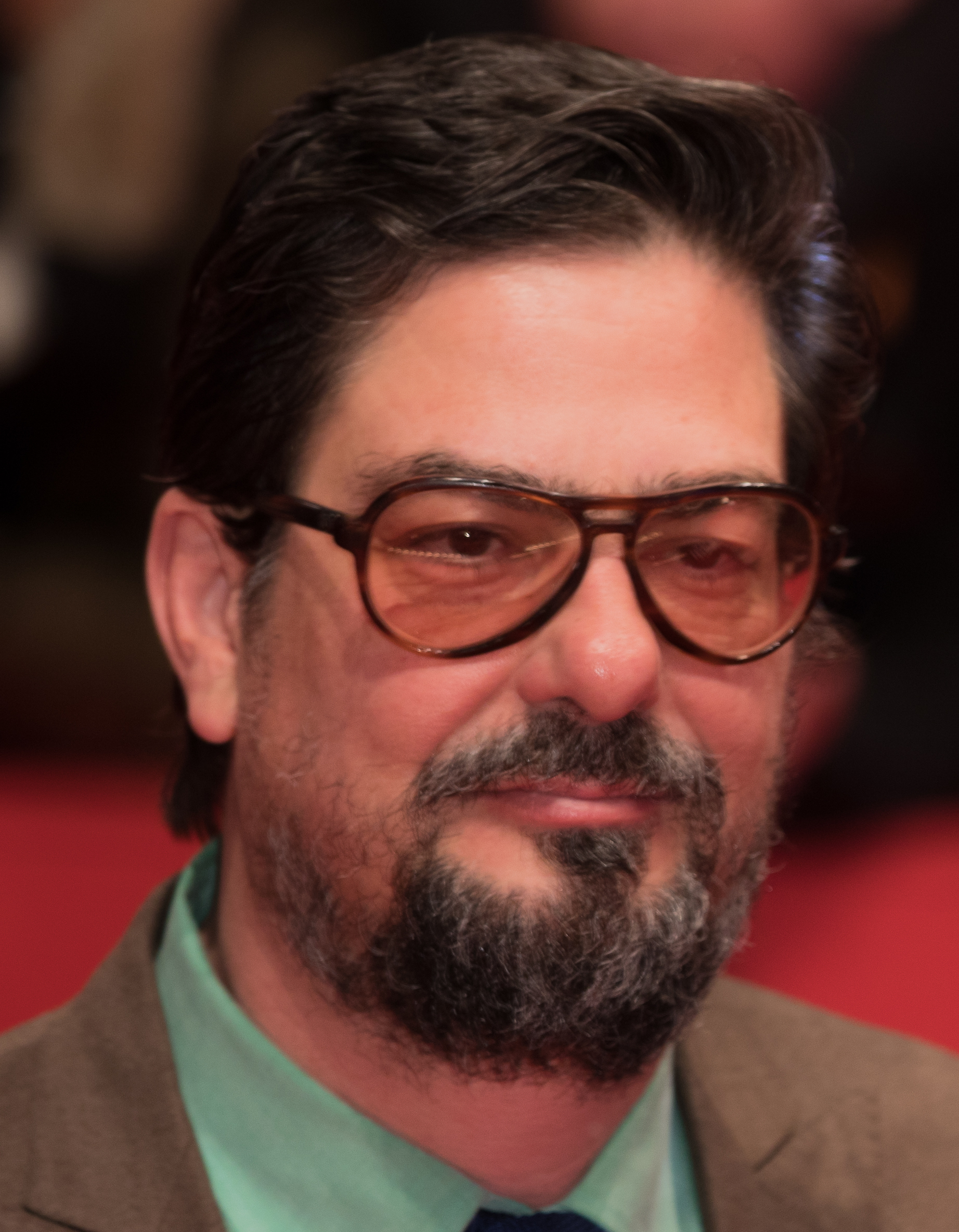
- Coppola in 2018
- Born: Roman François Coppola; April 22, 1965 (age 61); Neuilly-sur-Seine, France
- Occupation: Director
- Years active: 1983–present
- Title: President of American Zoetrope
- Spouse: Jennifer Furches
- Children: 3
- Parents: Francis Ford Coppola (father); Eleanor Neil (mother)
- Relatives: Coppola family

Roman François Coppola (born April 22, 1965) is an American director. He is the son of Eleanor and Francis Ford Coppola, and is known for his film collaborations with Wes Anderson.

Coppola serves as president of film company American Zoetrope. He is also the founder and owner of The Directors Bureau, a commercial and music video production company.

== Early life ==
Roman Coppola is the son of documentary filmmaker, artist, and writer Eleanor Coppola (née Neil) and director Francis Ford Coppola.

He and Sofia Coppola formed a production company Commercial Pictures in 1988, with funding from American Zoetrope. He produced three films Clownhouse, The Spirit of '76 and Ballad of a Gunfighter under the name.

== Career ==
Coppola began his directing career by overseeing in-camera visual effects and second unit direction for Francis Ford Coppola's Bram Stoker’s Dracula, which garnered a BAFTA Award nomination for Visual Effects. He has continued to do second unit direction throughout his career, including his father's Jack, The Rainmaker, Youth Without Youth, Tetro, and Megalopolis; collaborator Wes Anderson's The Life Aquatic with Steve Zissou and The Darjeeling Limited; and his sister Sofia Coppola's The Virgin Suicides and Marie Antoinette.

In the 1990s, Coppola established himself as an influential music video and commercial director. Through his production company, The Directors Bureau, he directed all four music videos for The Strokes' 2001 debut album, Is This It, as well as "12:51" for Room on Fire. His other music videos include clips for Daft Punk, Lilys, Moby, The Presidents of the United States of America, Ween, Green Day, and Fatboy Slim. His music video for Phoenix's "Funky Squaredance" was invited into the permanent collection at the New York Museum of Modern Art. He has also been a supporter of cousin Jason Schwartzman's musical side project, Coconut Records.

He also directed a commercial for Levi's White Tab in 1997.

His first feature film, CQ, premiered at the 2001 Cannes Film Festival and was well-received critically. Set in Paris in 1969, CQ centers on a young film editor trying to juggle his personal and professional life while simultaneously juggling a science fiction adventure and his own personal art film. The film holds a 66% rating on Rotten Tomatoes, based on 76 reviews. The site's consensus reads: "CQ is a stylish and fun homage to campy 1960s flicks". Metacritic gave the film a 56/100 "mixed or average" approval rating based on 26 reviews.

Coppola's second feature, A Glimpse Inside the Mind of Charles Swan III, debuted in 2012 at the Rome Film Festival. Charlie Sheen starred as the title character, a graphic designer dealing with a break-up. The cast also included Bill Murray and Jason Schwartzman. Reviews for the film tended toward the negative. Nathan Rabin of The A.V. Club gave the movie an F, saying that "it isn't a movie so much as a feature-length perfume commercial for a Charlie Sheen signature cologne with gorgeous packaging and absolutely nothing inside." The Dallas Observer said that the film "might generously be described as cut-and-paste – or more accurately as 'throw stuff to the wall and see what sticks'" and it was "a clunker". The New York Daily News gave Charles Swan III one star out of five, saying that "you want to swat it away" and that "maybe with this out of his [Coppola's] system, he'll think up something better." Time said that the film "does not lead to a deeper understanding of Charlie Sheen. It does, however, demonstrate his compulsion for poor judgment and bad choices. But weren't we already convinced of that?" Lisa Schwarzbaum, reviewer for Entertainment Weekly, gave the film a C and a milder response, writing, "The idea of this home-movie-with-higher-production-values directed by Roman Coppola is no less sweet for being unoriginal ... The execution, on the other hand, is perilously self-absorbed, a private party involving friends, family, too many fantasy sequences, and an abundance of costume and set design to create a notion of a stylized L.A. spritzed with eau de Playboy."

In 2009, he directed series of commercials for the T-Mobile MyTouch 3G mobile phone line.

In 2015, he directed a State Farm commercial.

In 2018, he co-wrote the story for Wes Anderson's adult stop-motion animated science-fiction drama film Isle of Dogs, which was released to critical acclaim for its animation, story, musical score, and deadpan humor. Richard Roeper of the Chicago Sun-Times gave the film three and a half stars out of four, praising it for taking risks, and saying: "It's smart and different and sometimes deliberately odd and really funny—rarely in a laugh-out-loud way, more in a smile-and-nod-I-get-the-joke kind of way."

In 2021, he again collaborated with Wes Anderson for the film The French Dispatch, he co-wrote the story and served as an executive producer. It received generally positive reviews. David Rooney of The Hollywood Reporter praised the "hand-crafted visual delights and eccentric performances" and wrote: "While The French Dispatch might seem like an anthology of vignettes without a strong overarching theme, every moment is graced by Anderson's love for the written word and the oddball characters who dedicate their professional lives to it". Writing for The Guardian, Peter Bradshaw said: "It might not be at the very zenith of what he can achieve but for sheer moment-by-moment pleasure, and for laughs, this is a treat". It was mentioned in lists of the best films of the year by The New Yorker (#1), The Forward (the best movie), IndieWire (#6), Esquire (#38), New Musical Express (#11), British Film Institute (#23) and Vogue (unlisted).

== Directors Bureau special projects ==
Coppola is also an inventor and entrepreneur, responsible for the Photobubble Company, Pacific Tote Company, and a number of projects through the "Special Projects" arm of his production company, Directors Bureau.

His company, Pacific Tote Company, produces a line of beach bags which are handmade in California and known for their signature multicolor designs.

== Filmography ==
=== Feature films ===
Year	Title	Director	Writer	Producer	Notes
1983	Rumble Fish	No	No	Associate	
1989	Clownhouse	No	No	Executive	
1990	The Spirit of '76	No	Story	Executive	
2002	CQ	Yes	Yes	No	
2007	The Darjeeling Limited	No	Yes	Yes	Co-writer with Wes Anderson and Jason Schwartzman
2010	Somewhere	No	No	Yes	
2012	Moonrise Kingdom	No	Yes	No	Co-writer with Wes Anderson
2012	On the Road	No	No	Yes	
2012	A Glimpse Inside the Mind of Charles Swan III	Yes	Yes	Yes	
2013	The Bling Ring	No	No	Yes	
2017	The Beguiled	No	No	Yes	
2018	Isle of Dogs	No	Story	No	Story with Wes Anderson, Jason Schwartzman and Kunichi Nomura
2020	On the Rocks	No	No	Executive	
2021	The French Dispatch	No	Story	Executive	Story with Wes Anderson, Hugo Guinness and Jason Schwartzman
2022	The Seven Faces of Jane	No	No	Yes	
2023	Fairyland	No	No	Executive	
2023	Asteroid City	No	Story	Executive	Story with Wes Anderson
2025	The Phoenician Scheme	No	Story	Executive	Story with Wes Anderson

=== Additional credits ===
Year	Title	Second Unit Director	Other	Director
1992	Bram Stoker's Dracula	Yes	Visual effects director	Francis Ford Coppola
1996	Jack	Yes	No	Francis Ford Coppola
1997	The Rainmaker	Yes	No	Francis Ford Coppola
1999	The Virgin Suicides	Yes	No	Sofia Coppola
2003	Lost in Translation	No	Additional director	Sofia Coppola
2004	The Life Aquatic with Steve Zissou	Yes	No	Wes Anderson
2006	Marie Antoinette	Yes	No	Sofia Coppola
2007	The Darjeeling Limited	Yes	No	Wes Anderson
2007	Youth Without Youth	Yes	No	Francis Ford Coppola
2009	Tetro	Yes	No	Francis Ford Coppola
2014	The Grand Budapest Hotel	No	Special photography unit	Wes Anderson
2023	Priscilla	Yes	No	Sofia Coppola
2024	Megalopolis	Yes	No	Francis Ford Coppola
2025	Marc by Sofia	No	Cinematographer	Sofia Coppola

=== Acting credits ===
Year	Title	Role	Notes
1966	You're a Big Boy Now	Baby boy in carriage	Uncredited
1972	The Godfather	Boy on street who attended funeral	Uncredited
1974	The Godfather Part II	Sonny Corleone as a boy	Uncredited
1979	Apocalypse Now	Francis de Marais	Redux version only
1999	Gunfighter	Bandido	
1999	Star Wars: Episode I – The Phantom Menace	Senate Guard	Uncredited
2009	Fantastic Mr. Fox	Squirrel Contractor	Voice
2018	Isle of Dogs	Igor	Voice

=== Television ===
Year	Title	Director	Executive producer	Writer	Notes
2002	$2 Bill	Yes	No	No	Episode: "The Strokes"
2013	Arcade Fire in Here Comes the Night Time	Yes	No	No	Television special
2014–2018	Mozart in the Jungle	Yes	Yes	Yes	
2015	A Very Murray Christmas	Associate	Yes	No	Television special
2020	Mariah Carey's Magical Christmas Special	Yes	Yes	No	Co-directed with Hamish Hamilton, Television special

=== Short films ===
Year	Title	Director	Writer	Producer	Other credit(s)	Notes
1996	Bed, Bath and Beyond	No	No	No	Actor, cinematographer	
1999	Torrance Rises	No	No	No	Cinematographer	
2011	Fight for Your Right Revisited	No	No	No	Actor	Role: Café Patron
2012	¡El Tonto	No	No	Yes		
2012	Modern/Love	No	No	Yes		
2012	The Mirror Between Us	No	No	Yes		
2012	Eugene	No	No	Executive		
2012	Die Again, Undead One	Yes	Yes	Yes		
2013	Castello Cavalcanti	No	No	Yes		
2016	Mommeostasis	Yes	No	No		Commercial for Progressive Corporation
2023	The Swan	No	No	No	Cinematographer	

=== Music videos ===
Year	Artist	Song
1994	Nancy Boy	"Deep Sleep Motel"
1994	Ween	"Voodoo Lady"
1994	P.M. Dawn	"Norwegian Wood (This Bird Has Flown)"
1995	Butterglory	"She's Got the Akshun"
1995	Love Battery	"Harold's Pink Room"
1995	The Presidents of the United States of America	"Lump" (Version #1) / "Kitty"
1995	Matthew Sweet	"Sick of Myself" / "We're the Same"
1995	Mike Watt & Evan Dando	"Piss-Bottle Man"
1996	Green Day	"Walking Contradiction"
1996	Mansun	"Taxloss"
1996	The Presidents of the United States of America	"Lump" (Version #2) / "Peaches" / "Dune Buggy" / "Mach 5"
1996	The Rentals	"Waiting"
1997	Wyclef Jean and The Refugee All-Stars featuring John Forté and Pras	"We Trying to Stay Alive"
1998	God Lives Underwater	"From Your Mouth"
1998	Cassius	"Foxxy"
1998	Daft Punk	"Revolution 909"
1998	Fatboy Slim	"Gangster Tripping"
1998	Moby	"Honey"
1999	Cassius	"La Mouche"
1999	Supergrass	"We Still Need More (Than Anyone Can Give)"
2000	Air	"Playground Love"
2000	Phoenix	"Funky Squaredance"
2000	Mellow	"Another Mellow Winter"
2001	The Strokes	"Last Nite" (Version #2)
2002	Marianne Faithfull	"Sex with Strangers"
2002	Phantom Planet	"California"
2002	The Strokes	"The Modern Age" / "Hard to Explain" (Version #2) / "Someday"
2002	The Vines	"Get Free"
2003	Ima Robot	"Dynomite"
2003	The Strokes	"12:51"
2004	Phoenix	"Everything Is Everything"
2006	Phoenix	"Long Distance Call"
2006	Rooney	"Tell Me Soon"
2007	Arctic Monkeys	"Teddy Picker"
2009	Sébastien Tellier	"L'Amour et La Violence"
2013	Arcade Fire	"Here Comes the Night Time"
2014	Kylie Minogue	"Sexercize"
2015	Beastie Boys featuring Nas	"Too Many Rappers"
2017	Carly Rae Jepsen and Lil Yachty	"It Takes Two"
2020	The Strokes	"The Adults Are Talking"
2020	Mariah Carey	"Oh Santa!"
2020	Paul McCartney	"Find My Way"

=== Commercials and promotional videos ===
Year	Title	Director	Writer	Notes
1997	Levi's White Tab: Daytrippers	Yes	No	
2004	Burger King: Ugoff	Yes	No	
2009	T-Mobile: Icons, Comedians, Musicians	Yes	No	Series of commercials for the T-Mobile MyTouch 3G mobile phone line
2010	Stella Artois: Apartomatic	Yes	No	Co-directed with Wes Anderson
2012	Cousin Ben Troop Screening with Jason Schwartzman	No	Yes	Promotional short for Moonrise Kingdom, co-written with Wes Anderson
2013	Prada: Candy	Yes	No	Co-directed with Wes Anderson
2015	Magic Jingle Elvis	Yes	No	State Farm commercial
2017	L'Oréal Paris	Yes	No	L'Oréal Paris commercial for new Elvive haircare line

== Awards and honors ==
In 2019, Coppola was invited to join the Academy of Motion Picture Arts and Sciences.

Association	Year	Category	Nominated work	Result	Ref(s)
Academy Awards	2013	Best Original Screenplay (Shared with Wes Anderson)	Moonrise Kingdom	Nominated	
BAFTA Awards	1994	Best Special Effects (Shared with Gary Gutierrez, Michael Lantieri, and Gene Warren Jr.)	Bram Stoker's Dracula	Nominated	
Grammy Awards	1997	Best Music Video, Short Form	"Walking Contradiction"	Nominated	
NYFCO Award	2007	Best Screenplay (Shared with Wes Anderson and Jason Schwartzman)	The Darjeeling Limited	Won	
Rome Film Festival	2012	Golden Marc'Aurelio Award	A Glimpse Inside the Mind of Charles Swan III	Nominated	
