= Pure Frosting =

1998 compilation album by the Presidents of the United States of America

Compilation album by The Presidents of the United States of America
- Released: March 10, 1998
- Recorded: 1996–1997
- Genre: Alternative rock, power pop
- Length: 38:29
- Label: Columbia

The Presidents of the United States of America chronology
Rarities (1997)	Pure Frosting (1998)	Lump (2000)

Professional ratings
Review scores
Source	Rating
AllMusic	3/5 stars
Entertainment Weekly	C+
Pitchfork Media	8/10
Rolling Stone	3/5 stars

Pure Frosting is a compilation album by the American alternative rock band The Presidents of the United States of America. It was released on March 10, 1998.

It was, at the time, the band's last album, as they had broken up in 1998. They later reunited and released new albums until breaking up again in 2015.

"Video Killed the Radio Star" originally appeared on The Wedding Singer soundtrack, and it is a cover of the song originally by Bruce Woolley and popularized by The Buggles. This is the third version of the song The Presidents has released, as they originally released a live version as a b-side, and released a different studio version on Rarities. "Man (Opposable Thumb)" originally appeared on the 1997 soundtrack of Good Burger. "Cleveland Rocks" is also a cover, originally by Ian Hunter, and was used as the theme song to The Drew Carey Show.

The album takes its title from an early name for the band.

== Track listing ==
All songs by Chris Ballew unless otherwise noted.

1. "Love Delicatessen" – 4:12
2. "Video Killed the Radio Star" (Geoffrey Downes, Trevor Horn, Bruce Woolley) – 3:22
3. "Mobile Home" – 2:52
4. "Japan" – 2:30
5. "Sunshine" – 2:09
6. "Back Porch (Live)" – 3:30
  - Recorded live 1996-08-01 Hordern Pavilion, Sydney, Australia
7. "Man (Opposable Thumb)" – 3:16
8. "Tiki Lounge God" – 3:10
9. "Teenage Girl" – 2:23
10. "Slip Away" (Dave Dederer) – 2:44
11. "Tremolo Blooz" – 2:50
12. "Cleveland Rocks" (Ian Hunter) – 2:33
13. "Lump (Live)" – 2:58
  - Recorded live 1996-11-05 at The Virgin Megastore, New York City
  - Followed by the hidden track "Hot Carl" – 0:16 which plays after about 5 minutes of silence

== Extra Frosting ==
The Australian tour edition of Pure Frosting included a bonus disc called Extra Frosting

All songs by Chris Ballew unless otherwise noted.

1. "Lump" – 2:14
2. "Tiki God" – 2:58
3. "Kick Out the Jams" (Michael Davis, Wayne Kramer, Fred "Sonic" Smith, Dennis Thompson, Robin Tyner) – 1:25
4. "Dune Buggy" – 2:44
5. "Peaches" – 2:51
6. "Mach 5" – 3:15
7. "Kitty" – 3:23
8. "Ça Plane Pour Moi" (Yvea Lacomblez, Lou De Pryck) – 1:54
9. "Volcano" – 2:58
10. "Naked and Famous" – 3:42

== Personnel ==
- Chris Ballew – vocals, bass
- Dave Dederer – guitars
- Jason Finn – drums
