= Lump =

Lump may refer to:

- "Lump" (song), a 1995 song by The Presidents of the United States of America
- Lump (compilation album), a 2000 best-of album by The Presidents of the United States of America
- Lump (dog), a dog who inspired Pablo Picasso
- The Lump, a 1991 animated short film
- Lump hammer, a sledgehammer
- Lump, a thermo-spatial unit in a lumped capacitance model of a thermal system
- Swelling (medical)
- Globus pharyngeus, a "lump in one's throat"
- Clay lump, a mudbrick
- Lump of coal, a threat to misbehaving children (instead of presents at Christmas); or a bringer of warmth for the New Year
- Lump, the Ober of Hearts in Schafkopf language
- Protusion on a tool surface, also known as gall
- LUMP, a musical collaboration of Laura Marling and Tunng member Mike Lindsay
- The practice of combining sets of individuals into one classification

== See also ==
- Lump sum, a one-time payment of money
