= Deleter (disambiguation) =

Deleter may refer to:

- Deleter, a 2022 Philippine techno-horror film
- Deleter, a 2020 album by Holy Fuck
- "Deleter", a 2018 song by Grouplove
- "Deleter", a 2008 song by the band The Presidents of the United States of America from These Are the Good Times People
