= Beatles Baby! =

Studio album by Caspar Babypants
- Released: September 18, 2015
- Recorded: Seattle
- Genre: Children
- Label: Aurora Elephant Music
- Producer: Caspar Babypants

Caspar Babypants chronology
Night Night!	Beatles Baby!	Away We Go!

Beatles Baby! is the tenth studio album by American children's musician Caspar Babypants, aka Chris Ballew, formerly the lead singer of the Presidents of the United States of America.

The album consists of 21 covers of original Beatles songs. In 2013, Ballew released Baby Beatles! After supposedly waking up singing "Strawberry Fields Forever" one day, he decided to record a second covers album.

Although recorded on a variety of instruments—many of which differ greatly from those on the original recordings—Ballew paid homage to the British band by copying several of their recording techniques, including between-track comments and a three-guitar solo on "The End". Additionally, all the tracks were mixed to match the volume and levels of every other Caspar Babypants song previously recorded.

The artwork for the album was created by Seattle-based artist Kate Endle, Ballew's wife.

== Track listing ==
All tracks are written by John Lennon and Paul McCartney, except where noted.

No.	Title	Writer(s)	Length
1.	"Sgt Pepper's Lonely Hearts Club Band"
2.	"With a Little Help from My Friends"
3.	"Hey Jude"
4.	"Strawberry Fields Forever"
5.	"For You Blue"	George Harrison
6.	"Rain"
7.	"One After 909"
8.	"Honey Pie"
9.	"The Fool on the Hill"
10.	"The Word"
11.	"Lady Madonna"
12.	"Piggies"	Harrison
13.	"Hello Goodbye"
14.	"Baby You're a Rich Man"
15.	"When I'm Sixty Four"
16.	"Dear Prudence"
17.	"Good Day Sunshine"
18.	"Drive My Car"
19.	"Sgt Pepper's Lonely Hearts Club Band (Reprise)"
20.	"Golden Slumbers"
21.	"The End"
