= Love Everybody =

Studio album by the Presidents of the United States of America
- Released: August 17, 2004
- Recorded: 2003
- Genre: Alternative rock
- Length: 38:16
- Label: PUSA Inc.
- Producer: Martin Feveyear

The Presidents of the United States of America chronology
Freaked Out and Small (2000)	Love Everybody (2004)	These Are the Good Times People (2008)

Singles from Love Everybody
- 1. "Some Postman" Released: June 28, 2004; 2. "Love Everybody" Released: March 14, 2005 (UK)

Professional ratings
Review scores
Source	Rating
AllMusic	4/5 stars
The Encyclopedia of Popular Music	3/5 stars
Pitchfork Media	6.5/10
Rolling Stone	3/5 stars

Love Everybody is the fourth studio album by American rock band the Presidents of the United States of America. It was released on August 17, 2004, on the band's own label, PUSA Inc. It was the group's final album with Dave Dederer. The band returned to their standard musical style on this album.

When the album was released in the UK, in 2005, it contained four bonus tracks. They included live versions of songs from their debut album, The Presidents of the United States of America, the previously unreleased song "Useless Crushes", and a cover of the Sex Pistols' "Problems".

== Critical reception ==
The Spokesman-Review wrote that the album "finds The Presidents comfortably spinning absurdist fun-rock that recalls its super-successful 1995 self-titled debut." The Stranger called the album "vintage Presidents: infectious exuberance, great hooks, and a renewed sense of pop purpose."

== Track listing ==
All songs by Chris Ballew unless otherwise noted.

No.	Title	Writer(s)	Length
1.	"Love Everybody"		2:37
2.	"Some Postman"		2:51
3.	"Clean Machine"		2:31
4.	"Highway Forever"		2:52
5.	"Zero Friction"		2:48
6.	"Surf's Down"		1:44
7.	"Shortwave"		2:12
8.	"Poke and Destroy"		2:39
9.	"Munky River"		3:02
10.	"Drool at You"		2:29
11.	"Vestina"	Ballew, Tad Hutchison	2:53
12.	"5,500 Miles"		3:57
13.	"Shreds of Boa"		3:02
14.	"Jennifer's Jacket"		2:39

=== UK bonus tracks ===
15. "Problems (NapsterLive Version)" (Steve Jones, Glen Matlock, Paul Cook, Johnny Rotten) – 1:53
16. "Lump (Live at End Session in Seattle)" – 2:54
17. "Naked and Famous (Live at End Session in Seattle)" – 3:51
18. "Useless Crushes" – 2:44

== Personnel ==
- Chris Ballew – basitar, clavinet, synthesizer, sound effects, mixing, editing, engineering, acoustic guitar, guitar, keyboards, harmonica, bass guitar, electric piano
- Dave Dederer – guitbass, guitar, acoustic guitar, bass guitar, drums on "Vestina"
- Jason Finn – drums, guitbass on "Vestina"
- Martin Feveyear – production, engineering, mixing
- Conrad Uno – engineering, mixing
- Jon Ervie – engineering
- Vlado Meller – mastering
- Bootsy Holler – cover photo
- Kiki Ajidarma – design, packaging
