= The Days Are Filled with Years =

Studio album by The Giraffes
- Released: May 23, 2000
- Genre: Rock
- Length: 44:22
- Label: Orange Recordings
- Producer: Chris Ballew? and/or Mark Guenther?

The Giraffes chronology
13 Other Dimensions (1998)	The Days Are Filled with Years (2000)

Professional ratings
Review scores
Source	Rating
Pitchfork	4.8/10 link

The Days Are Filled with Years was released by The Giraffes in 2000 (see 2000 in music) on Orange Recordings. It is the second album as The Giraffes by The Presidents of the United States of America's Chris Ballew. Cover art features a picture of Ballew's infant son, Augie Ballew, at the piano.

== Track listing ==
1. "Giraffes in the Underworld" 3:40
2. "Kill the Cake" 3:07
3. "Black Shadow" 2:56
4. "Drunk on the Sweepings" 3:20
5. "Easy Phantom" 2:30
6. "Gone Again Gone" 3:21
7. "When She's Drunk" 2:37
8. "Bone Dry" 3:08
9. "Cypress Ghost" 3:16
10. "Mess of Doubt" 3:15
11. "Room Forever" 3:16
12. "Burned by a Summer" 2:38
13. "Headphone Sunset" 7:21

== Liner notes ==
Instruments on this stereo recording include...2 string guitar, 3 string acoustic guitar and electric guitars, 6 string acoustic guitar and electric guitars, 4 string bass, 1 string bass, acoustic piano, synthesizer, electric piano, organ bass, 3 string banjo, drums and drum loops

Mastered by Mark Guenther at Seattle Disk Mastering

Recorded at home on a cassette

Dedicated to memory of Mark Sandman

Photos by C.B.

All sounds made by Chris Ballew

Thanks Mary-Lynn and Augie
