= Bush School (Washington) =

The Bush School

Location
- 3400 East Harrison Street; Madison Valley; Seattle, Washington 98112; United States; 47°37′23″N 122°17′20″W

Information
- School type: Private
- Motto: Experience education
- Established: 1924
- Founder: Helen Taylor Bush
- Head of school: Sarah Smith
- Faculty: 85
- Employees: 45
- Grades: K–12
- Enrollment: 580: K–5: 185; 6–8: 160; 9–12: 235
- Campus size: 6 acres (24,000 m^{2})
- Colors: Blue and white
- Accreditation: Northwest Association of Accredited Schools
- Website: www.bush.edu
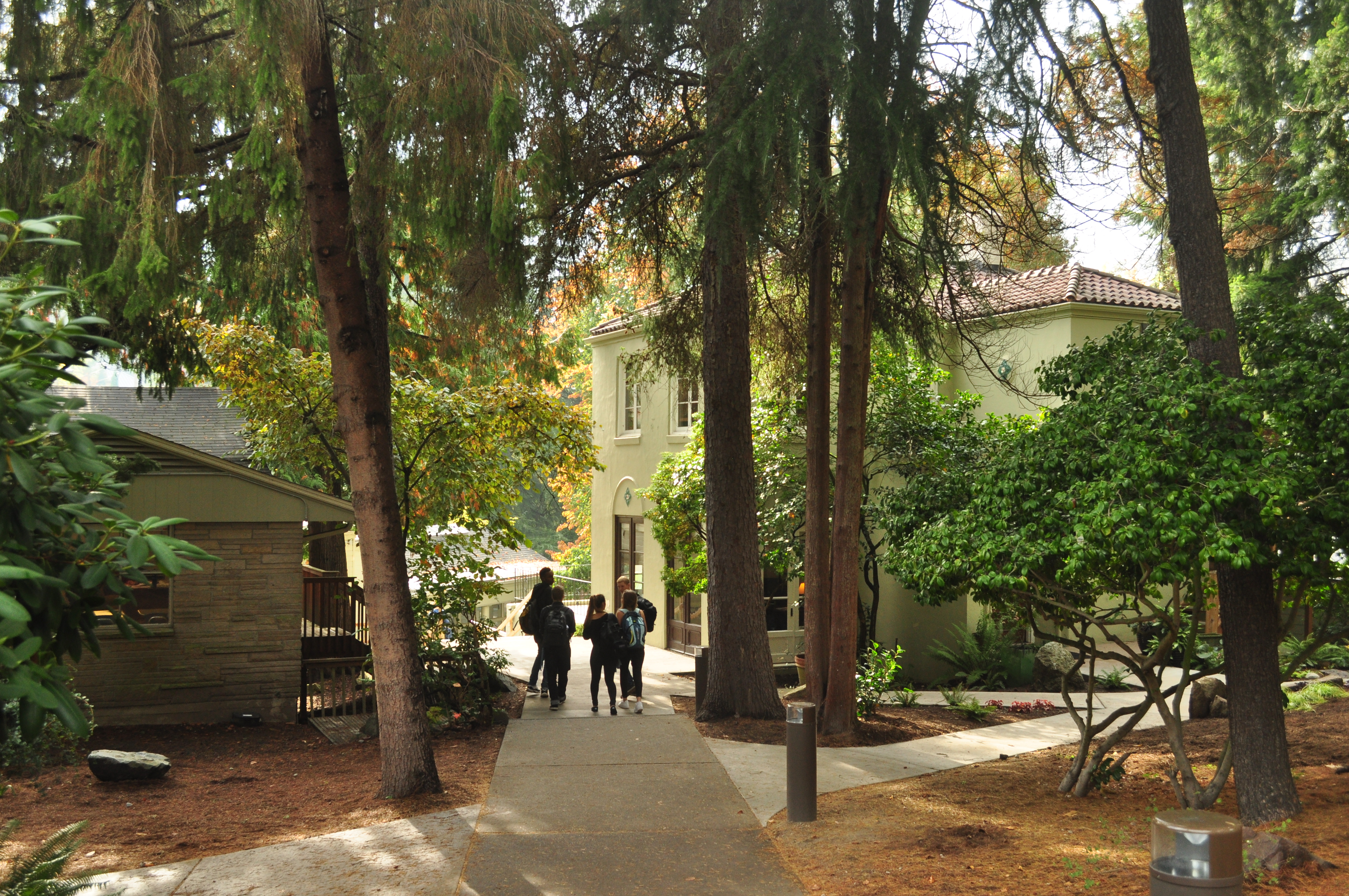

The Bush School is an independent private K–12 school in Seattle, Washington. Founded in 1924 by Helen Taylor Bush, The Bush School today enrolls 735 students. As of 2020, school review website Niche ranks the Bush School as the best private K-12 school in Washington state and the 4th best private prep and high school in the Washington state.

== History ==
In 1924, Helen Taylor Bush, a supporter of John Dewey's philosophy of progressive education, opened a preschool and kindergarten in her home to six students. In 1929, the school, having grown to six grades, the school was organized as a nonprofit corporation with a board of trustees. The Helen Bush School for Girls formally began in 1930.

In 1941, Bush helped organize the Pacific Northwest Association of Independent Schools, now called NWAIS.

Gracemont became part of the Bush School campus in 1944. The house itself, plus the carriage house and the grounds, were transferred to Mrs. Bush by Grace Heffernan Arnold. Gracemont continues to serve as a classroom and administrative building for the Upper School.

In 1968 the boarding program was phased out.

The school was formally renamed the Bush School in 1970 and began enrolling boys in the Upper School, making it Seattle's only K–12 coeducational independent school.

In 1986, the Bush School completed two capital campaigns that dated back to 1972 resulting in a faculty endowment, renovations to its Gracemont building, and construction of the Commons, a new gym, an art building, administrative offices, Benaroya, and the urban courtyard.

Construction of the Lower Campus including the Lower School classrooms, Community Room, library, Mag Gym, turf field, play structure, and the parking structure was completed in 2006.

In 2016, The Bush School acquired a second campus, called the Bush Methow Campus, in Mazama, Washington. The twenty-acre campus and educational facility, formerly known as the North Cascades Basecamp, integrates wilderness, cultural, and academic experiential learning.

== Notable alumni ==
- Chris Ballew (1983), member of the band the Presidents of the United States of America, children's musician (stage name Caspar Babypants)
- Claire Dederer (1985), author
- Dave Dederer (1982), member of the band the Presidents of the United States of America
- Meg Greenfield, political editorial writer
- Risa Lavizzo-Mourey, president and CEO of the Robert Wood Johnson Foundation
- Bonnie McKee (2002), songwriter
- Gray Newell (2016), professional race car driver
- Sweet Water, American rock band
- Rence (2016), singer-songwriter
