= Risa Lavizzo-Mourey =

American healthcare administrator

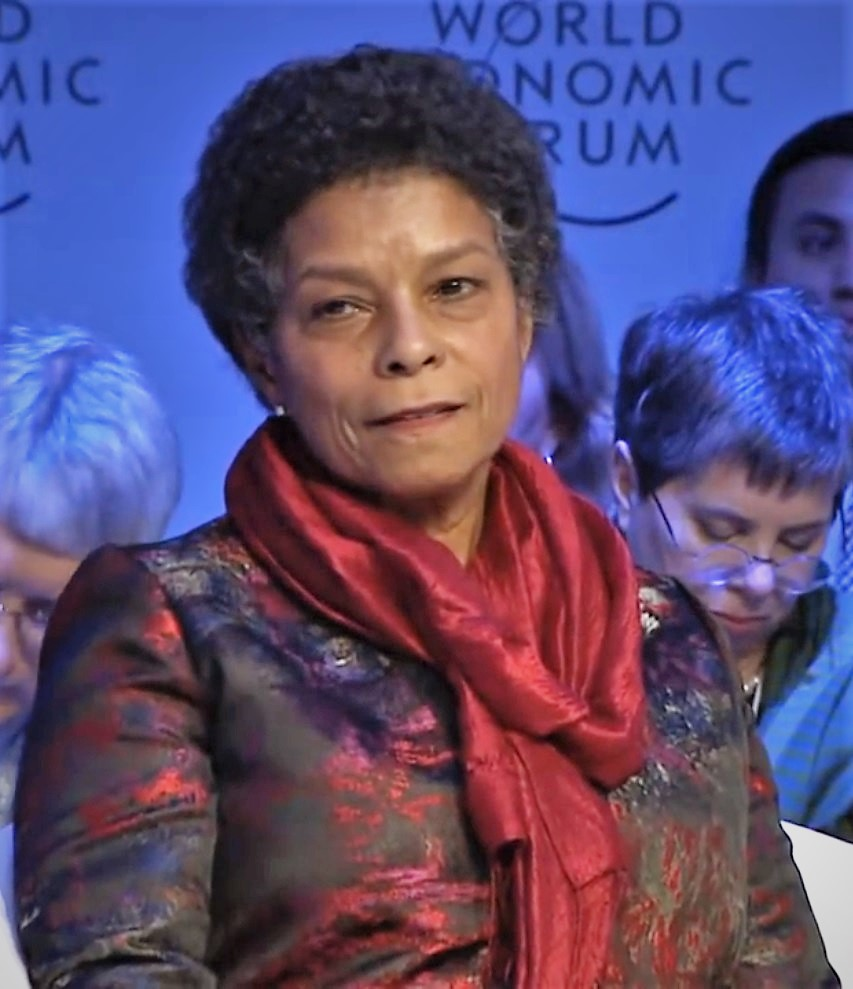
- Lavizzo-Mourey at the 2017 World Economic Forum

Personal details
- Born: September 25, 1954 (age 71) Seattle, Washington, U.S.
- Education: State University of New York, Stony Brook (BS); Harvard University (MD); University of Pennsylvania (MBA)

Risa J. Lavizzo-Mourey (born September 25, 1954) is an American medical doctor and executive who served as president and CEO of the Robert Wood Johnson Foundation from 2003 to 2017. She was the first woman and the first African-American to head the foundation, which has an endowment of about $8 billion and distributes more than $400 million a year. She has been named one of the 100 Most Powerful Women by Forbes several times, and one of The Grio's History Makers in the Making. She was elected a Member of the American Philosophical Society in 2016.

== Education and early career ==
Born in Seattle, Washington, in 1954, Risa Lavizzo-Mourey attended The Bush School and obtained an undergraduate degree at the State University of New York at Stony Brook, her M.D. at Harvard Medical School and completed her internship and residency at Brigham and Women's Hospital in Boston. In 1984, she was named a Robert Wood Johnson Foundation Clinical Scholar at the University of Pennsylvania, and received her Master of Business Administration degree in health care administration from the University of Pennsylvania's Wharton School in 1986. She is master and former regent of the American College of Physicians, where she chaired its committees on ethics and human rights.

== Career ==
Lavizzo-Mourey joined the Robert Wood Johnson Foundation in April 2001 as a senior vice president and director of its Health Care Group. Prior to joining the foundation, she served as director of the Institute on Aging, at the University of Pennsylvania; as well as chief of the division of geriatric medicine; Sylvan Eisman Professor of Medicine and Health Care Systems; and associate chief of staff for geriatrics and extended care for the Philadelphia Veterans Administration Medical Center. She also served in the United States Department of Health and Human Services as deputy administrator of the Agency for Healthcare Policy and Research (now known as the Agency for Healthcare Research and Quality). Lavizzo-Mourey was a member of the White House Task Force on Health Care Reform and served as a consultant to the White House on issues of health policy.

Lavizzo-Mourey has served on several federal advisory committees, including the Task Force on Aging Research, the Office of Technology Assessment Panel on Preventive Services for Medicare Beneficiaries, the Institute of Medicine's Panel on Disease and Disability Prevention Among Older Adults, and the National Committee for Vital and Health Statistics (where she chaired the Subcommittee on Minority Populations). She joined an impressive list of council members following an executive order by President Barack Obama for the installment of the President's Council on Fitness, Sports and Nutrition to take on the childhood obesity epidemic. In 2014, Lavizzo-Mourey was appointed a member of the Smithsonian's board of regents. She also served on the President's Advisory Commission on Consumer Protection and Quality in the Health Care Industry. She recently completed service as co-vice chair of a congressionally requested Institute of Medicine study on racial disparities in health care.

In January 2018, Lavizzo-Mourey joined the University of Pennsylvania as the institution's nineteenth Penn Integrates Knowledge University Professor. She is a member of the University of Pennsylvania's Center for Health Incentives & Behavioral Economics (CHIBE) External Advisory Board.

== Awards and recognitions ==
As of 2016, Lavizzo-Mourey is listed as the 97th most powerful woman in the world by Forbes.

- 2019: Sedgwick Memorial Medal from the American Public Health Association.

== Personal life ==
She is married to Robert Lavizzo-Mourey and has two adult children. Lavizzo-Mourey currently resides in Glenside, Pennsylvania.
