= Freaked Out and Small =

Studio album by The Presidents of the United States of America
- Released: September 12, 2000
- Recorded: 2000
- Genres: Alternative rock, grunge, pop-punk
- Length: 36:10
- Label: MUSICBLITZ
- Producer: Martin Feveyear

The Presidents of the United States of America chronology
Lump (2000)	Freaked Out and Small (2000)	Love Everybody (2004)

Singles from Freaked Out and Small
- 1. "Tiny Explosions" Released: 2000 (EU); 2. "Last Girl on Earth" Released: 2001 (EU)

Professional ratings
Aggregate scores
Source	Rating
Metacritic	(77/100)
Review scores
Source	Rating
AllMusic	4/5 stars
Alternative Press	4/5 stars
Billboard	(favorable)
The Rolling Stone Album Guide	3/5 stars
Wall of Sound	(74/100)

Freaked Out and Small is the third studio album by the American alternative rock band The Presidents of the United States of America. It was released in 2000 by MUSICBLITZ Records, which was a web based label. Copies of the album distributed through MUSICBLITZ included in the liner notes a special thanks to anyone who pre-ordered it from the MUSICBLITZ website. These fans are listed individually, by name.

An interesting note about this album is that all of the songs were played with normal guitars and bass guitars in standard tuning. This is different from all of the other albums by the band, as they usually played with guitbasses and basitars, which are modified guitars with fewer strings that are tuned to Drop D flat tuning (i.e. tuned to Drop D, then tuned a semitone lower).

This album was re-released in 2004 on the band's own label, PUSA Inc. with bonus tracks that included demos of 8 of the 12 songs on the album, as well as 2 other songs, as Chris Ballew originally recorded them between 1989 and 1996.

== Tab Book/DVD ==
In 2001, a tab book was released for the album that included a DVD of the entire album performed live.

== Track listing ==
All songs by Chris Ballew unless otherwise noted.

No.	Title	Writer(s)	Length
1.	"Tiny Explosions"		2:50
2.	"Nuthin But Luv"		2:41
3.	"Tiger Bomb"		3:18
4.	"Last Girl on Earth"		2:20
5.	"Jazz Guy"	Dave Dederer	2:13
6.	"Meanwhile Back in the City"		3:22
7.	"Jupiter"		2:38
8.	"Superstar"	Dederer	3:08
9.	"Death Star"		3:22
10.	"Blank Baby"		3:48
11.	"I'm Mad"	Dederer	2:15
12.	"Headin' Out"	Ballew, Dederer	4:15

=== Re-release bonus tracks ===
13. "Velvet Universe" – 2:40
14. "Hand in Hand" – 2:11
15. "Tiny Explosions (demo)" – 3:13
16. "Nuthin But Love (demo)" – 2:27
17. "Tiger Bomb (demo)" – 3:24
18. "Last Girl On Earth (demo)" – 3:03
19. "Meanwhile Back in the City (demo)" – 3:13
20. "Jupiter (demo)" – 3:24
21. "Death Star (demo)" – 3:03
22. "Blank Baby (demo)" – 3:22

Most of these tracks were recorded in 1996 except for tracks 19 and 22, recorded in 1989.

== Personnel ==
- Chris Ballew – vocals, bass
- Dave Dederer – guitar, vocals
- Jason Finn – drums, percussion
- Duff McKagan – bass on "I'm Mad"
