= 13 Other Dimensions =

Studio album by the Giraffes
- Released: March 10, 1998
- Genre: Rock, pop
- Length: 39:47
- Label: My Own Planet
- Producer: Chris Ballew

The Giraffes chronology
13 Other Dimensions (1998)	The Days Are Filled with Years (2000)

Professional ratings
Review scores
Source	Rating
Rolling Stone	2/5 stars

13 Other Dimensions is an album by the American band the Giraffes. It was released through the Seattle label My Own Planet, on CD and vinyl in 1998. It is essentially a solo effort by Chris Ballew (ex-Presidents of the United States of America), recorded in Ballew's basement. The album was published as being a work by a fictional band composed of Ballew's childhood stuffed animals. Ballew's name appears nowhere on the album.

The Giraffes record was the first of a planned series of six made under a volume agreement with Ballew's main label, Columbia; however only two albums were made, the second was released by Orange Recordings. Roni Sarg, in Tucson Weekly's Rhythm and Views section, postulates that the putative stars of the Giraffes were chosen for their "photogenic cuteness".

== Track listing ==
All tracks written by Chris Ballew

1. "Chocolate Dimension" 3:18
2. "Lonely Chicken" 3:15
3. "Hopeless (Rub It In)" 3:50
4. "Every Crocodile" 3:45
5. "Comin' Around" 1:41
6. "Nothin' 2 Looz" 2:36
7. "Brain on Yer Tongue" 3:02
8. "Little Champion" 3:16
9. "Pale Moon" 3:02
10. "Ghost of a Bad Friend" 4:06
11. "Slow Slow Fly" 2:44
12. "Poodle Mouth" 2:56
13. "Wither Without You" 2:17

== Personnel ==
All instruments played by Chris Ballew.

=== Fictional ===
- Giraffe - lead vocals, rhythm guitar
- Munkey Sr. - lead guitar
- Yoko Glick - piano, organ, clavinette
- Barry Lowe - Basitar
- Munkey Jr. - horns and strings
- Chickey - drums
