= Kudos to You! =

2014 studio album by the Presidents of the United States of America

Studio album by The Presidents of the United States of America
- Released: February 14, 2014
- Recorded: 2007, October–November 2013
- Genre: Alternative rock
- Length: 34:59 (CD); 38:42 (vinyl)
- Label: PUSA Inc. Burnside Records
- Producer: Martin Feveyear & The Presidents of the United States of America

The Presidents of the United States of America chronology
These Are the Good Times People (2008)	Kudos to You! (2014)	Thanks for the Feedback (2014)

Kudos to You! is the sixth and final studio album by The Presidents of the United States of America. It was released on February 14, 2014.

The album was announced on November 22, 2013. It started as a project through the direct-to-fan platform PledgeMusic, where fans were able to pledge money for the future album, as well as other rarities, such as lyric sheets. The project reached its goal in nine days.

According to their PledgeMusic campaign, The Presidents of the United States of America more or less actively considered These Are the Good Times People to be their final album. Despite this, studio time was booked for October 2013, with nothing really planned. No songs had been written, but apparently the music kept coming, and more studio time was booked for November.

Also announced as part of this project was a live album, which was released the same day. The live album, Thanks for the Feedback, features 20 songs from one of the band's performances at PUSAFEST '11.

Pledgers were able to pledge money for a limited-edition colored vinyl release of the album, the color of the vinyl voted on by the pledgers. The winning color combination ended up being a burgundy and yellow swirl. This vinyl was exclusive to pledgers, limited to 200 copies, and will reportedly not be reprinted.

== Track listing ==
All songs written by Chris Ballew, unless otherwise noted.

No.	Title	Writer(s)	Length
1.	"Slow Slow Fly"		3:25
2.	"Crappy Ghost"		2:26
3.	"Good Morning Tycoon"		2:28
4.	"Poor Little Me"		2:39
5.	"Rooftops in Spain"		2:37
6.	"Stay with Me"	Ballew, Tad Hutchison	2:31
7.	"Crown Victoria"		3:10
8.	"Electric Spider"		2:37
9.	"Finger Monster"		2:39
10.	"Flea Verses Mite"		2:17
11.	"Innocent Bird"		3:04
12.	"Ohio"	Ballew, Dave Thiele	2:08
13.	"She's a Nurse"		2:59
14.	"Truckstop on the Moon" (vinyl release only)		3:43

== Song origins ==
Many of the songs on the album had previously been recorded by one of Ballew's various musical projects. These include:

- "Poor Little Me", which dates back to the Smell Me Fist cassette released by EGG in 1988.
- "Finger Monster", which is a Presidents song that began life in 1996.
- "Slow Slow Fly", which was previously recorded, with many different lyrics, for The Giraffes' 1998 album 13 Other Dimensions. "Good Morning Tycoon" and "Stay with Me" were recorded for The Giraffes' Zero Friction (2000) album.
- "Electric Spider", which previously appeared on The Feelings Hijackers' 2005 album T.F.H., although it dates from even earlier than that. This version has completely different lyrics.
- "Rooftops in Spain" and "Truckstop on the Moon", which were both previously released as bonus tracks on some versions of The Presidents' 2008 album These Are the Good Times People.
- "Flea Versus Mite", which is a reworking, with all new lyrics, of the song "This Is a Blitz", a free-to-download ode by The Presidents to the mascot of the Seattle Seahawks from 2009.

== Personnel ==
- Chris Ballew – vocals, bass guitar
- Andrew McKeag – guitar
- Jason Finn – drums
- John Roderick – backing vocals on "Crown Victoria"
- Martin Feveyear – producing, additional vocals on "Poor Little Me"
- Produced by Martin Feveyear and The Presidents of the United States of America at Jupiter Studios, Seattle, WA.
- Mixed & mastered by Martin Feveyear at Jupiter Studios.
- Recorded by Martin Feveyear, assisted by Jonas G. at Jupiter Studios.
- Tracks 3, 5, 13 and 14 recorded by Kurt Bloch at Chroma Sound, Seattle, WA.
- Art direction and layout by Derek Vander Griend and Evan Bross.
