= Meg Greenfield =

American journalist

- Born: Mary Ellen Greenfield; December 27, 1930; Seattle, Washington, U.S.
- Died: May 13, 1999 (aged 68); Georgetown, Washington, D.C., U.S.
- Education: The Bush School; Smith College; University of Cambridge
- Occupation: Editorial writer
- Employers: The Washington Post; Newsweek

Mary Ellen Greenfield (December 27, 1930 – May 13, 1999), known as Meg Greenfield, was an American editorial writer who worked for The Washington Post and Newsweek. She was also a Washington, D.C. insider, known for her wit. Greenfield won a Pulitzer Prize for Editorial Writing.

A book she authored was published posthumously.

== Life and career ==
Greenfield was born in Seattle, the daughter of Lorraine (Nathan) and Lewis James Greenfield. Her family was Jewish. She attended The Bush School and graduated summa cum laude from Smith College in 1952. She also studied at Cambridge University as a Fulbright Scholar and was friends there with Norman Podhoretz, who also went on to a career in journalism.

She became influential in a male-dominated world and a close confidante of Post publisher Katharine Graham. She spent 20 years as the editorial page editor for The Washington Post and 25 years as a columnist for Newsweek. She influenced generations of Washington Post writers.

When diagnosed with cancer, Greenfield partly retired to Bainbridge Island in her native Washington, where she wrote a posthumously published memoir entitled Washington. She died of the disease, at age 68.

Greenfield was portrayed by Carrie Coon in 2017 film, The Post.

== Awards and honors ==
- Greenfield won the 1978 Pulitzer Prize for Editorial Writing.

== Bibliography ==
- Greenfield, Meg (2001). Washington. Public Affairs. ISBN 978-1586480271.
