= II (The Presidents of the United States of America album) =

Studio album by The Presidents of the United States of America
- Released: November 5, 1996
- Recorded: August 1996 ("Basketball Dream" vocals recorded 1987)
- Studios: Studio Litho, Seattle, Washington
- Genres: Alternative rock; grunge; punk rock; pop-punk
- Length: 39:47
- Label: Columbia
- Producers: Chris Ballew; Dave Dederer; Jason Finn; Craig Montgomery

The Presidents of the United States of America chronology
The Presidents of the United States of America (1995)	II (1996)	Rarities (1997)

Singles from II
- 1. "Mach 5" Released: October 21, 1996; 2. "Volcano" Released: 1997 (Aus); 3. "Tiki God" Released: 1998 (Aus)

Professional ratings
Review scores
Source	Rating
AllMusic	3/5 stars
The A.V. Club	Unfavorable
Chicago Tribune	2/4 stars
Entertainment Weekly	A−
Kerrang!	5/5 stars
Los Angeles Times	2.5/4 stars
Rolling Stone	2/5 stars

II is the second studio album by the American rock band The Presidents of the United States of America. It was released via Columbia Records on November 5, 1996, coinciding with the United States presidential election.

== Background ==
The album included a few songs that originally appeared on Froggystyle, a self-released cassette that was recorded before their debut album, The Presidents of the United States of America. These songs, which were re-recorded for this album, were "L.I.P", then known as "Little Indian Princess", "Lunatic to Love" and "Puffy Little Shoes". Also, "Twig" was re-recorded, as it was previously recorded as a B-side to a "Lump" single, where it was known as "Twig in the Wind". That version was later released on Rarities as "Twig (Semi Acoustic Version)".

== Track listing ==
All songs by The Presidents of the United States of America.

No.	Title	Length
1.	"Ladies and Gentlemen, Part 1"	1:39
2.	"Lunatic to Love"	2:57
3.	"Volcano"	2:58
4.	"Mach 5"	3:15
5.	"Twig"	2:37
6.	"Bug City"	3:05
7.	"Bath of Fire"	2:57
8.	"Tiki God"	2:58
9.	"L.I.P." (Little Indian Princess)	3:20
10.	"Froggie"	3:10
11.	"Toob Amplifier"	1:22
12.	"Supermodel"	2:49
13.	"Puffy Little Shoes"	4:59
14.	"Ladies and Gentlemen, Part 2"	3:03
15.	"Basketball Dream" (hidden track)	0:55
Total length:		39:47

"Basketball Dream" features a boy, Tony Ballew (a relative of Chris Ballew), describing a dream he had about Magic Johnson - for this reason, the track is often mislabeled "Magic Johnson Dream". Chris Ballew can be heard faintly whispering the lyrics underneath the boy. The recording of Tony's voice, with a different musical backing, previously appeared on Feel Good, an album by Ballew's pre-PUSA band Egg, in 1989. The same recording from Feel Good was first released on the self-titled album by The Dukes o' Pop, another pre-PUSA project of Ballew's, in 1987.

== Personnel ==
The Presidents of the United States of America

- Chris Ballew – basitar, bass, lead vocals, keyboards
- Dave Dederer – guitbass, guitar, background vocals
- Jason Finn – drums, percussion, background vocals

Additional personnel

- Dave Thiele – piano, percussion
- Tony Ballew – baby voice on "Basketball Dream"
- Mark Sandman – tritar on "Froggie"
- S. Craig Montgomery – co-producing, engineering
- Wally Traugott – mastering
- Lance Mercer – photography
- Jerry Finn – mixing
- Doug Erb – art directing
- Tom Smurdon – assistant engineering

== Charts ==
=== Weekly charts ===
Chart (1996–1997)	Peak position
Australian Albums (ARIA)	3
Canadian Albums (The Record)	5
Finnish Albums (Suomen virallinen lista)	30
French Albums (SNEP)	43
New Zealand Albums (RMNZ)	20
Norwegian Albums (VG-lista)	35
Swedish Albums (Sverigetopplistan)	29
Swiss Albums (Schweizer Hitparade)	50
US Billboard 200)	31

=== Year-end charts ===
Chart (1996)	Position
Australian Albums (ARIA)	37

== Certifications ==
Region	Certification	Certified units/sales
Australia (ARIA)	Platinum	70,000^{^}
Canada (Music Canada)	Gold	50,000^{^}
United States (RIAA)	Gold	500,000^{^}
^{^} Shipments figures based on certification alone.
