= The Presidents of the United States of America (album) =

1995 studio album by the Presidents of the United States of America

Studio album by The Presidents of the United States of America
- Released: March 10, 1995
- Recorded: 1994
- Studios: The Laundry Room (Seattle); Egg (Seattle)
- Genre: Alternative rock
- Length: 37:54
- Label: PopLlama/Columbia
- Producers: Conrad Uno, Chris Ballew, Dave Dederer

The Presidents of the United States of America chronology
Froggystyle (1994)	The Presidents of the United States of America (1995)	II (1996)

Singles from The Presidents of the United States of America
- 1. "Kitty" Released: 1995 (EU); 2. "Lump" Released: August 8, 1995; 3. "Peaches" Released: February 6, 1996; 4. "Dune Buggy" Released: July 8, 1996

The Presidents of the United States of America is the self-titled debut studio album by the American alternative rock band The Presidents of the United States of America, released on March 10, 1995, via PopLlama Records. Columbia Records signed the band shortly after its release to handle increased distribution for the album.

Released during the grunge and punk music breakthrough-era, the album produced four singles—"Kitty", "Lump", "Peaches" and "Dune Buggy"—helping the group gain mainstream popularity. The Presidents of the United States of America received positive reviews, and has been certified triple Platinum by the RIAA.

== Background and recording ==
Chris Ballew and Dave Dederer met while attending The Bush School in Seattle. In the 1980s and early 1990s they collaborated on various musical projects. Ballew returned to Seattle in the summer of 1993, and he and Dederer formed what would become The Presidents of the United States of America that autumn. Initially a drummerless duo, they performed a half-dozen or so shows in late 1993 as "The Lo-Fis", "The Dynamic Duo", and "Pure Frosting." Ballew eventually came upon the name "The Presidents of the United States of America." Shortly after settling on their name, Ballew and Dederer added drummer Jason Finn. In early December 1993, the band played their first show as a trio at The Romper Room in Seattle. At the time, Finn was also the drummer in the band Love Battery, who had recently changed record labels from Sub Pop to Atlas Records, an A&M subsidiary.

In early 1994, The Presidents recorded a 10-song cassette, Froggystyle, at Laundry Room Studios. The band sold the cassette at shows in 1994. Finn also sold the cassette from behind the bar of Seattle's legendary Comet Tavern, where he tended bar.

In 1994, the Presidents signed with the tiny Seattle label PopLlama Records and released their self-titled debut in the following year, featuring several remixed tracks from Froggystyle. The band also released a limited edition blue vinyl 7-inch single, "Fuck California", on C/Z Records. Columbia Records signed the band shortly thereafter and re-released the album in late July 1995. Driven by the singles "Lump", "Peaches", and "Kitty", their debut album proved to be a smash, eventually selling over three million copies.

== Composition ==
Critics praised the band's catchy, humorous, and self-deprecating songs, which were a major departure from the grunge/post-grunge sound present on the airwaves. The album received Grammy nominations in 1995 and 1996. Though "Peaches" met the most critical success, the band credits "Lump" as their favorite single. The song's strange lyrics came from a dream that Ballew had while fighting pneumonia. The antibiotics he was taking caused an allergic reaction that produced several consecutive nights of wild and crazy dreams. The lyrics for "Peaches" were written about a crush Ballew used to have on a girl. According to him, she had a peach tree in the front of her yard, and when he finally summoned the courage to go talk to her, he stood under the tree and smashed peaches in his fist until he decided not to talk to her.

== Packaging and release ==
Originally, the album was released in March 1995 on the independent Seattle label, PopLlama Records. This version of the album was noticeably different than other subsequent releases. The inside cover featured a picture of the band with Bill Clinton, who was the president of the United States at the time. The CD looked like a food inspection stamp. "Feather Pluckn" included a verse which was an homage of the Beatles' "I've Got a Feeling". The PopLlama release was also pressed on yellow vinyl with two bonus tracks. After the band signed to Columbia Records, the album was re-released on July 25, 1995. This version's inside cover featured a picture of the band members painted in red, white and blue in multiple pictures. The CD looks like a vinyl record label. All of the songs were re-mixed, and "Feather Pluckn" lost the "I've Got a Feeling" verse.

In 2004, the band independently re-released the album as a Ten Year Super Bonus Special Anniversary Edition. It featured 13 bonus tracks, including B-sides and demos, and (except for the Australian release) a bonus DVD of music videos and performance footage. This version features the food inspection stamp-like design that originally appeared on the 1995 edition. The insert picture features a collage of band performances. In addition, the liner notes were slightly updated. In 2008, the album was re-released on CD for a final time by the band's then-current label, Fugitive Recordings, minus the bonus tracks.

In February 2020, the group announced a vinyl reissue via Kickstarter.

== Reception ==
=== Commercial performance ===
The Presidents of the United States of America peaked at number six on the Billboard 200. As of 1997, the album has shipped over three million copies and has been certified triple platinum.

=== Critical reception ===
Professional ratings
Review scores
Source	Rating
AllMusic	4/5 stars
Christgau's Consumer Guide	(1-star Honorable Mention)
Drowned in Sound	8/10
Encyclopedia of Popular Music	4/5 stars
Entertainment Weekly	D
NME	7/10
Paste	8.5/10
Q	3/5 stars
The Rolling Stone Album Guide	3/5 stars
Select	4/5 medals

Critical reception to The Presidents of the United States of America was mostly positive. Johnny Loftus of AllMusic retrospectively wrote that "their quirky take on punk-pop did help expand the palette of MTV and alternative radio, and make their oddball singles part of the enduring sound of the era."

== Track listing ==
All lyrics are written by Chris Ballew, except where noted; all music is composed by Chris Ballew, Dave Dederer & Jason Finn, except where noted.

No.	Title	Length
1.	"Kitty"	3:23
2.	"Feather Pluckn" (3:19 on original PopLlama CD)	2:57
3.	"Lump"	2:14
4.	"Stranger"	3:04
5.	"Boll Weevil"	3:16
6.	"Peaches"	2:51
7.	"Dune Buggy"	2:44
8.	"Wake Up" (bonus track on European yellow vinyl LP edition)	2:38
9.	"We Are Not Going to Make It" (Ben Reiser)	1:52
10.	"Kick Out the Jams" (Rob Tyner, Wayne Kramer, Fred "Sonic" Smith, Michael Davis & Dennis Thompson)	1:25
11.	"Body"	4:11
12.	"Back Porch"	2:59
13.	"Candy"	3:16
14.	"Naked and Famous"	3:42
15.	"Twig in the Wind" (bonus track on European yellow vinyl LP edition; re-recorded as "Twig" for II)	2:55

Ten Year Super Bonus Special Anniversary Edition bonus tracks

No.	Title	Length
14.	"Confusion" (from the Home Alive benefit compilation Home Alive: The Art of Self Defense)	2:44
15.	"Candy Cigarette" (B-side of various versions of the "Lump" single)	2:02
16.	"Wake Up" (B-side of the "Lump" 7-inch picture disc and U.S. cassette single)	2:40
17.	"Carolyn's Booty" (B-side of the "Fuck California" 7-inch, and of various versions of the "Lump" single)	2:17
18.	"Fuck California" (7-inch on C/Z Records)	3:05
19.	"Puffy Little Shoes" (B-side of the "Naked and Famous" 7-inch; re-recorded for II)	3:35
20.	"Kitty" (demo)	1:26
21.	"Lump" (demo)	2:39
22.	"Stranger" (demo)	2:50
23.	"Boll Weevil" (demo)	2:06
24.	"Candy" (demo)	3:51
25.	"Naked and Famous" (Boston demo; performed by Chris Ballew's pre-PUSA band Egg)	2:36
26.	"Naked and Famous" (New York demo)	2:08

14–17 also appear on various editions of the "Peaches" single. 20–24 and 26 are performed entirely by Chris Ballew.
Ten Year Super Bonus Special Anniversary Edition Super Bonus Thrillpack DVD

No.	Title	Length
1.	"Lump" (official video)
2.	"Lump (Version 2)" (intended as the official video)
3.	"Peaches" (official video)
4.	"Mach 5" (official video)
5.	"Jupiter" (live, featuring Duff McKagan on bass)
6.	"Volcano" (live, featuring Washington State's then-governor Gary Locke on introduction and backing vocals)
7.	"Lunatic to Love" (live)
8.	"Tiny Explosions" (live)

The DVD also includes a commentary track by the band.

== Personnel ==
The Presidents of the United States of America

- Chris Ballew – vocals, two-string basitar
- Dave Dederer – three-string guitbass, vocals
- Jason Finn – no-string drums, backing vocals

Additional musician

- Kim Thayil – guitar on "Naked and Famous"

Technical (PopLlama edition)

- Conrad Uno – co-producer, engineer (tracks 2–4, 6–9, 11–12), mastering
- Chris Ballew – co-producer
- Dave Dederer – co-producer, front cover photo
- Barrett Jones – engineer (tracks 1, 5, 10, 13)
- Pete Gerrald – mastering
- Mark Guenther – second engineer
- Art Chantry – design
- San Pacific International – sculptures
- Lance Mercer – back cover photo

Additional technical credits (Columbia edition)

- David Kahne – mixing (tracks 3–4, 6, 8, 10–11, 13)
- Steve Culp – mix engineer (tracks 3–4, 6, 8, 10–11, 13)
- Wally Traugott – mastering
- Doug Erb – design update
- Marty Temme – tray card photo

== Charts ==
=== Weekly charts ===
Chart (1995–1996)	Peak position
Australian Albums (ARIA)	3
Canada Albums (The Record)	5
Finnish Albums (Suomen virallinen lista)	25
French Albums (SNEP)	40
Dutch Albums (Album Top 100)	18
New Zealand Albums (RMNZ)	3
Swedish Albums (Sverigetopplistan)	18
UK Albums (Official Charts)	14
US Billboard 200	6
US Heatseekers Albums (Billboard)	3

=== Year-end charts ===
Chart (1995)	Position
US Billboard 200	185
Chart (1996)	Position
Australian Albums (ARIA)	7
US Billboard 200	24

== Certifications ==
Region	Certification	Certified units/sales
Australia (ARIA)	4× Platinum	280,000^{^}
Canada (Music Canada)	4× Platinum	400,000^{^}
New Zealand (RMNZ)	Platinum	15,000^{^}
United Kingdom (BPI)	Gold	100,000^{^}
United States (RIAA)	3× Platinum	3,000,000^{^}
^{^} Shipments figures based on certification alone.

== Release history ==
Region	Date	Label	Format	Catalog	Ref.
United States	March 10, 1995	PopLlama Records	CD	PLCD003	
United States	July 25, 1995	Columbia Records	CD	CK 67291	
Europe	July 25, 1995	Columbia Records	CD, LP, cassette	481039	
Australia	September 25, 1995	Columbia Records	CD, cassette	481039	
United States	November 4, 2004	PUSA Inc.	CD/DVD	PSA 2	
Europe	April 25, 2005	PUSA Inc.	CD/DVD	PSA 2	
United States	June 10, 2008	Fugitive Records	CD	FGD16010	
United States	April 2020	PUSACORP	LP	PUSA0025	
Various	July 31, 2026	PUSA Music	Digital download	—N/a	
