= Mach 5 (song) =

Single by Presidents of the United States of America

from the album II
- Released: October 21, 1996
- Genre: Grunge; punk rock
- Length: 3:15
- Label: Columbia
- Songwriter: Chris Ballew
- Producer: Presidents of the United States of America

Presidents of the United States of America singles chronology
"Dune Buggy" (1996)	"Mach 5" (1996)	"Supersonics" (1996)

"Mach 5" is a song by the American alternative rock band The Presidents of the United States of America. It was released in 1996 as a single from their album II. The single reached number 29 on the charts in the UK.

The song's lyrics describe the experience of a child playing violently with firecrackers and Matchbox cars while pretending to be the hero of the cartoon Speed Racer. The single's cover shows children on tricycles wearing helmets and goggles like the cartoon character.

== Track listing ==
=== Initial pressing ===
1. "Mach 5" – 3:15
2. "Tremelo Blooz" – 2:50
3. "Tiki Lounge God" – 3:10
4. "Carolyn's Bootie" (live) – 3:35

=== Australian version ===
1. "Mach 5" – 3:15
2. "Tremelo Blooz" – 2:50
3. "Body" (live) – 4:11
4. "Carolyn's Bootie" (live) – 3:35

== Charts ==
Chart (1996)	Peak position
Australia (ARIA)	29
New Zealand (Recorded Music NZ)	48
UK Singles (Official Charts)	29
UK Rock & Metal (Official Charts)	1
US Modern Rock Tracks (Billboard)	11
US Mainstream Rock Tracks (Billboard)	24
