= Dune Buggy (song) =

1996 single by the Presidents of the United States of America

Single by the Presidents of the United States of America

from the album The Presidents of the United States of America
- Released: July 8, 1996
- Length: 2:45
- Label: Columbia
- Songwriter: Chris Ballew
- Producer: The Presidents of the United States of America

The Presidents of the United States of America singles chronology
| "Ça plane pour moi" (1995) | "Dune Buggy" (1996) | "Mach 5" (1996) |

"Dune Buggy" is a song by the American alternative rock band the Presidents of the United States of America, released as the fourth and final single from their self-titled debut album (1995), on July 8, 1996. The song reached number two in Iceland, number 15 in the United Kingdom, number 16 in Australia, and number 29 in Ireland.

== Track listings ==
Initial pressing

1. "Dune Buggy" – 2:45
2. "Back Porch" (live) – 2:58
3. "Kick Out the Jams" (live) – 2:30
4. "Video Killed the Radio Star" (live) – 3:49

Australian Tour EP

1. "Dune Buggy" (video edit) – 2:44
2. "Dune Buggy" (LP version) – 3:08
3. "Back Porch" (live) – 2:58
4. "Video Killed the Radio Star" (live) – 3:49
5. "Confusion" – 2:45

== Charts ==
=== Weekly charts ===
| Chart (1996) | Peak position |
|---|---|
| Australia (ARIA) | 16 |
| Europe (Eurochart Hot 100) | 67 |
| Iceland (Íslenski Listinn Topp 40) | 2 |
| Ireland (IRMA) | 29 |
| Scottish Singles Sales (Official Charts) | 17 |
| UK Singles (Official Charts) | 15 |

=== Year-end charts ===
| Chart (1996) | Position |
|---|---|
| Iceland (Íslenski Listinn Topp 40) | 24 |
