= These Are the Good Times People =

Studio album by the Presidents of the United States of America
- Released: March 11, 2008
- Recorded: 2006–2007
- Genre: Alternative rock
- Length: 39:05
- Labels: Fugitive Recordings; Tooth & Nail
- Producer: Kurt Bloch

The Presidents of the United States of America chronology
Love Everybody (2004)	These Are the Good Times People (2008)	Kudos to You! (2014)

Singles from These Are the Good Times People
- 1. "Mixed Up S.O.B." Released: 2008; 2. "Ladybug" Released: 2008; 3. "Rot in the Sun" Released: 2009; 4. "More Bad Times" Released: 2009

These Are the Good Times People is the fifth album by the Presidents of the United States of America. It was released on March 11, 2008. This is their first album to feature Andrew McKeag rather than Dave Dederer on guitbass.

== Track listing ==
All songs written by Chris Ballew unless otherwise noted.

No.	Title	Writer(s)	Length
1.	"Mixed Up S.O.B."		3:05
2.	"Ladybug"		2:34
3.	"Sharpen Up Those Fangs"		3:05
4.	"More Bad Times"	Dan Leone, Dom Leone, Ballew, McKeag	2:59
5.	"French Girl"		3:04
6.	"Truckstop Butterfly"		2:04
7.	"Ghosts are Everywhere"	Ballew, McKeag, Finn	4:08
8.	"Loose Balloon"		2:45
9.	"Flame is Love"		2:39
10.	"So Lo So Hi"		2:18
11.	"Poor Turtle"		2:48
12.	"Rot in the Sun"		2:25
13.	"Warhead"	Ballew, Dale Peyser	1:54
14.	"Deleter"	Ballew, McKeag, Finn	3:17

"More Bad Times" is a loose cover of an Ed's Redeeming Qualities song.

=== Bonus Tracks ===
- "Rooftops in Spain" – 2:41 (UK iTunes / Japan CD)
- "Scrappy Puppy" – 2:54 (all iTunes)
- "Truckstop on the Moon" – 4:14 (Walmart mp3 store)
- "What the Hell" – 3:30 (Amazon / Napster)

== Personnel ==
- Chris Ballew – vocals, bass
- Andrew McKeag – guitars
- Jason Finn – drums
- Nikka Costa – vocals on "Deleter"
- Mark Hoyt – backing vocals on "Poor Turtle"
- The Love Lights Horn Section – on "Sharpen Up Those Fangs", "Ghosts are Everywhere" and "Deleter"
  - Jerimiah Austin – trumpet
  - Sarah Jerns – trumpet
  - Diana Dizard – baritone sax
- Martin Feveyear – mixing

== Response ==
Professional ratings
Aggregate scores
Source	Rating
Metacritic	(56/100)
Review scores
Source	Rating
AbsolutePunk	86%
Allmusic	4/5 stars
Billboard	(favorable)
Drowned in Sound	(3/10)
Mojo	3/5 stars
musicOMH	4/5 stars
PopMatters	5/10 stars
Q	3/5 stars
Uncut	1/5 stars

Critical response to These Are the Good Times People was mixed. The album received a Metacritic rating of 56 out of 100 based on "mixed or average reviews". musicOMH remarked, "There's nothing complicated on this album, but then when did things ever need to be complicated?" Allmusic said that in view of the lineup changes, the album is "perhaps their most eclectic album to date." Billboard found that while nothing on the album is as immediately memorable as "Lump" or "Peaches," several tracks "come across as less novelty-like as a result of songcraft." Uncut magazine felt the record was "the desperate death-throe of a rank '90s relic."
