= Peaches (The Presidents of the United States of America song) =

1996 single by the Presidents of the United States of America

Single by the Presidents of the United States of America

from the album The Presidents of the United States of America
- B-side: "Video Killed the Radio Star"; "Candy Cigarette"; "Carolyn's Bootie"; "Confusion"; "Wake Up"
- Released: February 6, 1996
- Studio: Robert Lang (Shoreline, Washington); Sony Music (New York City)
- Genre: Post-grunge; alternative rock; pop-punk
- Length: 2:51
- Label: Columbia; PopLlama
- Songwriter: Chris Ballew
- Producer: Conrad Uno

The Presidents of the United States of America singles chronology
| "Lump" (1995) | "Peaches" (1996) | "Ça Plane Pour Moi" (1996) |

"Peaches" is a song by American alternative rock band the Presidents of the United States of America. It was included on their self-titled debut album and released as a single in February 1996. The track was produced by Conrad Uno. The band members have acknowledged that "Peaches" borrows riffs from Bad Company's 1975 song "Feel Like Makin' Love".

The song was released worldwide as the third single from The Presidents of the United States of America. It peaked at number 29 on the US Billboard Hot 100 and number eight on the Billboard Modern Rock Tracks chart. Worldwide, the song reached number one in Iceland and the top 20 in Australia, Canada, Ireland, New Zealand, and the United Kingdom. It received a gold certification in Australia for shipments of over 35,000 units. In 1996, "Peaches" was nominated for a Grammy Award for Best Pop Performance by a Duo or Group with Vocal.

== Composition ==
Despite speculation that the lyrics contain innuendo, in an interview with American Songwriter magazine, the band's lead singer Chris Ballew explained that the song was inspired by two separate incidents: The first, which took place in Boston, involved Ballew taking LSD and going to the house of a woman he was attracted to. After knocking on her door and not receiving an answer, Ballew decided to wait for her underneath a nearby peach tree. According to Ballew, "There were peaches that had fallen, that were in various stages of decay. And ... I just started ... squeezing the peaches and mixing it with my desire for the girl and the desire for the peaches".

The second incident occurred later when Ballew had moved back to Seattle. While waiting for a bus, he overheard a homeless man repeatedly mutter under his breath, "I'm moving to the country, I'm gonna eat a lot of peaches." The phrase originally appeared in the 1971 song "Spanish Pipedream" by acclaimed American singer-songwriter John Prine from his self-titled album, the chorus of which is:

Blow up your TV
Throw away your paper
Go to the country
Build you a home
Plant a little garden
Eat a lot of peaches
Try an' find Jesus on your own.

The phrase stuck with Ballew, and after connecting it to his experience in Boston, he began to develop the lyrics for what would become "Peaches".

Ballew said he was emulating Nirvana in the verses by trying to sound "gnarly and growly".

Musically, Peaches is mainly a post-grunge and alternative rock song. It has also been described as pop-punk with influences of grunge.

== Music video ==
The music video features the band performing the song in an orchard filled with trees growing cans of peaches. A crate of the whole fruits rests on the ground between them, and the word "peaches" is written on the top of Ballew's head. During the song's instrumental break, the band is attacked by a group of ninjas attempting to capture them. They fight the ninjas for the remainder of the video and eventually defeat them.

For years, the video was only available in low quality online. On February 28, 2023, the video was remastered in HD and uploaded to YouTube.

== Formats and track listings ==
US 7-inch single

A. "Peaches"
B. "Video Killed the Radio Star"

US maxi-CD single

1. "Peaches" – 2:49
2. "Candy Cigarette" – 2:00
3. "Carolyn's Bootie" – 2:15
4. "Confusion" – 2:45
5. "Wake Up" – 2:37

US cassette single

A. "Peaches" – 2:49
B. "Candy Cigarette" – 2:00

UK CD single

1. "Peaches" – 2:49
2. "Feather Pluckn" (live) – 3:17
3. "Boll Weevil" (live) – 3:14
4. "Dune Buggy" (live) – 2:43

UK 7-inch picture disc single

A. "Peaches" – 2:49
B. "Confusion" – 2:43

Australian CD single

1. "Peaches" – 2:49
2. "Wake Up" – 2:40
3. "Monkey River" – 4:05

== Charts ==
=== Weekly charts ===
| Chart (1996) | Peak position |
|---|---|
| Australia (ARIA) | 13 |
| Canada Top Singles (RPM) | 15 |
| Canada Rock/Alternative (RPM) | 1 |
| Europe (Eurochart Hot 100) | 37 |
| France (SNEP) | 34 |
| Iceland (Íslenski Listinn Topp 40) | 1 |
| Ireland (IRMA) | 17 |
| Netherlands (Dutch Top 40) | 37 |
| Netherlands (Single Top 100) | 29 |
| New Zealand (Recorded Music NZ) | 9 |
| Scottish Singles Sales (Official Charts) | 10 |
| Sweden (Sverigetopplistan) | 28 |
| UK Singles (Official Charts) | 8 |
| US Billboard Hot 100 | 29 |
| US Album Rock Tracks (Billboard) | 24 |
| US Modern Rock Tracks (Billboard) | 8 |
| US Top 40/Mainstream (Billboard) | 23 |

=== Year-end charts ===
| Chart (1996) | Position |
|---|---|
| Australia (ARIA) | 58 |
| Canada Rock/Alternative (RPM) | 16 |
| Iceland (Íslenski Listinn Topp 40) | 14 |
| US Modern Rock Tracks (Billboard) | 66 |

== Certifications ==
| Region | Certification | Certified units/sales |
|---|---|---|
| Australia (ARIA) | Gold | 35,000^{^} |
| New Zealand (RMNZ) | Platinum | 30,000^{‡} |
^{^} Shipments figures based on certification alone.^{‡} Sales+streaming figures based on certification alone.
