= Kitty (The Presidents of the United States of America song) =

1995 single by the Presidents of the United States of America

Single by the Presidents of the United States of America

from the album The Presidents of the United States of America
- Released: 1995
- Recorded: 1994
- Genre: Grunge; pop-punk
- Length: 3:23
- Label: Columbia
- Songwriter: Chris Ballew
- Producers: The Presidents of the United States of America, Conrad Uno

The Presidents of the United States of America singles chronology
"Naked and Famous" (1994)	"Kitty" (1995)	"Lump" (1995)

"Kitty" is a song by the American alternative rock band the Presidents of the United States of America. It originally appeared on the demo tape Froggystyle. This version was titled "Kitty at My Foot". The song was later included on the band's self-titled debut album.

According to Dave Dederer, the song was based "as far as I know" on a true story about "a bad little cat that lived in some [apartment] Chris shared with some folks in Boston".

== Description ==
The song describes a man's desire to pet a cat that has been out all night, implied to be a feral cat. After a moment of bliss, the cat turns on him and scratches him and he decides to let it spend the night outside again.

== Music video ==
A music video for "Kitty" was filmed on October 25, 1995. It depicts a cat's point of view in one take. In 2007, the video was uploaded to their YouTube channel. In February 2023, it was remastered in HD.

== Track listing ==
=== Initial pressing ===
1. "Kitty" - 3:23
2. "Kitty" (clean edit) - 3:23

=== Maxi CD ===
1. "Kitty" - 3:23
2. "Peaches" (live) - 3:15
3. "Lump" (live) - 2:17

== Charts ==
Chart (1996)	Peak position
Australia (ARIA)	19
New Zealand (Recorded Music NZ)	30
US Modern Rock Tracks (Billboard)	13
