= Chris Ballew =

American musician (born 1965)

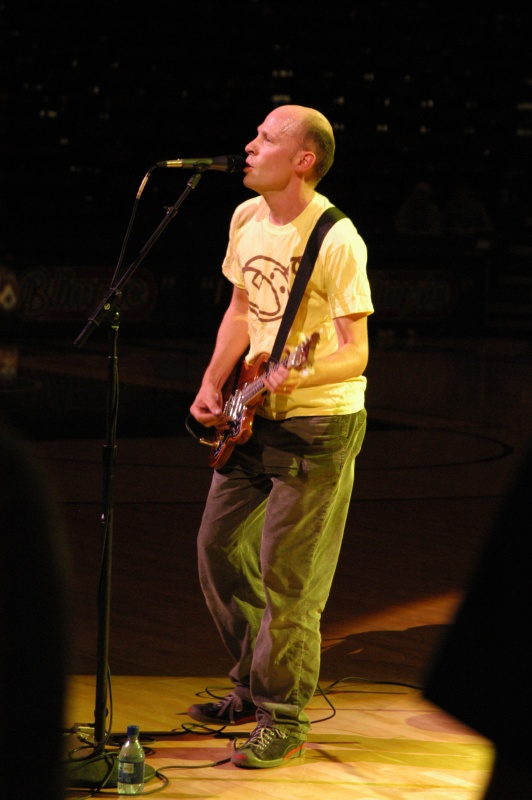
- Ballew in 2005

Background information
- Born: Christopher Ballew; May 28, 1965 (age 61)
- Origin: Seattle, Washington, U.S.
- Genres: Alternative rock; post-grunge; power pop; grunge; pop-punk
- Instruments: Vocals; bass; guitar; keyboards
- Years active: 1986–present
- Member of: Caspar Babypants
- Formerly of: Egg; Balls; The Presidents of the United States of America; The Giraffes
- Website: chrisballew.org

Christopher Ballew (born May 28, 1965) is an American musician best known as the lead singer and bassist of the alternative rock group the Presidents of the United States of America. He also performed and recorded as a children's artist under the pseudonym Caspar Babypants, from 2009 until 2021.

Ballew's career in music traces back to his street performances in a duo called Egg, during his time in Boston in the late 1980s and early 1990s. Following a brief period in Los Angeles performing with Beck, Ballew returned to Washington and formed the Presidents of the United States of America in 1993, a band that lasted until 2015. In 1998, he started a solo project known as the Giraffes, which turned into a band the following year. In 2009, he launched Caspar Babypants, a children's music project that has since released numerous albums. He has also issued music under his own name. Ballew uses unconventional instruments, notably a two-string "basitar", and he performs without distortion pedals, relying on the natural distortion of the amplifier. He is married to collage artist Kate Endle.

== Biography ==
=== Early life and musical beginnings ===
Ballew grew up in Seattle and attended middle and high school at Bush School, where he met Dave Dederer, with whom he would later form the Presidents of the United States of America. As a child, he was musically inspired by the Beatles. In the late 1980s and early '90s, Ballew lived in Boston, where he performed as a street musician in a duo called Egg with Phil Franklin (later of Caroliner Rainbow and Sunburned Hand of the Man). Many of Ballew's songs with Egg would become well-known Presidents songs, most notably "Naked and Famous", which is performed by Egg as a bonus track on a 2005 reissue of the Presidents' eponymous debut album. The two members of Egg were also part of the experimental triple-bass guitar ensemble Balls, which released a 12-inch EP in 1991. While in Boston, Ballew also played briefly with Mary Lou Lord, and with Mark Sandman of Treat Her Right and Morphine, in a duo called Supergroup, in which they developed the oddly-stringed instruments that would become a staple of both the Presidents' and Morphine's sound.

=== The Presidents of the United States of America ===
Ballew moved to Los Angeles in the early 1990s, where he shared an apartment with musician Beck and played in his live band. Ballew told Seattle Weekly that playing with Beck "was the beginning of my professional career as a guy getting paid to make music." He returned to his native Washington in 1993 and started the Presidents of the United States of America. The band released six studio albums, then split up in July 2015.

In 1998, Ballew released a solo album credited to the Giraffes. The recording project turned into a band between 1999 and 2000. For the live version of the Giraffes, Ballew was joined by Jason Staczek (organ, clarinet) and Mike Musburger (drums).

=== Caspar Babypants ===
Ballew's first brush with children's music came in 2002, when he recorded and donated an album of traditional children's songs to the nonprofit Program for Early Parent Support, titled PEPS Sing a Long! Although this was a positive experience for him, he did not consider making music for children until he met his wife, collage artist Kate Endle. Her art inspired Ballew to consider making music that "sounded like her art looked", as he has said. Ballew began writing original songs and digging up nursery rhymes and folk songs in the public domain to interpret and make his own. The first album, Here I Am!, was recorded during the summer of 2008 and released in February 2009.

In 2009, Ballew launched a project targeted toward toddlers, called Caspar Babypants. Ballew uses a three-string acoustic guitar when performing Caspar Babypants songs. Caspar Babypants has released numerous albums, all with exclamatory titles such as Here I Am!, More Please!, This Is Fun!, Sing Along!, Hot Dog!, I Found You!, Baby Beatles!, Rise and Shine!, Night Night!, Beatles Baby!, Away We Go!, Winter Party!, Jump for Joy!, Keep It Real!, Flying High!, Bug Out!, and Happy Heart!. In 2021, Ballew announced that he would be retiring the Caspar Babypants persona, and he released the final album under the moniker, titled Easy Breezy!.

=== Other projects ===
In 2015, fifteen years after the last official release, Chris Ballew put together We Hear Music, a 33-track double album consisting of previously unreleased Giraffes material. The record was shared privately with a few fans through the internet, with a note allowing the recipients to redistribute the music freely.

Ballew also publishes as a solo artist under his own name. His first album, I Am Not Me, came out in July 2021. In 2022, he released two albums, Soul Unfolded and Primitive God.

In June 2022, he performed "Peaches" with "Weird Al" Yankovic.

== Equipment ==
During his time with the Presidents, Ballew was endorsed by Epiphone Guitars and Orange amplifiers, utilizing an Epiphone SG-400 guitar (set up as a two-string "basitar"), as well as an AD200B MK 3 200-Watt Bass Head from Orange. He does not use any distortion pedals live, just the natural distortion of the amp. Regarding his two-string "basitar", Ballew admits: "I'm technically not really a bass player, although, I play as if I'm playing bass lines, a lot of times I strum like (on a) guitar and make chords."

== Personal life ==
Ballew is married to collage artist Kate Endle.

== Discography ==
with the Presidents of the United States of America

- The Presidents of the United States of America (1995)
- II (1996)
- Rarities (1997)
- Pure Frosting (1998)
- Lump (2000)
- Freaked Out and Small (2000)
- Love Everybody (2004)
- These Are the Good Times People (2008)
- Kudos to You! (2014)

with Balls

- We Will Grow on You (1990)

with Egg

- "Emotional Cowboy" on the compilation EP A Kinder, Gentler Genocide (1990)

As Caspar

- Lint Cake (1991)
- Sonic Uke (1993)
- Caspar (1996)

with Caspar and Mollusk (aka Chris & Beck)

- Caspar and Mollusk (1995)

with Supergroup (aka Chris & Mark Sandman)

- "Supergroup" (single, 1995)

with the Minus 5

- The Lonesome Death of Buck McCoy (1997)

with the Giraffes

- 13 Other Dimensions (1998)
- The Days Are Filled with Years (2000)
- Zero Friction (2000)
- We Hear Music (2015)

with the Tycoons

- Is It Christmas Yet? (1998)

with Chris and Tad

- Hand Me That Door (2000)

with Subset (aka PUSA & Sir Mix-a-Lot)

- Addicted to the Fame (2000)

with Chris Ballew and Friends

- Program for Early Parent Support (PEPS): Sing with a Child (2002)

with Creepy Stick

- Creepy Stick (2005)

with the Feelings Hijackers

- T.F.H. (2005)
- Skeletal Remains (2007)

As Caspar Babypants

- Here I Am! (2009)
- More Please! (2009)
- PEPS Sing a Long! (2010)
- This Is Fun! (2010)
- Sing Along! (2011)
- Hot Dog! (2012)
- I Found You! (2012)
- Baby Beatles! (2013)
- Rise and Shine! (2014)
- Night Night! (2015)
- Beatles Baby! (2015)
- Away We Go! (2016)
- Winter Party! (2016)
- Jump for Joy! (2017)
- Sleep Tight! (2018)
- Keep It Real! (2018)
- Best Beatles! (2019)
- Flying High! (2019)
- Bug Out! (2020)
- Happy Heart! (2020)
- Easy Breezy! (2021)

Solo

- My First Computer (2003)
- Like to Boogie (2004)
- "Run World, Run" (2005) (Soundtrack to a short Flash advertisement for Brooks Running)
- I Am Not Me (2021)
- Soul Unfolded (2022)
- Primitive God (2022)
- Bone by Bone (2023)
- Laying Low (2023)
- Power Trip (2024)
- Void Crusher (2024)
- Truth and Dare (2025)
- Ready to Pop (2025)
- Starting to Get Light (2026)
- Newborn Human (2026)
