= Lump (song) =

1995 single by the Presidents of the United States of America

Single by the Presidents of the United States of America

from the album The Presidents of the United States of America
- Released: August 8, 1995
- Studio: Egg (Brooklyn)
- Genre: Post-grunge; alternative rock
- Length: 2:12
- Label: Columbia
- Songwriters: The Presidents of the United States of America; Chris Ballew
- Producers: Conrad Uno; Chris Ballew; Dave Dederer

The Presidents of the United States of America singles chronology
"Kitty" (1995)	"Lump" (1995)	"Peaches" (1996)

Music video
- "Lump" on YouTube

"Lump" is a song by alternative rock band the Presidents of the United States of America. It was released in August 1995 by Columbia Records and included on their self-titled debut album (1995). The song reached number one on the US Billboard Modern Rock Tracks chart the same year. Composer Chris Ballew said that the lyrics combined his own history of having a benign tumor in the head with a vision he had of a woman in a swamp, while employing the word "lump" because Ballew was fond of it. The musical part was described by Ballew as him "trying to write a Buzzcocks song". Ballew considers it his favorite composition. The music video for the song was directed by Roman Coppola. "Lump" has been covered or remade by several artists, including the Johnstones and "Weird Al" Yankovic.

== Musical style ==
Musically, Lump is mainly a post-grunge and alternative rock song. It has also been described as pop-punk with influences of grunge and pop rock.

== Critical reception ==
Andrew Mueller from Melody Maker said, "'Lump' is a frantically grinning, gurning, hyperactive lurch that evokes nothing more than visions of retribution involving a plank with a nail through one end." Pan-European magazine Music & Media wrote, "Taken from the band's debut album, 'Lump' clocks in at just over two minutes. And it's so cool you could play it twice in place of those dismal four-minute rock operas churned out by other US-rockers. Full points to Chris Ballew's tongue-in cheek vocals–one of the best things to happen to alternative rock this year." Mark Beaumont from NME remarked "the hook-smattered stoopidity" of tunes like 'Lump'. He also named it Single of the Week, praising it as "pure, perfect, dumbass hedonistic pop." David Sinclair from The Times commented, "An intriguing amalgamation of Nirvana-influenced riffs and Weezer-ish harmony vocals, it is a post-grunge formula served up with lashings of oddball humour in place of the usual angst: Lump sat alone in a boggy marsh/Totally motionless except for her heart/Mud flowed up into Lump's pyjamas/She totally confused all the passing piranhas."

== Music video ==
The accompanying music video for "Lump", directed by American filmmaker Roman Coppola, takes place in a "boggy marsh" (as the opening lyrics state). The first half of the video shows the band performing in a swamp while the second half shows them on the stern of a barge in Elliott Bay, interspersed with a scene of the band performing in silhouette.

Another video was also made for the song. This version, commonly referred to as "Lump 2", was considered too disturbing and dark to be aired on MTV (reflecting the band's grunge and post-grunge origins). It features the band performing on a dark stage while various people lip sync the lines "She's lump!" during the chorus. This version can be found on "Ten Year Super Bonus Special Anniversary Edition" of the Presidents of the United States of America's debut album, and on their YouTube channel.

In 2023, both versions were re-uploaded to YouTube in high-definition, along with the other videos from the band's debut album.

== Track listings and formats ==
- European maxi-CD single
1. "Lump" – 2:12
2. "Carolyn's Bootie" – 2:15
3. "Candy Cigarette" – 2:00
- Australian CD single
1. "Lump" – 2:12
2. "Carolyn's Bootie" – 2:15
3. "Candy Cigarette" – 2:00
4. "Twig in the Wind" – 2:54
- UK 7-inch and cassette single
1. "Lump" – 2:12
2. "Wake Up" – 2:37
- European CD single and Dutch 12-inch vinyl
1. "Lump" – 2:12
2. "Carolyn's Bootie" – 2:15

== Credits and personnel ==
Credits and personnel are adapted from the "Lump" US promo CD liner notes.

- Chris Ballew – producer, vocals, two-string basitar
- Dave Dederer – producer, three-string guitbass, vocals
- Jason Finn – drums, vocals
- Conrad Uno – producer, recording at Egg Studios
- Mark Guenther – sound engineer
- David Kahne – mixing
- Steve Culp – mixing engineer
- Wally Traugott – mastering at Capitol Studios/Tower Mastering

== Charts ==
=== Weekly charts ===
Chart (1995–1996)	Peak position
Australia (ARIA)	11
Belgium (Ultratop 50 Wallonia)	28
Canada Top Singles (RPM)	21
Canada Rock/Alternative (RPM)	1
Europe (Eurochart Hot 100)	13
France (SNEP)	10
Ireland (IRMA)	27
Netherlands (Dutch Top 40 Tipparade)	19
Netherlands (Single Top 100 Tipparade)	10
New Zealand (Recorded Music NZ)	8
Scottish Singles Sales (Official Charts)	10
UK Singles (Official Charts)	15
US Hot 100 Airplay (Billboard)	21
US Album Rock Tracks (Billboard)	7
US Modern Rock Tracks (Billboard)	1
US Top 40/Mainstream (Billboard)	26

=== Year-end charts ===
Chart (1995)	Position
France (SNEP)	68
US Modern Rock Tracks (Billboard)	12

Chart (1996)	Position
Australia (ARIA)	86
New Zealand (RIANZ)	38
US Modern Rock Tracks (Billboard)	99

== Certifications ==
Region	Certification	Certified units/sales
Australia (ARIA)	Gold	35,000^{^}
United Kingdom (BPI)	Silver	200,000^{‡}
^{^} Shipments figures based on certification alone.^{‡} Sales+streaming figures based on certification alone.

== Release history ==
Region	Date	Format(s)	Label(s)	Ref.
Australia	August 8, 1995	CD	Columbia	
United States	August 8, 1995	Rock radio	Columbia	
United States	September 26, 1995	Contemporary hit radio	Columbia	
United Kingdom	December 27, 1995	7-inch vinyl; CD; cassette	Columbia	

== Parodies and covers ==
- "Weird Al" Yankovic released a parody version of the song known as "Gump", a joking tribute to Forrest Gump. Notably, the last line of this parody, "and that's all I have to say about that" would later be used by the Presidents of the United States of America in their subsequent live performances of the song. Yankovic would later return the favor by covering "Peaches" on The Unfortunate Return of the Ridiculously Self-Indulgent, Ill-Advised Vanity Tour with a special appearance by Ballew.
- Comedian Brian Posehn recorded a skit for his 2020 comedy metal album Grandpa Metal called "My Phone Call with Weird Al", featuring Yankovic, which references both "Lump" and "Gump", in which Posehn is trying to get Yankovic's permission to record a parody called "Trump" about president of the United States of America Donald Trump, and Yankovic unsuccessfully tries to inform Posehn that "Gump" is a parody of the Presidents of the United States of America song "Lump".
- ApologetiX also recorded a parody entitled "Plump", describing King Eglon and his rule over Israel.
- Canadian ska punk band the Johnstones covered "Lump" on their 2008 EP SEX.
- The Blackout also covered "Lump" and it features on the end of the group's album, Hope, released in 2011.

== See also ==
- Number one modern rock hits of 1995
- List of RPM Rock/Alternative number-one singles (Canada)
