= The Presidents of the United States of America (band) =

American alternative rock band

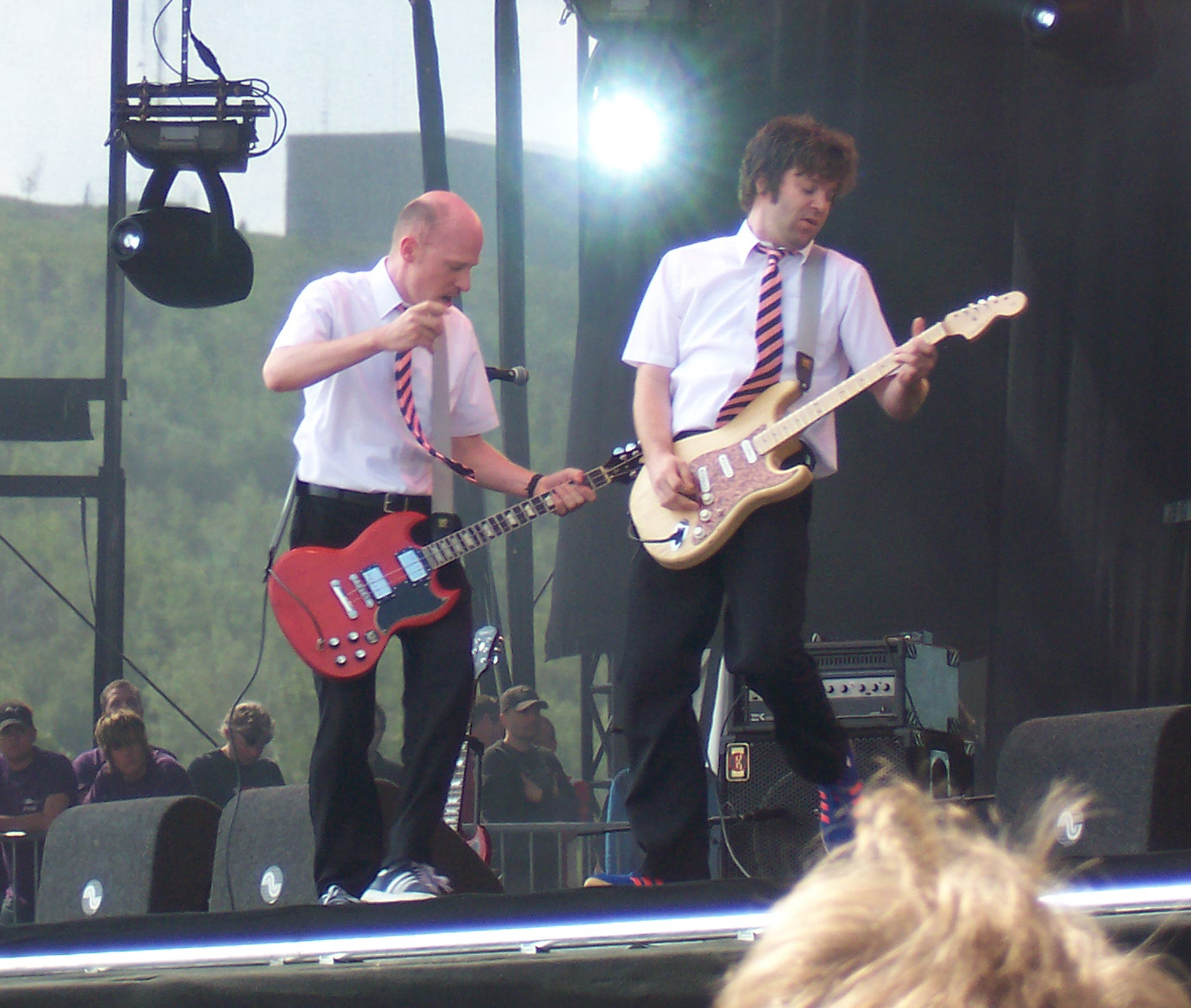
- The Presidents performing in 2005

Background information
- Origin: Seattle, Washington, U.S.
- Genres: Alternative rock; pop-punk; post-grunge
- Works: Discography
- Years active: 1993–1998; 2000; 2003–2015
- Labels: PopLlama; Columbia; SME; Musicblitz; PUSA Inc.; Fugitive; Tooth & Nail
- Past members: Chris Ballew; Jason Finn; Andrew McKeag; Dave Dederer
- Website: presidentsrock.com

The Presidents of the United States of America (occasionally referred to as PUSA, PotUSA, the Presidents of the USA, or simply the Presidents) were an American rock band formed in Seattle, Washington, in 1993. The three-piece group's initial lineup consisted of vocalist and bassist Chris Ballew, drummer Jason Finn, and guitarist Dave Dederer. The band became popular in the mid-1990s for their hits "Lump" and "Peaches"—released in 1995 and 1996, respectively—which helped their self-titled debut album go triple Platinum.

The group broke up for the first time in late 1997, since Ballew wanted a solo career; they performed a farewell concert early the next year. They reunited in 2002. In 2004, Dederer left the group and was replaced by Andrew McKeag. The Presidents privately disbanded in 2015, making the news public the following year.

== History ==
=== Early years (1993–1994) ===
The band was formed in late 1993 by Chris Ballew (bass guitar and lead vocals) and Dave Dederer (guitar and backup vocals), who met at school in Seattle. Ballew had previously been in a punk-busker band called Egg, who wrote many songs that would later be turned into Presidents songs. Initially a drummerless duo, Ballew and Dederer performed a few shows in 1993 as "the Lo-Fis", "the Dynamic Duo", and "Pure Frosting". Ballew eventually came upon the name "the Presidents of the United States of America". Shortly after, Ballew and Dederer added drummer Jason Finn; the band played their first show as a trio at Seattle's Romper Room in early December 1993. At the time, Finn was also the drummer for Love Battery, who had recently changed record labels from Sub Pop to Atlas Records, an A&M subsidiary.

The Presidents recorded a ten-song cassette, Froggystyle, in early 1994 at Laundry Room Studios, selling it at shows that year.

=== Rise to fame (1994–1998) ===
In 1994, the Presidents signed with the independent Seattle label PopLlama Records and released their self-titled debut the following year. They also issued a limited-edition blue vinyl 7" single, "Fuck California", on C/Z Records. Columbia signed the band shortly thereafter and re-released the album in late July 1995. Driven by the singles "Lump", "Peaches", and "Kitty", the record was eventually certified triple Platinum by the RIAA.

A follow-up album, II, received similar praise but did not match the commercial success that its predecessor had, though it was still certified Gold in the US.

From 1995 to 1997, the Presidents toured worldwide to support their first two albums. In 1996, MTV aired a previously recorded live concert from Mount Rushmore for Presidents Day. The band was introduced with: "Ladies and gentlemen, the Presidents of the United States". In addition to relentless touring in the U.S. and Canada, the Presidents made multiple tours of Europe, Australia, New Zealand, and Japan. They were featured in major print media and on radio and TV, including multiple appearances on The Tonight Show with Jay Leno and the Late Show with David Letterman. The Presidents turned down an offer to perform on Saturday Night Live in the fall of 1995, because the date conflicted with Ballew's wedding, but later made an appearance on the eleventh episode of Mad TV in January 1996. They began the program with a skit called "Public Domain", performed "Lump" later in the show, and "When the Saints Go Marching In" during the end credits.

=== Pure Frosting, collaborations, and breakup (1998–2000) ===
The Presidents broke up in January 1998, as Ballew wanted to spend more time with his young family and explore other musical terrain. Pure Frosting, a final album composed of new songs, covers, and demos, was released in 1998. The CD also contained videos for "Lump", "Peaches", "Mach 5", and "Dune Buggy".

Pure Frosting featured two songs that had previously been used in a movie and as a television show theme. "Video Killed the Radio Star" was included on the soundtrack for The Wedding Singer, while "Cleveland Rocks", originally recorded by Ian Hunter, was chosen as the theme song for The Drew Carey Show. Another song on the album, "Man (Opposable Thumb)", appeared in the Nickelodeon-produced motion picture Good Burger but was not directly written or performed for the film.

The Presidents also wrote the theme song for the 1998 TV movie My Date with the President's Daughter. They also performed a cover of the George of the Jungle theme song for the 1997 film adaptation. This performance is not available on any of their albums.

In 1998, the group appeared on the album Happy Hour by Japanese female rockers Shonen Knife, singing backing vocals on the song "Sushi Bar".

Between 1999 and 2000, the Presidents collaborated with Sir Mix-a-Lot as Subset, a short-lived rock and hip-hop band. They had a brief tour and recorded several songs but never released an album.

=== Brief reformation and breakup (2000–2003) ===
The Presidents reunited in 2000 to release a new single, "Jupiter", on MUSICBLITZ Records. Because of the single's popularity, the label convinced the band to release a new album; Freaked Out & Small was issued that year to critical praise. The band did not tour or promote the album, which quietly sold 25,000 copies as MUSICBLITZ, an early digital music player, quickly went bankrupt.

Afterward, members of the Presidents once again went their separate ways. Ballew collaborated with Tad Hutchison of the Young Fresh Fellows as the Chris and Tad Show. Also during this time, the Young Fresh Fellows recorded a song, "Good Times Rock 'N' Roll", about the Presidents, which appeared on the 2001 album Because We Hate You.

=== Full reformation and new guitarist (2003–2010) ===
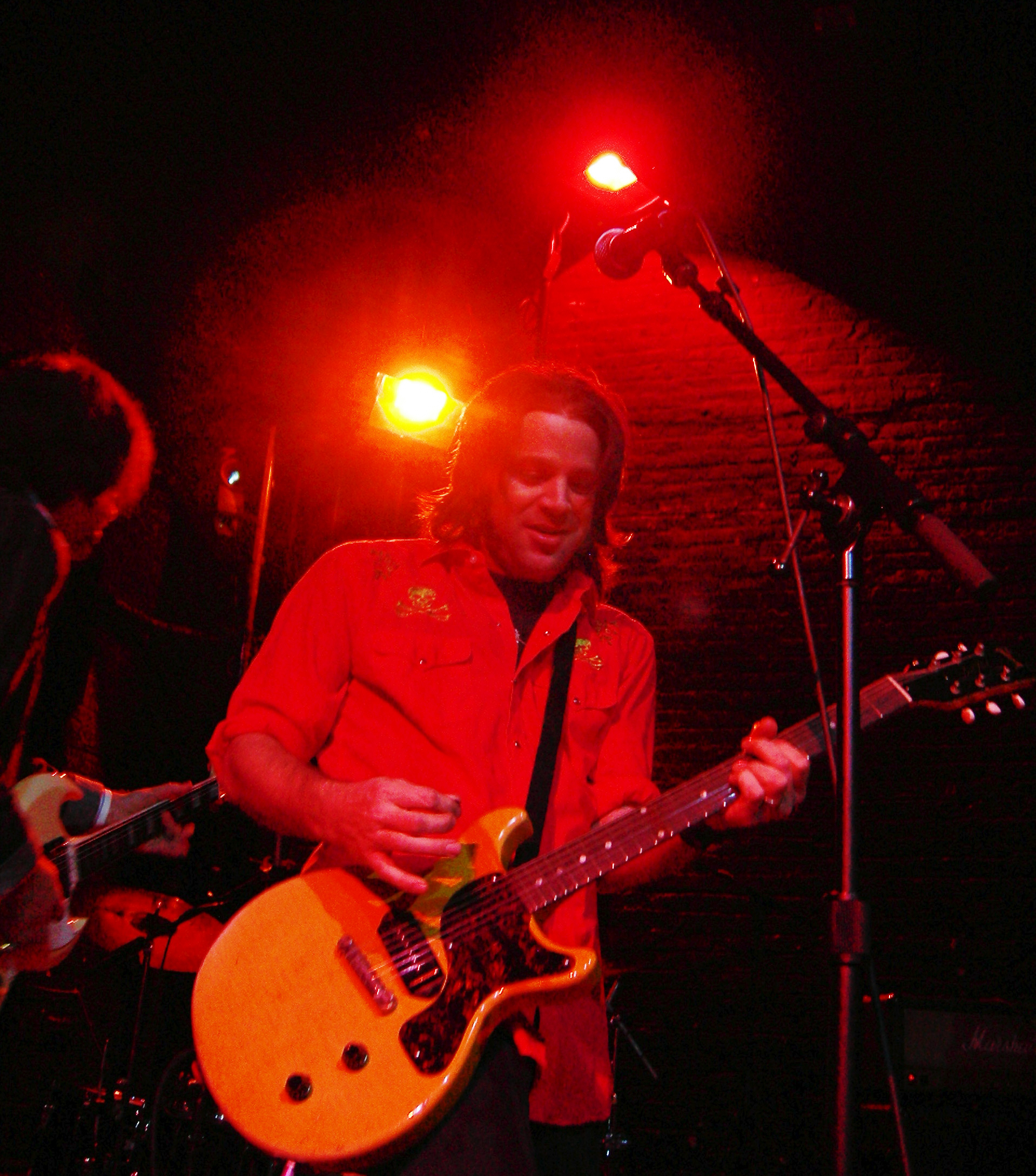
Andrew McKeag in 2007

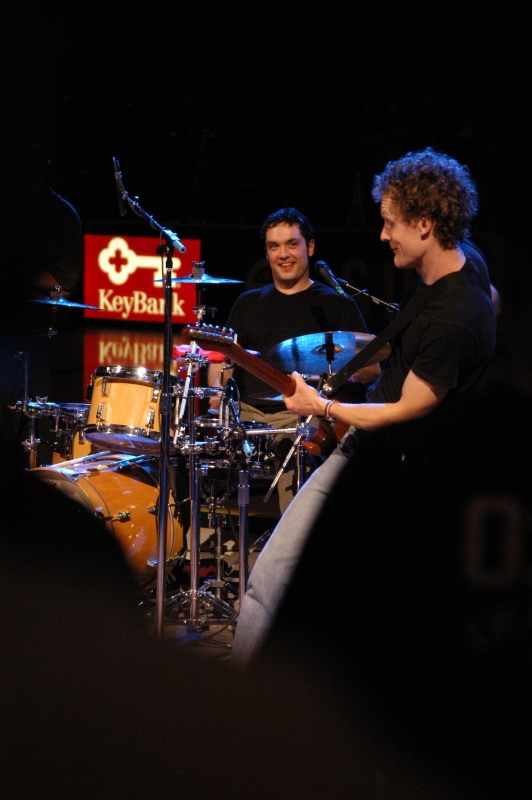
The Presidents in 2005

In 2003, the Presidents once again reformed. In August 2004, they issued Love Everybody on their newly formed indie label, PUSA Inc. Two singles were released through the iTunes Store. In late 2004, the rights to the band's debut album were returned to them, and they have since reissued it through PUSA Inc. twice: once as a tenth-anniversary edition with extra tracks, and again in the spring of 2006 in a low-price edition.

Seattle guitarist Andrew McKeag joined the Presidents in late 2004 as an occasional live-performance stand-in for Dederer, who had expressed an interest in spending more time with his family. In late 2007, McKeag started touring full-time with the band and later replaced Dederer.

In November 2007, the band's next album, These Are the Good Times People, was announced; it was released on March 11, 2008. They performed a live webcast celebrating the album's release by Easy Street Records. In December 2007, KEXP played the new song "Bad Times". On February 1, 2008, 107.7 the End, a Seattle radio station, played "Mixed Up S.O.B.", the first single from the record; The music video for the song was directed by "Weird Al" Yankovic. On June 15, 2008, the Presidents played for Pet-Aid 2008 in Oregon.

In October 2008, "Lump" was released on the video game Rock Band 2. "Ladybug", "Feather Pluck'n", and "Dune Buggy" were issued as downloadable content for the game on November 4, 2008.

=== Final years (2010–2015) ===
On March 5, 2011, the Presidents performed a new tribute song, "Can't Stop (Catchin' 'Em All)", at the Nintendo World launch event for the video game Pokémon Black and White.

In 2012, Columbia re-released Lump, a discount greatest-hits compilation.

In November 2013, the band started a PledgeMusic project in order to release a new studio album. They met their goal in just over a week, and the album, titled Kudos to You!, was released on February 14, 2014. The band also released their first full live album, Thanks for the Feedback, at the same time. Since the beginning of the project, fans were able to pledge for various items in addition to the digital and physical copies of the two albums, such as posters, lyric sheets, and instruments signed by the band. A limited-edition burgundy and yellow vinyl was also available to backers.

On November 16, 2016, Ballew stated that the band had dissolved sometime in the summer of 2015, as they wanted to move on, calling themselves "old people now".

=== Post-2016: Solo work, vinyl re-release ===
Following the breakup, each band member devoted time to his own solo projects. Ballew was the most prolific of the three, releasing albums with the Giraffes and the Tycoons, two of his side projects. Dederer collaborated with former Guns N' Roses bassist Duff McKagan as the Gentlemen and in McKagan's perennial hard rock band Loaded, contributing to the 2001 album Dark Days. Finn played drums for several bands, including Nevada Bachelors, Fastbacks, and Love Battery, his original band.

In 2009, Ballew began recording and performing as children's artist Caspar Babypants and has since released numerous albums under that moniker.

In 2020, the band used Kickstarter to reissue their debut album on green vinyl for the 25th anniversary of its original release. Different pledge tier levels were available that provided extras such as the ability to get the LP signed, anniversary t-shirts, enamel pins, etc.

On December 6, 2022, the band announced a limited-edition vinyl reissue of their demo tape Froggystyle. On February 24, 2023, it was released on streaming services such as Spotify and Apple Music.

== Musical style ==
The Presidents of the United States of America have been most frequently described as alternative rock and pop-punk. Their musical style has also been called post-grunge. Although they have often been labeled as grunge by the media, The New York Times, at the time of their debut in 1995, considered them "an antidote to the misery and self-absorption of grunge". The Washington Post claimed that the band, "without a hint of angst", "have revived the pleasures of pure pop".

The band used unusual instruments: Ballew's basitar and Dederer's guitbass. Both were regular guitars, but the basitar had only two strings (both heavy-gauge) and was played through a bass amplifier, and the guitbass had three strings that Dederer played "like a bass" through a guitar amplifier. Both instruments were tuned to an open C♯5 chord. "A lot of time we just play the exact same thing", Ballew said. "It kind of works. It makes the music really straightforward and satisfying to listen to. We don't get too fancy".

== Legacy ==
On November 6, 2020, three days following the 2020 US presidential election, Ultimate Guitar named the Presidents of the United States of America the 20th "weirdest band name of all time". Senior editor David Slavković wrote: "This is about the right time to mention this band".

== Band members ==
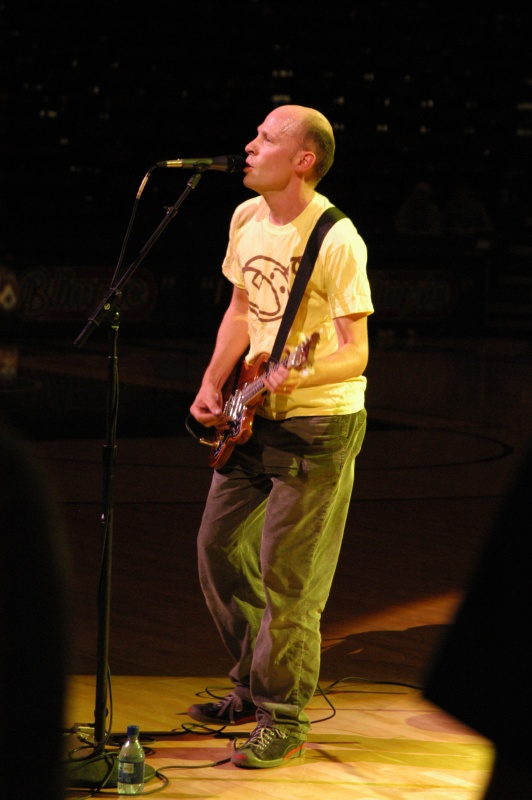
Chris Ballew in 2005

- Chris Ballew – lead vocals, bass (1993–2016)
- Dave Dederer – guitar, backing vocals (1993–2005)
- Jason Finn – drums, backing vocals (1993–2016)
- Andrew McKeag – guitar, backing vocals (2005–2016)

== Discography ==
- The Presidents of the United States of America (1995)
- II (1996)
- Freaked Out and Small (2000)
- Love Everybody (2004)
- These Are the Good Times People (2008)
- Kudos to You! (2014)
