= List of top 25 singles for 1995 in Australia =

Top 25 singles of 1995 < 1994 1996 >

Other Australian top charts for 1995
- top 25 albums
- Triple J Hottest 100

Australian number-one charts of 1995
- albums
- singles

The following lists the top 100 singles of 1995 in Australia from the Australian Recording Industry Association (ARIA) End of Year Singles Chart.

#	Title	Artist	Highest pos. reached	Weeks at No. 1
1.	"Gangsta's Paradise"	Coolio	1	11
2.	"Stayin' Alive"	N-Trance	1	1
3.	"Kiss from a Rose"	Seal	1	6
4.	"Mouth"	Merril Bainbridge	1	6
5.	"Another Night"	M.C. Sar & The Real McCoy	1	6
6.	"Have You Ever Really Loved a Woman"	Bryan Adams	1	1
7.	"Zombie"	The Cranberries	1	7 (Note: "Zombie" entered the charts in November, 1994 and reached No. 1 in December 1994 where it remained until February 1995. It remained in the charts until April, 1995.)
8.	"Let's Groove"	CDB	2	—N/a
9.	"Back for Good"	Take That	1	2
10.	"You Are Not Alone"	Michael Jackson	7	—N/a
11.	"Think Twice"	Celine Dion	2	—N/a
12.	"Insensitive"	Jann Arden	1	1
13.	"Boom Boom Boom"	The Outhere Brothers	2	—N/a
14.	"Here's Johnny"	Hocus Pocus	1	6
15.	"Alice, Who the Fuck Is Alice"	The Steppers	2	—N/a
16.	"Waterfalls"	TLC	4	—N/a
17.	"Total Eclipse of the Heart"	Nicki French	2	—N/a
18.	"Fantasy"	Mariah Carey	1	1
19.	"Tomorrow"	Silverchair	1	6 (Note: "Tomorrow" entered the charts in October, 1994 and reached No. 1 at the end of that month remaining in the #1 spot until the beginning of December 1994.. It remained in the charts for a total of 28 weeks, until April, 1995.)
20.	"You Oughta Know"	Alanis Morissette	4	—N/a
21.	"Sukiyaki"	4 P.M.	3	—N/a
22.	"Here Comes the Hotstepper"	Ini Kamoze	2	—N/a
23.	"Mysterious Girl"	Peter Andre	8	—N/a
24.	"Under the Water"	Merril Bainbridge	4	—N/a
25.	"Shy Guy"	Diana King	3	—N/a
26.	"Strong Enough"	Sheryl Crow	3	—N/a
27.	"You Belong to Me"	JX	4	—N/a
28.	"Stay Another Day"	East 17	3	—N/a
29.	"Hold Me, Thrill Me, Kiss Me, Kill Me"	U2	1	6
30.	"Excalibur"	F.C.B.	2	—N/a
31.	"Pure Massacre"	Silverchair	2	—N/a
32.	"One Sweet Day"	Mariah Carey with Boyz II Men	2	—N/a
33.	"Don't Stop (Wiggle Wiggle)"	The Outhere Brothers	5	—N/a
34.	"Cotton Eye Joe"	Rednex	8	—N/a
35.	"Self Esteem"	The Offspring	6	—N/a
36.	"Run Away"	M.C. Sar & The Real McCoy	4	—N/a
37.	"Runaway"	Janet Jackson	8	—N/a
38.	"Scatman (Ski-Ba-Bop-Ba-Dop-Bop)"	Scatman John	8	—N/a
39.	"Set You Free"	N-Trance	11	—N/a
40.	"When I Come Around"	Green Day	7	—N/a
41.	"Where the Wild Roses Grow"	Nick Cave and Kylie Minogue	2	—N/a
42.	"It's Alright"	Deni Hines	4	—N/a
43.	"Right Type of Mood"	Herbie	10	—N/a
44.	"Baby Baby"	Corona	7	—N/a
45.	"Beautiful in My Eyes"	Joshua Kadison	5	—N/a
46.	"As I Lay Me Down"	Sophie B. Hawkins	7	—N/a
47.	"Scream/Childhood"	Michael Jackson	2	—N/a
48.	"Let Her Cry"	Hootie & the Blowfish	4	—N/a
49.	"Somebody's Crying"	Chris Isaak	5	—N/a
50.	"I've Got a Little Something for You"	MN8	7	—N/a
51.	"Hot Hot Hot" (Remix)	Arrow	9	—N/a
52.	"Love & Devotion"	Real McCoy	7	—N/a
53.	"Everybody on the Floor (Pump It)"	Tokyo Ghetto Pussy	6	—N/a
54.	"I Can Love You Like That"	All-4-One	12	—N/a
55.	"Always"	Bon Jovi	2	—N/a
56.	"A Girl Like You"	Edwyn Collins	6	—N/a
57.	"This Ain't a Love Song"	Bon Jovi	4	—N/a
58.	"I Kiss Your Lips"	Tokyo Ghetto Pussy	8	—N/a
59.	"This Is How We Do It"	Montell Jordan	7	—N/a
60.	"If You Love Me"	Brownstone	13	—N/a
61.	"Come Out and Play"	The Offspring	8	—N/a
62.	"Come Back"	Londonbeat	14	—N/a
63.	"Try Me Out"	Corona	10	—N/a
64.	"I'm Jealous"	Divinyls	14	—N/a
65.	"Sorrento Moon (I Remember)"	Tina Arena	7	—N/a
66.	"Wasn't It Good"	Tina Arena	11	—N/a
67.	"Short Dick Man"	20 Fingers feat. Gillette	4	—N/a
68.	"Party"	Christine Anu	20	—N/a
69.	"Fairground"	Simply Red	7	—N/a
70.	"U Sure Do"	Strike	9	—N/a
71.	"Forever Young"	Interactive	15	—N/a
72.	"Lightning Crashes"	Live	13	—N/a
73.	"Turn the Beat Around"	Gloria Estefan	8	—N/a
74.	"Chains"	Tina Arena	4	—N/a
75.	"Colors of the Wind"	Vanessa Williams	16	—N/a
76.	"Morning Glory"	Oasis	25	—N/a
77.	"Sunshine After the Rain"	Berri	12	—N/a
78.	"All I Wanna Do"	Sheryl Crow	1	1
79.	"On Bended Knee"	Boyz II Men	7	—N/a
80.	"The Bomb! (These Sounds Fall into My Mind)"	Bucketheads	11	—N/a
81.	"Sky High"	Newton	8	—N/a
82.	"Don't Give Me Your Life"	Alex Party	13	—N/a
83.	"I'd Lie for You (And That's the Truth)"	Meat Loaf	7	—N/a
84.	"Never Forget"	Take That	12	—N/a
85.	"Creep"	TLC	20	—N/a
86.	"Come and Get Your Love"	Real McCoy	18	—N/a
87.	"You'll See"	Madonna	9	—N/a
88.	"I Wanna Be a Hippy"	Greater Than One	20	—N/a
89.	"I Wanna Be Down"	Brandy	12	—N/a
90.	"Miss Sarajevo"	Passengers	7	—N/a
91.	"Bedtime Story"	Madonna	5	—N/a
92.	"Put Yourself in My Place"	Kylie Minogue	11	—N/a
93.	"Ode to My Family"	The Cranberries	5	—N/a
94.	"Joy to the World"	Mariah Carey	33	—N/a
95.	"This Is a Call"	Foo Fighters	9	—N/a
96.	"Can I Touch You...There?"	Michael Bolton	18	—N/a
97.	"How Deep Is Your Love"	Portrait	15	—N/a
98.	"Somethin' 4 da Honeyz"	Montell Jordan	19	—N/a
99.	"No More "I Love You's""	Annie Lennox	16	—N/a
100.	"Heaven for Everyone"	Queen	15	—N/a

Peak chart positions from 1995 are from the ARIA Charts, overall position on the End of Year Chart is calculated by ARIA based on the number of weeks and position that the song reached within the Top 50 singles for each week during 1995.
