= Ooh Boy =

1977 single by Rose Royce

Single by Rose Royce

from the album In Full Bloom
- B-side: "You Can't Please Everybody"
- Released: 1977
- Length: 4:15
- Label: Whitfield
- Songwriter: Norman Whitfield
- Producer: Norman Whitfield

Rose Royce singles chronology
"Do Your Dance (Part 1)" (1977)	"Ooh Boy" (1977)	"Wishing on a Star" (1978)

"Ooh Boy" (sometimes known as "Ooh Boy (I Love You So)") is a song written by Norman Whitfield and originally recorded by American soul and R&B group Rose Royce for their second album, In Full Bloom (1977). It was released in 1977 as the third single from the album by Whitfield Records.

== Track listing ==
- Vinyl/7" single

A: "Ooh Boy" – 4:15
B: "You Can't Please Everybody" – 3:47

== Charts ==
Chart (1977)	Peak position
Canada Top Singles (RPM)	35
UK Singles (OCC)	46
US Billboard Hot 100	72
US Hot Black Singles (Billboard)	3

== Real McCoy version ==
"Sleeping With An Angel / Ooh Boy"

Single by Real McCoy

from the album Another Night
- B-side: "Love & Devotion (remix)"
- Released: 1995
- Genre: Eurodance; downtempo
- Label: Arista; BMG (07822-12983-1)
- Producers: Douglas Carr; Per Adebratt; Tommy Ekman; David Brunner; Billy Steinberg; Rick Nowels

Real McCoy singles chronology
"Come and Get Your Love" (1995)	"Sleeping With An Angel / Ooh Boy" (1995)	"One More Time" (1997)

In 1995, German Eurodance project Real McCoy released a double A-sided single of "Sleeping with an Angel/Ooh Boy". It was released by Arista and BMG as the fifth and final single from their debut album, Another Night (1995). The single peaked at number 31 in Iceland and number 19 on the US Billboard Hot Dance Club Play chart. "Ooh Boy" was produced by Douglas Carr, Per Adebratt and Tommy Ekman, while "Sleeping with an Angel" was produced by Billy Steinberg and Rick Nowels.

=== Critical reception ===
In his review of "Sleeping with an Angel", Larry Flick from Billboard magazine wrote, "Here is a total change of pace from the act's previous Euro-NRG hits. Cruising at a chilled pop/hip hop pace, the track's instrumental arrangement combines delicate piano lines with a rubbery bassline and diamond-hard beat. The vocals are also an exercise in contrast, as mournful rapping is surrounded by dreamy, harmonic vocals at the chorus. Single has a wintery vibe that will likely play well with the act's fans at top 40 and crossover formats."

Dave Sholin from the Gavin Report said about "Ooh Boy": "The Class of '96 were babies when Rose Royce charted with this song in 1978. The Real McCoy works their magic and makes it fresh again. Uptempo and definitely radio friendly." Rachel Cohen from The Heights described it as "a fusion of techno with an almost pop rock, Paula Abdul sound. It takes the well used line, 'Ooh Boy I love you so, never ever gonna let you go, once I get my hands on you', and puts it in a brand new context, and the novel creation works well." People Magazine wrote that "group leader Olaf Jeglitza broods like a rapping cowpoke stuck in a tacky rhinestone-studded suit" on "Sleeping With An Angel". Mark Frith from Smash Hits described "Ooh Boy" as "sugary pop".

=== Track listing ===
- CD single
1. "Sleeping with an Angel" (Album Version) – 4:26
2. "Ooh Boy" (Extended Single Version) – 4:47
3. "Ooh Boy" (Uno Clio Extended Remix) – 7:44
4. "Ooh Boy" (Armand's South Of The Border Mix) – 7:02
5. "Love & Devotion" (Development Corp. Mix) – 5:42
- Cassette single

A: "Sleeping With An Angel" – 4:26
B1: "Ooh Boy" (Album Version) – 3:04
B2: "Ooh Boy" (Uno Clio Remix) – 3:56

=== Charts ===
Chart (1995–1996)	Peak position
Iceland (Íslenski Listinn Topp 40)	31
US Billboard Hot 100	101
US Hot Dance Club Play (Billboard)	19

=== Other cover versions ===
- In 1978, Althea & Donna covered "Ooh Boy" and titled it "Oh Dread" for their album Uptown Top Ranking.
- In 1991, Lou-C. covered "Ooh Boy" for her CD album (Maxi-single) in Germany.
- In 2001, Regina Belle covered "Ooh Boy" for her album This Is Regina!.
- In 2004, Marcia Hines covered "Ooh Boy" for her album Hinesight.

=== Samples ===
- "Knockin' Boots" (by Candyman) from the 1990 album Ain't No Shame in My Game
- "Love You So" (by Mase) from his 1997 album Harlem World
- "Luv Me, Luv Me" (by Shaggy and Janet Jackson) from the 1997 album How Stella Got Her Groove Back
- "Luv Me, Luv Me" (by Shaggy and Samantha Cole) from the 2001 album Hot Shot
- "Ooh Girl" (by Blackstreet) from their 2003 album Level II
- "I Love You" (by Cazwell) from his 2019 single
- In 2020, The Skivvies used the chorus in their cover of "Damn It, Janet" as part of the album The Rocky Horror Skivvies Show.
