= One More Time (Real McCoy song) =

1997 single by Real McCoy

Single by Real McCoy

from the album One More Time
- Released: January 1997
- Genre: Eurodisco; Euro-NRG
- Length: 3:51
- Label: Hansa; BMG
- Songwriters: Olaf Jeglitza; J. Wind; Brent Argovitz
- Producers: J. Wind; O-Jay

Real McCoy singles chronology
"Sleeping with an Angel/Ooh Boy" (1995)	"One More Time" (1997)	"I Wanna Come (With You)" (1997)

Music video
- "One More Time" on YouTube

"One More Time" is a song by German Eurodance and pop music project Real McCoy, released in January 1997 by Hansa Records and BMG as the lead single from the project's second album, One More Time (1997). Written by group member Olaf Jeglitza with J. Wind and Brent Argovitz, the song was a top-five hit in Australia, where it peaked at number three and was certified platinum. The single also reached number one on the Canadian RPM Dance chart and number 14 on the US Billboard Dance Club Play chart. The accompanying music video was directed by Paul Boyd and filmed in the United States.

== Critical reception ==
Larry Flick from Billboard magazine wrote, "It's been two years since Real McCoy helped turn the tide for dance music at pop radio with 'Another Night', 'Runaway', and 'Come and Get Your Love'. And while there are dozens of competent, similar-sounding acts vying for attention, there's truly nothing like the real thing—as proved by this giddy preview into the group's forthcoming sophomore release. The beats race with Euro-NRG verve, and the chorus is downright unshakable. The combination of chorus-chirping and verse-rapping continues to work extremely well." Diana Valois from The Morning Call described it as "typical pumped-up Eurodisco. Bright and irresistible, it ends with O-J begging, "Do it just one more time ..."." Chuck Campbell from Scripps Howard News Service said the band "revives its slap-happy energy" on the track.

== Chart performance ==
In Canada, "One More Time" peaked at number one on the RPM Dance chart and number eight on the Canadian Singles Chart. The single was successful also in Australia, where it reached number three, making it the second-most successful song by the band there, after "Another Night". In the United States, it peaked at number 14 on the Billboard Dance Club Play chart and number 27 on the Billboard Hot 100. In Latin America, it became a top-10 hit in Mexico, peaking at number four. In Europe, "One More Time" peaked within the top 30 in Iceland, reaching number 25. It also charted in Germany, reaching number 85. The single was awarded with a platinum record in Australia, with shipments of 70,000 units.

== Music video ==
The music video for "One More Time" was shot in 1997 and directed by Scottish director Paul Boyd. It was filmed in Los Angeles, the US and produced by Propaganda Films, featuring the band performing the song onstage in a night club. In between the performance, frontman Olaf Jeglitza photographs kissing clubgoers at different places in the club, as well as females posing in a green-light-covered passageway. The video was later made available on Real McCoy's official YouTube channel in 2009, having generated more than 9.5 million views as of early 2026.

== Track listings ==
- CD maxi (Germany)
1. "One More Time" (Original Radio Mix) – 3:51
2. "One More Time" (Club Attack Mix II) – 6:50
3. "One More Time" (Bass Bumpers Mix) – 5:38
4. "One More Time" (UK Radio Mix) – 5:05
- CD maxi – Remixed (Germany)
1. "One More Time" (Sequential One Remix) – 5:00
2. "One More Time" (Johnny "Vicious" Dub) – 8:47
3. "One More Time" (Mox Epoque's Mad Mix) – 7:16
4. "One More Time" (Jay Ray Remix) – 6:00
5. "One More Time" (Dub Mix) – 5:51
6. "One More Time" (Mox Epoque's Lazy Dub) – 6:21
- CD maxi – The Remixes (US)
1. "One More Time" (Tony Moran Extended Mix) – 7:49
2. "One More Time" (Berman Brothers Club Mix) – 6:50
3. "One More Time" (Bass Bumper Mix) – 5:38
4. "One More Time" (Johnny "Vicious" Dub) – 8:47
5. "One More Time" (Berman Brothers Dub) – 5:50
- CD maxi – The Remixes (UK)
1. "One More Time" (US 7" Version) – 3:59
2. "One More Time" (Tony Moran Extended Mix) – 7:49
3. "One More Time" (Bass Bumpers Mix) – 5:38
4. "One More Time" (Sequential One Mix) – 5:00
5. "One More Time" (Club Attack Mix II) – 6:50
6. "One More Time" (Jay Ray Remix 1) – 6:00

== Charts ==
=== Weekly charts ===
Chart (1997)	Peak position
Australia (ARIA)	3
Canada (Nielsen SoundScan)	8
Canada Dance/Urban (RPM)	1
Germany (GfK)	85
Iceland (Íslenski Listinn Topp 40)	25
Mexico (Notitas Musicales)	4
Scottish Singles Sales (Official Charts)	74
UK Singles (Official Charts)	78
US Billboard Hot 100	27
US Dance Club Play (Billboard)	14
US Maxi-Singles Sales (Billboard)	6
US Top 40/Mainstream (Billboard)	18
US Top 40/Rhythm-Crossover (Billboard)	22

=== Year-end charts ===
Chart (1997)	Position
Australia (ARIA)	29
Canada Dance/Urban (RPM)	10
US Billboard Hot 100	90
US Maxi-Singles Sales (Billboard)	38
US Rhythmic Top 40 (Billboard)	99
US Top 40/Mainstream (Billboard)	84

== Certification ==
Region	Certification	Certified units/sales
Australia (ARIA)	Platinum	70,000^{^}
^{^} Shipments figures based on certification alone.

== Release history ==
Region	Date	Format(s)	Label(s)	Ref.
Europe	January 1997	—N/a	Hansa; BMG	
Japan	21 February 1997	CD	Hansa; BMG	
United States	25 February 1997	Rhythmic contemporary; contemporary hit radio	Arista; Hansa; BMG	
United Kingdom	8 September 1997	CD; cassette	Arista; Hansa; BMG	
