= Another Night =

Another Night may refer to:

- Another Night (Real McCoy album), a 1995 album by Real McCoy
  - "Another Night" (song), the title song of that album
- Another Night (The Hollies album), a 1975 album by The Hollies
- "Se på mej", a song by the Swedish singer Jan Johansen, recorded in English as "Another Night"
- "Another Night", 1986 single by Aretha Franklin from the album Who's Zoomin' Who?
- "Another Night", 1990 single by Jason Donovan from the album Between the Lines
- "Another Night", 1976 song from the Camel album Moonmadness
- "Another Night", 1982 song from the Bucks Fizz album Are You Ready
- "Another Night", 2010 song from the Mac Miller EP, On and On and Beyond
