= Knockin' Boots =

Knockin' Boots may refer to:

- "Knockin' Boots" (Candyman song)
- "Knockin' Boots" (Luke Bryan song)

== See also ==
- Knockin' Boots 2001: A Sex Odyssey, a 2001 album by Candyman
- "Knockin' Da Boots", a 1993 song by H-Town
