= Automatic Lover (Call for Love) =

1994 single by Real McCoy

"Automatic Lover (Call For Love)"
- Original European cover

Single by Real McCoy

from the album Another Night
- Released: 31 January 1994
- Genre: Eurodance; dance-pop
- Length: 3:47
- Label: Hansa
- Songwriters: Jürgen Wind; Quickmix; Olaf Jeglitza
- Producers: Freshline; the Berman Brothers

Real McCoy singles chronology
"Another Night" (1993)	"Automatic Lover (Call For Love)" (1994)	"Run Away" (1994)

Music video
- "Automatic Lover (Call For Love)" on YouTube

"Automatic Lover (Call for Love)" is a song by German Eurodance/pop music project Real McCoy (also known as M.C. Sar & The Real McCoy), released in January 1994 by Hansa Records as the second single from their album Another Night (1995), which is the US version of the project's second album, Space Invaders. The song was produced by music producers Juergen Wind (aka J. Wind) and Frank Hassas (aka Quickmix) under the producer team name Freshline, and borrows the melody from Bronski Beat's 1984 song, "Smalltown Boy". It was a top-20 hit in a number of countries, including Australia, Denmark, Germany, Lebanon and Sweden. There are two different versions of the accompanying music video.

== Critical reception ==
Bradley Torreano from AllMusic felt the song was "more club-friendly" and found its audience among the young dance crowds before moving to radio. Larry Flick from Billboard magazine wrote, "Look for this Euro-NRG trio to once again steamroll toward the upper regions of the Hot 100 with this catchy dance/pop ditty. The formula is solidly in place: Throaty Romeo-style male rapping is balanced by charming female vamping during the chorus and underscored with frenetic, butt-shaking beats. The hook is as sticky as they come. A no-brainer hit."

Dave Sholin from the Gavin Report commented, "Tally up the spins that O-Jay, Patsy and Vanessa have logged in the States since the release of 'Another Night' and it's nothing short of staggering. That figure is certain to grow thanks to this high-energy production." Another GR editor, Annette M. Lai, felt it has "hit potential". Howard Cohen from Herald-Journal described the track as "club-ready". Daisy and Havoc from Music Week's RM Dance Update named it a "amusing piece of pop". Another RM editor, James Hamilton, called it a "archetypal gruffy muttered and sweetly cooed Euro romp". People Magazine wrote that songs like this "pack so many beats into 4 minutes that just listening to them is thoroughly exhausting." Mark Frith from Smash Hits described it as "pop techno".

== Chart performance ==
"Automatic Lover" reached number two in Finland and entered the top 20 in Australia, Denmark, Germany, and Sweden. In the United Kingdom, the song peaked at number 58 during its first week on the UK Singles Chart, on 5 November 1995. On the UK Dance Chart, it peaked at number 20, while on the Eurochart Hot 100, it reached number 44 in March 1994. In Canada, the song reached number nine on the RPM Dance chart. In the United States, "Automatic Lover" charted at number 51 on the Cash Box Top 100 and number 52 on the Billboard Hot 100, while on the Billboard Dance Club Play chart, the song peaked at number three.

== Music video ==
There were produced two different music videos for "Automatic Lover (Call for Love)". The European version was directed by Angel Gracia in 1994. The other version was filmed in Queens, New York City in 1995. "Automatic Lover (Call for Love)" was B-listed on German music television channel VIVA in April 1994.

== Track listings ==
- CD single (Hansa – 74321 18487 2)
1. "Automatic Lover (Call for Love)" (Radio Mix) – 3:47
2. "Automatic Lover (Call for Love)" (Extended 12" Mix) – 5:30
3. "Automatic Lover (Call for Love)" (Trans Euro Mix) – 5:27
4. "Automatic Lover (Call for Love)" (Automatic Trance Mix) – 5:47
- The Remixes (Hansa – 74321 20460 2)
1. "Automatic Lover (Call for Love)" (Airplay Remix) – 3:58
2. "Automatic Lover (Call for Love)" (Maximum Mix) – 4:53
3. "Automatic Lover (Call for Love)" (B & B Mix) – 5:48
4. "Automatic Lover (Call for Love)" (Party Rave Mix) – 5:34
5. "Automatic Lover (Call for Love)" (Garage Mix) – 5:40
6. "Automatic Lover (Call for Love)" (Call For Hardcore Mix) – 5:34
- Dutch maxi single (Hansa – 74321 32574 1)
1. "Automatic Lover (Call for Love)" (Lenny's House Mix Edit) – 7:56
2. "Automatic Lover (Call for Love)" (Trans Euro Mix) – 5:27
3. "Automatic Lover (Call for Love)" (Armand's NYC-Miami Mix) – 9:37

== Charts ==
=== Weekly charts ===
Chart (1994–1996)	Peak position
Australia (ARIA)	18
Canada Dance/Urban (RPM)	9
Denmark (IFPI)	14
Europe (Eurochart Hot 100)	44
Finland (Suomen virallinen lista)	2
France (SNEP)	38
Germany (GfK)	20
New Zealand (RIANZ)	44
Scotland (OCC)	59
Sweden (Topplistan)	19
Switzerland (Schweizer Hitparade)	32
UK Singles (OCC)	58
UK Dance (OCC)	20
UK Club Chart (Music Week)	20
US Billboard Hot 100	52
US Dance Club Play (Billboard)	3
US Maxi-Singles Sales (Billboard)	8
US Top 40/Mainstream (Billboard)	35
US Top 40/Rhythm-Crossover (Billboard)	24
US Cash Box Top 100	51

=== Year-end charts ===
Chart (1994)	Position
Germany (Media Control)	92

Chart (1996)	Position
Australia (ARIA)	93

== Release history ==
Region	Date	Format(s)	Label(s)	Ref.
Germany	31 January 1994	12-inch vinyl; CD	Hansa	
United Kingdom	30 October 1995	12-inch vinyl; CD; cassette	Logic; BMG; Hansa	
Australia	27 November 1995	CD; cassette	Arista; BMG; Hansa	
