= Phukk Watcha Goin' Thru =

Studio album by Candyman
- Released: October 10, 1995
- Recorded: 1995
- Genre: Hip Hop; Rap; R&B
- Label: Ruckus Records
- Producer: Candyman

Candyman chronology
I Thought U Knew (1993)	Phukk Watcha Goin' Thru (1995)	Knockin' Boots 2001: A Sex Odyssey (2001)

Phukk Watcha Goin' Thru is the fourth album by rapper, Candyman. The album was released on October 10, 1995 for independent record label Ruckus Records, and was produced by Candyman. The album was yet another critical and commercial failure for Candyman, not only not charting on any album charts nor featuring any hit singles, but barely selling any copies. A sequel to Candyman's only hit single, "Knockin' Boots" appeared on the album entitled "Knockin Boots Pt. 2".

== Track listing ==
1. "Playa Hatas (In This Game)"
2. "Knockin Boots Pt. 2"
3. "Skit 1"
4. "U Gots No Win"
5. "Skit 2"
6. "All Night (And Then Some)"
7. "Skit 3"
8. "Phukk Watcha Goin Thru"
9. Who Shakes the Best"
10. "Skit 4"
11. "All Night (and a Box of Condoms)"
12. "Skit 5"
13. "Dedication"
