= It's On You =

1990 single by MC Sar & the Real McCoy

Single by MC Sar & the Real McCoy

from the album On the Move
- B-side: "Remix"
- Released: 1989
- Genre: Hip house
- Length: 4:00
- Label: ZYX
- Songwriters: Olaf Jeglitza, Juergen Wind (J. Wind), Quiclmix
- Producers: Juergen Wind (J. Wind), Quiclmix

MC Sar & the Real McCoy singles chronology
"Pump Up the Jam" (1989)	"It's On You" (1989)	"Don't Stop" (1990)

"It's On You" is a song released in 1989 by the Germany-based dance project M.C. Sar & the Real McCoy.

== Background ==
"It's On You" was the second single released by M.C. Sar & the Real McCoy under ZYX records. The single debuted in 1989 after the first single, "Pump Up the Jam - Rap" (a cover version of the debut Technotronic hit) had reached No. 16 in Germany in 1989. German producers Juergen Wind (J. Wind) and Frank Hassas (Quickmix) wrote and produced the single while German rapper Olaf Jeglitza provided the rap verses. The single became a top hit in Germany and a success in other European territories in 1989. The single was particularly successful in France where it had earned silver status, selling over 200,000 units. The growing success of both singles motivated ZYX Records to request a live act and a music video for the single. A Frenchman of African descent named George Shampro Mario was hired to be MC Sar and to act as a frontman and rapper in order to give a face to the act. Unbeknownst to the public, Mario was a lip-sync artist who mimed the rap vocals of Jeglitza for the live performances and the music video. During this early phase of the project, Jeglitza was completely anonymous. Singer Patricia Petersen (Patsy) sang the choruses on the single and fronted the project with Mario.

== Track listings ==
CD single

1. "It's On You" (Mix Factory remix) — 6:47
2. "It's On You" (re-remix) — 5:15
3. "It's On You" (7" re-remix) — 3:45

CD maxi

1. "It's On You" (The Ultimate Freshline Allstars remix) — 6:47
2. "It's On You" (radio remix version) — 3:58
3. "It's On You" (original extended mix) — 5:43

CD maxi / 12" maxi

1. "It's On You" (extended mix) — 5:43
2. "It's On You" (quick-house mix) — 4:58
3. "It's On You" (Big Fun mix) — 6:09
4. "It's On You" (a cappella) — 1:58
5. "It's On You" (guitarpella) — 0:37

7" single

1. "It's On You" (single mix) — 4:00
2. "It's On You" (quick-house mix) — 4:58

12" maxi - Remixes

1. "It's On You" (UK remix) — 5:44
2. "It's On You" (re-remix) — 5:15
3. "It's On You" (7" re-remix) — 3:45

== Credits ==
- Vocals by Patricia "Patzy" Peterson
- Backing vocals by Quickmix and Sarah
- Guitar by Jürgen Wind
- Mixed by Freshline Allstars
- Produced by Jay Rapper and Quickmix
- Recorded & mixed at Quadriga Studios / Wind B.C.
- "UK remix" remixed by Adam Fenton and Mick Evans
- "Re-remix" and "7" re-remix" remixed by Mario Aldini

== Charts ==
=== Weekly charts ===
Weekly chart performance for "It's On You"
Chart (1990)	Peak position
Austria (Ö3 Austria Top 40)	4
Belgium (Ultratop 50 Flanders)	6
Europe (Eurochart Hot 100)	10
France (SNEP)	8
Netherlands (Dutch Top 40)	3
Netherlands (Single Top 100)	3
Spain (AFYVE)	1
Switzerland (Schweizer Hitparade)	8
West Germany (GfK)	11

=== Year-end charts ===
Year-end chart performance for "It's On You"
Chart (1990)	Position
Belgium (Ultratop)	48
Europe (Eurochart Hot 100)	42
Germany (Media Control)	46
Netherlands (Dutch Top 40)	31
Netherlands (Single Top 100)	18

== Certifications ==
Certifications for "It's On You"
Region	Certification	Certified units/sales
France (SNEP)	Silver	200,000^{*}
^{*} Sales figures based on certification alone.

== Real McCoy version (1999) ==
"It's On You"

Single by Real McCoy
- Released: 1999
- Genre: House
- Length: 3:35
- Label: Hansa, BMG
- Songwriters: J. Wind, Quickmix. Olaf Jeglitza
- Producers: J. Wind, Quickmix

Real McCoy singles chronology
"Pump Up The Jam 98" (1998)	"It's On You" (1999)	"Hey Now" (2000)

"It's On You" was re-recorded by Real McCoy in 1999 as an updated version of the project's original 1990 hit. This version has minor edits to its rap lyrics, and the female vocals were completely re-recorded by singers Ginger and Gabrielle, and the raps were re-recorded with Olaf Jeglitza. A new music video was filmed in a beach/waterfront-like setting and featured rapper Jason Ammon in the video with a cameo appearance by Jeglitza.

=== Track listings ===
CD maxi - 1999 version

1. "It's On You" (Radio Edit) — 3:33
2. "It's On You" (Bonbon Boys Radio Edit) — 3:52
3. "It's On You" (Extended Mix) — 5:25
4. "It's On You" (Blue Nature Mix) — 5:10
5. "It's On You" (Bonbon Boys Mix) — 6:04
6. "It's On You" (Bbasslab Remix) — 5:26
7. "It's On You" (The Funk Dominator N.Y. Edit) — 5:20

=== Credits ===
- Olaf "O-Jay" Jeglitza - lead vocal/producer
- Ginger Kamphuis - performer
- Gabriele "Geby" Koopmans - vocal
- Jason Ammon - male vocal

=== Charts ===
Chart (1999)	Peak Position
Canada (RPM)	14
