= Playtime's Over (album) =

Studio album by Candyman
- Released: July 17, 1991
- Recorded: 1990–1991
- Genre: Hip hop Rap; R&B
- Length: 48:59
- Label: Epic, Sony
- Producer: Candyman, DJ Scratch, Roger Troutman

Candyman chronology
Ain't No Shame in My Game (1990)	Playtime's Over (1991)	I Thought U Knew (1993)

Professional ratings
Review scores
Source	Rating
AllMusic	3/5 stars

Playtime's Over is the second album by American rapper Candyman. It was released in July 1991 for Epic Records and was produced by Candyman and DJ Scratch. Coming off the success of his previous album Ain't No Shame in My Game, Playtime's Over failed to reach any Billboard charts. It featured only one charting single, "Oneighundredskytalkpinelevenotwosevenine" (1-800-Sky-Talk PIN #110279), which made it to number 13 on the Hot Rap Singles. It was the last time anything by Candyman made it to the Billboard charts.

== Track listing ==
1. "Round 2"
2. "Sho Feels Good"
3. "I Wanna Luv You"
4. "Oneighundredskytalkpinelevenotwosevenine"
5. "Everybody Wanna Be a Rappa"
6. "Tastee"
7. "Who Shakes the Best, Pt. 2"
8. "Another Hiney"
9. "Sex on the Beach"
10. "Playtime's Over"
11. "I'm Done!"
