= One More Time (Real McCoy album) =

Studio album by Real McCoy
- Released: March 25, 1997 (US)
- Recorded: 1996–1997
- Length: 46:06
- Label: Arista, BMG
- Producer: Juergen Wind (J.Wind); Per Adebratt; Douglas Carr; Tony Ekman; Berman Brothers

Real McCoy chronology
Another Night (1995)	One More Time (1997)

Singles from One More Time
- 1. "One More Time" Released: 1997; 2. "I Wanna Come (With You)" Released: 1997; 3. "(If You're Not in it for Love) I'm Outta Here" Released: 1997

One More Time is the fourth studio album by German Eurodance group Real McCoy. This was the second album from the group to be released under Arista Records and the third under BMG Berlin. It was the follow-up to the multi-platinum selling album Another Night. Music producer Juergen Wind (J. Wind) wrote and produced the album with the Sweden based production team known as Lemon Productions (Per Adebratt, Douglas Carr & Tony Ekman). American songwriter Brent Argovitz and German rapper Olaf Jeglitza worked together as songwriters on the album. A producer duo known as the Berman Brothers also produced a Shania Twain cover for the album and made the remixes for the singles. For promotional reasons, Jeglitza was credited as an Executive Producer alongside Wind and Arista Records CEO Clive Davis. Released worldwide in early 1997, the album failed to match the success of its predecessor, peaking at No. 55 on the Canadian Hot 100 and No. 79 on the US Billboard 200. The lead single from the album, (also called "One More Time"), reached No.3 in Australia and achieved Platinum status in the country but saw lesser success in the US, peaking at No. 27 on the charts. The follow-up singles "I Wanna Come (With You)" and the Shania Twain cover "(If You're Not in It for Love) I'm Outta Here!" failed to chart and were also commercial failures.

== Critical reception ==
William Cooper from AllMusic gave the album a negative review, saying; "only the title track, a catchy, lightweight piece of pop fluff, makes any kind of impression. Most of One More Time is empty filler, and a couple of moments are unbearable: the silly "I Wanna Come (With You)" teases with the provocative title but fails to deliver, and the absurd Euro-pop remake of Shania Twain's "If You're Not in It for Love (I'm Outta Here)" is awful, but it isn't even bad enough to be fun. European dance acts rarely have a long shelf life, and this album proves The Real McCoy is no exception. Stick with the debut."

== Track listing ==
=== Standard edition ===
No.	Title	Writer(s)	Length
1.	"One More Time (Original Radio Mix)"	Jürgen Wind, Olaf Jeglitza & Brent Argovitz	3:51
2.	"Give a Little Love"	Jürgen Wind, Olaf Jeglitza & Brent Argovitz	3:32
3.	"The Sky Is The Limit"	Jürgen Wind, Olaf Jeglitza, Brent Argovitz, L. Cork	3:39
4.	"Tomorrow"	Jürgen Wind, Olaf Jeglitza, Brent Argovitz & Vanessa Mason	4:05
5.	"I Wanna Come (With You)"	Jürgen Wind, Olaf Jeglitza, Brent Argovitz & Vanessa Mason	4:02
6.	"Love Almost Faded"	Olaf Jeglitza, Vanessa Mason, Brent Argovitz & A. Kahan	3:24
7.	"Party"	Jürgen Wind, Olaf Jeglitza & Brent Argovitz	3:57
8.	"Take A Look At Your Life"	Jürgen Wind, Olaf Jeglitza & Brent Argovitz	4:08
9.	"Love Save Me"	Billy Steinberg, Rick Nowels & Neil Giraldo	4:07
10.	"Love Is a Stranger"	Jürgen Wind, Olaf Jeglitza & Brent Argovitz	3:38
11.	"Silly"	June Deniece Williams, Clarence McDonald & Fritz Baskett	4:19
12.	"Look at Me"	Jürgen Wind, Olaf Jeglitza, Brent Argovitz, Vanessa Mason & A. Kahan	4:25
13.	"Tonight"	Jürgen Wind, Olaf Jeglitza & L. Cork	3:51
14.	"(If You're Not in it for Love) I'm Outta Here"	Robert Lange & Shania Twain	3:59
15.	"Start Loving Me"	Olaf Jeglitza & Brent Argovitz	3:25

=== US edition ===
1. "One More Time" – 3:59
2. "I Wanna Come (With You)" – 3:25
3. "Give a Little Love" – 3:31
4. "(If You're Not in It for Love) I'm Outta Here" – 3:58
5. "Love Almost Faded" – 3:23
6. "Look at Me" – 4:24
7. "Love Save Me" – 4:08
8. "Take a Look at Your Life" – 4:08
9. "The Sky Is the Limit" – 3:38
10. "Love Is a Stranger" – 3:38
11. "Tomorrow" – 4:05
12. "Tonight" – 3:49
13. CD-ROM multimedia presentation

=== Japanese edition ===
1. "One More Time" (UK radio mix) – 5:08
2. "One More Time" (original radio mix) – 3:49
3. "Give a Little Love" – 3:33
4. "The Sky Is the Limit" – 3:39
5. "Tomorrow" – 4:07
6. "I Wanna Come (With You)" – 4:02
7. "Love Almost Faded" – 3:25
8. "Party" – 3:58
9. "Take a Look at Your Life" – 4:09
10. "Love Save Me" – 4:09
11. "Love Is a Stranger" – 3:40
12. Silly" – 4:20
13. "Look at Me" – 4:27
14. "Tonight" – 3:50
15. "(If You're Not in It for Love) I'm Outta Here!" – 3:56
16. "Start Loving Me" – 3:27
17. "One More Time" (Mox Lazy Dub) – 6:37

== Personnel ==
=== Members ===
- Olaf Jeglitza (O-Jay)
- Vanessa Mason
- Lisa Cork

=== Producers ===
- Juergen Wind (J. Wind) – executive producer
- Berman Brothers
- Per Adebratt, Douglas Carr & Tony Ekman for Lemon Productions

== Charts ==
Chart performance for One More Time
Chart (1997)	Peak position
Australian Albums (ARIA)	78
Canadian Albums Chart	55
US Billboard 200	79
