= Love & Devotion =

1995 single by Real McCoy

Single by Real McCoy

from the album Another Night
- Released: April 1995
- Genre: Eurodance; reggae; disco
- Length: 3:55
- Label: Arista
- Songwriters: Jürgen Wind; Quickmix; Olaf Jeglitza
- Producers: J. Wind; Quickmix; O-Jay

Real McCoy singles chronology
"Run Away" (1994)	"Love & Devotion" (1995)	"Come and Get Your Love" (1995)

Music video
- "Love & Devotion" on YouTube

"Love & Devotion" is a song by the German Eurodance and pop music project Real McCoy (also known as M.C. Sar & the Real McCoy). Originally an album track from their second album, Space Invaders (1994), it was later released in Europe in April 1995 by Arista Records as a Real McCoy single. It was written and produced by J, Wind, Quickmix and Olaf Jeglitza. The single peaked within the top 10 in Australia, Finland, Lithuania and Scotland. Its music video was filmed in London, England, featuring the band performing at locations in the city at night.

== Critical reception ==
AllMusic editor Bryan Buss named "Love & Devotion" a standout track from the Another Night album. James Richliano from The Boston Globe described it as "Spanish-flavoured". Annette M. Lai from the Gavin Report stated that it has "hit potential". Ross Jones from The Guardian named it "pan-cultural disco". British Lennox Herald remarked that the song "has shades of Ace of Base which probably means that it will be a hit." In his weekly UK chart commentary, James Masterton said, "For some reason the more laid-back tempo of 'Love and Devotion' reminds me of the kind of record the DJ would put on at an open air disco in the middle of the continent in summer."

Pan-European magazine Music & Media noted that musically, the Berlin duo "carries on with a reggae-styled Euro dance follow-up" to 'Another Night'. Music Week gave the song a score of four out of five, stating that "moving into Ace of Base Eurofied reggae territory, this is destined for the Top 10". James Hamilton from the Record Mirror Dance Update named it an "Ace of Base-ish catchy Euro-reggae chugger" in his weekly dance column. Gill Whyte from Smash Hits gave it two out of five, writing, "She chirrups away about lurrve, to a pappy reggae backing, then he comes in, all deep-throaty what-your-dad-would-think-was-sexy stylee rapping, and that's about it."

== Chart performance ==
"Love & Devotion" became a top-10 hit in Finland, Lithuania and Scotland, peaking at numbers four, five and 10 respectively. Additionally, it was a top-20 hit in Austria, Flanders, Ireland, Sweden and the United Kingdom, as well as on the Eurochart Hot 100, where it reached number 19 in May 1995. In the UK, it both peaked and debuted at number 11 on the UK Singles Chart, on 23 April 1995. It spent a total of 7 weeks inside the UK Top 100. On the UK Dance Singles Chart, it reached number 14. Elsewhere in Europe, it peaked within the top 30 in the Netherlands and the top 40 in the band's native Germany. Outside Europe, "Love & Devotion" was successful in Australia, peaking at number seven and spending 16 weeks inside the ARIA Top 50 singles chart, while in New Zealand, it was a top-30 hit, reaching number 28. In West Asia, it became a top-30 hit also in Israel, peaking at number 29 on 2 May 1995.

== Music video ==
The accompanying music video for "Love & Devotion" was filmed in London, and depicts different people sitting in a construction of two chairs put together with their backs to each other, that are spinning slowly around. In between, there are scenes featuring the members of the band walking around at locations in the city at night. Sometimes they also performs while sitting in the spinning chairs. MTV Europe put the video on prime break out rotation in June 1995 and it was B-listed on German music television channel VIVA same month. "Love & Devotion" was later made available on Real McCoy's official YouTube channel in 2006, and had generated almost five million views as of late 2025.

== Track listings ==
- CD single (74321 27270–2)
1. "Love & Devotion" (Airplay Mix) – 3:54
2. "Love & Devotion" (Club Mix) – 4:43
3. "Love & Devotion" (Development Corporation Extended) – 5:41
4. "Another Night" (Radio Mix) – 3:57
- CD maxi (74321 26377 2)
1. "Love & Devotion" (Airplay Mix) – 3:55
2. "Love & Devotion" (UK Airplay Mix) – 3:57
3. "Love & Devotion" (Club Mix) – 4:33
4. "Love & Devotion" (Extended UK Mix) – 5:42
5. "Love & Devotion" (Summer Mix) – 5:32
6. "Love & Devotion" (House Mix) – 5:50

== Charts ==
=== Weekly charts ===
Chart (1995)	Peak position
Australia (ARIA)	7
Austria (Ö3 Austria Top 40)	16
Belgium (Ultratop 50 Flanders)	12
Belgium (Ultratop 50 Wallonia)	30
Europe (Eurochart Hot 100)	19
Europe (European Dance Radio)	17
Europe (European Hit Radio)	8
Finland (Suomen virallinen lista)	4
Germany (GfK)	37
Ireland (IRMA)	16
Israel (Israeli Singles Chart)	29
Italy Airplay (Music & Media)	6
Lithuania (M-1)	5
Netherlands (Single Top 100)	26
Netherlands (Dutch Top 40)	24
New Zealand (Recorded Music NZ)	28
Scotland (OCC)	10
Sweden (Sverigetopplistan)	16
UK Singles (Official Charts)	11
UK Dance (OCC)	14
UK Airplay (Music Week)	8
UK Pop Tip Club Chart (Music Week)	9

=== Year-end charts ===
Chart (1995)	Position
Australia (ARIA)	52
Latvia (Latvijas Top 50)	84
