= Nightgown (song) =

1991 single by Candyman

Single by Candyman

from the album Ain't No Shame in My Game
- Released: 1991
- Genre: Hip-hop
- Length: 4:36
- Label: Epic
- Songwriters: John Shaffer III; Prince Nelson; Seth Justman

Candyman singles chronology
"Melt in Your Mouth" (1990)	"Nightgown" (1991)	"Oneighundredskytalkpinelevenotwosevenine" (1992)

Music video
- "Nightgown" on YouTube

"Nightgown" is a song by American rapper Candyman and the third single from his debut studio album Ain't No Shame in My Game (1990). It contains samples of "Head" and "Irresistible Bitch" by Prince.

== Content ==
In the narrative of the song, Candyman spends time with his romantic interest, including wining and dining her, and fantasizes about her in a nightgown.

== Music video ==
The music video finds Candyman using a pair of magical glasses that allow him to see women without their workwear.

== Charts ==
Chart (1991)	Peak position
Australia (ARIA)	174
US Billboard Hot 100	91
