= Melt in Your Mouth =

1990 single by Candyman

Single by Candyman

from the album Ain't No Shame in My Game
- Released: 1990
- Genre: Hip-hop
- Length: 3:19
- Label: Epic
- Songwriters: John Shaffer III; Melvin Steals; Mervin Steals

Candyman singles chronology
"Knockin' Boots" (1990)	"Melt in Your Mouth" (1990)	"Nightgown" (1991)

Music video
- "Melt in Your Mouth" on YouTube

"Melt in Your Mouth" is a song by American rapper Candyman and the second single released from his debut studio album Ain't No Shame in My Game (1990). A hip-hop song with lighthearted R&B elements, it borrows the melody of "Could It Be I'm Falling in Love" by the Spinners. The song references the M&M's slogan "the milk chocolate that melts in your mouth, not in your hand".

== Critical reception ==
Colin Larkin considered the song one of the "more distasteful cuts" from Ain't No Shame in My Game.

== Charts ==
Chart (1990–1991)	Peak position
Australia (ARIA)	118
Netherlands (Single Top 100)	41
US Billboard Hot 100	69
US Hot R&B/Hip-Hop Songs (Billboard)	46
US Hot Rap Songs (Billboard)	3
US Cash Box Top 100	82
