= I Thought U Knew =

Studio album by Candyman
- Released: June 29, 1993
- Recorded: 1992–1993
- Genre: Hip Hop; Rap; R&B
- Label: IRS Records
- Producer: Candyman; DJ Quik; Frank Macek; Bob Morse; Jason Roberts

Candyman chronology
Playtime Is Over (1991)	I Thought U Knew (1993)	Phukk Watcha Goin' Thru (1995)

Professional ratings
Review scores
Source	Rating
AllMusic	2/5 stars

I Thought U Knew is the third album by rapper, Candyman. The album was released on June 29, 1993 for IRS Records and was produced by Candyman himself. The album was a huge commercial and critical failure not making it on any album charts or producing any hit singles.

== Track listing ==
1. "Skinz On Deck"
2. "Sex It Up"
3. "Wat Eva U Lyke"
4. "Candyman, Do Me Right"
5. "First Date"
6. "Just Like Candy"
7. "Life Goes On"
8. "Don't Cry Dry Your Eyes"
9. "Return Of The Candyman"
10. "I Thought U Knew"
11. "Get Respect"
