= If You Should Ever Be Lonely =

- US sleeve

Single by Val Young

from the album Seduction
- Released: February 10, 1986
- Recorded: 1984
- Genre: Funk; R&B; soul
- Length: 4:15
- Label: Motown
- Songwriter(s): Fred Jenkins; Valaria Young
- Producer(s): Fred Jenkins; Levi Ruffin, Jr.

Val Young singles chronology
"Seduction" (1985)	"If You Should Ever Be Lonely" (1986)	"Piece of my Heart" (1986)

"If You Should Ever Be Lonely" is a song by American singer Val Young, it was released in 1985 as the first single from her album Seduction issued by label Motown. The single peaked at number twenty-one on the U.S. Billboard R&B Songs chart. "If You Should Ever Be Lonely" was more successful on the US Dance Songs chart, hitting number-one for three weeks.

== Covers ==
Real McCoy covered the song for their 1995 album Another Night.

American pop/R&B singer-songwriter and producer Mariah Carey's 1999 US Billboard Hot 100 number one song "Heartbreaker" interpolates Young's composition in its Junior Vasquez club mixes.

== Track listings and formats ==
- US and UK 7" Vinyl single

A. "If You Should Ever Be Lonely" (Remix) – 4:00
B. "If You Should Ever Be Lonely" (Instrumental) – 3:54

- US and UK 12" Vinyl single

A1. "If You Should Ever Be Lonely" (Club Mix) – 6:32
A2. "If You Should Ever Be Lonely" (Club Mix Radio Edit) – 4:15
B. "If You Should Ever Be Lonely" (Street Mix) – 7:23

- US 7" Vinyl promo single

A. "If You Should Ever Be Lonely" (Radio Edit) – 3:54

== Charts ==
Chart (1986)	Peak position
US Billboard Hot Black Singles	21
US Billboard Hot Dance Club Songs	1
