= Knockin' Boots 2001: A Sex Odyssey =

Studio album by Candyman
- Released: February 6, 2001
- Recorded: 2000
- Genre: Hip hop Rap; R&B
- Length: 52:13
- Label: X-Ray
- Producer: Candyman

Candyman chronology
Phukk Watcha Goin' Thru (1995)	Knockin' Boots 2001: A Sex Odyssey (2001)	Platinum Hits (2001)

Knockin' Boots 2001: A Sex Odyssey is the fifth studio album by rapper Candyman. The album was released on February 6, 2001 for X-Ray Records and was produced by Candyman. The album was the fourth straight critical and commercial flop for Candyman and like his previous four albums, did not chart on any album charts or feature any hit singles.

The album was rated a 2.5 by RapReviews.

== Track listing ==
No.	Title	Length
1.	"Make It Hot"	5:29
2.	"Playa Haters"	4:12
3.	"Sumpthin About U"	4:43
4.	"Tennis Shoe Pimpin'"	3:36
5.	"Doin' 2 Much"	4:28
6.	"Hip Hop Love"	5:01
7.	"The Finest"	5:21
8.	"Bout 2 Be On"	5:18
9.	"Knockin Boots 2001" (featuring Ivy)	5:33
10.	"Mashin'"	4:28
11.	"Candyman 2K"	3:50
12.	"Bring It 2 Ya"	4:15
13.	"The Finest" (Remix)	5:19
