= Ain't No Shame in My Game =

Studio album by Candyman
- Released: October 2, 1990
- Recorded: 1989–1990
- Genre: Hip-hop
- Length: 36:47
- Label: Epic
- Producer: Candyman; Charlie Mack; Dette; DJ Scratch; Johnny "J"; Shatasha; Tea-Fly

Candyman chronology
Ain't No Shame in My Game (1990)	Playtime Is Over (1991)

Singles from Ain't No Shame in My Game
- 1. "Knockin' Boots" Released: 1990; 2. "Melt in Your Mouth" Released: 1990; 3. "Nightgown" Released: 1991

Ain't No Shame in My Game is the debut studio album by American rapper Candyman. It was released on October 2, 1990, via Epic Records with distribution by CBS Records Inc. The album was produced by the Candyland Band. It peaked at number 40 on the Billboard 200 and number 18 on the Top R&B/Hip-Hop Albums chart in the United States, and number 65 on the Album Top 100 in the Netherlands. It was certified gold by the Recording Industry Association of America on December 18, 1990.

The album spawned three singles: "Knockin' Boots", "Melt in Your Mouth" and "Nightgown". Its lead single, "Knockin' Boots", reached number-one position in the Netherlands, number 9 in Belgium and in the United States, and number 28 in Germany. "Melt in Your Mouth" peaked at number 41 in the Netherlands and number 69 in the United States. "Nightgown" made it to number 91 in the United States.

== Critical reception ==
Professional ratings
Review scores
Source	Rating
AllMusic	4.5/5 stars
Chicago Tribune	2.5/4 stars
RapReviews	6.5/10

The Baltimore Sun noted that "the album isn't entirely sugar-coated—there's plenty of bite as well, from the nasty funk of 'Don't Leave Home Without It' to the breathless rhymes of 'The Mack Is Back'." The Chicago Tribune wrote: "A slightly amusing rapper in the Fresh Prince/Young M.C. mold, Candyman's biggest fault is that he's a little too enamored of his own cleverness."

== Track listing ==
No.	Title	Writer(s)	Length
1.	"Ain't No Shame in My Game (Show)"	Candyman	2:35
2.	"Candy Man Theme"	Candyman; Rick James	3:23
3.	"Don't Leave Home Without It"	Candyman; Chris Kenner	4:05
4.	"Knockin' Boots"	Candyman; Willie Clarke; Betty Wright; Richard Wylie; Anthony Hamilton; Fabian Hamilton	3:53
5.	"Melt in Your Mouth"	Candyman; Melvin Steals; Mervin Steals	4:36
6.	"Playin' on Me"	Candyman; Bunny DeBarge	4:14
7.	"Today's Topic"	Candyman; Wanda Hutchinson	3:05
8.	"The Mack Is Back"	Candyman; Kool & the Gang	3:31
9.	"Nightgown"	Candyman; Prince; Seth Justman	3:19
10.	"Who Shakes the Best"	Candyman	3:11
11.	"Keep on Watcha Doin'"	Candyman; Rick James	3:36
12.	"5 Verses of Def"	Candyman; James Brown	4:29
Total length:			36:47

== Personnel ==
- Candyman – vocals, producer
- Charlie W. Mackie – bass, producer
- Johnny Lee Jackson – producer
- Shatasha Williams – producer
- Dette – producer
- Tea-Fly – producer
- DJ Scratch – producer
- Ken Komisar – executive producer
- Donovan "The Dirt Biker" Sound – engineering
- Tony Cannella – engineering
- Brian Gardner – mastering
- Mary Maurer – art direction
- Todd Gray – photography

== Charts ==
=== Weekly charts ===
Chart (1990–1991)	Peak position
Australian Albums (ARIA)	142
Dutch Albums (Album Top 100)	65
US Billboard 200	40
US Top R&B/Hip-Hop Albums (Billboard)	18

=== Year-end charts ===
Chart (1991)	Position
US Billboard 200	91
US Top R&B/Hip-Hop Albums (Billboard)	71

== Certifications ==
Region	Certification	Certified units/sales
United States (RIAA)	Gold	500,000^{^}
^{^} Shipments figures based on certification alone.
