= Real McCoy (band) =

German Eurodance band

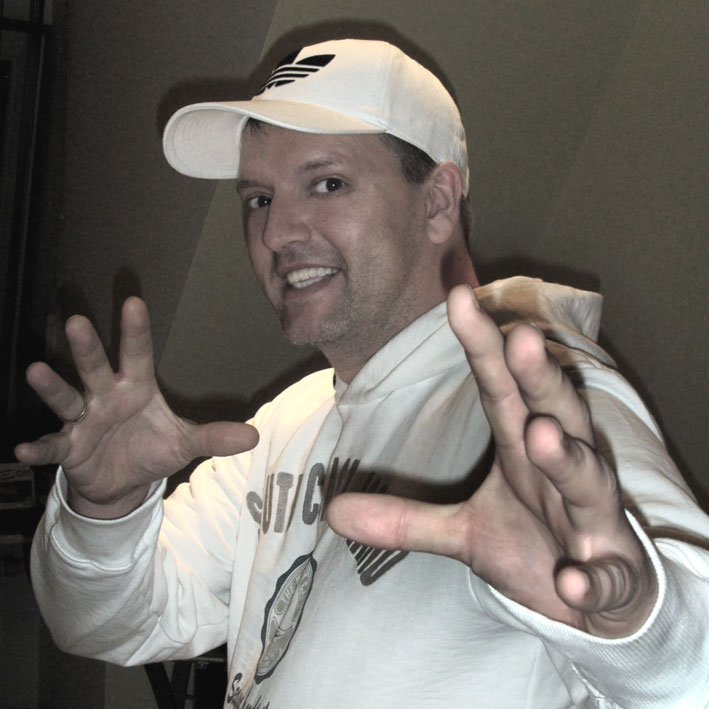
- O-Jay, the frontman of Real McCoy

Background information
- Also known as: M.C. Sar & the Real McCoy
- Origin: Berlin, Germany
- Genres: Eurodance; hip house; pop
- Years active: 1989–2001; 2016–present
- Labels: ZYX, Hansa, BMG, Arista, Phears Music/SME Records
- Members: Olaf Jeglitza (O-Jay); Sara Mosquera; Mac; K.I.S.T.E.
- Past members: Karin Kasar; Patricia Petersen (Patsy); Yvonne Parker (Sunday); Lisa Cork; Vanessa Mason; George Shampro Mario (M.C. Sar); Jason Ammon; Gabriele Koopmans; Ginger Maria Kamphuis; Gemma Louise Sampson; Debbie Butts
- Website: Realmccoy.de

Real McCoy (originally known in Europe as M.C. Sar & the Real McCoy) is a German Eurodance and pop music project best known for their hit singles throughout the mid-1990s: "Another Night", "Automatic Lover (Call for Love)", "Run Away", "Love & Devotion", "Come and Get Your Love", and "One More Time". Their first U.S. album Another Night went multi-platinum and charted in countries around the world.

== History ==
=== 1989–1990: Early success in Germany ===
The Real McCoy project (initially known as M.C. Sar & the Real McCoy) was the result of the successful collaboration between record producers Juergen Wind (J. Wind), and Frank Hassas (Quickmix), plus the rapper Olaf Jeglitza (O-Jay), under their music production company Freshline Records. Wind and Hassas wrote and produced the project's main hits between 1990 and 1994 at Wind Studios B.C. in Spandau, Berlin. Traditionally, Jeglitza was given additional producer credits alongside Wind and Hassas as J. Wind, Quickmix & O. Jeglitza for Freshline. In reality, Jeglitza only had a minor songwriting role on the team, and strictly provided rap vocals for the song productions. In 1993, he became the front man of the project.

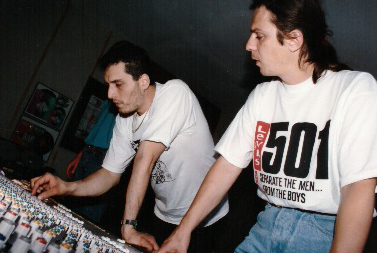
Real McCoy producers Frank Hassas (left) and Juergen Wind (right) at Wind Studios B.C in Germany

The first single from the project was a cover version of the hit "Pump Up the Jam" by Technotronic featuring new rap verses from Jeglitza. The single was released in 1989 and distributed by ZYX Records in Germany where it reached No. 16 on the singles chart. Following the unexpected success of the single, Wind took over the management of Freshline Records, and became the leading producer and composer behind the project. The follow-up releases were hip house style records. "It's On You" debuted in 1990 and became a top hit in Germany and a success in other European territories. The single was particularly successful in France, where it had earned silver status for selling 200,000 units. The growing success of the two singles motivated ZYX Records to request a live act, and a music video for "It's On You". A Frenchman of African descent named George Shampro Mario was hired to be M.C. Sar, and to act as the front man and rapper for the project. Unbeknownst to the public, he was really a lip-sync artist, who was miming the rap vocals of Jeglitza for the live performances and the music video. During this early stage of the project, Jeglitza remained completely anonymous. American singer Patricia "Patsy" Petersen sang the choruses on the single and fronted the project with Mario. Four more singles ("Don't Stop", "Make a Move", "Let's Talk About Love", and "No Showbo") and an album (On the Move!) were later released. Each of these follow-up releases failed commercially. In 1992, Freshline ended their relationship with ZYX Records.

=== 1993–1995: Mainstream success with "Another Night" ===
In late 1992, Freshline had formed a new partnership deal with Hansa Records (BMG Berlin) to release new music for the project. After a deal was finalized, Wind immediately began planning out a success strategy for the project, with Hansa's A&R executive, David Brunner and BMG President Andy Selleneit. The three then made a creative decision to change the musical style of the project from hip house to Eurodance and pop. Wind and Hassas wrote and produced the new single "Another Night" while Jeglitza wrote his rap verses. A producer duo known as the Berman Brothers (siblings Frank and Christian Berman) recommended to Wind their session singer, Karin Kasar, for the singing choruses. After hearing a demo of her voice, Wind selected her for the role. In exchange for her participation in the project, the brothers made a deal with Wind to be listed as producers with Freshline as Freshline & The Berman Brothers. They also made a deal with Wind to make the remixes for the single. A mix created by the brothers was selected to be the official single version of the song. Petersen remained the front woman and mimed Kasar's vocals for live performances and the music video for the new single. Wind and Brunner then decided to remove Mario from the project. Jeglitza was then promoted into a front man role alongside Petersen thus making the project a duo act. Brunner organized the marketing, promotion, distribution, sales strategies for the single and was credited as executive producer under the alias "D.N.B."

When released in the Summer of 1993, "Another Night" was only a minor hit in Europe reaching No. 18 in Germany and barely making the Top 100 in several other countries. Shortly after the release of the single, Wind and Hassas produced the Maxx hit "Get-A-Way" under the alias "The Movement". Brunner distributed the single through Intercord. When released in October 1993, the single became a major commercial success in Europe alongside the growing success of "Another Night".

By mid-1994, M.C. Sar & The Real McCoy had begun to achieve notable success on the charts alongside the massive success of the Maxx hits: "Get-A-Way" and No More (I Can't Stand It)". Thanks to the promotional efforts of BMG Canada, "Another Night" had suddenly hit No. 1 on the Canadian dance/urban chart in March 1994 and had remained on the chart for several weeks. The follow-up singles "Automatic Lover (Call for Love)" and "Run Away" and the album Space Invaders were then released in Europe. After noticing how quickly "Another Night" had reached No. 1 on the Canadian dance/urban chart, Arista Records CEO Clive Davis became interested in bringing M.C. Sar & The Real McCoy to the U.S. market. Davis had previously had success making the Swedish pop group Ace of Base a hit the U.S., and sought to do the same with M.C. Sar & The Real McCoy.

After a deal was finalized between Arista and BMG, the project name was shortened to Real McCoy and "Another Night" was released in the U.S. in mid 1994. The single had peaked at No. 3 in the U.S. by November 1994, and had quickly reached platinum status. The follow-up single release of "Run Away" was also a successful hit in the U.S. reaching gold status. Thanks to the success of the two hits, an all new U.S. release of the Space Invaders album was quickly planned for 1995. The project was officially re-branded as a trio act featuring Jeglitza, Petersen and newcomer Vanessa Mason. The Space Invaders album was re-titled Another Night. The cover art, imagery and marketing for the album was completely changed to present a lighter romantic tone. Several tracks from the album were removed for the new release. Davis commissioned a new team of producers to write and produce three new covers songs ("Come and Get Your Love", "Ooh Boy", "If You Should Ever Be Lonely (Deep in the Night)"), along with an original track (Sleeping with an Angel) for the album. The new production team included: songwriters Billy Steinberg & Rick Nowels, producer Shep Pettibone and the Lemon Productions team (Per Adebratt, Douglas Carr & Tony Ekman).

Thanks to the promotional efforts of Arista along with the popularity of "Another Night" and "Run Away", the album reached double platinum status and became a mainstream commercial success in 1995. "Come and Get Your Love" was released as the third Real McCoy single and reached No. 1 on the Billboard Hot Dance/Club Play chart. "Automatic Lover (Call for Love)" was also released late in 1995 as a fourth single but saw lesser success peaking at No. 52 on the chart. The Space Invaders track "Love & Devotion" was released in Europe and Australia as a Real McCoy single. It earned gold status in Australia and peaked at No. 11 in the United Kingdom. While Real McCoy's success was at its peak in 1995, the Maxx project had quickly begun to decline in Europe due to the lack of new hits on the European charts. By the end of 1995, the project had permanently disbanded. In May 1996, Real McCoy won a World Music Award for World's Best-Selling German Group.

=== 1997–1998: Group decline after One More Time album ===
In 1997, the follow-up album One More Time was released. Singer Lisa Cork was recruited as a replacement for Petersen and Kasar. Wind produced the album without Hassas or Brunner's involvement and instead worked with the Lemon Productions team (Adebratt, Carr & Ekman) and songwriter/producer Brent Argovitz. The Berman Brothers produced a cover of Shania Twain's "(If You're Not in It for Love) I'm Outta Here!" for the album, while also making new remixes for the singles. For promotional reasons, Jeglitza was credited as an executive producer alongside Davis. The lead single from the album, (also called "One More Time"), reached No. 3 in Australia and achieved platinum status but saw lesser success in the U.S. peaking at No. 27 on the chart. The follow-up singles "I Wanna Come (with You)" and the Shania Twain cover "(If You're Not in It for Love) I'm Outta Here!" failed to chart and were also commercial failures. The disappointing commercial sales of the album and the final singles lead to the quick demise of the lineup in 1997. In 1998, BMG re-released the original Space Invaders album, under the title Real McCoy – Love & Devotion in Germany.

=== 1999–2015: Real McCoy continuation and hiatus ===
In 1999 and 2000, two new Real McCoy singles were released with an all new line-up. Rapper Jason Ammon and singers Gabriele Koopmans and Ginger Maria Kamphuis were marketed as the 'new' Real McCoy. The first single released with the new line-up was a re-recorded version of "It's On You". Koopmans and Kamphuis recorded new vocals for the song, while Jeglitza re-recorded his original rap verses. A music video was filmed for the single in Miami, Florida, starring Ammon, Koopmans and Kamphuis with a cameo from Jeglitza. Ammon mimed Jeglitza's rap vocals in the music video. A second single titled "Hey Now" was released in 2000, featuring rap from Ammon and singing from Koopmans and Kamphuis. Both singles became commercial failures resulting in the demise of the new line-up.

After a long hiatus, Jeglitza (under the name Real McCoy) collaborated with the Polish band Ich Troje in 2006 to create the song "Follow My Heart". Jeglitza and the band represented Poland at the 2006 Eurovision Song Contest. The song, however, failed to qualify for the grand final. In early 2007, a new Real McCoy song titled "People Are Still Having Sex" was released in Germany. The single was a cover of the famous LaTour single of the same name.

In August 2009, Jeglitza performed as Real McCoy with singers Debbie Butts and Gemma Louise Sampson for DJ BoBo's "DJ BoBo and Friends" concert in Engelberg, Switzerland. Jeglitza also recorded the track "Two Hearts" with Butts and Sampson, but the track was never released officially.

=== 2016–2020: Return of Karin Kasar and Real McCoy revival ===
In 2016, Jeglitza returned again as Real McCoy with the original studio singer Karin Kasar. As a live duo act, Jeglitza and Kasar performed as Real McCoy at 1990s festivals worldwide.

=== 2020–present: Kasar's departure and line up changes ===
In January 2020, Karin Kasar revealed on her Instagram page that she was retiring from performing with the group. Real McCoy remained dormant for much of 2020 and 2021, with a handful of performances in the latter year with O-Jay as the sole member. In late 2021, Real McCoy announced that they would be returning for performances in 2022 with O-Jay, producer/hypeman K.I.S.T.E, and new vocalists Sara Mosquera and Mac. In December 2023, the band released a new single called "Magnify".

== Members ==
- Olaf Jeglitza (O-Jay) – rapper (1989–present)
- Sara Mosquera - singer, live performer (2022–present)
- Mac - singer, live performer (2022–present)
- K.I.S.T.E - producer, live performer (2022–present)
- George Shampro Mario (M.C. Sar) – frontman only, lip-sync (1990–1992)
- Patricia Petersen (Patsy) – singer, lip-sync (1990–1995)
- Yvonne Parker (Sunday) – session singer (1990)
- Karin Kasar – session singer, live performer (1993–1995, 2016–2020)
- Vanessa Mason – singer, lip-sync (1994–1997)
- Lisa Cork – singer (1996–1997)
- Jason Ammon – rapper (1999)
- Gabriele Koopmans – singer (1999)
- Ginger Maria Kamphuis – singer (1999)
- Debbie Butts – singer (2009)
- Gemma Louise Sampson – singer (2009)

== Discography ==
=== Studio albums ===
Title	Details	Peak chart positions						Certifications
Title	Details	GER	AUS	CAN	NZ	UK	US	Certifications
On the Move!	Released: 19 September 1990; Label: Galaxis; Format: CD, cassette, vinyl	—	—	—	—	—	—	
Space Invaders	Released: 24 August 1994; Label: Hansa; Format: CD, cassette, vinyl	65	—	—	—	—	—	
Another Night (US album)	Released: 28 March 1995; Label: Arista; Format: CD, cassette, vinyl	—	6	20	1	6	13	ARIA: Platinum; MC: Platinum; RIAA: 2× Platinum; RMNZ: Platinum
One More Time	Released: 25 March 1997; Label: BMG; Format: CD, cassette, vinyl	—	78	55	—	—	79	
"—" denotes a title that did not chart, or was not released in that territory.

=== Singles ===
Title	Year	Peak chart positions											Certifications	Album
Title	Year	GER	AUS	AUT	CAN	FRA	IRL	NED	NZ	SWE	UK	US	Certifications	Album
"Pump Up the Jam – Rap"	1989	16	—	—	—	—	—	100	—	—	—	—		On the Move!
"It's On You"	1990	11	—	4	—	8	—	3	—	—	—	—	SNEP: Silver	On the Move!
"Don't Stop (featuring Sunday)	1990	41	—	—	—	19	—	18	—	—	—	—		On the Move!
"Make a Move"	1991	—	—	—	—	—	—	—	—	—	—	—		Singles only
"Let's Talk About Love"	1992	—	—	—	—	—	—	—	—	—	—	—		Singles only
"No Showbo"	1992	—	—	—	—	—	—	—	—	—	—	—		Singles only
"Another Night"	1993	18	1	30	55	20	6	13	16	22	2	3	ARIA: Platinum; BPI: Silver; RIAA: Platinum; RMNZ: Gold	Space Invaders
"Automatic Lover (Call for Love)"	1994	20	18	—	—	38	—	—	44	19	58	52		Space Invaders
"Run Away"	1994	22	4	24	33	—	5	38	6	11	6	3	BPI: Silver; RIAA: Gold	Space Invaders
"Love & Devotion"	1995	37	7	16	—	—	16	26	28	16	11	—	ARIA: Gold	Space Invaders
"Come and Get Your Love"	1995	53	18	—	42	—	22	26	8	—	19	19		Another Night
"Sleeping with an Angel" / "Ooh Boy"	1995	—	—	—	—	—	—	—	—	—	—	101 102		Another Night
"One More Time"	1997	85	3	—	8	—	—	—	—	—	78	27	ARIA: Platinum	One More Time
"I Wanna Come (with You)"	1997	—	—	—	—	—	—	—	—	—	—	105		One More Time
"(If You're Not in It for Love) I'm Outta Here"	1997	—	—	—	—	—	—	—	—	—	—	102		One More Time
"Pump Up the Jam '98"	1998	—	—	—	—	—	—	—	—	—	—	—		Singles only
"It's On You"	1999	—	—	—	—	—	—	—	—	—	—	—		Singles only
"Hey Now"	2000	—	—	—	—	—	—	—	—	—	—	—		Singles only
"Follow My Heart"	2006	—	—	—	—	—	—	—	—	—	—	—		Singles only
"People Are Still Having Sex"	2007	—	—	—	—	—	—	—	—	—	—	—		Singles only
"Magnify"	2023	—	—	—	—	—	—	—	—	—	—	—		Singles only
"—" denotes a title that did not chart, or was not released in that territory.

Awards and achievements
Preceded by Ivan & Delfin with "Czarna dziewczyna"	Poland in the Eurovision Song Contest; 2006 (with Ich Troje)	Succeeded by The Jet Set with "Time to Party"
