= Candyman (rapper) =

American rapper

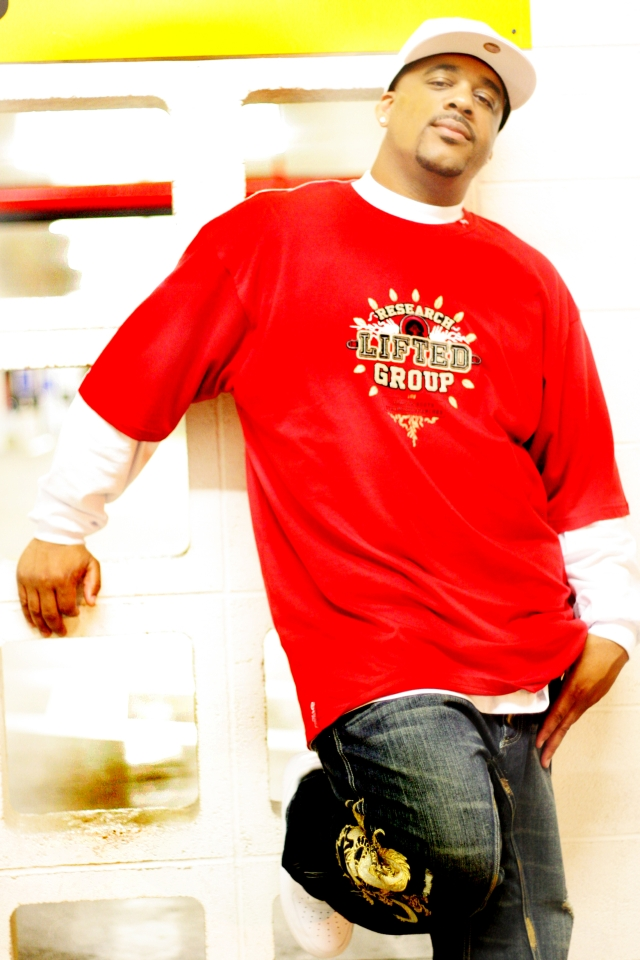

Background information
- Also known as: Candell Manson
- Born: John B. Shaffer III; June 25, 1968 (age 58); Los Angeles, California, United States
- Genres: Hip hop, R&B
- Occupations: Rapper, record producer
- Instrument: Vocals
- Years active: 1989–present
- Labels: Epic, Ruckus

John B. Shaffer III (born June 25, 1968), known by his stage name Candyman and also as Candell Manson, is an American rapper and record producer. He is best known for his hit single "Knockin' Boots". Candyman appears in the front row on N.W.A. and the Posse's 1987 album cover.

== Biography ==
Candyman was born and raised in South Central Los Angeles, where he attended Washington Preparatory High School. Manson's friend, rapper/producer Sir Jinx, introduced Manson to Dr. Dre, for whom Manson produced a three-song demo.

Candyman was featured backing Tone Lōc before he earned his own solo stint. His first recording as solo artist was the 1989 12" EP Hip Hop Addict, produced by Candyman his late friend Johnny "J". Prior to signing with Epic, Bill Walker from Thump Records, purchased the master of "Knockin' Boots" for Lowrider Soundtrack Volume 1 and took the single to KDAY and Power 106. Candyman eventually signed to Epic Records in 1989 and released his debut album, Ain't No Shame in My Game, in the following year. It scored a Top 10 Billboard Hot 100 hit with "Knockin' Boots". The following year, he released another independent LP for Epic Records, Playtime's Over. He released I Thought U Knew for I.R.S. in 1993.

In 2000, Candyman released Candyman's Knockin' Boots 2001: A Sex Odyssey, an album featuring his 1990 hit single remixed with new tracks as well."

In 2007, Candyman was featured in Nas's Where Are They Now (West Coast Remix), which also featured Breeze, Kam, King Tee, Threat, Ice-T, Sir Mix-A-Lot, and the Conscious Daughters which later appeared on Candyman’s compilation album released in 2012 entitled “Candyman’s Greatest Hits” which consists of songs from his previous albums as well as new songs recorded for the album.

== Discography ==
=== Albums ===
- Hip Hop Addict (EP) (1989) (King Quality)
- Ain't No Shame in My Game (1990) (Epic)
- Playtime's Over (1991) (Sony)
- I Thought U Knew (1993) (IRS)
- Phukk Watcha Goin' Thru (1995) (Ruckus)
- Knockin' Boots 2001: A Sex Odyssey (2001) (X-Ray Records)
- Candyman’s Greatest Hits (2012) (Thump Records)

=== Singles ===
Year	Single	Peak chart positions							Album
Year	Single	US Hot 100	US R&B HipHop	US Rap Songs	AUS	NED	BEL (FLA)	GER	Album
1988	"Money Talk$"	—	—	—	—	—	—	—	singles only
1989	"Hip Hop Addict"	—	—	—	—	—	—	—	singles only
1990	"Knockin' Boots"	9	5	1	58	1	9	28	Ain't No Shame in My Game
1990	"Melt in Your Mouth"	69	46	3	118	41	—	—	Ain't No Shame in My Game
1991	"Nightgown"	91	—	—	174	—	—	—	Ain't No Shame in My Game
1992	"Oneighundredskytalkpinelevenotwosevenine"	–	–	13	—	—	—	—	Playtime's Over
1993	"Candyman, Do Me Right"	—	—	—	—	—	—	—	I Thought U Knew
"—" denotes releases that did not chart or were not released.
