= Olaf Jeglitza =

German rapper (born 1965)

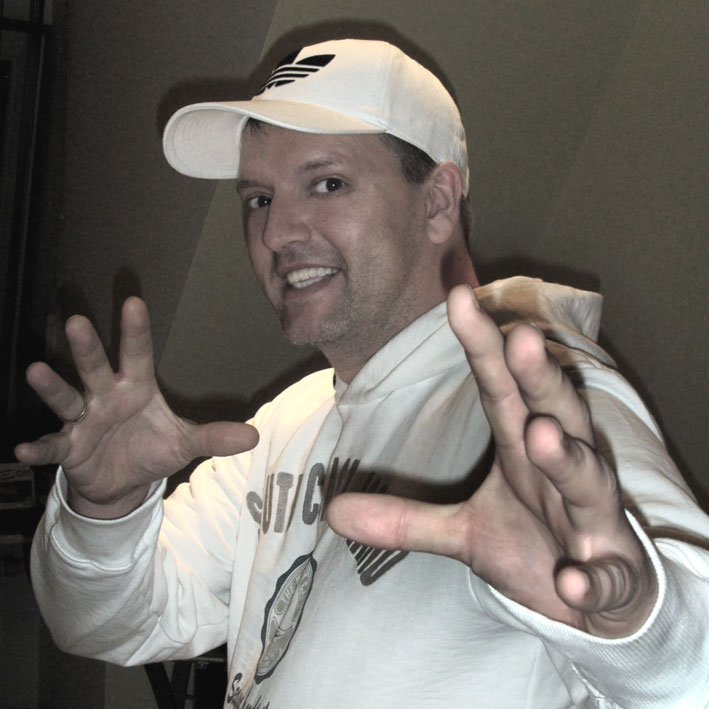
- O-Jay in 2006

Background information
- Also known as: O-Jay
- Born: 15 February 1965 (age 61); West-Berlin, Germany
- Occupations: Songwriter; Producer; Content creator; Photographer; Performer; Vocal artist
- Years active: 1984–present
- Labels: Jay Beat Recordings; Freshline Records; Move Music; Blue point Records; P5; blue pm; Triumph Musik; Phears Music; MRYFLD; RLMCCY Entertainment
- Member of: Real McCoy

Olaf Jeglitza (born 15 February 1965), known professionally as O-Jay, is a German rapper best known as the frontman of the '90s Eurodance and pop music project Real McCoy (also known as M.C. Sar & the Real McCoy).

== Early life ==
Jeglitza was born in West Berlin in 1965. After finishing school, he studied at the Lette-Verein, a technical college for photography in Schöneberg. At age 18, he started working as an independent photographer. After two years, he was hired by an advertising agency as an assistant photographer and became their head of the photo department a year later.

== Music career ==
=== 1984–88 ===
In the mid-1980s, Olaf Jeglitza was a key figure in the early Berlin hip-hop scene. In 1984, Jeglitza started working with the Berlin-based DJ and musician Frank “Quickmix” Hassas (Richie) and co-founded the collective Freshline, which was built on multiple pillars: a regularly published fanzine (Freshbeat Magazin), a cassette-based radio show (Freshline Radio Show), as well as event organization and live performances under the name of their group Masterplan. Masterplan consisted of Olaf Jeglitza (O.J. The Mighty Crash), Richie (DJ Quickmix), and the third member Aram Mouchegh (The A). The aim of Freshline was to establish an independent Berlin-based hip-hop culture inspired by American models. In this context, they also planned the creation of their own hip-hop label named Freshline.

The activities of Freshline were thoroughly documented in a two-page article in the Berlin city magazine tip (Issue 2/1987), which states: “The two [O.J. and Richie] are true enthusiasts and built up the Freshline organization.” – tip Berlin, Issue 2/87 In the same spirit, Jeglitza and Richie also founded the Imperial Nation Germany, an alliance of hip-hop activists in Berlin modeled after the Zulu Nation from New York.

In 1988, Jeglitza and Hassas together with DJ Careem Da Dream (Karim Zouaui) formed a new project called the Alliance. The first single release, "Action!" was released on their own label Freshline Records. The label sold approximately 20,000 units with the help of their distribution partner 99 Records. This first 12" was followed by more releases, leading them to a first label deal with Rough Trade Records. While "Action!" and the second release "Come into My Life – Rap Version" (The Admirers) ended up being re-released by ZYX Records, the first album of the Alliance (It's Time…) and a couple of other products were released by Rough Trade.

=== 1988–95 ===
1988 saw the birth of the group M.C. Sar & the Real McCoy, in connection with a production request by Reinhard Piel (head of A&R at ZYX Records) for a cover version of the Technotronic hit "Pump up the Jam". The following year, the group signed a new label deal with ZYX Records and made further releases by M.C. Sar & the Real McCoy, such as the song "It's on You". They also created a number of other productions, projects and remixes. Around 1992, the label had financial problems and O-Jay started to work part-time as a photographer again.

In 1993, M.C. Sar & the Real McCoy signed a new deal with the German BMG/Hansa label. The first single, "Another Night" was only a minor hit in Europe, barely making it into the top 100 in several European countries. With the help of Vincent DeGiorgio, the song reached number one in Canada and the act was signed to Arista Records in the U.S. thanks to Arista CEO Clive Davis.

With the upcoming release of "Another Night" in the U.S., the decision was made to change the name M.C. Sar & the Real McCoy, to simply Real McCoy. The single "Another Night" reached number three on the U.S. Billboard Hot 100 chart, where it had a 40-week run inside the top 40. The single was certified platinum (1,000,000 copies sold), and became the best-selling single by a German artist in the American market. "Run Away", the follow-up single, entered the top 40 of the Hot 100 Singles chart on 11 March 1995, eventually also reaching number three, and being certified gold (500,000 copies sold) in the US and over 1,500,000 copies sold around the world. The album Another Night was released by Arista in the US on 28 March 1995, and the group won several awards around the world. However, despite what some sources mention, there was no Grammy nomination involved.

=== 1999–present ===
In 1999, after the unexpected death of his father, Jeglitza focused on the production of other artists. In 2000, he founded the production service, Blue PM Productions.

In 2001, he produced the German boy band B3 in collaboration with the Berman Brothers and the German-based production company Maxi-Media. This was followed by several other top 20 and top 10 productions.

In 2003, they produced and wrote the hit "Ab in den Süden" performed by their artist Buddy. Shortly after, O-Jay had a heart attack but made a full recovery.

As of 2006, Jeglitza has been working for several national and international labels as a producer, songwriter, publisher, and A&R adviser.

Jeglitza represented Poland, with Ich Troje, in the 2006 Eurovision Song Contest.

In 2007, his new label Phears Music was launched, and the Real McCoy single "People Are Still Having Sex", a cover of the song by William David LaTour, was released.

In 2009, Jeglitza performed in Canada (July 2009, Z103.5 Summer Rush Halifax and Toronto concerts) and Austria (August 2009, DJ BoBo and Friends concert) as part of the current Real McCoy formation.

== Discography ==
=== Album appearances ===
Artist	Album	Date	Credit
The Alliance	It's Time...	1988	Producer / songwriter / artist / executive producer
MC Sar & the Real McCoy	On the Move!	1990	Songwriter / artist
MC Sar & the Real McCoy	Space Invaders	1993	Songwriter / artist
Real McCoy	Another Night	1994	Songwriter / artist
Real McCoy	The Remix Album	1996	Songwriter / artist
Real McCoy	One More Time	1997	Producer / songwriter / artist
B3	First	2001	Producer
Yvonne Catterfeld	Meine Welt	2002	Producer / songwriter
Buddy	Buddy Music	2003	Producer / songwriter
B3	N.Y.C.B3	2003	Producer
Shelo			Producer
Rod Michael		2003	Producer
Kim Styles		2003	Producer
D!Nation		2003	Producer

=== Single appearances ===
Artist	Title	Date	Credit
Masterplan	We Wanna Be Stars	1987	Producer / songwriter / artist
Captain Hollywood & B.P.M.	Tribute / JayBee	1988	Songwriter / Artist
The Alliance	Action!	1988	Songwriter / Artist
The Admirers	Come Into My Life - Rap	1988	Artist
The Alliance	Action! - Remix	1988	Songwriter / Artist
The Admirers	Come Into My Life - Rap (Re-Release)	1988	Artist
The Alliance	Action! - Remix (Re-Release)	1988	Songwriter / Artist
D.J. Chrizz	Hui Buh	1989	Producer
The Alliance	Sweat	1989	Songwriter / Artist
EMCEE	We're Cruisin´	1989	Songwriter / Artist
The Admirers	Tonite	1989	Songwriter / Artist
The All-Stars	Hello Babe	1989	Producer / Artist
Michael L. Williams	That Feelin´	1989	Producer
Quickmix feat. La Rose	Love Is In The House	1989	Producer / Songwriter / feat. Artist
The Deep	Curtain	1989	Producer
Berlin Adler	Touchdown	1989	Songwriter
Rap IV Rap	Keep On Movin´Rap	1989	Artist
M.C. Sar & The Real McCoy	Pump Up The Jam Rap	1989	Artist
Rap IV Rap	Let's Come Together	1990	Songwriter / Artist
Masterplan	Stars	1990	Songwriter / Artist
M.C. Sar & The Real McCoy	It's On You	1990	Songwriter / Artist
M.C. Sar & The Real McCoy	It's On You - Remix	1990	Songwriter / Artist
The Admirers	Got To Get Rap	1990	Songwriter / Artist
M.C. Sar & The Real McCoy	It's On You - The Re-Remix	1990	Songwriter / Artist
The Admirers	Out On A Limb	1990	Artist
M.C. Sar & The Real McCoy feat. Sunday	Don't Stop	1990	Songwriter / Artist
M.C. Sar & The Real McCoy	It's On You - UK-Remix	1990	Songwriter / Artist
Patsy	Dreamin´	1990	Songwriter / feat. Artist
Sugar Daddy	Are You Ready ?	1990	Songwriter
Jam Tronik	"Another Day in Paradise (Remix)"	1990	Remixer / feat. Artist
Jay Rapper	Wake Up	1991	Songwriter / Artist
M.C. Sar & The Real McCoy	Make A Move!	1991	Songwriter / Artist
Rap IV Rap	Hold you tight - Rap	1991	Songwriter / Artist
PRO-A	Trance	1991	Songwriter / Artist
M.C. Sar & The Real McCoy	No Showbo	1991	Artist
Construction	Oh girl !	1991	Producer
Hype-a-delics	So what !	1991	Songwriter / feat. Artist
Lucky Nineties	Ohh la la la	1991	Songwriter / Artist
M.C. Sar	Let's Talk About Love	1992	Songwriter / Artist
Cold as Ice feat. Eboni	¡ Urgent !	1992	Producer
Construction	Sex Is Like Fire	1992	Producer / Songwriter
Kirk Smith	Rise & Shine	1992	Producer
M.C. Sar & The Real McCoy	Another Night	1993	Songwriter / Artist
M.C.Sar & The Real McCoy	Automatic lover (Call for love)	1994	Songwriter / Artist
M.C.Sar & The Real McCoy	Automatic lover (Call for love) Remixes	1994	Songwriter / Artist
M.C.Sar & The Real McCoy	Run Away	1994	Songwriter / Artist
Real McCoy	Automatic lover (Call for love)	1995	Songwriter / Artist
Real McCoy	Love And Devotion	1995	Songwriter / Artist
Real McCoy	Come And Get Your Love	1995	Songwriter / Artist
Real McCoy	Sleeping With an Angel/Ooh Boy	1995	Artist
Real McCoy	Operator (Canadian Edition, Promo)	1995	Songwriter / Artist
Tronik	Magic Fly	1996	Producer
Real McCoy	One More Time	1997	Songwriter / Artist
Real McCoy	I Wanna Come (With You)	1997	Songwriter / Artist
Troja	Tiefer	1998	Producer
Ganesha	Jiggy Love	1998	Producer
Juize Club	Denise	1998	Producer
Troja	Träume	1998	Producer / Songwriter
Admirers feat. Killer and Ayman	Come Into My Life	1998	Producer / Songwriter
Savannah	I´ll Be There	1998	Producer / Songwriter / Artist
M.C. Sar vs. D.J. Dee	Pump Up The Jam - Rap 98	1998	Producer / Songwriter / Artist
Real McCoy	It's On You	1999	Producer / Songwriter / Artist
Killer	Bring It On	1999	Producer
Der Nachbar	Knall-Erbsen-Strauch (Die Antwort)	1999	Producer / Songwriter / Artist
Real McCoy	Hey Now	1999	Producer / Songwriter / Artist
Fev-Zee	Hadi Bir Bak	2000	Producer
Gangsta Boogie	Ernst oder Spass	2000	Producer
o-jay.com	Nite to remember	2000	Producer / Songwriter / Artist
Blockwart P.	Fett & Brutal	2000	Producer
Blockwart P.	Schwarze Witwe	2000	Producer
Oli. P & Jan van der Toorn	Girl you know it's true	2001	Producer
Husam	Bitte Bitte	2001	Producer
Diskobitch	Rock da beat	2001	Producer / Songwriter
Buddy	Ab in den Süden	2001	Producer / Songwriter
Marie Picasso	Tell the world	2001	Remixer
B3	You win again	2001	Producer
Catterfeld	Komm zurück zu mir	2001	Producer / Songwriter
Right Said Fred	Mojive	2001	Producer / Remixer
ATC	I´m in heaven	2001	Remixer
Roland Kaiser	Ich geh´mit Dir wohin Du willst	2001	Remixer
Marta	Yeah, Yeah, Yeah	2002	Remixer
Right Said Fred	Stand Up (For The Champions)	2002	Remixer
Acrylite	What Is It ?	2002	Songwriter
B3	I.O.I.O.	2002	Producer
Kim Styles	Every 1's A Winner	2002	Producer / feat. Artist
Buddy vs. D.J. The Wave	Ab in den Süden	2003	Producer / Songwriter
Düse	Nackig	2003	Producer
Buddy vs. D.J. The Wave	Ab in den Süden Remixes	2003	Producer / Songwriter
Buddy	Ab Auf Die Piste	2003	Producer / Songwriter
Buddy	Wattn Ding / Dicka gehts nich	2004	Producer / Songwriter
Buddy	Gott sei Dank (Wochenende)	2004	Producer / Songwriter
Alexander	Sunshine after the rain	2004	Producer / Remixer
Daniel Küblböck	The lion sleeps tonight	2004	Producer
Urbi & Orbi feat. Buddy	Wir sind Papst!	2005	Producer
Buddy	Mama Mallorca	2005	Producer / Songwriter
