= Run Away (Real McCoy song) =

1994 single by Real McCoy

- 1994 European single release

Single by Real McCoy

from the album Another Night
- Released: 18 July 1994
- Genre: Eurodance
- Length: 4:03
- Label: Hansa
- Songwriters: Jürgen Wind; Quickmix; Olaf Jeglitza
- Producers: Freshline; the Berman Brothers

Real McCoy singles chronology
"Automatic Lover (Call for Love)" (1994)	"Run Away" (1994)	"Love & Devotion" (1995)

Music video
- "Run Away" on YouTube

"Run Away" is a song by German Eurodance and pop music project Real McCoy (also known as M.C. Sar & the Real McCoy) from their album Another Night (1995), which was the US version of their second album, Space Invaders (1994). The song was produced by music producers Juergen Wind (J. Wind) and Frank Hassas (Quickmix) under the producer team name "Freshline". It was first released in Germany in July 1994 by Hansa Records. "Run Away" reached number three on the US Billboard Hot 100, where it was certified gold, and number six in the United Kingdom. A music video was produced to promote the single, made especially for the European market, directed by Swedish-based director Matt Broadley and filmed in Spain.

== Critical reception ==
Larry Flick from Billboard magazine stated that this follow-up to the certified platinum 'Another Night' "does not tamper with the European dance act's winning (and much-copied) formula of bouncy hi-NRG rhythms, topped with throaty male rapping and female chirping at the chorus. Single has already begun to gather deserved airplay from a number of crossover and top 40 stations on import—its domestic release almost guarantees instant success." Chuck Eddy from Entertainment Weekly wrote that the Berlin trio "has invaded U.S. radio by tap-dancing space-invader-disco synths beneath soul-diva testifying, "Sprockets"-accented raps, and Martian munchkin chatter. Yet there's an odd paranoid undercurrent flowing through tunes like 'Run Away' — the best dance-pop here isn't merely escapist; it's about escaping." Dave Sholin from the Gavin Report felt "the title of this one says it all. Programmers have been playing this import since late last year and now the official release is here. This one should be as big or bigger than their debut release". Howard Cohen from Herald-Journal described it as "tuneful".

Robbie Daw from Idolator named it "energetic" and "strobelight-friendly". Liverpool Echo called it a "rousing pop/rap track with an escapist message." Dennis Hunt of Los Angeles Times deemed it "awfully catchy". In his weekly UK chart commentary, James Masterton said, "All the elements that made 'Another Night' such a smash are here once again, it may be a standard Eurohit formula but it works so why argue? MC Sar mutters and grumbles to an electronic backing pausing only to let the chorus in at regular intervals." Pan-European magazine Music & Media encouraged, "Take a bit of this smooth slice of Eurodance, which serves as a preview for the forthcoming Space Invaders album. As the title implies ambient influences are present, even in the radio mixes." Alan Jones from Music Week called it "horribly catchy", stating that it "will be another substantial hit." John Kilgo from The Network Forty described it as "dynamite". Stephen Dalton from NME praised "sensual, rollicking beauties" like Corona's 'The Rhythm of the Night' and 'Run Away'. People Magazine said songs like this "pack so many beats into 4 minutes that just listening to them is thoroughly exhausting." James Hamilton from the RM Dance Update named it a "less distinctive follow-up" and "Boney M-ish". Mark Sutherland from Smash Hits opined that it "just sounds like 2 Unlimited in a blender". He wrote, "With its ohohohwoh yodelling, this sounds uncannily like Baltimora, the loin-clad oaf who had a hit with 'Tarzan Boy' and then swung across the jungle vines to dumperdom."

== Chart performance ==
In Europe, "Run Away" was a top-10 hit in Finland, Ireland, and the United Kingdom, where it peaked at number six on 29 January 1995, during its second week on the UK Singles Chart. It spent 10 weeks in total on the chart. In Belgium and Sweden, the song was a top-20 hit, as well as on the Eurochart Hot 100 and European Dance Radio Chart, where it reached numbers 12 and 20, respectively. In Austria, Germany and Switzerland, the single was a top-30 hit, while in the Netherlands, it peaked within the top 40.

Outside Europe, "Run Away" peaked at number three on the US Billboard Hot 100, the Billboard Dance Club Play chart, and the Cash Box Top 100. On the Billboard Hot 100 year-end chart for 1995, the song ranked in at number 38. In Canada, it reached number 13 on The Record Retail Singles chart, number 33 on the RPM 100 Hit Tracks chart, and number 10 on the RPM Dance chart. The song additionally had success in Latin America, Oceania and Africa, reaching number four in Australia, number five in Zimbabwe, number six in New Zealand and number ten in Peru.

== Music video ==
There were produced two different music videos for "Run Away". The first version, made for the European market and directed by Swedish-based director Matt Broadley, features singer Patricia "Patsy" Petersen walking in a desert-like setting while miming the vocals of studio singer Karin Kasar. It uses the shorter Video Mix and was filmed in Andalusia, Spain. The American version, directed by British music video and film director Nigel Dick, is set in a factory with many exhausted "slave-like" workers, while rapper Olaf "O-Jay" Jeglitza plays the role of "Big Brother", monitoring the workers' progress and demanding maximum productivity from them. It was never released for public broadcasting, since Arista felt that the image of the video was too dark and negative. In their native Germany, "Run Away" was B-listed on music television channel VIVA in August 1994.

== Impact and legacy ==
Retrospectively, AllMusic editor Bryan Buss named "Run Away" one of the standout tracks from the Another Night album. In 2015, Idolator included "Run Away" in their list of "The 50 Best Pop Singles of 1995". In 2017, American entertainment company BuzzFeed ranked it number 56 in their list of "The 101 Greatest Dance Songs of the '90s". In 2019, Billboard magazine ranked it number 419 in their list of "Billboard's Top Songs of the '90s".

== Track listings ==
- 12-inch, Germany (1994)

A1. "Run Away" (Club Attack Mix) — 5:45
B1. "Run Away" (Reel House Mix) — 5:45
B2. "Run Away" (Progressiv Mix) — 5:30

- 12-inch vinyl, US (1995)

A. "Run Away" (Club Attack Mix) — 5:45
B1. "Run Away" (Lenny B's Classic House Mix) — 5:12
B2. "Run Away" (Armand's Mighty Morphin Mix) — 7:39

- CD single, UK (1994)
1. "Run Away" (Airplay Mix I) — 3:52
2. "Run Away" (Video Mix) — 3:08
3. "Run Away" (Reel House) — 5:45
4. "Run Away" (Hallucination Mix) — 5:30
5. "Run Away" (Progressive House Mix) — 5:53
6. "Run Away" (Sound Factory Mix Vox Up) — 8:17
7. "Run Away" (Factory Dub) — 7:05
- CD single, US (1995)
1. "Run Away" (Single Version) — 4:07
2. "Run Away" (Club Attack Mix) — 5:49
3. "I Want You" (Album Version) — 4:48
- CD-maxi, Europe (1994)
1. "Run Away" (Airplay Mix I) — 3:52
2. "Run Away" (Airplay Mix II) — 3:58
3. "Run Away" (Club Attack Mix) — 5:45
4. "Run Away" (Reel House Mix) — 5:45
5. "Run Away" (Fly N' Away Mix) — 6:00
6. "Run Away" (Progressiv Mix) — 4:30
7. "Run Away" (Pulsar Mix) — 6:02
- CD maxi, Japan (1995)
1. "Run Away" (Single Version) — 4:04
2. "Run Away" (Club Attack Mix) — 5:46
3. "Run Away" (Reel House Mix) — 4:48
4. "Run Away" (Armand's Mighty Morphin Mix) — 7:44
- CD maxi (Remixes), Europe (1994)
1. "Run Away" (Video Mix) — 3:08
2. "Run Away" (Hallucination Mix) — 5:30
3. "Run Away" (Sudden Boom Mix) — 5:24
4. "Run Away" (Hooligan Rmx) — 5:38
5. "Run Away" (Progressive House Mix) — 5:53

== Charts ==
=== Weekly charts ===
Chart (1994–1995)	Peak position
Australia (ARIA)	4
Austria (Ö3 Austria Top 40)	24
Belgium (Ultratop 50 Flanders)	31
Belgium (VRT Top 30 Flanders)	11
Canada Retail Singles (The Record)	13
Canada Top Singles (RPM)	33
Canada Dance/Urban (RPM)	10
Europe (Eurochart Hot 100)	12
Europe (European Dance Radio)	20
Finland (Suomen virallinen lista)	4
Germany (GfK)	22
Ireland (IRMA)	5
Israel (Israeli Singles Chart)	18
Netherlands (Dutch Top 40)	33
Netherlands (Single Top 100)	38
New Zealand (Recorded Music NZ)	6
Peru (UPI)	10
Quebec (ADISQ)	9
Scottish Singles Sales (Official Charts)	5
Sweden (Sverigetopplistan)	11
Switzerland (Schweizer Hitparade)	25
UK Singles (Official Charts)	6
UK Dance (Official Charts)	18
UK Airplay (Music Week)	10
UK Club Chart (Music Week)	30
UK Pop Tip Club Chart (Music Week)	1
US Billboard Hot 100	3
US Dance Club Play (Billboard)	3
US Maxi-Singles Sales (Billboard)	1
US Top 40/Mainstream (Billboard)	3
US Top 40/Rhythm-Crossover (Billboard)	7
US Cash Box Top 100	3
Zimbabwe (ZIMA)	5

=== Year-end charts ===
Chart (1994)	Position
Sweden (Topplistan)	95

Chart (1995)	Position
Australia (ARIA)	36
Brazil (Crowley)	19
UK Singles (OCC)	66
UK Pop Tip Club Chart (Music Week)	26
US Billboard Hot 100	38
US Dance Club Play (Billboard)	31
US Maxi-Singles Sales (Billboard)	25
US Top 40/Mainstream (Billboard)	23
US Top 40/Rhythm-Crossover (Billboard)	25
US Cash Box Top 100	35

== Certifications ==
Region	Certification	Certified units/sales
United Kingdom (BPI)	Silver	200,000^{^}
United States (RIAA)	Gold	500,000^{^}
^{^} Shipments figures based on certification alone.

== Release history ==
Region	Date	Format(s)	Label(s)	Ref.
Germany	18 July 1994	12-inch vinyl; CD	Hansa	
United Kingdom	16 January 1995	7-inch vinyl; 12-inch vinyl; CD; cassette	Logic	
United States	February 1995	—N/a	Arista	
Australia	20 March 1995	CD; cassette	Hansa; Freshline	
Japan	24 May 1995	CD	Hansa; Arista	
