= Another Night (Real McCoy album) =

Studio album by Real McCoy
- Released: 28 March 1995 (US)
- Recorded: 1993–1995
- Genres: Eurodance; pop
- Length: 46:18
- Label: Arista
- Producers: Juergen Wind (J. Wind); Frank Hassas (Quickmix); Douglas Carr; Per Adebratt; Tommy Ekman

Real McCoy chronology
Space Invaders (1994)	Another Night (1995)	One More Time (1997)

Space Invaders

Professional ratings
Review scores
Source	Rating
AllMusic	3/5 stars
Robert Christgau	A−
Encyclopedia of Popular Music	3/5 stars
Entertainment Weekly	B
Gavin Report	(favorable)
Los Angeles Times	2/4 stars
Music Week	5/5 stars
People Magazine	(unfavorable)
Smash Hits	4/5 stars

Another Night is the third album by German Eurodance group Real McCoy (also known as M.C. Sar & the Real McCoy), released on 28 March 1995 in the US and on 8 May 1995 in the UK. It is a re-release, with a moderately varied track listing, of their second album Space Invaders which was initially released in Europe and other parts of the world in 1994. Another Night features the hit singles "Another Night", "Automatic Lover (Call for Love)", "Run Away", "Love & Devotion" and the hit cover version of "Come and Get Your Love".

When "Another Night" had reached No. 1 on the Canadian dance charts in March 1994, Arista Records CEO Clive Davis became interested in bringing M.C. Sar & the Real McCoy to the US market. Once a new deal was finalized, the project name was shortened to Real McCoy and "Another Night" was released in the U.S. in the Summer of 1994. The single had peaked at No. 3 in the US by November 1994 and had quickly reached platinum status. The follow-up single release of "Run Away" was also a successful hit in the US reaching gold status.

Due to the success of the two hits, an all-new US release of the album Space Invaders was quickly planned for 1995. The project was officially re-branded as a trio act featuring German rapper Olaf Jeglitza (O-Jay), Patricia Petersen (Patsy) and newcomer Vanessa Mason. The new album, retitled Another Night, is an updated re-release of their previous album Space Invaders (the European album released by the project in summer 1994); the cover art, imagery and marketing for the album was completely changed to present a lighter romantic tone. Several album tracks featured on Space Invaders were removed, and "Run Away" was replaced by its softer-sounding single remix. Davis commissioned a new team of producers to write and produce three new cover songs ("Come and Get Your Love", "Ooh Boy", "If You Should Ever Be Lonely (Deep in the Night)") and an original track ("Sleeping with an Angel") for the album. The new production team included songwriters Billy Steinberg and Rick Nowels, producer Shep Pettibone and the Lemon Productions team (Per Adebratt, Douglas Carr and Tommy Ekman).

Due to the promotional efforts of Arista along with the intense popularity of "Another Night" and "Run Away", the album reached double platinum status and became a mainstream commercial success in 1995. "Come and Get Your Love" was then released as the third Real McCoy single and reached No. 1 on the U.S. dance chart. "Automatic Lover (Call for Love)" was also released late in 1995 as a fourth single but saw lesser success peaking at No. 52 on the charts. The album track "Love & Devotion", which was remixed for international releases of Another Night was also released in Europe and Australia as single. It earned gold status in Australia and peaked at No. 11 in the United Kingdom.

== Critical reception ==
Music critic Robert Christgau gave Another Night an A−. Chuck Eddy from Entertainment Weekly wrote, "This Berlin trio has invaded U.S. radio by tap-dancing space-invader-disco synths beneath soul-diva testifying, "Sprockets"-accented raps, and Martian munchkin chatter. Yet there's an odd paranoid undercurrent flowing through tunes like "Run Away" — the best dance-pop here isn't merely escapist; it's about escaping." British magazine Music Week gave Another Night 5 out of 5, adding, "The latest leaders in the Euro dance scene come up with an album stacked with potential hits. Huge commercial success awaits this German/US combo who have already reached the US Top 20 with this album." Mark Frith from Smash Hits named it "a state of the art, pop-dance album".

== Track listing ==
=== Another Night (1995) ===
All tracks are written by Juergen Wind, Frank "Quickmix" Hassas, Olaf Jeglitza unless otherwise noted.

1. "Another Night" – 3:57
2. "Come and Get Your Love" (Lolly Vegas) – 3:14
3. "If You Should Ever Be Lonely (Deep in the Night)" (Shep Pettibone, Val Young, Fred Jenkins, Steve Feldman) – 4:05
4. "Run Away" – 4:03
5. "Sleeping with an Angel" (Rick Nowels, Billy Steinberg) – 4:37
6. "Ooh Boy (Norman Whitfield)" – 3:04
7. "Love & Devotion" – 4:30
  Listed as "'Love & Devotion' (Club Mix)" on the international edition of the U.S. album
8. "Automatic Lover (Call for Love)" – 3:47
9. "Operator" – 5:26
10. "I Want You" – 4:46
11. "Another Night" (House Mix) – 5:16

Another Night (U.S. album) (international version)

12. "Megablast" – 5:12
13. "Run Away" (House Mix) – 3:06
14. "Love & Devotion" (Development Corporation Mix) – 3:56

=== Space Invaders (1994) ===
All tracks are written by Juergen Wind, Frank "Quickmix" Hassas, Olaf Jeglitza.

1. "Space Invaders (The Opening)" – 1:04
2. "Automatic Lover (Call for Love)" – 3:48
3. "Run Away" – 4:03
4. "24 Hours" – 4:03
5. "Love & Devotion" – 4:18
6. "Another Night" – 3:57
7. "I Want You" – 4:35
8. "Operator" – 5:25
9. "Streetfighter" – 5:08
10. "Out of Control" – 5:00
11. "Je suis amoureux..." – 3:40
12. "How Deep Is Your Love?" – 3:52
13. "Another Night" (U.S. House Mix) – 5:16
14. "Megablast" – 5:09
15. "Space Invaders (The Last Crusade)" – 2:50

== Charts ==
=== Another Night ===
Chart (1995)	Peak position
Australian Albums (ARIA)	6
Austrian Albums (Ö3 Austria)	26
Canada Top Albums/CDs (RPM)	20
Hungarian Albums (MAHASZ)	20
New Zealand Albums (RMNZ)	1
UK Albums (Official Charts)	6
US Billboard 200	13

=== Space Invaders ===
Chart (1994)	Peak position
German Albums (Offizielle Top 100)	65
Hungarian Albums (MAHASZ)	21

=== Year-end charts ===
Chart (1995)	Position
Australian Albums (ARIA)	34
US Billboard 200	68

== Certifications ==
Region	Certification	Certified units/sales
Australia (ARIA)	Platinum	70,000^{^}
Canada (Music Canada)	Platinum	100,000^{^}
New Zealand (RMNZ)	Platinum	15,000^{^}
United States (RIAA)	2× Platinum	2,000,000^{^}
^{^} Shipments figures based on certification alone.
