= Knockin' Boots (Candyman song) =

Single by Candyman

from the album Ain't No Shame in My Game
- B-side: "Keep On Watcha Doin'"
- Released: July 20, 1990
- Recorded: 1989–1990
- Genre: Hip hop, R&B
- Length: 3:53
- Label: Epic
- Songwriters: John Shaffer III, Betty Wright, Willie Clarke, Eugene Hamilton, Popcorn Wylie, Albert Hamilton
- Producer: Johnny "J"

Candyman singles chronology
"Hip Hop Addict" (1989)	"Knockin' Boots" (1990)	"Melt in Your Mouth" (1990)

Music video
- "Knockin' Boots" on YouTube

"Knockin' Boots" is a song by American rapper Candyman, released on July 20, 1990 as the lead single from his debut studio album Ain't No Shame in My Game (1990). It is his most successful song.

== Background ==
The song was one of the first songs produced by Johnny "J", who used samples of "Ooh Boy" by Rose Royce and "Tonight Is the Night" by Betty Wright. Rapper Tone Lōc, who had discovered Candyman, provided a spoken intro for the song and also appeared in the song's music video. Upon its release in the summer of 1990, "Knockin' Boots" became a success and quickly made it to No. 9 on the Billboard Hot 100, spending 23 weeks on the chart. The song also reached the top of the rap chart and peaked at No. 5 on the R&B chart. "Knockin' Boots" reached gold certification on October 12, 1990 for sales of over 500,000 copies, before reaching platinum status on December 18 of that year for sales of one million copies.

The success of the single also led the Ain't No Shame in My Game album to achieve gold status on the same day the single reached platinum.

== Track listing ==
1. "Knockin' Boots" (Radio Mix)- 4:07
2. "Knockin' Boots" (12" Mix)- 4:35
3. "Knockin' Boots" (Instrumental)- 4:05
4. "Knockin' Boots" (St. James Remix)- 5:10
5. "Keep On Watcha Doin'"- 3:36
6. "Keep On Watcha Doin'" (Instrumental)- 3:36

== Charts ==
=== Weekly charts ===
Chart (1990–1991)	Peak position
Australia (ARIA)	58
Belgium (Ultratop 50 Flanders)	9
Germany (GfK)	28
Netherlands (Dutch Top 40)	1
Netherlands (Single Top 100)	1
US Billboard Hot 100	9
US Hot R&B/Hip-Hop Songs (Billboard)	5
US Hot Rap Songs (Billboard)	1
US Cash Box Top 100	10

=== Year-end charts ===
Chart (1991)	Position
Netherlands (Dutch Top 40)	9
Netherlands (Single Top 100)	16

== Certifications ==
Region	Certification	Certified units/sales
United States (RIAA)	Platinum	1,000,000^{^}
^{^} Shipments figures based on certification alone.
