= Another Night (song) =

1993 single by Real McCoy

- 1993 German single

Single by Real McCoy

from the album Another Night
- Released: 12 July 1993
- Genre: Eurodance; dance-pop; hi-NRG
- Length: 3:56
- Label: Hansa
- Songwriters: J. Wind; Quickmix; Olaf Jeglitza
- Producers: Freshline; the Berman Brothers

Real McCoy singles chronology
"No Showbo" (1992)	"Another Night" (1993)	"Automatic Lover (Call for Love)" (1994)

Music video
- "Another Night" on YouTube

"Another Night" is a song by German Eurodance and pop music project Real McCoy (also known as M.C. Sar & The Real McCoy). The single is featured on their hit album Another Night (1995), which was the American release of the project's second album, Space Invaders. The song was written by J. Wind, Quickmix and Olaf Jeglitza and was produced by Freshline (J. Wind and Quickmix) and the Berman Brothers. It was released in Europe on 12 July 1993, by Hansa Records, and two music videos were produced, directed by Nigel Dick (US version) and Angel Gracia (European version).

Initially a sleeper hit in Germany in 1993, "Another Night" would go on to reach the top three in the United Kingdom and United States in late 1994. It peaked at number one in Australia, Scotland and Zimbabwe, as well as on the Canadian and US dance charts. In 2008, "Another Night" was ranked at number 91 on Billboard magazine's "Top 100 Songs of the First 50 Years of the Hot 100". Ten years later, commemorating the 60th anniversary of the Hot 100, "Another Night" ranked at position 117. In 2025, the magazine ranked it among "The 100 Best Dance Songs of All Time".

== Background and release ==
"Another Night" was originally released in Europe in the Summer of 1993 through Hansa Records (BMG Berlin). At first the single was only a minor hit in Europe. It had peaked at No.18 in Germany but had barely managed to make the Top 100 in other countries in Europe. Thanks to the promotional efforts of BMG Canada, the single suddenly reached No.1 on the Canadian charts in the Spring of 1994. The success of the single in Canada caught the attention of Arista Records CEO Clive Davis who at the time had become interested in bringing another European music project to the US market after becoming successful with the Swedish pop group Ace of Base. Once a new deal was finalized between Arista and BMG, the project name was shortened to Real McCoy and an all new release of the single was quickly planned for Summer 1994. Thanks to the promotional efforts of Arista in 1994, "Another Night" quickly reached No.3 on the US charts and remained on the US chart for over 45 weeks. It was also certified Platinum by the Recording Industry Association of America. The single also achieved Platinum sales in Australia and Silver status in the United Kingdom.

== Composition, vocals, and lyrics ==
While singer Patricia "Patsy" Petersen stars in the music videos for the single, the actual vocals on the track were recorded with studio singer Karin Kasar. German rapper Olaf Jeglitza (O-Jay) wrote and performed the rap vocals on the single. "Another Night" was originally inspired by the Roni Griffith song "Desire" (1981), the Coca-Cola theme tune, and the Captain Hollywood Project song "More and More" (1992). The song lyrics tell the story of a woman who longs to be with the anonymous individual she encounters every night in her dreams. The rap vocals represent the man's voice in the woman's head, saying the things she wants to hear and promising to fulfill her desires and cover her with his love. However, each dawn brings pain to the vocalist, as she realizes: "When the night is gone, I'll be alone."

== Critical reception ==
Upon the release, Larry Flick from Billboard magazine described the song as an "instantly infectious and jaunty li'l rave/NRG jumper that may initially remind some of 'What Is Love' by Haddaway. A close spin, however, reveals a frothy confection that stands on its own pop merits. Nicely contrasted male/female duet vocals kick lovely, as do peppy remixes [...]. Already wooing folks aboard, single has the strength to keep the glow of summer parties lingering for a long time to come." David Browne from Entertainment Weekly said it is "a swooshing glop of diva-on-a-downer voice, Eurotrash synths, and rapping." Dave Sholin from the Gavin Report wrote that "those of you into catchy, high-energy, pop creations from groups like the Captain Hollywood Project or Culture Beat will love this track." Rachel Cohen from The Heights named it the best dance track of the album, along with "Run Away". She described it as "fast-paced and energetic". noting that it has "a distinct beat and sound". Howard Cohen from Herald-Journal called it an "infectious tune, bubbling with strobe-like keyboards and melody".

Dennis Hunt from Los Angeles Times felt it's "awfully catchy". In his weekly UK chart commentary, James Masterton said, "It stands out in many ways owing to the strange billing the act has." Alan Jones from Music Week gave the song a top score of five out of five, declaring it "a fiendish continental creation that's laid siege to Europe and is climbing the US Top 10." He added further, "A hugely commercial pop/dance confection with the usual male rap verse/female sung chorus combination that has proved so popular. File next to Whigfield." Wendi Cermak from The Network Forty named it a "great dance record". The magazine also compared it to "Rhythm Is a Dancer" by Snap!. Stephen Yang from The Rice Thresher noted the "sugary catchy beats and glitzy synthesizers". James Hamilton from the Record Mirror Dance Update described it as an "ultra cheesy German galloper, with 'put your hands up in the air' rather than the title as its hook line" and a "deadly catchy chugging German pop lurcher". Milo Miles from Salon Magazine felt the song "incorporate swank Philly-soul melodies in the manner of M People." Mark Sutherland from Smash Hits praised it as "infuriatingly catchy".

=== Retrospective response ===
Retrospectively, Bradley Torreano from AllMusic wrote that the song "is the biggest thing they have ever done; with its charming hooks, instantly recognizable keyboard part, and infectious rhythm, it might be one of the best dance songs to emerge out of the techno-pop explosion." Stopera and Galindo from BuzzFeed remarked that "this song is everything great about '90s dance songs combined into one song. So good." They ranked it number four in their list of "The 101 Greatest Dance Songs of the '90s" in 2017. David Balls from Digital Spy named it "some of the finest Eurodance of the 1990s." Robbie Daw from Idolator described "Another Night" as a "marriage of memorable pop choruses sung by a charismatic female and gruff rhymes delivered by a tough-guy rapper, all laid over a thumping beat." In 2018, Stacker ranked it number-one in their list of "Best Pop Songs of the Last 25 Years", noting "Another Night" as "the #1 pop song of the modern era." In 2023, Billboard magazine ranked it number 484 in their list of "Best Pop Songs of All Time", saying, "'Another Night' is essentially the midpoint between two other still-sparkling ’90s radio mix show fixtures: The dancefloor propaganda of Snap!'s 'Rhythm Is a Dancer' and the romantic delirium of Amber's 'This Is Your Night'." Two years later, in March 2025, the magazine ranked the song number 89 in their list of "The 100 Best Dance Songs of All Time", naming it "a melody as deliriously sweet as the feelings of love and longing being expressed."

== Chart performance ==
"Another Night" debuted on the US Billboard Hot 100 at number 77 on the week ending 27 August 1994. On the week ending 12 November 1994, the single reached its peak position of number three. The song also brought the group the distinction of having the longest run at number three, at 11 non-consecutive weeks. It stayed on the chart for 45 weeks. By the end of 1994, the single had sold approximately 700,000 copies in the US according to Nielsen Soundscan.

In Europe, "Another Night" was a number-one hit in Scotland and entered the top 10 in Belgium, Denmark, Finland, Ireland, Norway, and the United Kingdom, as well as on the Eurochart Hot 100, where it peaked at number 10 on 26 November 1994. It debuted on the chart at number 87 on 2 October 1993, after charting in Germany and Switzerland. On the European Dance Radio Chart, it peaked at number five the same week. In the United Kingdom, it reached number two during its fourth week on the UK Singles Chart, on 13 November 1994. It stayed within the UK top 100 for a total of 19 weeks. Additionally, "Another Night" was a top-20 hit in France, Germany, Iceland and the Netherlands. In Australia and Zimbabwe, it peaked at number one for six and two weeks, respectively, as well as on the Canadian RPM Dance/Urban chart and the US Billboard Dance Club Play chart. "Another Night" earned a gold record in New Zealand, a silver record in the UK and a platinum record in both Australia and the US.

In 2017, to mark the 25th anniversary of the Pop Songs chart, Billboard magazine released a list of the 100 best-performing pop airplay songs since the chart's beginning in 1992. "Another Night" topped the list.

== Music video ==
Two music videos were filmed for the single's release. In the US version for the single, Jeglitza is Real McCoy, the disc jockey of a pirate radio station powered by four men with handcycle-mounted generators. Petersen (lip-syncing Karin Kasar's vocals) is driving around town on her moped, mounting posters promoting McCoy's radio broadcasts while listening to the broadcast on a boombox. She is attracted to McCoy's voice and image, but has apparently never met him. As McCoy leaves his hidden studio after another night's broadcast, he walks by Petersen on her moped; recognizing him, she turns for a quick moment, and then rides on. This version was directed by British director Nigel Dick of Squeak Pictures and filmed on locations in London. John Simmons directed photography and Fiz Oliver and Catherine Finkenstaedt produced the video. Renee Graham of Boston Globe rated this version two and a half stars, saying that the band would become "consigned to cut-out bins." The video was a Box Top on British music television channel The Box in November 1994. Three months later, it received "prime break out" rotation on MTV Europe and was B-listed on France's MCM in February 1995. And it was nominated for two awards in the category for Dance at the 1995 Billboard Music Video Awards. The US version of "Another Night" was later made available on YouTube in 2009 and had generated almost 200 million views as of late 2025 on the platform.

The European music video was directed by Angel Gracia, featuring two alien robot characters: one male and one female. They communicate with each other via videophone, their conversation intercut with dance sequences from black-and-white movies of the 1920s and 1930s, as well as color snippets of Jeglitza and Petersen performing the lyrics to the song. The robots are also able to view each other directly, the male with a binocular headset and the female with a telescope. As the song progresses, the stiff movements of the robots become more fluid and dance-like. At the end of the video, the two robots meet, dance, and walk away together, arm in arm.

== Accolades ==
Year	Publisher	Country	Accolade	Rank
1995	Billboard Music Video Awards	United States	"Best Dance Clip"	nomination
1995	Billboard Music Video Awards	United States	"Best New Dance Artist Clip"	nomination
1995	Hi-NRG Music Awards	United States	"Best Group Performance"	1
2008	Billboard	United States	"Top 100 Songs of the First 50 Years of the Hot 100"	91
2013	Vibe	United States	"Before EDM: 30 Dance Tracks from the '90s That Changed the Game"	12
2014	Idolator	United States	"The 50 Best Pop Singles of 1994"	4
2017	BuzzFeed	United States	"The 101 Greatest Dance Songs of the '90s"	4
2018	Billboard	United States	"60th Anniversary of the Hot 100"	117
2018	Stacker	United States	"Best Pop Songs of the Last 25 Years"	1
2019	Billboard	United States	"Billboard's Top Songs of the '90s"	25
2022	Phoenix New Times	United States	"Songs That Make Us Think About Arizona (That Aren't About Arizona)"	Unranked
2023	Billboard	United States	"Best Pop Songs of All Time"	484
2025	Billboard	United States	"The 100 Best Dance Songs of All Time"	89

== Charts ==
=== Weekly charts ===
Chart (1993–1995)	Peak position
Australia (ARIA)	1
Austria (Ö3 Austria Top 40)	30
Belgium (Ultratop 50 Flanders)	4
Canada Top Singles (RPM)	55
Canada Dance/Urban (RPM)	1
Denmark (IFPI)	10
El Salvador (UPI)	9
Europe (Eurochart Hot 100)	10
Europe (European Dance Radio)	5
Europe (European Hit Radio)	10
Finland (IFPI)	3
Finland (Suomen virallinen lista)	6
France (SNEP)	20
Germany (GfK)	18
Iceland (Íslenski Listinn Topp 40)	13
Ireland (IRMA)	6
Israel (Israeli Singles Chart)	15
Netherlands (Dutch Top 40)	13
Netherlands (Single Top 100)	13
New Zealand (Recorded Music NZ)	16
Norway (VG-lista)	6
Quebec (ADISQ)	15
Scottish Singles Sales (Official Charts)	1
Sweden (Sverigetopplistan)	22
Switzerland (Schweizer Hitparade)	42
UK Singles (Official Charts)	2
UK Dance (Official Charts)	16
UK Airplay (Music Week)	4
UK Club Chart (Music Week)	24
UK Pop Tip Club Chart (Music Week)	40
US Billboard Hot 100	3
US Dance Club Play (Billboard)	1
US Maxi-Singles Sales (Billboard)	2
US Top 40/Mainstream (Billboard)	1
US Top 40/Rhythm-Crossover (Billboard)	5
US Cash Box Top 100	2
Zimbabwe (ZIMA)	1

=== Year-end charts ===
Chart (1993)	Position
Germany (Media Control)	74
Sweden (Topplistan)	73

Chart (1994)	Position
Canada Dance/Urban (RPM)	10
UK Singles (OCC)	31
US Billboard Hot 100	63
US Dance Club Play (Billboard)	29
US Maxi-Singles Sales (Billboard)	21
US Cash Box Top 100	41

Chart (1995)	Position
Australia (ARIA)	5
Belgium (Ultratop 50 Flanders)	62
Belgium (Ultratop 50 Wallonia)	82
Brazil (Crowley)	25
Latvia (Latvijas Top 50)	101
Netherlands (Dutch Top 40)	106
New Zealand (RIANZ)	50
Norway Vinter Period (VG-lista)	12
US Billboard Hot 100	6
US Maxi-Singles Sales (Billboard)	14
US Top 40/Mainstream (Billboard)	2
US Top 40/Rhythm-Crossover (Billboard)	19
US Cash Box Top 100	14

=== Decade-end charts ===
Chart (1990–1999)	Position
US Billboard Hot 100	51

=== All-time charts ===
Chart	Position
US Billboard Hot 100	117
US Pop Songs (Billboard)	1

== Certifications ==
Region	Certification	Certified units/sales
Australia (ARIA)	Platinum	70,000^{^}
New Zealand (RMNZ)	Gold	5,000^{*}
United Kingdom (BPI)	Gold	400,000^{^}
United States (RIAA)	Platinum	1,000,000^{^}
^{*} Sales figures based on certification alone.^{^} Shipments figures based on certification alone.

== Release history ==
Region	Date	Format(s)	Label(s)	Ref.
Europe	12 July 1993	CD	Hansa	
United Kingdom	25 October 1993	7-inch vinyl; 12-inch vinyl; CD; cassette	Logic	
United Kingdom (re-release)	24 October 1994	7-inch vinyl; 12-inch vinyl; CD; cassette	Logic; BMG	
Japan	2 November 1994	CD	Hansa; Arista	

== See also ==
- List of number-one singles in Australia during the 1990s
- List of RPM number-one dance singles of 1994
- List of Billboard Mainstream Top 40 number-one songs of the 1990s
- List of number-one dance singles of 1994 (U.S.)
