= Now That's What I Call Music! 32 =

Now That's What I Call Music! 32 may refer to the following Now That's What I Call Music! series albums:

- Now That's What I Call Music! 32 (UK series), released on 20 November 1995
- Now That's What I Call Music! 32 (U.S. series), released on 3 November 2009
