= Now That's What I Call Music! 50 =

Now That's What I Call Music! 50 or Now 50 may refer to two Now That's What I Call Music! series albums, including

- Now That's What I Call Music! 50 (UK series)
- Now That's What I Call Music! 50 (U.S. series)
