= Now That's What I Call Music! 39 =

Now That's What I Call Music! 39 or Now 39 may refer to two Now That's What I Call Music! series albums, including

- Now That's What I Call Music! 39 (UK series)
- Now That's What I Call Music! 39 (U.S. series)
