= Now That's What I Call Music! 45 =

Now That's What I Call Music! 45 may refer to three different "Now That's What I Call Music!" series albums, including

- Now That's What I Call Music! 45 (UK series)
- Now That's What I Call Music! 45 (South African series)
- Now That's What I Call Music! 45 (U.S. series)
