= Now That's What I Call Music! 60 =

Now That's What I Call Music! 60 or Now 60 may refer to at least two Now That's What I Call Music! series albums, including

- Now That's What I Call Music! 60 (UK series)
- Now That's What I Call Music! 60 (U.S. series)
