= Now That's What I Call Music! 62 =

Now That's What I Call Music! 62 or Now 62 refers to at least two Now That's What I Call Music! series albums, including:

- Now That's What I Call Music! 62 (UK series)
- Now That's What I Call Music! 62 (U.S. series)
