= Now That's What I Call Music! 54 =

Now That's What I Call Music! 54 or Now 54 may refer to both Now That's What I Call Music! series albums, including

- Now That's What I Call Music! 54 (UK series)
- Now That's What I Call Music! 54 (U.S. series)
