= Now That's What I Call Music! 59 =

Now That's What I Call Music! 59 or Now 59 refers to at least two Now That's What I Call Music! series albums, including

- Now That's What I Call Music! 59 (UK series)
- Now That's What I Call Music! 59 (U.S. series)
