= Now That's What I Call Music! 25 =

Now That's What I Call Music! 25 may refer to three different Now That's What I Call Music! series albums.

- Now That's What I Call Music! 25 (U.K. series), released on August 1, 1993
- Now That's What I Call Music! 25 (U.S. series), released on July 17, 2007
- Now That's What I Call Music 25 (N.Z. series), released on November 5, 2007
