= Now 64 =

Now That's What I Call Music! 64 or Now 64 refers to at least two Now That's What I Call Music! series albums, including:

- Now That's What I Call Music! 64 (UK series)
- Now That's What I Call Music! 64 (U.S. series)
