= Now That's What I Call Music! 46 =

Now That's What I Call Music! 46 may refer to two different "Now That's What I Call Music!" series albums, including:

- Now That's What I Call Music! 46 (UK series)
- Now That's What I Call Music! 46 (U.S. series)

including bonus track M
