= Now That's What I Call Music! 30 =

Now That's What I Call Music! 30 may refer to either of two Now That's What I Call Music! series albums:

- Now That's What I Call Music! 30 (UK series), released on April 6, 1995
- Now That's What I Call Music! 30 (U.S. series), released on March 24, 2009
