= Now That's What I Call Music! 38 =

Now That's What I Call Music! 38 or Now 38 may refer to two "Now That's What I Call Music!" series albums, including

- Now That's What I Call Music! 38 (UK series)
- Now That's What I Call Music! 38 (U.S. series)
