= Now That's What I Call Music! 56 =

Now That's What I Call Music! 56 or Now 56 may refer to two Now That's What I Call Music! series albums, including

- Now That's What I Call Music! 56 (UK series)
- Now That's What I Call Music! 56 (U.S. series)
