= Now That's What I Call Music! 31 =

Now That's What I Call Music! 31 may refer to two different Now That's What I Call Music! series albums.

- Now That's What I Call Music! 31 (UK series), released on 31 July 1995
- Now That's What I Call Music! 31 (U.S. series), released on 30 June 2009
