= Now That's What I Call Music! 65 =

Now That's What I Call Music! 65 or Now 65 refers to at least two Now That's What I Call Music! series albums, including:

- Now That's What I Call Music! 65 (UK series)
- Now That's What I Call Music! 65 (U.S. series)
