= Now That's What I Call Music! 55 =

Now That's What I Call Music! 55 or Now 55 may refer to at least two Now That's What I Call Music! series albums, including

- Now That's What I Call Music! 55 (UK series)
- Now That's What I Call Music! 55 (U.S. series)
