= Now That's What I Call Music! 61 =

Now That's What I Call Music! 61 or Now 61 refers to at least two Now That's What I Call Music! series albums, including

- Now That's What I Call Music! 61 (UK series)
- Now That's What I Call Music! 61 (U.S. series)
