= Now That's What I Call Music! 42 =

Now That's What I Call Music! 42 or Now 42 may refer to two Now That's What I Call Music! series albums, including

- Now That's What I Call Music! 42 (UK series)
- Now That's What I Call Music! 42 (U.S. series)
