= Now That's What I Call Music! 26 =

Now That's What I Call Music! 26 may refer to at least three different Now That's What I Call Music! series albums.

- Now That's What I Call Music! 26 (UK series)
- Now That's What I Call Music! 26 (U.S. series)
- Now! The Biggest New Hits on One Album 26 (Canadian series)
