= Now That's What I Call Music! 66 =

Now That's What I Call Music! 66 or Now 66 refers to at least two Now That's What I Call Music! series albums, including:

- Now That's What I Call Music! 66 (UK series)
- Now That's What I Call Music! 66 (U.S. series)
