= Now That's What I Call Music! 43 =

Now That's What I Call Music! 43 or Now 43 may refer to two Now That's What I Call Music! series albums, including

- Now That's What I Call Music! 43 (UK series)
- Now That's What I Call Music! 43 (U.S. series)
