= Now 63 =

Now That's What I Call Music! 63 or Now 63 refers to at least two Now That's What I Call Music! series albums, including:

- Now That's What I Call Music! 63 (UK series)
- Now That's What I Call Music! 63 (U.S. series)
