= Now That's What I Call Music! 15 =

Now That's What I Call Music! 15 may refer to four Now That's What I Call Music!-series albums, including

- Now That's What I Call Music 15 (UK series), released 26 August 1989
- Now That's What I Call Music! 15 (U.S. series), released on 23 March 2004
- Now That's What I Call Music 15 (NZ series), released in 2004
- Now! 15 (Danish series), released 27 March 2006
