= Now That's What I Call Music! 29 =

Now That's What I Call Music! 29 may refer to two Now That's What I Call Music! series albums.

- Now That's What I Call Music! 29 (U.K. series), released on 21 November 1994
- Now That's What I Call Music! 29 (U.S. series), released on 11 November 2008
