= Now That's What I Call Music! 28 =

Now That's What I Call Music! 28 refers to three different Now That's What I Call Music! series albums.

- Now That's What I Call Music! 28 (UK series), released on August 1, 1994
- Now That's What I Call Music! 28 (U.S. series), released on June 3, 2008
- Now! 28 (Canadian series), released on July 28, 2017
