= Now That's What I Call Music! 33 =

Now That's What I Call Music! 33 or Now 33 may refer at least two Now That's What I Call Music! series albums, including

- Now That's What I Call Music! 33 (UK series)
- Now That's What I Call Music! 33 (U.S. series)
