= Now That's What I Call Music! 58 =

Now That's What I Call Music! 58 or Now 58 may refer to two volumes in Now That's What I Call Music! series albums, including

- Now That's What I Call Music! 58 (UK series)
- Now That's What I Call Music! 58 (U.S. series)
