= Now That's What I Call Music! 44 =

Now That's What I Call Music! 44 or Now 44 may refer to two Now That's What I Call Music! series albums, including

- Now That's What I Call Music! 44 (UK series)
- Now That's What I Call Music! 44 (U.S. series)
