= Now That's What I Call Country Volume 4 =

Compilation album by Various artists
- Released: June 14, 2011
- Genre: Country
- Length: 65:21
- Label: Universal Music

Series chronology
Now That's What I Call the 80s Hits (2011)	Now That's What I Call Country Volume 4 (2011)	Now That's What I Call Music! 39 (2011)

Country series chronology
Now That's What I Call Country Volume 3 (2010)	Now That's What I Call Country Volume 4 (2011)	Now That's What I Call Country Volume 5 (2012)

Now That's What I Call Country Volume 4 is an album from the Now! series released in the United States on June 14, 2011.

== Track listing ==
No.	Title	Artist	Length
1.	"Hello World"	Lady Antebellum	4:28
2.	"If I Die Young"	The Band Perry	3:40
3.	"Who Are You When I'm Not Looking"	Blake Shelton	3:05
4.	"Are You Gonna Kiss Me or Not"	Thompson Square	3:02
5.	"Stuck Like Glue"	Sugarland	4:05
6.	"Undo It"	Carrie Underwood	2:56
7.	"Put You in a Song"	Keith Urban	3:36
8.	"Roll with It"	Easton Corbin	3:26
9.	"Only Prettier"	Miranda Lambert	3:06
10.	"Smoke a Little Smoke"	Eric Church	3:06
11.	"Voices"	Chris Young	3:03
12.	"Someone Else Calling You Baby"	Luke Bryan	3:44
13.	"Come Back Song"	Darius Rucker	3:51
14.	"What Do You Want"	Jerrod Niemann	3:34
15.	"Let Me Down Easy"	Billy Currington	3:44
16.	"Back to December"	Taylor Swift	4:51
17.	"Colder Weather"	Zac Brown Band	4:30
18.	"The Breath You Take"	George Strait	3:34
19.	"The Boys of Fall"	Kenny Chesney	6:32
20.	"My Kinda Party"	Jason Aldean	4:45

== Reception ==
Professional ratings
Review scores
Source	Rating
Allmusic	3.5/5 stars

Steve Leggett of Allmusic believes the fourth installment of the Now That's What I Call Country series proves that contemporary country radio is "filling the void that used to be occupied by classic pop and rock songs." The value of this collection and others in the series is that they zero in on a very specific period of time, "making a little music box of memories for that unique and fleeting moment in time."

== Charts ==
=== Weekly charts ===
Chart (2011)	Peak position
US Billboard 200	14
US Top Country Albums (Billboard)	3

=== Year-end charts ===
Chart (2011)	Position
US Top Country Albums (Billboard)	38
