= Now That's What I Call Rock =

Compilation album by Various artists
- Released: January 22, 2016
- Genre: Rock
- Length: 72:58
- Label: UMG; Sony

Series chronology
Now That's What I Call a Workout 2016 (2015)	Now That's What I Call Rock (2016)	Now That's What I Call Music! 57 (2016)

Now That's What I Call Rock is a compilation album released on January 22, 2016, by the distributors of the popular Now That's What I Call Music series in the United States. The collection brings together a diverse group of artists from a range of styles such as "EDM textures, summer festival blues-rock chug, arena alternative, post-Tool hard rock, triumphant psych-pop and cosmopolitan retro experiments."

== Development ==
Despite the popularity of the Now albums, rock compilations have been an area of neglect by record companies. To reach out to a broad audience, the first rock volume of Now features contemporary pop acts with rock roots and takes a "big-tent" approach to the genre. Cliff Chenfeld, co-owner of the Razor & Tie and a consultant for Now That’s What I Call Rock, feels "most music listeners are pretty open" and this release "is a means of introducing some of those bands to that broader audience who I think would embrace it."

The compilers of the set wanted to avoid defining what rock music is in 2016, but instead tried to give what people think it is, "as opposed to using a term for rock that might have defined what rock" used to be.

== Reception ==
James Christopher Monger of AllMusic notes the "wide range of rock subgenres" represented in this compilation.

== Track listing ==
No.	Title	Artist(s)	Length
1.	"Throne"	Bring Me the Horizon	3:09
2.	"Cut the Cord"	Shinedown	3:41
3.	"Uma Thurman"	Fall Out Boy	3:31
4.	"Little Monster"	Royal Blood	3:31
5.	"Words as Weapons"	Seether	3:59
6.	"Mess Around"	Cage the Elephant	2:52
7.	"Could Have Been Me"	The Struts	3:06
8.	"I Bet My Life"	Imagine Dragons	3:11
9.	"First"	Cold War Kids	3:17
10.	"Shut Up and Dance"	Walk the Moon	3:16
11.	"Renegades"	X Ambassadors	3:14
12.	"Nearly Forgot My Broken Heart"	Chris Cornell	3:52
13.	"S.O.B."	Nathaniel Rateliff & the Night Sweats	4:05
14.	"Ex's & Oh's"	Elle King	3:20
15.	"Ship to Wreck"	Florence and the Machine	3:52
16.	"Electric Love"	Børns	3:36
17.	"Failure"	Breaking Benjamin	3:33
18.	"The Otherside"	Red Sun Rising	3:39
19.	"Paralyzed"	Failure Anthem	3:08
20.	"Lightning in the Sky"	Devour the Day	3:22
21.	"Bros"	Wolf Alice	3:44

== Charts ==
Chart (2016)	Peak position
US Billboard 200	137
US Top Rock Albums (Billboard)	10
