= Now That's What I Call Music! 50 (American series) =

Compilation album by Various artists
- Released: May 6, 2014
- Length: 76:43
- Label: Universal Music Enterprises

Numbered series chronology
Now That's What I Call Music! 49 (2014)	Now That's What I Call Music! 50 (2014)	Now That's What I Call Music! 51 (2014)

Now That's What I Call Music! 50 is the 50th edition of the Now! series in the United States, released on May 6, 2014. The album features 21 tracks including the Billboard Hot 100 number-one hits, "Happy", "Dark Horse" and "All of Me".

A special deluxe edition includes 14 additional tracks from previously released volumes of the series as selected through an online voting process.

The album sold 153,000 copies and debuted at number one on the Billboard 200 albums chart. The album is the 18th album in the series to reach the top of chart, and, as of 2025, the most recent in the American series to do so. The Beatles are the only artist to amass more number ones (19) than the Now series. As of October 2014, the compilation has sold 642,000 copies. In 2019, the album reached number 135 on the Billboard 200's Decade-End chart.

== Track listing ==
No.	Title	Artist(s)	Length
1.	"Happy"	Pharrell Williams	3:51
2.	"Dark Horse"	Katy Perry featuring Juicy J	3:32
3.	"The Man"	Aloe Blacc	3:29
4.	"Hey Brother"	Avicii featuring Dan Tyminski	4:12
5.	"Pompeii"	Bastille	3:32
6.	"Team"	Lorde	3:11
7.	"Talk Dirty"	Jason Derulo featuring 2 Chainz and Rie Abe	2:56
8.	"Selfie"	The Chainsmokers featuring Alexis Killacam	3:01
9.	"Turn Down for What"	DJ Snake and Lil Jon	3:32
10.	"Show Me"	Kid Ink featuring Chris Brown	3:36
11.	"La La La"	Naughty Boy featuring Sam Smith	3:36
12.	"Young Girls"	Bruno Mars	3:48
13.	"Adore You"	Miley Cyrus	4:36
14.	"All of Me"	John Legend	4:29
15.	"Let Her Go"	Passenger	4:09
16.	"Best Day of My Life"	American Authors	3:13
17.	"She Keeps Me Warm"	Mary Lambert	3:49
18.	"Ten Feet Tall"	Wrabel	3:36
19.	"Youth"	Foxes	3:40
20.	"Big Talk"	Conway	3:39
21.	"On My Mind"	Pia Mia	3:04

=== Deluxe Edition (Disc 2) ===
No.	Title	Artist(s)	Length
1.	"Firework" (from Now! 37)	Katy Perry	3:46
2.	"Stronger (What Doesn't Kill You)" (from Now! 42)	Kelly Clarkson	3:39
3.	"Poker Face" (from Now! 31)	Lady Gaga	3:56
4.	"I Gotta Feeling" (from Now! 32)	The Black Eyed Peas	4:04
5.	"Hot in Herre" (from Now! 11)	Nelly	3:48
6.	"Call Me Maybe" (from Now! 43)	Carly Rae Jepsen	3:12
7.	"...Baby One More Time" (from Now! 2)	Britney Spears	3:29
8.	"Hey, Soul Sister" (from Now! 33)	Train	3:34
9.	"Somebody That I Used to Know" (from Now! 42)	Gotye featuring Kimbra	4:03
10.	"Just Give Me a Reason" (from Now! 46)	Pink featuring Nate Ruess	4:01
11.	"Need You Now" (from Now! 33)	Lady Antebellum	3:52
12.	"We Are Never Ever Getting Back Together" (from Now! 45)	Taylor Swift	3:11
13.	"Hey There Delilah" (from Now! 26)	Plain White T's	3:35
14.	"As Long as You Love Me" (from Now!)	Backstreet Boys	3:31

== Charts ==
=== Weekly charts ===
Chart (2014)	Peak position
US Billboard 200	1

=== Year-end charts ===
Chart (2014)	Position
US Billboard 200	15

=== Decade-end charts ===
Chart (2010–2019)	Position
US Billboard 200	135
