= Now That's What I Call Disney =

- UK album cover

Compilation album by Various artists
- Released: November 21, 2011
- Length: 189:29 (UK); 67:45 (US)
- Label: Walt Disney

Now That's What I Call Disney (US)
- US album cover

US series chronology
Now That's What I Call Music! 44 (2012)	Now That's What I Call Disney (2012)	Now That's What I Call Music! 45 (2013)

Now That's What I Call Disney is a compilation album from the Now! series released in the United Kingdom as a 3-disc set on November 21, 2011. It was re-released the following year with a bonus disc of Disney-related Christmas songs. An abbreviated single-disc version was released in the United States on November 6, 2012. The UK version takes songs from the vast Disney library from its animated classics, Pixar films and live-action performances from Hannah Montana and High School Musical. The US version, at 20 tracks, contains songs only from Disney and Pixar animated features. In the United States, Now That's What I Call Disney 2 was released in November 2013 and Now That's What I Call Disney 3 was released in October 2014.

Three reissues of the album, featuring songs from newer animated classics, Pixar films and live-action television shows and films, have been released in the UK; one in 2014, one in 2017, and one in 2021. A companion album, Now That's What I Call Disney Bedtime, was released in 2018.

== UK track listing ==
=== Disc 1 ===
1. "Into the Unknown" - Frozen II
2. "Remember Me" - Coco
3. "Circle of Life/Nants' Ingonyama" - The Lion King 2019
4. "Beauty and the Beast" - Beauty and the Beast
5. "Reflection" - Mulan
6. "Trip a Little Light Fantastic" - Mary Poppins Returns
7. "Prince Ali" - Aladdin 2019
8. "You've Got a Friend in Me" - Toy Story
9. "Under the Sea" - The Little Mermaid
10. "You're Welcome" - Moana
11. "Breaking Free" - High School Musical
12. "Hakuna Matata" - The Lion King
13. "Supercalifragilisticexpialidocious" - Mary Poppins
14. "What's This?" - The Nightmare Before Christmas
15. "Be Our Guest" - Beauty and the Beast
16. "A Whole New World" - Aladdin
17. "Can You Feel the Love Tonight" - The Lion King
18. "I Can't Let You Throw Yourself Away" - Toy Story 4
19. "The Best of Both Worlds" - Hannah Montana
20. "I Think I Kinda, You Know" - High School Musical: The Musical: The Series

=== Disc 2 ===
1. "Let It Go" - Frozen
2. "Born to Be Brave" - High School Musical: The Musical: The Series
3. "Kiss the Girl" - The Little Mermaid
4. "Un Poco Loco" - Coco
5. "I Just Can't Wait to Be King" - The Lion King
6. "The Wonderful Thing About Tiggers" - Winnie the Pooh and the Blustery Day
7. "Heigh-Ho" - Snow White and the Seven Dwarfs
8. "Bibbidi-Bobbidi-Boo" - Cinderella
9. "Trust in Me" - The Jungle Book 2016
10. "Baby Mine" - Dumbo
11. "Let's Go Fly a Kite" - Mary Poppins
12. "When She Loved Me" - Toy Story 2
13. "Belle" - Beauty and the Beast
14. "Colors of the Wind" - Pocahontas
15. "That's How You Know" - Enchanted
16. "Speechless" - Aladdin 2019
17. "A Star Is Born" - Hercules
18. "I See the Light" - Tangled
19. "When We're Human" - The Princess and the Frog
20. "Circle of Life" - The Lion King

=== Disc 3 ===
1. "The Bare Necessities" - The Jungle Book
2. "A Spoonful of Sugar" - Mary Poppins
3. "Whistle While You Work" - Snow White and the Seven Dwarfs
4. "Cruella De Vil" - One Hundred and One Dalmatians
5. "Bella Notte" - Lady and the Tramp
6. "They Live in You" - The Lion King: The Musical
7. "When Will My Life Begin?" - Tangled
8. "Just Around the Riverbend" - Pocahontas
9. "One Jump Ahead" - Aladdin
10. "I Won't Say (I'm in Love)" - Hercules
11. "Part of Your World" - The Little Mermaid
12. "The Place Where Lost Things Go" - Mary Poppins Returns
13. "We Belong Together" - Toy Story 3
14. "Hawaiian Roller Coaster Ride" - Lilo & Stitch
15. "Lava" - Lava
16. "Zero to Hero" - Hercules
17. "Rotten to the Core" - Descendants
18. "Evermore" - Beauty and the Beast 2017
19. "I'll Try" - Return to Never Land
20. "Man or Muppet" - The Muppets

=== Disc 4 ===
1. "Mickey Mouse March" - The Mickey Mouse Club
2. "When You Wish Upon a Star" - Pinocchio
3. "A Dream Is a Wish Your Heart Makes" - Cinderella
4. "Someday My Prince Will Come" - Snow White and the Seven Dwarfs
5. "Once Upon a Dream" - Sleeping Beauty
6. "You Can Fly" - Peter Pan
7. "Give a Little Whistle" - Pinocchio
8. "He's a Tramp" - Lady and the Tramp
9. "Chim Chim Cher-ee" - Mary Poppins
10. "Yo Ho (A Pirate's Life for Me)" - Pirates of the Caribbean
11. "He's a Pirate" - Pirates of the Caribbean: The Curse of the Black Pearl
12. "The Unbirthday Song" - Alice in Wonderland
13. "Pink Elephants on Parade" - Dumbo
14. "Happy Working Song" - Enchanted
15. "Almost There" - The Princess and the Frog
16. "Scales and Arpeggios" - The Aristocats
17. "Little April Shower" - Bambi
18. "So This Is Love" - Cinderella
19. "It's a Small World" - It's a Small World
20. "Mickey Mouse Club, Alma Mater" - The Mickey Mouse Club

== US track listing ==
=== Volume 1 ===
1. "When You Wish Upon a Star" - Pinocchio
2. "Someday My Prince Will Come" - Snow White and the Seven Dwarfs
3. "Circle of Life" - The Lion King
4. "Kiss the Girl" - The Little Mermaid
5. "Colors of the Wind" - Pocahontas
6. "The Bare Necessities" - The Jungle Book
7. "Beauty and the Beast" - Beauty and the Beast
8. "A Whole New World" - Aladdin
9. "A Dream Is a Wish Your Heart Makes" - Cinderella
10. "Once Upon a Dream" - Sleeping Beauty
11. "Everybody Wants to Be a Cat" - The Aristocats
12. "You Can Fly" - Peter Pan
13. "You've Got a Friend in Me" - Toy Story
14. "I See the Light" - Tangled
15. "Cruella De Vil" - One Hundred and One Dalmatians
16. "Go the Distance" - Hercules
17. "Bella Notte" - Lady and the Tramp
18. "Life Is a Highway" - Cars
19. "Hawaiian Roller Coaster Ride" - Lilo & Stitch
20. "Reflection" - Mulan

=== Volume 2 ===
1. "We Belong Together" - Toy Story 3
2. "Under the Sea" - The Little Mermaid
3. "Can You Feel the Love Tonight" - The Lion King
4. "I Wan'na Be Like You" - The Jungle Book
5. "Supercalifragilisticexpialidocious" - Mary Poppins
6. "Zip-a-Dee-Doo-Dah" - Song of the South
7. "Reception at the Palace/So This Is Love" - Cinderella
8. "Be Our Guest" - Beauty and the Beast
9. "Happy Working Song" - Enchanted
10. "It's a Small World" - It's a Small World
11. "I Won't Say (I'm in Love)" - Hercules
12. "Just Around the Riverbend" - Pocahontas
13. "One Jump Ahead" - Aladdin
14. "Little April Shower" - Bambi
15. "The Siamese Cat Song/What's Going on Down There" - Lady and the Tramp
16. "What's This?" - The Nightmare Before Christmas
17. "Yo Ho (A Pirate's Life for Me)" - Pirates of the Caribbean
18. "When Will My Life Begin?" - Tangled
19. "Scales and Arpeggios" - The Aristocats
20. "Mickey Mouse Club, Alma Mater" - The Mickey Mouse Club

=== Volume 3 ===
1. "Love Is an Open Door" - Frozen
2. "When Can I See You Again?" - Wreck-It Ralph
3. "Still I Fly" - Planes: Fire & Rescue
4. "Life's a Happy Song" - The Muppets
5. "Something There" - Beauty and the Beast
6. "Friend Like Me" - Aladdin
7. "Bibbidi-Bobbidi-Boo" - Cinderella
8. "Let's Go Fly a Kite" - Mary Poppins
9. "You'll Be in My Heart" - Tarzan
10. "The Climb" - Hannah Montana: The Movie
11. "I Just Can't Wait to Be King" - The Lion King
12. "I Thought I Lost You" - Bolt
13. "Something That I Want" - Tangled
14. "We're Doing a Sequel" - Muppets Most Wanted
15. "That's What Friends are For" - The Jungle Book
16. "Main Title/Cinderella" - Cinderella
17. "Les Poissons" - The Little Mermaid
18. "The Beautiful Briny" - Bedknobs and Broomsticks
19. "Down in New Orleans" - The Princess and the Frog
20. "You've Got a Friend in Me (Para el Buzz Español)" - Toy Story 3

== Reception ==
Professional ratings
Review scores
Source	Rating
AllMusic	4.5/5 stars
Daily Express	4/5 stars
music-news.com	4/5 stars

Reviews for the UK edition say it's "pretty hard not to love this album" and "a perfect Christmas treat for anyone with children, grandchildren or a sense of nostalgia".

In his review of the US version for Allmusic, John Bush claims that the album "is understandably heavy on films that came after Disney's '90s renaissance," but also says "the collection finds plenty of space for songs from the earlier generation of Disney classics."

== Charts ==
=== UK version ===
Chart (2011)	Peak position
UK Compilation Albums	3
UK Album Downloads	20

=== US version ===
Chart (2012)	Peak position
US Billboard 200	34
US Kid Albums (Billboard)	1

== Release history ==
Region	Date	Distributing label
United Kingdom	21 November 2011	EMI/Walt Disney
United Kingdom	19 November 2012	EMI/Walt Disney
United States	6 November 2012	Walt Disney
