= Now That's What I Call Country Volume 2 =

Compilation album by Various artists
- Released: August 25, 2009
- Recorded: 2007–2009
- Genre: Country
- Length: 73:03
- Label: Sony Music

Series chronology
Now That's What I Call the 80s 2 (2009)	Now That's What I Call Country Volume 2 (2009)	Now That's What I Call Club Hits (2009)

Country series chronology
Now That's What I Call Country (2008)	Now That's What I Call Country Volume 2 (2009)	Now That's What I Call Country Volume 3 (2010)

Professional ratings
Review scores
Source	Rating
Allmusic	3/5 stars

Now That's What I Call Country Volume 2 is the second country music compilation album from the (U.S.) Now! series, released on August 25, 2009.

The track lineup includes nine songs that topped the Billboard Hot Country Songs chart during 2008 and 2009, including songs from Kenny Chesney, Taylor Swift, Rascal Flatts, Montgomery Gentry, Alan Jackson, Sugarland, Darius Rucker, Dierks Bentley and Lady Antebellum.

== Track listing ==
No.	Title	Artist	Length
1.	"Kiss a Girl"	Keith Urban	3:45
2.	"Everybody Wants to Go to Heaven"	Kenny Chesney	4:17
3.	"Love Story"	Taylor Swift	3:53
4.	"Here"	Rascal Flatts	3:53
5.	"Roll with Me"	Montgomery Gentry	3:52
6.	"Marry for Money"	Trace Adkins	3:01
7.	"I Told You So"	Carrie Underwood	4:16
8.	"Country Boy"	Alan Jackson	4:02
9.	"Everything Is Fine"	Josh Turner	3:33
10.	"All I Want to Do"	Sugarland	3:29
11.	"Gunpowder & Lead"	Miranda Lambert	3:08
12.	"Learning How to Bend"	Gary Allan	3:24
13.	"In Color"	Jamey Johnson	4:51
14.	"It Won't Be Like This for Long"	Darius Rucker	3:36
15.	"Sideways"	Dierks Bentley	3:02
16.	"Don't Think I Can't Love You"	Jake Owen	3:04
17.	"Love Your Love the Most"	Eric Church	2:48
18.	"Don't"	Billy Currington	3:55
19.	"I Run to You"	Lady Antebellum	4:14
20.	"Troubadour"	George Strait	2:54
21.	"God Love Her"	Toby Keith	3:37
22.	"She Wouldn't Be Gone"	Blake Shelton	3:35
23.	"Big Green Tractor"	Jason Aldean	3:24
24.	"Then"	Brad Paisley	4:16
25.	"Indian Summer"	Brooks & Dunn	4:22

== Charts ==
=== Weekly charts ===
Chart (2009)	Peak position
US Billboard 200	10
US Top Country Albums (Billboard)	4

=== Year-end charts ===
Chart (2009)	Position
US Top Country Albums (Billboard)	42
