= Now That's What I Call Country Volume 5 =

Compilation album by Various artists
- Released: June 12, 2012
- Genre: Country
- Length: 66:13
- Label: Universal Music

Series chronology
| Now That's What I Call Classic Rock Hits (2012) | Now That's What I Call Country Volume 5 (2012) | Now That's What I Call British (2012) |

Country series chronology
| Now That's What I Call Country Ballads (2012) | Now That's What I Call Country Volume 5 (2012) | Now That's What I Call a Country Party (2013) |

Now That's What I Call Country Volume 5 is an album from the Now! series released in the United States on June 12, 2012.

== Critical reception ==
Professional ratings
Review scores
| Source | Rating |
|---|---|
| Allmusic | 3/5 stars |

Steve Leggett of Allmusic says the fifth installment in the Now That's What I Call Country series "provides a pretty accurate template of contemporary country music on the airwaves a decade and some change into the 21st century."

== Track listing ==
| No. | Title | Artist | Length |
|---|---|---|---|
| 1. | "Red Solo Cup" | Toby Keith | 3:43 |
| 2. | "Drink in My Hand" | Eric Church | 3:11 |
| 3. | "I Don't Want This Night to End" | Luke Bryan | 3:39 |
| 4. | "Alone with You" | Jake Owen | 3:02 |
| 5. | "God Gave Me You" | Blake Shelton | 3:49 |
| 6. | "Hello" | Lionel Richie with Jennifer Nettles | 4:29 |
| 7. | "Just a Kiss" | Lady Antebellum | 3:38 |
| 8. | "Crazy Girl" | Eli Young Band | 3:26 |
| 9. | "Sparks Fly" | Taylor Swift | 4:21 |
| 10. | "Baggage Claim" | Miranda Lambert | 3:16 |
| 11. | "Banjo" | Rascal Flatts | 3:44 |
| 12. | "You Gonna Fly" | Keith Urban | 3:35 |
| 13. | "All Your Life" | The Band Perry | 3:50 |
| 14. | "Old Alabama" | Brad Paisley featuring Alabama | 4:12 |
| 15. | "Country Must Be Country Wide" | Brantley Gilbert | 3:34 |
| 16. | "Let It Rain" | David Nail | 3:42 |
| 17. | "You" | Chris Young | 2:43 |
| 18. | "Home" | Dierks Bentley | 3:58 |
| Total length: | | | 66:13 |

== Charts ==
=== Weekly charts ===
| Chart (2012) | Peak position |
|---|---|
| US Billboard 200 | 13 |
| US Top Country Albums (Billboard) | 4 |

=== Year-end charts ===
| Chart (2012) | Position |
|---|---|
| US Billboard 200 | 178 |
| US Top Country Albums (Billboard) | 35 |

| Chart (2013) | Position |
|---|---|
| US Top Country Albums (Billboard) | 48 |
