= Now That's What I Call Country Volume 3 =

Compilation album by Various artists
- Released: September 14, 2010
- Recorded: 2007–2010
- Genre: Country
- Length: 59:33
- Label: Capitol

Series chronology
Now That's What I Call Music! 35 (2010)	Now That's What I Call Country Volume 3 (2010)	Now That's What I Call Club Hits 2 (2010)

Country series chronology
Now That's What I Call Country Volume 2 (2009)	Now That's What I Call Country Volume 3 (2010)	Now That's What I Call Country Volume 4 (2011)

Professional ratings
Review scores
Source	Rating
Allmusic	3/5 stars

Now That's What I Call Country Volume 3 is an album from the (US) Now! series released on September 14, 2010.

== Track listing ==
No.	Title	Artist	Length
1.	"Ain't Back Yet"	Kenny Chesney	3:58
2.	"Our Kind of Love"	Lady Antebellum	4:08
3.	"Why Don't We Just Dance"	Josh Turner	3:12
4.	"Highway 20 Ride"	Zac Brown Band	3:52
5.	"American Saturday Night"	Brad Paisley	4:33
6.	"Unstoppable"	Rascal Flatts	3:50
7.	"'Til Summer Comes Around"	Keith Urban	5:32
8.	"I Gotta Get to You"	George Strait	3:10
9.	"Crazy Town"	Jason Aldean	3:04
10.	"The Man I Want to Be"	Chris Young	3:28
11.	"Rain Is a Good Thing"	Luke Bryan	2:55
12.	"A Little More Country Than That"	Easton Corbin	2:53
13.	"Wrong Baby Wrong Baby Wrong"	Martina McBride	3:42
14.	"Up on the Ridge"	Dierks Bentley	3:34
15.	"Little White Church"	Little Big Town	3:07
16.	"Get Off on the Pain"	Gary Allan	3:55

== Charts ==
=== Weekly charts ===
Chart (2010)	Peak position
US Billboard 200	22
US Top Country Albums (Billboard)	3

=== Year-end charts ===
Chart (2010)	Position
US Top Country Albums (Billboard)	69
Chart (2011)	Position
US Top Country Albums (Billboard)	61
