= Now That's What I Call Music! 32 (American series) =

Compilation album by various artists
- Released: November 3, 2009
- Length: 78:51
- Label: Sony

Series chronology
Now That's What I Call Music! 31 (2009)	Now That's What I Call Music! 32 (2009)	Now That's What I Call Music! 33 (2010)

Now That's What I Call Music! 32 was released on November 3, 2009. The album is the 32nd edition of the (U.S.) Now! series. For the first time, the series includes a track by an artist as part of its "What's Next New Music Preview" feature, Katharine McPhee's "Had It All".

Now 32 debuted at number five on the Billboard 200 with nearly 102,000 copies sold. As of the week ending June 6, 2010, the album has sold 908,000 copies.

== Track listing ==
No.	Title	Artist	Length
1.	"I Gotta Feeling"	The Black Eyed Peas	4:03
2.	"LoveGame"	Lady Gaga	3:35
3.	"Down"	Jay Sean featuring Lil Wayne	3:27
4.	"Best I Ever Had"	Drake	4:15
5.	"Obsessed"	Mariah Carey	3:56
6.	"Whatcha Say"	Jason Derulo	3:39
7.	"Knock You Down"	Keri Hilson featuring Kanye West and Ne-Yo	4:10
8.	"Throw It in the Bag"	Fabolous featuring The-Dream	3:50
9.	"Hotel Room Service"	Pitbull	3:57
10.	"Say Hey (I Love You)"	Michael Franti & Spearhead featuring Cherine Anderson	3:37
11.	"She Wolf"	Shakira	3:05
12.	"Sexy Chick"	David Guetta featuring Akon	3:12
13.	"Battlefield"	Jordin Sparks	3:57
14.	"Already Gone"	Kelly Clarkson	4:37
15.	"No Surprise"	Daughtry	4:08
16.	"Love Drunk"	Boys Like Girls	3:41
17.	"Good Girls Go Bad"	Cobra Starship featuring Leighton Meester	3:15
18.	"Waking Up in Vegas"	Katy Perry	3:17
19.	"You Belong with Me"	Taylor Swift	3:47
20.	"Only You Can Love Me This Way"	Keith Urban	4:07
21.	"Had It All"	Katharine McPhee	3:04

== Downloadable content ==
Now! 32 offered free downloadable MP3s through November 4, 2010, for those purchasing the CD. Included in this volume are the following artists and songs:

1. The Cataracs – "Club Love"
2. Tyrone Wells – "More"
3. Hedley – "Don't Talk to Strangers"
4. Ron Pope – "A Drop in the Ocean"
5. Black Dada – "Imma Zoe"
6. Erik Hassle – "Hurtful" (Acoustic)
7. Lolene – "Sexy People"
8. Jaicko – "Oh Yeah"

== Charts ==
=== Weekly charts ===
Chart (2009)	Peak position
US Billboard 200	5

=== Year-end charts ===
Chart (2009)	Position
US Billboard 200	182
Chart (2010)	Position
US Billboard 200	30
