= Now That's What I Call Music! 39 (American series) =

Compilation album by various artists
- Released: August 9, 2011
- Length: 73:03
- Label: EMI

Numbered series chronology
| Now That's What I Call Music! 38 (2011) | Now That's What I Call Music! 39 (2011) | Now That's What I Call Music! 40 (2011) |

Now That's What I Call Music! 39 was released on August 9, 2011. The album is the 39th edition of the Now! series in the United States. Three tracks on the album, "Last Friday Night (T.G.I.F.)", "Party Rock Anthem" and "Give Me Everything", reached number one on the Billboard Hot 100.

Now! 39 debuted on the Billboard 200 at number three with first week sales of 110,000 copies. The album has sold 591,000 copies as of March 2012.

== Track listing ==
| No. | Title | Artist | Length |
|---|---|---|---|
| 1. | "Last Friday Night (T.G.I.F.)" | Katy Perry | 3:50 |
| 2. | "Party Rock Anthem" | LMFAO featuring Lauren Bennett and GoonRock | 3:51 |
| 3. | "Give Me Everything" | Pitbull featuring Ne-Yo, Afrojack and Nayer | 4:12 |
| 4. | "The Edge of Glory" | Lady Gaga | 4:19 |
| 5. | "Till the World Ends" | Britney Spears | 3:54 |
| 6. | "On the Floor" | Jennifer Lopez featuring Pitbull | 3:47 |
| 7. | "The Show Goes On" | Lupe Fiasco | 3:54 |
| 8. | "Written in the Stars" | Tinie Tempah featuring Eric Turner | 3:25 |
| 9. | "Just Can't Get Enough" | The Black Eyed Peas | 3:39 |
| 10. | "The Lazy Song" | Bruno Mars | 3:07 |
| 11. | "Who Says" | Selena Gomez & the Scene | 3:09 |
| 12. | "Price Tag" | Jessie J featuring B.o.B | 3:17 |
| 13. | "Tonight Tonight" | Hot Chelle Rae | 3:18 |
| 14. | "Good Life" | OneRepublic | 4:09 |
| 15. | "Dirt Road Anthem" | Jason Aldean | 3:45 |
| 16. | "Honey Bee" | Blake Shelton | 3:39 |
| 17. | "Starbucks Smile" | Maria K. | 3:24 |
| 18. | "Show Me" | Jessica Sutta | 3:42 |
| 19. | "Mind Your Manners" | Chiddy Bang featuring Icona Pop | 3:14 |
| 20. | "Bass Down Low" | Dev featuring The Cataracs | 3:29 |

== Reception ==
Professional ratings
Review scores
| Source | Rating |
|---|---|
| Allmusic | 2.5/5 stars |

Allmusic reviewer Andy Kellman tells readers that while Now! 39 includes "hyper-energetic party songs" and two songs from solo male country artists (ending a three-volume drought), what is "notable is the absence of songs that could be squarely categorized as rap or R&B." He also points out of the bizarre repeat of "Tonight, Tonight" for the second volume in a row and the peculiar inclusion of "Bass Down Low" among the Now What's Next selections as it "hit the Hot 100 the last week of 2010".

== Charts ==
=== Weekly charts ===
| Chart (2011) | Peak position |
|---|---|
| US Billboard 200 | 3 |

=== Year-end charts ===
| Chart (2011) | Position |
|---|---|
| US Billboard 200 | 64 |
