= Now That's What I Call Music! discography =

Compilation album series by various artists

Now That's What I Call Music!
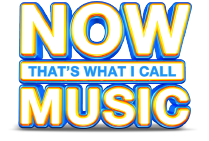
- This logo format has been used on numbered releases since Now That's What I Call Music! 20, first released in November 1991.

Compilation album series by various artists
- Released: 28 November 1983
- Genre: Various artists
- Labels: Universal Music Group, Sony Music

This is a list of available physical albums belonging to the official 1983 Now That's What I Call Music! UK series, comprising compact discs (CD), magnetic audio cassettes (AC), vinyl (LP), VHS tape, DVD and other short-lived formats. They are categorized by series (country), then ordered by date. All countries but the United Kingdom have discontinued their respective series.

== United Kingdom and Ireland ==
The evolution of Now That's What I Call Music! in the UK reflects the changing landscape of music consumption formats. Starting with vinyl and magnetic audio cassettes, the series adapted to the rise of compact discs (CDs) and explored various formats like DVDs, MiniDiscs, and videos.

=== Music formats ===
The initial releases of Now That's What I Call Music! in the UK and Ireland were exclusively on vinyl magnetic audio cassette and laserdisc.

==== Compact discs (CD) ====
- The series transitioned to CD with the release of Now That's What I Call Music 4 in a single-CD format in 1984.
- Subsequent single-CD versions, such as Now That's What I Call Music 8 and Now That's What I Call Music 9, followed.
- Double-CD releases commenced with Now That's What I Call Music 10 in November 1987.

==== Phonograph records ====
- Phonograph record production concluded with Now That's What I Call Music! 35 in November 1996.
- Special vinyl editions like Now That's What I Call Punk and New Wave emerged in the 21st century.

==== Magnetic audio cassettes ====
- Magnetic audio cassettes ended with Now That's What I Call Music! 64 in July 2006.

==== MiniDiscs ====
- The MiniDisc format inclusion began with Now That's What I Call Music! 43 in July 1999, and concluded in April 2001 with Now That's What I Call Music! 48.

==== NTWICM DVD/VHS ====
- Now That's What I Call Music! UK volumes 1 through 18 and Now That's What I Call Music! 20 were individually released on VHS tapes.
- The first two albums were also issued on LaserDiscs.
- From 2001 to 2007, videos transitioned to DVD, with an annual release.
- DVDs are numbered by year, unrelated to album numbers.
- Now 2006 was released on UMD as well as DVD.

=== Release dates ===
The release dates mentioned pertain to the United Kingdom. Until the release of Now That's What I Call Music! 90 on 30 March 2015, the release date in Ireland preceded the UK release by 3 days.

However, starting with Now That's What I Call Music! 91 on 24 July 2015, the release dates in the United Kingdom and Ireland have been simultaneous, aligning with the Global Release Day campaign by IFPI, effective from 10 July 2015.

Volume	Release date	Peak chart positions		Certification
Volume	Release date	UK Albums	UK Compilations	Certification
1	28 November 1983	1	2 (2018)	3× Platinum
2	26 March 1984	1	2 (2019)	2× Platinum
3	30 July 1984	1	2 (2019)	2× Platinum
4	26 November 1984	2	4 (2019)	Platinum
5	5 August 1985	1	2 (2020)	2× Platinum
6	25 November 1985	1	2 (2020)	4× Platinum
7	11 August 1986	1	4 (2020)	2× Platinum
8	24 November 1986	1	2 (2021)	4× Platinum
9	23 March 1987	1	2 (2021)	2× Platinum
10	23 November 1987	1	4 (2021)	4× Platinum
11	21 March 1988	1	3 (2022)	2× Platinum
12	11 July 1988	1	2 (2022)	2× Platinum
13	21 November 1988	1	1 (1989)	4× Platinum
14	20 March 1989	—	1 (1989)	2× Platinum
15	14 August 1989	—	1 (1989)	Platinum
16	20 November 1989	—	1 (1989)	3× Platinum
17	23 April 1990	—	1 (1990)	Platinum
18	19 November 1990	—	1 (1990)	3× Platinum
19	25 March 1991	—	1	Platinum
20	18 November 1991	—	1	3× Platinum
21	13 April 1992	—	1	Platinum
22	27 July 1992	—	1	Platinum
23	16 November 1992	—	1	3× Platinum
24	26 April 1993	—	1	Platinum
25	2 August 1993	—	1	Platinum
26	15 November 1993	—	1	3× Platinum
27	28 March 1994	—	1	Platinum
28	1 August 1994	—	1	2× Platinum
29	14 November 1994	—	1	5× Platinum
30	10 April 1995	—	1	2× Platinum
31	31 July 1995	—	1	2× Platinum
32	13 November 1995	—	1	4× Platinum
33	18 March 1996	—	1	2× Platinum
34	12 August 1996	—	1	3× Platinum
35	18 November 1996	—	1	5× Platinum
36	24 March 1997	—	1	2× Platinum
37	14 July 1997	—	1	2× Platinum
38	17 November 1997	—	1	3× Platinum
39	6 April 1998	—	1	2× Platinum
40	3 August 1998	—	1	3× Platinum
41	23 November 1998	—	1	5× Platinum
42	29 March 1999	—	1	3× Platinum
43	19 July 1999	—	1	3× Platinum
44	22 November 1999	—	1	7× Platinum
45	17 April 2000	—	1	3× Platinum
46	24 July 2000	—	1	3× Platinum
47	20 November 2000	—	1	6× Platinum
48	9 April 2001	—	1	3× Platinum
49	30 July 2001	—	1	3× Platinum
50	19 November 2001	—	1	6× Platinum
51	25 March 2002	—	1	3× Platinum
52	22 July 2002	—	1	3× Platinum
53	18 November 2002	—	1	4× Platinum
54	14 April 2003	—	1	2× Platinum
55	21 July 2003	—	1	2× Platinum
56	17 November 2003	—	1	5× Platinum
57	5 April 2004	—	1	3× Platinum
58	26 July 2004	—	1	3× Platinum
59	15 November 2004	—	1	4× Platinum
60	21 March 2005	—	1	3× Platinum
61	25 July 2005	—	1	2× Platinum
62	21 November 2005	—	1	4× Platinum
63	10 April 2006	—	1	2× Platinum
64	24 July 2006	—	1	2× Platinum
65	20 November 2006	—	1	3× Platinum
66	2 April 2007	—	1	3× Platinum
67	23 July 2007	—	1	2× Platinum
68	19 November 2007	—	1	4× Platinum
69	17 March 2008	—	1	3× Platinum
70	21 July 2008	—	1	3× Platinum
71	17 November 2008	—	1	3× Platinum
72	6 April 2009	—	1	2× Platinum
73	20 July 2009	—	1	2× Platinum
74	23 November 2009	—	1	3× Platinum
75	29 March 2010	—	1	2× Platinum
76	19 July 2010	—	1	2× Platinum
77	22 November 2010	—	1	4× Platinum
78	11 April 2011	—	1	2× Platinum
79	25 July 2011	—	1	3× Platinum
80	21 November 2011	—	1	5× Platinum
81	2 April 2012	—	1	2× Platinum
82	23 July 2012	—	1	Platinum
83	19 November 2012	—	1	5× Platinum
84	25 March 2013	—	1	2× Platinum
85	22 July 2013	—	1	3× Platinum
86	18 November 2013	—	1	4× Platinum
87	7 April 2014	—	1	2× Platinum
88	21 July 2014	—	1	2× Platinum
89	24 November 2014	—	1	3× Platinum
90	30 March 2015	—	1	2× Platinum
91	24 July 2015	—	1	2× Platinum
92	20 November 2015	—	1	3× Platinum
93	18 March 2016	—	1	2× Platinum
94	22 July 2016	—	1	2× Platinum
95	18 November 2016	—	1	3× Platinum
96	7 April 2017	—	1	Platinum
97	21 July 2017	—	1	2× Platinum
98	17 November 2017	—	1	2× Platinum
99	23 March 2018	—	1	Platinum
100	20 July 2018	—	1	Platinum
101	23 November 2018	—	1	Platinum
102	12 April 2019	—	1	Gold
103	19 July 2019	—	1	Gold
104	8 November 2019	—	1	Gold
105	8 May 2020	—	1	Gold
106	24 July 2020	—	1	Gold
107	27 November 2020	—	1	Gold
108	26 March 2021	—	1	Gold
109	23 July 2021	—	1	Silver
110	19 November 2021	—	1	Gold
111	8 April 2022	—	1	Silver
112	29 July 2022	—	1	Silver
113	18 November 2022	—	1	Silver
114	14 April 2023	—	1	—
115	28 July 2023	—	2	—
116	17 November 2023	—	1	—
117	5 April 2024	—	1	—
118	26 July 2024	—	1	—
119	15 November 2024	—	1	—
120	4 April 2025	—	1	—
121	25 July 2025	—	2	—
122	14 November 2025	—	2	—
123	17 April 2026	—	1	—
124	31 July 2026	—	1	—
125	13 November 2026	—	1	—

=== Now re-issues of the original UK numbered series (2018–2024) ===
For the 25th anniversary of Now in 2009 and the release of Now 100 in summer 2018, the first Now album was re-compiled and re-issued. From the release of Now 102 in 2019 until Now 118 in 2024, the corresponding Now album from 100 volumes prior would be re-compiled and re-issued on double-CD sets on the same day. Due to licensing issues, these re-compiled versions sometimes use alternative mixes, such as album versions. Sometimes, tracks are missing where it has not been possible to license the song.

1. Now That's What I Call Music (first reissued 2009 for the 25th anniversary, then again on 20 July 2018 to coincide with Now 100) re-issued on 2-CD (gatefold in 2009, jewel case in 2018), magnetic audio cassette, and a 2-LP vinyl release. All 30 tracks are included.
2. Now That's What I Call Music II (2) (12 April 2019) re-issued on 2-CD and a 2-LP vinyl release; all 30 tracks are included.
3. Now That's What I Call Music 3 (19 July 2019) re-issued on 2-CD - 28 tracks; "One Love/People Get Ready" by Bob Marley and the Wailers and "Dance Me Up" by Gary Glitter are omitted.
4. Now That's What I Call Music 4 (8 November 2019) originally a 15 track CD in 1984, now with all 32 tracks included.
5. Now That's What I Call Music 5 (8 May 2020) re-issued on 2-CD - 29 tracks; "This is Not America" by David Bowie and Pat Metheny Group is omitted.
6. Now That's What I Call Music 6 (24 July 2020) re-issued on 2-CD - 29 tracks; "It's Only Love" by Bryan Adams and Tina Turner is omitted.
7. Now That's What I Call Music 7 (27 November 2020) re-issued on 2-CD - 30 tracks; "Absolute Beginners by David Bowie, "Bang Zoom (Let's Go Go)" by The Real Roxanne and Hitman Howie Tee, and "On My Own" by Patti LaBelle and Michael McDonald are omitted.
8. Now That's What I Call Music 8 (26 March 2021) originally a 17 track CD in 1986, now with all 32 tracks included.
9. Now That's What I Call Music 9 (23 July 2021) originally a 16 track CD in 1987, now with all 30 tracks included.
10. Now That's What I Call Music 10 (19 November 2021) 28 tracks; "Alone" by Heart and "Here I Go Again" by Whitesnake are omitted.
11. Now That's What I Call Music 11 (8 April 2022) 28 tracks; "Gimme Hope Jo'anna" by Eddy Grant and "Give Me All Your Love" by Whitesnake are omitted.
12. Now That's What I Call Music 12 (29 July 2022) 31 tracks; "In the Air Tonight ('88 Remix)" by Phil Collins is omitted.
13. Now That's What I Call Music XIII (13) (18 November 2022) 31 tracks; "A Groovy Kind of Love" by Phil Collins is omitted.
14. Now That's What I Call Music 14 (14 April 2023) 30 tracks; "Two Hearts" by Phil Collins and "Need You Tonight" by INXS are omitted.
15. Now That's What I Call Music 15 (28 July 2023) 31 tracks; "Mystify" by INXS is omitted.
16. Now That's What I Call Music 16 (17 November 2023) 33 tracks; "The Sensual World" by Kate Bush, as well as the CD-exclusive track "French Kiss" by Lil Louis, are omitted.
17. Now That's What I Call Music 17 (5 April 2024) 29 tracks; "Dub Be Good to Me" by Beats International, "I Wish It Would Rain Down" by Phil Collins, and "Enjoy the Silence" by Depeche Mode are omitted.
18. Now! That's What I Call Music 18 (26 July 2024) 28 tracks; "The Joker" by Steve Miller Band, "Something Happened on the Way to Heaven" by Phil Collins, "Suicide Blonde" by INXS, and "Fascinating Rhythm" by Bassomatic are omitted.

=== Now Dance series (1985–2023) ===
The original Now Dance series began in 1985 and has been released in a variety of titles, formats, and release frequency. Originally, the series captured extended 12" mixes of dance hits of the time, but from 1991 onwards, all Now Dance compilations featured 7" edits with only occasional extended versions or mixes included. The first two volumes were not released on compact disc, and all subsequent releases were either single-, double-, or triple-disc sets. Unlike the main series, Now Dance were originally titled and numbered by their year of release (i.e. Now Dance '89). The frequency with which they were released also varied from year to year; initially, and most frequently across the series, there would be one Now Dance volume per year, but in 1994 for example, four volumes were released, and in 1996, no Now Dance compilations were released. Towards the end of the series, 3-CD digipak sets were issued, but in 2010, the long-running title was retired, and all subsequent dance-themed Now collections have been issued under the Special Editions series.

In 2021, the original concept of Now Dance was revived with a new series of compilations containing 12" remixes released under the title Now That's What I Call 12" 80s.

In February 2023, 12" mixes all taken from the first three Now Dance compilations, originally released in 1985, 1986 and 1989, were collected on a special 4CD and 3-LP set, Now Dance: The 80s, with artwork inspired by the original Now Dance 86. Fourteen mixes were taken from Now Dance, eighteen mixes were lifted from 86, and sixteen from 89.

1. Now Dance - Extended Dance Versions of 20 Smash Hits (The 12" Mixes) (20 May 1985) 2-LP/MC only. Partially re-issued in 2023 on CD/LP.
2. Now Dance 86 - 20 Smash Dance Hits of the Year (The 12" Mixes) (27 October 1986) 2-LP/MC only. Partially re-issued in 2023 on CD/LP.
3. Now Dance 89 - 20 Smash Dance Hits (The 12" Mixes) (3 July 1989) 2-LP/MC/CD. Partially re-issued in 2023 on CD/LP.
4. Now Dance 901 - 20 Smash Dance Hits (The 12" Mixes) (6 February 1990) 2-LP/MC/CD
5. Now Dance 902 (The 12" Mixes) (16 July 1990) 2-LP/MC/CD
6. Now Dance 903 (The 12" Mixes) (29 October 1990) 2-LP/MC/CD
7. Now Dance 91 - 20 Blissful Grooves (23 September 1991) Single LP/MC/CD
8. Now Dance 92 (2 November 1992) Uniquely, 2-LP/2-MC/CD* with 12" mixes,*single CD with abridged track listing and 7" edits
9. Now Dance 93 - 20 Buzzin' Beats (14 June 1993) Single CD/MC
10. Now Dance - The Best of 93 (18 October 1993) 2-LP/2-CD/MC
11. Now Dance 94 (17 January 1994) LP/CD/MC
12. Now Dance 94 - Volume 2 (7 March 1994) CD/MC
13. Now Dance Summer 94 (16 June 1994) 2-CD/MC
14. Now Dance - The Best of 94 (3 November 1994) 2-CD/MC
15. Now Dance 95 - 40 Ultimate Dance Hits (20 March 1995) 2-CD/MC
16. Now Dance Summer 95 (27 July 1995) Single CD/MC
17. Now Dance 97 (20 October 1997) 2-CD/MC
18. Now Dance 98 (2 November 1998) 2-CD/MC
19. Now Dance 2000 (18 October 1999) 2-CD/MC
20. Now Dance 2001 (23 October 2000) 2-CD/MC
21. Now Dance 2001 - Part Two (19 March 2001) 2-CD
22. Now Dance 2002 (22 October 2001) 2-CD
23. Now Dance 2002 - Part Two (4 March 2002) 2-CD
24. Now Dance 2003 (14 October 2002) 2-CD
25. Now Dance 2003 - Part Two (31 March 2003) 2-CD
26. Now Dance 2004 (27 October 2003) 2-CD
27. Now Dance - 41 Brand New Dance Hits (22 March 2004) 2-CD
28. Now Dance - 42 Brand New Dance Hits (18 October 2004) 2-CD
29. The Very Best of Now Dance (26 September 2005) 3-CD
30. Now Dance 2007 (16 October 2006) 2-CD
31. Now Dance 2008 (15 October 2007) 2-CD
32. Now Dance Anthems (21 September 2009) Released in association with Ministry of Sound. 3-CD
33. The Very Best of Now Dance 2010 (18 October 2010) 3-CD
34. The Very Best of Now Dance (8 December 2014) 3-CD
35. Now Dance: The 80s (17 February 2023) 4-CD and 3-LP red vinyl selection

=== Christmas series (1985–present) ===
Title	Release date	Formats	Certification
Now - The Christmas Album	18 November 1985	LP/1 MC/CD	4x Platinum
Now! - The Christmas Album	27 November 2000	2-CD/2-MC	Platinum
Now Xmas - Massive Christmas Hits	14 November 2005	CD	
Now That's What I Call Xmas	20 November 2006	CD	Gold
Now That's What I Call Xmas	8 November 2010	CD	
Now That's What I Call Christmas	5 November 2012	CD	
Now That's What I Call Christmas	4 November 2013	CD	
Now That's What I Call Christmas	6 November 2015	CD	7x Platinum
Now - The Christmas Album (2016)	25 November 2016	LP	
Now That's What I Call Christmas	29 October 2021	3-CD and 3-LP beautiful white vinyl selection	
Now That's What I Call Christmas	28 October 2022	4-CD and 3-LP beautiful red vinyl selection	Silver
Now That's What I Call Christmas	1 November 2024	4-CD and 3-LP beautiful green vinyl selection	

=== Special Editions (1986–present) ===
The Special Editions series, a significant facet of the Now That's What I Call Music! legacy, encompasses a diverse array of collections marking Now anniversaries. These editions span various music genres, eras, and decades, featuring collaborations with entities such as Smash Hits, Disney, Eurovision, HMV, and the Official Charts Company.

Year	Special Edition Title	Description
1986	—	The special edition concept was relatively rare during this period.
1994–2002	—	No special editions were released during these years.
2003–2010	Annual releases covering decades	One special edition released each year, focusing on specific decades ('80s, '90s, '00s) or a cross section of big hits celebrating the Now series (Now Decades, Now Years, Now Dance).
2011–2016	Increased frequency	Special editions became more frequent, showcasing diverse themes and compilations.
2017	Fifteen different titles	A notable increase in output with fifteen distinct titles released in this year.
2018	Transition with Now 100 Hits acquisition	The Now team took over the 100 Hits brand from Demon Music Group, marking a significant transition. This also tied in with the regular numbered releases reaching Now 100.
2019–2020	Now 100 Hits dominance	The Special Editions series was effectively rested, allowing for the release of 24 Now 100 Hits compilations in quick succession.
January 2021–present	Resumption with variations	The Special Editions series resumed with reduced output, alongside the introduction of two new series, Now Yearbook and the 4-CD series. Reissues of the original Now That's What I Call Music! series (stopped at Now! That's What I Call Music 18, released on 26 July 2024).

1. Now That's What I Call Music – The Summer Album (6 July 1986) 2-LP/MC
2. Now That's What I Call Music '86 (27 October 1986) Single-CD only
3. Now That's What I Call Music Smash Hits (3 October 1987) 2-CD/LP/MC/VHS. Released in association with Smash Hits magazine.
4. Now That's What I Call Love (5 February 1994) Single-CD/MC
5. Now That's What I Call Music! Decades - The Deluxe Edition (29 September 2003) 3-CD. released to celebrate the 20th anniversary of Now.
6. Now That's What I Call Music Years (27 September 2004) 3-CD released to celebrate the 21st anniversary of Now.
7. Now That's What I Call No.1's (30 October 2006) 3-CD
8. Now That's What I Call the 80s (29 October 2007) 3-CD
9. Now That's What I Call Music! 25 Years (27 October 2008) 3-CD released to celebrate the 25th anniversary of Now.
10. Now That's What I Call the 90s (26 October 2009) 3-CD
11. Now That's What I Call the 00s (15 February 2010) 3-CD
12. Now That's What I Call a Wedding! (18 April 2011) 3-CD
13. Now That's What I Call R&B (26 September 2011) 2-CD
14. Now That's What I Call Disney (21 November 2011) 3-CD released in association with Disney
15. Now That's What I Call Classical (28 November 2011) 2-CD. released in association with Decca Records.
16. Now That's What I Call Love 2012 (30 January 2012) 2-CD
17. Now That's What I Call Running (5 March 2012) 3-CD, BPI: Platinum
18. Now That's What I Call Britain (21 May 2012) 2-CD
19. Now That's What I Call Reggae (25 June 2012) 3-CD
20. Now That's What I Call a No.1 (9 July 2012) 3-CD released in association with the Official Charts Company to celebrate 60 years of the official UK singles chart.
21. Now That's What I Call Chill (20 August 2012) 2-CD
22. Now That's What I Call 90s Dance (29 October 2012) 3-CD
23. Now That's What I Call Disney 2012 (2012 edition with one bonus CD) (November 2012) released in association with Disney
24. Now That's What I Call Musicals (26 November 2012) 2-CD
25. Now That's What I Call 30 Years (27 May 2013) 3-CD released to celebrate the 30th anniversary of Now.
26. Now That's What I Call Disco (26 August 2013) 3-CD
27. Now That's What I Call 80s Dance (14 October 2013) 3-CD
28. Now That's What I Call Music! USA (21 October 2013) 3-CD
29. Now That's What I Call Disney Princess (28 October 2013) 2-CD released in association with Disney
30. Now That's What I Call Movies (11 November 2013) 3-CD
31. Now That's What I Call Relaxing Classical (25 November 2013) 2-CD released in association with Decca Records.
32. Now That's What I Call Club Hits (9 December 2013) 3-CD
33. Now That's What I Call Running 2014 (10 March 2014) 3-CD, BPI: Gold
34. Now That's What I Call Feel Good (17 March 2014) 3-CD
35. Now That's What I Call 21st Century (21 April 2014) 3-CD
36. Now That's What I Call Rock (2 June 2014)
37. Now That's What I Call Summer (23 June 2014) 3-CD
38. Now That's What I Call Chilled (18 August 2014) 3-CD
39. Now That's What I Call Club Hits 2014 (8 September 2014) 3-CD
40. Now That's What I Call Drive (15 September 2014) 3-CD
41. Now That's What I Call a Million (27 October 2014) 3-CD
42. Now That's What I Call Disney 2014 (10 November 2014) 4-CD released in association with Disney.
43. Now That's What I Call the 90s 2014 (17 November 2014) 3-CD
44. Now That's What I Call Legends (24 November 2014) 2-CD
45. Now That's What I Call Musicals (2014) (24 November 2014) 3-CD
46. Now That's What I Call a Party 2015 (1 December 2014) 3-CD
47. Now That's What I Call Power Ballads (26 January 2015) 3-CD
48. Now That's What I Call a Song (13 April 2015) 3-CD
49. Now That's What I Call Running 2015 (20 April 2015) 3-CD, BPI: Silver
50. Now That's What I Call Classic Rock (1 June 2015) 3-CD
51. Now That's What I Call a Summer Party (22 June 2015) 3-CD
52. Now That's What I Call House (21 August 2015) 3-CD
53. Now That's What I Call Pop (25 September 2015) 3-CD
54. Now That's What I Call a Singer (23 October 2015) 3-CD
55. Now That's What I Call the 80s 2015 (6 November 2015) 3-CD
56. Now That's What I Call Party Anthems (27 November 2015) 3-CD
57. Now That's What I Call Classical 2015 (27 November 2015) 3-CD
58. Now That's What I Call Brit Hits (25 March 2016) 3-CD
59. Now That's What I Call Fitness (22 April 2016) 3-CD
60. Now That's What I Call Rock Ballads (3 June 2016) 3-CD
61. Now That's What I Call Reggae Party (24 June 2016) 3-CD
62. Now That's What I Call Summer Hits (1 July 2016) 3-CD
63. Now That's What I Call Dance Hits (19 August 2016) 3-CD
64. Now That's What I Call Drivetime (16 September 2016) 3-CD
65. Now That's What I Call 20th Century (21 October 2016) 3-CD
66. Now That's What I Call No.1 Hits (11 November 2016) 3-CD
67. Now That's What I Call Love 2016 (18 November 2016) 3-CD
68. Now That's What I Call Disney Princess 2016 (25 November 2016) 3-CD released in association with Disney.
69. Now That's What I Call 70s (25 November 2016) 3-CD
70. Now That's What I Call Party Hits (2 December 2016) 3-CD
71. Now That's What I Call R&B 2017 (10 February 2017) 3-CD
72. Now That's What I Call Mum (3 March 2017)
73. Now That's What I Call Running 2017 (24 March 2017) 3-CD
74. Now That's What I Call Classic Soul (26 May 2017) 3-CD
75. Now That's What I Call Driving Rock (2 June 2017) 3-CD
76. Now That's What I Call a Summer Party 2017 (23 June 2017) 3-CD
77. Now That's What I Call Old Skool (4 August 2017) 3-CD
78. Now That's What I Call Sing (22 September 2017) 3-CD
79. Now That's What I Call a Million 2017 (13 October 2017)
80. Now That's What I Call Disney 2017 (3 November 2017) 4-CD released in association with Disney
81. Now That's What I Call the 00s - The Best of the Noughties: 2000-2009 (10 November 2017) 3-CD
82. Now That's What I Call 60s (17 November 2017) 3-CD
83. Now That's What I Call 80s Party (24 November 2017) 3-CD
84. Now That's What I Call Country (24 November 2017) 3-CD
85. Now That's What I Call a Party 2018 (1 December 2017) 3-CD
86. Now That's What I Call Remix (23 February 2018) 3-CD
87. Now That's What I Call Running 2018 (16 March 2018) 3-CD, BPI: Silver
88. Now That's What I Call Footie Anthems (25 May 2018) 3-CD
89. Now That's What I Call Dad Rock (1 June 2018) 3-CD, BPI: Silver
90. Now That's What I Call Jazz (1 June 2018) 3-CD
91. Now That's What I Call a Summer Party 2018 (22 June 2018) 3-CD
92. Now That's What I Call Ibiza (3 August 2018) 3-CD
93. Now That's What I Call Disney Bedtime (9 November 2018) 3-CD released in association with Disney.
94. Now That's What I Call Rock 'n' Roll (9 November 2018) 3-CD
95. Now That's What I Call Easy (16 November 2018) 3-CD
96. Now That's What I Call Love Songs (23 November 2018) 3-CD
97. Now That's What I Call a Party 2019 (30 November 2018) 3-CD
98. Now That's What I Call a Summer Party 2019 (28 June 2019) 3-CD
99. Now That's What I Call Eurovision Song Contest (30 April 2021) 3-CD - Reissued in 2022. Released in association with EBU.
100. Now That's What I Call Footie! Back of the Net (7 May 2021) 2-CD released to coincide with Euro 2020.
101. Now That's What I Call HMV (24 September 2021) 5-CD released to celebrate 100 years of HMV.
102. Now #1s (11 November 2022) 5-CD released in association with the Official Charts Company to "celebrate 70 years of the official UK singles chart".
103. Now That's What I Call Eurovision Song Contest (28 April 2023) 4-CD and 2-LP translucent red and translucent blue vinyl selection. Updated version. Released in association with EBU.
104. Now That's What I Call 40 Years (24 November 2023) 5-CD and 3-LP blue, white and violet vinyl selection. Released to celebrate the 40th anniversary of Now.
105. Now That's What I Call 40 Years Volume 1: 1983-1993 (24 November 2023) 3-CD and 3-LP white vinyl selection.
106. Now That's What I Call 40 Years Volume 2: 1993-2003 (24 November 2023) 3-CD and 3-LP red vinyl selection.
107. Now That's What I Call 40 Years Volume 3: 2003-2013 (24 November 2023) 3-CD and 3-LP blue vinyl selection.
108. Now That's What I Call 40 Years Volume 4: 2013-2023 (24 November 2023) 3-CD and 3-LP green vinyl selection.
109. Now That's What I Call 40 Years Part 2 (12 July 2024) 5-CD and 3-LP green, clear transparent and pink vinyl selection.
110. Now That's What I Call the 80s 2024 (6 September 2024) 5-CD and 3-LP red, blue and green vinyl selection.
111. Now That's What I Call... Pop! (23 May 2025) 2-CD and 3-LP bright yellow, hot pink and baby blue vinyl selection.
112. Now That's What I Call the 70s (30 May 2025) 5-CD and 3-LP orange, beige and brown vinyl selection.
113. Now Legends (13 November 2026) 5-CD and 3-LP super-silver vinyl selection

=== 10th Anniversary Series (1993–1995) ===
To commemorate ten years since the release of the first Now That's What I Call Music! album, from June to August in 1993, a series of ten, 40-track yearly collections were released on CD and cassette (but not vinyl), covering the years 1983 to 1992. The 1993 volume was not originally part of the ten-year anniversary series. This and two additional volumes were added in 1994 and 1995. These were all released on CD and magnetic cassette, with the 1993 and 1994 volumes also being released on vinyl.

1. Now That's What I Call Music! 1983 - 10th Anniversary Series (20 June 1993)
2. Now That's What I Call Music! 1984 - 10th Anniversary Series (27 June 1993)
3. Now That's What I Call Music! 1985 - 10th Anniversary Series (4 July 1993)
4. Now That's What I Call Music! 1986 - 10th Anniversary Series (11 July 1993)
5. Now That's What I Call Music! 1987 - 10th Anniversary Series (18 July 1993)
6. Now That's What I Call Music! 1988 - 10th Anniversary Series (25 July 1993)
7. Now That's What I Call Music! 1989 - 10th Anniversary Series (1 August 1993)
8. Now That's What I Call Music! 1990 - 10th Anniversary Series (8 August 1993)
9. Now That's What I Call Music! 1991 - 10th Anniversary Series (15 August 1993)
10. Now That's What I Call Music! 1992 - 10th Anniversary Series (22 August 1993)
11. Now That's What I Call Music! 1993 - 10th Anniversary Series (29 August 1993)
12. Now That's What I Call Music! 1994 - 10th Anniversary Series (13 September 1994)
13. Now That's What I Call Music! 1995 - 10th Anniversary Series (4 September 1995)

=== The Millennium Series (1999) ===
To commemorate the turn of the millennium, a series of twenty Now That's What I Call Music! collections were released in 1999 which all contained 36 tracks, and covered hits from the years 1980 to 1999. These compilations are similar to the anniversary series, but they contain fewer tracks and retailed for much less than the former series. The first sixteen volumes were released on the same date, and the final four issued four months later. They are the first time a Now series had released a compilation of hits from the years 1980 to 1982. An earlier compilation tie-in with Smash Hits from 1987 did, however, include tracks from those years. For the revamped series, see Now That's What I Call Music! discography#Now Millennium series (2023-2024).

1. Now That's What I Call Music! 1980 - The Millennium Series (21 June 1999)
2. Now That's What I Call Music! 1981 - The Millennium Series (21 June 1999)
3. Now That's What I Call Music! 1982 - The Millennium Series (21 June 1999)
4. Now That's What I Call Music! 1983 - The Millennium Series (21 June 1999)
5. Now That's What I Call Music! 1984 - The Millennium Series (21 June 1999)
6. Now That's What I Call Music! 1985 - The Millennium Series (21 June 1999)
7. Now That's What I Call Music! 1986 - The Millennium Series (21 June 1999)
8. Now That's What I Call Music! 1987 - The Millennium Series (21 June 1999)
9. Now That's What I Call Music! 1988 - The Millennium Series (21 June 1999)
10. Now That's What I Call Music! 1989 - The Millennium Series (21 June 1999)
11. Now That's What I Call Music! 1990 - The Millennium Series (21 June 1999)
12. Now That's What I Call Music! 1991 - The Millennium Series (21 June 1999)
13. Now That's What I Call Music! 1992 - The Millennium Series (21 June 1999)
14. Now That's What I Call Music! 1993 - The Millennium Series (21 June 1999)
15. Now That's What I Call Music! 1994 - The Millennium Series (21 June 1999)
16. Now That's What I Call Music! 1995 - The Millennium Series (21 June 1999)
17. Now That's What I Call Music! 1996 - The Millennium Series (4 October 1999)
18. Now That's What I Call Music! 1997 - The Millennium Series (4 October 1999)
19. Now That's What I Call Music! 1998 - The Millennium Series (4 October 1999)
20. Now That's What I Call Music! 1999 - The Millennium Series (4 October 1999)

=== DVD series (2001–2011) ===
1. Now That's What I Call Music! 2001 The DVD (10 December 2001)
2. Now That's What I Call Music! 2003 The DVD (2 December 2002)
3. Now That's What I Call Music! 2004 The DVD (1 December 2003)
4. Now That's What I Call Music! 2005 The DVD (22 November 2004)
5. Now That's What I Call Karaoke (21 November 2005)
6. Now Quiz - Now That's What I Call a Music Quiz [Interactive DVD] (5 December 2005)
7. Now That's What I Call Music! 2006 The DVD/The UMD (3 April 2006)
8. Now That's What I Call a Music Quiz 2 - Interactive DVD Game [Interactive DVD] (4 December 2006)
9. Now That's What I Call Music! 2008 The DVD (3 December 2007)
10. Now That's What I Call a Music Quiz - The 80s [Interactive DVD] (3 December 2007)
11. Now That's What I Call a Family Quiz [Interactive DVD] (1 December 2008)
12. Now That's What I Call Comedy (2 March 2009)
13. Now That's What I Call Fitness [Interactive DVD] (26 December 2011)

=== Now 100 Hits series (2018–2020) ===
Title	Release date	Certification
Now That's What I Call Now: 100 Hits from 100 Nows!	9 November 2018	
Now 100 Hits: The 80s	22 February 2019	Silver
Now 100 Hits: Power Ballads	29 March 2019	Silver
Now 100 Hits: Forgotten 80s	31 May 2019	Gold
Now 100 Hits: Classic Rock	7 June 2019	Silver
Now 100 Hits: Car Songs	12 July 2019	Silver
Now 100 Hits: The Movies	20 September 2019	
Now 100 Hits: Forgotten 90s	1 November 2019	
Now 100 Hits: Christmas 2019	8 November 2019	Silver
Now 100 Hits: Even More Forgotten 80s	15 November 2019	Silver
Now 100 Hits: Sing-a-Long	22 November 2019	Silver
Now 100 Hits: Forgotten 70s	29 November 2019	Silver
Now 100 Hits: Party	29 November 2019	Silver
Now 100 Hits: Country	13 March 2020	
Now 100 Hits: Forgotten 60s	27 March 2020	
Now 100 Hits: The 70s	12 June 2020	
Now 100 Hits: Summer	26 June 2020	
Now 100 Hits: Dance	18 September 2020	
Now 100 Hits: 80s No.1s	9 October 2020	
Now 100 Hits: The Decade (2010s)	23 October 2020	
Now 100 Hits: Christmas 2020	30 October 2020	Silver
Now 100 Hits: 90s No.1s	13 November 2020	
Now 100 Hits: The Legends	27 November 2020	
Now 100 Hits: 60s No.1s	27 November 2020	

=== 4-CD series (2021–present) ===
The 4-CD series follows the same general format of the original Special Editions series, with genre, era, and decade collections, but over four compact discs (there is also an abridged vinyl version of Punk and New Wave and Rock), meaning they contain more tracks than the original special editions, but fewer than the Now 100 Hits, which preceded this series. They are only issued in cardboard gatefold wallets, with a slot cut into each sleeve which stores the discs.

1. Now Decades of Love (22 January 2021)
2. Now 70s Glam Pop (29 January 2021)
3. Now That's What I Call Country 2021 (20 February 2021)
4. Now the 60s Girls: Then He Kissed Me (5 March 2021)
5. Now That's What I Call 12" 80s (16 April 2021)
6. Now Live Forever: The Anthems (28 May 2021)
7. Now That's What I Call Summer 2021 (25 June 2021)
8. Now That's What I Call Gold (16 July 2021)
9. Now Decades of Soul (13 August 2021)
10. Now That's What I Call 12" 80s: Extended (27 August 2021)
11. Now Boogie Nights: Disco Classics (17 September 2021)
12. Now That's What I Call Disney 2021 (1 October 2021)
13. Now That's What I Call Rock 2021 (5 November 2021)
14. Now That's What I Call a Massive Party (19 November 2021)
15. Now That's What I Call Electronic (7 January 2022)
16. Now That's What I Call Punk and New Wave (21 January 2022) 4-CD and 2-LP pink vinyl selection
17. Now That's What I Call 12" 80s: Remixed (25 February 2022)
18. Now That's What I Call 70s Pop (11 March 2022)
19. Now That's What I Call 80s: Dancefloor (22 April 2022)
20. Now That's What I Call Timeless... The Songs (27 May 2022)
21. Now That's What I Call Pride (17 June 2022)
22. Now That's What I Call a 60s and 70s Summer: Seasons in the Sun (24 June 2022)
23. Now That's What I Call Power Ballads: Total Eclipse of the Heart (12 August 2022)
24. Now That's What I Call 12" 70s (2 September 2022)
25. Now That's What I Call 90s: Dancefloor (14 October 2022)
26. Now That's What I Call a Massive 80s Party (11 November 2022)
27. Now That's What I Call a Love Song (27 January 2023)
28. Now That's What I Call 60s Pop (10 March 2023) 4-CD and 3-LP stunning white vinyl selection
29. Now That's What I Call Massive Hits and #1s (21 April 2023) 4-CD
30. Now That's What I Call Legendary (23 May 2023) 4-CD
31. Now 80s Alternative (16 June 2023) 4-CD and 2-LP stunning pink vinyl selection
32. Now That's What I Call a Sizzling Summer (30 June 2023) 4-CD
33. Now That's What I Call USA: The 80s (11 August 2023) 4-CD and 3-LP translucent blue, white and red vinyl selection
34. Now That's What I Call Pop Gold (10 November 2023) 4-CD and 3-LP fabulous neon pink, orange and yellow vinyl selection
35. Now That's What I Call Unforgettable (26 January 2024) 4-CD
36. Now That's What I Call Country 2024 (16 February 2024) 4-CD and 3-LP transparent orange vinyl selection
37. Now That's What I Call Jukebox Classics (15 March 2024) 4-CD
38. Now That's What I Call Rock Anthems (31 May 2024) 4-CD and 3-LP neon violet vinyl selection
39. Now That's What I Call a Summer Party 2024 (28 June 2024) 4-CD
40. Now That's What I Call a Massive 70s Party (22 November 2024) 4-CD
41. Now That's What I Call Gold: The Ultimate Hits (14 March 2025) 4-CD and 3-LP black vinyl selection
42. Now Presents...Clubland (28 March 2025) 4-CD
43. Now That's What I Call Jukebox Classics: True Love Ways (11 April 2025) 4-CD
44. Now That's What I Call 60s Soul (5 September 2025) 4-CD and 3-LP gorgeous red vinyl selection
45. Now That's What I Call the Ultimate Party (14 November 2025) 4-CD
46. Now That's What I Call Timeless - The Eternal Collection (30 January 2026) 4-CD and 3-LP stunning orange vinyl selection
47. Now That's What I Call 70s Soul (24 April 2026) 4-CD and 3-LP beautiful blue vinyl selection
48. Now That's What I Call Soft Rock & Power Pop Anthems (29 May 2026) 4-CD and 3-LP soft blue vinyl selection
49. Now That's What I Call an 80s Summer (12 June 2026) 4-CD selection

=== Now Yearbook series (2021–present) ===
The Yearbook series are 4-CD and 3-LP vinyl sets, each representing a year of music, which launched in June 2021. Each release has a tie-in block of programming on Now 80s. Each release is issued as a limited edition mini-hardback book, with the CDs in sleeves forming the pages of the 'yearbook' which contains an introductory overview of the year, original 7" single artwork, trivia, chart positions and a quiz. The limited edition 3-LP version is released on bright coloured vinyl. A standard 4-CD version is also issued in a gatefold "wallet" design, which retails cheaper than the mini-hardback books. The first collection focuses on hits from 1983, the birth year of the Now That's What I Call Music! series. The year 1984 followed, but after this, the series rewound its year of focus, issuing collections that went from 1982 and backwards into the late 1970s. A triple-CD only release, Yearbook Extra: The Collectors Edition, is issued a few weeks later; these include lesser known tracks and more songs by big artists included on the main album and they are released only in standard gatefold wallet packaging. A further release, The Final Chapter, a deluxe 4-CD and 3-LP set, was issued in December 2022, rounding off the Yearbook years 1980 to 1984. The same month, a deluxe 5-LP box set, Now Yearbook 1980-1984: Vinyl Extra, was released. This was the first time tracks from the Extra CD series had been issued on vinyl.

Another strand of the Now Yearbook series, in August 2022, is the somewhat experimental release of a limited edition, extended play, 7" vinyl single, containing 2 tracks each from the 1983 and 1984 Yearbooks. This is the first time the Now That's What I Call Music! brand has released music commercially on 7" vinyl.

The Now Yearbook series continues both forwards, with Now Yearbook 1985 issued in November 2022, and backwards, with the release of Now Yearbook 1979 in September 2022 (an Extra followed in October). The latter contains a new retro-'70s Now logo design and artwork which complements its '80s sister Yearbook series. The series then moved forward again, with the release of Now Yearbook 1992 in July 2023 (an Extra followed in August). The 1990s Yearbook series contains a new retro-'90s logo design and artwork which also complements its sister decade series.

The tie-in television programmes are a month-by-month video playlist of tracks, from one year previously featured on a Now Yearbook album, with Bruno Brookes, Simon Bates and Jenny Powell presenting.

The Yearbook series was introduced to the Vault series, an album series with songs that are lesser known in the UK, but are way better known in the US and other countries (e.g. "Weird Al" Yankovic's "Eat It" peaked at #36 in the UK, but was a bigger hit in America (#12), Canada (#5), New Zealand (#6) and in Australia (where it reached #1)).

1. Now Yearbook 1983 (25 June 2021) 4-CD and 3-LP translucent red vinyl selection (black vinyl selection released on 18 August 2023)
2. Now Yearbook 1984 (29 October 2021) 4-CD and 3-LP translucent blue vinyl selection (black vinyl selection released on 18 August 2023)
3. Now Yearbook Extra 1983 (10 December 2021) 3-CD selection
4. Now Yearbook Extra 1984 (14 January 2022) 3-CD selection
5. Now Yearbook 1982 (4 February 2022) 4-CD and 3-LP translucent yellow vinyl selection (black vinyl selection released on 25 October 2024)
6. Now Yearbook Extra 1982 (18 March 2022) 3-CD selection
7. Now Yearbook 1981 (20 May 2022) 4-CD and 3-LP translucent red vinyl selection (black vinyl selection released on 25 October 2024)
8. Now Yearbook Extra 1981 (1 July 2022) 3-CD selection
9. Now Yearbook 1980 (15 July 2022) 4-CD and 3-LP transparent 'clear' vinyl selection (black vinyl selection released on 25 October 2024)
10. Now Yearbook Extra 1980 (26 August 2022) 3-CD selection
11. Now Yearbook 1979 (9 September 2022) 4-CD and 3-LP bright orange vinyl selection (black vinyl selection released on 25 October 2024)
12. Now Yearbook Extra 1979 (21 October 2022) 3-CD selection
13. Now Yearbook 1985 (4 November 2022) 4-CD and 3-LP translucent green vinyl selection
14. Now Yearbook 1980-1984: The Final Chapter (2 December 2022) 4-CD and 3-LP translucent gold vinyl selection
15. Now Yearbook Extra 1985 (6 January 2023) 3-CD selection
16. Now Yearbook Extra 1980-1984: The Final Chapter (10 February 2023) 3-CD selection
17. Now Yearbook 1986 (24 February 2023) 4-CD and 3-LP translucent purple vinyl selection
18. Now Yearbook Extra 1986 (7 April 2023) 3-CD selection
19. Now Yearbook 1978 (28 April 2023) 4-CD and 3-LP translucent pink vinyl selection
20. Now Yearbook Extra 1978 (9 June 2023) 3-CD selection
21. Now Yearbook 1992 (7 July 2023) 4-CD and 3-LP green vinyl selection
22. Now Yearbook Extra 1992 (18 August 2023) 3-CD selection
23. Now Yearbook 1973 (8 September 2023) 4-CD and 3-LP red vinyl selection
24. Now Yearbook Extra 1973 (13 October 2023) 3-CD selection
25. Now Yearbook 1988 (3 November 2023) 4-CD and 3-LP translucent blue vinyl selection
26. Now Yearbook Extra 1988 (12 January 2024) 3-CD selection
27. Now Yearbook 1990 (2 February 2024) 4-CD and 3-LP translucent orange vinyl selection
28. Now Yearbook Extra 1990 (15 March 2024) 3-CD selection
29. Now Yearbook 1974 (3 May 2024) 4-CD and 3-LP green vinyl selection
30. Now Yearbook Extra 1974 (7 June 2024) 3-CD selection
31. Now Yearbook 1993 (28 June 2024) 4-CD and 3-LP pink vinyl selection
32. Now Yearbook Extra 1993 (9 August 2024) 3-CD selection
33. Now Yearbook 1987 (30 August 2024) 4-CD and 3-LP translucent orange vinyl selection
34. Now Yearbook Extra 1987 (11 October 2024) 3-CD selection
35. Now Yearbook 1977 (1 November 2024) 4-CD and 3-LP stunning blue vinyl selection
36. Now Yearbook Extra 1977 (10 January 2025) 3-CD selection
37. Now Yearbook 1998 (14 February 2025) 4-CD and 3-LP neon violet vinyl selection
38. Now Yearbook Extra 1998 (28 March 2025) 3-CD selection
39. Now Yearbook 1989 (25 April 2025) 4-CD and 3-LP stunning pink vinyl selection
40. Now Yearbook Extra 1989 (6 June 2025) 3-CD selection
41. Now Yearbook 1997 (27 June 2025) 4-CD and 3-LP gorgeous green vinyl selection
42. Now Yearbook Extra 1997 (8 August 2025) 3-CD selection
43. Now Yearbook 1976 (29 August 2025) 4-CD and 3-LP lovely lime green vinyl selection
44. Now Yearbook Extra 1976 (10 October 2025) 3-CD selection
45. Now Yearbook 1991 (31 October 2025) 4-CD and 3-LP bright yellow vinyl selection
46. Now Yearbook Extra 1991 (9 January 2026) 3-CD selection
47. Now Yearbook 1985-1989: The Final Chapter (13 February 2026) 4-CD and 3-LP shimmering silver vinyl selection
48. Now Yearbook Extra 1985-1989: The Final Chapter (27 March 2026) 3-CD selection
49. Now Yearbook 1972 (8 May 2026) 4-CD and 3-LP beautiful blue vinyl selection
50. Now Yearbook 1999 (26 June 2026) 4-CD and 3-LP magical magenta-red vinyl selection
51. Now Yearbook Extra 1972 (3 July 2026) 3-CD selection
52. Now Yearbook Extra 1999 (7 August 2026) 3-CD selection
53. Now Yearbook 1971 (28 August 2026) 4-CD selection and (2 October 2026) 3-LP bright yellow vinyl selection
54. Now Yearbook Extra 1971 (9 October 2026) 3-CD selection
55. Now Yearbook 1994 (30 October 2026) 4-CD and 3-LP light blue vinyl selection

=== Vinyl extras (2022–present) ===
1. Now Yearbook 1980-1984: Vinyl Extra (16 December 2022) 5-LP box set, clear, red, yellow, red and blue vinyl
2. Now Yearbook 1980-1984: Vinyl Extra Volume 2 (14 June 2024) 5-LP box set, clear, red, yellow, red and blue vinyl
3. Now Yearbook 1985-1989: Vinyl Extra (27 March 2026) 5-LP box set, green, purple, orange, blue and pink vinyl

=== Now Yearbook – The Vault (2024–present) ===
1. Now Yearbook – The Vault: 1983 (31 May 2024) 4-CD and 3-LP translucent red vinyl selection
2. Now Yearbook – The Vault: 1984 (4 October 2024) 4-CD and 3-LP translucent blue vinyl selection
3. Now Yearbook – The Vault: 1980 (28 February 2025) 4-CD and 3-LP beautiful clear vinyl selection
4. Now Yearbook – The Vault: 1981 (13 June 2025) 4-CD and 3-LP beautiful transparent purple vinyl selection
5. Now Yearbook – The Vault: 1982 (16 January 2026) 4-CD and 3-LP transparent yellow vinyl selection
6. Now Yearbook – The Vault: 1985 (15 May 2026) 4-CD and 3-LP gorgeous green vinyl selection
7. Now Yearbook - The Vault: 1986 (18 September 2026) 4-CD and 3-LP gorgeous purple vinyl selection

=== Now Yearbook Presents (2025–present) ===
1. Now Yearbook Presents - The 60s - Volume 1: 1960-1962 (21 November 2025) 4-CD and 3-LP bright red vinyl selection
2. Now Yearbook Presents - The 60s - Volume 2: 1963-1964 (27 February 2026) 4-CD and 3-LP white vinyl selection
3. Now Yearbook Presents - The 60s - Volume 3: 1965-1966 (10 July 2026) 4-CD and 3-LP beautiful blue vinyl selection
4. Now Yearbook Presents - The 60s - Volume 4: 1967-1969 - Part One (coming 27 November 2026) 4-LP and 3-LP black vinyl selection

=== Now That's What I Call an Era (2025–present) ===
1. Now That's What I Call an Era: The Sound of the Suburbs (7 February 2025) 4-CD (special booklet and gatefold) and 3-LP black, white and red vinyl selection
2. Now That's What I Call an Era: The Albums (30 May 2025) 4-CD (special booklet and gatefold) and 3-LP blue, white and red vinyl selection
3. Now That's What I Call an Era: Such a Good Feeling (26 September 2025) 4-CD (special booklet and gatefold) and 3-LP blue, white and yellow vinyl selection
4. Now That's What I Call an Era: Disco (7 November 2025) 4-CD (special booklet and gatefold) and 3-LP blue, violet and pink vinyl selection
5. Now That's What I Call an Era: (Feels Like) Heaven (13 March 2026) 4-CD (special booklet and gatefold) and 3-LP red, blue and pink vinyl selection
6. Now That's What I Call an Era: ...One More Time (11 September 2026) 4-CD (special booklet and gatefold) and 3-LP pink, blue and green vinyl selection
7. Now That's What I Call an Era: Ballroom Blitz (6 November 2026) 4-CD (special booklet and gatefold) and 3-LP red, white and gold vinyl selection

=== Now Vinyl series (2021–present) ===
The 21st-century vinyl revival inspired limited-edition Now collections issued on vinyl only, limited to a run of 1200 copies worldwide. Some of them have unique track listings and are not related to similarly themed collections already issued on compact disc; however, more recent releases have been 'selections' taken from a larger CD collection (Rock, for example). Due to the higher cost of pressing vinyl and the limited time they are available, they cost at least three times their compact-disc counterparts. They are mostly pressed on black vinyl as standard although some are released on coloured vinyl. The Now Yearbook series also releases a vinyl selection of its primary release, with an Extra round-up vinyl box set featuring tracks from the CD-only series, released at the end of 2022.

1. Now Presents...The 1970s (10 December 2021) limited edition 5-LP box set, black vinyl
2. Now Presents...Electronic (19 August 2022) 5-LP box set, black vinyl
3. Now That's What I Call Rock 2022 (11 November 2022) 3-LP set, black vinyl
4. Now That's What I Call Eurovision Song Contest (28 April 2023) 5-LP deluxe box set, clear transparent vinyl
5. Now Presents...Classic Soul (22 September 2023) 5-LP box set, black vinyl
6. Now Presents...Disco (8 December 2023) 5-LP box set, purple vinyl
7. Now Presents...The 1980s (6 September 2024) 5-LP box set, red, yellow, pink, green and blue vinyl
8. Now Presents...12" 80s: Volume 1 (1980-1982) (6 December 2024) 5-LP box set, red, yellow, green, blue and purple vinyl
9. Now Presents...12" 80s: Volume 2 (1983-1984) (17 October 2025) 5-LP box set, blue, hot pink, orange, yellow and green vinyl
10. Now Presents...12" 80s: Volume 3 (1985-1986) (17 July 2026) 5-LP box set, red, yellow, blue, hot pink and lime green vinyl
11. Now That's What I Call Music! Vinyl ['25-'26] (13 November 2026) 3-LP beautiful red vinyl

=== Now That's What I Call 80s Dancefloor (2023–2025) ===
1. Now That's What I Call 80s Dancefloor: Hi-NRG & Pop (13 October 2023) 2-LP set, green and blue vinyl
2. Now That's What I Call 80s Dancefloor: Disco & Electro (1 December 2023) 2-LP set, purple and pink vinyl
3. Now That's What I Call 80s Dancefloor: Soul & Disco (23 February 2024) 2-LP set, flaming yellow and orange vinyl
4. Now That's What I Call 80s Dancefloor: R&B & Funk (17 May 2024) 2-LP set, hot red and white vinyl
5. Now That's What I Call 80s Dancefloor: Pure Pop (16 August 2024) 2-LP set, fabulous pink and blue vinyl
6. Now That's What I Call 80s Dancefloor: Synth (6 December 2024) blue and clear vinyl.
7. Now That's What I Call 80s Dancefloor: Floor Fillers (28 March 2025) transparent blue and green vinyl

=== Now HMV vinyl series (2022–2024) ===
1. Now That's What I Call HMV (17 June 2022) 2-LP set, translucent pink vinyl
2. Now That's What I Call HMV: Anthemic (16 June 2023) 2-LP set, blue vinyl
3. Now That's What I Call HMV: Singer and Song (14 June 2024) 2-LP set, purple vinyl

=== Now Millennium series (2023–2024) ===
The Now Millennium series are 4-CD and 2-LP vinyl sets, each representing two years of music, which launched in June 2023.

1. Now Millennium: 2000–2001 (2 June 2023) 4-CD and 2-LP beautiful red and white vinyl selection
2. Now Millennium: 2002–2003 (29 September 2023) 4-CD and 2-LP vibrant blue and white vinyl selection
3. Now Millennium: 2004–2005 (1 March 2024) 4-CD and 2-LP stunning opaque yellow and white vinyl selection
4. Now Millennium: 2006–2007 (14 June 2024) 4-CD and 2-LP stunning opaque orange and white vinyl selection
5. Now Millennium: 2008–2009 (27 September 2024) 4-CD and 2-LP gorgeous gold and white vinyl selection

=== Now 12" 80s series (2023–present) ===
1. Now 12" 80s: 1980 (14 July 2023)
2. Now 12" 80s: 1981 (20 October 2023)
3. Now 12" 80s: 1982 - Part 1 (19 January 2024)
4. Now 12" 80s: 1982 - Part 2 (12 April 2024)
5. Now 12" 80s: 1983 - Part 1 (19 July 2024)
6. Now 12" 80s: 1983 - Part 2 (18 October 2024)
7. Now 12" 80s: 1984 - Part 1 (17 January 2025)
8. Now 12" 80s: 1984 - Part 2 (11 April 2025)
9. Now 12" 80s: 1985 - Part 1 (11 July 2025)
10. Now 12" 80s: 1985 - Part 2 (24 October 2025)
11. Now 12" 80s: 1986 - Part 1 (6 February 2026)
12. Now 12" 80s: 1986 - Part 2 (10 April 2026)
13. Now 12" 80s: 1987 - Part 1 (17 July 2026)
14. Now 12" 80s: 1987 - Part 2 (16 October 2026)

== United States ==
Volume	Release date	Peak chart positions			RIAA certification	AllMusic review
Volume	Release date	US Albums	US R&B	US Digital	RIAA certification	AllMusic review
1	27 October 1998	10			Platinum	2.5/5 stars
2	27 July 1999	3			2× Platinum	4/5 stars
3	7 December 1999	4			2× Platinum	3/5 stars
4	18 July 2000	1			2× Platinum	not rated
5	14 November 2000	2			4× Platinum	4/5 stars
6	3 April 2001	1			3× Platinum	3/5 stars
7	31 July 2001	1	3		3× Platinum	3/5 stars
8	20 November 2001	2			3× Platinum	4/5 stars
9	19 March 2002	1			2× Platinum	2.5/5 stars
10	23 July 2002	2			Platinum	3/5 stars
11	19 November 2002	2			2× Platinum	3/5 stars
12	25 March 2003	3	10		Platinum	2/5 stars
13	22 July 2003	2			Platinum	2.5/5 stars
14	4 November 2003	3	11		3× Platinum	3/5 stars
15	23 March 2004	2			2× Platinum	2.5/5 stars
16	27 July 2004	1	2		3× Platinum	3/5 stars
17	2 November 2004	1	4		3× Platinum	2.5/5 stars
18	15 March 2005	2			Platinum	3/5 stars
19	19 July 2005	1	1		2× Platinum	3/5 stars
20	1 November 2005	1			2× Platinum	2.5/5 stars
21	4 April 2006	2	2	16	Platinum	3/5 stars
22	11 July 2006	1		14	Platinum	3/5 stars
23	7 November 2006	1	3	16	2× Platinum	3/5 stars
24	27 March 2007	1	3		Platinum	3.5/5 stars
25	17 July 2007	1	2		Platinum	3.5/5 stars
26	13 November 2007	3	4		Platinum	not rated
27	11 March 2008	2		16	Platinum	3.5/5 stars
28	3 June 2008	2		13	Platinum	3/5 stars
29	11 November 2008	3		23	Platinum	2.5/5 stars
30	24 March 2009	1			Gold	3.5/5 stars
31	30 June 2009	1	2	17	Gold	3/5 stars
32	3 November 2009	5			—	3/5 stars
33	23 March 2010	3		15	Gold	2.5/5 stars
34	15 June 2010	4			Gold	2/5 stars
35	31 August 2010	2		16	Gold	2/5 stars
36	9 November 2010	4			—	2.5/5 stars
37	8 February 2011	1		15	—	3.5/5 stars
38	3 May 2011	2		11	Gold	3/5 stars
39	9 August 2011	3		5	—	2.5/5 stars
40	8 November 2011	3		10	Gold	2.5/5 stars
41	7 February 2012	3		1	Gold	3/5 stars
42	1 May 2012	3		11	—	3/5 stars
43	7 August 2012	1		3	Gold	2.5/5 stars
44	6 November 2012	2		10	Gold	3/5 stars
45	5 February 2013	3		10	Gold	3/5 stars
46	7 May 2013	3		7	—	3/5 stars
47	6 August 2013	2		7	—	3/5 stars
48	11 November 2013	3		5	Gold	not rated
49	4 February 2014	1		6	Gold	3/5 stars
50	6 May 2014	1		2	Gold	3/5 stars
51	5 August 2014	2		5	—	3.5/5 stars
52	27 October 2014	2		3	Gold	2.5/5 stars
53	3 February 2015	2		7	—	3/5 stars
54	4 May 2015	3		7	—	3/5 stars
55	7 August 2015	3		4	—	3/5 stars
56	30 October 2015	4		7	—	3.5/5 stars
57	5 February 2016	7		9	—	2.5/5 stars
58	29 April 2016	7		17	—	2.5/5 stars
59	5 August 2016	5		6	—	not rated
60	4 November 2016	7		8	—	3/5 stars
61	27 January 2017	5		8	—	—
62	5 May 2017	11		10	—	not rated
63	4 August 2017	5	—	2	—	—
64	3 November 2017	12	—	10	—	not rated
65	2 February 2018	10	—	4	—	not rated
66	4 May 2018	20	—	14	—	not rated
67	3 August 2018	19	—	14	—	not rated
68	26 October 2018	52	—	—	—	not rated
69	1 February 2019	32	—	4	—	not rated
70	3 May 2019	71	—	—	—	not rated
71	2 August 2019	39	—	—	—	not rated
72	25 October 2019	85	—	—	—	not rated
73	24 January 2020	64	—	—	—	not rated
74	1 May 2020	141	—	—	—	not rated
75	7 August 2020	150	—	—	—	3/5 stars
76	23 October 2020	—	—	—	—	—
77	29 January 2021	125	—	—	—	—
78	30 April 2021	185	—	—	—	—
79	6 August 2021	187	—	—	—	—
80	29 October 2021	—	—	—	—	—
81	28 January 2022	—	—	—	—	—
82	6 May 2022	—	—	—	—	—
83	5 August 2022	—	—	—	—	—
84	28 October 2022	—	—	—	—	—
85	3 February 2023	—	—	—	—	—
86	5 May 2023	—	—	—	—	—
87	4 August 2023	—	—	—	—	—
88	27 October 2023	—	—	—	—	—
89	26 January 2024	—	—	—	—	—
90	3 May 2024	—	—	—	—	—

=== Special Editions (2002–2024) ===
1. Now Presents: Off the Hook (21 May 2002)
2. What's New! (November 2002)
3. Now That's What I Call Music! #1's (24 January 2006)
4. Now That's What I Call Party Hits! (13 November 2007)
5. Now That's What I Call the 80s (11 March 2008)
6. Now That's What I Call Classic Rock (3 June 2008)
7. The Best of Now That's What I Call Music! 10th Anniversary (11 November 2008)
8. Now That's What I Call Motown (13 January 2009)
9. Now That's What I Call Power Ballads (24 March 2009)
10. Now That's What I Call the 80s 2 (30 June 2009)
11. Now That's What I Call Club Hits (22 September 2009)
12. Now That's What I Call Dance Classics (3 November 2009)
13. Now That's What I Call Love (26 January 2010)
14. Now That's What I Call Faith (23 March 2010)
15. Now That's What I Call Club Hits 2 (12 October 2010)
16. Now That's What I Call the 1990s (9 November 2010)
17. Now That's What I Call R&B (1 February 2011)
18. Now That's What I Call the Modern Songbook (8 February 2011)
19. Now That's What I Call the 80s Hits (3 May 2011)
20. Now That's What I Call I Wanna Rock (17 June 2011)
21. Now That's What I Call Classic Rock Hits (1 May 2012)
22. Now That's What I Call British (17 July 2012)
23. Now That's What I Call Party Anthems (7 August 2012)
24. Now That's What I Call Disney (6 November 2012)
25. Now That's What I Call Love Songs (22 January 2013)
26. Now That's What I Call Soundcheck (2 July 2013)
27. Now That's What I Call Disney 2 (11 November 2013)
28. Now That's What I Call Slow Jams (4 February 2014)
29. Now That's What I Call Party Anthems 2 (5 August 2014)
30. Now That's What I Call Disney 3 (27 October 2014)
31. Now That's What I Call Classics (22 December 2014)
32. Now That's What I Call Movies (3 February 2015)
33. Now That's What I Call #1's (4 May 2015)
34. Now That's What I Call Funk (4 May 2015)
35. Now That's What I Call New Wave 80s (7 August 2015)
36. Now That's What I Call Halloween (11 September 2015)
37. Now That's What I Call Disney Princess (30 October 2015)
38. Now That's What I Call Rock (22 January 2016)
39. Now That's What I Call Power Ballads Hits (5 February 2016)
40. Now That's What I Call Broadway (29 April 2016)
41. Now That's What I Call Party Anthems 3 (5 August 2016)
42. Now That's What I Call 90's Pop (27 January 2017)
43. Now That's What I Call a Workout 2017: Hits & Remixes (5 May 2017)
44. Now That's What I Call Tailgate Anthems (4 August 2017)
45. Now That's What I Call the 00's (3 November 2017)
46. Now That's What I Call Disney Junior Music (16 March 2018)
47. Now That's What I Call Hits & Remixes 2018 (4 May 2018)
48. Now That's What I Call Party Anthems 4 (3 August 2018)
49. Now That's What I Call Music! 20th Anniversary: Volume 1 (26 October 2018)
50. Now That's What I Call Music! 20th Anniversary: Volume 2 (1 February 2019)
51. Now That's What I Call Hits & Remixes 2019 (3 May 2019)
52. Now That's What I Call Yacht Rock (2 August 2019)
53. Now That's What I Call 80s Hits & Remixes (25 October 2019)
54. Now That's What I Call Yacht Rock Volume 2 (1 May 2020)
55. Now That's What I Call a Decade 2010s (7 August 2020)
56. Now That's What I Call a Decade 1990s (30 April 2021)
57. Now That's What I Call a Decade 1980s (18 June 2021)
58. Now That's What I Call 2000s Hip Hop (28 January 2022)
59. Now That's What I Call a Decade 2000s (6 May 2022)
60. Now That's What I Call Music! Pride (20 May 2022)
61. Now That's What I Call Music! '90s Alternative Rock (17 June 2022)
62. Now That's What I Call Music! Classic Rock (28 October 2022)
63. Now That's What I Call Music! Hip Hop Party (3 February 2023)
64. Now That's What I Call Music! Disco (5 May 2023)
65. Now That's What I Call Proud (5 May 2023)
66. Now That's What I Call Music! '90s Pop (4 August 2023)
67. Now That's What I Call Hip Hop at 50 (6 October 2023)
68. Now That's What I Call 25th Anniversary: Volume 1 (27 October 2023)
69. Now That's What I Call '90s R&B (26 January 2024)
70. Now That's What I Call 25th Anniversary: Volume 2 (3 May 2024)
71. Now That's What I Call K-Pop (17 May 2024)

=== Christmas series (2001–2023) ===
1. Now That's What I Call Christmas! (23 October 2001)
2. Now That's What I Call Christmas! 2: The Signature Collection (30 September 2003)
3. Now That's What I Call Christmas! 3 (10 October 2006)
4. The Essential Now That's What I Call Christmas (23 September 2008)
5. Now That's What I Call Christmas! 4 (12 October 2010)
6. Now That's What I Call Today's Christmas (25 September 2012)
7. Now Christmas (8 October 2013)
8. Now That's What I Call Merry Christmas (7 October 2016)
9. Now That's What I Call Merry Christmas (6 October 2017)
10. Now That's What I Call Merry Christmas (5 October 2018)
11. Now That's What I Call Music! R&B Christmas (2 October 2020)
12. Now That's What I Call Christmas Classics (10 September 2021)
13. Now That's What I Call a Wonderful Christmas (16 June 2022)
14. Now That's What I Call a Most Wonderful Christmas (6 October 2023)

=== Country series (2008–2024) ===
1. Now That's What I Call Country (26 August 2008)
2. Now That's What I Call Country Volume 2 (25 August 2009)
3. Now That's What I Call a Country Christmas (6 October 2009)
4. Now That's What I Call the USA: The Patriotic Country Collection (15 June 2010)
5. Now That's What I Call Country Volume 3 (14 September 2010)
6. Now That's What I Call Country Volume 4 (14 June 2011)
7. Now That's What I Call Country Ballads (24 January 2012)
8. Now That's What I Call Country Volume 5 (12 June 2012)
9. Now That's What I Call a Country Party (7 May 2013)
10. Now That's What I Call Country Volume 6 (11 June 2013)
11. Now That's What I Call Country Ballads 2 (21 January 2014)
12. Now That's What I Call Country Volume 7 (3 June 2014)
13. Now That's What I Call ACM Awards 50 Years (31 March 2015)
14. Now That's What I Call Country Volume 8 (9 June 2015)
15. Now That's What I Call Country Christmas 2015 (23 October 2015)
16. Now That's What I Call Southern Rock (29 April 2016)
17. Now That's What I Call Country Volume 9 (10 June 2016)
18. Now That's What I Call Country #1's (4 November 2016)
19. Now That's What I Call Country Volume 10 (9 June 2017)
20. Now That's What I Call Country: Songs of Inspiration (16 March 2018)
21. Now That's What I Call Country Volume 11 (8 June 2018)
22. Now That's What I Call Country Volume 12 (29 March 2019)
23. Now That's What I Call a Country Christmas 2019 (4 October 2019)
24. Now That's What I Call Country: Songs of Inspiration: Volume 2 (27 March 2020)
25. Now That's What I Call Country Classics '90s (5 June 2020)
26. Now That's What I Call Country Volume 13 (5 June 2020)
27. Now That's What I Call Music! Outlaw Country (19 March 2021)
28. Now That's What I Call Country Volume 14 (18 June 2021)
29. Now That's What I Call Country Classics 00s (18 June 2021)
30. Now That's What I Call Country Volume 15 (3 June 2022)
31. Now That's What I Call Country Classics 80s (13 June 2022)
32. Now That's What I Call Country Volume 16 (2 June 2023)
33. Now That's What I Call Country Classics 90s Dance Party (2 June 2023)
34. Now Country - The Very Best Of (15th Anniversary Edition) (22 September 2023)
35. Now That's What I Call Country Classics 70s (1 March 2024)
36. Now That's What I Call Country Volume 17 (7 June 2024) (CD/LP)

=== DVD series (2003–2004) ===
1. Now That's What I Call Music! DVD: The Best Videos of 2003 (4 November 2003)
2. Now That's What I Call Music! DVD 2 (2 November 2004)

=== Latino series (2006–2009) ===
1. Now Esto Es Musica! Latino (21 March 2006)
2. Now Esto Es Musica! Latino 2 (21 November 2006)
3. Now Esto Es Musica! Latino 3 (9 October 2007)
4. Now Esto Es Musica! Latino 4 (24 March 2009)

== Asia ==
The Asian Now series was a collaborative venture between EMI (Hong Kong) Limited/PolyGram Records (Hong Kong) Limited and EMI (Malaysia) Sendirian Berhad. Compilations were released for English-language markets in Indonesia, Malaysia, Singapore, and Hong Kong.

1. Now That's What I Call Music! (20 July 1995)
2. Now That's What I Call Music! 2 (9 August 1996)
3. Now That's What I Call Music! 3 (1 September 1997)
4. Now That's What I Call Music! 4 (1998)
5. Now That's What I Call Music! 5 (1999)
6. Now That's What I Call Music! 6 (2000)
7. Now That's What I Call Music! 7 (2001)
8. Now That's What I Call Music! 8 (2002)
9. Now That's What I Call Music! 9 (2006)
10. Now That's What I Call Music! 10 (2008)

=== Chinese Best series ===
1. Now Chinese Best (1999)
2. Now Chinese Best 2 (2000)

=== Love series ===
1. Now That's What I Call Love (1998)
2. Now That's What I Call Love 2 (1999)
3. Now That's What I Call Love 3 (2000)
4. Now That's What I Call Love 4 (2001)
5. Now That's What I Call Love (2010)
6. Now That's What I Call Love Vol.2 (2011)
7. Now That's What I Call Love (2014)

=== Plus Series ===
1. Now+ (2004)
2. Now+ Vol.2 (2005)

=== Special editions ===
1. Now That's What I Call Jazz (2002)
2. Now The Essential Collection (2003)
3. Now That's What I Call Jazz (2007)
4. Now That's What I Call Arabia 2011 (2011)

== Australia ==
=== First series ===
1. Now That's What I Call Music! 1 (1987) (LP/MC)

=== Second series ===
1. Now 01 (12 August 2002)
2. Now 02 (2 December 2002)
3. Now 03 (28 April 2003)
4. Now 04 (15 September 2003)
5. Now 05 (15 March 2004)
6. Now 06 (12 July 2004)
7. Now 07 (22 November 2004)
8. Now 08 (14 March 2005)

=== Third series ===
1. Now Winter 2005 (4 July 2005)
2. Now Spring 2005 (27 September 2005)
3. Now Summer 2006 (1 December 2005)
4. Now Autumn 2006 (3 March 2006)
5. Now Winter 2006 (12 June 2006)
6. Now Spring 2006 (18 September 2006)
7. Now Summer 2007 (25 November 2006) (double CD)
8. Now Autumn 2007 (17 March 2007)
9. Now Winter 2007 (25 June 2007)
10. Now Spring 2007 (15 September 2007)
11. Now Summer 2008 (24 November 2007) (double CD)
12. Now Autumn 2008 (24 March 2008)
13. Now: The Hits of Winter 2008 (29 July 2008)
14. Now: The Hits of Spring 2008 (13 September 2008)
15. Now: The Hits of Summer 2009 (2008)
16. Now: The Hits of Autumn 2009 (2009)
17. Now: The Hits of Winter 2009 (2009)
18. Now: The Hits of Spring 2009 (August 2009)
19. Now: The Hits of Summer 2010 (2009)
20. Now: The Hits of Autumn 2010 (2010)
21. Now: The Hits of Winter 2010 (2010)
22. Now: The Hits of Spring 2010 (2010)
23. Now: The Hits of Summer 2011 (2010)
24. Now: The Hits of Autumn 2011 (2011)
25. Now: The Hits of Winter 2011 (2011)
26. Now: The Hits of Spring 2011 (9 September 2011)
27. Now: The Hits of Summer 2012 (11 November 2011)
28. Now: The Hits of Autumn 2012 (2012)
29. Now: The Hits of Winter 2012 (2012)
30. Now: The Hits of Spring 2012 (2012)
31. Now: The Hits of Summer 2013 (2012)
32. Now: The Hits of Autumn 2013 (2013)
33. Now: The Hits of Spring 2013 (2013)
34. Now: The Hits of Summer 2014 (2013)

=== Fourth series ===
1. NOW: Volume 1, 2014 (2014)
2. NOW: Volume 2, 2014 (2014)
3. NOW: Volume 3, 2014 (2014)
4. NOW: Volume 1, 2015 (1 May 2015)
5. NOW: Volume 2, 2015 (2015)
6. NOW: Volume 1, 2016 (2016)
7. NOW: Volume 2, 2016 (2016)
8. NOW: Volume 1, 2017 (2017)
9. NOW: Volume 1, 2018 (27 April 2018)
10. NOW: Volume 1, 2019 (26 April 2019)

=== 100% series ===
1. Now… That's What I Call Music! 100% Dance (1994)
2. Now… That's What I Call Music! 100% Ballads (1994)
3. Now… That's What I Call Music! 100% Rap (1994)
4. Now… That's What I Call Music! 100% Alternate (1994)
5. Now… That's What I Call Music! 100% Pop (1994)

=== DVD series ===
1. Now Vision 2004 (DVD) (2004)
2. Now Vision 2005 (DVD) (2005)
3. Now Vision 2006 (DVD) (2006)
4. Now Summer 2007 (DVD) (2006)

=== Special editions ===
1. Now Xmas (2008)
2. Now Xmas (2009)
3. Now Xmas (2011)
4. Now Dance – Mixed by Denzal Park (2011)
5. Now Dance – Mixed by Emily Scott (2011)
6. Now: 10 Years of Hits (2012)

== Benelux ==
1. Now, This is CD Music (1985)
- A co-release by EMI Bovema, Ariola Benelux and Virgin Records.

== Canada ==
=== Original series ===
1. Now That's What I Call Music! (1988) (Cd/LP)

=== Current series ===
1. Now! (1996)
2. Now! 2 (1997)
3. Now! 3 (1998)
4. Now! 4 (1999)
5. Now! 5 (2000)
6. Now! 6 (2001)
7. Now! 7 (2002)
8. Now! 8 (2003)
9. Now! 9 (2004)
10. Now! 10 (23 August 2005)
11. Now! 11 (2006)
12. Now! 12 (2007)
13. Now! 13 (2008)
14. Now! 14 (2009)
15. Now! 15 (2010)
16. Now! 16 (2010)
17. Now! 17 (2011)
18. Now! 18 (2011)
19. Now! 19 (2012)
20. Now! 20 (28 August 2012)
21. Now! 21 (7 February 2013)
22. Now! 22 (3 September 2013)
23. Now! 23 (3 June 2014)
24. Now! 24 (3 March 2015)
25. Now! 25 (28 August 2015)
26. Now! 26 (15 April 2016)
27. Now! 27 (23 September 2016)
28. Now! 28 (28 July 2017)

=== Then series ===
1. Then (1999)
2. Then 2 (2000)

=== Country series ===
1. Now! Country (2 May 2006)
2. Now! Country 2 (4 September 2007)
3. Now! Country Classics (2007)
4. Now! Country 3 (6 October 2009)
5. Now! Country 4 (28 September 2010)
6. Now! Country 5 (29 August 2011)
7. Now! Country 6 (2012)
8. Now! Country 7 (2013)
9. Now! Country 8 (2013)
10. Now! Country 9 (2014)
11. Now! Country 10 (2015)
12. Now! Country 11 (2016)

=== Special Editions ===
1. Now That's What I Call Rock & Roll (1988)
2. Now! Blues (2005)
3. Now! Real Country (2005)
4. Now! Classic Rock (2005)
5. Now! Love (2005)
6. Now! Soul (2005)
7. Now! New Wave (2005)
8. Now! Rock n Roll (2005)
9. Now! Women Who Rock (2005)
10. Now! Bell Bottom Rock (2005)
11. Best of Now! (2005)
12. Now! 1970s (2010)
13. Now! 1980s (2010)
14. Now! 1990s (2010)
15. Now! 2000s (2010)
16. Now! Classical (2011)

=== Dance Editions ===
1. Now! Dance (2010)
2. Now! Dance 2 (2011)
3. Now! Dance 3 (2012)
4. Now! Dance 4 (2013)

== Denmark ==
1. Now That's What I Call Music! 1 (2002)
2. Now That's What I Call Music! 2 (2002)
3. Now That's What I Call Music! 3 (2003)
4. Now That's What I Call Music! 4 (2003)
5. Now That's What I Call Music! 5 (2003)
6. Now That's What I Call Music! 6 (2003)
7. Now That's What I Call Music! 7 (2004)
8. Now That's What I Call Music! 8 (2004)
9. Now That's What I Call Music! 9 (2004)
10. Now That's What I Call Music! 10 (2004)
11. Now That's What I Call Music! 11 (2005)
12. Now That's What I Call Music! 12 (2005)
13. Now That's What I Call Music! 13 (2005)
14. Now That's What I Call Music! 14 (11 November 2005)
15. Now That's What I Call Music! 15 (2006)
16. Now That's What I Call Music! 16 (2006)
17. Now That's What I Call Music! 17 (28 August 2006)
18. Now That's What I Call Music! 18 (2006)
19. Now That's What I Call Music! 19 (2007)

=== Big Hits series ===
1. Now Big Hits 1999 (1999)
2. Now Big Hits 2000 (2000)
3. Now Big Hits 2001 (2001)
4. Now Big Hits 2002 (2002)
5. Now Big Hits 2003 (2003)
6. Now Big Hits 2004 (2004)
7. Now Big Hits 2005 (2005)
8. Now Big Hits 2006 (2006)
9. Now Big Hits 2007 (2007)
10. Now Big Hits 2008 (2008)
11. Now Big Hits 2009 (2009)

=== Special Editions ===
1. Now That's What I Call Hip Hop Vol.1 (14 November 2003)

== Finland ==
1. Now That's What I Call Music! 1 (2003)
2. Now That's What I Call Music! 2 (2003)
3. Now That's What I Call Music! 3 (2004)
4. Now That's What I Call Music! 4 (2004)
5. Now That's What I Call Music! 5 (2005)
6. Now That's What I Call Music! 6 (2005)
7. Now That's What I Call Music! 7 (2006)
8. Now That's What I Call Music! 8 (2007)

=== Special Editions ===
1. Now That's What I Call Dance (2003)
2. Now That's What I Call Music! Pop Hits (2003)
3. Now Christmas 2012 (2012)
4. Now Hits 2013 (15 March 2013)

== France ==
1. Now! Hits Référence (25 February 2002)
2. Now! Hits Référence Vol.2 (17 May 2002)
3. Now! Hits Référence Vol.3 (20 August 2002)
4. Now! Hits Référence Vol.4 (4 November 2002)
5. Now! Hits Référence Vol.5 (25 March 2003)
6. Now! Hits Référence Vol.6 (24 June 2003)
7. Now! Hits Référence Vol.7 (26 August 2003)
8. Now! Hits Référence 2005 (29 August 2005)
9. Now! Hits Référence 2006 (3 July 2006)
10. Now! Hits Référence 2007 (1 December 2006)

== Greece ==
1. Now No.1:Αυτά Είναι Τα Hits Σήμερα! (2002)
2. Now No.2:Αυτά Είναι Τα Hits Σήμερα! (2003)
3. Now No.3:Αυτά Είναι Τα Hits Σήμερα! (2003)
4. Now No.4:Αυτά Είναι Τα Hits Σήμερα! (2003)
5. Now No.5:Αυτά Είναι Τα Hits Σήμερα! (2004)
6. Now No.6:Αυτά Είναι Τα Hits Σήμερα! (2004)
7. Now No.7:Αυτά Είναι Τα Hits Σήμερα! (2005)
8. Now No.8:Αυτά Είναι Τα Hits Σήμερα! (2006)
9. Now No.9:Αυτά Είναι Τα Hits Σήμερα! (2006)
10. Now No.10:Αυτά Είναι Τα Hits Σήμερα! (2007)
11. Now No.11:Αυτά Είναι Τα Hits Σήμερα! (2008)
12. Now 2010 :Αυτά Είναι Τα Hits Σήμερα (2009)
13. Now That's What I Call Music! 2016 (2015)

== Hungary ==
=== Original series ===
1. Now That's What I Call Music! (2003)
2. Now That's What I Call Music! II (2003)
3. Now That's What I Call Music! 3 (2003)
4. Now That's What I Call Music! 4 (2003)
5. Now That's What I Call Music! 5 (2004)
6. Now That's What I Call Music! 6 (2004)
7. Now That's What I Call Music! 7 (2005)
8. Now That's What I Call Music! 8 (2005)

=== Current series ===
1. Now.hu 1 (2003)
2. Now.hu 2 (16 February 2004)
3. Now.hu 3 (2004)
4. Now.hu 4 (17 February 2005)
5. Now.hu 5 (20 July 2005)
6. Now.hu 6 (15 February 2006)
7. Now.hu 7 (15 September 2006)
8. Now.hu 8 (2006)
9. Now.hu 9 (10 July 2007)
10. Now.hu 10 (2007)
11. Now.hu 11 (25 June 2008)
12. Now.hu 12 (22 April 2009)
13. Now.hu 13 (25 November 2009)

== Israel ==
1. Now That's What I Call Music! (1999)
2. Now That's What I Call Music! 2 (2000)
3. Now That's What I Call Music! 3 (2000)
4. Now That's What I Call Music! 4 (2001)
5. Now That's What I Call Music! 5 (2001)
6. Now That's What I Call Music! 6 (2002)
7. Now That's What I Call Music! 7 (2002)
8. Now That's What I Call Music! 8 (2002)
9. Now That's What I Call Music! 9 (2003)
10. Now That's What I Call Music! 10 (2004)
11. Now That's What I Call Music! 11 (2006)
12. Now That's What I Call Music! 12 (2007)
13. Now That's What I Call Music! 13 (2007)
14. Now That's What I Call Music! 14 (16 October 2008)
15. Now That's What I Call Music! 15 (2009)
16. Now That's What I Call Music! 16 (2010)
17. Now That's What I Call Music! 17 (2011)
18. Now That's What I Call Music! 18 (2012)
19. Now That's What I Call Music! 19 (2013)
20. Now That's What I Call Music! 20 (2014)
21. Now That's What I Call Music! 21 (18 February 2016)
22. Now That's What I Call Music! 22 (26 September 2016)
23. Now That's What I Call Music! 23 (27 February 2018)
24. Now That's What I Call Music! 24 (28 March 2019)

=== Dance Series ===
1. Now Dance 2003 (2003)
2. Now That's What I Call Music! Dance 2004 (2004)
3. Now That's What I Call Music! Dance 2006 (2006)
4. Now That's What I Call Music! Dance 2007 (2007)
5. Now Dance 2011 (2011)
6. Now Dance 2012 (2012)

=== Hip Hop Series ===
1. Now That's What I Call Music! Hip Hop (2004)
2. Now That's What I Call Music! Hip Hop 2 (2005)
3. Now That's What I Call Music! Hip Hop 3 (2007)

=== Special Editions ===
1. Now That's What I Call Music!: Best of 2000-2009 (24 June 2010)
2. Now That's What I Call Running 2015 (2015)

== Italy ==
=== Original Series ===
1. Now - All the Hits Primavera 2000 (2000)
2. Now - All the Hits Estate 2000 (2000)
3. Now - All the Hits 2001 (2001)
4. Now - All the Hits Primavera 2001 (2001)
5. Now - All the Hits Inverno 2001 (2001)
6. Now - All the Hits Estate 2001 (2001)
7. Now - All the Hits Primavera 2002 (2002)
8. Now - All the Hits Autunno 2002 (2002)
9. Now - All the Hits Estate 2002 (2002)
10. Now - All the Hits Inverno 2003 (2003)
11. Now - All the Hits Estate 2003 (2003)
12. Now - All the Hits 1 (2004)
13. Now - All the Hits 2 (2004)
14. Now - All the Hits 3 (2004)
15. Now - All the Hits 2006 (2006)
16. Now - All the Hits 2007 (2007)
17. Now - All the Hits 2008 (2008)
18. Now - All the Hits 2009 (2009)
19. Now - All the Hits 2010 (2010)
20. Now - All the Hits 2011 (2011)
21. Now - All the Hits 2012 (2012)
22. Now - All the Hits 2013 (2013)
23. Now - All the Hits 2014 (2014)

=== Current Series ===
1. Now! Spring 2007 (2007)
2. Now! Summer 2007 (2007)
3. Now! Winter 2007 (2007)
4. Now! Spring 2008 (2008)
5. Now! Winter 2009 (2009)
6. Now! Spring 2010 (2010)
7. Now! Summer 2010 (2010)
8. Now Summer Hits 2011 (2011)
9. Now Superhits - Autumn 2011 (2011)
10. Now! Spring 2012 (2012)
11. Now! Summer 2012 (2012)
12. Now! Autumn 2012 (2012)
13. Now! Winter 2012 (2012)
14. Now! Spring 2013 (2013)

=== All the Hits Italia Series ===
1. Now - All the Hits Italia 2001 (2001)
2. Now - All the Hits Italia 2002 (2002)
3. Now - All the Hits Italia 2005 (2005)
4. Now - All the Hits Italia (2005)
5. Now - All the Hits Italia 2006 (2005)
6. Now Hits of the Year (2008)
7. Now Hits 2010! (2010)
8. Now Hits 2011! (2011)
9. Now Hits 2012! (2012)
10. Now Hits 2013! (2013)

=== Story Series ===
1. Now! Story 1980/1981 (2007)
2. Now! Story 1982/1983 (2007)
3. Now! Story 1984/1985 (2007)
4. Now! Story 1986/1987 (2007)
5. Now! Story 1988/1989 (2007)
6. Now! Story 1990/1991 (2007)
7. Now! Story 1992/1993 (2008)
8. Now! Story 1994/1995 (2008)
9. Now! Story 1996/1997 (2008)
10. Now! Story 1998/1999 (2008)

== Japan ==
=== Original Series ===
1. Now!! (6 April 1988)
2. Now!! 2 (25 January 1989)
3. Now!! 3 (26 July 1989)
4. Now!! 4 (11 April 1990)

=== Second Series ===
1. Now That's What I Call Music! 1 (8 December 1993)
2. Now That's What I Call Music! 2 (9 November 1994)
3. Now That's What I Call Music! 3 (8 November 1995)
4. Now That's What I Call Music! 4 (19 June 1996)
5. Now That's What I Call Music! 5 (7 November 1996)
6. Now That's What I Call Music! 6 (11 June 1997)
7. Now That's What I Call Music! 7 (7 November 1997)
8. Now That's What I Call Music! 8 (24 June 1998)
9. Now That's What I Call Music! 9 (2 December 1998)
10. Now That's What I Call Music! 10 (26 November 1999)
11. Now That's What I Call Music! 11 (6 December 2000)

=== Third Series ===
1. Now That's What I Call Music! 2001 (27 September 2001)

=== Best Series ===
1. Now That's What I Call Music! Best (9 April 1999)
2. Now That's What I Call Music! Best Returns (28 August 2002)
3. Now That's What I Call Music! 90's Best (24 June 2009)
4. Now That's What I Call Music! Love Best (30 June 2010)
5. Now That's What I Call Music! 00's Best (25 May 2011)
6. Now That's What I Call Music! 80's Best (26 May 2011)

=== Jazz Series ===
1. Now Jazz (7 June 1995)
2. Now Jazz 2 (8 November 1995)
3. Now Jazz Xmas (7 November 1997)
4. Now Jazz 3 (1997)
5. Now Jazz Xmas Millennium
6. Now Jazz 4
7. Now Jazz Best Millennium (25 October 2000)
8. Now Jazz Vocal
9. Now Jazz Ballad
10. Now That's What I Call Music! Jazz Hits

=== Classics Series ===
1. Now Classics
2. Now Classics 2
3. Now Classics 3
4. Now Classics: Cinema & TV
5. Now That's What I Call Music! Classic Hits (24 June 2009)

=== Reggae Series ===
1. Now Reggae (19 June 1996)
2. Now Reggae 1997 (1997)
3. Now That's What I Call Music! Reggae Classics (2011)

=== Japan Series ===
1. Now Japan
2. Now Japan Best (1999)
3. Now Japan Best 1

=== Christmas Editions ===
1. Now!! Christmas (22 November 1989)
2. Now!! Christmas (1 November 1990)
3. Now That's What I Call Christmas (2011)

=== Special Editions ===
1. Now!! Oldies (25 January 1989)
2. Now!! Long Hot Summer (26 July 1989)
3. Now Ex (7 June 1995)
4. Now The Party!
5. Now Dance
6. Now Pianissimo (2 December 1998)
7. Now J-Pop 2001
8. Now That's What I Call Music! Yo-Gaku Hits (18 November 2009)
9. Now That's What I Call Music! Summer 80's & 90's Memories (2011)
10. Now That's What I Call Music! 80's Deluxe (2 October 2013)
11. Now That's What I Call Music! 90's Deluxe (2 October 2013)
12. Now That's What I Call Music! 70's Deluxe (4 February 2014)
13. Now That's What I Call Music! 00's Deluxe (4 February 2014)

== South Korea ==
1. Now That's What I Call K-Pop, Best of 2008-2016 (2017)

== Mexico ==
1. Now That's What I Call Music! (1995)
2. Now That's What I Call Music! 2 (1996)
3. Now That's What I Call Music! 3 (1996)
4. Now That's What I Call Music! 4 (1997)
5. Now That's What I Call Music! 5 (1997)
6. Now That's What I Call Music! 6 (1998)
7. Now That's What I Call Music! 7 (2000)
8. Now That's What I Call Music! 8 (2001)
9. Now That's What I Call Music! 9 (2002)
10. Now That's What I Call Music! 10 (2004)

== Argentina ==
1. Now That's What I Call Music! (1995)
2. Now That's What I Call Music! 2 (1996)
3. Now That's What I Call Music! 3 (1996)
4. Now That's What I Call Music! 4 (1997)
5. Now That's What I Call Music! 5 (1997)
6. Now That's What I Call Music! 6 (1998)
7. Now That's What I Call Music! 7 (2000)
8. Now That's What I Call Music! 8 (2001)
9. Now That's What I Call Music! 9 (2002)

== Netherlands ==
=== Original Series ===
1. Now This is Music (1984)
2. Now This is Music 2 (1985)
3. Now This is Music 3 (1985)
4. Now This is Music 4 (1986)
5. Now This is Music 5 (1986)
6. Now This is Music 6 (1987)
7. Now This is Music 7 (1987)
8. Now This is Music 8 (1988)
9. Now This is Music 9 (1988)
10. Now This is Music 10 (1989)
11. Now This is Music 11 (1989)

=== Second Series ===
1. Now This is Music 1 (1997)
2. Now This is Music 2 (1997)

=== Special Editions ===
1. Now This is Music: The Sound of the 80's, Vol.1 (July 1992)
2. Now Dance Hits 95 - Jaaroverzicht (1995)
3. Now Dance Hits 96 - Jaaroverzicht (1996)
4. Now Dance Hits 97 - Jaaroverzicht (November 1997)
5. Now This is Xmas (1997)

== New Zealand ==
=== Original Series ===
1. Now That's What I Call Music! (1985) (LP)

=== Second Series ===
1. Now That's What I Call Music! Volume 1 (1992)
2. Now That's What I Call Music! Volume 2 (1993)
3. Now That's What I Call Music! Volume 3 (1993)

=== Third Series (1997–2020) ===
1. Now That's What I Call Music! (1997)
2. Now That's What I Call Music! 2 (1998)
3. Now That's What I Call Music! 3 (1998)
4. Now That's What I Call Music! 4 (1999)
5. Now That's What I Call Music! 5 (1999)
6. Now That's What I Call Music! 6 (2000)
7. Now That's What I Call Music! 7 (2000)
8. Now That's What I Call Music! 8 (2001)
9. Now That's What I Call Music! 9 (2001)
10. Now That's What I Call Music! 10 (2002)
11. Now That's What I Call Music! 11 (2002)
12. Now That's What I Call Music! 12 (2003)
13. Now That's What I Call Music! 13 (2003)
14. Now That's What I Call Music! 14 (2004)
15. Now That's What I Call Music! 15 (2004)
16. Now That's What I Call Music! 16 (2004)
17. Now That's What I Call Music! 17 (2004)
18. Now That's What I Call Music! 18 (8 July 2005)
19. Now That's What I Call Music! 19 (2005)
20. Now That's What I Call Music! 20 (2006)
21. Now That's What I Call Music! 21 (2006)
22. Now That's What I Call Music! 22 (2006)
23. Now That's What I Call Music! 23 (2007)
24. Now That's What I Call Music! 24 (2007)
25. Now That's What I Call Music! 25 (2007)
26. Now That's What I Call Music! 26 (2008)
27. Now That's What I Call Music! 27 (2008)
28. Now That's What I Call Music! 28 (2008)
29. Now That's What I Call Music! 29 (2009)
30. Now That's What I Call Music! 30 (2009)
31. Now That's What I Call Music! 31 (2009)
32. Now That's What I Call Music! 32 (2010)
33. Now That's What I Call Music! 33 (2010)
34. Now That's What I Call Music! 34 (2010)
35. Now That's What I Call Music! 35 (2011)
36. Now That's What I Call Music! 36 (2011)
37. Now That's What I Call Music! 37 (3 November 2011)
38. Now That's What I Call Music! 38 (2012)
39. Now That's What I Call Music! 39 (2012)
40. Now That's What I Call Music! 40 (2 November 2012)
41. Now That's What I Call Music! 41 (19 April 2013)
42. Now That's What I Call Music! 42 (2013)
43. Now That's What I Call Music! 43 (2013)
44. Now That's What I Call Music! 44 (2014)
45. Now That's What I Call Music! 45 (2014)
46. Now That's What I Call Music! 46 (2014)
47. Now That's What I Call Music! 47 (2015)
48. Now That's What I Call Music! 48 (2015)
49. Now That's What I Call Music! 49 (2015)
50. Now That's What I Call Music! 50 (15 April 2016)
51. Now That's What I Call Music! 51 (2016)
52. Now That's What I Call Music! 52 (2016)
53. Now That's What I Call Music! 53 (2017)
54. Now That's What I Call Music! 54 (2017)
55. Now That's What I Call Music! 55 (2017)
56. Now That's What I Call Music! 56 (2018)
57. Now That's What I Call Music! 57 (2018)
58. Now That's What I Call Music! 58 (2018)
59. Now That's What I Call Music! 59 (2019)
60. Now That's What I Call Music! 60 (2019)
61. Now That's What I Call Music! 61 (3 July 2020)^{[A]}

=== Special Editions ===
1. Now That's What I Call Xmas (2010)
2. Now That's What I Call Christmas (2014)

== Norway ==
=== Original Series ===
1. Now That's What I Call Music! 1 (2009)
2. Now That's What I Call Music! 2 (2010)
3. Now That's What I Call Music! 3 (2010)
4. Now That's What I Call Music! 4 (2010)
5. Now That's What I Call Music! 5 (2011)
6. Now That's What I Call Music! 6 (2011)
7. Now That's What I Call Music! 7 (2011)
8. Now That's What I Call Music! 8 (2012)
9. Now That's What I Call Music! 9 Dance Edition (2012)
10. Now That's What I Call Music! 10 (2012)
11. Now That's What I Call Music! 11 Dance Edition (2013)

=== Special Editions ===
1. Now That's What I Call Music! Hits 2009 (2009)
2. Now That's What I Call Music! Dance 1 (2009)
3. Now That's What I Call Music! Dance 2 (2010)
4. NOW – That's What I Call Music! White Christmas (2010)
5. Now That's What I Call Music! Hits 2010 (2010)
6. Now That's What I Call Music! Hits 2011 (2011)
7. God Jul – Now That's What I Call Music! (2011)
8. Now That's What I Call Music! Woman (2011)
9. Now That's What I Call Music! Hits 2012 (2012)

== Poland ==
=== Original Series ===
1. Now to Jest Twoja Muzyka! 01
2. Now to Jest Twoja Muzyka! 02
3. Now to Jest Twoja Muzyka! 03
4. Now to Jest Twoja Muzyka! 04 (1998)
5. Now to Jest Twoja Muzyka! 05 (13 November 1998)
6. Now to Jest Twoja Muzyka! 06 (16 August 1999)
7. Now to Jest Twoja Muzyka! 07 (1999)
8. Now to Jest Twoja Muzyka! 08 (11 November 2000)

=== Season Series ===
1. Now Spring & Summer 2008! (2008)

=== Current series ===
1. Now That's What I Call Music! 01 (2010)
2. Now That's What I Call Music! 02 (2011)

== Portugal ==
=== Original Series ===
1. Now 99 (6 December 1999)
2. Now 2 (17 July 2000)
3. Now 3 (4 December 2000)
4. Now 4 (6 June 2001)
5. Now 5 (28 November 2001)
6. Now 6 (6 June 2002)
7. Now 7 (28 November 2002)
8. Now 8 (6 June 2003)
9. Now 9 (24 November 2003)
10. Now 10 (6 June 2004)
11. Now 11 (26 November 2004)
12. Now 12 (6 June 2005)
13. Now 13 (21 November 2005)
14. Now 14 (6 June 2006)
15. Now 15 (20 November 2006)
16. Now 16 (2 July 2007)
17. Now 17 (2 December 2007)
18. Now 18 (23 June 2008)
19. Now 19 (24 November 2008)
20. Now 20 (29 June 2009)
21. Now 21 (16 November 2009)
22. Now 22 (21 June 2010)
23. Now 23 (22 November 2010)
24. Now 24 (20 June 2011)
25. Now 25 (14 November 2011)
26. Now 26 (10 June 2012)
27. Now 27 (19 November 2012)
28. Now 28 (5 December 2013)
29. Now 29 (2014)
30. Now 30 (2015)
31. Now 31 (2016)
32. Now 32 (2017)
33. Now 33 (2018)
34. Now 34 (2019)
35. Now 35 (2020)
36. Now 36 (2021)

=== Dance Series ===
1. Now Dance (18 September 2001)
2. Now Dance 2 (7 October 2002)
3. Now Dance 2004 (3 May 2004)
4. Now Dance 2005 (2 May 2005)
5. Now Dance 2007 (19 February 2007)
6. Now Dance 2008 (5 May 2008)

=== Mix Series ===
1. Now Mix 2010 (26 April 2010)
2. Now Mix 2 (3 October 2010)
3. Now Mix 3 - Mixed by Wise Guys (18 April 2011)

=== Special Editions ===
1. Now DVD (24 February 2003)
2. Now 10 Anos - Os Maiores Êxitos da Última Década (30 November 2009)

== Saudi Arabia ==
1. Now That's What I Call Arabia (2000)
2. Now That's What I Call Arabia 2 (2001)
3. Now That's What I Call Arabia 3 (2001)
4. Now That's What I Call Arabia 4 (2002)
5. Now That's What I Call Arabia 5 (2003)
6. Now That's What I Call Arabia 6 (2004)
7. Now That's What I Call Arabia 7 (2004)
8. Now That's What I Call Arabia 8 (2005)
9. Now That's What I Call Arabia 9 (2006)
10. Now That's What I Call Arabia 10 (2007)
11. Now That's What I Call Arabia 11 (2008)
12. Now That's What I Call Arabia 12 (2010)
13. Now That's What I Call Arabia 13 (2011)

== South Africa ==
1. Now That's What I Call Music! (1984)
2. Now That's What I Call Music! II (1984)
3. Now That's What I Call Music! 3 (1985)
4. Now That's What I Call Music! 4 (1986)
5. Now That's What I Call Music! 5 (1986)
6. Now That's What I Call Music! 6 (1987)
7. Now That's What I Call Music! 7 (1987)
8. Now That's What I Call Music! 8 (1988)
9. Now That's What I Call Music! 9 (1988)
10. Now That's What I Call Music! 10 (1989)
11. Now That's What I Call Music! 11 (1989)
12. Now That's What I Call Music! 12 (1990)
13. Now That's What I Call Music! 13 (1990)
14. Now That's What I Call Music! 14 (1991)
15. Now That's What I Call Music! 15 (1991)
16. Now That's What I Call Music! 16 (1992)
17. Now That's What I Call Music! 17 (1992)
18. Now That's What I Call Music! 18 (1993)
19. Now That's What I Call Music! 19 (1993)
20. Now That's What I Call Music! 20 (1994)
21. Now That's What I Call Music! 21 (1995)
22. Now That's What I Call Music! 22 (1996)
23. Now That's What I Call Music! 23 The Superhit Collection (1997)
24. Now That's What I Call Music! 24 (1998)
25. Now That's What I Call Music! 25 (1999)
26. Now That's What I Call Music! 26 (1999)
27. Now That's What I Call Music! 27 (2000)
28. Now That's What I Call Music! 28 (2000)
29. Now That's What I Call Music! 29 (2001)
30. Now That's What I Call Music! 30 (2001)
31. Now That's What I Call Music! 31 (2001)
32. Now That's What I Call Music! 32 (2002)
33. Now That's What I Call Music! 33 (2002)
34. Now That's What I Call Music! 34 (2003)
35. Now That's What I Call Music! 35 (2003)
36. Now That's What I Call Music! 36 (2004)
37. Now That's What I Call Music! 37 (2004)
38. Now That's What I Call Music! 38 (2004)
39. Now That's What I Call Music! 39 (2005)
40. Now That's What I Call Music! 40 (2005)
41. Now That's What I Call Music! 41 (2005)
42. Now That's What I Call Music! 42 (2006)
43. Now That's What I Call Music! 43 (2006)
44. Now That's What I Call Music! 44 (2006)
45. Now That's What I Call Music! 45 (9 April 2007)
46. Now That's What I Call Music! 46 (2007)
47. Now That's What I Call Music! 47 (2007)
48. Now That's What I Call Music! 48 (2008)
49. Now That's What I Call Music! 49 (2008)
50. Now That's What I Call Music! 50 (2008)
51. Now That's What I Call Music! 51 (2009)
52. Now That's What I Call Music! 52 (2009)
53. Now That's What I Call Music! 53 (2009)
54. Now That's What I Call Music! 54 (25 March 2010)
55. Now That's What I Call Music! 55 (2010)
56. Now That's What I Call Music! 56 (2010)
57. Now That's What I Call Music! 57 (2011)
58. Now That's What I Call Music! 58 (8 July 2011)
59. Now That's What I Call Music! 59 (7 November 2011)
60. Now That's What I Call Music! 60 (2012)
61. Now That's What I Call Music! 61 (2012)
62. Now That's What I Call Music! 62 (2012)
63. Now That's What I Call Music! 63 (2013)
64. Now That's What I Call Music! 64 (2013)
65. Now That's What I Call Music! 65 (2013)
66. Now That's What I Call Music! 66 (February 2014)
67. Now That's What I Call Music! 67 (2014)
68. Now That's What I Call Music! 68 (2014)
69. Now That's What I Call Music! 69 (2015)
70. Now That's What I Call Music! 70 (2015)
71. Now That's What I Call Music! 71 (2015)
72. Now That's What I Call Music! 72 (2016)
73. Now That's What I Call Music! 73 (2016)
74. Now That's What I Call Music! 74 (2016)
75. Now That's What I Call Music! 75 (2017)
76. Now That's What I Call Music! 76 (2017)
77. Now That's What I Call Music! 77 (2017)
78. Now That's What I Call Music! 78 (2018)
79. Now That's What I Call Music! 79 (2018)
80. Now That's What I Call Music! 80 (2018)
81. Now That's What I Call Music! 81 (2019)
82. Now That's What I Call Music! 82 (2019)
83. Now That's What I Call Music! 83 (2020)^{[B]}

=== Best of Series ===
1. Now That's What I Call Music! The Best of '95 (1995)
2. Now That's What I Call Music! The Best of 10 Years (1995)
3. Now That's What I Call Music! The Best of '96 (1996)
4. Now That's What I Call Music! 1997 (1997)
5. Now That's What I Call Music! Years: The Best of 1995-2005 (2005)
6. Now That's What I Call Noughties: The Best of Now 2000-2007 (2008)
7. Now That's What I Call a No 1 (the greatest no. 1 hits from 1984 - 2014) (2014)
8. Now That's What I Call 21st Century (2015)
9. Now That's What I Call 20th Century (2018)
10. Now That's What I Call a Decade 2010 - 2019 (2019)
11. Now That's What I Call a Decade 2000 - 2009 (2020)

=== Now and Then Series ===
1. Now That's What I Call Music! And Then (2002)
2. Now That's What I Call Music! And Then Volume 2 (2003)

=== Special Editions ===
1. Now That's What I Call Classical (2011)
2. Now That's What I Call Country (2012)
3. Now That's What I Call Dance (2012)
4. Now That's What I Call Xmas (2012)
5. Now That's What I Call Dance 2 (2013)
6. Now That's What I Call R&B (2013)
7. Now That's What I Call Dance 3 (2013)
8. Now That's What I Call a Power Ballad (2013)
9. Now That's What I Call Movies (2014)
10. Now That's What I Call Country 2 (2014)
11. Now That's What I Call Dance 4 (2014)
12. Now That's What I Call the 80's (2014)
13. Now That's What I Call Dance 5 (2014)
14. Now That's What I Call Dance 6 (2015)
15. Now That's What I Call the 90's (2015)
16. Now That's What I Call Dance 7 (2015)
17. Now That's What I Call Legends (2015)
18. Now That's What I Call a Song (2016)
19. Now That's What I Call Dance 8 (2016)
20. Now That's What I Call a Summer Party (2016)
21. Now That's What I Call Dance 9 (2016)
22. Now That's What I Call a Rock Ballad (2017)
23. Now That's What I Call Dance 10 (2017)
24. Now That's What I Call a Roadtrip (2017)
25. Now That's What I Call Dance 11 (2017)
26. Now That's What I Call a Singer (2018)
27. Now That's What I Call a Summer Holiday (2018)
28. Now That's What I Call Dance 12 (2018)
29. Now That's What I Call 80s Pop (2019)
30. Now That's What I Call Dance 13 (2019)

=== DVD Series ===
1. Now That's What I Call Music! The DVD (2005)
2. Now That's What I Call Music! The DVD Vol.2 (2005)
3. Now That's What I Call Music! The DVD Vol.3 (2006)
4. Now That's What I Call Music! The DVD Vol.4 (2006)
5. Now That's What I Call Music! The DVD Vol.5 (2006)
6. Now That's What I Call Music! The DVD Vol.6 (2007)
7. Now That's What I Call Music! The DVD Vol.7 (2007)
8. Now That's What I Call Music! The DVD Vol.8 (2007)
9. Now That's What I Call Music! The DVD Vol.9 (2008)
10. Now That's What I Call Music! The DVD Vol.10 (2008)
11. Now That's What I Call Music! The DVD Vol.11 (2008)
12. Now That's What I Call Music! The DVD Vol.12 (2009)
13. Now That's What I Call Music! The DVD Vol.13 (2009)
14. Now That's What I Call Music! The DVD Vol.14 (2009)
15. Now That's What I Call Music! The DVD Vol.15 (2010)
16. Now That's What I Call Music! The DVD Vol.16 (2010)
17. Now That's What I Call Music! The DVD Vol.17 (2010)
18. Now That's What I Call Music! The DVD Vol.18 (2011)
19. Now That's What I Call Music! The DVD Vol.19 (2011)
20. Now That's What I Call Music! The DVD Vol.20 (2011)
21. Now That's What I Call Music! The DVD Vol.21 (2012)
22. Now That's What I Call Music! The DVD Vol.22 (2012)
23. Now That's What I Call Music! The DVD Vol.23 (2012)
24. Now That's What I Call Music! The DVD Vol.24 (2013)
25. Now That's What I Call Music! The DVD Vol.25 (2013)
26. Now That's What I Call Music! The DVD Vol.26 (2013)
27. Now That's What I Call Music! The DVD Vol.27 (2014)
28. Now That's What I Call Music! The DVD Vol.28 (2014)
29. Now That's What I Call Music! The DVD Vol.29 (2014)
30. Now That's What I Call Music! The DVD Vol.30 (2015)
31. Now That's What I Call Music! The DVD 2015 (2015)
32. Now That's What I Call Music! The DVD 2016 (2016)

== Spain ==
=== Original Series ===
1. Now Esto si es música I (1984)
2. Now Esto si es música 2 (1985)
3. Now Esto si es música 3 (1986)
4. Now Esto si es música 4 (1987)
5. Now Esto si es música 5 (1988)
6. Now Esto si es música 6 (1989)
7. Now Esto si es musica 7 (1990)
8. Now Esto si es musica 8 (1991)
9. Now Esto si es musica 9 (1992)
10. Now Esto si es musica 10 (1993)

=== Second Series ===
1. Now Esto es música 1 (2002)
2. Now Esto es música 2003 (2003)
3. Now Esto es musica 2004 (2004)
4. Now Esto es musica 2005 (2005)
5. Now Esto es musica 2006 (2006)
6. Now Los Éxitos Del Año 2014

== Turkey ==
=== Original Series ===
1. Now That's What I Call Music! 1 (1999)
2. Now That's What I Call Music! 2 (2000)
3. Now That's What I Call Music! 3 (2000)
4. Now That's What I Call Music! 4 (2000)
5. Now That's What I Call Music! 5 (2000)
6. Now That's What I Call Music! 6 (2000)

=== Second Series ===
1. Now That's What I Call Music! 2000 (2000)

=== The DVD Series ===
1. Now That's What I Call Arabia The DVD (2003)
2. Now That's What I Call Arabia The DVD 2 (2005)
3. Now That's What I Call Arabia The DVD 3 (2006)
4. Now That's What I Call Arabia The DVD 4 (2007)
5. Now That's What I Call Arabia The DVD 5 (2008)

=== Dance Series ===
1. Now Dance Arabia (2003)
2. Now Dance Arabia 2004 (2004)
3. Now Dance Arabia 2005 (2005)
4. Now Dance Arabia 2006 (2006)
5. Now Dance Arabia 2007 (2007)
6. Now Dance Arabia 2008 (2008)
7. Now Dance Arabia 2009 (2009)
8. Now Dance Arabia 2010 (2010)
9. Now Dance Arabia 2011 (2011)
10. Now Dance Arabia 2012 (2012)

=== Love Series ===
1. Now Love Arabia
2. Now Love Arabia 2 (2004)
3. Now That's What I Call Love Arabia 2006 (2006)
4. Now That's What I Call Love Arabia 2007 (2007)
5. Now That's What I Call Love Arabia 2008 (2008)
6. Now That's What I Call Love Arabia 2009 (2009)
7. Now That's What I Call Love Arabia 2010 (2010)
8. Now That's What I Call Love Arabia 2011 (2011)
9. The Best of Now That's What I Call Love Arabia

==== Love DVD Series ====
1. Now That's What I Call Love Arabia The DVD (2008)

=== Special Editions ===
1. Now That's What I Call Arabia 2000 (2000)
2. Now That's What I Call Arabia 2001 (2001)
3. Now That's What I Call Arabia 2002 (2002)
4. Now That's What I Call Arabia 2003 (2003)
5. Now That's What I Call Arabia 2004 (2004)
6. Now That's What I Call Arabia 2005 (5 July 2005)
7. Now That's What I Call Arabia 2005 Vol.2 (5 July 2005)
8. Now That's What I Call Arabia 2006 (2006)
9. Now That's What I Call Arabia 2007 (2007)
10. Now That's What I Call Arabia 2008 (2008)
11. Now That's What I Call Arabia 2009 (2009)
12. Now That's What I Call Arabia 2010 (2010)
13. Now That's What I Call Arabia 2011 (2011)
14. Now That's What I Call Arabia Decades 1990-2000
15. Now That's What I Call Arabia Decades 2000-2010
16. Now That's What I Call Arabia Decades 2000-2010 Volume Two

== Notes ==
- A After 61 volumes the series was released as streaming only and is currently up to Now 63
- B After 83 volumes the series was released as streaming only and is currently up to Now 93
