= Everybody Everywhere =

Live album by The Badloves
- Released: 1997
- Recorded: 1996
- Venue: The Continental Café, Melbourne
- Length: 55:43
- Label: Mushroom Records

The Badloves chronology
Holy Roadside (1995)	Everybody Everywhere (1997)	The Mushroom Tapes (2000)

Everybody Everywhere is the first live album released by Australian rock and pop band The Badloves. The album was recorded in 1996 and includes tracks from the band's two studio albums, Get On Board and Holy Roadside. The album was released in 1997, with a limited edition coming with a bonus VHS Holy Roadside - The Film.

== Track listing ==
No.	Title	Writer(s)	Length
1.	"Memphis"	Michael Spiby	4:41
2.	"Loves Me Like a Rock"		5:05
3.	"Caroline"	David Byrne; Spiby	3:14
4.	"I Remember"	Stephen Housden; Stephen O'Prey	3:40
5.	"Skin I'm In"	Spiby	3:39
6.	"Lost"	Spiby	4:49
7.	"Slave"	Spiby	5:27
8.	"Sugar Daddy"		9:10
9.	"Yesterday's Gone"		5:53
10.	"Instrumental"		3:01
11.	"Green Limousine"	Spiby	5:36
12.	"The Weight"	Robbie Robertson	6:59

== Charts ==
Chart (1997)	Peak position
Australia (ARIA)	82

== Release history ==
Country	Date	Format	Label	Catalogue
Australia	1997	CD, Cassette	Mushroom Records	D26206
Australia	1997	CD + VHS	Mushroom Records	D26206 + D26206
