= Hit Machine =

Australian compilation album series

Hit Machine was an Australian compilation album series produced and skewed by Festival Records, Mushroom Records (both labels folded today with Warner Bros. Records) BMG and Columbia Records (both labels folded today with Sony Music Australia), available in only Australia. It competed with 100% Hits, which started two years before, during its existence. It was released every three months and are mainly the biggest Top 40 hits of the season. It commenced in 1993 and ran 28 versions until 2000, where it was replaced by the So Fresh series. The replaced series uses the season-named format and includes songs from artists under Universal Music, which was previously included in 100% Hits series. Festival Records was folded to Warner Bros. Records, which managed the 100% Hits and NOW series with EMI. Sony Music Australia and Warner Bros. Records released digitally remastered versions of the entire Hit Machine series from 2015.

Every Hit Machine album since 1993 has gone to No. 1 on the ARIA Chart Compilation Albums chart. 10 of the Hit Machine compilations released have sold well over 140,000 copies (Double Platinum in Australia). They are the second most successful compilation albums in Australian music history apart from So Fresh.

== Discography ==
=== Hit Machine '93 ===
Hit Machine '93

Compilation album by Various artists
- Released: 5 July 1993
- Genre: Pop
- Label: BMG

1. Spin Doctors – "Two Princes" (4:03)
2. Jeremy Jordan – "The Right Kind of Love" (4:01)
3. Faith No More – "Easy" (3:06)
4. 2 Unlimited – "No Limit" (3:31)
5. Toni Pearen – "I Want You" (4:01)
6. Suede – "Metal Mickey" (2:59)
7. U.S.U.R.A. – "Open Your Mind" (Restricted Mix Edit) (3:40)
8. Take That – "Could It Be Magic" (Rapino Radio Mix) (3:28)
9. Sound Unlimited – "One More from the City" (4:34)
10. Depeche Mode – "I Feel You" (4:07)
11. Sonia Dada – "You Ain't Thinking (About Me)" (3:32)
12. Sade – "No Ordinary Love" (4:26)
13. Things of Stone and Wood – "Rock This Boat" (3:38)
14. Naughty by Nature – "Hip Hop Hooray" (3:59)
15. David Bowie – "Jump They Say" (3:51)
16. Jimmy Barnes – "Stand Up" (3:46)
17. Divinyls – "Wild Thing" (3:42)
18. Hunters & Collectors – "Holy Grail" (3:18)
19. Tumbleweed – "Sundial" (2:42)
20. The Black Sorrows – "Come On, Come On" (3:57)
21. The Beat Farmers – "Happy Boy" (1:21)

==== Certifications ====
Region	Certification	Certified units/sales
Australia (ARIA)	Platinum	70,000^{^}
^{^} Shipments figures based on certification alone.

=== Hit Machine 2 ===
Hit Machine 2

Compilation album by Various artists
- Released: 27 September 1993
- Genre: Pop
- Label: Columbia

1. Sub Sub featuring Melanie Williams – "Ain't No Love (Ain't No Use)" (2:46)
2. 2 Unlimited – "Tribal Dance" (4:33)
3. Terence Trent D'Arby – "She Kissed Me" (3:40)
4. Green Jellÿ – "Three Little Pigs" (4:35)
5. Rage Against the Machine – "Killing in the Name" (4:20)
6. Taylor Dayne – "Can't Get Enough of Your Love" (4:26)
7. Inner Circle – "Bad Boys" (3:40)
8. Freedom Williams – "Voice of Freedom" (House of Freedom Edit) (4:04)
9. Peter Andre – "Funky Junky" (3:34)
10. Ween – "Push th' Little Daisies" (2:51)
11. Baby Animals – "Don't Tell Me What to Do" (4:15)
12. Culture Beat – "Mr. Vain" (3:50)
13. Dannii Minogue – "This Is It" (3:35)
14. Captain Hollywood Project – "More and More" (4:11)
15. Jimmy Barnes – "Right by Your Side" (3:55)
16. Jeremy Jordan – "Wannagirl" (4:27)
17. Jo Beth Taylor – "A Prayer for Jane" (3:51)
18. Ace of Base – "All That She Wants" (3:32)
19. SWV – "I'm So into You" (3:48)
20. Rick Price – "Walk Away Renée" (4:26)

==== Certifications ====
Region	Certification	Certified units/sales
Australia (ARIA)	Platinum	70,000^{^}
^{^} Shipments figures based on certification alone.

=== Hit Machine 3 ===
Hit Machine 3

Compilation album by Various artists
- Released: 29 November 1993
- Genre: Pop
- Label: Festival

1. Urban Cookie Collective – "The Key the Secret" (3:44)
2. Soul Asylum – "Runaway Train" (4:26)
3. John Farnham – "Seemed Like a Good Idea (At the Time)" (4:18)
4. SWV – "Right Here" (3:47)
5. DJ BoBo – "Somebody Dance with Me" (3:33)
6. Haddaway – "What Is Love" (4:29)
7. Daryl Braithwaite – "The World As it Is" (3:49)
8. Hoodoo Gurus – "The Right Time" (3:54)
9. Girlfriend – "Heartbeat" (3:36)
10. Jon Stevens – "Going Down" (2:58)
11. Taylor Dayne – "Send Me a Lover" (4:27)
12. Baby Animals – "At the End of the Day" (2:50)
13. Deborah Conway – "Alive and Brilliant" (4:03)
14. Yothu Yindi – "World Turning" (4:29)
15. Cypress Hill – "Insane in the Brain" (3:33)
16. De La Soul – "Breakadawn" (4:16)
17. Ice Cube – "Check Yo Self" (3:56)
18. Died Pretty – "Harness Up" (4:07)
19. The Black Sorrows – "Stir It Up" (3:36)
20. Christine Anu and Paul Kelly – "Last Train" (4:20)

=== Hit Machine 4 ===
Hit Machine 4

Compilation album by Various artists
- Released: March 1994
- Genre: Pop
- Label: BMG

1. Twenty 4 Seven – "Slave to the Music" (Ultimate Dance Single Mix) (4:02)
2. The Badloves – "Green Limousine" (3:39)
3. M People – "Moving On Up" (M People Master Edit) (3:30)
4. Zhané – "Hey Mr. D.J." (4:08)
5. Baby Animals – "Lights Out at Eleven" (4:50)
6. E.Y.C. – "Feelin' Alright" (3:22)
7. Urban Cookie Collective – "Feels Like Heaven" (Maximum Edit) (3:24)
8. Jimmy Barnes and The Badloves – "The Weight" (4:25)
9. DJ Jazzy Jeff & The Fresh Prince – "Boom! Shake the Room" (3:42)
10. Culture Beat – "Got to Get It" (3:38)
11. Depeche Mode – "In Your Room" (4:39)
12. Take That – "Relight My Fire" (4:05)
13. 2 Unlimited – "Maximum Overdrive" (3:41)
14. Urge Overkill – "Sister Havana" (3:43)
15. Peter Andre – "Let's Get It On" (4:09)
16. Leftfield featuring John Lydon – "Open Up" (3:46)
17. Xscape – "Just Kickin' It" (3:25)
18. Ace of Base – "Happy Nation" (3:28)
19. Defryme – "Pure Killer" (4:04)
20. Funky Poets – "Born in the Ghetto" (4:18)

==== Certifications ====
Region	Certification	Certified units/sales
Australia (ARIA)	Platinum	70,000^{^}
^{^} Shipments figures based on certification alone.

=== Hit Machine 5 ===
Hit Machine 5

Compilation album by Various artists
- Released: 1994
- Genre: Pop
- Label: Columbia

1. Ace of Base – "The Sign" (3:10)
2. Jam & Spoon – "Right in the Night" (3:48)
3. Dr. Alban – "Sing Hallelujah" (3:53)
4. Doop – "Doop" (Sidney Berlin Ragtime Band) (3:09)
5. Take That – "Pray" (3:45)
6. Celine Dion – "The Power of Love" (4:48)
7. Pauline Henry – "Feel Like Makin' Love" (4:01)
8. Twenty 4 Seven – "Is It Love" (3:58)
9. Culture Shock – "Satisfy the Groove" (4:46)
10. M People – "Renaissance" (3:40)
11. Primal Scream – "Rocks" (3:36)
12. Tag Team – "Whoomp! (There It Is)" (3:44)
13. Defryme – "Mama Said Knock You Out" (3:24)
14. 3 the Hard Way – "Hip Hop Holiday" (3:40)
15. Culture Beat – "Anything" (3:57)
16. Peter Andre – "To the Top" (6:33)
17. E.Y.C. – "The Way You Work It" (3:00)
18. Jimmy Cliff – "I Can See Clearly Now" (3:16)
19. Hoodoo Gurus – "Less Than a Feeling" (Stadiumface Version) (3:37)
20. The Poor – "More Wine Waiter Please" (4:16)

==== Certifications ====
Region	Certification	Certified units/sales
Australia (ARIA)	Platinum	70,000^{^}
^{^} Shipments figures based on certification alone.

=== Hit Machine 6 ===
Hit Machine 6

Compilation album by Various artists
- Released: 1994
- Genre: Pop
- Label: Festival

1. The Grid – "Swamp Thing" (3:59)
2. Corona – "The Rhythm of the Night" (4:24)
3. Ace of Base – "Don't Turn Around" (3:50)
4. Des'ree – "You Gotta Be" (4:01)
5. Roachford – "Only to Be with You" (4:16)
6. Crash Test Dummies – "Mmm Mmm Mmm Mmm" (3:56)
7. Björn Again – "Flashdance... What a Feeling" (3:46)
8. Kym Mazelle and Jocelyn Brown – "No More Tears (Enough Is Enough)" (4:56)
9. Culture Shock – "My Enemy" (4:06)
10. Southend with Nik Fish – "The Winner Is..." (3:23)
11. Rockmelons – "Stronger Together" (3:50)
12. The Prodigy – "No Good (Start the Dance)" (3:59)
13. Vika and Linda – "When Will You Fall for Me" (3:47)
14. Elastic – "Caution to the Wind" (3:47)
15. C.J. Lewis – "Sweets for My Sweet" (3:24)
16. The Black Sorrows – "Snake Skin Shoes" (3:24)
17. Defryme – "Sanity" (3:46)
18. The Truth – "My Heavy Friend" (3:48)
19. Jam & Spoon – "Find Me (Odyssey to Anyoona)" (4:02)
20. Frente! – "Bizarre Love Triangle" (2:01)

==== Certifications ====
Region	Certification	Certified units/sales
Australia (ARIA)	Gold	35,000^{^}
^{^} Shipments figures based on certification alone.

=== Hit Machine 7 ===
Hit Machine 7

Compilation album by Various artists
- Released: 1994
- Genre: Pop
- Label: Columbia

1. Kylie Minogue – "Confide in Me" (4:26)
2. C+C Music Factory – "Do You Wanna Get Funky" (3:42)
3. The Prodigy – "Voodoo People" (3:20)
4. Boom Crash Opera – "Gimme" (3:15)
5. Coolio – "Fantastic Voyage" (4:05)
6. Jaki Graham – "Ain't Nobody" (4:07)
7. Youssou N'Dour and Neneh Cherry – "7 Seconds" (4:44)
8. Lisa Loeb and Nine Stories – "Stay (I Missed You)" (3:04)
9. Toni Braxton – "Breathe Again" (4:30)
10. Jennifer Brown – "My Everything" (4:29)
11. Haddaway – "I Miss You" (4:14)
12. Toni Pearen – "Walkaway Lover" (4:18)
13. E.Y.C. – "Black Book" (3:46)
14. The Grid – "Rollercoaster" (3:32)
15. Roachford – "Lay Your Love on Me" (4:12)
16. Take That – "Love Ain't Here Anymore" (3:51)
17. Things of Stone and Wood – "Wildflowers" (3:41)
18. Nathan Cavaleri – "Workin' on It" (4:12)
19. Weezer – "Undone – The Sweater Song" (3:54)
20. Audio Murphy (featuring Melinda) – "Tighten Up Your Pants" (2:58)

==== Certifications ====
Region	Certification	Certified units/sales
Australia (ARIA)	Gold	35,000^{^}
^{^} Shipments figures based on certification alone.

=== Hit Machine 8 ===
Hit Machine 8

Compilation album by Various artists
- Released: 1995
- Genre: Pop
- Label: BMG

1. Real McCoy – "Another Night" (3:57)
2. 20 Fingers featuring Gillette – "Short Dick Man" (4:18)
3. Arrow – "Hot Hot Hot" (3:36)
4. Gloria Estefan – "Turn the Beat Around" (3:52)
5. Nicki French – "Total Eclipse of the Heart" (3:49)
6. Edwyn Collins – "A Girl Like You" (3:55)
7. Kylie Minogue – "Put Yourself in My Place" (3:35)
8. Tina Arena – "Chains" (4:00)
9. CDB – "Hook Me Up" (3:45)
10. Londonbeat – "Come Back" (3:51)
11. M People – "Sight for Sore Eyes" (3:55)
12. Severed Heads – "Dead Eyes Opened" (3:47)
13. Supergroove – "Can't Get Enough" (3:22)
14. Ween – "Voodoo Lady" (3:47)
15. Boom Crash Opera – "Tongue Tied" (2:53)
16. Headless Chickens – "Cruise Control" (3:46)
17. Newton – "Sky High" (3:56)
18. GF4 – "Sooner or Later" (3:47)
19. Technotronic featuring Ya Kid K – "Move It to the Rhythm" (3:51)
20. Rednex – "Cotton Eye Joe" (3:20)

==== Certifications ====
Region	Certification	Certified units/sales
Australia (ARIA)	Platinum	70,000^{^}
^{^} Shipments figures based on certification alone.

=== Hit Machine 9 ===
Hit Machine 9

Compilation album by Various artists
- Released: 1995
- Genre: Pop
- Label: Festival

1. Tokyo Ghetto Pussy – "Everybody on the Floor (Pump It)" (3:37)
2. The Outhere Brothers – "Don't Stop (Wiggle Wiggle)" (3:06)
3. N-Trance – "Set You Free" (4:21)
4. Corona – "Baby Baby" (3:44)
5. Real McCoy – "Run Away" (3:53)
6. M People – "Open Your Heart" (3:40)
7. Rednex – "Old Pop in an Oak" (3:32)
8. Take That – "Back for Good" (4:01)
9. Christine Anu – "Island Home" (3:49)
10. CDB – "Hey Girl" (3:40)
11. Merril Bainbridge – "Mouth" (3:26)
12. Ini Kamoze – "Here Comes the Hotstepper" (4:10)
13. Mental As Anything – "Mr. Natural" (3:58)
14. Faith No More – "Digging the Grave" (3:05)
15. Heather Nova – "Walk This World" (3:49)
16. Jimmy Barnes – "Change of Heart" (4:01)
17. The Murmurs – "You Suck" (3:15)
18. Divinyls – "I'm Jealous" (4:12)
19. Tina Arena – "Sorrento Moon (I Remember)" (4:48)
20. Annie Lennox – "No More I Love You's" (4:48)

==== Certifications ====
Region	Certification	Certified units/sales
Australia (ARIA)	Platinum	70,000^{^}
^{^} Shipments figures based on certification alone.

=== Hit Machine 10 ===
Hit Machine 10

Compilation album by Various artists
- Released: 1995
- Genre: Pop
- Label: Columbia

1. Diana King – "Shy Guy" (4:20)
2. Real McCoy – "Love & Devotion" (3:57)
3. Strike – "U Sure Do" (Strike 7" Mix) (3:50)
4. Interactive – "Forever Young" (3:42)
5. F.C.B. – "Excalibur" (3:55)
6. Herbie – "Right Type of Mood" (3:12)
7. Corona – "Try Me Out" (3:26)
8. Alex Party – "Don't Give Me Your Life" (Dancing Divas Edit) (3:10)
9. M People – "Search for the Hero" (M People Radio Mix) (4:11)
10. A.K. Soul – "I Like It" (3:21)
11. Christine Anu – "Party" (3:03)
12. Supergroove – "You Gotta Know" (3:37)
13. Strawpeople – "Trick with a Knife" (4:54)
14. Faith No More – "Evidence" (3:55)
15. Tina Arena – "Heaven Help My Heart" (5:29)
16. Rick Price – "River of Love" (4:43)
17. Margaret Urlich – "Gonna Make You Mine" (4:10)
18. Jodeci – "Freek'n You" (4:18)
19. Scatman John – "Scatman (Ski Ba Bop Ba Dop Bop)" (3:33)
20. The Steppers – "Alice, Who the F..k Is Alice?" (4:00)

Note: An entry form was included for a chance to win 1 of 5 prize packs, including a PlayStation and 3 video games.

==== Certifications ====
Region	Certification	Certified units/sales
Australia (ARIA)	Platinum	70,000^{^}
^{^} Shipments figures based on certification alone.

=== Hit Machine 11 ===
Hit Machine 11

Compilation album by Various artists
- Released: 1995
- Genre: Pop
- Label: BMG

1. N-Trance – "Stayin' Alive" (4:04)
2. Real McCoy – "Come and Get Your Love" (3:12)
3. Peter Andre – "Mysterious Girl" (3:45)
4. Nick Cave and the Bad Seeds and Kylie Minogue – "Where the Wild Roses Grow" (3:56)
5. Oasis – "Morning Glory" (5:01)
6. Sophie B. Hawkins – "As I Lay Me Down" (3:58)
7. Take That – "Never Forget" (5:31)
8. The Badloves – "Caroline" (3:03)
9. The Outhere Brothers – "Boom Boom Boom" (3:21)
10. Scatman John – "Scatman's World" (3:39)
11. Herbie – "I Believe" (3:34)
12. Tokyo Ghetto Pussy – "I Kiss Your Lips" (3:51)
13. La Bouche – "Be My Lover" (4:00)
14. Jaki Graham – "Absolute E-Sensual" (4:15)
15. Hoops Inc. – "Joy" (3:02)
16. Kylie Minogue – "Where Is the Feeling?" (4:10)
17. Garbage – "Vow" (4:26)
18. Jimmy Barnes – "Come Undone" (3:41)
19. Mental As Anything – "Whole Wide World" (2:51)
20. The Vaughans – "Who Farted?" (3:15)

==== Certifications ====
Region	Certification	Certified units/sales
Australia (ARIA)	2× Platinum	140,000^{^}
^{^} Shipments figures based on certification alone.

=== Hit Machine 12 ===
Hit Machine 12

Compilation album by Various artists
- Released: 1996
- Genre: Pop
- Label: Festival

1. Oasis – "Wonderwall" (4:20)
2. TLC – "Waterfalls" (4:40)
3. Dreamworld – "Movin' Up" (3:38)
4. Swoop – "Apple Eyes" (3:24)
5. Real McCoy – "Automatic Lover (Call for Love)" (3:47)
6. CDB – "Let's Groove" (4:17)
7. Deni Hines – "It's Alright" (3:46)
8. M People – "Itchycoo Park" (3:51)
9. The Outhere Brothers – "La La La Hey Hey" (3:16)
10. Coolio – "Too Hot" (3:40)
11. Pizzaman – "Happiness" (3:26)
12. Kate Ceberano – "Change" (4:00)
13. Garbage – "Queer" (4:03)
14. Tina Arena – "Wasn't It Good" (4:11)
15. Tatjana – "Santa Maria" (3:20)
16. R. Kelly – "You Remind Me of Something" (4:11)
17. Sophie B. Hawkins – "Right Beside You" (3:59)
18. N-Trance – "Electronic Pleasure" (3:51)
19. DJ Darren Briais vs. Peewee Ferris – "I Feel It" (4:10)
20. Right Said Fred – "Living on a Dream" (3:44)

==== Certifications ====
Region	Certification	Certified units/sales
Australia (ARIA)	Platinum	70,000^{^}
^{^} Shipments figures based on certification alone.

=== Hit Machine 13 ===
Hit Machine 13

Compilation album by Various artists
- Released: 1996
- Genre: Pop
- Label: Columbia

1. Triple X – "The X-Files" (3:24)
2. The Prodigy – "Firestarter" (3:47)
3. La Bouche – "Sweet Dreams" (3:11)
4. Alex Party – "Wrap Me Up" (3:49)
5. Max-A-Million – "Sexual Healing" (3:25)
6. TLC – "Diggin' on You" (4:14)
7. CDB – "Don't Stop" (3:44)
8. Robert Miles – "Children" (4:04)
9. Take That – "How Deep Is Your Love" (3:41)
10. Deni Hines – "Imagination" (4:07)
11. Human Nature – "Got It Goin' On" (3:54)
12. Oasis – "Don't Look Back in Anger" (4:49)
13. Coolio – "1, 2, 3, 4 (Sumpin' New)" (3:34)
14. Peter Andre – "Get Down on It" (3:52)
15. Groove Theory – "Tell Me" (3:57)
16. A.K. Soul – "Show You Love" (4:18)
17. Garbage – "Stupid Girl" (4:20)
18. Skee-Lo – "I Wish" (4:10)
19. Hoodoo Gurus – "Waking Up Tired" (2:55)
20. PJ & Duncan – "Stepping Stone" (3:02)

==== Certifications ====
Region	Certification	Certified units/sales
Australia (ARIA)	Platinum	70,000^{^}
^{^} Shipments figures based on certification alone.

=== Hit Machine 14 ===
Hit Machine 14

Compilation album by Various artists
- Released: 1996
- Genre: Pop
- Label: BMG

1. Los del Río – "Macarena" (3:43)
2. Fugees – "Killing Me Softly" (4:59)
3. Garbage – "Only Happy When It Rains" (3:46)
4. La Bouche – "I Love to Love" (4:01)
5. 3T – "Anything" (4:14)
6. The Presidents of the United States of America – "Kitty" (3:22)
7. Oasis – "Champagne Supernova" (4:37)
8. Bone Thugs-n-Harmony – "Tha Crossroads" (3:38)
9. K's Choice – "Not an Addict" (4:46)
10. Human Nature – "Tellin' Everybody" (3:55)
11. Amanda Marshall – "Let It Rain" (4:19)
12. Robert Miles – "Fable" (3:51)
13. Eclipse – "The Look of Love" (3:22)
14. Deborah Cox – "Who Do U Love" (3:44)
15. Newton – "Sometimes When We Touch" (4:03)
16. Deni Hines – "I Like the Way" (3:31)
17. Coolio – "It's All the Way Live (Now)" (3:32)
18. Divinyls – "Human on the Inside" (3:43)
19. Past to Present – "September" (3:22)
20. Los del Mar – "Macarena" (3:49)

==== Certifications ====
Region	Certification	Certified units/sales
Australia (ARIA)	2× Platinum	140,000^{^}
^{^} Shipments figures based on certification alone.

=== Hit Machine 15 ===
Hit Machine 15

Compilation album by Various artists
- Released: 1996
- Genre: Pop
- Label: Festival

1. No Mercy – "Where Do You Go" (4:18)
2. Underworld – "Born Slippy .NUXX" (3:44)
3. Strike – "Inspiration" (4:24)
4. Dead or Alive – "You Spin Me Round (Like a Record)" ('96 Remix) (3:39)
5. Jimmy Barnes – "Lover Lover" (3:27)
6. Puff Johnson – "Forever More" (4:05)
7. Babybird – "You're Gorgeous" (3:45)
8. La Bouche – "Fallin' in Love" (3:31)
9. Deni Hines – "I'm Not in Love" (4:14)
10. John Farnham – "Heart's on Fire" (4:47)
11. Oasis – "Roll with It" (4:00)
12. Backstreet Boys – "Get Down (You're the One for Me)" (3:34)
13. Jamiroquai – "Virtual Insanity" (4:05)
14. Shield – "A God That Can Dance" (3:25)
15. Apollo 440 – "Krupa" (4:02)
16. Jon Stevens – "When?" (4:23)
17. Peter Andre – "Flava" (3:58)
18. Ash – "Oh Yeah" (4:46)
19. Primitive Radio Gods – "Standing Outside a Broken Phone Booth with Money in My Hand" (4:34)
20. Unique II – "Break My Stride" (3:16)

==== Certifications ====
Region	Certification	Certified units/sales
Australia (ARIA)	Platinum	70,000^{^}
^{^} Shipments figures based on certification alone.

=== Hit Machine 16 ===
Hit Machine 16

Compilation album by Various artists
- Released: 1997
- Genre: Pop
- Label: Columbia

1. The Prodigy – "Breathe" (3:59)
2. Az Yet – "Last Night" (4:26)
3. Ginuwine – "Pony" (4:13)
4. Whigfield – "Sexy Eyes" (3:59)
5. Human Nature – "Wishes" (4:11)
6. Celine Dion – "It's All Coming Back to Me Now" (5:30)
7. Amber – "This Is Your Night" (3:59)
8. Bloodhound Gang – "Fire Water Burn" (4:11)
9. Puff Johnson – "Over and Over" (3:58)
10. Fools Garden – "Lemon Tree" (3:11)
11. 3T – "I Need You" (3:56)
12. Depeche Mode – "Barrel of a Gun" (5:23)
13. Jamiroquai – "Cosmic Girl" (Classic Mix) (3:46)
14. Crush – "Jellyhead" (4:22)
15. Backstreet Boys – "Quit Playing Games (with My Heart)" (3:54)
16. Sheryl Lee Ralph – "In the Evening" (4:07)
17. Newton – "We're All Alone" (3:43)
18. Lisa Stansfield vs. The Dirty Rotten Scoundrels – "People Hold On" (3:41)
19. Sash! – "Encore une fois" (3:38)

==== Certifications ====
Region	Certification	Certified units/sales
Australia (ARIA)	2× Platinum	140,000^{^}
^{^} Shipments figures based on certification alone.

=== Hit Machine 17 ===
Hit Machine 17

Compilation album by Various artists
- Released: 1997
- Genre: Pop
- Label: BMG

1. Toni Braxton – "Un-Break My Heart" (4:26)
2. No Mercy – "When I Die" (4:29)
3. Human Nature – "Don't Say Goodbye" (4:22)
4. Real McCoy – "One More Time" (3:46)
5. Whigfield – "Gimme Gimme" (4:03)
6. Blue Boy – "Remember Me" (3:58)
7. Des'ree – "Kissing You" (4:54)
8. Smoke City – "Underwater Love" (3:56)
9. Faithless – "Insomnia" (3:34)
10. Puff Daddy – "Can't Nobody Hold Me Down" (4:21)
11. Depeche Mode – "It's No Good" (4:06)
12. Lisa Stansfield – "The Real Thing" (3:59)
13. DJ Kool – "Let Me Clear My Throat" (4:21)
14. Space – "Female of the Species" (3:19)
15. Dead or Alive – "Sex Drive" (4:14)
16. Paul Kelly – "Tease Me" (4:04)
17. Skunkhour – "Breathing Through My Eyes" (4:12)
18. The Notorious B.I.G. – "Hypnotize" (3:51)
19. Lisa Maxwell – "Thinking of You" (3:42)

==== Certifications ====
Region	Certification	Certified units/sales
Australia (ARIA)	Gold	35,000^{^}
^{^} Shipments figures based on certification alone.

=== Hit Machine 18 ===
Hit Machine 18

Compilation album by Various artists
- Released: 1997
- Genre: Pop
- Label: Columbia

Disc 1

1. Puff Daddy featuring Faith Evans – "I'll Be Missing You" (5:09)
2. Tina Arena – "Burn" (4:25)
3. Leonardo's Bride – "Even When I'm Sleeping" (3:54)
4. Oasis – "D'You Know What I Mean?" (7:24)
5. No Mercy – "Please Don't Go" (4:19)
6. No Doubt – "Sunday Morning" (4:30)
7. Real McCoy – "I Wanna Come (With You)" (3:30)
8. Olive – "You're Not Alone" (4:12)
9. Shawn Colvin – "Sunny Came Home" (4:24)
10. Amanda Marshall – "Dark Horse" (4:31)
11. Diana ah Naid – "I Go Off" (3:15)
12. Paul Kelly – "It Started with a Kiss" (4:16)
13. Gary Barlow – "So Help Me Girl" (4:29)
14. Wendy Matthews – "Big" (3:34)
15. Smoke City – "Mr. Gorgeous (and Miss Curvaceous)" (4:06)

Disc 2

1. Az Yet – "Hard to Say I'm Sorry" (3:18)
2. Diana King – "I Say a Little Prayer" (3:36)
3. Human Nature – "Whisper Your Name" (3:48)
4. Coolio – "C U When U Get There" (5:08)
5. 2Pac and The Notorious B.I.G. – "Runnin' from tha Police" (4:33)
6. Backstreet Boys – "Everybody (Backstreet's Back)" (3:45)
7. The Verve Pipe – "The Freshmen" (4:30)
8. Skunkhour – "Weightlessness" (3:58)
9. Jamiroquai – "Alright" (3:43)
10. Damage – "Wonderful Tonight" (3:47)
11. Robyn – "Do You Know (What It Takes)" (3:33)
12. Vertigo – "Forever Lately" (4:18)
13. Mark Seymour – "Last Ditch Cabaret" (4:08)
14. Joe – "Don't Wanna Be a Player" (4:20)
15. Jane Jensen – "More Than I Can" (3:36)

Note: Only CD to have 2 discs.

==== Certifications ====
Region	Certification	Certified units/sales
Australia (ARIA)	2× Platinum	140,000^{^}
^{^} Shipments figures based on certification alone.

=== Hit Machine 19 ===
Hit Machine 19

Compilation album by Various artists
- Released: 1998
- Genre: Pop
- Label: Sony

1. Backstreet Boys – "As Long as You Love Me" (3:42)
2. Run–D.M.C. vs. Jason Nevins – "It's Like That" (4:11)
3. Aqua – "Barbie Girl" (3:16)
4. Kylie Minogue – "Did It Again" (4:23)
5. Trisha Yearwood – "How Do I Live" (4:03)
6. Human Nature – "People Get Ready" (3:09)
7. Da Hool – "Meet Her at the Love Parade" (3:33)
8. The Notorious B.I.G. – "Mo Money Mo Problems" (4:12)
9. Sash! – "Stay" (3:32)
10. Burnette – "Beachball" (3:47)
11. Coolio – "Ooh La La" (4:08)
12. No Mercy – "Kiss You All Over" (4:31)
13. Monique Brumby – "The Change in Me" (4:16)
14. Tina Arena – "If I Didn't Love You" (4:38)
15. Imani Coppola – "Legend of a Cowgirl" (3:45)
16. Peter Andre – "All About Us" (4:26)
17. Robyn – "Show Me Love" (3:30)
18. Leonardo's Bride – "Buddha Baby" (4:05)
19. CDB – "Good Times" (3:58)

==== Certifications ====
Region	Certification	Certified units/sales
Australia (ARIA)	Platinum	70,000^{^}
^{^} Shipments figures based on certification alone.

=== Hit Machine 20 ===
Hit Machine 20

Compilation album by Various artists
- Released: 1998
- Genre: Pop
- Label: BMG

1. Natalie Imbruglia – "Torn" (4:06)
2. Backstreet Boys – "All I Have to Give" (4:05)
3. Will Smith – "Gettin' Jiggy wit It" (3:49)
4. Steps – "5,6,7,8" (3:22)
5. Ricky Martin – "María" (3:14)
6. N.Y.C.C. – "Fight for Your Right (To Party)" (3:24)
7. Kylie Minogue – "Breathe" (3:40)
8. Allure – "All Cried Out" (3:43)
9. Next – "Too Close" (4:08)
10. Tina Arena – "Now I Can Dance" (4:06)
11. The Mavis's – "Cry" (4:09)
12. Kate Ceberano – "Pash" (3:36)
13. P.M. Dawn featuring Ky-Mani – "Gotta Be...Movin' on Up" (3:40)
14. Peter Andre featuring Warren G – "All Night, All Right" (3:28)
15. Run–D.M.C. vs. Jason Nevins – "It's Tricky" (3:46)
16. Blink-182 – "Dammit" (2:47)
17. Cornershop – "Brimful of Asha" (4:02)
18. The Whitlams – "No Aphrodisiac" (4:21)
19. Uncle Sam – "I Don't Ever Want to See You Again" (4:34)
20. Solid HarmoniE – "I'll Be There for You" (3:12)

==== Certifications ====
Region	Certification	Certified units/sales
Australia (ARIA)	Platinum	70,000^{^}
^{^} Shipments figures based on certification alone.

=== Hit Machine 21 ===
Hit Machine 21

Compilation album by Various artists
- Released: 1998
- Genre: Pop
- Label: Columbia

1. Ricky Martin – "The Cup of Life" (4:32)
2. Five – "When the Lights Go Out" (4:09)
3. S.O.A.P. – "This Is How We Party" (3:18)
4. Steps – "Last Thing on My Mind" (3:05)
5. K-Ci & JoJo – "All My Life" (3:42)
6. Aqua – "Turn Back Time" (4:07)
7. The Tamperer featuring Maya – "Feel It" (Blunt Edit) (3:15)
8. Merril Bainbridge – "Lonely" (3:34)
9. Dana International – "Diva" (3:01)
10. CDB – "Let It Whip" (3:44)
11. Paul Kelly – "Saturday Night and Sunday Morning" (4:04)
12. Kate Ceberano – "Love Is Alive" (3:23)
13. Billy Crawford – "Urgently in Love" (3:31)
14. Imajin – "Shorty (You Keep Playin' with My Mind)" (4:15)
15. Wendy Matthews – "Beloved" (4:13)
16. Bic Runga – "Sway" (4:23)
17. Ammonia – "Keep on My Side" (3:25)
18. Fini Scad – "It's Not Real" (3:15)
19. Wayne G featuring Stewart Who? – "Twisted" (Betty Ford Radio Edit) (3:49)
20. Sash! – "La Primavera" (3:36)
21. Renée Geyer – "I'm the Woman Who Loves You" (3:43)

=== Hit Machine 22 ===
Hit Machine 22

Compilation album by Various artists
- Released: 1998
- Genre: Pop
- Label: BMG

1. Bachelor Girl – "Buses and Trains" (3:43)
2. B*Witched – "C'est la Vie" (2:53)
3. Five – "Everybody Get Up" (3:05)
4. Natalie Imbruglia – "Big Mistake" (4:34)
5. Backstreet Boys – "I'll Never Break Your Heart" (4:25)
6. S.O.A.P. – "Ladidi Ladida" (3:02)
7. Human Nature – "Cruel" (4:26)
8. Cold Chisel – "The Things I Love in You" (3:21)
9. Mousse T. – "Horny '98" (3:07)
10. Next – "I Still Love You" (4:02)
11. Aaron Carter – "Crazy Little Party Girl" (3:26)
12. Popsie – "Single" (3:38)
13. Monica – "The First Night" (3:56)
14. Faithless – "God Is a DJ" (3:34)
15. Garbage – "I Think I'm Paranoid" (3:38)
16. Kylie Minogue – "Cowboy Style" (3:58)
17. Christian Fry – "You Got Me" (3:46)
18. Steps – "One for Sorrow" (4:21)
19. Redzone – "Jackie" (3:19)
20. Another Level – "Freak Me" (3:37)

==== Certifications ====
Region	Certification	Certified units/sales
Australia (ARIA)	Platinum	70,000^{^}
^{^} Shipments figures based on certification alone.

=== Hit Machine 23 ===
Hit Machine 23

Compilation album by Various artists
- Released: 1999
- Genre: Pop
- Label: Festival

1. B*Witched – "Rollercoaster" (3:25)
2. Stars on 54 – "If You Could Read My Mind" (3:27)
3. Five – "Got the Feelin'" (3:28)
4. Josh Abrahams and Amiel Daemion – "Addicted to Bass" (3:58)
5. Blondie – "Maria" (4:50)
6. Fatboy Slim – "The Rockafeller Skank" (4:01)
7. Natalie Imbruglia – "Wishing I Was There" (3:52)
8. Goo Goo Dolls – "Slide" (3:33)
9. Bachelor Girl – "Treat Me Good" (5:24)
10. The Tamperer featuring Maya – "If You Buy This Record (Your Life Will Be Better)" (3:31)
11. Touch and Go – "Would You...?" (3:11)
12. Cherry – "SOS" (3:25)
13. Jay-Z – "Hard Knock Life (Ghetto Anthem)" (4:00)
14. Faithless – "Take the Long Way Home" (4:08)
15. Deborah Cox – "Nobody's Supposed to Be Here" (Dance Mix) (4:15)
16. Garbage – "Special" (3:43)
17. Custard – "Girls Like That (Don't Go For Guys Like Us)" (3:12)
18. deadstar – "Run Baby Run" (3:30)
19. Suze DeMarchi – "Satellite" (4:23)
20. Cold Chisel – "Water into Wine" (4:54)

==== Certifications ====
Region	Certification	Certified units/sales
Australia (ARIA)	Gold	35,000^{^}
^{^} Shipments figures based on certification alone.

=== Hit Machine 24 ===
Hit Machine 24

Compilation album by Various artists
- Released: 1999
- Genre: Pop
- Label: Columbia

1. Steps, Tina Cousins, Cleopatra, B*Witched and Billie – "Thank ABBA for the Music" (4:08)
2. Five – "Until the Time Is Through" (4:15)
3. Human Nature – "Last to Know" (4:28)
4. Steps – "Heartbeat" (4:25)
5. Shawn Mullins – "Lullaby" (4:34)
6. B*Witched – "To You I Belong" (3:06)
7. Armand Van Helden – "You Don't Know Me" (4:03)
8. NSYNC – "Tearin' Up My Heart" (3:31)
9. 4 the Cause – "Stand by Me" (3:45)
10. Everlast – "What It's Like" (4:37)
11. Fatboy Slim – "Praise You" (3:48)
12. TQ – "Westside" (3:54)
13. Something for Kate – "Electricity" (3:41)
14. Soulsearcher – "Can't Get Enough" (3:29)
15. Gerling – "Enter, Space Capsule" (3:52)
16. Jennifer Paige – "Sober" (4:04)
17. Cherry – "I Want Your Love" (3:17)
18. Lavish – "Homosapien" (3:01)
19. S.O.A.P. – "Stand By You" (3:22)
20. Custard – "Hit Song" (2:23)

==== Certifications ====
Region	Certification	Certified units/sales
Australia (ARIA)	Gold	35,000^{^}
^{^} Shipments figures based on certification alone.

=== Hit Machine 25 ===
Hit Machine 25

Compilation album by Various artists
- Released: 1999
- Genre: Pop
- Label: BMG

1. Five – "If Ya Gettin' Down" (3:01)
2. Jennifer Lopez – "If You Had My Love" (3:47)
3. Shanks & Bigfoot – "Sweet like Chocolate" (3:28)
4. Sixpence None the Richer – "Kiss Me" (3:27)
5. TLC – "No Scrubs" (3:59)
6. Delerium – "Silence" (4:06)
7. Ricky Martin – "Livin' la Vida Loca" (4:02)
8. Vanessa Amorosi – "Have a Look" (3:35)
9. Britney Spears – "...Baby One More Time" (3:31)
10. Backstreet Boys – "I Want It That Way" (3:33)
11. Westlife – "Swear It Again" (4:06)
12. Human Nature – "Don't Cry" (5:12)
13. Whitney Houston – "Heartbreak Hotel" (4:06)
14. Ann Lee – "2 Times" (3:48)
15. Chicane – "Saltwater" (3:28)
16. ATB – "9 PM (Till I Come)" (3:16)
17. Monica – "Angel of Mine" (4:10)
18. NSYNC – "(God Must Have Spent) A Little More Time on You" (4:39)
19. Cherry – "Saddest Song" (4:18)
20. Kate Ceberano – "I Won't Let You Down" (4:32)

==== Certifications ====
Region	Certification	Certified units/sales
Australia (ARIA)	2× Platinum	140,000^{^}
^{^} Shipments figures based on certification alone.

=== Hit Machine 26 ===
Hit Machine 26

Compilation album by Various artists
- Released: 1999
- Genre: Pop
- Label: Mushroom

Professional ratings
Review scores
Source	Rating
Allmusic	4/5 stars

1. Lou Bega – "Mambo No. 5" (3:40)
2. Tom Jones and The Cardigans – "Burning Down the House" (3:38)
3. Tina Cousins – "Forever" (4:01)
4. Britney Spears – "Sometimes" (3:56)
5. Westlife – "If I Let You Go" (3:40)
6. Human Nature – "Eternal Flame" (3:21)
7. Tal Bachman – "She's So High" (3:46)
8. Moloko – "Sing It Back" (4:40)
9. Garbage – "When I Grow Up" (3:25)
10. Steps – "Love's Got a Hold on My Heart" (3:21)
11. Martina McBride – "I Love You" (2:53)
12. Bachelor Girl – "Lucky Me" (4:31)
13. Sixpence None the Richer – "There She Goes" (2:42)
14. B*Witched – "Jesse Hold On" (3:21)
15. Friendly – "Some Kind of Love Song" (3:08)
16. Real Blondes – "We B Cool" (3:24)
17. Amber – "Sexual (Li Da Di)" (4:37)
18. Beat-Boy – "Roof Is on Fire" (3:38)
19. R. Kelly – "If I Could Turn Back the Hands of Time" (4:59)
20. Michael Hutchence – "A Straight Line" (3:37)

==== Certifications ====
Region	Certification	Certified units/sales
Australia (ARIA)	2× Platinum	140,000^{^}
^{^} Shipments figures based on certification alone.

=== Hit Machine 27 ===
Hit Machine 27

Compilation album by Various artists
- Released: 2000
- Genre: Pop
- Label: Columbia

1. Macy Gray – "I Try" (3:58)
2. Len – "Steal My Sunshine" (4:02)
3. Jennifer Lopez – "Waiting for Tonight" (4:06)
4. Tina Cousins – "Pray" (3:56)
5. Vanessa Amorosi – "Absolutely Everybody" (3:44)
6. Alice Deejay – "Better Off Alone" (3:36)
7. Backstreet Boys – "Larger than Life" (3:53)
8. Five – "Keep On Movin'" (3:18)
9. Moby – "Why Does My Heart Feel So Bad?" (3:44)
10. Christina Aguilera – "Genie in a Bottle" (3:38)
11. TLC – "Unpretty" (4:39)
12. Blessid Union of Souls – "Hey Leonardo (She Likes Me for Me)" (3:26)
13. Britney Spears – "(You Drive Me) Crazy" (The Stop! Remix) (3:17)
14. Steps – "Say You'll Be Mine" (3:33)
15. Deni Hines – "Pull Up to the Bumper" (3:32)
16. Tom Jones and Mousse T. – "Sex Bomb" (3:32)
17. Ricky Martin – "Shake Your Bon-Bon" (3:11)
18. Lou Bega – "I Got a Girl" (3:04)
19. Westlife – "Flying Without Wings" (3:36)
20. deadstar – "Deeper Water" (4:11)

==== Certifications ====
Region	Certification	Certified units/sales
Australia (ARIA)	Platinum	70,000^{^}
^{^} Shipments figures based on certification alone.

=== Hit Machine 28 ===
Hit Machine 28

Compilation album by Various artists
- Released: 2000
- Genre: Pop
- Label: BMG

1. Destiny's Child – "Say My Name" (4:33)
2. Mandy Moore – "Candy" (3:55)
3. Pink – "There You Go" (3:25)
4. Toni Braxton – "He Wasn't Man Enough" (4:00)
5. Christina Aguilera – "What a Girl Wants" (3:52)
6. Chicane featuring Bryan Adams – "Don't Give Up" (3:41)
7. Naughty by Nature – "Holiday" (4:07)
8. TLC – "Dear Lie" (3:56)
9. Christine Anu – "Sunshine on a Rainy Day" (3:49)
10. Jessica Simpson – "I Wanna Love You Forever" (4:23)
11. Coco Lee – "Do You Want My Love" (3:51)
12. Five – "Don't Wanna Let You Go" (3:37)
13. Lonestar – "Amazed" (4:27)
14. Marc Anthony – "I Need to Know" (3:48)
15. Moloko – "The Time Is Now" (4:28)
16. Oblivia – "My Friend" (4:10)
17. Human Nature – "Be There With You" (3:51)
18. Jimmy Christo – "Somebody Like You" (3:55)
19. Linguini Brothers – "Tarantella 2000" (2:46)
20. Ricky Martin – "Private Emotion" (4:02)

==== Certifications ====
Region	Certification	Certified units/sales
Australia (ARIA)	Platinum	70,000^{^}
^{^} Shipments figures based on certification alone.
