= Now That's What I Call Music! (disambiguation) =

Now That's What I Call Music! is the name given to several different series of various-artists compilation albums.

Now That's What I Call Music! may also refer to four debut albums:

- Now That's What I Call Music (original UK album), the very first "Now!" album, released on 10 December 1983 in the UK
- Now That's What I Call Music! (original U.S. album), the first album in the U.S. "Now!" series, released on 27 October 1998
- Now That's What I Call Music! (Asia), the first album in the Asia "Now!" series, released on 20 July 1995
- Now 01 Australian series 2002 release

== See also ==
- Now That's What I Call Music! discography
