= Now That's What I Call Music! 36 =

Now That's What I Call Music! 36 or Now 36 may refer to several "Now That's What I Call Music!" series albums, including

- Now That's What I Call Music! 36 (UK series)
- Now That's What I Call Music! 36 (South African series)
- Now That's What I Call Music! 36 (U.S. series)
