= Now That's What I Call Music! 35 =

Now That's What I Call Music! 35 or Now 35 may refer to both Now That's What I Call Music! series albums, including

- Now That's What I Call Music! 35 (UK series)
- Now That's What I Call Music! 35 (U.S. series)
