= Now That's What I Call Music! 41 =

Now That's What I Call Music! 41 or Now 41 may refer to two Now That's What I Call Music! series albums, including

- Now That's What I Call Music! 41 (UK series)
- Now That's What I Call Music! 41 (U.S. series)
