= Now That's What I Call the 1990s =

Compilation album by Various artists
- Released: November 9, 2010
- Recorded: 1992–1999
- Genre: Alternative
- Length: 73:29
- Label: EMI

Series chronology
Now That's What I Call Music! 36 (2010)	Now That's What I Call the 1990s (2010)	Now That's What I Call Music! 37 (2011)

Now That's What I Call the 1990s is a special edition compilation album from the (U.S.) Now! series released on November 9, 2010. It entered the Billboard 200 albums chart at No. 173 in the issue dated November 27, 2010.

== Track listing ==
No.	Title	Artist	Length
1.	"You Get What You Give"	New Radicals (1998)	4:40
2.	"Two Princes"	Spin Doctors (1993)	4:15
3.	"One Week"	Barenaked Ladies (1998)	2:49
4.	"Bitch"	Meredith Brooks (1997)	4:13
5.	"If It Makes You Happy"	Sheryl Crow (1996)	4:31
6.	"One of Us"	Joan Osborne (1995)	4:16
7.	"Stay (I Missed You)"	Lisa Loeb (1994)	3:05
8.	"You Gotta Be"	Des'ree (1994)	4:06
9.	"Ordinary World"	Duran Duran (1993)	4:40
10.	"Lullaby"	Shawn Mullins (1998)	4:33
11.	"I'll Be"	Edwin McCain (1998)	4:27
12.	"If You Could Only See"	Tonic (1997)	4:23
13.	"Everything You Want"	Vertical Horizon (1999)	4:16
14.	"Father of Mine"	Everclear (1998)	3:53
15.	"I Alone"	Live (1994)	3:51
16.	"Shine"	Collective Soul (1993/1997)	5:07
17.	"No Rain"	Blind Melon (1992)	3:36
18.	"What I Got"	Sublime (1996)	2:53

== Reception ==
Professional ratings
Review scores
Source	Rating
Allmusic	2.5/5 stars

According to Andrew Leahey of Allmusic, Now That's What I Call the 1990s is a "narrow-minded compilation" with a mix of pop songs and alternative music which focuses on the second half of the decade and ignores "grunge, Euro-dance, and teen pop".
