= Now That's What I Call Music! 34 =

Now That's What I Call Music! 34 or Now 34 may refer to at least two Now That's What I Call Music! series albums, including

- Now That's What I Call Music! 34 (UK series)
- Now That's What I Call Music! 34 (South African series)
- Now That's What I Call Music! 34 (U.S. series)
