= Now That's What I Call Music! 40 (American series) =

Compilation album by various artists
- Released: November 8, 2011
- Length: 73:27
- Label: EMI

Numbered series chronology
Now That's What I Call Music! 39 (2011)	Now That's What I Call Music! 40 (2011)	Now That's What I Call Music! 41 (2012)

Now That's What I Call Music! 40 was released on November 8, 2011. The album is the 40th edition of the Now! series in the United States. To celebrate the release of its 40th disc, two versions were released: the standard edition containing "16 of the hottest tracks from the last few months", including the Billboard Hot 100 number-one hit, "Moves like Jagger" by Maroon 5, and a two-disc Deluxe Edition set that "includes all the hits in the standard set, as well as the greatest hits from the last several years featured on previous sets." Also included on the second disc are two songs not featured on prior Now installments - but still reached the top 5 of the Billboard Hot 100 - "Low" by Flo Rida and "Cry Me a River" by Justin Timberlake.

Now! 40 debuted at number three on the Billboard 200 albums chart. The album has sold 703,000 copies as of May 2012.

== Track listing ==
No.	Title	Artist	Length
1.	"Moves like Jagger"	Maroon 5 featuring. Christina Aguilera	3:20
2.	"I Wanna Go"	Britney Spears	3:28
3.	"Without You"	David Guetta featuring Usher	3:26
4.	"You Make Me Feel..."	Cobra Starship featuring Sabi	3:31
5.	"Mr. Saxobeat"	Alexandra Stan	3:12
6.	"In the Dark"	Dev	3:45
7.	"Pumped Up Kicks"	Foster the People	3:55
8.	"Cheers (Drink to That)"	Rihanna	3:58
9.	"Lighters"	Bad Meets Evil featuring Bruno Mars	5:02
10.	"It Girl"	Jason Derulo	3:07
11.	"Yoü and I"	Lady Gaga	4:05
12.	"Mr. Know It All"	Kelly Clarkson	3:49
13.	"When We Stand Together"	Nickelback	3:07
14.	"Nothing"	The Script	4:28
15.	"Just a Kiss"	Lady Antebellum	3:34
16.	"Skyscraper"	Demi Lovato	3:51
17.	"Brand New Day"	Trevor Hall	3:30
18.	"Poisoned with Love"	Neon Hitch	3:43
19.	"Birthday Dress"	Lil Playy featuring Matthew Koma	3:23
20.	"Children"	V V Brown featuring Chiddy Bang	3:13

=== Deluxe Edition (Disc 2) ===
No.	Title	Artist	Length
1.	"So What" (from Now! 29)	Pink	3:33
2.	"...Baby One More Time" (from Now! 2)	Britney Spears	3:29
3.	"Forever" (from Now! 29)	Chris Brown	4:35
4.	"Dynamite" (from Now! 36)	Taio Cruz	3:36
5.	"Low"	Flo Rida featuring T-Pain	3:48
6.	"Lollipop" (from Now! 28)	Lil Wayne featuring Static Major	4:07
7.	"Just Dance" (from Now! 30)	Lady Gaga featuring Colby O'Donis	4:00
8.	"I Gotta Feeling" (from Now! 32)	The Black Eyed Peas	4:03
9.	"I Kissed a Girl" (from The Best of Now That's What I Call Music! 10th Anniversary)	Katy Perry	2:58
10.	"Tik Tok" (from Now! 33)	Kesha	3:19
11.	"Cry Me a River"	Justin Timberlake	4:47
12.	"Apologize" (from Now! 27)	Timbaland featuring OneRepublic	3:04
13.	"She Will Be Loved" (from Now That's What I Call Love)	Maroon 5	4:15
14.	"Rockstar" (from Now! 26)	Nickelback	4:12
15.	"Hey, Soul Sister" (from Now! 33)	Train	3:34
16.	"Love Story" (from Now! 30)	Taylor Swift	3:55

== Reception ==
Professional ratings
Review scores
Source	Rating
Allmusic	2.5/5 stars

Allmusic critic Andy Kellman states that when Now! 40 was released in November 2011, half of the 16 "proper" tracks were in the top 20 of the Billboard Hot 100, but the inclusion of Nickelback's "When We Stand Together" must have been for "stylistic variety" as the "lone representative for macho rock" on the album. Otherwise, "the disc is stocked with major dance-pop singles."

== Charts ==
=== Weekly charts ===
Chart (2011)	Peak position
US Billboard 200	3

=== Year-end charts ===
Chart (2012)	Position
US Billboard 200	36
