= Now That's What I Call Music! 37 =

Now That's What I Call Music! 37 or Now 37 may refer to three "Now That's What I Call Music!" series albums, including

- Now That's What I Call Music! 37 (UK series)
- Now That's What I Call Music! 37 (South African series)
- Now That's What I Call Music! 37 (U.S. series)
