= 100% Hits =

Australian compilation album series

100% Hits is an Australian compilation album series of popular Top 40 songs by artists signed under the Warner Music Australasia label. The current release 100% Hits: The Best of 2017 reached Number 4 on the ARIA Australian Top 20 Compilation Albums Chart.

The series started in 1991 as a collaboration between the EMI Music Australia, Warner Music Australasia and Polystar labels. with a new album released approximately every 3 months. Starting in 1992 a "Best-of" compilations was released at the end of each year. In 2001, a change was made to the same "season-named" branding as the rival So Fresh series. This continued until 2002, when after 36 albums, the series was replaced with the NOW series, named after the international Now That's What I Call Music! series. However, "Best-of" compilations continued to be released at the end of each year.

In 2013, the 100% Hits series returned, however since 2016 the releases have become more infrequent.

From 2018, 100% Hits has record label rights with Warner Music, EMI, Shock Records & Mushroom Group.

== Discography ==
=== 100% Hits series ===
- 100% Hits Volume 1 (EMI, 1991)
- 100% Hits Volume 2 (Warner Special Products, 1991)
- 100% Hits Volume 3 (EMI, 1992)
- 100% Hits Volume 4 (Warner Special Products, 1992)
- 100% Hits Volume 5 (EMI, 1992)
- 100% Hits Volume 6 (EMI, 1992)
- 100% Hits Volume 7 (Warner Special Products, 1993)
- 100% Hits Volume 8 (Polystar, 1993)
- 100% Hits Volume 9
- 100% Hits Volume 10
- 100% Hits Volume 11
- 100% Hits Volume 12
- 100% Hits Volume 13
- 100% Hits Volume 14
- 100% Hits Volume 15
- 100% Hits Volume 16
- 100% Hits Volume 17
- 100% Hits Volume 18
- 100% Hits Volume 19
- 100% Hits Volume 20
- 100% Hits Volume 21
- 100% Hits '97: The Music
- 100% Hits Volume 23
- 100% Hits Volume 24
- 100% Hits Volume 25
- 100% Hits Volume 26
- 100% Hits Volume 27
- 100% Hits Volume 28
- 100% Hits Volume 29
- 100% Hits Volume 30
- 100% Hits Volume 31
- 100% Hits Volume 32
- 100% Hits Volume 33
- 100% Hits: Winter 2001
- 100% Hits: Spring 2001
- 100% Hits: Autumn 2002
- 100% Hits 2013, Vol. 1
- 100% Hits 2014, Vol. 1
- 100% Hits 2014, Vol. 2
- 100% Hits 2015, Vol. 1
- 100% Hits 2015, Vol. 2
- 100% Hits 2016, Vol. 1

=== Best of compilations ===
- The Best of 1992... 100% Hits
- The Best of 100% Hits: 1993
- The Best of 100% Hits: 1994
- 100% Hits: The Best of 1995
- 100% Hits: The Best of 1996
- 100% Hits: The Best of 1997
- 100% Hits: The Best of 1998
- 100% Hits: The Best of 1999 (EMI, 1999)
  - Certified 2× platinum in Australia.
- 100% Hits: The Best of 2000 (EMI, 2000)
- 100% Hits: The Best of 2001 + Summer Hits (EMI, 2001)
- 100% Hits: Very Best of 2002 (EMI, 2002)
- 100% Hits: Best of 2003 (EMI, 2003)
- 100% Hits: The Best of 2004 (EMI, 2004)
- 100% Hits: The Best of 2005 (EMI, 2005)
- 100% Hits: The Best of 2006 (EMI/Warner Music Australia, 2006)
- 100% Hits: The Best of 2007 (EMI/Warner Music Australia, 2007)
- 100% Hits: The Best of 2008
- 100% Hits: The Best of 2009
- 100% Hits of the Decade: 2000–2010
- 100% Hits: The Best of 2010 – Winter Edition
- 100% Hits: The Best of 2010 – Summer Edition
- 100% Hits: The Best of 2011 – Winter Edition
- 100% Hits: The Best of 2011 – Summer Edition
- 100% Hits: The Best of 2012 – Winter Edition
- 100% Hits: The Best of 2012 – Summer Edition
- 100% Hits: The Best of 2013
- 100% Hits: The Best of 2014
- 100% Hits: The Best of 2015
- 100% Hits: The Best of 2016
- 100% Hits The Best of 2017 So Far
- 100% Hits The Best of 2017
- 100% Hits The Best Of 2018
- 100% Hits The Best Of 2018 So Far

== See also ==
- Now That's What I Call Music!
- Now 01
- Hit Machine
- So Fresh
