= Now That's What I Call Music! 52 =

Now That's What I Call Music! 52 or Now 52 may refer to both Now That's What I Call Music! series albums, including:

- Now That's What I Call Music! 52 (UK series)
- Now That's What I Call Music! 52 (U.S. series)
