= Holy Roadside =

Studio album by The Badloves
- Released: 13 October 1995
- Recorded: 1994–95
- Studio: Sing Sing Studios, Metropolis Audio
- Label: Mushroom Records
- Producer: Doug Roberts; The Badloves

The Badloves chronology
Get on Board (1993)	Holy Roadside (1995)	Everybody Everywhere (1997)

Singles from Holy Roadside
- 1. "Caroline" Released: September 1995; 2. "Slave" Released: December 1995; 3. "Living Things" Released: February 1996; 4. "Barefoot Bride" Released: May 1996

Holy Roadside is the second studio album by Australian rock and pop band The Badloves. The album was released in October 1995, peaked at number 14 and was certified gold.

At the ARIA Music Awards of 1996, the album earned The Badloves a nomination for ARIA Award for Best Group and Doug Roberts for Producer of the Year.

== Track listing ==
No.	Title	Writer(s)	Length
1.	"In My Garden"	Michael Spiby	3:57
2.	"Slave"	Spiby	5:22
3.	"Living Things"	Spiby	3:50
4.	"Barefoot Bride"	Spiby	4:11
5.	"Caroline"	Spiby; David Byrne	3:04
6.	"Precious"	Spiby	3:24
7.	"I Wanna Hide"	John Favaro; John Housden	4:36
8.	"Skin I'm In"	Spiby	4:04
9.	"Powerful Karma"	Tony Featherstone	3:46
10.	"Holy Roadside"	Spiby	6:49

== Charts ==
Chart (1995)	Peak position
Australian Albums (ARIA)	14

== Certification ==
Region	Certification	Certified units/sales
Australia (ARIA)	Gold	35,000^{^}
^{^} Shipments figures based on certification alone.

== Release history ==
Country	Date	Format	Label	Catalogue
Australia	October 1995	CD, Cassette, LP	Mushroom Records	MUSH32369.2
