= Now That's What I Call Music! 51 =

Now That's What I Call Music! 51 or Now 51 may refer to the following Now That's What I Call Music! series albums:

- Now That's What I Call Music! 51 (UK series)
- Now That's What I Call Music! 51 (U.S. series)
