= Now That's What I Call Dance Classics =

Compilation album by Various artists
- Released: November 3, 2009
- Genre: Dance, pop, hip hop, R&B
- Length: 79:56
- Label: Sony Legacy

Series chronology
Now That's What I Call Music! 32 (2009)	Now That's What I Call Dance Classics (2009)	Now That's What I Call Love (2010)

Professional ratings
Review scores
Source	Rating
Allmusic	link

Now That's What I Call Dance Classics is a compilation album in the U.S. Now! series released on November 3, 2009, consisting of popular dance tracks released between 1978 and 1996. It peaked at number three on the Billboard Dance/Electronic Albums chart.

== Track listing ==
No.	Title	Artist	Length
1.	"Gonna Make You Sweat (Everybody Dance Now)"	C+C Music Factory	4:03
2.	"C'mon Ride It (The Train)"	Quad City DJ's	4:01
3.	"It Takes Two"	Rob Base & DJ E-Z Rock	3:31
4.	"Bust a Move"	Young MC	4:23
5.	"U Can't Touch This"	MC Hammer	4:12
6.	"Push It"	Salt-n-Pepa	4:15
7.	"Rump Shaker"	Wreckx-n-Effect	3:55
8.	"Humpin' Around"	Bobby Brown	4:20
9.	"Real Love"	Jody Watley	4:17
10.	"You Dropped a Bomb on Me"	Gap Band	4:01
11.	"Word Up!"	Cameo	4:18
12.	"Shake Your Body (Down to the Ground)"	The Jacksons	3:42
13.	"Boogie Wonderland"	Earth, Wind & Fire (with the Emotions)	4:45
14.	"It's Raining Men"	The Weather Girls	3:31
15.	"Straight Up"	Paula Abdul	4:07
16.	"Finally"	CeCe Peniston	3:57
17.	"Pump Up the Jam"	Technotronic	3:33
18.	"What Is Love"	Haddaway	4:25
19.	"Beautiful Life"	Ace of Base	3:36
20.	"I'm Too Sexy"	Right Said Fred	2:49

== Charts ==
=== Weekly charts ===
Chart (2009)	Peak position
US Billboard 200	108
US Top Dance/Electronic Albums (Billboard)	3
US Top R&B/Hip-Hop Albums (Billboard)	61

=== Year-end charts ===
Chart (2010)	Position
US Top Dance/Electronic Albums (Billboard)	18
