= Get on Board =

Studio album by The Badloves
- Released: 26 July 1993
- Recorded: 1992–93
- Studio: Metropolis Audio
- Label: Mushroom
- Producer: Doug Roberts; The Badloves

The Badloves chronology
Get on Board (1993)	Holy Roadside (1995)

Singles from Get on Board
- 1. "Lost" Released: 8 March 1993; 2. "I Remember" Released: July 1993; 3. "Green Limousine" Released: 29 November 1993; 4. "Memphis" Released: 14 March 1994

Get on Board is the debut studio album by Australian band The Badloves. released in July 1993. The album peaked at number 3 on the ARIA Albums chart and was certified double platinum by ARIA. It was re-released in 1994 with a bonus 8-track disc.

At the ARIA Music Awards of 1994, Get on Board was nominated for the Album of the Year and won Best New Talent and Breakthrough Artist – Album. Furthermore, at the ARIA Music Awards of 1995, it was nominated for Highest Selling Album.

== Background ==
Australian rock and pop group, the Badloves' debut album Get on Board appeared in July 1993 via Mushroom Records, which the band co-produced with Doug Roberts. They had been formed in 1990 by John "Jak" Housden on lead guitar, Stephen "Irish" O'Prey on bass guitar, John Spiby on keyboards and saxophone, his brother Michael Spiby on lead vocals and guitar and Chris Tabone on drums. The album was preceded by the singles, "Lost" (March 1993) and "I Remember" (July) and was followed by "Green Limousine" (November) and "Memphis" (March 1994). The album peaked at number 3 on the ARIA Albums chart and was certified double platinum by ARIA.

At the ARIA Music Awards of 1994, Get on Board was nominated for the Album of the Year and won Best New Talent and Breakthrough Artist – Album. Furthermore, at the ARIA Music Awards of 1995, it was nominated for Highest Selling Album.

== Track listing ==
Get on Board
No.	Title	Writer(s)	Length
1.	"Memphis"	Michael Spiby	5:09
2.	"Green Limousine"	M. Spiby	3:45
3.	"Tell Me"	John Housden; Stephen O'Prey	3:21
4.	"I Remember"	Housden; O'Prey	3:12
5.	"High on a Mountain"	M. Spiby	4:06
6.	"What's on Your Mind"	M. Spiby	4:29
7.	"Lost"	M. Spiby	3:33
8.	"Sugar Daddy"	M. Spiby	6:17
9.	"Yesterday's Gone"	M. Spiby	5:04
10.	"Spirit in the Sky"	M. Spiby	3:36

Out Takes and B Sides
No.	Title	Writer(s)	Length
1.	"Long Hard Day"		3:57
2.	"Stop"		4:21
3.	"Forgiven"		3:13
4.	"Nowhere to Hide"		4:21
5.	"Spirit in the Sky" (demo)	Spiby	2:54
6.	"I Embarrass Myself"		4:28
7.	"Live"		4:56
8.	"I Bled"		4:01

== Personnel ==
Credits:

The Badloves

- John "Jak" Housden – lead guitar, backing vocals
- Stephen "Irish" O'Prey _ bass guitar, backing vocals
- John Spiby – keyboards, saxophone, tenor saxophone (tracks 6, 7)
- Michael Spiby – lead vocals, lead guitar
- Chris Tabone – drums

Additional musicians

- Susie Ahern – backing vocals (tracks 1, 4, 6), vocals (track 2)
- Jen Anderson – violin, viola
- Henric Beiers – cello (tracks 1, 4, 7)
- Tony Featherstone – piano, organ (1,4,7)
- Rob Tronca – electric piano (tracks 2, 3, 4)
- Kintsho Tshabalala – bell tree (tracks 2, 9), shaker (track 2)
- Paul Williamson – baritone saxophone (track 7)
- Chris Wilson – harmonica (tracks 8,9), vocals (track 8)
- David Wilson – backing vocals (tracks 1, 4, 6)

Artisans

- Doug Roberts – producer, recording engineer, mixer
- Kate Hopkins B&W photography
- Debbie Lord – design
- Letitia O'Prey B&W photography
- Greg O'Shea – assistant recording engineer, assistant mixer
- Ilana Rose – photography
- Leon Zervos – mastering engineer

== Charts ==
=== Weekly charts ===
Chart (1993/94)	Peak position
Australian Albums (ARIA)	3

=== Year-end charts ===
Chart (1994)	Position
Australian Albums (ARIA)	16

== Certification ==
Region	Certification	Certified units/sales
Australia (ARIA)	2× Platinum	140,000^{^}
^{^} Shipments figures based on certification alone.

== Release history ==
Country	Date	Format	Label	Catalogue
Australia	August 1993	CD	Mushroom Records	D30976, D24025
Australia	1994	2x CD	Mushroom Records	TVD93402, RMD53402
Australia	2 April 2021	LP	Inertia	5419709553
