= Now That's What I Call Music! 35 (American series) =

Compilation album by various artists
- Released: August 31, 2010
- Length: 71:46
- Label: EMI

Series chronology
Now That's What I Call Music! 34 (2010)	Now That's What I Call Music! 35 (2010)	Now That's What I Call Music! 36 (2010)

Now That's What I Call Music! 35 was released on August 31, 2010. The album is the 35th edition of the (U.S.) Now! series. It features the number-one Billboard Hot 100 hit, "California Gurls".

Now 35 debuted at number two on the Billboard 200, moving 105,000 units in its first week of release. In November 2010, the album was certified Gold by the RIAA.

== Track listing ==
No.	Title	Artist	Length
1.	"California Gurls"	Katy Perry featuring Snoop Dogg	3:52
2.	"Somebody to Love" (Remix)	Justin Bieber featuring Usher	3:36
3.	"Gettin' Over You"	David Guetta & Chris Willis featuring Fergie & LMFAO	3:04
4.	"Rock That Body"	The Black Eyed Peas	3:58
5.	"Bulletproof"	La Roux	3:25
6.	"Alejandro"	Lady Gaga	4:31
7.	"Cooler Than Me"	Mike Posner	3:32
8.	"Billionaire"	Travie McCoy featuring Bruno Mars	3:29
9.	"Ridin' Solo"	Jason Derulo	3:23
10.	"Impossible"	Shontelle	3:43
11.	"Pray for You"	Jaron and the Long Road to Love	3:05
12.	"This Afternoon"	Nickelback	4:12
13.	"Kissin U"	Miranda Cosgrove	3:16
14.	"My First Kiss"	3OH!3 featuring Kesha	3:12
15.	"Undo It"	Carrie Underwood	2:56
16.	"Lover, Lover"	Jerrod Niemann	3:23
17.	"Stronger"	Jennette McCurdy	3:24
18.	"Speakers"	Days Difference	4:15
19.	"Obsession"	Sky Ferreira	3:41
20.	"Shut the Front Door (Got My Girls)"	Tiffany Dunn	3:47

== Reception ==
Professional ratings
Review scores
Source	Rating
AllMusic	2/5 stars

Andy Kellman of AllMusic calls Now! 35 "one of the more 'now' volumes of the series" with only one of its 16 hits not in the Hot 100 at the time of its release. However, the rock selections on the album "seem like arbitrary throw-ins".

== Charts ==
=== Weekly charts ===
Chart (2010)	Peak position
US Billboard 200	2

=== Year-end charts ===
Chart (2010)	Position
US Billboard 200	77
Chart (2011)	Position
US Billboard 200	194
