= Lost (The Badloves song) =

Single by The Badloves

from the album Get On Board
- Released: March 8, 1993
- Recorded: 1992
- Studio: Metropolis Audio
- Length: 3:31
- Label: Mushroom Records
- Songwriter(s): Michael Spiby
- Producer(s): The Badloves; Doug Roberts

The Badloves singles chronology
"Lost" (1993)	"I Remember" (1993)

"Lost" is a song by Australian rock and pop band The Badloves. "Lost" was released in March 1993 as the band's debut single and lead single from the band's debut studio album Get On Board. The song peaked at number 51 in Australia.

On the album liner notes, Michael Spiby says "It's about being lost emotionally. It's about realising that everyone around can be as lost as you are. It's about not having a home ground, not having a base."

At the ARIA Music Awards of 1994, the song was nominated for two awards, winning the ARIA Award for Breakthrough Artist - Single.

== Track listing ==
CD single (D16063)

1. "Lost" - 3:31
2. "Stop" - 3:21

== Charts ==
Chart (1993)	Peak position
Australia (ARIA)	51
