= Now That's What I Call Music! 34 (American series) =

Compilation album by various artists
- Released: June 15, 2010
- Length: 72:38
- Label: EMI

Series chronology
Now That's What I Call Music! 33 (2010)	Now That's What I Call Music! 34 (2010)	Now That's What I Call Music! 35 (2010)

Now That's What I Call Music! 34 was released on June 15, 2010. The album is the 34th edition of the (U.S.) Now! series. Four tracks, "Nothin' on You", "Rude Boy", "OMG" and "Imma Be", reached number one on the Billboard Hot 100. The final four tracks are "What's Next New Music Preview" bonus tracks.

Now! 34 debuted at number four on the Billboard 200 albums chart with sales of 88,000 copies sold. This marks the first Now album to sell less than 100,000 copies in its first week since the first volume of the Now series in 1998. In November 2010, the album was certified Gold by the RIAA.

This album was dedicated to Bob Mercer, the man credited with bringing the Now! series to the United States, as Mercer had recently died at 65 from lung cancer on May 5, 2010. Written on the pamphlet is "Bob's passion for music shines through every record, and he is greatly missed." In memoriam, "Hello Sunshine" was written somewhere on the back artwork of nearly every release since this one.

== Track listing ==
No.	Title	Artist	Length
1.	"Baby"	Justin Bieber featuring Ludacris	3:33
2.	"Nothin' on You"	B.o.B featuring Bruno Mars	3:37
3.	"Your Love Is My Drug"	Kesha	3:05
4.	"Rude Boy"	Rihanna	3:42
5.	"My Chick Bad"	Ludacris featuring Nicki Minaj	3:36
6.	"Winner"	Jamie Foxx featuring Justin Timberlake and T.I.	4:03
7.	"OMG"	Usher featuring will.i.am	4:27
8.	"Imma Be"	The Black Eyed Peas	3:52
9.	"Solo"	Iyaz	3:20
10.	"All the Right Moves"	OneRepublic	3:56
11.	"Halfway Gone"	Lifehouse	3:13
12.	"Sweet Disposition"	The Temper Trap	3:50
13.	"Heart Heart Heartbreak"	Boys Like Girls	3:23
14.	"Breakeven"	The Script	4:15
15.	"American Honey"	Lady Antebellum	3:41
16.	"The House That Built Me"	Miranda Lambert	4:06
17.	"Little Lies"	Dave Barnes	2:45
18.	"Worry About You"	2AM Club	3:11
19.	"So Obvious"	Runner Runner	3:46
20.	"Almost Love (24/7)"	Jessica Jarrell	3:19

== Reception ==
Professional ratings
Review scores
Source	Rating
Allmusic	2/5 stars

Andy Kellman of Allmusic calls the addition of the so-called bonus tracks alarming. With 16 hits and near hits and four "bonus tracks", this Now That's What I Call Music collection "is 20 percent Tomorrow That's What I Might Call Music."

== Charts ==
=== Weekly charts ===
Chart (2010)	Peak position
US Billboard 200	4

=== Year-end charts ===
Chart (2010)	Position
US Billboard 200	63
