= Memphis (The Badloves song) =

Single by The Badloves

from the album Get On Board
- Released: April 1994
- Recorded: 1993
- Studio: Metropolis Audio
- Length: 4:45
- Label: Mushroom Records
- Songwriter(s): Michael Spiby
- Producer(s): The Badloves

The Badloves singles chronology
"Green Limousine" (1993)	"Memphis" (1994)	"Caroline" (1995)

"Memphis" is a song by Australian rock and pop band The Badloves and released in April 1994 as the fourth and final single from the band's debut studio album Get On Board. The song peaked at number 73 on the Australian ARIA Charts.

On the album liner notes, Michael Spiby says "India has Buddha, America has Elvis. Inspired by the movie Mystery Train (film), the song is about Americans' seemingly inexplicable obsession with the dead man from Graceland".

== Track listing ==
CD single (D11474)

1. "Memphis" - 4:45
2. "Forgiven" - 3:15
3. "Spirit in the Sky" (demo) - 2:55

== Charts ==
Chart (1994)	Peak position
Australia (ARIA)	73
