= Now That's What I Call Music! 41 (American series) =

Compilation album by various artists
- Released: February 7, 2012
- Genre: Pop
- Length: 73:47
- Label: EMI

Series chronology
Now That's What I Call Music! 40 (2011)	Now That's What I Call Music! 41 (2012)	Now That's What I Call Music! 42 (2012)

Now That's What I Call Music! 41 was released on February 7, 2012. It is the 41st edition of the Now! series in the United States. The album debuted at number three on the Billboard 200 for the week ending February 24, 2012, after selling 142,000 units in its first week of release. A month later, it returned to number three on the chart and jumped to number one on the Billboard Digital Albums chart after a one-day, 25-cent promotion of its downloadable version by Google Play and Amazon.com pushed digital sales up 1,367%.

== Track listing ==
No.	Title	Artist	Length
1.	"Sexy and I Know It"	LMFAO	3:17
2.	"The One That Got Away"	Katy Perry	3:46
3.	"Marry the Night"	Lady Gaga	4:01
4.	"Domino"	Jessie J	3:48
5.	"Stereo Hearts"	Gym Class Heroes featuring Adam Levine	3:30
6.	"5 O'Clock"	T-Pain featuring Lily Allen	3:30
7.	"Work Out"	J. Cole	3:52
8.	"International Love"	Pitbull featuring Chris Brown	3:45
9.	"Blackout"	Breathe Carolina	3:28
10.	"Love You like a Love Song"	Selena Gomez & the Scene	3:05
11.	"Not Over You"	Gavin DeGraw	3:34
12.	"Paradise"	Coldplay	4:36
13.	"Someone like You"	Adele	4:41
14.	"Lullaby"	Nickelback	3:45
15.	"I Don't Want This Night to End"	Luke Bryan	3:37
16.	"Red Solo Cup"	Toby Keith	3:54
17.	"Blow Up"	Sammy Adams	2:56
18.	"Somebody's Heartbreak"	Hunter Hayes	3:46
19.	"Eat Dirt"	Susan Justice	3:39
20.	"Glad You Came"	The Wanted	3:17

== Reception ==
Professional ratings
Review scores
Source	Rating
Allmusic	3/5 stars

Allmusic critic Andy Kellman summarizes the chart performance of the songs in Now That's What I Call Music! 41 by noting that three of the songs, "Sexy and I Know It", "The One That Got Away", and "Domino", were in the top ten of the Billboard Hot 100 at the time of the album's release in February 2012, and calling Lady Gaga's "Marry the Night" and Nickelback's "Lullaby" "duds in comparison". The inclusion of two country songs bring this edition a "more country flavor", at least compared to Now! 40, and "the compilation's highlights" are Coldplay's "Paradise" and J. Cole's "Work Out".

== Charts ==
=== Weekly charts ===
Chart (2012)	Peak position
US Billboard 200	3
US Digital Albums (Billboard)	1

=== Year-end charts ===
Chart (2012)	Position
US Billboard 200	22

=== Decade-end charts ===
Chart (2010–2019)	Position
US Billboard 200	197
