= Now That's What I Call Love (U.S. album) =

Compilation album by Various artists
- Released: January 26, 2010
- Recorded: 1999–2009
- Genre: Pop
- Length: 77:31
- Label: Virgin / EMI / Studiopolis

Series chronology
Now That's What I Call Dance Classics (2009)	Now That's What I Call Love (2010)	Now That's What I Call Music! 33 (2010)

Now That's What I Call Love is a compilation album in the U.S. Now! series, released on January 26, 2010, consisting of 20 romantic ballads released between 1999 through 2009.

== Track listing ==
No.	Title	Artist	Length
1.	"Bubbly"	Colbie Caillat	3:15
2.	"She Will Be Loved"	Maroon 5	4:14
3.	"Whatever It Takes"	Lifehouse	3:24
4.	"Here Without You"	3 Doors Down	3:54
5.	"Far Away"	Nickelback	3:55
6.	"Home"	Daughtry	4:11
7.	"Light On"	David Cook	3:47
8.	"Lips of an Angel"	Hinder	4:18
9.	"The Reason"	Hoobastank	3:50
10.	"Collide"	Howie Day	4:06
11.	"Thinking of You"	Katy Perry	3:56
12.	"No One"	Alicia Keys	4:13
13.	"Love Like This"	Natasha Bedingfield feat. Sean Kingston	3:43
14.	"Bleeding Love"	Leona Lewis	3:58
15.	"Apologize"	Timbaland presents OneRepublic	3:03
16.	"No Air"	Jordin Sparks and Chris Brown	4:21
17.	"Come Away with Me"	Norah Jones	3:13
18.	"Amazed"	Lonestar	4:25
19.	"Love Story"	Taylor Swift	3:53
20.	"Kiss a Girl"	Keith Urban	3:45

== Chart position ==
Chart (2010)	Peak position
Billboard 200	32
Billboard Rock Albums	6
