= I Remember (The Badloves song) =

Single by The Badloves

from the album Get On Board
- Released: May 1993
- Recorded: 1993
- Studio: Metropolis Audio
- Length: 3:10
- Label: Mushroom Records
- Songwriter(s): Stephen Housden; Stephen O'Prey
- Producer(s): The Badloves; Doug Roberts

The Badloves singles chronology
| "Lost" (1993) | "I Remember" (1993) | "The Weight" (1993) |

"I Remember" is a song by Australian rock and pop band The Badloves and released in May 1993 as the second single from the band's debut studio album Get On Board. The song peaked at number 48 in Australia.

== Track listings ==
CD single (D12125)

1. "I Remember" - 3:10
2. "Live" (Live) - 5:00
3. "I Embarrass Myself" (Live) - 3:45

Ltd Edition CD Maxi (D12582)

1. "I Remember" - 3:10
2. "Lost" - 3:31
3. "Stop" - 3:21
4. "Live" (Live) - 5:00
5. "I Embarrass Myself" (Live) - 3:45

== Charts ==
| Chart (1993) | Peak position |
|---|---|
| Australia (ARIA) | 48 |
