= Now That's What I Call Music (original UK album) =

Compilation album by Various Artists
- Released: 28 November 1983
- Recorded: 1982, 1983
- Genre: Pop, Rock
- Length: 1:55:01
- Label: Virgin/EMI

Series chronology
| Now That's What I Call Music (1983) | Now That's What I Call Music II (1984) |

Now That's What I Call Music (also simply titled Now or Now 1) is the first album from the popular Now series that was released in the United Kingdom on 28 November 1983. Initial pressings were released on vinyl and audio cassette. To celebrate the 25th anniversary of the album and series, the album was re-released on CD for the first time in 2009. Alternative longer mixes of "Only for Love", "Double Dutch" and "Candy Girl" were included in place of the original shorter single mixes from 1983. A double vinyl re-release followed for Record Store Day on 18 April 2015. In July 2018, the album was newly remastered and re-released on CD, vinyl and cassette to commemorate the release of the 100th volume of the series.

In December 1983, the compilation debuted at number seven on the UK Albums Chart and reached number one a week later, staying at the top for five non-consecutive weeks.

== History ==
The idea for the first album in the series came from Virgin Records boss Richard Branson and his associate Simon Draper. They had decided to make their own compilation albums, in collaboration with EMI, in order to include the biggest hits of the day in one record. Branson had previously gifted Draper a copy of a vintage advertising poster featuring an illustration of a pig listening to a "singing" chicken, which had just laid an egg, bearing the caption "Now, That's what I call Music". Seeing the poster, the two decided to use the caption for their compilation album. Branson had bought the object from a bric-a-brac shop, where his future wife Joan Templeman was working.

== Track listing ==
Record/Tape 1
| No. | Title | Artist | Length |
|---|---|---|---|
| 1. | "You Can't Hurry Love" | Phil Collins | 2:52 |
| 2. | "Is There Something I Should Know?" | Duran Duran | 4:11 |
| 3. | "Red Red Wine" | UB40 | 3:01 |
| 4. | "Only for Love" | Limahl | 3:48 |
| 5. | "Temptation" | Heaven 17 | 3:07 |
| 6. | "Give It Up" | KC and the Sunshine Band | 4:12 |
| 7. | "Double Dutch" | Malcolm McLaren | 3:40 |
| 8. | "Total Eclipse of the Heart" | Bonnie Tyler | 4:30 |
| 9. | "Karma Chameleon" | Culture Club | 3:53 |
| 10. | "The Safety Dance" | Men Without Hats | 2:47 |
| 11. | "Too Shy" | Kajagoogoo | 3:41 |
| 12. | "Moonlight Shadow" | Mike Oldfield | 3:37 |
| 13. | "Down Under" | Men at Work | 3:42 |
| 14. | "(Hey You) The Rock Steady Crew" | Rock Steady Crew | 3:46 |
| 15. | "Baby Jane" | Rod Stewart | 4:45 |
| 16. | "Wherever I Lay My Hat (That's My Home)" | Paul Young | 4:52 |

Record/Tape 2
| No. | Title | Artist | Length |
|---|---|---|---|
| 1. | "Candy Girl" | New Edition | 3:52 |
| 2. | "Big Apple" | Kajagoogoo | 4:12 |
| 3. | "Let's Stay Together" | Tina Turner | 3:36 |
| 4. | "(Keep Feeling) Fascination" | The Human League | 3:45 |
| 5. | "New Song" | Howard Jones | 4:16 |
| 6. | "Please Don't Make Me Cry" | UB40 | 3:26 |
| 7. | "Tonight, I Celebrate My Love" | Peabo Bryson & Roberta Flack | 3:29 |
| 8. | "They Don't Know" | Tracey Ullman | 3:00 |
| 9. | "Kissing with Confidence" | Will Powers | 3:54 |
| 10. | "That's All" | Genesis | 4:23 |
| 11. | "The Love Cats" | The Cure | 3:33 |
| 12. | "Waterfront" | Simple Minds | 4:40 |
| 13. | "The Sun and the Rain" | Madness | 3:30 |
| 14. | "Victims" | Culture Club | 4:56 |

== Now That's What I Call Music video ==
A video selection was also released featuring selected tracks from the main album, one track that later featured on Volume II of the series and two which did not appear on any Now album.

1. Phil Collins : "You Can't Hurry Love"
2. Duran Duran : "Is There Something I Should Know"
3. UB40 : "Red Red Wine"
4. Limahl : "Only for Love"
5. Heaven 17 : "Temptation"
6. Malcolm McLaren : "Double Dutch"
7. Culture Club : "Karma Chameleon"
8. Men Without Hats : "The Safety Dance"
9. Kajagoogoo : "Too Shy"
10. Mike Oldfield : "Moonlight Shadow"
11. Rock Steady Crew : "(Hey You) The Rock Steady Crew"
12. Tina Turner : "Let's Stay Together"
13. Freeez : "I.O.U." ^{†}
14. Howard Jones : "New Song"
15. UB40 : "Please Don't Make Me Cry"
16. Will Powers : "Kissing with Confidence"
17. Genesis : "That's All"
18. Kajagoogoo : "Big Apple"
19. The Assembly : "Never Never" ^{†}
20. Thompson Twins : "Hold Me Now" ^{††}
21. Peabo Bryson & Roberta Flack : "Tonight I Celebrate My Love"

† Never appeared on any of the numbered NOW albums but did appear on Now 1983 in the 10th Anniversary Series.

†† Later appeared on NOW 2.

== Charts ==
| Chart (1983–1984) | Peak position |
|---|---|
| UK Albums (OCC) | 1 |

| Chart (2018–2019) | Peak position |
|---|---|
| UK Compilation Albums (OCC) | 2 |
