= The Badloves =

Australian band

- Also known as: DC3
- Origin: Melbourne, Victoria, Australia
- Genres: Soul; blues; R&B; alternative rock
- Years active: 1990–1997; 2008–2010; 2014–present
- Labels: Warner; Mushroom; Festival Records; TCB
- Members: Michael Spiby; Kit Riley; Samuel Cope; Jeff Consi; Susie Ahern
- Past members: John "Jak" Housden; Stephen "Irish" O'Prey; James Ryan; John Spiby; Tony Featherstone; John Favaro; Chris Tabone; Robbie Ragg; David Hibbard
- Website: thebadloves.com.au

The Badloves are an Australian R&B, soul band that formed as DC3 in 1990 by founding mainstay member Michael Spiby on guitar and lead vocals. They changed their name after a year. Their debut studio album, Get on Board, was issued in July 1993, which peaked at No. 5 on the ARIA Albums Chart. At the ARIA Music Awards of 1994 they won Best New Talent and Breakthrough Artist – Album for Get on Board and Breakthrough Artist – Single for its first single, "Lost" (1993). The Badloves' second album, Holy Roadside (October 1995), reached the top 20. Their highest-charting single, "The Weight" (1993), is a cover version of the Band's 1968 single and features Jimmy Barnes on co-lead vocals. It reached the ARIA singles chart top 10.

== History ==
=== 1990–1994: Get on Board ===
The Badloves were formed in Melbourne in January 1990 as DC3, an R&B, soul band by John "Jak" Housden on lead guitar, Stephen "Irish" O'Prey on bass guitar, John Spiby on keyboards and saxophone, his brother Michael Spiby on lead vocals and guitar and Chris Tabone on drums. Housden, O'Prey and Michael Spiby were members of Daryl Braithwaite's touring band during 1989. After John Spiby left they changed their name to the Badloves and used a succession of temporary keyboardists. According to Australian musicologist, Ian McFarlane, they provided, "laid-back, 1970s-styled blues, Memphis soul and New Orleans R&B; material." Tony Featherstone, on Hammond organ and guitar, joined the group. The band were signed to Mushroom Records late in 1992 after label boss, Michael Gudinski, saw their support of United States visitors, Hall & Oates.

In March 1993 they released their debut single "Lost", which peaked at number 51 on the ARIA singles chart. "I Remember" was issued in May 1993 and reached number 48. Their debut album Get on Board appeared in July providing further singles "Green Limousine" (March) and "Memphis" (July). Bevan Hannan of The Canberra Times, observed, "[it] is brimming with a likeable cruising sound and should quickly, strike-up an urban chorus", which "gives off a similar feel to The Black Crowes, only the guitar artillery has been pruned back substantially. The similarities are the bluesy organ and soulful backing vocalists, although frontman [Spiby] is still very much the band's show-piece."

The band collaborated with Australian rock vocalist Jimmy Barnes n November 1993 for a cover version of the Band's 1968 single, "The Weight". Their version peaked at number 6 in following month. At the ARIA Music Awards of 1994 they won Best New Talent and Breakthrough Artist – Album for Get on Board and Breakthrough Artist – Single for "Lost". During 1994 they completed a European tour supporting Barnes and an Australian tour backing US singer, Lenny Kravitz. After the European tour O'Prey was replaced on bass guitar by John "Bullfrog" Favaro.

=== 1995–1997: Holy Roadside and Everybody Everywhere ===
The Badloves started recording their second album, Holy Roadside, in early 1995 with Doug Roberts producing. It was preceded by the single "Caroline" (August), and appeared in October. The Canberra Times' Liz Armitage felt, "The tracks are catchy and poppy" and "tight and well-polished" while the "lyrics reflect a honesty that's given weight with vocalist [Spiby]'s sensual voice." A limited-edition version of the album included the disc, Live in Amsterdam, which was recorded at Paradiso during European tour with Barnes in the previous year. In 1996 the band recorded another live album, at the Continental Café in Melbourne which was released in 1997 as Everybody Everywhere. Later that year the band dissolved, each member following individual pursuits.

=== 1998–2013: Occasional reforming and Best Ofs ===
In November 1998, The band regroups to play at the Mushroom Records 25th Anniversary Concert in November. In 2000 Michael Spiby releases his first solo album, Ho's Kitchen. The band's first greatest hits album was released in November 2000 under the title The Mushroom Tapes. In June 2002, the band briefly reformed, recorded and release an EP titled 14. In September 2004, The Mushroom Tapes was re-released as The Definitive Collection.

The Badloves re-formed in September 2008 and performed limited live shows in Sydney and Melbourne. The line-up for these shows was: Michael Spiby (vocals and guitar), John Favaro (bass), Tony Featherstone (keys), Robbie Ragg (keys), Jak Housden (guitar) and Dave Hibbard (drums). In July 2010, The Badloves officially broke up again.

=== 2014–present: Reformation ===
In November 2014, The Badloves reformed again. In 2016, a live album recorded at The Caravan Music Club was released. In October 2019, The Badloves released "Soulbrothertruckin'song", their first single in over 20 years. This was followed by "Tribal" in July 2020.

== Members ==
=== Current ===
- Michael Spiby – vocals, guitar (1990–)
- James Ryan – guitar, vocals (2018–)
- Kit Riley – bass, vocals (2019–)
- Samuel Cope & Tim Neal – organ, vocals (2020–)
- Jeff Consi – drums, vocals (2015–)
- Susie Ahern – backing vocals (1992, 2020–)

=== Past ===
- Jak Housden – guitar, vocals (1990–1996, 2000, 2008–2011)
- John Spiby – keyboards, saxophone (1990–1991)
- Chris Tabone – drums, percussion (1990–1996, 2000)
- John Favaro – bass, vocals (1994–1996, 2000, 2008–2010)
- Tony Featherstone – keyboards (1991–1996, 2000, 2008–2011, 2014–2020)
- Stephen "Irish" O'Prey – bass, vocals (1990–1994, 2014–2020)
- Robbie Ragg – keyboards (1994–1996, 2008–2010)
- Adam Rigley – keyboards (2016–2018)
- Dave Hibbard – drums (2008–2011)

== Discography ==
=== Studio albums ===
Title	Album details	Peak chart positions	Certifications
Title	Album details	AUS	Certifications
Get on Board	Released: 26 July 1993; Formats: CD, Cassette, LP; Label: Mushroom Records	5	ARIA: 2× Platinum
Holy Roadside	Released: 23 October 1995; Formats: CD, Cassette, LP; Label: Mushroom Records	14	ARIA: Gold

=== Live albums ===
Title	Album details	Peak chart positions
Title	Album details	AUS
Everybody Everywhere	Released: 14 April 1997; Formats: CD + VHS; Label: Mushroom Records	82
Raw Honey	Released: October 2016; Formats: CD, DD; Label: Michael Spiby	—

=== Compilation albums ===
Title	Album details
The Mushroom Tapes	Released: October 2000; Formats: CD; Label: Mushroom Records
The Definitive Collection	Released: September 2004; Formats: CD, download; Label: Festival Records, Warner Music Australia

=== Extended plays ===
Title	Album details
14	Released: March 2002; Formats: CD, download; Label: TCB (TCB7009)
Gimme 5	Released: March 2007; Formats: DD; Label: Warner Music Australia

=== Singles ===
Title	Year	Peak chart positions	Certifications	Album
Title	Year	AUS	Certifications	Album
"Lost"	1993	51		Get on Board
"I Remember"	1993	48		Get on Board
"The Weight" (with Jimmy Barnes)	1993	6	ARIA: Gold	Flesh and Wood
"Green Limousine"	1993	35		Get on Board
"Memphis"	1994	73		Get on Board
"Caroline"	1995	65		Holy Roadside
"Slave"	1995	—		Holy Roadside
"Living Things"	1996	—		Holy Roadside
"Barefoot Bride"	1996	75		Holy Roadside
"Soulbrothertruckinsong"	2019	—		TBA
"Tribal"	2020	—		TBA

== ARIA Awards ==
The ARIA Music Awards is an annual awards ceremony that recognises excellence, innovation, and achievement across all genres of Australian music. The Badloves have won 3 award from 8 nominations.

Year	Nominee / work	Award	Result
1994	Get on Board	Album of the Year	Nominated
1994	Get on Board	Best New Talent	Won
1994	Get on Board	Breakthrough Artist - Album	Won
1994	"Lost"	Single of the Year	Nominated
1994	"Lost"	Breakthrough Artists - Single	Won
1995	Get on Board	Highest Selling Album	Nominated
1996	Holy Roadside	Best Group	Nominated
1996	The Badloves, Doug Roberts for Holy Roadside	Producer of the Year	Nominated
