= Defryme =

Australian band

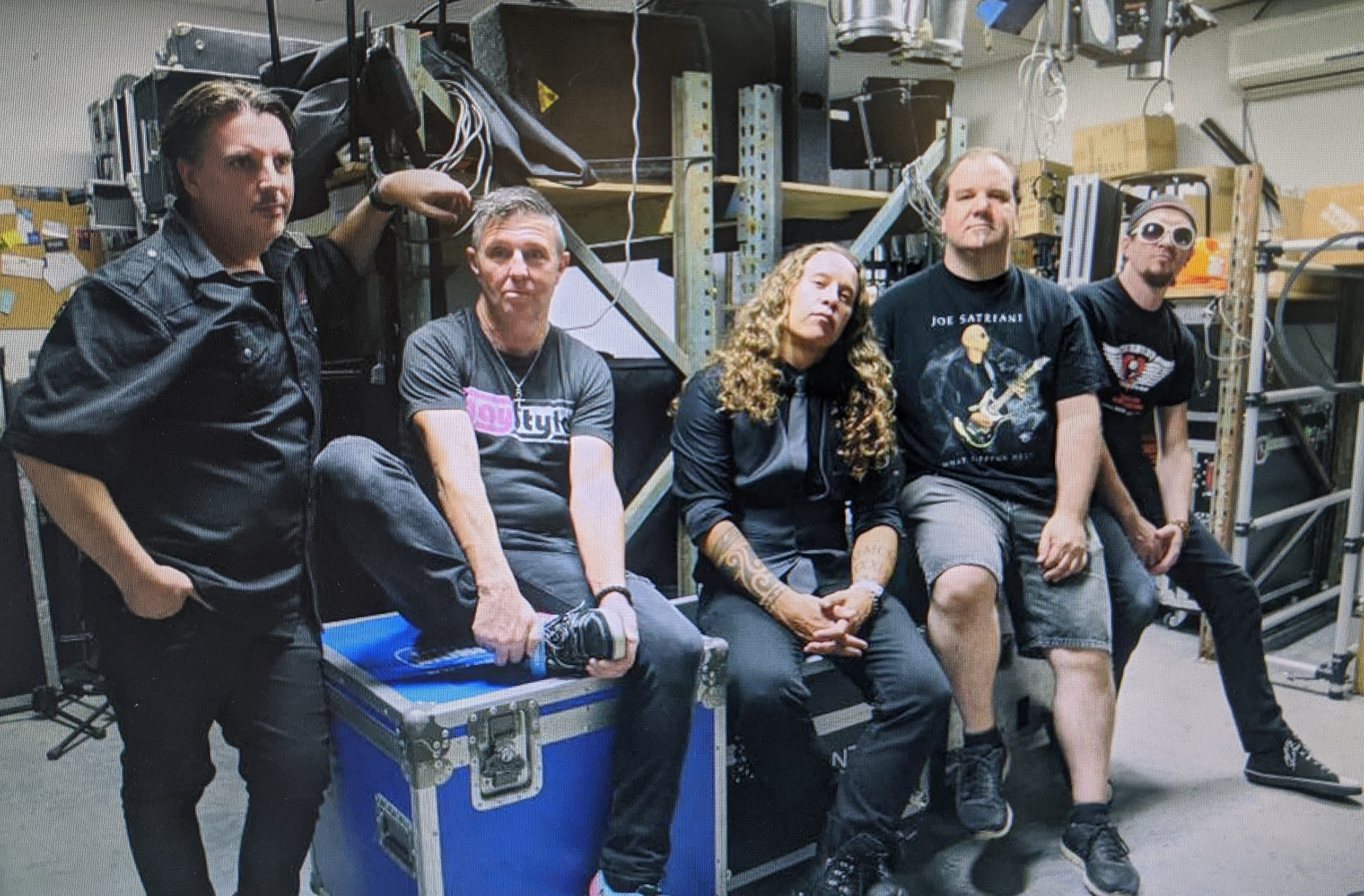
- Defryme 2019

Background information
- Origin: Melbourne, Victoria, Australia
- Genres: Hard rock, funk metal
- Years active: 1989-1994, periodically
- Labels: R Dog, BMG, Epic Theatre
- Members: Quinn Gardener-Kane (vocals); Geoff Mison (drums); David Beaton (bass); Nicholas Von Stav (guitar)
- Past members: John Hall (drums); Glen Millen (keyboards); Grant Miller (drums); Frank Bajsar (sax); Jade Burton (vocals); Rob Dexter (guitar); Andrew Duganzich (guitar/keys); Michael Richardson (bass); TJ Regan (guitar

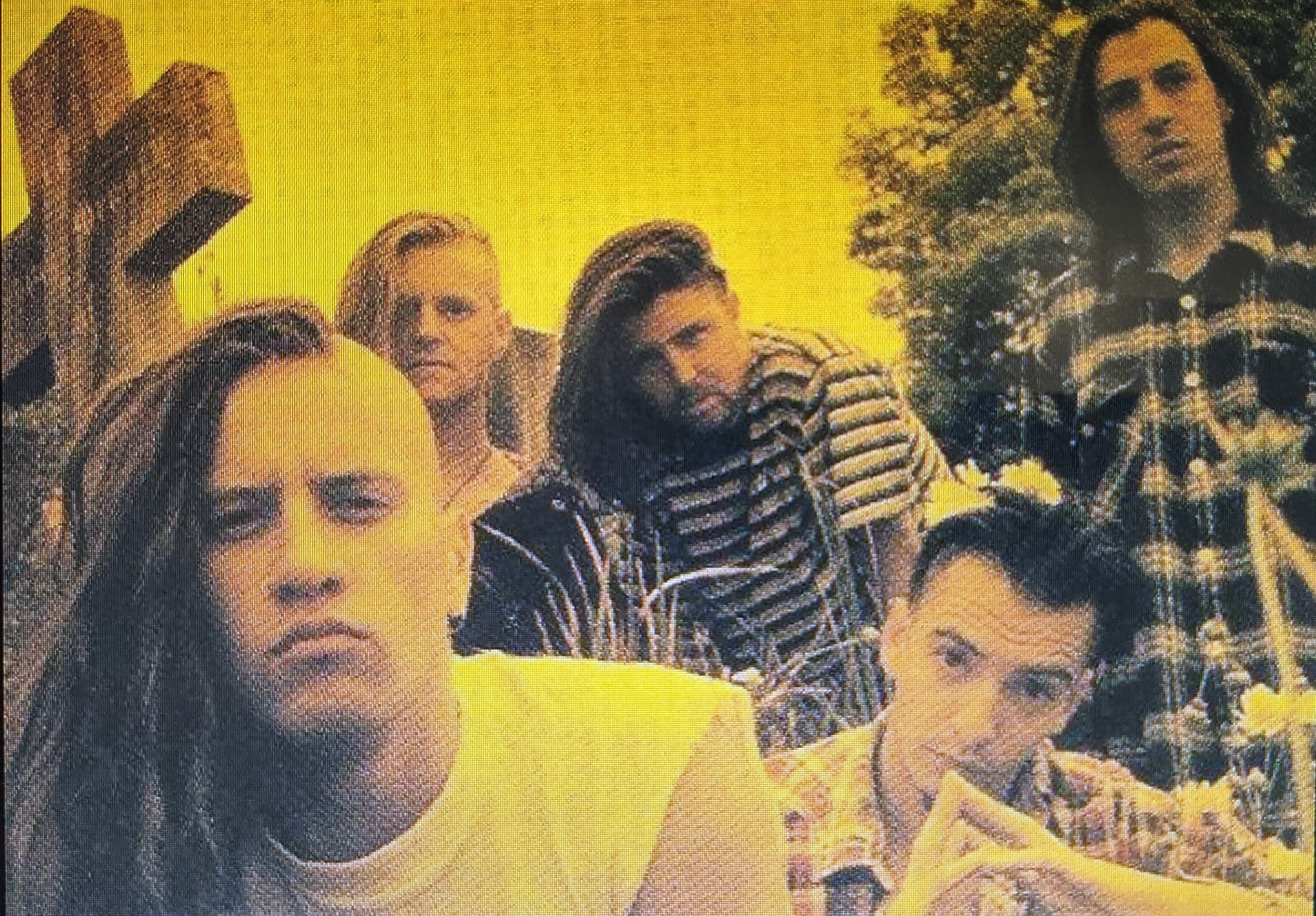
Circa 1994

Defryme are an Australian band from Melbourne, Victoria. They formed in 1989 in the Melbourne suburb of Frankston. Their album Purekiller reached #4 on the Australian ARIA album charts in June 1994. They had four charting singles in Australia, "God Inside A Man" (#51), "Pure Killer" (#70), their cover of L.L. Cool J's "Mama Said Knock You Out" (#38), and "Sanity" (#70).

Defryme reformed in 2010 with the release of the single "Sup?" and a handful of shows.

In 2014 Defryme re-emerged in 2014 with a string of live shows in Melbourne and Sydney performing the Purekiller album in entirety and released another single "Audrey".

In 2021, the lineup of Defryme changed and they released "The Snake". In March 2024, they released the EP Starkiller.

== Discography ==
=== Albums ===
List of albums, with selected chart positions
Title	Album details	Peak chart positions
Title	Album details	AUS
Purekiller	Released: June 1994; Label: BMG Australia (74321190532); Format: CD	4

=== Extended plays ===
List of EPs, with selected details
Title	Details
Stylo Curiae	Released: 1992; Label: R. Dog (RDOG001); Format: CD
Starkiller	Released: March 2024; Label: Golden Robot; Format: digital

=== Singles ===
List of singles, with selected chart positions
Title	Year	Peak chart positions	Album
Title	Year	AUS	Album
"Therapy?"	1992	—	Stylo Curiae
"God Inside of a Man"	1993	51	Purekiller
"Pure Killer"	1993	70	Purekiller
"Mama Said Knock You Out"	1994	38	Purekiller
"Sanity"	1994	70	Purekiller
"Sup'"	2010	—	Non-album singles
"Audrey"	2011	—	Non-album singles
"The Snake"	2022	—	Non-album singles
