= 100% Hits: The Best of 2007 =

Compilation album by Various Artists
- Released: 9 November 2007
- Label: EMI Music / Warner Music Australia

Series chronology
100% Hits: The Best of 2006 (2006)	100% Hits: The Best of 2007 (2007)	100% Hits: The Best of 2008 (2008)

100% Hits: The Best of 2007 is a 2-disc compilation album released by EMI Music Australia and Warner Music Australia. The album was the #10 compilation album on the year-end charts in Australia for the year 2007 (see 2007 in music). It has also been certified platinum in Australia for selling over 70,000 units.

== Track listing ==
=== Disk 1 ===
1. Silverchair – "Straight Lines" (4:16)
2. Kisschasy – "Opinions Won't Keep You Warm at Night" (3:04)
3. Thirsty Merc – "20 Good Reasons" (3:46)
4. Missy Higgins – "Steer" (3:47)
5. Ben Lee – "Love Me Like the World Is Ending" (3:44)
6. Sneaky Sound System – "UFO" (3:43)
7. Alex Gaudino featuring Crystal Waters – "Destination Calabria" (2:59)
8. Fedde Le Grand – "Put Your Hands Up 4 Detroit" (2:24)
9. Bob Sinclar and Cutee B featuring Dollarman, Big Ali and Makedah – "Rock This Party (Everybody Dance Now)" (3:17)
10. Ricki-Lee – "Can't Touch It" (2:52)
11. Robbie Williams – "Lovelight" (3:59)
12. Gym Class Heroes – "Clothes Off!!" (3:40)
13. Jamelia – "Something About You" (3:21)
14. Lily Allen – "LDN" (3:09)
15. Evermore – "Never Let You Go" (4:14)
16. Thirty Seconds to Mars – "The Kill" (3:51)
17. Mims – "This Is Why I'm Hot" (4:16)
18. Cassie – "Me & U" (3:12)
19. Joss Stone – "Tell Me 'bout It" (2:50)
20. Hilary Duff – "With Love" (3:01)
21. Gia Farrell – "Hit Me Up" (3:14)
22. Fonzerelli – "Moonlight Party" (Aaron McClelland Summer Mix) (2:53)
23. Armand Van Helden – "NYC Beat" (3:10)

=== Disk 2 ===
1. KT Tunstall – "Suddenly I See" (3:11)
2. The Cat Empire – "No Longer There" (3:45)
3. Eskimo Joe – "Sarah" (3:29)
4. Operator Please – "Just a Song About Ping Pong" (2:17)
5. John Butler Trio – "Funky Tonight" (3:40)
6. The Beautiful Girls – "I Thought About You" (3:11)
7. The Waifs – "Sun Dirt Water" (3:34)
8. Paolo Nutini – "Jenny Don't Be Hasty" (3:26)
9. Regina Spektor – "Fidelity" (3:46)
10. Josh Pyke – "Lines on Palms" (3:00)
11. Crowded House – "Don't Stop Now" (3:51)
12. Katie Noonan – "Time to Begin" (3:38)
13. Paul Kelly – "God Told Me To" (3:39)
14. Jet – "Rip It Up" (3:20)
15. Airbourne – "Too Much, Too Young, Too Fast" (3:42)
16. The Used – "The Bird and the Worm" (3:46)
17. Panic! at the Disco – "But It's Better If You Do" (3:27)
18. Garbage – "Tell Me Where It Hurts" (4:07)
19. The Chemical Brothers – "Do It Again" (3:35)
20. Bodyrox featuring Luciana – "Yeah Yeah" (D. Ramirez Radio Edit) (2:38)
21. David Guetta vs. The Egg – "Love Don't Let Me Go (Walking Away)" (Joachim Garraud Radio Edit) (3:14)
22. Cascada – "Everytime We Touch" (3:17)
23. Eric Prydz vs. Floyd – "Proper Education" (3:19)
