= 100% Hits: The Best of 2006 =

Compilation album by Various Artists
- Released: 20 November 2006
- Length: 79:48 (CD1); 78:53 (CD2)
- Label: EMI / Warner Music Australia

Series chronology
100% Hits: The Best of 2005 (2005)	100% Hits: The Best of 2006 (2006)	100% Hits: The Best of 2007 (2007)

100% Hits: The Best of 2006 is a 2-disc compilation album released on 20 November 2006 by EMI Music Australia and Warner Music Australia. It peaked at No. 3 on the ARIA Compilations Chart and remained in the top 10 for 13 weeks. The album was the No. 14 compilation album on the year-end charts in Australia for the year 2006 (see 2006 in music), and No. 43 in 2007. It has also been certified platinum in Australia for shipment of over 70,000 units.

== Track listing ==
=== CD 1 ===
1. Eskimo Joe – "Black Fingernails, Red Wine" (4:05)
2. Bob Sinclar featuring Gary Pine – "Love Generation" (3:25)
3. The Veronicas – "4ever" (3:29)
4. Evermore – "Running" (4:21)
5. Lily Allen – "Smile" (3:14)
6. Youth Group – "Forever Young" (4:30)
7. Panic! at the Disco – "I Write Sins Not Tragedies" (3:06)
8. The Living End – "Wake Up" (4:31)
9. Sean Paul – "Temperature" (3:36)
10. Pharrell featuring Gwen Stefani – "Can I Have It Like That" (3:56)
11. Vandalism – "Never Say Never" (2:53)
12. Mylo vs. Miami Sound Machine – "Doctor Pressure" (3:25)
13. Fort Minor featuring Holly Brook and Jonah Matranga – "Where'd You Go" (3:52)
14. Simple Plan – "Crazy" (3:36)
15. End of Fashion – "The Game" (2:42)
16. The Darkness – "Is It Just Me?" (3:05)
17. Mousse T. vs. The Dandy Warhols – "Horny as a Dandy" (3:14)
18. Paris Hilton – "Stars Are Blind" (3:57)
19. Hilary Duff – "Wake Up" (3:36)
20. Fast Crew – "Suburbia Streets" (4:22)
21. Stacie Orrico – "I'm Not Missing You" (3:40)
22. DHT featuring Edmée – "Listen to Your Heart" (3:15)

Source: Australian Charts Portal.

=== CD 2 ===
1. Gnarls Barkley – "Crazy" (2:59)
2. Robbie Williams – "Tripping" (4:03)
3. Madonna – "Sorry" (3:58)
4. James Blunt – "Goodbye My Lover" (3:54)
5. Corinne Bailey Rae – "Put Your Records On" (3:34)
6. Coldplay – "Talk" (4:26)
7. Rob Thomas – "Ever the Same" (4:17)
8. KT Tunstall – "Suddenly I See" (3:11)
9. The Sleepy Jackson – "God Lead Your Soul" (3:27)
10. Bob Evans – "Don't You Think It's Time?" (3:17)
11. Kasey Chambers – "Nothing at All" (3:20)
12. Kisschasy – "The Shake" (3:57)
13. The Whitlams – "I Was Alive" (3:04)
14. The Kooks – "Naïve" (3:23)
15. Muse – "Supermassive Black Hole" (3:29)
16. Placebo – "Song to Say Goodbye" (3:34)
17. Yellowcard – "Lights and Sounds" (3:27)
18. Butterfingers – "Get Up Outta the Dirt" (4:14)
19. Infernal – "From Paris to Berlin" (3:28)
20. Paul Mac featuring Aaradhna – "Love Declaration" (3:50)
21. Hi_Tack – "Say Say Say (Waiting 4 U)" (2:51)
22. The Source featuring Candi Staton – "You Got the Love" (New Voyager Mix) (3:12)

Source: Australian Charts Portal.
