= Now That's What I Call Music! 37 (American series) =

Compilation album by various artists
- Released: February 8, 2011
- Length: 72:35
- Label: EMI

Series chronology
Now That's What I Call Music! 36 (2010)	Now That's What I Call Music! 37 (2011)	Now That's What I Call Music! 38 (2011)

Now That's What I Call Music! 37 was released on February 8, 2011. The album is the 37th edition of the (U.S.) Now! series. Seven tracks selected for the album were number-one hits on the Billboard Hot 100: "Love the Way You Lie", "Just the Way You Are", "Firework", "Raise Your Glass", "We R Who We R", "Only Girl (In the World)" and "Like a G6".

Now! 37 debuted at number one on the Billboard 200 albums chart with first week sales of 151,000, the biggest week for any US-released Now album since Now! 31 started at number one with 169,000 in July 2009.

== Reception ==
Professional ratings
Review scores
Source	Rating
AllMusic	3.5/5 stars

With several number-one pop hits, Andy Kellman of Allmusic calls Now! 37 "one of the most enjoyable Now volumes of the last few years."

== Track listing ==
No.	Title	Artist	Length
1.	"Love the Way You Lie"	Eminem featuring Rihanna	4:22
2.	"Just the Way You Are"	Bruno Mars	3:35
3.	"Firework"	Katy Perry	3:45
4.	"Raise Your Glass"	Pink	3:20
5.	"We R Who We R"	Kesha	3:24
6.	"Only Girl (In the World)"	Rihanna	3:52
7.	"Like a G6"	Far East Movement featuring The Cataracs & Dev	3:36
8.	"Hey Baby (Drop It to the Floor)"	Pitbull featuring T-Pain	3:24
9.	"Yeah 3x"	Chris Brown	3:58
10.	"Stereo Love"	Edward Maya and Vika Jigulina	3:04
11.	"Whip My Hair"	Willow Smith	3:13
12.	"No Hands"	Waka Flocka Flame featuring Roscoe Dash & Wale	4:22
13.	"Bottoms Up"	Trey Songz featuring Nicki Minaj	3:59
14.	"Please Don't Go"	Mike Posner	3:15
15.	"Love Like Woe"	The Ready Set	3:19
16.	"Mine"	Taylor Swift	3:59
17.	"Waiting Outside the Lines"	Greyson Chance	3:51
18.	"Loving You Tonight"	Andrew Allen	2:59
19.	"My Girl"	Mindless Behavior	3:59
20.	"This or That"	Jacob Latimore	3:18

== Charts ==
=== Weekly charts ===
Chart (2011)	Peak position
US Billboard 200	1

=== Year-end charts ===
Chart (2011)	Position
US Billboard 200	32
