= Caroline (The Badloves song) =

1995 single by the Badloves

Single by the Badloves

from the album Holy Roadside
- B-side: "Don't Throw Roses"; "Flying"; "Burnout"
- Released: 28 August 1995
- Length: 3:05
- Label: Mushroom
- Songwriters: David Byrne; Michael Spiby
- Producers: The Badloves; Doug Roberts

The Badloves singles chronology
"Memphis" (1995)	"Caroline" (1995)	"Slave" (1995)

"Caroline" is a song by Australian band the Badloves, released in August 1995 as the lead single from the band's second studio album, Holy Roadside (1995). The song peaked at number 63 on the Australian ARIA Singles Chart.

== Track listing ==
Australian maxi-CD single

1. "Caroline" – 3:05
2. "Don't Throw Roses" – 3:37
3. "Flying" – 3:07
4. "Burnout" – 3:05

== Charts ==
Chart (1995)	Peak position
Australia (ARIA)	63
