= Green Limousine =

1993 single by the Badloves

Single by the Badloves

from the album Get on Board
- B-side: "For What It's Worth"; "Yesterday's Gone"; "Sugar Daddy"; "I Embarrass Myself"
- Released: 29 November 1993
- Studio: Metropolis Audio (Melbourne, Australia)
- Length: 3:48
- Label: Mushroom
- Songwriter: Michael Spiby
- Producers: The Badloves; Doug Roberts

The Badloves singles chronology
"The Weight" (1993)	"Green Limousine" (1993)	"Memphis" (1994)

"Green Limousine" is a song by Australian band the Badloves, released in November 1993 as the third single from the band's debut studio album, Get on Board (1993). The song peaked at number 35 on the Australian ARIA Singles Chart in January 1994.

== Background ==
On the album liner notes, the band says, "This song offers a wry comment on the willingness of certain celebrities to jump on the bandwagon of any fashionable cause. Doffing their collective caps to the traditions of 60s soul, the band took 12 hours to record the piece... it started as a pop, soul thing and we progressively stripped it back."

== Track listing ==
CD and cassette single

1. "Green Limousine" – 3:48
2. "For What It's Worth" – 3:24
3. "Yesterday's Gone" – 5:38
4. "Sugar Daddy" – 5:29
5. "I Embarrass Myself" – 3:40

== Charts ==
Chart (1994)	Peak position
Australia (ARIA)	35
