= Now That's What I Call Music! 36 (American series) =

Compilation album by various artists
- Released: November 9, 2010
- Length: 73:39
- Label: EMI

Series chronology
Now That's What I Call Music! 35 (2010)	Now That's What I Call Music! 36 (2010)	Now That's What I Call Music! 37 (2011)

Now That's What I Call Music! 36 was released on November 9, 2010. The album is the 36th edition of the (U.S.) Now! series. With first week sales of 89,000, Now! 36 debuted at number four on the Billboard 200 albums chart. The album includes the number-one Billboard Hot 100 hit, "Teenage Dream". "Suspicious Minds", a number-one hit in 1969 by Elvis Presley, is presented here as a "flashback bonus track" in a remixed Viva Elvis arrangement.

== Track listing ==
No.	Title	Artist	Length
1.	"Teenage Dream"	Katy Perry	3:47
2.	"DJ Got Us Fallin' in Love"	Usher featuring Pitbull	3:39
3.	"Take It Off"	Ke$ha	3:31
4.	"If I Had You"	Adam Lambert	3:44
5.	"Dynamite"	Taio Cruz	3:36
6.	"Just a Dream"	Nelly	3:55
7.	"Deuces"	Chris Brown featuring Tyga and Kevin McCall	4:34
8.	"Magic"	B.o.B featuring Rivers Cuomo	3:13
9.	"Memories"	David Guetta featuring Kid Cudi	3:28
10.	"Misery"	Maroon 5	3:26
11.	"Animal"	Neon Trees	3:30
12.	"Secrets"	OneRepublic	3:42
13.	"King of Anything"	Sara Bareilles	3:25
14.	"The Only Exception"	Paramore	4:24
15.	"September"	Daughtry	3:57
16.	"Stuck Like Glue"	Sugarland	4:16
17.	"Maybe"	Sick Puppies	3:20
18.	"Bang Pop"	Free Energy	3:37
19.	"Tennessee Me"	The Secret Sisters	2:20
20.	"Suspicious Minds" (Viva Elvis remix)	Elvis Presley	4:15

== Reception ==
Professional ratings
Review scores
Source	Rating
Allmusic	2.5/5 stars

Andrew Leahey of Allmusic says "this compilation covers the usual ground" with the number-one hit "Teenage Dream" and "a handful of Top Ten singles ... thrown into the mix".

== Charts ==
=== Weekly charts ===
Chart (2010)	Peak position
US Billboard 200	4

=== Year-end charts ===
Chart (2011)	Position
US Billboard 200	52
