= Now 01 (Australian series) =

2002 compilation album by various artists

Compilation album by Various Artists
- Released: 12 August 2002
- Label: EMI

Series chronology
Now 01 (2002)	Now 02 (2002)

Now 01 is a compilation CD released by EMI Music Australia and Warner Music Australia in 2002. It was the first of the new compilation series to replace the long running 100% Hits series. The front cover says that the album is "powered by Hot30 Countdown." A launch party was set up for the album. The album reached number 19 on the 2002 ARIA Year End Compilation Album chart and was certified platinum.

== Track listing ==
1. Fat Joe featuring Ashanti and Ja Rule – "What's Luv?" (3:52)
2. Britney Spears – "I Love Rock 'n' Roll" (3:08)
3. Blue – "Fly By II" (Stargate Trilogy Mix) (3:41)
4. Disco Montego featuring Katie Underwood – "Beautiful" (3:42)
5. Scott Cain – "I'm Moving On" (3:33)
6. Atomic Kitten – "It's OK!" (3:20)
7. Michelle Branch – "All You Wanted" (3:39)
8. Moony – "Dove (I'll Be Loving You)" (4:03)
9. Brandy – "What About Us?" (4:12)
10. Alanis Morissette – "Hands Clean" (4:32)
11. Tweet featuring Missy Elliott – "Oops (Oh My)" (4:00)
12. Lasgo – "Something" (3:43)
13. Robbie Williams – "Let Love Be Your Energy" (4:07)
14. Daniel Bedingfield – "Gotta Get Thru This" (2:44)
15. Missy Elliott – "4 My People" (Basement Jaxx Radio Edit) (3:38)
16. Moby – "We Are All Made of Stars" (3:36)
17. Mis-Teeq – "B with Me" (4:19)
18. Alex Lloyd – "Green" (4:05)
19. B. J. Caruana – "Dance All Night" (3:56)
20. P.O.D. – "Youth of the Nation" (4:16)
