= Michael Spiby =

- Genres: Rock, Adult Contemporary

Michael Spiby is an Australian musician and a founding member of The Badloves. He released his debut single "(All my Love) Ella" in 1999 and solo album, Ho's Kitchen, in 2000 and it was nominated for the 2000 ARIA Award for Best Adult Contemporary Album.

== Discography ==
=== Albums ===
List of albums, with selected chart positions
| Title | Details |
|---|---|
| Ho's Kitchen | Released: May 2000; Label: Mushroom Records (MUSH332622); Format: CD |
| Come In Spinner More (with Susie Ahern) | Released: April 2002; Label: ABC Music (12742); Format: CD |
| Barefoot | Released: 2006; Label: Liberation Blue (BLUE078.2); Format: CD |

== Awards and nominations ==
| Year | Nominee / work | Award | Result |
|---|---|---|---|
| 2000 | Ho's Kitchen | Best Adult Contemporary Album | Nominated |
