= Now That's What I Call Music! =

UK compilation album series

Now That's What I Call Music! (often shortened to NOW) is a series of various artists compilation albums released in the United Kingdom and Ireland by Sony Music and Universal Music (Universal/Sony Music) which began in 1983. Spinoff series began for other countries the following year, starting with South Africa, and many other countries worldwide soon followed, expanding into Asia in 1995, then the United States in 1998.

The compilation series was conceived in the office of Virgin Records in London and took its name from a 1930s British advertising poster for Danish bacon featuring a pig saying "Now, That's What I Call Music" as it listened to a chicken singing. The pig became the mascot for the series, making its last regular appearance on Now That's What I Call Music 5, before reappearing on the 100th edition in 2018, and again since 2021.

== Original United Kingdom and Ireland series ==
=== Conception of Now That’s What I Call Music! series ===
In 1983, the ideas of the Now That’s What I Call Music! series were conceived in Richard Branson's Virgin Records offices, in Vernon Yard, near Portobello Road in Notting Hill, London. The co-creators behind this idea were Stephen Navin, Head of Licensing and Business Affairs at Virgin Records from 1979 to 1990, and Jon Webster, General Manager from 1983 to 1988. The concept found resonance with Simon Draper, the Managing Director of Virgin Records from 1979 to 1990.

Despite having so many songs high up in the charts, they were tired of third party labels using their hits and making money out of their success.

They managed to convince EMI, where Peter Jamieson, the Managing Director of EMI Records from 1983 to 1986, was captivated by Virgin’s innovative ideas on a compilation album. The partnership materialised during negotiations on Richard Branson’s boat in Little Venice.

I took the poster back to the Virgin Records office as a gift to Simon Draper, who ran our label with me. We were riding high in the charts with everyone from Phil Collins to Culture Club, UB40 to The Human League. But we were tired of third party labels using our hits and making money out of our success. We knew we could do it better, so we decided to make our own compilation albums. We convinced EMI to partner with us on it, so we could get all the biggest hits of the day onto one record. Now, all we needed was a name. There on the wall was the Danish Bacon poster. Suddenly, we had our name: NOW That’s What I Call Music! We released it in time for Christmas, selling one million copies in the process.

— Richard Branson, "Now That's What I Call Music! Turns 40"

==== The naming inspiration ====
Amidst the conception of the series, the name found its roots in a distinctive source. An old 1930s Danish Bacon poster featuring a pig saying "Now, That's What I Call Music" as it listened to a chicken singing, discovered by Branson in an antiques shop not far from their Vernon yard office, where a woman he liked named Joan Templeman was working.

Branson managed to amass an impressive collection of old hand painted tin signs that were covering his houseboat, but instead of adding to his collection, he gifted it to Simon Draper. The poster was hung behind Draper's desk at the Virgin Records office. Branson wrote, "He was notoriously grumpy before breakfast and loved his eggs in the morning, so I bought him the poster, framed it and had it hung behind his desk."

The pig became the mascot for the series, making its last regular appearance on Now That's What I Call Music 5, and made a reappearance on the cover of Now That's What I Call Music! 100 in 2018 and Now That's What I Call Music! 109 in 2021.

Richard Branson later married Joan Templeman in 1989.

=== Commercial success ===
The first Now was released on 28 November 1983 and featured 30 UK hit singles from that year on a double vinyl LP or cassette. Although the compilation of recent hit songs into a single release was not a new concept (K-tel and Ronco, for example, had been issuing various-artist compilations for some years), this was the first time that two major record labels had collaborated on such a venture. Virgin agreed to a deal with EMI, which allowed a greater number of major hits to be included (the first album in the series included a total of "eleven number ones" on its sleeve). The album went to number one, and soon after, CBS/WEA's The Hits Album adopted a similar format to Now. The two series co-existed for the rest of the 1980s, and when Universal (formerly PolyGram from Now 8 in 1986 through to Now 42 in 1999) joined the collaboration, the Now series was more successful commercially. The Out Now series by MCA and Chrysalis was also established as a rival to the series, but was short-lived and lasted only two volumes.

By 1989, Now, Hits, and other various-artist compilation albums were occupying such a large fraction of the UK Albums Chart that a separate UK Compilation Chart was created to restrict the Albums Chart to releases by a single act.

The rate of release settled very quickly to three per year: one release around late March/early April, another around late July and a third around late November. Over a hundred "main series" (not including spin-off and special edition) albums have been released to date. The UK series has followed a double-album format throughout the series (many other foreign franchises of the Now series are only released on one disc), now exploiting the capacity of the CD to include between 40 and 46 tracks over two discs. Since July 2006 (Now That's What I Call Music! 64), the Now! series have only been released on CD and digital download formats. Previously, the series had been available on vinyl, cassette and MiniDisc, until these formats declined in popularity.

Peter Duckworth and Steve Pritchard have been managing the Now brand since Now 17. Mark Goodier has voiced the Now adverts since Now That's What I Call Music! 21 in 1992, when he worked for BBC Radio 1, with the exception of Now That's What I Call Music! 95 in 2016, which was voiced by Matt Edmondson due to Goodier suffering a stroke around that time. Ashley Abram of Box Music compiled the albums from Now That's What I Call Music II in 1984 through to Now That's What I Call Music! 81 in 2012. Jenny Fisher took over as the compiler beginning with Now That's What I Call Music! 82.

On 23 October 2013, the NOW Music television channel was launched in the UK. Targeting a broad age group, the channel used to play current popular music in the daytime and hits from its 30-year back catalogue in the evenings. It was renamed to Now 80s on 27 December 2016. Its success has led to two more branded channels exploring decades, Now 90s on 27 December 2017, replacing Chilled TV, and Now 70s on 27 December 2019, replacing Total Country.

=== Records/achievements ===
The most successful volume to date is 1999's Now That's What I Call Music! 44, which sold 2.3 million copies and remains the biggest-selling various artists compilation album in the UK. 2008's Now That's What I Call Music! 70 sold 383,002 units in the first week of sales, the biggest ever first week sale of any Now album.

=== Most featured artists ===
As of July 2026, the most featured artists are Robbie Williams with 40 followed by Kylie Minogue and Calvin Harris with 35 singles, David Guetta with 33, Rihanna with 27, Katy Perry with 23 and Girls Aloud with 21. This does not include any uncredited appearances on charity records.

=== Legacy ===
Now 5 (1985) was ranked that year's seventh best album in the sixth annual Smash Hits readers poll, while Now 7 (1986) was a runner-up in the following year's edition. The singer Liz McClarnon credits Now 20 (1991) for helping her join the group Atomic Kitten, after she sang Orchestral Manoeuvres in the Dark's "Sailing on the Seven Seas" to its composer and Atomic Kitten founder Andy McCluskey during her audition, impressing him; she had discovered the song through the compilation. Jeremy Cunningham of the indie band the Levellers cites the inclusion of their song "This Garden" on Now 26 (1993) as helping the band reach a wider audience, with their album and ticket sales increasing in the aftermath of its release. In 2017, sales of Now 48 (2001) surged after it was used as a plot device and soundtrack in an episode of Peter Kay's Car Share, whose central character Kayleigh Kitson names it her favourite album. Despite being out of print, second-hand sales were high enough to cause the album to enter Amazon's compilation chart, with prices rising from as low as 11 pence to over £20.

In August 2001, Chelsea F.C.'s official radio station Big Blue played the four-months-old Now 48 in its entirety several times, punctuated only with trailers and jingles.

== Formats ==
Although the albums started out on only vinyl records and cassette tapes, the formats on which the albums have been released have changed over the years:

- Unabridged (double CD) full versions of Now were first available starting with Now That's What I Call Music 10 in 1987, although a version of Now 4 was released on CD featuring songs that had appeared on the vinyl and cassette configurations of Nows 2, 3 and 4. Now That's What I Call Music 8 (17 tracks) and Now That's What I Call Music 9 (16 tracks) were released as single disc CDs in 1986 and 1987, respectively. A "Special Collectors Edition" of Now 1 was released on CD in 2009 as a digipak, 2015 and again in 2018 as a jewel case album.
- Vinyl editions of the main series ended in 1996 with Now That's What I Call Music! 35, though there have been spin-offs such as NOW presents the 70s, released as a five LP vinyl boxset by Sony/EMI in 2021.
- MiniDiscs started with Now That's What I Call Music! 43 in 1999 and ended with Now That's What I Call Music! 48 in 2001.
- The first Now album to be released as a digital download was Now That's What I Call Music! 62 in 2005 across online music stores.
- Cassette tapes ceased in 2006 with the final cassette being Now That's What I Call Music! 64.
- VHS tapes were released as companions to all the Now albums from the first volume through Now That's What I Call Music! 20, except for Now! That's What I Call Music 19. They contained music videos, some for tracks featured on the accompanying album and others for tracks not on the album. Some of the earlier volumes were also released on Betamax and the first two volumes laserdiscs were also released.

== Spin-offs ==
In addition to the main Now That's What I Call Music series, there have been a number of spin-off compilations in the UK using the name, including:

- Now Dance – a series in its own right, these compilations originally consisted of 12" mixes of current hits. They now focus on radio mixes of recent dance hits, and a Very Best of Now Dance compilation has been released.
- At least two different series of year-by-year "retrospective" compilations, covering 1983 to 1995 and 1980 to 1999, respectively were issued in the 1990s with the latter series known as Now - The Millennium Edition. In June 2021, the Now Yearbook series was launched. Starting with 1983, the series will cover each year in depth via compilations released on a four-CD boxset and 3 disc coloured vinyl LP set by Now Music, with a tie-in programme (featuring videos from the year in question) appearing on their Freeview TV channel. The original Now Yearbook 1983 could be initially ordered as a special book-style CD boxset, with the title joined a few months later by a standard CD boxset called Now Yearbook Extra 1983 which promised '60 more essential hits from 1983', and tracks like Kenny Everett's "Snot Rap", Roman Holliday's "Don't Try to Stop It" and "Friday Night" by the Kids from Fame.
- At least five "best-of" compilations including selected songs from the entire Now series. Now Decades, Now Years, Now 25 Years, Now 30 Years, and Now That's What I Call Now! (100 Hits from 100 Nows) are these five albums, but there have been other albums, like Now No.1's, which also cover the entire Now series.
- At least one tie-up with Smash Hits magazine in 1987, called Now Smash Hits. (Smash Hits later went on to release their own compilations).
- Christmas releases, including some classic Christmas favourites.
- Genre-based spin-offs are normally issued in the 2020s as 4CD sets, though Now That's What I Call Punk & New Wave was issued as a limited edition 2LP neon pink vinyl set with 34 songs from the standard compilation's 89 tracks.
- Sometimes considered a spin-off, video releases, including video cassette editions of many early Now compilations, and (more recently) yearly DVD video releases which run in 2001 until 2007.
- Other releases include Now Karaoke and the interactive DVD Now That's What I Call a Music Quiz.
- A series of compilation video games (for the Commodore 64, among other home computers) were released in the mid-1980s by Virgin Games with the name Now Games.
- A Wii game was released on 2 December 2011 named Now That's What I Call Music! - Dance and Sing. It features tracks by popular artists of the time, including Alexandra Burke, Jessie J, Lady Gaga, Rihanna, Tinie Tempah, Calvin Harris and Plan B. It features a Dance Mode, Sing Mode and Career Mode.
- In fall 2024, Now That's What I Call a Musical!, a jukebox musical based on the album series, made its stage debut.

== Record labels ==
The record labels which make up the UK series have changed over the years but have always been controlled by EMI and Virgin Records, although Virgin Records' logo was last featured on Now! 74 as the companies became merged. The current entity controlling the series is Now That's What I Call Music LLP, a joint venture between Sony Music and Universal's EMI label (the old EMI/Virgin/PolyGram bloc).

- Virgin Records: a label from Now 1 to Now 74. Until Now That's What I Call Music! 61, they used just the "Virgin" logo. From that volume onwards, the "Virgin Records" logo was used.
- EMI: a label on all volumes. Until Now 75, the logo they used was simply the "EMI" logo. From that volume onwards, "EMI TV"'s logo was used instead.
- PolyGram: a label from Now That's What I Call Music 8 to Now That's What I Call Music! 42.
- Universal Music: a label from Now That's What I Call Music! 43 onwards as a result of acquiring the Polygram label.
- Box Music Ltd.: were involved between 1984 and 2012, but it was Now That's What I Call Music! 26 onwards that their logo was used on the packaging.
- Music from EMI logo: It was used Now That's What I Call Music! 62 until Now 85 when they used the Sony label instead, until Now 90 when they stopped using labels on the main series.
- Sony BMG: used on the special edition of the album, Now! No.1s
- Universal Music Group (UMG): UMG purchasing of EMI in 2012, rights to a portion of the Now albums were transferred to Sony Music Entertainment (a partner in the original Hits Album brand). For a period, UMG used the brand of their catalog subsidiary, Universal Music TV (UMOD), on the Now series. However, by the 2020s, the EMI brand reappeared on certain Now spin-offs, including like Now Yearbook ’83 Extra, Now That’s What I Call Christmas and the re-issued Now That’s What I Call Music 10.
- Walt Disney Records: the label that released Now That's What I Call Disney.

== Series in other countries ==
Numerous different versions of the Now brand exist in other parts of the world, including:

- Arabia (under the name Now That's What I Call Arabia)
- Argentina
- Asia region
- Australia
- Canada
- China
- Czech Republic
- Denmark
- Egypt
- Finland
- France
- Greece
- Hungary
- Israel
- Italy
- Japan
- Korea (under the name Now That's What I Call K-Pop)
- Mexico
- Netherlands
- New Zealand
- Norway
- Philippines
- Poland
- Portugal
- Russia
- Singapore (also sold in neighboring Malaysia)
- South Africa
- Spain
- Turkey
- United States

=== Africa ===
==== South Africa ====
Volume one was released in 1984 (a year after the original UK series launched). Now 50, released in November 2008, was issued as a double CD in commemoration of 25 years of Now albums in South Africa, and double compact discs are every 3 albums through Now 80 released in November 2018 as the series switched to 2 in 2019, then one in 2020, the most recent Now Album to include a double disc was Now 83 this was also the last physical album to be released as further volumes are only available on streaming platforms. As of 2 September 2005, there has also been a Now DVD series.

=== Asia ===
==== Southeast Asia ====
This edition was released in Indonesia, Malaysia, Singapore, Taiwan, Hong Kong, Thailand, etc. The first Asian Now That's What I Call Music! was released in 1995.

The series is often called Now Asia due to the albums' origins:

- Now 1 and Now 2 were produced by EMI Hong Kong
- Now 3 and Now 4 were produced by EMI Malaysia
- Now 7 was produced by EMI Taiwan
- Now 5, Now 6, and Now 8 were produced by EMI Asia. The Indonesian versions of the albums differ slightly from the broader Asian releases.EMI Asia has also released Now Dance (2000), Now The Essential Collection (2003), Now+ volume 1 (2004) and Now+ volume 2 (2005).

EMI Indonesia has released Now Jazz (2007) and Now Arabia (2011).

==== China ====
Following its introduction in China, the Now series has enjoyed great success, with a new compilation released approximately every three to four months. Each album contains current and recent hit singles from Chinese artists signed to EMI or Polydor, and from British and Australian pop acts such as Kylie Minogue, Sophie Ellis-Bextor, Sugababes or Robbie Williams.

==== Israel ====
Now has been seen in Israel, starting in 1999. The first three albums are double discs. Now 4 was the first single disc and the rest in the series are also single disc.

==== South Korea ====
Now started in South Korea on 22 March 2015. The first three albums were double discs, under the name Now That's What I Call K-Pop.

=== Europe (in addition to UK & Irish series) ===
==== Czech Republic ====
Now Hity is the Czech version of the Now That's What I Call Music! series. Originally branded under the main family name, it was changed to Now Hity later in the run. There have also been spin-offs like Now 2006.

==== Denmark ====
Now Music is a Danish record label set up especially to release Now That's What I Call Music! albums in Denmark reaching the nineteenth edition in November 2007 not making anymore after that. As well as the Now regular series there have also been spin-offs including Now Big Hits, Now Christmas, Now Summer, Now Clubbing, Now Dance and Now Hip Hop.

Robbie Williams is the artist to be featured the most often in the regular Danish Now series, just as he also is in the UK Now! series. He has appeared ten times in the Danish series.

==== Finland ====
The first Finnish Now That's What I Call Music was released in 2003 where it replace the Absolute Hits series. The albums are released as double discs. There have also been spin-offs including Now That's What I Call Music Pop Hits and Now That's What I Call Dance Music.

==== France ====
In France the Now series is called Now! Hits Référence. There have been released Now! Hits Référence 1-7 and Now! Hits Référence 2005, 2006 and 2007.

==== Greece ====
In Greece the Now series is called Now: Αυτά Είναι Τα Hits Σήμερα! ("Now These Are the Hits Today!"). Now 1 was released in 2002 and Now 2010 was released in 2009. In 2015 (early summer), Now that's what i call music 2015 was released as a follow-up to the compilation series. There have also been released some Now Dance albums in Greece.

==== Netherlands ====
The Now series started in the Netherlands back in 1984 as Now This Is Music and a couple of spin-offs, such as Now Dance, a Christmas compilation (Now This Is Xmas) and several year-end compilations. The series ran from 1984 to 1989, ending with its 11th installment. The series was released on the EVA label, a joint venture of the Dutch branches of EMI, Sony and Ariola (later: BMG Ariola, a subsidiary of BMG/Warner Music Group). A second series under the same title started in 1997, but only two albums were released.

==== Norway ====
The Norwegian series of Now That's What I Call Music! is a joint venture by the Norwegian branches of Universal Music, Sony Music, EMI Music and Warner Music. Prior to 2009 they released two independent series called Absolute Music by EVA Records (EMI and Warner Music) and McMusic (Sony Music Entertainment AS and Universal Music Group AS).

The first issue of Now That's What I Call Music! in Norway was released in November 2009.

==== Portugal ====
The Now series in Portugal is a joint-venture between the three major international publishers present in Portugal – EMI, Sony and Universal. In 2010, it was announced that total sales of the series, not counting the extra editions, topped one million copies in Portugal. Through Volume 21 of the series, the multi-volume sets have included 414 national and international artists and a total of 787 different songs, ranking in an impressive four gold and 19 platinum records.

The first album released in Portugal was NOW 99 and released by EMI on 2 December 1999. From the Now 2 through Now 21, the compilation was always done on a rotation system among the three music companies. In addition to these volumes, the series includes six dance editions, a DVD and the tenth anniversary commemorative edition, NOW 10 ANOS, released by EMI in December 2009. On 26 April 2010, Now Mix 2010 was released, which includes dance versions of popular songs in a non-stop mix format..

The most recent editions, Now 36Various - NOW 36, was released in November 2021.

==== Spain ====
Now has also been seen in Spain under the name of Now Esto sí es música ("Now This Is Music"). The original series included six releases from 1984 to 1989. The compilation album is released as a double CD album. Later the series started over with Now Esto Es Música 1, which included songs from artists like Juanes, Enrique Iglesias, George Michael, Sheryl Crow, Tiziano Ferro, Alex Ubago, Las Ketchup and U2. Now Esto Es Música 2003 has also been released. But due to the lukewarm success, no more albums were released since 2004.

However, in late 2009, EMI Music released the album "Now Dance" in Spain, which contains all the biggest dance hits in Spain during 2009, including Lady Gaga, David Guetta featuring Kelly Rowland, The Black Eyed Peas and Katy Perry, among others.

=== North America ===
==== Canada ====
The first installment of the product line into Canada was released in 1988. The second installment of the product line was released in 1995. Beginning with the second installment of the series, repertoire was licensed from Universal, Warner and EMI. Songs from Sony and BMG was not included on any editions of the series in Canada. Since the second installment of the series, Universal, Warner and EMI have formed a joint venture together and generally take turns to release the series. From the years of 1996 to 2009 the series released an annual compilation usually in the late summer months. However, beginning with Now 15, there have been two editions each year which usually take place in early winter and late summer. Now 28 was the last release in 2017.

==== Mexico ====
Now has also been seen in Mexico, with ten releases. The track listings on the Mexican albums are only slightly different from those of the Argentine ones.

==== United States ====
The series of Now albums was brought to the United States in 1998 by Bob Mercer. The last physical album in the series was, Now That's What I Call Music! 90, which was released on May 3, 2024.

Collectively, the Now compilations sold extremely well in the U.S. Each of the first 29 volumes received at least a platinum certification, and 18 albums from the series have reached number one on the Billboard 200 albums chart, more than any individual recording artist except the Beatles. However, more recent releases have not sold as well, with Now That's What I Call Music! 77 selling only an estimated 7,500 copies in its first week, compared to the 621,000 copies Now! 7 sold in its debut week in July 2001.

The most successful album in the series to date is Now That's What I Call Music! 5, which was certified 4× Platinum by the RIAA in 2000. Since the fourth volume, Jeff Moskow was the album compiler.

Various "special edition" Now! albums were also released, such as Now Esto Es Musica! Latino, Now That's What I Call Motown, and Now That's What I Call the 1990s. Since the release of Volume 32 in 2009, albums included bonus "Now What's Next" tracks by not-yet-fully-established artists at the expense of additional hit songs. The 2020s saw the Now brand being introduced to streaming services such as Spotify.

=== Oceania ===
==== Australia ====
The Australian series trialed in 1987 as Now That's What I Call Music 1 on Vinyl and Cassette tape the second was a single disc edition titles Now 01 hot 30 and released in 2002, as a replacement for the long-running 100% Hits brand. The series is a joint venture between EMI Music Australia and Warner Music Australia.

Now 01 appeared in July of that year, followed by Now 02 in time for Christmas 2002. 2003's Now 03 came with a bonus DVD; the first standalone DVD release (Now Vision 2004) appeared the following year. Now 08 was the last of this series however a second series took over this time with seasons instead of volumes for example Now Winter 2005, Now Spring 2005. Now Summer 2014 was the last in the second series, on the third series the season was dropped and instead the year and volume is used for example Now 2014 Vol.1, Now 2019 Vol.1 was the last in the series.

===== Other notes about the series =====
In 2006 the Now Summer 2007 was the first double disc edition in the Australian series. In 1994, four albums were released, all with the title Now That's What I Call Music - 100% then Dance, Ballad, Rap or Alternate.

==== New Zealand ====
Now That's What I Call Music! has released over 60 physical albums in New Zealand since 1997. The first was released as a trial in 1985 on Vinyl and was the only release until 1992.Compiled in partnership with the country's top record companies, this compilation series stands as one of the best-selling in New Zealand music history (RIANZ), achieving multi-platinum sales. An unrelated, Now That's What I Call Music! series by Warner Bros. Records released only three albums between 1992 and 1993.

The final physical album in the main series was released on July 3, 2020. Subsequent albums have continued on streaming platforms such as Spotify.

Other non-series that has been released was Now That's What I Call Music NZ, and a holiday-themed album, Now That's What I Call Christmas, was released on November 16, 2023.

As of 2024, the latest release is Now That's What I Call Music! 63, published on July 6, 2021.

=== South America ===
==== Argentina ====
Now has been seen in Argentina, with at least nine releases. The track listings on the Argentine Now albums are only slightly different from those of the Mexican ones.

== See also ==
- Now That's What I Call Music! discography
