= 100% Hits: Best of 2003 =

Compilation album by Various
- Released: November 21, 2003
- Label: EMI

Series chronology
100% Hits: Very Best of 2002 (2002)	100% Hits: Best of 2003 (2003)	100% Hits: The Best of 2004 (2004)

100% Hits: Best of 2003 is a 2-disc compilation album released by EMI Music Australia and Warner Music Australia. The album was the #18 compilation album on the 2003 year-end charts in Australia. The album was certified platinum in Australia.

== Track listing ==
=== Disc 1 ===
1. Stacie Orrico – "Stuck" (3:42)
2. Chingy – "Right Thurr" (3:37)
3. Madonna – "American Life" (4:27)
4. The Androids – "Do It with Madonna" (3:48)
5. Amanda Perez – "Angel" (3:38)
6. Kylie Minogue – "Come into My World" (4:05)
7. Sean Paul – "Get Busy" (3:31)
8. Hilary Duff – "Why Not" (2:59)
9. Dannii Minogue – "I Begin to Wonder" (3:40)
10. Snoop Dogg featuring Pharrell and Uncle Charlie Wilson – "Beautiful" (3:21)
11. Missy Elliott featuring Ludacris – "Gossip Folks" (Fatboy Slim Radio Remix) (3:30)
12. Sophie Monk – "Get the Music On" (3:43)
13. Atomic Kitten – "Be with You" (3:35)
14. Bec Cartwright – "On the Borderline" (3:20)
15. Mis-Teeq – "Scandalous" (Stargate Radio Mix) (3:58)
16. Disco Montego – "U Talkin' to Me" (5:11)
17. The Sound Bluntz – "Billie Jean" (4:01)
18. Who Da Funk featuring Jessica Eve – "Shiny Disco Balls" (3:14)
19. Craig David – "World Filled with Love" (3:44)
20. Wayne Wonder – "No Letting Go" (3:22)
21. Liam Lynch – "United States of Whatever" (1:28)

=== Disc 2 ===
1. Silverchair – "Across the Night" (5:34)
2. Jewel – "Intuition" (3:48)
3. Alex Lloyd – "Coming Home" (3:07)
4. Michelle Branch – "Are You Happy Now?" (3:50)
5. Emmanuel Carella – "Don't Say a Word" (3:20)
6. Amiel – "Lovesong" (3:30)
7. Robbie Williams – "Come Undone" (4:38)
8. Coldplay – "Clocks" (4:11)
9. Jason Mraz – "The Remedy (I Won't Worry)" (4:13)
10. Matchbox Twenty – "Unwell" (3:49)
11. The Superjesus – "Stick Together" (4:14)
12. Hot Action Cop – "Fever for the Flava" (4:09)
13. The Music – "The People" (4:59)
14. The Dandy Warhols – "We Used to Be Friends" (3:20)
15. Jack Johnson – "The Horizon Has Been Defeated" (2:33)
16. Ben Harper – "Diamonds On the Inside" (3:40)
17. The Whitlams – "Don't Believe Anymore" (5:25)
18. David Gray – "Be Mine" (4:21)
19. Michael Bublé – "Kissing a Fool" (4:34)
