= Sumo II =

Sumo

Studio album (reissue) by The Superjesus
- Released: October 1998
- Studio: Triclops Sound Studios, Atlanta, The Metro, Sydney
- Genre: Alternative rock, post-grunge, hard rock
- Label: East West Records, Warner Music Group
- Producer: Matt Serletic

The Superjesus chronology
Sumo (1998)	Sumo (1998)	Jet Age (2000)

Sumo II is the reissue of Australian band The Superjesus' debut studio album Sumo. The album was released in October 1998, 8 months after the original and features live tracks and video clips. The album peaked at number 34 on the ARIA Charts.

The live tracks were recorded at The Metro Theatre, Sydney on 19 & 20 March 1998.

== Track listing ==
Disc 1
No.	Title	Writer(s)	Length
1.	"Down Again"	Chris Tennent; Sarah McLeod	5:07
2.	"Saturation"	Tennent; McLeod	4:07
3.	"Sandfly"	Tennent; McLeod	4:14
4.	"Now and Then"	Tennent; McLeod	4:05
5.	"Ashes"	Tennent; McLeod	3:34
6.	"I'm Stained"	Tennent; McLeod	4:45
7.	"Honeyrider"	Tennent; McLeod	4:37
8.	"Sink"	Tennent; McLeod	3:42
9.	"Dead Ended"	Tennent; McLeod	3:05
10.	"Milk"	Tennent; McLeod	5:00

Disc 2
No.	Title	Writer(s)	Length
1.	"Ashes" (live audio)	Chris Tennent; Sarah McLeod	5:13
2.	"Ground" (live audio)	Tennent; McLeod	3:38
3.	"I'm Stained" (live audio)	Tennent; McLeod	4:37
4.	"Down Again" (live audio)	Tennent; McLeod	5:17
5.	"Shut My Eyes" (live audio)	Tennent; McLeod	4:16
6.	"Saturation" (live audio)	Tennent; McLeod	4:30
7.	"Now and Then" (live audio)	Tennent; McLeod	4:22
8.	"Ashes" (live video)	Tennent; McLeod	5:13
9.	"I'm Stained" (live video)	Tennent; McLeod	4:37
10.	"Down Again" (live video)	Tennent; McLeod	5:17
11.	"Shut My Eyes" (live video)	Tennent; McLeod	4:18
12.	"Saturation" (live video)	Tennent; McLeod	4:30
13.	"Now and Then" (live video)	Tennent; McLeod	4:22

== Charts ==
Chart (1998)	Peak position
Australian Albums (ARIA)	34

== Personnel ==
- Stuart Rudd – bass
- Paul Berryman – drums
- Jeff Tomei – engineer
- Chris Tennent – guitar, composer (strings)
- Stephen Marcussen – mastered
- Greg Archilla – mixing
- Matt Serletic – producer, mixing, arranger, composer (strings)
- Sarah McLeod – vocals, guitar

== Release history ==
Country	Date	Format	Label	Catalogue
Australia	October 1998	2XCD	EastWest Records/Warner Music Australia	3984252612
