= Rock Music (album) =

Studio album by The Superjesus
- Released: May 2003
- Genre: Rock
- Label: EastWest Records, Warner Music Group

The Superjesus chronology
Jet Age (2000)	Rock Music (2003)	Love and Violence (2016)

Singles from Rock Music
- 1. "Stick Together" Released: April 2003; 2. "Over and Out" Released: July 2003; 3. "So Lonely" Released: 9 February 2004

Rock Music is the third studio album by Australian band The Superjesus. The album was released in May 2003 and peaked at number 14.

== Background ==
Rock Music was difficult for the band to make, taking a year and a half to finish. Bass player Stuart Rudd outlined the difficulties in making the album in an interview with Inpress magazine in June 2003. "This album is a result of a year and a half prior," Stuart Rudd begins to explain. "The ups and downs definitely… it all came to a peak when we were in London. We had forty or fifty songs written and we could not come to agree on a direction to go. Then with the departure of another guitarist (Tim Henwood) we really had to pick ourselves up off the canvas again. We realised that the songs we had been writing weren’t the ones that we wanted to do, because we were suddenly able to move as one in the direction we wanted to go. It was like a huge weight off our shoulders."

Tim Henwood left the band to form The Androids who had a top ten hit in Australia with the song "Do It with Madonna".

== Track listing ==
No.	Title	Writer(s)	Length
1.	"Shudder"		4:08
2.	"Stick Together"		4:16
3.	"Let It Go"		3:22
4.	"These Dreams"		3:28
5.	"Over and Out"		4:14
6.	"Bodies for Breakin'"		3:26
7.	"Manic"		3:56
8.	"Medication"		2:58
9.	"Closer"		3:01
10.	"So Lonely"	Sarah McLeod; Tim Henwood; Chris Tennent	3:55

2004 re-release Collectibles and Rarities
No.	Title	Writer(s)	Length
1.	"Down Again" (live)	Sarah McLeod; Chris Tennent	5:28
2.	"Gravity"	McLeod; Tim Henwood	4:00
3.	"Second Sun" (remix)		3:56
4.	"Saturation"		4:06
5.	"Sandfly" (live)		9:49
6.	"Shut My Eyes"		3:27
7.	"Birdman"		4:00
8.	"Receive It"		4:00
9.	"Something in the Air"		5:07
10.	"Blisterment"		3:04
11.	"Everybody Calls Me Lonely"		3:31
12.	"Letter to the Peace Corp"		3:14

== Charts ==
Chart performance for Rock Music
Chart (2003)	Peak position
Australian Albums (ARIA)	14

== Release history ==
Release history and formats for Rock Music
Country	Date	Format	Label	Catalogue
Australia	May 2003	CD	EastWest/Warner Music Group	2564600082
Australia	16 February 2004 (re-release)	2×CD	EastWest/Warner Music Group	9325583023538
