= Stick Together =

Stick Together may refer to the following songs:

- "Stick Together (The Superjesus song)", a 2003 single by The Superjesus from Rock Music
- "Stick Together (Anthony Jasmin song)", a 2014 single by Anthony Jasmin from an EP of the same name
