= 100% Hits: The Best of 2004 =

Compilation album by Various
- Released: November 15, 2004
- Recorded: 2004
- Genre: Pop
- Label: EMI

Series chronology
100% Hits: Best of 2003 (2003)	100% Hits: The Best of 2004 (2004)	100% Hits: The Best of 2005 (2005)

100% Hits: The Best of 2004 is a 2-disc compilation album released by EMI Music Australia and Warner Music Australia. The album was certified gold in Australia.

== Track listing ==
=== Disc 1 ===
1. Jamelia – "Superstar" (3:35)
2. Starsailor – "Four to the Floor" (Thin White Duke Mix) (4:36)
3. Kelis – "Milkshake" (3:07)
4. Freestylers – "Push Up" (3:57)
5. Kevin Lyttle – "Turn Me On" (3:22)
6. Fabolous featuring Tamia – "Into You" (4:56)
7. Scribe – "Stand Up" (4:16)
8. Kylie Minogue – "Red Blooded Woman" (4:21)
9. N.E.R.D – "She Wants to Move" (3:35)
10. Boogie Pimps – "Somebody to Love" (Saltshaker Remix) (3:00)
11. Chingy featuring J-Weav – "One Call Away" (4:21)
12. Missy Elliott – "Pass That Dutch" (3:43)
13. Jewel – "Stand" (3:15)
14. Simple Plan – "Perfect" (4:39)
15. LMC vs. U2 – "Take Me to the Clouds Above" (2:51)
16. Stellar Project featuring Brandi Emma – "Get Up Stand Up" (2:56)
17. Mr. Timothy featuring Inaya Day – "I Am Tha 1" (3:30)
18. Hilary Duff – "Come Clean" (3:36)
19. Jentina – "Bad Ass Strippa" (2:51)
20. J-Wess featuring Lolly, Kulaia and MC Digga – "What Chu Want"
21. Solitaire – "I Like Love (I Love Love)" (3:48)

=== Disc 2 ===
1. Finn Brothers – "Won't Give In" (4:18)
2. Matchbox Twenty – "All I Need" (3:40)
3. Michael Bublé – "Sway" (Junkie XL Mix) (3:09)
4. Missy Higgins – "Greed for Your Love" (4:08)
5. Joss Stone – "Super Duper Love" (4:20)
6. Norah Jones – "Sunrise" (3:20)
7. Kasey Chambers – "Like a River" (3:49)
8. Jet – "Look What You've Done" (3:52)
9. Little Birdy – "This Is a Love Song" (2:31)
10. The Streets – "Fit but You Know It" (4:13)
11. The Dissociatives – "Somewhere Down the Barrel" (4:20)
12. Eskimo Joe – "From the Sea" (3:21)
13. Fountains of Wayne – "Stacy's Mom" (3:18)
14. Steriogram – "Walkie Talkie Man" (2:15)
15. Yellowcard – "Ocean Avenue" (3:20)
16. The Vines – "Ride" (2:38)
17. John Butler Trio – "Zebra" (3:57)
18. The Cat Empire – "Days Like These" (3:50)
19. k.d. lang – "Helpless" (4:15)
20. The Corrs – "Summer Sunshine" (2:51)
21. Alex Lloyd – "Beautiful" (3:22)
22. Michelle Branch – "Breathe" (3:22)
