= So Lonely (The Superjesus song) =

Single by The Superjesus

from the album Rock Music
- Released: 9 February 2004
- Genre: Rock music
- Label: EastWest Records, Warner Music Australia
- Songwriter(s): Paul Berryman; Tim Henwood; Sarah McLeod; Stuart Rudd; Chris Tennent

The Superjesus singles chronology
"Over and Out" (2003)	"So Lonely" (2004)	"The Setting Sun" (2015)

"So Lonely" is a rock song performed by Australian band The Superjesus. The song was released in February 2004 as the third and final single from the band's third studio album, Rock Music (2003). The song peaked at number 45 on the Australian ARIA Singles Chart. It was the band's final release before they split with Warner Music Australia and pursued solo careers in June 2004.

== Reception ==
Ronan Kellaghan, The ARIA Report's "Chartifacts!" writer, described "So Lonely" as, "an acoustic track lacking the edgy guitar of previous Superjesus material."

== Track listing ==
CD Single (5046717072)

1. "So Lonely" (Paul Berryman, Tim Henwood, Sarah McLeod, Stuart Rudd, Chris Tennent)
2. "Life Like Before" (McLeod, Berryman, Rudd, Henwood)
3. "Deeper Water" (McLeod, Berryman, Rudd, Henwood)

== Charts ==
Chart (2004)	Peak Position
Australia (ARIA)	45
