= 100% Hits: The Best of 2001 + Summer Hits =

Compilation album by Various
- Released: November 26, 2001
- Label: EMI

Series chronology
100% Hits: The Best of 2000 (2000)	100% Hits: The Best of 2001 + Summer Hits (2001)	100% Hits: Very Best of 2002 (2002)

100% Hits: The Best of 2001 + Summer Hits is a 2001 compilation album released by EMI Music Australia and Warner Music Australia. The album was the #13 compilation album on the 2002 year-end charts in Australia. The album was certified platinum in Australia.

== Track listing ==
=== Disc 1 ===
1. Robbie Williams and Kylie Minogue – "Kids" (4:46)
2. NSYNC – "Pop" (4:00)
3. Da Muttz – "Wassuup!" (3:37)
4. Scandal'us – "Me, Myself & I" (3:09)
5. Janet Jackson – "All for You" (4:25)
6. Daft Punk – "One More Time" (5:24)
7. Uncle Kracker – "Follow Me" (3:37)
8. Madison Avenue – "Reminiscing" (3:32)
9. Sugar Ray – "When It's Over" (3:38)
10. Emma Bunton – "What Took You So Long?" (4:01)
11. Kylie Minogue – "Your Disco Needs You" (3:35)
12. Geri Halliwell – "It's Raining Men" (4:17)
13. Sugababes – "Overload" (4:39)
14. Atomic Kitten – "Whole Again" (3:06)
15. Joe featuring Mystikal – "Stutter" (3:35)
16. Liberty City – "I Met Her In Miami" (3:58)
17. R.E.M. – "Imitation of Life" (3:57)
18. The Superjesus – "Gravity" (4:01)
19. Lash – "Take Me Away" (3:36)

=== Disc 2 ===
1. The Ones – "Flawless" (3:10)
2. Tall Paul vs. INXS – "Precious Heart" (3:36)
3. Blue – "Too Close" (3:48)
4. Paul Mac featuring Peta Morris – "Just the Thing" (3:55)
5. Bardot – "I Need Somebody" (3:29)
6. Sam La More – "Takin' Hold" (3:28)
7. Planet Funk – "Chase the Sun" (3:44)
8. Jive Jones – "Me, Myself & I" (3:30)
9. Gorillaz – "19-2000" (3:29)
10. Dante Thomas featuring Pras – "Miss California" (3:28)
11. Alex Lloyd – "Amazing" (3:24)
12. Robbie Williams – "Better Man" (3:22)
13. Victoria Beckham – "Not Such an Innocent Girl" (3:20)
14. Anuj – "What You Wanna Do" (2:52)
15. Fragma – "Toca's Miracle" (3:52)
16. Nivea – "Don't Mess with the Radio" (3:56)
17. Aaliyah – "Try Again" (4:45)
18. DJ Pied Piper and the Masters of Ceremonies – "Do You Really Like It?" (3:24)
19. Gwyneth Paltrow – "Bette Davis Eyes" (3:29)
20. Spice Girls – "Holler" (4:15)
21. The Corrs – "Give Me a Reason" (3:12)
