= Welcome to Japan =

Welcome to Japan may refer to:

- Welcome to Japan, a video album for The Music's 2004 album Welcome to the North
- "Welcome to Japan", a song by The Strokes from their 2013 album Comedown Machine
- Welcome to Japan, Ms. Elf!, Japanese light novel series
- Welcome to Japan, Mr. Bond, a one-hour colour television programme made to promote the 1967 film You Only Live Twice
