= Rock music (disambiguation) =

Rock music is a form of popular music that normally includes the electric guitar, bass guitar and drums.

Rock music may also refer to:

- Rock Music (album), a 2003 album by the Superjesus
- "Rock Music", a song by Pixies on the 1990 album Bossanova
- "Rock Music", a song by Jefferson Starship on the 1979 album Freedom at Point Zero
- Rock Music: A Tribute to Weezer, a 2002 album by various artists
- "Rock Music" (song), a 2026 song by Charli XCX

== See also ==
- Rock (disambiguation)
