= Broken Arrow =

Broken Arrow or Broken Arrows may refer to:

== Military ==
- Broken Arrow (nuclear), an accidental nuclear event involving nuclear weapons, warheads, or components which does not create the risk of nuclear war
- "Broken Arrow", a code phrase notably used during the 1965 Battle of Ia Drang to indicate an American combat unit was in danger of being overrun

== Places ==
- "Broken Arrow" (Korea), nickname for Haktang-ni, Republic of Korea, site of a battle during the Korean War
- Broken Arrow, Oklahoma, United States
- Broken Arrow Ranch, summer camp in Kansas
- Broken Arrow Ranch, former home of singer Neil Young

== Arts, entertainment, and media ==
=== Films ===
- Broken Arrow (1950 film), a Golden Globe-winning western film starring James Stewart
- Broken Arrow (1996 film), an action film starring John Travolta, Christian Slater and directed by John Woo

=== Music ===
- Broken Arrow, a Canadian band featuring Paul Humphrey
- Broken Arrow (band), a band from Los Angeles, California
- Broken Arrow (album), a 1996 album by Neil Young and Crazy Horse
- Broken Arrow 1995 album by Charlie Mars Band, Dualtone Music

==== Songs ====
- "Broken Arrow" (Buffalo Springfield song), 1967
- "Broken Arrow" (Pixie Lott song), 2010
- "Broken Arrow" (Robbie Robertson song), 1987, covered by Rod Stewart and Ruin/Renewal
- "Broken Arrow", a 1959 single by Chuck Berry from the album Rockin' at the Hops
- "Broken Arrows" (song), a 2015 song by Avicii
- "Broken Arrows", a song by Daughtry from their 2013 album Baptized
- "Aka... Broken Arrow", by Noel Gallagher's High Flying Birds from their eponymous album

=== Other arts, entertainment, and media ===
- Broken Arrow (TV series), an ABC television series, 1956–1960
- "Broken Arrow" (Arrow), an episode of Arrow
- Broken Arrow (video game), a 2025 video game published by Slitherine Software

== Other uses ==
- Broken Arrow Skyrace, a trail running event in California
