= Enough to Know =

2001 single by the Superjesus

Single by the Superjesus

from the album Jet Age
- B-side: "Birdman"; "What You Don't Know"; "Just Enough Standing"
- Released: 20 August 2001
- Studio: Festival (Sydney, Australia)
- Label: EastWest
- Songwriters: Sarah McLeod; Tim Henwood
- Producer: Ed Buller

The Superjesus singles chronology
| "Secret Agent Man" (2001) | "Enough to Know" (2001) | "Second Sun" (2002) |

"Enough to Know" is a song by Australian band the Superjesus. It was released in August 2001 as the third single from the band's second studio album, Jet Age (2000). The song peaked at number 42 on the Australian ARIA Singles Chart.

== Track listing ==
CD single

1. "Enough to Know"
2. "Birdman"
3. "What You Don't Know"
4. "Just Enough Standing"

== Charts ==
| Chart (2001) | Peak position |
|---|---|
| Australia (ARIA) | 42 |
