= Freedom Fighters (song) =

Single by The Music

from the album Welcome to the North
- Released: 6 September 2004
- Recorded: 2003–2004
- Genre: Alternative rock
- Length: 3:44
- Label: Virgin
- Songwriter(s): The Music
- Producer(s): Brendan O'Brien

The Music singles chronology
"The Truth Is No Words" (2003)	"Freedom Fighters" (2004)	"Breakin'" (2004)

"Freedom Fighters" is a song from The Music's second album, Welcome to the North. It was also the first single from that album, released in Japan in late August 2004 as an EP and in the UK and elsewhere in Europe as a single in early September 2004. It peaked at the #15 position in the British charts.

== Track listing ==
=== In Japan ===
- EP released 25 August 2004 by Toshiba-EMI
- CD VJCP-61092
1. "Freedom Fighters"
2. "Getaway" (slow version)
3. "So Low"
4. "Freedom Fighters" (John Digweed and Nick Muir remix)

=== In the UK ===
- Single released 6 September 2004 by Virgin Records
- CD1 VSCDT1883
1. "Freedom Fighters"
2. "Come What May"
- CD2 VSCDX1883
1. "Freedom Fighters"
2. "So Low"
3. "The People" (Nick McCabe remix)
4. "Freedom Fighters" (Video)
- 7" VS1883
1. "Freedom Fighters"
2. "Getaway" (slow version)
