= Strength in Numbers =

Strength in Numbers may refer to:

== Albums ==
- Strength in Numbers (24-7 Spyz album), 1992
- Strength in Numbers (38 Special album), 1986
- Strength in Numbers (Calla album), 2007
- Strength in Numbers (The Haunted album), 2017
- Strength in Numbers (The Music album), 2008
- Strength in Numbers (Tyketto album), 1994

== Songs ==
- "Strength in Numbers" (song), by The Music from the above album
- "Strength in Numbers", a song by In Fear and Faith from their album Your World on Fire
- "Strength in Numbers", a song by Luba from her album Between the Earth & Sky
- "Strength in Numbers", a song by Times of Grace from their album The Hymn of a Broken Man

== Other uses ==
- Strength in Numbers (band), a bluegrass supergroup
- Strength in Numbers, a book and a website by G. Elliott Morris
