= Secret Agent Man (The Superjesus song) =

2001 single by The Superjesus

Single by The Superjesus

from the album Jet Age
- Released: February 2001
- Recorded: Festival Studios, Sydney
- Genre: Rock music, Pop rock
- Label: EastWest Records, Warner Music Australia
- Songwriter(s): Sarah McLeod; Tim Henwood
- Producer(s): Ed Buller

The Superjesus singles chronology
"Gravity" (2000)	"Secret Agent Man" (2001)	"Enough to Know" (2001)

"Secret Agent Man" is a rock song performed by Australian band The Superjesus. The song was released in February 2001 as the second single from the band's second studio album, Jet Age (2000). The song peaked at number 43 on the Australian ARIA Singles Chart.

== Track listing ==
CD Single (8573867482)

1. "Secret Agent Man" (Radio edit)
2. "Last Thing You're Looking For"
3. "Letter to The Peace Corp"
4. "Secret Agent Man" (Album version)

== Charts ==
Chart (2001)	Peak Position
Australia (ARIA)	43
