= Now and Then (The Superjesus song) =

1998 single by the Superjesus

Single by the Superjesus

from the album Sumo
- B-side: "Spike the Guns"
- Released: March 1998
- Recorded: Triclops Sound (Atlanta, Georgia)
- Length: 4:05
- Label: EastWest
- Songwriters: Sarah McLeod; Chris Tennent
- Producer: Matt Serletic

The Superjesus singles chronology
"Saturation" (1997)	"Now and Then" (1998)	"Ashes" (1998)

"Now and Then" is a song by Australian rock band the Superjesus. It was released in March 1998 as the third single from their debut studio album, Sumo (1998). The song peaked at number 40 on the Australian ARIA Singles Chart. In January 1999, the song was ranked number 83 on the Triple J Hottest 100 of 1998.

== Track listing ==
CD single

1. "Now and Then" – 4:05
2. "Down Again" (live from Triple J rooftop) – 5:20
3. "Spike the Guns" (live From The Falls Festival, Lorne) – 3:06
4. "Saturation" (demo) – 3:56

== Charts ==
Chart (1998)	Peak position
Australia (ARIA)	40
