= Here She Comes (disambiguation) =

"Here She Comes" is a song by Bonnie Tyler from the 1984 version of Metropolis

Here She Comes may also refer to:

- "Here She Comes" (The Androids song)
- "Here She Comes", a song by the Beach Boys from the album Carl and the Passions – "So Tough"
- "Here She Comes", a song by Dierks Bentley from the album Feel That Fire
