= Sumo (album) =

Studio album by The Superjesus
- Released: 1 February 1998
- Recorded: April 1997
- Studio: Triclops Sound Studios, Atlanta
- Genre: Alternative rock; post-grunge; hard rock
- Length: 46:25
- Label: EastWest/Warner
- Producer: Matt Serletic

The Superjesus chronology
Eight Step Rail (1996)	Sumo (1998)	Sumo II (1998)

Singles from Sumo
- 1. "Down Again" Released: 25 August 1997; 2. "Saturation" Released: November 1997; 3. "Now and Then" Released: March 1998; 4. "Ashes" Released: June 1998

Sumo is the debut studio album by Australian alternative rock band the Superjesus, which was issued on 1 February 1998. It was produced and mixed by Matt Serletic for East West Records/Warner Music Australia and peaked at number 2 on the ARIA Albums Chart. The album was re-issued in October 1998 as Sumo II, with an additional disc of live performances. At the 1998 ARIA Music Awards Sumo won the inaugural Best Rock Album category. It was also nominated for Best Group, Breakthrough Artist – Album and Chris Tennent and William Tennent were nominated for Best Cover Art.

To celebrate 20 years since its release, Sumo was re-released in August 2018, with bonus tracks and on vinyl for the first time. The Superjesus toured the album during the second half of 2018.

== Background and recording ==
Sumo was recorded by the Superjesus in Atlanta, Georgia from April 1997. Their debut five-track extended play, Eight Step Rail, was released in August 1996 via Aloha Records, two of its tracks are "Shut My Eyes" and "I'm Stained". After touring with visiting British band, Bush in late 1996 and performing at the 1997 Big Day Out Festival, the Superjesus began work on the album. In an August 1997 interview with The Sydney Morning Herald, guitarist Chris Tennent stated, "We did the Bush tour and the Big Day Out. Then we took time out to get some songs together before recording the album." In 2018, vocalist Sarah McLeod reflected, "we flew to Atlanta, Georgia to record our first full length record for our new label Warner. We chose Triclops Studios because that's where the Smashing Pumpkins recorded our favourite record, Siamese Dream. Once it was in the can, we came back to Australia and were asked to play at the [1997] ARIAs."

Both "I'm Stained" and "Shut My Eyes" were re-recorded for Sumo, with "Shut My Eyes" as a hidden track. McLeod and Tennent were dating prior to recording the album, Tennent was "writing songs which he recorded, complete with all the guitar parts, onto a tape" and McLeod "spent a considerable time familiarising herself with the songs. She was still writing lyrics on the plane bound for Atlanta." By the time it was released McLeod and Tennent's personal relationship was over however they continued in the band. Two singles appeared ahead of the album, "Down Again" (August 1997) and "Saturation" (November). Its third single, "Now and Then" was issued in March 1998. The fourth single, "Ashes", followed in September. The group provided a track-by-track description of the album for The iZine in February 1998. The Sumo Tour of Australia, with over 40 dates, occurred from mid-February to late April. They started the tour with an appearance on national youth radio Triple J's program Live at the Wireless in Sydney, where they recorded tracks live-in-the-studio. Sumo was released in the United States in July 1998 and the Superjesus relocated to Los Angeles to promote it. Upon return to Australia Tennent left the Superjesus and was replaced on guitar by Tim Henwood in July 1999.

== Reception ==
Professional ratings
Review scores
Source	Rating
AllMusic	3/5 stars

Jonathan Lewis from AllMusic wrote: "Sumo was full of guitar-driven alternative radio-friendly songs." adding "Opening with the Helmet-style riffing of the excellent "Down Again", the Superjesus show that guitar rock with McLeod's vocals soaring over the top is definitely their strength. It is also their weakness, with Sumo containing too little variation in style." Lewis said "While the first half of Sumo shows plenty of promise, the second half loses its intensity."

== Track listing ==
All tracks are written by Chris Tennent, Sarah McLeod

Sumo (1998 version)
No.	Title	Length
1.	"Down Again"	5:07
2.	"Saturation"	4:07
3.	"Sandfly"	4:14
4.	"Now and Then"	4:05
5.	"Ashes"	3:34
6.	"I'm Stained"	4:45
7.	"Honeyrider"	4:37
8.	"Sink"	3:42
9.	"Dead Ended"	3:05
10.	"Milk" (includes hidden track "Shut My Eyes")	8:44
Total length:		46:25

2018 20th Anniversary Edition

No.	Title	Writer(s)	Length
1.	"Down Again"	Chris Tennent; Sarah McLeod	5:07
2.	"Saturation"	Tennent; McLeod	4:04
3.	"Sandfly"	Tennent; McLeod	4:17
4.	"Now and Then"	Tennent; McLeod	4:05
5.	"Ashes"	Tennent; McLeod	3:36
6.	"I'm Stained"	Tennent; McLeod	4:45
7.	"Shut My Eyes"	Tennent; McLeod	4:39
8.	"Honeyrider"	Tennent; McLeod	4:38
9.	"Sink"	Tennent; McLeod	3:43
10.	"Dead Ended"	Tennent; McLeod	3:05
11.	"Blisterment" (B-side to "Down Again")	Tennent; McLeod	3:03
12.	"Milk"	Tennent; McLeod	4:23
13.	"Strips of You" (originally on the EP Eight Step Rail)	Tennent; McLeod	4:54
14.	"Confide in Me" (previously unreleased recording from 1996)	Steve Anderson; Dave Seaman; Owain Barton	3:54
15.	"Honeyrider" (Triple J Live at the Wireless 1997)	Tennent; McLeod	4:45
16.	"I'm Stained" (Triple J Live at the Wireless 1997)	Tennent; McLeod	4:38
17.	"Shut My Eyes" (Triple J Live at the Wireless 1997)	Tennent; McLeod	3:34
18.	"Saturation" (Triple J Live at the Wireless 1997)	Tennent; McLeod	4:28

== Personnel ==
Credits adapted from liner notes:

The Superjesus

- Paul Berryman – drums
- Sarah McLeod – vocals, guitar
- Stuart Rudd – bass guitar
- Chris Tennent – guitar, composer (strings)

Additional personnel

- Greg Archilla – mixing engineer
- Sophie Howarth – photography
- Stephen Marcussen – mastering engineer
- Brian Parker – assistant audio engineer
- Matt Serletic – record producer, mixing engineer, arranger, composer (strings)
- Chris Tennent, William Tennent – cover art
- Jeff Tomei – audio engineer

== Charts ==
=== Weekly charts ===
Weekly chart performance for Sumo
Chart (1998)	Peak position
Australian Albums (ARIA)	2

=== Year-end charts ===
Year-end chart performance for Sumo
Chart (1998)	Rank
Australian Albums (ARIA)	37

== Certifications ==
Certifications for Sumo
Region	Certification	Certified units/sales
Australia (ARIA)	Platinum	70,000^{^}
^{^} Shipments figures based on certification alone.

== Release history ==
Release history and formats for Sumo
Country	Date	Format	Label	Catalogue
Australia	1 February 1998	CD	East West Records/Warner Music Australia	3984204522
Australia	17 August 2018	LP	Warner Music Group	5419700293
Australia	17 August 2018	CD	Warner Music Group	5419700727
