= Breakin' (song) =

Single by the Music

from the album Welcome to the North
- Released: 10 January 2005
- Genre: Alternative rock
- Length: 3:58
- Label: Virgin Records
- Songwriter: The Music
- Producer: Brendan O'Brien

The Music singles chronology
"'Freedom Fighters'" (2004)	"Breakin'" (2005)	"'Strength in Numbers'" (2008)

"Breakin'" is a song by English rock band the Music, from their second studio album, Welcome to the North. It was the second single from that album, released in the UK and elsewhere in Europe as a single in early January 2005 and in Japan in early March 2005 as an EP. It peaked at number 20 on both the UK Singles Chart and on Billboard's Alternative Songs chart.

== Track listings ==
=== In the UK ===
- Single released 10 January 2005 by Virgin Records
- CD1 VSCDT1894
1. "Breakin'"
2. "Middle of Nowhere" (demo)
- CD2 VSCDX1894
1. "Breakin'"
2. "Bleed From Within" (Live at Liverpool Academy)
3. "Bleed From Within" (Thin White Duke mix)
- 7" VS1894
1. "Breakin'"
2. "Freedom Fighters" (Jo Whiley "Live Lounge" Session version)

=== In Japan ===
- EP released 9 March 2005 by Toshiba-EMI
- CD VJCP-61102
1. "Breakin'"
2. "The People" (Nick McCabe remix)
3. "Welcome to the North" (live)
4. "The People" (live)
5. "Freedom Fighters" (live)
6. "Bleed From Within" (live)
7. "Breakin'" (video)

=== In Australia ===
- EP released by EMI
- CD 7243 8 70592 2 1
1. "Breakin'"
2. "Middle of Nowhere" (Demo)
3. "Freedom Fighters" (John Digweed & Nick Muir Remix)
4. "Bleed From Within" (Live at Liverpool Academy)
5. "The People" (Nick McCabe Remix)

== In other media ==
The song was featured in "Kanes and Abel's", an episode of the American television series Veronica Mars.

== Charts ==
=== Weekly charts ===
Weekly chart performance for "Breakin'"
Chart (2005)	Peak position
Australia (ARIA)	63
Scotland Singles (OCC)	18
UK Singles (OCC)	20
US Alternative Airplay (Billboard)	20

=== Year-end charts ===
Year-end chart performance for "Breakin'"
Chart (2005)	Position
US Modern Rock Tracks (Billboard)	83
