= 100% Hits: The Best of 2000 =

Compilation album by Various
- Released: December 2000
- Label: EMI

Series chronology
100% Hits: The Best of 1999 (1999)	100% Hits: The Best of 2000 (2000)	100% Hits: The Best of 2001 + Summer Hits (2001)

100% Hits: The Best of 2000 is a 2000 compilation album released by EMI Music Australia and Warner Music Australia. The album was the #9 compilation album on the 2001 year-end charts in Australia. The album was certified platinum in Australia.

== Track listing ==
=== Disc 1 ===
1. Savage Garden – "Crash and Burn" (4:42)
2. The Corrs – "Breathless" (3:28)
3. Bardot – "These Days" (3:15)
4. Melanie C – "I Turn to You" (4:13)
5. Robbie Williams – "Rock DJ" (4:18)
6. Morcheeba – "Rome Wasn't Built in a Day" (3:35)
7. Vitamin C – "Graduation (Friends Forever)" (4:25)
8. Taxiride – "Everywhere You Go" (3:37)
9. The Whitlams – "Blow Up the Pokies" (3:25)
10. Filter – "Take a Picture" (4:24)
11. Area-7 – "Start Making Sense" (3:32)
12. Billie Piper – "Something Deep Inside" (3:23)
13. Aleesha Rome – "Search My Heaven" (3:54)
14. Alice Deejay – "Better Off Alone" (3:37)
15. Fragma – "Toca's Miracle" (3:24)
16. Tina Cousins – "Pray" (3:56)
17. Steps – "Say You'll Be Mine" (3:34)
18. Madasun – "Don't You Worry" (4:03)
19. Backstreet Boys – "Show Me the Meaning of Being Lonely" (3:56)
20. Spiller – "Groovejet (If This Ain't Love)" (3:52)

=== Disc 2 ===
1. Killing Heidi – "Mascara" (4:51)
2. Madison Avenue – "Don't Call Me Baby" (3:48)
3. Groove Armada – "I See You Baby" (4:42)
4. Kelis – "Caught Out There" (4:11)
5. Kaylan – "Shake It" (3:52)
6. NSYNC – "Bye Bye Bye" (3:21)
7. Melanie B – "Tell Me" (3:54)
8. Britney Spears – "Oops!... I Did It Again" (3:53)
9. M2M – "Don't Say You Love Me" (3:45)
10. ATB – "Don't Stop!" (2:45)
11. William Orbit – "Adagio for Strings" (3:42)
12. Groove Terminator – "One More Time (The Sunshine Song)" (3:24)
13. Vengaboys – "Shalala Lala" (3:36)
14. Cher – "Dov'è l'amore" (3:46)
15. Third Eye Blind – "Never Let You Go" (3:58)
16. Coldplay – "Yellow" (4:31)
17. Richard Ashcroft – "C'mon People (We're Making It Now)" (5:03)
18. Faith Hill – "Breathe" (4:09)
19. Joe – "I Wanna Know" (5:16)
