= Beauty Was a Tiger =

Studio album by Sarah McLeod
- Released: September 2005
- Genres: Alternative Rock, rock
- Length: 49:29
- Label: Festival Mushroom Records
- Producers: Matt Lovell, Sarah McLeod, Peters & Peters

Sarah McLeod chronology
Beauty Was a Tiger (2005)	Live & Acoustic (2006)

Singles from Beauty Was a Tiger
- 1. "Let's Get Together" Released: May 2005; 2. "Private School Kid" Released: July 2005; 3. "All But Gone" Released: 2005/06; 4. "He Doesn't Love You" Released: 2006

Beauty Was a Tiger is the debut solo album by Australian singer Sarah McLeod. It was released in September 2005 by Festival Mushroom Records and peaked at number 31 on the ARIA Charts.

== Background and release ==
From 1994 to 2004, McLeod was the lead singer of rock group The Superjesus. The group released three top twenty studio albums and won two ARIA Awards. On 18 April 2005, it was announced McLeod had signed with Festival Mushroom Records to release her debut solo studio album. The deal reunited McLeod with Festival Mushroom Records managing director Michael Parisi who had signed The Superjesus to Warner Music Australia a decade earlier when he was A&R Director. Parisi said "She has made a classy rock album and, above all else, there aren't many ladies of rock left in this world, let alone Australia. We're all chomping at the bit to get this album out there."

The album was released in September 2005 and was produced by McLeod, with help from Matt Lovell and Peters & Peters.

== Reception ==
Erik Jensen from The Sydney Morning Herald said "it's an album that veers between Australian pub fare and neo-Gothic rock'n'roll, like mixing Dallas Crane with Brisbane fem-rockers Gazoonga Attack. McLeod's voice is strong and raw and makes "Private School Kid" the album standout."

== Track listing ==
(022132)
No.	Title	Writer(s)	Length
1.	"Let's Get Together"	Sarah McLeod and Chris Peters	3:24
2.	"Never Enough"	Sarah McLeod	3:25
3.	"Private School Kid" (featuring Chris Cheney)	Sarah McLeod	3:27
4.	"Loveless"	Sarah McLeod	4:00
5.	"All But Gone"	Sarah McLeod	4:22
6.	"Back To Earth"	Sarah McLeod	4:44
7.	"Ava"	Sarah McLeod	3:27
8.	"Hit It Baby"	Sarah McLeod, Thomas Evans, and Jacob Malmo	3:35
9.	"Gutter Queen"	Sarah McLeod	3:09
10.	"Ashtray Sunrise"	Sarah McLeod and Chris Peters	3:16
11.	"The Sinners and the Saints"	Sarah McLeod, Thomas Evans, and Jacob Malmo.	4:26
12.	"He Doesn't Love You"	Sarah McLeod, Thomas Evans, and Jacob Malmo	3:25
13.	"Stand and Deliver"	Sarah McLeod	4:49

== Charts ==
Chart (2005)	Peak position
Australian Albums (ARIA)	31
