= The People (EP) =

EP by The Music
- Released: 29 April 2002
- Recorded: 2002
- Genre: Britpop
- Length: 4:59
- Label: Hut
- Producer: Jim Abbiss

The People is the third EP by British band The Music, and the first single on Hut Records to be taken from their debut album. Videos were produced for the title track and "Let Love Be the Healer".

== Track listing ==
1. "The People" – 4:59
2. "Let Love Be the Healer" – 3:23
3. "Life" – 4:08
4. "Jag Tune" – 4:31

== Personnel ==
The Music

- Robert Harvey – vocals
- Adam Nutter – guitars
- Phil Jordan – drums
- Stuart Coleman – bass

Produced and mixed by Jim Abbiss.

== Charts ==
Chart performance for "The Truth Is No Words / The People"
Chart (2003)	Peak position
Australia (ARIA)	77
