= 100% Hits: The Best of 2005 =

Compilation album by Various
- Released: November 14, 2005
- Label: EMI

Series chronology
| 100% Hits: The Best of 2004 (2004) | 100% Hits: The Best of 2005 (2005) | 100% Hits: The Best of 2006 (2006) |

100% Hits: The Best of 2005 is a 2-disc compilation album released by EMI Music Australia and Warner Music Australia. The album was the #14 compilation album on the year-end charts in Australia for the year 2005 (see 2005 in music). It has also been certified platinum in Australia for selling over 70,000 units.

== Track listing ==
=== Disc 1 ===
1. Gorillaz featuring De La Soul – "Feel Good Inc." (3:43)
2. Crazy Frog – "Axel F" (2:51)
3. Rob Thomas – "Lonely No More" (3:46)
4. Missy Higgins – "The Special Two" (4:24)
5. James Blunt – "You're Beautiful" (3:21)
6. Daniel Powter – "Bad Day" (3:52)
7. Coldplay – "Speed of Sound" (4:49)
8. Kylie Minogue – "I Believe in You" (3:19)
9. Moustache featuring Melinda Jackson – "Everywhere" (3:22)
10. Midnight Star – "Midas Touch" (Starskee Radio Edit) (3:29)
11. Tina Cousins – "Wonderful Life" (3:50)
12. Paris Avenue featuring Robin One – "I Want You" (3:26)
13. Live Element – "Something About You" (3:18)
14. Simple Plan – "Welcome to My Life" (3:24)
15. Thirsty Merc – "Someday, Someday" (3:40)
16. Joel Turner and The Modern Day Poets – "These Kids" (3:59)
17. P-Money featuring Scribe – "Stop the Music" (3:14)
18. Max Graham vs. Yes – "Owner of a Lonely Heart" (2:40)
19. Inaya Day – "Nasty Girl" (Ivan Gough Radio Edit) (3:13)
20. Eric Prydz – "Call on Me" (2:47)
21. Uniting Nations – "Out of Touch" (Love You So Much Radio Mix) (3:30)
22. Cabin Crew – "Star2Fall" (2:47)

=== Disc 2 ===
1. The Wrights – "Evie (Part 1)" (3:56)
2. Ben Lee – "Catch My Disease" (4:14)
3. Stereophonics – "Dakota" (4:57)
4. Evermore – "It's Too Late" (3:57)
5. Kasey Chambers – "Pony" (4:04)
6. Jimmy Barnes with Dallas Crane – "Sit on My Knee" (2:44)
7. Joss Stone – "You Had Me" (3:36)
8. End of Fashion – "O Yeah" (3:00)
9. Kisschasy – "Do-Do's & Whoa-Oh's" (3:30)
10. Caesars – "Jerk It Out" (3:17)
11. The Cat Empire – "Sly" (3:46)
12. Fast Crew – "I Got" (3:54)
13. Audio Bullys featuring Nancy Sinatra – "Shot You Down" (2:56)
14. Junior Jack – "Stupidisco" (3:39)
15. Dancing DJs vs. Roxette – "Fading Like a Flower" (3:03)
16. Armand Van Helden – "Into Your Eyes" (2:50)
17. A-Studio featuring Polina – "S.O.S" (3:01)
18. Tom Novy featuring Michael Marshall – "Your Body" (3:31)
19. The Chemical Brothers – "Galvanize" (4:28)
20. Moby – "Lift Me Up" (3:07)
21. Goldfrapp – "Ooh La La" (2:58)
22. Mylo – "In My Arms" (3:46)
