= Private School Kid =

Single by Sarah McLeod featuring Chris Cheney

from the album Beauty Was a Tiger
- Released: July 2005
- Genre: Alternative rock
- Length: 3:27
- Label: Festival Mushroom Records

Sarah McLeod singles chronology
"Let's Get Together" (2005)	"Private School Kid" (2005)	"All But Gone" (2006)

"Private School Kid" is an alternative rock song performed by Australian Sarah McLeod featuring Chris Cheney from The Living End. The song was released in July 2005 as the second single from McLeod's debut studio album, Beauty Was a Tiger (2005). The song peaked at number 33 on the Australian ARIA Singles Chart.

== Track listing ==
CD Single (022132)

1. "Private School Kid"
2. "Demolition Waltz"
3. "Private School Kid" (Demo)
4. "Let's Get Together (Behind the Scenes and Video)

== Charts ==
Chart (2005)	Peak Position
Australia (ARIA)	33
