= Jet Age (Superjesus album) =

Studio album by The Superjesus
- Released: 20 October 2000
- Studio: Festival Studios, Sydney
- Genre: Alternative rock; power pop
- Length: 50:28
- Label: EastWest; Warner Music Group
- Producer: Ed Buller

The Superjesus chronology
Sumo II (1998)	Jet Age (2000)	Rock Music (2003)

Singles from Jet Age
- 1. "Gravity" Released: 11 September 2000; 2. "Secret Agent Man" Released: 12 February 2001; 3. "Enough to Know" Released: 20 August 2001; 4. "Second Sun" Released: 11 February 2002

Jet Age is the second studio album by Australian rock band The Superjesus. The album was released in October 2000 and peaked at number 5 in Australia. The album was re-released in November 2001 and was certified platinum in 2002.

== Track listing ==
All lyrics are written by Sarah McLeod and Tim Henwood, except where otherwise noted

Standard edition
No.	Title	Writer(s)	Length
1.	"Over to You"	McLeod	3:02
2.	"Gravity"		3:59
3.	"Enough to Know"		3:13
4.	"In Harm's Way"		3:58
5.	"Secret Agent Man"		4:44
6.	"Second Sun"		4:49
7.	"Fall to Rescue"		3:51
8.	"Everything Turns"	McLeod, Chris Tennent	3:08
9.	"Safer Emergency"		4:06
10.	"When I Tell You in the End"	Henwood, McLeod, Stuart Rudd	3:54
11.	"Checking In"	McLeod	3:57
12.	"Holywater"	McLeod, Tennent	4:12
13.	"Everybody Calls Me Lonely" (hidden track)		3:33

Limited edition CD2: Live at "The Basement", Sydney, 3 September 2001
No.	Title	Length
1.	"Down Again"
2.	"Secret Agent Man"
3.	"Sandly"
4.	"Safer Emergency"
5.	"In Harm's Way"
6.	"Enough to Know"
7.	"Checking In"
8.	"I'm Stained"
9.	"Second Sun"
10.	"Gravity"

== Charts ==
=== Weekly charts ===
Weekly chart performance for Jet Age
Chart (2000–2001)	Peak position
Australian Albums (ARIA)	5

=== Year-end charts ===
Year-end chart performance for Jet Age
Chart (2001)	Rank
Australian Albums (ARIA)	93

== Certifications ==
Certifications for Jet Age
Region	Certification	Certified units/sales
Australia (ARIA)	Platinum	70,000^{^}
^{^} Shipments figures based on certification alone.

== Release history ==
Release history and formats for Jet Age
Country	Date	Format	Label	Catalogue
Australia	20 October 2000	CD	EastWest Records/Warner Music Group	8573852092
Australia	November 2001	2×CD	EastWest/Warner Music Group	0927419942
Australia	19 January 2018	Vinyl	Warner Music Group	5419790541
