= 100% Hits: Very Best of 2002 =

100% Hits: The Very Best of 2002

Compilation album by Various
- Released: November 25, 2002
- Label: EMI

Series chronology
| 100% Hits: The Best of 2001 + Summer Hits (2001) | 100% Hits: The Very Best of 2002 (2002) | 100% Hits: Best of 2003 (2003) |

100% Hits: The Very Best of 2002 is a 2002 compilation album released by EMI Music Australia and Warner Music Australia. The album was the #19 compilation album on the 2003 year-end charts in Australia. The album was certified platinum in Australia.

== Track listing ==
1. Kylie Minogue – "In Your Eyes" (3:18)
2. Disco Montego featuring Katie Underwood – "Beautiful" (3:42)
3. Paul Mac featuring Peta Morris – "The Sound of Breaking Up" (3:18)
4. Moby – "We Are All Made of Stars" (3:36)
5. Silverchair – "Without You" (4:17)
6. Coldplay – "In My Place" (3:49)
7. Alex Lloyd – "Green" (4:05)
8. Kasey Chambers – "Not Pretty Enough" (3:21)
9. Taxiride – "Creepin' Up Slowly" (3:58)
10. Michelle Branch – "Everywhere" (3:38)
11. Atomic Kitten – "It's OK!" (3:18)
12. Blue – "If You Come Back" (3:26)
13. Fat Joe featuring Ashanti – "What's Luv?" (3:52)
14. NSYNC – "Girlfriend" (4:16)
15. Daniel Bedingfield – "Gotta Get Thru This" (2:44)
16. iiO – "Rapture" (3:13)
17. Riva featuring Dannii Minogue – "Who Do You Love Now?" (3:27)
18. Britney Spears – "I'm Not a Girl, Not Yet a Woman" (3:52)
19. Robbie Williams and Nicole Kidman – "Somethin' Stupid" (2:48)
20. The Whitlams – "Fall for You" (3:46)
21. Motor Ace – "Carry On" (4:45)
22. P.O.D. – "Alive" (3:24)
