= Love and Violence =

EP by The Superjesus
- Released: 12 August 2016
- Genre: Rock; alternative rock; indie rock
- Label: Golden Robot Records; Social Family Records

The Superjesus chronology
Rock Music (2003)	Love and Violence (2016)	Sumo 20 Live (2019)

Singles from Love and Violence
- 1. "The Setting Sun" Released: 19 June 2015; 2. "St Peter's Lane" Released: November 2015; 3. "Love and Violence" Released: 26 July 2016

Love and Violence is the second extended play by Australian band The Superjesus, and first set of new recordings from the band since Rock Music in 2003.

Lead singer Sarah McLeod explained the title "Fire and passion, love and war, heaven and hell… These words always seem to go hand in hand, you can't have one without the other. Deep emotional relationships run the risk of deep emotional pain. Human nature is funny like that. Love and Violence is about looking at the oddity of emotional extremities and celebrating the immeasurable depth of human connection."

== Background ==
The Superjesus are an Australian rock band, who released three studio albums between 1998 and 2003 with EastWest Records/Warner Music Australia before splitting in 2004.

The band re-formed in 2013 with McLeod telling Northern Star "We only got back together in 2013 because our drummer (Paul Berryman) came back to Australia from Seattle, so we [bass player Stuart Rudd and lead singer McLeod] thought we could play one single show, see how the crowd responded and, more importantly, how we responded to each other and see if we had some musical chemistry together. The one show was better than we had hoped, crowd-wise and for ourselves." In mid-2015, co-headlined the She Who Rocks Tour with the Baby Animals, lead singer Suze DeMarchi. In June 2015, the band announced they'd signed with Social Family Records and released "The Setting Sun", their first single in over a decade. The band said "The band’s amped to be back in the game with new material, it’s been a long time coming." "St Peter's Lane" was released in November 2015 and in July 2016, the EP was announced alongside a 6-date tour.

== Reception ==
Professional ratings
Review scores
Source	Rating
The Music AU	3.5/5 stars

Ross Clelland from The Music AU gave the EP 3.5 out of 5 saying "Unlike many of their contemporaries, The Superjesus brand name retains a lot of goodwill. That pretty much comes down to Sarah McLeod's energiser bunny enthusiasm and energy, and her neat trick of displaying a little vulnerability among the rock-chick swagger — even as the guitars divebomb around." adding "Her parallel solo singer-songwriter work has developed her lyricism, but when the live version of "Come Back to Me" kicks in, you know they can still do the big swinging rock thing when required."

Tone Deaf said "It's the first record from the ARIA-winning outfit since their reformation in 2013 after a decade-long break, and the band haven’t lost any of the melodic punch."

== Track listing ==
No.	Title	Length
1.	"Come Back to Me"	4:28
2.	"The Setting Sun"	4:28
3.	"St Peter's Lane"	4:11
4.	"Love and Violence"	2:48
5.	"SeaSong"	5:06
6.	"Come Back to Me" (live)	4:22

== Tour ==
A 6-date tour was announced in July 2016.

Date	Location	Venue
7 October 2016	Sydney	Oxford Art Factory
8 October 2016	Newcastle	Cambridge Hotel
14 October 2016	Melbourne	The Corner Hotel
15 October 2016	Adelaide	Fowlers
28 October 2016	Byron Bay	The Northern
29 October 2016	Brisbane	Wolly Mammoth

== Release history ==
Country	Date	Format	Label	Catalogue
Australia	12 August 2016	digital download, streaming, CD	Golden Robot Records / Social Family Records	GOLDRR007
