= Welcome to the North =

Studio album by The Music
- Released: 20 September 2004
- Recorded: March–April 2004
- Studios: Southern Tracks Recording, Atlanta, Georgia
- Genres: Post-grunge, space rock
- Length: 55:13
- Label: Virgin
- Producer: Brendan O'Brien

The Music chronology
| The Music (2002) | Welcome to the North (2004) | Strength in Numbers (2008) |

Singles from Welcome to the North
- 1. "Freedom Fighters" Released: 6 September 2004; 2. "Breakin'" Released: 10 January 2005

Welcome to the North is the second studio album by British rock band the Music. It was released on 20 September 2004 through Virgin Records. Following the release of their self-titled debut studio album (2002), the band toured the United States in early 2003. By June 2003, they had begun writing for its follow-up; they took a break at the end of the year. Two months of sessions at Soundworks in Leeds occurred in early 2004. The band then travelled to Atlanta, Georgia in the US to record with producer Brendan O'Brien at Southern Tracks Recording. Welcome to the North is a post-grunge and space rock album, taking influence from the works of Jane's Addiction, Led Zeppelin and the Stone Roses.

The Music made their first live performance since recording at We Love Homelands festival in May 2004. "Welcome to the North" was posted through NME's website, ahead of the release of the album's lead single "Freedom Fighters" on 6 September 2004. The release of Welcome to the North was promoted with a tour of the United Kingdom with the Engineers. It was followed by a short brief, and then tour of the US with Incubus, leading into three UK shows to close out the year. "Bleed from Within" was planned to be the album's next single but was scrapped in favour of "Breakin'", which was issued on 10 January 2005. The Music then toured across North America with support from Kasabian, which was followed by another UK tour.

Welcome to the North received mixed reviews from critics, some of whom commented on the production and song quality, while others highlighted the array of musical styles. The album reached number eight in the UK Albums Chart; it reached the top 30 in both Japan and Australia, as well as the lower reaches of the Irish and French charts. "Freedom Fighters" peaked within the top 20 of the UK, in addition to charting in the Netherlands and the US. "Breakin'" reached a similar position in the UK, alongside charting in Australia and the US. Welcome to the North was certified silver in the UK by the British Phonographic Industry a few days after release, and later went gold in early 2005.

== Background ==
The Music released their self-titled debut studio album in September 2002, which peaked at number four on the UK Albums Chart. It was lauded by critics and went on to sell over 500,000 copies worldwide, one fifth of which was sold in the United Kingdom. All three of its singles reached the top 30 of the UK Singles Chart, with "Take the Long Road and Walk It" peaking the highest at number 14. This success prompted Capitol Records to issue the album in the United States in early 2003. The Music toured across this territory with Coldplay; by June 2003, they returned to the UK to start writing material for their next album. The band took a three-month break at the end of 2003. In January 2004, they were recorded their second album at Soundworks in Leeds. They paused recording to perform at the NME Awards on London, during which, they played four new songs; sessions continued into February 2004.

They had come up with six songs by this point, and told to go to Atlanta, Georgia in the US to finish writing material, as well as record it. Harvey's grandmother was ill at the time; the decision to go to Atlanta "sound[ed] nice, but not when you’ve been on tour for two years". They recorded at Southern Tracks Recording over the course of eight weeks in March and April 2004. Brendan O'Brien acted as the producer, with Nick DiDia handling recording. Karl Egsieker and Phil Martin served as second and additional engineer, respectively. The band chose O'Brien for his ability at capturing hard rock acts well in the studio, such as his past work with Pearl Jam, Red Hot Chili Peppers and Stone Temple Pilots, which was hoped to further the band's success at US radio stations. He mixed the recordings at the studio, before they were mastered by Bob Ludwig at Gateway Mastering in Portland, Maine.

== Composition and lyrics ==
Welcome to the North is a post-grunge and space rock album, drawing influences from Strays (2003) by Jane's Addiction, Presence (1976) by Led Zeppelin and Second Coming (1994) by the Stone Roses. Discussing the album, Harvey said: "[Y]ou're exposed to the harsh realities of the world. [... The album's title] sounds like kind of a small-minded statement in and of itself, but it's really about breaking free. That's basically what the whole album is about - it's about becoming universal". His vocals recall U2 frontman Bono, Robert Plant of Led Zeppelin and Perry Farrell from Jane's Addiction. The electronic nature of their debut had been toned down, as AllMusic reviewer MacKenzie Wilson wrote that the Music's "signature danceable stretch is still there, but it's stripped down for a more thoughtful rock design". The members typically wrote songs through jamming; though sometimes one of them would come up with a part and show it to the rest of the band.

Harvey said the opening song "Welcome to the North" served to "bridg[e] the gap really" between their previous album and this one. It starts with a Led Zeppelin-esque guitar riff, continuing with tribal rhythm sections, with the title phrase being repeated over a dozen times. Drummer Phil Jordan said Harvey explored "our difficulties of being 'northern' and all the identity issues that brings". "Freedom Fighters" is centred around a Southern rock guitar riff; Jordan said his drum pattern in it was a rewrite of the one in "The Truth Is No Words", a track from their debut. "Bleed from Within" features worldbeat grooves and talks about the invasion of Iraq and the futility of existence. Discussing the song, Jordan said they were in the US while the invasion was occurring, "seeing APC’s driving round the streets with police hanging off". Harvey tried to convey lies told by governments, and people suffer as a result. Part of its lyrics draw from "Pride (In the Name of Love)" (1984) by U2. During the song's breakdown, each member of the band were playing a separate drum kit, alongside O'Brien.

The vocal melody of "Breakin'" recalls the one heard in "In the Shadows" (2003) by the Rasmus, while its last minute sees Harvey beatbox. "Cessation" includes separate drum and bass solos, and is followed by "Fight the Feeling", which is a power ballad in 3/4 time. "Guide" is a homage to Harvey's parents; for the bass part, Jordan said he was listening to DAT tapes of their rehearsals and came across it. It started out as a Motown-sounding song when O'Brien first heard it. Discussing "Into the Night", which evokes the work of U2 and the Verve, Harvey said there were numerous songs "about women who rejected me". "I Need You" follows the indie-dance sound that dominated their debut album. The chorus of "One Way In, No Way Out" toys with power balladry, stadium rock territory. The album's closing track "Open Your Mind", which also cribs U2's sound, deals with being tolerant; it is followed by the hidden track "The Walls Get Smaller". Coleman said O'Brien sent him out to purchase a double bass solely for inclusion on the verses in "Open Your Mind". Jordan said they placed a blanket over his drum kit in order to achieve a muted effect when recorded.

== Release ==
In May 2004, the Music performed at the We Love Homelands festival, which was preceded by warm-up shows in Glasgow and Liverpool. On 13 July 2004, Welcome to the North was announced for release in two months' time; alongside this, its track listing was posted online. Six days later, "Welcome to the North" was posted on NME's website. "Freedom Fighters" was released as the album's lead single on 6 September 2004; the seven-inch vinyl version included a slow version of "Getaway" as its B-side. Two versions were released on CD: the first with "Come What May", while the second included "So Low", a Nick McCabe remix of "The People" and the music video for "Freedom Fighters". For the video, a stand-in was used for Jordan, who was suffering from anxiety and depression at the time.

Following this, the Music performed at BBC Radio 1's One Big Weekend. Welcome to the North was released on 20 September 2004 through Virgin Records. The CD version came with multiple Copy Control logos on the front and back of the sleeve, while the booklet spread included an essay on how to pirate music. It was promoted with a UK tour through to early October 2004 with support from the Engineers. The band went on a brief break prior to a tour of the US with Incubus. They closed out the year with a three-date tour in December 2004 at London, Manchester and Glasgow.

The Bleed from Within EP was released in Japan on 22 December 2004, which consisted "Bleed from Within", "Come What May", a demo of "Middle of Nowhere" and a remixes of "Bleed from Within" and "Freedom Fighters". "Bleed from Within" was planned for release as a single on 10 January 2005; however, because of issues with its music video, "Breakin'" was chosen as the next single instead. The seven-inch vinyl version included a radio session version of "Freedom Fighters" as its B-side. Two versions were released on CD: the first with the "Middle of Nowhere" demo, while the second included live and remix versions of "Bleed from Within". The music vieo for "Breakin'" was shot on a budget of $120,000.

A non-Copy Protection version of the album was issued in 2005; coinciding with this, a two-CD version was also released, which included a disc of live recordings from Liverpool. In February and March 2005, the Music went on a headlining North American tour, with support from Kasabian, leading up to an appearance at that year's South by Southwest music conference. The trek also included a performance on Jimmy Kimmel Live! on 14 March 2005. In April and May 2005, the band went on a smaller scale tour of the UK. A video album, which was filmed in Japan, was released under the title Welcome to Japan – Live. It included a 15-song set from Japan, with a six-song set from Liverpool and music videos as bonus material.

== Reception ==
Professional ratings
Aggregate scores
| Source | Rating |
|---|---|
| Metacritic | 57/100 |
Review scores
| Source | Rating |
| AllMusic | 4/5 stars |
| Cokemachineglow | 60% |
| Drowned in Sound | 6/10 |
| E! Online | C |
| The Guardian | 3/5 stars |
| NME | 9/10 |
| Pitchfork | 5/10 |
| Stylus Magazine | 7/10 |
| Tiny Mix Tapes | 2.5/5 stars |
| Yahoo! Launch | 5/10 stars |

Welcome to the North was met with mixed reviews from music critics. At Metacritic, the album received an average score of 57, based on 20 reviews.

Wilson said the album's direction was "much hungrier and angrier than its predecessor", calling it more "cohesive and direct compared to older dance numbers". She added that the "style and passion remain the same -- it's just a bit more uniform". Drowned in Sound writer Martin Leay found it to be "more varied record [...] with some evidence of a shifting musical direction". Steve Sutherland of NME the album "sounds colossal and is unafraid to take on the three giants of epic rock - Led Zep, U2 and [the] Music". Now writer Elizabeth Bromstein also pointed out that it "grows out of the same swirling, Zeppelinesque roots," calling it "more focused, eschewing dancey meandering in favour of a more homogeneous rock discipline". Pitchfork contributor Joe Tangari wrote that it "actually narrows the band's scope, morphing the Leeds quartet into a nu-Zeppelin pop Dream Theater with a vocalist that sounds a lot like [...] a cartoon of Geddy Lee". The staff at E! Online was dismissive, viewing it "all bombast and no substance".

Leay said it was full of "well-structured 'proper' songs," with a "cleaner and tighter sound [... that] makes for a much more enjoyable listening experience". Tangari said O'Brien's production was "hopelessly cluttered and flat given the relatively basic setup". Stylus Magazine's Nick Southall, however, complimented O'Brien's work for providing them a "more expensive, professional sound, just as massive and frenetic as the wilful teenage strafing they used to create". musicOMH contributor Jamie Harper referred to the album as a "contender for album of the year, every single song has something to love". David M. Goldstein of Cokemachineglow noted that while it "does offer some evidence of improved songwriting" over the band's first album, "it’s hardly going to convert any non-believers". Yahoo! Launch writer Chris Nye Browne said it "struggle[d] to mark [the band] out as anything more than average". The Boston Phoenix's Mikael Wood said it was full of "economy-sized riffs in search of songs and outdated glowstick atmospherics with nowhere to party".

Welcome to the North peaked at number eight on the UK Albums Chart, where it was certified silver four days after release, and gold by early 2005 by the British Phonographic Industry. It also charted at number ten in Japan, number 23 in Australia, number 43 on the US Billboard Heatseekers Albums chart, number 68 in Ireland and number 78 in France. "Freedom Fighters" charted at number 15 in the UK, number 39 Billboard Mainstream Rock Airplay chart, and number 100 in the Netherlands. "Breakin'" charted at number 20 in the UK, number 20 on the US Billboard Alternative Airplay chart, and number 63 in Australia.

== Track listing ==
Track listing per booklet.

1. "Welcome to the North" – 5:10
2. "Freedom Fighters" – 3:44
3. "Bleed from Within" – 6:27
4. "Breakin'" – 3:58
5. "Cessation" – 3:50
6. "Fight the Feeling" – 4:12
7. "Guide" – 4:13
8. "Into the Night" – 4:00
9. "I Need Love" – 3:46
10. "One Way In, No Way Out" – 3:50
11. "Open Your Mind" – 11:58 (includes the hidden track "The Walls Get Smaller")

== Personnel ==
Personnel per 2016 edition booklet.

The Music

- Robert Harvey – vocals
- Adam Nutter – guitar
- Stuart Coleman – bass
- Phil Jordan – drums

Production and design

- Brendan O'Brien – producer, mixing
- Nick DiDia – recording
- Karl Egsieker – second engineer
- Phil Martin – additional engineer
- Bob Ludwig – mastering
- Peter Saville – creative consultant
- James Greenhow – art direction, design
- Tom Skipp – art direction, design
- Rachel Thomas – set design
- Dan Tobin Smith – cover photography

== Charts and certifications ==
=== Weekly charts ===
Chart performance for Welcome to the North
| Chart (2004) | Peak position |
|---|---|
| Australian Albums (ARIA) | 23 |
| French Albums (SNEP) | 78 |
| Irish Albums (IRMA) | 68 |
| Japanese Albums (Oricon) | 10 |
| UK Albums (Official Charts) | 8 |
| US Heatseekers Albums (Billboard) | 43 |

=== Certifications ===
Certifications for Welcome to the North
| Region | Certification | Certified units/sales |
|---|---|---|
| United Kingdom (BPI) | Gold | 100,000^{^} |
^{^} Shipments figures based on certification alone.
