= Broken Arrow (band) =

Broken Arrow is a band from Los Angeles, California composed of American singer/songwriter, Brandi Emma, and Scottish singer/songwriter, Charlie Clark. The pair's first single, "Promises", was produced by Snow Patrol bassist, Paul Wilson. It was released on Indiscretion Records via Manimal Vinyl on March 18, 2016. BBC Radio Scotland debuted the single on March 7, 2016.

Billboard magazine premiered the music video for Promises on Billboard.com on March 28, 2016.

== Singles ==
Promises 2016
