= Here She Comes (The Androids song) =

Single by The Androids

from the album The Androids
- Released: February 2003
- Recorded: 2002
- Studio: Secret Sound Studios, Melbourne
- Genre: Pop
- Length: 3:11
- Label: Festival Mushroom Records
- Songwriter(s): Tim Henwood
- Producer(s): Pete Dacy; Adrian Hannan

The Androids singles chronology
"Do It with Madonna" (2002)	"Here She Comes" (2003)	"Brand New Life" (2003)

"Here She Comes" is a song by Australian rock band, The Androids. The song was released in February 2003 as the second single from the band's debut self-titled studio album. The song peaked at number 15 on the ARIA Charts.

== Track listing ==
- Australian CD single (021332)
1. "Here She Comes" - 3:11
2. "Automatic" - 2:11
3. "Straighten Up" - 1:47
4. "Don't Change" - 3:16
5. Video "Do It with Madonna"

== Charts ==
Chart (2003)	Peak position
Australia (ARIA)	15
