= Stellar Project =

Space technology startup

- Industry: Aerospace, Telecommunications equipment, Networking equipment
- Founded: 2016; 10 years ago
- Headquarters: Padua, Italy
- Products: Laser communication equipment for aircraft and satellites, Optical ground stations

Stellar Project is a space technology startup manufacturing laser communication equipment and providing optical satellite communication equipment.

== History ==
In 2016, Stellar Project was founded as a spin-off of the University of Padua, Italy where their first proprietary and patented technology started to take shape.

In 2021 Stellar Project launched for the first time LaserCube, laser communication terminal, in space aboard SpaceX’s Falcon 9 Transporter-2 mission.

== Products ==
Stellar Project developed LaserCube through a proprietary and patented technology.

LaserCube is an optical communication terminal conceived for nano and microsatellites starting from the 6U form factor. The terminal is peculiar due to two distinctive features:

• dedicated coarse pointing system with 50 μrad RMS accuracy, which relieves the satellite ADCS to perform ultra-accurate pointing;

• in its Inter-satellite Link version, LaserCube can transmit and receive data through laser links at the same optical wavelength; this way, any identical LaserCube units can communicate bidirectionally.

The technology developed by Stellar Project enables business opportunities in the growing NewSpace Economy related to the employment of CubeSats, including Earth imagery, weather forecasting, global telecommunications and internet services, Internet of things(IoT), and Machine to Machine (M2M).

== Activities ==
The company works in consortium with the H2020 program on Quantum Communication and started to expand its own activities on data analytics both for terrestrial applications and the space environment providing tools for Space Debris Analysis and monitoring.

== See also ==
- Laser communication in space
- NewSpace
- Satellite constellation
- Quantum key distribution
- Space Debris
