= Saturation (song) =

1997 single by the Superjesus

Single by the Superjesus

from the album Sumo
- B-side: "Face Down"
- Released: 24 November 1997
- Recorded: Triclops Sound (Atlanta, Georgia)
- Genre: Alternative rock
- Length: 4:08
- Label: EastWest
- Songwriters: Sarah McLeod; Chris Tennent
- Producer: Matt Serletic

The Superjesus singles chronology
"Down Again" (1997)	"Saturation" (1997)	"Now and Then" (1998)

"Saturation" is a song by Australian rock band the Superjesus. It was released in November 1997 as the second single from their debut studio album, Sumo (1998). The song peaked at number 42 on the Australian ARIA Singles Chart. In January 1999, the song was ranked at number 99 on the Triple J Hottest 100 of 1998.

== Track listing ==
CD single

1. "Saturation" – 4:08
2. "Face Down" – 3:24

== Charts ==
Chart (1997)	Peak position
Australia (ARIA)	42
