= Stick Together (The Superjesus song) =

2003 single by the Superjesus

Single by the Superjesus

from the album Rock Music
- B-side: "Politically Right"; "Backburner"
- Released: 14 April 2003
- Length: 4:16
- Label: EastWest
- Songwriters: Sarah McLeod; Stuart Rudd

The Superjesus singles chronology
"Second Sun" (2002)	"Stick Together" (2003)	"Over and Out" (2003)

"Stick Together" is a song by Australian band the Superjesus. The song was released in April 2003 as the lead single from the band's third studio album, Rock Music (2003). The song peaked at number 35 on the Australian ARIA Singles Chart, becoming the band's fourth and final top-40 single. In October 2014, the Superjesus went into Music Feeds Studio and performed an acoustic version of "Stick Together".

== Track listing ==
CD single

1. "Stick Together"
2. "Politically Right"
3. "Backburner"
- CD is enhanced with screensavers, wallpaper, photos and exclusive video

== Charts ==
Chart (2003)	Peak Position
Australia (ARIA)	35
