= Gravity (The Superjesus song) =

2000 single by the Superjesus

Single by the Superjesus

from the album Jet Age
- B-side: "Everybody Calls Me Lonely"; "Miss This"
- Released: September 2000
- Studio: Festival (Sydney, Australia)
- Length: 4:01
- Label: EastWest
- Songwriters: Sarah McLeod; Tim Henwood
- Producer: Ed Buller

The Superjesus singles chronology
| "Ashes" (1998) | "Gravity" (2000) | "Secret Agent Man" (2001) |

"Gravity" is a song by Australian band the Superjesus. It was released in September 2000 as the lead single from the band's second studio album, Jet Age (2000). Although originally disliked by other band members, "Gravity" peaked at number 35 on the Australian ARIA Singles Chart. In January 2001, the song was ranked as number 17 on the Triple J Hottest 100 of 2000.

== Track listing ==
CD single

1. "Gravity" – 4:01
2. "Everybody Calls Me Lonely" – 3:32
3. "Miss This" – 3:19

== Charts ==
| Chart (2000) | Peak position |
|---|---|
| Australia (ARIA) | 35 |
