= Brandi Emma =

American actress and singer-songwriter

Brandi Emma, also known by the stage name Emma Burgess, is an American actress and singer-songwriter. who released her first album, Swim, produced by Rusty Anderson and Ofer Moses, in 2007 on Love Yourself Records. The album features musicians Josh Freese, Joey Waronker and Mike Garson.

Her cover of The Outfield song "Your Love" appeared on ABC Family show Wildfire in February 2008.

== Early life ==
Brandi Emma was born in Massachusetts on December 9, 1981.

== Career ==
Brandi Emma is a Los Angeles-based singer-songwriter who gained considerable critical buzz with the record Swim under the moniker Emma Burgess, the title song of which Rolling Stone Magazine named Best Independent Song of 2007. Prior to that, her 2005 collaboration with The Stellar Project landed her on the No. 1 position for 8 straight weeks on the US. Billboard dance charts with the song Get Up Stand Up. The song reached No. 1 in France, Island Of Malta, and Italy, and peaked at No. 14 on the UK Singles chart.

After collaborating with The Smart Set for 2009's Mixing with the Smart Set, she self-released Photographic Memory, a jangly folk-rock EP that returned to her roots. She's collaborated with Charlie Clark on his debut EP, Feel Something, on AED Records in the UK. 2013 saw the release of Xtraordinary Things, under the moniker The Fox Must Pay, exploring epic electronic dreamscapes. Her latest project, Broken Arrow (with Clark), released their first single, Promises, on March 18, 2016, through Indiscretion Records via Manimal Records.

As an actress, she appeared in the film Nightstalker with Roselyn Sanchez, Bret Roberts, Joseph McKelheer and Roxanne Day. It was written and directed by Chris Fisher.

== Filmography ==
=== Film ===
- Little Savant (1999) ..... Posse Member
- Nightstalker (2002) ..... Adrienne Deloia
- Huh? (2005) ..... Jamie
- 180 (2005) ..... Fran

== Discography ==
=== Albums ===
- Swim (2007)
- Mixing with the Smart Set (2009)
- Photographic Memory (2010)
- Xtraordinary Things – The Fox Must Pay (2013)

=== Singles ===
- "Get Up Stand Up" – Stellar Project featuring Brandi Emma (2004)
- "Promises" – Broken Arrow (2016)
