= Eight Step Rail =

EP by The Superjesus
- Released: May 1996
- Genre: Post-grunge, alternative rock

The Superjesus chronology
Eight Step Rail (1996)	Sumo (1998)

Eight Step Rail is the debut EP by Australian rock band The Superjesus. The EP was released in May 1996.

The track "I'm Stained" was later re-recorded for their debut album, Sumo. A re-recorded version of "Shut My Eyes" was also later included as a hidden track on Sumo.

The big guitar sounds are yet another use of the infamous Sansamp from Tech 21. After the engineer (Mick Wordley of Mixmasters Studios in Adelaide, Australia) spent a day trying to get a big sound out of Marshall stacks, he could not go past the sound the band had achieved by direct injecting a Sansamp into their Fostex recorder.

At the ARIA Music Awards of 1997, the EP won two ARIA Awards, "Best New Talent" and "Breakthrough Artist – Single".

== Track listing ==
No.	Title	Writer(s)	Length
1.	"Ground"	Chris Tennent; Sarah McLeod	3:42
2.	"Shut My Eyes"	Tennent; McLeod	3:28
3.	"I'm Stained"	Tennent; McLeod	4:40
4.	"Glazed"	Tennent; McLeod	4:28
5.	"Strips of You"	Tennent; McLeod	4:34

== Charts ==
Chart (1997)	Peak position
Australia (ARIA)	47
