= Get Up Stand Up (Stellar Project song) =

Single by Stellar Project featuring Brandi Emma
- Released: 2004
- Studio: HND Studio, Milan
- Genre: Europop; House; Synth-pop
- Length: Radio Edit: 2:55 Phunk Investigation Vocal Mix: 7:46
- Label: ARS Entertainment Belgium, Universal Music Ministry Of Sound/Data Records Ultra Records
- Songwriter(s): Armando Maggiorana; Kevin Hunter; Stefano Silvestri; Stefano Sorrentino
- Producer(s): Stefano Sorrentino

Music video
- "Get Up Stand Up" on YouTube

"Get Up Stand Up" is a 2004 song by the Italian dance project Stellar Project, created by songwriter and producer Stefano Sorrentino, featuring American actress and singer Brandi Emma.

Their song reached number one on the US dance airplay chart dated 20 November 2004. Their song also reached number 14 on the UK Singles Chart in 2004.

== Track listing ==
1. "Get Up Stand Up" (Phunk Investigation Radio Mix) – 2:55
2. "Get Up Stand Up" (Phunk Investigation Club Vocal Mix) – 7:46
3. "Get Up Stand Up" (F & W Remix) – 6:11
4. "Get Up Stand Up" (Paul Jackson Head Banger Mix) – 6:56
5. "Get Up Stand Up" (Phunk Investigation ElettroDub Mix) – 7:48

== Charts ==
=== Weekly charts ===
Weekly chart performance for "Get Up Stand Up"
Chart (2004)	Peak position
Australia (ARIA)	88
Belgium (Ultratip Bubbling Under Wallonia)	3
France (SNEP)	16
Italy (FIMI)	42
Netherlands (Single Top 100)	38
UK Singles (OCC)	14
US Dance/Mix Show Airplay (Billboard)	1

=== Year-end charts ===
Year-end chart performance for "Get Up Stand Up"
Chart (2005)	Position
Russia Airplay (TopHit)	159
