= The Music =

English alternative rock band

- Origin: Kippax, West Yorkshire, England
- Genres: Alternative rock, indie rock, indietronica, alternative dance
- Years active: 1999–2011; 2020–2022
- Labels: EMI; Hut; Capitol
- Past members: Robert Harvey; Adam Nutter; Stuart Coleman; Phil Jordan

The Music were an English alternative rock band, formed in Kippax, Leeds in 1999. Comprising Robert Harvey (vocals, guitar), Adam Nutter (lead guitar), Stuart Coleman (bass) and Phil Jordan (drums), the band came to prominence with the release of their self-titled debut album in 2002. The band released two further studio albums, Welcome to the North (2004) and Strength in Numbers (2008), before parting ways in 2011.

== Career ==
The Music all met at Brigshaw High School (except Phil Jordan, who went to Garforth Community College), and began playing in 1999 as Insense. In 2001, the song "Take the Long Road and Walk It" circulated as a demo before being released by Fierce Panda as a 1000-copies-only single, a rarity from its day of release. Around this time NME and Steve Lamacq were describing them as the best unsigned band in Britain. The band was quickly signed by Hut, who released their first EP You Might as Well Try to Fuck Me.

In 2002, following another EP (The People) they released The Music which reached No. 4 in the UK album charts. Their debut single was re-issued as part of a two-disc set to promote the album, and reached No. 14 in the singles chart. Two further singles from the album, "Getaway" and "The Truth is No Words" reached No. 26 and No. 18 respectively. June 2003 saw them fill in for an absent Zwan on the Pyramid Stage at Glastonbury Festival.

In autumn 2004, they released their second album Welcome to the North and the accompanying single "Freedom Fighters", before touring with Incubus. August 2005 saw the band play at the dual-venue V Festival. In late 2006 they played a few UK gigs and subsequently posted on their site the video for the new song entitled Fire, which would eventually be released on Strength in Numbers two years later. The site also featured a video for unreleased track Kill 100 by X-Press 2 featuring Robert Harvey.

The band signed a new deal with Polydor in 2007 and spent the rest of the year recording their third album with producers Flood and Paul Hartnoll.

During this time Harvey also revealed the reason for the band's extended absence. On The Music's official website, he told of his initial abuse of drugs in his mid-teens: "the addiction began to sit into its groove. At first it was a joy then later became a habit and a way of escaping." He later quit drugs, but around the time of the band's second album, had replaced the addiction with alcohol: "Drinking became the place to hide. I'd have a bottle of wine before 7 pm, then go out and make a fool of myself. The next day was always panic and more questions it took a close friend to say to me 'Robert, you are depressed'". He sought help at the end of 2005, and undertook a program that included medication.

In June 2008, the band released their comeback single "Strength in Numbers", and the album Strength in Numbers the following week.

In January 2010, the band began demoing material for their fourth studio album. The album was due for release sometime in 2011. However, Harvey left the band in September 2010, and following a series of final farewell shows, The Music split up in August 2011.

Harvey went on to work extensively with Mike Skinner, beginning with a Christmas song in December 2010 called Scrooge And Marley – I Don't Want It To Be Me, and continuing with The Streets' 2011 album Computers and Blues. Shortly after The Music disbanded, Harvey embarked on a new musical project dubbed The D.O.T. with Skinner. The duo released an album, And That, on 22 October 2012.

On 31 March 2011, The Music announced a series of farewell gigs on their website. The band played three shows in Japan 25–27 July. They then played Brixton Academy London, England on 4 August, before bringing the curtain down on their career with two home town gigs at the O2 Academy in Leeds on 5 and 6 August.

On 21 April 2011 the band released the newest and final song of their career on their official website. "Ghost Hands" was recorded for their scrapped fourth studio album sessions. Talking about the single, lead singer Robert Harvey said:

"We love the track and it just seemed a shame to leave it gathering dust forever. It's good to go out with something positive and new and we think it deserves to see the light of day. Hopefully the fans will agree – again we want to thank everyone who's been with us on this journey and look forward to celebrating an amazing ten years this summer."

Following the end of their final tour, the band, in conjunction with Concert Live, released a live CD/DVD package entitled The Last Dance: Live which captured the performances from 4 and 6 August respectively.

On 4 September 2020, The Music announced that they were to reform, and would perform at Temple Newsam in May 2021. This was ultimately rescheduled for June 2022. A live album and concert film, Live at Temple Newsam, was released later that year. Following the shows, Harvey returned to touring with Kasabian, while Nutter released his debut solo album Badlands On Fire in April 2023.

== Band members ==
- Robert Harvey – lead vocals, guitar
- Adam Nutter – guitar
- Stuart Coleman – bass
- Phil Jordan – drums

== Discography ==
=== Studio and compilation albums ===
Year	Details	Peak chart positions							Certifications (sales thresholds)
Year	Details	UK	AUS	FRA	IRE	ITA	JPN	US	Certifications (sales thresholds)
2002	The Music: Released: 2 September 2002; Label: Hut/Capitol	4	25	36	39	16	20	128	BPI: Gold; ARIA: Gold; RIAJ: Gold
2004	Welcome to the North: Released: 20 September 2004; Label: Virgin	8	23	78	68	—	10	—	BPI: Gold
2008	Strength in Numbers: Released: 16 June 2008; Label: Polydor	19	30	—	—	—	19	—	
2011	Singles and EPs: 2001–2005: Released: 31 January 2011; Label: Virgin	—	—	—	—	—	81	—	
"-" denotes releases that did not chart.

=== Singles and EPs ===
Year	Title	Peak chart positions				Album
Year	Title	UK	AUS	NLD	US Mod	Album
2001	"Take the Long Road and Walk It"	92	—	—	—	
2001	"You Might as Well Try to Fuck Me"	—	—	—	—	
2002	"The People"	— (Note: The People E.P. did not enter the UK Singles chart, but peaked at number 35 on the UK Indie Chart.)	77	—	—	The Music
2002	"Take the Long Road and Walk It" (reissue)	14	—	—	—	The Music
2002	"Getaway"	26	—	—	—	The Music
2003	"The Truth Is No Words"	18	77 (Note: "The Truth Is No Words" was released in Australia as a double A-side with "The People".)	—	—	The Music
2004	"Welcome to the North"	— (Note: "Welcome to the North" did not enter the UK Singles chart, but peaked at number 3 on the UK Download Chart.)	—	—	—	Welcome to the North
2004	"Freedom Fighters"	15	—	100	—	Welcome to the North
2004	"Bleed From Within"	—	—	—	—	Welcome to the North
2005	"Breakin'"	20	63	—	20	Welcome to the North
2008	"Strength in Numbers"	38	—	—	—	Strength in Numbers
2008	"The Spike"	114	—	—	—	Strength in Numbers
2008	"Drugs"	—	—	—	—	Strength in Numbers
"—" denotes releases that did not chart.

=== DVDs ===
- Live at the Blank Canvas (1 September 2003)
- Welcome to Japan (18 July 2005)
- The Last Dance: Live (August 2011)
