= Strength in Numbers (The Music album) =

Studio album by The Music
- Released: 16 June 2008
- Recorded: 2008
- Studio: Townhouse, Magnetic North
- Genre: Electronic
- Length: 54:58
- Label: Polydor, Yes, Please!
- Producer: Flood; Paul Hartnoll; The Music

The Music chronology
Welcome to the North (2004)	Strength in Numbers (2008)	Singles and EPs: 2001 – 2005 (2011)

Singles from Strength in Numbers
- 1. "Strength in Numbers" Released: 9 June 2008; 2. "The Spike" Released: 11 August 2008; 3. "Drugs" Released: 13 October 2008

Strength in Numbers is the third and final studio album by English rock band The Music. It was released on 16 June 2008 by Polydor Records and Yes, Please!.

It comes in two formats, a regular CD (in a super jewel case) and a deluxe digipak Edition. The limited edition features two bonus tracks, "The Price" and "The Rain", but does not feature the hidden track "No Danger".

== Background ==
The Music released their second album Welcome to the North in September 2004, peaking at number eight on the UK Albums Chart. Both of its singles – "Freedom Fighters" and "Breakin'" – reached the top 20 of the UK Singles Chart, with the former peaking the highest at number 15. The album was promoted with three UK tours and two US tours, one with Incubus and the other supported by Kasabian, leading up to May 2005. They went on a hiatus while frontman Robert Harvey suffered from alcohol addiction and depression, which saw him spend time in a rehab facility. He explained that the reception to the album from critics gave him "similar symptoms to a mid-life crisis".

The Music played a comeback show in December 2006 in Leeds, where they debuted four new songs. Their next album was recorded at Townhouse Studios in London and Magnetic North Studios with engineer Max Dingel and assistant recording engineer Alex MacKenzie. Flood and Paul Hartnoll co-produced the majority of the songs, with them doing additional production on "Idle" and "Inconceivable Odds"; these two were produced by the band. Richard McNamara of Embrace produced and mixed "No Danger". Dingel mixed the rest of recordings at Assault & Battery Studios, before the album was mastered by Howie Weinberg at Masterdisk in New York City.

== Composition ==
Julian Marszalek of BBC Music said to counteract the "domination of neighbours Kaiser Chiefs and The Pigeon Detectives", Strength in Numbers has the Music "fighting back by venturing deep into electronic territory". AllMusic reviewer Andrew Leahey said the album's "loud, bombastic moments" make them come across as the "younger siblings of Muse". Dom Gourlay of Drowned in Sound suggested that ten of the album's 12 tracks included "references [...] to a time when the future of the band, and Harvey's career in the music business for that matter, seemed to be in doubt".

The chorus sections in "The Spike" evoke the work of New Order, while it was overall compared to Apollo 440. "Drugs" comes across as a mix between Coldplay and Moby; "Idle" features hard-panned acoustic instrumentation, backing an Elbow-esque chorus section. "The Left Side" is a mid-tempo song that borrows from 1980s gothic rock. "Fire" begins with U2-esque guitar riff that recalls their song "Vertigo" (2004), leading into a new wave sound in the vein of the band's earlier songs, such as "Getaway" and "Take the Long Road and Walk It" from their 2002 self-titled debut studio album. "Get Through It" takes influence from Primal Scream, sharing the same drum pattern as that band's song "Swastika Eyes" (1999), and is followed by the baggy track "Vision". "No Weapon Sharper Than Will" is a rave-rock song; the album's closing song "Inconceivable Odds" is an acoustic ballad, reminiscent of the work of Richard Ashcroft. The hidden track "No Danger" is a Led Zeppelin-lite freak-out.

== Release and promotion ==
In March 2008, the band played a short, four-date tour of the UK under the banner of the Four Cities tour. They repeated this with four UK shows in April 2008 with support from the Officers and then again in May 2008. The idea was that the band would return to the same cities in successive months at bigger venues per occasion. On 9 April 2008, Strength in Numbers was announced for release in two months' time; alongside this, the track listing was posted online. "Strength in Numbers" was released as the album's lead single on 9 June 2008; the CD edition included "Symbol of Hope", "What Am I" and "Traps". Two versions were released on seven-inch vinyl record: the first with a remixe of "Strength in Numbers" by the Whip, while the other featured "Victim". Strength in Numbers was released on 16 June 2008 through Polydor Records and Yes, Please!. A special edition was released in Europe, which included the bonus tracks "The Price" and "The Rain", while the Japanese edition included various B-sides and remixes.

Following an appearance at the Isle of Wight Festival, the band went on another tour of the UK, running into July 2008, and ending with a performance at T in the Park. "The Spike" was released as the second single from the album on 11 August 2008. The seven-inch vinyl record version included "Honest", while the CD edition featured "Just Cos I'm Alone", "Hands on Fire" and a remix of "The Spike". Harvey played a one-off acoustic show that same month. "Drugs" was issued as the album's third and final single on 13 October 2008; it was released as a two-disc seven-inch vinyl record set with "Funky" and remixes of "Drugs". The following day, the music video for "Drugs" preimiered on This Is Fake DIY's website. The single was promoted with tour of the UK that same month; it was followed by a short stint in Japan. Coinciding with this, another edition of the album was released in Japan, which featured a DVD with music videos, live performances and a documentary. In February 2009, the band toured Australia as part of the nationwide tour The Big O, headlining alongside the Fratellis.

== Reception ==
Professional ratings
Aggregate scores
Source	Rating
Metacritic	54/100
Review scores
Source	Rating
AllMusic	3.5/5 stars
Drowned in Sound	6/10
God Is in the TV	3.5/5
The Guardian	2/5 stars
NME	3.5/5 stars
Pitchfork	5.1/10
Yahoo! Music	4/10 stars

Strength in Numbers was met with mixed reviews from critics. At Metacritic, which assigns a weighted average rating out of 100 to reviews from mainstream publications, this release received an average score of 54 based on ten reviews.

Leahey thought the Strength in Numbers turned "out to be a nice comeback, particularly during the tracks that find that sweet spot between bubbling electronics and stadium Brit-rock". Gourlay explained that while the album is "not exactly redefining the zeitgeist," it was a substantial improvement "than anyone could have expected". NME writer Hamish McBain said the "fire is still there, along with a new-found eloquence", though mentioned that the new rave scene "ain’t going to make it easy for The Music [...] to spread their appeal beyond the already-signed-up this time around". James Berry of Yahoo! Music felt that one of the band's issues was that they appeared "happy to key in co-ordinates and take the most efficient route, trusting neither their hearts nor their heads". The Jerusalem Post's David Brinn wrote that the album "may sound great on the dance floor, but on CD the songs are repetitive, unimaginative and utterly immemorable".

Gourlay felt Hartnoll's production "seems to have watered their sound down, and at times it is hard to distinguish one song from the next". The Guardian critic Dave Simpson remarked that Hartnoll's "electronic chassis" outed the band as an "even less subtle Kasabian". Pitchfork contributor Ian Cohen was critical of Hartnoll's work, stating that his "wall-banging production raises serious questions about whether human hands actually made anything on Strength in Numbers". Matthew Shaw of Is this music? pointed out that the opening song "should only really pass for a demo", which was a "thematic problem for quite a few of the songs".

Strength in Numbers charted at number 13 in Scotland and number 19 in the UK .

== Track listing ==
All songs written by the Music.

Strength in Numbers track listing
No.	Title	Length
1.	"Strength In Numbers"	3:41
2.	"The Spike"	4:01
3.	"Drugs"	5:20
4.	"Idle"	3:37
5.	"The Left Side"	3:29
6.	"Fire"	2:58
7.	"Get Through It"	2:58
8.	"Vision"	4:23
9.	"The Last One"	3:44
10.	"No Weapon Sharper Than Will"	3:51
11.	"Cold Blooded"	4:20
12.	"Inconceivable Odds" (includes hidden track "No Danger")	12:43

== Personnel ==
Personnel per booklet.

The Music

- Robert Harvey – vocals, reverse guitar, sequencers, percussion, gang vocals (track 8), claps (track 8)
- Adam Nutter – guitars, sequencers, piano, synths, drum programming, strings, mandolins, bass, harmonica, gang vocals (track 8), claps (track 8)
- Stuart Coleman – bass
- Phil Jordan – drums, gang vocals (track 8), claps (track 8)

Additional musicians

- Flood – ARP rhythms, gang vocals (track 8), claps (track 8)
- Paul Hartnoll – sequencers, synths, programmed beats, reverse reverb vocal effect
- Alex Mackenzie – gang vocals (track 8), claps (track 8)

Production and design

- Flood – co-producer (all except tracks 4 and 12), additional production (tracks 4 and 12)
- Paul Hartnoll – co-producer (all except tracks 4 and 12), additional production (tracks 4 and 12)
- The Music – producer (tracks 4 and 12)
- Richard McNamara – producer (hidden track), mixing (hidden track)
- Max Dingel – engineer, mixing
- Alex Mackenzie – assistant recording engineer
- Howie Weinberg – mastering
- Rob Carter – image
- Smiler Assoc – image

== Charts ==
Chart performance for Strength in Numbers
Chart (2008)	Peak position
Australian Albums (ARIA)	30
Scottish Albums (OCC)	13
UK Albums (OCC)	19
