= Paul Berryman =

Australian musician

- Born: Paul Michael Berryman; Adelaide, South Australia, Australia
- Genre: Alternative rock
- Occupation: Musician
- Instrument: Drums
- Years active: 1994–present

Paul Michael Berryman is an Australian musician who played drums for alternative rockers, the Superjesus (1994–2004, 2013–16), and Faker (2003–08). Nathan Hudson of Faker explained why Berryman had replaced founding drummer Andrew Day, "We could record something that would get people interested, but people would come to see us and go, 'Well, it's not convincing, it's not the band I heard on record'. When [Berryman] joined, the musical bar was lifted and it became more about the music and the songs." He was later a member of Miss Mandaband and then Vicious. After his second stint with the Superjesus, Berryman relocated to the United States in April 2016.
