= Do It with Madonna =

2002 single by the Androids

Single by the Androids

from the album The Androids
- B-side: "Gone"; "Overdose"; "Inside Out"
- Released: 28 October 2002
- Studio: Secret Sound (Melbourne)
- Length: 3:49
- Label: Festival Mushroom; Universal
- Songwriters: Tim Henwood; Cameron McKenzie
- Producers: Pete Dacy; Adrian Hannan

The Androids singles chronology
"Do It with Madonna" (2002)	"Here She Comes" (2003)

"Do It with Madonna" is a song by Australian rock band the Androids, released as their debut single on 28 October 2002. It was included on their first studio album, The Androids. The song peaked at number four on the Australian Singles Chart and was certified platinum by the Australian Recording Industry Association (ARIA) in 2003. Worldwide, the song reached the top 50 in Ireland, New Zealand, and the United Kingdom. The music video, directed by Bart Borghesi, won the ARIA Award for Best Video at the ARIA Music Awards of 2003.

== Background ==
The song compares pop singers Christina Aguilera, Pink, Britney Spears and Kylie Minogue, with the lyrics ultimately expressing a preference for Madonna. Songwriter Tim Henwood told The Age that he wrote "'Do It with Madonna' in 20 minutes and recorded a demo between midnight and 5am. He said that he had been careful not to insult the singers mentioned in the song. Madonna later requested a copy of the song for review and "loves it".

== Track listing ==
- Australian CD single (021212)
1. "Do It with Madonna" – 3:49
2. "Gone" – 1:55
3. "Overdose" – 2:24
4. "Inside Out" – 4:10
- European CD single (Universal Records 019 973-2)
1. "Do It with Madonna" – 3:49
2. "Gone" – 1:55

== Charts ==
=== Weekly charts ===
Chart (2002–2003)	Peak position
Australia (ARIA)	4
Europe (Eurochart Hot 100)	61
Ireland (IRMA)	42
Netherlands (Single Top 100)	92
New Zealand (Recorded Music NZ)	42
Scottish Singles Sales (Official Charts)	12
UK Singles (Official Charts)	15

=== Year-end charts ===
Chart (2002)	Position
Australia (ARIA)	42
Australian Artists (ARIA)	15

Chart (2003)	Position
Australia (ARIA)	41
Australian Artists (ARIA)	8

== Certifications ==
Region	Certification	Certified units/sales
Australia (ARIA)	Platinum	70,000^{^}
^{^} Shipments figures based on certification alone.

== Release history ==
Region	Date	Format	Label	Ref(s).
Australia	28 October 2002	CD	Festival Mushroom	
United States	24 March 2003	Alternative radio	Universal	
United Kingdom	5 May 2003	CD	Universal	
