= Down Again =

1997 single by the Superjesus

Single by the Superjesus

from the album Sumo
- B-side: "Blisterment"
- Released: 25 August 1997
- Recorded: Triclops Sound (Atlanta, US)
- Length: 4:36
- Label: EastWest
- Songwriters: Sarah McLeod; Chris Tennent
- Producer: Matt Serletic

The Superjesus singles chronology
"Down Again" (1997)	"Saturation" (1997)

"Down Again" is a song by Australian band the Superjesus. The song was released in August 1997 as the lead single from the band's debut studio album, Sumo (1998), and peaked at number 23 on the Australian ARIA Singles Chart. In January 1998, the song was ranked number 14 in the Triple J Hottest 100 of 1997.

== Reception ==
Double J named it in the top fifty Australian songs of the 1990s, saying, "McLeod's clear impassioned vocals come in over a slow built intro of stoner-like-post-grunge-come-light-industrial. "Down Again" is a glorious, bombastic cry for help. And a damn fine karaoke/guitar hero jam."

== Track listing ==
CD single

1. "Down Again" (radio edit) – 4:36
2. "Down Again" (LP version) – 5:17
3. "Blisterment" – 3:04

== Charts ==
Chart (1997)	Peak position
Australia (ARIA)	23

== Certifications ==
Certifications for "Down Again"
Region	Certification	Certified units/sales
Australia (ARIA)	Gold	35,000^{‡}
^{‡} Sales+streaming figures based on certification alone.
