= The Music (album) =

Studio album by The Music
- Released: 2 September 2002
- Studio: Jacobs, Farnham, Surrey, England
- Genre: Indie rock, alternative rock, dance-rock, psychedelic rock
- Length: 52:06
- Label: Hut
- Producer: Jim Abbiss

The Music chronology
The Music (2002)	Welcome to the North (2004)

Singles from The Music
- 1. "Take the Long Road and Walk It" Released: 19 August 2002; 2. "Getaway" Released: 18 November 2002; 3. "The Truth Is No Words" Released: 17 February 2003

Professional ratings
Aggregate scores
Source	Rating
Metacritic	58/100
Review scores
Source	Rating
AllMusic	4/5 stars
Blender	2/5 stars
Entertainment Weekly	B+
Mojo	2/5 stars
NME	7/10
Pitchfork	4.7/10
Q	3/5 stars
Rolling Stone	3/5 stars
Spin	C+
Uncut	7/10

The Music is the debut album by British rock band The Music, released on 2 September 2002. It was certified gold in Japan for 100,000 copies shipped in March 2003.

== Background ==
The Music was released on 22 September 2002, when all four band members had only recently turned eighteen years of age.

== Composition ==
The album has been described as incorporating elements of psychedelia, dance-rock, post-grunge, electronica and hard rock.

== Reception ==
The album received mixed reviews from critics. AllMusic wrote an enthusiastic review, calling the album "an incredible debut and a brilliant example of where rock could be headed", stating that it is more "stylish" than many of the band's contemporaries in the garage rock revival scene, namely the Hives, the Vines, and the Strokes.

Several other publications, however, were more critical of the album. Blender dubbed the album as "one of the most hilariously overheated debuts in memory" and criticised the production, scoring the album a 2 out of 5. Pitchfork also made similar complaints about the production, praising Harvey's vocals and several tracks such as "Take The Long Road and Walk It", "Too High" and "Float", but overall concluded that the album sounds "overproduced and underdeveloped" and was also indifferent to the songwriting. They also ridiculed the band name, stating that it "makes them impossible to find on the web and the butt of any number of easy jokes".

== Track listing ==
All tracks written by The Music.

1. "The Dance" – 5:08
2. "Take the Long Road and Walk It" – 4:53
3. "Human" – 5:28
4. "The Truth Is No Words" – 4:35
5. "Float" – 5:21
6. "Turn Out the Light" – 6:23
7. "The People" – 4:58
8. "Getaway" – 6:29
9. "Disco" – 6:36
10. "Too High" – 5:55

The UK release of this album also contains a track in the pregap called "New Instrumental", which plays upon rewinding from the start of "The Dance". A live version of this song also appeared as the B-side to "Take the Long Road and Walk It".

== Personnel ==
=== The Music ===
- Robert Harvey – vocals, rhythm guitar
- Adam Nutter – lead guitar
- Stuart Coleman – bass
- Phil Jordan – drums

=== Production ===
- Jim Abiss – production

== Charts ==
Chart performance for The Music
Chart (2002–2003)	Peak position
Australian Albums (ARIA)	25
French Albums (SNEP)	78
Irish Albums (IRMA)	39
Italian Albums (FIMI)	16
Japanese Albums (Oricon)	20
UK Albums (OCC)	4
US Billboard 200	128

== Certifications ==
Certifications for The Music
Region	Certification	Certified units/sales
Australia (ARIA)	Gold	35,000^{^}
Japan (RIAJ)	Gold	100,000^{^}
^{^} Shipments figures based on certification alone.
