= The Androids =

Australian rock band

- Origin: Australia
- Genres: Rock
- Years active: 2000–present
- Members: Tim Henwood; Matt Tomlinson; Sam Grayson; Marty Grech
- Website: https://theandroidsband.com/

The Androids are an Australian rock band. Fronted by guitarist Tim Henwood (originally from The Superjesus) with members Sam Grayson, Matt Tomlinson and Marty Grech. While their 2002 single, "Do It with Madonna", was commercially their most successful release - peaking at #4 in the Australia ARIA Singles Chart and #15 in the UK Singles Chart; their second and third singles, "Here She Comes" and "Brand New Life" could not replicate "Do It with Madonna"'s success. Their self-titled album debuted and peaked at #36 on the ARIA Albums Chart.

Though not a huge success internationally, they are remembered for the music video for "Do It with Madonna", which featured drag queens dressed as Britney Spears, Christina Aguilera, Pink, Kylie Minogue and Madonna, the song's namesake.

At the ARIA Music Awards of 2003, The Androids won ARIA Award for Best Video for "Do It with Madonna".

The band supported Pink on the Australian leg of her I'm Not Dead Tour in 2007 and the released their second album, Outta Ya Mind.

== Discography ==
=== Albums ===
List of studio albums, with selected chart positions and certifications
Title	Album details	Peak chart positions
Title	Album details	AUS
The Androids	Released: April 7, 2003; Label: Festival Mushroom Records (336232); Formats: CD	36
Outta Ya Mind	Released: 2007; Label: Sony BMG (88697102092); Formats: CD	-

=== Singles ===
List of singles, with selected chart positions and certifications
Title	Year	Peak chart positions				Certifications	Album
Title	Year	AUS	NED	NZ	UK	Certifications	Album
"Do It with Madonna"	2002	4	92	42	15	ARIA: Platinum	The Androids
"Here She Comes"	2003	15	-	-	-		The Androids
"Brand New Life"	2003	101	-	-	-		The Androids
"Whole Lotta Love"	2007	-	-	-	-		Outta Ya Mind

== Awards and nominations ==
=== ARIA Music Awards ===
The ARIA Music Awards are a set of annual ceremonies presented by Australian Recording Industry Association (ARIA), which recognise excellence, innovation, and achievement across all genres of the music of Australia. They commenced in 1987.

Year	Nominee / work	Award	Result	Ref.
2003	"Do It with Madonna"	Highest Selling Single	Nominated	
2003	"Do It with Madonna"	Best Pop Release	Nominated	
2003	Bart Borghesi – The Androids – "Do It with Madonna"	Best Video	Won	
