= The Superjesus =

Australian rock band

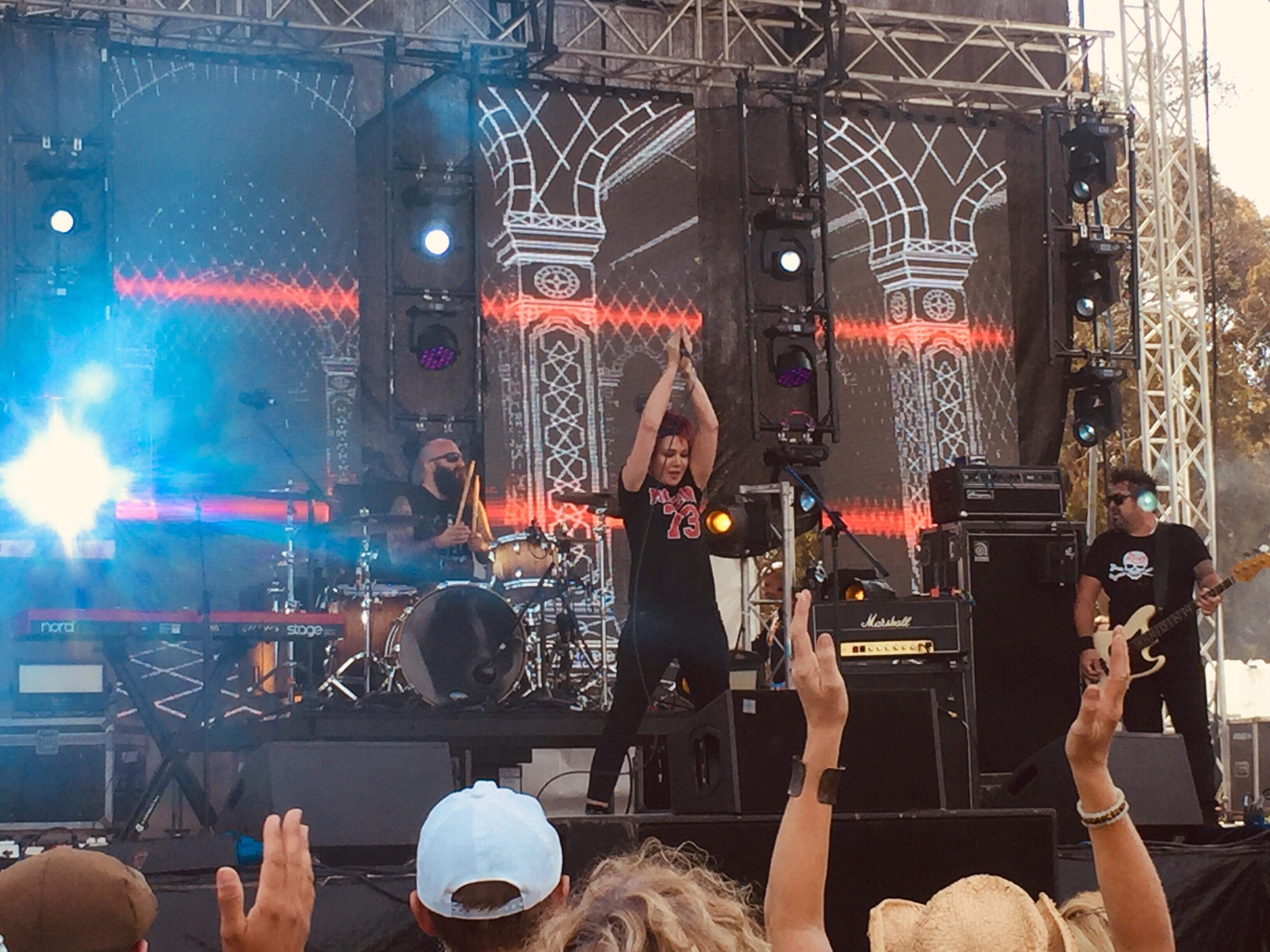
- The Superjesus in 2019

Background information
- Also known as: Hell's Kitchen
- Origin: Adelaide, South Australia, Australia
- Genres: Alternative rock; indie rock
- Years active: 1994–2004; 2013–present
- Labels: Aloha; EastWest/Warner
- Members: Sarah McLeod; Stuart Rudd; Cameron Blokland; Ben Todd
- Past members: Paul Berryman; Tim Henwood; Chris Tennent; Jason Slack; Travis Dragani; Murray Sheridan
- Website: thesuperjesus.com

The Superjesus are an Australian rock band formed in Adelaide in late 1994. Their debut album, Sumo (February 1998), peaked at No. 2 on the ARIA Albums Chart, their second album, Jet Age (October 2000) reached No. 5 and their third album, Rock Music (May 2003) peaked at No. 14. Their top 40 singles include "Down Again" (1997), "Now and Then" (1998), "Gravity" (2000) and "Stick Together" (2003). At the ARIA Music Awards of 1997 they won Best New Talent for Eight Step Rail and Breakthrough Artist – Single for "Shut My Eyes". The group disbanded in mid-2004, and reunited in 2013. The band has undergone multiple line-up changes, with lead vocalist Sarah McLeod and bassist Stuart Rudd serving as mainstays. As of 2024, they are joined by lead guitarist Cam Blokland and drummer Ben Todd.

== History ==
=== Career beginnings: 1994–1996 ===
The Superjesus formed in late 1994 as Hell's Kitchen in Adelaide by Paul Berryman on drums, Sarah McLeod (ex-Fallen Down Monster) on lead vocals and guitar, Stuart Rudd on bass guitar and Chris Tennent on lead guitar. Rudd and Tennent had been jamming together for about a year when Rudd tried out for McLeod's latest band. Tennent was McLeod's guitar teacher at the time and a veteran of the Adelaide music scene, having played in various bands since the 1980s. Paul Berryman successfully auditioned for the group and they started rehearsing for over a year before their first gig.

Hell's Kitchen changed their name to the Superjesus on the eve of the Big Day Out in Adelaide on Australia Day long-weekend, January 1996. Tennent provided the new name. Berryman explained, "It was basically just a piss-take on commonly used words in the '90s. Like The Jesus and Mary Chain, "Jesus Built My Hotrod", the Jesus Lizard, Jesus Jones; there's just heaps of Jesus' out there in the music world so we thought we would have that and super was kind of like a '90s catch word." Their debut five-track extended play, Eight Step Rail, was released in August 1996 on Aloha Records.

=== Career peak: 1997–2004 ===
Eight Step Rail reached the ARIA Singles Chart Top 50 in February 1997. Its feature track, "Shut My Eyes", received high rotation on national youth alternative music radio station, Triple J – it was listed at No. 81 on the station's Hottest 100 for 1996. AllMusic's Jonathan Lewis described how "their wall of guitar noise (somewhat reminiscent of Siamese Dream-era Smashing Pumpkins) made them an overnight success on Australian radio ... McLeod's voice was a major drawcard." Jasper Cooper of Oz Music Project felt that on the EP, "Musically, the band inherited much from contemporaries such as the Smashing Pumpkins, but McLeod's appeal at the band's fore, lent The Superjesus their own niche and stature. The single track 'Shut My Eyes' was the band's tour de force, something that was still unmatched in their latter albums."

They followed with a tour of Australia's east coast, then supported shows by Clouds, Hoodoo Gurus and United Kingdom band, Bush. As songwriters, Tennent typically composed the music and McLeod supplied the lyrics – the pair had also developed a personal relationship. In January 1997 the Superjesus appeared at the Big Day Out and, in April, they travelled to Triclops Sound Studios, Atlanta to record their debut album, Sumo, with Matt Serletic (Collective Soul) producing and Jeff Tomei (Smashing Pumpkins, Hole) as audio engineer. At the ARIA Music Awards of 1997 they won Best New Talent for Eight Step Rail and Breakthrough Artist – Single for "Shut My Eyes". McLeod and Tennent's personal relationship had ended and late that year; he temporarily left the group. Aaron Tokona (of Weta) filled in on guitar when the Superjesus toured New Zealand. Tokona turned down the offer to become a permanent member and remained with Weta.

With Tennent back on board they released Sumo in February 1998 through EastWest/Warner Music Australasia, which peaked at No. 2 on the ARIA Albums Chart and was certified platinum by ARIA for shipment of 70,000 copies. Australian musicologist, Ian McFarlane, described it as "a big sounding album backed by a generous budget." Its local success led to a United States version – with an altered track listing – being issued in June. Lewis felt that they "show that guitar rock with McLeod's vocals soaring over the top is definitely their strength. Unfortunately, it is also their weakness, with Sumo containing too little variation in style." An extended version titled Sumo II, including a bonus seven-track enhanced CD of live performances, was released in October. At the ARIA Music Awards of 1998 Sumo had them nominated for Best Group, Breakthrough Artist – Album and Best Cover Art (artwork by Chris and William Tennent).

In January 1999, they appeared at the Big Day Out, again, and then took a few months off. Chris Tennent left the Superjesus permanently in mid-1999 when they were due to resume. The group relocated to Melbourne in November where they recruited Tim Henwood (ex-Jen Anderson Band, Supermann, Plasticine, Barker) on guitar. Henwood and McLeod became the principal songwriters. The band released their second album, Jet Age, in October 2000, which was produced by Ed Buller (Psychedelic Furs, Suede, Ben Lee) and peaked at No. 5. Louise Buckingham of femail.com.au noticed that the group's "rock engine is winding up and are fuelled to commence take-off down the runway of Australian rock music. With the recent release of blazing new album Jet Age and with the hit-single "Gravity" now a friend to the radio waves, The Superjesus have proved they are keen to move into a new musical era." Amazon.com's editorial reviewer declared that it was an "intelligent, mature, sophisticated" release. At the ARIA Music Awards of 2001, Jet Age was nominated for Best Rock Album and Best Cover Art (Darren Glindemann).

Henwood left in mid-2001 and eventually formed The Androids (he later joined Rogue Traders). McLeod considered disbanding the Superjesus but took up lead guitar while working for their third album as a trio, Rock Music (May 2003), with Marc Waterman producing, which reached No. 14. Patch Brown had replaced Henwood, but due to stylistic differences during recording, he was replaced in turn by Jason Slack, a Slippery Rock Graduate. Tim Cashmere of Undercover felt that "they are just as powerful as before" with McLeod "singing better than ever over her chunkier-than-ever riffs." MediaSearch's Carmine Pascuzzi cautioned that "Those who have been ready to write them off should rethink as Sarah McLeod sings beautifully and the band work in harness efficiently to produce a strong effort. The riffs and tenacity are very much on show... They still have a knack for really rocking out, yet indulging in some slower ballads."

In June 2004, the Superjesus split with Warner Music Australasia as the members took time off to pursue other projects. McLeod worked on a solo album, Beauty Was a Tiger. She then fronted the Sydney-based three-piece band, Screaming Bikini.

=== Reformation, Love and Violence and touring: 2012–2021 ===
On 27 November 2012 McLeod announced on radio station Triple M The Superjesus would reunite for a one-off show on 1 February 2013. Later, McLeod told the Northern Star "We only got back together in 2013 because our drummer [Paul Berryman] came back to Australia from Seattle, so we [bass player Stuart Rudd and lead singer McLeod] thought we could play one single show, see how the crowd responded and, more importantly, how we responded to each other and see if we had some musical chemistry together. The one show was better than we had hoped, crowd-wise and for ourselves." The band, with the line-up of Berryman, Henwood, McLeod and Rudd, played at the Stone Music Festival with Van Halen and Aerosmith in Sydney in April, before embarking on their first national tour in 10 years – The Resurrection Tour – in May and June.

In early 2015 the Superjesus undertook the She Who Rocks Tour sharing the stage with the Baby Animals, fronted by Suze DeMarchi. In June that year the Superjesus released their first single in over a decade, "The Setting Sun". In November they followed with "St. Peters Lane", and embarked on The Setting Sun Tour. In December, Henwood departed to return to The Androids and was replaced with former member, Jason Slack and in April 2016, drummer Paul Berryman departed due to family commitments and residing in the United States. Meanwhile, McLeod traveled to New York City for three months to write new material for a planned fourth album.

In August 2016, the band released an EP, entitled Love and Violence, released through Golden Robot Records. The Superjesus supported the EP with a national tour commencing in October.

In March 2017, The Superjesus were inducted into the South Australian Music Hall of Fame. In 2018, The Superjesus celebrated 20 years of Sumo by re-releasing the album in August with bonus tracks and a national tour.

In January 2019, The Superjesus appeared at the 'Under the Southern Stars' concert tour of five states starting off at Hastings, Victoria, with performances in Tasmania, Queensland, New South Wales and South Australia scheduled throughout January. Appearing with The Superjesus at the Hastings concert were Hoodoo Gurus, Eskimo Joe, You Am I, British India, The Getaway Plan and Scott Darlow. In November, The Superjesus travelled overseas and performed in the South American country of Brazil. The band was also featured and interviewed on a documentary, celebrating the ABC TV Australian music show Recovery, hosted by Dylan Lewis.

=== The Superjesus: 2022-present ===
In September 2022, the band announced a headlining tour for January 2023 in support of a forthcoming new single, 'Money'. The following month, the band confirmed that they would release their fourth studio album in 2023, which is being recorded at Studio 85 in the Blue Mountains and produced by drummer, Murray Sheridan. In December 2022, the band formally inducted lead guitarist Cam Blokland and drummer Murray Sheridan into the line-up.

The Superjesus toured Australia from August through to December 2023, promoting their new single "Lights Out".

On 21 March 2025, the band released their self-titled fourth studio album.

== Band members ==
Current members

- Sarah McLeod – lead vocals, rhythm guitar (1994–2004, 2013–present), lead guitar (2001–2004)
- Stuart Rudd – bass (1994–2004, 2013–present)
- Cameron Blokland – lead guitar (2022–present)
- Ben Todd – drums (2024–present)

Former members

- Chris Tennent – lead guitar (1994–1999, hiatus 1997)
- Paul Berryman – drums (1994–2004, 2013–2016)
- Tim Henwood – lead guitar (1999–2001, 2013–2015)
- Jason Slack – lead guitar (2015–2022; touring 2001–2004)
- Travis Dragani – drums (2016–2022)
- Murray Sheridan – drums (2022–2024)

Former touring musicians

- Aaron Tokona – lead guitar (1997; died 2020)
- Danny Leo – drums (2024)

Timeline

== Discography ==
=== Studio albums ===
List of studio albums, with selected chart positions and certifications
Title	Album details	Peak chart positions	Certifications
Title	Album details	AUS	Certifications
Sumo	Released: February 1998; Label: EastWest (3984204522); Formats: CD	2	ARIA: Platinum
Jet Age	Released: October 2000; Label: EastWest (8573852092); Formats: CD, vinyl	5	ARIA: Platinum
Rock Music	Released: May 2003; Label: EastWest (2564600082); Formats: CD	14	
The Superjesus	Released: 21 March 2025; Label: Bad Valentine Music (BADVAL001); Formats: CD, vinyl, digital	— (Note: The Superjesus did not enter the ARIA top 100 Albums Chart, but peaked at number 10 on the Australian Artists Albums Chart.)	

=== Re-issues ===
List of re-issues, with selected chart positions
Title	Album details	Peak chart positions
Title	Album details	AUS
Sumo II	Released: October 1998; Label: EastWest (3984252612); Formats: CD	34
Sumo 20th Anniversary	Released: 17 August 2018; Label: Warner Music Australasia (5419700727); Formats: CD, vinyl	—
"—" denotes a recording that did not chart or was not released in that territory.

=== Extended plays ===
List of extended plays, with selected chart positions
Title	Album details	Peak chart positions
Title	Album details	AUS
Eight Step Rail	Released: May 1996; Label: Aloha (0630160722); Formats: CD	47
Love and Violence	Released: 12 August 2016; Label: Golden Robot (GOLDRR007); Formats: digital download, CD, streaming	—
"—" denotes a recording that did not chart or was not released in that territory.

=== Singles ===
List of singles, with selected chart positions and certifications
Title	Year	Peak chart positions	Certifications	Album
Title	Year	AUS	Certifications	Album
"Down Again"	1997	23	ARIA: Gold	Sumo
"Saturation"	1997	42		Sumo
"Now and Then"	1998	40		Sumo
"Ashes"	1998	66		Sumo
"Gravity"	2000	35		Jet Age
"Secret Agent Man"	2001	43		Jet Age
"Enough to Know"	2001	42		Jet Age
"Second Sun"	2002	107		Jet Age
"Stick Together"	2003	35		Rock Music
"Over and Out"	2003	53		Rock Music
"So Lonely"	2004	45		Rock Music
"The Setting Sun"	2015	—		Love and Violence
"St. Peters Lane"	2015	—		Love and Violence
"Love and Violence"	2016	—		Love and Violence
"The Impossible"	2019	—		Non-album single
"Money (We're Only in It for Love)"	2023	—		The Superjesus
"Lights Out"	2023	—		The Superjesus
"Dancing with Myself"	2023	—		The Superjesus
"We Won't Let Go Until It's Over"	2024	—		The Superjesus
"Something Good" (solo or with The Journey)	2024	—		The Superjesus
"Diamonds"	2025	—		The Superjesus
"—" denotes a recording that did not chart or was not released in that territory.

== Awards and nominations ==
=== AIR Awards ===
The Australian Independent Record Awards (commonly known informally as AIR Awards) is an annual awards night to recognise, promote and celebrate the success of Australia's Independent Music sector.

Year	Nominee / work	Award	Result	Ref.
2026	"Something Good" (with The Journey)	Best Independent Electronic Single	Nominated	

=== ARIA Music Awards ===
The ARIA Music Awards is an annual awards ceremony that recognises excellence, innovation, and achievement across all genres of Australian music. The Superjesus won 3 awards from 8 nominations.

Year	Nominee / work	Award	Result
1997	Eight Step Rail	Best New Talent	Won
1997	Eight Step Rail	Breakthrough Artist – Single	Won
1998	Sumo	Best Group	Nominated
1998	Sumo	Breakthrough Artist - Album	Nominated
1998	Sumo	Best Cover Art	Nominated
1998	Sumo	Best Rock Album	Won
2001	Jet Age	Best Rock Album	Nominated
2001	Jet Age	Best Cover Art	Nominated

=== South Australian Music Awards ===
The South Australian Music Awards are annual awards that exist to recognise, promote and celebrate excellence in the South Australian contemporary music industry. They commenced in 2012.

Year	Nominee / work	Award	Result
2017	The Superjesus	Hall of Fame	inductee
