= Sarah McLeod (musician) =

Australian singer (born 1973)

- Sarah McLeod in 2013

Background information
- Born: Sarah Yvette McLeod; 1 February 1973 (age 53); Adelaide, South Australia, Australia
- Genres: Indie rock; alternative rock; post-grunge; rock; piano
- Instruments: Vocals, guitar, piano.
- Years active: 1994–present
- Labels: Golden Robot Records; Festival Mushroom; Naughty Mouse Ink; Sony BMG Australia; Roustabout
- Website: sarahmcleodofficial.com

Sarah Yvette McLeod (born 1 February 1973) is an Australian singer-songwriter known both for her solo work and as the singer/guitarist of rock band The Superjesus.

McLeod's first solo release, Beauty Was a Tiger, was released in September 2005 and peaked in the top 40 on the ARIA Albums Chart. The album's first single, "Private School Kid"—a duet with The Living End's Chris Cheney—also reached the top 40, on the related ARIA Singles Chart in July 2005.

== Early life and family ==
Sarah Yvette McLeod, was born on 1 February 1973, to parents Don and Rosemary. She grew up in Adelaide with her older sister Leah McLeod (born 1971), a former television presenter.

McLeod attended St Peter's Collegiate Girls' School and began singing in her late teens. In 1990, she commenced a university course, undertaking a Bachelor of Arts at Flinders University in Adelaide. 3 months into the course she went on a holiday with friends to Bali, where she was invited to join a Balinese band. She enjoyed playing on stage and performed with the band every night during her visit. McLeod later remembered "I could already play a bit of guitar by then but did little more than sing and play to my buddies at home." Upon her return to Adelaide, armed with a new passion for performing, she quit university and formed her first group, Fallen Down Monster. She displayed her vocal and guitar skills, and fun-loving, energetic stage presence. Fallen Down Monster performed indie band covers, and McLeod wrote original tracks which were not recorded.

== Career ==
=== The Superjesus ===
Late in 1994 she joined Chris Tennent to form an indie guitar rock band, Hell's Kitchen, which later became The Superjesus. Australian musicologist Ian McFarlane described McLeod's "captivating voice and melodic rhythm guitar." In May 1996 the group issued their debut four-track extended play, Eight Step Rail, with all the tracks co-written by McLeod with her bandmates. Jonathan Lewis of AllMusic noticed McLeod's singing: "Sounding like a cross between Liz Phair and Catatonia's Cerys Matthews, McLeod's voice was a major drawcard; strong, confident and rarely lapsing into the girlishness that characterized some of The Superjesus' contemporaries."

At the ARIA Music Awards of 1997 the Superjesus won Best New Talent and Breakthrough Artist – Single for Eight Step Rail. Then released their first full-length album, Sumo (June 1998). The group released two more albums, Jet Age (October 2000) and Rock Music (May 2003), before they split in 2004.

=== First album: Beauty Was a Tiger ===
In 2005, McLeod launched her solo career, she signed with Festival Mushroom Records, releasing her first single, "Let's Get Together", in May. Her debut solo album, Beauty Was a Tiger, followed in September that year; it was co-produced by McLeod with Matt Lovell. All the tracks on the album were written either by McLeod or with Chris Peters, bass player from the Detroit band, Electric Six. It peaked at No. 31 on the ARIA Albums Chart. For touring her backing band, the Black Diamond Express, consisted of Patch Brown (guitar), Grant Fitzpatrick (bass guitar), Stu Hunter (keyboards) and Mick Skelton (drums).

Following the release of another single, "Private School Kid" (July 2005) – a duet with Chris Cheney from The Living End – McLeod parted ways with Mushroom Festival Records. It peaked at No. 33 on the ARIA Singles Chart. During 2006 she released two more singles, "All But Gone" as an independent EP, and "He Doesn't Love You"; both included remixes.

=== Live & Acoustic ===
During 2006 McLeod performed acoustic gigs with drummer Mick Skelton, which led to an Australian tour, playing tracks from Beauty Was a Tiger, some Superjesus material and several cover versions. This resulted in the release of the live album Live & Acoustic.

=== Madness ===
In October 2006, the Hook n Sling remix of "He Doesn't Love You" reached No. 1 on the ARIA Club Charts. It was also released in the United Kingdom and the United States. She spent much of 2007 and 2008 first travelling in the US and then living in London, where she recorded songs for various projects. In November 2009 she released a single, "Tell Your Story Walking".

In 2009, McLeod posted further material including "Love to Last". In August 2010 she released a single, "Double R", with remixes by John Roman, Autoerotique and Grandtheft. It was followed by a cover of Bruce Springsteen's "Dancing in the Dark". Her third album, Madness, appeared in November that year, which included both "Double R" and "Dancing in the Dark".

=== Screaming Bikini ===
McLeod, using the pseudonym Sammie Scream, started a new group, Screaming Bikini, featuring KJ from The Art, which issued a single, "Easy", followed by their debut self-titled album in May 2011. "Dirty Beats/ Disco Bass" and "Dancing Alone" were also released as singles.

=== The Superjesus reformation and 96% Love Song Book ===
From November 2012, the Superjesus reunited, initially for a concert in Adelaide in the following February; it was followed by an Australian tour in May and June 2013. In 2013 McLeod released an EP, 96% Love Song Book, under her own name. It was influenced by her love of 1950s and 1960s music and included an a cappella, barbershop quartet track, "The Greatest Pretender". In 2014 McLeod and Jeff Martin (of the Tea Party) released a duet single, "Man the Life Boats"; they toured Australia to promote it. This collaboration was followed by a Tea Party / The Superjesus national tour in 2014.

In 2015, The Superjesus teamed up with Baby Animals for a co-headlining tour, She Who Rocks, during May to June.

The Superjesus issued their first single in 12 years, "The Setting Sun", in June 2015. They followed this with the Love and Violence EP, released in 2016.

=== 2017 onwards ===
McLeod's 2017 album, Rocky's Diner showed a departure from the familiar rock persona by exhibiting her song writing versatility.

In 2018, McLeod launched her own lifestyle clothing line, Bad Valentine, describing the brand as being, “dedicated to the celebration of self confidence, empowerment and freedom of speech.”

In September 2018, McLeod joined Scott Darlow, Adam Brand, Jack Jones and Todd Hunter to re-record Dragon's "Rain" with all net proceeds from the sale to go towards to the Buy-a-bale program in support of Australian farmers suffering from the Australian drought.

== Discography ==
=== Albums ===
List of studio albums, with selected chart positions and certifications
Title	Album details	Peak chart positions
Title	Album details	AUS
Beauty Was a Tiger	Released: 19 September 2005; Label: Naughty Mouse Ink / Festival Mushroom, Sony BMG Australia; Format: CD, digital download	31
Live & Acoustic	Released: December 2006; Label: Naughty Mouse Ink; Format: CD	—
Madness	Released: 22 November 2010; Label: Roustabout, Universal Music Australia; Format: CD	—
Rocky's Diner	Released: 18 August 2017; Label: Revolution; Format: CD, digital download	20

=== Extended plays ===
List of extended plays, with selected details
Title	Extended play details
Untitled	Released: 3 December 2010; Label: Roustabout Records; Formats: Digital download
96% Love Song Book	Released: 24 February 2013

=== Singles ===
Year	Song	AUS	AUS Club	HUN	HUN Dance	Album
2005	"Let's Get Together"	—	—	—	—	Beauty Was a Tiger
2005	"Private School Kid" (featuring Chris Cheney)	33	—	—	—	Beauty Was a Tiger
2006	"All But Gone"	—	—	—	—	Beauty Was a Tiger
2006	"He Doesn't Love You"	99	1	2	1	Beauty Was a Tiger
2008	'"He Doesn't Love You '08 (Náksi vs. Brunner Remix)"	—	—	—	9	Non-album single
2009	"Tell Your Story Walking"	—	—	—	—	Non-album single
2010	"White Horse"	—	—	—	—	Untitled EP
2010	"Double R"	—	—	—	—	Madness
2010	"Dancing in the Dark"	—	—	—	—	Madness
2011	"Love & Honour"	—	12	—	—	Madness
2011	"Falling Out of Love"(EDX feat Sarah McLeod)	—	—	—	—	Non-album single
2012	"The Real Thing" (I Am Sam feat Sarah McLeod)	—	—	—	—	Non-album single
2013	"Hurricane" (Dzeko & Torres feat Sarah McLeod)	—	—	—	—	Non-album single
2013	"Magik" (Patrick Hagenaar feat Sarah McLeod)	—	—	—	—	Non-album single
2014	"Man the Life Boats" (by Sarah McLeod and Jeff Martin)	—	—	—	—	Non-album single
2014	"Scouts Honour"	—	—	—	—	96% Love Song Book

=== Charity singles ===
List of charity singles
Title	Year	Peak chart positions	Notes
Title	Year	AUS	Notes
"I Touch Myself" (as part of the I Touch Myself Project)	2014	72	The I Touch Myself Project launched in 2014 with a mission to encourage young women to touch themselves regularly to find early signs of cancer.
"Rain" (as part of The Drought Breakers)	2018	—	All net proceeds from the sale to go towards to the Buy-a-bale program in support of Australian farmers suffering from the Australian drought.
