= Now That's What I Call Music! Number 1's =

Now That's What I Call Music! #1's

Compilation album by Various artists
- Released: January 24, 2006
- Length: 74:33
- Label: UTV Records

Series chronology
Now That's What I Call Music! 20 (2005)	Now That's What I Call Music! #1's (2006)	Now Esto Es Musica! Latino (2006)

Professional ratings
Review scores
Source	Rating
Allmusic	link

Now That's What I Call Music! #1's is a special edition of the Now! series released in the United States on January 24, 2006. It includes 20 tracks that were released on previous editions of the Now! series.

Now! #1's reached number six on the Billboard 200 albums chart and was certified Gold by the RIAA.

On May 4, 2015, an updated version of the compilation was released, featuring hits from 2006–2015.

== Track listing ==
No.	Title	Artist	Length
1.	"Hot in Herre" (from Now! 11)	Nelly	3:48
2.	"Hey Ya!" (from Now! 16)	Outkast	3:53
3.	"Hollaback Girl" (from Now! 19)	Gwen Stefani	3:18
4.	"Survivor" (from Now! 7)	Destiny's Child	4:00
5.	"Love Don't Cost a Thing" (from Now! 6)	Jennifer Lopez	3:40
6.	"All for You" (from Now! 7)	Janet Jackson	4:21
7.	"Bye Bye Bye" (from Now! 6)	*NSYNC	3:17
8.	"...Baby One More Time" (from Now! 2)	Britney Spears	3:29
9.	"Bump, Bump, Bump" (from Now! 12)	B2K featuring P. Diddy	3:52
10.	"I Try" (from Now! 4)	Macy Gray	3:54
11.	"I Knew I Loved You" (from Now! 4)	Savage Garden	4:08
12.	"Pieces of Me" (from Now! 17)	Ashlee Simpson	3:35
13.	"Again" (from Now! 6)	Lenny Kravitz	3:45
14.	"All Star" (from Now! 3)	Smash Mouth	3:19
15.	"Absolutely (Story of a Girl)" (from Now! 5)	Nine Days	3:11
16.	"Kryptonite" (from Now! 5)	3 Doors Down	3:53
17.	"How You Remind Me" (from Now! 10)	Nickelback	3:42
18.	"With Arms Wide Open" (from Now! 6)	Creed	3:53
19.	"Hanging by a Moment" (from Now! 7)	Lifehouse	3:33
20.	"The Reason" (from Now! 16)	Hoobastank	3:50

== Charts ==
=== Weekly charts ===
Chart (2006)	Peak position
US Billboard 200	6

=== Year-end charts ===
Chart (2006)	Position
US Billboard 200	132
