= List of Billboard 200 number-one albums of 2005 =

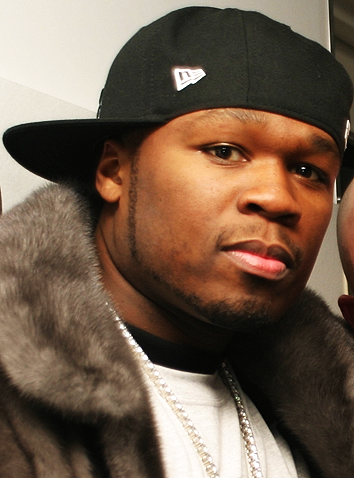
The Massacre by 50 Cent was the 2nd best-selling album of 2005.

The highest-selling albums and EPs in the United States are ranked in the Billboard 200, published by Billboard magazine. The data are compiled by Nielsen Soundscan based on each album's weekly physical and digital sales. In 2005, 34 albums advanced to the peak position in 53 issues of the magazine.

Mariah Carey's comeback album, The Emancipation of Mimi, sold the most copies in the United States, accumulating 4.866 million units in sale by the end of 2005. She became the first female recording artist to have topped the year-end chart since Alanis Morissette's Jagged Little Pill in 1996. The Emancipation of Mimi is Carey's first chart topper since she reached the summit of the Billboard 200 in 1997 with Butterfly. 50 Cent's The Massacre sold a total of 4.834 million units, only 32,000 copies behind The Emancipation of Mimi, becoming the second best-selling album of the year.

The Massacre spent six consecutive weeks atop the Billboard 200, making it the longest-running number-one album of 2005. The album sold 1.14 million copies in its debut week, the biggest first-week figure in 2005. Coldplay's X&Y stayed at the top for three straight weeks; it gave the band their first number-one album. Coldplay is the only non-American act to have topped the Billboard 200 for an extended chart run since Shania Twain had a five-week reign with Up!, and the only British act with the longest stay at number one since The Beatles in 2000–2001.

2Pac's Loyal to the Game reached the top spot in the first issue of the chart, making it his third posthumous number-one album and his fifth chart topper. Another posthumous chart topper was Ray Charles' Genius Loves Company, which was released three months after his death. The album won Album of the Year at the 2005 Grammy Awards, spurring massive increase of sales. This gave Charles his first number-one album in more than four decades of his career.

== Chart history ==
Key
†	Indicates best performing album of 2005

Issue date	Album	Artist(s)	Label	Sales	Ref.
January 1	Loyal to the Game	2Pac	Amaru	330,000	
January 8	Encore	Eminem	Shady	430,000	
January 15	Encore	Eminem	Shady	198,000	
January 22	American Idiot	Green Day	Reprise	100,000	
January 29	American Idiot	Green Day	Reprise	100,000	
February 5	The Documentary	The Game	Aftermath	587,000	
February 12	Be as You Are (Songs from an Old Blue Chair)	Kenny Chesney	BNA	311,000	
February 19	The Documentary	The Game	Aftermath	198,000	
February 26	Seventeen Days	3 Doors Down	Republic	231,000	
March 5	Genius Loves Company	Ray Charles	Concord	224,000	
March 12	O	Omarion	Sony Urban Music/Epic	182,000	
March 19	The Massacre †	50 Cent	Shady/Aftermath	1,140,000	
March 26	The Massacre †	50 Cent	Shady/Aftermath	771,000	
April 2	The Massacre †	50 Cent	Shady/Aftermath	364,000	
April 9	The Massacre †	50 Cent	Shady/Aftermath	329,000	
April 16	The Massacre †	50 Cent	Shady/Aftermath	211,000	
April 23	The Massacre †	50 Cent	Shady/Aftermath	165,000	
April 30	The Emancipation of Mimi	Mariah Carey	Island	404,000	
May 7	...Something to Be	Rob Thomas	Melisma/Atlantic	252,000	
May 14	Devils & Dust	Bruce Springsteen	Columbia	222,000	
May 21	With Teeth	Nine Inch Nails	Nothing/Interscope	272,000	
May 28	Stand Up	Dave Matthews Band	RCA	465,000	
June 4	Mezmerize	System of a Down	American/Columbia	453,000	
June 11	Out of Exile	Audioslave	Epic	263,000	
June 18	The Emancipation of Mimi	Mariah Carey	Island	172,000	
June 25	X&Y	Coldplay	Capitol	737,000	
July 2	X&Y	Coldplay	Capitol	323,000	
July 9	X&Y	Coldplay	Capitol	181,000	
July 16	Somewhere Down in Texas	George Strait	MCA Nashville	245,000	
July 23	TP-3: Reloaded	R. Kelly	Jive	491,000	
July 30	TP-3: Reloaded	R. Kelly	Jive	139,000	
August 6	Now 19	Various Artists	EMI Group/Universal/Sony BMG/Zomba	436,000	
August 13	Now 19	Various Artists	EMI Group/Universal/Sony BMG/Zomba	236,000	
August 20	Fireflies	Faith Hill	Warner Bros. Nashville	329,000	
August 27	Chapter V	Staind	Flip/Atlantic	185,000	
September 3	Most Wanted	Hilary Duff	Hollywood	208,000	
September 10	Most Wanted	Hilary Duff	Hollywood	101,000	
September 17	Late Registration	Kanye West	Roc-A-Fella/Def Jam	860,000	
September 24	Late Registration	Kanye West	Roc-A-Fella/Def Jam	283,000	
October 1	The Peoples Champ	Paul Wall	Swishahouse/Atlantic	176,000	
October 8	Ten Thousand Fists	Disturbed	Reprise	239,000	
October 15	All Jacked Up	Gretchen Wilson	Epic Nashville	264,000	
October 22	All the Right Reasons	Nickelback	Roadrunner	317,000	
October 29	Unplugged	Alicia Keys	J	196,000	
November 5	I Am Me	Ashlee Simpson	Geffen	220,000	
November 12	#1's	Destiny's Child	Columbia	113,000	
November 19	Now 20	Various Artists	Sony BMG/Zomba/EMI	378,000	
November 26	The Road and the Radio	Kenny Chesney	BNA	470,000	
December 3	Confessions on a Dance Floor	Madonna	Warner Bros.	350,000	
December 10	Hypnotize	System of a Down	American/Columbia	320,000	
December 17	Now 20	Various Artists	Sony BMG/Zomba/EMI	158,000	
December 24	Curtain Call: The Hits	Eminem	Shady/Aftermath/Interscope	441,000	
December 31	Curtain Call: The Hits	Eminem	Shady/Aftermath/Interscope	323,700	

== See also ==
- 2005 in music
- List of number-one albums (United States)
