= Now That's What I Call Music! 12 =

Now That's What I Call Music! 12 may refer to:

- Now That's What I Call Music 12 (UK series) (original UK series, 1988 release)
- Now That's What I Call Music! 12 (U.S. series) (U.S. series, 2003 release)
