= Now That's What I Call Music! 13 =

Now That's What I Call Music! 13 may refer to both "Now That's What I Call Music!"-series albums, including

- Now That's What I Call Music XIII (original UK series, 1988 release)
- Now That's What I Call Music! 13 (U.S. series, 2003 release)
