= Now That's What I Call Music! 6 =

Now That's What I Call Music! 6 refers to at least three different "Now That's What I Call Music!"-series albums, including

- Now That's What I Call Music 6 (UK series), 1985
- Now That's What I Call Music! 6 (American series), 2001
- Now 6 Australian series 2004 release
