= Now That's What I Call Music! 19 =

Now That's What I Call Music! 19 may refer to two different "Now That's What I Call Music!" series albums, including

- Now! That's What I Call Music 19 (original UK series, 1991 release)
- Now That's What I Call Music! 19 (U.S. series, 2005 release)
