= Now That's What I Call Music! 14 =

Now That's What I Call Music! 14 may refer to at least two different "Now That's What I Call Music!"-series albums, including

- Now That's What I Call Music 14 (original UK series, 1989 release)
- Now That's What I Call Music! 14 (U.S. series, 2003 release)
