= Now That's What I Call Music! 20 =

Now That's What I Call Music! 20 may refer to at least two different Now That's What I Call Music!-series albums, including

- Now That's What I Call Music! 20 (UK series), released on 30 November 1991
- Now That's What I Call Music! 20 (U.S. series), released on November 1, 2005
