= Now That's What I Call Music! 10 =

Now That's What I Call Music! 10 may refer to at least two different "Now That's What I Call Music!" series albums, including:

- Now That's What I Call Music 10 (UK series), released in 1987
- Now That's What I Call Music! 10 (U.S. series), released in 2002
