= Now That's What I Call Music! 7 =

Now That's What I Call Music! 7 or Now 7 may refer to at least three different "Now That's What I Call Music!"-series albums, including

- Now That's What I Call Music 7 (original UK series, 1986 release)
- Now That's What I Call Music! 7 (U.S. series, 2001 release)
- Now 07 (Australian series)
