= Jade Anderson =

British singer-songwriter from the 2000s

- Born: London, England
- Occupation: Singer-songwriter
- Years active: 2001–2003
- Father: Jon Anderson
- Relatives: Deborah Anderson (sister)
- Musical career
- Genres: Pop; R&B; rock
- Instrument: Vocals
- Label: Columbia

Jade Anderson is an English singer-songwriter, born in London as the youngest daughter of former Yes frontman Jon Anderson. After a childhood during which she met and performed with the famous musicians, she moved out at age 16 to live with friends and work on her own music.

In 2002, she released her debut and the best-known single, "Sugarhigh," which drew critical praise and became a minor chart hit in the United States, peaking within the top 40 of that country's dance chart and giving Anderson her first Hot 100 entry. It also gave Anderson a top 100 hit in the Netherlands. Later that year, she released her debut studio album, Dive Deeper, on Columbia Records, and toured to promote it.

== Early life ==
Anderson was born in London as the youngest daughter of vocalist Jon Anderson, the frontman of progressive-rock band Yes. She performed "Jingle Bells" on her father's 1985 Christmas album, 3 Ships.

Anderson recalled performing with Ringo Starr when she was 8 years old, at her father's urging. She told Billboard that growing up with a celebrity father, she was exposed to many different kinds of people, which fostered in her a sense of openness.

At the age of 16, Anderson left home and moved in with some friends in public housing in London; the same year, she joined a "female teen pop group." She also began writing poetry at this time; she retrospectively described it as "a way of [...] dealing with all the confusion of being a teenager." Anderson eventually left the pop group and began collaborating with Eg White (also known as, simply, "Eg"), a London songwriter.

== Career ==
In 2002, Anderson released her debut studio album, Dive Deeper, on Columbia Records. She had recorded the album with White in her basement, and it was produced at his London studio. Anderson wrote and recorded the album, and then was signed to Columbia, reportedly without her father's involvement. The album was initially slated to be released in Fall 2001, but its release was delayed, and it eventually came out on 14 May 2002. Stylistically, the record was noted for its mixture of ballads and dance-oriented songs, its extensive use of keyboards, and its Spanish influence. It has been classified as rock, pop, and pop-soul. The song "Constant Talking" criticizes gossip and is interspersed with the chattering voices; it was thematically compared by AllMusic to The Go-Go's "Our Lips are Sealed". The song "Sweet Memories" (sometimes called "Sunset Memories"), meanwhile, used a rhythm guitar instead of keyboards. In March 2002, it was announced that Anderson would soon embark on a tour to promote the album.

Anderson's biggest and only charting single, "Sugarhigh," reached the Billboard Hot 100 and the Dutch Singles Chart and was featured on several pop and dance compilations, including Now That's What I Call Music! 10. Her second single, "Sweet Memories", received a favorable critical evaluation, but failed to impact the charts, which "Sugarhigh" had entered.

== Vocals ==
Anderson has been noted for her vocal performance, which Vibe described as an "exquisite soprano." Her voice has also been noted for its "noticeable lisp," which AllMusic suggested might be "a marketing point to set her apart."

== Discography ==
=== Studio album ===
Title	Details
Dive Deeper	Released: 14 May 2002; Label: Columbia; Formats: CD; Track listing: 1. Intro; 2. Sugarhigh; 3. Constant Talking; 4. Love Without Gold; 5. Down; 6. Falling; 7. Sweet Memories; 8. Forbidden Fruit; 9. For Your Lessons; 10. Nothing More; 11. Before It Starts Again; 12. Dive Deeper; 13. Who's Loving You Now?; 14. What I'd Do; 15. You Held Me

=== Singles ===
Title	Year	Peak chart positions			Album
Title	Year	US	US Dance	NL	Album
"Sugarhigh"	2002	96	37	85	Dive Deeper
"Sweetest Memories"	2002	—	—	—	Dive Deeper

== See also ==
- Deborah Anderson (sister)
