= Now That's What I Call Music! (original U.S. album) =

Compilation album by various artists
- Released: October 27, 1998
- Length: 68:42
- Label: Virgin

Series chronology
Now That's What I Call Music! (1998)	Now That's What I Call Music! 2 (1999)

Professional ratings
Review scores
Source	Rating
AllMusic	2.5/5 stars

Now That's What I Call Music! (simply titled NOW) was released on October 27, 1998. Modeled after the highly successful Now That's What I Call Music! series in the United Kingdom, which compiles a number of songs that are popular around the time of its release, this album is the first edition of the Now! series in the United States.

In following the success of its UK predecessors, this first U.S. version of Now! reached platinum status as certified by the RIAA. The compilation includes three songs that reached number one on the Billboard Hot 100: "Together Again, "All My Life" and "MMMBop". The album peaked at number 10 on the Billboard 200 in January 1999.

== Track listing ==
No.	Title	Artist	Length
1.	"Together Again"	Janet Jackson	5:01
2.	"As Long as You Love Me"	Backstreet Boys	3:32
3.	"The Way"	Fastball	4:16
4.	"Flagpole Sitta"	Harvey Danger	3:35
5.	"Say You'll Be There"	Spice Girls	3:56
6.	"All My Life"	K-Ci & JoJo	5:31
7.	"Never Ever" (Single Edit)	All Saints	4:54
8.	"If You Could Only See"	Tonic	4:21
9.	"MMMBop"	Hanson	4:27
10.	"Zoot Suit Riot"	Cherry Poppin' Daddies	3:53
11.	"Shorty (You Keep Playin' with My Mind)"	Imajin	4:14
12.	"Anytime"	Brian McKnight	4:31
13.	"Barbie Girl"	Aqua	3:16
14.	"Karma Police"	Radiohead	4:21
15.	"I Will Buy You a New Life"	Everclear	3:58
16.	"Fly Away"	Lenny Kravitz	3:41
17.	"Sex & Candy"	Marcy Playground	2:52

== Charts ==
=== Weekly charts ===
Chart (1999)	Peak position
US Billboard 200	10

=== Year-end charts ===
Chart (1999)	Position
US Billboard 200	47
