= Number 1's (Destiny's Child album) =

#1's

Greatest hits album by Destiny's Child
- Released: October 21, 2005
- Recorded: 1997–2005
- Studios: 24/7 (Houston); 2nd Floor (Orlando); 353 (New York); Cash Money (New Orleans); Chartmaker (Malibu); Chase (Atlanta); DARP (Atlanta); Digital Services (Houston); The Enterprise (Burbank); Fox (Los Angeles); Henson (Los Angeles); Lobo (Babylon); Pacifique (Los Angeles); Record Plant (Los Angeles); Silent Sound (Atlanta); Sony (New York); Sound on Sound (New York); SugarHill (Houston); TK (Honolulu); Triangle Sound (Atlanta)
- Genres: R&B; pop
- Length: 60:22
- Labels: Columbia; Music World; Sony Urban
- Producers: 9th Wonder; Jovonn Alexander; Kevin "She'kspere" Briggs; Anthony Dent; Jerry Duplessis; Chad Elliot; Mark J. Feist; David Foster; Rob Fusari; Humberto Gatica; Che Greene; Rich Harrison; Wyclef Jean; Rodney Jerkins; Beyoncé Knowles; Mathew Knowles; Falonte Moore; Poke and Tone; Ric Rude; Cory Rooney; Swizz Beatz

Destiny's Child chronology
Destiny Fulfilled (2004)	#1's (2005)	Live in Atlanta (2006)

Singles from #1's
- 1. "Stand Up for Love" Released: September 27, 2005; 2. "Check on It" Released: December 13, 2005

#1's is the first greatest hits album by American girl group Destiny's Child. It was released on October 21, 2005, by Columbia Records, Music World Entertainment and Sony Urban Music.

Following a two-year hiatus during which each member released solo albums to varying levels of success, Destiny's Child reunited during the summer of 2004 to record their fifth and final studio album Destiny Fulfilled, which was released that November to widespread commercial success. To further promote the album, the group embarked on the world tour Destiny Fulfilled... and Lovin' It in April 2005. During its Barcelona show on June 11, Kelly Rowland announced the group's disbandment for after the tour's conclusion. However, before formally disbanding, they decided to release #1's, featuring their highest-charting singles alongside three new tracks.

Upon its release, #1's received generally positive reviews from music critics, who praised the included material as the highlights of the group's career. However, its title was dismissed by media outlets as most of the tracks had not reached the summit of a major record chart; Billboard later acknowledged the title as solely a marketing strategy. A commercial success, the compilation debuted atop the US Billboard 200 with first-week sales of 113,000 units, becoming the group's second number-one album. Briefly after its release, the album was certified platinum by the Recording Industry Association of America (RIAA). It also peaked at number one in Japan.

#1's produced two singles. "Stand Up for Love" was termed "2005 World Children's Day Anthem" but was a critical and commercial failure, charting solely in South Korea nine years after its release. "Check on It"–Beyoncé's collaboration with Slim Thug–peaked atop the US Billboard Hot 100, becoming Beyoncé's third solo number-one single, and within the top ten in 13 additional countries. Following the conclusion of promotional activities for #1's and the release of the video album Live in Atlanta, Destiny's Child formally disbanded in March 2006.

== Background ==
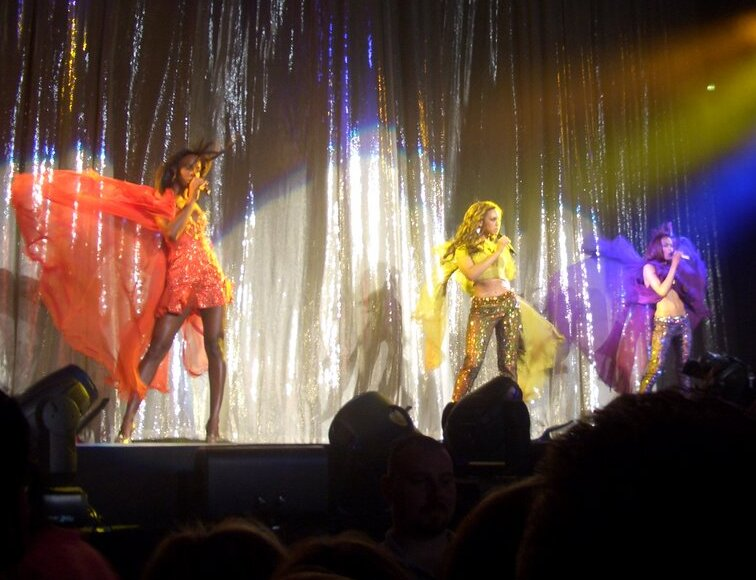
Destiny's Child performing "Say My Name" during their Destiny Fulfilled... and Lovin' It tour in May 2005

Following the conclusion of promotional activities for their third studio album Survivor (2001), Destiny's Child embarked on a two-year hiatus, which allowed each member to release solo albums. As each member achieved success with individual projects, speculations arose over the group's disbandment. However, Beyoncé, Kelly Rowland and Michelle Williams reunited during the summer of 2004 to work on their fifth studio album Destiny Fulfilled. The album was released in November 2004, peaking at number two on the US Billboard 200 and being certified triple platinum by the Recording Industry Association of America (RIAA). Its singles "Lose My Breath" and "Soldier" both peaked at number three on the US Billboard Hot 100 and achieved global commercial success.

To further promote Destiny Fulfilled, Destiny's Child embarked on the world tour Destiny Fulfilled... and Lovin' It in April 2005. During the concert at the Palau Sant Jordi in Barcelona, Spain on June 11, Rowland announced that the tour would be the group's final, revealing their formal disbandment. It was announced that after the North American leg, the group would part ways, with each member continuing their music career as a solo artist. During an interview, they explained that their disbandment had been planned while recording Destiny Fulfilled as they discussed their individual aspirations and realized that remaining a group would prevent them from pursuing those interests.

== Music and lyrics ==
#1's is predominantly an R&B and pop record. Sputnikmusic's John Hanson further described it as "filled" with R&B and bubblegum pop, while also noting a presence of neo soul. In addition to highest-charting singles from Destiny's Child's eponymous debut studio album (1998), The Writing's on the Wall (1999), Survivor (2001) and Destiny Fulfilled (2004), the album included three new tracks–"Stand Up for Love", Beyoncé's "Check on It" featuring Slim Thug, and "Feel the Same Way I Do". The adult contemporary-styled ballad "Stand Up for Love" was inspired by poverty-stricken children and families receiving funds from charitable organizations. Lyrically, the song encourages unity.

On "Check on It", Slim Thug raps his lines backed by a bassline while Beyoncé's vocals, further described as "R&B pipes" by Bret McCabe from the Baltimore City Paper, received comparisons to Donna Summer. Quick hooks are sung by Beyoncé against a dance beat. The song lyrically takes place at a nightclub, with the female protagonist letting the male patrons know they are welcome to look at her body while she is dancing. "Feel the Same Way I Do" was described as a similar to soul songs by American girl group The Supremes, instrumentally complete with "exotic" strings. Jess Harvell from Pitchfork felt its sound was suitable for Mariah Carey's The Emancipation of Mimi (2005). Its lyrical theme revolves around a woman who develops romantic feelings for a man with whom she has had a solely sexual relationship.

== Marketing ==
On August 1, 2005, Kelly Rowland announced the release of Destiny's Child's first greatest hits album later that year during an interview with Billboard, adding: "We're definitely going to record another song for our greatest hits album for our fans. We're still thinking about it because we want it to mean something." In September, Destiny's Child's #1's was revealed as the album's title, along with a release date of October 25; the title was subsequently shortened to #1's. Following the announcement, Billboard questioned the criteria by which the inclusion of the songs would be determined, as the group had only four US Billboard Hot 100 number-ones–"Bills, Bills, Bills", "Say My Name", "Independent Women Part I" and "Bootylicious"–with "No, No, No" being a Hot R&B/Hip-Hop Songs number-one. "Lose My Breath", "Soldier" featuring T.I and Lil Wayne, and "Jumpin', Jumpin'" additionally topped other component Billboard charts; the former two peaked atop the Dance Club Songs while the latter peaked atop the Mainstream Top 40. Furthermore, "Survivor" reached the summit in Ireland, Norway and the United Kingdom, as well as on the US Dance Singles Sales and Rhythmic charts. However, Keith Caulfield of Billboard later acknowledged its title as a marketing strategy, as the album's liner notes did not offer information on its tracks' chart positions. Following the release of #1's, its second single "Check on It" peaked atop the US Billboard Hot 100, becoming the album's fifth actual number-one.

The cover artwork for #1's was designed by Fusako Chubachi. It features images of each member, photographed by Robert Erdmann, positioned abreast. Beyoncé's image was used for international CD single pressings for "Check on It", while Williams' was used for the digital single of her cover of Al Green's "Let's Stay Together". Alongside its standard edition, the album's DualDisc edition was also announced, including a bonus DVD with seven music videos and a trailer for the live album Live in Atlanta (2006). In some countries, such as France and Japan, a traditional CD+DVD set was released in lieu of DualDisc. Exclusively at Walmart, the album was packaged with another bonus DVD, titled Fan Pack II, which contained live performances, solo music videos and extra footage. To promote #1's, Destiny's Child performed its lead single "Stand Up for Love" alongside "Survivor" on November 15, 2005 on the television show Jimmy Kimmel Live! as their final televised performance as a group. The group performed "Stand Up for Love" again the same day at the Ronald McDonald House in Los Angeles to celebrate World Children's Day, as the song was touted as the "2005 World Children's Day Anthem", with Destiny's Child as global ambassadors for the program.

"Stand Up for Love" was released as the lead single from #1's on September 27, 2005. Termed as 2005 World Children's Day Anthem, it was used for a global fundraiser for Ronald McDonald House Charities and several other local organizations for children. The song was widely panned by music critics, primarily for its "saccharine" production and lyrical content. A commercial failure, it became Destiny's Child's first single not to enter any of the Billboard charts, and would not chart anywhere until 2014, when it debuted at number 37 on the Gaon Digital Chart in South Korea. The single was the group's final prior to their 2006 disbandment. (Note: The subsequent single from #1's, "Check on It", was a solo song by Beyoncé, thus not a group track.) Its accompanying music video was directed by Matthew Rolston and features the members performing the song in different settings, including against a background displaying videos of children.

Beyoncé's solo track "Check on It" was released as the second and final single from #1's on December 13, 2005, to critical acclaim. Originally recorded for the accompanying soundtrack to the 2006 film The Pink Panther, in which Beyoncé starred, its soundtrack inclusion was ultimately cancelled. A commercial success, the song became Beyoncé's third solo US Billboard Hot 100 number-one single. The digital single was certified double platinum by the Recording Industry Association of America (RIAA) in August 2022. Internationally, the song reached number one in New Zealand, and the top ten Austria, Belgium, Canada, the Czech Republic, Finland, Hungary, Ireland, the Netherlands, New Zealand, Norway, Romania, Switzerland and the United Kingdom. Its Hype Williams-directed accompanying music video features The Pink Panther-themed imagery, with Beyoncé performing the song in various pink outfits. At the 2006 MTV Video Music Awards, the video won Best R&B Video.

== Critical reception ==
Professional ratings
Review scores
Source	Rating
AllMusic	4.5/5 stars
E! Online	B+
The Encyclopedia of Popular Music	4/5 stars
Houston Chronicle	2/4 stars
MTV Asia	8/10
Pitchfork	7.2/10
Slant Magazine	3.5/5 stars
Sputnikmusic	3.5/5
Stylus Magazine	B+
Yahoo! Music UK	7/10 stars

#1's received generally positive reviews from music critics on release. Andy Kellman from AllMusic wrote that the album was formatted the same way as other music scores and anthologies packed for the holiday shopping season. He further commented that its title should have been different but concluded by saying "the disc reaffirms that Destiny's Child released some of the biggest R&B singles of the late '90s and early 2000s." Sal Cinquemani of Slant Magazine also criticized the title, as only four of its tracks reached the summit of the US Billboard Hot 100. However, he praised Destiny's Child's "impressive output, which includes some of the most recognizable R&B hits of the past bling/celly/status-obsessed five years". BBC Online's writer James Blake called the album "more than decent" and added that the group's success in the music industry was a notable reason for a greatest hits release. However, he argued that it was too soon to include songs from their final studio album Destiny Fulfilled, as it was released only 11 months before #1's. Jess Harvell from Pitchfork felt that it was a "smart" move not to arrange the tracks in a chronological order and felt it "has the odd knock-on effect of suggesting that their legacy may be based on a smaller body of work than imagined". Harvell finished the review by writing: "you can take #1's as pure product and not feel wrong for doing so".

Despite classifying its title as "misleading" and criticizing the new material, Houston Chronicle's editor Michael D. Clark described #1's as "dolled up as beautiful and immaculate as" the group members and said it included the group's best singles. John A. Hanson of Sputnikmusic felt that a greatest hits album was released "at the perfect time" as many of its tracks had been released long before and "they've lost the overplayedness, but its [sic] soon enough that they still have some sort of relevance". He concluded by writing "[it] hits you with recognizable hit after recognizable hit, and they are all pretty much as perfect as contemporary R&B-pop gets". Describing the album as a "masterclass in what happens when a great band comes together", Yahoo! Music's Hattie Collins wrote: "Despite the low-points, this is a Destiny's Child must have collection of classics from one of R&B's most significant talents". A more mixed review came from Fiona Mckinlay from musicOMH, who felt the album included many "skippable" songs and noted that the material from The Writing's on the Wall (1999) and Survivor (2001) were the collection's best. She further claimed the progress in the group's sound was evident on #1's, but offered the opinion: "As far as greatest hits albums go, Destiny's Child show themselves to be pretty ace, but still not quite the incredible force in R&B". Aidin Vaziri of San Francisco Chronicle criticized the Destiny Fulfilled tracks and "Stand Up for Love", and concluded by writing: "surveying Destiny's Child's entire career on this set... it's obvious their hearts slipped away around the same time Beyoncé's solo album sold its first million".

== Commercial performance ==
In the United States, #1's debuted atop the Billboard 200 chart dated November 12, 2005, with first-week sales of 113,000 units according to Nielsen SoundScan. It thus became the group's second number-one album, following Survivor (2001). It also debuted atop the Top R&B/Hip-Hop Albums, becoming their third number-one album on the chart. In its second week, the compilation descended to number five on the Billboard 200, registering a 25% sales decrease with 85,000 units. It was certified platinum by the Recording Industry Association of America (RIAA) for shipments of one million units in the US on November 30, 2005. In Canada, the compilation was certified platinum by then-Canadian Recording Industry Association (CRIA) on November 16. In the United Kingdom, #1's debuted and peaked at number six on the UK Albums Chart and atop the UK R&B Albums Chart; it went on to be certified double platinum by the British Phonographic Industry (BPI) in July 2021. Across Europe, it reached the top 10 in Belgium, Ireland, and Switzerland.

In Australia, #1's debuted at number 13, ascending to number 10 in its second week. It debuted at number five in New Zealand, peaking at number three in its second week. By the end of 2005, both Australian Recording Industry Association (ARIA) and Recorded Music NZ (RMNZ) certified the album platinum. In Japan, the compilation debuted atop the Oricon Albums Chart, selling 154,859 copies in its first week. It was certified double platinum by the Recording Industry Association of Japan (RIAJ) in December 2005, and was among the winners of the 2006 Japan Gold Disc Award for International Pop & Rock Albums of the Year. In Hong Kong, the album was among the top 10 best-selling international releases of the year, earning IFPI Hong Kong's Top Sales Music Award. According to the International Federation of the Phonographic Industry (IFPI), #1's was the world's 20th best-selling album of 2005.

== Track listing ==
#1's
No.	Title	Writer(s)	Producer(s)	Length
1.	"Stand Up for Love" (2005 World Children's Day Anthem)	David Foster; Amy Foster-Gillies	Foster; Humberto Gatica; Beyoncé Knowles^{[a]}	4:45
2.	"Independent Women Part I"	B. Knowles; Samuel Barnes; Jean-Claude Olivier; Cory Rooney	B. Knowles; Poke and Tone; Rooney	3:36
3.	"Survivor"	B. Knowles; Anthony Dent; Mathew Knowles	Dent; B. Knowles	3:49
4.	"Soldier" (featuring T.I. and Lil Wayne)	B. Knowles; Kelly Rowland; Michelle Williams; Clifford Harris; Dwayne Carter; Sean Garrett; Rich Harrison	Harrison; B. Knowles^{[a]}	4:05
5.	"Check on It" (Beyoncé featuring Slim Thug)	B. Knowles; Stayve Thomas; Garrett; Kasseem Dean; Angela Beyincé	Swizz Beatz; B. Knowles^{[a]}	3:32
6.	"Jumpin', Jumpin'"	B. Knowles; Chad Elliot; Rufus Moore	Elliot; B. Knowles; Jovonn Alexander	3:49
7.	"Lose My Breath"	B. Knowles; Rowland; Williams; Garrett; Rodney Jerkins; Fred Jerkins III; LaShawn Daniels; Shawn Carter	B. Knowles^{[a]}; R. Jerkins; Garrett^{[b]}; Rowland^{[c]}	3:33
8.	"Say My Name"	B. Knowles; Rowland; LeToya Luckett; LaTavia Roberson; R. Jerkins; F. Jerkins; Daniels	R. Jerkins; Daniels^{[b]}	4:01
9.	"Emotion"	Barry Gibb; Robin Gibb	B. Knowles; Mark Feist; M. Knowles^{[d]}	3:56
10.	"Bug a Boo"	B. Knowles; Rowland; Luckett; Roberson; Kevin Briggs; Kandi Burruss	Briggs^{[a]}; Kandi^{[b]}	3:23
11.	"Bootylicious"	B. Knowles; Rob Fusari; Falonte Moore; Stevie Nicks	B. Knowles; Fusari; Moore	3:29
12.	"Bills, Bills, Bills"	B. Knowles; Rowland; Luckett; Briggs; Burruss	Briggs^{[a]}; B. Knowles^{[b]}	3:45
13.	"Girl"	B. Knowles; Rowland; Williams; Garrett; Beyincé; Patrick Douthit; Don Davis; Eddie Robinson	B. Knowles^{[a]}; 9th Wonder; Rowland^{[c]}	3:27
14.	"No, No, No Part 2" (featuring Wyclef Jean)	Fusari; Mary Brown; Calvin Gaines; Vincent Herbert	Wyclef; Jerry Duplessis^{[d]}; Che Greene^{[d]}	3:15
15.	"Cater 2 U"	B. Knowles; Rowland; Williams; R. Jerkins; Ricky Lewis; Robert Waller	B. Knowles^{[a]}; R. Jerkins; Ric Rude; Rowland^{[c]}; Williams^{[c]}	4:07
16.	"Feel the Same Way I Do"	B. Knowles; Rowland; Williams; R. Jerkins; F. Jerkins; Daniels; Lewis	R. Jerkins; B. Knowles^{[a]}; Ric Rude	4:06
Total length:				60:27

Japanese edition
No.	Title	Writer(s)	Producer(s)	Length
17.	"So Good"	B. Knowles; Rowland; Luckett; Roberson; Briggs; Burruss	Briggs^{[a]}; Kandi^{[b]}	3:13
18.	"Nasty Girl"	B. Knowles; Dent; Maurizio Bassi; Naimy Hackett	Dent; B. Knowles	4:18
Total length:				67:58

=== Notes ===
- ^a signifies a producer and vocal producer
- ^b signifies a vocal producer
- ^c signifies an additional vocal producer
- ^d signifies a co-producer
- DualDisc pressings include a trailer for Live in Atlanta and music videos for tracks 2–4, 7, 8, 11, 14, and 15.
- Walmart exclusive edition pressings include a bonus DVD containing live performances of tracks 13 and 15, a video megamix, Ronald McDonald House Charities promotional footage, music videos for "Train on a Track", "Do You Know", and "Me, Myself and I", and a trailer for Live in Atlanta.

Sample credits

- "Bootylicious" contains elements from "Edge of Seventeen" by Stevie Nicks.
- "Girl" contains sampled elements from the composition "Ocean of Thoughts and Dreams" by the Dramatics.
- "No, No, No Part 2" contains elements from "Strange Games and Things" by Barry White.
- "Nasty Girl" contains replayed elements from "Tarzan Boy" by Baltimora and uncredited interpolations from "Push It" by Salt-N-Pepa.

== Personnel ==
Credits are adapted from the liner notes of #1's.

- Charles Alexander – mixing (track 6)
- Jovonn Alexander – production (track 6)
- Rich Balmer – engineering assistance (track 3)
- Steve Baughman – mixing assistance (track 12)
- Karren Berz – live strings (track 3)
- Angela Beyincé – songwriting (tracks 5 and 13)
- Courtney Blooding – production coordination (track 1)
- Kevin "She'kspere" Briggs – engineering (tracks 10 and 12), instrumentation (tracks 10 and 12), Midi & Sound (tracks 10 and 12), production (tracks 10 and 12), songwriting (tracks 10 and 12), vocal production (tracks 10 and 12)
- Mary Brown – songwriting (track 14)
- Kandi Burruss – songwriting (tracks 10 and 12), vocal production (track 10)
- Michael Calderon – engineering (track 12)
- Orlando Calzada – engineering (track 3)
- Jim Caruana – engineering (tracks 4, 5, 7, 13, 15 and 16)
- Shawn Carter – songwriting (track 7)
- Jules Chaikin – orchestra contracting (track 1)
- Fusako Chubachi – art direction, design
- Quincy S. Jackson - marketing
- Vinnie Colaiuta – drums (track 1)
- Paulinho da Costa – percussion (track 1)
- Tom Coyne – mastering (all tracks)
- LaShawn Daniels – engineering (track 8), songwriting (tracks 7, 8 and 16), vocal production (track 8)
- Don Davis – songwriting (track 13)
- Kevin "KD" Davis – mixing (tracks 10 and 12)
- Andre DeBaurg – engineering (track 6)
- Anthony Dent – engineering (track 3), production (track 3), songwriting (track 3)
- Neil Devor – digital engineering (track 1)
- David Donaldson – engineering (track 6)
- Patrick "9th Wonder" Douthit – production (track 13), songwriting (track 13)
- Jerry Duplessis – production (track 14)
- Nathan East – bass (track 1)
- Chad Elliot – mixing (track 6), production (track 6), songwriting (track 6)
- Robert Erdmann – photography
- Mark Feist – production (track 9)
- Fabrizio Ferri – photography
- Amy Foster-Gillies – lyrical songwriting (track 1)
- David Foster – arrangement (track 1), keyboards (track 1), musical songwriting (track 1), production (track 1), string arrangement (track 1)
- Farrah Franklin – backing vocals (track 2)
- Rob Fusari – production (track 11), songwriting (tracks 11 and 14)
- Calvin Gaines – songwriting (track 14)
- Sean Garrett – production (track 4), songwriting (tracks 4, 5, 7 and 13), vocal production (track 7)
- Humberto Gatica – engineering (track 1), mixing (track 1), production (track 1)
- Barry Gibb – songwriting (track 9)
- Robin Gibb – songwriting (track 9)
- Brad Gildem – engineering (track 8)
- Rawle Gittens – additional engineering (track 14)
- Troy Gonzalez – additional engineering (track 2)
- Erwin Gorostiza – art direction
- Che Greene – production (track 14)
- Andy Gwynn – mixing assistance (track 3)
- Rich Harrison – production (track 4), songwriting (track 4)
- Vincent Herbert – songwriting (track 14)
- James Hoover – engineering (track 14)
- Jean Marie Hurout – mixing (track 8)
- Wyclef Jean – production (track 14), vocals (track 14)
- Storm Jefferson – engineering assistance (track 14), mixing assistance (track 14)
- Nathan Jenkins – engineering (track 5)
- Fred Jerkins III – songwriting (tracks 7, 8 and 16)
- Rodney Jerkins – instrumentation (tracks 7, 8 and 15), production (tracks 7, 8, 15 and 16), songwriting (tracks 7, 8, 15 and 16)
- Beyoncé Knowles – backing vocals (all tracks), executive production, lead vocals (all tracks), production (tracks 1–7, 9, 11, 13, 15 and 16), vocal arrangement (track 9), vocal production (tracks 1, 4, 5, 7, 12, 13, 15 and 16), songwriting (tracks 2–8, 10–13, 15 and 16)
- Mathew Knowles – executive production, production (track 9), songwriting (track 3)
- Mike Kopcha – mixing assistance (track 10)
- Jason Larien – engineering assistance (track 1)
- Ricky "Ric Rude" Lewis – instrumentation (track 15), production (tracks 15 and 16), songwriting (tracks 15 and 16)
- Lil Wayne – songwriting (track 4), vocals (track 4)
- LeToya Luckett – backing vocals (tracks 6, 8, 10 and 12), songwriting (tracks 8, 10 and 12)
- Fabian Marasciullo – additional vocal engineering (track 4)
- Tony Maserati – mixing (tracks 3, 7, 11 and 15)
- Errol "Poppi" McCalla, Jr. – additional programming (track 9)
- Falonte Moore – production (track 11), songwriting (track 11)
- Rufus Moore – songwriting (track 6)
- Ramon Morales – additional engineering (track 2), engineering (track 10)
- Vernon Mungoat – engineering (track 12)
- Huy Nguyen – A&R
- Stevie Nicks – songwriting (track 11)
- Flip Osman – mixing assistance (tracks 3 and 11)
- Dean Parks – guitar (track 1)
- Dave "Hard Drive" Pensado – mixing (tracks 5, 9 and 13)
- Poke & Tone – production (track 2), songwriting (track 2)
- Claudine Pontier – engineering assistance (track 12)
- Redd – keyboards (track 3)
- Geoffrey Rice – engineering assistance (track 5)
- Warren Riker – engineering (track 14), mixing (track 14)
- Byron Rittenhouse – vocals (track 6)
- Alejandro Rodriguez – digital engineering (track 1)
- Cory Rooney – production (track 2), songwriting (track 2)
- LaTavia Roberson – backing vocals (tracks 6, 8, 10 and 12), songwriting (tracks 8 and 10)
- Eddie Robinson – songwriting (track 13)
- Kelly Rowland – backing vocals (tracks 1–4 and 6–16), executive production, lead vocals (tracks 1–4, 7, 9–13, 15 and 16), songwriting (tracks 4, 7, 8, 10, 12, 13, 15 and 16)
- Bill Ross – string arrangement (track 1)
- Matt Serrecchio – engineering assistance (track 5)
- Dexter Simmons – mixing (tracks 4, 5 and 16)
- Slim Thug – songwriting (track 5), vocals (track 5)
- Spicer – photography
- Brian Springer – engineering (track 9)
- Manelich Sotolongo – engineering (track 2)
- Tim Stewart – guitar (track 15)
- Swizz Beatz – production (track 5), songwriting (track 5)
- Tom Tapley – additional vocal engineering (track 4)
- T.I. – songwriting (track 4), vocals (track 4)
- Rich Travali – mixing (track 2)
- Jochem van der Saag – organ (track 1), programming (track 1), sound design (track 1)
- Jeff Villanueva – engineering (tracks 7, 15 and 16)
- Rommel Nino Villanueva – additional Pro Tools editing (track 4)
- Robert Waller – songwriting (track 15)
- Michelle Williams – backing vocals (tracks 1–4, 7, 9, 11, 13, 15 and 16), executive production, lead vocals (tracks 1, 3, 4, 7, 9, 11, 13, 15 and 16), songwriting (tracks 4, 7, 13, 15 and 16)
- Dan Workman – additional engineering (track 9), engineering (tracks 10, 11)

== Charts ==
=== Weekly charts ===
2005–2007 weekly chart performance
Chart	Peak position
Australian Albums (ARIA)	10
Australian Urban Albums (ARIA)	1
Austrian Albums (Ö3 Austria)	32
Belgian Albums (Ultratop Flanders)	9
Belgian Albums (Ultratop Wallonia)	29
Canadian Albums (Nielsen SoundScan)	12
Dutch Albums (Album Top 100)	31
European Top 100 Albums (Billboard)	9
French Albums (SNEP)	189
German Albums (Offizielle Top 100)	27
Irish Albums (IRMA)	8
Italian Albums (FIMI)	31
Japanese Albums (Oricon)	1
Norwegian Albums (VG-lista)	39
New Zealand Albums (RMNZ)	3
Scottish Albums (Official Charts)	10
Spanish Albums (Promusicae)	38
Swedish Albums (Sverigetopplistan)	35
Swiss Albums (Schweizer Hitparade)	8
UK Albums (OCC)	6
UK R&B Albums (Official Charts)	1
US Billboard 200	1
US Top R&B/Hip-Hop Albums (Billboard)	1

2010 weekly chart performance
Chart	Peak position
South Korean International Albums (Gaon)	45

=== Monthly charts ===
2005 monthly chart performance
Chart	Position
South Korean International Albums (RIAK)	9

=== Year-end charts ===
2005 year-end chart performance
Chart	Position
Australian Albums (ARIA)	65
Australian Urban Albums (ARIA)	11
Japanese Albums (Oricon)	37
New Zealand Albums (RMNZ)	35
UK Albums (OCC)	120
Worldwide Albums (IFPI)	20

2006 year-end chart performance
Chart	Position
Australian Albums (ARIA)	87
Australian Urban Albums (ARIA)	8
Japanese Albums (Oricon)	54
US Billboard 200	63
US Top R&B/Hip-Hop Albums (Billboard)	34

2007 year-end chart performance
Chart	Position
Australian Urban Albums (ARIA)	25

2008 year-end chart performance
Chart	Position
Australian Urban Albums (ARIA)	45

== Certifications ==
Certifications and sales
Region	Certification	Certified units/sales
Argentina (CAPIF)	Gold	20,000^{^}
Australia (ARIA)	Platinum	70,000^{^}
Canada (Music Canada)	Platinum	100,000^{^}
Ireland (IRMA)	2× Platinum	30,000^{^}
Japan (RIAJ)	2× Platinum	500,000^{^}
New Zealand (RMNZ)	2× Platinum	30,000^{‡}
South Korea	—	4,188
United Kingdom (BPI)	2× Platinum	600,000^{‡}
United States (RIAA)	Platinum	1,000,000^{^}
^{^} Shipments figures based on certification alone.^{‡} Sales+streaming figures based on certification alone.

== Release history ==
Release dates and formats
Region	Date	Format(s)	Label(s)	Ref.
Germany	October 21, 2005	CD; digital download; DualDisc	Sony BMG	
Australia	October 24, 2005	CD; digital download; DualDisc	Sony BMG	
France	October 24, 2005	CD; CD + DVD	Columbia	
Poland	October 24, 2005	CD	Sony BMG	
United Kingdom	October 24, 2005	CD	Columbia	
United States	October 25, 2005	CD; CD + DVD (Note: exclusive at Walmart); digital download; DualDisc	Columbia; Music World; Sony Urban Music	
Denmark	October 26, 2005	CD	Sony BMG	
Japan	October 26, 2005	CD; CD + DVD	Sony Japan	
Korea	November 1, 2005	Cassette; CD	Sony BMG	

== See also ==
- Destiny's Child discography
- List of Billboard 200 number-one albums of 2005
- List of Billboard number-one R&B/hip-hop albums of 2005
- List of Oricon number-one albums of 2005
- List of UK R&B Albums Chart number ones of 2005
