= Now That's What I Call Music! 11 (American series) =

Compilation album by various artists
- Released: November 19, 2002
- Length: 74:06
- Label: UMG

Series chronology
Now That's What I Call Music! 10 (2002)	Now That's What I Call Music! 11 (2002)	Now That's What I Call Music! 12 (2003)

Now That's What I Call Music! 11 is the eleventh volume of the Now That's What I Call Music! series in the United States. It was released on November 19, 2002, and debuted at number two on the Billboard 200 albums chart. It has been certified 2× Platinum by the RIAA.

== Reception ==
Professional ratings
Review scores
Source	Rating
AllMusic	3/5 stars

William Ruhlmann of AllMusic says: "This one, which looks over the late summer and early fall of 2002, is divided up into genres, as usual—probably to make it easier for buyers to skip whole sections that they don't like. For example, the rap material is all up front, while the hard rock tracks are sequestered together at the end. In between comes a group of dance-oriented and adult contemporary female voices."

Nikki Tranter of PopMatters says, "Universal releasing no less than 11 editions indicates just how rapidly brand new hits become stale oldies. Take their latest release, for example — three months after the release of the CD, many of these songs are already old news, some having long ago left the Billboard charts. Regardless, whether you’re the type of consumer who picks up these little packages in order to save money on CD singles, or you’re one of those rare individuals who actually likes all the songs collected, a run down of the latest track listing instantly lets you know whether or not you’re in line with the cool kids, because these songs, as the title suggests, are (or, at least, were) just so damn Now."

== Track listing ==
Now That's What I Call Music! 11 track listing
No.	Title	Artist	Length
1.	"Hot in Herre"	Nelly	3:49
2.	"Nothin'" (contains uncredited vocals from Pharrell)	N.O.R.E.	3:57
3.	"Gangsta Lovin'"	Eve featuring Alicia Keys	3:59
4.	"Feel It Boy" (Radio Edit)	Beenie Man featuring Janet Jackson	3:22
5.	"Days Go By" (Radio Edit)	Dirty Vegas	3:41
6.	"Love at First Sight"	Kylie Minogue	3:57
7.	"Objection (Tango)" (Radio Edit)	Shakira	3:42
8.	"Underneath It All" (Radio Edit)	No Doubt featuring Lady Saw	4:07
9.	"BareNaked" (Radio Edit)	Jennifer Love Hewitt	3:19
10.	"Ordinary Day"	Vanessa Carlton	3:58
11.	"Landslide"	Dixie Chicks	3:19
12.	"I Care 4 U"	Aaliyah	4:34
13.	"Stingy" (Radio Edit)	Ginuwine	3:59
14.	"Don't Know Why"	Norah Jones	3:06
15.	"Hero" (Single Mix)	Chad Kroeger featuring Josey Scott	3:09
16.	"Running Away"	Hoobastank	2:58
17.	"In My Place"	Coldplay	3:48
18.	"One Last Breath"	Creed	3:58
19.	"Somewhere Out There"	Our Lady Peace	4:11
20.	"Everyday"	Bon Jovi	3:00
Total length:			1:14:06

== Charts ==
=== Weekly charts ===
Chart (2002)	Peak position
US Billboard 200	2

=== Year-end charts ===
Chart (2003)	Position
US Billboard 200	15

== Certifications ==
Region	Certification	Certified units/sales
United States (RIAA)	2× Platinum	2,000,000^{^}
^{^} Shipments figures based on certification alone.
