= Sugarhigh =

2002 song by Jade Anderson

Single by Jade Anderson

from the album Dive Deeper
- Released: March 2002
- Length: 4:12 (original); 3:24 (radio edit)
- Label: Columbia
- Songwriter(s): Jade Anderson; Eg White

Jade Anderson singles chronology
"Sugarhigh" (2002)	"Sweetest Memories" (2002)

"Sugarhigh" is a song by English singer-songwriter Jade Anderson from her album Dive Deeper. It was released in March 2002.

== Background and composition ==
The song, written by Jade Anderson and Eg White, has a tempo of 98 beats per minute and is in the key of C sharp minor, switching to D minor later in the song.

"Sugarhigh," is the lead single off of Jade Anderson's only studio album Dive Deeper, as well as her first single and only charting single, entering the Billboard Hot 100 for two weeks, peaking at number 96, in addition to the US Mainstream Top 40 and Dance Club Songs charts. It also achieved a peak of number 85 on the Dutch Singles Chart, on which it spent a total of four weeks. Chuck Taylor of Billboard noted the song's "Spanish flavor that radiates warmth and charm, with a remarkably adept story about her love for a special guy," and deemed it "one of the most obvious breakout hits we've heard for Top 40 this year", concluding that Anderson was "a stone-solid bet for stardom". In March 2002, Billboard reported that the song was "starting to make inroads at radio". It was also featured on the pop compilation Now That's What I Call Music! 10 and several other pop and dance compilations.

Jonathan Widran of AllMusic reviewed the album the single appeared on, Dive Deeper, along with the single itself, stating it has "solid production" and an "irresistible hook."

== Charts ==
Chart (2002)	Peak position
Netherlands (Dutch Top 40)	85
US Billboard Hot 100	96
US Dance Club Songs (Billboard)	37
