= List of Billboard 200 number-one albums of 2001 =

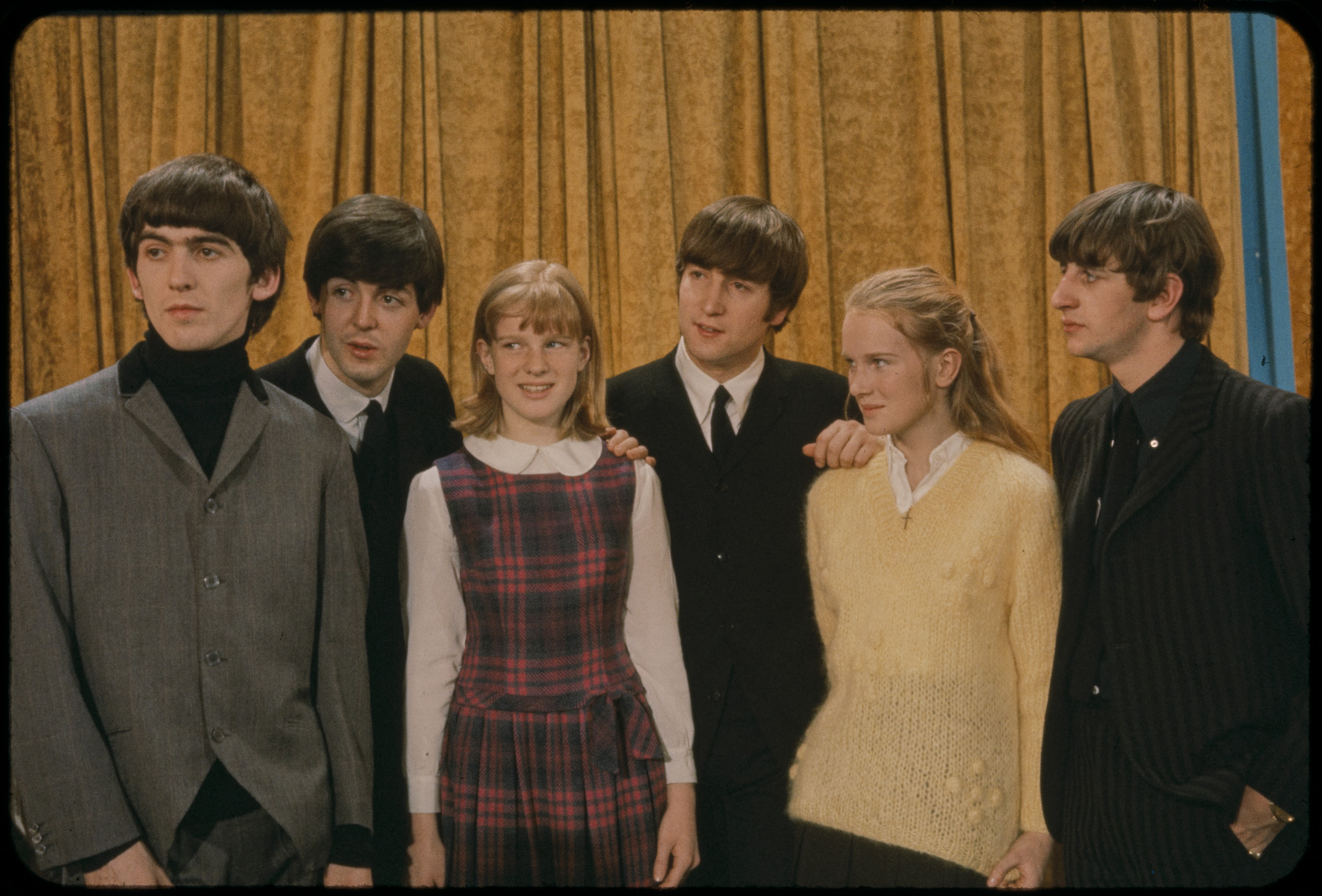
The Beatles' greatest hits album 1 was the best-selling album of 2001.

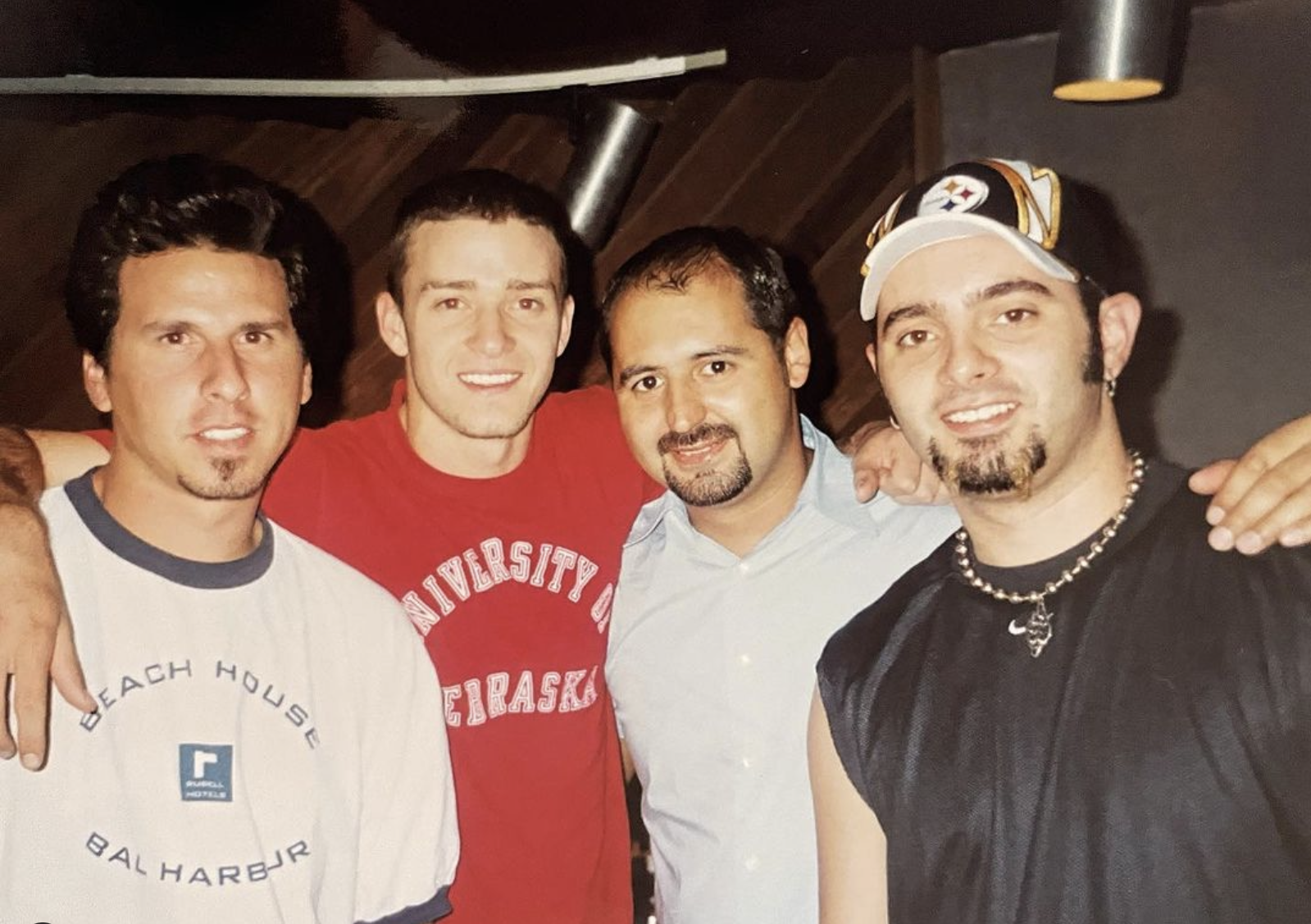
Celebrity by NSYNC had the biggest sales week of 2001, selling 1.8 million copies in its first week.

The Billboard 200, published in the Billboard magazine, is a weekly chart that ranks the highest-selling albums in the United States. The data is compiled by Nielsen SoundScan based on each album's weekly physical and digital sales. In 2001, 27 albums reached the top of the chart.

The first number-one album of the year was 1 by English rock band the Beatles, which reached the top in December 2000 and continued its run until early February 2001 for a total of eight weeks. Shaggy achieved his first number-one album with Hot Shot. It topped the chart for a total of six weeks and sold more than 5.5 million copies within the year. Staind's Break the Cycle topped the charts for three consecutive weeks in June and sold more than 4.2 million copies in 2001. NSYNC achieved the best-selling album within the first week, selling more than 1.8 million copies with Celebrity, 620,000 more than above earlier in the year. Furthermore, it was the tenth album to sell more than a million units in its first week sakes, since Nielsen SoundScan started collecting data in 1991. Furthermore, it was the third best-selling album of the year and was certified 5-times platinum by the Recording Industry Association of America (RIAA). Following her death, Aaliyah's reached the top for one week in September with her eponymous studio album.

Jay-Z earned his fourth number-one album in the US with The Blueprint. In its third week atop the chart, the record sold about 173,000 copies, the lowest for any number-one in the year. Ja Rule eventually achieved his second and most recent chart-topping album with Pain Is Love., (Note: As of April 2019) dethroning Jay-Z in mid-October and topping the chart for two consecutive weeks. The last album to top the chart in 2001 was Weathered by American rock band Creed. It peaked at number one for four consecutive weeks in 2001 and continued for four weeks in January 2002. The album, released in November, was the eighth best-selling record of the year, selling about 3.5 million copies; it is certified 6-times platinum by the RIAA. Unusually, the year's best-selling record, Hybrid Theory by Linkin Park, was not able to top the Billboard 200. Instead the Beatles' 1 was crowned the most successful album of the year.

== Number-ones ==
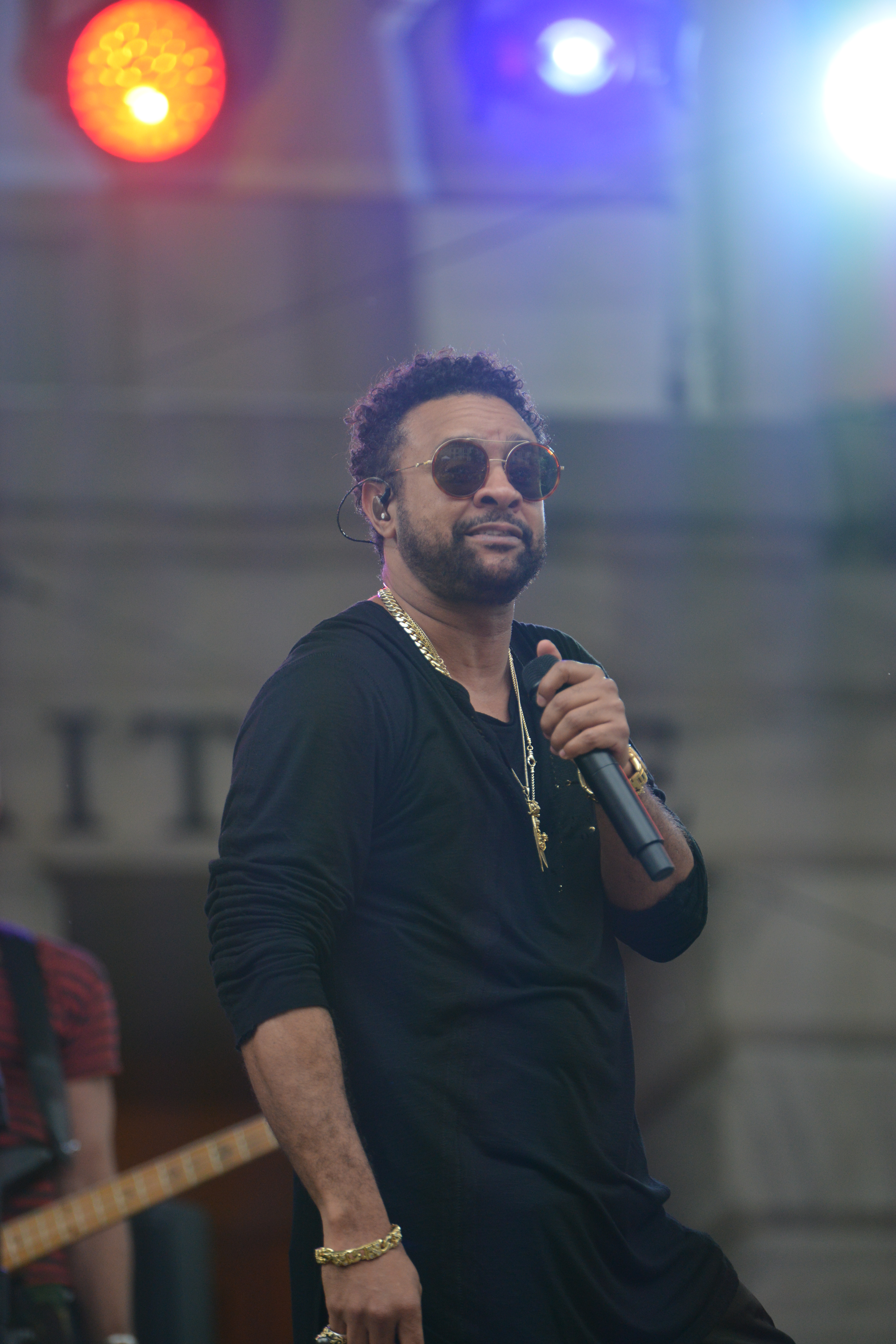
Shaggy's (pictured in 2018) Hot Shot was the second-best-selling album in the United States, selling more than 5.5 million copies in 2001.

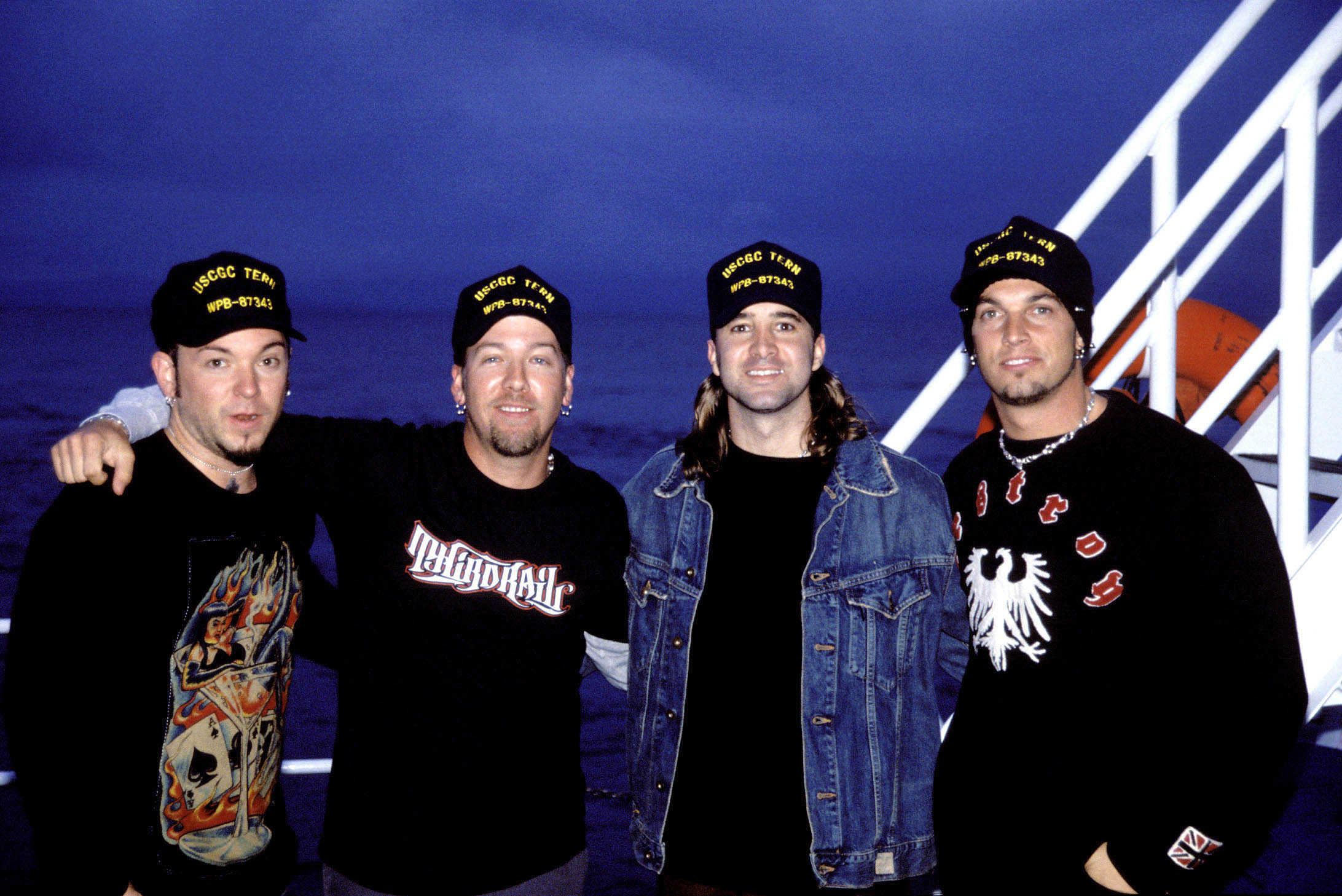
Creed's Weathered topped the charts for four weeks and sold more than 3.5 million copies.

Key
†	Indicates the best performing album of 2001

Issue date	Album	Artist(s)	Label	Sales	Ref.
January 6	1 †	The Beatles	Apple	1,258,667	
January 13	1 †	The Beatles	Apple	451,253	
January 20	1 †	The Beatles	Apple	268,551	
January 27	1 †	The Beatles	Apple	260,179	
February 3	1 †	The Beatles	Apple	215,534	
February 10	J. Lo	Jennifer Lopez	Epic	272,262	
February 17	Hot Shot	Shaggy	MCA	245,678	
February 24	Hot Shot	Shaggy	MCA	245,778	
March 3	Hot Shot	Shaggy	MCA	293,979	
March 10	Hot Shot	Shaggy	MCA	271,652	
March 17	Everyday	Dave Matthews Band	RCA	732,720	
March 24	Everyday	Dave Matthews Band	RCA	280,081	
March 31	Hot Shot	Shaggy	MCA	209,767	
April 7	Hot Shot	Shaggy	MCA	188,838	
April 14	Until the End of Time	2Pac	Amaru	426,870	
April 21	Now That's What I Call Music! 6	Various Artists	Epic	525,005	
April 28	Now That's What I Call Music! 6	Various Artists	Epic	546,778	
May 5	Now That's What I Call Music! 6	Various Artists	Epic	248,811	
May 12	All for You	Janet	Virgin	605,128	
May 19	Survivor	Destiny's Child	Columbia	663,280	
May 26	Survivor	Destiny's Child	Columbia	358,959	
June 2	Lateralus	Tool	Tool Dissectional/Volcano	555,222	
June 9	Break the Cycle	Staind	Flip	716,003	
June 16	Break the Cycle	Staind	Flip	326,299	
June 23	Break the Cycle	Staind	Flip	244,698	
June 30	Take Off Your Pants and Jacket	Blink-182	MCA	349,846	
July 7	Devil's Night	D12	Shady	371,881	
July 14	Songs in A Minor	Alicia Keys	J	235,816	
July 21	Devil's Night	D12	Shady	173,956	
July 28	Songs in A Minor	Alicia Keys	J	221,813	
August 4	Songs in A Minor	Alicia Keys	J	221,749	
August 11	Celebrity	NSYNC	Jive	1,879,955	
August 18	Now That's What I Call Music! 7	Various Artists	Virgin	621,419	
August 25	Now That's What I Call Music! 7	Various Artists	Virgin	394,483	
September 1	Now That's What I Call Music! 7	Various Artists	Virgin	278,538	
September 8	Now	Maxwell	Columbia	296,388	
September 15	Aaliyah	Aaliyah	Blackground	305,911	
September 22	Toxicity	System of a Down	American	222,038	
September 29	The Blueprint	Jay-Z	Roc-A-Fella	426,550	
October 6	The Blueprint	Jay-Z	Roc-A-Fella	270,814	
October 13	The Blueprint	Jay-Z	Roc-A-Fella	173,663	
October 20	Pain Is Love	Ja Rule	Murder, Inc.	360,712	
October 27	Pain Is Love	Ja Rule	Murder, Inc.	220,793	
November 3	God Bless America: For the Benefit of the Twin Towers Fund	Various Artists	Columbia	180,894	
November 10	The Great Depression	DMX	Ruff Ryders	439,957	
November 17	Invincible	Michael Jackson	Epic	366,272	
November 24	Britney	Britney Spears	Jive	745,744	
December 1	Scarecrow	Garth Brooks	Capitol	465,523	
December 8	Weathered	Creed	Wind-Up	887,229	
December 15	Weathered	Creed	Wind-Up	417,462	
December 22	Weathered	Creed	Wind-Up	458,033	
December 29	Weathered	Creed	Wind-Up	555,092	

== See also ==
- 2001 in music
- List of number-one albums (United States)
