= Stand Up for Love =

Single by Destiny's Child

from the album #1's
- Released: September 26, 2005
- Recorded: 2005
- Studio: Chartmaker (Malibu); Record Plant (Los Angeles)
- Genre: Adult contemporary; pop; R&B
- Length: 4:46
- Label: Columbia; Sony Urban
- Songwriter(s): David Foster; Amy Foster-Gillies
- Producer(s): David Foster; Humberto Gatica

Destiny's Child singles chronology
"Cater 2 U" (2005)	"Stand Up for Love" (2005)	"The Girl Is Mine" (2015)

Music video
- "Stand Up for Love" on YouTube

"Stand Up for Love" is a song recorded by American group Destiny's Child for their first greatest hits album #1's (2005). It was written by Amy Foster-Gillies and David Foster, with the latter also serving as the producer alongside Humberto Gatica. Musically, the track is a mid-tempo ballad drawing influences from adult contemporary, pop and R&B. Inspired by poverty-stricken children and families, the song was termed the "2005 World Children's Day Anthem", and used in conjunction with Ronald McDonald House Charities to raise awareness of the day. "Stand Up for Love" was released as the lead single from #1's on September 26, 2005, by Columbia Records and Sony Urban Music.

Upon its release, "Stand Up for Love" received negative reviews from music critics, who criticized its composition and inclusion on #1's. Initially, the song was the group's only single not to enter any record charts; however, it peaked at number 37 in South Korea in 2014. The accompanying music video for the song, directed by Matthew Rolston, featured the trio singing the song against a backdrop displaying videos of children. Destiny's Child performed "Stand Up for Love" on several occasions after its release; it was the final single released before the group's disbandment in 2006. Since then, several artists have covered the song.

== Writing and production ==
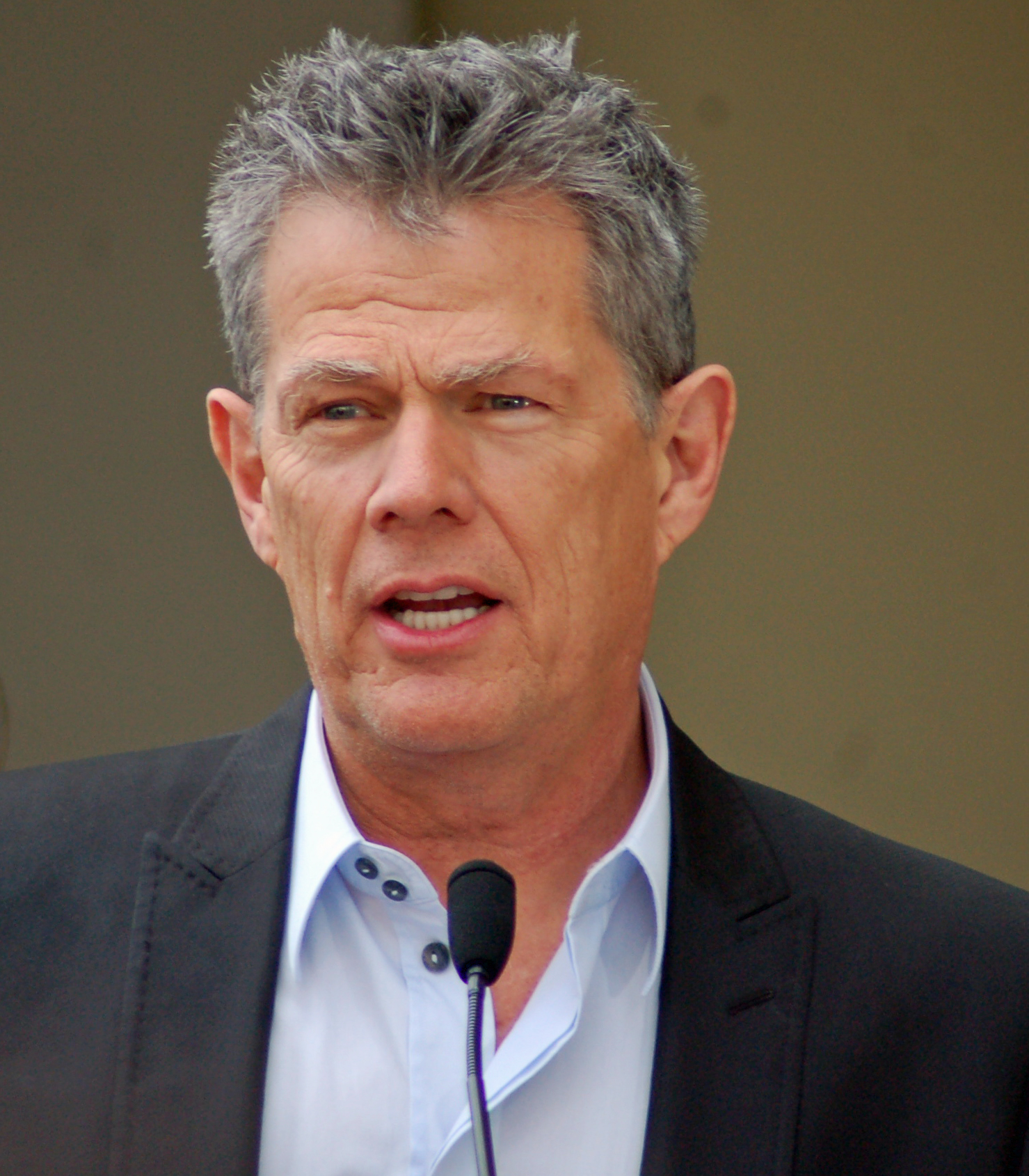
"Stand Up for Love" was written by Canadian musician David Foster (pictured) along with his daughter Amy Foster-Gillies.

Canadian musician David Foster was inspired to write "Stand Up for Love" for poverty-stricken children and families which receive funds from charitable organization. Destiny's Child lead singer Beyoncé acknowledged that they wanted to record the song for the people who help impoverished families. She furthered by saying: "The kids we've met have no idea how much they've given us. We wanted to record this song for them, in hopes that people would hear their voice through ours." Michelle Williams explained the song was her "favorite" and went on to describe it as "one of the best songs that we've done collectively", emphasizing the vocal performance.

"Stand Up for Love" was composed and arranged by Foster, who also served as its co-writer along with his daughter Amy Foster-Gillies. Foster produced the song with Humberto Gatica, who also engineered and mixed it. The song was recorded at Chartmaker Studios and The Record Plant, and was mixed at the former. Nathan East was responsible for playing the bass, while Vinnie Colaiuta and Paulinho Da Costa handled the drums and percussion, respectively.

== Music and lyrics ==
"Stand Up for Love"
A 20-second sample from the chorus of "Stand Up for Love" during which the band members sing together.

"Stand Up for Love" is an adult contemporary, pop and R&B ballad with a length of four minutes and 46 seconds. According to the sheet music published by Peer International Corporation on the website Musicnotes.com, "Stand Up for Love" is set in common time with a slow tempo of seventy beats per minute. It is written in the key of A♭ major, and Destiny's Child's vocals range from the low note of E♭_{3} to the high note of E_{5}. Michael D. Clark from the Houston Chronicle compared Beyoncé's vocals with Michael Jackson and Whitney Houston "in an effort to play the weepy heartstrings". Matthew Jacobs, writing on behalf of HuffPost compared the song's sound to a movie ballad from the 1990s, taken from an "empowering" animated movie. Lyrically, the song encourages togetherness: "And I believe that in my life I will see / An end to hopelessness, or giving up, or suffering / If we all stand together this one time / Then no one will get left behind".

== Release and promotion ==
"Stand Up for Love" was released as the lead single from #1's by Columbia Records and Sony Urban Music, and became the group's final single together before their disbandment. It was released as a 7-inch single on September 27, 2005. The song was touted as the "2005 World Children's Day Anthem" in conjunction with Ronald McDonald House Charities. It was used to raise awareness of the day; Destiny's Child were also global ambassadors for the 2005 program.

In August 2007, the Society for the Promotion of Community Standards (SPCS) requested "Stand Up for Love" to be played on radio stations in New Zealand to reflect on child abuse after the Nia Glassie abuse case received widespread media attention. Similarly, organizations Sensible Sentencing Trust, Family First, and For the Sake of Our Children Trust asked for increased airplay of the song during a three-minute silence, which was also requested by them.

== Critical reception ==
"Stand Up for Love" received negative reviews from most music critics. James Blake writing for BBC Online, described "Stand Up for Love" as a "sugary ballad". Pitchfork Media's writer Jess Harvell criticized the song by writing: "Opener 'Stand Up for Love' is subtitled the '2005 World Children's Day Anthem', which should tell you all you really need to know, i.e. Diane Warren should be banned under the Geneva Conventions". Fiona Mckinlay criticized the fact that the song was used as an opener for #1's and felt it wasn't "really causing any kind of reaction before they get started properly with Independent Woman Pt.1". Houston Chronicle's Michael D. Clark described the track as "overwrought and overproduced; at best, it's a future prom theme". Matthew Jacobs of The Huffington Post felt it was "great" the song was used for World's Children day but described it as a "total snoozefest". Chuck Taylor of Billboard commented that the song lacked the potential to become a chart-topper. Taylor reviewed the song negatively, classifying it as a "schmaltzy" ballad aimed at adult contemporary radio, adding that it was a "disappointing nonstarter".

Jim Kiest from the San Antonio Express-News wrote "hopefully 'Stand Up for Love' won't be [a number-one single]". Aidin Vaziri of San Francisco Chronicle, who positively reviewed #1's, concluded his review by writing: "And the less said about the very new stuff, including the single 'Stand Up for Love (2005 World Children's Day Anthem),' the sweeter the memories". Similarly, Hattie Collins of Yahoo! Music felt that "Stand Up for Love" was "stuffed full of lazy lyricisms and sloppily sentimentality" further describing it as "utterly vomitous". She felt that the song was one of the material that "let this otherwise cracking compilation down". Slant Magazine's Sal Cinquemani panned the song as "awful and saccharine" and felt that it "show[s] that the women of Destiny's Child are squarely focused on their (solo) futures". In contrast, Lindsey Weber from Vulture put "Stand Up for Love" at number 16 on her list of the top 25 songs by Destiny's Child in 2013.

== Music video ==
The accompanying music video for "Stand Up for Love" was directed by Matthew Rolston. It was filmed in September 2005, following Destiny's Child final concert as part of their tour Destiny Fulfilled... and Lovin' It in Vancouver. MTV News described it as a performance video. It features all members, wearing black dresses, singing their respective solo verses individually and later together during the song's chorus in front of a screen which displays videos of children and different scenery. During the end, the group is seen wearing white clothes and performing the song in a white setting; several shots are filmed using a black-and-white technique. It was released via MTV's official website on October 25, 2005. The video was also included on the video album Destiny's Child Video Anthology (2013). At the 2006 MTV Video Music Awards Japan, "Stand Up for Love" received a nomination in the category for Best R&B Video, but lost to Ai's "Story". The same year, the visual was nominated in the category for Outstanding Music Video at the 37th NAACP Image Awards, but lost to Alicia Keys' "Unbreakable" (2005).

== Live performances ==
Destiny's Child performed "Stand Up for Love" for the first time on November 15, 2005, along with "Survivor", on the show Jimmy Kimmel Live!. It marked the group's final televised performance before their disbandment. The same day, they performed the song at Ronald McDonald House Charities in Los Angeles for World Children's Day.

== Cover versions ==
On December 29, 2008, Girls' Generation's Taeyeon, Davichi and Wonder Girls's Sunye, performed "Stand Up for Love" in a special stage called "Diva" at SBS Gayo Daejeon. On June 3, 2011, South Korean band Rania, performed "Stand Up for Love" at MBC's radio programme Shimshimtapa. In April 2013, singer Aram, a member of the South Korean group Global Icon, uploaded a cover of "Stand Up for Love". A writer from Allkpop described it as "beautiful" and praised her for "hit[ting] every note with perfect control". At the 2014 Miss Thailand World, contestant Maeya performed "Stand Up for Love". Bangkok Post's writer Pim Ungphakorn described it as a "beautiful rendition".

== Formats and track listings ==
Promotional maxi CD single

1. "Stand Up for Love" (radio edit) – 4:26
2. "Stand Up for Love" – 4:46
3. "Stand Up for Love" (instrumental) – 4:45
4. "Call Out Hook" – 0:12

7-inch vinyl

1. "Stand Up for Love" – 4:46
2. "Stand Up for Love" (instrumental) – 4:45

== Credits and personnel ==
Credits are adapted from the liner notes of the album #1's.

- Courtney Blooding – production coordination
- Jules Chaikin – orchestra contractor
- Vinnie Colaiuta – drums
- Paulinho Da Costa – percussion
- Neil Devor – digital engineering
- Nathan East – bass
- David Foster – music writing, production, arrangement, string arrangement, keyboards
- Amy Foster-Gillies –lyrics
- Humberto Gatica – production, engineering, mixing
- Beyoncé Knowles – vocals, vocal production
- Jason Larian – assistance
- Dean Parks – guitar
- Alejandro Roodriguez – digital engineering
- Bill Ross – string arrangement
- Kelly Rowland – vocals, vocal production
- Michelle Williams – vocals
- Jochem van der Saag – organ, sound design, programming

== Charts ==
=== Weekly charts ===
Chart (2014)	Peak position
South Korea International (Circle)	37

== Release history ==
Release dates and formats for "Stand Up for Love"
Region	Date	Format(s)	Label(s)	Ref.
United States	September 26, 2005	Adult contemporary radio; contemporary hit radio; rhythmic contemporary radio	Columbia; Sony Urban	
United States	September 27, 2005	7-inch vinyl	Columbia; Sony Urban	
United States	October 3, 2005	Gospel radio; hot adult contemporary radio; urban contemporary radio; urban adult contemporary radio	Columbia; Sony Urban	
Various	December 31, 2005	Digital download (EP)	Columbia; Sony Urban	
