= Now That's What I Call Christmas! =

Compilation album by Various artists
- Released: October 23, 2001
- Genre: Christmas music
- Length: CD 1: 48:59; CD 2: 67:33
- Label: UTV

Full series chronology
Now That's What I Call Music! 7 (2001)	Now That's What I Call Christmas! (2001)	Now That's What I Call Music! 8 (2001)

Christmas chronology
Now That's What I Call Christmas! (2001)	Now That's What I Call Christmas! 2 (2003)

This article describes a 2001 album in the U.S. Now! series. It should not be confused with other similarly titled "Now!" Christmas albums. For more information, see Now That's What I Call Music! and Now That's What I Call Music! discography

Professional ratings
Review scores
Source	Rating
AllMusic	4.5/5 stars
Entertainment Weekly	B−

Now That's What I Call Christmas! is a two-disc holiday music compilation that was released on October 23, 2001, by Universal Music Group. The album is part of the (U.S.) Now! series, and the first holiday-themed album in the series.

On November 15, 2004, Now That's What I Call Christmas! was certified 6× Platinum by the Recording Industry Association of America for shipment of six million units in the United States.

Based on sales figures provided by Nielsen SoundScan, the album was also the best-selling Christmas/holiday album in the U.S. for both 2001 and 2002 with sales of 1,614,000 and 741,000 copies respectively. As of November 2014, Now That's What I Call Christmas! is the eighth best-selling Christmas/holiday album in the U.S. during the SoundScan era of music sales tracking (March 1991 — present), having sold 3,480,000 copies.

== Track listing ==
=== Disc 1 ===
No.	Title	Artist	Length
1.	"The Christmas Song"	Nat King Cole	3:09
2.	"White Christmas"	Bing Crosby	2:57
3.	"Blue Christmas"	Elvis Presley	2:07
4.	"Have Yourself a Merry Little Christmas"	Frank Sinatra	3:27
5.	"Winter Wonderland"	Tony Bennett	2:13
6.	"Sleigh Ride"	Ella Fitzgerald	2:56
7.	"Let It Snow! Let It Snow! Let It Snow!"	Dean Martin	1:56
8.	"(There's No Place Like) Home for the Holidays"	Perry Como	2:51
9.	"The Most Wonderful Time of the Year"	Johnny Mathis	2:45
10.	"A Holly Jolly Christmas"	Burl Ives	2:13
11.	"Rudolph the Red-Nosed Reindeer"	Gene Autry	3:12
12.	"Grandma Got Run Over by a Reindeer"	Elmo & Patsy	3:27
13.	"Rockin' Around the Christmas Tree"	Brenda Lee	2:05
14.	"Jingle Bell Rock"	Bobby Helms	2:09
15.	"Little Saint Nick"	The Beach Boys	2:08
16.	"Merry Christmas Darling"	The Carpenters	3:05
17.	"Christmas Collage"	Kathy Mattea	3:33
18.	"Peace on Earth/Little Drummer Boy"	Bing Crosby & David Bowie	2:36

=== Disc 2 ===
No.	Title	Artist	Length
1.	"Happy Xmas (War Is Over)"	John & Yoko and The Plastic Ono Band with the Harlem Community Choir	3:32
2.	"Santa Claus Is Comin' to Town"	Bruce Springsteen	4:48
3.	"Do They Know It's Christmas?"	Band Aid	3:40
4.	"Wonderful Christmastime"	Paul McCartney	3:45
5.	"Our Love Is Like a Holiday"	Michael Bolton	3:16
6.	"(It Must Have Been Ol') Santa Claus"	Harry Connick Jr.	4:37
7.	"Jingle Bells"	Diana Krall	2:11
8.	"Away in a Manger"	Mannheim Steamroller	3:18
9.	"Deck the Halls"	Ottmar Liebert	3:06
10.	"Love on Layaway"	Gloria Estefan	4:26
11.	"Don't Save It All for Christmas Day"	Celine Dion	4:35
12.	"This Christmas"	Joe	3:05
13.	"Special Gift"	The Isley Brothers featuring Ronald Isley	3:57
14.	"All We Need Is Love (Christmas in the Yard)"	The Big Yard Family featuring Shaggy	3:58
15.	"My Only Wish (This Year)"	Britney Spears	4:15
16.	"You Don't Have to Be Alone (On Christmas)"	'N SYNC	4:32
17.	"O Come All Ye Faithful"	Luther Vandross	4:17
18.	"Silent Night"	Boyz II Men	2:31

== Charts ==
- 2001 Billboard 200 – No. 3
- 2001 Top Internet Albums – No. 4

== Certifications ==
Region	Certification	Certified units/sales
United States (RIAA)	6× Platinum	6,000,000^{^}
^{^} Shipments figures based on certification alone.

== See also ==
- List of Billboard Top Holiday Albums number ones of the 2000s
