= Now That's What I Call Christmas!: The Signature Collection =

Now That's What I Call Christmas! 2: The Signature Collection

Compilation album by Various artists
- Released: September 30, 2003
- Genre: Christmas music
- Length: CD 1: 77:38; CD 2: 57:51

Full series chronology
| Now That's What I Call Music! 13 (2003) | Now That's What I Call Christmas! 2: The Signature Collection (2003) | Now That's What I Call Music! 14 (2003) |

Christmas series chronology
| Now That's What I Call Christmas! (2001) | Now That's What I Call Christmas! 2 (2003) | Now That's What I Call Christmas! 3 (2006) |

Professional ratings
Review scores
| Source | Rating |
|---|---|
| Allmusic | 3.5/5 stars |

Now That's What I Call Christmas! 2: The Signature Collection also known as Now That's What I Call Christmas! 2 is an album released on September 30, 2003, as part of the Now That's What I Call Music series in the United States. It has sold over a million copies in the US.

== Track listing ==
=== Disc 1: Now and Forever ===
| No. | Title | Writer(s) | Artist | Length |
|---|---|---|---|---|
| 1. | "Opera of the Bells" | Mykola Leontovych | Destiny's Child | 4:37 |
| 2. | "O Come All Ye Faithful" | Traditional | Stacie Orrico | 4:00 |
| 3. | "I Don't Wanna Spend One More Christmas Without You" | Andrew Fromm; Jeffrey B Franzel; Sandy Linzer | *NSYNC | 4:04 |
| 4. | "Santa Baby" | Joan Javits; Philip Springer; Tony Springer | Kylie Minogue | 3:22 |
| 5. | "Santa Claus Is Coming to Town" | John Frederick Coots; Haven Gillespie | B2K | 3:09 |
| 6. | "Step into Christmas" | Elton John; Bernie Taupin | Elton John | 4:09 |
| 7. | "Jingle Bells" | James Pierpont | Jimmy Buffett | 3:53 |
| 8. | "All I Want for Christmas Is You" | Mariah Carey; Walter Afanasieff | Mariah Carey | 4:03 |
| 9. | "Do You Hear What I Hear?" | Noël Regney; Gloria Shayne | Vince Gill | 4:39 |
| 10. | "It Came Upon a Midnight Clear" | Edmund Sears; Richard Storrs Willis; Arthur Sullivan | Aaron Neville | 3:38 |
| 11. | "Last Christmas" | George Michael | Wham! | 6:44 |
| 12. | "Christmas Through Your Eyes" | Gloria Estefan; Diane Warren | Gloria Estefan | 5:01 |
| 13. | "Christmas Wrapping" | Chris Butler | The Waitresses | 5:24 |
| 14. | "A Christmas to Remember" | Amy Grant; Chris Eaton; Beverly Darnall | Amy Grant | 4:20 |
| 15. | "Silent Night" | Franz Gruber; Joseph Mohr | Charlotte Church | 3:46 |
| 16. | "Please Come Home for Christmas" | Charles Brown; Gene Redd | Luther Vandross | 3:38 |
| 17. | "O Holy Night" | Adolphe Adam; Placide Cappeau | Celine Dion | 5:22 |
| 18. | "Peace" | Horace Silver | Norah Jones | 3:49 |
| Total length: | | | | 77:38 |

=== Disc 2: Then and Always ===
| No. | Title | Writer(s) | Artist | Length |
|---|---|---|---|---|
| 1. | "Winter Wonderland" | Felix Bernard; Richard Bernhard Smith | Louis Armstrong, Gordon Jenkins And His Orchestra | 3:02 |
| 2. | "I'll Be Home for Christmas" | Kim Gannon; Walter Kent; Buck Ram | Barbra Streisand | 4:12 |
| 3. | "Silver Bells" | Ray Evans; Jay Livingston | Johnny Mathis | 3:32 |
| 4. | "The Little Drummer Boy" | Harry Simeone; Katherine Kennicott Davis; Henry Onorati | Lou Rawls | 2:59 |
| 5. | "Happy Holiday" | Irving Berlin | Peggy Lee | 1:55 |
| 6. | "The Christmas Blues" | David Holt; Sammy Cahn | Dean Martin | 2:55 |
| 7. | "Run Rudolph Run" | Johnny Marks; Marvin Brodie | Chuck Berry | 2:45 |
| 8. | "Baby, It's Cold Outside" (with Cerys Matthews from Catatonia) | Frank Loesser | Tom Jones | 3:41 |
| 9. | "Feliz Navidad (Live)" | José Feliciano | Jose Feliciano | 4:56 |
| 10. | "Rudolph the Red-Nosed Reindeer" | Johnny Marks | Burl Ives | 2:10 |
| 11. | "The First Noel" | Traditional | Andy Williams | 3:06 |
| 12. | "I Know What I Want for Christmas" | Charlie Black; Dana Hunt | George Strait | 3:23 |
| 13. | "O Little Town of Bethlehem" | Phillips Brooks; Lewis Redner | Yolanda Adams | 4:10 |
| 14. | "Kentucky Homemade Christmas" | Bill Caswell; Kin Vassy | Kenny Rogers | 4:14 |
| 15. | "Go Tell It on the Mountain" | Traditional | Andy Griffith | 2:21 |
| 16. | "Adeste Fideles (O Come, All Ye Faithful)" (with The National Philharmonic Orchestra & the London Voices as conducted by Karl Herbert Adler) | Frederick Oakeley; John Francis Wade | Luciano Pavarotti | 3:31 |
| 17. | "(There's No Place Like) Home for the Holidays" | Robert Allen; Al Stillman | Barry Manilow | 2:27 |
| 18. | "Auld Lang Syne" | Robert Burns | Guy Lombardo | 2:32 |
| Total length: | | | | 57:51 |

== Certifications ==
| Region | Certification | Certified units/sales |
|---|---|---|
| United States (RIAA) | 2× Platinum | 2,000,000^{^} |
^{^} Shipments figures based on certification alone.

== See also ==
- List of Billboard Top Holiday Albums number ones of the 2000s
