= Now That's What I Call Music! 3 (American series) =

Compilation album by various artists
- Released: December 7, 1999
- Length: 70:15
- Label: Universal

Series chronology
Now That's What I Call Music! 2 (1999)	Now That's What I Call Music! 3 (1999)	Now That's What I Call Music! 4 (2000)

Now That's What I Call Music! 3 is the third volume of the Now That's What I Call Music! series in the United States. It was released on December 7, 1999, debuting at number nine on the Billboard 200 albums chart. It has been certified 2× Platinum by the RIAA.

== Reception ==
Professional ratings
Review scores
Source	Rating
AllMusic	3/5 stars

"There isn't anything tying these singles together musically, except for the fact that they were hits," says Steve Huey of AllMusic, "but all in all, it makes for a pretty entertaining and diverse snapshot of pop music circa the turn of the millennium."

== Track listing ==
No.	Title	Artist	Length
1.	"All Star"	Smash Mouth	3:19
2.	"American Woman"	Lenny Kravitz	3:49
3.	"What's My Age Again?"	Blink-182	2:28
4.	"Bailamos" (from Wild Wild West)	Enrique Iglesias	3:30
5.	"Sometimes"	Britney Spears	3:54
6.	"All I Have to Give"	Backstreet Boys	4:33
7.	"Tell Me It's Real"	K-Ci & JoJo	3:40
8.	"The Rockafeller Skank"	Fatboy Slim	3:27
9.	"Nookie"	Limp Bizkit	4:26
10.	"Special"	Garbage	3:43
11.	"If I Could Turn Back the Hands of Time"	R. Kelly	4:56
12.	"Get Gone"	Ideal	4:29
13.	"Chanté's Got a Man"	Chanté Moore	4:23
14.	"Hey Leonardo (She Likes Me for Me)"	Blessid Union of Souls	3:24
15.	"Why I'm Here"	Oleander	3:58
16.	"Happily Ever After"	Case	4:36
17.	"The Hardest Thing"	98°	4:33
18.	"Out of My Head"	Fastball	2:32

== Charts ==
=== Weekly charts ===
Chart (1999)	Peak position
US Billboard 200	4

=== Year-end charts ===
Chart (1999)	Position
US Top Billboard 200 Albums	26

== Certifications ==
Region	Certification	Certified units/sales
United States (RIAA)	2× Platinum	2,000,000^{^}
^{^} Shipments figures based on certification alone.
