= Now That's What I Call Music! 2 (American series) =

Compilation album by various artists
- Released: July 27, 1999
- Length: 72:40
- Label: Virgin

Series chronology
Now That's What I Call Music! (1998)	Now That's What I Call Music! 2 (1999)	Now That's What I Call Music! 3 (1999)

Now That's What I Call Music! 2 is the second volume of the Now That's What I Call Music! series in the United States. It was released on July 27, 1999, debuting at number three on the Billboard 200 albums chart. It has been certified 2× Platinum by the RIAA. The compilation includes one song which reached number one on the Billboard Hot 100: "...Baby One More Time".

== Reception ==
Professional ratings
Review scores
Source	Rating
AllMusic	4/5 stars

Stephen Thomas Erlewine of AllMusic says the album is "a terrific time capsule, at the very least, capturing what American pop radio sounded like in the late '90s" and "an entertaining snapshot of a fleeting era in pop music history".

== Track listing ==
No.	Title	Artist	Length
1.	"...Baby One More Time"	Britney Spears	3:32
2.	"You Get What You Give"	New Radicals	5:01
3.	"Millennium"	Robbie Williams	4:06
4.	"Closing Time"	Semisonic	4:34
5.	"Sweetest Thing" (The Single Mix)	U2	3:02
6.	"My Favorite Mistake"	Sheryl Crow	4:07
7.	"Praise You" (Radio Edit)	Fatboy Slim	3:48
8.	"I Think I'm Paranoid"	Garbage	3:38
9.	"Never There"	Cake	2:44
10.	"Because of You"	98 Degrees	4:57
11.	"Goodbye" (Single Version)	Spice Girls	4:20
12.	"Take Me There"	Blackstreet & Mýa featuring Mase & Blinky Blink	4:04
13.	"When a Woman's Fed Up" (Clean Version)	R. Kelly	4:38
14.	"Father of Mine"	Everclear	3:52
15.	"What I Got" (Clean Version)	Sublime	2:48
16.	"I'll Never Break Your Heart"	Backstreet Boys	4:47
17.	"Hard Knock Life (Ghetto Anthem)" (Edit)	Jay-Z	3:36
18.	"Everybody's Free (To Wear Sunscreen)" (Edit)	Baz Luhrmann	5:05

== Charts ==
=== Weekly charts ===
Chart (1999)	Peak position
US Billboard 200	3
US Top Internet Album Sales (Billboard)	9

=== Year-end charts ===
Chart (1999)	Position
US Top Billboard 200 Albums	67

== Certifications ==
Region	Certification	Certified units/sales
United States (RIAA)	2× Platinum	2,000,000^{^}
^{^} Shipments figures based on certification alone.
