= Now That's What I Call Music! 14 (American series) =

Compilation album by various artists
- Released: November 4, 2003
- Genre: Pop, R&B, hip-hop
- Length: 73:52
- Label: Sony

Numbered series chronology
Now That's What I Call Music! 13 (2003)	Now That's What I Call Music! 14 (2003)	Now That's What I Call Music! 15 (2004)

Full series chronology
Now That's What I Call Christmas!: The Signature Collection (2003)	Now That's What I Call Music! 14 (2003)	Now That's What I Call Music! 15 (2004)

Professional ratings
Review scores
Source	Rating
Allmusic	3/5 stars

Now That's What I Call Music! 14 was released on November 4, 2003. The album is the 14th edition of the (US) Now! series. It peaked at number three on the Billboard 200 and number eleven on the R&B/Hip-Hop albums charts. It has been certified 3× Platinum. The album spent a record 13 weeks in the top 10 of the Billboard 200, the most for any multi-artist compilation album since 1963.

Now! 14 features the Billboard Hot 100 number-one hit, "Crazy in Love".

== Track listing ==
No.	Title	Artist	Length
1.	"Crazy in Love"	Beyoncé featuring Jay-Z	3:55
2.	"Where Is the Love?"	The Black Eyed Peas featuring Justin Timberlake	3:49
3.	"My Love Is Like...Wo"	Mýa	3:26
4.	"Never Leave You (Uh Oooh, Uh Oooh)"	Lumidee	3:02
5.	"Right Thurr"	Chingy	3:36
6.	"Wat Da Hook Gon Be"	Murphy Lee featuring Jermaine Dupri	3:44
7.	"Thoia Thoing"	R. Kelly	3:40
8.	"Let's Get Down"	Bow Wow featuring Baby	4:19
9.	"Señorita"	Justin Timberlake	4:34
10.	"I Want You"	Thalía featuring Fat Joe	3:29
11.	"Suga Suga"	Baby Bash featuring Frankie J.	3:58
12.	"In Those Jeans"	Ginuwine	4:02
13.	"Walked Outta Heaven"	Jagged Edge	3:48
14.	"(There's Gotta Be) More to Life"	Stacie Orrico	3:19
15.	"Why Can't I?"	Liz Phair	3:27
16.	"Stacy's Mom"	Fountains of Wayne	3:15
17.	"Girls & Boys"	Good Charlotte	3:01
18.	"The Boys of Summer"	The Ataris	4:01
19.	"Someday"	Nickelback	3:25
20.	"Here Without You"	3 Doors Down	3:54

Note: The Lumidee single "Never Leave You (Uh Oooh, Uh Oooh)" is not the remix featuring Fabolous & Busta Rhymes, but the original album version.

== Charts ==
=== Weekly charts ===
Chart (2003)	Peak position
US Billboard 200	3
US Top R&B/Hip-Hop Albums (Billboard)	11

=== Year-end charts ===
Chart (2004)	Position
US Billboard 200	13
US Top R&B/Hip-Hop Albums (Billboard)	63
Worldwide Albums (IFPI)	39
