= Now That's What I Call Music! 13 (American series) =

Compilation album by various artists
- Released: July 22, 2003
- Length: 77:10
- Label: UMG

Numbered series chronology
Now That's What I Call Music! 12 (2003)	Now That's What I Call Music! 13 (2003)	Now That's What I Call Christmas!: The Signature Collection (2003)

Professional ratings
Review scores
Source	Rating
AllMusic	2.5/5 stars

Now That's What I Call Music! 13 was released on July 22, 2003. The album is the 13th edition of the Now! series in the United States. It peaked at number two on the Billboard 200 and has been certified Platinum.

== Track listing ==
No.	Title	Artist	Length
1.	"Rock Your Body"	Justin Timberlake	4:26
2.	"I'm Glad"	Jennifer Lopez	3:41
3.	"Girlfriend"	B2K	3:23
4.	"Excuse Me Miss"	Jay-Z	3:49
5.	"Hell Yeah"	Ginuwine featuring Baby	3:38
6.	"Pump It Up"	Joe Budden	3:57
7.	"I Can"	Nas	4:08
8.	"Don't Wanna Try"	Frankie J	4:06
9.	"If You're Not the One"	Daniel Bedingfield	4:02
10.	"Big Yellow Taxi"	Counting Crows featuring Vanessa Carlton	3:43
11.	"Feel"	Robbie Williams	4:23
12.	"Stuck"	Stacie Orrico	3:42
13.	"Lights Out"	Lisa Marie Presley	3:37
14.	"Girl All the Bad Guys Want"	Bowling for Soup	3:16
15.	"In This Diary"	The Ataris	3:49
16.	"The Hell Song"	Sum 41	3:16
17.	"Send the Pain Below"	Chevelle	4:10
18.	"The Road I'm On"	3 Doors Down	3:58
19.	"Serenity"	Godsmack	3:45
20.	"Clocks"	Coldplay	4:10
