= Now That's What I Call Music! 6 (American series) =

Compilation album by various artists
- Released: April 3, 2001
- Length: 71:01
- Label: Epic

Series chronology
Now That's What I Call Music! 5 (2000)	Now That's What I Call Music! 6 (2001)	Now That's What I Call Music! 7 (2001)

Professional ratings
Review scores
Source	Rating
Allmusic	3/5 stars
Entertainment Weekly	C

Now That's What I Call Music! 6 was released on April 3, 2001. The album is the sixth edition of the Now! series in the United States. It debuted at number one on the Billboard 200, selling 525,000 units in its first week of release. It is the second number-one album in the series, following Now 4, and has been certified 3× Platinum by the RIAA. The album features three Billboard Hot 100 number-one hits: "Independent Women Part I", "It Wasn't Me", and "With Arms Wide Open".

== Track listing ==
No.	Title	Artist	Length
1.	"Stronger"	Britney Spears	3:22
2.	"Gotta Tell You"	Samantha Mumba	3:19
3.	"Bye Bye Bye"	NSYNC	3:19
4.	"Around the World (La La La La La)"	ATC	3:34
5.	"Love Don't Cost a Thing"	Jennifer Lopez	3:40
6.	"Independent Women Part I"	Destiny's Child	3:39
7.	"It Wasn't Me"	Shaggy	3:47
8.	"No More (Baby I'ma Do Right)"	3LW	3:24
9.	"Crazy"	K-Ci & JoJo	3:37
10.	"I Wish"	R. Kelly	4:09
11.	"Shape of My Heart"	Backstreet Boys	3:49
12.	"Crazy for This Girl"	Evan and Jaron	3:21
13.	"Yellow"	Coldplay	4:28
14.	"Again"	Lenny Kravitz	3:46
15.	"Hemorrhage (In My Hands)"	Fuel	3:56
16.	"With Arms Wide Open"	Creed	3:52
17.	"Drive"	Incubus	3:52
18.	"Beautiful Day"	U2	4:04
19.	"AM Radio"	Everclear	3:49

== Chart performance ==
Chart (2001)	Peak position
U.S. Billboard 200	1

== See also ==
- List of Billboard 200 number-one albums of 2001
