= Now That's What I Call Music! 5 (American series) =

Compilation album by various artists
- Released: November 14, 2000
- Length: 71:24
- Label: Sony

Series chronology
Now That's What I Call Music! 4 (2000)	Now That's What I Call Music! 5 (2000)	Now That's What I Call Music! 6 (2001)

Now That's What I Call Music! 5 is the fifth edition of the Now! series released in the United States. It was released on November 14, 2000, peaked at number two on the Billboard 200 and certified 4× Platinum by the RIAA, to date the only non-Christmas album in the U.S. series to achieve that status.

== Reception ==
Professional ratings
Review scores
Source	Rating
AllMusic	4/5 stars
Entertainment Weekly	D

AllMusic's Stephen Thomas Erlewine declares Now! 5 is "a Polaroid of the summer of 2000" and while pop music in general paled in comparison to the pop successes of the previous year, this volume "proves that it was a pretty good year after all." He calls "Aaron's Party (Come and Get It)" an embarrassing inclusion but maintains Now! 5 is "one of the better volumes in the American series."

Jim Farber for Entertainment Weekly has a different take, saying "Now That's What I Call Music! 5...compiles the crummiest singles crowding the airwaves" in 2000, making the pop music of the time "seem even drearier than it actually is."

== Track listing ==
No.	Title	Artist	Length
1.	"It's Gonna Be Me"	NSYNC	3:11
2.	"Give Me Just One Night (Una Noche)"	98 Degrees	3:24
3.	"Jumpin', Jumpin'"	Destiny's Child	3:47
4.	"Don't Think I'm Not"	Kandi	3:49
5.	"I Think I'm in Love with You"	Jessica Simpson	3:36
6.	"Faded"	soulDecision	3:24
7.	"Shake It Fast"	Mystikal	4:13
8.	"Case of the Ex"	Mýa	3:50
9.	"Aaron's Party (Come Get It)"	Aaron Carter	3:25
10.	"Lucky"	Britney Spears	3:24
11.	"Show Me the Meaning of Being Lonely"	Backstreet Boys	3:53
12.	"Incomplete"	Sisqó	3:51
13.	"I Wanna Be with You"	Mandy Moore	4:12
14.	"Doesn't Really Matter"	Janet Jackson	4:16
15.	"Back Here"	BBMak	3:37
16.	"Absolutely (Story of a Girl)"	Nine Days	3:11
17.	"Kryptonite"	3 Doors Down	3:53
18.	"Wonderful"	Everclear	4:32
19.	"It's My Life"	Bon Jovi	3:43

== Chart performance ==
Chart (2000)	Peak position
U.S. Billboard 200	2
