= Now That's What I Call Music! 12 (American series) =

Compilation album by various artists
- Released: March 25, 2003
- Length: 77:17
- Label: Capitol

Series chronology
Now That's What I Call Music! 11 (2002)	Now That's What I Call Music! 12 (2003)	Now That's What I Call Music! 13 (2003)

Professional ratings
Review scores
Source	Rating
AllMusic	2/5 stars

Now That's What I Call Music! 12 is the 12th edition of the Now! series in the United States, released on March 25, 2003. It debuted and peaked at number three on the Billboard 200 and has been certified Platinum. With an increased number of hip hop and R&B tracks on this volume, it reached No. 10 on Billboard's Top R&B/Hip-Hop Albums chart.

== Critical reception ==
AllMusic rated the album 2 out of 5 stars, stating "It's what you would expect and nothing more," noting the prominence of pop, R&B, and hip-hop on the album's track list.

== Track listing ==
No.	Title	Artist	Length
1.	"'03 Bonnie & Clyde"	Jay-Z featuring Beyoncé	3:23
2.	"Bump, Bump, Bump"	B2K & P. Diddy	3:52
3.	"Jenny from the Block"	Jennifer Lopez	2:48
4.	"Don't Mess with My Man"	Nivea featuring Brian and Brandon Casey of Jagged Edge	3:30
5.	"Luv U Better"	LL Cool J	3:26
6.	"Air Force Ones"	Nelly & St. Lunatics	4:30
7.	"Made You Look"	Nas	3:21
8.	"Beautiful"	Snoop Dogg with Pharell and Charlie Wilson	4:02
9.	"Blowin' Me Up (With Her Love)"	JC Chasez	4:19
10.	"Like I Love You"	Justin Timberlake	4:40
11.	"Breathe (Remix By 2 Square)"	Télépopmusik	3:27
12.	"I Should Be..."	Dru Hill	4:20
13.	"Stole"	Kelly Rowland	4:08
14.	"Miss You"	Aaliyah	3:56
15.	"Angel"	Amanda Perez	3:37
16.	"Pretty Baby"	Vanessa Carlton	4:06
17.	"Somebody Like You"	Keith Urban	3:42
18.	"The Red"	Chevelle	3:55
19.	"Always"	Saliva	3:50
20.	"When I'm Gone"	3 Doors Down	4:14

- Nivea's track “Don’t Mess with my Man” was the album version instead of the radio version which was labeled as “the Scorpio remix”.
- Amanda Perez's track “Angel” is the album version as opposed to the US radio Mix also known as “D-Lo Urban Remix”

== Charts ==
=== Weekly charts ===
Chart (2003)	Peak position
US Billboard 200	3
US Top R&B/Hip-Hop Albums (Billboard)	10

=== Year-end charts ===
Chart (2003)	Position
US Billboard 200	43
