= Now That's What I Call Music! 10 (American series) =

Compilation album by various artists
- Released: July 23, 2002
- Length: 73:04
- Label: Sony

Series chronology
Now That's What I Call Music! 9 (2002)	Now That's What I Call Music! 10 (2002)	Now That's What I Call Music! 11 (2002)

What's New! cover

Now That's What I Call Music! 10 is the tenth volume of the Now That's What I Call Music! series in the United States. It was released on July 23, 2002, and debuted at number two on the Billboard 200 albums chart. It has been certified Platinum by the RIAA.

== What's New! ==
The album was released in November 2002 with a limited edition promotional disc with 10 songs from mostly new and upcoming artists, titled What's New!

== Reception ==
Professional ratings
Review scores
Source	Rating
AllMusic	3/5 stars

Stephen Thomas Erlewine of AllMusic says: "Aside from having lesser-known hits such as 'First Date' and 'A New Day Has Come,' NOW 10 is recommended because it captures the particular sound and spirit of the time it covers." He adds, "The album captures that feeling of the music industry's slump in terms of sales and quality, and unlike radio in 2002, there are enough hits and good songs during this hour to make it worth listening to, overall."

Kimberly Reyes of Entertainment Weekly states that the album has a strange but diverse variety of songs, and Billboard even acknowledges that the album "goes a bit heavier on up-and-coming artists then past "NOW" sets."

== Track listing ==
Now 10 track listing
No.	Title	Artist	Length
1.	"Overprotected" (The Darkchild Remix)	Britney Spears	3:06
2.	"Can't Get You Out of My Head"	Kylie Minogue	3:49
3.	"Escape"	Enrique Iglesias	3:26
4.	"I've Got You"	Marc Anthony	3:55
5.	"Girlfriend" (The Neptunes Remix featuring Nelly)	NSYNC	4:44
6.	"I'm Gonna Be Alright" (Trackmasters Remix)	Jennifer Lopez featuring Nas	2:51
7.	"Don't Say Goodbye"	Paulina Rubio	3:38
8.	"Move It Like This"	Baha Men	3:22
9.	"More Than a Woman"	Aaliyah	3:48
10.	"Uh Huh"	B2K	3:05
11.	"Always on Time"	Ja Rule featuring Ashanti	3:28
12.	"Sugarhigh"	Jade Anderson	3:23
13.	"Halfcrazy"	Musiq	4:09
14.	"Underneath Your Clothes"	Shakira	3:39
15.	"A Thousand Miles"	Vanessa Carlton	3:54
16.	"A New Day Has Come"	Celine Dion	4:18
17.	"We Are All Made of Stars"	Moby	3:33
18.	"First Date"	blink-182	2:49
19.	"Stillness of Heart"	Lenny Kravitz	4:14
20.	"How You Remind Me"	Nickelback	3:42

What's New! track listing
No.	Title	Artist	Length
1.	"Get Over It"	OK Go	3:15
2.	"What Are You Waiting For?"	No Secrets	2:52
3.	"You Don't Know Me"	Jhené	3:54
4.	"Spending Time" (featuring Charli Baltimore)	Christina Milian	4:33
5.	"Why Don't We Fall in Love"	Amerie	2:39
6.	"Fun"	Rose Falcon	2:55
7.	"Now That I Know"	Shannon McNally	4:42
8.	"I Woke Up in a Car"	Something Corporate	4:13
9.	"100 Girls"	Stroke 9	3:13
10.	"Lonely Day"	Phantom Planet	3:41

== Charts ==
=== Weekly charts ===
Chart (2002)	Peak position
US Billboard 200	2

=== Year-end charts ===
Chart (2002)	Position
US Billboard 200	46

== Certifications ==
Region	Certification	Certified units/sales
United States (RIAA)	Platinum	1,000,000^{^}
^{^} Shipments figures based on certification alone.
