= Now That's What I Call Music! 7 (American series) =

Compilation album by various artists
- Released: July 31, 2001
- Length: 71:21
- Label: Virgin

Series chronology
Now That's What I Call Music! 6 (2001)	Now That's What I Call Music! 7 (2001)	Now That's What I Call Christmas! (2001)

Professional ratings
Review scores
Source	Rating
AllMusic	3/5 stars

Now That's What I Call Music! 7 was released on July 31, 2001. The album is the seventh edition of the (U.S.) Now! series. It debuted at number one on the Billboard 200 albums chart, selling 621,000 copies in its first week, the highest opening week of sales for any U.S. Now! album. It is the third number-one album in the series and has been certified 3× Platinum by the RIAA. Now! 7 is the first in the series to also crossover onto the Billboard Top R&B/Hip-Hop Albums chart, peaking at number three.

The album features one track, "All for You", that reached number one on the Billboard Hot 100.

== Track listing ==
No.	Title	Artist	Length
1.	"Survivor"	Destiny's Child	4:00
2.	"All for You"	Janet Jackson	4:22
3.	"Baby, Come Over (This Is Our Night)"	Samantha Mumba	3:31
4.	"In My Pocket"	Mandy Moore	3:38
5.	"Play"	Jennifer Lopez	3:30
6.	"The Call" (Neptunes Remix)	Backstreet Boys	3:53
7.	"Playas Gon' Play"	3LW	3:41
8.	"Ride wit Me"	Nelly featuring City Spud	4:13
9.	"Danger (Been So Long)"	Mystikal featuring Nivea	3:32
10.	"Fiesta Remix"	R. Kelly featuring Jay-Z and Boo & Gotti	4:25
11.	"Let Me Blow Ya Mind"	Eve featuring Gwen Stefani	3:43
12.	"What Would You Do?"	City High	2:50
13.	"Don't Let Me Be the Last to Know"	Britney Spears	3:50
14.	"This I Promise You"	NSYNC	4:43
15.	"Never Had a Dream Come True"	S Club 7	4:00
16.	"Hanging by a Moment"	Lifehouse	3:35
17.	"Jaded"	Aerosmith	3:34
18.	"From My Head to My Heart"	Evan and Jaron	3:10
19.	"Flavor of the Weak"	American Hi-Fi	3:08

== Charts ==
=== Weekly charts ===
Chart (2001)	Peak position
US Billboard 200	1
US Top R&B/Hip-Hop Albums (Billboard)	3

=== Year-end charts ===
Chart (2001)	Position
US Billboard 200	24
Chart (2002)	Position
US Billboard 200	114

== See also ==
- List of Billboard 200 number-one albums of 2001
