= Now That's What I Call Music! 20 (American series) =

Compilation album by various artists
- Released: November 1, 2005
- Length: 76:41
- Label: Universal Music Group

Series chronology
Now That's What I Call Music! 19 (2005)	Now That's What I Call Music! 20 (2005)	Now That's What I Call Music! #1's (2006)

Now That's What I Call Music! 20 is the 20th edition of the (U.S.) Now! series. It was released on November 1, 2005. It debuted at number-one on the Billboard 200 and is the eighth number-one album in the series. The album has been certified 2× Platinum.

== Track listing ==
No.	Title	Artist	Length
1.	"Lose Control"	Missy Elliott featuring Ciara and Fat Man Scoop	3:00
2.	"Don't Phunk with My Heart"	The Black Eyed Peas	4:01
3.	"Don't Cha"	The Pussycat Dolls featuring Busta Rhymes	3:36
4.	"Pon de Replay"	Rihanna	3:33
5.	"Pimpin' All Over the World"	Ludacris featuring Bobby Valentino	3:58
6.	"Like You"	Bow Wow featuring Ciara	3:25
7.	"I Think They Like Me" (Remix)	Dem Franchize Boyz featuring Jermaine Dupri, Da Brat and Bow Wow	4:42
8.	"Cater 2 U"	Destiny's Child	4:03
9.	"Must Be Nice"	Lyfe Jennings	3:43
10.	"These Words (I Love You, I Love You)"	Natasha Bedingfield	3:35
11.	"Behind These Hazel Eyes"	Kelly Clarkson	3:19
12.	"Listen to Your Heart"	D.H.T. featuring Edmée	4:28
13.	"Just Want You to Know"	Backstreet Boys	3:52
14.	"Just the Girl"	The Click Five	3:50
15.	"Do You Want To"	Franz Ferdinand	3:35
16.	"Beverly Hills"	Weezer	3:15
17.	"Sugar, We're Goin' Down"	Fall Out Boy	3:46
18.	"You and Me"	Lifehouse	3:11
19.	"Fix You"	Coldplay	4:53
20.	"You'll Think of Me"	Keith Urban	4:52

== Reception ==
Professional ratings
Review scores
Source	Rating
AllMusic	2.5/5 stars

Andy Kellman in his review for AllMusic recognizes that a lot of top artists contribute to Now! 20 but those artists "deliver songs that are either tepid retreads or safe compounds of past hits", but it's the songs by the newer artists of the time "that keeps the compilation from being disposable", pointing out tracks by the Pussycat Dolls, Fall Out Boy, and Rihanna as standouts from this volume.

== Charts ==
=== Weekly charts ===
Chart (2005)	Peak position
US Billboard 200	1

=== Year-end charts ===
Chart (2005)	Position
US Billboard 200	108
Chart (2006)	Position
US Billboard 200	13
