= Now That's What I Call Music! 4 (American series) =

Compilation album by various artists
- Released: July 18, 2000
- Length: 71:01
- Label: UMG

Series chronology
Now That's What I Call Music! 3 (1999)	Now That's What I Call Music! 4 (2000)	Now That's What I Call Music! 5 (2000)

Professional ratings
Review scores
Source	Rating
Allmusic	4/5 stars

Now That's What I Call Music! 4 was released on July 18, 2000. The album is the fourth edition of the Now! series released in the United States. It debuted at number one on the Billboard 200 albums chart. This was the first album in the American series to reach number one and marked "the first time ever that an album of previously released hits has debuted at number one in the U.S."

Two tracks on the album, "I Knew I Loved You" and "Try Again", were number-one songs on the Billboard Hot 100. In February 2001, it was certified 2× Platinum by the RIAA.

== Track listing ==
No.	Title	Artist	Length
1.	"Larger than Life"	Backstreet Boys	3:52
2.	"(You Drive Me) Crazy"	Britney Spears	3:18
3.	"I Need to Know"	Marc Anthony	3:47
4.	"Candy"	Mandy Moore	3:54
5.	"Blue (Da Ba Dee)"	Eiffel 65	3:26
6.	"It Feels So Good"	Sonique	3:58
7.	"I Belong to You"	Lenny Kravitz	4:15
8.	"I Knew I Loved You"	Savage Garden	4:10
9.	"I Wanna Know"	Joe	4:39
10.	"Try Again"	Aaliyah	4:44
11.	"Waiting for Tonight"	Jennifer Lopez	4:05
12.	"Get It On Tonite"	Montell Jordan	4:35
13.	"Steal My Kisses"	Ben Harper	4:05
14.	"Then The Morning Comes"	Smash Mouth	3:04
15.	"Meet Virginia"	Train	3:58
16.	"I Try"	Macy Gray	3:56
17.	"This Time Around"	Hanson	4:15
18.	"All the Small Things"	Blink-182	2:47

* The version of "(You Drive Me) Crazy" is not the popular The Stop Remix! played on U.S. radio stations, but the original ...Baby One More Time album version.

== Charts ==
=== Weekly charts ===
Chart (2000)	Peak position
US Billboard 200	1

=== Year-end charts ===
Chart (2000)	Position
US Billboard 200	33
Chart (2001)	Position
US Billboard 200	163

== See also ==
- List of number-one albums of 2000 (U.S.)
