= Now That's What I Call Music! 19 (American series) =

Compilation album by various artists
- Released: July 19, 2005
- Length: 75:41
- Label: Capitol

Series chronology
Now That's What I Call Music! 18 (2005)	Now That's What I Call Music! 19 (2005)	Now That's What I Call Music! 20 (2005)

Professional ratings
Review scores
Source	Rating
AllMusic	3/5 stars

Now That's What I Call Music! 19 was released on July 19, 2005. The album is the 19th edition of the Now! series in the United States. It debuted at number one on the Billboard 200, becoming the seventh volume of the series to reach the top of the pop album chart. It is also the only Now compilation to crossover and reach number one on the Billboard Top R&B/Hip-Hop Albums chart.

Now! 19 has been certified 2× Platinum and features one Billboard Hot 100 number-one hit, "Hollaback Girl".

== Track listing ==
No.	Title	Artist	Length
1.	"Hollaback Girl"	Gwen Stefani	3:18
2.	"Switch"	Will Smith	3:13
3.	"1 Thing"	Amerie	3:54
4.	"Oh"	Ciara featuring Ludacris	4:15
5.	"Slow Down"	Bobby V	3:52
6.	"Mockingbird"	Eminem	4:10
7.	"Girlfight"	Brooke Valentine featuring Big Boi and Lil Jon	3:34
8.	"Girl"	Destiny's Child	3:39
9.	"La Tortura"	Shakira	3:32
10.	"Baby I'm Back"	Baby Bash featuring Akon	3:40
11.	"How to Deal"	Frankie J	3:52
12.	"Ordinary People"	John Legend	4:00
13.	"Breathe (2 AM)"	Anna Nalick	4:07
14.	"Making Memories of Us"	Keith Urban	4:09
15.	"Incomplete"	Backstreet Boys	3:55
16.	"Let Me Go"	3 Doors Down	3:52
17.	"Be My Escape"	Relient K	3:10
18.	"Mr. Brightside"	The Killers	3:41
19.	"Speed of Sound"	Coldplay	4:21
20.	"Feel Good Inc."	Gorillaz featuring De La Soul	3:27

== Charts ==
=== Weekly charts ===
Chart (2005)	Peak position
US Billboard 200	1
US Top R&B/Hip-Hop Albums (Billboard)	1

=== Year-end charts ===
Chart (2005)	Position
US Billboard 200	24
US Top R&B/Hip-Hop Albums (Billboard)	54
Chart (2006)	Position
US Billboard 200	194
